= Great Britain at the 2000 Summer Paralympics =

- Flag of the United Kingdom
- IPC code: GBR
- NPC: British Paralympic Association
- Website: www.paralympics.org.uk

in Sydney
- Competitors: 215
- Medals Ranked 2nd: Gold 41 Silver 43 Bronze 47 Total 131

Summer Paralympics appearances (overview)
- 1960; 1964; 1968; 1972; 1976; 1980; 1984; 1988; 1992; 1996; 2000; 2004; 2008; 2012; 2016; 2020; 2024

Great Britain competed at the 2000 Summer Paralympics in Sydney. Britain finished second in the medal table, in both number of gold medals won and total medals, behind host nation Australia.

== Medallists ==
The following British competitors won medals at the Games. In the 'by discipline' sections below, medallists' names are in bold.

Medal	Name	Sport	Event	Date
Gold	Anita Chapman	Archery	Women's individual standing	
Gold	Deborah Brennan	Athletics	Women's 200m T34	
Gold	Kenny Churchill	Athletics	Men's javelin F37	
Gold	Tanni Grey-Thompson	Athletics	Women's 100m T53	
Gold	Tanni Grey-Thompson	Athletics	Women's 200m T53	
Gold	Tanni Grey-Thompson	Athletics	Women's 400m T53	
Gold	Tanni Grey-Thompson	Athletics	Women's 800m T53	
Gold	Caroline Innes	Athletics	Women's 200m T36	
Gold	Caroline Innes	Athletics	Women's 400m T36	
Gold	Christopher Martin	Athletics	Men's discus F33	
Gold	Robert Matthews	Athletics	Men's 10,000m T11	
Gold	Stephen Miller	Athletics	Men's club throw F51	
Gold	Sally Reddin	Athletics	Women's shot put F52-54	
Gold	Hazel Robson	Athletics	Women's 100m T36	
Gold	Noel Thatcher	Athletics	Men's 5,000m T12	
Gold	Lloyd Upsdell	Athletics	Men's 100m T35	
Gold	Lloyd Upsdell	Athletics	Men's 100m T35	
Gold	Nigel Muray	Boccia	Mixed Individual BC2	
Gold	Anne Dunham; Kay Gebbie; Lee Pearson; Nicola Tustain	Equestrian	Mixed Dressage Team open	
Gold	Kay Gebbie	Equestrian	Mixed Dressage – Freestyle grade IV	
Gold	Lee Pearson	Equestrian	Mixed Dressage – Championship grade I	
Gold	Lee Pearson	Equestrian	Mixed Dressage – Freestyle grade I	
Gold	Nicola Tustain	Equestrian	Mixed Dressage – Freestyle grade II	
Gold	Emma Brown	Powerlifting	Women's 82.5 kg	
Gold	Anthony Peddle	Powerlifting	Men's 48 kg	
Gold	Isabel Newstead	Shooting	Women's Air Pistol SH1	
Gold	Victoria Broadribb	Swimming	Women's 50 m Freestyle S2	
Gold	Kenneth Cairns	Swimming	Men's 100 m Freestyle S3	
Gold	James Crisp	Swimming	Men's 100 m Backstroke S9	
Gold	James Crisp	Swimming	Men's 200 m Medley SM9	
Gold	James Crisp; Jody Cundy; Giles Long; David Roberts; Matthew Walker; Marc Woods	Swimming	Men's 4 × 100 m Freestyle 34 pts	
Gold	Jody Cundy	Swimming	Men's 100 m Butterfly S10	
Gold	Melanie Easter	Swimming	Women's 400 m Freestyle S12	
Gold	Emily Jennings	Swimming	Women's 100 m Butterfly S9	
Gold	Sascha Kindred	Swimming	Men's 100 m Breaststroke SB7	
Gold	Sascha Kindred	Swimming	Men's 200 m Medley SM6	
Gold	Andrew Lindsay	Swimming	Men's 100 m Backstroke S7	
Gold	Giles Long	Swimming	Men's 100 m Butterfly S8	
Gold	Margaret McEleny	Swimming	Women's 50 m Breaststroke SB3	
Gold	David Roberts	Swimming	Men's 100 m Freestyle S7	
Gold	David Roberts	Swimming	Men's 50 m Freestyle S7	
Silver	Anita Chapman; Kathleen Smith; Jane White	Archery	Women's Teams open	
Silver	Kathleen Smith	Archery	Women's Individual W1/W2	
Silver	Mark Brown	Athletics	Men's Marathon T46	
Silver	Stephen Brunt	Athletics	Men's Marathon T12	
Silver	Michael Churm; Stephen Cooper; Stephen Herbert; Stephen Payton; Lloyd Upsdell	Athletics	Men's 4 × 100 m Relay T38	
Silver	Dan Greaves	Athletics	Men's Discus F44	
Silver	Tracey Hinton	Athletics	Women's 800 m T12	
Silver	Caroline Innes	Athletics	Women's 100 m T36	
Silver	Pauline Latto	Athletics	Women's Javelin F37	
Silver	Janice Lawton	Athletics	Women's Discus F33-34	
Silver	Christopher Martin	Athletics	Men's Javelin F33	
Silver	Robert Matthews	Athletics	Men's 5,000 m T11	
Silver	Robert Matthews	Athletics	Men's marathon T11	
Silver	Stephen Payton	Athletics	Men's 400 m T38	
Silver	Allan Stuart	Athletics	Men's 400 m T20	
Silver	Darren Westlake	Athletics	Men's 1,500 m T12	
Silver	Thomas Evans	Cycling	Mixed Bicycle Road Race CP Div 3	
Silver	Robert Allen; Andrew Slater	Cycling	Men's 1 km Time Trial Tandem open	
Silver	James Anderson	Swimming	Men's 100 m Freestyle S2	
Silver	James Anderson	Swimming	Men's 50 m Backstroke S2	
Silver	James Anderson	Swimming	Men's 50 m Freestyle S2	
Silver	Sarah Bailey	Swimming	Women's 100 m Backstroke S10	
Silver	Sarah Bailey; Lara Ferguson; Emily Jennings; Jeanette Chippington	Swimming	Women's 4 × 100 m Medley 34 pts	
Silver	Ritchie Barber	Swimming	Men's 50 m Butterfly S7	
Silver	Elaine Barrett	Swimming	Women's 200 m Medley SM11	
Silver	Kenneth Cairns	Swimming	Men's 50 m Freestyle S3	
Silver	Kenneth Cairns	Swimming	Men's 200 m Freestyle S3	
Silver	James Crisp	Swimming	Men's 100 m Butterfly S9	
Silver	James Crisp; Sascha Kindred; Giles Long; Paul Noble; Marc Woods	Swimming	Men's 4 × 100 m Medley 34 pts	
Silver	Francis Dart; Chris Hendy; Chris Pugh; Peter Snashall	Swimming	Men's 4 × 100 m Freestyle S14	
Silver	Melanie Easter	Swimming	Women's 100 m Freestyle S12	
Silver	Christopher Holmes; Darren Leach; Tim Reddish; Ian Sharpe	Swimming	Men's 4 × 100 m Medley S11-13	
Silver	Darren Leach	Swimming	Men's 50 m Freestyle S12	
Silver	Nyree Lewis	Swimming	Women's 100 m Backstroke S6	
Silver	Emma Mounkley	Swimming	Women's 50 m Butterfly S14	
Silver	Emma Mounkley	Swimming	Women's 50 m Freestyle S14	
Silver	Fiona Neale	Swimming	Women's 100 m Backstroke S8	
Silver	David Roberts	Swimming	Men's 100 m Backstroke S7	
Silver	David Roberts	Swimming	Men's 400 m Freestyle S7	
Silver	Ian Sharpe	Swimming	Men's 100 m Butterfly S12	
Silver	Matthew Walker	Swimming	Men's 50 m Freestyle S7	
Silver	Tracy Wiscombe	Swimming	Women's 200 m Freestyle S14	
Silver	James Rawson; Neil Robinson; Stefan Trofan	Table tennis	Men's Teams 3	
Bronze	Deborah Brennan	Athletics	Women's 100 m T34	
Bronze	Stephen Cooper	Athletics	Men's 800 m T38	
Bronze	Danny Crates	Athletics	Men's 400 m T46	
Bronze	Tracey Hinton	Athletics	Women's 200 m T11	
Bronze	Tracey Hinton	Athletics	Women's 400 m T11	
Bronze	David Holding	Athletics	Men's 100 m T54	
Bronze	Stephen Miller	Athletics	Men's discus F51	
Bronze	Stephen Payton	Athletics	Men's 100 m T38	
Bronze	Stephen Payton	Athletics	Men's 200 m T38	
Bronze	Heindrich Swanepol	Athletics	Men's Javelin F12	
Bronze	Noel Thatcher	Athletics	Men's 10,000 m T12	
Bronze	Jonathan Ward	Athletics	Men's Shot put F13	
Bronze	Daniel West	Athletics	Men's Discus T34	
Bronze	Richard White	Athletics	Men's 100 m T35	
Bronze	Richard White	Athletics	Men's 200 m T35	
Bronze	Paul Williams	Athletics	Men's Discus F35	
Bronze	Paul Williams	Athletics	Men's Shot put F35	
Bronze	Paul Williams	Athletics	Men's Javelin F35	
Bronze	Kay Gebbie	Equestrian	Mixed Dressage – Championship grade IV	
Bronze	Nicola Tustain	Equestrian	Mixed Dressage – Championship grade II	
Bronze	Simon Jackson	Judo	Men's Up To 81 kg	
Bronze	Nicholas Slater	Powerlifting	Men's Up To 100 kg	
Bronze	Deanna Coates	Shooting	Women's Air Rifle Standing SH1	
Bronze	Elaine Barrett	Swimming	Women's 100 m Breaststroke SB12	
Bronze	Kenneth Cairns; Paul Johnston; Sascha Kindred; David Roberts	Swimming	Men's 4x50 m Freestyle 20 pts	
Bronze	Jeanette Chippington	Swimming	Women's 100 m Freestyle S6	
Bronze	Jeanette Chippington; Nyree Lewis; Margaret McEleny; Jane Stidever	Swimming	Women's 4x50 m Medley 20 pts	
Bronze	Jeanette Chippington	Swimming	Women's 50 m Freestyle S6	
Bronze	James Crisp	Swimming	Men's 100 m Freestyle S9	
Bronze	James Crisp	Swimming	Men's 400 m Freestyle S9	
Bronze	Jody Cundy	Swimming	Men's 100 m Backstroke S10	
Bronze	Melanie Easter	Swimming	Women's 200 m Medley SM12	
Bronze	Lana Ferguson	Swimming	Women's 100 m Breaststroke SB9	
Bronze	Christopher Fox	Swimming	Men's 400 m Freestyle S13	
Bronze	Dervis Konuralp	Swimming	Men's 50 m Freestyle S13	
Bronze	Darren Leach	Swimming	Men's 100 m Breaststroke SB12	
Bronze	Darren Leach	Swimming	Men's 100 m Freestyle S12	
Bronze	Nyree Lewis	Swimming	Women's 100 m Breaststroke SB5	
Bronze	Margaret McEleny	Swimming	Women's 150 m Medley SM4	
Bronze	Emma Mounkley	Swimming	Women's 200 m Medley SM14	
Bronze	Wayne Ryding	Swimming	Men's 100 m Breaststroke SB6	
Bronze	Ian Sharpe	Swimming	Men's 50 m Freestyle S12	
Bronze	Kirsty Stoneham	Swimming	Women's 100 m Freestyle S12	
Bronze	Matthew Walker	Swimming	Men's 100 m Breaststroke SB7	
Bronze	Tracy Wiscombe	Swimming	Women's 50 m Freestyle S14	
Bronze	Tracy Wiscombe	Swimming	Women's 100 m Freestyle S14	
Bronze	Catherine Mitton	Table tennis	Women's Singles 1–2	

=== Medals by sport ===
Medals by Sport
**Sport**	Gold medal	Silver medal	Bronze medal	Total
Athletics	16	14	18	48
Swimming	15	24	23	62
Equestrian	5	0	2	7
Powerlifting	2	0	1	3
Archery	1	2	0	3
Shooting	1	0	1	2
Boccia	1	0	0	1
Cycling	0	2	0	3
Table tennis	0	1	1	2
Judo	0	0	1	1
**Total**	**41**	**43**	**47**	**131**

=== Medals by gender ===
**Medals by gender**^{(Comparison graphs)}
**Gender**	Gold medal	Silver medal	Bronze medal	**Total**	**Percentage**
Male	22	28	28	78	59.5%
Female	18	15	19	52	39.7%
Mixed	1	0	0	1	0.8%
**Total**	**41**	**43**	**47**	131	**100%**

=== Multiple medallists ===
The following competitors won multiple medals at the 2000 Paralympic Games.

Name	Medal	Sport	Events
Tanni Grey-Thompson	Gold; Gold; Gold; Gold	Athletics	Women's 100 m T53; Women's 200 m T53; Women's 400 m T53; Women's 800 m T53
David Roberts	Gold; Gold; Gold; Silver; Silver; Silver; Bronze	Swimming	Men's 50 m Freestyle S7; Men's 100 m Freestyle S7; Men's 4 × 100 m Freestyle Relay 34 pts Men's 400 m Freestyle S7; Men's 100 m Backstroke S7; Men's 4 × 100 m Medley Relay 34 pts Men's 4x50 m Freestyle Relay 20 pts
James Crisp	Gold; Gold; Gold; Silver; Silver; Bronze; Bronze	Swimming	Men's 100 m Backstroke S9; Men's 200 m Medley SM9; Men's 4 × 100 m Freestyle Relay 34 pts Men's 100 m Butterfly S9; Men's 4 × 100 m Medley Relay 34 pts Men's 100 m Freestyle S9; Men's 400 m Freestyle S9
Lee Pearson	Gold; Gold; Gold	Equestrian	Mixed Dressage Championship Grade I Mixed Dressage Freestyle Grade I Mixed Dressage Team Open
Sascha Kindred	Gold; Gold; Silver; Bronze	Swimming	Men's 100 m Breaststroke SB7; Men's 200 m Medley SM6; Men's 4 × 100 m Medley Relay 34 pts Men's 4x50 m Freestyle Relay 20 pts
Caroline Innes	Gold; Gold; Silver	Athletics	Women's 200 m T36; Women's 400 m T36; Women's 100 m T36
Giles Long	Gold; Gold; Silver	Swimming	Men's 100 m Butterfly S8; Men's 4 × 100 m Freestyle Relay 34 pts Men's 4 × 100 m Medley Relay 34 pts
Lloyd Upsdell	Gold; Gold; Silver	Athletics	Men's 100 m T35; Men's 200 m T35; Men's 4 × 100 m relay T38
Kay Gebbie	Gold; Gold; Bronze	Equestrian	Mixed Dressage Freestyle Grade IV; Mixed Dressage Team Open; Mixed Dressage Championship Grade IV
Jody Cundy	Gold; Gold; Bronze	Swimming	Men's 100 m Butterfly S10Men's; Men's 4 × 100 m Freestyle Relay 34 pts Men's 100 m Backstroke S10
Nicola Tustain	Gold; Gold; Bronze	Equestrian	Mixed Dressage Freestyle Grade II; Mixed Dressage Team Open; Mixed Dressage Championship Grade II
Kenneth Cairns	Gold; Silver; Silver; Bronze	Swimming	Men's 100 m Freestyle S3; Men's 50 m Freestyle S3; Men's 200 m Freestyle S3; Men's 4x50 m Freestyle Relay 20 pts
Robert Matthews	Gold; Silver; Silver	Athletics	Men's 10000 m T11; Men's 5000 m T11; Men's Marathon T11
Melanie Easter	Gold; Silver; Bronze	Swimming	Women's 400 m Freestyle S12; Women's 100 m Freestyle S12; Women's 200 m Medley SM12
Matthew Walker	Gold; Silver; Bronze	Swimming	Men's 4 × 100 m Freestyle Relay 34 pts Men's 50 m Freestyle S7; Men's 100 m Breaststroke SB7
Anita Chapman	Gold; Silver	Archery	Women's Individual Standing; Women's Team Open
Emily Jennings	Gold; Silver	Swimming	Women's 100 m Butterfly S9; Women's 4 × 100 m Medley Relay 34 pts
Christopher Martin	Gold; Silver	Athletics	Men's Discus Throw F33; Men's Javelin F33
Marc Woods	Gold; Silver	Swimming	Men's 4 × 100 m Freestyle Relay 34 pts Men's 4 × 100 m Medley Relay 34 pts
Margaret McEleny	Gold; Bronze; Bronze	Swimming	Women's 50 m Breaststroke SB3; Women's 150 m Medley SM4; Women's 4x50 m Medley Relay 20 pts
Deborah Brennan	Gold; Bronze	Athletics	Women's 200 m T34; Women's 100 m T34
Stephen Miller	Gold; Bronze	Athletics	Men's Club throw F51; Men's Discus Throw F51
Noel Thatcher	Gold; Bronze	Athletics	Men's 5000 m T12; Men's 10000 m T12
James Anderson	Silver; Silver; Silver	Swimming	Men's 50 m Freestyle S2; Men's 100 m Freestyle S2; Men's 50 m Backstroke S2
Darren Leach	Silver; Silver; Bronze; Bronze	Swimming	Men's 50 m Freestyle S12; Men's 4 × 100 m Medley Relay S11-13; Men's 100 m Freestyle S12; Men's 100 m Breaststroke SB12
Stephen Payton	Silver; Silver; Bronze; Bronze	Athletics	Men's 400 m T38; Men's 4 × 100 m relay T38; Men's 100 m T38; Men's 200 m T38
Emma Mounkley	Silver; Silver; Bronze	Swimming	Women's 50 m Freestyle S14; Women's 50 m Butterfly S14; Women's 200 m Medley SM14
Ian Sharpe	Silver; Silver; Bronze	Swimming	Men's 100 m Butterfly S12; Men's 4 × 100 m Medley Relay S11-13; Men's 50 m Freestyle S12
Sarah Bailey	Silver; Silver	Swimming	Women's 100 m Backstroke S10; Women's 4 × 100 m Medley Relay 34 pts
Jeanette Chippington	Silver; Bronze; Bronze; Bronze	Swimming	Women's 4 × 100 m Medley Relay 34 pts Women's 50 m Freestyle S6; Women's 100 m Freestyle S6; Women's 4x50 m Medley Relay 20 pts
Tracey Hinton	Silver; Bronze; Bronze	Athletics	Women's 800 m T11; Women's 200 m T11; Women's 400 m T11
Nyree Lewis	Silver; Bronze; Bronze	Swimming	Women's 100 m Backstroke S6; Women's 100 m Breaststroke SB5; Women's 4x50 m Medley Relay 20 pts
Tracy Wiscombe	Silver; Bronze; Bronze	Swimming	Women's 200 m Freestyle S14; Women's 50 m Freestyle S14; Women's 100 m Freestyle S14
Elaine Barrett	Silver; Bronze	Swimming	Women's 200 m Medley SM11; Women's 100 m Breaststroke SB12
Stephen Cooper	Silver; Bronze	Athletics	Men's 4 × 100 m relay T38; Men's 800 m T38
Lara Ferguson	Silver; Bronze	Swimming	Women's 4 × 100 m Medley Relay 34 pts Women's 100 m Breaststroke SB9
Paul Williams	Bronze; Bronze; Bronze	Athletics	Men's Discus Throw F35; Men's Javelin F35; Men's Shot put F35
Richard White	Bronze; Bronze	Athletics	Men's 100 m T35; Men's 200 m T35

== Events ==
=== Archery ===
==== Men ====
Athlete	Event	Ranking round		Round of 32	Round of 16	Quarterfinals	Semi-finals	Finals	
Athlete	Event	Score	Rank	Opposition Result	Opposition Result	Opposition Result	Opposition Result	Opposition Result	Rank
Robert Anderson	Men's Individual W2	574	17	did not advance					
James Buchanan	Men's Individual W2	590	14	Fisk (AUS); W 150–140	Gabelli (ITA); L 150–152	did not advance			
John Cavanagh	Men's Individual W1	596	6	N/A	Saramon (FRA); L 127–129	did not advance			
Sandy Gregory	Men's Individual W2	601	10	Murphy (CAN); W 134–134	Jung (KOR); L 150–162	did not advance			
James Buchanan; John Cavanagh; Sandy Gregory	Men's Team Open	1787	3	N/A	Finland (FIN); W 218–210	Japan (JPN); L 200–204	did not advance		

==== Women ====
Athlete	Event	Ranking round		Round of 16	Quarterfinals	Semi-finals	Finals	
Athlete	Event	Score	Rank	Opposition Result	Opposition Result	Opposition Result	Opposition Result	Rank
Anita Chapman	Women's Individual Standing	568	2	Hybois (FRA); W 130–118	Cordowiner (AUS); W 89–85	Skubak (UKR); W 100–90	Olejnik (POL); W 90–7	Gold medal
Kathleen Smith	Women's Individual W1/W2	530	6	Droste (GER); W 143–100	Truccolo (ITA); W 90–74	Ko (KOR); W 96–91	Droste (ITA); L 96–101	Silver medal
Jane White	Women's Individual Standing	525	6	Morgensen (DEN); W 133–109	Skubak (UKR); L 84–88	did not advance		
Anita Chapman; Kathleen Smith; Jane White	Women's Teams Open	1623	3	N/A	Germany (GER); W 204–166	Japan (JPN); W 213–194	Italy (ITA); L 198–199	Silver medal

Legend: WR – World record; W – Won; L – Lost; N/A – Round not applicable for the event;

=== Athletics ===
Key

- Note–Ranks given for track events are within the athlete's heat only
- Q = Qualified for the next round
- q = Qualified for the next round as a fastest loser
- WR = World record
- PR = Paralympic record
- EU = European record
- NR = National record
- N/A = Round not applicable for the event
- Bye = Athlete not required to compete in round
- DNS = Did not start
- DNF = Did not finish
- DQ = Disqualified

==== Men—Track ====
Athlete	Events	Heat		Semi-final		Final	
Athlete	Events	Time	Rank	Time	Rank	Time	Rank
Leslie Allison	200 m T34	N/A		31.67	3	31.62	6
Leslie Allison	400 m T34	N/A		DQ		did not advance	
Nigel Bourne	100 m T20	N/A		11.27	2	11.20	5
Mark Brown	Marathon T46	N/A				2:33:02	Silver medal
Stephen Brunt	Marathon T12	N/A				2:34:10	Silver medal
Michael Churm	100 m T37	N/A		13.02	4	did not advance	
Richard Collins	400 m T36	N/A		1:04.37	3	1:03.99	6
Richard Collins	800 m T36	N/A		2:28.66	3	2:28.17	7
Stephen Cooper	800 m T38	N/A		2:14.54	2	2.09.10	Bronze medal
Danny Crates	200 m T46	N/A		23.70	3	did not advance	
Danny Crates	400 m T46	N/A		51.06	1	50.39	Bronze medal
Andrew Curtis	100 m T11	11.82	2 q	11.90	3	did not advance	
Andrew Curtis	200 m T11	24.85	2	did not advance			
Andrew Curtis	400 m T11	N/A		55.00	3	did not advance	
Graham Dunn	100 m T46	N/A		11.83	5	did not advance	
Mark Farnell	Marathon T13	N/A				2:48:50	7
Stephen Herbert	100 m T37	N/A		12.79	3	12.73	6
Stephen Herbert	200 m T37	N/A		26.54	4	26.45	8
David Holding	100 m T54	N/A		14.36	1	14.61	Bronze medal
David Holding	200 m T54	N/A		26.01	2	25.92	4
Robert Matthews	5000 m T11	N/A				16:09.00	Silver medal
Robert Matthews	10000 m T11	N/A				35:23.07	Gold medal
Robert Matthews	Marathon T11	N/A				2:47:48	Silver medal
Stephen Payton	100 m T38	N/A		12.02	2	11.93	Bronze medal
Stephen Payton	200 m T38	N/A				23.75	Bronze medal
Stephen Payton	400 m T38	N/A				51.37	Silver medal
Allan Stuart	100 m T20	N/A		DNS		did not advance	
Allan Stuart	400 m T20	N/A		49.51	1	49.17	Silver medal
Noel Thatcher	5000 m T12	N/A				15:46.57	Gold medal
Noel Thatcher	10000 m T12	N/A				32:17.79	Bronze medal
Lloyd Upsdell	100 m T35	N/A				13.46	Gold medal
Lloyd Upsdell	200 m T35	N/A				27.17	Gold medal
Darren Westlake	1500 m T12	N/A		4:19.56	1	4:13.87	Silver medal
Richard White	100 m T35	N/A				14.06	Bronze medal
Richard White	200 m T35	N/A				29.08	Bronze medal
Michael Churm; Stephen Payton; Lloyd Upsdell; Stephen Cooper; Stephen Herbert	4 × 100 m relay T38	N/A		51.11	3	48.68	Silver medal

==== Men-field ====
Athlete	Events	Result	Rank
Nigel Bourne	Long Jump F20	6.78 m	4
Kenny Churchill	Javelin F37	43.84 m	Gold medal
Terrence Dean	High Jump F20	1.59 m	7
Dan Greaves	Discus Throw F44	46.04 m	Silver medal
Christopher Martin	Discus Throw F33	26.71 m	Gold medal
Christopher Martin	Javelin F33	18.53 m	Silver medal
Stephen Miller	Discus Throw F51	14.99	Bronze medal
Stephen Miller	Club throw F51	27.74 m	Gold medal
Lee Mitchell	Shot Put F20	10.52 m	7
James Richardson	Club throw F51	25.73 m	5
Mark Smale	Shot put F56	DQ	
Mark Smale	Shot put F58	DNS	
Paul Smith	Discus Throw F51	13.34 m	7
Heindrich Swanepol	Javelin F12	47.59 m	Bronze medal
Jonathan Ward	Discus Throw F13	44.55 m	4
Jonathan Ward	Shot put F13	13.38 m	Bronze medal
Dan West	Discus Throw F34	30.70 m	Bronze medal
Paul Williams	Discus Throw F35	32.99 m	Bronze medal
Paul Williams	Javelin F35	38.69 m	Bronze medal
Paul Williams	Shot put F35	10.72 m	Bronze medal

==== Men-combined ====
Athlete	Events	Result	Rank
Richard Schabel	Pentathlon P53	3808	6

==== Women—Track ====
Athlete	Events	Semi-final		Final	
Athlete	Events	Time	Rank	Time	Rank
Debbie Brennan	100 m T34	N/A		20.54	Bronze medal
Debbie Brennan	200 m T34	N/A		33.87	Gold medal
Debbie Brennan	400 m T34	N/A		DQ	
Esther Cruice	100 m T38	N/A		14.65	7
Esther Cruice	200 m T38	31.50	6	did not advance	
Esther Cruice	400 m T38	N/A		1:07.85	4
Tanni Grey-Thompson	100 m T53	N/A		17.29	Gold medal
Tanni Grey-Thompson	200 m T53	N/A		30.88	Gold medal
Tanni Grey-Thompson	400 m T53	N/A		58.74	Gold medal
Tanni Grey-Thompson	800 m T53	N/A		2:01.33	Gold medal
Tracey Hinton	200 m T11	27.17	2	27.31	Bronze medal
Tracey Hinton	400 m T11	1:01.47	2	1:01.66	Bronze medal
Tracey Hinton	800 m T11	2:23.87	2	2:23.04	Silver medal
Caroline Innes	100 m T36	N/A		15.96	Silver medal
Caroline Innes	200 m T36	N/A		32.90	Gold medal
Caroline Innes	400 m T36	N/A		1:16.65	Gold medal
Beverley Jones	100 m T38	N/A		14.65	4
Beverley Jones	200 m T38	30.24	3	30.87	8
Karen Lewis	100 m T52	N/A		23.67	4
Karen Lewis	400 m T52	1:23.89	2	1:24.27	4
Hazel Robson	100 m T36	N/A		15.73	Gold medal
Hazel Robson	200 m T36	N/A		DQ	
Hazel Robson	400 m T36	N/A		1:21.03	4

==== Women-field ====
Athlete	Events	Result	Points	Rank
Pauline Latto	Javelin F37	19.63 m	N/A	Silver medal
Janice Lawton	Shot Put F33-34	5.90 m	707	5
Janice Lawton	Discus Throw F33-34	18.46 m	1138	Silver medal
Ina Martin	Shot Put F57	6.31 m	N/A	6
Sally Reddin	Shot Put F52-54	6.28 m	1222	Gold medal

=== Boccia ===
Athlete	Event	Preliminary matches		1/8th Finals	Quarterfinals	Semi-finals	Final	
Athlete	Event	Opposition Result	Rank	Opposition Result	Opposition Result	Opposition Result	Opposition Result	Rank
Nigel Murray	Mixed individual BC2	Fraile (ESP); W 6–3 Aigner (AUT); W 4–3; Soto (ARG); W 10–0		J H Lee (KOR); W 5–3	Ray (USA); W 4–3	Flood (NZL); W 6–3	J W Lee (KOR); W 5–2	Gold medal
Peter Pearse	Mixed individual BC1	Beltran (ESP); W 4–3 Marques (POR); L 4–5; Thomson (USA); L 3–4; Richardson (AUS); W 3–1		did not advance				
Dean Thomas	Mixed individual BC2	Galan (ESP); L 1–3 Roche (NZL); L 3–6; Olsen (NOR); L 3–4; Murphy (IRL); W 7–1		did not advance				
Anne Woffinden	Mixed individual BC2	J H Lee (KOR); W 3–2 J W Lee (KOR); L 1–5; Hayes (IRL); W 3–1; Ray (USA); L 2–6		did not advance				
Nigel Murray, Peter Pearse, Dean Thomas, Anne Woffinden	Mixed team BC1-2	Ireland (IRL); W 7–3 Austria (AUT); L 7–9; United States (USA); W 14–2		N/A	New Zealand (NZL); L 3–10	did not advance		

=== Cycling ===
==== Road ====
Athlete	Event	Time	Rank
Nigel Capewell	Mixed Bicycle Road Race LC1	1:54:28	8
Ian Cooper	Mixed Bicycle Road Race LC2	1:48:00	11
Iain Dawson; Raymond Hughes	Men's Tandem Open	176:29	12
Thomas Evans	Mixed Bicycle Road Race CP Div 3	44:03	Silver medal
Thomas Evans	Mixed Bicycle Time Trial CP Div 3	8:26	4
David Stone	Mixed Bicycle Road Race CP Div 3	46:49	7
David Stone	Mixed Bicycle Time Trial CP Div 3	8:32	7

Key

- AT = actual time
- FT = factor time

==== Track ====
Athlete	Event	Qualifying		Classification		Quarter-finals		Semi-finals		Final	
Athlete	Event	Time	Rank	Position Opposition Time	Rank	Opposition Time	Rank	Time	Rank	Time	Rank
Robert Allen; Andrew Slater	Men's 1 km Time Trial Tandem Open	N/A								1:05.332	Silver medal
Robert Allen; Andrew Slater	Men's Sprint Tandem Open	11.279	6	5–6; Italy (ITA); 11.764-?	W	Australia (AUS) ?-11.545	L	did not advance			
Nigel Capewell	Mixed 1 km Time Trial LC1	N/A								1:12.624	4
Nigel Capewell	Mixed Individual Pursuit LC1	5:14.318	11	did not advance							
Ian Cooper	Mixed 1 km Time Trial LC2	N/A								1:20.298	10
Ian Cooper	Mixed 1 km Time Trial LC2	5:24.291	10	did not advance							
Iain Dawson; Raymond Hughes	Men's 1 km Time Trial Tandem Open	N/A								1:07.417	5
Iain Dawson; Raymond Hughes	Men's Individual Pursuit Tandem Open	4:38.626	9	did not advance							

Key

- OVL = Win by overtaking
- Q = Qualified for next round
- WR = World record

=== Equestrian ===
==== Individual ====
Athlete	Horse	Event	Total	
Athlete	Horse	Event	Score	Rank
Deborah Criddle		Mixed Dressage Championship Grade III	60.330	8
Deborah Criddle		Mixed Dressage Freestyle Grade III	68.330	4
Anne Dunham		Mixed Dressage Championship Grade II	67.140	5
Anne Dunham		Mixed Dressage Freestyle Grade II	70.730	5
Kay Gebbie		Mixed Dressage Championship Grade IV	66.550	Bronze medal
Kay Gebbie		Mixed Dressage Freestyle Grade IV	73.380	Gold medal
Joanna Jackson		Mixed Dressage Championship Grade IV	61.660	17
Joanna Jackson		Mixed Dressage Freestyle Grade IV	67.680	6
Lee Pearson		Mixed Dressage Championship Grade I	67.960	Gold medal
Lee Pearson		Mixed Dressage Freestyle Grade I	73.350	Gold medal
Dianne Tubbs		Mixed Dressage Championship Grade I	65.180	5
Dianne Tubbs		Mixed Dressage Freestyle Grade I	68.550	4
Nicola Tustain		Mixed Dressage Championship Grade II	68.730	Bronze medal
Nicola Tustain		Mixed Dressage Freestyle Grade II	77.450	Gold medal

==== Team ====
Athlete	Horse	Event	Individual score			Total	
Athlete	Horse	Event	TT	CT	Total	Score	Rank
Anne Dunham		Team			137.87	427.42	1st place, gold medalist(s)
Lee Pearson		Team			141.31	427.42	1st place, gold medalist(s)
Nicola Tustain		Team			146.18	427.42	1st place, gold medalist(s)
Kay Gebbie		Team			139.93	427.42	1st place, gold medalist(s)

=== Goalball ===
==== Men's tournament ====
Squad list	Group stage		Classification		Quarterfinals	Semi-finals	Finals	
Squad list	Opposition Result	Rank	Classification Opposition Result	Rank	Opposition Result	Opposition Result	Opposition Result	Rank
From: Ian Beverley; Barrie Lane; Harry Leese; Christopher Mullins; Anthony Reddish; Shaun Stevenson	Finland; L 1–2	6	11–12; United States; L 2–3	12	did not advance			
From: Ian Beverley; Barrie Lane; Harry Leese; Christopher Mullins; Anthony Reddish; Shaun Stevenson	Canada; L 2–4	6	11–12; United States; L 2–3	12	did not advance			
From: Ian Beverley; Barrie Lane; Harry Leese; Christopher Mullins; Anthony Reddish; Shaun Stevenson	Lithuania; L 1–6	6	11–12; United States; L 2–3	12	did not advance			
From: Ian Beverley; Barrie Lane; Harry Leese; Christopher Mullins; Anthony Reddish; Shaun Stevenson	Hungary; L 1–4	6	11–12; United States; L 2–3	12	did not advance			
From: Ian Beverley; Barrie Lane; Harry Leese; Christopher Mullins; Anthony Reddish; Shaun Stevenson	Spain; L 1–5	6	11–12; United States; L 2–3	12	did not advance			

==== Women's tournament ====
Squad list	Preliminaries		Semi-finals	Finals	
Squad list	Opposition Result	Rank	Opposition Result	Opposition Result	Rank
From: Natalie Ball; Katy Colman; Ann Fairweather; Rachel Hall; Louise Simpson; Ami Turnbull	Sweden; L 2–3	5	did not advance		
From: Natalie Ball; Katy Colman; Ann Fairweather; Rachel Hall; Louise Simpson; Ami Turnbull	Canada; D 1–1	5	did not advance		
From: Natalie Ball; Katy Colman; Ann Fairweather; Rachel Hall; Louise Simpson; Ami Turnbull	Finland; D 0–0	5	did not advance		
From: Natalie Ball; Katy Colman; Ann Fairweather; Rachel Hall; Louise Simpson; Ami Turnbull	Spain; D 1–1	5	did not advance		
From: Natalie Ball; Katy Colman; Ann Fairweather; Rachel Hall; Louise Simpson; Ami Turnbull	United States; W 2–1	5	did not advance		
From: Natalie Ball; Katy Colman; Ann Fairweather; Rachel Hall; Louise Simpson; Ami Turnbull	Netherlands; D 1–1	5	did not advance		
From: Natalie Ball; Katy Colman; Ann Fairweather; Rachel Hall; Louise Simpson; Ami Turnbull	Australia; W 1–0	5	did not advance		

=== Judo ===
Athlete	Event	1/8th Final	Quarterfinals	Semi-finals	Final	Repechage Quarterfinals	Repechage Semi-finals	Bronze Medal Matches	Rank
Athlete	Event	Opposition Result	Opposition Result	Opposition Result	Opposition Result	Opposition Result	Opposition Result	Opposition Result	Rank
Simon Jackson	Men's −81 kg	Vincze (HUN); W 1010–0000	Tian (CHN); W 0221–0000S	Cruz Alonso (CUB); L 0000–0010	did not advance	Bye		Dub (UKR); W 1000–0010	Bronze medal
Darren Kail	Men's −66 kg	Oliveira (BRA); L 0000–0201	did not advance			Lee (KOR); W 0200S–0001	Sydorenko (UKR); L 0000–0110	did not advance	
Terence Powell	Men's −100 kg	Lyvtskyy (UKR); L DNS	did not advance						
Ian Rose	Men's −90 kg	Clarke (AUS); W 1031–0000S	White (IRL); W 1010–0000S	Lewis (USA); L 0002S–0201	did not advance	Bye		Guillaume (FRA); L 0001S–0111S	5

- WDL Withdrawal
- S Shido
- Bye = Athlete not required to compete in round
- DNS = Did not start

=== Powerlifting ===
Athlete	Events	Result	Rank Men
Natalie Blake	Women's −48 kg	80.0 kg	5
Emma Brown	Women's −82.5 kg	132.5 kg	Gold medal
Sharon Heath	Women's −52 kg	75.0 kg	7
Anthony Peddle	Men's −48 kg	168 kg	Gold medal
Nicholas Slater	Men's −100 kg	232.5 kg	Bronze medal
Lisa Pudner	Women's −48 kg	82.5 kg	4
Lisa Tuckey	Women's −44 kg	72.5 kg	7
Russell Willey	Men's −67.5 kg	172.5 kg	7

=== Sailing ===
Athlete(s)	Event	Total points	Rank
Mike Browne	Mixed Single Person 2.4mr	45.0	7
Andrew Cassell; Brian Harding; Andrew Millband	Mixed Three Person Sonar	37.0	5

=== Shooting ===
Athlete	Event	Preliminary		Final	
Athlete	Event	Score	Rank	Score	Rank
Karen Butler	Women's Sport Rifle 3x20 SH1	547.0	10	did not advance	
Karen Butler	Mixed Free Rifle Prone SH1	575.0	23	did not advance	
Deanna Coates	Women's Air Rifle Standing SH1	387.0	3	487.7	Bronze medal
Deanna Coates	Mixed Air Rifle Prone SH1	596.0	12	did not advance	
Keith Hughes	Mixed Air Rifle Prone SH2	591.0	13	did not advance	
Keith Morriss	Mixed Air Rifle Prone SH1	591.0	40	did not advance	
Keith Morriss	Mixed Free Rifle Prone SH1	576.0	19	did not advance	
Isabel Newstead	Women's Air Pistol SH1	376.0	2	474.6	Gold medal
Claire Priest	Women's Air Rifle Standing SH1	370.0	16	did not advance	
Claire Priest	Mixed Air Rifle Prone SH1	587.0	47	did not advance	

=== Swimming ===
==== Men ====
Athlete	Events	Heats		Final	
Athlete	Events	Time	Rank	Time	Rank
James Anderson	50 m Freestyle S2	1:16.27	2	1:08.19	Silver medal
James Anderson	100 m Freestyle S2	2:36.76	2	2:25.73	Silver medal
James Anderson	50 m Backstroke S2	1:14.35	1	1:08.59	Silver medal
Ritchie Barber	50 m Backstroke S7	1:27.54	4	did not advance	
Ritchie Barber	50 m Butterfly S7	33.87	1	34.16	Silver medal
Ritchie Barber	200 m Medley SM7	3:02.03	2	2:58.86	5
Kenneth Cairns	50 m Freestyle S3	53.79	1	53.87	Silver medal
Kenneth Cairns	100 m Freestyle S3	1:55.58	1	1:54.14	Gold medal
Kenneth Cairns	200 m Freestyle S3	N/A		4:08.22	Silver medal
Matthew Crabb	100 m Freestyle S8	1:10.02	7	did not advance	
Matthew Crabb	400 m Freestyle S8	5:19.99	5	did not advance	
James Crisp	100 m Freestyle S9	1:01.40	2	1:00.58	Bronze medal
James Crisp	400 m Freestyle S9	4:44.83	1	4:31.45	Bronze medal
James Crisp	100 m Backstroke S9	1:07.81	1	1:05.15	Gold medal
James Crisp	100 m Butterfly S9	1:07.51	2	1:05.59	Silver medal
James Crisp	200 m Medley SM9	2:31.21	1	2:25.33	Gold medal
Jody Cundy	100 m Backstroke S10	1:07.54	3	1:05.73	Bronze medal
Jody Cundy	100 m Breaststroke SB9	1:20.52	5	did not advance	
Jody Cundy	100 m Butterfly S10	1:02.18	1	1:00.21	Gold medal
Francis Dart	50 m Freestyle S14	28.00	5	did not advance	
Francis Dart	100 m Freestyle S14	59.15	2	59.21	7
Francis Dart	200 m Freestyle S14	2:09.01	3	2:07.91	6
Francis Dart	50 m Butterfly S14	31.28	6	did not advance	
Murray Dingwall	100 m Freestyle S14	2:16.93	5	did not advance	
Murray Dingwall	100 m Breaststroke SB14	1:19.57	5	1:20.07	7
Murray Dingwall	50 m Butterfly S14	30.04	3	30.23	8
Murray Dingwall	200 m Medley SM14	2:39.20	5	did not advance	
Stephen Feltham	400 m Freestyle S8	5:07.08	3	5:04.15	7
Christopher Fox	50 m Freestyle S13	26.93	3	26.98	5
Christopher Fox	100 m Freestyle S13	58.33	3	57.18	4
Christopher Fox	400 m Freestyle S13	N/A		4:22.06	Bronze medal
Christopher Fox	100 m Butterfly S13	1:07.75	3	1:07.47	7
Christopher Fox	200 m Medley SM13	2:27.61	3	2:25.51	6
Chris Hendy	50 m Freestyle S14	28.36	6	did not advance	
Chris Hendy	100 m Breaststroke SB14	1:20.89	7	did not advance	
Chris Hendy	200 m Medley SM14	2:33.38	3	did not advance	
Christopher Holmes	50 m Freestyle S12	27.33	3	did not advance	
Christopher Holmes	100 m Freestyle S12	59.48	3	59.73	7
Christopher Holmes	100 m Backstroke S12	1:18.47	4	did not advance	
Christopher Holmes	200 m Medley SM12	2:31.66	1	2:27.47	4
Paul Johnston	50 m Freestyle S4	47.42	2	46.23	6
Paul Johnston	100 m Freestyle S4	1:44.41	4	did not advance	
Paul Johnston	50 m Backstroke S4	1:00.05	7	did not advance	
Paul Johnston	50 m Breaststroke SB3	1:02.21	3	1:01.60	7
Sascha Kindred	100 m Freestyle S6	1:16.10	3	did not advance	
Sascha Kindred	100 m Breaststroke SB7	1:28.59	1	1:25.13	Gold medal
Sascha Kindred	50 m Butterfly S6	37.63	4	DQ	
Sascha Kindred	200 m Medley SM6	3:03.19	1	2:57.42	Gold medal
Dervis Konuralp	50 m Freestyle S13	26.60	2	26.12	Bronze medal
Dervis Konuralp	100 m Freestyle S13	59.93	4	59.14	7
Dervis Konuralp	100 m Butterfly S13	1:05.20	3	1:04.46	5
Dervis Konuralp	200 m Medley SM13	2:29.71	5	2:27.40	7
Darren Leach	50 m Freestyle S12	26.54	1	26.30	Silver medal
Darren Leach	100 m Freestyle S12	58.42	1	57.81	Bronze medal
Darren Leach	100 m Breaststroke SB12	1:15.76	2	1:15.79	Bronze medal
Darren Leach	200 m Medley SM12	2:31.68	2	2:30.01	7
Andrew Lindsay	50 m Freestyle S7	31.95	4	did not advance	
Andrew Lindsay	100 m Freestyle S7	1:09.82	5	did not advance	
Andrew Lindsay	400 m Freestyle S7	N/A		5:27.54	7
Andrew Lindsay	100 m Backstroke S7	1:17.99	1	1:16.09	Gold medal
Giles Long	100 m Butterfly S8	1:10.19	1	1:08.24	Gold medal
Giles Long	200 m Medley SM8	2:49.78	3	2:41.96	4
Alan McGregor	50 m Freestyle S2	1:18.15	4	1:17.93	8
Alan McGregor	100 m Freestyle S2	2:40.16	2	2:42.76	6
Alan McGregor	50 m Backstroke S2	1:16.98	3	1:18.41	6
Paul Noble	100 m Freestyle S10	1:00.78	6	did not advance	
Paul Noble	100 m Breaststroke SB9	1:21.65	5	did not advance	
Chris Pugh	100 m Freestyle S14	59.89	3	59.99	8
Chris Pugh	200 m Freestyle S14	2:06.92	1	2:06.42	5
Chris Pugh	100 m Breaststroke S14	1:17.86	4	1:18.01	5
Chris Pugh	50 m Butterfly S14	30.60	4	did not advance	
Chris Pugh	200 m Medley SM14	2:27.70	2	2:24.76	4
Tim Reddish	50 m Freestyle S11	29.66	3	29.19	7
Tim Reddish	100 m Freestyle S11	1:03.28	3	1:02.45	4
Tim Reddish	200 m Medley SM11	2:41.11	2	2:38.72	5
David Roberts	50 m Freestyle S7	29.84	1	28.58	Gold medal
David Roberts	100 m Freestyle S7	1:03.40	1	1:03.36	Gold medal
David Roberts	400 m Freestyle S7	N/A		4:53.89	Silver medal
David Roberts	100 m Backstroke S7	1:19.09	1	1:17.87	Silver medal
Wayne Ryding	50 m Freestyle S8	30.28	4	did not advance	
Wayne Ryding	100 m Breaststroke SB6	1:36.39	2	1:35.23	Bronze medal
Ian Sharpe	50 m Freestyle S12	27.26	2	26.57	Bronze medal
Ian Sharpe	100 m Freestyle S12	59.98	4	did not advance	
Ian Sharpe	100 m Butterfly S12	1:03.44	2	1:02.05	Silver medal
Peter Snashall	50 m Freestyle S14	29.16	8	did not advance	
Peter Snashall	100 m Freestyle S14	1:03.85	7	did not advance	
Matthew Walker	50 m Freestyle S7	29.76	1	28.90	Silver medal
Matthew Walker	100 m Freestyle S7	1:06.38	1	1:06.11	4
Matthew Walker	100 m Breaststroke SB7	1:34.58	2	1:32.56	Bronze medal
Matthew Walker	50 m Butterfly S7	38.52	5	did not advance	
Marc Woods	50 m Freestyle S10	27.42	4	did not advance	
Marc Woods	100 m Freestyle S10	1:00.15	4	did not advance	
Kenneth Cairns, Paul Johnston, Sascha Kindred, David Roberts	4x50 m Freestyle Relay 20 pts	N/A		2:46.77	Bronze medal
From: David Roberts, Matthew Walker, Giles Long, James Crisp, Jody Cundy, Marc Woods	4 × 100 m Freestyle Relay 34 pts	4:14.11 not sure who, Long only in heats	1	4:06.85 not sure who, Long only in heats	Gold medal
Francis Dart, Chris Hendy, Chris Pugh, Peter Snashall	4 × 100 m Freestyle Relay S14	N/A		4:03.00	Silver medal
Kenneth Cairns, Paul Johnston, Ritchie Barber, Wayne Ryding	4x50 m Medley Relay 20 pts	3:12.32	3	3:15.45	7
Francis Dart, Murray Dingwall, Chris Hendy, Chris Pugh	4x50 m Medley Relay S14	N/A		2:06.01	5
From: Sascha Kindred, David Roberts, Giles Long, James Crisp, Paul Noble, Marc Woods	4 × 100 m Medley Relay 34 pts	4:46.15 not sure who	1	4:38.71 not sure who	Silver medal
Tim Reddish, Christopher Holmes, Darren Leach, Ian Sharpe	4 × 100 m Medley Relay S11-13	N/A		4:31.33	Silver medal

==== Women ====
Athlete	Events	Heats		Final	
Athlete	Events	Time	Rank	Time	Rank
Sarah Bailey	50 m Freestyle S10	31.71	4	30.40	4
Sarah Bailey	100 m Freestyle S10	1:06.76	4	1:06.29	5
Sarah Bailey	100 m Backstroke S10	1:18.04	2	1:15.05	Silver medal
Sarah Bailey	200 m Medley SM10	N/A		2:44.43	4
Elaine Barrett	100 m Freestyle S11	1:19.54	4	1:18.80	7
Elaine Barrett	400 m Freestyle S11	5:58.71	3	5:57.24	4
Elaine Barrett	100 m Breaststroke SB12	1:30.65	2	1:30.39	Bronze medal
Elaine Barrett	100 m Butterfly S12	1:22.43	3	1:20.50	6
Elaine Barrett	200 m Medley SM11	3:05.85	1	3:06.89	Silver medal
Victoria Broadribb	50 m Freestyle S2	1:18.61	1	1:15.46	Gold medal
Victoria Broadribb	50 m Backstroke S2	1:44.28	3	1:36.67	5
Jeanette Chippington	50 m Freestyle S6	39.32	4	37.44	Bronze medal
Jeanette Chippington	100 m Freestyle S6	1:25.59	3	1:22.23	Bronze medal
Jennifer Coughlin	50 m Freestyle S13	N/A		30.62	5
Jennifer Coughlin	100 m Freestyle S13	N/A		1:06.49	5
Jennifer Coughlin	200 m Medley SM13	2:50.04	3	2:48.21	5
Melanie Easter	50 m Freestyle S12	31.10	3	30.68	6
Melanie Easter	100 m Freestyle S12	1:05.77	1	1:04.84	Silver medal
Melanie Easter	400 m Freestyle S12	N/A		4:53.95	Gold medal
Melanie Easter	100 m Butterfly S12	1:16.86	3	1:14.22	4
Melanie Easter	200 m Medley SM12	N/A		2:44.10	Bronze medal
Lara Ferguson	100 m Freestyle S9	1:11.61	7	did not advance	
Lara Ferguson	100 m Breaststroke SB9	1:30.88	2	1:29.66	Bronze medal
Lara Ferguson	200 m Medley SM9	2:56.52	4	did not advance	
Rosalinda Hardiman	100 m Backstroke S7	1:42.73	5	did not advance	
Rosalinda Hardiman	100 m Breaststroke SB6	2:00.41	4	2:01.58	6
Jemma Houghton	50 m Freestyle S13	N/A		31.49	7
Jemma Houghton	100 m Freestyle S13	N/A		1:08.77	6
Jemma Houghton	200 m Medley SM13	2:55.18	4	2:55.41	7
Emily Jennings	50 m Freestyle S9	33.19	6	did not advance	
Emily Jennings	100 m Backstroke S9	1:24.60	4	did not advance	
Emily Jennings	100 m Breaststroke SB8	1:40.38	3	did not advance	
Emily Jennings	100 m Butterfly S9	1:19.98	3	1:15.49	Gold medal
Natalie Jones	50 m Freestyle S6	43.38	6	did not advance	
Natalie Jones	100 m Freestyle S6	1:36.75	7	did not advance	
Natalie Jones	100 m Breaststroke SB6	2:09.31	5	did not advance	
Nyree Lewis	100 m Backstroke S6	1:36.16	1	1:35.27	Silver medal
Nyree Lewis	100 m Breaststroke SB5	1:52.07	2	1:52.41	Bronze medal
Nyree Lewis	200 m Medley SM6	3:37.06	3	3:36.54	4
Margaret McEleny	50 m Breaststroke SB3	58.96	1	58.12	Gold medal
Margaret McEleny	150 m Medley SM4	3:07.46	2	3:06.00	Bronze medal
Emma Mounkley	50 m Freestyle S14	29.67	1	29.37	Silver medal
Emma Mounkley	100 m Freestyle S14	DNS		did not advance	
Emma Mounkley	50 m Backstroke S14	34.80	1	34.07	4
Emma Mounkley	50 m Breaststroke SB14	39.33	2	39.13	5
Emma Mounkley	50 m Butterfly S14	31.44	1	31.06	Silver medal
Emma Mounkley	200 m Medley SM14	2:40.89	2	2:38.53	Bronze medal
Fiona Neale	400 m Freestyle S8	5:44.33	2	5:44.50	5
Fiona Neale	100 m Backstroke S8	1:22.66	1	1:20.25	Silver medal
Caroline Read	100 m Breaststroke SB7	N/A		1:58.48	4
Caroline Read	50 m Butterfly S7	49.55	5	did not advance	
Caroline Read	200 m Medley SM7	3:49.53	5	did not advance	
Jane Stidever	50 m Freestyle S5	49.12	4	48.23	8
Jane Stidever	200 m Freestyle S5	3:46.30	4	3:36.39	6
Jane Stidever	50 m Backstroke S5	1:00.14	3	59.55	6
Kirsty Stoneham	50 m Freestyle S12	30.64	1	30.48	5
Kirsty Stoneham	100 m Freestyle S12	1:06.68	2	1:05.98	Bronze medal
Kirsty Stoneham	400 m Freestyle S12	N/A		5:07.25	4
Kirsty Stoneham	100 m Breaststroke SB12	1:32.17	2	1:34.84	6
Danielle Watts	50 m Freestyle S2	1:45.14	4	1:41.56	6
Danielle Watts	100 m Freestyle S2	N/A		3:27.47	4
Danielle Watts	50 m Backstroke S2	1:46.53	4	1:40.61	6
Tracy Wiscombe	50 m Freestyle S14	30.57	1	29.55	Bronze medal
Tracy Wiscombe	100 m Freestyle S14	1:05.33	1	1:05.10	Bronze medal
Tracy Wiscombe	200 m Freestyle S14	2:22.08	1	2:15.97	Silver medal
Tracy Wiscombe	50 m Butterfly S14	33.57	3	32.82	4
Tracy Wiscombe	200 m Medley SM14	2:43.23	2	2:41.45	5
Victoria Broadribb, Jeanette Chippington, Nyree Lewis, Natalie Jones	4x50 m Freestyle Relay 20 pts	N/A		3:28.23	6
Jeanette Chippington, Emily Jennings, Sarah Bailey, Lara Ferguson	4 × 100 m Freestyle Relay 34 pts	N/A		4:52.04	4
Margaret McEleny, Jane Stidever, Jeanette Chippington, Nyree Lewis	4x50 m Medley Relay 20 pts	N/A		3:28.94	Bronze medal
Jeanette Chippington, Emily Jennings, Sarah Bailey, Lara Ferguson	4 × 100 m Medley Relay 34 pts	N/A		5:27.94	Silver medal

Legend: Q – Qualifiers for the next round DQ – Disqualified; WR – World record; PR – Paralympic record;

=== Table tennis ===
==== Men ====
Athlete	Event	Preliminary matches		Round of 16	Quarterfinals	Semi-finals	Final Bronze final	
Athlete	Event	Opposition Result	Rank	Opposition Result	Opposition Result	Opposition Result	Opposition Result	Rank
Arnie Chan	Singles 4	Caci (ITA); W 2–0 Park (KOR); L 0–2		Kober (GER); L 0–2	did not advance			
Barry Crook	Singles 9	Hsu (TPE); L 0–2 Adisa (NGR); L 0–2		did not advance				
Martin Evans	Singles 5	Bollden (SWE); L 1–2 Nilsen (RSA); L 0–2		did not advance				
Farrel Anthony	Singles 8	Andree (SWE); L 0–2 Jokinen (FIN); L 0–2		did not advance				
David Hope	Singles 7	Wollmert (GER); L 1–2 Glikman (ISR); L 0–2; Bass (USA); W 2–0		did not advance				
James Munkley	Singles 2	Boury (FRA); L 0–2 Lugan (MEX); L 1–2		did not advance				
Mark Palmer	Singles 4	Kober (GER); L 0–2 Pinna (FRA); L 0–2; Maeck (BEL); L 1–2		did not advance				
James Rawson	Singles 3	Yang (KOR); W 2–1 Panucci (ITA); W 2–1; Kylevik (SWE); L 1–2		Johansson (SWE); W 2–0	Kesler (YUG); L 0–2	did not advance		
Scott Robertson	Singles 5	Durand (FRA); L 1–2 Oka (JPN); L 1–2		did not advance				
Neil Robinson	Singles 3	Nielsen (DEN); L 1–2 Verger (FRA); W 2–0		Rodriguez (ESP); W 2–1	Oluade (NGR); L 0–2	did not advance		
Stefan Trofan	Singles 3	Dollmann (AUT); L 0–2 Son (KOR); L 0–2		did not advance				
James Rawson; Neil Robinson; Stefan Trofan	Teams 3	Italy (ITA); W 3–0 Sweden (SWE); W 3–1		N/A	Bye	South Korea (KOR); W 3–0	France (FRA); L 0–3	Silver medal
Arnie Chan; Mark Palmer	Teams 4	Czech Republic (CZE); W 3–2 South Korea (KOR); L 0–3; Belgium (BEL); L 1–3		N/A		did not advance		
Martin Evans; Scott Robertson	Teams 5	Sweden (SWE); L 0–3 Italy (ITA); L 1–3		N/A	did not advance			
Farrel Anthony; David Hope	Teams 8	Germany (GER); L 0–3 Sweden (SWE); L 0–3; Croatia (CRO); L 0–3		N/A		did not advance		

==== Women ====
Athlete	Event	Preliminary matches		Quarterfinals	Semi-finals	Final Bronze final	
Athlete	Event	Opposition Result	Rank	Opposition Result	Opposition Result	Opposition Result	Rank
Sue Gilroy	Singles 4	Sikora (GER); L 1–2 Rast (SUI); L 1–2		did not advance			
Catherine Mitton	Singles 1–2	Di Lorenzo (USA); W 2–0 Podda (ITA); W 2–1		N/A	Al-Bargouti (JOR); L 1–2	Podda (ITA); W 2–0	Bronze medal
Lynne Riding	Singles 1–2	Lafaye Marziou (FRA); L 0–2 Al-Bargouti (JOR); L 1–2		N/A	did not advance		
Catherine Mitton; Lynne Riding	Teams 1–3	N/A				Germany (GER); L 1–3 France (FRA); L 0–3; Netherlands (NED); L 1–3	4

=== Wheelchair basketball ===
==== Men ====
Squad list	Group stage		Quarterfinal	Semi-final	Final (Bronze final)	
Squad list	Opposition Result	Rank	Opposition Result	Opposition Result	Opposition Result	Rank
From: Ade Adepitan; Andy Blake; David Bramley; Terry Bywater; Steven Caine; Kevin Hayes; Fred Howley; Daniel Johnson; Simon Munn; Jon Pollock; Colin Price; Sinclair Thomas	Canada; L 50–55		France; W 67–56	Canada; L 51–66	United States; L 54–74	4
From: Ade Adepitan; Andy Blake; David Bramley; Terry Bywater; Steven Caine; Kevin Hayes; Fred Howley; Daniel Johnson; Simon Munn; Jon Pollock; Colin Price; Sinclair Thomas	United States; L 65–74		France; W 67–56	Canada; L 51–66	United States; L 54–74	4
From: Ade Adepitan; Andy Blake; David Bramley; Terry Bywater; Steven Caine; Kevin Hayes; Fred Howley; Daniel Johnson; Simon Munn; Jon Pollock; Colin Price; Sinclair Thomas	Germany; W 61–43		France; W 67–56	Canada; L 51–66	United States; L 54–74	4
From: Ade Adepitan; Andy Blake; David Bramley; Terry Bywater; Steven Caine; Kevin Hayes; Fred Howley; Daniel Johnson; Simon Munn; Jon Pollock; Colin Price; Sinclair Thomas	Mexico; W 70–58		France; W 67–56	Canada; L 51–66	United States; L 54–74	4
From: Ade Adepitan; Andy Blake; David Bramley; Terry Bywater; Steven Caine; Kevin Hayes; Fred Howley; Daniel Johnson; Simon Munn; Jon Pollock; Colin Price; Sinclair Thomas	South Africa; W 83–32		France; W 67–56	Canada; L 51–66	United States; L 54–74	4

==== Women ====
Squad list	Group stage		Semi-final (5–8 Classification semi-final)	Final (7–8 Classification final)	
Squad list	Opposition Result	Rank	Opposition Result	Opposition Result	Rank
From: Ann Wild; Sarah Baillie; Sarah Burrett; Jill Fox; Anna Jackson; Georgina Largen; Caroline Maclean; Bernadette O'Driscoll; Jenny Ridley; Kristina Small; Clare Strange; Nicole Vandersteen	Australia; L 12–43		Mexico; L 37–41	Germany; L 32–43	8
From: Ann Wild; Sarah Baillie; Sarah Burrett; Jill Fox; Anna Jackson; Georgina Largen; Caroline Maclean; Bernadette O'Driscoll; Jenny Ridley; Kristina Small; Clare Strange; Nicole Vandersteen	Netherlands; L 21–34		Mexico; L 37–41	Germany; L 32–43	8
From: Ann Wild; Sarah Baillie; Sarah Burrett; Jill Fox; Anna Jackson; Georgina Largen; Caroline Maclean; Bernadette O'Driscoll; Jenny Ridley; Kristina Small; Clare Strange; Nicole Vandersteen	United States; L 30–58		Mexico; L 37–41	Germany; L 32–43	8

=== Wheelchair fencing ===
==== Men ====
Athlete	Event	Pool matches		Round of 16	Quarterfinals	Semi-finals	Final	
Athlete	Event	Opposition Result	Rank	Opposition Result	Opposition Result	Opposition Result	Opposition Result	Rank
Jack Bradley	Men's Épée Individual A	Lachaud (FRA); L 2–5 Royal (USA); W 5–4; Lerre (ITA); W 5–3; Stanczuk (POL); L 1–5		Lipinski (GER); L 8–15	did not advance			
Jack Bradley	Men's Sabre Individual A	More (FRA); W 5–2 Walisiewicz (POL); L 1–5; Alston (AUS); L 2–5; Chan (HKG); W 5–2		Lipinski (GER); L 8–15	did not advance			
David Heaton	Men's Épée Individual B	Besseiche (FRA); L 1–5 Rogers (USA); L 2–5; Chung (HKG); L 2–5; Park (KOR); L 2–5; Hisakawa (JPN); L 3–5		did not advance				
David Heaton	Men's Sabre Individual B	Besseiche (FRA); W 5–1 Czop (POL); L 2–5; Lovejoy (USA); W 5–4; Lukacs (HUN); W 5–0; Allaho (KUW); W 5–3		Besseiche (FRA); L 10–15	did not advance			
Keith Mitton	Men's Épée Individual A	Al Qallaf (KUW); DNS Ezra (ISR); W 5–3; Jablonski (POL); W 5–4; Schwarz (GER); L 1–5		Kwong (HKG); L 8–15	did not advance			
Keith Mitton	Men's Foil Individual A	Pacault (FRA); L 0–5 Al Qallaf (KUW); DNS; Bolyos (HUN); L 3–5; Serafini (ITA); L 3–5; Ezra (ISR); W 5–1		Walisiewicz (POL); L 6–15	did not advance			
Michael Parsons	Men's Foil Individual A	Kempf (GER); W 5–2 Chan (HKG); L 2–5; Alston (AUS); W 5–1; Walisiewicz (POL); L 1–5; Royal (USA); W 5–1		Bolyos (HUN); L 3–15	did not advance			
Michael Parsons	Men's Sabre Individual A	Pacault (FRA); L 4–5 Tai (HKG); L 2–5; Serafini (ITA); L 2–5; Amansouril (KUW); W 5–2		Walisiewicz (POL); L 3–15	did not advance			
Peter Vicarey	Men's Foil Individual B	Szekeres (HUN); L 3–5 Mayer (GER); L 3–5; Komar (UKR); W 5–0; Chung (HKG); L 0–5; Czop (POL); L 1–5; Alsaedi (KUW); L 2–5		did not advance				
Peter Vicarey	Men's Sabre Individual B	Mari (ITA); L 4–5 Bartmann (GER); L 2–5; Szekeres (HUN); L 3–5; Hui (HKG); L 2–5; Park (KOR); L 3–5		did not advance				
Jack Bradley; David Heaton; Keith Mitton	Épée Team	N/A		Kuwait (KUW); L 24–45	did not advance			
Keith Mitton; Michael Parsons; Peter Vicarey	Foil Team	N/A		Kuwait (KUW); L 21–45	did not advance			
Jack Bradley; David Heaton; Michael Parsons; Peter Vicarey	Sabre Team	N/A		Bye	France (FRA); L 23–45	Classification 5–8; Italy (ITA); L 34–45	Classification 7–8; France (FRA); W 45–39	7

=== Wheelchair rugby ===
Squad list	Group stage		Semi-finals	Finals	
Squad list	Opposition Result	Rank	Opposition Result	Opposition Result	Rank
From: Alan Ash; Simon Chambers; Troye Collins; Keith Jones; Graham Kamaly-Asl; Bob O'Shea; Ian Prescott; Darren Ransome; Paul Shaw; Mike Spence; Tony Stackhouse; Rob Tarr	New Zealand; L 37–46	3	Semi-final 5–8; Switzerland; W 38–34	Classification 5–6; Sweden; L 40–39	6
From: Alan Ash; Simon Chambers; Troye Collins; Keith Jones; Graham Kamaly-Asl; Bob O'Shea; Ian Prescott; Darren Ransome; Paul Shaw; Mike Spence; Tony Stackhouse; Rob Tarr	Canada; L 33–38	3	Semi-final 5–8; Switzerland; W 38–34	Classification 5–6; Sweden; L 40–39	6
From: Alan Ash; Simon Chambers; Troye Collins; Keith Jones; Graham Kamaly-Asl; Bob O'Shea; Ian Prescott; Darren Ransome; Paul Shaw; Mike Spence; Tony Stackhouse; Rob Tarr	Germany; W 41–38	3	Semi-final 5–8; Switzerland; W 38–34	Classification 5–6; Sweden; L 40–39	6

=== Wheelchair tennis ===
Athlete	Event	Round of 64	Round of 32	Round of 16	Quarterfinals	Semi-finals	Finals	
Athlete	Event	Opposition Result	Opposition Result	Opposition Result	Opposition Result	Opposition Result	Opposition Result	Rank
Kimberly Dell	Women's Singles	N/A	Bye	Hwang (KOR); W 2–6 6–3 7–5	Peters (NED); W 6–3 6–3	Walraven (NED); L 2–6 7–5 2–6	Bronze Medal Match; Smit (NED); L 0–6 3–6	4
Bob Dockerill	Men's Singles	Diaz (ARG); L 3–6 3–6	did not advance					
Simon Hatt	Men's Singles	McKeage (CAN); L 5–7 4–6	did not advance					
Janet McMorran	Women's Singles	N/A	Bye	Chinprahus (THA); W 6–2 6–2	Smit (NED); L 6–2 1–6 0–6	did not advance		
Jayant Mistry	Men's Singles	Bye	Britnell (NZL); W 6–2 6–0	Saida (JPN); L 6–2 1–6 4–6	did not advance			
Simon Hatt; Jayant Mistry	Men's Doubles	N/A	Bye	Muangprom, Yodyangdang (THA); W 6–1 6–2	Bonnet, Giammartini (FRA); W 6–3 7–5	Ammerlaan, Molier (NED); L 3–6 7–5 1–6	Bronze Medal Match; Douglas, Welch (USA); L 2–6 7–6 3–6	4
Kimberly Dell; Janet McMorran	Women's Doubles	N/A		Bye	Kawashima, Ohmae (JPN); W 6–2 7–6	Smit, Vergeer (NED); L 0–6 3–6	Bronze Medal Match; Otterbach, Sax-Scharl (GER); L 7–5 4–6 4–6	4

== See also ==
- Great Britain at the 2000 Summer Olympics
