= Great Britain at the 1996 Summer Paralympics =

- Flag of the United Kingdom
- IPC code: GBR
- NPC: British Paralympic Association
- Website: www.paralympics.org.uk

in Atlanta
- Competitors: 248
- Medals Ranked 4th: Gold 39 Silver 42 Bronze 41 Total 122

Summer Paralympics appearances (overview)
- 1960; 1964; 1968; 1972; 1976; 1980; 1984; 1988; 1992; 1996; 2000; 2004; 2008; 2012; 2016; 2020; 2024

Great Britain competed at the 1996 Summer Paralympics in Atlanta, United States.

== Medallists ==
=== Paralympic sports ===
Medal	Name	Sport	Event
Gold	Stephen Payton	Athletics	Men's 100m T37
Gold	David Holding	Athletics	Men's 100m T53
Gold	Nigel Bourne	Athletics	Men's 200m MH
Gold	Stephen Payton	Athletics	Men's 200m T37
Gold	Stephen Payton	Athletics	Men's 400m T37
Gold	Noel Thatcher	Athletics	Men's 5000m T11
Gold	Noel Thatcher	Athletics	Men's 10000m T11
Gold	Nigel Bourne	Athletics	Men's long jump MH
Gold	Stephen Miller	Athletics	Men's club throw F50
Gold	Kenneth Churchill	Athletics	Men's javelin F36
Gold	Caroline Innes	Athletics	Women's 100m T34-35
Gold	Tanni Grey	Athletics	Women's 800m T52
Gold	Joanna Jackson	Equestrian	Mixed dressage grade IV
Gold	Joanna Jackson	Equestrian	Mixed kur canter grade IV
Gold	Mixed	Equestrian	Mixed team open
Gold	Simon Jackson	Judo	Men's 78 kg
Gold	William Curran	Lawn bowls	Men's singles LB2
Gold	Samuel Shaw	Lawn bowls	Men's singles LB3-5
Gold	Alan Lyne	Lawn bowls	Men's singles LB7/8
Gold	Vera Moore	Lawn bowls	Women's singles LB2
Gold	Irene Cheer	Lawn bowls	Women's singles LB3-5
Gold	Rosa Crean	Lawn bowls	Women's singles LB7/8
Gold	Deanna Coates	Shooting	Women's air rifle standing SH1
Gold	James Anderson	Swimming	Men's 50m backstroke S2
Gold	Christopher Holmes	Swimming	Men's 50m freestyle B2
Gold	Christopher Holmes	Swimming	Men's 100m backstroke B2
Gold	Jody Cundy	Swimming	Men's 100m butterfly S10
Gold	Giles Long	Swimming	Men's 100m butterfly S8
Gold	Christopher Holmes	Swimming	Men's 100m freestyle B2
Gold	James Anderson	Swimming	Men's 100m freestyle S2
Gold	Tracy Wiscombe	Swimming	Women's 50m freestyle MH
Gold	Sarah Bailey	Swimming	Women's 100m backstroke S10
Gold	Sarah Bailey	Swimming	Women's 100m breaststroke SB10
Gold	Tracy Wiscombe	Swimming	Women's 100m freestyle MH
Gold	Jeanette Esling	Swimming	Women's 100m freestyle S6
Gold	Sarah Bailey	Swimming	Women's 200m medley SM10
Gold	Emily Jennings	Swimming	Women's 200m medley SM9
Gold	Melanie Easter	Swimming	Women's 400m freestyle B2
Gold	Jane Stidever; Margaret McEleny; Jeanette Esling; Jennifer Booth	Swimming	Women's 4x50m freestyle S1-6
Silver	Anita Chapman	Archery	Women's individual standing
Silver	Andrew Curtis	Athletics	Men's 200m T10
Silver	John Nethercott	Athletics	Men's 800m T37
Silver	Robert Matthews	Athletics	Men's 1500m T10
Silver	Mark Farnell	Athletics	Men's 10000m T12
Silver	Mark Farnell	Athletics	Men's marathon T12
Silver	Alan Earle	Athletics	Men's high jump F42-44
Silver	James Richardson	Athletics	Men's club throw F50
Silver	Paul Williams	Athletics	Men's javelin F34/37
Silver	Keith Gardner	Athletics	Men's javelin F35
Silver	David Dudley	Athletics	Men's shot put F54
Silver	Tanni Grey	Athletics	Women's 100m T52
Silver	Tanni Grey	Athletics	Women's 200m T52
Silver	Tanni Grey	Athletics	Women's 400m T52
Silver	Janice Lawton	Athletics	Women's shot put F32-33
Silver	Zoe Edge; Joyce Carle	Boccia	Mixed pairs C1 wad
Silver	Dianne Tubbs	Equestrian	Mixed dressage grade I
Silver	Elizabeth Stone	Equestrian	Mixed dressage grade III
Silver	Patricia Straughan	Equestrian	Mixed dressage grade IV
Silver	David Heddle	Lawn bowls	Men's singles LB3-5
Silver	George Wright	Lawn bowls	Men's singles LB7/8
Silver	Penny Tyler	Lawn bowls	Women's singles LB2
Silver	Deanna Coates	Shooting	Women's air rifle 3x20 SH1
Silver	Kenneth Cairns	Swimming	Men's 50m butterfly S3
Silver	James Anderson	Swimming	Men's 50m freestyle S2
Silver	Marc Woods	Swimming	Men's 100m backstroke S10
Silver	Andrew Lindsay	Swimming	Men's 100m backstroke S7
Silver	Sascha Kindred	Swimming	Men's 100m breaststroke SB7
Silver	Ian Sharpe	Swimming	Men's 100m butterfly B3
Silver	Alan McGregor	Swimming	Men's 100m freestyle S2
Silver	Tim Reddish	Swimming	Men's 200m medley B1
Silver	Christopher Holmes	Swimming	Men's 200m medley B2
Silver	Giles Long; Marc Woods; Paul Noble; Shaun Uren; Iain Mathew	Swimming	Men's 4 × 100 m medley S7-10
Silver	Margaret McEleny	Swimming	Women's 50m breaststroke SB3
Silver	Jeanette Esling	Swimming	Women's 50m freestyle S5
Silver	Elaine Barrett	Swimming	Women's 100m breaststroke B2
Silver	Margaret McEleny	Swimming	Women's 150m medley SM4
Silver	Elaine Barrett	Swimming	Women's 200m breaststroke B2
Silver	Sarah Bailey	Swimming	Women's 400m freestyle S10
Silver	Melanie Easter; Leanne Edmans; Janice Burton; Kirsty Stoneham	Swimming	Women's 4 × 100 m freestyle B1-3
Silver	Neil Robinson	Table tennis	Men's singles 3
Silver	Daniel Johnson; Malcolm Tarkenter; Joseph Jayaratne; Colin Price; David Bramley; Nigel Smith; Calum Gordon; Simon Munn; Mark Cheaney; Garry Peel; Anthony Woollard; Steven Caine	Wheelchair basketball	Men's team
Bronze	Rebecca Gale; Kathleen Smith; Anita Chapman	Archery	Women's teams open
Bronze	Andrew Curtis	Athletics	Men's 100m T10
Bronze	Paul Williams	Athletics	Men's 100m T32
Bronze	Paul Hughes	Athletics	Men's 100m T34
Bronze	Kenneth Colaine	Athletics	Men's 200m MH
Bronze	David Holding	Athletics	Men's 200m T53
Bronze	Richard Collins	Athletics	Men's 400m T34-35
Bronze	Mark Brown	Athletics	Men's marathon T42-46
Bronze	Stephen Payton; Mark Newton; Richard Collins; Gordon Robertson	Athletics	Men's 4 × 100 m relay T34-37
Bronze	Paul Williams	Athletics	Men's discus F34/37
Bronze	Kevan Baker	Athletics	Men's discus F55
Bronze	Mark Whiteley	Athletics	Men's javelin F11
Bronze	Dan West	Athletics	Men's shot put F32-33
Bronze	Kenneth Churchill	Athletics	Men's shot put F36
Bronze	Nicola Jarvis	Athletics	Women's 100m T53
Bronze	Nicola Jarvis	Athletics	Women's 200m T53
Bronze	Alice Basford	Athletics	Women's long jump F42-46
Bronze	Dianne Tubbs	Equestrian	Mixed kur trot grade I
Bronze	Anne Dunham	Equestrian	Mixed kur trot grade II
Bronze	Ian Rose	Judo	Men's 86 kg
Bronze	Terence Powell	Judo	Men's 95 kg
Bronze	Keith Brenton	Lawn bowls	Men's singles LB7/8
Bronze	Mary Elias	Lawn bowls	Women's singles LB7/8
Bronze	Anthony Peddle	Powerlifting	Men's 48 kg
Bronze	Alan McGregor	Swimming	Men's 50m backstroke S2
Bronze	Tim Reddish	Swimming	Men's 100m freestyle B1
Bronze	Giles Long	Swimming	Men's 200m medley SM8
Bronze	Christopher Fox	Swimming	Men's 400m freestyle B3
Bronze	Marc Woods	Swimming	Men's 400m freestyle S10
Bronze	Jane Stidever	Swimming	Women's 50m backstroke S5
Bronze	Janice Burton	Swimming	Women's 50m freestyle B1
Bronze	Victoria Broadribb	Swimming	Women's 50m freestyle S2
Bronze	Margaret McEleny	Swimming	Women's 50m freestyle S5
Bronze	Janice Burton	Swimming	Women's 100m butterfly B1
Bronze	Sarah Bailey	Swimming	Women's 100m freestyle S10
Bronze	Margaret McEleny	Swimming	Women's 100m freestyle S5
Bronze	Margaret McEleny	Swimming	Women's 200m freestyle S5
Bronze	Jeanette Esling	Swimming	Women's 200m freestyle S6
Bronze	Jennifer Booth; Jeanette Esling; Margaret McEleny; Jane Stidever	Swimming	Women's 4x50m medley S1-6
Bronze	James Rawson	Table tennis	Men's singles 3
Bronze	James Rawson; Neil Robinson	Table tennis	Men's teams 3

=== Medals by sport ===
Medals by Sport
Sport	Gold medal	Silver medal	Bronze medal	Total
Swimming	16	17	15	48
Athletics	12	14	16	42
Lawn Bowls	6	3	2	11
Equestrian	3	3	2	8
Shooting	1	1	0	2
Judo	1	0	2	3
Table tennis	0	1	2	3
Archery	0	1	1	2
Boccia	0	1	0	1
Wheelchair Basketball	0	1	0	1
Powerlifting	0	0	1	1
Total	39	42	41	122

=== Medals by gender ===
Medals by gender^{(Comparison graphs)}
Gender	Gold medal	Silver medal	Bronze medal	Total	Percentage
Male	21	24	24	69	56.6%
Female	17	17	17	51	41.8%
Mixed	1	1	0	2	1.6%
Total	41	43	47	131	100%

=== Multiple medallists ===
The following competitors won multiple medals at the 1996 Paralympic Games.

Name	Medal	Sport	Events
Sarah Bailey	Gold; Gold; Gold; Silver; Bronze	Swimming	Women's 100m backstroke S10; Women's 100m breaststroke SB10; Women's 200m medley SM10; Women's 400m freestyle S10; Women's 100m freestyle S10
Christopher Holmes	Gold; Gold; Gold; Silver	Swimming	Men's 50m freestyle B2; Men's 100m backstroke B2; Men's 100m freestyle B2; Men's 200m medley B2
Stephen Payton	Gold; Gold; Gold; Bronze	Athletics	Men's 100m T37; Men's 200m T37; Men's 400m T37; Men's 4 × 100 m relay T34-37
Jeanette Esling	Gold; Gold; Silver; Bronze; Bronze	Swimming	Women's 100m freestyle S6; Women's 4x50m freestyle S1-6; Women's 50m freestyle S5; Women's 50m freestyle S5; Women's 4x50m medley S1-6
James Anderson	Gold; Gold; Silver	Swimming	Men's 50m backstroke S2; Men's 100m freestyle S2; Men's 50m freestyle S2
Nigel Bourne	Gold; Gold; Silver	Athletics	Men's 200m MH; Men's long jump MH
Joanna Jackson	Gold; Gold	Equestrian	Mixed dressage grade IV; Mixed kur canter grade IV
Noel Thatcher	Gold; Gold	Athletics	Men's 5000m T11; Men's 10000m T11
Tracy Wiscombe	Gold; Gold	Swimming	Women's 50m freestyle MH; Women's 100m freestyle MH
Tanni Grey	Gold; Silver; Silver; Silver	Athletics	Women's 800m T52; Women's 100m T52; Women's 200m T52; Women's 400m T52
Margaret McEleny	Gold; Silver; Silver; Bronze; Bronze; Bronze; Bronze	Swimming	Women's 4x50m freestyle S1-6; Women's 50m breaststroke SB3; Women's 150m medley SM4; Women's 50m freestyle S5; Women's 100m freestyle S5; Women's 200m freestyle S5; Women's 4x50m medley S1-6
Giles Long	Gold; Silver; Bronze	Swimming	Men's 100m butterfly S8; Men's 4 × 100 m medley S7-10; Men's 200m medley SM8
Deanna Coates	Gold; Silver	Shooting	Women's air rifle standing SH1; Women's air rifle 3x20 SH1
Melanie Easter	Gold; Silver	Swimming	Women's 400m freestyle B2; Women's 4 × 100 m freestyle B1-3
Jane Stidever	Gold; Bronze	Swimming	Women's 4x50m freestyle S1-6; Women's 50m backstroke S5; Women's 4x50m medley S1-6
Kenneth Churchill	Gold; Bronze	Athletics	Men's javelin F36; Men's shot put F36
Anne Dunham	Gold; Bronze	Equestrian	Team open Mixed kur trot grade II
David Holding	Gold; Bronze	Athletics	Men's 100m T53; Men's 200m T53
Jennifer Booth	Gold; Gold; Bronze	Swimming	Women's 4x50m freestyle S1-6; Women's 4x50m medley S1-6
Marc Woods	Silver; Silver; Bronze	Swimming	Men's 100m backstroke S10; Men's 4 × 100 m medley S7-10; Men's 400m freestyle S10
Elaine Barrett	Silver; Silver	Swimming	Women's 100m breaststroke B2; Women's 200m breaststroke B2
Mark Farnell	Silver; Silver	Athletics	Men's 10000m T12; Men's marathon T12
Janice Burton	Silver; Bronze; Bronze	Swimming	Women's 4 × 100 m freestyle B1-3; Women's 50m freestyle B1; Women's 100m butterfly B1
Paul Williams	Silver; Bronze; Bronze	Athletics	Men's javelin F34/37; Men's 100m T32; Men's discus F34/37
Anita Chapman	Silver; Bronze	Archery	Women's Individual Standing; Women's Team Open
Andrew Curtis	Silver; Bronze	Athletics	Men's 200m T10; Men's 100m T10
Alan McGregor	Silver; Bronze	Swimming	Men's 100m freestyle S2; Men's 50m backstroke S2
Tim Reddish	Silver; Bronze	Swimming	Men's 200m medley B1; Men's 100m freestyle B1
Neil Robinson	Silver; Bronze	Table Tennis	Men's singles 3 Men's teams 3
Dianne Tubbs	Silver; Bronze	Equestrian	Mixed dressage grade I Mixed kur trot grade I
Richard Collins	Bronze; Bronze	Athletics	Men's 400m T34-35; Men's 4 × 100 m relay T34-37
Nicola Jarvis	Bronze; Bronze	Athletics	Women's 100m T53; Women's 200m T53
James Rawson	Bronze; Bronze	Table Tennis	Men's singles 3 Men's teams 3

== Events ==
=== Archery ===
==== Men ====
Athlete	Event	Ranking round		Round of 16	Quarterfinals	Semi-finals	Finals	
Athlete	Event	Score	Rank	Opposition Result	Opposition Result	Opposition Result	Opposition Result	Rank
Andrew Baylis	Men's Individual W2	574	17	Eriksson (SWE); L 135–139	did not advance			
James Buchanan	Men's Individual W2	600	6	Bye	Nossevych (UKR); L 137–141	did not advance		
Alexander Gregory	Men's Individual W2	570	18	Kubota (JPN); W 149–141	Walstra (NED); L 140–147	did not advance		
John Murray	Men's Individual Standing	528	18	Jonski (POL); W 134–128	Fudge (DEN); L 140–147	did not advance		
Andrew Baylis; James Buchanan; Alexander Gregory	Men's Teams W1/W2	N/A			Italy (ITA); L 212–233	did not advance		

==== Women ====
Athlete	Event	Ranking round		Quarterfinals	Semi-finals	Finals	
Athlete	Event	Score	Rank	Opposition Result	Opposition Result	Opposition Result	Rank
Anita Chapman	Women's Individual Standing	474	7	Morgensen (DEN); W 92–86	Yonezawa (JPN); W 97–93	Olejnik (POL); L 85–98	Silver medal
Rebecca Gale	Women's Individual W2	468	9	N/A	Matsueda (JPN); L 122–122 - {2} wins by tie break: 8:9	did not advance	
Kathleen Smith	Women's Individual Standing	545	1	Hybois (FRA); L 89–98	did not advance		
Anita Chapman; Rebecca Gale; Kathleen Smith	Women's Teams Open	N/A			Japan (JPN); L 203–211	Germany (GER); W 183–159	Bronze medal

=== Demonstration sports ===
Great Britain also won Gold for Sailing at the 1996 Summer Paralympics which became an official part of the Paralympic program in the Sydney 2000 Paralympic Games.

== See also ==
- Great Britain at the 1996 Summer Olympics
- Great Britain at the Paralympics
