= Athletics at the 2000 Summer Paralympics – Men's 100 metres T37 =

Men's 100 metres T37 at the XI Paralympic Games
- Venue: Stadium Australia
- Competitors: 19 from 16 nations
- Winning time: 11.99

Medalists
1st place, gold medalist(s)		Mohamed Allek	Algeria
2nd place, silver medalist(s)		Peter Haber	Germany
3rd place, bronze medalist(s)		Matt Slade	New Zealand

The men's 100 metres T37 took place in Stadium Australia.

There were three heats and one final round. The T37 is for athletes who have cerebral palsy or other coordination impairments, these athletes would have walk or run with a limp.

== Heats ==
Qualified for final round

=== Heat 1 ===
Rank	Athlete	Time	Notes
1	Peter Haber (GER)	12.34	
2	Matt Slade (NZL)	12.69	
3	Stephen Herbert (GBR)	12.79	
4	Pierre Francois Corosine (FRA)	13.18	
5	Cheung Yiu Cheung (HKG)	13.19	
6	Krysztof Zukierski (POL)	13.19	

=== Heat 2 ===
Rank	Athlete	Time	Notes
1	Laurent Escurat (FRA)	12.72	
2	Lu Yi (CHN)	12.74	
3	Ali Qambar Al Ansari (UAE)	12.91	
4	Michael Churm (GBR)	13.02	
5	Ahmed Ennammouri (MAR)	13.20	
6	Andy Shaw (CAN)	13.22	
7	Charles Mutinda (KEN)	14.29	

=== Heat 3 ===
Rank	Athlete	Time	Notes
1	Mohamed Allek (ALG)	12.21	
2	Ahmed Hassan Mahmoud (EGY)	12.69	
3	Rene Schramm (GER)	12.92	
4	Kieran Ault-Connell (AUS)	12.96	
5	Hong Duk Kwun (KOR)	13.13	
6	Gaston Torres (ARG)	13.44	

== Final round ==
Rank	Athlete	Time	Notes
1st place, gold medalist(s)	Mohamed Allek (ALG)	11.99	
2nd place, silver medalist(s)	Peter Haber (GER)	12.38	
3rd place, bronze medalist(s)	Matt Slade (NZL)	12.50	
4	Ahmed Hassan Mahmoud (EGY)	12.61	
5	Lu Yi (CHN)	12.69	
6	Stephen Herbert (GBR)	12.73	
7	Laurent Escurat (FRA)	12.83	
8	Ali Qambar Al Ansari (UAE)	13.04	
