= Scottish Disability Sports Hall of Fame =

The Scottish Disability Sport Hall of Fame, launched in 2012 by Scottish Disability Sport (SDS), is an accolade to recognize and honour the outstanding sporting achievements of Scotland's most distinguished athletes with a disability.

== History ==
The inaugural 20 members of the Scottish Disability Sport Hall of Fame were inducted in 2012, by Scottish Disability Sport (formerly the Scottish Sports Association for Disabled People), as the national sports body celebrated its 50th anniversary at its AGM. It was held at the Windlestrae Hotel in Kinross on 26 September 2012.

== Hall of Fame ==
=== 2012 ===
Athlete	Sport
Valerie Robertson	Archery; Athletics; Swimming; Wheelchair fencing
Willie McLeod	Athletics; Lawn Bowls
Michael McCreadie	Lawn Bowls; Wheelchair curling
Barbara Howie	Athletics
Jim Muirhead	Swimming
Tom Killin	Wheelchair curling Wheelchair fencing
Isabel Newstead MBE	Athletics; Shooting; Swimming
Mary Ann Low	Swimming
Kenny Cairns MBE	Swimming
Colin Keay	Athletics
Paul Noble MBE	Swimming
Maggie McEleny MBE	Swimming
Jim Anderson OBE	Swimming
Caroline Baird MBE	Athletics
Andrew Lindsay	Swimming
Stephen Payton	Athletics
David Heddle MBE	Lawn Bowls
Tracy Wiscombe	Swimming
Aileen McGlynn OBE	Road and Track cycling
Frank Duffy	Wheelchair curling

=== Post 2012 ===
Year	Athlete	Sport
2014	Libby Clegg	Athletics
2016	Neil Fachie	Track cycling

== Awards ==
Year	Findlay Calder Trophy (Athlete of the Year Award)	Brian Dolan Memorial Trophy (Swimmer of the Year Award)	Angus Trophy (Sports Person of the Year Award) (excluding athletics and swimming)	Gordon Brown Trophy (Athletes' Athlete)
2000	Nicky Diatchenko	Kenny Cairns	no award	no award
2001	Derek Frew	Andrew Lindsay	no award	no award
2002	Karen Lewis	Lara Ferguson	no award	no award
2003	Stephen Payton	Mhairi Love	David Heddle (Bowls)	no award
2004	Kenny Herriot	Jim Anderson	Scottish Wheelchair; Curling Team	Maggie McEleny (Swimming)
2005	Stephen Payton	Jim Anderson	Aileen McGlynn (Tandem cycling)	Jim Anderson (Swimming)
2006	Stephen Payton	Rebecca Lee	GB Para Wheelchair; Curling Team	Rebecca Lee (Swimming)
2007	Libby Clegg	Andrew Lindsay	Aileen McGlynn (Tandem cycling)	Kenny Cairns (Swimming); Peter McGuire (Boccia)
2008	Allan Stuart	Jim Anderson	Scottish CP Football Squad	Aileen McGlynn (Tandem cycling)
2009	Libby Clegg	Jim Anderson	Gordon Reid (Tandem cycling)	Stephen McGuire (Boccia); Peter McGuire (Boccia)
2010	Lauren Peffers	Sean Fraser	Stephen McGuire (Boccia)	Neil Fachie (Tandem cycling)
2011	Owen Miller	Andrew Mullen	Kevin Wallace (Bowls)	Aileen Neilson (Wheelchair curling)
2012	Libby Clegg	Andrew Mullen	Neil Fachie (Tandem cycling)	Libby Clegg (Track and field)
2013	Libby Clegg	Andrew Mullen	Jane Egan (Paratriathlon)	Neil Fachie (Tandem cycling)
2014	Libby Clegg	Andrew Mullen	Neil Fachie (Tandem cycling)	Andrew Mullen (Swimming)
2015	Samantha Kinghorn	Andrew Mullen	Neil Fachie (Tandem cycling)	Irene Edgar (Bowls)
2016	Libby Clegg	Andrew Mullen	Gordon Reid (Wheelchair tennis)	Gordon Reid (Wheelchair tennis)
2017	Samantha Kinghorn	Danielle Joyce	Martin Perry (Table tennis)	Samantha Kinghorn (Wheelchair athletics)
2018	Maria Lyle	Scott Quin	Neil Fachie (Cycling)	Gordon Reid
2019	Derek Rae	Scott Quin	Scottish Wheelchair Curling Team	Derek Rae
