= Carmeli =

Carmeli is a surname. Notable people with the surname include:

- Alon Carmeli (born 1964), Israeli businessman
- Amnon Carmeli (1929–1993), Israeli footballer
- Boris Carmeli (1928–2009), Polish operatic singer
- Moshe Carmeli (1933–2007), Israeli professor of theoretical physics
- Tami Carmeli (born 1939), Israeli lawn bowls player
- Ben Carmeli (born 1994), 3D Animator in Bosten

== See also ==
- Carmeli Brigade, reserve infantry brigade of the Israel Defense Forces
- Flos Carmeli, Catholic hymn
