= Athletics at the 2000 Summer Paralympics – Men's 100 metres T38 =

Men's 100 metres T38 at the XI Paralympic Games
- Venue: Stadium Australia
- Competitors: 10 from 8 nations
- Winning time: 11.56

Medalists
1st place, gold medalist(s)		Tim Sullivan	Australia
2nd place, silver medalist(s)		Mikhail Popov	Russia
3rd place, bronze medalist(s)		Stephen Payton	Great Britain

The men's 100 metres T38 took place in Stadium Australia.

There were two heats and one final round. The T38 is for athletes who have mild cerebral palsy or similar disabilities.

== Heats ==
Qualified for final round

=== Heat 1 ===
Rank	Athlete	Time	Notes
1	Tim Sullivan (AUS)	11.65	
2	Stephen Payton (GBR)	12.02	
3	Andriy Onufriyenko (UKR)	12.13	
4	Christer Lenander (SWE)	12.31	
5	Chan Shing Chung (HKG)	12.83	

=== Heat 2 ===
Rank	Athlete	Time	Notes
1	Mikhail Popov (RUS)	11.79	
2	Mario Swart (RSA)	12.39	
3	Darren Thrupp (AUS)	12.44	
4	Juan Ramon Carrapiso (ESP)	12.48	
5	Chao Kwok Pang (HKG)	13.64	

== Final round ==
Rank	Athlete	Time	Notes
1st place, gold medalist(s)	Tim Sullivan (AUS)	11.56	
2nd place, silver medalist(s)	Mikhail Popov (RUS)	11.62	
3rd place, bronze medalist(s)	Stephen Payton (GBR)	11.93	
4	Andriy Onufriyenko (UKR)	11.98	
5	Juan Ramon Carrapiso (ESP)	12.34	
6	Christer Lenander (SWE)	12.41	
7	Darren Thrupp (AUS)	12.42	
8	Mario Swart (RSA)	12.45	
