= SDS =

SDS may refer to:

== Organizations ==
=== Businesses ===
- Samsung SDS, formerly Samsung Data Systems
- Scientific Data Systems, a 1960s computer manufacturer, later called Xerox Data Systems
- Siberian Business Union, a Russian holding company
- Seamless Distribution Systems, a Swedish software company

=== Political organizations ===
- Sayuz na Demokratichnite Sili (Union of Democratic Forces), a political party in Bulgaria
- Slovenian Democratic Party, formerly the Social Democratic Party of Slovenia
- Sozialistischer Deutscher Studentenbund (Socialist German Student League), West Germany, 1960s
- Serb Democratic Party (Bosnia and Herzegovina)
- Serb Democratic Party (Croatia)
- Skills Development Scotland, a public body in Scotland
- Social Democratic Party (Serbia) (Socijaldemokratska stranka), a political party in Serbia
- Party of Democratic Socialism (Czech Republic) (Strana demokratického socialismu), a former political party in the Czech Republic
- Students for a Democratic Society, US, 1960
- Students for a Democratic Society (2006 organization), left-wing US student organization
- Society for Disability Studies

=== Other organizations ===
- Serbian State Guard (Srpska Državna Straža), 1942 to 1944
- Scottish Disability Sport; see Scottish Disability Sports Hall of Fame
- Society of the Divine Savior, a Catholic order founded in 1881
- Social and Decision Sciences (Carnegie Mellon University)
- Spartanburg Day School, Spartanburg, South Carolina, US
- Special Demonstration Squad, of the Metropolitan Police, London
- Studio Distribution Services, a home entertainment distribution company

== Science and medicine ==
- Safety data sheet, on chemicals
- Sodium dodecyl sulfate, a synthetic organic compound
  - SDS-PAGE, sodium dodecyl sulfate polyacrylamide gel electrophoresis
- Shwachman–Diamond syndrome, a congenital disorder
- Sudden death syndrome, a soybean disease

== Technology ==
- Satellite Data System, US military communications satellites
- Self Driving System, a technology kit required to convert a manual car into an autonomous car; see List of self-driving system suppliers
- Short data services, in Terrestrial Trunked Radio
- Slotted Drive Shaft, a special shank on a hammer drill bit; see Drill bit shank § SDS shank
- Software-defined storage, a marketing term for data storage
- Special Direct System, a drill bit fixing system
- Spoken dialog systems, technology allowing machines to converse with humans based on human voice and language

== Other uses ==
- Sado Airport, Japan, IATA airport code
- SafeDeposits Scotland, Tenancy deposit schemes (Scotland)
- SDS, sister station of SES (TV station)
- "S.D.S." (song), by Mac Miller
- Self-Directed Search, a measure of vocational interest by John L. Holland
- Sened language (ISO 639-3 language code)
- The Seven Deadly Sins (manga), Japanese manga and animated series
- Shankar Dayal Sharma, (1918–1999), former president of India
- Sit down start, in rock climbing
- Special Delivery Service, in the UK Postman Pat TV series
