= Alon Carmeli =

Israeli businessman

- אלון כרמלי
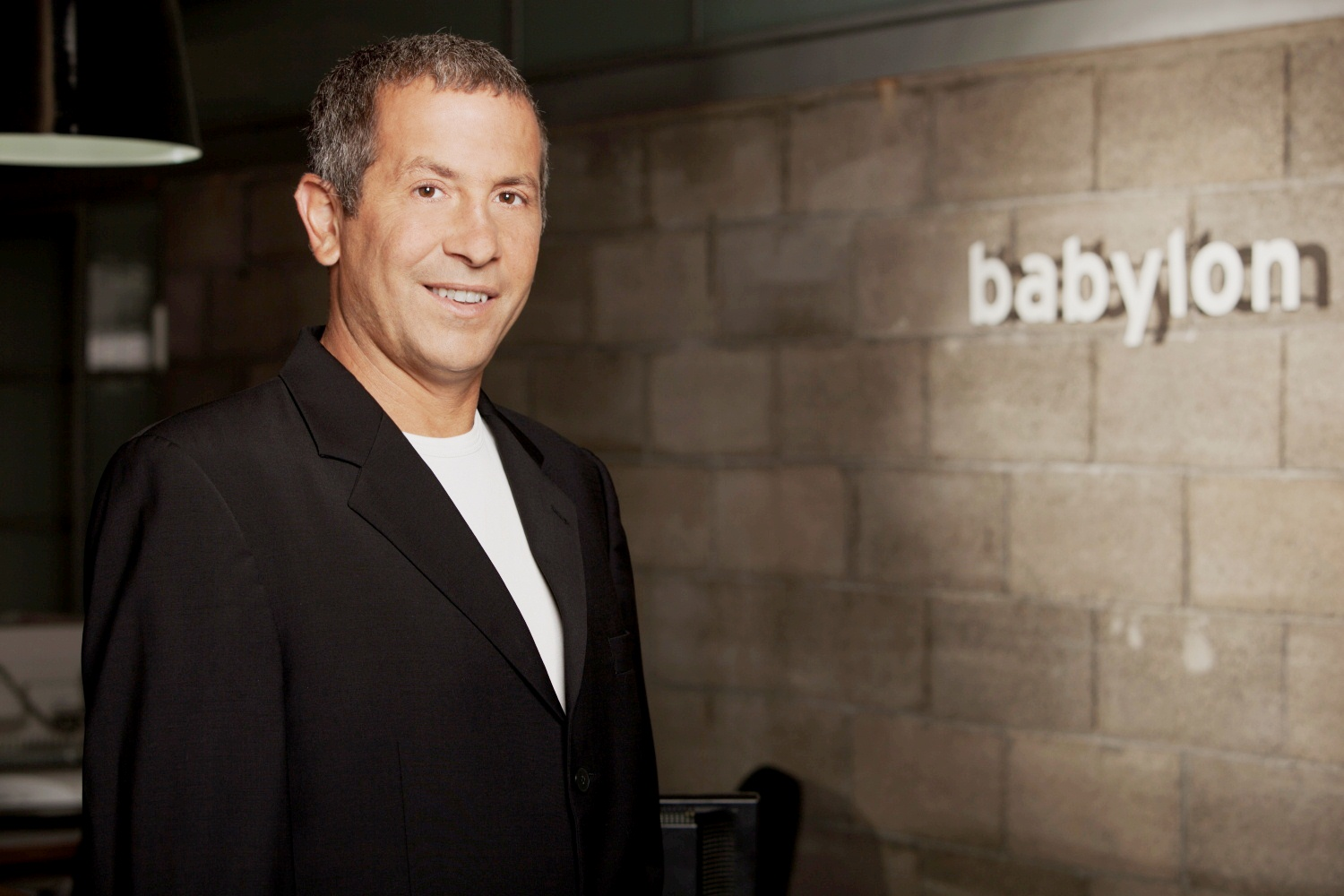
- Born: December 19, 1964 (age 61); Haifa, Israel
- Education: Hebrew Reali School, Tel Aviv University
- Occupation: Businessman
- Spouse: Nurit Lanir Carmeli

Alon Carmeli (Hebrew: אלון כרמלי; born December 19, 1964) is an Israeli businessman.

Carmeli was the CEO of Babylon Ltd, an online translation company. In 2012 Calcalist financial news site ranked Alon Carmeli as one of Israel's 50 best CEOs. Carmeli left Babylon in 2013.

Carmeli is a member of the board of directors in Adam Teva Vadin אדם טבע ודין.

Carmeli has served as a board member or an Active Chairman in several private as well as publicly traded companies among them Sapir Corp, Inner-Active, Cal (Israel Credit Cards) , Canzon and others.

== Biography ==
Alon Carmeli spent his formative years in Haifa, Israel.

Alon is the son of Amos Carmeli עמוס כרמלי, a journalist who won the Sokolov Award in 2000, and Tamar Carmeli תמי כרמלי, an athlete who has won medals in international championships and tournaments for the blind. Carmeli attended Hebrew Reali School of Haifa.

He holds an Executive MBA from the Tel Aviv University where he graduated with honors, as well as a BBus from the Business College, Tel Aviv.

Carmeli lives in Herzliya. He is married to Nurit, daughter of Avraham Lanir and sister of Noam Lanir and has four children.
