= Itzhak Baranes =

Israeli lawn bowls player

Personal information
- Native name: יצחק בראנס
- National team: Israel

Sport
- Country: Israel
- Sport: Lawn bowls
Medal record
Event	1st	2nd	3rd
Paralympic Games	0	0	1
IBD/IBBA World Championships	0	5	6
Lawn bowls
Representing Israel
Paralympic Games
Bronze medal – third place	1996 Atlanta	Men's singles LB6
IBBA World Championships
Silver medal – second place	1993 Canada	Mixed Pairs B1
Bronze medal – third place	2001 Girvan	Mixed Pairs B1
Silver medal – second place	2005 Johannesburg	Mixed Pairs B1
Silver medal – second place	2005 Johannesburg	Men's singles B1
Bronze medal – third place	2009 Melbourne	Mixed Pairs B1
IPC/IBD World Championships
Bronze medal – third place	1995 Aylesbury	Men's singles B1
Bronze medal – third place	1996 Atlanta	Men's singles B1
Bronze medal – third place	2002 Adelaide	Men's singles B1
Silver medal – second place	2002 Adelaide	Mixed Pairs B1
Silver medal – second place	2011 Pretoria	Mixed Pairs B1
Bronze medal – third place	2011 South Africa	Men's singles B1

Itzhak Baranes (Hebrew: יצחק בראנס) is an Israeli lawn bowls player.

== Career ==
Baranes was blinded in 1976 and began playing lawn bowls in 1989.

Baranes was the national champion in lawn bowls in classification B1 in the years 1994, 1995, 1999, 2000, 2001, 2004, 2006, 2010, 2011 and 2012.

Baranes took part in the International Blind Bowls Association World Championships of 1993, 1997, 2001, 2005 and 2009, winning three silver medals and two bronze. He also competed in the world championships of the International Paralympic Committee in the years 1995, 1996, 1998, 2002, 2007, 2011 and 2015, winning medals in both singles' tournaments and in the mixed pairs events.

At the 1996 Atlanta Paralympics, Baranes won bronze in the lawn bowls men's singles LB6 event.

In the years 2000, 2006 and 2008 he was named "Athlete of the Year" by the Ministry of Culture and Sport.
