= Lawn bowls at the 1996 Summer Paralympics =

Lawn bowls at the X Paralympic Games
- Paralympic Lawn bowls
- Competitors: 64 from 11 nations

Paralympic symbol (1994–2004)

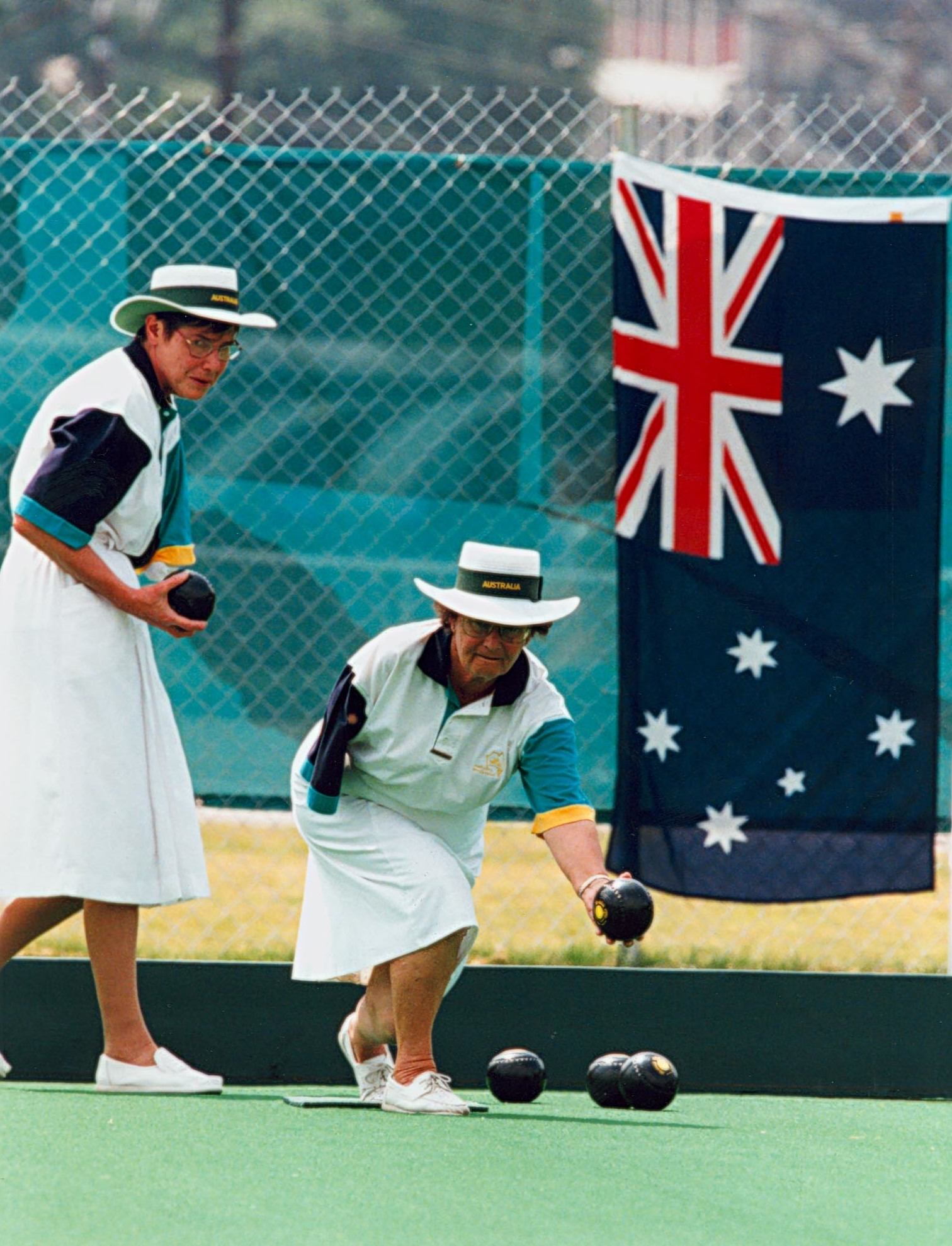
Australian competitors at the 1996 Summer Paralympics

Lawn bowls at the 1996 Summer Paralympics consisted of eight events.

== Medal table ==
Rank	Nation	Gold	Silver	Bronze	Total
1	Great Britain (GBR)	6	3	2	11
2	South Africa (RSA)	1	2	1	4
3	Canada (CAN)	1	1	0	2
4	Australia (AUS)	0	1	1	2
4	Hong Kong (HKG)	0	1	1	2
6	Israel (ISR)	0	0	2	2
7	South Korea (KOR)	0	0	1	1
Totals (7 entries)		8	8	8	24

=== Participating nations ===
- Australia (5)
- Canada (10)
- Great Britain (17)
- Hong Kong (5)
- Ireland (4)
- Israel (3)
- Kenya (1)
- New Zealand (2)
- South Africa (11)
- South Korea (4)
- United States (2)

== Medal summary ==
Event	Gold	Silver	Bronze
Men's singles LB2	William Curran; Great Britain	Willem Niemann; South Africa	Chul Lim; South Korea
Men's singles LB3-5	Samuel Shaw; Great Britain	David Heddle; Great Britain	Lun Chiu; Hong Kong
Men's singles LB6	Lance McDonald; Canada	Ronald Philipps; South Africa	Itzhak Baranes; Israel
Men's singles LB7/8	Alan Lyne; Great Britain	George Wright; Great Britain	Keith Brenton; Great Britain
Women's singles LB2	Vera Moore; Great Britain	Penny Tyler; Great Britain	Margaret Harriman; South Africa
Women's singles LB3-5	Irene Cheer; Great Britain	June Clark; Australia	Pauline Cahill; Australia
Women's singles LB6	Deirdre Buller; South Africa	Vivian Berkeley; Canada	Tami Carmeli; Israel
Women's singles LB7/8	Rosa Crean; Great Britain	Lai Tang; Hong Kong	Mary Elias; Great Britain
