= Peter Haber (athlete) =

German paralympian

Medal record

Paralympic athletics

Representing Germany

Paralympic Games
Gold medal – first place	1992 Barcelona	100 metres - C7
Gold medal – first place	1992 Barcelona	200 metres - C7
Gold medal – first place	1992 Barcelona	400 metres - C7
Silver medal – second place	1992 Barcelona	Long Jump - C7-8
Silver medal – second place	1996 Atlanta	100 metres - T36
Silver medal – second place	1996 Atlanta	200 metres - T36
Silver medal – second place	1996 Atlanta	Long Jump - F34-37
Silver medal – second place	2000 Sydney	100 metres - T37

Peter Haber is a paralympic athlete from Germany competing mainly in category T37 sprint events.

== Biography ==
Haber has competed in three Paralympics, winning at least one medal at each. His first games were in 1992 where he won three track golds in 100m, 200m and 400m and a silver in the long jump as well as being part of the German 4 × 100 m relay team. In 1996 he won three more silvers in the 10om, 200m and long jump. This was followed in 2000 where he won a silver in the 100m and missed out in the relay and 200m.
