= Heindrich Swanepol =

British Paralympic athlete

Medal record

Paralympic athletics

Representing United Kingdom

Paralympic Games
Bronze medal – third place	2000 Sydney	Javelin Throw - F12

Heindrich Swanepol is a Paralympic athlete from Great Britain competing mainly in category F12 javelin events.

Heindrich won a bronze medal in the F12 javelin at the 2000 Summer Paralympics in Sydney.
