= Michael Alston =

Australian disabled fencer

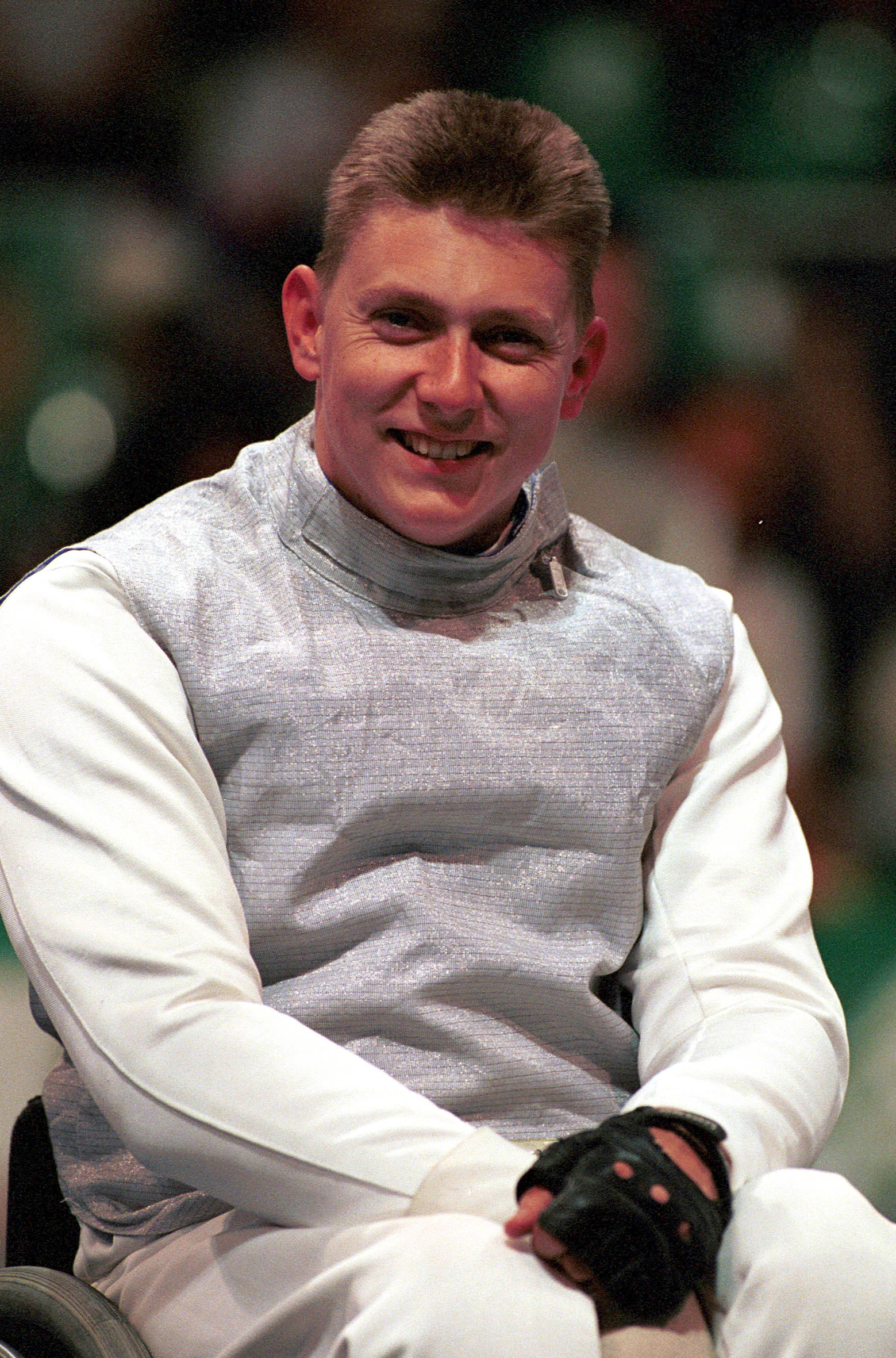
- Portrait of Alston at the 2000 Sydney Paralympics
Medal record
Representing Australia
Disabled fencing
FESPIC Games
| Silver medal – second place | 1998 | team |
Stoke Mandeville Games
| Gold medal – first place | 1998 | Foil |
DEFI Sport Event
| Silver medal – second place | 1998 | Epee |
| Bronze medal – third place | 1998 | Sabre |

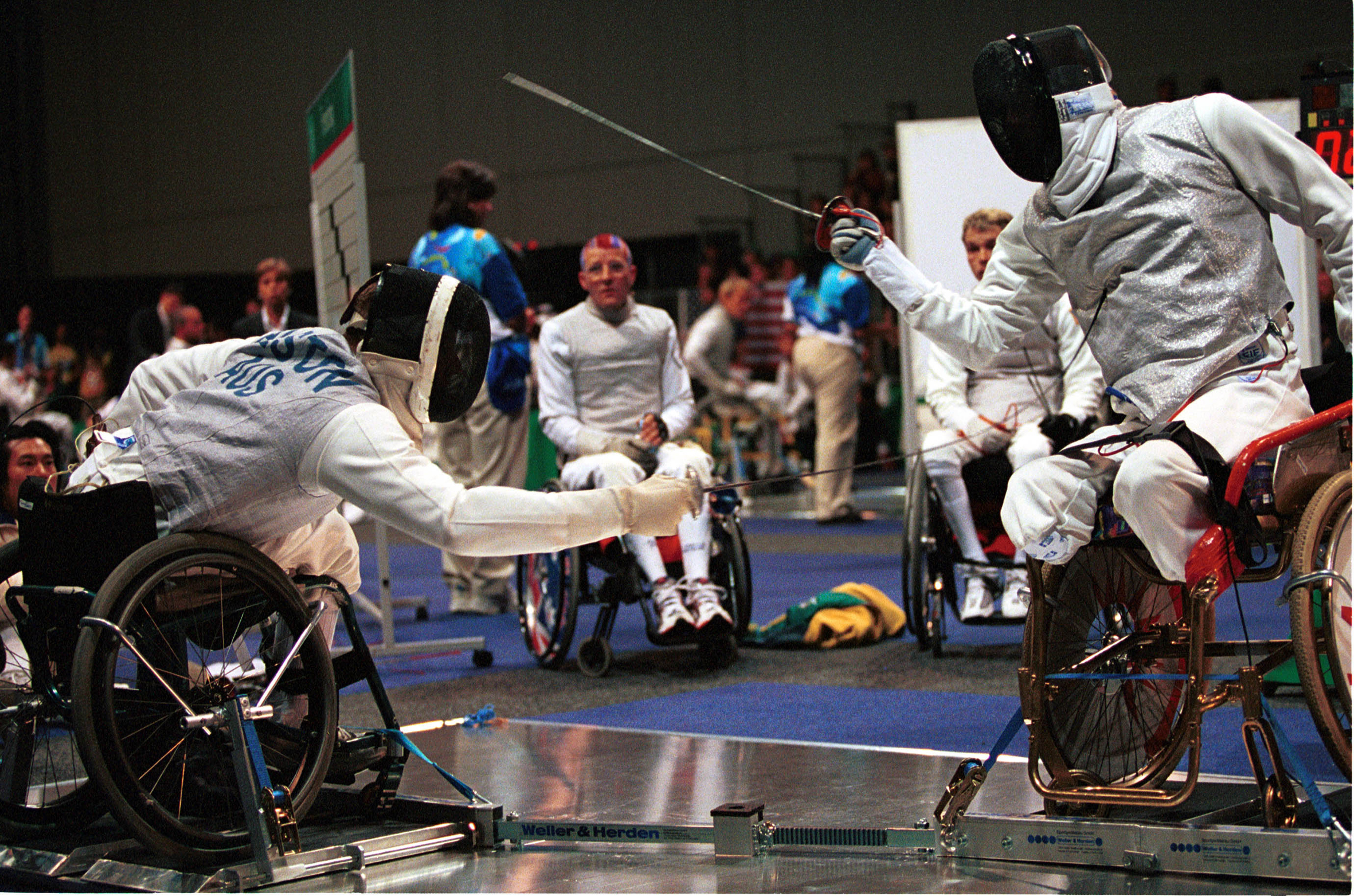
Alston in competition at the 2000 Sydney Paralympics

Michael Alston is an Australian disabled fencer. He competed in the 1998 FESPIC Games and won a silver team medal. At the 1998 Stoke Mandeville Games, he won a gold medal in the foil event. That same year, he also competed at the DEFI Sport Event held in Canada. He won a silver medal in the épée event and a bronze medal in the sabre event. He was supported by the Blacktown City Council and was coached by Sally Kopiec.

At the 2000 Sydney Paralympics he represented Australia in the Men's Foil Individual A and Men's Sabre Individual A but did not medal.

== Bibliography ==
- Australian Paralympic Committee (1999). "Fencing". Australian Paralympic Committee Annual Report (1998 ed.). Australia: Australian Paralympic Committee.
