= Stephen Cooper (athlete) =

British Paralympic athlete

Medal record

Paralympic athletics

Representing United Kingdom

Paralympic Games
| Silver medal – second place | 2000 Sydney | 4x100 metre relay - T38 |
| Bronze medal – third place | 2000 Sydney | 800 metres - T38 |

Stephen Cooper is a paralympic athlete from Great Britain competing mainly in category T38 middle-distance events.

Stephen competed in the 2000 Summer Paralympics where he won a bronze medal in the T38 800m and a silver medal as part of the 4 × 100 m team. Four years later he returned to the 2004 games where he was unable to medal in his only event, the 800m.
