= Sally Reddin =

British Paralympic athlete

Medal record

Paralympic athletics

Representing United Kingdom

Paralympic Games
Gold medal – first place	2000 Sydney	Shot Put - F52-54

Sally Reddin is a Paralympic athlete from Great Britain competing mainly in category F54 shot put events.

Reddin competed in the shot put and javelin events at the 1996 Summer Paralympics. She then went on to win the gold medal four years later in 2000 in the shot put but was unable to defend the title, finishing fourth in the 2008 Summer Paralympics.
