= Rosa Crean =

British Paralympian

Personal information
- Nationality: British
- Born: Triandafilia Toprkopul; 22 March 1942 (age 84) Macedonia, Greece
Medal record
Lawn bowls
Representing Great Britain
Paralympic Games
Gold medal – first place	1996 Atlanta	Women's singles LB7/8

Rosa Crean (born Triandafilia Toprkopul; 22 March 1942) is a British Paralympian. She competed in lawn bowling at the 1996 Summer Paralympics, winning a gold medal for Great Britain.

== Early life ==
Crean was born as Triandafilia Toprkopul in the Macedonian mountains of Greece on 22 March 1942. Growing up, her father was imprisoned in Albania while her mother and brother were abducted by communist partisans and taken to Poland. She was separated from her brother in a separate orphanage and her mother until she was eight. Due to an ear infection, she became partially deaf and visually impaired.

== Sporting career ==
At the 1996 Atlanta Paralympics, Crean won gold in the lawn bowls women's singles LB7/8.

She made her Commonwealth Games debut at the age of 72 at Glasgow 2014, representing Wales, although she failed to win a medal.
