= Emma Mounkley =

British Paralympic swimmer

Personal information
- Full name: Emma Jayne Mounkley
- National team: United Kingdom
- Born: Stockport, Great Britain

Sport
- Sport: Swimming
- Strokes: Freestyle, breaststroke, butterfly, individual medley
- Club: Stockport Metro
Medal record
Paralympic swimming
Representing United Kingdom
Paralympic Games
Silver medal – second place	2000 Sydney	Women's 50m butterfly S14
Silver medal – second place	2000 Sydney	Women's 50m freestyle S14
Bronze medal – third place	2000 Sydney	Women's 200m individual medley SM14
World Championships
Silver medal – second place	1998 Christchurch	Women's 50m freestyle S14
Silver medal – second place	1998 Christchurch	Women's 50m butterfly S14
Silver medal – second place	1998 Christchurch	Women's 50m breaststroke SB14
Silver medal – second place	1998 Christchurch	Women's 100m freestyle S14
Silver medal – second place	1998 Christchurch	Women's 200m individual medley SM14
Silver medal – second place	1998 Christchurch	Women's 4x50m medley relay S14
Silver medal – second place	1998 Christchurch	Women's 4x100m freestyle relay S14
Silver medal – second place	2002 Mar del Plata	Women's 100m backstroke S14
Bronze medal – third place	1998 Christchurch	Women's 50m backstroke S14
INAS World Swimming Championships
Gold medal – first place	2004 Hong Kong	Women's 50m breaststroke
Bronze medal – third place	2004 Hong Kong	Women's 50m freestyle
Bronze medal – third place	2004 Hong Kong	Women's 50m backstroke
Bronze medal – third place	2004 Hong Kong	Women's 50m butterfly
Bronze medal – third place	2004 Hong Kong	Women's 100m freestyle
INAS European Open Swimming Championships
Gold medal – first place	2002 Liberec	Women's 50m freestyle
Gold medal – first place	2002 Liberec	Women's 50m backstroke
Gold medal – first place	2002 Liberec	Women's 50m butterfly
Gold medal – first place	2002 Liberec	Women's 100m backstroke
Gold medal – first place	2002 Liberec	Women's 4x50m freestyle relay
Gold medal – first place	2002 Liberec	Women's 4x50m medley relay
Gold medal – first place	2002 Liberec	Women's 4x100m medley relay
Silver medal – second place	2002 Liberec	Women's 100m freestyle

Emma Jayne Mounkley (born 1981) is a former British Paralympic swimmer who competed in international level events.
