= Laurent Escurat =

French Paralympic athlete

Medal record

Men's para athletics

Representing France

Paralympic Games
Silver medal – second place	2000 Sydney	4x400 metre relay - T38

Laurent Escurat is a paralympic athlete from France competing mainly in category T37 sprints events.

Laurent competed in the 2000 Summer Paralympics in both the 100m and 200m before taking part in both relays winning a silver medal with the French 4 × 400 m relay team for category T38 athletes.
