= Pauline Latto =

British Paralympic athlete

Medal record

Paralympic athletics

Representing United Kingdom

Paralympic Games
Silver medal – second place	2000 Sydney	Javelin Throw - F37

Pauline Latto is a paralympic athlete from Great Britain competing mainly in category F37 javelin events.

Pauline competed in the javelin in both the 2000 and 2004 Summer Paralympics winning a silver medal in the earlier.
