= Marc Woods =

British Paralympic swimmer

Personal information
- Nationality: Great Britain
- Website: MarcWoods.com

Sport
- Sport: Swimming
Medal record
Men's para swimming
Representing Great Britain
Paralympic Games
Gold medal – first place	1988 Seoul	4 × 100 m freestyle relay A–L
Gold medal – first place	1988 Seoul	4 × 100 m medley relay A–L
Gold medal – first place	2000 Sydney	4×100 m freestyle 34 pts
Gold medal – first place	2004 Athens	4x100 m freestyle 34 pts
Silver medal – second place	1988 Seoul	4 × 50 m medley relay A1–A8
Silver medal – second place	1992 Barcelona	100 m backstroke S10
Silver medal – second place	1996 Atlanta	100 m backstroke S10
Silver medal – second place	1996 Atlanta	4x100 m Medley S7-10
Silver medal – second place	2000 Sydney	4×100 m medley 34 pts
Bronze medal – third place	1988 Seoul	4 × 50 m freestyle relay A1–A8
Bronze medal – third place	1988 Seoul	100 m backstroke A4
Bronze medal – third place	1996 Atlanta	400 m freestyle S10

Marc Woods is a British former swimmer, who competed at five Paralympic Games, (Seoul 1988, Barcelona 1992, Atlanta 1996, Sydney 2000, Athens 2004) winning 12 medals.

== Early life ==
Born in Cleethorpes on the 1st February 1969 Marc Patrick Woods is the son of Maurice and Patricia Woods. A swimmer at county-level, Marc was diagnosed with an osteosarcoma as a teenager. Aged 17, he had his right foot amputated as a result of the cancer and underwent intensive chemotherapy at the Western Park Hospital in Sheffield. Following his amputation, the day after having his stitches removed, he returned to the pool coaches by his father. Within a year, he was swimming faster times with one foot than he previously had with two, and just 18 months after he finished his chemotherapy he was selected to represent Great Britain at the Seoul Paralympics.

== Sporting career ==
Woods subsequently competed at European & World Championships and Paralympic Games. He was coached by three coaches over his career. Initially his father whilst he lived at home, then Doug Campbell at Barnet Coptahll Swimming Club and Millfield School and then finally with Lars Humer at the Manchester Aquatic Centre. In his 17 years of competition he won 12 Paralympic medals from five Paralympic Games held in Seoul, Barcelona, Atlanta, Sydney and Athens, and four of those medals being gold. Woods also won a further 21 medals from European and World Championships.

== Corporate career ==
After he retired from international swimming in 2004, he went on to commentate for both BBC Sport and Channel4 at the Paralympics in Beijing, London, Rio and Tokyo. At the same time he developed a successful consultancy business delivering team effectiveness solutions and executive coaching. Woods has delivered leadership solutions for many organizations such as the RBS, Barclays, IBM, Adidas, GSK, John Lewis Partnership, etc. He also travels extensively keynote addresses as a motivational speaker.

== Not for Profit Work ==
- Chair of the Chartered Institute for the Management of Sport and Physical Activity 2017–Present
- A long-term supporter of the charity Woods was a trustee of Teenage Cancer Trust for 3 years
- Board Member of the Youth Sports Trust for 9 years
- Ambassador for CANSA (South Africa's Cancer Charity)
- Patron of the Bone Cancer Research Trust
- Founding member of the British Athletes Council

== Personal life ==
He grew up on Station Road in North Thoresby.

Woods married Petra Karina Markell in 2008 and has a daughter Evie Clementine and a son Harry Maurice. Once retired from swimming he embarked on a series of new challenges such as developing mountaineering skills by trekking on Nepal, Ecuador and Peru. He also climbed the world's highest volcano Cotopaxi in Ecuador, Mont Pelvoux part of the Massif des Ecrins in France and the 22,200 ft Mera Peak in Nepal.

== Accomplishments ==
- Ambassador for London 2012 Olympics
- Member of the British Paralympic Advisory Panel for London 2012 Games
- Honorary Doctorate by Middlesex University
- Freeman of the City of London
- Honorary Citizen of Pensacola – Florida

== Publications ==
- "Personal Best: 10 life lessons to help you discover the real you", 2005
- "Where do all the paper clips go?....and 127 other business and career conundrums", 2007 (co-authored with Steve Coomber)
- "Personal Best: How to Achieve your Full Potential (2nd Edition)", 2011
- "Beyond the Call: Why some of your team go the extra mile and other don't show", 2013 (co-authored with Steve Coomber)
