= Melanie Easter =

British Paralympic swimmer

Personal information
- Born: Warwick, Warwickshire, England

Sport
- Country: United Kingdom
- Sport: Paralympic swimming
- Disability class: S12
Medal record
Women's paralympic swimming
Representing United Kingdom
Paralympic Games
Gold medal – first place	1996 Atlanta	400m freestyle B2
Gold medal – first place	2000 Sydney	400m freestyle S12
Silver medal – second place	1996 Atlanta	4x100m freestyle relay B1-3
Silver medal – second place	2000 Sydney	100m freestyle S12
Bronze medal – third place	2000 Sydney	200m individual medley SM12
World Championships
Silver medal – second place	2002 Mar del Plata	400m freestyle S12
Women's paratriathlon
World Championships
Gold medal – first place	2008 Vancouver	AWAD PC6

Melanie Easter is a British paralympic swimmer, runner and more recently a cyclist. She represented the United Kingdom as a swimmer at the 1996 and 2000 Paralympic games. She won a gold and silver for events at the 1996 games in Atlanta, and gold, silver and bronze medals for at the Sydney Paralympics in 2000. Additionally an accomplished runner, Easter took up cycling competitively in 2007, and the following year competed in the World Triathlon Championships in Vancouver where she attained a gold.

Easter grew up in the Warwickshire town of Kenilworth and attended Exhall Grange School, a school for visually impaired students near Coventry. Easter; the pink house at the school is named after her. She has a degree from the University of Birmingham.
