= Stephen Herbert (athlete) =

British Paralympic athlete

Medal record

Paralympic athletics

Representing United Kingdom

Paralympic Games
Silver medal – second place	2000 Sydney	4x100 metre relay - T38

Stephen Herbert is a British paralympic athlete, competing mainly in category T37 sprint events.

Herbert competed in the 100m and 200m at the 2000 Summer Paralympics. He also competed as part of the silver medal-winning British T38 4 × 100 m relay team.
