= Tim Reddish =

British Paralympic swimmer (born 1957)

Tim Reddish CBE DL
Personal information
- Full name: Timothy Robert Reddish
- National team: Great Britain
- Born: 12 April 1957 (age 69) Nottingham, England

Sport
- Sport: Swimming
- Classifications: B2
Medal record
Paralympic Games
Silver medal – second place	1992 Barcelona	100 m Butterfly B1-2
Silver medal – second place	1996 Atlanta	200 m Medley B1
Silver medal – second place	2000 Sydney	4x100 m Medley S11-13
Bronze medal – third place	1992 Barcelona	100 m Freestyle B2
Bronze medal – third place	1996 Atlanta	100 m Freestyle B1

Timothy Robert Reddish CBE DL (born 12 April 1957) is an English sports administrator and former Paralympic swimmer who was the Chairman of the British Paralympic Association. Governing Board member International Paralympic Committee. He won a total of five medals at three Paralympic Games.

== Personal history ==
Reddish was born in Nottingham in 1957. He became a leisure centre manager for Nottingham City Council and a sports development officer. In 1988, at the age of 31 he was diagnosed with retinitis pigmentosa, a hereditary degenerative condition affecting his sight. By 1996 he lost his vision completely, but in 2013 he underwent surgery in which an artificial retina was inserted into his eye which has enabled him to regain partial sight.

== Swimming career ==
Reddish had been a keen swimmer as a youth, and when his sight deteriorated he decided to become classified as a disability swimmer. Initially classed as a B2 athlete with reduced vision, he entered his first international tournament, the European Championships in Switzerland, in 1989. There he won 11 medals, including two gold. Reddish first represented Great Britain at a Summer Paralympics at Barcelona in 1992. In Spain Reddish won two medals, a silver in the 100m butterfly B1-B2 and a bronze in the 100m freestyle. Four years later he competed at the 1996 Summer Paralympics in Atlanta. Competing in five events, and now swimming as a B1 athlete (completely blind), he matched his achievements from Barcelona with another silver and bronze, this time in the 200m medley and the 100m freestyle. His final Paralympics as a competitor were the 2000 Games in Sydney. There he collected his fifth and final medal, winning silver in the men's 4 × 100 m Medley for S11-13 category swimmers.

== As sports administrator ==
In 1998 Reddish was appointed the National coordinator of British Swimming and in 2003 he became National Performance Director for the Disability Swim Team. Following the success of the British team at Beijing he left his post as Performance Director to become Chairman of the British Paralympic Association. He was also a board member of London Organising Committee of the Olympic and Paralympic Games (LOCOG). Tim is currently a Governing Board Member of the International Paralympic Committee (IPC).

== Awards ==
In 2001 Reddish was appointed a MBE for his services to swimming. In 2005 he was awarded Freeman of the City of Nottingham. He was appointed Officer of the Order of the British Empire (OBE) in the 2008 New Year Honours and Commander of the Order of the British Empire (CBE) in the 2017 New Year Honours for services to sport. appointed at Deputy Lieutenant of Nottinghamshire (DL) 2019.
