= Mark Brown (athlete) =

British Paralympic athlete

Medal record

Track and field (athletics)

Representing United Kingdom

Paralympic Games
Silver medal – second place	2000 Sydney	Marathon - T46
Bronze medal – third place	1996 Atlanta	5000m - T42-46

Mark Brown is a paralympic athlete from Great Britain competing mainly in category T46 long-distance events. He has also represented Gibraltar.

Mark Brown was born in 1962 in Burnley, England.

Brown competed at three Paralympics. In the 1996 Summer Paralympics he combined the 5000m and marathon, winning a bronze medal in the T42-46 marathon. In the 2000 Summer Paralympics he concentrated on the marathon where he won a silver in the T46 class and in the 2004 Summer Paralympics he concentrated on the 5000m but did not win a medal.

In 2002 Brown moved to Gibraltar to live with his brother and his family and to work as a mental health nurse. In 2003 Brown won European Gold medal in the 5000m Assen Netherlands. In 2005 Briwn competed in the highest marathon in the world Mount Everest marathon from Gorak Shep to Namche Bazaar. In 2006 he competed in the World Road Running Championships, representing Gibraltar.
