= Kenny Churchill =

British athlete

Medal record

Men's athletics

Representing the United Kingdom

Paralympic Games
Gold medal – first place	1996 Atlanta	Javelin throw F36
Gold medal – first place	2000 Sydney	Javelin throw F36
Gold medal – first place	2004 Athens	Javelin throw F36
Bronze medal – third place	1992 Barcelona	Javelin throw F36
Bronze medal – third place	1996 Atlanta	Shot put F36

Kenny Churchill (born 10 May 1975) is a British athlete from Middlesbrough, England, who competes in the javelin throw and shot put in the F37 category of Paralympic events. He is a member of Durham AC.

He has competed in five Summer Paralympics, winning a bronze in 1992 in Barcelona and gold in 1996 in Atlanta, 2000 in Sydney a 2004 in Athens setting a new world record with a throw of 48.09 in the javelin. He won bronze in shot put in 1996 and finished in 6th place in javelin at the 2008 Paralympics. He also won gold at the International Paralympic Committee Athletics World Championships of 2002, and silver at the 2006 edition of the same Games.
