= Anthony Peddle =

British Paralympic Powerlifter

Personal information
- Nationality: British
- Born: 11 May 1971 (age 55) Northampton, United Kingdom

Sport
- Country: Great Britain
- Sport: Powerlifting
- Event: -48 kg Category
Medal record
Representing Great Britain
Men's powerlifting
Paralympic Games
Gold medal – first place	2000 Sydney	−48 kg
Bronze medal – third place	1992 Barcelona	−48 kg
Bronze medal – third place	1996 Atlanta	−48 kg
IPC World Championships
Silver medal – second place	1994 Uppsala	−48 kg
Silver medal – second place	1998 Dubai	−48 kg

Anthony Peddle (born 11 May 1971) was a British Paralympic powerlifter. Peddle competed in seven Summer Paralympic Games a record number for a British athlete. He won gold at the 2000 Games in Sydney and a bronze medal in both the 1992 and 1996 Games.

== Personal history ==
Peddle was born in Northampton in 1971. He has spina bifida.

== Sporting career ==
Peddle took up weightlifting whilst a teenager. At the age of 17 he was selected to compete for the Great Britain team at the 1988 Summer Paralympics at Seoul. Four years later he won his first Paralympic medal, a bronze in the 52kg weightlifting at Barcelona. In 1994 Peddle won silver at the IPC Powerlifting World Championships in Uppsala in the 48 kg category. He then added a second Paralympic bronze medal at the 1996 Game in Atlanta. He continued his run of medals with another second place at the 1998 IPC Powerlifting World Championships.

At the 2000 Summer Paralympics in Sydney, Peddle set a new world record of 168 kg in the -48 kg, winning the gold medal in the process. This would be his last major medal though Peddle would go on to compete in three more Paralympics ending his career on home soil at the 2012 Games in London. As well as representing Great Britain, Peddle took part in one Commonwealth Games as part of the England team. There he competed in the Bench Press, finishing eleventh.
