= Noel Thatcher =

British Paralympic runner

Noel Thatcher MBE
Personal information
- Education: Exhall Grange School
- Occupation(s): British paralympic runner (1984–2004); Physiotherapist
Medal record
Para athletics
Representing Great Britain
Paralympic Games
Gold medal – first place	1988 Seoul	B2 800m
Gold medal – first place	1992 Barcelona	B2 1500m
Gold medal – first place	1996 Atlanta	T11 5000m
Gold medal – first place	1996 Atlanta	T11 10000m
Gold medal – first place	2000 Sydney	T12 5000m
Silver medal – second place	1984 New York/Stoke Mandeville	B3 400m
Silver medal – second place	1988 Seoul	B2 1500m
Silver medal – second place	1992 Barcelona	B1-B3 4 × 400m relay
Bronze medal – third place	1992 Barcelona	B2 800m
Bronze medal – third place	2000 Sydney	T12 10000m

Noel Thatcher MBE is a British Paralympic runner who represented the United Kingdom at six Paralympic Games between 1984 and 2004, collecting a total of five gold medals. His two career highlights are winning gold and setting a world record at Barcelona in 1992, and winning the 5k race in Sydney in 2000, again setting a world record. At the 2004 Games in Athens, he carried the flag for the Great Britain team at the opening ceremony.

== Early life ==
Thatcher, who is visually impaired, attended a mainstream primary school where he encountered difficulties with his studies because of his vision. At ten he was sent to Exhall Grange School near Coventry, a specialist school for visually impaired students, and it was here that he developed his athletic skills. Thatcher has said that he was made to run five miles every day for a month as a punishment after he was caught smoking aged twelve, and this helped him to become a proficient runner.

== Career ==
He made his athletics debut at seventeen at a national school championships after being persuaded to attend by a friend, and won a gold medal. He went on to represent the United Kingdom at the Paralympics in 1984, winning silver in the B3 400m.

At the 1988 Seoul Paralympics, Thatcher won gold in the B2 800m and silver in the B2 1500m, behind Mariano Ruiz of Spain.

Four years later at Barcelona 1992, he took the gold medal in the B2 1500m; the silver in the B1-B3 4 × 400m relay alongside Simon Butler, Andrew Curtis and Mark Whiteley; and the bronze in the B2 800m.

Thatcher was a double gold medal winner at Atlanta 1996, triumphing in the T11 5000m and 10,000m.

At the 2000 Sydney Games, in the T12 class, Thatcher took gold in the 5000m and bronze in the 10,000m.

Thatcher carried the flag for Great Britain at the opening ceremony of Athens 2004, and competed in the T12 5000m and T13 10,000m, narrowly missing out on a medal by finishing fourth in both finals.

== Personal life ==
Thatcher met his wife Yumi while studying Japanese at London's School of Oriental and African Studies. Away from athletics, Thatcher works as a physiotherapist at the Holly House Hospital in Buckhurst Hill, Essex.

== Honours ==
His achievements at the 1996 Olympics in Atlanta led to him being appointed a Member of the Most Excellent Order of the British Empire (MBE) in the 1997 New Year Honours for services to athletics for disabled people. He was inducted into the England Athletics Hall of Fame in 2009.
