= Tami Carmeli =

Israeli lawn bowls player

Personal information
- Native name: תמי כרמלי
- National team: Israel
- Born: 19 December 1939

Sport
- Country: Israel
- Sport: Lawn bowls
Medal record
Event	1st	2nd	3rd
Paralympic Games	0	0	1
IBD/IBBA World Championships	0	5	4
Lawn bowls
Representing Israel
Paralympic Games
Bronze medal – third place	1996 Atlanta	Women's singles LB6
IBBA World Championships
Silver medal – second place	1993 Canada	Mixed Pairs B1
Bronze medal – third place	2001 Girvan	Mixed Pairs B1
Silver medal – second place	2005 Johannesburg	Mixed Pairs B1
IPC/IBD World Championships
Bronze medal – third place	1995 Aylesbury	Women's singles B1
Bronze medal – third place	1998 Germiston	Women's singles B1
Silver medal – second place	2002 Adelaide	Women's singles B1
Silver medal – second place	2002 Adelaide	Mixed Pairs B1
Silver medal – second place	2011 Pretoria	Mixed Pairs B1
Bronze medal – third place	2011 South Africa	Women's singles B1

Tami Carmeli (Hebrew: תמי כרמלי; born 1939) is an Israeli lawn bowls player.

== Career ==
Carmeli was a librarian in the Technion when she became blind in 1980. In 1988, she began playing lawn bowls.

Carmeli was the national champion in lawn bowls in classification B1 in the years 1991, 1999, 2001, 2002, 2005, 2008 and 2012.

Carmeli took part in the International Blind Bowls Association World Championships of 1993, 1997, 2001 and 2005, winning two silver medals (1993, 2005) and one bronze (2001) in the Mixed Pairs tournaments. She also competed in the world championships of the International Paralympic Committee in the years 1995, 1998 and 2002 and 2011 winning medals in both singles' tournaments and in the mixed pairs events.

At the 1996 Atlanta Paralympics, Carmeli won bronze in the lawn bowls women's singles LB6 event.

In the years 2000 and 2006 she was named "Athlete of the Year" by the Ministry of Culture and Sport.

Carmeli was the subject of a 1997 documentary directed by her son and titled Mom's First Olympics.
