= Michael Churm =

Medal record

Paralympic athletics

Representing United Kingdom

Paralympic Games
| Silver medal – second place | 2000 Sydney | 4x100 metre relay - T38 |

Michael Churm is a paralympic athlete from Great Britain competing mainly in category T37 sprint events.

Michael has competed in the sprint events at two Paralympics, firstly in 2000 Summer Paralympics where he competed in the T37 100m and then won a silver medal with his teammates in the T38 4 × 100 m relay. After missing the 2004 Paralympic Games due to injury that was sustained at the British Trials Michael continued and successfully gained selection for the Great Britain NI Team at the 2008 Paralympic Games in Beijing, China where he made both the T37 100m and 200m Finals.
