= Victoria Broadribb =

English Paralympic swimmer

Personal information
- Born: 12 June 1976 Walsall, England, Great Britain
- Height: 87 cm (2 ft 10 in)
- Weight: 3 st (42 lb; 19 kg)

Sport
- Country: United Kingdom
- Sport: Paralympic swimming
- Disability: Spondylo epiphyseam dysplasia
- Disability class: S2
- Event: Freestyle
Medal record
Paralympic swimming
Representing United Kingdom
Paralympic Games
Gold medal – first place	2000 Sydney	Women's 50m freestyle S2
Bronze medal – third place	1996 Atlanta	Women's 50m freestyle S2

Victoria "Vicky" Elaine Broadribb MBE (12 June 1976 - 2005) was an English Paralympic swimmer who competed for Great Britain at international level events.

Broadribb was born with a condition called spondyloepiphyseam dysplasia, it is a rare form of dyplasia which causes bone deformities and short stature.
