= Janice Lawton =

British Paralympic athlete

Medal record

Paralympic athletics

Representing United Kingdom

Paralympic Games
Silver medal – second place	1996 Atlanta	Shot Put - F32-33
Silver medal – second place	2000 Sydney	Discus Throw - F33-34

Janice Lawton is a Paralympic athlete from Great Britain competing mainly in category F33 shot put and discus events.

Janice Lawton competed in a World Record Sanctioned event in Nottingham 1993 and set three World Records in Shot Put, Discus throw and Javelin throw for F33/34. She competed in World Championships in Berlin 1994 winning Gold and World Record for Javelin Throw F34 and Silver for Shot Put and Discus throws in F34.

Janice has competed in two Paralympics and each time won a single silver medal. Her first games were in 1996 where she won a silver medal in her only event, the shot put. In the 2000 Summer Paralympics, she competed in shot put and discus, winning the silver medal in the latter.
