= Stephen Payton =

British Paralympic athlete

Personal information
- Born: 17 May 1977 (age 49) Uphall, Scotland
Medal record
Men's athletics
Representing United Kingdom
Paralympic Games
Gold medal – first place	1996 Atlanta	100 metres - T37
Gold medal – first place	1996 Atlanta	200 metres - T37
Gold medal – first place	1996 Atlanta	400 metres - T37
Silver medal – second place	2000 Sydney	400 metres - T38
Silver medal – second place	2000 Sydney	4x100m - T38
Bronze medal – third place	1996 Atlanta	4x100m - T34-37
Bronze medal – third place	2000 Sydney	100 metres - T38
Bronze medal – third place	2000 Sydney	200 metres - T38
Bronze medal – third place	2004 Athens	400 metres - T38

Stephen Payton (born 17 May 1977 in Uphall, Scotland) is a Paralympian athlete from Great Britain competing mainly in category T38 sprint events.

Payton has competed in four Paralympics, his first and most successful was in 1996 where he had a clean sweep of the T37 sprint events, winning gold in 100m,200m and 400m as well as winning a silver in the T34-37 4 × 100 m as part of the British team. Four years later in Sydney he was not as successful winning bronze medals in both the T38 100m and 200m and a silver in the 400m and being part of the British team that improved to silver in the T38 relay. By the Athens games Stephen was not part of the relay team but did still compete in the three individual sprint races but only managed a bronze in the 400m. In the 2008 Summer Paralympics he competed in the 200m and 400m but for the first time in four games did not win a single medal. He also competed at four IPC world championships in Berlin 1994 Birmingham UK 1998 Lillie 2002 and Assen 2006 . Winning 7 gold 2 silver and 1 bronze medals. He has held the European T38 400m record since 1994 (51:37 )

IPC European champ 200m 400m 2003 t38 classification
