= Maggie McEleny =

Scottish swimmer

Maggie McEleny MBE
Personal information
- Full name: Margaret McIntosh McEleny
- Born: 1965 (age 60–61)
Medal record
Swimming
Representing Great Britain
Paralympic Games
Gold medal – first place	1996 Atlanta	4×50 m freestyle S1–6
Gold medal – first place	2000 Sydney	50 m breaststroke SB3
Gold medal – first place	2004 Athens	4×50 m freestyle 20pts
Silver medal – second place	1992 Barcelona	100 m breaststroke SB3
Silver medal – second place	1996 Atlanta	50 m breaststroke SB3
Silver medal – second place	1996 Atlanta	150 m medley SM4
Silver medal – second place	2004 Athens	50 m breaststroke SB3
Silver medal – second place	2004 Athens	150 m indiv. medley SM4
Bronze medal – third place	1992 Barcelona	4×50 m medley S1–6
Bronze medal – third place	1996 Atlanta	50 m freestyle S5
Bronze medal – third place	1996 Atlanta	100 m freestyle S5
Bronze medal – third place	1996 Atlanta	200 m freestyle S5
Bronze medal – third place	1996 Atlanta	4×50 m medley S1–6
Bronze medal – third place	2000 Sydney	4×50 m medley 20 pts
Bronze medal – third place	2000 Sydney	150 m indiv. medley SM4

Margaret McIntosh McEleny MBE (born 1965), also known as "Mad Maggie" for her unshakable desire to compete, is a Scottish swimmer. She has paraplegia and epilepsy due to a head injury at age 11, which left her blind for a while. She competed in four Summer Paralympics from 1992 to 2004. In her career, McEleny has won three gold, five silver, and seven bronze medals at the Paralympics.

== Awards ==
McEleny was appointed Member of the Order of the British Empire (MBE) in the 2000 Birthday Honours for services to disabled swimming.

She was inducted into the Scottish Swimming Hall of Fame in 2018.

She was inducted into the Scottish Women in Sport Hall of Fame in 2018.
