= Caroline Baird =

British Paralympic athlete (born 1974)

Caroline Baird MBE
Personal information
- Born: Caroline Innes; 14 March 1974 (age 52) Cupar, Fife, Scotland

Sport
- Country: United Kingdom
- Sport: Track and field
- Event: Sprints
- Coached by: John Oulton
Medal record
Paralympic Games
Gold medal – first place	1992 Barcelona	Women's 100 m C5-6
Gold medal – first place	1996 Atlanta	Women's 100 m T34-35
Gold medal – first place	2000 Sydney	Women's 200 m T36
Gold medal – first place	2000 Sydney	Women's 400 m T36
Silver medal – second place	2000 Sydney	Women's 100 m T36
World Championships
Gold medal – first place	1998 Birmingham	Women's 200 m
Gold medal – first place	1998 Birmingham	Women's 400 m
Silver medal – second place	1990 Assen	Women's 100 m
Silver medal – second place	1990 Assen	Women's 200 m
Bronze medal – third place	1994 Berlin	Women's 100 m
Bronze medal – third place	1994 Berlin	Women's 200 m

Caroline Baird MBE (née Innes; born 14 March 1974) is a former athlete who represented Great Britain at three Paralympic Games. During her career she was recognised as the greatest sprinter in her class, winning four Paralympic gold medals along with two World Championships titles.

== Personal life ==
Baird was born in Cupar, Fife on 14 March 1974 and graduated from Dundee University. She has cerebral palsy and, after a highly successful career in athletics, retired from international sport to spend time with husband John and raise a family. The couple had two daughters, Christy and Connie. Baird was awarded an MBE in the New Years Honours in 2000/2001.

== Sporting career ==
Baird was a member of the Cupar and District Swimming Club and represented Scotland at the British Swimming Championships. She was encouraged to take up athletics and travelled to the 1989 World Games in Miami as a member of the Scottish Youth Team. Her potential was quickly recognised. The following year she won silver in both the 100m and 200m races at the World Championships in Assen.

Competing under her maiden name of Innes she attended her first Paralympic Games in 1992. and won gold in the 100m. She then competed in the World Championships in Berlin in 1994, winning bronze in both the 100m and 200m.

At the 1996 Games in Atlanta Baird retained her 100m gold. She achieved her greatest World Championship successes in Birmingham in 1998, winning gold in the 200m and 400m events.

Her greatest Paralympic results came two years later at the Games in Sydney. She won silver in the 100m and triumphed in the longer sprint distances, achieving gold medals in both the 200m and 400m events. Baird's time of 1 minute 16.65 seconds was a new world record, beating the previous time by nearly six seconds.

Baird is recognised as having been one of the leading sprinters in her class and was awarded the Young Disabled Sportswoman of the Year award in 1993. Though she is retired from international competition she still trains with coach John Oulton.
