= Tracy Wiscombe =

Scottish Paralympic swimmer (born 1979)

Personal information
- Born: 31 August 1979 (age 46) Fife, Scotland

Sport
- Country: United Kingdom
- Sport: Paralympic swimming
- Disability: Learning disability
- Disability class: S14, SM14
- Club: Burntisland Swimming Club
- Retired: 2002
Medal record
Paralympic swimming
Representing United Kingdom
Paralympic Games
Gold medal – first place	1996 Atlanta	Women's 50m freestyle MH
Gold medal – first place	1996 Atlanta	Women's 100m freestyle MH
Silver medal – second place	2000 Sydney	Women's 200m freestyle S14
Bronze medal – third place	2000 Sydney	Women's 50m freestyle S14
Bronze medal – third place	2000 Sydney	Women's 100m freestyle S14
World Championships
Gold medal – first place	1998 Christchurch	Women's 50m freestyle S14
Gold medal – first place	1998 Christchurch	Women's 100m freestyle S14
Gold medal – first place	1998 Christchurch	Women's 200m freestyle S14
Silver medal – second place	1998 Christchurch	Women's 4x50m medley relay S14
Silver medal – second place	1998 Christchurch	Women's 4x100m freestyle relay S14
Silver medal – second place	2002 Mar del Plata	Women's 100m butterfly S14
Silver medal – second place	2002 Mar del Plata	Women's 400m freestyle S14
Silver medal – second place	2002 Mar del Plata	Women's 200m individual medley SM14
Bronze medal – third place	2002 Mar del Plata	Women's 100m backstroke S14

Tracy Wiscombe (born 31 August 1979) is a retired Scottish Paralympic swimmer who competed for Great Britain at international level events. She was Scotland's most successful sportsperson with a learning disability.
