= Spain at the 1996 Summer Paralympics =

- IPC code: ESP
- NPC: Spanish Paralympic Committee
- Website: www.paralimpicos.es (in Spanish)

in Atlanta
- Competitors: 196 (146 men and 50 women)
- Medals Ranked 5th: Gold 39 Silver 31 Bronze 36 Total 106

Summer Paralympics appearances (overview)
- 1968; 1972; 1976; 1980; 1984; 1988; 1992; 1996; 2000; 2004; 2008; 2012; 2016; 2020; 2024

196 athletes (146 men and 50 women) from Spain competed at the 1996 Summer Paralympics in Atlanta, United States.

== Medallists ==
Medal	Name	Sport	Event
Gold	Júlio Requena	Athletics	Men's 100m T10
Gold	Juan António Prieto	Athletics	Men's 100m T11
Gold	Júlio Requena	Athletics	Men's 200m T10
Gold	José Antonio Sánchez	Athletics	Men's 800m T11
Gold	José Antonio Sánchez	Athletics	Men's 1500m T11
Gold	Javier Conde	Athletics	Men's 5000m T44-46
Gold	Javier Conde	Athletics	Men's marathon T42-46
Gold	Juan António Prieto; Jorge Núñez; Enrique Sánchez-Guijo; Júlio Requena	Athletics	Men's 4 × 100 m relay T10-12
Gold	Juan António Prieto; Sergio Sánchez; Enrique Sánchez-Guijo; José Antonio Sánchez	Athletics	Men's 4 × 400 m relay T10-12
Gold	José Manuel Rodríguez	Athletics	Men's long jump F10
Gold	Ruben Alvarez	Athletics	Men's long jump F45-46
Gold	José Manuel Rodríguez	Athletics	Men's triple jump F10
Gold	Juan Viedma	Athletics	Men's triple jump F11
Gold	Alfonso Fidalgo	Athletics	Men's discus F10
Gold	Alfonso Fidalgo	Athletics	Men's shot put F10
Gold	Purificacion Santamarta	Athletics	Women's 100m T10
Gold	Beatriz Mendoza	Athletics	Women's 100m T11
Gold	Purificacion Santamarta	Athletics	Women's 200m T10
Gold	Beatriz Mendoza	Athletics	Women's 200m T11
Gold	Purificacion Santamarta	Athletics	Women's 400m T10
Gold	Magdalena Amo	Athletics	Women's F10-11
Gold	Maria Rodriguez	Boccia	Mixed individual C2
Gold	Antonio Cid; Miguel Gomez; Jesus Fraile; Maria Rodriguez	Boccia	Mixed team C1-2
Gold	Miguel Perez	Cycling	Mixed omnium LC3
Gold	Francisco Angel Soriano	Shooting	Mixed free pistol .22 SH1
Gold	Ricardo Oribe	Swimming	Men's 50m freestyle S4
Gold	Juan Fuertes	Swimming	Men's 50m freestyle S5
Gold	Jésus Iglesias	Swimming	Men's 100m breaststroke SB6
Gold	Ricardo Oribe	Swimming	Men's 100m freestyle S4
Gold	Juan Fuertes	Swimming	Men's 100m freestyle S5
Gold	Javier Torres	Swimming	150m medley SM4
Gold	Ricardo Oribe	Swimming	Men's 200m freestyle S4
Gold	Enrique Tornero	Swimming	Men's 400m freestyle S9
Gold	Sara Carracelas	Swimming	Women's 50m backstroke S2
Gold	Aranzazu Gonzalez	Swimming	Women's 50m backstroke S3
Gold	Sara Carracelas	Swimming	Women's 50m freestyle S3
Gold	Aranzazu Gonzalez	Swimming	Women's 50m freestyle S3
Gold	Raquel Saavedra	Swimming	Women's 100m backstroke B1
Gold	Aranzazu Gonzalez	Swimming	Women's 100m freestyle S3
Silver	José Manuel Rodríguez	Athletics	Men's 100m T10
Silver	Fernando Gomez	Athletics	Men's 100m T35
Silver	Juan António Prieto	Athletics	Men's 200m T11
Silver	Fernando Gomez	Athletics	Men's 200m T34-35
Silver	Jose Luis Tovar	Athletics	Men's 400m T10
Silver	Sergio Sánchez	Athletics	Men's 400m T11
Silver	Fernando Gomez	Athletics	Men's 400m T34-35
Silver	José Saura	Athletics	Men's 800m T11
Silver	Cesar Carlavilla	Athletics	Men's 1500m T11
Silver	Joseba Larrinaga	Athletics	Men's marathon T42-46
Silver	Alejo Velez	Athletics	Men's high jump F10-11
Silver	Moises Esmeralda	Athletics	Men's long jump F11
Silver	Maria Alvarez	Athletics	Women's 100m T34-35
Silver	Maria Ortega	Athletics	Women's 400m T11
Silver	Rosalia Lazaro	Athletics	Women's long jump F10-11
Silver	Yolanda Martin	Boccia	Mixed individual C1 wad
Silver	Francisco José Lara; Belén Perez	Cycling	Mixed 60/70k tandem open
Silver	Francisco Boedo	Judo	Men's 86 kg
Silver	Pablo Corral	Swimming	Men's 50m freestyle B2
Silver	Francisco Segarra	Swimming	Men's 100m backstroke B2
Silver	José Arribas	Swimming	Men's 100m breaststroke B2
Silver	Ricardo Ten	Swimming	Men's 100m breaststroke SB4
Silver	Juan Fuertes	Swimming	Men's 200m freestyle S5
Silver	Francisco Segarra	Swimming	Men's 400m freestyle B2
Silver	Juan Fuertes; Ricardo Oribe; Jésus Iglesias; Javier Torres	Swimming	Men's 4x50m freestyle S1-6
Silver	Silvia Vives	Swimming	Women's 100m backstroke S8
Silver	Laura Tramuns Tripiana	Swimming	Women's 100m breaststroke SB8
Silver	Silvia Vives	Swimming	Women's 100m butterfly S8
Silver	Maria Angeles Fernandez	Swimming	Women's 100m freestyle B2
Silver	Mireia Riera	Swimming	Women's 100m freestyle S7
Silver	Maria Angeles Fernandez	Swimming	Women's 200m medley B2
Bronze	Jorge Núñez	Athletics	Men's 100m T11
Bronze	José Manuel González	Athletics	Men's 400m T37
Bronze	Pedro Delgado	Athletics	Men's 800m T10
Bronze	Ruben Delgado	Athletics	Men's 800m T11
Bronze	Francisco Perez	Athletics	Men's marathon T11
Bronze	Juan Viedma	Athletics	Men's long jump F11
Bronze	Ruben Alvarez	Athletics	Men's triple jump F45-46
Bronze	Francisco Jesus Mendez	Athletics	Men's discus F53
Bronze	Andres Martinez	Athletics	Men's shot put F10
Bronze	Juan Lebrero	Athletics	Men's shot put F41
Bronze	Raquel Diaz	Athletics	Women's 100m T10
Bronze	Alicia Martinez	Athletics	Women's 200m T34-37
Bronze	Purificacion Ortiz	Athletics	Women's long jump F10-11
Bronze	Jesus Fraile	Athletics	Mixed individual C2
Bronze	Rosa Corral; Maria Chaves	Cycling	Women's 50/60k tandem open
Bronze	José Santiago; Elena Padrones	Cycling	Mixed 60/70k tandem open
Bronze	Belén Perez; Francisco José Lara	Cycling	Mixed individual pursuit tandem open
Bronze	Julian Galilea; Borja Pardo; Juan Vazquez; Jesus Maria Visitacion; José Hurtado; Santiago Lopez; David Jimenez; Manuel Rufo; Aitzol Arzallus; Juan Taibo; Jorge Peleteiro	Football 7-a-side	Men's team
Bronze	Ricardo Fernandez; Fernando Sardina; Jordi Mendoza; Roberto Abenia; Francisco Munoz; Hipolito Gonzalez	Goalball	Men's team
Bronze	Eugenio Santana	Judo	Men's 78 kg
Bronze	Jesus Iglesias	Swimming	Men's 50m freestyle S7
Bronze	Ricardo Ten; Jésus Iglesias; Javier Torres; Juan Fuertes	Swimming	Men's 4x50m medley S1-6
Bronze	Pablo Saavedra; Enrique Tornero; Antonio Martorell; Juan Francisco Jimenez	Swimming	Men's 4 × 100 m freestyle S7-10
Bronze	Maria Angeles Fernandez	Swimming	Women's 50m freestyle B3
Bronze	Ana Garcia-Arcicollar	Swimming	Women's 100m backstroke B2
Bronze	Begona Lopez	Swimming	Women's 100m breaststroke SB9
Bronze	Ana Bernardo	Swimming	Women's 100m butterfly S10
Bronze	Sara Carracelas	Swimming	Women's 100m freestyle S2
Bronze	Ana Garcia-Arcicollar	Swimming	Women's 200m breaststroke B2
Bronze	Silvia Vives	Swimming	Women's 200m medley SM8
Bronze	Maria Angeles Fernandez	Swimming	Women's 400m freestyle B2
Bronze	Mireia Riera	Swimming	Women's 400m freestyle S7
Bronze	Maria Angeles Fernandez; Anais Garcia; Ana Garcia-Arcicollar; Raquel Saavedra	Swimming	Women's 4 × 100 m medley B1-3
Bronze	Silvia Vives; Begona Reina; Ana Bernardo; Tania Cerda	Swimming	Women's 4 × 100 m medley S7-10
Bronze	Enrique Agudo	Table tennis	Men's singles 10
Bronze	Francisca Bazalo; Cristina Perez; Gema Victoria Hassen Bey	Wheelchair fencing	Women's epée team

== Goalball ==
The Spanish men's goalball team consisted of Roberto Abenia, Ricardo Fernandez, Hipolito Gonzalez, Jordi Mendoza, Francisco Munoz and Fernando Sardina. They finished third in the final, winning the bronze medal.

The Spanish women's goalball team consisted of Vicenta Arenas, Mercedes Capa, Concepcion Hernandez, Sara Luna, Jessica Malagon and Begona Redal.

== See also ==
- Spain at the Paralympics
- Spain at the 1996 Summer Olympics
