= Spain at the 1992 Summer Paralympics =

- IPC code: ESP
- NPC: Spanish Paralympic Committee
- Website: www.paralimpicos.es (in Spanish)

in Barcelona
- Medals Ranked 4th: Gold 39 Silver 32 Bronze 49 Total 120

Summer Paralympics appearances (overview)
- 1968; 1972; 1976; 1980; 1984; 1988; 1992; 1996; 2000; 2004; 2008; 2012; 2016; 2020; 2024

In 1992, Spain had competitors in archery, wheelchair basketball, swimming, weightlifting, shooting, boccia, cycling, fencing, judo, tennis, 7-per-side football, table tennis and athletics.

Spain won 34 gold medal, 31 silver medals and 42 bronze medals. Spain finished fifth in total medals.

== Background ==
The Games were held in Barcelona. Competitors with spinal cord injuries, amputations, cerebral palsy, Les Autres and vision impairments were eligible to compete in these Games.

== Hosting ==
In 1992, the Games were held at home for Spain, with the Games being staged in Barcelona. 82 countries participated. These were the first Games to be broadcast live on television. The Games used the same venues as the Summer Olympics.

Organizers decided to not charge an admission fee to events in order to attempt to foster interest locally in disability sport. Domestically, there was very little interest in the Paralympic Games when compared to the Olympic Games.

== Intellectual disabilities ==
A separate competition was held in Madrid where competitors with intellectual disabilities competed that ran immediately following the completion of the 1992 Paralympics. The Games were sponsored by the Association Nacional Prestura de Servicio (ANDE) and sanctioned by the International Coordinating Committee of World Sport Organizations for the Disabled and the International Association of Sport for the Mentally Handicapped Spain led efforts to include competitors with intellectual disabilities into the Paralympic movement, creating an international federation for these competitors in 1986.

== Archery ==
1 of Spain's silver medals came in archery. It was won by an archer with a physical disability.

Event	Gold	Silver	Bronze
Men's teams open	South Korea (KOR); Hyun Kwan Cho; Sung Hee Kim; Hak Young Lee	Spain (ESP); Jose Luis Hermosin; Jose Fernandez; Antonio Rebollo	France (FRA); Jean-Michel Favre; Jean Francois Garcia; Rene Le Bras

== Athletics ==
22 of Spain's gold medals, 14 silver medals and 12 bronze medals came in athletics. 35 medals were won by athletes with vision impairments, 9 by athletes with physical disabilities and 4 by athletes with cerebral palsy.

Event	Gold	Silver	Bronze
100 m B1	Sergei Sevastianov; Unified Team		José Manuel Rodríguez; Spain
100 m B1	Júlio Requena; Spain		José Manuel Rodríguez; Spain
100 m B2	Marcelino Paz; Spain	Omar Turro; Cuba	Miroslaw Pych; Poland
200 m B1	Carlos Conceicao; Portugal	Julio Requena; Spain	Darren Collins; Australia
200 m B2	Marcelino Paz; Spain	Ingo Geffers; Germany	Omar Turro; Cuba
200 m C8	Frank Bruno; Canada	Hoon Son; South Korea	Jose Manuel González; Spain
400 m B2	Omar Turro; Cuba	Jose Antonio Sanchez; Spain	Ingo Geffers; Germany
400 m C8	Frank Bruno; Canada	Javier Salmerón; Spain	José Manuel González; Spain
800 m B2	Waldemar Kikolski; Poland	Jose Antonio Sanchez; Spain	Noel Thatcher; Great Britain
800 m TS4	Javier Conde; Spain	Patrice Gerges; France	Sergey Silchenco; Unified Team
1500 m B2	Noel Thatcher; Great Britain	Waldemar Kikolski; Poland	Jose Antonio Sanchez; Spain
1500 m TS4	Javier Conde; Spain	Sergey Silchenco; Unified Team	Yan Jian Wu; China
5000 m B2	Mariano Ruiz; Spain	Waldemar Kikolski; Poland	Michel Pavon; France
5000 m TS4	Javier Conde; Spain	Yan Jian Wu; China	Angel Marin; Spain
10000 m TS4	Javier Conde; Spain	Angel Marin; Spain	Sergey Silchenco; Unified Team
Marathon B2	Stephen Brunt; Great Britain	José Ortiz; Spain	Paul Collet; France
4 × 100 m relay B1–B3	Spain (ESP); Jorge Nunez; Marcelino Paz; Juan Antonio Prieto; Júlio Requena	Great Britain (GBR); Andrew Curtis; Robert Latham; Brinley Reynolds; Mark Whiteley	United States (USA); Andre Asbury; Brian Pegram; Chris Piper; Courtney Williams
4 × 100 m relay C5–8	United States (USA); Freeman Register; James Anderson; Gregory Taylor; Thomas Dietz	Spain (ESP); Javier Salmerón; Marcelino Saavedra; Julian Galilea; José Manuel González	Portugal (POR); Stos. Correia; Antonio Jose Silva; Jose Dias; Mario Santos
4 × 400 m relay B1–B3	Spain (ESP); Jose Antonio Sanchez; Sergio Sanchez; Juan Antonio Prieto; Enrique Sanchez	Great Britain (GBR); Simon Butler; Andrew Curtis; Noel Thatcher; Mark Whiteley	Italy (ITA); Vincenzo Ciacio; Claudio Costa; Sandro Filipozzi; Aldo Manganaro
High jump B2	Alejo Velez; Spain	Juan Carlos Prieto; Spain	Mohamad Khasseri Othman; Malaysia
High jump B2	Alejo Velez; Spain	Juan Carlos Prieto; Spain	Akihito Motohashi; Japan
Long jump B2	Wentao Huang; China	Juan Viedma; Spain	Koichi Takada; Japan
Long jump J4	Ruben Alvarez; Spain	Georgios Toptsis; Greece	Patrice Gerges; France
Triple jump B1	José Manuel Rodríguez; Spain	Sergei Sevastianov; Unified Team	Robert Latham; Great Britain
Triple jump B2	Juan Viedma; Spain	Aleksei Lashmanov; Unified Team	Wentao Huang; China
Triple jump J3–4	Shao Yang; China	Lin Qiu; China	Ruben Alvarez; Spain
Discus throw B1	Alfonso Fidalgo; Spain	Siegmund Turteltaube; Germany	Richard Ruffalo; United States
Javelin throw B1	Jorge Mendoza; Spain	Richard Ruffalo; United States	Mineho Ozaki; Japan
Shot put B1	Alfonso Fidalgo; Spain	Andres Martinez; Spain	James Mastro; United States
Pentathlon B1	Sergei Sevastianov; Unified Team	Vytautas Girnius; Lithuania	Jorge Mendoza; Spain
Pentathlon B2	Miroslaw Pych; Poland	Juan Antonio Prieto; Spain	Frantisek Godri; Czechoslovakia
Pentathlon PW3–4	Vojtech Vasicek; Czechoslovakia	Jose Abal; Spain	Kevin Saunders; United States
100 m B1	Purificacion Santamarta; Spain	Purificacion Ortiz; Spain	Tracey Hinton; Great Britain
100 m B2	Adria Santos; Brazil	Rima Batalova; Unified Team	Beatriz Mendoza; Spain
200 m B1	Purificacion Santamarta; Spain	Tracey Hinton; Great Britain	Purificacion Ortiz; Spain
200 m B2	Rima Batalova; Unified Team	Marsha Green; Australia	Beatriz Mendoza; Spain
400 m B1	Purificacion Santamarta; Spain	Tracey Hinton; Great Britain	Sigita Kriaučiūnienė; Lithuania
800 m B1	Purificacion Santamarta; Spain	Sigita Kriaučiūnienė; Lithuania	Pavla Valnickova; Czechoslovakia
1500 m B1	Pavla Valnickova; Czechoslovakia	Sigita Kriaučiūnienė; Lithuania	Mayte Espinosa; Spain
Long jump B1	Purificacion Ortiz; Spain	Anette Burger; Germany	Kerstin Gaedicke; Germany
Long jump B2	Raisa Zhuravleva; Unified Team	Magdalena Amo; Spain	Ana Lopez; Spain

== Boccia ==
2 of Spain's gold medals came in boccia. Both were won by players with cerebral palsy.

Event	Gold	Silver	Bronze
Mixed individual C1	Antonio Cid; Spain	James Thomson; United States	Henrik Jorgensen; Denmark
Mixed team C1–C2	Spain (ESP); Manuel Fernandez; Daniel Outeiro; Juan Tellechea; Antonio Cid	Denmark (DEN); Henrik Jorgensen; Mansoor Siddiqi; Lone Bak-Pedersen; Tove Jacobsen	Ireland (IRL); Martin McDonagh; Thomas Leahy; Jason Kearney; William Johnston

== Cycling ==
1 of Spain's gold medals and 3 bronze medals came in cycling. 2 medals were won by athletes with vision impairments, and 2 with physical disabilities.

Event	Gold	Silver	Bronze
Men's road race LC1	Francisco Trujillo; France	Wolfgang Eibeck; Austria	Jose Antonio Garcia; Spain
Men's road race LC3	Norbert Zettler; Austria	Pier Beltram; United States	Miguel Perez; Spain
Men's tandem open	Germany (GER); Hans-Jorg Furrer; Frank Hoefle	Netherlands (NED); Catharinus Beumer; Jan Mulder	Spain (ESP); Jose Santiago; Juan Carlos Molina
Mixed tandem open	Spain (ESP); Ignacio Rodriguez; Belen Perez	United States (USA); Elizabeth Heller; Gregory Evangelatos	Italy (ITA); Maria Erlacher; Klaus Fruet

== Goalball ==
The Spanish men's goalball team consisted of Roberto Abenia, Jose Camano, Jose Lopez, Francisco Munoz, Cristobal Palomares and Jose Sardina.

The Spanish women's goalball team consisted of Vicenta Arenas, Monica Augusto, Mercedes Capa, Ana Lancis, Sonia Lopez and Begona Redal.

== Judo ==
1 of Spain's gold medals, 1 silver medal came in athletics. Both were won by athletes with vision impairments.

Event	Gold	Silver	Bronze
Men's 65 kg	Juan Damian Matos; Spain	Shinichi Ishizue; Japan	Akhmed Gazimagomedov; Unified Team
Men's 65 kg	Juan Damian Matos; Spain	Shinichi Ishizue; Japan	Michael Murch; Great Britain
Men's 71 kg	Simon Jackson; Great Britain	Mario Talavera; Spain	Pier Morten; Canada
Men's 71 kg	Simon Jackson; Great Britain	Mario Talavera; Spain	Eiji Miyauchi; Japan

== Shooting ==
1 of Spain's silver medals came in shooting. It was won by a shooter with a physical disability.

Event	Gold	Silver	Bronze
Mixed sport pistol SH1–3	Jan Boonen; Belgium	Luis Salgado; Spain	Hubert Aufschnaiter; Austria

== Swimming ==
7 of Spain's gold medals, 14 silver medals and 22 bronze medals came in swimming. 9 medals were won by swimmers with vision impairments, 28 by swimmers with physical disabilities and 6 by swimmers with cerebral palsy.

Event	Gold	Silver	Bronze
50 m butterfly S5	Pascal Pinard; France	Thierry le Gloanic; France	Javier Torres; Spain
50 m butterfly S6	David Foppolo; France	Peter Lund; Denmark	Jesus Iglesias; Spain
50 m freestyle B2	Christopher Holmes; Great Britain	Pablo Corral; Spain	Kingsley Bugarin; Australia
50 m freestyle B2	Christopher Holmes; Great Britain	Pablo Corral; Spain	Fredrik Nasman; Sweden
50 m freestyle S3	Jean-Louis Flamengo; France	Jordi Pascual; Spain	Tommy Hunter; Great Britain
50 m freestyle S4	Pierre Bellot; France	Gene Viens; United States	Pau Marc Munoz; Spain
50 m freestyle S6	Peter Lund; Denmark	Jesus Iglesias; Spain	Kevin Sullivan; United States
100 m breaststroke B1	Christian Bundgaard; Denmark	John Morgan; United States	Jordi Mari; Spain
100 m breaststroke B2	Vitalii Krylov; Unified Team	Kingsley Bugarin; Australia	Jose Pedrajas; Spain
100 m breaststroke SB3	Bernd Eickemeyer; Germany	John Petersson; Denmark	Javier Torres; Spain
100 m breaststroke SB6	Matthias Schlubeck; Germany	Simon Ahlstad; Sweden	Juan Castane; Spain
100 m butterfly B1–2	John Morgan; United States	Tim Reddish; Great Britain	Pablo Corral; Spain
100 m freestyle B2	Christopher Holmes; Great Britain	Pablo Corral; Spain	Tim Reddish; Great Britain
100 m freestyle S3	Jean-Louis Flamengo; France	Tommy Hunter; Great Britain	Jordi Pascual; Spain
100 m freestyle S4	Pierre Bellot; France	Pau Marc Munoz; Spain	Stig Morten Sandvik; Norway
100 m freestyle S6	Peter Lund; Denmark	Kevin Sullivan; United States	Jesus Iglesias; Spain
150 m individual medley SM3	Jean-Louis Flamengo; France	Kenneth Cairns; Great Britain	Jordi Pascual; Spain
150 m individual medley SM4	Krzysztof Sleczka; Poland	Javier Torres; Spain	John Petersson; Denmark
200 m backstroke B2	Christopher Holmes; Great Britain	Juan Diego Gil; Spain	Ziv Better; Israel
200 m breaststroke B2	Vitalii Krylov; Unified Team	Kingsley Bugarin; Australia	Jose Pedrajas; Spain
200 m freestyle S6	Peter Lund; Denmark	Jeremy Gervan; Canada	Jesus Iglesias; Spain
200 m individual medley B2	Christopher Holmes; Great Britain	Kingsley Bugarin; Australia	Pablo Corral; Spain
200 m individual medley SM6	Eric Lindmann; France	Sebastian Xhrouet; Belgium	Roger Vial; Spain
400 m freestyle B2	Christopher Holmes; Great Britain	Ziv Better; Israel	Daniel Llambrich; Spain
4×50 m freestyle relay S1–6	Spain (ESP); Juan Fuertes; Javier Torres; Roger Vial; Jesus Iglesias	France (FRA); Pascal Pinard; Eric Lindmann; Thierry le Gloanic; David Foppolo	Great Britain (GBR); William McQueen; Mark Butler; Andrew Stubbs; Kevin Walsh
4×50 m medley relay S1–6	France (FRA); Thierry le Gloanic; Eric Lindmann; David Foppolo; Pascal Pinard	Spain (ESP); Juan Fuertes; Javier Torres; Juan Castane; Jesus Iglesias	United States (USA); Gary Bogue; Gregory Burns; Daniel Butler; Kevin Sullivan
50 m backstroke S2	Sonia Guirado; Spain	Mairead Berry; Ireland	Sandrine Serres; France
50 m backstroke S3–4	Arancha Gonzalez; Spain	M. Paz Montserrat; Spain	Susana Carvalheira; Portugal
50 m breaststroke SB2	Tara Flood; Great Britain	Regina Cachan; Spain	Frouwkje Harkema; Netherlands
50 m butterfly S3–4	Tracy Barrell; Australia	Regina Cachan; Spain	Jaenette Bouma; Netherlands
50 m freestyle S2	Liv Tone Lind; Norway	Sandrine Serres; France	Sonia Guirado; Spain
50 m freestyle S3–4	Arancha Gonzalez; Spain	M. Paz Montserrat; Spain	Tara Flood; Great Britain
100 m breaststroke SB4	Outi Hokkanen; Sweden	Jenny Newstead; New Zealand	Ana Martin; Spain
100 m breaststroke SB9	Begona Reina; Spain	Kristina Brokholc; Sweden	Beate Lobenstein; Germany
100 m butterfly S8	Laura Tramuns; Spain	Silvia Vives; Spain	Asa Wilhelmsson; Sweden
100 m butterfly S10	Claudia Hengst; Germany	Ana Bernardo; Spain	Judith Young; Australia
100 m freestyle S2	Liv Tone Lind; Norway	Sandrine Serres; France	Sonia Guirado; Spain
100 m freestyle S3–4	Arancha Gonzalez; Spain	Tara Flood; Great Britain	M. Paz Montserrat; Spain
400 m freestyle S10	Claudia Hengst; Germany	Sarah Bailey; Great Britain	Ana Bernardo; Spain

== Table tennis ==
3 of Spain's bronze medals came in table tennis. All medals were won by table tennis players with physical disabilities.

Event	Gold	Silver	Bronze
Open 6–10	Kimmo Jokinen; Finland	Michael Gerke; Germany	Gilles de la Bourdonnaye; France
Open 6–10	Kimmo Jokinen; Finland	Michael Gerke; Germany	Enrique Agudo; Spain
Singles 5	Kam Shing Kwong; Hong Kong	Guy Tisserant; France	So Boo Kim; South Korea
Singles 5	Kam Shing Kwong; Hong Kong	Guy Tisserant; France	Manuel Robles; Spain
Singles 10	Michael Gerke; Germany	Gilles de la Bourdonnaye; France	Thomas Goeller; Austria
Singles 10	Michael Gerke; Germany	Gilles de la Bourdonnaye; France	Enrique Agudo; Spain

== Wheelchair basketball ==
When Spain played the United States on the second day of competition, 12,500 people were in attendance. Organizers had to turn away 4,000 people who had wanted to attend. Philip Craven, future President of the International Paralympic Committee, played his first Paralympic Games wheelchair basketball at these games when he scored 30 points against the Spanish team.

== Wheelchair fencing ==
1 of Spain's gold medals and 2 bronze medals came in fencing. All were won by fencers with physical disabilities.

Event	Gold	Silver	Bronze
Épée 2	Esther Weber; Germany	Mariella Bertini; Italy	Gema Victoria Hassen Bey; Spain
Épée 3–4	Francisca Bazalo; Spain	Josette Bourgain; France	Laura Presutto; Italy
Team épée	Italy (ITA); Mariella Bertini; Rossana Giarrizzo; Laura Presutto; Deborah Taffoni	France (FRA); Josette Bourgain; Patricia Picot; Veronique Soetemondt	Spain (ESP); Francisca Bazalo; Gema Victoria Hassen Bey; Cristina Perez
