= Spain at the 2000 Summer Paralympics =

- IPC code: ESP
- NPC: Spanish Paralympic Committee
- Website: www.paralimpicos.es (in Spanish)

in Sydney
- Competitors: 210 (158 on foot, 52 on wheelchair)
- Medals Ranked 4th: Gold 38 Silver 30 Bronze 38 Total 106

Summer Paralympics appearances (overview)
- 1968; 1972; 1976; 1980; 1984; 1988; 1992; 1996; 2000; 2004; 2008; 2012; 2016; 2020; 2024

Spain competed at the 2000 Summer Paralympics in Sydney, Australia. The team included 210 athletes—158 on foot and 52 wheelchairs. Spanish competitors won 106 medals, 38 gold, 30 silver and 38 bronze, to finish 4th in the medal table.

== Medal table ==
Medal	Name	Sport	Event
Gold	José António Exposito	Athletics	Men's 100m T20
Gold	Enrique Sanchez-Guijo	Athletics	Men's 200m T11
Gold	Juan Lopez	Athletics	Men's 400m T20
Gold	Cesar Carlavilla	Athletics	Men's 800m T12
Gold	Ivan Hompanera	Athletics	Men's 800m T36
Gold	Cesar Carlavilla	Athletics	Men's 1500m T12
Gold	Ivan Hompanera	Athletics	Men's 5000m T38
Gold	Javier Conde	Athletics	Men's marathon T46
Gold	Alfonso Fidalgo	Athletics	Men's discus F11
Gold	José António Exposito	Athletics	Men's long jump F20
Gold	David Casinos	Athletics	Men's shot put F11
Gold	José Manuel Rodríguez	Athletics	Men's triple jump F11
Gold	Purificacion Santamarta	Athletics	Women's 400m T11
Gold	Rosalia Lazaro	Athletics	Women's long jump F12
Gold	Manuel Diaz; Oscar de la Cruz	Cycling	Men's tandem open
Gold	Hector Lopez	Swimming	Men's 50m backstroke S2
Gold	Miguel Luque	Swimming	Men's 50m breaststroke SB3
Gold	Daniel Vidal	Swimming	Men's 50m butterfly S6
Gold	Richard Oribe	Swimming	Men's 50m freestyle S4
Gold	Sebastián Rodríguez	Swimming	Men's 50m freestyle S5
Gold	Ricardo Ten	Swimming	Men's 100m breaststroke SB4
Gold	Jesús Collado Alarcón	Swimming	Men's 100m butterfly S9
Gold	Richard Oribe	Swimming	Men's 100m freestyle S4
Gold	Sebastián Rodríguez	Swimming	Men's 100m freestyle S5
Gold	Javier Torres	Swimming	Men's 150m individual medley SM4
Gold	Richard Oribe	Swimming	Men's 200m freestyle S4
Gold	Sebastián Rodríguez	Swimming	Men's 200m freestyle S5
Gold	Pablo Cimadevilla	Swimming	Men's 200m individual medley SM5
Gold	Enrique Floriano	Swimming	Men's 200m individual medley SM13
Gold	Jaime Serrano	Swimming	Men's 400m freestyle S9
Gold	Enrique Floriano	Swimming	Men's 400m freestyle S13
Gold	Richard Oribe; Daniel Vidal; Javier Torres; Sebastián Rodríguez	Swimming	Men's 4x50m relay 20 pts
Gold	Sebastián Rodríguez; Ricardo Ten; Javier Torres; Jordi Gordillo; Daniel Vidal; Vicente Gil; Pablo Cimadevilla	Swimming	Men's 4x50m medley relay 20 pts
Gold	Sara Carracelas	Swimming	Women's 50m backstroke S2
Gold	Deborah Font	Swimming	Women's 100m breaststroke SB12
Gold	Anais Garcia	Swimming	Women's 100m freestyle S11
Gold	Anais Garcia	Swimming	Women's 400m freestyle S11
Gold	Alvaro Valera	Table tennis	Men's singles 8
Silver	Juan Lopez	Athletics	Men's 100m T20
Silver	Luis Bullido	Athletics	Men's 400m T11
Silver	Abel Avila	Athletics	Men's 800m T12
Silver	Javier Conde	Athletics	Men's 5000m T46
Silver	Santiago Sanz	Athletics	Men's 5000m T52
Silver	Cesar Carlavilla; Pedro Delgado; Luis Bullido; Ignacio Avila	Athletics	Men's 4 × 400 m relay T13
Silver	José Fernandez; David Barrallo; Juan Martinez; Marcos Francisco Duenas	Athletics	Men's 4 × 400 m relay T46
Silver	José Manuel Rodríguez	Athletics	Men's long jump F11
Silver	Alfonso Fidalgo	Athletics	Men's shot put F11
Silver	Íñigo García	Athletics	Men's shot put F12
Silver	Purificacion Santamarta	Athletics	Women's 100m T12
Silver	Beatriz Mendoza	Athletics	Women's 200m T12
Silver	Antonio Cid	Boccia	Mixed individual BC1
Silver	Yolanda Martin; Santiago Pesquera	Boccia	Mixed pairs BC3
Silver	Jesus Fraile; Alvaro Galan; Francisco Beltran; Antonio Cid	Boccia	Mixed team BC1-BC2
Silver	José Andres Blanco Sánchez	Cycling	Mixed individual pursuit LC3
Silver	Abelardo Gandia; Jose Munoz	Cycling	Men's individual pursuit tandem open
Silver	Sara Luna; Maria Angeles Calderon; Concepcion Dueso; Concepcion Hernandez; Jessica Malagon; Begona Redal	Goalball	Women's team
Silver	David García	Judo	Men's -66 kg
Silver	Rafael Moreno	Judo	Men's +100 kg
Silver	Daniel Vidal	Swimming	Men's 50m freestyle S6
Silver	Enrique Floriano	Swimming	Men's 100m backstroke S13
Silver	Jaime Serrano	Swimming	Men's 200m individual medley SM9
Silver	Juan Francisco Jimenez	Swimming	Men's 400m freestyle S8
Silver	Enrique Tornero	Swimming	Men's 400m freestyle S9
Silver	Yolanda Jurado	Swimming	Women's 50m breaststroke SB14
Silver	Teresa Perales	Swimming	Women's 50m butterfly
Silver	Sara Carracelas	Swimming	Women's 100m freestyle S2
Silver	Ana Garcia-Arcicollar	Swimming	Women's 400m freestyle S12
Silver	Jose Manuel Ruiz	Table tennis	Men's singles 10
Bronze	Júlio Requena	Athletics	Men's 200m T11
Bronze	José Fernandez	Athletics	Men's 800m T46
Bronze	Santiago Sanz	Athletics	Men's 800m T52
Bronze	Pedro Delgado	Athletics	Men's 1500m T11
Bronze	Oscar Serrano	Athletics	Men's 1500m T12
Bronze	Jesús González	Athletics	Men's 1500m T36
Bronze	Juan António Prieto; Enrique Sanchez-Guijo; Juan Viedma; Júlio Requena	Athletics	Men's 4 × 100 m relay T13
Bronze	Francisco Jesus Mendez	Athletics	Men's shot put F54
Bronze	Ruben Alvarez	Athletics	Men's triple jump F46
Bronze	Beatriz Mendoza	Athletics	Women's 100m T12
Bronze	Susana Echeverria	Athletics	Women's javelin F20
Bronze	Francisco Beltran	Boccia	Mixed individual BC1
Bronze	Jesus Fraile	Boccia	Mixed individual BC2
Bronze	José Andres Blanco Sánchez	Cycling	Mixed bicycle road race LC3
Bronze	Francisco Suarez; Jose Curieses	Cycling	Men's tandem open
Bronze	Christian Venge; Jordi Domingo	Cycling	Men's individual pursuit tandem open
Bronze	José Carlos Ruiz	Judo	Men's -60 kg
Bronze	Francisco Angel Soriano	Shooting	Mixed free pistol SH1
Bronze	Javier Torres	Swimming	Men's 50m breaststroke SB3
Bronze	Jesús Collado Alarcón	Swimming	Men's 100m backstroke S9
Bronze	Miguel Deniz	Swimming	Men's 100m backstroke S11
Bronze	Francisco Segarra	Swimming	Men's 100m backstroke S12
Bronze	Juan Francisco Jimenez	Swimming	Men's 100m freestyle S8
Bronze	Samuel Soler	Swimming	Men's 200m freestyle S3
Bronze	Jesús Collado Alarcón	Swimming	Men's 200m individual medley SM9
Bronze	Francisco Segarra; Luis Arevalo; Enrique Floriano; Miguel Deniz	Swimming	Men's 4 × 100 m medley relay S11-13
Bronze	Sara Carracelas	Swimming	Women's 50m freestyle S2
Bronze	Teresa Perales	Swimming	Women's 50m freestyle S5
Bronze	Raquel Saavedra	Swimming	Women's 100m backstroke S11
Bronze	Ana Garcia-Arcicollar	Swimming	Women's 100m butterfly S12
Bronze	Teresa Perales	Swimming	Women's 100m freestyle S5
Bronze	Teresa Perales	Swimming	Women's 200m freestyle S5
Bronze	Deborah Font	Swimming	Women's 400m freestyle S12
Bronze	Manuel Robles	Table tennis	Men's singles 5
Bronze	Angel Garrido	Table tennis	Men's singles 11
Bronze	Enrique Agudo; Jose Manuel Ruiz	Table tennis	Men's teams 10
Bronze	Daniel Lamata	Wheelchair fencing	Men's épée individual B

== Basketball ID ==
Spain's intellectual disability basketball team won the tournament and gold medals, but these medals were soon stripped from the team. Shortly after the Games closed, Carlos Ribagorda, a member of the victorious team and an undercover journalist, revealed to the Spanish business magazine Capital that ten of the twelve members of the team were "ringers", that is, basketball players who were not disabled recruited to make the team stronger. None of these members underwent tests to verify they were actually disabled, nor would they have qualified had the tests been performed.

== Goalball ==
The Spanish men's goalball team consisted of Roberto Abenia, Ricardo Fernandez, Vicente Galiana, Raul Garcia, Hipolito Gonzalez and Manuel Panadero.

The Spanish women's goalball team consisted of Maria Angeles Calderon, Concepcion Dueso, Concepcion Hernandez, Sara Luna, Jessica Malagon and Begona Redal. They finished second in the final, winning the silver medal.

== See also ==
- Spain at the Paralympics
- Spain at the 2000 Summer Olympics
- Cheating at the Paralympic Games
