= Athletics at the 1992 Summer Paralympics – Men's 100 metres B2 =

Men's 100 metres B2 at the IX Paralympic Games
- Paralympic Athletics
- Competitors: 25 from 18 nations

Medalists
1st place, gold medalist(s)		Marcelino Paz	Spain
2nd place, silver medalist(s)		Omar Turro	Cuba
3rd place, bronze medalist(s)		Miroslaw Pych	Poland

The Men's 100 metres B2 was a track event in athletics at the 1992 Summer Paralympics, for visually impaired athletes. It consisted of five heats, two semi-finals and a final.

== Results ==
=== First round ===
==== Heat 1 ====
Place	Athlete	Time
1	Kouichi Takada (JPN)	12:13
2	Andrei Makarov (EUN)	12:57
3	Edward Holicky (AUS)	12:65
4	Chris Piper (USA)	12:67
-	Ingo Geffers (GER)	DNS

==== Heat 2 ====
Place	Athlete	Time
1	Marcelino Paz (ESP)	11:56
2	Andre Asbury (USA)	11:80
3	Miroslaw Pych (POL)	11:84
4	Peter Wallin (SWE)	11:86
5	Vincenzo Ciacio (ITA)	12:47

==== Heat 3 ====
Place	Athlete	Time
1	Omar Turro (CUB)	11:76
2	František Gödri (TCH)	12:02
3	Barack Ochieng (KEN)	12:03
4	Juan Viedma (ESP)	12:10
5	Khaled Darraj (BRN)	13:19

==== Heat 4 ====
Place	Athlete	Time
1	Holger Geffers (GER)	11:68
2	Jorge Núñez (ESP)	11:82
3	Mohamad Othman (MAS)	11:97
4	Peter Githu (KEN)	13:08
5	Miguel Cibelli (ARG)	13:16

==== Heat 5 ====
Place	Athlete	Time
1	Kurt Prall (AUT)	11:88
2	Mark Davies (AUS)	11:99
3	Mark Whiteley (GBR)	12:23
4	Corey Watson (USA)	12:55
5	Cristian Petersen (CRC)	13:20

=== Semi-final ===
==== Heat 1 ====
Place	Athlete	Time
1	Holger Geffers (GER)	11:65
2	Omar Turro (CUB)	11:68
3	Jorge Núñez (ESP)	11:81
4	Andre Asbury (USA)	11:82
5	Mohamad Khasseri Othman (MAS)	11:99

==== Heat 2 ====
Place	Athlete	Time
1	Marcelino Paz (ESP)	11:37
2	Miroslaw Pych (POL)	11:70
3	Peter Wallin (SWE)	11:79
4	Kurt Prall (AUT)	11:82
5	Kouichi Takada (JPN)	11:79

=== Final ===
Place	Athlete	Time
1	Marcelino Paz (ESP)	11:26
2	Omar Turro (CUB)	11:63
3	Miroslaw Pych (POL)	11:66
4	Peter Wallin (SWE)	11:79
5	Holger Geffers (GER)	12:30
