= Athletics at the 1992 Summer Paralympics – Men's discus throw B1 =

Men's high jump J2 at the IX Paralympic Games
- Paralympic Athletics
- Venue: Estadi Olímpic de Montjuïc
- Dates: September 1992
- Competitors: 12 from 9 nations

Medalists
1st place, gold medalist(s)		Alfonso Fidalgo	Spain
2nd place, silver medalist(s)		Siegmund Turteltaube	Germany
3rd place, bronze medalist(s)		Richard Ruffalo	United States

The Men's discus throw B1 was a field event in athletics at the 1992 Summer Paralympics, for visually impaired athletes.

== Results ==
=== Final ===
Place	Athlete	Width
1	Alfonso Fidalgo (ESP)	35.02
2	Siegmund Turteltaube (GER)	35.02
3	Richard Ruffalo (USA)	31.58
4	William Bardo (USA)	31.28
5	Andrés Martínez (ESP)	31.28
6	Sheng Chow Lee (MAS)	30.72
7	James Mastro (USA)	30.28
8	Bela Hegedus (HUN)	28.32
9	Pekka Kujala (FIN)	27.86
10	Luis Garcia (VEN)	23.72
-	Miroslav Jancic (IPP)	DNS
-	Khalid Mehmood (PAK)	NM
