= Athletics at the 2000 Summer Paralympics – Men's 100 metres T20 =

Men's 100 metres T20 at the XI Paralympic Games
- Venue: Stadium Australia
- Competitors: 19 from 12 nations
- Winning time: 10.85

Medalists
1st place, gold medalist(s)		José Antonio Exposito	Spain
2nd place, silver medalist(s)		Juan Lopez	Spain
3rd place, bronze medalist(s)		Andrew Newell	Australia

The men's 100 metres T20 took place at the Stadium Australia.

The T20 category is for athletes who have an intellectual disability such as autism. The race consisted of three heats and the seven fastest runners competed in the final.

== Results ==
=== Heat 1 ===
Qualified for final round

Rank	Athlete	Time	Notes
1	José Antonio Exposito (ESP)	11.00	
2	Nigel Bourne (GBR)	11.27	
3	Dean Turner (AUS)	11.48	
4	Lenine Cunha (POR)	11.49	
5	Johannes Nkosi (RSA)	11.62	
6	Sergei Dikun (EST)	12.01	

=== Heat 2 ===
Rank	Athlete	Time	Notes
1	Juan Lopez (ESP)	10.93	
2	Andrew Newell (AUS)	11.08	
3	Sandor Ponyori (HUN)	11.11	
4	Hitoshi Miyakawa (JPN)	11.29	
5	Tomasz Smokowski (POL)	11.33	
6	Thembisile Ngcwangu (RSA)	11.35	
7	Chan Fu Sang (HKG)	11.36	

=== Heat 3 ===
Rank	Athlete	Time	Notes
1	Wissam Ben Bahri (TUN)	11.31	
2	Silvino Veiga (POR)	11.42	
3	Sandro Alex Santos (BRA)	11.73	
4	Clifford Khanye (RSA)	11.78	
	Taysir Al Wahal (KSA)	DNF	
	Allan Stuart (GBR)	DNS	

=== Final ===
Rank	Athlete	Time	Notes
1st place, gold medalist(s)	José Antonio Exposito (ESP)	10.85	
2nd place, silver medalist(s)	Juan Lopez (ESP)	10.92	
3rd place, bronze medalist(s)	Andrew Newell (AUS)	11.11	
4	Sandor Ponyori (HUN)	11.17	
5	Nigel Bourne (GBR)	11.20	
6	Wissam Ben Bahri (TUN)	11.26	
7	Silvino Veiga (POR)	11.34	
8	Hitoshi Miyakawa (JPN)	11.39	
