= María Ortega =

María Ortega may refer to:

- María Vanesa Ortega Godoy (born 1981), Spanish Paralympic athlete
- María Ortega Gálvez (born 1967), Spanish artist
