= Jose Sanchez =

Jose Sanchez may refer to:

== Sportspeople ==
=== Association football ===
- Tente Sánchez (José Vicente Sánchez, born 1956), Spanish footballer
- José Luis Sánchez (Argentine footballer) (1974–2006), Argentine football midfielder
- José Enrique (footballer, born 1986) (José Enrique Sánchez), Spanish footballer
- José Sánchez (footballer, born 1987), Costa Rican footballer
- José Sánchez (footballer, born 1996), Mexican football forward
- José Arturo Sánchez (born 1996), Dominican footballer
- Pepe Sánchez (footballer) (José Sánchez Martínez, born 2000), Spanish footballer
- José Sánchez (footballer, born 2003), Peruvian footballer

=== Other sports ===
- José Domingo Sánchez (1911–?), Colombian Olympic sprinter
- José Sánchez (cyclist) (born 1941), Costa Rican Olympic cyclist
- José Luis Sánchez Paraíso (1942–2017), Spanish sprinter
- José Alberto Sánchez (born 1986), Cuban steeplechase athlete
- José Luis Sánchez (sport shooter) (born 1987), Mexican sport shooter
- José Antonio Sánchez, Paralympic athlete from Spain

== Others ==
- José Bernardo Sánchez (1778–1833), Spanish missionary
- José de la Cruz Sánchez (1799–1878), the Alcalde of San Francisco, California
- Jose "Fubar" Sanchez, Canadian video game journalist for Reviews on the Run and EP Daily
- José Hernán Sánchez Porras (1944–2014), Venezuelan Roman Catholic bishop
- José León Sánchez (1929–2022), Costa Rican novelist
- José Luis García Sánchez (born 1941), Spanish film director and screenwriter
- Jose Tomas Sanchez (1920–2012), Cardinal Prefect Emeritus of the Philippines
- José María Sánchez Martínez (born 1983), Spanish economist
- José Sánchez Lagomarsino, captain of the Peruvian Navy
- José Sánchez Marco, Spanish politician
- José Sánchez Peñate, founder of José Sánchez Peñate, corporation in the Canary Islands, Spain
- José Sánchez Rosa, Andalusian anarchist

== See also ==
- Pepe Sánchez (disambiguation)
- Joe Sanchez, former police officer and author
