= Abenia =

Abenia is a surname. Notable people with the surname include:

- Adriana Abenia (born 1984), Spanish television presenter, model, and actress
- Roberto Abenia (born 1972), Spanish goalball player
