= Francisco Muñoz =

Francisco Muñoz may refer to:

- Xisco Muñoz (born 1980), Spanish footballer
- Francisco Muñoz Sánchez (born 1972), Spanish goalball player
- Francisco Muñoz (cyclist) (born 2001), Spanish cyclist
