= Jaime Serrano =

Jaime Serrano may refer to

- Jaime Serrano Alonso (born 1979), Spanish S9 paralympic swimmer
- Jaime Serrano Cedillo (1967–2012), murdered Mexican politician
- Jaime Serrano Rueda (1927–1991), Colombian politician, governor of Santander, inspector-general
