= Athletics at the 1992 Summer Paralympics – Men's marathon B2 =

Men's marathon B2 at the IX Paralympic Games
- Paralympic Athletics
- Dates: 13 September
- Competitors: 12 from 9 nations

Medalists
1st place, gold medalist(s)		Stephen Brunt	Great Britain
2nd place, silver medalist(s)		José Ortiz	Spain
3rd place, bronze medalist(s)		Paul Collet	France

The Men's marathon B2 was a marathon event in athletics at the 1992 Summer Paralympics, for visually impaired athletes. British champion from the 1988 Games Stephen Brunt successfully defended his title in a time of 2:45:10, ten seconds slower from his previous winning time. Of the twelve starters, ten reached the finish line.

== Results ==
Place	Athlete	Time
1	Stephen Brunt (GBR)	2:45:10
2	Jose Ortiz (ESP)	2:45:39
3	Paul Collet (FRA)	2:47:23
4	Fiorenzo Pizzati (ITA)	2:56:29
5	Yasuyuki Mishima (JPN)	2:56:57
6	Fabian Pasiecznik (ARG)	3:04:23
7	Michael Barker (GBR)	3:07:09
8	Akihito Motohashi (JPN)	3:15:19
9	José Martins (POR)	3:18:33
10	Arne Olav Loevik (NOR)	3:19:29
-	Chris Beekmans (NED)	dnf
-	Michel Pavon (FRA)	dnf

== See also ==
- Marathon at the Paralympics
