= Ana Bernardo =

Ana Bernardo may refer to:

- Ana Bernardo (swimmer)
- Ana Bernardo (politician)
