= Athletics at the 1996 Summer Paralympics – Men's marathon T11 =

Men's marathon T11 at the X Paralympic Games
- Paralympic Athletics
- Dates: 25 August
- Competitors: 11 from 8 nations

Medalists
1st place, gold medalist(s)		Waldemar Kikolski	Poland
2nd place, silver medalist(s)		Tomasz Chmurzynski	Poland
3rd place, bronze medalist(s)		Francisco Pérez	Spain

The Men's marathon T11 was a marathon event in athletics at the 1996 Summer Paralympics, for visually impaired athletes. Waldemar Kikolski and Tomasz Chmurzynski finished in gold and silver medal positions respectively for Poland, ensuring that Kikolski won his first marathon title. Of the eleven starters, ten reached the finish line.

== Results ==
Place	Athlete	Time
1	Waldemar Kikolski (POL)	2:34:57
2	Tomasz Chmurzynski (POL)	2:42:01
3	Francisco Pérez (ESP)	2:44:24
4	Paul Collet (FRA)	2:47:19
5	Juan Menor (ESP)	2:48:29
6	Akihito Motohashi (JPN)	2:53:14
7	Francisco Gordillo (ESP)	2:55:38
8	Peter Wuenstel (GER)	3:03:05
9	Stephen Brunt (GBR)	3:05:50
10	Sandro Filipozzi (ITA)	3:10:49
-	Joe Quintanilla (USA)	DNF

== See also ==
- Marathon at the Paralympics
