= Jesús Iglesias =

Jesús Iglesias may refer to:

- Jesús Iglesias (racing driver) (1922-2005), Argentine racing driver
- Jesús Iglesias (swimmer) (born 1968), Spanish swimmer
