= Athletics at the 1996 Summer Paralympics – Men's marathon T42–46 =

Men's marathon T42-46 at the X Paralympic Games
- Paralympic Athletics
- Dates: 25 August
- Competitors: 9 from 6 nations

Medalists
1st place, gold medalist(s)		Javier Conde	Spain
2nd place, silver medalist(s)		Joseba Larrinaga	Spain
3rd place, bronze medalist(s)		Mark Brown	Great Britain

The Men's marathon T42-46 was a marathon event in athletics at the 1996 Summer Paralympics, for amputee athletes. Javier Conde and Joseba Larrinaga finished in gold and silver medal positions respectively for Spain, ensuring that Conde won his first marathon title, also setting a world Record. Of the nine starters, seven reached the finish line.

== Results ==
Place	Athlete	Time
1	Javier Conde (ESP)	2:31:15
2	Joseba Larrinaga (ESP)	2:43:23
3	Mark Brown (GBR)	2:55:33
4	Aleksandr Antofii (AZE)	3:01:44
5	Hermann Stopperich (GER)	3:03:05
6	Juan Hernandez (ESP)	3:08:47
7	A. Tchoulakov (MDA)	3:09:20
-	Madani Mardi (MAR)	dnf
-	El Kbir Mesned (MAR)	dnf

== See also ==
- Marathon at the Paralympics
