= Goalball at the 1996 Summer Paralympics =

Goalball at the X Paralympic Games
- Paralympic Goalball
- Dates: 17-23 August 1996

Paralympic symbol (1994-2004)

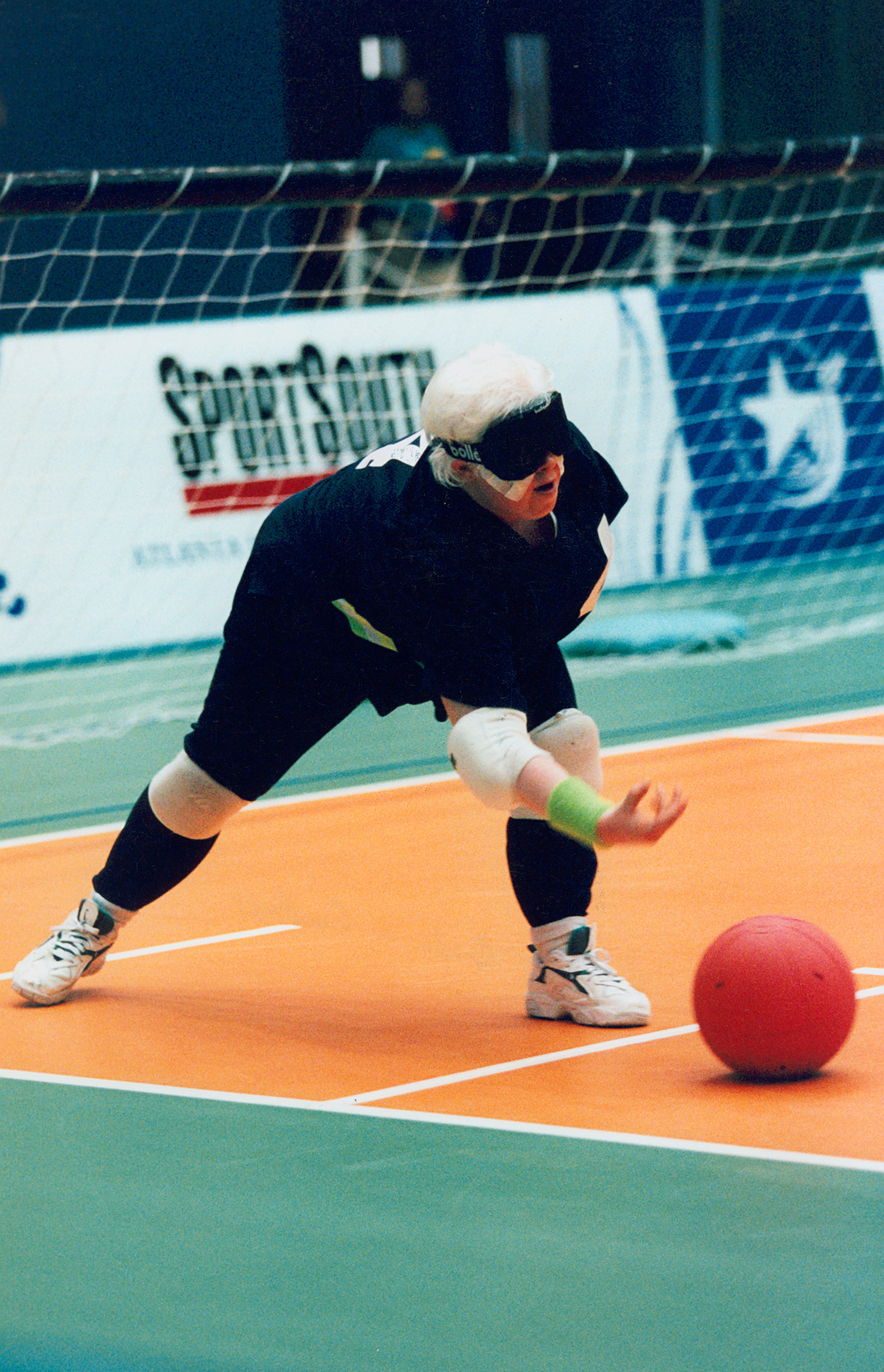
Australian goalballer Raelene Bock

Goalball at the 1996 Summer Paralympics consisted of men's and women's team events.

== Medal summary ==
Event	Gold	Silver	Bronze
Men	Finland (FIN) Juha Oikarainen; Arttu Makinen; Jani Kallunki; Jorma Kivinen; Asko Kinnunen; Marko Kauppila	Canada (CAN) Eric Houle; J. Crepault; Mario Caron; Jeff Christy; Roberto Gaunt; Dean Kozak	Spain (ESP) Ricardo Fernández; Fernando Sardina; Jordi Mendoza; Roberto Abenia; Francisco Munoz; Hipolito Gonzalez
Women	Germany (GER) Martina Bethke; Cornelia Dietz; Gudula Demmelhuber; Edda Ewert; Christel Bettinger; Christine Krause	Finland (FIN) Maria-Terttu Piiroinen; Iiris Keitel; Mari Pekkala; Tarja Pelkonen; Merja Hanski	United States (USA) Jennifer Armbruster; Maureen Esposito; Margaret Ostrowski; Sheryl Gordon; Patti Egensteiner-Asbury; Irene Davis-Sparks

== Men's tournament ==
=== Group A ===
Team	Pld	W	D	L	GF	GA	GD	Pts	Qualification
Canada (CAN)	5	4	0	1	26	13	+13	12	Second round
Finland (FIN)	5	3	0	2	22	13	+9	9	Second round
Spain (ESP)	5	3	0	2	20	13	+7	9	Second round
Hungary (HUN)	5	2	0	3	11	7	+4	6	
Great Britain (GBR)	5	1	1	3	10	19	-9	4	
United States (USA) (H)	5	1	1	3	7	31	-24	4	

=== Group B ===
Team	Pld	W	D	L	GA	GF	GD	Pts	Qualification
Australia (AUS)	5	3	2	0	22	11	+11	11	Second round
Italy (ITA)	5	2	1	2	20	18	+2	7	Second round
Netherlands (NED)	5	2	0	3	14	11	+3	6	Second round
Slovenia (SLO)	5	1	3	1	15	13	+2	6	
Germany (GER)	5	1	1	3	19	13	+6	4	
Czech Republic (CZE)	5	0	1	4	8	25	-17	1	

== Pictures ==
Goalball at the Paralympics
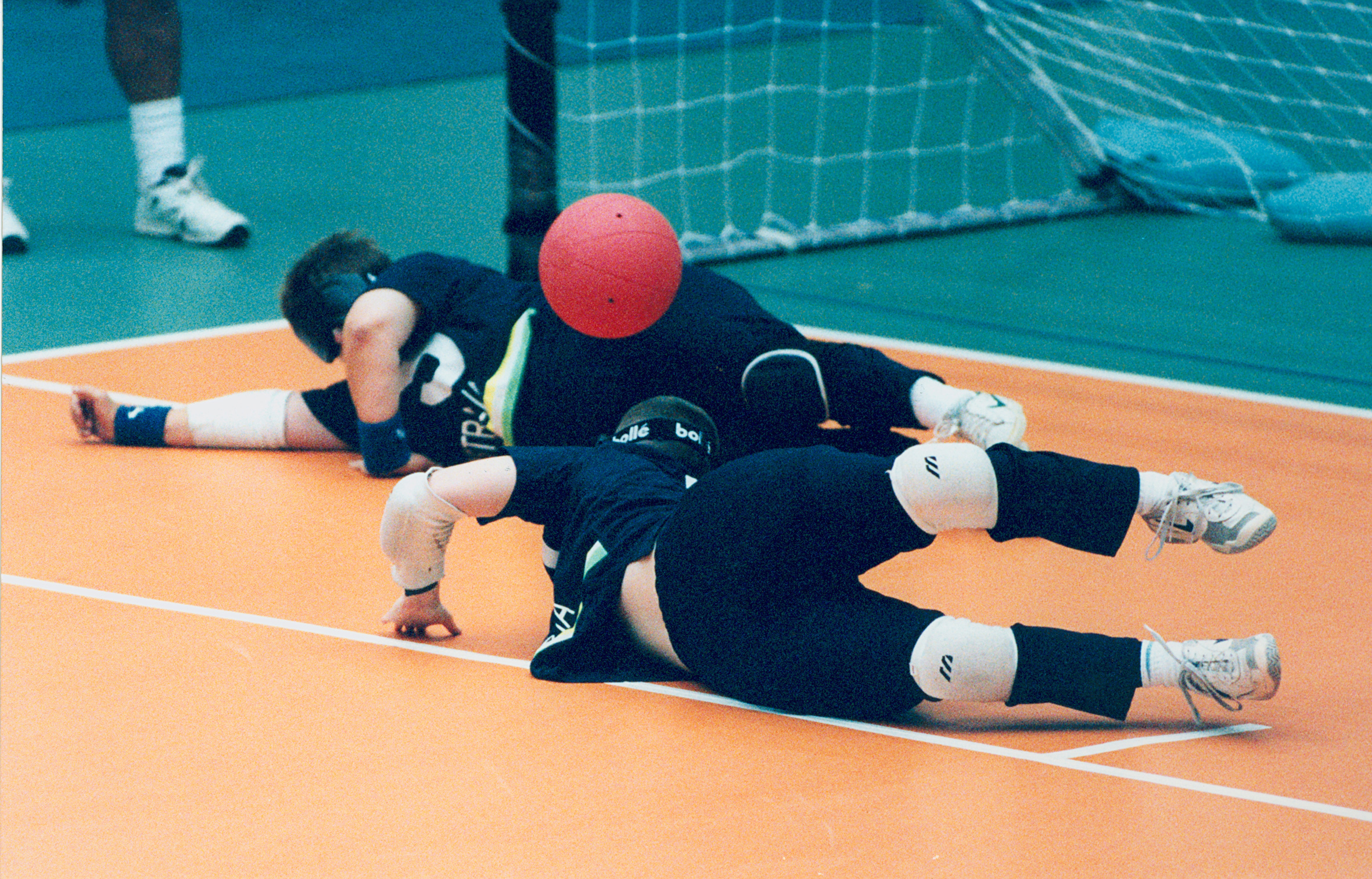
Goalballer Sarah Kennedy makes a save for Australia at the 1996 Atlanta Paralympic Games

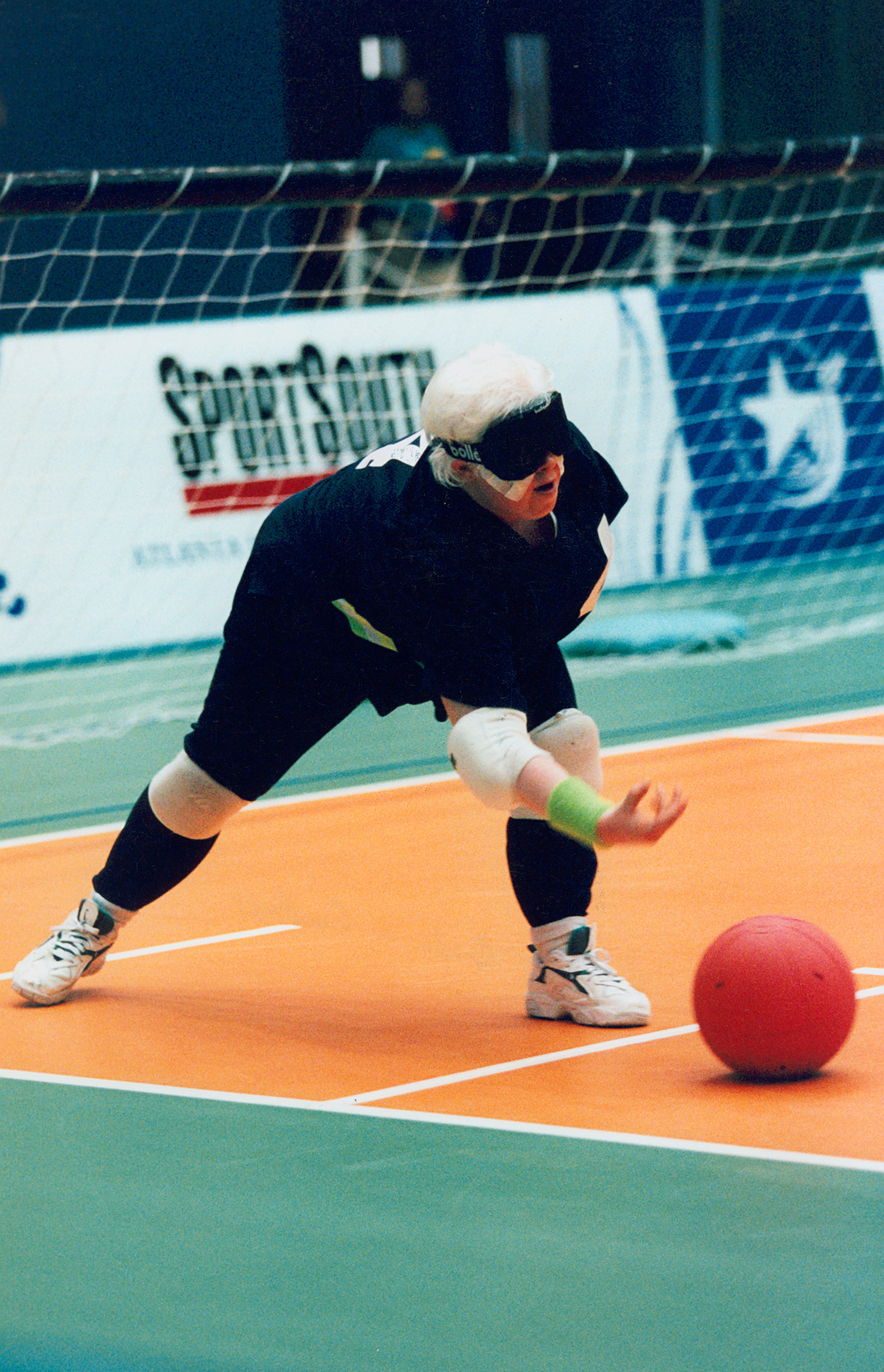
Goalballer Raelene Bock competes for Australia at the 1996 Summer Paralympics
