= Vicenta Arenas Mayor =

Spanish goalball player (born 1975)

Vicenta Arenas
Personal information
- Full name: Vicenta Arenas Mayor
- Born: 26 January 1975 (age 50); Gandia, Spain

Sport
- Country: Spain
- Sport: Women's Goalball

Vicenta Arenas Mayor (Note: In this Spanish name, the first or paternal surname is Arenas and the second or maternal family name is Mayor.) (born 26 January 1975) is a retired Spanish goalball player who competed in international level events. She competed for Spain at the 1992 Summer Paralympics and the 1996 Summer Paralympics.
