= Juan López (parathlete) =

Spanish Paralympic athlete

Medal record

Paralympic athletics

Representing Spain

Paralympic Games
Gold medal – first place	2000 Sydney	400 metres - T20
Silver medal – second place	2000 Sydney	100 metres - T20

Juan Lopez is a Spanish paralympic athlete who mainly competes in T20 sprint events.

Juan competed at the 2000 Summer Paralympics in Sydney, Australia. He competed in the high jump and long jump and won a silver medal in the T20 100m behind compatriot José António Exposito and won the T20 400m gold medal.
