= Andrew Newell (athlete) =

Australian paralympic athlete

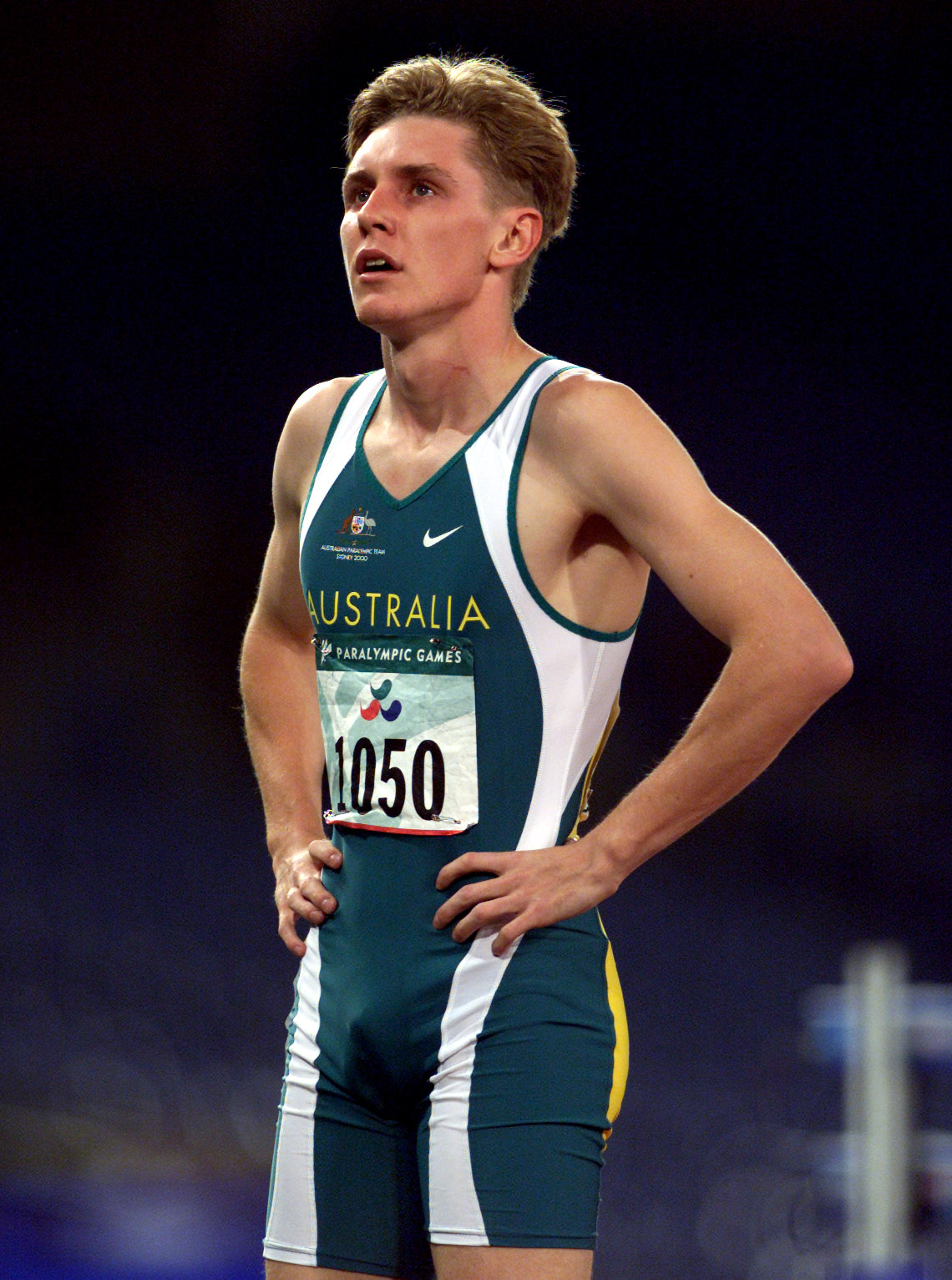
- Portrait of Newell after winning bronze in the 400 m T20 event at the 2000 Summer Paralympics

Personal information
- Born: 28 February 1978 (age 48) Terrigal, New South Wales, Australia
Medal record
Men's para athletics
Representing Australia
Paralympic Games
Bronze medal – third place	2000 Sydney	100m T20
Bronze medal – third place	2000 Sydney	400m T20

Andrew Newell (born 28 February 1978 in Terrigal, New South Wales) is a Paralympic athletics competitor from New South Wales, Australia. Newell has an intellectual disability. He won two bronze medals at the 2000 Sydney Games in the men's 100m T20 event and the men's 400m T20 event. He competed at the 2002 IPC Athletics World Championships in 100m T20 and finished seventh in the final.
