= María Mercedes Capa Estrada =

Spanish goalball player

Mercedes Capa
Personal information
- Full name: Maria Mercedes Capa Estrada
- Born: 23 August 1970 (age 55) Valladolid, Spain

Sport
- Country: Spain
- Sport: Women's Goalball

Maria Mercedes Capa Estrada (born 23 August 1970 in Valladolid) is a goalball athlete from Spain. She has a disability: she is blind and a B2 type goalball player. She competed for Spain at the 1992 Summer Paralympics and the 1996 Summer Paralympics.
