= Joseba Larrinaga =

Spanish Paralympic athlete (1968–2013)

Medal record

Paralympic athletics

Representing Spain

Paralympic Games
Silver medal – second place	1996 Atlanta	Marathon - T42-46

Joseba Jon Larrinaga Perea (Note: In this Spanish name, the first or paternal surname is Larrinaga and the second or maternal family name is Perea.) (5 June 1968 – 7 May 2013) was a paralympic athlete from Spain who competed mainly in category T46 distance running events. He was born in Aretxabaleta.

Joseba had twice competed at the Paralympics, first in the 1996 then in the 2000. At the 1996 games, he competed in the 5000m and the marathon, finishing fifth in the former and winning a silver medal in the latter in a mixed class of T42-46 behind compatriot Javier Conde, who set a new world record. In the 2000 games, he was restricted to the marathon; however, this time missed out on a medal, managing to finish in fifth.

Joseba died on 7 May 2013 in Aramaio after being struck by a car while riding his bicycle.
