= Vitali Krylov =

Russian Paralympic swimmer

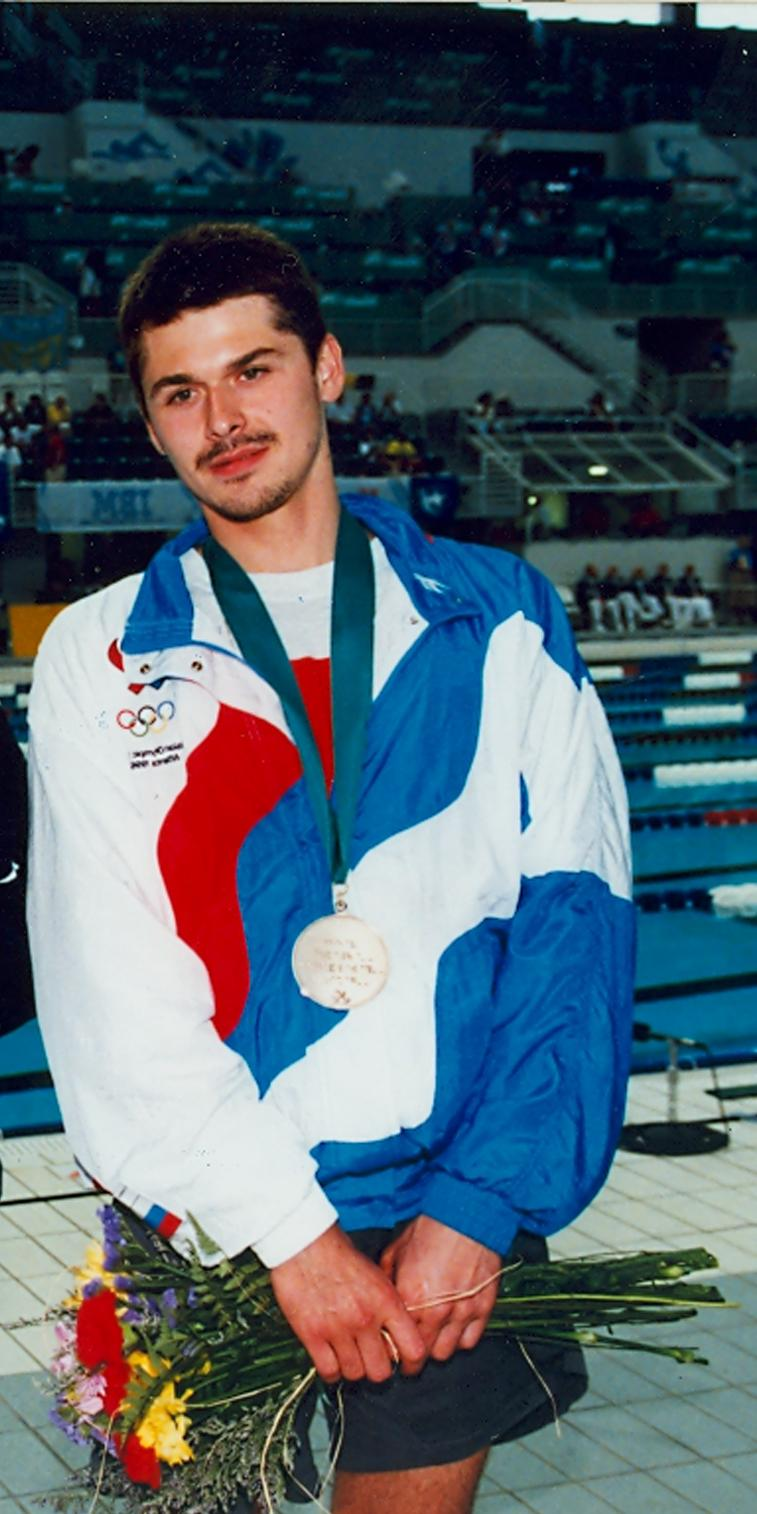
- Krylov at 1996 Paralympics

Sport
- Country: Russia
- Sport: Paralympic swimming
- Disability class: B2
Medal record
Paralympic swimming
Representing Unified Team
Paralympic Games
Gold medal – first place	1992 Barcelona	100 m breaststroke B2
Gold medal – first place	1992 Barcelona	200 m breaststroke B2
Representing Russia
Paralympic Games
Bronze medal – third place	1996 Atlanta	100 m breaststroke B2
Bronze medal – third place	1996 Atlanta	200 m breaststroke B2

Vitali Krylov is a paralympic swimmer from Russia competing mainly in category B2 events.

== Career ==
Krylov competed at two Paralympics for two different NPCs: firstly, in 1992, competing for the Unified Team and then as a member of the Russian team he competed in the 1996 Summer Paralympics. In 1992 he won gold in both the 100m and 200m breaststroke setting new world records in both distances. He also finished seventh in the 50m freestyle, fourth in the 100m butterfly and seventh in the 200m medley. At the 1996 games Krylov finished third in both the 100m and 200m breaststroke behind Australian Kingsley Bugarin who set world records in both events and in the 200m behind Denmark's Christian Bundgaard who set a B1 class world record. He also swam in the 50m freestyle finishing tenth and slowest in the heats therefore missing the final.
