= José Saura =

Spanish Paralympic athlete

Personal information
- Full name: José Benito Saura Méndez
- Born: 4 December 1978 (age 47) Murcia, Spain
Medal record
Men's para-athletics
Representing Spain
Paralympic Games
Silver medal – second place	1996 Atlanta	800 metres - T11

José Benito Saura Méndez (born 4 December 1978 in Murcia) is a paralympic athlete from Spain competing in category T11 800m events. He only competed once in the Paralympics, in 1996 when he was the second of three Spanish medalists in the T11 800m, splitting compatriots José Antonio Sánchez and Ruben Delgado.
