= Spain at the 1976 Summer Paralympics =

- IPC code: ESP
- NPC: Spanish Paralympic Committee
- Website: www.paralimpicos.es (in Spanish)

in Toronto
- Medals Ranked 22nd: Gold 4 Silver 6 Bronze 2 Total 12

Summer Paralympics appearances (overview)
- 1968; 1972; 1976; 1980; 1984; 1988; 1992; 1996; 2000; 2004; 2008; 2012; 2016; 2020; 2024

Spain sent a delegation to compete at the 1976 Summer Paralympics in Toronto, Canada. Its athletes finished twenty second in the overall medal count.

== See also ==
- 1976 Summer Paralympics
- Spain at the 1976 Summer Olympics
