= Ruben Delgado =

Spanish Paralympic athlete

Medal record

Men's para-athletics

Representing Spain

Paralympic Games
| Bronze medal – third place | 1996 Atlanta | 800 m T11 |

Ruben Delgado is a paralympic athlete from Spain competing mainly in category T11 distance running events.

Ruben competed in the 1996 and 2000 Summer Paralympics winning one medal. That medal came in the 800m in 1996 where he finished in third behind compatriots José Antonio Sánchez (gold) and José Saura (silver), he also finished fourth in the 1500m but dropped out of the 5000m. In the 2000 games he missed the final of 800m by eight hundredths of a second and finished fourth in the 1500m.
