= Pepe Sánchez =

Pepe Sánchez may refer to:

- Pepe Sánchez (musician) (1856–1918), Cuban musician
- Pepe Sánchez (footballer) (born 2000), Spanish footballer
- Pepe Sánchez (basketball) (born 1977), Argentine former professional basketball player
- Pepe Sánchez (director) (1934–2016), Colombian actor, scriptwriter and director (Pobres Rico et al.)

== See also ==
- Jose Sanchez (disambiguation), 'Pepe' being a diminutive for 'Jose'
