= José Ortiz (runner) =

Spanish Paralympic athlete

Medal record

Track and field (athletics)

Representing Spain

Paralympic Games
Silver medal – second place	1992 Barcelona	Marathon - B2

José Ortiz is a paralympic athlete from Spain competing mainly in category B2 marathon events.

Ortiz only ever competed in one event at a single Paralympics, this was the marathon at the 1992 Summer Paralympics in his home country where he finished second to Great Britain's Stephen Brunt.
