= Marcelino Paz =

Spanish Paralympic athlete

Medal record

Track and field (athletics)

Representing Spain

Paralympic Games
Gold medal – first place	1992 Barcelona	100 metres - B2
Gold medal – first place	1992 Barcelona	200 metres - B2
Gold medal – first place	1992 Barcelona	4x100 metre relay - B1-B3
Bronze medal – third place	1988 Seoul	100 metres - B2

Marcelino Paz is a paralympic athlete from Spain competing mainly in category B2 sprint events.

Marcelino competed at the 1988 Summer Paralympics winning a bronze medal in the 100m as well as finishing last in his semi final in the 400m. At the 1992 games in his home country he really shone setting Paralympic records on the way to winning gold in the 100m and 200m and was part of the Spanish 4 × 100 m relay team that won gold in a new world record time.
