= Khalid Mahmood (athlete) =

Pakistani para-athlete

Khalid Mahmood is a Pakistani para-athlete. In 1992, along with Khawar Malik, he became one of Pakistan's first two Paralympians, competing at the 1992 Summer Paralympics in Barcelona, Spain. Mahmood competed in the discus event in the B1 class.
