= Jordi Mendoza =

Personal information
- Full name: Jorge Mendoza Parrado
- Nationality: Spanish
- Born: 15 June 1972 (age 54) Barcelona, Spain

Sport
- Country: Spain
- Sport: Para-athletics, Goalball
- Disability class: B1
Medal record
Representing Spain
Paralympic Games
Men's para-athletics
Gold medal – first place	1992 Barcelona	Javelin B1
Bronze medal – third place	1992 Barcelona	Pentathlon B1
Men's goalball
Bronze medal – third place	1996 Atlanta	Team

Jorge "Jordi" Mendoza Parrado (born 15 June 1972 in Barcelona) is a B1 goalball player and track and field athlete from Spain. He played goalball at the 1996 Summer Paralympics. His team was third. He was as the 2000 Summer Paralympics in Sydney, Australia. He threw the discus and javelin.
