= María Ortega Gálvez =

Spanish artist

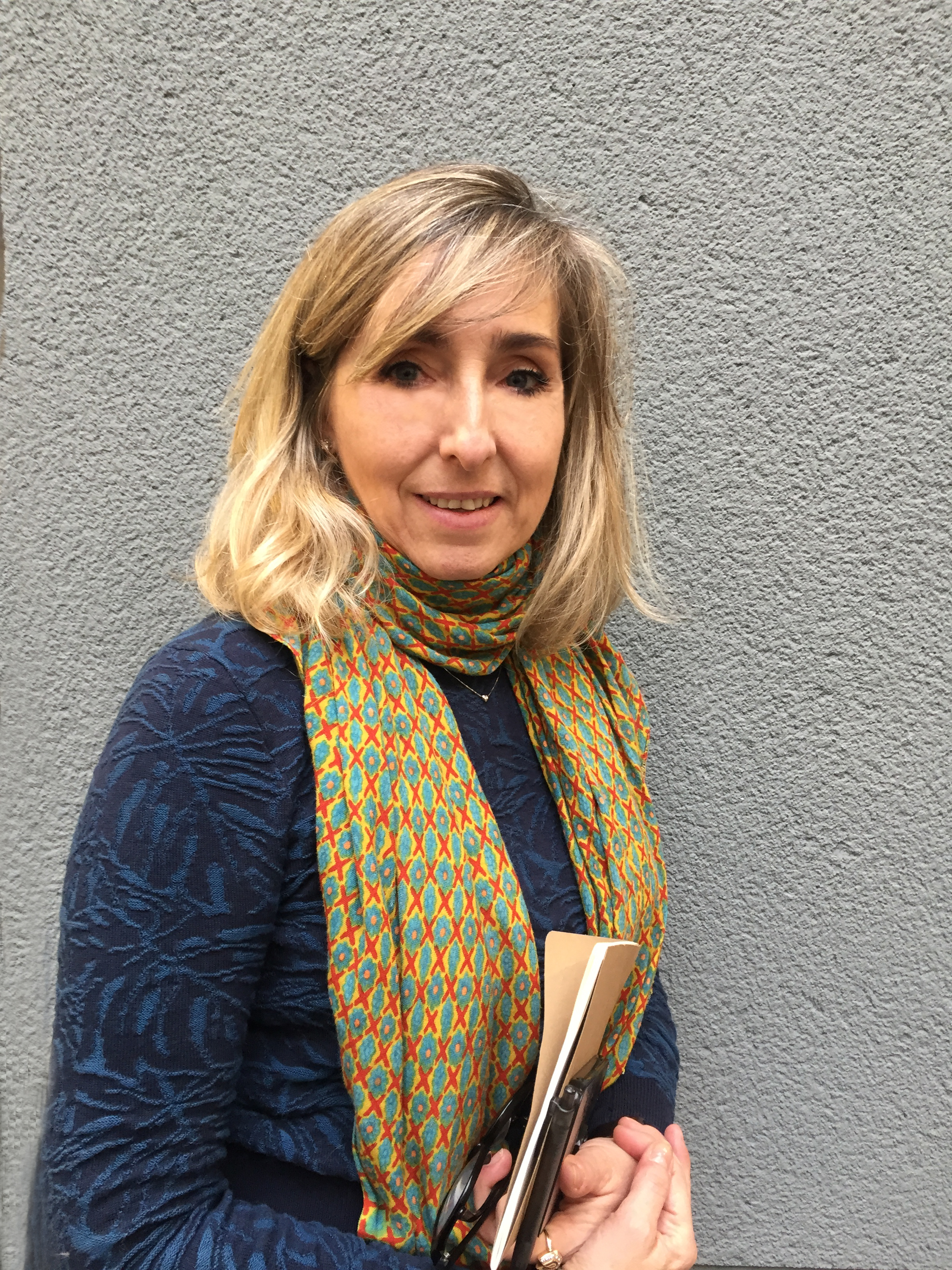
- Born: 1967 (age 58–59); Madrid, Spain
- Occupation: Textile artist
- Website: http://www.mariaortega.com

María Ortega Gálvez (born 1967) is a Spanish artist specializing in painting, engraving, photography and textiles. She is director of the international association World Textile Art (WTA) and director of WTA's VIII International Biennial of Contemporary Textile Art, held in Madrid, Spain in 2019.

== Biography ==
She studied design and styling at the School of Design in Madrid in 1986-89. When she finished her studies, she worked as a designer and stylist in Madrid with the Basque fashion designer Ángela Arregui until 1991.Ortega's interest in textiles started in 1992, when she created a design and haute couture workshop called Medium, which ran until 1999. She collaborated as a style coordinator in Pasarela Cibeles with the Basque designer Ángela Arregui from 1995 to 1999. During this time, she also worked as a stylist designer and image consultant for both national and international artists.

From 1996 to 1998, she collaborated as a stylist and image consultant on projects such as Héroes del Silencio, Mano Negra, La Frontera, Los Ronaldos, Gabinete Galigari and U2.

From 1999-2001, Ortego studied fiber art, sculpture and engraving at Blake Art College. From 2002-2004, she specialized in engraving and printing in the Madrid workshop of the Spanish-Colombian artist, Consuelo Vinchira.

She took a course in tapestry and silk painting at the Centro Cultural "Nicolás Salmerón", Madrid in 2004-2006. In 2009, Ortega took the raku ceramic course, in the Escuela de Cerámica de la Moncloa, Madrid. Due to her interest in photography, Ortega took a professional course of photography and digital laboratory in Madrid.

She completed a master's degree in cultural management at the Universidad Rey Juan Carlos in Madrid in 2013.

María Ortega has been the Spanish representative of the international organization World Textile Art since 2006, as well as an artist member. From 2008 to 2014, she worked as a curator and cultural manager. In recognition for her work in the field of textile art, she was appointed director general for Europe for WTA from 2013 to 2017.

Ortega was selected to participate in the 6th Riga International Textile and Fiber Art Triennial "Tradition and Innovation" in Riga (Latvia), as the only Spanish artist. She was also selected to participate in the Art of Today Textile Biennial in Bratislava (Slovakia), and was the only Spanish representative.

She participated in textile art conferences such as the 10th anniversary of "Women in Textile Art", Miami USA. IV Biennial of Textile Art Man+Woman = Creation WTA, Costa Rica. "Fibras 08 and 09" Contemporary Textile Art, Spain. Vth International Biennial of Textile Art WTA, Argentina. 1º Encuentro de la Red Textilia, Costa Rica

She was the winner of the second prize at WTA's V International Biennial of Textile Art held in Buenos Aires, Argentina in 2009.

With her influence as WTA's European director, the biennial exhibition moved to Europe for the first time. The Biennial of Textile Art 2019 was held in Madrid in different venues under the heading "Sustainable City". The venues used were Centro de Arte Complutense (C arteC) UCM, Real Jardín Botánico Alfonso XIII UCM, Museo del Traje, Museo de América, and Centro Cultural Galileo, where invited artists were exhibited.

== Selected exhibitions ==
- 2015. 5th Riga International Textile & Fiber Art Triennial, Riga, Letonia.
- 2016. 18th international exhibition of textile miniatures Face to Face. Bratislava.
- 2016. 9th International Fiber Art Exhibition "From Lausanne to Beijing", China.
- 2016, 2017 & 2018 Asia-Europe III, German Textile museum Frefeld in Germany, Central Museum of Textile in Lodz, Janina Monkute-Marks Museum in Lithuania.
- 2017. Exhibition Double width, weaving with art, Cultural Center of Spain in Montevideo. VII International Biennial of Contemporary Textile Art WTA Uruguay.
- 2017. Artist Book Exhibition, "Dialogues between both shores of the Atlantic" Archimboldo Gallery, Argentina.
- 2018. Exhibition "Faces of Oblivion" VIII Centenary of the University of Salamanca Plaza Mayor, Casa de las Conchas and Hospedería Fonseca.
- 2018. 6th Riga International Textile & Fiber Art Triennial, Riga, Letonia.
- 2018. 10th International Fiber Art Exhibition "From Lausanne to Beijing", China.
- 2018. Chaozhou International Embroidery Art Biennial Collection; Embroidery & Contemporary Life, China.
- 2018/2019. Trienal Textile Art Of Today, Bratislava

== Exhibitions as a curator ==
- 2008. Exhibition FIBRAS 08, Contemporary Textile Art. Costume Museum. CIPE. Madrid. September 12-November 2.
- 2009. Exhibition FIBRAS 09, Contemporary Textile Art. Spaces for Art Caja Madrid: in Ciudad Real, 09.01.09-08.02.09; in Aranjuez, 12.02.09-5.03.09; in Zaragoza, 26.03.09-24.05.09
- 2009. Exhibition FIBERSPAIN, Spanish Contemporary Textile Art. Visual Gallery Fiberscene, California, San Francisco. 2011. Thread to Thread Exhibition, Spanish Contemporary Textile Art. Parada 54 Gallery, Mexico City.
- 2011. Exhibition "The Nature Spirit" Japanese Contemporary Textile Art, Japanese Hispanic Cultural Center, Salamanca from September 14 to October 28.
- 2011/2012. Exhibition "The Nature Spirit" Japanese Contemporary Textile Art, c arte c (Centro de arte Complutense) from November 18, 2011 to January 15, 2012, Madrid.
- 2014. Exhibition FIBER FUTURES: Pioneers of Japanese Textile Art, c arte c (Centro de arte Complutense) from April 3 to May 18, 2014, Madrid.
- 2015. Exhibition "Japanese Contemporary Art, Miniatures" XV Cultural Week of Japan
- 2016. Exhibition Punto quebrado, las huellas del exodo, Casa de Vacas Cultural Center, Madrid and Jorge Rando Museum, Málaga.
- 2017. Exhibition Double width, weaving with art, Cultural Center of Spain in Montevideo. VII International Biennial of Contemporary Textile Art WTA Uruguay.
- 2017. Artist Book Exhibition, "Dialogues between both shores of the Atlantic" Archimboldo Gallery, Argentina.
- 2018. Exhibition Faces of Oblivion VIII Centenary of the University of Salamanca. Plaza Mayor, Casa de las Conchas and Hospedería Fonseca.

== Awards and distinctions ==
- 2003. Finalist in the Contemporary Engraving Award. Employment and Women's Department, Community of Madrid.
- 2006. Finalist IV Biennial of Textile Art WTA, Costa Rica. 2007. Finalist Print Award "José Hernández". City Hall of Pinto, Madrid.
- 2007. Finalist VIII San Lorenzo de El Escorial Printmaking Award. Culture House, Madrid.
- 2008. Finalist XXXVI International Printmaking Award "Carmen Arazona", Santa Cruz de la Palma.
- 2008. Finalist XVI ESTAMPA, Madrid. 2009. Finalist XVI National Print Awards. Museum of Spanish Contemporary Engraving, Marbella.
- 2009. Second Prize V International Biennial of Textile Art WTA, Buenos Aires, Argentina.
- 2009. Finalist XIX Contemporary Art Exhibition, MINIARTEXTIL cosmos, San Franchesco Church, Como, Italy.
- 2009. Finalist XIX Contemporary Engraving Award, Conserjería de Empleo y Mujer, Buenos Aires, Argentina. Community of Madrid.
- 2013. Finalist 2 Madrid Artist Book Fair, Masquelibros.
- 2013. Finalist Art al Vent X, Gata de los Gorgos.
