= María Ángeles Calderón =

Spanish goalball player

Personal information
- Full name: María Ángeles Calderón González
- Born: 27 October 1974 (age 51) Madrid, Spain
Medal record
Women's goalball
Representing Spain
Paralympic Games
Silver medal – second place	2000 Sydney	Team

María Ángeles Calderón González (born 27 October 1974 in Madrid) is a goalball player from Spain. She is blind and is a type B2 goalball player. She works for ONCE selling coupons. She played goalball at the 2000 Summer Paralympics. Her team was second.
