= José Arturo Sánchez =

Dominican footballer

Personal information
- Full name: José Arturo Sánchez Méndez
- Date of birth: 26 August 1996 (age 30)
- Place of birth: Almería, Spain
- Height: 1.88 m (6 ft 2 in)
- Positions: Forward; defensive midfielder

Team information
- Current team: Atlántico

Youth career
- 2011–2012: Ciudad de Vícar
- 2012–2013: ADP Parador
- 2014: La Mojonera CF

Senior career*
Years	Team	Apps	(Gls)
2012	ADP Parador	1	(0)
2016–	Atlántico		

International career^{‡}
2016–	Dominican Republic	1	(0)
- * Club domestic league appearances and goals ‡ National team caps and goals as of 31 August 2016

José Arturo Sánchez Méndez (born 26 August 1996) is a Dominican footballer who plays as a forward for Atlántico FC and the Dominican Republic national team.

== International career ==
Sánchez made his international debut on 30 August 2016, when he entered as an 88th-minute substitute in a win friendly against Puerto Rico.
