= Hipólito González =

Spanish goalball player

Personal information
- Full name: Hipólito González Calvo
- Nationality: Spanish
- Born: 10 November 1976 (age 49) Barcelona, Spain

Sport
- Country: Spain
- Sport: Goalball (B2)
Medal record
Men's goalball
Representing Spain
Paralympic Games
Bronze medal – third place	1996 Atlanta	Team
Bronze medal – third place	2000 Sydney	Team

Hipólito González Calvo (born 10 November 1976 in Barcelona) is a blind B2 goalball athlete from Spain. He played goalball at the 1996 Summer Paralympics. His team came in third place. He played goalball at the 2000 Summer Paralympics. His team came third yet again.
