= José Sánchez Peñate =

Spanish food company

José Sánchez Peñate, S.A.
- Formation: 1964; 62 years ago
- Founder: José Sánchez Peñate
- Type: Sociedad Anónima
- Headquarters: Calle Eufemiano Fuentes Cabrera, 21, 35014; Las Palmas de Gran Canaria, Las Palmas, España.
- CFO: Aridani Ramírez
- Website: www.jsp.es

José Sánchez Peñate, S.A. (JSP) is a corporation in the Canary Islands, Spain. It operates in the food sector, mainly in the preparation and packaging of dairy products, as well as other products such as coffees, infusions, meat products, and canned fruits. It operates two main dairy factories in Tenerife, and has other plants throughout the Canary Islands. Its headquarters are located in Las Palmas, Gran Canaria.

JSP, along with the associated companies CELGAN; Industria Panificadora JSP, S.L.; and Sun-Group, currently have a total staff of more than 1,000 workers.

== History ==
José Sánchez Peñate founded the company in 1964, with the collaboration of his son José Sánchez Rodríguez and the Molina family. The company was initially aimed at marketing bulk fruit products and infusions, and was based in a small warehouse in the Guanarteme neighborhood of Las Palmas. In the 1960s and 1970s there was a shortage of fresh milk on the Canary Islands, reaching levels that only fulfilled 20% of the population's needs. The company took advantage of these circumstances and changed course to focus its activity on packaging of dairy products.

In 1966, JSP, S.A. expanded to create a packaging plant for the distribution of powdered dairy products in the Miller Bajo industrial district of Las Palmas de Gran Canaria. Soon after, JSP, S.A. opened its first branch in Tenerife. In this same year, the marketing of Millac powdered milk began. Subsequently, this product became the leader in the Canarian market.

In 1975, JSP, S.A. began its commercialization in the mainland of Spain, directing its activity towards the vending sector. Currently, the Madrid office in Getafe has a coffee roaster, a bottling plant for products for the vending sector, automatic machines and, more recently, a frozen pastry factory.

In 1983, JSP, S.A. purchased the Central Lechera de Tenerife: Celgán, with which it expanded its line of dairy products to yoghurts and desserts.

In 1984, JSP, S.A. expanded into Los Majuelos on the island of Tenerife, with the new plant dedicated to the roasting, packaging and marketing of coffee. In that same year, an industrial plant for dairy products was created in Güímar on Tenerife, where liquid Millac is manufactured, in addition to other brands, some of them manufactured exclusively for large distribution chains.

In 1997, JSP, S.A. began its activity in the industrial bakery sector, through MYL Alimentos, creating Industria Panificadora JSP, S.L. The projection in this sector led to JSP expanding this activity in the year 2000 with two frozen bread, pastry and pastry factories in each of the Canary Islands capitals.

At the end of 2009, after an investment of almost one million euros, a fresh pastry workshop opened in the Miller Bajo industrial district.

The company faced financial difficulties during the COVID-19 pandemic, and the main Celgán factory stopped operations in October 2021. The Celgán brand was discontinued in December of that year.

== Brands ==
JSP currently sells under four brands, three dedicated to manufacturing and distribution in the food sector and one in the tourism sector. JSP markets its series of food products under the following brands:

- JSP (Coffee, teas, and canned fruits)
- Millac (Milk, powdered milk, baby formula, shakes, yogurts and juices)
- Celgán (Milk, condensed and evaporated milk, desserts, custards, cheeses, yogurts and juices)
