= Ricardo Fernández =

Spanish goalball player

Ricardo Fernandez Tio
Personal information
- Nationality: Spanish
- Born: 5 January 1976 (age 50) Castellón

Sport
- Country: Spain
- Sport: Goalball (B1)
Medal record
Goalball
Representing Spain
Paralympic Games
Bronze medal – third place	1996 Atlanta	Men's team
Bronze medal – third place	2000 Sydney	Men's team

Ricardo Fernández Tio (born 5 January 1976 in Castellón) is a B1 classified goalball athlete from Spain. He played goalball at the 1996 Summer Paralympics. His team was third. He played goalball at the 2000 Summer Paralympics. His team was third.
