= Concepción Dueso Garcés =

Spanish goalball player

Concepción Dueso
Personal information
- Full name: Concepción Dueso Garcés
- Born: 27 October 1967 (age 58) Huesca, Spain
Medal record
Women's goalball
Representing Spain
Paralympic Games
Silver medal – second place	2000 Sydney	Team

Concepción Dueso Garcés (born 27 October 1967 in Huesca) is a goalball player from Spain. She is blind and is a type B3 goalball player. She played goalball at the 2000 Summer Paralympics. Her team was second.
