= Francisco Pérez (athlete) =

Spanish Paralympic athlete

Medal record

Paralympic athletics

Representing Spain

Paralympic Games
Bronze medal – third place	1996 Atlanta	Marathon - T11

Francisco Pérez is a paralympic athlete from Spain competing mainly in category T11 distance running events.

Francisco competed in the 1996 Summer Paralympics in Atlanta. He finished fourth in the 10,000m and won a bronze medal in the marathon.
