= María Vanesa Ortega Godoy =

Spanish Paralympic athlete

Personal information
- Born: 24 March 1981 (age 45) Málaga, Spain

Sport
- Country: Spain
- Sport: Paralympic athletics
- Disability: Congenital cataracts
- Disability class: T11
Medal record
Paralympic athletics
Representing Spain
Paralympic Games
| Silver medal – second place | 1996 Atlanta | 400 m T11 |
IBSA World Games
| Gold medal – first place | 1998 Madrid | 400m T12 |
| Silver medal – second place | 1998 Madrid | 200m T12 |
IBSA European Athletics Championships
| Gold medal – first place | 1994 London | 60m T12 |
| Gold medal – first place | 1994 London | 800m T12 |
| Gold medal – first place | 1994 London | 4x100m relay T12 |
| Gold medal – first place | 1994 London | Long jump F12 |
| Gold medal – first place | 1997 Riccione | 400m T12 |
| Silver medal – second place | 1999 Lisbon | 400m T12 |
| Bronze medal – third place | 1999 Lisbon | 200m T12 |

María Vanesa Ortega Godoy (born 24 March 1981) is a Spanish former Paralympic athlete competing mainly in category T11 sprint events. She was a Paralympic silver medalist.

== Biography ==
Ortega was born with congenital cataracts as a result of her mother contracting rubella during pregnancy. Her sporting career began in January 1994 when her parents took her to Seville to Louis Braille Education Resource Centre she met her first coach Florencio Morcillo, he trained her for less than a month and she competed at her first ever track and field competition for the blind and visually impaired in Torremolinos, she then qualified for the IBSA European Championships in London. She conquered the championships and won four golds in sprinting events and the long jump. She became a national champion in the 400m and 800m a year later, she was selected once more to compete at the IBSA European Championships in Valencia but she couldn't because she had eye surgery.

She competed as part of the Spanish Paralympic athletics team at the 1996 Summer Paralympics in Atlanta following her two consecutive wins at the Spanish national championships, she was one of the youngest competitors of the Spanish delegation just aged fifteen. She finished second in her 200m heat behind Germany's Claire Brunotte who set a world record only to lose it in the final and then finished second behind Russia's Rima Batalova in the 400m final earning her the silver medal. After Ortega won her Paralympic silver medal, she went on to compete at the IBSA World Games in 1998 in Madrid where she won two more medals, followed by two gold medals at the 1998 World Junior Championships in Prague in 400m and shot put. She also participated at the 2001 IAAF World Championships in the 100m T12 demonstration event.
