= Mirosław Pych =

Polish Paralympic athlete (born 1972)

Medal record

Paralympic athletics

Representing Poland

Paralympic Games
Gold medal – first place	1992 Barcelona	Pentathlon B2
Gold medal – first place	1992 Barcelona	Javelin throw F12
Gold medal – first place	1996 Atlanta	Pentathlon P11
Gold medal – first place	1996 Atlanta	Javelin throw F11
Gold medal – first place	2000 Sydney	Pentathlon P12
Silver medal – second place	1996 Atlanta	100m T11
Silver medal – second place	2004 Athens	Javelin throw F12
Bronze medal – third place	1992 Barcelona	100m B2
Bronze medal – third place	1992 Barcelona	100m B2
Bronze medal – third place	2008 Beijing	Javelin throw F11-12

IPC Athletics European Championships
Silver medal – second place	2012 Stadskanaal	Javelin throw F12/13

Mirosław Pych (born 15 March 1972 in Słubice) is a Paralympic athlete from Poland competing mainly in category P12 pentathlon events.

He competed in the 1992 Summer Paralympics in Barcelona, Spain. There he won a gold medal in the men's Pentathlon - B2 event, a bronze medal in the men's 100 metres - B2 event and finished fourth in the men's Javelin throw - B2 event. He also competed at the 1996 Summer Paralympics in Atlanta, United States. There he won a gold medal in the men's Pentathlon - P11 event, a gold medal in the men's Javelin throw - F11 event, a silver medal in the men's 100 metres - T11 event and finished eighth in the men's Long jump - F11 event. He also competed at the 2000 Summer Paralympics in Sydney, Australia. There he won a gold medal in the men's Pentathlon - P12 event and a gold medal in the men's Javelin throw - F12 event. He also competed in the 2004 Summer Paralympics in Athens, Greece. There he won a silver medal in the men's Javelin throw - F12 event and did not finish in the men's Pentathlon - P13 event. He also competed at the 2008 Summer Paralympics in Beijing, China. There he won a bronze medal in the men's Javelin throw - F11-12 event.
