= Concepción Hernández Díaz =

Spanish goalball player

Concepción Hernández
Personal information
- Full name: Concepción Hernández Díaz
- Born: 13 October 1972 (age 53) Murcia, Spain
Medal record
Women's goalball
Representing Spain
Paralympic Games
Silver medal – second place	2000 Sydney	Team

Concepción Hernández Díaz (born 13 October 1972 in Murcia) is a goalball player from Spain. She is blind and is a B2 type goalball player. She played goalball at the 1996 Summer Paralympics where the Spanish women's team finished in 4th place. She played goalball at the 2000 Summer Paralympics where the Spanish women's team finished second, winning a silver medal.
