= Jaime Serrano Alonso =

Spanish swimmer (born 1979)

Jaime Serrano
Personal information
- Full name: Jaime Serrano Alonso
- Nationality: Spanish
- Born: 30 April 1979 (age 47) Barcelona, Spain

Sport
- Country: Spain
- Sport: Swimming (S9)
Medal record
Swimming
Representing Spain
Paralympic Games
Gold medal – first place	2000 Sydney	400m freestyle S9
Silver medal – second place	2000 Sydney	200m individual medley SM9
World Championships
Silver medal – second place	1998 Christchurch	4x100m freestyle relay open
Silver medal – second place	2002 Mar del Plata	400m freestyle S9
Bronze medal – third place	2002 Mar del Plata	200m individual medley SM9

Jaime Serrano Alonso (born 30 April 1979) is an S9 swimmer from Spain. He competed at the 2000 Summer Paralympics in Sydney, winning a gold medal and World Record in the 400 meter freestyle race and a silver medal in the 200 meter individual medley race.

He swam with the Spanish paralympic team between 1997 and 2002 in three European championships, two world championships and in the Sydney Paralympic Games.
