= Magdalena Amo =

Spanish Paralympic athlete

Medal record

Track and field (athletics)

Representing Spain

Paralympic Games
Gold medal – first place	1996 Atlanta	Long Jump - F10-11
Silver medal – second place	1992 Barcelona	Long Jump - B2

Magdalena "Magda" Amo Rius (Note: In this Spanish name, the first or paternal surname is Amo and the second or maternal family name is Rius.) (born 23 July 1973) is a paralympic athlete from Spain competing mainly in category F10-11 long jump events.

Magdalena competed in the 1992 Summer Paralympics where she failed to finish the 200m but finished second in the long jump behind Raisa Zhuravleva who set a new games record. She returned for the 1996 Summer Paralympics concentrating on the long jump and it paid off as Magdalena came away with the gold medal in a new Paralympic record beating compatriot Rosalia Lazaro on count back with compatriot Purificacion Ortiz completing the Spanish clean sweep of medals.
