= Sara Luna Santana =

Spanish goalball player

Sara Luna
Personal information
- Full name: Sara Luna Santana
- Born: 16 April 1977 (age 49) Barcelona, Spain
Medal record
Representing Spain
Women's goalball
Paralympic Games
Silver medal – second place	2000 Sydney	Team
Women's para-duathlon
World Championships
Bronze medal – third place	2016 Aviles	PT5

Sara Luna Santana (born 16 April 1977 in Barcelona) is a goalball player from Spain. She is blind. She is a type B2 goalball player. She played goalball at the 1996 Summer Paralympics. Her team was third. She played goalball at the 2000 Summer Paralympics. Her team was second.
