= Andrés Martínez (athlete) =

Spanish Paralympic athlete

Medal record

Paralympic athletics

Representing Spain

Paralympic Games
Silver medal – second place	1992 Barcelona	Shot Put - B1
Bronze medal – third place	1996 Atlanta	Shot Put - F10

Andrés Martínez Sánchez (Note: In this Spanish name, the first or paternal surname is Martínez and the second or maternal family name is Sánchez.) (born 2 November 1954 in Inestrillas) is a paralympic athlete from Madrid, Spain competing mainly in category F10 shot put and discus events.

== Biography ==
Andres Martinez competed in two paralympics, firstly his home games in Barcelona in 1992 Summer Paralympics then in Atlanta in 1996 Summer Paralympics. In the 1992 games he finished fifth in both the pentathlon and discus before finishing second in the shot put behind compatriot Alfonso Fidalgo. The 1996 games gave him his third paralympic games fifth place, in the discus and a bronze medal in the shot put.
