= Jessica Malagón Moreno =

Spanish goalball player

Jessica Malagón
Personal information
- Full name: Jessica Malagón Moreno
- Born: 6 July 1977 (age 48) Barcelona, Spain
Medal record
Women's goalball
Representing Spain
Paralympic Games
| Silver medal – second place | 2000 Sydney | Team |

Jessica Malagón Moreno (born 6 July 1977 in Barcelona) is a goalball player from Spain. She is blind and is a type B2 goalball player. She played goalball at the 1996 Summer Paralympics. Her team was third. She played goalball at the 2000 Summer Paralympics. Her team was second.
