= Fernando Sardina =

Personal information
- Full name: José Fernando Sardina Santiago
- Nationality: Spanish
- Born: 16 September 1970 (age 55) Brañosera, Palencia, Spain

Sport
- Country: Spain
- Sport: Goalball (B2)
Medal record
Men's goalball
Representing Spain
Paralympic Games
Bronze medal – third place	1996 Atlanta	Team

José Fernando Sardina Santiago (born 16 September 1970 in Brañosera, Palencia) is a B2 goalball athlete from Spain. He played goalball at the 1996 Summer Paralympics. His team was third.
