= Juan José Fuertes Martínez =

Spanish Paralympic swimmer

Juan Fuertes
Personal information
- Full name: Juan José Fuertes Martínez
- Nationality: Spain
- Born: 11 March 1976 (age 50) Pamplona, Navarra, Spain

Sport
- Sport: Swimming
Medal record
Men's swimming
Representing Spain
Paralympic Games
Gold medal – first place	1992 Barcelona	4x50m freestyle relay S1-6
Gold medal – first place	1996 Atlanta	50m freestyle S5
Gold medal – first place	1996 Atlanta	100m freestyle S5
Silver medal – second place	1992 Barcelona	4x50m medley relay S1-6
Silver medal – second place	1996 Atlanta	200m freestyle S5
Silver medal – second place	1996 Atlanta	4x50m freestyle relay S1-6
Bronze medal – third place	1996 Atlanta	4x50m medley relay S1-6

Juan José Fuertes Martínez (born 11 March 1976 in Pamplona, Navarra) is an S5 swimmer from Spain. He has cerebral palsy. He competed at the 1992 winning a gold and silver medal in the freestyle and medley relay races respectively. He also competed at the 1996 Summer Paralympics winning a gold medal in the 50 meter freestyle and the 100 meter freestyle races, a silver medal in the 100 meter freestyle race and the 4 x 50 meter Freestyle relay 20 Points race and he also won a bronze medal in the 4 x 50 meter medley relay 20 Points race.
