= Kingsley Bugarin =

Australian Paralympic swimmer

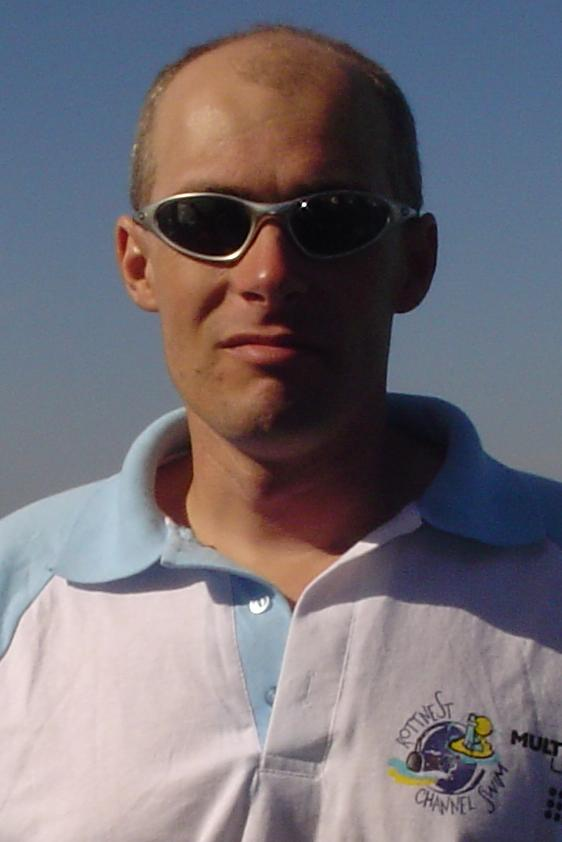
- After Rottnest channel swim 2005

Personal information
- Full name: Kingsley Haldane Bugarin
- Nickname: Biggles
- Nationality: Australia
- Born: 3 August 1968 (age 58) Mount Lawley, Western Australia
- Height: 1.78 m (5 ft 10 in)
- Weight: 73 kg (161 lb)
- Website: KingsleyBugarin.com.au

Sport
- Sport: Swimming
- Strokes: Breaststroke, Individual Medley, Freestyle, Butterfly
- Club: Swan Hills swimming club
Medal record
Men's swimming
Representing Australia
INTERNATIONAL CHAMPIONSHIPS
Paralympic Games
Gold medal – first place	1996 Atlanta	100m Breaststroke B2
Gold medal – first place	1996 Atlanta	200m Breaststroke B2
Gold medal – first place	1996 Atlanta	200m Individual Medley B2
Gold medal – first place	2000 Sydney	100m Breaststroke SB12
Gold medal – first place	2000 Sydney	200m Individual Medley SM12
Silver medal – second place	1984 New York	50m Freestyle B3
Silver medal – second place	1984 New York	50m Breaststroke B3
Silver medal – second place	1992 Barcelona	100m Breaststroke B2
Silver medal – second place	1992 Barcelona	200m Breaststroke B2
Silver medal – second place	1992 Barcelona	200m Individual Medley B2
Silver medal – second place	1996 Atlanta	100m Butterfly B2
Silver medal – second place	1996 Atlanta	100m Freestyle B2
Silver medal – second place	2000 Sydney	400m Freestyle S12
Bronze medal – third place	1984 New York	400m Breaststroke B3
Bronze medal – third place	1988 Seoul	50m Breaststroke B3
Bronze medal – third place	1988 Seoul	100m Breaststroke B3
Bronze medal – third place	1988 Seoul	200m Breaststroke B3
Bronze medal – third place	1992 Barcelona	50m Freestyle B2
Bronze medal – third place	1996 Atlanta	400m Freestyle B2
World Championships
Gold medal – first place	1990 Assen	200m Individual Medley
Gold medal – first place	1994 Valletta	100m Breaststroke
Gold medal – first place	1998 Madrid	100m Breaststroke
Gold medal – first place	1998 Madrid	200m Breaststroke
Gold medal – first place	1998 Madrid	200m Individual Medley
Gold medal – first place	1998 Madrid	100m Butterfly
Silver medal – second place	1990 Assen	100m Breaststroke
Silver medal – second place	1990 Assen	200m Breaststroke
Silver medal – second place	1994 Valletta	50m Freestyle
Bronze medal – third place	1986 Gothenburg	100m Breaststroke
Bronze medal – third place	1990 Assen	50m Freestyle
Bronze medal – third place	1994 Valletta	100m Freestyle
FESPIC games
Gold medal – first place	1989 Kobe	100m Backstroke
Gold medal – first place	1989 Kobe	200m Individual Medley
Gold medal – first place	1989 Kobe	100m Breaststroke
Gold medal – first place	1994 Beijing	50m Freestyle
Gold medal – first place	1994 Beijing	200m Individual Medley
Gold medal – first place	1994 Beijing	100m Breaststroke
Gold medal – first place	1994 Beijing	200m Breaststroke
British Telecom National Swimming Championships
Gold medal – first place	1998 Sheffield	100m Breaststroke
Gold medal – first place	1998 Sheffield	200m Individual Medley
Gold medal – first place	1999 Sheffield	100m Breaststroke
Gold medal – first place	1999 Sheffield	200m Individual Medley
Silver medal – second place	1998 Sheffield	100m Freestyle
Silver medal – second place	1998 Sheffield	100m Butterfly
Silver medal – second place	1999 Sheffield	100m Butterfly
Silver medal – second place	1999 Sheffield	400m Freestyle
Bronze medal – third place	1999 Sheffield	50m Freestyle
German Open Disabled Swimming Championships
Gold medal – first place	1999 Braunschweig	50m Breaststroke
Gold medal – first place	1999 Braunschweig	100m Breaststroke
Gold medal – first place	1999 Braunschweig	200m Individual Medley
Gold medal – first place	1999 Braunschweig	400m Freestyle
Silver medal – second place	1999 Braunschweig	100m Butterfly
Bronze medal – third place	1999 Braunschweig	50m Freestyle
Bronze medal – third place	1999 Braunschweig	100m Freestyle
Bronze medal – third place	1999 Braunschweig	50m Butterfly
NATIONAL CHAMPIONSHIPS
Gold medal – first place	1982 Perth	5 Gold
Gold medal – first place	1983 Brisbane	3 Gold
Gold medal – first place	1984 Melbourne	1 Gold
Gold medal – first place	1985 Canberra	7 Gold
Gold medal – first place	1986 Adelaide	4 Gold
Gold medal – first place	1988 Perth	7 Gold
Gold medal – first place	1989 Brisbane	4 Gold
Gold medal – first place	1990 Melbourne	5 Gold
Gold medal – first place	1992 Adelaide	8 Gold
Gold medal – first place	1993 Adelaide	3 Gold
Gold medal – first place	1994 Darwin	3 Gold
Gold medal – first place	1996 Sydney	1 Gold
Gold medal – first place	1997 Brisbane	3 Gold
Gold medal – first place	1998 Melbourne	2 Gold
Gold medal – first place	1999 Brisbane	1 Gold
Gold medal – first place	2000 Sydney	2 Gold
Silver medal – second place	1983 Brisbane	6 Silver
Silver medal – second place	1984 Melbourne	6 Silver
Silver medal – second place	1985 Canberra	1 Silver
Silver medal – second place	1986 Adelaide	3 Silver
Silver medal – second place	1997 Brisbane	3 Silver
Silver medal – second place	1999 Brisbane	2 Silver
Bronze medal – third place	1996 Sydney	1 Bronze
Bronze medal – third place	1998 Melbourne	2 Bronze
Bronze medal – third place	1999 Brisbane	1 Bronze
Bronze medal – third place	2000 Sydney	1 Bronze
WESTERN AUSTRALIA STATE OPEN WATER
Gold medal – first place	2008/09 round 3	o/35 2.5km
Silver medal – second place	2007/08 round 3	o/35 2.5km
Silver medal – second place	2009/10 round 1	o/35 2.5km
Silver medal – second place	2009/10 round 3	o/35 5km
Silver medal – second place	2010/11 round 4	o/35 5km
Silver medal – second place	2012/13 round 4	o/35 5km
Bronze medal – third place	2011/12 round 4	o/35 5km

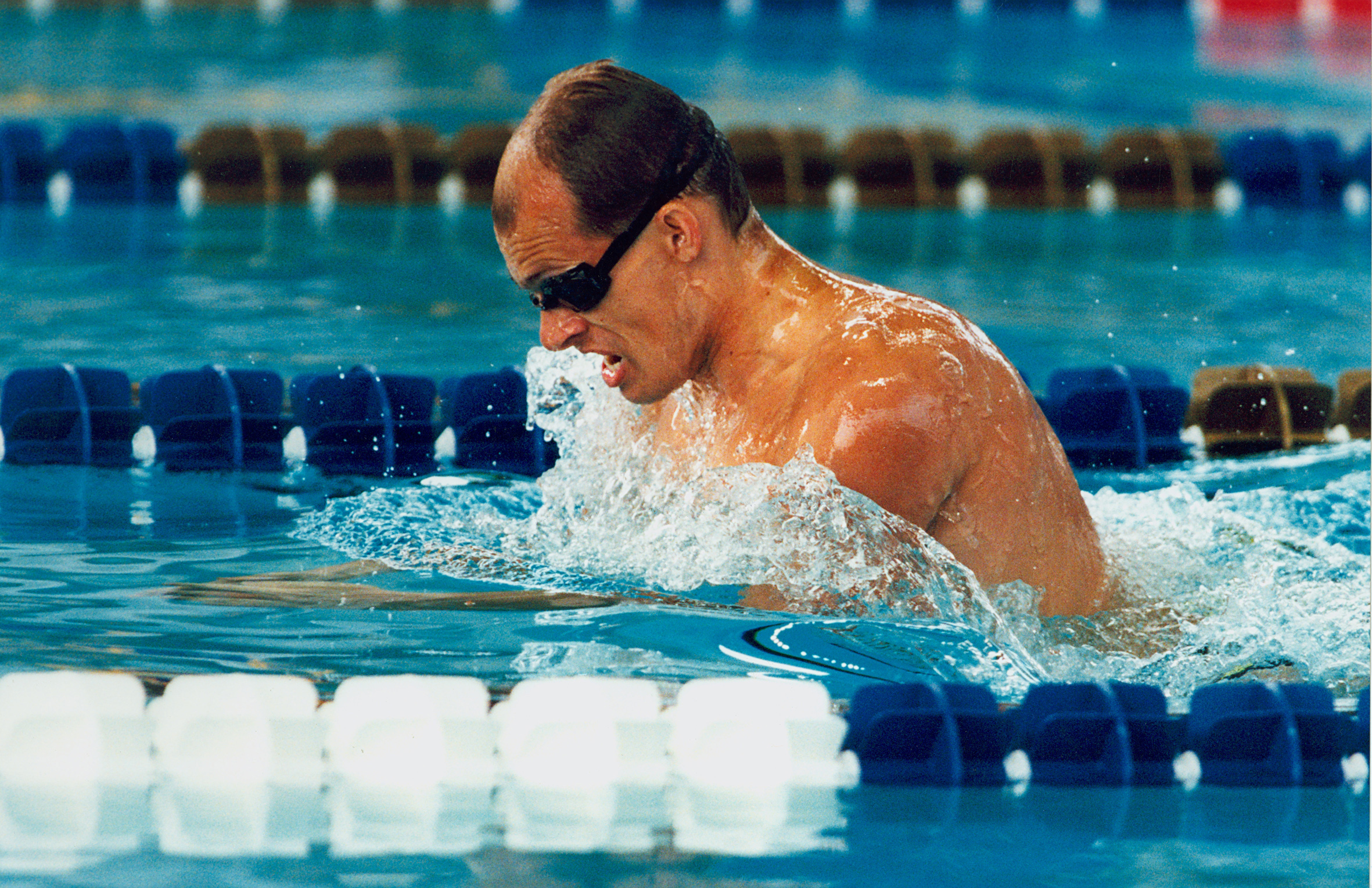
Australian S12 swimmer Kingsley Bugarin swims breaststroke at the 1996 Atlanta Paralympic Games

Kingsley Haldane Bugarin, OAM (born 3 August 1968) is an Australian Paralympic and vision impaired swimmer. He competed in five consecutive Summer Paralympics from 1984 to 2000, winning a total of five gold, eight silver, and six bronze medals. He held the Australian record for the highest Paralympic medal count until it was surpassed in 2012 by Matthew Cowdrey.

== Personal ==
He was born 3 August 1968 in Mount Lawley, Western Australia. He attended La Salle College, Perth. Bugarin married Indonesian triathlete Yanti Ardie during the SunSmart IRONMAN at Busselton, Western Australia in December 2014. Bugarin works as an information technology consultant.

== Swimming ==
Before his swimming career, Bugarin competed in track and field. At the age of 14, he took up competitive swimming training at Swan Hills Swimming Club in Midvale, Western Australia.

As a 16-year-old at the 1984 New York Paralympics, he won two silver medals and a bronze medal. He followed this up with three bronze medals at 1988 Seoul Paralympics.

At the 1990 IPC Swimming Championships in Assen, he won one gold, two silver and won bronze medal. This was followed up with three silver medals and one bronze medal at 1992 Barcelona. At the 1994 IPC Swimming Championships in Valenta, he won one gold, two silver and one bronze medals.

At the 1996 Atlanta Paralympics, he had his most successful Paralympics winning three gold, two silver and one bronze medals. He won four gold medals at 1999 IPC Swimming World Championships in Madrid.

During the late 1990s in the lead up to the Sydney Paralympics Bugarin moved to Claremont Uni Swimming Club to train with Matt Brown at the UWA Aquatic Centre and then called, Challenge Stadium.

At his final Paralympics, he won two gold and one silver medal at the 2000 Sydney Paralympics.

At the end of his career, Bugarin's overall international medal tally shows a total of 32 gold medals, 19 silver medals and 13 bronze medals. Over the duration of his career, Bugarin has won a total of 155 medals in competitions ranging from National Championships to Paralympic Games.

As of May 2019, Bugarin holds the world record for the 200 m breaststroke in class S12 with a time of 2:34.08 which he set on 19 October 1999 in Perth.

Bugarin is officially retired from high level competition but still trains and competes in open water swimming and triathlon events.

He was an Australian Institute of Sport scholarship holder from 1997 to 1999 in swimming.

== Achievements ==
In 1997, he received the Order of Australia (OAM) in recognition of service to sport as a gold medallist at the Atlanta Paralympic Games 1996.

In 2000, he received an Australian Sports Medal.

In 2008 he was inducted into the Western Australian Swimming Association Hall of Fame.

In 2019, he was made a Legend of the Western Australian Swimming Association Hall of Fame. He was the third swimmer to be made a Legend.
