= Sergio Sánchez Hernández =

Spanish Paralympic athlete

Personal information
- Nationality: Spanish
- Born: Sergio Sánchez Hernández; May 16, 1968 (age 58) Barcelona

Sport
- Country: Spain
- Sport: Track and field (T12-B2)
Medal record
Athletics
Representing Spain
Paralympic Games
Gold medal – first place	1996 Atlanta	4 X 400 meter T11-T13
Silver medal – second place	1996 Atlanta	400 meter T12

Sergio Sánchez Hernández (born May 16, 1968, in Barcelona) is a vision impaired T12/B2 track and field athlete from Spain. He competed at the 1996 Summer Paralympics, where he won a gold medal in the 4 X 400 meter T11-T13 race, and a silver in the 400 meter T12 race.
