= Silvia Vives Montlleó =

Spanish swimmer (born 1974)

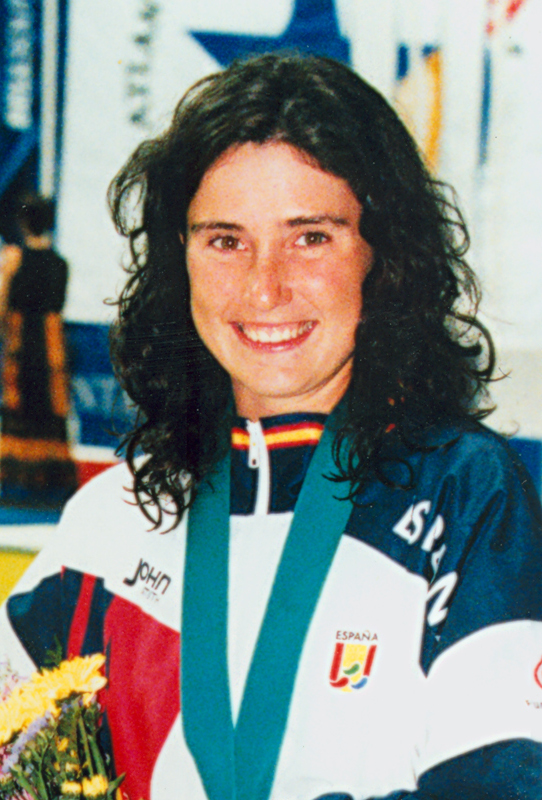
- Vives at the 1996 Paralympics

Personal information
- Nationality: Spanish
- Born: 17 August 1974 (age 51) Barcelona

Sport
- Country: Spain
- Sport: Swimming (S8)
Medal record
Swimming
Representing Spain
Paralympic Games
Silver medal – second place	1992 Barcelona	100m butterfly S8
Silver medal – second place	1996 Atlanta	100m backstroke S8
Silver medal – second place	1996 Atlanta	100m butterfly S8
Bronze medal – third place	1992 Barcelona	4x100m medley relay S7-10
Bronze medal – third place	1996 Atlanta	200m individual medley SM8
Bronze medal – third place	1996 Atlanta	4x100m medley relay S7-10
World Championships
Gold medal – first place	1994 Malta	100m butterfly S8
Gold medal – first place	1994 Malta	4x100m medley relay S7-10
Silver medal – second place	1994 Malta	200m individual medley SM8

Silvia Vives Montlleó (born 17 August 1974 in Barcelona) is an S8 swimmer from Spain. She has a disability and is an S8-type swimmer. She competed at the 1996 Summer Paralympics, winning a silver medal in the 100-meter butterfly race and silver in the 100-meter backstroke race. She won a bronze medal in the 4 x 100-meter 34 points medley relay and the 200-meter individual medley.
