= Pablo Corral Embade =

Spanish Paralympic swimmer

Pablo Corral
Personal information
- Full name: Pablo Corral Embade
- Nationality: Spain
- Born: 25 January 1972 (age 54) A Coruña, Spain

Sport
- Sport: Swimming
Medal record
Men's para swimming
Representing Spain
Paralympic Games
Silver medal – second place	1988 Seoul	100 m backstroke B2
Silver medal – second place	1992 Barcelona	50 m freestyle B2
Silver medal – second place	1996 Atlanta	50 m freestyle B2

Pablo Corral Embade (born January 25, 1972, in A Coruña) is a vision impaired B2/S12 swimmer from Spain. He competed at the 1996 Summer Paralympics, winning a silver in the 50 meter freestyle.
