= Begoña Reina López =

Spanish Paralympic swimmer

Begoña Reina
Personal information
- Full name: Begoña Reina López
- Nationality: Spanish
- Born: 14 March 1975 (age 51) Zaragoza, Spain

Sport
- Country: Spain
- Sport: Swimming (S9)
Medal record
Women's swimming
Representing Spain
Paralympic Games
Gold medal – first place	1992 Barcelona	100 m breaststroke SB9
Bronze medal – third place	1992 Barcelona	4x100 m medley S7-10
Bronze medal – third place	1996 Atlanta	100 m breaststroke SB9
Bronze medal – third place	1996 Atlanta	4x100 m medley S7-10
World Championships
Silver medal – second place	1994 Malta	100 m breaststroke SB9
Gold medal – first place	1994 Malta	4x100 m medley S7-10

Begoña Reina López (born 14 March 1975 in Zaragoza) is an S9 swimmer from Spain. She competed at the 1996 Summer Paralympics, winning a pair of bronze medals in the 100 meter breaststroke and the 4 x 100 meter 34 points medley relay.
