= Purificación Ortiz =

Spanish Paralympic athlete

Medal record

Paralympic athletics

Representing Spain

Paralympic Games
Gold medal – first place	1992 Barcelona	Long Jump - B1
Silver medal – second place	1992 Barcelona	100 metres - B1
Bronze medal – third place	1992 Barcelona	200 metres - B1
Bronze medal – third place	1996 Atlanta	Long Jump - F10-11

Purificación Ortiz (Campo de Criptana, 1972) is a paralympic athlete from Spain competing mainly in category F11 (totally blind) long jump and sprint events.

== Biography ==
Purificación competed in three Paralympic games, first in 1988 then in 1992 in her home country and finally 1996. At her first games she finished fifth in the B1 long jump. She followed this up in 1992 with a new world record on the way to winning gold in the long jump, she also finished second behind compatriot Purificación Santamarta who twice broke the world record in the 100m and finished third in the 200m in a race again won by her compatriot Purificacion Santamarta in a world record time. In 1996 she was entered in the 100m but didn't run but did compete in the long jumpfinishing third behind her fellow Spaniards Magdalena Amo and Rosalía Lázaro who both jumped a new Paralympic record.
