= Alejo Vélez =

Spanish Paralympic athlete (born 1968)

Medal record

Track and field (athletics)

Representing Spain

Paralympic Games
Gold medal – first place	1992 Barcelona	High Jump - b2
Silver medal – second place	1996 Atlanta	High Jump - F10-11

Alejo José Vélez Cucalón (Note: In this Spanish name, the first or paternal surname is Vélez and the second or maternal family name is Cucalón.) (born 1 May 1968) is a paralympic athlete from Spain competing mainly in category F11 jumping events.

Vélez competed in his first paralympics in his home country in 1992 as well as travelling to Atlanta for the 1996 Summer Paralympics. In 1992 he competed in the long jump, triple jump and pentathlon finishing fifth, fourth and eighth as well as setting a new paralympic games record in the high jump to win gold by 20 cm. He failed to register a performance in the 1996 long jump and then despite jumping higher than four years ago lost out to Belarusian Oleg Chapel in the high jump.
