= José Antonio Expósito =

Spanish Paralympic athlete

Personal information
- Full name: José Antonio Expósito Piñero
- Nationality: Spanish
- Born: 2 May 1978 (age 48) Águilas, Murcia, Spain

Sport
- Country: Spain
- Sport: Track and field (T20)
Medal record
Men's para athletics
Representing Spain
Paralympic Games
Gold medal – first place	2000 Sydney	100 m - T20
Gold medal – first place	2000 Sydney	Long jump - T20
Gold medal – first place	2012 London	Long jump - T20

José Antonio Expósito Piñero (born 2 May 1978 in Águilas, Murcia) is a Paralympic athlete from Spain.

== Personal ==
Expósito was born in 1978. He has an intellectual disability. In 2013, he was awarded the gold Real Orden al Mérito Deportivo. In November 2013, he attended the Gala Sports Columbine, which was held in the Auditorium and Congress Palace Infanta Doña Elena, and where he received a standing ovation.

== Athletics ==
Antonio competes in T20 (track) and F20 (field) events. He has held the T20 Long Jump world record since 2005. He competed at the 2008 INAS World Indoor Athletics Championships held in Tallinn, Estonia, earning gold in the 60 meters and long jump, and picking up a bronze in the 4x400 meter event. He won the 2010 European championships in the 100 meters and long jump events.

Expósito competed in 2010 INAS European Athletics Championship and picked up a pair of gold medals in the long jump and 100 meter events. He qualified for and competed in the 2011 IPC Athletics World Championships where he was one of thirty-two competitors representing Spain. He competed in the 2011 INAS World Games, winning a silver medal in the 4x100 meter relay alongside Francisco Santiago, Alberto Palomo and Dionibel Rodríguez Rodríguez.

Expósito has won the Spanish national championships in his classification. He competed in the 2012 Spanish national championships held in San Javier. In 2012, he was a recipient of a Plan ADOP €23,000 athlete scholarship with a €3,000 reserve and a €2,500 coaching scholarship. He competed in the 2013 World Athletics Championships for people with intellectual disabilities hosted by the Czech Republic. He picked up a gold medal at the event in the long jump. He injured himself after his final jump. In July 2013, he participated in the 2013 IPC Athletics World Championships.

=== Paralympics ===
Expósito was part of the Spanish team at the 2000 Summer Paralympics. He competed in the javelin and shot put but it was in the 100m and long jump where he won gold medals. Following a cheating scandal at the Sydney games, events for athletes with intellectual disability were excluded from the Paralympic program. They were reinstated at the 2012 Summer Paralympics where, as in 2000, Jose Antonio won a gold medal in the T20 Long Jump event.
