= María Begoña Redal =

Spanish goalball player

Personal information
- Full name: María Begoña Redal Giraldos
- Nationality: Spanish
- Born: 3 August 1975 (age 50) Tudela, Navarre, Spain

Sport
- Sport: Goalball
Medal record
Women's goalball
Representing Spain
Paralympic Games
| Silver medal – second place | 2000 Sydney | Team |

María Begoña Ridal Giraldos (born 3 August 1975) is a retired Spanish goalball player who competed in international level events.
