= Francisco Muñoz Sánchez =

Spanish goalball player

Francisco Muñoz
Personal information
- Full name: Francisco Muñoz Sánchez
- Nationality: Spanish
- Born: 13 March 1970 (age 56) Valencia, Spain

Sport
- Country: Spain
- Sport: Goalball (B1)
Medal record
Men's goalball
Representing Spain
Paralympic Games
Bronze medal – third place	1996 Atlanta	Team

Francisco Muñoz Sánchez (born 13 March 1970 in Valencia) is a B1 goalball athlete from Spain. He played goalball at the 1996 Summer Paralympics. His team was third.
