= Jesús Iglesias (swimmer) =

Spanish Paralympic swimmer

Personal information
- Full name: Jesús Iglesias Cortés
- Nationality: Spanish
- Born: 25 December 1968 (age 57) Barcelona, Spain

Sport
- Country: Spain
- Sport: Swimming (S7)
Medal record
Swimming
Representing Spain
Paralympic Games
Gold medal – first place	1992 Barcelona	4x50m freestyle S1-6
Gold medal – first place	1996 Atlanta	100m breaststroke SB6
Silver medal – second place	1992 Barcelona	50m freestyle S6
Silver medal – second place	1992 Barcelona	4x50m medley relay S1-6
Silver medal – second place	1996 Atlanta	4x50m freestyle S1-6
Bronze medal – third place	1992 Barcelona	100m freestyle S6
Bronze medal – third place	1992 Barcelona	200m freestyle S6
Bronze medal – third place	1992 Barcelona	50m butterfly S6
Bronze medal – third place	1996 Atlanta	50m freestyle S7
Bronze medal – third place	1996 Atlanta	4x50m medley S1-6
World Championships
Gold medal – first place	1994 Malta	100m breaststroke SB6

Jesús Iglesias Cortés (born 25 December 1968 in Barcelona) is an S7 swimmer from Spain. He competed at the 1992 Summer Paralympics, and he won gold and silver medals in the freestyle and medley relay events, respectively. He also won one silver and three bronze medals in the freestyle and butterfly events. He competed at the 1996 Summer Paralympics, winning a gold medal in the 100 metre breaststroke, a silver in the 4 x 50 metre 20 points freestyle relay race, and a pair of bronze medals in the 50 metre S7 freestyle race and the 4 x 50 metre 20 points medley relay race. He is a World champion in the breaststroke.
