= Ana Bernardo (swimmer) =

Spanish swimmer

Personal information
- Full name: Ana Belén Bernardo Zamora
- Nationality: Spain
- Born: 20 March 1976 (age 50) Avilés, Spain

Sport
- Sport: Swimming
- Classifications: S10
Medal record
Women's swimming
Representing Spain
Paralympic Games
Silver medal – second place	1992 Barcelona	100 m butterfly S10
Bronze medal – third place	1992 Barcelona	400 m freestyle S10
Bronze medal – third place	1992 Barcelona	4×100 m medley S7–10
Bronze medal – third place	1996 Atlanta	100 m butterfly S10
Bronze medal – third place	1996 Atlanta	4×100 m medley S7–10
World Championships
Bronze medal – third place	1994 Malta	100 m butterfly S10

Ana Belén Bernardo Zamora (Note: In this Spanish name, the first or paternal surname is Bernardo and the second or maternal family name is Zamora.) (born 20 March 1976) is an S10 swimmer from Spain. She has a disability where she is missing or cannot use an arm or leg below the elbow or knee. She competed at the 1996 Summer Paralympics, winning a bronze medal in the 100 meter Butterfly race and in the 4 x 100 Relay swimming race. She finished 8th in the 100 meter Freestyle race, and fifth in the 400 meter Freestyle race.
