= Jorge Núñez (athlete) =

Spanish Paralympic athlete

Medal record

Paralympic athletics

Representing Spain

Paralympic Games
Gold medal – first place	1992 Barcelona	4x100m relay metres - B1>B3
Gold medal – first place	1996 Atlanta	4x100m relay - T10-12
Bronze medal – third place	1996 Atlanta	100 metres - T11

Jorge Núñez is a paralympic athlete from Spain competing mainly in category T12 sprint events.

Jorge was part of the Spanish visually disabled 4x100m relay team that won gold medals in both 1992 and 1996 Summer Paralympics. At both games he also competed in the individual 100m and 200m adding an individual bronze in the 100m in 1996.
