= José Manuel Rodríguez (athlete) =

Spanish Paralympic athlete (born 1966)

Personal information
- Full name: José Manuel Rodríguez Ibáñez
- Nickname: Manolo
- Born: 20 May 1966 (age 60) Madrid, Spain

Sport
- Country: Spain
- Sport: Para athletics (track & field)
- Disability class: F11
- Event(s): Long jump, Triple jump, 100 metres
Medal record
Paralympic Games
Gold medal – first place	1992 Barcelona	Triple jump - B1
Gold medal – first place	1996 Atlanta	Long jump - F10
Gold medal – first place	1996 Atlanta	Triple jump - F10
Gold medal – first place	2000 Sydney	Triple jump - F11
Silver medal – second place	1984 Stoke Mandeville / New York	Triple jump - B1
Silver medal – second place	1996 Atlanta	100 metres - T10
Silver medal – second place	2000 Sydney	Long jump - F11
Bronze medal – third place	1988 Seoul	Triple jump - B1
Bronze medal – third place	1992 Barcelona	100 metres - B1

José Manuel Rodríguez Ibáñez (Note: In this Spanish name, the first or paternal surname is Rodríguez and the second or maternal family name is Ibáñez.) (born 20 May 1966) is a paralympic athlete from Spain competing mainly in category F11 long and triple jump events.

Jose Manuel was part of the Spanish Paralympics every games from 1984 Summer Paralympics to 2004 Summer Paralympics winning medals at five of the games. His first medal came in 1984 when he won a silver medal in the triple jump as well as competing in the B1 category high jump. The following games led to a bronze medal in his only event, the B1 triple jump. The 1992 Summer Paralympics led to more medals a bronze in the 100m and his first gold medal in the triple jump as well as competing in the long jump. In the 1996 Summer Paralympics he again competed in the long and triple jump and won the gold medal in both as well as a silver in the 100m. Sydney hosted the 2000 Summer Paralympics which were to be Jose's fifth games leading to a third consecutive gold medal in the triple jump, a silver in the long jump as well as competing in the 100m. Jose's last games in 2004 were somewhat of a disappointment as despite competing in the long jump and triple jump he failed to win any further medals.
