= Juan António Prieto =

Spanish Paralympic athlete

Medal record

Paralympic athletics

Representing Spain

Paralympic Games
Gold medal – first place	1992 Barcelona	4x100 metre relay - B1-B3
Gold medal – first place	1992 Barcelona	4x400 metre relay - B1-B3
Gold medal – first place	1996 Atlanta	100 metres - T11
Gold medal – first place	1996 Atlanta	4x100 metre relay - T10-T12
Gold medal – first place	1996 Atlanta	4x400 metre relay - T10-T12
Silver medal – second place	1992 Barcelona	Pentathlon - B2
Silver medal – second place	1996 Atlanta	200 metres - T11
Bronze medal – third place	2000 Sydney	4x100 metre relay - T13

Juan Antonio Prieto is a paralympic athlete from Spain competing mainly in category T12 sprints events.

== Biography ==
Prieto has competed at three paralympics and won medals at all three. His first games were in 1992 in his home country where he competed in the 200m, 400m, high jump and triple jump he won a silver in the pentathlon and was part of both the 4 × 100 m and 4 × 400 m relay teams that won gold medals for Spain.

In the 1996 Summer Paralympics he won silver in the 200m and won gold in the 100m and was part of the Spanish relay teams that defended both the 4 × 100 m and 4 × 400 m gold medals. In his third Paralympics in 2000 he competed in the 100m and 200m and was part of the Spanish team that won bronze in the 4 × 100 m.
