= Enrique Agudo =

Spanish Paralympic table tennis player

Personal information
- Full name: Enrique Agudo Camacho
- Nationality: Spanish
- Born: 1 January 1967 (age 59) Tarragona, Spain

Sport
- Country: Spain
- Sport: Table tennis (class 10)
Medal record
Table tennis
Representing Spain
Paralympic Games
Bronze medal – third place	1996 Atlanta	Class 10 singles
Bronze medal – third place	2000 Sydney	Class 10 doubles

Enrique Agudo Camacho (Note: In this Spanish name, the first or paternal surname is Agudo and the second or maternal family name is Camacho.) (born 1 January 1967 in Tarragona) is a class 10 table tennis player from Spain. He played table tennis at the 1996, 2000 and 2004 Summer Paralympics. In 1996, he finished third in the men's class 10 singles event. In 2000, he finished third in the class 10 doubles event.
