= Roberto Abenia =

Spanish goalball player (born 1972)

Personal information
- Full name: Roberto Abenia Uliaque
- Nationality: Spanish
- Born: 8 November 1972 (age 53) Zaragoza, Spain

Sport
- Country: Spain
- Sport: Goalball
Medal record
Goalball
Representing Spain
Paralympic Games
Bronze medal – third place	1996 Atlanta	Men's team
Bronze medal – third place	2000 Sydney	Men's team

Roberto Abenia Uliaque (born 8 November 1972, in Zaragoza) is a goalball athlete from Spain. He played goalball at the 1996 Summer Paralympics. His team was third. He played goalball at the 2000 Summer Paralympics. His team was third. He played goalball at the 2004 Summer Paralympics. His team was six.
