= Goalball at the 2000 Summer Paralympics =

Goalball at the XI Paralympic Games
- Paralympic Goalball
- Venue: The Dome and Exhibition Complex
- Dates: 23-29 October 2000

Paralympic symbol (1994-2004)

Goalball at the 2000 Summer Paralympics consisted of men's and women's team events.

== Medal table ==
Rank	Nation	Gold	Silver	Bronze	Total
1	Canada (CAN)	1	0	0	1
1	Denmark (DEN)	1	0	0	1
3	Lithuania (LTU)	0	1	0	1
3	Spain (ESP)	0	1	0	1
5	Sweden (SWE)	0	0	2	2
Totals (5 entries)		2	2	2	6

== Medallists ==
Event	Gold	Silver	Bronze
Men's team	Denmark (DEN) Martin Enggaard Pedersen; Soren Jensen; Henri Nooyen; Ferudun Kahraman; Thomas Wetche; Peter Weichel	Lithuania (LTU) Marius Zibolis; Genrik Pavliukianec; Egidijus Biknevicius; Arvydas Juchna; Algirdas Montvydas	Sweden (SWE) Torsten Karlsson; Niklas Wetterstroem; Boris Samuelsson; Jimmy Bjoerkstrand; Niklas Hultqvist; Mikael Stahl
Women's team	Canada (CAN) Nancy Morin; Nathalie Chartrand; Viviane Forest; Contessa Scott; Amy Alsop; Carrie Anton	Spain (ESP) Sara Luna Santana; María Ángeles Calderón; Concepción Dueso Garcés; Concepción Hernández Díaz; Jessica Malagón Moreno; Maria Begoña Redal Giraldos	Sweden (SWE) Josefine Jaelmestal; Helena Gustavsson; Lena Saarensalo; Anna Nilsson; Malin Gustavsson; Sarah Winberg
