= Beatriz Mendoza =

Spanish Paralympic athlete

Medal record

Paralympic athletics

Representing Spain

Paralympic Games
Gold medal – first place	1996 Atlanta	100 metres - T11
Gold medal – first place	1996 Atlanta	200 metres - T11
Silver medal – second place	2000 Sydney	200 metres - T12
Bronze medal – third place	1992 Barcelona	100 metres - B2
Bronze medal – third place	1992 Barcelona	200 metres - B2
Bronze medal – third place	2000 Sydney	100 metres - T12

Beatriz Mendoza is a Paralympic athlete from Spain competing mainly in category T12 sprint events.

Beatriz was first part of the Spanish Paralympic games team at their home games in 1992 where she won bronze in the 100m and 200m. At the following games in Atlanta in 1996 she did the sprint double, winning gold in the 100m and 200m. Her third and final games were in Sydney in 2000 Summer Paralympics where again competing in the 100m and 200m she won bronze in the 100m and silver in the 200m.
