= Javier Conde (athlete) =

Spanish Paralympic athlete (born 1964)

Medal record

Paralympic athletics

Representing Spain

Paralympic Games
Gold medal – first place	1992 Barcelona	800 metres - TS4
Gold medal – first place	1992 Barcelona	1500 metres - TS4
Gold medal – first place	1992 Barcelona	5000 metres - TS4
Gold medal – first place	1992 Barcelona	10000 metres - TS4
Gold medal – first place	1996 Atlanta	5000 metres - T44-46
Gold medal – first place	1996 Atlanta	Marathon - T42-46
Gold medal – first place	2000 Sydney	Marathon - T46
Silver medal – second place	2000 Sydney	5000 metres - T46
Silver medal – second place	2004 Athens	5000 metres - T46

José Javier Conde Pujana (Note: In this Spanish name, the first or paternal surname is Conde and the second or maternal family name is Pujana.) (born 14 July 1964) is a paralympic athlete from Spain competing mainly in category T46 long-distance events.

Javier has competed in five Paralympics winning a total of seven gold and two silver medals. His first games were in front of his home crowd in Barcelona at the 1992 Summer Paralympics where he won gold in each of his four events, 800m, 1500m, 5000m and 10000m. He added a further two gold medals in Atlanta in 1996 in the 5000m and marathon but missed out on a medal in the 1500m. In 2000 he fell a little short of defending both titles when Robert De Friese Evans ran a world record to beat him in the 5000m but did defend his marathon gold. 2004 saw him compete in just the 5000m gaining his second consecutive silver medal in the event. His fifth games in Beijing in 2008 Summer Paralympics were the first time he failed to medal after finishing eleventh in the marathon.
