= Alfonso Fidalgo =

Spanish Paralympic athlete

Medal record

Paralympic athletics

Representing Spain

Paralympic Games
Gold medal – first place	1992 Barcelona	Discus Throw - B1
Gold medal – first place	1992 Barcelona	Shot Put - B1
Gold medal – first place	1996 Atlanta	Discus Throw - F10
Gold medal – first place	1996 Atlanta	Shot Put - F10
Gold medal – first place	2000 Sydney	Discus Throw - F11
Silver medal – second place	2000 Sydney	Shot Put - F11

Alfonso Fidalgo López (Note: In this Spanish name, the first or paternal surname is Fidalgo and the second or maternal family name is López.) (born 11 June 1969) is a paralympic athlete from Spain competing mainly in category F11 shot and discus events.

== Biography ==
Alfonso competed in three Paralympics, his first being in 1992 in his home country. There he competed in the B1 discus and shot winning gold in both. He repeated this performance in Atlanta in 1996 where he also competed in the pentathlon but finished outside the medals. The 2000 Summer Paralympics gave Alfonso his third consecutive gold medal in the discus but he was beaten in to silver by compatriot David Casinos
