= Juan Viedma (athlete) =

Spanish Paralympic athlete

Medal record

Paralympic athletics

Representing Spain

Paralympic Games
Gold medal – first place	1992 Barcelona	Triple Jump - B2
Gold medal – first place	1996 Atlanta	Triple Jump - F11
Silver medal – second place	1992 Barcelona	Long Jump - B2
Bronze medal – third place	1996 Atlanta	Long Jump - F11
Bronze medal – third place	2000 Sydney	4x100 metre relay - T13

Juan Viedma is a paralympic athlete from Spain competing mainly in category F11 long and triple jump events.

Juan has competed in four paralympics starting with his home games in Spain in 1992. He competed in the pentathlon and 100m before winning a silver in the long jump and gold in the triple jump. The following games in 1996 he defended his triple jump gold medal but could only manage bronze in the long jump. 2000 saw him fail to medal in either of the jumps but he was part of the bronze medal-winning 4 × 100 m relay team for Spain. He returned for a fourth games in 1996 where he competed in the long and triple jump but was unable to add any further medals.
