= José Antonio Sánchez =

Spanish Paralympic athlete

Medal record

Paralympic athletics

Representing Spain

Paralympic Games
Gold medal – first place	1992 Barcelona	4x400 metre relay - B1-B3
Gold medal – first place	1996 Atlanta	800 metres - T11
Gold medal – first place	1996 Atlanta	1500 metres - T11
Gold medal – first place	1996 Atlanta	4x400 metre relay - T10-T12
Silver medal – second place	1992 Barcelona	400 metres - B2
Silver medal – second place	1992 Barcelona	800 metres - B2
Bronze medal – third place	1992 Barcelona	1500 metres - B2

José Antonio Sánchez is a paralympic athlete from Spain competing mainly in category T11 800m events.

== Biography ==
Antonio competed in three Paralympics, winning a total of seven medals including four golds. His first games were his home games in 1992 in Barcelona where he won a bronze medal in the 1500m; a silver in the 800m in which Poland's Waldemar Kikolsji broke the games record; the 400m winning a second silver; and the 4 × 400 m relay, winning a gold as part of the world record breaking Spanish team. He competed in three events in Atlanta in 1996 where he was undefeated, winning gold medals as part of the Spanish 4 × 400 m relay team, in the 1500m and leading a Spanish 1,2,3 in the 800m. Unfortunately he only competed in the 400m at the 2000 Summer Paralympics and finished fourth in his heat and failed to make the final.

== See also ==
- Jose Sanchez
