= Great Britain at the 1992 Summer Paralympics =

- Flag of the United Kingdom
- IPC code: GBR
- NPC: British Paralympic Association
- Website: www.paralympics.org.uk

in Barcelona and Madrid
- Competitors: 209 in 15 sports
- Medals Ranked 3rd: Gold 42 Silver 51 Bronze 45 Total 138

Summer Paralympics appearances (overview)
- 1960; 1964; 1968; 1972; 1976; 1980; 1984; 1988; 1992; 1996; 2000; 2004; 2008; 2012; 2016; 2020; 2024

Great Britain competed at the 1992 Summer Paralympics in Barcelona, Spain. It finished third in the overall medal count, with a total of 128 medals. This list also includes also the medalists at 1992 Paralympic Games for Persons with mental handicap, which held by the same organizing committee, and is part of same event, but they were held in Madrid, between 15-22 September in the same year.

== Medalists ==
=== Gold medalists ===
Medal	Name	Sport	Event
Gold	Andrew Hodge	Athletics	Men's 100m TW3
Gold	Kenneth Colaine	Athletics	Men's 100m ID
Gold	Kenneth Colaine	Athletics	Men's 200m ID
Gold	Noel Thatcher	Athletics	Men's 1500m B2
Gold	John Nethercott	Athletics	Men's 1500m C7-8
Gold	Robert Matthews	Athletics	Men's 5000m B1
Gold	Stephen Brunt	Athletics	Men's marathon B2
Gold	Mark Farnell	Athletics	Men's marathon B3
Gold	Paul Williams	Athletics	Men's javelin throw C5
Gold	Michael Walker	Athletics	Men's shot put C3-4
Gold	Terence Hopkins	Athletics	Men's shot put THW5
Gold	Tracy McCollum	Athletics	Women's 100m C5-6
Gold	Tanni Grey	Athletics	Women's 100m TW3
Gold	Esther Cruice	Athletics	Women's 400m C7-8
Gold	Tanni Grey	Athletics	Women's 400m TW3
Gold	Tanni Grey	Athletics	Women's 800m TW3
Gold	Simon Jackson	Judo	Men's 71kg
Gold	Deanna Coates	Shooting	Mixed air rifle standing SH1-3
Gold	Peter Hull	Swimming	Men's 50m backstroke S2
Gold	Tommy Hunter	Swimming	Men's 50m backstroke S3
Gold	Christopher Holmes	Swimming	Men's 50m freestyle B2
Gold	Peter Hull	Swimming	Men's 50m freestyle S2
Gold	William McQueen	Swimming	Men's 50m freestyle S5
Gold	Christopher Holmes	Swimming	Men's 100m backstroke B2
Gold	Iain Mathew	Swimming	Men's 100m breaststroke SB8
Gold	David Moreton	Swimming	Men's 100m butterfly S10
Gold	Christopher Holmes	Swimming	Men's 100m freestyle B2
Gold	Peter Hull	Swimming	Men's 100m freestyle S2
Gold	Christopher Holmes	Swimming	Men's 200m backstroke B2
Gold	Christopher Holmes	Swimming	Men's 200m individual medley B2
Gold	Paul Noble	Swimming	Men's 200m individual medley SM10
Gold	Christopher Holmes	Swimming	Men's 400m freestyle B2
Gold	David Moreton	Swimming	Men's 400m freestyle S10
Gold	Tara Flood	Swimming	Women's 50m breaststroke SB2
Gold	Janice Burton	Swimming	Women's 50m freestyle B1
Gold	Clare Bishop	Swimming	Women's 50m freestyle S9
Gold	Janice Burton	Swimming	Women's 100m backstroke B1
Gold	Sarah Bailey	Swimming	Women's 100m backstroke S10
Gold	Janice Burton	Swimming	Women's 200m individual medley B1
Gold	Sarah Bailey	Swimming	Women's 200m individual medley SM10
Gold	Phillip Evans; James Rawson; Neil Robinson	Table tennis	Men's teams 3

=== Silver medalists ===
Medal	Name	Sport	Event
Silver	Paul Hughes	Athletics	Men's 100m C5
Silver	Nigel Coultas	Athletics	Men's 100m TS4
Silver	Nigel Coultas	Athletics	Men's 200m TS4
Silver	Nigel Coultas	Athletics	Men's 400m TS4
Silver	Robert Matthews	Athletics	Men's 800m B1
Silver	Mark Farnell	Athletics	Men's 5000m B3
Silver	Andrew Curtis; Robert Latham; Brinley Reynolds; Mark Whiteley	Athletics	Men's 4 × 100 m relay B1-B3
Silver	Peter Meechan; Colin James; James Barry; Kenneth Colaine	Athletics	Men's 4 × 100 m relay ID
Silver	Simon Butler; Andrew Curtis; Noel Thatcher; Mark Whiteley	Athletics	Men's 4 × 400 m relay B1-B3
Silver	Keith Gardner	Athletics	Men's club throw C6
Silver	Terence Hopkins	Athletics	Men's discus throw THW5
Silver	Shane Grenfell	Athletics	Men's javelin throw C5
Silver	Ian Hayden	Athletics	Men's javelin throw THW6
Silver	Jonathan Ward	Athletics	Men's shot put B3
Silver	Ian Hayden	Athletics	Men's shot put THW6
Silver	Esther Cruice	Athletics	Women's 100m C7-8
Silver	Tracey Hinton	Athletics	Women's 200m B1
Silver	Esther Cruice	Athletics	Women's 200m C7-8
Silver	Tracey Hinton	Athletics	Women's 400m B1
Silver	Sharon Bolton	Athletics	Women's 400m B3
Silver	Tanni Grey; Yvonne Holloway; Rosemary Hill; Tracy Lewis	Athletics	Women's 4 × 100 m relay TW3-4
Silver	Nicholas Slater	Powerlifting	Men's 90kg
Silver	James Anderson	Swimming	Men's 50m backstroke S2
Silver	James Anderson	Swimming	Men's 50m freestyle S2
Silver	Marc Woods	Swimming	Men's 100m backstroke S10
Silver	Paul Noble	Swimming	Men's 100m breaststroke SB9
Silver	Tim Reddish	Swimming	Men's 100m butterfly B1-2
Silver	Ian Sharpe	Swimming	Men's 100m butterfly B3
Silver	James Anderson	Swimming	Men's 100m freestyle S2
Silver	Tommy Hunter	Swimming	Men's 100m freestyle S3
Silver	Kenneth Cairns	Swimming	Men's 150m individual medley SM3
Silver	Paul Noble	Swimming	Men's 400m freestyle S10
Silver	Christopher Holmes	Swimming	Men's 400m individual medley B1-2
Silver	Beverley Gull	Swimming	Women's 50m freestyle S7
Silver	Clare Bishop	Swimming	Women's 100m backstroke S9
Silver	Margaret McEleny	Swimming	Women's 100m breaststroke SB3
Silver	Janice Burton	Swimming	Women's 100m butterfly B1
Silver	Janice Burton	Swimming	Women's 100m freestyle B1
Silver	Tara Flood	Swimming	Women's 100m freestyle S3-4
Silver	Clare Bishop	Swimming	Women's 100m freestyle S9
Silver	Janice Burton	Swimming	Women's 400m freestyle B1
Silver	Beverley Gull	Swimming	Women's 400m freestyle S7
Silver	Sarah Bailey	Swimming	Women's 400m freestyle S10
Silver	Susan Day; Libby MacFarland; Pamela Affleck; Maggie Simpson	Swimming	Women's 4 × 50 m freestyle ID
Silver	Susan Day; Gail Geddis; Pamela Affleck; Maggie Simpson	Swimming	Women's 4 × 50 m medley ID
Silver	Susan Day; Gail Geddis; Pamela Affleck; Maggie Simpson	Swimming	Women's 4 × 100 m medley ID
Silver	Janice Burton; Janice Danby; Judith Jones; Heather Millar	Swimming	Women's 4 × 100 m freestyle B1-3
Silver	Sarah Bailey; Clare Bishop; Beverley Gull; Victoria Sims	Swimming	Women's 4 × 100 m freestyle relay S7-10
Silver	Louise Byles; Janice Danby; Tracey Jones; Heather Millar	Swimming	Women's 4 × 100 m medley relay B1-3
Silver	Sarah Bailey; Clare Bishop; Beverley Gull; Victoria Sims	Swimming	Women's 4 × 100 m medley relay S7-10
Silver	Neil Robinson	Table tennis	Men's singles 3

=== Bronze medalists ===
Medal	Name	Sport	Event
Bronze	Chris Hallam	Athletics	Men's 100m TW3
Bronze	Stuart Braye	Athletics	Men's 400m TS2
Bronze	Noel Thatcher	Athletics	Men's 800m B2
Bronze	John Nethercott	Athletics	Men's 800m C7-8
Bronze	Robert Matthews	Athletics	Men's 1500m B1
Bronze	Anthony Hamilton	Athletics	Men's 1500m B3
Bronze	Robert Latham	Athletics	Men's long jump B1
Bronze	Robert Latham	Athletics	Men's triple jump B1
Bronze	Kevan Baker	Athletics	Men's discus throw THW6
Bronze	Ken Churchill	Athletics	Men's javelin throw C7
Bronze	David Plowright	Athletics	Men's javelin throw THW7
Bronze	Ernest Guild	Athletics	Men's shot put THW7
Bronze	Tracey Hinton	Athletics	Women's 100m B1
Bronze	Sharon Bolton	Athletics	Women's 100m B3
Bronze	Sharon Bolton	Athletics	Women's 200m B3
Bronze	Ethel Elaine Ord	Athletics	Women's shot put THW7
Bronze	Michael Murch	Judo	Men's 65kg
Bronze	Robert Cooper	Shooting	Men's air rifle standing SH1
Bronze	Kevin John Hyde	Shooting	Mixed air rifle 3x40m SH4
Bronze	John Campbell	Shooting	Mixed English Match SH1-3
Bronze	Alan McGregor	Swimming	Men's 50m backstroke S2
Bronze	Alan McGregor	Swimming	Men's 50m freestyle S2
Bronze	Tommy Hunter	Swimming	Men's 50m freestyle S3
Bronze	Paul Noble	Swimming	Men's 100m butterfly S10
Bronze	Tim Reddish	Swimming	Men's 100m freestyle B2
Bronze	Alan McGregor	Swimming	Men's 100m freestyle S2
Bronze	David Moreton	Swimming	Men's 100m freestyle S10
Bronze	Mark Butler; William McQueen; Andrew Stubbs; Kevin Walsh	Swimming	Men's 4x50m freestyle relay S1-6
Bronze	Tara Flood	Swimming	Women's 50m freestyle S3-4
Bronze	Dianne Barr	Swimming	Women's 100m backstroke S10
Bronze	Beverley Gull	Swimming	Women's 100m freestyle S7
Bronze	Sarah Bailey	Swimming	Women's 100m freestyle S10
Bronze	Tracey Jones	Swimming	Women's 200m backstroke B1-2
Bronze	Louise Byles	Swimming	Women's 200m individual medley B1
Bronze	Mary Ann Low	Swimming	Women's 400m freestyle B1
Bronze	Tracey Jones	Swimming	Women's 400m individual medley B1-3
Bronze	Jeanette Esling; Tara Flood; Margaret McEleny; Jane Stidever	Swimming	Women's 4x50m medley relay S1-6
Bronze	Arnie Chan	Table tennis	Men's singles 4
Bronze	David Hope; David Young	Table tennis	Men's teams 8
Bronze	Anthony Peddle	Weightlifting	Men's 52kg
Bronze	Jack Bradley; Kevin Davies; Brian Dickinson; David Heaton	Wheelchair fencing	Men's team sabre

=== Medals by sport ===
Medals by sport
Sport	Gold medal	Silver medal	Bronze medal	Total
Swimming	22	25	17	64
Athletics	15	20	16	51
Table tennis	1	1	2	4
Shooting	1	0	3	4
Judo	1	0	1	2
Powerlifting	0	1	0	1
Wheelchair Fencing	0	0	1	1
Weightlifting	0	0	1	1
Total	40	47	41	128

== See also ==
- Great Britain at the Paralympics
- Great Britain at the 1992 Summer Olympics
