= Swimming at the 2000 Summer Paralympics – Men's 200 metre individual medley SM7 =

Men's 200m individual medley SM7 at the XI Paralympic Games
- Paralympic Swimming
- Venue: Sydney International Aquatics Centre
- Dates: 20 October 2000

Medalists
1st place, gold medalist(s)		Eric Lindmann	France
2nd place, silver medalist(s)		Janos Becsey	Hungary
3rd place, bronze medalist(s)		Daniel Kuenzi	Switzerland

The men's 200m individual medley SM7 event took place on 20 October 2000 in Sydney, Australia.

== Results ==
=== Heat 1 ===
Rank	Athlete	Time	Notes
1	Eric Lindmann (FRA)	2:55.13	Q
2	Janos Becsey (HUN)	2:56.04	Q
3	Simon Ahlstad (SWE)	3:01.16	Q
4	Gledson Soares (BRA)	3:07.45	
5	Jozef Balicki (GER)	3:09.52	
6	Aaron Paulson (USA)	3:10.98	

=== Heat 2 ===
Rank	Athlete	Time	Notes
1	Daniel Kuenzi (SUI)	2:55.63	Q
2	Ritchie Barber (GBR)	3:02.03	Q
3	Mark Altmann (AUS)	3:02.12	Q
4	Bob Penner (CAN)	3:02.77	Q
5	Alex Harris (AUS)	3:05.67	Q
6	Sylvain Paillette (FRA)	3:15.59	

=== Final ===
Rank	Athlete	Time	Notes
1st place, gold medalist(s)	Eric Lindmann (FRA)	2:49.17	
2nd place, silver medalist(s)	Janos Becsey (HUN)	2:53.68	
3rd place, bronze medalist(s)	Daniel Kuenzi (SUI)	2:53.88	
4	Simon Ahlstad (SWE)	2:56.15	
5	Ritchie Barber (GBR)	2:58.86	
6	Alex Harris (AUS)	2:59.47	
7	Bob Penner (CAN)	3:00.63	
8	Mark Altmann (AUS)	3:01.09	
