= Archery at the 1992 Summer Paralympics – Men's individual open =

Men's individual open at the IX Paralympic Games
- Paralympic Archery
- Venue: Camp Olímpic de Tir amb Arc
- Dates: September 1992
- Competitors: 27 from 14 nations

Medalists
1st place, gold medalist(s)		Jens Fudge	Denmark
2nd place, silver medalist(s)		Kenichi Nishii	Japan
3rd place, bronze medalist(s)		Hyun Kwan Cho	South Korea

The Men's Individual Open was an archery competition in the 1992 Summer Paralympics.

Gold medalist, Jens Fudge, was the second Danish male archer to win a medal in the Paralympics, after Finn Larsen who won gold in 1980, as he defeated Japanese Kenichi Nishii in the final. The bronze medal match was won by Korean Hyun Kwan Cho.

== Results ==
=== Qualifying round ===
Rank	Archer	Points	Notes
1	Hyun Kwan Cho (KOR)	1190	
2	Veijo Viinikka (FIN)	1187	
3	Jens Fudge (DEN)	1186	
4	Kenichi Nishii (JPN)		
5	Marco Schreiner (LUX)		
6	Jan Thulin (SWE)		
7	Ezio Lovisetto (ITA)		
8	Antonio Rebollo (ESP)		
9	Raimo Tirronen (FIN)		
10	Sung Hee Kim (KOR)		
11	Mario Esposito (ITA)		
12	Stepan Bugaychuk (IPP)		
13	Jean-Michel Favre (FRA)		
14	Hak Young Lee (KOR)		
15	Konstantine Shumkov (IPP)		
16	Jean Francois Garcia (FRA)		
17	Dmitri Nikolsky (IPP)		
18	Thomas Darkins (GBR)		
19	Manfred Boeckers (GER)		
20	Robert Anderson (GBR)		
21	Jose Fernandez (ESP)		
22	Carroll Walker (USA)		
23	Carmelo Scalisi (BEL)		
24	Jose Luis Hermosin (ESP)		
25	Hilmar Butenhoff (GER)		
25	Walfried Niedersberg (GER)		
27	Rene Le Bras (FRA)		

=== Finals ===
Quarter-finals
1	Hyun Kwan Cho (KOR)	102
8	Antonio Rebollo (ESP)	98
5	Marco Schreiner (LUX)	103
4	Kenichi Nishii (JPN)	106
3	Jens Fudge (DEN)	100
6	Jan Thulin (SWE)	89
7	Ezio Lovisetto (ITA)	88
2	Veijo Viinikka (FIN)	90

Semi-finals
1	Hyun Kwan Cho (KOR)	98
4	Kenichi Nishii (JPN)	104
3	Jens Fudge (DEN)	97
2	Veijo Viinikka (FIN)	92

Gold medal match
4	Kenichi Nishii (JPN)	100
3	Jens Fudge (DEN)	103
Bronze medal match
1	Hyun Kwan Cho (KOR)	106
2	Veijo Viinikka (FIN)	98
