= Swimming at the 1992 Summer Paralympics =

Swimming at the IX Paralympic Games
- Paralympic Swimming
- Venue: Piscines Bernat Picornell
- Dates: 4 to 13 September 1992

Paralympic symbol (1988-1994)

Swimming at the 1992 Summer Paralympics consisted of 163 events, 88 for men and 75 for women. Because of ties for third place in the women's 50 metre freestyle B3 and men's 50 metre freestyle B2 events, a total of 165 bronze medals were awarded.

Starting in 1992, there was a move away from Les Autres specific classifications to functional based classification systems at the Paralympic Games. This was realized in swimming, where Les Autres sportspeople competed directly against people with other disabilities including cerebral palsy, spinal cord injuries and amputations. As a result, the 1992 Games saw the total number of classes for people with physical disabilities drop from 31 to 10. Still, swimming, athletics and table tennis used a classification system for the Barcelona Games that was still mostly medical based.

This medal table includes also the 1992 Paralympic Games for Persons with mental handicap, which held by the same organizing committee, and is part of same event, but in Madrid, between 15 and 22 September in the same year.

== Medal table ==
Rank	Nation	Gold	Silver	Bronze	Total
1	United States (USA)	29	16	12	57
2	Great Britain (GBR)	22	27	19	68
3	Australia (AUS)	21	19	19	59
4	Germany (GER)	20	13	13	46
5	France (FRA)	17	13	12	42
6	Norway (NOR)	13	10	3	26
7	Iceland (ISL)	13	8	16	37
8	Canada (CAN)	10	5	9	24
9	Sweden (SWE)	8	23	12	43
10	Spain (ESP)	7	14	24	45
11	Unified Team (EUN)	7	3	5	15
12	Denmark (DEN)	5	9	9	23
13	Netherlands (NED)	4	8	5	17
14	New Zealand (NZL)	4	1	0	5
15	Hungary (HUN)	3	2	2	7
16	China (CHN)	3	1	3	7
17	Romania (ROM)	3	1	0	4
18	Poland (POL)	2	4	2	8
19	Finland (FIN)	2	1	4	7
20	Italy (ITA)	2	0	1	3
21	Argentina (ARG)	1	3	2	6
22	Independent Paralympic Participants (IPP)	1	1	0	2
23	Egypt (EGY)	1	0	2	3
24	South Africa (RSA)	1	0	0	1
25	Israel (ISR)	0	3	5	8
26	Japan (JPN)	0	2	4	6
27	Switzerland (SUI)	0	1	4	5
27	Uruguay (URU)	0	1	4	5
29	Belgium (BEL)	0	1	1	2
29	Estonia (EST)	0	1	1	2
31	Cuba (CUB)	0	1	0	1
31	Faroe Islands (FRO)	0	1	0	1
31	Ireland (IRL)	0	1	0	1
34	Brazil (BRA)	0	0	3	3
35	Mexico (MEX)	0	0	2	2
36	Portugal (POR)	0	0	1	1
Totals (36 entries)		199	194	199	592

=== Participating nations ===
- Argentina (2)
- Australia (27)
- Austria (1)
- Belgium (4)
- Brazil (13)
- Canada (23)
- Chile (1)
- China (7)
- Chinese Taipei (2)
- Colombia (2)
- Croatia (3)
- Cuba (4)
- Cyprus (2)
- Denmark (14)
- Egypt (3)
- Estonia (3)
- Faroe Islands (2)
- Finland (4)
- France (19)
- Germany (34)
- Great Britain (45)
- Greece (1)
- Hungary (8)
- Iceland (9)
- Independent Paralympic Participants (2)
- Ireland (4)
- Israel (11)
- Italy (10)
- Jamaica (1)
- Japan (10)
- Kenya (1)
- Kuwait (2)
- Luxembourg (1)
- Malaysia (2)
- Mexico (3)
- Morocco (3)
- Netherlands (12)
- New Zealand (3)
- Norway (10)
- Pakistan (1)
- Poland (9)
- Portugal (6)
- Seychelles (1)
- Slovenia (1)
- South Africa (2)
- South Korea (3)
- Spain (52)
- Sweden (18)
- Switzerland (3)
- Syria (1)
- Thailand (1)
- Unified Team (11)
- United States (66)
- Venezuela (2)
- Yemen (1)

== Medal summary ==
=== Men's events ===
Event	Gold	Silver	Bronze
50 m backstroke S2	Peter Hull; Great Britain	James Anderson; Great Britain	Alan McGregor; Great Britain
50 m backstroke S3	Tommy Hunter; Great Britain	Jean-Louis Flamengo; France	Genezi Alves; Brazil
50 m backstroke S4	Pierre Bellot; France	Thierry Grand; France	Albert Bakaev; Unified Team
50 m backstroke S5	Zsolt Vereczkei; Hungary	Krzysztof Sleczka; Poland	Pascal Pinard; France
50 m breaststroke SB2	Nenad Krisanovic; Independent Paralympic Participants	Lars Luerig; Germany	James Thompson; United States
50 m butterfly S3–4	Pierre Bellot; France	Nenad Krisanovic; Independent Paralympic Participants	Eduardo Wanderley; Brazil
50 m butterfly S5	Pascal Pinard; France	Thierry le Gloanic; France	Javier Torres; Spain
50 m butterfly S6	David Foppolo; France	Peter Lund; Denmark	Jesus Iglesias; Spain
50 m butterfly S7	Omar Abd Ellatif; Egypt	Joop Stokkel; Netherlands	Daniel Kunzi; Switzerland
50 m freestyle B1	John Morgan; United States	Junichi Kawai; Japan	Izhar Cohen; Israel
50 m freestyle B2	Christopher Holmes; Great Britain	Pablo Corral; Spain	Kingsley Bugarin; Australia
50 m freestyle B2	Christopher Holmes; Great Britain	Pablo Corral; Spain	Fredrik Nasman; Sweden
50 m freestyle B3	Vladimir Chesnov; Unified Team	Noel Pedersen; Norway	Flemming Berthelsen; Denmark
50 m freestyle S2	Peter Hull; Great Britain	James Anderson; Great Britain	Alan McGregor; Great Britain
50 m freestyle S3	Jean-Louis Flamengo; France	Jordi Pascual; Spain	Tommy Hunter; Great Britain
50 m freestyle S4	Pierre Bellot; France	Gene Viens; United States	Pau Marc Munoz; Spain
50 m freestyle S5	William McQueen; Great Britain	Krzysztof Sleczka; Poland	Pascal Pinard; France
50 m freestyle S6	Peter Lund; Denmark	Jesus Iglesias; Spain	Kevin Sullivan; United States
50 m freestyle S7	Janos Becsey; Hungary	Daniel Kunzi; Switzerland	Omar Abd Ellatif; Egypt
50 m freestyle S8	Johan Siqveland; Norway	Erling Trondsen; Norway	Holger Kimmig; Germany
50 m freestyle S9	Donnie Keller; United States	Hanoch Budin; Israel	Brendan Burkett; Australia
50 m freestyle S10	Gianluca Saini; Italy	Ernesto Garrido; Cuba	Jochen Hahnengress; Germany
100 m backstroke B1	John Morgan; United States	Daniel Kelly; United States	Junichi Kawai; Japan
100 m backstroke B2	Christopher Holmes; Great Britain	Ziv Better; Israel	Wieslaw Krol; Poland
100 m backstroke B3	Michael Edgson; Canada	Noel Pedersen; Norway	Kieran Modra; Australia
100 m backstroke S6	David Foppolo; France	Peter Lund; Denmark	Matthias Schlubeck; Germany
100 m backstroke S7	Joop Stokkel; Netherlands	Eric Lindmann; France	Frederic Delpy; France
100 m backstroke S8	Geert Jaehrig; Germany	Holger Kimmig; Germany	Kasper Hansen; Denmark
100 m backstroke S9	Helge Bjoernstad; Norway	Detlef Schmidt; Germany	Fredy Widmer; Switzerland
100 m backstroke S10	Alwin de Groot; Netherlands	Marc Woods; Great Britain	Eran Shemesh; Israel
100 m breaststroke B1	Christian Bundgaard; Denmark	John Morgan; United States	Jordi Mari; Spain
100 m breaststroke B2	Vitalii Krylov; Unified Team	Kingsley Bugarin; Australia	Jose Pedrajas; Spain
100 m breaststroke B3	Noel Pedersen; Norway	Ivan Nielsen; Denmark	Flemming Berthelsen; Denmark
100 m breaststroke SB3	Bernd Eickemeyer; Germany	John Petersson; Denmark	Javier Torres; Spain
100 m breaststroke SB4	Pascal Pinard; France	Gregory Burns; United States	Arkadiusz Pawlowski; Poland
100 m breaststroke SB5	Tadhg Slattery; South Africa	Cornelis Engel; Netherlands	Eric Lindmann; France
100 m breaststroke SB6	Matthias Schlubeck; Germany	Simon Ahlstad; Sweden	Juan Castane; Spain
100 m breaststroke SB7	Joop Stokkel; Netherlands	Laurentius van Geel; Netherlands	Janos Becsey; Hungary
100 m breaststroke SB8	Iain Mathew; Great Britain	Holger Woelk; Germany	Jan-Marcin Miroslaw; Germany
100 m breaststroke SB9	Geir Sverrisson; Iceland	Paul Noble; Great Britain	Rutger Sturkenboom; Netherlands
100 m breaststroke SB10	Jochen Hahnengress; Germany	Stefan Loeffler; Germany	Nikolay Rogozhin; Unified Team
100 m butterfly B1–2	John Morgan; United States	Tim Reddish; Great Britain	Pablo Corral; Spain
100 m butterfly B3	Michael Edgson; Canada	Ian Sharpe; Great Britain	Vladimir Chesnov; Unified Team
100 m butterfly S8	Erling Trondsen; Norway	Zebing Liu; China	Moises Galindo; Mexico
100 m butterfly S9	Olafur Eiriksson; Iceland	Aleksei Kapoura; Unified Team	Fredy Widmer; Switzerland
100 m butterfly S10	David Moreton; Great Britain	Jason Diederich; Australia	Paul Noble; Great Britain
100 m freestyle B1	John Morgan; United States	Junichi Kawai; Japan	Daniel Kelly; United States
100 m freestyle B2	Christopher Holmes; Great Britain	Pablo Corral; Spain	Tim Reddish; Great Britain
100 m freestyle B3	Vladimir Chesnov; Unified Team	Flemming Berthelsen; Denmark	Noel Pedersen; Norway
100 m freestyle S2	Peter Hull; Great Britain	James Anderson; Great Britain	Alan McGregor; Great Britain
100 m freestyle S3	Jean-Louis Flamengo; France	Tommy Hunter; Great Britain	Jordi Pascual; Spain
100 m freestyle S4	Pierre Bellot; France	Pau Marc Munoz; Spain	Stig Morten Sandvik; Norway
100 m freestyle S5	Pascal Pinard; France	Krzysztof Sleczka; Poland	Roberto Valori; Italy
100 m freestyle S6	Peter Lund; Denmark	Kevin Sullivan; United States	Jesus Iglesias; Spain
100 m freestyle S7	Janos Becsey; Hungary	Frederic Delpy; France	Eric Lindmann; France
100 m freestyle S8	Johan Siqveland; Norway	Erling Trondsen; Norway	Holger Kimmig; Germany
100 m freestyle S9	Holger Woelk; Germany	Donnie Keller; United States	Olafur Eiriksson; Iceland
100 m freestyle S10	Gianluca Saini; Italy	Alwin de Groot; Netherlands	David Moreton; Great Britain
150 m individual medley SM3	Jean-Louis Flamengo; France	Kenneth Cairns; Great Britain	Jordi Pascual; Spain
150 m individual medley SM4	Krzysztof Sleczka; Poland	Javier Torres; Spain	John Petersson; Denmark
200 m backstroke B1	John Morgan; United States	Daniel Kelly; United States	Junichi Kawai; Japan
200 m backstroke B2	Christopher Holmes; Great Britain	Juan Diego Gil; Spain	Ziv Better; Israel
200 m backstroke B3	Noel Pedersen; Norway	Michael Edgson; Canada	Kieran Modra; Australia
200 m breaststroke B1	Christian Bundgaard; Denmark	John Morgan; United States	Daniel Kelly; United States
200 m breaststroke B2	Vitalii Krylov; Unified Team	Kingsley Bugarin; Australia	Jose Pedrajas; Spain
200 m breaststroke B3	Noel Pedersen; Norway	Ivan Nielsen; Denmark	Flemming Berthelsen; Denmark
200 m freestyle S6	Peter Lund; Denmark	Jeremy Gervan; Canada	Jesus Iglesias; Spain
200 m individual medley B1	John Morgan; United States	Daniel Kelly; United States	Junichi Kawai; Japan
200 m individual medley B2	Christopher Holmes; Great Britain	Kingsley Bugarin; Australia	Pablo Corral; Spain
200 m individual medley B3	Michael Edgson; Canada	Noel Pedersen; Norway	Andreas Strand; Norway
200 m individual medley SM5	Pascal Pinard; France	Peter Lund; Denmark	Ivanildo Alves; Brazil
200 m individual medley SM6	Eric Lindmann; France	Sebastian Xhrouet; Belgium	Roger Vial; Spain
200 m individual medley SM7	Joop Stokkel; Netherlands	Simon Ahlstad; Sweden	Daniel Kunzi; Switzerland
200 m individual medley SM8	Jason Wening; United States	Erling Trondsen; Norway	Moises Galindo; Mexico
200 m individual medley SM9	Helge Bjoernstad; Norway	Aleksei Kapoura; Unified Team	Olafur Eiriksson; Iceland
200 m individual medley SM10	Paul Noble; Great Britain	Alwin de Groot; Netherlands	Stephen Simmonds; Australia
400 m freestyle B1	John Morgan; United States	Daniel Kelly; United States	Birkir Gunnarsson; Iceland
400 m freestyle B2	Christopher Holmes; Great Britain	Ziv Better; Israel	Daniel Llambrich; Spain
400 m freestyle B3	Andreas Strand; Norway	Flemming Berthelsen; Denmark	Ivan Nielsen; Denmark
400 m freestyle S7	Eric Lindmann; France	Frederic Delpy; France	Omar Abd Ellatif; Egypt
400 m freestyle S8	Jason Wening; United States	Johan Siqveland; Norway	Holger Kimmig; Germany
400 m freestyle S9	Olafur Eiriksson; Iceland	Helge Bjoernstad; Norway	Andrew Haley; Canada
400 m freestyle S10	David Moreton; Great Britain	Paul Noble; Great Britain	Alwin de Groot; Netherlands
400 m individual medley B1–2	John Morgan; United States	Christopher Holmes; Great Britain	Ziv Better; Israel
400 m individual medley B3	Michael Edgson; Canada	Noel Pedersen; Norway	Vladimir Chesnov; Unified Team
4×50 m freestyle relay S1–6	Spain (ESP); Juan Fuertes; Javier Torres; Roger Vial; Jesus Iglesias	France (FRA); Pascal Pinard; Eric Lindmann; Thierry le Gloanic; David Foppolo	Great Britain (GBR); William McQueen; Mark Butler; Andrew Stubbs; Kevin Walsh
4×50 m medley relay S1–6	France (FRA); Thierry le Gloanic; Eric Lindmann; David Foppolo; Pascal Pinard	Spain (ESP); Juan Fuertes; Javier Torres; Juan Castane; Jesus Iglesias	United States (USA); Gary Bogue; Gregory Burns; Daniel Butler; Kevin Sullivan
4 × 100 m freestyle relay S7–10	United States (USA); Mark Whitlock; Jason Wening; Michael Doyle; Donnie Keller	Germany (GER); Holger Woelk; Jochen Hahnengress; Holger Kimmig; Raimund Patzelt	Israel (ISR); Hanoch Budin; Shalom Ayger; Shlomo Pinard; Eran Shemesh
4 × 100 m medley relay S7–10	Germany (GER); Geert Jaehrig; Jochen Hahnengress; Detlef Schmidt; Holger Woelk	Netherlands (NED); Rutger Sturkenboom; Andre van Buiten; Joop Stokkel; Alwin de Groot	United States (USA); Donnie Keller; Jason Wening; Mark Whitlock; Michael Doyle

=== Women's events ===
Event	Gold	Silver	Bronze
50 m backstroke S2	Sonia Guirado; Spain	Mairead Berry; Ireland	Sandrine Serres; France
50 m backstroke S3–4	Arancha Gonzalez; Spain	M. Paz Monserrat; Spain	Susana Carvalheira; Portugal
50 m backstroke S5	Jenny Newstead; New Zealand	Ritva Nikkila; Finland	Anne Cecile Lequien; France
50 m breaststroke SB2	Tara Flood; Great Britain	Regina Cachan; Spain	Frouwkje Harkema; Netherlands
50 m butterfly S3–4	Tracy Barrell; Australia	Regina Cachan; Spain	Jaenette Bouma; Netherlands
50 m butterfly S5	Sanna Huttunen; Finland	Genevieve Pairoux; France	Anne-Dorte Andersen; Denmark
50 m butterfly S6	Beate Schretzmann; Germany	Katalin Engelhardt; Hungary	Diana Zambo; Hungary
50 m butterfly S7	Eva Nesheim; Norway	Gerda Lampers; Netherlands	Nora Bednarski; Canada
50 m freestyle B1	Janice Burton; Great Britain	Yvette Weicker; Canada	Eeva Riitta Fingerroos; Finland
50 m freestyle B2	Trischa Zorn; United States	Marge Kõrkjas; Estonia	Danae Sweetapple; Australia
50 m freestyle B3	Elizabeth Scott; United States	Yvonne Hopf; Germany	Marie Claire Ross; Canada
50 m freestyle B3	Elizabeth Scott; United States	Yvonne Hopf; Germany	Heidi Schetter; United States
50 m freestyle S2	Liv Tone Lind; Norway	Sandrine Serres; France	Sonia Guirado; Spain
50 m freestyle S3–4	Arancha Gonzalez; Spain	M. Paz Monserrat; Spain	Tara Flood; Great Britain
50 m freestyle S5	Jenny Newstead; New Zealand	Genevieve Pairoux; France	Sanna Huttunen; Finland
50 m freestyle S6	Lena-Marie Hagman; Sweden	Camille Waddell; United States	Anne Currie; Australia
50 m freestyle S7	Daniela Pohl; Germany	Beverley Gull; Great Britain	Tracey Oliver; Australia
50 m freestyle S8	Priya Cooper; Australia	Britta Siegers; Germany	Brenda Smith; United States
50 m freestyle S9	Clare Bishop; Great Britain	Beate Lobenstein; Germany	Lilja Snorradottir; Iceland
50 m freestyle S10	Claudia Hengst; Germany	Judith Young; Australia	Karen Norris; United States
100 m backstroke B1	Janice Burton; Great Britain	Tracey Cross; Australia	Eeva Riitta Fingerroos; Finland
100 m backstroke B2	Trischa Zorn; United States	Gabriella Tjernberg; Sweden	Danae Sweetapple; Australia
100 m backstroke B3	Elizabeth Scott; United States	Yvonne Hopf; Germany	Rut Sverrisdottir; Iceland
100 m backstroke S6	Xiangrong Zhou; China	Lena-Marie Hagman; Sweden	Corinne D'Urzo; France
100 m backstroke S7	Daniela Pohl; Germany	Edyta Okoczuk; Poland	M. Therese Crespo; France
100 m backstroke S8	Britta Siegers; Germany	Priya Cooper; Australia	Kristin Hakonardottir; Iceland
100 m backstroke S9	Jacqueline Nannenberg; Netherlands	Clare Bishop; Great Britain	Lilja Snorradottir; Iceland
100 m backstroke S10	Sarah Bailey; Great Britain	Claudia Hengst; Germany	Dianne Barr; Great Britain
100 m breaststroke B1–2	Trischa Zorn; United States	Gabriella Tjernberg; Sweden	Carine van Puyvelde; Belgium
100 m breaststroke B3	Mandy Maywood; Australia	Marie Claire Ross; Canada	Natalia Parshina; Unified Team
100 m breaststroke SB3	Genevieve Pairoux; France	Margaret McEleny; Great Britain	Michiko Katagiri; Japan
100 m breaststroke SB4	Outi Hokkanen; Sweden	Jenny Newstead; New Zealand	Ana Martin; Spain
100 m breaststroke SB5	Camille Waddell; United States	Gerda Lampers; Netherlands	Jody Houston; United States
100 m breaststroke SB6–7	Britta Siegers; Germany	Heidi Kopp; Germany	Beate Schretzmann; Germany
100 m breaststroke SB8	Joanne Mucz; Canada	Aniko Laki; Hungary	Tieyin Shi; China
100 m breaststroke SB9	Begona Reina; Spain	Kristina Brokholc; Sweden	Beate Lobenstein; Germany
100 m butterfly B1	Eeva Riitta Fingerroos; Finland	Janice Burton; Great Britain	Xue Zhou; China
100 m butterfly B2–3	Elizabeth Scott; United States	Trischa Zorn; United States	Yvonne Hopf; Germany
100 m butterfly S8	Laura Tramuns; Spain	Silvia Vives; Spain	Asa Wilhelmsson; Sweden
100 m butterfly S9	Joanne Mucz; Canada	Kelly Barnes; Australia	Lilja Snorradottir; Iceland
100 m butterfly S10	Claudia Hengst; Germany	Ana Bernardo; Spain	Judith Young; Australia
100 m freestyle B1	Tracey Cross; Australia	Janice Burton; Great Britain	Eeva Riitta Fingerroos; Finland
100 m freestyle B2	Trischa Zorn; United States	Danae Sweetapple; Australia	Marge Kõrkjas; Estonia
100 m freestyle B3	Elizabeth Scott; United States	Heidi Schetter; United States	Yvonne Hopf; Germany
100 m freestyle S2	Liv Tone Lind; Norway	Sandrine Serres; France	Sonia Guirado; Spain
100 m freestyle S3–4	Arancha Gonzalez; Spain	Tara Flood; Great Britain	M. Paz Monserrat; Spain
100 m freestyle S5	Jenny Newstead; New Zealand	Anne-Dorte Andersen; Denmark	Genevieve Pairoux; France
100 m freestyle S6	Anne Currie; Australia	Lena-Marie Hagman; Sweden	Sandra Yaxley; Australia
100 m freestyle S7	Daniela Pohl; Germany	Eva Nesheim; Norway	Beverley Gull; Great Britain
100 m freestyle S8	Priya Cooper; Australia	Britta Siegers; Germany	Rebeccah Bornemann; Canada
100 m freestyle S9	Joanne Mucz; Canada	Clare Bishop; Great Britain	Lilja Snorradottir; Iceland
100 m freestyle S10	Claudia Hengst; Germany	Tora Vid Keldu; Faroe Islands	Sarah Bailey; Great Britain
200 m backstroke B1–2	Trischa Zorn; United States	Gabriella Tjernberg; Sweden	Tracey Jones; Great Britain
200 m breaststroke B1–3	Trischa Zorn; United States	Natalia Parshina; Unified Team	Mandy Maywood; Australia
200 m freestyle S6	Anne Currie; Australia	Lena-Marie Hagman; Sweden	Xiangrong Zhou; China
200 m individual medley B1	Janice Burton; Great Britain	Tracey Cross; Australia	Louise Byles; Great Britain
200 m individual medley B2	Trischa Zorn; United States	Gabriella Tjernberg; Sweden	Olga Melnikova; Unified Team
200 m individual medley B3	Yvonne Hopf; Germany	Heidi Schetter; United States	Rut Sverrisdottir; Iceland
200 m individual medley SM5	Jenny Newstead; New Zealand	Outi Hokkanen; Sweden	Anne-Dorte Andersen; Denmark
200 m individual medley SM6–7	Priya Cooper; Australia	Hadda Guerchouche; France	Lena-Marie Hagman; Sweden
200 m individual medley SM8	Britta Siegers; Germany	Kristin Hakonardottir; Iceland	Heidi Kopp; Germany
200 m individual medley SM9	Joanne Mucz; Canada	Kelly Barnes; Australia	Beate Lobenstein; Germany
200 m individual medley SM10	Sarah Bailey; Great Britain	Claudia Hengst; Germany	Judith Young; Australia
400 m freestyle B1	Tracey Cross; Australia	Janice Burton; Great Britain	Mary Ann Low; Great Britain
400 m freestyle B2–3	Elizabeth Scott; United States	Trischa Zorn; United States	Heidi Schetter; United States
400 m freestyle S7	Eva Nesheim; Norway	Beverley Gull; Great Britain	Aicha Chouachi; France
400 m freestyle S8	Britta Siegers; Germany	Priya Cooper; Australia	Rebeccah Bornemann; Canada
400 m freestyle S9	Joanne Mucz; Canada	Lilja Snorradottir; Iceland	Carolina Saenz; United States
400 m freestyle S10	Claudia Hengst; Germany	Sarah Bailey; Great Britain	Ana Bernardo; Spain
400 m individual medley B1–3	Trischa Zorn; United States	Heidi Schetter; United States	Tracey Jones; Great Britain
4×50 m freestyle relay S1–6	Australia (AUS); Sandra Yaxley; Tracy Barrell; Catherine Huggett; Anne Currie	Sweden (SWE); Lena-Marie Hagman; Outi Hokkanen; Pernilla Nilsson; Anne-Lie Osterstrom	France (FRA); Corinne D'Urzo; Anne Cecile Lequien; Aicha Chouachi; Genevieve Pairoux
4×50 m medley relay S1–6	Sweden (SWE); Anne-Lie Osterstrom; Marie-Louise Freij; Outi Hokkanen; Lena-Marie Hagman	France (FRA); Anne Cecile Lequien; Genevieve Pairoux; Aicha Chouachi; Corinne D'Urzo	Great Britain (GBR); Tara Flood; Jeanette Esling; Margaret McEleny; Jane Stidever
4 × 100 m freestyle relay B1–3	United States (USA); Trischa Zorn; Heidi Schetter; Donna Brown; Elizabeth Scott	Great Britain (GBR); Janice Danby; Heather Millar; Judith Jones; Janice Burton	Canada (CAN); Carla Qualtrough; Nancy Irvine; Yvette Weicker; Marie Claire Ross
4 × 100 m freestyle relay S7–10	United States (USA); Brenda Smith; Diane Straub; Carolina Saenz; Karen Norris	Great Britain (GBR); Sarah Bailey; Victoria Sims; Beverley Gull; Clare Bishop	Germany (GER); Claudia Hengst; Daniela Sjoberg; Beate Lobenstein; Britta Siegers
4 × 100 m medley relay B1–3	United States (USA); Trischa Zorn; Elizabeth Scott; Heidi Schetter; Donna Brown	Great Britain (GBR); Heather Millar; Janice Danby; Louise Byles; Tracey Jones	Canada (CAN); Nancy Irvine; Carla Qualtrough; Marie Claire Ross; Yvette Weicker
4 × 100 m medley relay S7–10	Germany (GER); Britta Siegers; Beate Lobenstein; Claudia Hengst; Daniela Sjoberg	Great Britain (GBR); Beverley Gull; Clare Bishop; Sarah Bailey; Victoria Sims	Spain (ESP); Silvia Vives; Begona Reina; Ana Bernardo; Tania Cerda
