= Britta Siegers =

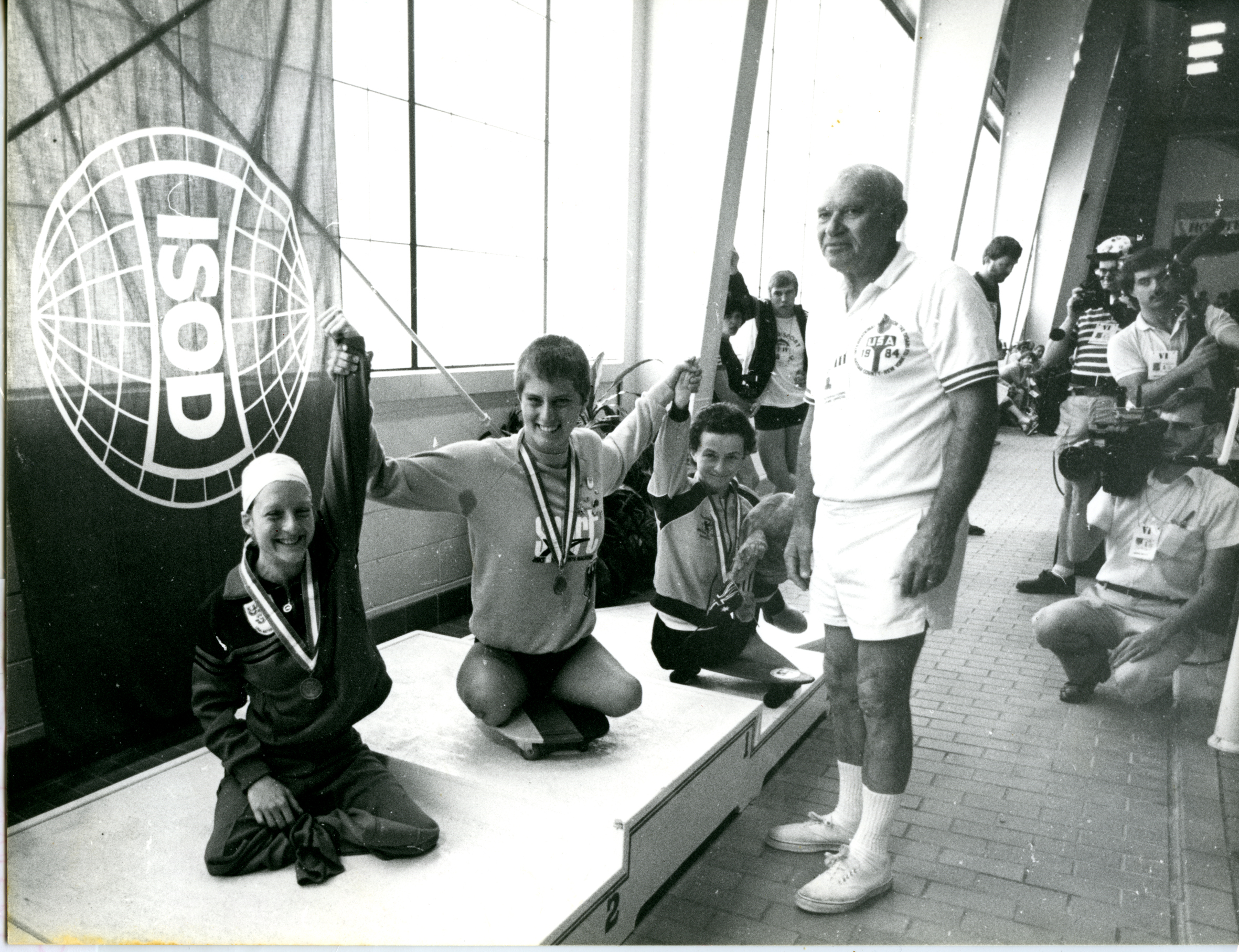
- Siegers (centre) at a medal ceremony at the 1984 Summer Paralympics

Personal information
- Born: 4 July 1966 (age 59) Bergisch-Gladbach, West Germany

Sport
- Country: Germany
- Sport: Paralympic swimming Wheelchair tennis
Medal record
Women's swimming
Representing Germany
Paralympic Games
Gold medal – first place	1984 New York /Stoke Mandeville	100m freestyle A1
Gold medal – first place	1984 New York /Stoke Mandeville	100m backstroke A1
Gold medal – first place	1988 Seoul	100m backstroke L4
Gold medal – first place	1992 Barcelona	100m backstroke S8
Gold medal – first place	1992 Barcelona	400m freestyle S8
Gold medal – first place	1992 Barcelona	100m breaststroke SB6-7
Gold medal – first place	1992 Barcelona	200m individual medley SM8
Gold medal – first place	1992 Barcelona	4x100m medley S7-10
Silver medal – second place	1984 New York /Stoke Mandeville	100m breaststroke A1
Silver medal – second place	1988 Seoul	100m freestyle L4
Silver medal – second place	1992 Barcelona	50m freestyle S8
Silver medal – second place	1992 Barcelona	100m freestyle S8
Bronze medal – third place	1992 Barcelona	4x100m freestyle S7-10

Britta Siegers (born 4 July 1966) is a retired German wheelchair tennis player and Paralympic swimmer who competed in international level events. She was the first German disabled athlete to compete in two different sports at the Paralympics: she was a swimmer from 1984 to 1992 and returned twelve years later as a wheelchair tennis player at the 2004 Summer Paralympics.

== Swimming career ==
Siegers' first sport was swimming when she started in 1969 after she lost both of her legs in a train accident aged two years old. She swam competitively in 1984 at the Summer Paralympics and won her first medals there. Her most successful Paralympic Games was in 1992 where she won five gold medals, two silvers and one bronze medal, she narrowly missed winning her consecutive freestyle titles after being beaten by Priya Cooper in both the 50m and 100m freestyle S8.

== Tennis career ==
Siegers began playing wheelchair tennis in the early 1994 after her retirement to swimming in 1992. She won seven singles titles and eleven doubles titles and her highest ranking was World No. 8 in July 2003, she competed at her fourth and last Summer Paralympics Games in Athens in 2004 where she reached the quarterfinals in the women's singles.
