= New Zealand at the 1992 Summer Paralympics =

- IPC code: NZL
- NPC: Paralympics New Zealand
- Website: paralympics.org.nz

in Barcelona
- Competitors: 13
- Flag bearer: Dave MacCalman
- Medals Ranked 23rd: Gold 5 Silver 1 Bronze 0 Total 6

Summer Paralympics appearances (overview)
- 1968; 1972; 1976; 1980; 1984; 1988; 1992; 1996; 2000; 2004; 2008; 2012; 2016; 2020; 2024

New Zealand sent a 13-member athlete delegation to the 1992 Summer Paralympics in Barcelona, winning 6 medals: 5 golds, 1 silver and 0 bronze medals.

== Team ==
New Zealand's team in Barcelona included 13 athletes. The delegation included swimmer Jenny Newstead, Cristeen Smith, and team captain Dave MacCalman. The 1992 Games were a transition period for New Zealand Paralympics, as the team went in looking to achieve personal bests. A perception of underperformance at these Games led to changes for the 1996 Games, where the country used the lessons of 1992 to improve their performance.

Smith was quoted as saying of these Games, "We’re not ‘having a go,’ we’ve trained for years to get here. It's an achievement to get here to Barcelona." MacCalman said of these Games, "In a general public area they see the wheelchair first so it’s up to you as a person to portray your personality forward and then the wheelchair is insignificant."

== Medallists ==
The country won 6 medals at the 1992 Summer Paralympics: 5 golds, 1 silver and 0 bronze medals.

Medal	Name	Sport	Event
Gold	Cristeen Smith	Athletics	Women's 100 m TW2
Gold	Jenny Newstead	Swimming	Women's 100 m Freestyle S5
Gold	Jenny Newstead	Swimming	Women's 200 m Medley SM5
Gold	Jenny Newstead	Swimming	Women's 50 m Backstroke S5
Gold	Jenny Newstead	Swimming	Women's 50 m Freestyle S5
Silver	Jenny Newstead	Swimming	Women's 100 m Breaststroke SB5

== Swimming ==
Jenny Newstead won four gold medals in the pool for New Zealand at the Barcelona Games. She set several world records in the process.

== See also ==
- New Zealand at the Paralympics
