= Swimming at the 2004 Summer Paralympics – Men's 50 metre butterfly S5 =

Men's 50m Butterfly S5 at the XII Paralympic Games
- Paralympic Swimming
- Venue: Olympic Aquatic Centre
- Dates: 22 September 2004
- Competitors: 11 from 10 nations
- Winning time: 37.50

Medalists
1st place, gold medalist(s)		He Junquan	China
2nd place, silver medalist(s)		Ervin Kovacs	Hungary
3rd place, bronze medalist(s)		Pascal Pinard	France

The Men's 50 metre butterfly S5 swimming event at the 2004 Summer Paralympics was competed on 22 September. It was won by He Junquan, representing China.

== 1st round ==
Qualified for final round

Heat 1

22 Sept. 2004, morning session

Rank	Athlete	Time	Notes
1	He Junquan (CHN)	37.40	WR
2	Dmytro Kryzhanovskyy (UKR)	39.95	
3	Voravit Kaewkham (THA)	41.18	
4	Marcelo Ariel Quassi (ARG)	50.80	
5	Back Min Jun (KOR)	51.44	

Heat 2

22 Sept. 2004, morning session

Rank	Athlete	Time	Notes
1	Ervin Kovacs (HUN)	39.10	
2	Pascal Pinard (FRA)	40.26	
3	Vidal Dominguez (MEX)	44.15	
4	Javier Torres (ESP)	46.27	
5	Miguel Luque (ESP)	47.90	
	Ryszard Beczek (POL)	DSQ	

== Final round ==
22 Sept. 2004, evening session

Rank	Athlete	Time	Notes
1st place, gold medalist(s)	He Junquan (CHN)	37.50	
2nd place, silver medalist(s)	Ervin Kovacs (HUN)	39.39	
3rd place, bronze medalist(s)	Pascal Pinard (FRA)	39.94	
4	Voravit Kaewkham (THA)	40.44	
5	Dmytro Kryzhanovskyy (UKR)	41.99	
6	Javier Torres (ESP)	46.08	
7	Vidal Dominguez (MEX)	46.53	
8	Miguel Luque (ESP)	51.72	
