= Goalball at the 1992 Summer Paralympics =

Goalball at the IX Paralympic Games
- Paralympic Goalball

Paralympic symbol (1988-1994)

Goalball at the 1992 Summer Paralympics consisted of men's and women's team events.

== Medal summary ==
Event	Gold	Silver	Bronze
Men	Italy (ITA); Natale Castellini; Hubert Perfler; Dario Merelli; Paolo Martini; Roberto Gallucci	Finland (FIN) Juha Oikarainen; Reino Leppanen; Arto Finska; Jorma Kivinen; Asko Kinnunen; Marko Kauppila	Egypt (EGY) Bekhit Gad; Ahmed Moustafa; Mostafa Hussein; Ahmed Ewein; Elsayed Elsayed; Hussen Sayed
Women	Finland (FIN); Iiris Keitel; Maria-Terttu Piiroinen; Airi Penttila; Tarja Pelkonen; Merja Hanski	Denmark (DEN) Lene van der Keur; Helle Brodersen; Anne Hansen; Ann Howalt; Anne-Mette Bredahl; Katja Pedersen	Canada (CAN) Patricia Campion; Anne Jarry; Teresa Lloy; Nathalie Chartrand; Eva Sager; Helena Rooyakkers

=== Medal table ===
Rank	Nation	Gold	Silver	Bronze	Total
1	Finland (FIN)	1	1	0	2
2	Italy (ITA)	1	0	0	1
3	Denmark (DEN)	0	1	0	1
4	Canada (CAN)	0	0	1	1
4	Egypt (EGY)	0	0	1	1
Totals (5 entries)		2	2	2	6

== Men's tournament ==
=== Group A ===
Team	Pld	W	D	L	GF	GA	GD	Pts	Qualification
United States (USA)	5	4	0	1	11	2	+9	12	Semifinals
Egypt (EGY)	5	4	0	1	12	6	+6	12	Semifinals
Germany (GER)	5	3	0	2	20	20	0	9	
Israel (ISR)	5	2	0	3	14	12	+2	6	
Australia (AUS)	5	1	0	4	16	28	-12	3	

=== Group B ===
Team	Pld	W	D	L	GF	GA	GD	Pts	Qualification
Italy (ITA)	5	5	0	0	36	19	+17	15	Semifinals
Finland (FIN)	5	4	0	1	44	10	+34	12	Semifinals
Canada (CAN)	5	3	0	2	30	17	+12	9	
Unified Team (EUN)	5	3	0	2	25	31	-6	9	
Spain (ESP) (H)	5	4	0	1	18	15	+3	6	
Algeria (ALG)	5	0	0	5	6	80	-74	0	

=== Final round ===
Semifinals
A1	Egypt	1
B2	Finland	2
A2	United States	3
B1	Italy	7

Gold medal match
B2	Finland	1
B1	Italy	2
Bronze medal match
A1	Egypt	6
A2	United States	5

== Women's tournament ==
=== Preliminary round ===
Team	Pld	W	D	L	GF	GA	GD	Pts	Qualification
Finland (FIN)	7	6	1	0	25	4	+21	19	Semifinals
Canada (CAN)	7	4	2	3	14	3	+11	14	Semifinals
Denmark (DEN)	7	4	1	2	15	7	+8	13	Semifinals
Sweden (SWE)	7	3	3	1	21	15	+6	12	Semifinals
United States (USA)	7	2	2	3	10	13	-3	8	
Germany (GER)	7	2	1	4	7	9	-2	7	
Australia (AUS)	7	1	1	5	4	15	-11	4	
Spain (ESP) (H)	7	0	1	6	5	28	-23	1	

=== Final round ===
Semifinals
1	Finland (FIN)	2
4	Sweden (SWE)	1
3	Denmark (DEN)	1 (1)
2	Canada (CAN)	1 (0)

Gold medal match
1	Finland (FIN)	1 (4)
3	Denmark (DEN)	1 (1)
Bronze medal match
4	Sweden (SWE)	1
2	Canada (CAN)	3
