= Rebeccah Bornemann =

Canadian para-swimmer

Personal information
- National team: Canada
- Born: 1972 (age 53–54) Vancouver, British Columbia, Canada

Sport
- Country: Canada
- Sport: Para-swimming
- Disability: Cerebral palsy
- Disability class: S7; S8
Medal record
Women's Para-swimming
Representing Canada
Event	1st	2nd	3rd
Paralympic Games	1	0	2
Total	1	0	2
Paralympic Games
Gold medal – first place	1996 Atlanta	Women's 400 m Freestyle S7
Bronze medal – third place	1992 Barcelona	Women's 100 m Freestyle S8
Bronze medal – third place	1992 Barcelona	Women's 400 m Freestyle S8

Rebeccah Bornemann (born in 1972) is a Canadian S7 and S8 para-swimmer who has cerebral palsy and competed in the Paralympic Games, the Commonwealth Games and the IPC Swimming World Championships. She won the gold medal in the women's 400 metres freestyle S7 event at the 1996 Summer Paralympics in Atlanta and bronze medals in each of the women's 100 metres freestyle S8 and the women's 400 metres freestyle S8 competitions. Bornemann took part in the 1994 Commonwealth Games in Victoria, British Columbia and the 1994 IPC Swimming World Championships in Valletta, Malta. She has worked in various Canadian federal governmental departments following her Paralympic career.

== Biography ==
Bornemann was born in 1972, and comes from Vancouver. She has cerebral palsy, and swam in the S7 and S8 categories assessed by the International Paralympic Committee (IPC). Bornemann took up swimming in Halifax, Nova Scotia and found it difficult to earn acceptance by her peers. She was a frequent member of the Canadian swimming squad and attended training camps with the team. Bornemann swam for the Pacific Dolphins, and the Smith College Pioneers.

At the 1992 Summer Paralympics in Barcelona, Spain, Bornemann took part in five events. She won bronze medals in each of the women's 100 metres freestyle S8 and the women's 400 metres freestyle S8 competitions. Bornemann finished fourth at the women's 50-metre freestyle S8 event, and seventh in each of the women's 4 x 100-metre medley S7-10 and the women's 4 x 100-metre freestyle S7-10 events. She was one of four disabled athletes from Canada to partake in the first disabled competitions of the Commonwealth Games in the 1994 edition which was held in Victoria, British Columbia. Bornemann took part in the women's 100-metre freestyle para sport event, finishing sixth in a time of 1 minute, 22.43 seconds. She subsequently qualified to compete as one of 11 swimmers at the 1994 IPC Swimming World Championships in Valletta, Malta. Bornemann placed fourth at the women's 400 metres freestyle S8 event and fifth in the women's 50 metres freestyle S8 competition. She failed to advance beyond the heat rounds at the women's 100 metres freestyle event.

During the 1995 Superior Propane Cup National Championships for Swimmers with a Disability in Lethbridge, Alberta, Bornemann medalled in each of the women's 100 metres freestyle, the women's 50 metres freestyle and the women's 200 metres freestyle. That same year, she was chosen to participate in a meet to prepare for the 1996 Summer Paralympics in Atlanta, United States. At the 1996 Summer Paralympics, Bornemann competed in three competitions during the multi-sport event. She finished first in the women's 400 metres freestyle S7 event to claim her first and only Paralympic gold medal. Bornemann placed fourth at the women's 100 metres freestyle S7 competition and sixth at the women's 50 metres freestyle S7 event.

She joined Sport Canada as a management trainee in 1999. Bornemann held several positions within the branch until she left it 2009 to become responsible as a policy advisor with the Department of Canadian Heritage and later the Department of Justice. She returned to Sport Canada in 2011 as special advisor. Bornemann is a member of the Bronze Circle of Champions, and was a nominee of the Golden Alliance Award of Communications Excellence for working as part of a team on the project Rural Opportunity, National Prosperity: An Economic Development Strategy for Rural Canada for Infrastructure Canada.
