= Eeva Riitta Fingerroos =

Finnish Paralympic swimmer

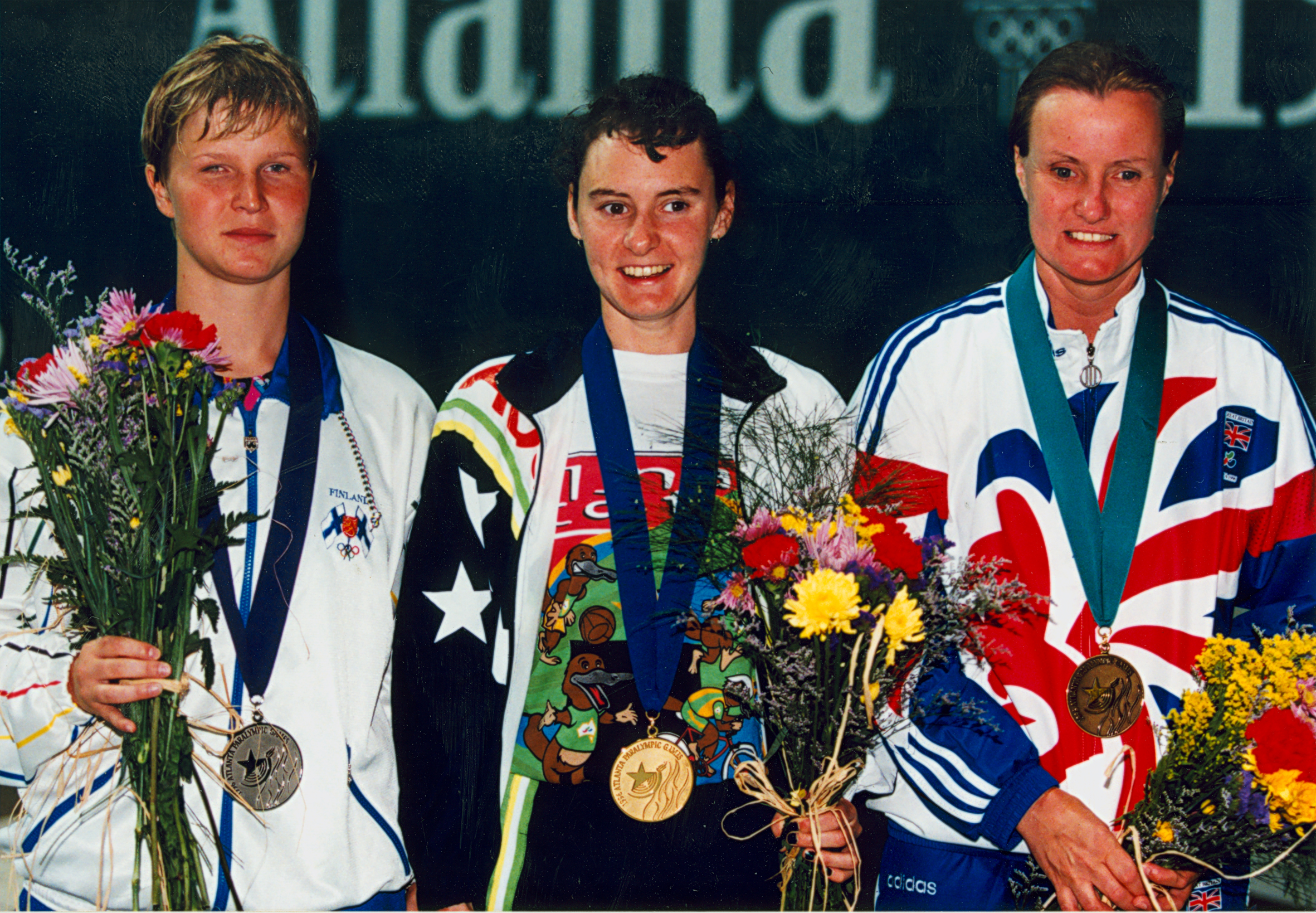
- Fingerroos (left) at the 1996 Summer Paralympics

Personal information
- Born: 4 July 1969 (age 56) Oulu, Finland

Sport
- Country: Finland
- Sport: Paralympic swimming
- Disability class: S11
- Retired: 2000
Medal record
Paralympic swimming
Representing Finland
Paralympic Games
Gold medal – first place	1988 Seoul	Women's 100m butterfly B1
Gold medal – first place	1992 Barcelona	Women's 100m butterfly B1
Silver medal – second place	1984 Stoke Mandeville/New York	Women's 100m butterfly B1
Silver medal – second place	1996 Atlanta	Women's 100m backstroke B1
Silver medal – second place	1996 Atlanta	Women's 100m butterfly B1
Bronze medal – third place	1984 Stoke Mandeville/New York	Women's 100m backstroke B1
Bronze medal – third place	1984 Stoke Mandeville/New York	Women's 200m individual medley B1
Bronze medal – third place	1988 Seoul	Women's 100m backstroke B1
Bronze medal – third place	1988 Seoul	Women's 400m freestyle B1
Bronze medal – third place	1992 Barcelona	Women's 50m freestyle B1
Bronze medal – third place	1992 Barcelona	Women's 100m freestyle B1
Bronze medal – third place	1992 Barcelona	Women's 100m backstroke B1
Bronze medal – third place	1996 Atlanta	Women's 100m freestyle B1
Bronze medal – third place	1996 Atlanta	Women's 200m individual medley B1
Bronze medal – third place	2000 Sydney	Women's 100m freestyle S11

Eeva Riitta "Eve" Fingerroos née Kukkonen (born 4 July 1969) is a retired Finnish Paralympic swimmer who competed in international level events, she specialised in butterfly stroke. She was one of Finland's most successful blind swimmers by winning fourteen medals and competed in five Paralympic Games.

After retiring from swimming, Fingerroos became an entrepreneur designing women's underwear which has sold worldwide.
