= Laurentius van Geel =

Dutch Paralympic swimmer

Sport
- Country: Netherlands
- Sport: Swimming
- Disability class: S7
Medal record
Representing Netherlands
Paralympic swimming
Paralympic Games
| Silver medal – second place | 1992 Barcelona | 100m breaststroke SB7 |
| Bronze medal – third place | 1996 Atlanta | 100m breaststroke SB7 |
| Bronze medal – third place | 1996 Atlanta | 4x100m medley S7-10 |

Laurentius van Geel is a Dutch Paralympic swimmer. He represented the Netherlands at the 1992 Summer Paralympics in Barcelona, Spain and at the 1996 Summer Paralympics in Atlanta, Georgia, United States. In total, he won one silver medal and two bronze medals.

At the 1992 Summer Paralympics, he won the silver medal in the men's 100 m Breaststroke SB7 event. At the 1996 Summer Paralympics, he won bronze medals in the men's 100 m Breaststroke SB7 and men's 4 × 100 m Medley S7-10 events.
