= María Paz Monserrat =

Spanish swimmer

Personal information
- Full name: María Paz Monserrat Blasco
- Born: 24 January 1956 Zaragoza, Spain
- Died: 30 November 2015 (aged 59) Zaragoza, Spain

Sport
- Country: Spain
- Sport: Paralympic swimming
- Disability: Arthrogryposis
- Disability class: S4
Medal record
Paralympic swimming
Representing Spain
Paralympic Games
Silver medal – second place	1992 Barcelona	50m freestyle S3-4
Silver medal – second place	1992 Barcelona	50m backstroke S3-4
Bronze medal – third place	1992 Barcelona	100m freestyle S3-4

María Paz Monserrat Blasco (24 January 1956 - 29 November 2015) was a Spanish paralympic athlete.

She competed in para swimming and won three medals at the 1992 Summer Paralympic Games, in Barcelona.

== Career ==
At the 1992 Summer Paralympics, she won a silver medal in Women's 50 m Freestyle S3-4, silver medal in Women's 50 m Backstroke S3-4, and bronze medal in Women's 100 m Freestyle S3-4.
