= Luisa Regina Cachan Muñoz =

Spanish swimmer

Personal information
- Nationality: Spain
- Born: 21 January 1979 (age 47) Zaragoza, España

Sport
- Sport: Swimming
Medal record
Women's swimming
Representing Spain
Paralympic Games
Silver medal – second place	1992 Barcelona	50m breaststroke SB2
Silver medal – second place	1992 Barcelona	50m butterfly S3-4
Silver medal – second place	2004 Athens	4x50m medley relay 20pts
World Championships
Silver medal – second place	1994 Malta	150m individual medley SM3-4
Silver medal – second place	1994 Malta	50m butterfly S3-4
Bronze medal – third place	1994 Malta	100m freestyle S4

Luisa Regina Cachan Muñoz (born 21 January 1979) is an S4 swimmer from Spain. She has a disability where she cannot use her legs and can only use some of her arms and hands.

Born in Zaragoza, competed at the 1992 Summer Paralympics, 1996 Summer Paralympics and 2000 Summer Paralympics, where she did not medal. She competed at the 2004 Summer Paralympics, where she earned a silver medal in the 4 x 50 meter 20pts relay.
