= Anne Jarry =

Canadian goalball player

Personal information
- Born: 25 September 1962 (age 64) Montreal, Quebec, Canada

Sport
- Country: Canada
- Sport: Goalball
- Disability: Retinopathy caused by diabetes
Medal record
Goalball
Representing Canada
Paralympic Games
Bronze medal – third place	1992 Barcelona	Women's tournament

Anne Jarry (born 25 September 1962) is a former Canadian goalball player who competed in international elite events. She was a bronze medalist at the 1992 Summer Paralympics.

== Personal life ==
Jarry was diagnosed with juvenile diabetes as a young child and received insulin injections on a regular basis by her mother. Jarry went on to have an active life playing tennis nationally for Quebec but had difficult time in her teenage years due to diabetes as her vision was decreasing, she was diagnosed with advanced proliferating diabetic retinopathy in her early twenties which later affected her pancreas and right eye.

Jarry underwent an operation to get a pancreas transplant but her body rejected the new organ and her right eye started bleeding during the operation, she was offered a second pancreas transplant a few months later but didn't want to. She had surgery on her right eye in North Carolina but it proved unsuccessful and has low peripheral vision in this eye. She had another operation on her left eye but it also wasn't successful as she was blind in left eye. In 1988, Jarry took part in the Canada's national women's goalball team and trained alongside Diane Bouthillier and Nathalie Chartrand, Jarry and Chartrand were qualified to compete at the 1992 Summer Paralympics in Barcelona and won a bronze medal in the women's tournament. Jarry retired in 1995 after suffering from a groin injury which also had an effect on her diabetes.
