= Joanne Mucz =

Canadian Paralympic swimmer

Personal information
- Full name: Joanne Mucz Vergara
- Born: March 6, 1972 (age 54) Winnipeg, Manitoba, Canada

Sport
- Sport: Swimming
- Classifications: A4, S9
Medal record
Women's Swimming
Paralympic Games
Gold medal – first place	1988 Seoul	400 m freestyle A4
Silver medal – second place	1988 Seoul	100 m backstroke A4
Silver medal – second place	1988 Seoul	100 m freestyle A4
Gold medal – first place	1992 Barcelona	100 m breaststroke SB8
Gold medal – first place	1992 Barcelona	100 m butterfly S9
Gold medal – first place	1992 Barcelona	100 m freestyle S9
Gold medal – first place	1992 Barcelona	200 m medley SM9
Gold medal – first place	1992 Barcelona	400 m freestyle S9

Joanne Mucz (née Vergara; born March 6, 1972) is a Canadian retired Paralympic medalist in swimming. She won eight medals at the Paralmypic Games with five of them at the 1992 Summer Paralympics. After her retirement in 1996, Mucz was named into the Terry Fox Hall of Fame and the Manitoba Sports Hall of Fame and Museum in 2006.

== Early life and education ==
Joanne Mucz was born on March 6, 1972, in Winnipeg, Manitoba. She started swimming as a child and became a member of the Manta Swim Club in Winnipeg at the age of nine.

== Career ==
At North American events, Mucz won five events at the 1985 nationals held by the United States Amputee Athletic Association. During her races, Mucz broke five world records ranging from the 100 metres backstroke to the 200 metres individual medley. That year at the 1985 Canada Games for the Physically Disabled, Mucz made five Canadian records. At that event, Mucz also remade world records in the 100 metres freestyle, 100 metres butterfly and the 200 metres individual medley.

Mucz won six medals at both the 1986 World Championships for the Disabled and the 1987 International Games for the Disabled. She repeated her medal performance at the World Championships for the Disabled in 1990 and the 1991 Stoke-Mandeville Wheelchair Games.

Outside of her swimming career, Mucz was a part of the Western Canada Summer Games in 1995 as a special guest captain and a manager at the 1999 Pan American Games.

=== Paralympics ===
Alternatively, Mucz's first Paralympic Games was at the 1984 Summer Paralympics where she did not medal. Her following Paralympic Games saw her broke world records at the 1988 Summer Paralympics and 1992 Summer Paralympics while winning her final medals. Mucz retired in 1992.

== Awards and honours ==
Mucz was inducted into the Terry Fox Hall of Fame in 1996, and the Manitoba Sports Hall of Fame and Museum in 2006. In 2012, Mucz was awarded with the Circle of Excellence by Swimming Canada.

== Personal life ==
Mucz was married in 2001 and currently has three kids.
