= Pierre Bellot (swimmer) =

French Paralympic swimmer

Personal information
- Born: 8 November 1968 (age 57) Longjumeau, France

Sport
- Country: France
- Sport: Paralympic swimming
- Disability class: S4
Medal record
Paralympic swimming
Representing France
Paralympic Games
Gold medal – first place	1992 Barcelona	Men's 50m freestyle S4
Gold medal – first place	1992 Barcelona	Men's 100m freestyle S4
Gold medal – first place	1992 Barcelona	Men's 50m butterfly S3-4
Gold medal – first place	1992 Barcelona	Men's 50m backstroke S4
Silver medal – second place	1996 Atlanta	Men's 50m backstroke S4

Pierre Bellot (born 8 November 1968) is a former French Paralympic swimmer who competed at international elite events. He was a four-time Paralympic champion.

Bellot was born without his arms and only has one leg, he practiced to do everyday tasks with his mouth and leg since he was a child. He is now a self-taught painter and has art exhibitions all around Europe and his artwork has been on display at the European Parliament in Strasbourg four times. He was award the National Order of Merit in 1996 by Jacques Chirac after winning five medals at the Paralympics.
