= Peter Hull =

British Paralympic swimmer

Peter Hull MBE
Personal information
- Nationality: British
- Born: 6 December 1965 (age 60) Paris, France
Medal record
Representing Great Britain
Men's swimming
Paralympic Games
Gold medal – first place	1992 Barcelona	50 m backstroke S2
Gold medal – first place	1992 Barcelona	50 m freestyle S2
Gold medal – first place	1992 Barcelona	100 m freestyle S2

Peter Maurice Hull, MBE (born 6 December 1965 in Paris, France) is a British Paralympic gold medalist.

== Early life ==
Peter Hull was born in France to English parents. He was born without legs and with arms ending at the elbow. From a young age he attended Chailey Heritage School in Sussex. In his teens he was a boarder at the Hephaistos School, Arborfield, Berkshire. He studied leisure and sport at Farnborough College of Technology.

== Sporting career ==
=== Swimming ===
Peter Hull began swimming regularly at the age of 5. In 1975, aged 9, he won a gold medal in his first gala at the British Sports Association for the Disabled (BSAD) National Championships at Stoke Mandeville (though he was the only swimmer in his classification).

Later he became National Junior and Senior Short Course Champion in 25, 50 and 100m backstroke and freestyle.

- 1988 he was a member of the British swimming team for the Seoul Paralympics (Four 4th places)
- 1991 - Winner of three Gold medals in the 50m backstroke, 50m and 100m freestyle at the Disabled European Swimming Championships
- 1992 - Winner of three Gold medals (all with World Records) at the 1992 Barcelona Paralympics in the 50m backstroke and freestyle and 100m freestyle
- 1994 - British Swim Team Captain - winners of the Disability World Swimming Championships
- 1995 - Member of British Swim Team - winners of the Disability European Swimming Championships
- 2001 – Swam in the IPC European Swimming Championships, Stockholm

=== Marathons ===
Hull has completed 12 full marathons in a wheelchair, including the London Marathon 6 times, and 18 half marathons. In the process he raised money for the British Sports Association for the Disabled (BSAD)

== Personal life ==
Peter was the subject of Marc Quinn's sculpture in white marble Peter Hull (1999), now at the Groninger Museum

He appeared as an extra, 'Lofty', in Antony Sher's Changing Step (BBC Scotland 1990) television play, directed by Richard Wilson, about a World War I amputee who falls in love with a nurse.

In the 1991 Birthday Honours, he was appointed a Member of the Order of the British Empire (MBE) for services to sport for the disabled.

In 1985 he was named one of The Times Men of the Year, along with Terry Waite and Simon Weston and others.

Peter Hull is County Development Officer for Disability Sport at Hampshire County Council. He is President of the Rushmoor Mallards disability sports club and sits on the committee (and is former chair) of the Jubilee Sailing Trust.

Peter Hull took up wheelchair rugby in 2012 and is currently chair of Team Solent Sharks Wheelchair Rugby Club, based at Solent University.
