= Jason Wening =

Sport
- Country: United States
- Sport: Paralympic swimming
- Disability class: S8
Medal record
Paralympic swimming
Representing United States
Paralympic Games
Gold medal – first place	1992 Barcelona	400m freestyle S8
Gold medal – first place	1992 Barcelona	200m individual medley SM8
Gold medal – first place	1992 Barcelona	4x100m freestyle relay S7-10
Gold medal – first place	1996 Atlanta	400m freestyle S8
Gold medal – first place	2000 Sydney	400m freestyle S8
Bronze medal – third place	1992 Barcelona	4x100m medley relay S7-10
World Championships
Gold medal – first place	1998 Christchurch	400m freestyle S8
Bronze medal – third place	1994 Malta	200m individual medley SM8

Jason D. Wening is an American managing clinician and former Paralympian.

== Early life and Paralympic career ==
Wening was born to parents John and Charlotte Wening in Jefferson City, Missouri. At the time of his birth, much of his legs below the knees were undeveloped and he was missing two fingers on his left hand. Due to his father's military career, his parents enrolled him in swimming lessons to build a support system and teach him discipline and perseverance. While attending O'Fallon Township High School, Wening was invited to the United States Disabled Sports Championships Paralympic Trials prior to the 1992 Summer Paralympics. During this time, he broke the United States Class A-3 swimming record in the 400-meter freestyle with a time of 5:19.9. Wening qualified for the team and won three gold medals and one bronze during the competition.

Wening attended Worcester Polytechnic Institute and competed in freestyle events against able-bodied swimmers before enrolling at the University of Michigan. While at Worcester, he majored in applied mathematics and competed in the 1994 IPC Swimming World Championships, winning one gold and two bronze. After winning a gold medal during the 1996 Summer Paralympics, the school proclaimed September 18, 1996 to be "Jason Wening Day." Upon graduating, Wening attended the University of Michigan for his doctoral degree in biomedical engineering. He joined the Ann Arbor Swim Club in 1997 where he both trained and coached high school swimmers. The following year, Wening competed in the USA Swimming Disability Championships where he won the 100, 200, 400 and 1500m freestyle, while also setting world records in three events. For this achievement, he was the co-recipient of the Phillips 66 Swimmer of the Meet award.

Wening continued his triumph in the Paralympic Games in 2000 when he broke his own world record the same day. As co-captain of the team, he set a new world record during the 400-meter freestyle qualifying swim which he later beat to win a gold medal. His gold medal winning time was 4:42.97, beating his earlier record by three seconds. This also continued his streak as record holder to the 400-meter freestyle which he had held since 1991.

== Post-Paralympics ==
After retiring from Para-athletics, Wening completed his Prosthetics and Orthotics training at Northwestern University. He joined Scheck and Siress as an orthotist and received the Orthotic and Prosthetic Education and Research Foundation's Small Grant Award for his paper Effects of Two Different AFOs on the Gait of Acute Hemiplegic CVA Subjects. In 2012, he was elected a Fellow of the American Academy of Orthotists and Prosthetists and later promoted to Scheck and Siress's laboratory manager. In 2018, Wening was named a shareholder of the company. Jason is now a part of Hangar Clinic a much larger company after Scheck and Siress was bought recently for 50 million dollars.
