= Sonia Guirado Crespo =

Spanish Paralympic swimmer

Personal information
- Born: 16 November 1976 (age 49) Badalona, Spain

Sport
- Country: Spain
- Sport: Paralympic swimming
- Disability class: S3
Medal record
Paralympic swimming
Representing Spain
Paralympic Games
Gold medal – first place	1992 Barcelona	Women's 50m backstroke S2
Bronze medal – third place	1992 Barcelona	Women's 50m freestyle S2
Bronze medal – third place	1992 Barcelona	Women's 100m freestyle S2
World Championships
Bronze medal – third place	1994 Malta	Women's 50m backstroke S3

Sonia Guirado Crespo (born 16 November 1976) is a retired Spanish Paralympic swimmer who competed in backstroke and freestyle swimming events in international level events.
