= Tania Cerda Meseguer =

Spanish Paralympic swimmer

Personal information
- Nationality: Spain
- Born: 30 September 1977 (age 48) Badalona, Spain

Sport
- Sport: Swimming
Medal record
Women's swimming
Representing Spain
Paralympic Games
Bronze medal – third place	1992 Barcelona	4x100m medley relay S7-10
Bronze medal – third place	1996 Atlanta	4x100m medley relay S7-10

Tania Cerda Meseguer (born September 30, 1977) is a female S9 swimmer from Spain. She competed at the 1992 and 1996 Summer Paralympics, winning a bronze medal in the 4 x 100 meter Relay 34 Points race consecutively. She also competed at the 2000 Summer Paralympics in Sydney, Australia.
