= English Federation of Disability Sport =

Is an organization for promoting sports for disabled people

The English Federation of Disability Sport (EFDS) is now operating as Activity Alliance. The charity is an umbrella organization promoting sport for disabled people in England. Founded in 1998, the Federation brought together a number of organizations who had separately promoted disabled sports before its creation. EFDS promotes opportunities for youth with disabilities to participate in sport, in addition to its work with adult athletes.

It is based at Loughborough in Leicestershire and is a registered charity.

Disability Sport Events (DSE) was merged with the EFDS in 2005, where it became an events division. DSE was formerly known as Disability Sports England (DSE) and originally as the British Sports Association for the Disabled (BSAD), founded by Ludwig Guttmann in 1961.

== See also ==
- WheelPower
