= Pascal Pinard =

French Paralympic swimmer

Medal record

Men's para swimming

Representing France

Paralympic Games
Gold medal – first place	1992 Barcelona	100 m breaststroke SB4
Gold medal – first place	1992 Barcelona	100 m freestyle S5
Gold medal – first place	1992 Barcelona	200 m medley SM5
Gold medal – first place	1992 Barcelona	4x50 m medley S1-6
Gold medal – first place	1992 Barcelona	50 m butterfly S5
Gold medal – first place	1996 Atlanta	100 m breaststroke SB4
Gold medal – first place	2004 Athens	100 m breaststroke SB4
Silver medal – second place	1992 Barcelona	4x50 m freestyle S1-6
Silver medal – second place	1996 Atlanta	200 m medley SM5
Silver medal – second place	2000 Sydney	100 m breaststroke SB4
Silver medal – second place	2000 Sydney	200 m medley SM5
Silver medal – second place	2000 Sydney	50 m butterfly S5
Bronze medal – third place	1992 Barcelona	50 m backstroke S5
Bronze medal – third place	1992 Barcelona	50 m freestyle S5
Bronze medal – third place	1996 Atlanta	50 m freestyle S5
Bronze medal – third place	1996 Atlanta	50 m butterfly S5
Bronze medal – third place	2004 Athens	200 m medley SM5
Bronze medal – third place	2004 Athens	50 m butterfly S5

Pascal Pinard (born 10 September 1965) is a French swimmer and multiple Paralympic gold medallist.

He first represented France at the 1992 Summer Paralympics in Barcelona, winning five gold medals, a silver and two bronze. He represented France again at the 1996 Games, taking a gold, a silver and two bronze. He won three silver medals at the 2000 Summer Paralympics, and then a gold and two bronze in 2004.

Pinard was born with his left leg going no further than the knee, and no forearms.

He worked as a librarian for the city of Rennes. Afterwards he worked for more than a decade for the French multinational electric utility company, EDF.
