= Chris Holmes, Baron Holmes of Richmond =

British swimmer (born 1971)

The Right Honourable The Lord Holmes of Richmond MBE
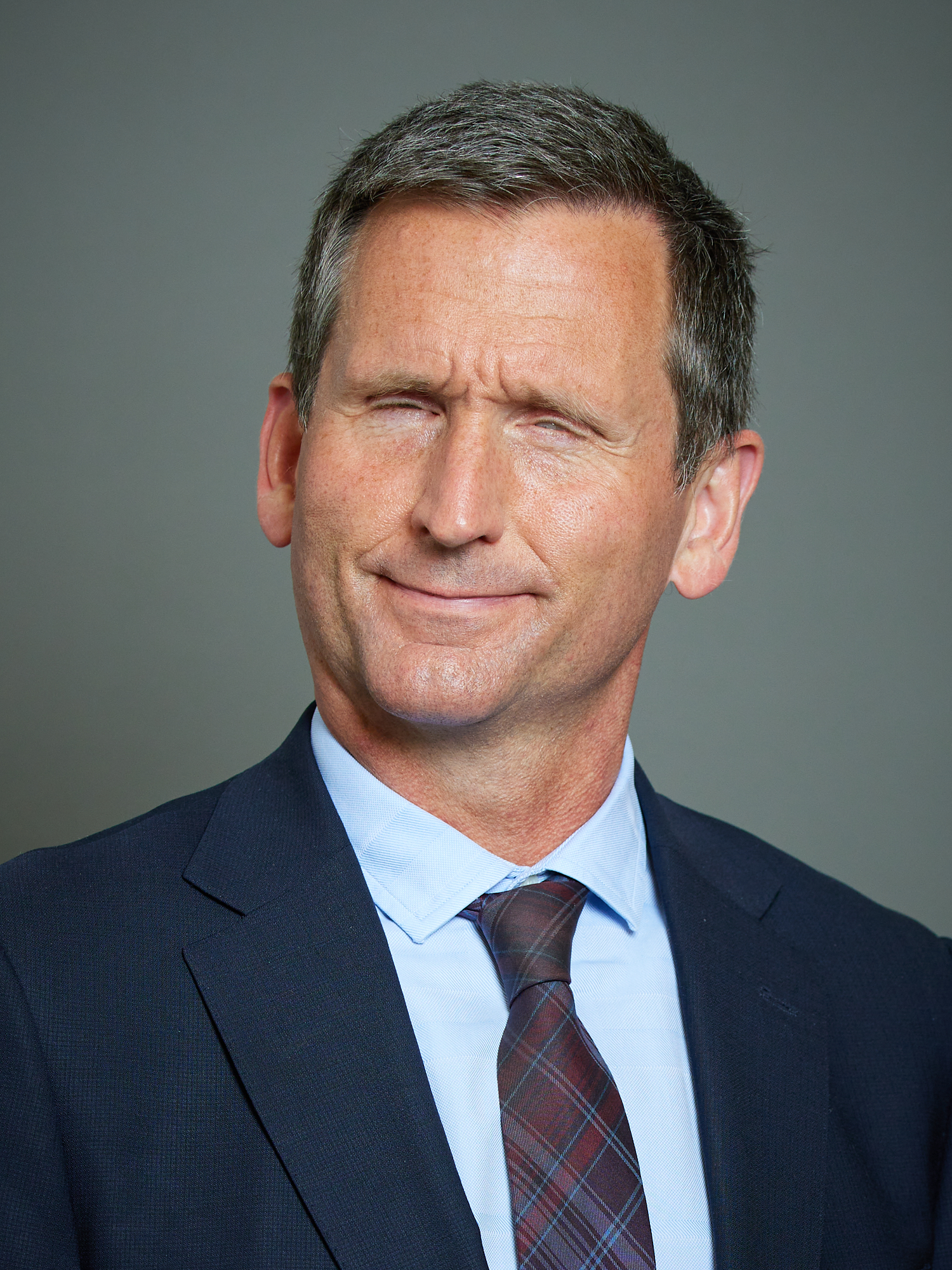
- Holmes in 2022

Member of the House of Lords
- Lord Temporal
- Life peerage 13 September 2013

Personal details
- Born: Christopher Holmes; 15 October 1971 (age 55) Peterborough, Cambridgeshire, England
- Party: Conservative
- Sports career
- National team: Great Britain
- Sport: Swimming
- Classifications: B2 / S12
Medal record
Para swimming
Representing Great Britain
Paralympic Games
Gold medal – first place	1992 Barcelona	50m freestyle B2
Gold medal – first place	1992 Barcelona	100m freestyle B2
Gold medal – first place	1992 Barcelona	400m freestyle B2
Gold medal – first place	1992 Barcelona	100m backstroke B2
Gold medal – first place	1992 Barcelona	200m backstroke B2
Gold medal – first place	1992 Barcelona	200m individual medley B2
Gold medal – first place	1996 Atlanta	50m freestyle B2
Gold medal – first place	1996 Atlanta	100m freestyle B2
Gold medal – first place	1996 Atlanta	100m backstroke B2
Silver medal – second place	1988 Seoul	50m freestyle B2
Silver medal – second place	1988 Seoul	400m freestyle B2
Silver medal – second place	1992 Barcelona	400m individual medley B1-2
Silver medal – second place	1996 Atlanta	200m medley B2
Silver medal – second place	2000 Sydney	4×100m medley relay S11-13
Bronze medal – third place	1988 Seoul	100m freestyle B2

Christopher Holmes, Baron Holmes of Richmond, MBE (born 15 October 1971), is a British life peer in the House of Lords and former swimmer. He won a total of nine gold, five silver, and one bronze medal at the Paralympic Games. Holmes represented Great Britain at four Paralympic Games between 1988 and 2000 and is the only British Paralympic swimmer to win six gold medals at a single Games.

After retiring from swimming he worked as a journalist and solicitor. He was Director of Paralympic Integration for the London Olympics and it was announced that he would be elevated to the House of Lords in August 2013, as a Conservative Party peer.

== Early life and education ==
Holmes was born in Peterborough on 15 October 1971. His family moved to Kidderminster when he was three. He was educated at Harry Cheshire Comprehensive School, Kidderminster. He then studied Social and Political Sciences at King's College, Cambridge, graduating with a Bachelor of Arts (BA) degree; in 1998, as per tradition, his BA was promoted to a Master of Arts (Oxbridge and Dublin) (MA (Cantab)) degree. In 2001, he gained a post graduate diploma in law (PGDL) at BPP Law School and in 2002 he completed the Legal Practice Course.

== Swimming career ==
Holmes was already a good swimmer with the goal of representing his country, when he became blind as a teenager due to Familial exudative vitreoretinopathy, a genetic eye disorder. He joined a Birmingham club where he committed to the same training regime as sighted swimmers aspiring to the Olympics.

Holmes was a member of the Great Britain swimming team from 1985 to 2002 and its captain for five years. He qualified for the Seoul 1988 Paralympic Games, where he won two silver medals (50m freestyle B2, 400m freestyle B2) and a bronze (100m freestyle B2).

At the Barcelona 1992 Paralympics, he gathered a record six gold medals, all in the B2 class, triumphing in the 50m freestyle, 100m backstroke, 100m freestyle, 200m backstroke, 200m individual medley, and 400m freestyle; he also won silver in the B1-2 class 400m individual medley.

Holmes won a further three golds at the 1996 Atlanta Paralympics, in the B2 class: 50m freestyle, 100m backstroke, 100m freestyle; and a silver in the 200m medley B2. He followed this up with silver in the 4 × 100 m medley relay S11-13 at Sydney 2000.

He has often been described as "one of Britain's greatest Paralympians". He became a Paralympic activist, in particular drawing attention to the issues of equal accommodations and facilities for Paralympic athletes. Holmes also swam at two World Championships and seven European Championships, and held seven world records, 10 European records and 12 GB records.

== Professional life ==
Holmes was a member of the Implementation Board for the UK Sports Institute, from 1999 to 2000. From 2001 to 2004 he sat on the UK Sport Awards Panel, responsible for the funding of Olympic and Paralympic athletes. From 2005 to 2013 he was a member of the Board of UK Sport, responsible for the funding for the Olympic and Paralympic athletes set to compete at the London 2012 Games. Holmes chaired the Audit and Risk Committee for seven years. He was also a member of the Mission 2012 Panel. Holmes was an Ambassador to London 2012 Olympic Bid 2003–2005.

From 2002 Holmes was a Commissioner for the Disability Rights Commission where he sat on the Legal Committee and Audit Committee. Successes included the Ross V Ryan Air Court of Appeal Decision, Roads V Central Trains and Archibald V Fife Council.

Between 2002 and 2009 Holmes worked as a solicitor specialising in commercial, employment and pensions law at Ashurst, London.

In August 2009, he was named the Director of Paralympic Integration for the 2012 Olympics and Paralympics in London. In 2013 he was appointed as Non-executive Director to the Equality and Human Rights Commission where one of his projects was working with Ofcom and the Creative Diversity Network to launch a new guide to the law for the broadcast industry providing clarity about initiatives and actions to promote diversity.

In 2015 he was appointed as special adviser on Diversity and Inclusion to the Civil Service and in 2016 he was appointed as Non-executive Director to the Channel 4 Board. He is Chancellor at BPP University.

Holmes has campaigned against 'shared space' street design, publishing a report in 2015 that found shared space to be unpopular with two-thirds of users.

Holmes has been a member of House of Lords Select Committees on Digital Skills, Social Mobility, Financial Exclusion, Artificial Intelligence and Democracy and Digital Technologies and speaks often in debates. He introduced a Private Members Bill to prohibit unpaid work experience exceeding four weeks which has been described as a ban on unpaid internships. In November 2017 he published a report called "Distributed Ledger Technologies for Public and Private Good: leadership, collaboration and innovation" in which he makes a 'call to action' for collaboration between academia, government and industry to develop the potential of DLT.

Holmes conducted an independent review for the government exploring how to open up public appointments to disabled people. The government responded to the Lord Holmes Review, accepting the principle of all his recommendations and publishing a refreshed Public Appointments Diversity Action Plan on 27 June 2019, underpinned by the recommendations. Two years later, Holmes published a Progress Report calling on the government to implement commitments made in the Public Appointments Diversity Action Plan.

He has been described by The Times as a 'banking superhero' for his work promoting financial inclusion which includes protecting access to cash as well as calling for an access to digital payments review.

Holmes proposed an amendment to the Financial Services Act 2021 that would permit cashback without purchase. The government accepted the amendment and the change came into force when the law was passed. Holmes proposed other amendments, not accepted by the government, including amendment 35 which would require the Bank of England's Financial Policy Committee to monitor "exclusion from financial services in the United Kingdom" as well as playing a role in the provision of basic banking services. Others proposed amendments included adding a financial inclusion objective to the remit of the Financial Conduct Authority, permitting rights of action for breaches of Financial Conduct Authority handbook for SMEs and a review of financial services regulations. Further amendments tabled by Holmes related to the ethical use of artificial intelligence by companies in the financial sector, digital operational resilience in the UK financial system and a UK Centre for Applied Innovation in Financial Services.

Holmes speaks regularly at corporate, public sector, community and charity events across the UK and worldwide.

Holmes sat on the Special Public Bill Committee for the Electronic Trade Documents Bill which received Royal Assent in July 2023. He has tried to raise awareness of the new law, describing it as "the most important law no one has heard of."

== Awards ==
In 1992 Holmes was Midlands Today Sports Personality of the year and Bass Midlander of the year. The following year he was appointed a Member of the Order of the British Empire (MBE) in the 1993 New Year Honours for services to swimming for disabled people. The SAF Paul Zetter Award was presented to Holmes in 1996, and in 1997 he was Sports Personality of the year Variety Club of GB. On 4 July 2012 he received an honorary degree of Doctor of Laws from Bath University.

== Parliament ==
On 13 September 2013, Holmes was created a life peer taking the title Baron Holmes of Richmond, of Richmond in the London Borough of Richmond upon Thames. He made his maiden speech on 28 November 2013 in a debate on the Economy: Broadcast Media and is an active member of the Lords with a policy focus on digital technology for the public good, social mobility, employment, education, skills, culture, media and sport.

In 2023 he introduced a Private Member's Bill, the 'Artificial Intelligence (Regulation) Bill, arguing that specific AI regulation was required to enable the opportunities and mitigate the risks of AI. He reintroduced the same Bill in the next Parliamentary session in 2025 and continues to call for cross-industry AI legislation warning that the government's wait and see approach is failing business, citizens and the economy.

He has been a member of several ad hoc Select Committees in the House of Lords. From 2014 to 2015 he sat on the Digital Skills Select Committee. From 2015 to 2016 he sat on the Social Mobility Select Committee, appointed to consider social mobility in the transition from school to work for 14-24 year olds. From 2016 to 2017 he sat on the Select Committee on Financial Exclusion. From 2017 to 2018 he was a member of the Select Committee on Artificial Intelligence; appointed by the House of lords to consider the economic, ethical and social implications of advances in artificial intelligence. From 2018 to 2019 he sat on the House of Lords Select Committee on Intergenerational Fairness and Provision. From 2019 to 2020 he was a member of the Select Committee on Democracy and Digital Technologies.

Holmes tabled amendments to the Agriculture Bill that focussed on digital infrastructure and innovation. One proposed amendment (Amendment 157) would have required the government to include broadband provision and digital literacy within the section of the bill that deals with financial support for rural development. Another proposed amendment (Amendment 253 Page 32, line 36, at end insert "( ) the administration of maintaining marketing standards of imported wine products, including the digitisation of VI-1 forms) encouraged the government to consider the digitisation of wine import forms.

Holmes put forward several amendments to the Financial Services Act 2021 during its Lords stages. The amendments were related to fintech and financial inclusion and one amendment regarding cashback without purchase was accepted by the Government and passed into law when the bill gained Royal Assent in April 2021.

In May 2021, Holmes was appointed to the House of Lords Science and Technology Select Committee. Since joining the Committee he has co-authored reports on the role of batteries and fuel cells in achieving Net Zero, nature-based solutions for climate change, delivering a UK science and technology strategy and the effects of artificial light and noise on human health.

Holmes sponsored Rosie Cooper MP's Private Members Bill, which would give British Sign Language legal recognition in England, Wales and Scotland, in the House of Lords. It was passed as the British Sign Language Act 2022.

Holmes tabled several amendments to the Elections Bill proposing research into the use of blockchain technology for electronic voting and to improve the security of the electoral register He also proposed amendments with the purpose of ensuring the "accessibility, inclusivity, independence and secrecy of every voters vote cast." Lord Holmes's amendments to enable or facilitate independent and secret voting by voters who are blind or partially sighted or have another disability were signed by Lord Blunkett and agreed to by the House of Lords without a vote during Report Stage on 6 April 2022.

Orders of precedence in the United Kingdom
Preceded by The Lord Purvis of Tweed	Gentlemen; Baron Holmes of Richmond	Followed by The Lord Leigh of Hurley
