= Mark Altmann =

Australian Paralympic swimmer

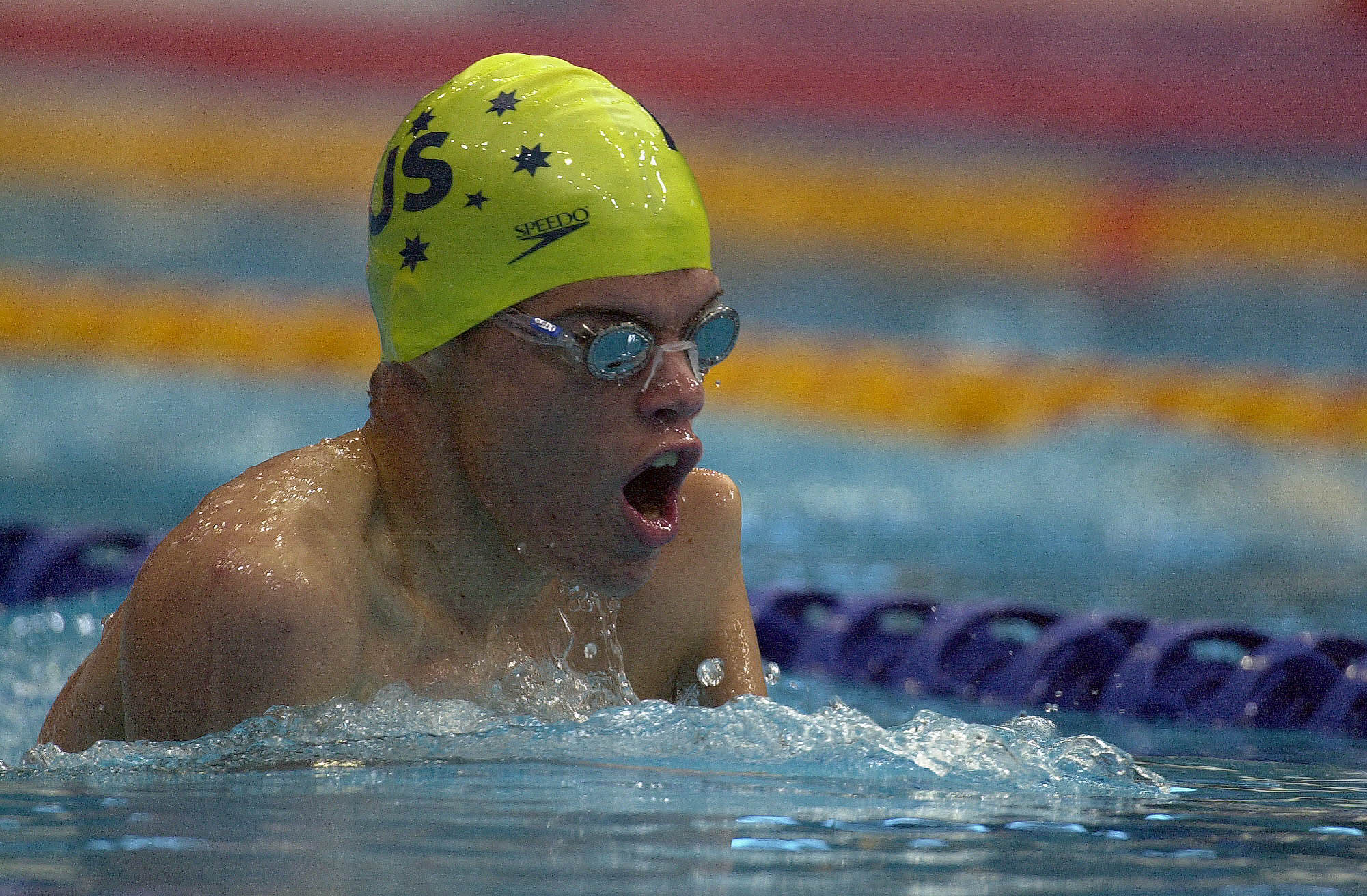
- Action shot of Altmann in the 200 m medley SM7 at the 2000 Summer Paralympics

Personal information
- Nationality: Australia
Medal record
Swimming
Paralympic Games
Bronze medal – third place	2000 Sydney	Men's 50 m Butterfly S7

Mark Altmann is a Paralympic swimming competitor from Australia. He won a bronze medal at the 2000 Sydney Games in the Men's 50 m Butterfly S7 event. His time was 34.39.
