= Clare Cunningham (athlete) =

British Paralympic swimmer and triathlete (born 1977)

Clare Bishop
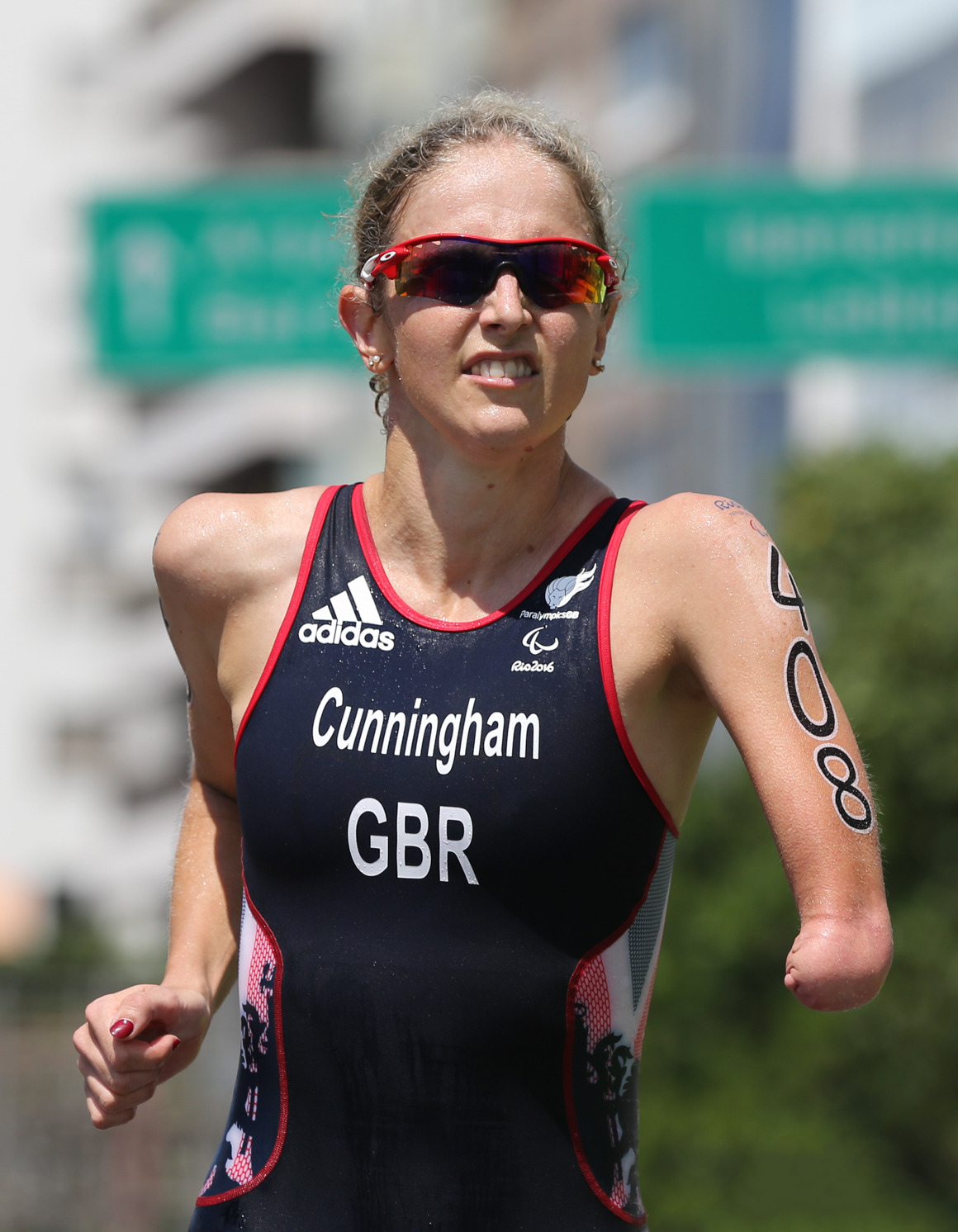
- Bishop at the 2016 Paralympics

Personal information
- Nationality: United Kingdom
- Born: 15 June 1977 (age 49) Hillingdon, UK
- Height: 5 ft 6 in (168 cm)
Medal record
Representing United Kingdom
Women's Swimming
Paralympic Games
Gold medal – first place	1992 Barcelona	50m freestyle S9
Silver medal – second place	1992 Barcelona	100m backstroke S9
Silver medal – second place	1992 Barcelona	100m freestyle S9
Silver medal – second place	1992 Barcelona	4×100m freestyle relay S7-10
Silver medal – second place	1992 Barcelona	4×100m medley relay S7-10
IPC Swimming World Championships
Gold medal – first place	Malta 1994	100m freestyle S9
Silver medal – second place	Malta 1994	100m butterfly S9
Bronze medal – third place	Malta 1994	50m freestyle S9
Bronze medal – third place	Malta 1994	200m medley SM9
Bronze medal – third place	Malta 1994	4×100m medley relay S7-10
Women's Paratriathlon
ITU Triathlon World Championships
Gold medal – first place	2009 Gold Coast	TRI 4
Silver medal – second place	2010 Budapest	TRI 4
Silver medal – second place	2011 Beijing	TRI 4
Silver medal – second place	2012 Auckland	TRI 4
Bronze medal – third place	2013 London	TRI 4
Bronze medal – third place	2014 Edmonton	PT4
European Triathlon Championships
Gold medal – first place	2009 Holten	TRI 4
Silver medal – second place	2010 Athlone	TRI 4
Bronze medal – third place	2011 Pontevedra	TRI 4
Silver medal – second place	2013 Alanya	TRI 4
Bronze medal – third place	2015 Geneva	PT4
ITU Aquathlon World Championships
Bronze medal – third place	2012 Auckland	TRI 4

Clare Bishop (formerly Cunningham; born 15 June 1977) is a retired Paralympic swimmer and triathlete who represented Great Britain. She was born without her left forearm.

Bishop first swam in international competition at the age of 13, at the 1990 World Championships and Games for the Disabled in Assen, The Netherlands. At the 1992 Summer Paralympics, Bishop won the Women's S9 50m freestyle event in what was then World Record time. She won silver medals in 100m freestyle, 100m backstroke, 4 × 100 m freestyle relay and 4 × 100 m medley relay events. She competed at the 1996 Summer Paralympics but did not win a medal. She retired from swimming after the Atlanta Paralympic games.

In 2006, Bishop turned to triathlon. Initially competing in age-group races against non-disabled triathletes, she discovered paratriathlon in 2009. Classified as a TRI-4 (arm-impaired) paratriathlete, she became the 2009 ITU European Paratriathlon Champion and 2009 World Paratriathlon Champion in her class. She placed second at the ITU World Paratriathlon Championships in 2010, 2011, and 2012, and third in 2013 and 2014.

In late 2012, Bishop was elected to the International Triathlon Union Athletes Committee. She and South African Oswald Kydd, elected on the same day, are the first-ever paratriathlete representatives on the ITU Athletes Committee.

Bishop competed in paratriathlon at the 2016 Summer Paralympics in the PT4 category and finished seventh.

To prepare for Rio 2016, Bishop took a sabbatical from her career as a Chartered Accountant at Deloitte. She has a 2:1 MA Honours in English Language and Literature from the University of St Andrews, Scotland.

Since retiring, Bishop has gained an MSc in Sport and Exercise Psychology with distinction from Loughborough University. Bishop is now using her wide range of experience of Paralympic sport in her role as Head of Athlete Services at the British Paralympic Association. The Beijing 2022 Winter Paralympic Games were her second games as a member of ParalympicsGB where, as Deputy Chef de Mission, she was responsible for all areas of team education, safeguarding, welfare and anti-doping.

Bishop, alongside Sir Matthew Pinset, was recruited to the SportAid Board of Trustees at the start of 2023. She was appointed as a director for a three-year term.
