= Tara Flood =

British Paralympic swimmer

Personal information
- Born: Preston, Lancashire, Great Britain

Sport
- Country: United Kingdom
- Sport: Paralympic swimming
- Disability class: S2
Medal record
Paralympic swimming
Representing United Kingdom
Paralympic Games
| Gold medal – first place | 1992 Barcelona | Women's 50m breaststroke SB2 |
| Silver medal – second place | 1984 Stoke Mandeville / New York | Women's 25m freestyle L1 |
| Silver medal – second place | 1992 Barcelona | Women's 100m freestyle S3-4 |
| Bronze medal – third place | 1984 Stoke Mandeville / New York | Women's 25m backstroke L1 |
| Bronze medal – third place | 1988 Seoul | Women's 25m breaststroke L1 |
| Bronze medal – third place | 1992 Barcelona | Women's 50m freestyle S3-4 |
| Bronze medal – third place | 1992 Barcelona | Women's 4x50m medley S1-6 |

Tara Flood (born 1966) is a retired British Paralympic swimmer who competed in three Paralympic Games and winning seven medals. She was born without her forearms. She is now a disability rights activist.

== Personal life ==
Flood was born in Preston, Lancashire and was discriminated by her grandmother who often insulted her mother by saying "look what Sally's given birth to" which emotionally affected both Tara and her mother. Her mother had a nervous breakdown when Tara was two days old and was heavily sedated.

She attended a residential special school at sixteen months to her sixteenth birthday in East Sussex.

== Swimming career ==
Flood's first experiences of being in the pool was when she was two or three years old, she was thrown into the pool and described "those of us that literally bobbed to the surface were just sort of like, oh great, let's really sort of get on, and those that didn't were just sort of pulled out".

Flood began swimming aged five at her residential school where she took swimming lessons with other children who had similar disabilities to her. She began swimming competitively aged twelve then attended the 1984 Summer Paralympics in New York City aged thirteen.

== Disability rights activism ==
Flood works in London at Hammersmith & Fulham Council as a disability activist and worked in various disability rights charities in the city. She was also involved with the UN Convention on the Rights of Persons with Disabilities and is campaigning to get the Convention fully implemented.
