= János Becsey =

Hungarian Paralympic swimmer

Personal information
- Nickname: Becso
- Born: 2 February 1968 (age 58) Budapest, Hungary

Sport
- Country: Hungary
- Sport: Para swimming
- Disability: Cerebral paresis
- Disability class: S7, SB6, SM7
Medal record
Men's para swimming
Representing Hungary
Paralympic Games
Gold medal – first place	1992 Barcelona	50m freestyle S7
Gold medal – first place	1992 Barcelona	100m freestyle S7
Silver medal – second place	2000 Sydney	200m ind. medley SM7
Bronze medal – third place	1988 Seoul	200m ind. medley C8
Bronze medal – third place	1992 Barcelona	100m breaststroke SB7
World Championships
Bronze medal – third place	1998 Christchurch	100m breastroke SB7
Bronze medal – third place	2002 Mar del Plata	200m ind. medley SM7

János Becsey (born 2 February 1968) is a retired Hungarian Paralympic swimmer. He competed at the Paralympic Games six times and won five medals, including two golds at the 1992 Summer Paralympics in Barcelona. In addition, he is also a four-time World Championships gold medalist.

He was inspired to start swimming after watching the 1976 Summer Olympics, when he was only eight years old, and began training at age of 6.

Becsey has cerebral paresis on his right side due to oxygen deprivation and a stroke when he was an infant.
