= Jenny Newstead (swimmer) =

New Zealand Paralympic swimmer

Jenny Newstead MBE
Personal information
- Full name: Jennifer Frances Newstead
- Born: 1966 or 1967 (age 58–59)
Medal record
Women's para swimming
Representing New Zealand
Paralympic Games
Gold medal – first place	1992 Barcelona	50 m backstroke - S5
Gold medal – first place	1992 Barcelona	50 m freestyle - S5
Gold medal – first place	1992 Barcelona	100 m freestyle - S5
Gold medal – first place	1992 Barcelona	200 m medley - SM5
Gold medal – first place	1996 Atlanta	100 m backstroke - S6
Gold medal – first place	1996 Atlanta	100 m breaststroke - SB4
Gold medal – first place	1996 Atlanta	200 m freestyle - S6
Silver medal – second place	1992 Barcelona	100 m breaststroke - SB4
Silver medal – second place	1996 Atlanta	200 m medley - SM5
Bronze medal – third place	1996 Atlanta	100 m freestyle - S6

Jennifer Frances Newstead MBE (born 1966 or 1967) is a former paralympic swimmer from New Zealand who competed mainly in category S5 events. She won a total of 10 Paralympic medals, including seven gold medals, and broke 37 world records in her career.

== Career ==
Newstead was part of the New Zealand swimming team at both the 1992 and 1996 Summer Paralympics winning a total of 10 medals, seven of them gold. She was coached by Duncan Laing.

At the 1992 Summer Paralympics in Barcelona, she set a new world record in the heat of the 100m freestyle and 50m backstroke and went on to win both finals, she also set a new world record in the 200m medley final in winning gold, she also set world records in the heat and final of the 50m freestyle to win gold. She finished second in the 100m breaststroke behind Japan's world record breaker Outi Hokkanen.

In the 1993 New Year Honours, Newstead was appointed a Member of the Order of the British Empire, for services to sport.

Newstead won two gold and four silver medals at the 1994 world championships in Malta.

At the 1996 Summer Paralympics in Atlanta, USA she won the 100m backstroke and 200m freestyle and also made up for her silver in the last games by breaking the world record on her way to a gold medal in the 100m breaststroke. She was beaten by France's world-record breaker Beatrice Hess in the 200m medley winning silver. She also won a bronze medal in the 100m freestyle, having broken the world record in the heat only to see Jeanette Esling of Great Britain swim even faster. She finished fourth in the 50m freestyle, the only time she failed to medal in eleven events at the Paralympics.

In her swimming career, Newstead broke a total of 37 world records. She retired from Paralympics competition in 1997 after a wheelchair accident in which she lost the use of her right arm.

Newstead featured in the New Zealand television documentaries 12 Days Of Glory - The Forgotten Athletes (1993) and Triumph of the Human Spirit (1996), narrated by Paul Holmes.

Newstead is an integrated dance educator at the University of Otago in Dunedin. At the Dunedin Fringe Festival in March 2013 an aerial troupe including Newstead wowed the crowd with a spectacular silk routine, suspended from a crane nine metres above the Octagon.
