= Éric Lindmann =

French Paralympic swimmer

Personal information
- Full name: Éric Roger Virgile Lindmann
- Born: 25 January 1975 (age 51) Saint-Étienne, France
- Height: 1.85 m (6 ft 1 in)
- Spouse: Hélène Fournet

Sport
- Country: France
- Sport: Paralympic swimming
- Disability class: S7
- Club: Handisport Rennes Club
Medal record
Paralympic swimming
Representing France
Paralympic Games
Gold medal – first place	1992 Barcelona	Men's 400m freestyle S7
Gold medal – first place	1992 Barcelona	Men's 200m individual medley SM6
Gold medal – first place	1992 Barcelona	Men's 4x50m medley relay S1-6
Gold medal – first place	1996 Atlanta	Men's 100m freestyle S7
Gold medal – first place	1996 Atlanta	Men's 400m freestyle S7
Gold medal – first place	1996 Atlanta	Men's 100m backstroke S7
Gold medal – first place	1996 Atlanta	Men's 200m individual medley SM7
Gold medal – first place	2000 Sydney	Men's 200m individual medley SM7
Silver medal – second place	1992 Barcelona	Men's 100m backstroke S7
Silver medal – second place	1992 Barcelona	Men's 4x50m freestyle relay S1-6
Silver medal – second place	1996 Atlanta	Men's 50m freestyle S7
Silver medal – second place	2000 Sydney	Men's 100m breaststroke SB6
Bronze medal – third place	1992 Barcelona	Men's 100m freestyle S7
Bronze medal – third place	1992 Barcelona	Men's 100m breaststroke SB5
Bronze medal – third place	2000 Sydney	Men's 400m freestyle S7
Bronze medal – third place	2004 Athens	Men's 100m backstroke S7
Bronze medal – third place	2004 Athens	Men's 100m breaststroke SB6
Bronze medal – third place	2004 Athens	Men's 200m individual medley SM7
World Championships
Gold medal – first place	1994 Malta	Men's 100m backstroke S7
Gold medal – first place	1994 Malta	Men's 400m freestyle S7
Gold medal – first place	1994 Malta	Men's 200m individual medley SM7
Gold medal – first place	1994 Malta	Men's 4x50m medley relay S1-6
Gold medal – first place	2002 Mar del Plata	Men's 200m individual medley SM7
Silver medal – second place	2002 Mar del Plata	Men's 100m backstroke S7
Silver medal – second place	2002 Mar del Plata	Men's 100m breaststroke SB6
Bronze medal – third place	1998 Christchurch	Men's 400m freestyle S7

Éric Roger Virgile Lindmann (born 25 January 1975) is a retired French Paralympic swimmer who competed in international level events.
