= Janice Burton =

British Paralympic swimmer

Janice Burton MBE
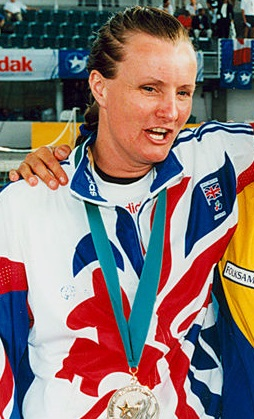

Personal information
- Born: 11 April 1958 (age 68)

Sport
- Country: United Kingdom
- Sport: Paralympic swimming
Medal record
Paralympic Games
Gold medal – first place	1984 Stoke Mandeville/New York	Women's 50 m Breaststroke B1
Gold medal – first place	1988 Seoul	50 m Freestyle B1
Gold medal – first place	1992 Barcelona	100 m Backstroke B1
Gold medal – first place	1992 Barcelona	200 m Medley B1
Gold medal – first place	1992 Barcelona	50 m Freestyle B1
Silver medal – second place	1984 Stoke Mandeville/New York	100 m Backstroke B1
Silver medal – second place	1984 Stoke Mandeville/New York	400 m Individual Medley B1
Silver medal – second place	1988 Seoul	100 m Backstroke B1
Silver medal – second place	1988 Seoul	200 m Individual Medley B1
Silver medal – second place	1988 Seoul	400 m Freestyle B1
Silver medal – second place	1992 Barcelona	100 m Butterfly B1
Silver medal – second place	1992 Barcelona	100 m Freestyle B1
Silver medal – second place	1992 Barcelona	400 m Freestyle B1
Silver medal – second place	1992 Barcelona	4x100 m Freestyle B1-3
Silver medal – second place	1996 Atlanta	4x100 m Freestyle B1-3
Bronze medal – third place	1984 Stoke Mandeville/New York	100 m Freestyle B1
Bronze medal – third place	1988 Seoul	100 m Butterfly B1
Bronze medal – third place	1988 Seoul	100 m Freestyle B1
Bronze medal – third place	1996 Atlanta	100 m Butterfly B1
Bronze medal – third place	1996 Atlanta	50 m Freestyle B1

Janice Burton MBE (born 11 April 1958) is a retired British Paralympic swimmer. Burton competed in B1 events having completely lost sight in both of her eyes. She won a total of 23^{a} Paralympic medals during a career that spanned four Games. As of 2021, Burton remains the second most decorated British Paralympian after cyclist and former swimmer Dame Sarah Storey, and the most decorated British Paralympian in a single sport.

In a career that spanned both the pre- and post- IPC era, Burton competed in both individual and relay races. In the individual events she won five gold medals with three coming in the 1992 Games in Barcelona. As well as achieving Paralympic success she also triumphed in European and World competitions, being crowned champion a total of 15 times.

Burton was appointed a Member of the Order of the British Empire (MBE) in the 1999 New Year Honours list "for services to Sport, especially Swimming, for Visually Impaired People." Since retiring from competitive swimming Janice undertakes public speaking for Guide Dogs and about her Paralympic career. She has also taken part in the display events at the Horse of the Year Show. Burton's sporting retirement coincided with a dedication to further physical challenges despite her disability; at 40 years of age Burton learned to water ski, at 50 she learned to snow ski, and at 60 took up zip wiring.

== Notes ==
^a The British Paralympic Association states that Burton has won 23 medals but the Official Paralympic results service only lists 20 results. This is due to Burton's participation in relay races where the competitors' names were not listed in the database.
