= Priya Cooper =

Australian Paralympic swimmer (born 1974)

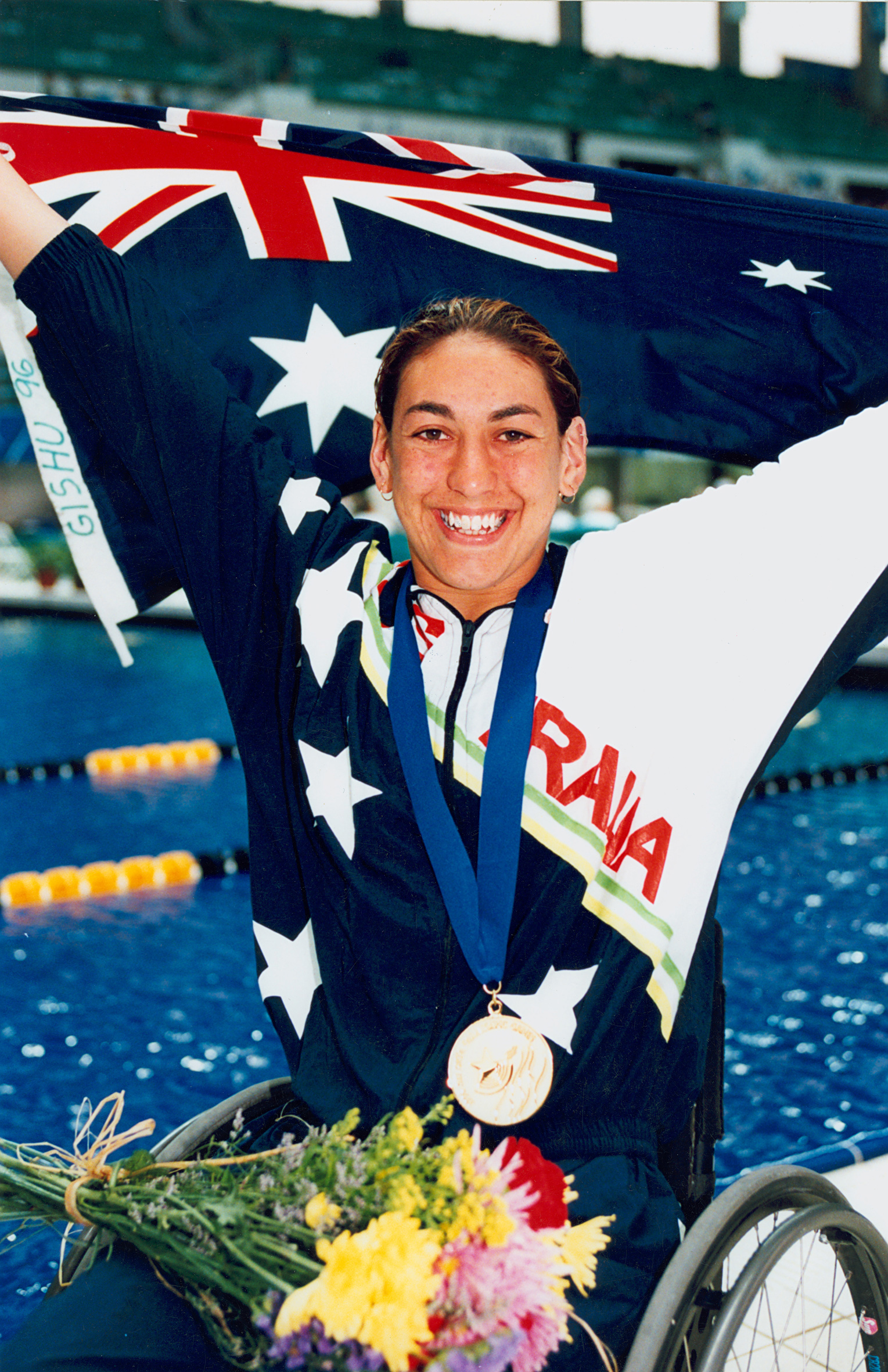
- Cooper in 1996

Personal information
- Full name: Priya Naree Cooper
- Nationality: Australian
- Born: 2 October 1974 (age 52) South Perth, Western Australia

Sport
- Sport: Swimming
- Strokes: Backstroke, individual medley, freestyle, butterfly
- Club: Swan Hills Swimming Club
Medal record
Event	1st	2nd	3rd
Paralympic Games	9	3	4
World Championships (LC)	8	2	0
Total	17	5	4
Representing Australia
Women's swimming
Paralympic Games
Gold medal – first place	1992 Barcelona	50 m freestyle
Gold medal – first place	1992 Barcelona	100 m freestyle
Gold medal – first place	1992 Barcelona	200 m individual medley
Gold medal – first place	1996 Atlanta	100 m freestyle
Gold medal – first place	1996 Atlanta	400 m freestyle
Gold medal – first place	1996 Atlanta	100 m backstroke
Gold medal – first place	1996 Atlanta	200 m individual medley
Gold medal – first place	1996 Atlanta	4 × 100 m freestyle relay
Gold medal – first place	2000 Sydney	400 m freestyle
Silver medal – second place	1992 Barcelona	100 m backstroke
Silver medal – second place	1992 Barcelona	400 m freestyle
Silver medal – second place	1996 Atlanta	50 m freestyle
Bronze medal – third place	1996 Atlanta	100 m butterfly S8
Bronze medal – third place	2000 Sydney	100 m freestyle S8
Bronze medal – third place	2000 Sydney	4 × 100 m freestyle relay 34 pts
Bronze medal – third place	2000 Sydney	4 × 100 m medley relay 34 pts
IPC Swimming World Championships
Gold medal – first place	1994 Valletta	50 m freestyle S8
Gold medal – first place	1994 Valletta	100 m freestyle S8
Gold medal – first place	1994 Valletta	400 m freestyle S8
Gold medal – first place	1994 Valletta	200 m individual medley SM7
Gold medal – first place	1994 Valletta	100 m backstroke S8
Gold medal – first place	1998 Christchurch	100 m freestyle S8
Gold medal – first place	1998 Christchurch	400 m freestyle S8
Gold medal – first place	1998 Christchurch	200 m individual medley SM7
Silver medal – second place	1998 Christchurch	100 m backstroke S8
Silver medal – second place	1998 Christchurch	4 × 100 m freestyle relay Open

Priya Naree Cooper, OAM (born 2 October 1974) is an Australian world champion disabled swimmer, winning nine Paralympic gold medals as well as world records and world championships. She competed in the Australian swimming team at the 1992, 1996 and 2000 Summer Paralympics with an S8 classification. She was twice the co-captain of the Australian Paralympic team, including at the 2000 Paralympic Games in Sydney, and carried the Australian flag at the closing ceremonies for the 1992 and 1996 Summer Paralympics. Cooper has cerebral palsy and spends much of her time in a wheelchair. She attended university, working on a course in health management. After she ended her competitive Paralympic career, she became a commentator, and covered the swimming events at the 2002 Commonwealth Games.

== Early life ==
Priya Naree Cooper was born on 2 October 1974 in Perth, Western Australia. She was born with cerebral palsy, and spends 75% of her time in a wheelchair. As a youngster, she was encouraged by her mother to try out several sports, including tap dancing and ballet.

With her father's encouragement, Cooper first started swimming in her backyard pool when she was six years old. Her first swimsuit was a bikini. Her father taught her to swim while making her wear big yellow floaties. She started competitive swimming at school carnivals. In the first carnival she competed in, she finished sixth in the F-division 50 m butterfly. She was informed about disabled athletes by a teacher at school. Her initial reaction to learning about disabled sport was to question if she was "disabled enough" to compete. She made her first national team appearance when she was in year 12 in school, after winning twelve gold medals in national swimming meets. By that time, Cooper had already begun serious training, waking up at 4 a.m. to make sure she had time in the pool.

== Competitive athletic career ==
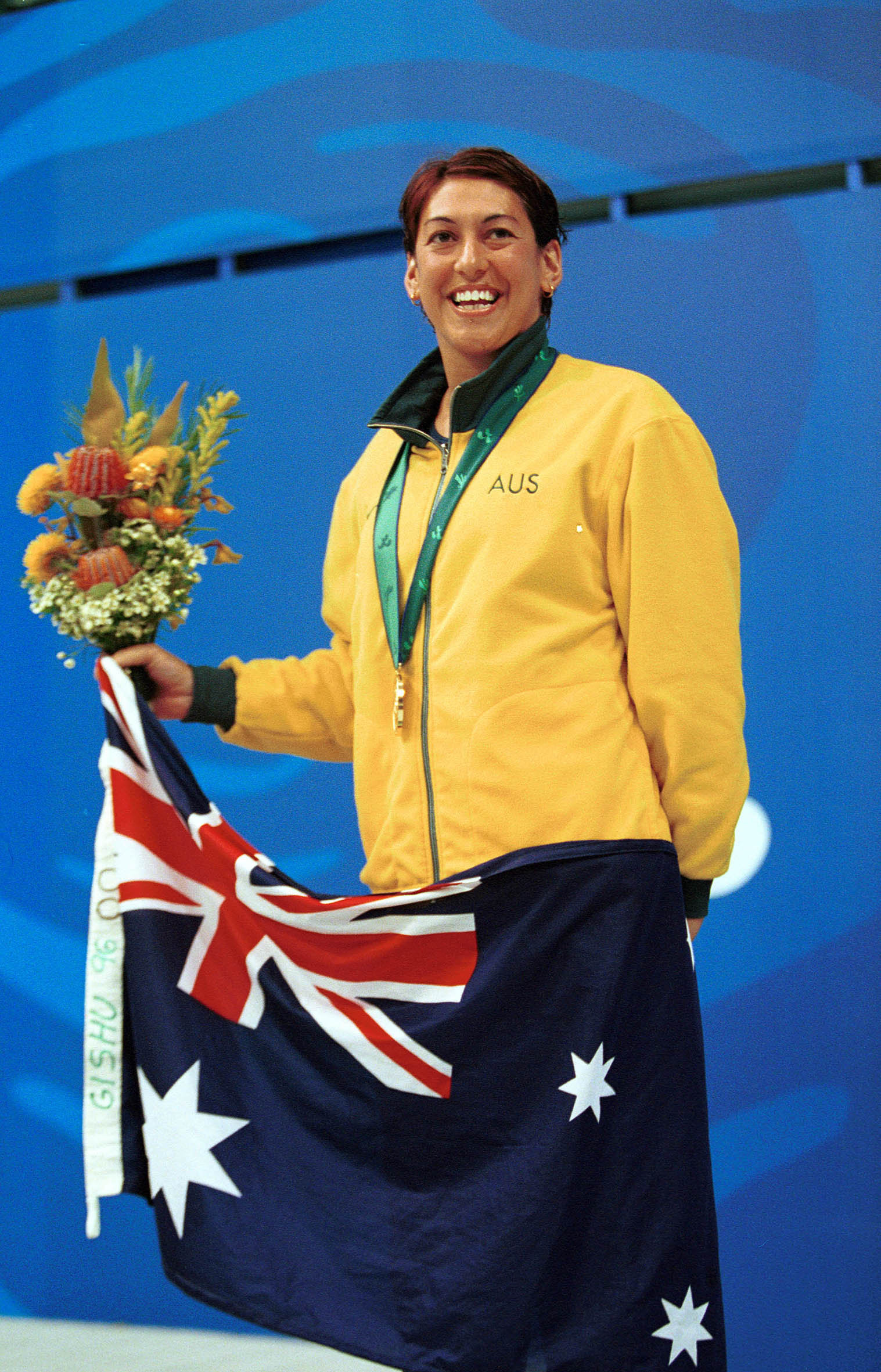
Cooper shown smiling on the gold medal podium for her win in the 400 m freestyle S8 at the 2000 Summer Paralympics

Cooper is a world champion disabled swimmer, winning nine Paralympic gold medals as well as world records and world championships. She represented Wheelchair Sports Western Australia at the 1991 National Wheelchair Games, winning nine gold medals. Her home pool was the Swan Park Leisure Centre in Midvale, Western Australia. She had a number of coaches over the course of her competitive career, including Matthew Brown and Frank Ponta.

At the age of 17, Cooper made her Paralympic debut at the 1992 Summer Paralympics in Barcelona. She was in danger of not going to the 1992 Paralympics because of funding issues for the Australian Paralympic Federation. The Federation made an emergency appeal for funding from the public in order to cover the cost of transporting the Australian team to Barcelona. A variety of small donations allowed Cooper and other Australian athletes to compete. She won three gold and two silver medals, and broke two world records and three Paralympic records. She was offered a non-residential Australian Institute of Sport Athletes with a Disability swimming scholarship in 1993 and was supported until 2000.

Cooper was a co-captain of the Australian team at the 1996 Summer Paralympics, where she competed in six individual events and two relay events in the S8 class, winning five gold medals, four individual and one team, one silver medal and one bronze medal. She set world records at the 1996 Paralympic Games in Atlanta in the 200 m medley and the 400 m freestyle swimming events. She also set personal bests in the 100 m backstroke and 100 m freestyle. Her world record time in the 400 m freestyle was 5:11.47, her 100 m backstroke time was 1:23.43, and her 100 m freestyle time was 1:12.08.

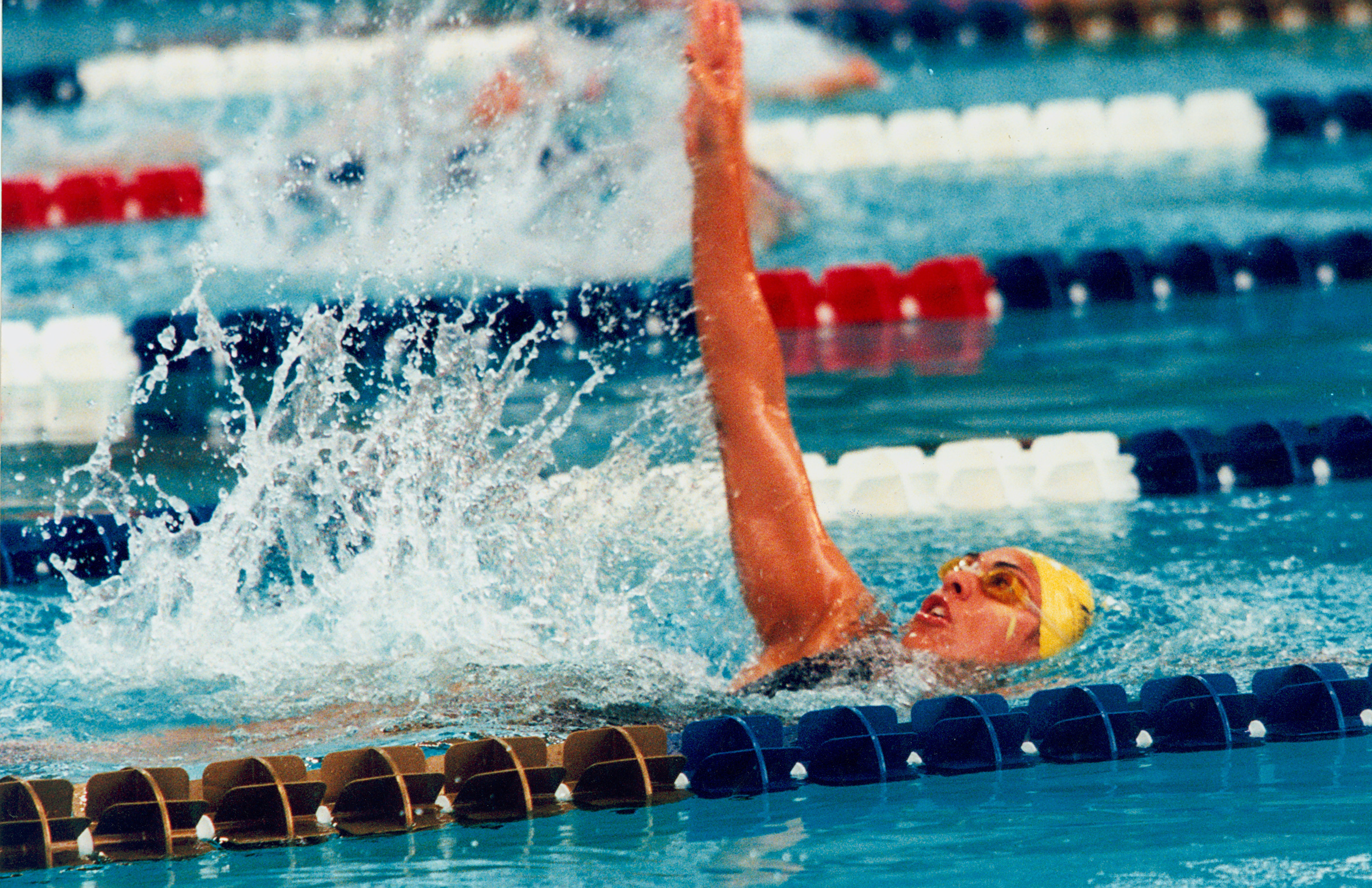
Australian swimmer Priya Cooper competes in backstroke in the S8 class at the 1996 Atlanta Paralympic Games

In 1998, Cooper competed at the Paralympic Swimming World Championships in Christchurch, New Zealand. She set a world record in the 400m freestyle at the event. She set another world record in the S8 classification, with an 800m freestyle time of 10:40.03, three seconds faster than the previous record. She also won a gold medal in the 200m individual medley, with a finish that was half a second away from beating her own previous world record.

Cooper competed at the Sporting Wheelies and Disabled Association-sponsored 1998 Queensland Championships in five swimming events. She and Brad Thomas were invited to attend as special guest competitors. While attending, Cooper also hosted a coaching clinic with Thomas.

In 1999, Cooper moved to Sydney, the location of the 2000 Summer Paralympics, to prepare for the Games. She had been living there for eighteen months at the beginning of the Games. Her family continued to live in Perth and the move was an adjustment period for her. She helped to make several instructional videos for the Sydney Organising Committee for the Olympic Games (SOCOG) to help train volunteers for the Games. In preparation for the 2000 Paralympics, the Australian Paralympic Committee created a CD to help with fundraising. She participated in this by choosing the song "Ashes" by The Superjesus and singing it onstage during the CD's launch.

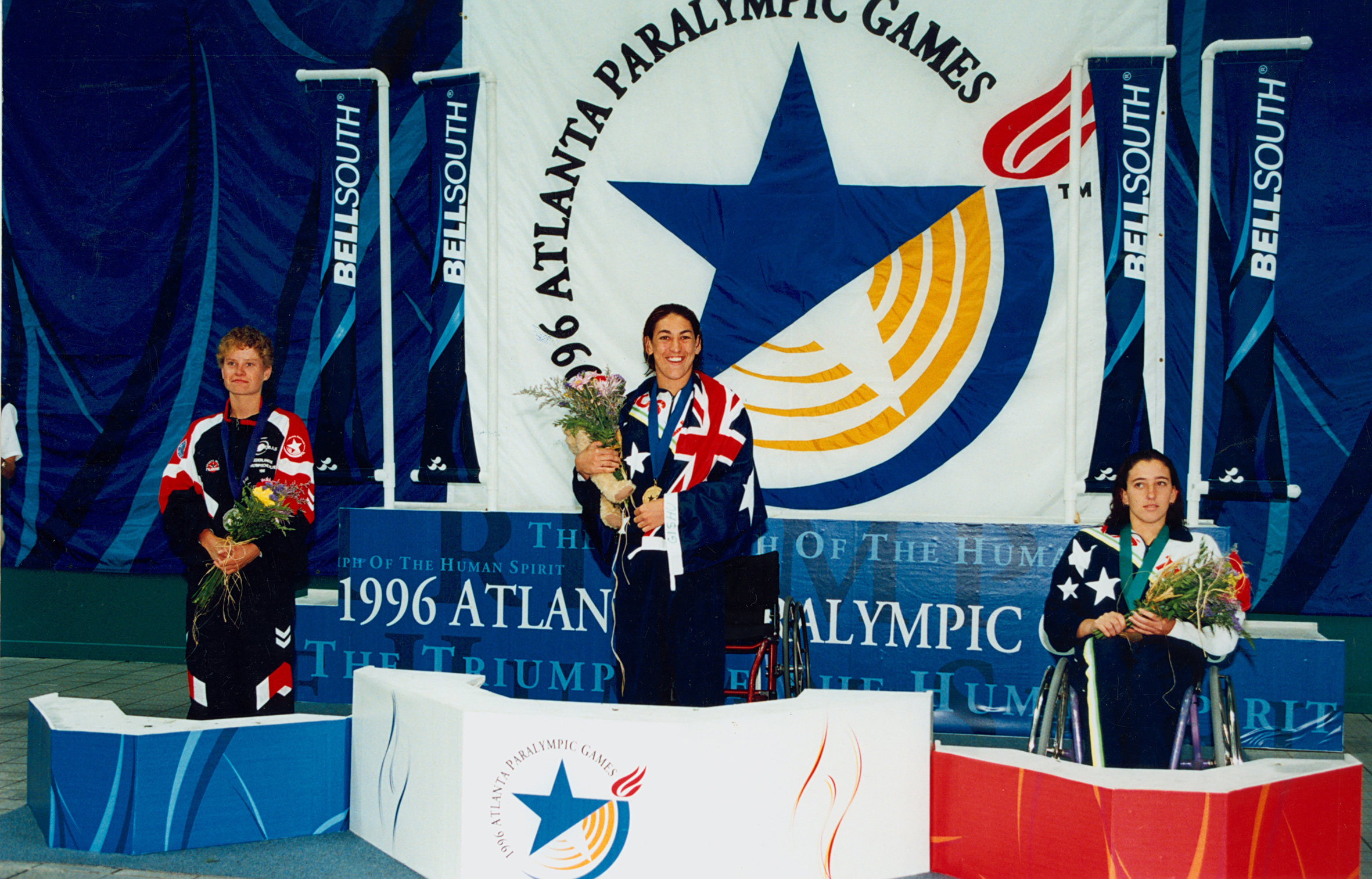
Australian swimmers Priya Cooper (gold) and Janelle Falzon (bronze) on the medal dais at the 1996 Atlanta Paralympic Games

At the 2000 Summer Paralympics, her last games, she was the co-captain of the Australian Paralympic team. Coming into the 2000 Games, there were some concerns that she would not be able to compete because of a shoulder injury. She was worried about how receptive Australians and the world would be in terms of disabled sport prior to the Paralympics being hosted in Australia. She was surprised when the Paralympic Games started at how supportive Australians and international visitors were of athletes at the 2000 Paralympic Games. She won the 400 m freestyle and took three bronze medals in the 100 m freestyle, 4 x 100 m freestyle relay and 4 x 100 m medley relay events. After the Games, Cooper believed that they had a long reaching societal impact in terms of creating a better image for disabled people around the country and helping to increase acceptance of them as part of Australian society. She also believed that the Games would help increase spectatorship for Paralympic sports around the country.

Cooper's swimming style relied on upper body strength, with her legs trailing behind her. Despite her love of water, Cooper had a fear of swimming in the open water of the ocean. To help overcome this fear, she competed in the 2002 open water 20 kilometres (12 mi) Rottnest Channel Swim in Western Australia. She later took up para ice hockey, becoming a member of the Australian team at the Women's World Para Ice Hockey Championships in 2025 in Dolný Kubín in Slovakia and 2026 in Newcastle in Australia.

== Recognition ==
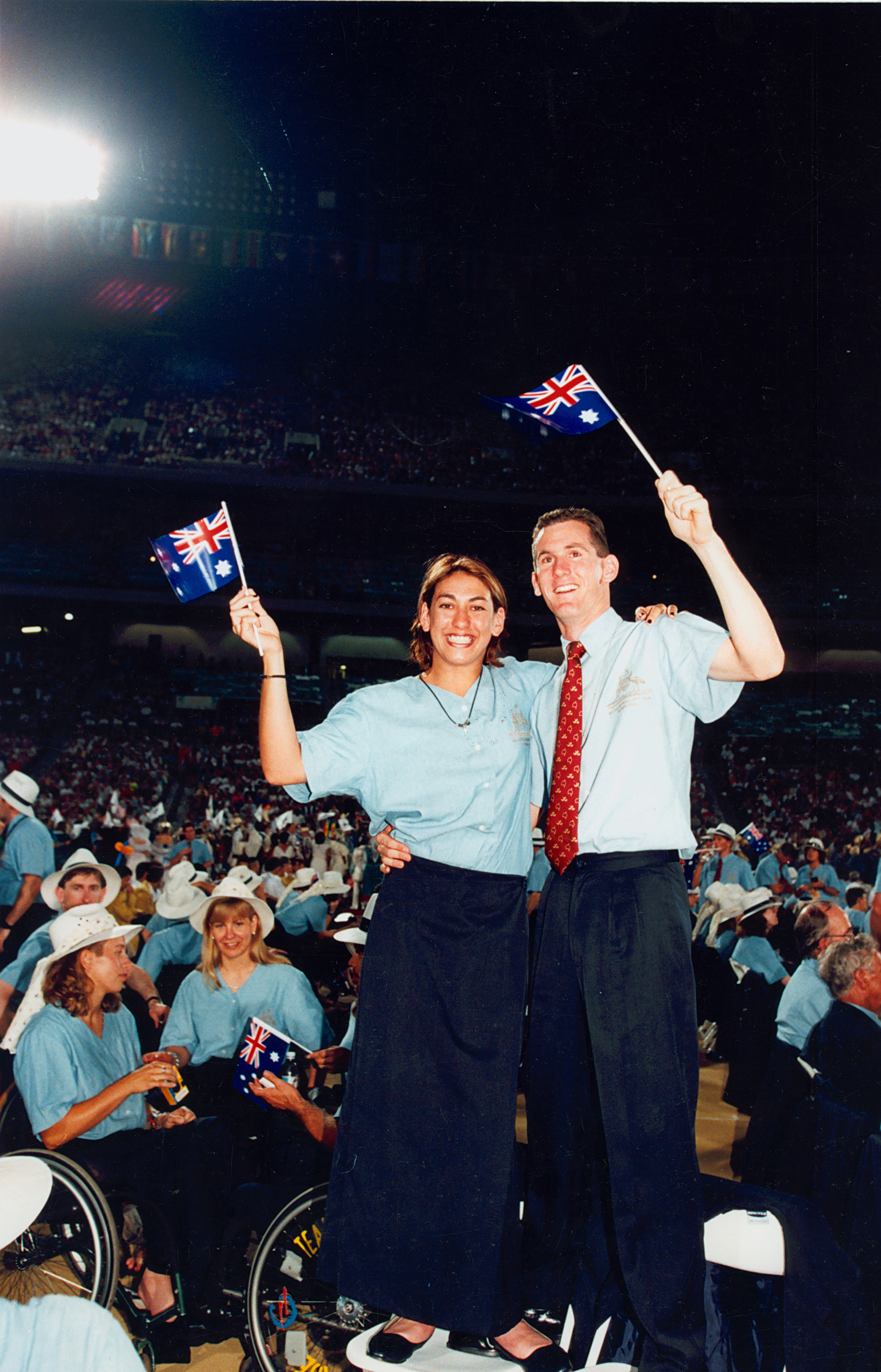
Cooper with a teammate at the opening ceremony of the 1996 Atlanta Paralympic Games

Cooper was selected to carry the Australian flag at the closing ceremonies for the 1992 and 1996 Summer Paralympics. She was awarded a Medal of the Order of Australia in 1993, was named the 1995 Paralympian of the Year, was the Young Australian of the Year for Sport in 1999, received an Australian Sports Medal in 2000, and was inducted into the Western Australian Hall of Champions in 2006 and the Swimming Western Australia Hall of Fame in 2008. In 1998, Cooper won a Dairy Farmers Sporting Chance award in swimming. That year, she also won a Curtin University of Technology John Curtin Medal. In 1999, she won the APC Merit Award.

Cooper was chosen to officially open the Stadium at Curtin University in 2009. She attended the tenth anniversary celebrations for the Sydney Olympic and Paralympic Games held at Sydney Olympic Park in 2010.

In October 2015, she became the fourth Paralympian to be inducted into the Sport Australia Hall of Fame.

In 2022, she was inducted into Paralympics Australia Hall of Fame. In November 2023, Cooper was up[graded to Legend status in Western Australian Hall of Champions. In 2024, inducted into Swimming Australia Hall of Fame.

== Personal life ==
Cooper studied at Curtin University, where she graduated with a degree in health promotion and media. She was also a public speaker, attending events to talk about disabilities. Cooper had a volunteer position, where she worked as a scriptwriter for a radio station in Perth.

Cooper was a commentator for the 2002 Commonwealth Games, covering the swimming events. She is a Therapy Focus Ambassador, and a member of the Disabilities and Carer Council. She is actively involved in raising funds for several charities, and was part of the Great Pram Push event held in East Fremantle, Western Australia, a charity event that raised funds for the Starlight Children's Foundation and the Children's Leukaemia and Cancer Research Foundation.

In 2022, she was appointed chair of the Western Australian Institute of Sport but resigned in 2023.

Cooper is married to Paralympic swimmer Rodney Bonsack and has two children. Bonsack had both legs severed above the knees in an aircraft accident in 1987. Cooper and her husband run a motivational business, Success is a Choice Global, which is designed to help people maximise their lives.
