= Denmark at the 1992 Summer Paralympics =

- IPC code: DEN
- NPC: Paralympic Committee Denmark
- Website: www.paralympic.dk

in Barcelona
- Competitors: 43
- Medals Ranked 14th: Gold 12 Silver 22 Bronze 12 Total 46

Summer Paralympics appearances (overview)
- 1968; 1972; 1976; 1980; 1984; 1988; 1992; 1996; 2000; 2004; 2008; 2012; 2016; 2020; 2024

Denmark competed at the 1992 Summer Paralympics in Barcelona, Spain. 43 competitors from Denmark won 46 medals including 12 gold, 22 silver and 12 bronze and finished 11th in the medal table.

== See also ==
- Denmark at the Paralympics
- Denmark at the 1992 Summer Olympics
