= Swimming at the 1996 Summer Paralympics =

Swimming at the X Paralympic Games
- Paralympic Swimming
- Venue: Georgia Tech Campus Recreation Center
- Dates: August 16 to 26, 1996

Paralympic symbol (1994-2004)

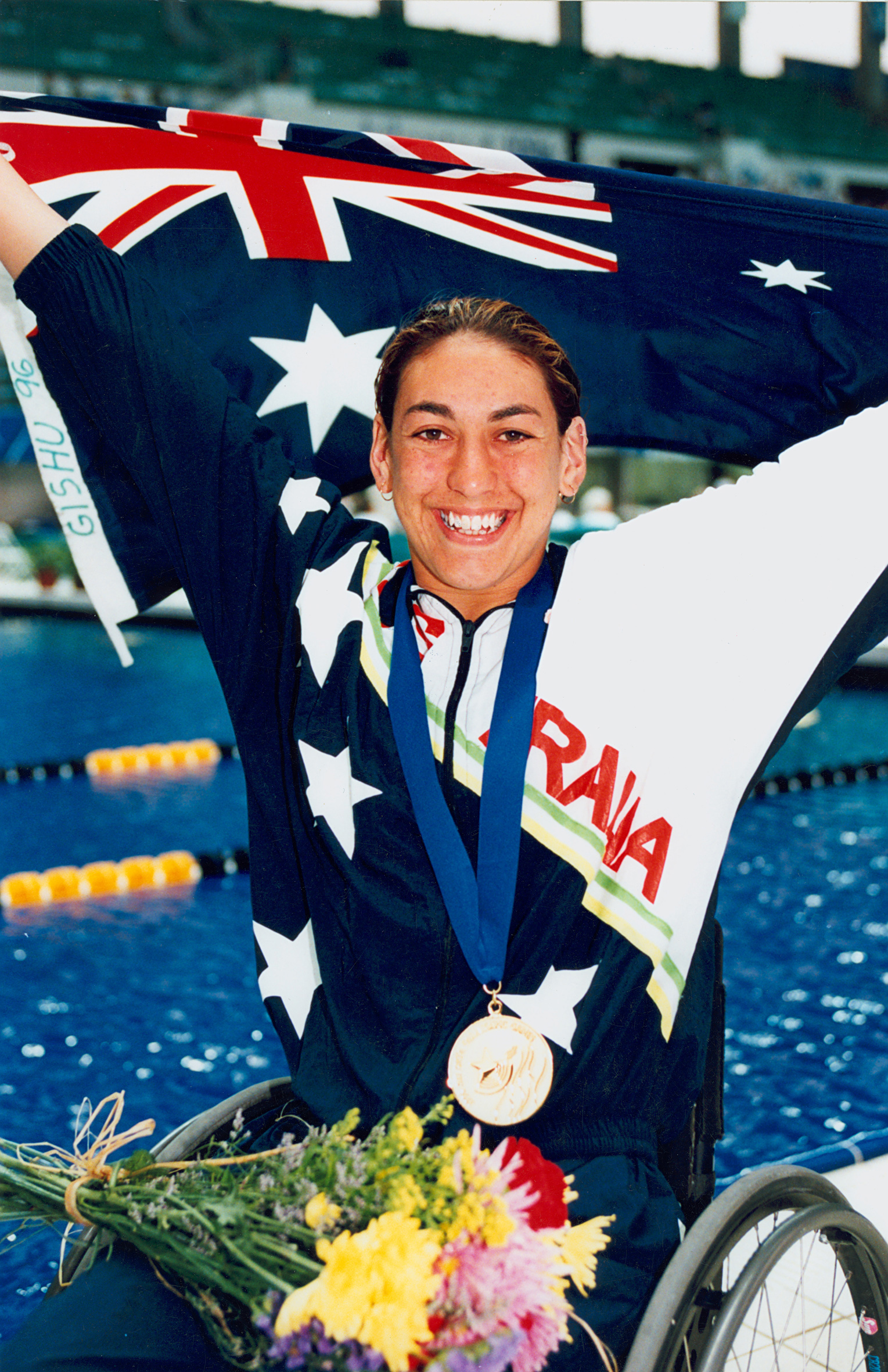
Australian gold medalist Priya Cooper after presentation ceremony

Swimming at the 1996 Summer Paralympics consisted of 168 events, 87 for men and 81 for women. Because of a tie in the men's 100 m freestyle S4 event, a total of 169 bronze medals were awarded.

The 1996 Summer Paralympics in Atlanta were the first ones where swimming was fully integrated based on functional disability, with classification no longer separated into classes based on the four disability types of vision impaired, cerebral palsy, amputee, and wheelchair sport. Countries no longer had multiple national swimming teams based on disability type but instead had one mixed disability national team.

== Medal table ==
Rank	Nation	Gold	Silver	Bronze	Total
1	Germany (GER)	19	23	14	56
2	Great Britain (GBR)	16	17	15	48
3	Australia (AUS)	16	16	12	44
4	United States (USA)	16	13	16	45
5	Spain (ESP)	15	12	14	41
6	France (FRA)	12	8	5	25
7	Netherlands (NED)	11	8	10	29
8	Canada (CAN)	9	2	8	19
9	Norway (NOR)	7	6	1	14
10	New Zealand (NZL)	7	3	2	12
11	Denmark (DEN)	5	10	14	29
12	Japan (JPN)	5	3	4	12
13	Iceland (ISL)	5	1	5	11
14	Sweden (SWE)	4	4	3	11
15	Poland (POL)	3	5	4	12
16	China (CHN)	3	3	4	10
17	Italy (ITA)	2	4	1	7
18	Belgium (BEL)	2	3	2	7
19	South Africa (RSA)	2	2	4	8
20	Estonia (EST)	2	2	0	4
21	Hungary (HUN)	2	1	3	6
22	Russia (RUS)	1	2	5	8
23	Argentina (ARG)	1	2	1	4
24	Brazil (BRA)	1	1	7	9
25	Slovakia (SVK)	1	1	2	4
26	Czech Republic (CZE)	1	0	0	1
26	Peru (PER)	1	0	0	1
28	Ukraine (UKR)	0	3	1	4
29	Finland (FIN)	0	2	2	4
30	Portugal (POR)	0	2	1	3
31	Ireland (IRL)	0	2	0	2
32	Israel (ISR)	0	1	3	4
33	Egypt (EGY)	0	1	1	2
33	Greece (GRE)	0	1	1	2
35	Bulgaria (BUL)	0	1	0	1
35	Switzerland (SUI)	0	1	0	1
35	Yugoslavia (YUG)	0	1	0	1
38	Slovenia (SLO)	0	0	2	2
39	South Korea (KOR)	0	0	1	1
39	Thailand (THA)	0	0	1	1
Totals (40 entries)		169	167	169	505

=== Participating nations ===
- Argentina (8)
- Australia (30)
- Belarus (2)
- Belgium (4)
- Brazil (11)
- Bulgaria (1)
- Canada (13)
- Chile (1)
- China (11)
- Chinese Taipei (3)
- Croatia (2)
- Cuba (2)
- Cyprus (1)
- Czech Republic (2)
- Denmark (14)
- Egypt (5)
- Estonia (4)
- Faroe Islands (1)
- Finland (4)
- France (16)
- Germany (28)
- Great Britain (53)
- Greece (5)
- Hungary (10)
- Iceland (8)
- Ireland (3)
- Israel (7)
- Italy (7)
- Japan (7)
- Kuwait (1)
- Malaysia (1)
- Mexico (4)
- Netherlands (19)
- New Zealand (7)
- Norway (8)
- Peru (2)
- Poland (8)
- Portugal (6)
- Russia (10)
- Slovakia (5)
- Slovenia (1)
- South Africa (8)
- South Korea (2)
- Spain (41)
- Sweden (17)
- Switzerland (3)
- Thailand (1)
- Ukraine (7)
- United States (42)
- Yugoslavia (1)

== Medal summary ==
=== Men's events ===
Event	Gold	Silver	Bronze
50 m backstroke S2	James Anderson; Great Britain	Miroslaw Piesak; Poland	Alan McGregor; Great Britain
50 m backstroke S3	Albert Bakaev; Russia	Claude Badie; France	Petter Edstrom; Sweden
50 m backstroke S4	Luca Pancalli; Italy	Pierre Bellot; France	Craig Laufenberg; United States
50 m backstroke S5	Zsolt Vereczkei; Hungary	Essam Attia; Egypt	Pascal Pinard; France
50 m breaststroke SB2	James Thompson; United States	Nenad Krisanovic; Yugoslavia	Andrej Zatko; Slovakia
50 m breaststroke SB3	Christian Fritsche; Germany	John Petersson; Denmark	Garth Harris; Canada
50 m butterfly S3	Andrej Zatko; Slovakia	Kenneth Cairns; Great Britain	Antonios Giapoutzis; Greece
50 m butterfly S4	Luca Pancalli; Italy	Christian Fritsche; Germany	John Petersson; Denmark
50 m butterfly S5	Daniel Butler; United States	Qiwen Mao; China	Pascal Pinard; France
50 m butterfly S6	Duane Kale; New Zealand	Kai Xia; China	Peter Lund Andersen; Denmark
50 m butterfly S7	José Arnulfo Medeiros; Brazil	Daniel Kunzi; Switzerland	Walid Abd Elkader; Egypt
50 m freestyle B1	Junichi Kawai; Japan	Izhar Cohen; Israel	Daniel Kelly; United States
50 m freestyle B2	Christopher Holmes; Great Britain	Pablo Corral; Spain	Ziv Better; Israel
50 m freestyle B3	Ebert Kleynhans; South Africa	Noel Pedersen; Norway	Walter Wu; Canada
50 m freestyle MH	Alwin Houtsma; Netherlands	Grant Fitzpatrick; Australia	Craig Groenewald; South Africa
50 m freestyle S10	Alwin de Groot; Netherlands	Stefan Loeffler; Germany	Scott Brockenshire; Australia
50 m freestyle S2	Miroslaw Peisak; Poland	James Anderson; Great Britain	Adriano Pereira; Brazil
50 m freestyle S3	Jaime Eulert; Peru	Albert Bakaev; Russia	Petter Edstrom; Sweden
50 m freestyle S4	Ricardo Oribe; Spain	Luca Pancalli; Italy	Akinobu Aoki; Japan
50 m freestyle S5	Juan Fuertes; Spain	Lars Lürig; Germany	Krzysztof Sleczka; Poland
50 m freestyle S6	Peter Lund Andersen; Denmark	Duane Kale; New Zealand	Adriano Lima; Brazil
50 m freestyle S7	Tony Alexander; Canada	Eric Lindmann; France	Jesus Iglesias; Spain
50 m freestyle S8	Emil Broendum; Denmark	Konstantinos Fykas; Greece	Holger Kimmig; Germany
50 m freestyle S9	Brendan Burkett; Australia	Rutger Sturkenboom; Netherlands	Luis Alicea; United States
100 m backstroke B1	Daniel Kelly; United States	Junichi Kawai; Japan	Birkir Gunnarsson; Iceland
100 m backstroke B2	Christopher Holmes; Great Britain	Francisco Segarra; Spain	Ziv Better; Israel
100 m backstroke B3	Walter Wu; Canada	Noel Pedersen; Norway	Jurgen Lentink; Netherlands
100 m backstroke S6	Weiming Zhu; China	Gregory Burns; United States	Duane Kale; New Zealand
100 m backstroke S7	Eric Lindmann; France	Andrew Lindsay; Great Britain	Soo Bok Kim; South Korea
100 m backstroke S8	Holger Kimmig; Germany	Kasper Hansen; Denmark	Geert Jaehrig; Germany
100 m backstroke S9	Helge Bjoernstad; Norway	David Malone; Ireland	Detlef Schmidt; Germany
100 m backstroke S10	Alwin de Groot; Netherlands	Marc Woods; Great Britain	Jurjen Engelsman; Netherlands
100 m breaststroke B1	Christian Bundgaard; Denmark	Daniel Kelly; United States	Panom Lagsanaprim; Thailand
100 m breaststroke B2	Kingsley Bugarin; Australia	José Arribas; Spain	Vitali Krylov; Russia
100 m breaststroke B3	Noel Pedersen; Norway	Ivan Nielsen; Denmark	Jurgen Lentink; Netherlands
100 m breaststroke SB4	Pascal Pinard; France	Ricardo Ten; Spain	Ivanildo Vasconcelos; Brazil
100 m breaststroke SB5	Kasper Engel; Netherlands	Tadhg Slattery; South Africa	Aaron Paulson; United States
100 m breaststroke SB6	Jésus Iglesias; Spain	Aaron Bidois; New Zealand	Matthias Schlubeck; Germany
100 m breaststroke SB7	Baoren Gong; China	Sascha Kindred; Great Britain	Laurentius van Geel; Netherlands
100 m breaststroke SB8	Rune Ulvang; Norway	Helge Bjoernstad; Norway	Yongzhong Guo; China
100 m breaststroke SB9	Jurjen Engelsman; Netherlands	Alwin de Groot; Netherlands	Sergey Bestuchev; Russia
100 m breaststroke SB10	Stefan Loeffler; Germany	Tomas Kjellqvist; Sweden	Mario Kofler; Germany
100 m butterfly B2	Jeff Hardy; Australia	Kingsley Bugarin; Australia	Daniel Kelly; United States
100 m butterfly B3	Walter Wu; Canada	Ian Sharpe; Great Britain	Ivan Nielsen; Denmark
100 m butterfly S8	Giles Long; Great Britain	Emil Broendum; Denmark	Jean-Jacques Terblanche; South Africa
100 m butterfly S9	Olafur Eiriksson; Iceland	Aleksei Kapoura; Russia	Andrew Haley; Canada
100 m butterfly S10	Jody Cundy; Great Britain	Alwin de Groot; Netherlands	Scott Brockenshire; Australia
100 m freestyle B1	Junichi Kawai; Japan	Daniel Kelly; United States	Tim Reddish; Great Britain
100 m freestyle B2	Christopher Holmes; Great Britain	Kingsley Bugarin; Australia	Ziv Better; Israel
100 m freestyle B3	Walter Wu; Canada	Ebert Kleynhans; South Africa	Vladimir Tchesnov; Russia
100 m freestyle MH	Alwin Houtsma; Netherlands	Grant Fitzpatrick; Australia	Craig Groenewald; South Africa
100 m freestyle S2	James Anderson; Great Britain	Alan McGregor; Great Britain	Adriano Pereira; Brazil
100 m freestyle S3	Petter Edstrom; Sweden	Palmar Gudmundsson; Iceland	Genezi Andrade; Brazil
100 m freestyle S4	Ricardo Oribe; Spain	Luca Pancalli; Italy	John Petersson; Denmark
100 m freestyle S4	Ricardo Oribe; Spain	Luca Pancalli; Italy	Akinobu Aoki; Japan
100 m freestyle S5	Juan Fuertes; Spain	Lars Lürig; Germany	Krzysztof Sleczka; Poland
100 m freestyle S6	Duane Kale; New Zealand	Peter Lund Andersen; Denmark	Danijel Pavlinec; Slovenia
100 m freestyle S7	Eric Lindmann; France	Tony Alexander; Canada	Yuriy Andryushin; Ukraine
100 m freestyle S8	Emil Broendum; Denmark	Holger Kimmig; Germany	Kasper Hansen; Denmark
100 m freestyle S9	Luis Alicea; United States	Rutger Sturkenboom; Netherlands	Olafur Eiriksson; Iceland
100 m freestyle S10	Alwin de Groot; Netherlands	Stefan Loeffler; Germany	Jurjen Engelsman; Netherlands
150 m medley SM3	Petter Edstrom; Sweden	Genezi Andrade; Brazil	Stig Morten Sandvik; Norway
150 m medley SM4	Javier Torres; Spain	Krzyzstof Sleczka; Poland	John Petersson; Denmark
200 m breaststroke B2	Kingsley Bugarin; Australia	Christian Bundgaard; Denmark	Vitali Krylov; Russia
200 m breaststroke B3	Noel Pedersen; Norway	Ivan Nielsen; Denmark	Andrei Nefedov; Russia
200 m freestyle S3	Palmar Gudmundsson; Iceland	Petter Edstrom; Sweden	Genezi Andrade; Brazil
200 m freestyle S4	Ricardo Oribe; Spain	Luca Pancalli; Italy	James Thompson; United States
200 m freestyle S5	Lars Lürig; Germany	Juan Fuertes; Spain	Krzysztof Sleczka; Poland
200 m freestyle S6	Duane Kale; New Zealand	Peter Lund Andersen; Denmark	Danijel Pavlinec; Slovenia
200 m freestyle S7	Eric Lindmann; France	Simon Ahlstad; Sweden	Gledson Soares; Brazil
200 m medley B1	Daniel Kelly; United States	Tim Reddish; Great Britain	Junichi Kawai; Japan
200 m medley B2	Kingsley Bugarin; Australia	Christopher Holmes; Great Britain	Jeff Hardy; Australia
200 m medley B3	Walter Wu; Canada	Noel Pedersen; Norway	Flemming Berthelsen; Denmark
200 m medley SM5	Arkadiusz Pawlowski; Poland	Pascal Pinard; France	Peter Lund Andersen; Denmark
200 m medley SM6	Duane Kale; New Zealand	Sebastian Xhrouet; Belgium	Thomas Grimm; Germany
200 m medley SM7	Eric Lindmann; France	Simon Ahlstad; Sweden	Gledson Soares; Brazil
200 m medley SM8	Jean-Jacques Terblanche; South Africa	Holger Kimmig; Germany	Giles Long; Great Britain
200 m medley SM9	Helge Bjoernstad; Norway	Rutger Sturkenboom; Netherlands	Olafur Eiriksson; Iceland
200 m medley SM10	Alwin de Groot; Netherlands	Jurjen Engelsman; Netherlands	Stefan Loeffler; Germany
400 m freestyle B2	Jeff Hardy; Australia	Francisco Segarra; Spain	Kingsley Bugarin; Australia
400 m freestyle B3	Walter Wu; Canada	Ivan Nielsen; Denmark	Christopher Fox; Great Britain
400 m freestyle S7	Eric Lindmann; France	Sebastian Xhrouet; Belgium	Frederic Delpy; France
400 m freestyle S8	Jason Wening; United States	Holger Kimmig; Germany	Emil Broendum; Denmark
400 m freestyle S9	Enrique Tornero; Spain	Luis Alicea; United States	Andrew Haley; Canada
400 m freestyle S10	Alwin de Groot; Netherlands	Stefan Loeffler; Germany	Marc Woods; Great Britain
4×50 m freestyle S1–6	United States (USA); Martin Parker; Gregory Burns; Aaron Paulson; James Thompson; Daniel Butler	Spain (ESP); Juan Fuertes; Ricardo Oribe; Jesus Iglesias; Javier Torres	China (CHN); Weiming Zhu; Qiwen Mao; Hua Bin Zeng; Kai Xia
4×50 m medley S1–6	United States (USA); Gregory Burns; Aaron Paulson; Daniel Butler; Martin Parker	China (CHN); Qiwen Mao; Kai Xia; Hua Bin Zeng; Weiming Zhu	Spain (ESP); Ricardo Ten; Jésus Iglesias; Javier Torres; Juan Fuertes
4 × 100 m freestyle S7–10	Germany (GER); Holger Kimmig; Detlef Schmidt; Oliver Anders; Stefan Loeffler	Australia (AUS); Scott Brockenshire; Brendan Burkett; Paul Gockel; Dominic Collins; Cameron de Burgh	Spain (ESP); Pablo Saavedra; Enrique Tornero; Antonio Martorell; Juan Francisco Jimenez
4 × 100 m medley S7–10	Germany (GER); Holger Kimmig; Stefan Loeffler; Detlef Schmidt; Oliver Anders	Great Britain (GBR); Giles Long; Marc Woods; Paul Noble; Shaun Uren; Iain Mathew	Netherlands (NED); Rutger Sturkenboom; Alwin de Groot; Jurjen Engelsman; Kasper Engel; Laurentius van Geel

=== Women's events ===
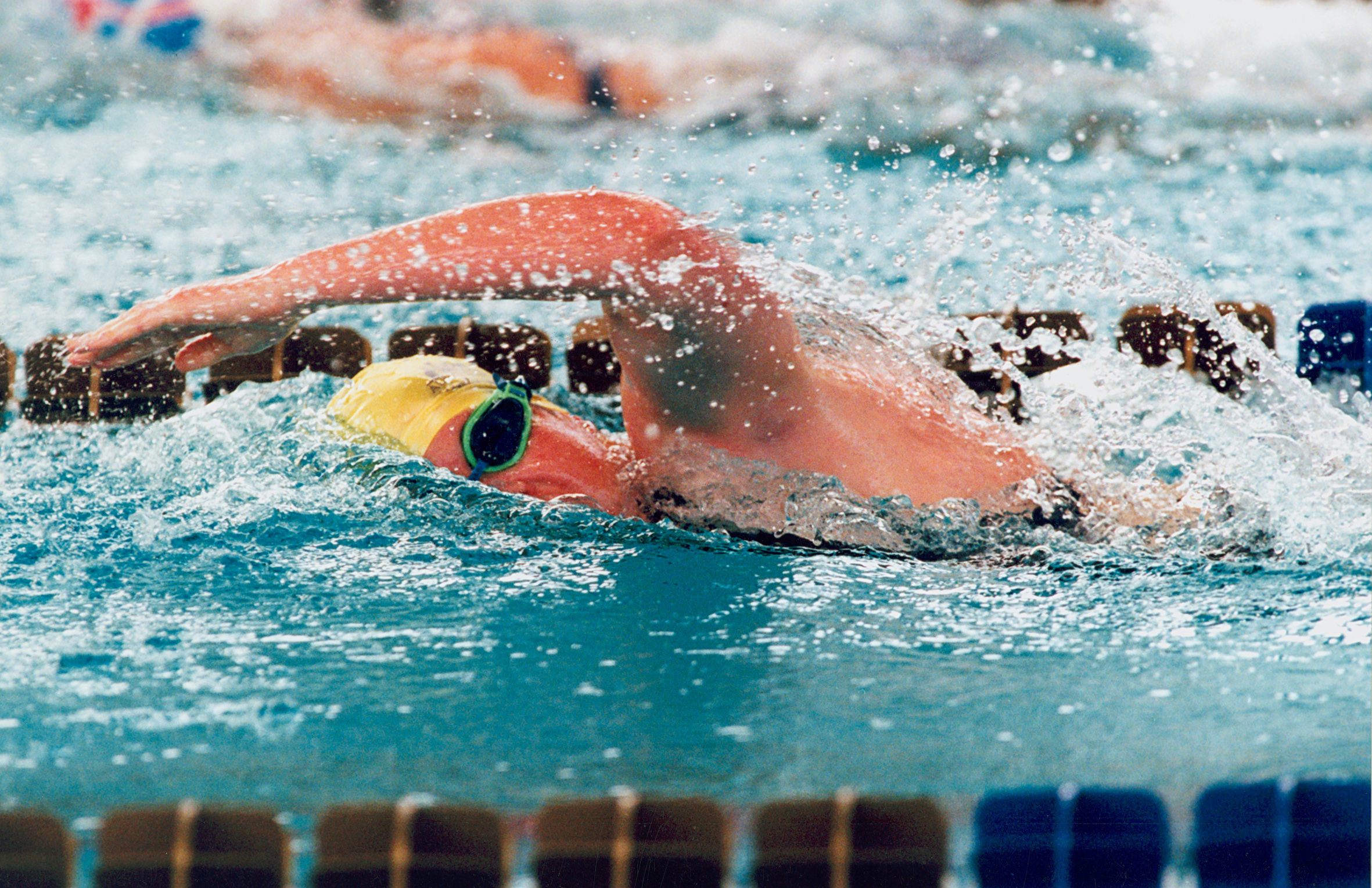
An unidentified Australian swimmer at the 1996 Atlanta Paralympic Games

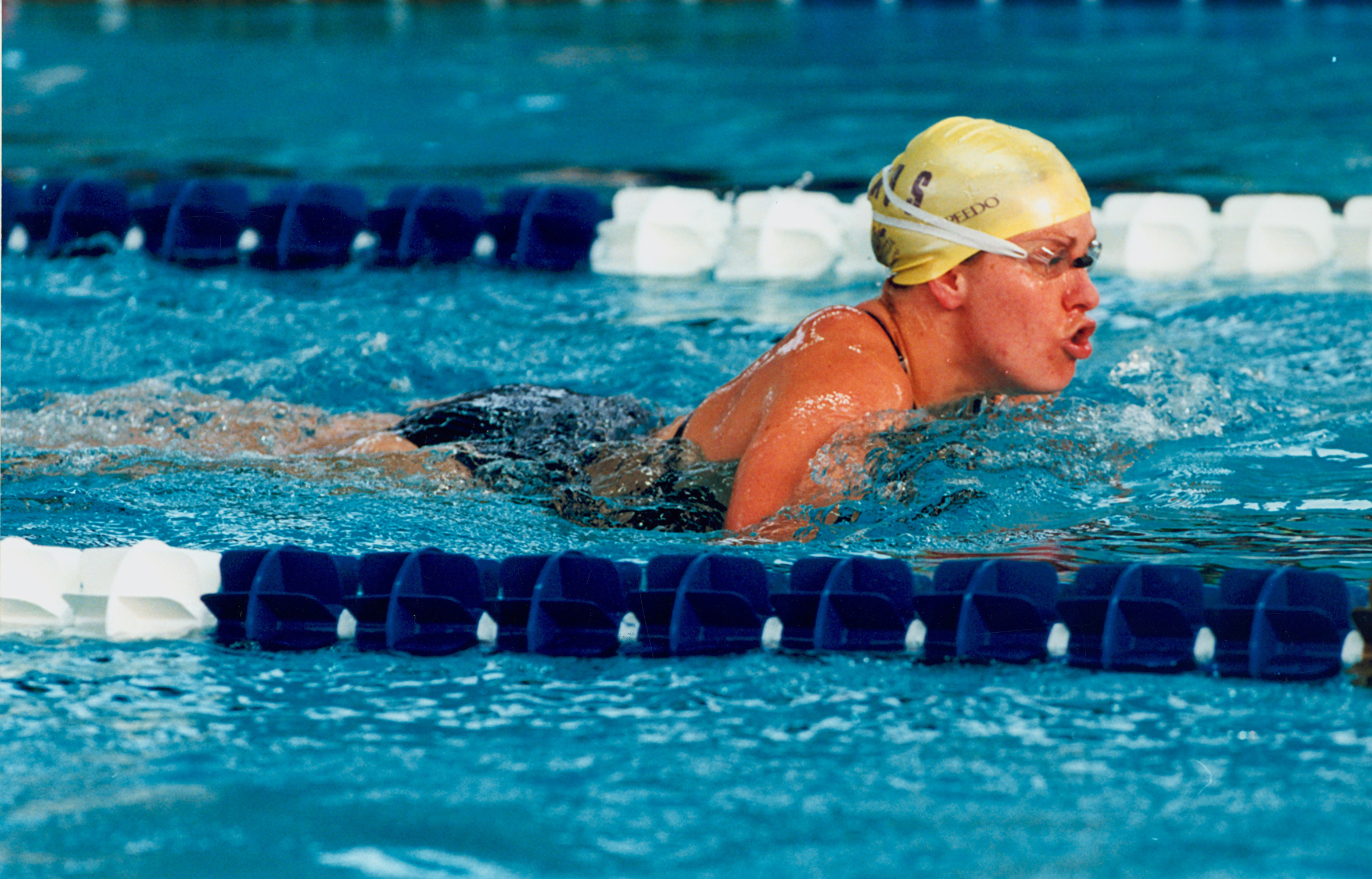
An unidentified Australian swimmer at the 1996 Atlanta Paralympic Games

Event	Gold	Silver	Bronze
50 m backstroke S2	Sara Carracelas; Spain	Mairead Berry; Ireland	Betiana Basualdo; Argentina
50 m backstroke S3	Aranzazu Gonzalez; Spain	Susana Barroso; Portugal	Annke Conradi; Germany
50 m backstroke S4	Kay Espenhayn; Germany	Mayumi Narita; Japan	Karen Breumsoe; Denmark
50 m backstroke S5	Béatrice Hess; France	Corinne D'Urzo; France	Jane Stidever; Great Britain
50 m breaststroke SB3	Noriko Kajiwara; Japan	Margaret McEleny; Great Britain	Kay Espenhayn; Germany
50 m butterfly S5	Béatrice Hess; France	Mónika Járomi; Hungary	Katalin Engelhardt; Hungary
50 m butterfly S6	Maria Goetze; Germany	Beate Schretzmann; Germany	Elizabeth Wright; Australia
50 m butterfly S7	Eva Nesheim; Norway	Margita Prokeinová; Slovakia	Malgorzata Okupniak; Poland
50 m freestyle B1	Eila Nilsson; Sweden	Tracey Cross; Australia	Janice Burton; Great Britain
50 m freestyle B2	Marge Kõrkjas; Estonia	Trischa Zorn; United States	Maria Angeles Fernandez; Spain
50 m freestyle B3	Yvonne Hopf; Germany	Daniela Henke; Germany	Marie Claire Ross; Canada
50 m freestyle MH	Tracy Wiscombe; Great Britain	Eela Kokk; Estonia	Sigrun Hrafnsdottir; Iceland
50 m freestyle S2	Sara Carracelas; Spain	Betiana Basualdo; Argentina	Victoria Broadribb; Great Britain
50 m freestyle S3	Aranzazu Gonzalez; Spain	Susana Barroso; Portugal	Annke Conradi; Germany
50 m freestyle S4	Mayumi Narita; Japan	Kay Espenhayn; Germany	Karen Breumsoe; Denmark
50 m freestyle S5	Béatrice Hess; France	Olena Akopyan; Ukraine	Margaret McEleny; Great Britain
50 m freestyle S6	Ludivine Loiseau; France	Jeanette Esling; Great Britain	Karni Liddell; Australia
50 m freestyle S7	Daniela Pohl; Germany	Tracey Oliver; Australia	Margita Prokeinová; Slovakia
50 m freestyle S8	Pernille Thomsen; Denmark	Priya Cooper; Australia	Brenda Levy; United States
50 m freestyle S9	Joyce Luncher; United States	Sabrina Bellavia; Belgium	Ricka Stenger; Denmark
50 m freestyle S10	Claudia Hengst; Germany	Judith Young; Australia	Elizabeth Prinsloo; South Africa
100 m backstroke B1	Raquel Saavedra; Spain	Eeva Riitta Fingerroos; Finland	Qiming Dong; China
100 m backstroke B2	Trischa Zorn; United States	Marge Kõrkjas; Estonia	Ana Garcia-Arcicollar; Spain
100 m backstroke B3	Yvonne Hopf; Germany	Marie Claire Ross; Canada	Elizabeth Scott; United States
100 m backstroke S10	Sarah Bailey; Great Britain	Karen Norris; United States	Judith Young; Australia
100 m backstroke S6	Jenny Newstead; New Zealand	Polina Dzhurova; Bulgaria	Xiangrong Zhou; China
100 m backstroke S7	Kristin Hakonardottir; Iceland	Eva Nesheim; Norway	Elisabeth Walker; Canada
100 m backstroke S8	Priya Cooper; Australia	Silvia Vives; Spain	Janelle Falzon; Australia
100 m backstroke S9	Jacqueline Nannenberg; Netherlands	Katarzyna Michalczyk; Poland	Melissa Carlton; Australia
100 m breaststroke B2	Carine van Puyvelde; Belgium	Elaine Barrett; Great Britain	Trischa Zorn; United States
100 m breaststroke B3	Marie Claire Ross; Canada	Daniela Henke; Germany	Elizabeth Scott; United States
100 m breaststroke SB4	Jenny Newstead; New Zealand	Sara Olofsson; Sweden	Maria Vikgren; Sweden
100 m breaststroke SB5	Camille Waddell; United States	Eva Nesheim; Norway	Gitta Ráczkó; Hungary
100 m breaststroke SB6	Malgorzata Okupniak; Poland	Edyta Okoczuk; Poland	Gerda Lampers; Netherlands
100 m breaststroke SB7	Kristin Hakonardottir; Iceland	Beate Schretzmann; Germany	Petra Reuvekamp; Netherlands
100 m breaststroke SB8	Tieyin Shi; China	Laura Tramuns Tripiana; Spain	Syreeta van Amelsvoort; Netherlands
100 m breaststroke SB9	Kateřina Coufalová; Czech Republic	Joyce Luncher; United States	Begona Reina; Spain
100 m breaststroke SB10	Sarah Bailey; Great Britain	Judith Young; Australia	Ricka Stenger; Denmark
100 m butterfly B1	Tracey Cross; Australia	Eeva Riitta Fingerroos; Finland	Janice Burton; Great Britain
100 m butterfly B3	Elizabeth Scott; United States	Daniela Henke; Germany	Marie Claire Ross; Canada
100 m butterfly S8	Syreeta van Amelsvoort; Netherlands	Silvia Vives; Spain	Priya Cooper; Australia
100 m butterfly S9	Joyce Luncher; United States	Melissa Carlton; Australia	Marina Tozzini; Italy
100 m butterfly S10	Gemma Dashwood; Australia	Judith Young; Australia	Ana Bernardo; Spain
100 m freestyle B1	Eila Nilsson; Sweden	Daniela Roehle; Germany	Eeva Riitta Fingerroos; Finland
100 m freestyle B2	Marge Kõrkjas; Estonia	Maria Angeles Fernandez; Spain	Trischa Zorn; United States
100 m freestyle B3	Yvonne Hopf; Germany	Daniela Henke; Germany	Marie Claire Ross; Canada
100 m freestyle MH	Tracy Wiscombe; Great Britain	Carla Sullivan; Australia	Petrea Barker; Australia
100 m freestyle S2	Betiana Basualdo; Argentina	Alejandra Perezlindo; Argentina	Sara Carracelas; Spain
100 m freestyle S3	Aranzazu Gonzalez; Spain	Annke Conradi; Germany	Susana Barroso; Portugal
100 m freestyle S4	Mayumi Narita; Japan	Kay Espenhayn; Germany	Aimee Bruder; United States
100 m freestyle S5	Béatrice Hess; France	Olena Akopyan; Ukraine	Margaret McEleny; Great Britain
100 m freestyle S6	Jeanette Esling; Great Britain	Ludivine Loiseau; France	Jenny Newstead; New Zealand
100 m freestyle S7	Daniela Pohl; Germany	Mireia Riera; Spain	Kristin Hakonardottir; Iceland
100 m freestyle S8	Priya Cooper; Australia	Pernille Thomsen; Denmark	Petra Reuvekamp; Netherlands
100 m freestyle S9	Joyce Luncher; United States	Melissa Carlton; Australia	Sabrina Bellavia; Belgium
100 m freestyle S10	Claudia Hengst; Germany	Gemma Dashwood; Australia	Sarah Bailey; Great Britain
150 m medley SM4	Kay Espenhayn; Germany	Margaret McEleny; Great Britain	Mayumi Narita; Japan
200 m breaststroke B2	Carine van Puyvelde; Belgium	Elaine Barrett; Great Britain	Ana Garcia-Arcicollar; Spain
200 m freestyle S4	Kay Espenhayn; Germany	Mayumi Narita; Japan	Aimee Bruder; United States
200 m freestyle S5	Béatrice Hess; France	Olena Akopyan; Ukraine	Margaret McEleny; Great Britain
200 m freestyle S6	Jenny Newstead; New Zealand	Ludivine Loiseau; France	Jeanette Esling; Great Britain
200 m medley B1	Tracey Cross; Australia	Daniela Roehle; Germany	Eeva Riitta Fingerroos; Finland
200 m medley B2	Trischa Zorn; United States	Maria Angeles Fernandez; Spain	Birgit Beeker; Germany
200 m medley B3	Marie Claire Ross; Canada	Yvonne Hopf; Germany	Elizabeth Scott; United States
200 m medley SM5	Béatrice Hess; France	Jenny Newstead; New Zealand	Katalin Engelhardt; Hungary
200 m medley SM6	Eva Nesheim; Norway	Maria Götze; Germany	Ludivine Loiseau; France
200 m medley SM7	Kristin Hakonardottir; Iceland	Malgorzata Okupniak; Poland	Hadda Guerchouche; France
200 m medley SM8	Priya Cooper; Australia	Syreeta van Amelsvoort; Netherlands	Silvia Vives; Spain
200 m medley SM9	Emily Jennings; Great Britain	Joyce Luncher; United States	Ricka Stenger; Denmark
200 m medley SM10	Sarah Bailey; Great Britain	Gemma Dashwood; Australia	Claudia Hengst; Germany
400 m freestyle B2	Melanie Easter; Great Britain	Trischa Zorn; United States	Maria Angeles Fernandez; Spain
400 m freestyle S7	Rebeccah Bornemann; Canada	Julie Wolfe; United States	Mireia Riera; Spain
400 m freestyle S8	Priya Cooper; Australia	Petra Reuvekamp; Netherlands	Janelle Falzon; Australia
400 m freestyle S9	Melissa Carlton; Australia	Marina Tozzini; Italy	Sabrina Bellavia; Belgium
400 m freestyle S10	Gemma Dashwood; Australia	Sarah Bailey; Great Britain	Claudia Hengst; Germany
4×50 m freestyle S1–6	Great Britain (GBR); Jane Stidever; Margaret McEleny; Jeanette Esling; Jennifer Booth	France (FRA); Béatrice Hess; Ludivine Loiseau; Virginie Tripier; Corinne D'Urzo	United States (USA); Camille Waddell; Sandra Hanebrink; Aimee Bruder; Stephanie Brooks
4×50 m medley S1–6	Hungary (HUN); Diána Zámbó; Gitta Ráczkó; Mónika Járomi; Katalin Engelhardt	United States (USA); Stephanie Brooks; Jill Nelson; Camille Waddell; Susan Moucha	Great Britain (GBR); Jennifer Booth; Jeanette Esling; Margaret McEleny; Jane Stidever
4 × 100 m freestyle B1–3	Germany (GER); Daniela Roehle; Birgit Beeker; Daniela Henke; Yvonne Hopf	Great Britain (GBR); Melanie Easter; Leanne Edmans; Janice Burton; Kirsty Stoneham	United States (USA); Elizabeth Scott; Dawn Duffy; Mandy Sommer; Trischa Zorn
4 × 100 m freestyle S7–10	Australia (AUS); Melissa Carlton; Priya Cooper; Janelle Falzon; Gemma Dashwood	United States (USA); Joyce Luncher; Allison Pittman; Karen Norris; Brenda Levy	Germany (GER); Beate Lobenstein; Daniela Pohl; Stephanie Puetz; Claudia Hengst
4 × 100 m medley B1–3	Germany (GER); Daniela Roehle; Birgit Beeker; Yvonne Hopf; Daniela Henke	United States (USA); Mandy Sommer; Elizabeth Scott; Katie Edgar; Trischa Zorn	Spain (ESP); Maria Angeles Fernandez; Anais Garcia; Ana Garcia-Arcicollar; Raquel Saavedra
4 × 100 m medley S7–10	United States (USA); Karen Norris; Diane Straub; Joyce Luncher; Allison Pittman	Germany (GER); Daniela Pohl; Claudia Hengst; Anna Brinck; Beate Lobenstein	Spain (ESP); Silvia Vives; Begona Reina; Ana Bernardo; Tania Cerda

== See also ==
- Swimming at the 1996 Summer Olympics
