= Russia at the 1996 Summer Paralympics =

- IPC code: RUS
- NPC: Russian Paralympic Committee
- Website: www.paralymp.ru (in Russian)

in Atlanta
- Competitors: 70 (60 men and 10 women)
- Medals Ranked 16th: Gold 9 Silver 7 Bronze 11 Total 27

Summer Paralympics appearances (overview)
- 1996; 2000; 2004; 2008; 2012; 2016–2024

Other related appearances
- Soviet Union (1988); Unified Team (1992); RPC (2020)

70 athletes (60 men and 10 women) from Russia competed at the 1996 Summer Paralympics in Atlanta, United States.

== Medallists ==
Medal	Name	Sport	Event
Gold	Sergeui Khodakov	Athletics	Men's discus F11
Gold	Sergey Sevostianov	Athletics	Men's pentathlon P10
Gold	Rima Batalova	Athletics	Women's 400m T11
Gold	Rima Batalova	Athletics	Women's 800m T10-11
Gold	Rima Batalova	Athletics	Women's 1500m T10-11
Gold	Rima Batalova	Athletics	Women's 3000m T10-11
Gold	Andrey Lebedinsky	Shooting	Men's air pistol SH1
Gold	Andrey Lebedinsky	Shooting	Mixed sport pistol SH1
Gold	Albert Bakaev	Swimming	Men's 50m backstroke S3
Silver	Sergey Sevostianov	Athletics	Men's long jump F10
Silver	Tatiana Mezinova	Athletics	Women's javelin F42-44/46
Silver	Olga Tchourkina	Athletics	Women's pentathlon P10-12
Silver	Victor Morozov; Sergui Nikachine; Alexei Chemanine; Marat Fatiakhdinov; G.Guerassimov; Pavel Sizov; Sergey Khryashev; Nikolai Korenkov; Andrey Lozhechnikov; Alexei Silatchev	Football 7-a-side	Men's team
Silver	Akhmed Gazemagomedov	Judo	Men's 65 kg
Silver	Albert Bakaev	Swimming	Men's 50m freestyle S3
Silver	Aleksei Kapoura	Swimming	Men's 100m butterfly S9
Bronze	Ildar Pomykalov	Athletics	Men's 5000m T12
Bronze	Serguei Khodakov	Athletics	Men's shot put F11
Bronze	Elena Jdanova	Athletics	Women's 400m T11
Bronze	Natalia Kletskova	Athletics	Women's javelin F42-44/46
Bronze	Veniamin Mitchourine	Judo	Men's 60 kg
Bronze	Andret Lebedinsky	Shooting	Mixed free pistol .22 SH1
Bronze	Vitali Krylov	Swimming	Men's 100m breaststroke B2
Bronze	Sergey Bestuchev	Swimming	Men's 100m breaststroke SB9
Bronze	Vladimir Tchesnov	Swimming	Men's 100m freestyle B3
Bronze	Vitali Krylov	Swimming	Men's 200m breaststroke B2
Bronze	Andrei Nefedov	Swimming	Men's 200m breaststroke B3

== See also ==
- Russia at the Paralympics
- Russia at the 1996 Summer Olympics
