= Swimming at the 2000 Summer Paralympics – Men's 200 metre individual medley SM9 =

Men's 200m individual medley SM9 at the XI Paralympic Games
- Paralympic Swimming
- Venue: Sydney International Aquatics Centre
- Dates: 20 October 2000

Medalists
1st place, gold medalist(s)		James Crisp	Great Britain
2nd place, silver medalist(s)		Jaime Serrano	Spain
3rd place, bronze medalist(s)		Jesus Collado	Spain

The men's 200m individual medley SM9 event took place on 20 October 2000 in Sydney, Australia.

== Results ==
=== Heat 1 ===
Rank	Athlete	Time	Notes
1	Xiong Xiaoming (CHN)	2:32.75	Q
2	Jesus Collado (ESP)	2:33.10	Q
3	Enrique Tornero (ESP)	2:34.80	Q
4	Rutger Sturkenboom (NED)	2:35.76	Q
5	Dana Albrycht (USA)	2:35.94	Q
6	Sebastien Berel (FRA)	2:45.32	
7	Manasa Marisiale (FIJ)	2:53.74	

=== Heat 2 ===
Rank	Athlete	Time	Notes
1	James Crisp (GBR)	2:31.21	Q
2	Andrew Haley (CAN)	2:31.85	Q
3	Jaime Serrano (ESP)	2:33.21	Q
4	Aleksei Kapoura (RUS)	2:37.03	
	David Rolfe (AUS)		DQ
	Detlef Schmidt (GER)		DQ
	Brad Sales (CAN)		DQ

=== Final ===
Rank	Athlete	Time	Notes
1st place, gold medalist(s)	James Crisp (GBR)	2:25.33	WR
2nd place, silver medalist(s)	Jaime Serrano (ESP)	2:29.19	
3rd place, bronze medalist(s)	Jesus Collado (ESP)	2:29.21	
4	Andrew Haley (CAN)	2:31.03	
5	Enrique Tornero (ESP)	2:33.05	
6	Rutger Sturkenboom (NED)	2:36.38	
	Xiong Xiaoming (CHN)		DQ
	Dana Albrycht (USA)		DQ
