= New Zealand at the 1996 Summer Paralympics =

- IPC code: NZL
- NPC: Paralympics New Zealand
- Website: paralympics.org.nz

in Atlanta
- Competitors: 30 in 7 sports
- Flag bearer: Ben Lucas
- Medals Ranked 19th: Gold 9 Silver 6 Bronze 3 Total 18

Summer Paralympics appearances (overview)
- 1968; 1972; 1976; 1980; 1984; 1988; 1992; 1996; 2000; 2004; 2008; 2012; 2016; 2020; 2024

New Zealand sent a delegation to compete at the 1996 Summer Paralympics in Atlanta.

== Medallists ==
Medal	Name	Sport	Event
Gold	Peter Martin	Athletics	Men's shot put F52
Gold	Cristeen Smith	Athletics	Women's 200m T51
Gold	Duane Kale	Swimming	Men's 50m butterfly S6
Gold	Duane Kale	Swimming	Men's 100m freestyle S6
Gold	Duane Kale	Swimming	Men's 200m freestyle S6
Gold	Duane Kale	Swimming	Men's 200m medley SM6
Gold	Jenny Newstead	Swimming	Women's 100m backstroke S6
Gold	Jenny Newstead	Swimming	Women's 100m breaststroke SB4
Gold	Jenny Newstead	Swimming	Women's 200m freestyle S6
Silver	David MacCalman	Athletics	Men's javelin F51
Silver	Peter Martin	Athletics	Men's javelin F52
Silver	Cristeen Smith	Athletics	Women's 800m T51
Silver	Duane Kale	Swimming	Men's 50m freestyle S6
Silver	Aaron Bidois	Swimming	Men's 100m breaststroke SB6
Silver	Jenny Newstead	Swimming	Women's 200m medley SM5
Bronze	Duane Kale	Swimming	Men's 100m backstroke S6
Bronze	Jenny Newstead	Swimming	Women's 100m freestyle S6

== See also ==
- 1996 Summer Paralympics
- New Zealand at the Paralympics
- New Zealand at the 1996 Summer Olympics
