= Nefyodov =

Nefyodov Nefedov (Russian: Нефёдов) (feminine: Nefuodova/Nefedova) is a Russian patronymic surname derived from the given name Нефёд, a layman form of the name Мефодий, Methodios. Notable people with the surname include:

- Andrei Nefedov, Russian paralympic swimmer
- Doris Nefedov or Alexandra (singer), German singer
- Elena Nefedova, Russian rhythmic gymnast
- Filipp Nefyodov (1838–1902), Russian writer, journalist, editor, ethnographer and archeologist
- Oleksandr Nefedov (born 1966), former Ukrainian football player
- Sergey Nefedov (born 1951), Russian historian
- Valentin Nefyodov (born 1982), Russian football player
