= Van Amelsvoort =

Van Amelsvoort is a Dutch surname. Notable people with the surname include:

- Marius van Amelsvoort (1930–2006), Dutch politician
- Syreeta van Amelsvoort (fl. 1996–2000), Dutch Paralympic swimmer
