= Swimming at the 2000 Summer Paralympics – Women's 150 metre individual medley SM4 =

Women's 150 metre individual medley SM4 at the XI Paralympic Games
- Paralympic Swimming
- Venue: Sydney International Aquatics Centre
- Dates: 20 October 2000

Medalists
1st place, gold medalist(s)		Mayumi Narita	Japan
2nd place, silver medalist(s)		Kay Espenhayn	Germany
3rd place, bronze medalist(s)		Margaret McEleny	Great Britain

The women's 150m individual medley event took place on 20 October 2000 in Sydney.

== Results ==
=== Heat 1 ===
Rank	Athlete	Time	Notes
1	Mayumi Narita (JPN)	2:57.31	Q
2	Melissa Willson (AUS)	3:20.55	Q
3	Anne Cecile Lequien (FRA)	3:31.45	Q
4	Natalia Popova (RUS)	3:44.41	Q
5	Regina Cachan (ESP)	4:01.42	
6	Cheryl Angelelli (USA)	4:02.01	

=== Heat 2 ===
Rank	Athlete	Time	Notes
1	Kay Espenhayn (GER)	3:06.56	Q
2	Margaret McEleny (GBR)	3:07.46	Q
3	Marayke Jonkers (AUS)	3:27.74	Q
4	Karen Breumsø (DEN)	3:41.91	Q
5	Aimee Bruder (USA)	3:45.03	
6	Rildene Fonseca (BRA)	4:04.70	

=== Final ===
Rank	Athlete	Time	Notes
1st place, gold medalist(s)	Mayumi Narita (JPN)	2:53.73	
2nd place, silver medalist(s)	Kay Espenhayn (GER)	3:04.02	
3rd place, bronze medalist(s)	Margaret McEleny (GBR)	3:06.00	
4	Melissa Willson (AUS)	3:18.31	
5	Anne Cecile Lequien (FRA)	3:24.64	
6	Marayke Jonkers (AUS)	3:35.78	
7	Karen Breumsø (DEN)	3:36.80	
8	Natalia Popova (RUS)	3:38.70	
