= Swimming at the 2000 Summer Paralympics – Women's 200 metre individual medley SM7 =

Women's 200m individual medley SM7 at the XI Paralympic Games
- Paralympic Swimming
- Venue: Sydney International Aquatics Centre
- Dates: 20 October 2000

Medalists
1st place, gold medalist(s)		Elisabeth Walker	Canada
2nd place, silver medalist(s)		Margita Prokeinova	Slovakia
3rd place, bronze medalist(s)		Kristin Hakonardottir	Iceland

The women's 200m individual medley SM7 event took place on 20 October 2000 in Sydney, Australia.

== Results ==
=== Heat 1 ===
Rank	Athlete	Time	Notes
1	Elisabeth Walker (CAN)	3:15.45	
2	Margita Prokeinova (SVK)	3:25.18	
3	Amanda Fraser (AUS)	3:34.94	
4	Montserrat Canals (ESP)	3:41.87	
5	Velia Flores (MEX)	3:47.23	
6	Stacey Williams (AUS)	3:56.29	

=== Heat 2 ===
Rank	Athlete	Time	Notes
1	Kristin Hakonardottir (ISL)	3:19.43	
2	Malgorzata Okupniak (POL)	3:27.40	
3	Eva Renate Indrevoll (NOR)	3:28.28	
4	Hilde Saeves (NOR)	3:38.63	
5	Caroline Read (GBR)	3:49.53	
	Tara Carkner (CAN)		DQ
	Gitta Raczko (HUN)		DQ

=== Final ===
Rank	Athlete	Time	Notes
1st place, gold medalist(s)	Elisabeth Walker (CAN)	3:14.36	WR
2nd place, silver medalist(s)	Margita Prokeinova (SVK)	3:19.00	
3rd place, bronze medalist(s)	Kristin Hakonardottir (ISL)	3:20.28	
4	Eva Renate Indrevoll (NOR)	3:26.33	
5	Malgorzata Okupniak (POL)	3:29.23	
6	Amanda Fraser (AUS)	3:34.44	
7	Hilde Saeves (NOR)	3:36.33	
8	Montserrat Canals (MEX)	3:38.62	
