= Martorell (surname) =

Martorell (Eastern Catalan: [məɾtuˈɾeʎ]) is a Catalan surname. Notable people with the name include:

- Antonio Martorell (born 1939), Puerto Rican painter, graphic artist, writer and radio and television personality
- Antonio Martorell Sastre (born 1978), Spanish Paralympic swimmer
- Bernat Martorell (died 1452), Catalan painter
- Chanchanit Martorell, Thai activist, educator, urban planner, and community development practitioner
- Federico Martorell (born 1981), Argentine football centre back
- Joan Martorell (1833–1906), Catalan architect and designer
- Joanot Martorell (1413–1465), Valencian knight and author
- María Martorell (born 1942), Spanish politician
- Miguel Martorell (born 1937), Spanish cyclist
- Oriol Martorell i Codina (1927–1996), Spanish musical director, pedagogue and professor of history
- Reynaldo Martorell, American nutritionist and professor
