= Martorell (disambiguation) =

Martorell is a town near Barcelona, Catalonia, Spain.

Martorell may also refer to:

- Martorell (surname)
- FS Martorell, futsal club based in Martorell, Spain
- Martorell's ulcer, a painful ulceration of the lower leg associated with diastolic arterial hypertension
