= Petra Reuvekamp =

Dutch Paralympic swimmer

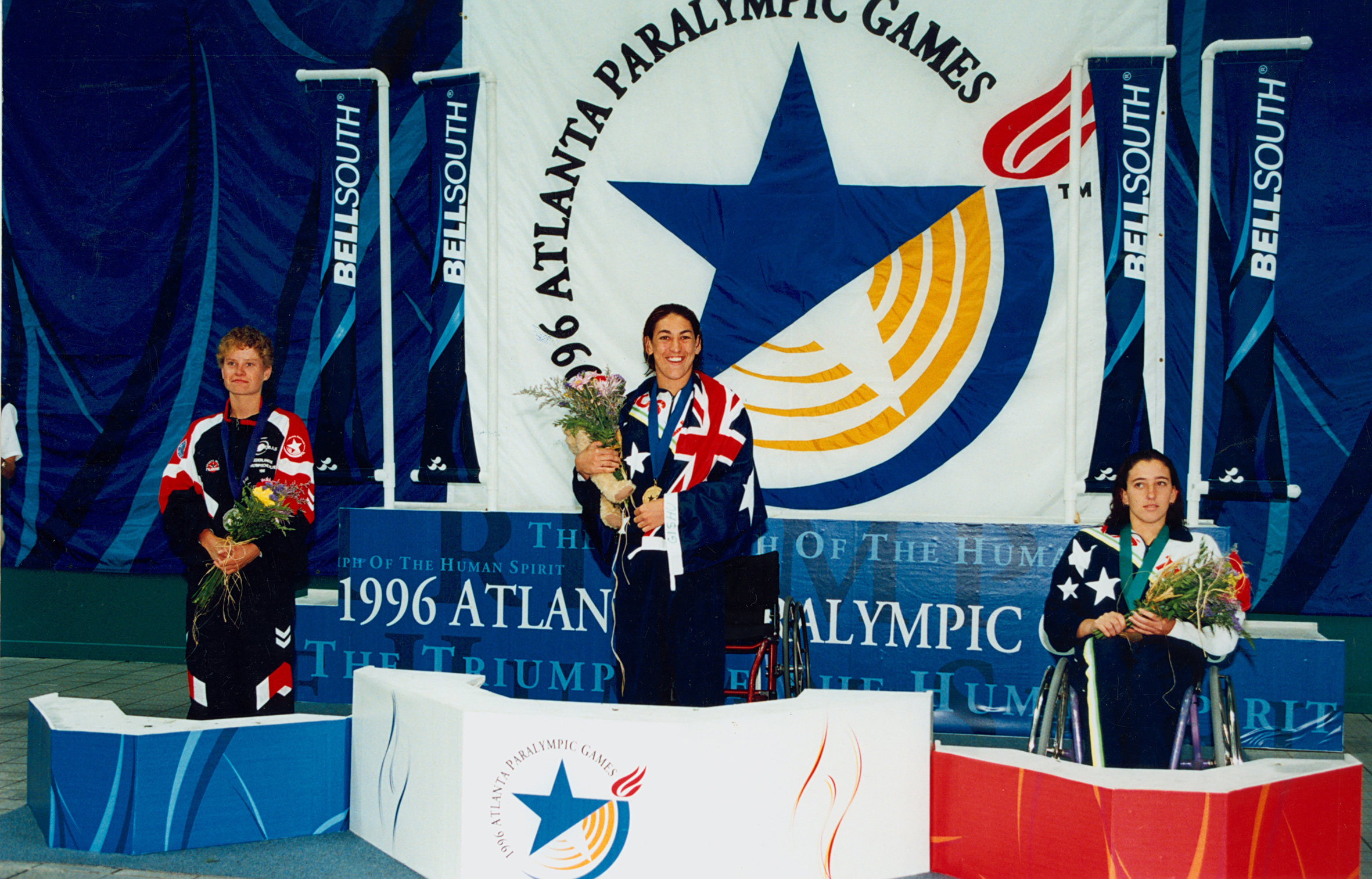
- Petra Reuvekamp (left), Priya Cooper (center), Janelle Falzon (right) (1996)

Sport
- Country: Netherlands
- Sport: Paralympic swimming
- Disability class: S8
Medal record
Paralympic swimming
Representing Netherlands
Paralympic Games
Silver medal – second place	1996 Atlanta	400m freestyle S8
Bronze medal – third place	1996 Atlanta	100m freestyle S8
Bronze medal – third place	1996 Atlanta	100m breaststroke SB7
World Championships
Bronze medal – third place	1998 Christchurch	100m breaststroke SB7

Petra Reuvekamp is a Dutch Paralympic swimmer. She represented the Netherlands at the 1996 Summer Paralympics held in Atlanta, Georgia, United States where she won one silver medal and two bronze medals.

She won the silver medal in the women's 400 m freestyle S8 event and the bronze medals in the women's 100 m freestyle S8 and women's 100 m breaststroke SB7 events.
