= Ben Lucas (wheelchair racer) =

New Zealand sports administrator and retired wheelchair racer

Personal information
- Full name: Benjamin Robert Lucas
- Born: 1965 (age 60–61)
- Years active: 1990–2000
- Employer: Accident Compensation Corporation
- Relative: Conrad Robertson (brother-in-law)

Sport
- Country: New Zealand
- Sport: Wheelchair racing
- Disability: paralysed
Medal record
Men's wheelchair racing
Representing New Zealand
World Wheelchair Games
Gold medal – first place	1999 Christchurch	wheelchair marathon

Benjamin Robert Lucas (born 1965) is a New Zealand sports administrator and retired wheelchair racer. He has represented his country at the 1994 Commonwealth Games, and the 1996 and 2000 Summer Paralympics. He was chef de mission for the New Zealand 2016 Summer Paralympics team.

== Wheelchair racing ==
Lucas grew up in Blenheim, New Zealand. He was very active as a teenager and pursued many outdoor activities. In 1989 aged 24, he crashed his motorbike into a u-turning van and broke his L3 lumbar vertebrae which left him paralysed. At the time, he had been studying towards a New Zealand Certificate in Science. His first wheelchair race was the 1990 Blenheim-Woodbourne half-marathon. In 1991, he competed at a race in Japan. He represented New Zealand at the 1994 Commonwealth Games in 800 m and the wheelchair marathon and won a bronze medal in the latter event. He represented New Zealand at the Summer Paralympic Games in 1996 in Atlanta, and in 2000 in Sydney. At both Paralympic Games, he was the team captain and the flagbearer. In Atlanta, he reached the semi-finals in the 5,000 m and 10,000 m races, and came in place eight in the wheelchair marathon. At the 1999 World Wheelchair Games in Christchurch, he won a gold medal in wheelchair marathon. He retired from competitive racing after the 2000 Sydney Games.

== Sports administration ==
Lucas worked for Sports Marlborough where he organised the recreation programme for CCS (the Crippled Children Society). In 1997, he moved from Blenheim to Christchurch and took on a role with Parafed Canterbury prior to the 2000 Sydney Games. He became a trustee of the Halberg Disability Sport Foundation in 2001 and from 2008 to 2012, he was on the board of Paralympics New Zealand. For four years, Lucas was the chief executive of the New Zealand Spinal Trust. It was announced in September 2013 that Lucas would succeed Duane Kale as chef de mission for the 2016 Summer Paralympics.
