= Ziv Better =

Israeli swimmer

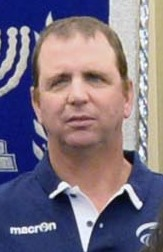

Personal information
- Native name: זיו בטר
- Born: 14 May 1965 (age 61) Lehavot HaBashan, Israel

Sport
- Sport: Para swimming
- Disability class: B2
Medal record
Event / 1st / 2nd / 3rd; Paralympic Games / 0 / 2 / 5
Men's para swimming
Representing Israel
Paralympic Games
Silver medal – second place	1992 Barcelona	100 m backstroke B2
Silver medal – second place	1992 Barcelona	400 m freestyle B2
Bronze medal – third place	1992 Barcelona	200 m backstroke B2
Bronze medal – third place	1992 Barcelona	400 m medley B1–2
Bronze medal – third place	1996 Atlanta	50 m freestyle B2
Bronze medal – third place	1996 Atlanta	100 m backstroke B2
Bronze medal – third place	1996 Atlanta	100 m freestyle B2

Ziv Better (Hebrew: זיו בטר) is a former Paralympic swimmer representing Israel at the Paralympics.

Better was born in Kibbutz Lehavot HaBashan. During his military service with the Israel Defense Forces (IDF) he served as an officer in Golani Brigade. Better was injured in 1987 by a mine while attempting to rescue one of his soldiers, Doron Shaziri, while fighting in the Lebanon War.

As a result of his injury he was blinded in his left eye and lost approximately 90% of his vision in his right eye. Shortly thereafter, he started swimming and soon reached a competitive level.

By 2004, Better had participated in eight European championships, four world championships and four Paralympic Games. At the 1992 Summer Paralympics in Barcelona, he won two silver medals and two bronze medals, and in the 1996 Summer Paralympics, he won three bronze medals. He has competed five Summer Paralympics from 1992 to 2008.

Better works as a Systems Analyst, and is married and a father of three.
