= Sergey Bestuchev =

Russian Paralympic swimmer

Medal record

Men's swimming

Representing Russia

Paralympic Games
Bronze medal – third place	1996 Atlanta	100 m breaststroke - SB9

Sergey Bestuchev (Russian: Сергей Бестучев) is a paralympic swimmer from Russia competing mainly in category SB9 events.

At the 1996 Summer Paralympics Sergey finished third in the 100m breaststroke behind Dutch pair Alwin de Groot and world record setter Jurjen Engelsman, he also swam in the 100m freestyle and 200m medley but failed to make the final in either event.
