= Gregory Burns =

American athlete and painter

- Born: 1957 (age 68–69); Washington, D.C., U.S.
- Known for: Painting
- Spouse: Angie Tan-Burns
- Website: gregoryburns.com

Medal record

Men's para swimming

Representing United States

Paralympic Games
Gold medal – first place	1996 Atlanta	4×50 m Freestyle S1–6
Gold medal – first place	1996 Atlanta	4×50 m Medley S1–6
Silver medal – second place	1992 Barcelona	100 m Breaststroke SB4
Silver medal – second place	1996 Atlanta	100 m Backstroke S6
Bronze medal – third place	1992 Barcelona	4×50 m Medley S1–6

Gregory Burns, MFA, PLY (born 1957) is an American athlete, painter, author, motivational speaker and member of Art of the Olympians.

As a competitive swimmer, Burns represented the USA in the 1992, 1996, and 2000 Paralympic Games, winning two gold, two silver and one bronze medal; he has set 5 World records and numerous American records. Retiring from the Paralympics, he transitioned to IronMan events, competing in the Korea and Singapore IronMan events. He has also trekked in the Himalayas, hiked the Grand Canyon, and summited Half Dome in Yosemite, Jade Mountain in Taiwan and Mount Kinabalu in Malaysia.

As a contemporary artist, his paintings have been exhibited in over 80 solo exhibitions and group exhibitions in 15 different countries. Burns has conducted over 40 Artist-in-Residence programs around the globe, one of which was featured on CNN. He is the recipient of the United States Sports Academy’s 2016 Sport Artist of the Year award, (painter). During the 2020 Tokyo Olympic and Paralympic Games, Gregory was one of six Olympic and Paralympic artists who were commissioned by the Olympic Foundation for Culture & Heritage to create artwork for the ‘Olympic Agora’ which was exhibited throughout Tokyo during the 2021 games, and showcased the connection between sports and art. Burns is also a member of the Olympic Education Commission.

As an author, Burns has published two books in English and one in Mandarin, and has written for numerous magazines.

== Biography ==
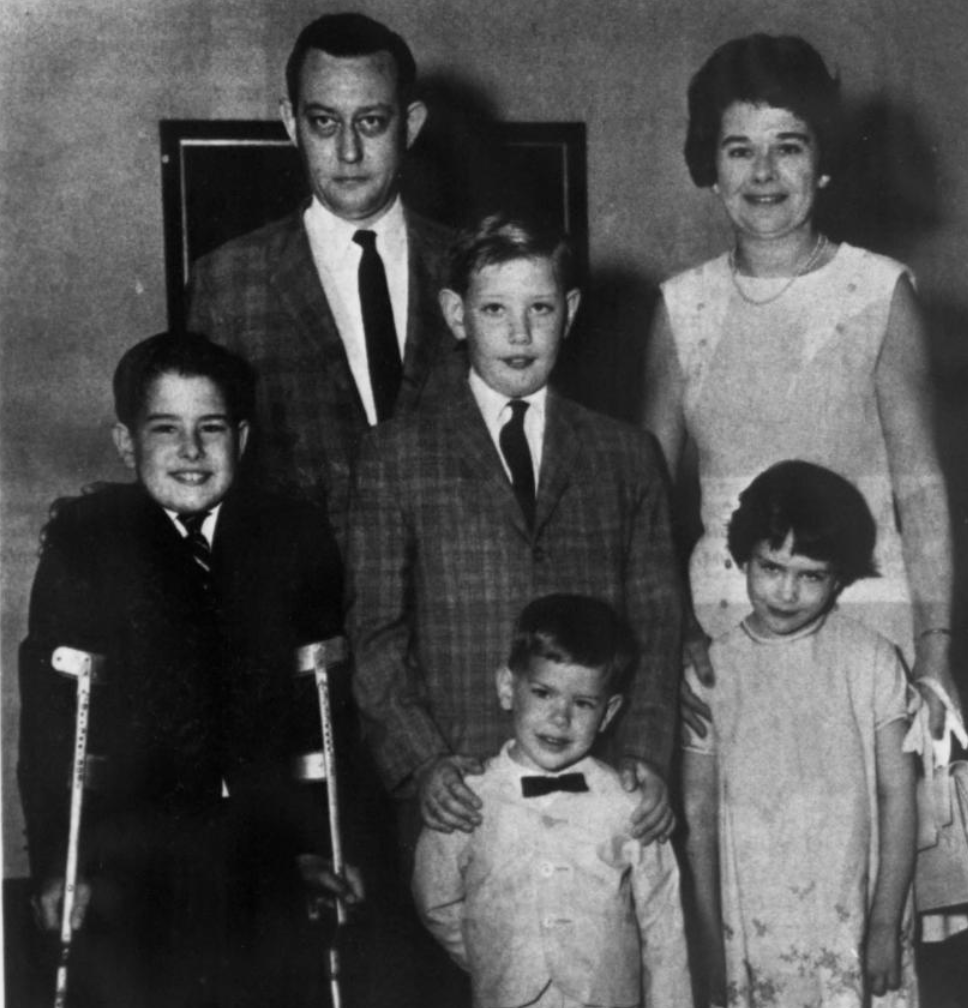
Gregory Burns as a boy, left, with his family, from a 1966 photo

Gregory Burns was born in Washington, D.C. in 1957. His father, Robert L. Burns, served in the diplomatic corps, and as a result he spent 10 years of his childhood abroad. He contracted polio in Jerusalem in 1958, which left him paralyzed from the waist down. At age three, he took to the water to learn to swim. At age six, he began painting lessons while living in Paris. His early schooling took place in France, Germany, Maryland, and the Netherlands. He earned a Bachelor of Arts in Communication Studies with a minor in Fine Art from the University of California, Santa Barbara (1976-1980), and a Master in Painting (MFA) in 1999 from the Royal Melbourne Institute of Technology, Australia.

As a competitive swimmer, Burns represented the USA in the 1992 (Barcelona), 1996 (Atlanta), and 2000 (Sydney) Paralympic Games, winning two gold medals, two silver medals, and one bronze medal. He set 5 world records in Paralympic swimming and numerous national records. Following his final Paralympic Games at Sydney in 2000, he transitioned into endurance sporting events; Burns completed the 2006 Korea IronMan race and the Singapore Half-IronMan races in 2007, 2010, 2011, and 2012. Burns is also an avid scuba diver, surfer, hiker, hand cyclist and sit-down snow skier.

As a contemporary artist, Burns has been described as an abstract impressionist. Burns conducted postgraduate studies at (1) Cabrillo College, near Santa Cruz, California, studying commercial and fine art (1982-1984), (2) Chung Da University/National Chengchi University, Taipei, Taiwan, studying Chinese painting & calligraphy and history (in Mandarin; 1984-1985), and (3) Royal Melbourne Institute of Technology, Melbourne, Australia, earning a Master of Fine Art in Painting (1998-1999). His paintings have been shown in 80 solo exhibitions plus dozens of group exhibitions in 15 countries. Burns has conducted 40 Artist-in-Residence programs around the globe. He is the recipient of the United States Sports Academy’s 2016 Sport Artist of the Year award (painter).

As an author, Burns has published three books: Painted Journey (2005) and The Art of Mindfulness (2014) in English, and Color Your Life (2008) in Mandarin.

== Medals ==
- 1992 IX Summer Paralympics, Barcelona
  - Men's 100 m Breaststroke SB4, Silver Medal
  - Men's 4×50 m Medley Relay S1–6, Bronze Medal
- 1996 X Summer Paralympics, Atlanta
  - Men's 100 m Backstroke S6, Silver Medal
  - Men's 4×50 m Freestyle Relay S1–6, Gold Medal
  - Men's 4×50 m Medley Relay S1–6, Gold Medal

== Records ==
- World Records in Swimming
  - 1981, Men's 50 m Backstroke, International Stoke Mandeville Games, England
  - 1992, Men's 100 m Breaststroke SB4 (Time in qualifying heat: 1:44.21), IX Summer Paralympics, Barcelona
  - 1996, Men's 100 m Backstroke S6 (Time: 1:20.65), X Summer Paralympics, Atlanta
  - 1996, Men's 4×50 m Freestyle Relay S1–6 (Team Time: 2:38.13), X Summer Paralympics, Atlanta
  - 1996, Men's 4×50 m Medley Relay S1–6 (Team Time: 2:39.28), X Summer Paralympics, Atlanta
- American Records in Swimming
  - 1977, 5 USA Records, USA Nationals
  - 1992, Men's 100 m Breaststroke SB4 (Time in qualifying heat: 1:44.21), IX Summer Paralympics, Barcelona
  - 1996, Men's 50 m Breaststroke SB4 (Time: 47.50), Indianapolis
  - 1996, Men's 200 m Individual Medley SM6 (Time: 3:19.68), X Summer Paralympics, Atlanta
  - 1996, Men's 100 m Backstroke S6 (Time: 1:20.65), X Summer Paralympics, Atlanta
  - 2000, Men's 200 m Backstroke S6 (Time: 2:55.07), Minneapolis
  - 2000, Men's 4x50 m Freestyle Relay 20 pts. Class (Team Time: 2:52.79), XI Summer Paralympics, Sydney

== Bibliography ==
- Painted Journey, Gregory Burns, Singapore, 2005. ISBN 9810521286
- Color Your Life (Mandarin), Gregory Burns, Taiwan, 2008.

== See also ==
- International Paralympic Committee
- Team USA Paralympics
- Paralympic Swimming
- USA Swimming
- IronMan Triathlon
- Half-IronMan
- United States at the 1992 Summer Paralympics
- United States at the 1996 Summer Paralympics
- United States at the 2000 Summer Paralympics
