= Tony Alexander (swimmer) =

Canadian Paralympic swimmer

Sport
- Sport: Swimming
Medal record
Men's paralympic swimming
Representing Canada
Summer Paralympics
Gold medal – first place	1996 Atlanta	50 m freestyle S7
Silver medal – second place	1996 Atlanta	100 m freestyle S7

Tony Alexander is a Canadian Paralympic swimmer. He represented Canada at the 1996 Summer Paralympics held in Atlanta, United States and he won the gold medal in the men's 50 metres freestyle S7 event. He also won the silver medal in the men's 100 metres freestyle S7 event.
