= Garth Harris (swimmer) =

Canadian Paralympic swimmer

Sport
- Sport: Swimming
Medal record
Men's paralympic swimming
Representing Canada
Summer Paralympics
Bronze medal – third place	1996 Atlanta	50 m breaststroke SB3

Garth Harris is a Canadian Paralympic swimmer. He represented Canada at the 1996 Summer Paralympics held in Atlanta, United States and he won the bronze medal in the men's 50 metres breaststroke SB3 event.
