= Netherlands at the 1996 Summer Paralympics =

- Flag of the Netherlands
- IPC code: NED
- NPC: Nederlands Olympisch Comité * Nederlandse Sport Federatie
- Website: paralympisch.nl (in Dutch)

in Atlanta
- Competitors: 108 (75 men and 33 women)
- Medals Ranked 8th: Gold 17 Silver 11 Bronze 17 Total 45

Summer Paralympics appearances (overview)
- 1960; 1964; 1968; 1972; 1976; 1980; 1984; 1988; 1992; 1996; 2000; 2004; 2008; 2012; 2016; 2020; 2024

Netherlands competed at the 1996 Summer Paralympics in Atlanta, Georgia, USA. The team included 108 athletes, 75 men and 33 women. Competitors from Netherlands won 45 medals, including 17 gold, 11 silver and 17 bronze to finish 8th in the medal table.

== Medalists ==
Medal	Name	Sport	Event
Gold	Willem Noorduin	Athletics	Men's Shot Put F35
Gold	Jan Mulder; Pascal Schoots	Cycling track	Men's Individual Pursuit Tandem open
Gold	Netherlands men's 7-a-side football team: Carlo Dengerink; Olaf Donners; Percy Enser; Rene Glimmerveen; Pater Guntlisbergen; Paul Heersink; Dirk Hennink; Olaf Karssen; Arno de Jong; Jaap de Vries; Rudi van Breemen	Football 7-a-side	Men
Gold	Alwin de Groot	Swimming	Men's 100 m Backstroke S10
Gold	Kasper Engel	Swimming	Men's 100 m Breaststroke SB5
Gold	Jurjen Engelsman	Swimming	Men's 100 m Breaststroke SB9
Gold	Alwin Houtsma	Swimming	Men's 100 m Freestyle MH
Gold	Alwin de Groot	Swimming	Men's 100 m Freestyle S10
Gold	Alwin de Groot	Swimming	Men's 200 m Medley SM10
Gold	Alwin de Groot	Swimming	Men's 400 m Freestyle S10
Gold	Alwin Houtsma	Swimming	Men's 50 m Freestyle MH
Gold	Alwin de Groot	Swimming	Men's 50 m Freestyle S10
Gold	Jacqueline Nannenberg	Swimming	Women's 100 m Backstroke S9
Gold	Syreeta van Amelsvoort	Swimming	Women's 100 m Butterfly S8
Gold	Ricky Molier	Wheelchair tennis	Men's Singles
Gold	Monique Kalkman-van den Bosch; Chantal Vandierendonck	Wheelchair tennis	Women's Doubles
Gold	Maaike Smit	Wheelchair tennis	Women's Singles
Silver	Jappie Walstra	Archery	Men's Individual W2
Silver	Alwin de Groot	Swimming	Men's 100 m Breaststroke SB9
Silver	Alwin de Groot	Swimming	Men's 100 m Butterfly S10
Silver	Rutger Sturkenboom	Swimming	Men's 100 m Freestyle S9
Silver	Jurjen Engelsman	Swimming	Men's 200 m Medley SM10
Silver	Rutger Sturkenboom	Swimming	Men's 200 m Medley SM9
Silver	Rutger Sturkenboom	Swimming	Men's 50 m Freestyle S9
Silver	Syreeta van Amelsvoort	Swimming	Women's 200 m Medley SM8
Silver	Petra Reuvekamp	Swimming	Women's 400 m Freestyle S8
Silver	Netherlands women's wheelchair basketball team: Erna Benneker; Yolanda Broerse; Jorien Buurman; Asjoesja Ibrahimi; Jennette Jansen; Jozima Mosely; Ingeborg Tiggelman; Jaapje de Zeeuw; Evelina van Leeuwen; Marja van Leeuwen; Jeanine van Veggel; Guda van der Laan	Wheelchair basketball	Women
Silver	Monique Kalkman-van den Bosch	Wheelchair tennis	Women's Singles
Bronze	Manfred Kooy	Athletics	Men's 800 m T37
Bronze	Willem Noorduin	Athletics	Men's Discus F35
Bronze	Joop Stokkel	Equestrian	Mixed Dressage grade III
Bronze	Jurgen Lentink	Swimming	Men's 100 m Backstroke B3
Bronze	Jurjen Engelsman	Swimming	Men's 100 m Backstroke S10
Bronze	Jurgen Lentink	Swimming	Men's 100 m Breaststroke B3
Bronze	Laurentius van Geel	Swimming	Men's 100 m Breaststroke SB7
Bronze	Jurjen Engelsman	Swimming	Men's 100 m Freestyle S10
Bronze	Kasper Engel; Jurjen Engelsman; Rutger Sturkenboom; Alwin de Groot; Laurentius van Geel	Swimming	Men's 4 × 100 m Medley S7-10
Bronze	Gerda Lampers	Swimming	Women's 100 m Breaststroke SB6
Bronze	Petra Reuvekamp	Swimming	Women's 100 m Breaststroke SB7
Bronze	Syreeta van Amelsvoort	Swimming	Women's 100 m Breaststroke SB8
Bronze	Petra Reuvekamp	Swimming	Women's 100 m Freestyle S8
Bronze	Harold Kersten	Table tennis	Men's Singles 6
Bronze	Gertrudis Laemers	Table tennis	Women's Singles 4
Bronze	Ricky Molier; Eric Stuurman	Wheelchair tennis	Men's Doubles
Bronze	Chantal Vandierendonck	Wheelchair tennis	Women's Singles

Source: www.paralympic.org & www.olympischstadion.nl

== See also ==
- Netherlands at the Paralympics
- Netherlands at the 1996 Summer Olympics
