= Marie Claire Ross =

Canadian paralympic swimmer (born 1975 or 1976)

Personal information
- National team: Canada
- Born: 1975 or 1976 (age 50–51) London, Ontario, Canada
- Education: Ryerson Polytechnic Institute

Sport
- Country: Canada
- Sport: Para-swimming
- Disability: Visual impairment
- Disability class: B3
Medal record
Women's Para-swimming
Event	1st	2nd	3rd
Paralympic Games	2	2	6
IPC World Championships	0	1	1
Total	2	3	7
Representing Canada
Paralympic Games
Gold medal – first place	1996 Atlanta	100 m breaststroke B3
Gold medal – first place	1996 Atlanta	200 m medley B3
Silver medal – second place	1992 Barcelona	Women's 100 m Breaststroke B3
Silver medal – second place	1996 Atlanta	Women's 100 m Backstroke B3
Bronze medal – third place	1992 Barcelona	Women's 50 m Freestyle B3
Bronze medal – third place	1992 Barcelona	Women's 4×100 m Freestyle B1-3
Bronze medal – third place	1992 Barcelona	Women's 4×100 m Medley B1-3
Bronze medal – third place	1996 Atlanta	Women's 50 m Freestyle B3
Bronze medal – third place	1996 Atlanta	Women's 100 m Butterfly B3
Bronze medal – third place	1996 Atlanta	Women's 100 m Freestyle B3
IPC World Swimming Championships
Silver medal – second place	1994 Valletta	Women's 200 m medley B3
Bronze medal – third place	1994 Valletta	Women's 100 m Butterfly B1-3

Marie Claire Ross (born 1975 or 1976) is a Canadian B3 classified para-swimmer who has a visual impairment and competed in the Paralympic Games and the IPC World Swimming Championships. She began swimming at the age of 14 and joined a swimming club in her home town of London, Ontario. Ross won four medals: one silver and three bronze medals in the 1992 Summer Paralympics in Barcelona. She earned six more medals with three bronze medals, two gold medals and one silver medal in the 1996 Summer Paralympics at Atlanta. Ross has also won a silver medal and a bronze medal at the 1994 IPC World Swimming Championships in Valletta.

== Early life and education ==
Ross was born in either 1975 and 1976, and comes from London, Ontario. Until she was eight, she had normal eyesight until a genetic disorder reduced it to less than ten percent peripheral vision in the space of two months and thus became legally blind. Ross has no central vision and cannot detect finer details or has a perception of depth. She matriculated to Ryerson Polytechnic Institute in Toronto and studied nutritional science.

== Career ==
Although she disliked sports due to negative experiences making her feel frightened by the activity, Ross took up swimming at age 14, and got enough money to become a member of a swimming club in London. She completed just two or three strokes to start with but improved it to 75 by the conclusion of the year. At the 1992 Summer Paralympics in Barcelona, Spain, Ross won the silver medal in the women's 100 metres breastroke B3 event and the bronze medal in the 4×100-metre freestyle relay B1–3 alongside Nancy Irvine, Carla Qualtrough and Yvette Weicker. She also won two further bronze medals in the Women's 4×100 metres Medley B1-3 with the same team and the Women's 50 metres Freestyle B3 events.

Ross finished third for the bronze medal in the women's 100 metres freestyle in the 1994 Canadian Youth Swimming Championships in Winnipeg. She later qualified to compete at the 1994 IPC World Swimming Championships in Valletta, Malta. Ross won the silver medal in the women's 200-metre medley B3 competition and the bronze medal in the women's 100 metres butterfly B3 event. The following year, she was a medallist in the women's 200 metres individual medley at the Superior Propane Cup in Lethbridge. Ross was subsequently named a recipient of the Petro-Canada Olympic Torch Scholarship program by the Canadian Olympic Association. At the 1996 Canada Youth Swimming Championships for Swimmers with a Disability in Nepean, Ontario, she set a new world disabled record in winning the women's 200 metres individual medley B3 event. Ross then won the women's 100 metres breaststroke the following day.

Following these results, she was nominated to be part of Canada's swimming team at the 1996 Summer Paralympics in Atlanta, United States. Ross established a new world disabled record to claim the gold medal in the women's 200 metres individual medley B3 event. She went on to claim a second gold medal with another new world disabled record in the women's 100 metres breaststroke B3 competition. Ross also claimed the silver medal in the women's 100 metres backstroke B3 event and the bronze in each of the women's 50 metres freestyle, the women's 100 metres butterfly and the women's 100 metres freestyle all in the B3 category. For her achievements, she was named a Swimmer of the Year for 1996 by Swimming Canada.

Ross took the gold medals in each of the women's 200 metres freestyle, the women's 100 metres breaststroke, the women's 100 metres butterfly, and the women's 200 metres individual medley at the 1997 National Youth Championships for Swimmers with a Disability in Regina, Saskatchewan. She placed first in the women's 100 metres butterfly B3 and the women's 50 metres freestyle events at the 1997 US National Championships for Swimmers with a Disability in Springfield, Massachusetts. At the 1998 Ontario Swimming Championships in Toronto, Ross finished third in the women's 100 metres butterfly and second in the women's 50 metres butterfly competitions.

She went on to finish fourth in the women's 50 metres freestyle, second in the women's 200 metres individual medley and first in the women's 100 metres butterfly events at the 1998 Canadian Swimming Championships for Swimmers with a Disability in Sherbrooke, Quebec. At the 1998 IBSA World Championships in Madrid, Spain, Ross won gold medals in each of the women's 100 metres butterfly and the women's 100 metres backstroke events. During the following year's Canadian National Championships for Swimmers with a Disability in Victoria, British Columbia, she placed second in the women's 100 metres breaststroke before going on to finish eighth in the women's 100 metres freestyle.
