= María Ángeles Fernández Lebrato =

Spanish cyclist

Personal information
- Nationality: Spain
- Born: 12 September 1970 (age 55) Valladolid

Sport
- Sport: Swimming
Medal record
Women's swimming
Representing Spain
Paralympic Games
Silver medal – second place	1996 Atlanta	100m freestyle B2
Silver medal – second place	1996 Atlanta	200m individual medley B2
Bronze medal – third place	1996 Atlanta	50m freestyle B2
Bronze medal – third place	1996 Atlanta	400m freestyle B2
Bronze medal – third place	1996 Atlanta	4x100m medley relay B1-3

María Angeles Fernandez Lebrato (born 12 September 1970 in Valladolid) is a vision impaired cyclist and B2/S12 swimmer from Spain. She competed at the 1996 Summer Paralympics in swimming, winning a silver medal in the 200 meter individual medley and the 100 meter freestyle, and a bronze medal in the 50 meter freestyle race, 400 meter freestyle race and the 4 x 100 medley Relay 49 Points race. She competed at the 2000 Summer Paralympics in cycling.
