= Francisco Segarra Simón =

Spanish swimmer

Francisco Segarra
Personal information
- Full name: Francisco Segarra Simón
- Nationality: Spanish
- Born: 27 February 1976 (age 50) Granollers, Barcelona, Spain

Sport
- Country: Spain
- Sport: Swimming (S12)
Medal record
Swimming
Representing Spain
Paralympic Games
Silver medal – second place	1996 Atlanta	400m freestyle B2
Silver medal – second place	1996 Atlanta	100m backstroke B2
Bronze medal – third place	2000 Sydney	100m backstroke S12
Bronze medal – third place	2000 Sydney	4x100m medley relay S11-13

Francisco Segarra Simón (born 27 February 1976 in Granollers, Barcelona) is a vision impaired S12 swimmer from Spain. He competed at the 1996 Summer Paralympics, winning a pair of silver medals in the 400 meter freestyle race and the 100 meter backstroke race. He raced at the 2000 Summer Paralympics, earning a pair of bronze medals in the 4 x 100 meter relay medley 49 points race and the 100 meter backstroke race.
