= Eila Nilsson =

Swedish swimmer (1966–2022)

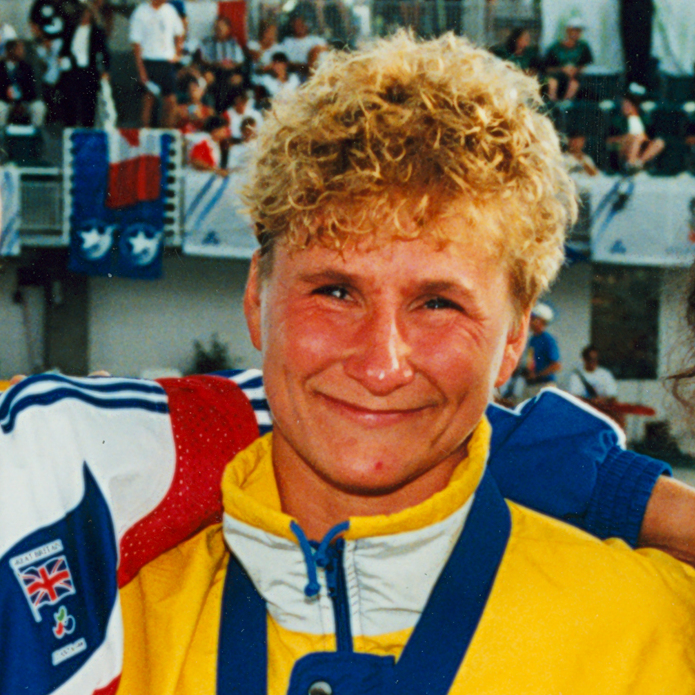
- Nilsson at 1996 Summer Paralympics

Personal information
- Born: 20 November 1966 Norsjö, Sweden
- Died: 19 September 2022 (aged 55) Skelleftehamn, Sweden

Sport
- Country: Sweden
- Sport: Paralympic swimming
- Disability class: B1
Medal record
Paralympic swimming
Representing Sweden
Paralympic Games
Gold medal – first place	1996 Atlanta	50m freestyle B1
Gold medal – first place	1996 Atlanta	100m freestyle B1

Eila Susanne Nilsson (20 November 1966 – 19 September 2022) was a Swedish swimmer, masseur, therapist in Chinese medicine and lecturer in mental counseling.

== Biography ==
Nilsson was born in Norsjö and was diagnosed with diabetes at the age of three. At the age of 21, in 1987, she suffered changes in her right eye. These were treated with lasers, but she became blind on her right eye. The left eye suffered from bleeding a few months later. After four specialist operations, the retina detached and she lost the sight in that eye as well. In 2017, Nilsson suffered from malignant breast cancer, which was followed by chemotherapy and radiation.

Nilsson died at the age of 55. Nilsson died in Skelleftehamn, Skellefteå kommun.

== Merits ==
As a swimmer, Nilsson became a double Paralympic champion in swimming for the blind, which she won at the Paralympic Games in Atlanta 1996. She also won two European Championship golds and several Swedish championships. As of 2022, she still held the world record in 50 meter freestyle for the blind at 33.02 seconds.
