= Marina Tozzini =

Italian Paralympic swimmer

Sport
- Sport: Swimming
Medal record
Women's paralympic swimming
Representing Italy
Summer Paralympics
| Silver medal – second place | 1996 Atlanta | 400 m freestyle S9 |
| Bronze medal – third place | 1996 Atlanta | 100 m butterfly S9 |

Marina Tozzini is an Italian Paralympic swimmer. She represented Italy at the 1996 Summer Paralympics held in Atlanta, United States and she won the silver medal in the women's 400 metres freestyle S9 event. She also won the bronze medal in the women's 100 metres butterfly S9 event.
