= Aranzazu González Muñoz =

Spanish Paralympic swimmer

Aranzazu González
Personal information
- Full name: Aranzazu González Muñoz
- Nationality: Spain
- Born: 5 June 1975 (age 51) San Sebastian, Guipúzcoa, Spain

Sport
- Sport: Swimming
Medal record
Women's swimming
Representing Spain
Paralympic Games
| Gold medal – first place | 1996 Atlanta | 50 m backstroke S3 |
| Gold medal – first place | 1996 Atlanta | 50 m freestyle S3 |
| Gold medal – first place | 1996 Atlanta | 100 m freestyle S3 |

Aranzazu González Muñoz (born 5 June 1975) is a S4 swimmer from Spain. She competed at the 1996 Summer Paralympics in Atlanta, Georgia, winning a gold medal in the 50 meter backstroke, 50 meter freestyle and 100 meter freestyle races.
