= Joyce Luncher =

American Paralympic swimmer

Personal information
- Born: 19 June 1975 (age 51) Pittsburgh, Pennsylvania
- Education: The Catholic University of America
- Height: 5 ft 2 in (157 cm)

Sport
- Country: United States
- Sport: Paralympic swimming
- Disability class: S9, SM9, SB9
- Club: Catholic University Cardinals
- Coached by: Tom Calomeris
Medal record
Paralympic swimming
Representing United States
Paralympic Games
Gold medal – first place	1996 Atlanta	Women's 50m freestyle S9
Gold medal – first place	1996 Atlanta	Women's 100m freestyle S9
Gold medal – first place	1996 Atlanta	Women's 100m butterfly S9
Gold medal – first place	1996 Atlanta	Women's 4x100m medley relay S7-10
Silver medal – second place	1996 Atlanta	Women's 100m breaststroke SB9
Silver medal – second place	1996 Atlanta	Women's 200m individual medley SM9
Silver medal – second place	1996 Atlanta	Women's 4x100m freestyle S7-10

Joyce Hale née Joyce Luncher (born 19 June 1975) is a retired American Paralympic swimmer who competed at the 1996 Summer Paralympics where she set seven American records and four world records. She was born without her right forearm.
