= Ukraine at the 1996 Summer Paralympics =

- IPC code: UKR
- NPC: National Sports Committee for the Disabled of Ukraine
- Website: www.paralympic.org.ua

in Atlanta
- Competitors: 30 (25 men and 5 women)
- Medals Ranked 44th: Gold 1 Silver 4 Bronze 2 Total 7

Summer Paralympics appearances (overview)
- 1996; 2000; 2004; 2008; 2012; 2016; 2020; 2024

Other related appearances
- Soviet Union (1988); Unified Team (1992)

Thirty athletes (25 men and 5 women) from Ukraine competed at the 1996 Summer Paralympics in Atlanta, United States.

== Medallists ==
Medal	Name	Sport	Event
Gold	Vasyl Lishchynskyi	Athletics	Men's shot put F11
Silver	Vasyl Lishchynskyi	Athletics	Men's discus F11
Silver	Olena Akopyan	Swimming	Women's 50m freestyle S5
Silver	Olena Akopyan	Swimming	Women's 100m freestyle S5
Silver	Olena Akopyan	Swimming	Women's 200m freestyle S5
Bronze	Igor Gorbenko	Athletics	Men's triple jump F11
Bronze	Yuriy Andryushin	Swimming	Men's 100m freestyle S7

== See also ==
- Ukraine at the Paralympics
- Ukraine at the 1996 Summer Olympics
