= Raquel Saavedra Salvador =

Spanish swimmer

Personal information
- Nationality: Spanish
- Born: May 11, 1981 (age 45) Barcelona

Sport
- Country: Spain
- Sport: Swimming (S11/B1)
Medal record
Swimming
Representing Spain
Paralympic Games
Gold medal – first place	1996 Atlanta	100m backstroke B1
Bronze medal – third place	1996 Atlanta	4x100m medley relay B1-3
Bronze medal – third place	2000 Sydney	100m backstroke S11

Raquel Saavedra Salvador (born May 11, 1981, in Barcelona) is a vision impaired S11/B1 swimmer from Spain. She competed at the 1996 Summer Paralympics, winning a gold medal in the 100 meter backstroke, and a bronze medal in the 4 x 100 meter 49 points medley relay race. She competed at the 2000 Summer Paralympics, earning a bronze in the 100 meter backstroke.
