= Jurgen Lentink =

Dutch Paralympic swimmer

Sport
- Sport: Swimming
Medal record
Men's paralympic swimming
Representing Netherlands
Summer Paralympics
| Bronze medal – third place | 1996 Atlanta | 100 m backstroke B3 |
| Bronze medal – third place | 1996 Atlanta | 100 m breaststroke B3 |

Jurgen Lentink is a Dutch Paralympic swimmer. He represented the Netherlands at the 1996 Summer Paralympics and at the 2000 Summer Paralympics. In 1996, he won the bronze medals in the men's 100 m backstroke B3 and men's 100 m breaststroke B3 events.
