= Camille Waddell =

American Paralympic swimmer

Sport
- Country: United States
- Sport: Paralympic swimming
- Disability: Dwarfism
- Disability class: S6
Medal record
Paralympic swimming
Representing United States
Paralympic Games
Gold medal – first place	1992 Barcelona	100m breaststroke SB5
Gold medal – first place	1996 Atlanta	100m breaststroke SB5
Silver medal – second place	1992 Barcelona	50m freestyle S6
Silver medal – second place	1996 Atlanta	4x50m medley relay S1-6
Bronze medal – third place	1996 Atlanta	4x50m freestyle relay S1-6

Camille Carol Waddell Black is a retired American Paralympic swimmer and former advertising executive. She competed at the 1992 Summer Paralympics in Barcelona where she set a new world record in the 100-meter breaststroke. Waddell later competed at the 1996 Summer Paralympics in Atlanta where she won a gold, silver, and bronze medal.

== Early life ==
Waddell was born to parents Norman and Carol Waddell and raised in Pascagoula, Mississippi. She graduated from Pascagoula High School in 1979 and earned her Bachelor of Arts degree in criminal justice from the University of Southern Mississippi in 1983. Following her marriage to Daniel Howard Black, she moved to Michigan and began working as an advertising executive for the Lansing State Journal.

== Career ==
While living in Michigan, Waddell competed in a swimming meet during the National Convention of Little People of America where she won two gold medals and nearly beat the world record. After receiving praise for her performance, she began to train harder and became more serious about the sport, leading her to earn a spot on the U.S. Paralympics Swimming Team. Waddell competed in the 100-meter breaststroke competition at the 1992 Summer Paralympics where she set a new world record with a time of 1:54.56. She also won a silver medal during the S6 50-meter freestyle.

As a result of her performance, Waddell was again selected to compete with Team USA at the 1996 Summer Paralympics, where she won a gold, silver, and bronze medal. She also beat her previous 100-meter breaststroke world record with a time of 1:53.48.
