= José Luis Arribas Granados =

Spanish swimmer

José Arribas
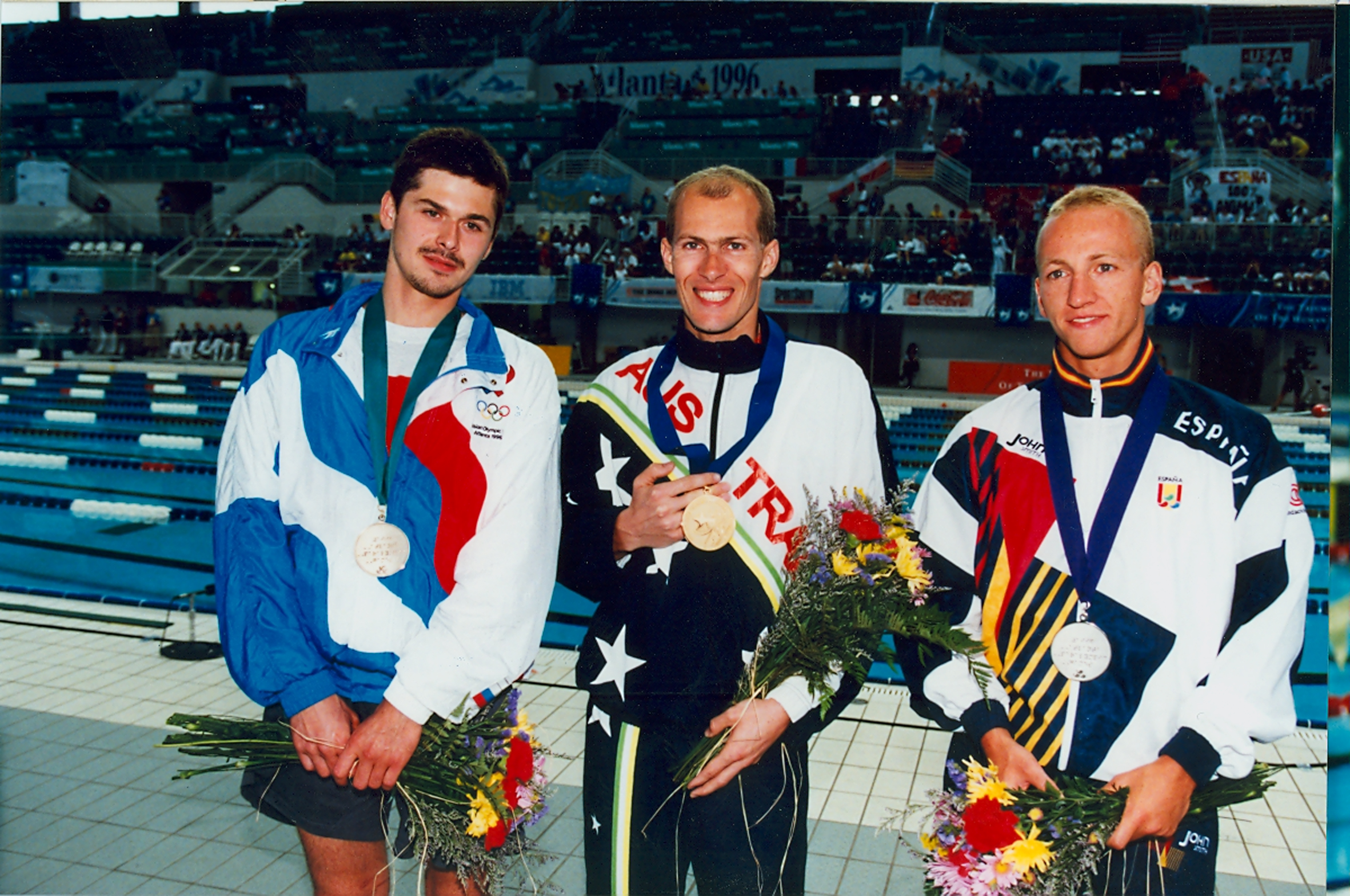
- On the podium in Atlanta

Personal information
- Full name: José Luis Arribas Granados
- Nationality: Spain
- Born: 14 September 1975 (age 50)

Sport
- Sport: Swimming
Medal record
Men's swimming
Representing Spain
Paralympic Games
Silver medal – second place	1996 Atlanta	100m breaststroke SB12

Jose Luis Arribas Granados (born 14 January 1975 in Madrid) is a vision impaired B2/S12 swimmer from Spain. He competed at the 1996 Summer Paralympics, winning a silver medal in the breaststroke.
