= Pablo Saavedra Reinado =

Spanish swimmer

Personal information
- Nationality: Spanish
- Born: January 29, 1975 (age 51) Pontevedra

Sport
- Country: Spain
- Sport: Swimming (S9)
Medal record
Swimming
Representing Spain
Paralympic Games
Bronze medal – third place	1996 Atlanta	4x100m freestyle relay S7-10
World Championships
Silver medal – second place	1998 Christchurch	4x100m freestyle open
Bronze medal – third place	1998 Christchurch	50m freestyle S9
Bronze medal – third place	1998 Christchurch	100m freestyle S9
Bronze medal – third place	1998 Christchurch	100m butterfly S9

Pablo Saavedra Reinado (born January 29, 1975, in Pontevedra) is an S9 swimmer from Spain. He competed at the 1996 Summer Paralympics, winning a bronze medal in 4 x 100 meter 34 point freestyle relay race. He competed at the 1992 Summer Paralympics and 2000 Summer Paralympics, where he did not medal at either Games.
