= Mireia Riera Casanovas =

Spanish swimmer

Personal information
- Nationality: Spanish
- Born: Lloret de Mar, Barcelona

Sport
- Country: Spain
- Sport: Swimming (S7)
Medal record
Swimming
Representing Spain
Paralympic Games
Silver medal – second place	1996 Atlanta	100m freestyle S7
Bronze medal – third place	1996 Atlanta	400m freestyle S7

Mireia Riera Casanovas (born in Lloret de Mar, Barcelona) is an S7 swimmer from Spain. She has cerebral palsy. She competed at the 1996 Summer Paralympics, winning a silver medal in the 100 meter freestyle race, and a bronze medal in the 400 meter freestyle race.
