= María Martorell =

Spanish politician

María Martorell Pallás
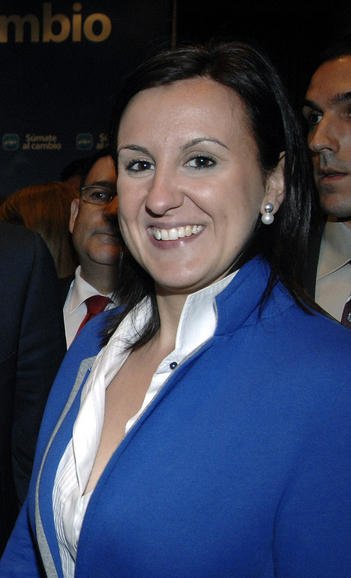

Member of the Spanish Congress of Deputies
- In office March 2000 – May 2000
- Constituency: Valencia

Minister for the Environment of Valencian Community
- Incumbent
- Assumed office May 2000

Personal details
- Born: 28 March 1942 (age 84) Valencia, Spain
- Party: People's Party (PP)
- Children: 2
- Education: University of Valencia
- Profession: Philosopher, Professor, Politician

María Martorell Pallás (born 28 March 1942 in Valencia, Spain) is a Spanish politician affiliated with the People's Party (PP). She has had a distinguished career in academia and politics, particularly in the field of education and environmental policy.

== Academic career ==
Martorell holds a doctorate in philosophy and has dedicated much of her professional life to academia. She serves as a professor in the faculty of philosophy at the University of Valencia, where she has contributed to research and teaching in her field. In addition to her role as an educator, she has published several books and academic works on education and philosophy.

== Political career ==
Martorell's political career has been closely linked to education and environmental policy. She served as the Director General of University Teaching and Research within the Valencian regional administration, overseeing higher education policies and research initiatives.

In March 2000, she was elected as a Member of the Spanish Congress of Deputies, representing the Valencia region under the People's Party (PP). However, her tenure in the national legislature was short-lived, as she resigned two months later in May 2000 after being appointed as Minister for the Environment in the Valencian regional government.

== Personal life ==
Martorell is divorced and has two daughters. Outside of her professional and political commitments, she has continued to be active in academic research and publications.

== Publications ==
She has authored multiple academic works in the field of philosophy and education.
