= Syreeta van Amelsvoort =

Dutch Paralympic swimmer

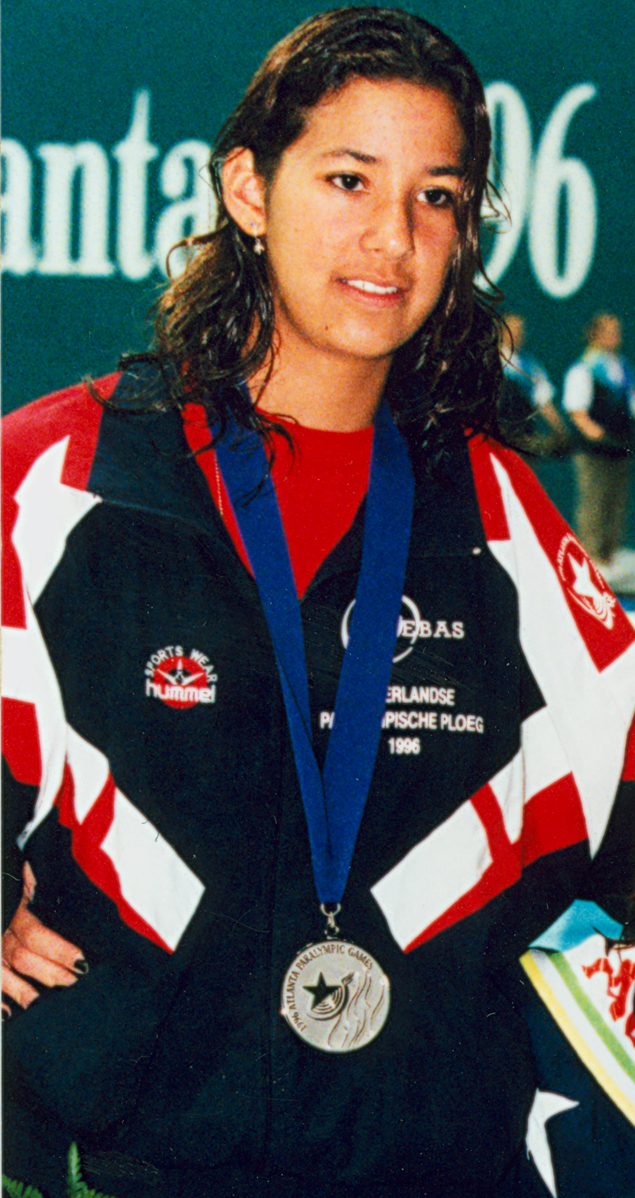
- van Amelsvoort in 1996

Sport
- Country: Netherlands
- Sport: Para swimming
- Disability class: S8
Medal record
Paralympic Games
Gold medal – first place	1996 Atlanta	100 m butterfly S8
Gold medal – first place	2000 Sydney	100 m butterfly S8
Silver medal – second place	1996 Atlanta	200 m medley SM8
Bronze medal – third place	1996 Atlanta	100 m breaststroke SB8

Syreeta van Amelsvoort is a Dutch Paralympic swimmer. She represented the Netherlands at the 1996 Summer Paralympics and at the 2000 Summer Paralympics and in total she won two gold medals, one silver medal and one bronze medal. She won a gold medal on each occasion. In 1996, she also won a silver and a bronze medal.

In 2000 she received the Order of the Netherlands Lion decoration.
