= Kay Espenhayn =

German Paralympic swimmer

Personal information
- Nickname: Goldfish
- Born: 20 August 1968 Leipzig, East Germany
- Died: 15 September 2002 (aged 34) Leipzig, Germany

Sport
- Country: Germany
- Sport: Paralympic swimming
- Disability: Paraplegia
- Disability class: S4
Medal record
Paralympic swimming
Representing Germany
Paralympic Games
| Gold medal – first place | 1996 Atlanta | Women's 50m backstroke S4 |
| Gold medal – first place | 1996 Atlanta | Women's 200m freestyle S4 |
| Gold medal – first place | 1996 Atlanta | Women's 150m individual medley SM4 |
| Silver medal – second place | 1996 Atlanta | Women's 50m freestyle S4 |
| Silver medal – second place | 1996 Atlanta | Women's 100m freestyle S4 |
| Silver medal – second place | 2000 Sydney | Women's 50m freestyle S4 |
| Silver medal – second place | 2000 Sydney | Women's 100m freestyle S4 |
| Silver medal – second place | 2000 Sydney | Women's 200m freestyle S4 |
| Silver medal – second place | 2000 Sydney | Women's 150m individual medley SM4 |
| Silver medal – second place | 2000 Sydney | Women's 4x50m medley relay |
| Bronze medal – third place | 1996 Atlanta | Women's 50m breaststroke SB3 |

Kay Espenhayn (20 August 1968 - 15 September 2002) was a former German Paralympic swimmer. She was born in a Christian family and was the first German to become a UNICEF ambassador in disabled sports.

== Swimming career ==
Espenhayn studied at the Leipzig Medical School in 1986 to 1989 where she got a job at Diakonissenhaus Leipzig as a medical technical laboratory assistant after graduation. During her studies, she attended a regular swimming group and became a lifeguard at the Kulkwitzer See near her hometown on the border of the Baltic Sea.

In 1989, Espenhayn had a swollen lymph node removed from her neck but the operation went wrong and it inadvertently cut through a nerve which affected her cervical spine, right shoulder joint, and right arm which restricted most movement in her right arm. After the operation, she quit her job and focused on swimming and joined the Leipzig Disabled Sports Club. In 1993, she suffered from spinal disc damage from her nursing job, she had surgery on her spine and six-month hospital stay, she was diagnosed with complete paraplegia from the fifth thoracic vertebrae and spent the rest of her life in a wheelchair.

In 1994, she began competitive swimming at the Saxony Championships in April, the German championships in July of that year. Her first international appearance was at the Dutch championships in 1995 where she swam four world records at the European Championships in Perpignan. Tragedy struck in December 1995 when Espenhayn was involved in a car accident in Kreischa and was then told by doctors that she wouldn't walk again. Once she was discharged from hospital in March 1996, she was able to participate in the German Open championships and qualified for the 1996 Summer Paralympics in Atlanta where she won six medals: three gold, two silver and one bronze and qualified again for the 2000 Summer Paralympics in Sydney, where she won five silver medals.

== Death ==
Espenhayn died of complications to lung, kidney and heart disease in a hospital in Leipzig on 15 September 2002.
