= Enrique Tornero Hernández =

Spanish Paralympic swimmer

Enrique Tornero
Personal information
- Full name: Enrique Tornero Hernández
- Nationality: Spanish
- Born: 30 May 1980 (age 46) Plasencia, Cáceres, Spain

Sport
- Country: Spain
- Sport: Swimming (S9)
Medal record
Swimming
Representing Spain
Paralympic Games
Gold medal – first place	1996 Atlanta	400m freestyle S9
Silver medal – second place	2000 Sydney	400m freestyle S9
Bronze medal – third place	1996 Atlanta	4x100m freestyle relay S7-10
World Championships
Gold medal – first place	1998 Christchurch	100m freestyle S9
Gold medal – first place	1998 Christchurch	400m freestyle S9
Silver medal – second place	1998 Christchurch	1500m freestyle open

Enrique Tornero Hernández (born 30 May 1980 in Plasencia, Cáceres) is an S9 swimmer from Spain. He competed at the 1996 Summer Paralympics, winning a gold medal in the 400 meter freestyle race and a bronze medal in the 4 x 100 meter 34 points freestyle relay. He competed at the 2000 Summer Paralympics, winning a silver medal in the 400 meter freestyle race.
