= Alwin de Groot =

Dutch Paralympic swimmer

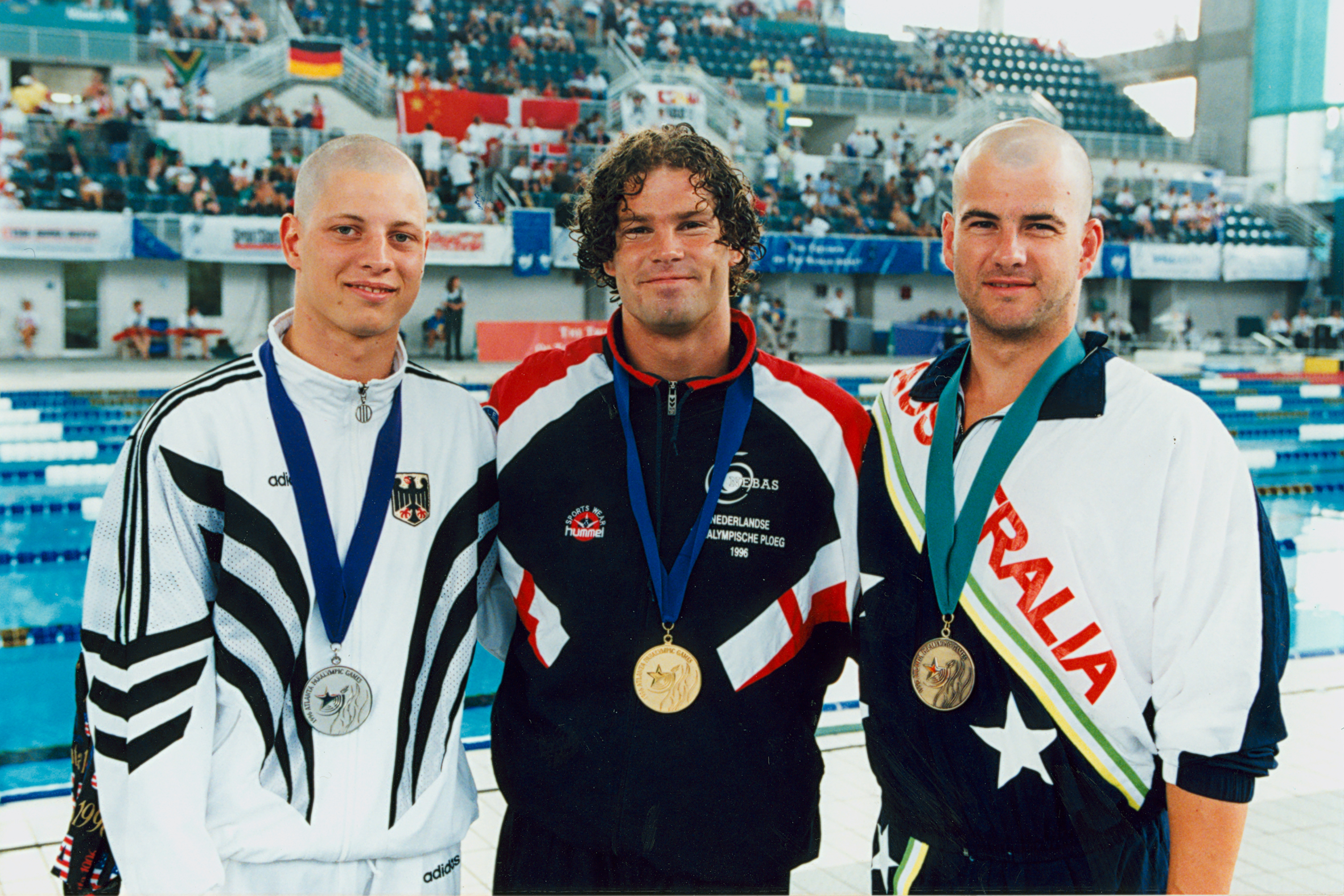
- Alwin de Groot (middle)
Medal record
Men's para swimming
Representing Netherlands
Paralympic Games
Gold medal – first place	1992 Barcelona	100 m backstroke S10
Gold medal – first place	1996 Atlanta	50 m freestyle S10
Gold medal – first place	1996 Atlanta	100 m backstroke S10
Gold medal – first place	1996 Atlanta	100 m freestyle S10
Gold medal – first place	1996 Atlanta	200 m medley SM10
Gold medal – first place	1996 Atlanta	400 m freestyle S10
Silver medal – second place	1992 Barcelona	100 m freestyle S10
Silver medal – second place	1992 Barcelona	200 m individual medley SM10
Silver medal – second place	1992 Barcelona	4×100 m medley relay S7–10
Silver medal – second place	1996 Atlanta	100 m breaststroke SB9
Silver medal – second place	1996 Atlanta	100 m butterfly S10
Bronze medal – third place	1992 Barcelona	400 m freestyle S10
Bronze medal – third place	1996 Atlanta	4×100 m medley S7–10

Alwin de Groot is a Dutch Paralympic swimmer. He represented the Netherlands at the 1992 Summer Paralympics and at the 1996 Summer Paralympics.

In total, he won six gold medals, five silver medals and two bronze medals at the Summer Paralympics.
