= Jeff Hardy (swimmer) =

Australian Paralympic swimmer

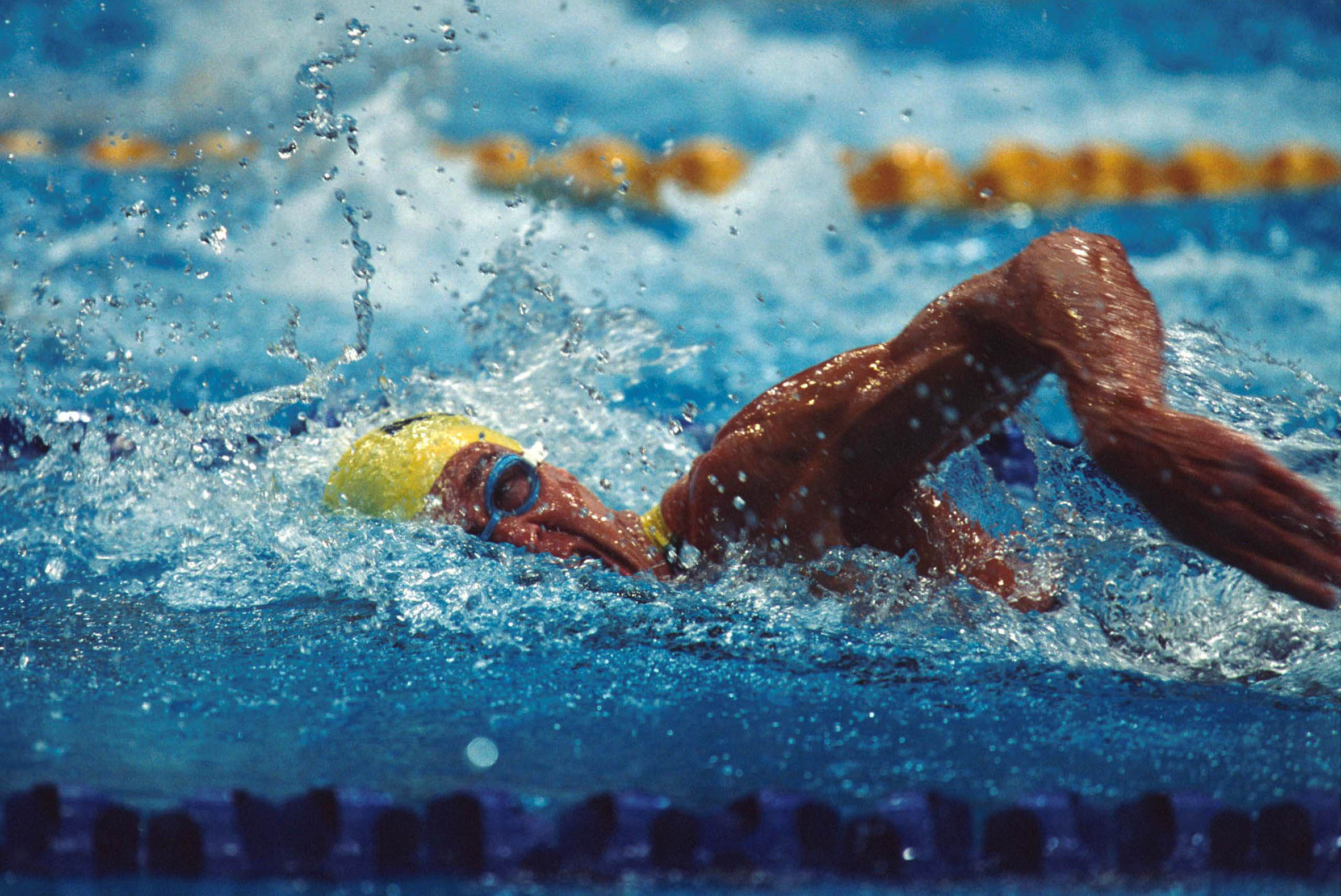
- Close up of Hardy in action at the pool at the 2000 Summer Paralympics

Personal information
- Full name: Jeffrey Lewis Hardy
- Nationality: Australia
- Born: 13 March 1959 (age 67) Narrabri, New South Wales
Medal record
Swimming
Paralympic Games
| Gold medal – first place | 1996 Atlanta | Men's 100 m Butterfly B2 |
| Gold medal – first place | 1996 Atlanta | Men's 400 m Freestyle B2 |
| Gold medal – first place | 2000 Sydney | Men's 400 m Freestyle S12 |
| Bronze medal – third place | 1996 Atlanta | Men's 200 m Medley B2 |

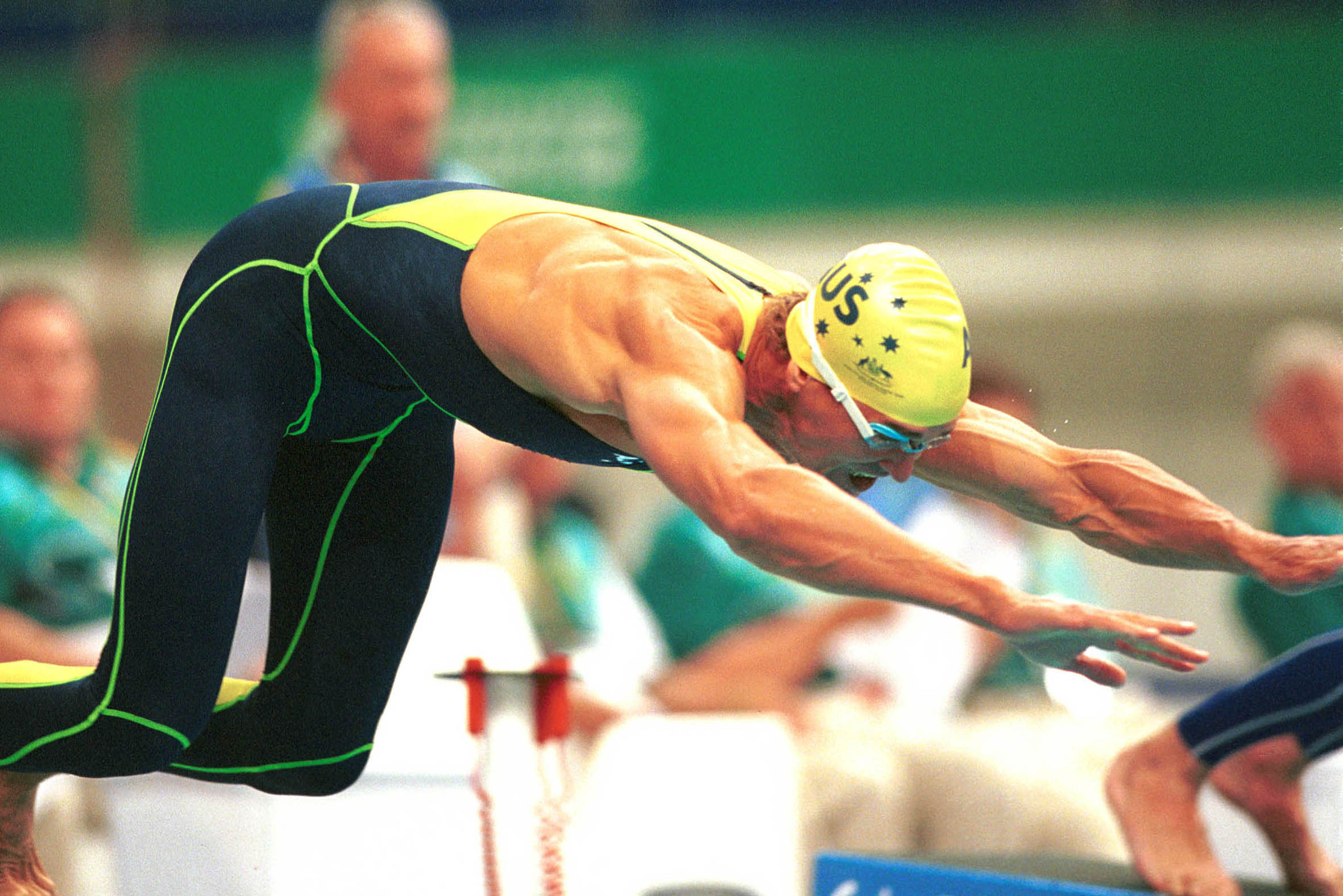
Hardy dives into the pool during competition at the 2000 Summer Paralympics

Jeffrey "Jeff" Lewis Hardy, OAM (born 13 March 1959) is an Australian swimmer with a vision impairment. Hardy was born in the New South Wales town of Narrabri. At the 1996 Atlanta Paralympics, he won two gold medals in the Men's 100 m Butterfly B2 and Men's 400 m Freestyle B2 events, for which he received a Medal of the Order of Australia, and a bronze medal in the Men's 200 m Medley B2 event. On 16 November 1997 in Brisbane, he set a 1500 m S12 world record that has remained unsurpassed as of August 2017, with a time of 18:57.10. At the 2000 Sydney Paralympics, he won a gold medal in the Men's 400 m Freestyle S12 event. In 2001, he was inducted into the Sunshine Coast Sports Hall of Fame.
