= Aaron Bidois =

New Zealand Paralympic swimmer

Medal record

Men's para swimming

Representing New Zealand

Paralympic Games
Silver medal – second place	1996 Atlanta	100 m breaststroke SB6

Aaron Bidois (born September 12, 1975) is a paralympic swimmer from New Zealand competing mainly in category SB6 events.

Bidois competed in two Paralympics, firstly in 1992 in Barcelona and then again in 1996 in Atlanta. In 1992 he left medalless after finishing fourth in the heat of the 100m backstroke, fifth in the final of the breaststroke, fifth in his heat of the 100m freestyle, 200m medley and 50m freestyle. In 1996 he was seventeenth in the 50m freestyle heats, fifteenth in the 100m freestyle heats, fourth in the 200m medley final and won a silver medal in the 100m breaststroke.

Bidois also represented New Zealand at the 1994 Commonwealth Games in Victoria, Canada. He swam in the 100 m freestyle S9, recording a time of 1:10.62 in his heat, and not progressing to the final.

Bidois was born in Aukland, New Zealand. He is a member of the Ngāti Ranginui, a Māori iwi (tribe) in the Bay of Plenty.
