= Gemma Dashwood =

Australian Paralympic swimmer

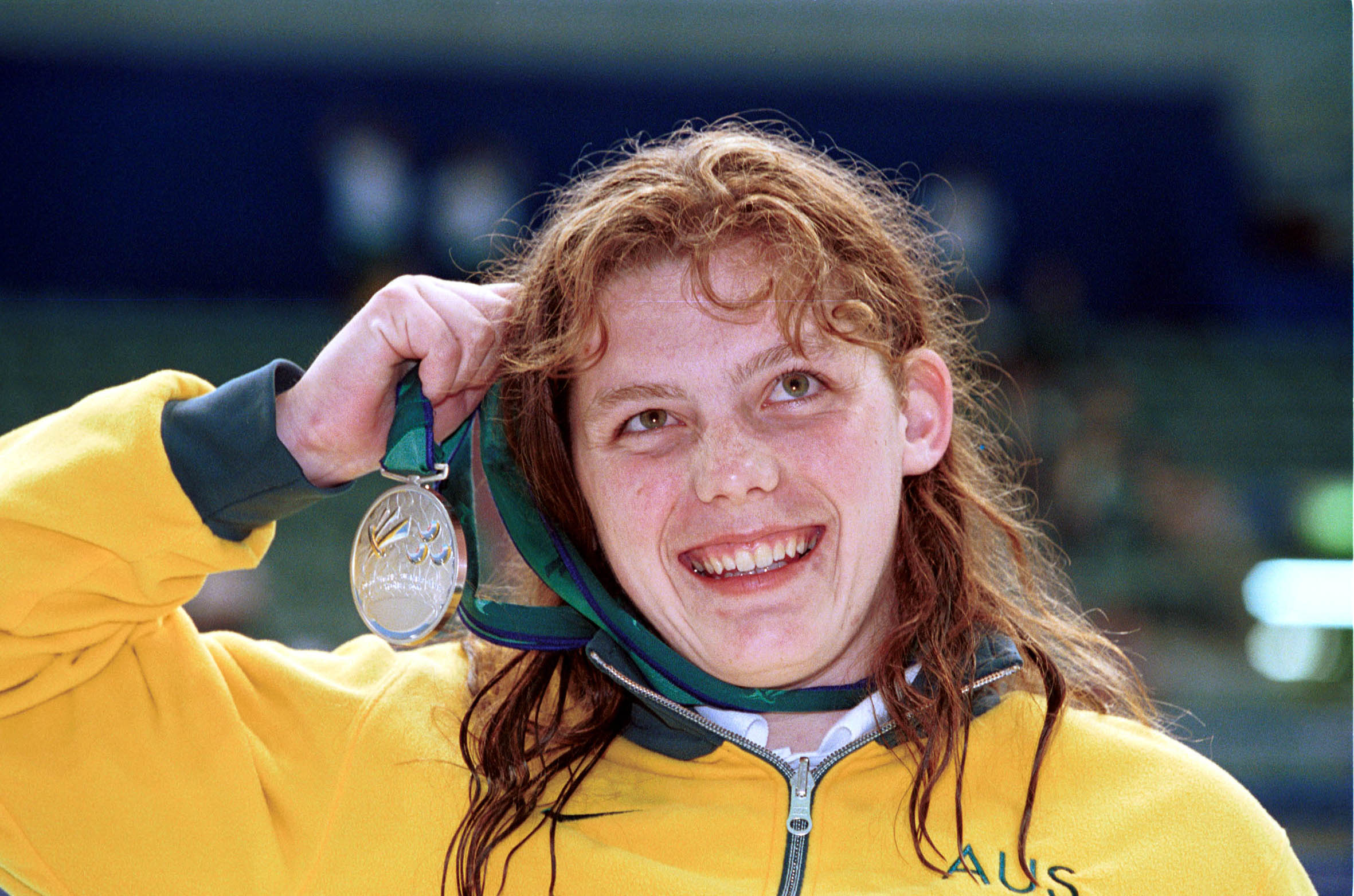
- Dashwood at the 2000 Summer Paralympics

Personal information
- Full name: Gemma Joan Dashwood
- Nationality: Australia
- Born: 19 October 1977 (age 48) Canberra
Medal record
Swimming
Paralympic Games
Gold medal – first place	1996 Atlanta	Women's 100 m Butterfly S10
Gold medal – first place	1996 Atlanta	Women's 400 m Freestyle S10
Gold medal – first place	1996 Atlanta	Women's 4x100 m Freestyle S7-10
Gold medal – first place	2000 Sydney	Women's 400 m Freestyle S10
Silver medal – second place	1996 Atlanta	Women's 100 m Freestyle S10
Silver medal – second place	1996 Atlanta	Women's 200 m Medley SM10
Silver medal – second place	2000 Sydney	Women's 200 m Medley SM10
Bronze medal – third place	2000 Sydney	Women's 4x100 m Freestyle 34 pts
IPC Swimming World Championships
Gold medal – first place	1994 Valletta	100 m Butterfly S10
Gold medal – first place	1994 Valletta	400 m Freestyle S10
Silver medal – second place	1994 Valletta	200 m Individual medley SM10
Bronze medal – third place	1994 Valletta	100 m Freestyle S10
Bronze medal – third place	1994 Valletta	100 m Backstroke S10
Gold medal – first place	1998 Christchurch	100 m Butterfly S10
Gold medal – first place	1998 Christchurch	400 m Freestyle S10
Gold medal – first place	1998 Christchurch	800 m Freestyle Open
Silver medal – second place	1998 Christchurch	200 m Individual medley SM10
Silver medal – second place	1998 Christchurch	Women's 4x100 m Freestyle Open
Bronze medal – third place	1998 Christchurch	100 m Backstroke S10

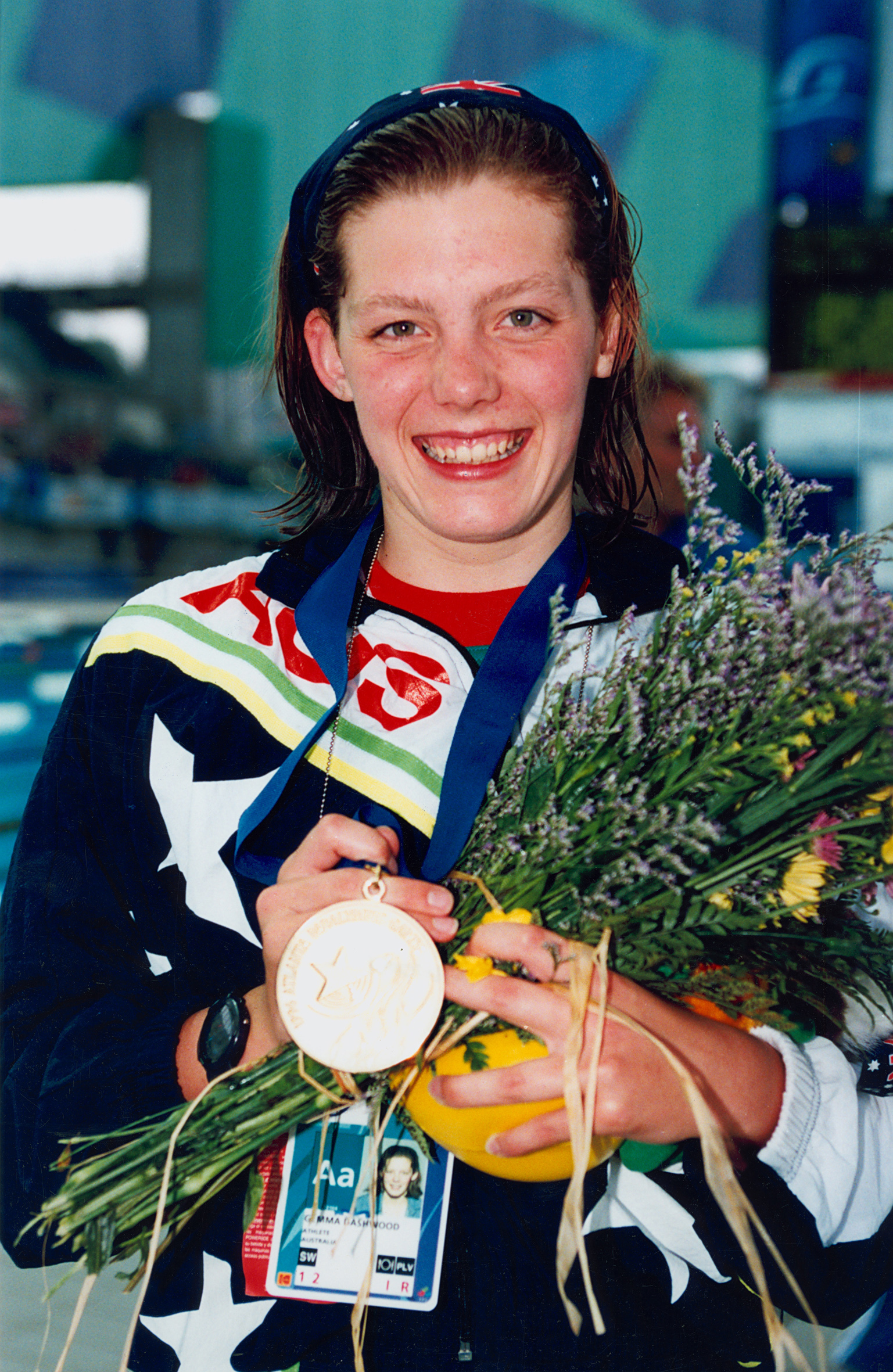
Australian swimmer Gemma Dashwood displays one of the two gold medals she won at the 1996 Atlanta Paralympic Games

Gemma Joan Dashwood, OAM (born 19 October 1977) is an Australian Paralympic swimmer, medical doctor and ordained priest in the Anglican church. She was born in Canberra. She competed in the Les autres disability category due to her septic arthritis.

== Swimming career ==
She won three gold medals at the 1996 Atlanta Games in the Women's 100 m Butterfly S10, Women's 400 m Freestyle S10, and Women's 4 × 100 m Freestyle S7-10 events, for which she received a Medal of the Order of Australia. At the same Games, she won two silver medals in the Women's 100 m Freestyle S10 and Women's 200 m Medley SM10 events. At the 2000 Sydney Games, she won a gold medal in the Women's 400 m Freestyle S10 event, a silver medal in the Women's 200 m Medley SM10 event, and a bronze medal in the Women's 4 × 100 m Freestyle 34 pts event.

She had an Australian Institute of Sport scholarship from 1995 to 2000. In 1997, she moved to Newcastle to study speech therapy at the University of Newcastle and trained under Bill Nelson. She became a member of the University of Newcastle Swimming Club, where she practiced for the Sydney 2000 games. She organised the 'Swimming in Parallel Calendar 2000' to raise the profile of the Australian female Paralympic swim team. In 2000, she received an Australian Sports Medal.

== Medical career ==
Dashwood graduated from Canberra Girls' Grammar School in 1995. She moved to Newcastle, New South Wales to study speech pathology at the University of Newcastle. After completing her degree, she worked in England. She returned to Canberra in 2004 and enrolled in the inaugural Australian National University Medical School class and graduated in 2007. In 2009, she completed her internship with ACT Health. She has worked as an intensive care registrar at Canberra Hospital, Ipswich Hospital, Queensland and Wesley Hospital (Brisbane).

== Personal life ==
Dashwood is a highly regarded amateur musician, playing the organ and cello and singing, and plays the cello with the Australian Doctors' Orchestra.

Dashwood has a long standing involvement with the Anglican Church. She plays organ at St Paul's Ipswich and is an honorary priest, and sings, at St John's Cathedral (Brisbane).
