= Eva Nesheim =

Norwegian Paralympic swimmer

Personal information
- Full name: Eva Renate Nesheim Indrevoll
- Born: 30 September 1975 (age 50) Stavanger, Norway

Sport
- Country: Norway
- Sport: Paralympic swimming
- Disability class: S7
Medal record
Paralympic swimming
Representing Norway
Paralympic Games
Gold medal – first place	1992 Barcelona	50m butterfly S7
Gold medal – first place	1992 Barcelona	400m freestyle S7
Gold medal – first place	1996 Atlanta	50m butterfly S7
Gold medal – first place	1996 Atlanta	200m individual medley SM6
Silver medal – second place	1992 Barcelona	100m freestyle S7
Silver medal – second place	1996 Atlanta	100m backstroke S7
Silver medal – second place	1996 Atlanta	100m breaststroke SB5
World Championships
Gold medal – first place	1994 Malta	50m butterfly S7
Gold medal – first place	1994 Malta	100m backstroke S7
Gold medal – first place	1994 Malta	400m freestyle S7
Bronze medal – third place	1994 Malta	50m freestyle S7

Eva Renate Nesheim Indrevoll (born 30 September 1975) is a Norwegian disabled athlete. She competed in the Summer Paralympic Games three times, She has won eight medals in swimming . She was awarded the Porsgrunds Porselænsfabrik's Honorary Award.

== Career ==
She competed at the 1992 Summer Paralympic Games, where she won a Gold medal in 50 meters butterfly, Gold medal in 400 meters freestyle, and Silver medal in 100 meters freestyle.

She competed at the 1996 Summer Paralympics, where she won Gold medal in 50 meters butterfly, Gold medal in 200 meters medley, Silver medal in 100 meters backstroke, and Silver medal in 100 meters breaststroke.

She competed at the 2000 Summer Paralympics, where she won a Silver medal in 100 meters backstroke.

She competed at the 1994 IPC Swimming World Championships in Malta.
