= Antonio Martorell Sastre =

Spanish swimmer

Antonio Martorell
Personal information
- Full name: Antonio Martorell Sastre
- Nationality: Spanish
- Born: 8 December 1978 (age 47) Inca, Balearic Islands, Spain

Sport
- Country: Spain
- Sport: Swimming (S9)
Medal record
Men's swimming
Representing Spain
Paralympic Games
Bronze medal – third place	1996 Atlanta	4x100 m freestyle S7-10
World Championships
Silver medal – second place	1998 Christchurch	50 m freestyle S9

Antonio Martorell Sastre (born 8 December 1978) is an S9 swimmer from Spain. He competed at the 1996 Summer Paralympics, where he earned a bronze medal in the 4 x 100 freestyle 34 points relay. He competed at the 2000 Summer Paralympics, where he did not medal.
