= Rutger Sturkenboom =

Dutch Paralympic swimmer (born 1970)

Personal information
- Born: 23 February 1970 (age 56)

Sport
- Country: Netherlands
- Sport: Paralympic swimming
Medal record
Summer Paralympics
Bronze medal – third place	1988 Seoul	100 m breaststroke L5
Bronze medal – third place	1988 Seoul	200 m individual medley L5
Bronze medal – third place	1992 Barcelona	100 m breaststroke SB9
Silver medal – second place	1992 Barcelona	4×100 m medley relay S7–10
Silver medal – second place	1996 Atlanta	50 m freestyle S9
Silver medal – second place	1996 Atlanta	100 m freestyle S9
Silver medal – second place	1996 Atlanta	200 m medley SM9
Bronze medal – third place	1996 Atlanta	4×100 m medley S7–10

Rutger Sturkenboom (born 23 February 1970) is a Dutch Paralympic swimmer. He represented the Netherlands at the 1988 Summer Paralympics, at the 1992 Summer Paralympics, at the 1996 Summer Paralympics and at the 2000 Summer Paralympics. In total he won four silver medals and four bronze medals at the Summer Paralympics.
