= Janelle Falzon =

Australian Paralympic swimmer

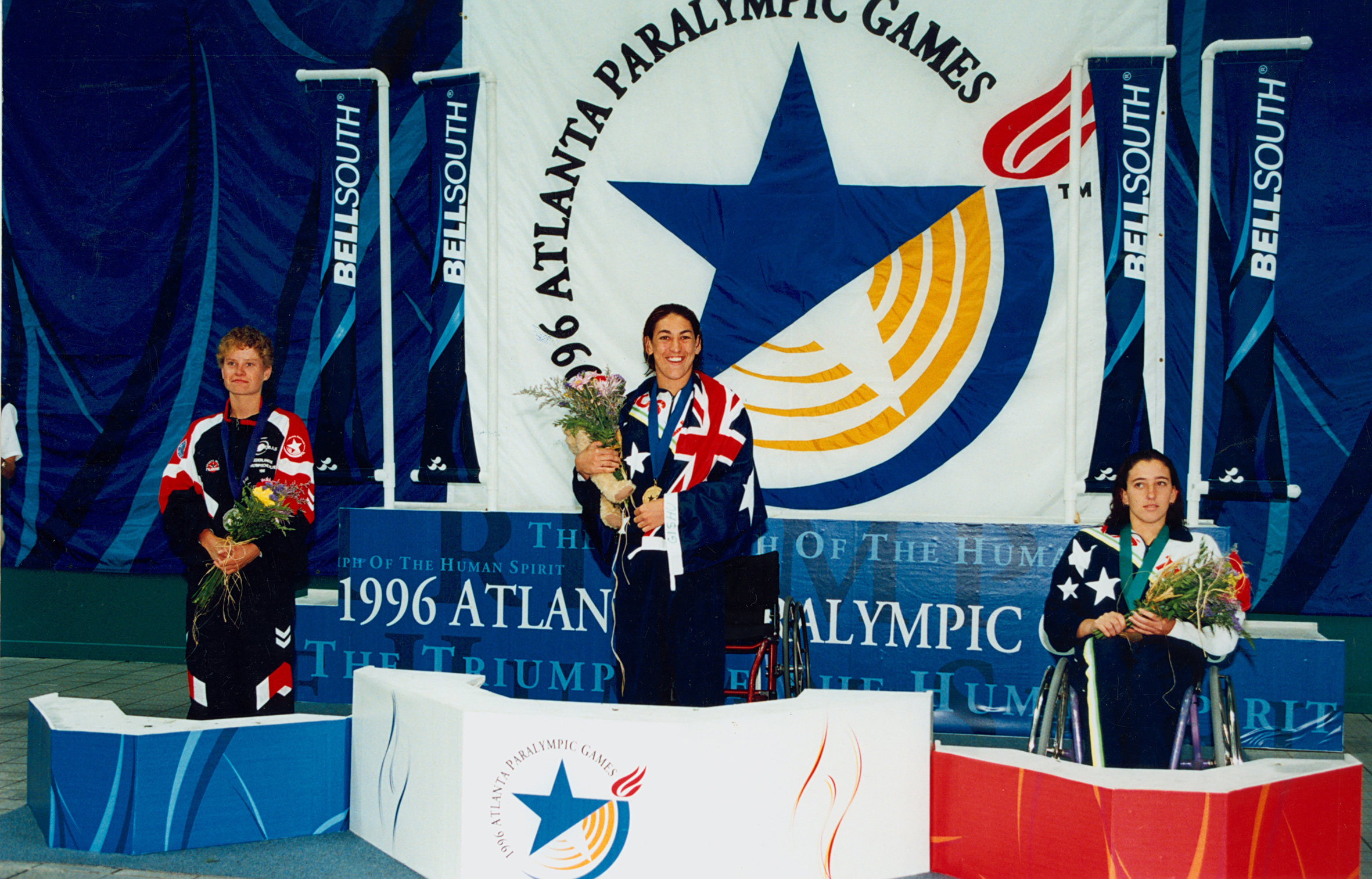
- Australian swimmers Priya Cooper (gold) and Janelle Falzon (bronze) on the medal dais at the 1996 Atlanta Paralympic Games

Personal information
- Full name: Janelle Cherie Falzon
- Nationality: Australia
- Born: 4 April 1981 (age 45) Sydney, New South Wales
Medal record
Swimming
Paralympic Games
Gold medal – first place	1996 Atlanta	4x100 m Freestyle S7-10
Bronze medal – third place	1996 Atlanta	100 m Backstroke S8
Bronze medal – third place	1996 Atlanta	400 m Freestyle S8
IPC Swimming World Championships
Bronze medal – third place	1994 Valletta	100 m Freestyle S8
Bronze medal – third place	1994 Valletta	400 m Freestyle S8
Bronze medal – third place	1998 Christchurch	400 m Freestyle S8

Janelle Cherie Falzon, OAM (born 4 April 1981) is an Australian paralympic swimmer. She was born in Sydney, New South Wales. At the 1996 Summer Paralympics, she won a gold medal in the Women's 4 × 100 m Freestyle S7-10 event, for which she won a Medal of the Order of Australia, and two bronze medals in the Women's 100 m Backstroke S8 and Women's 400 m Freestyle S8 events. At the 1996 games, she competed in but did not medal in the Women's 100 m Freestyle S8 event, the Women's 200 m Medley SM8 event, and the Women's 4 × 100 m Medley S7-10 event. At the 2000 Games, she competed in the 100 m Backstroke S8 event, the 100 m Freestyle S8 event, the 400 m Freestyle S8 event and the 50 m Freestyle S8 event, but did not win any medals at those Games. In 2000, she received an Australian Sports Medal.
