= Duane Kale =

New Zealand swimmer (born 1967)

Duane Kale ONZM
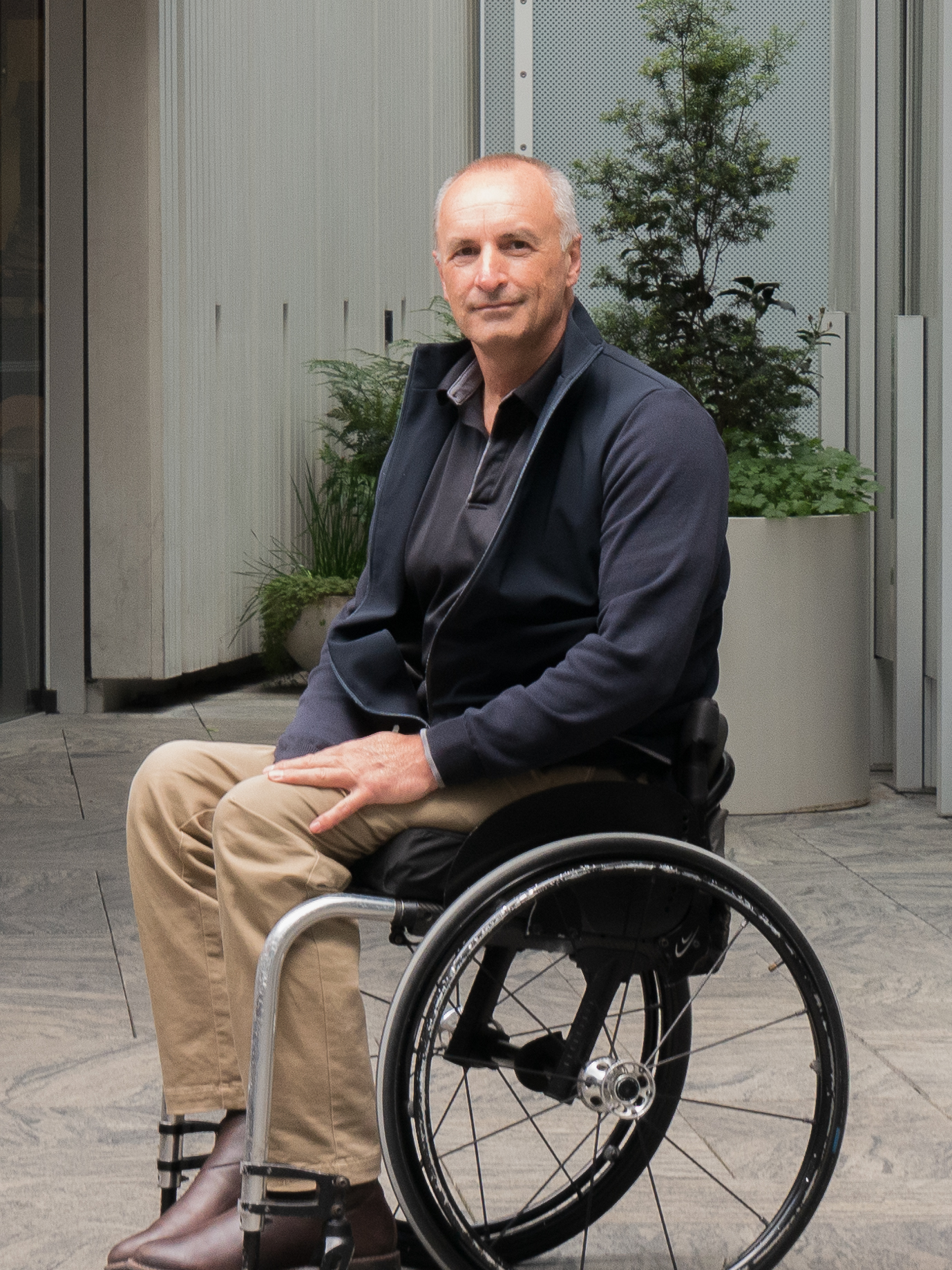
- Kale in 2022

Personal information
- Full name: Duane Paul Kale
- Born: 1 September 1967 (age 58)
Medal record
Men's para swimming
Representing New Zealand
Paralympic Games
Gold medal – first place	1996 Atlanta	50 m butterfly S6
Gold medal – first place	1996 Atlanta	100 m freestyle S6
Gold medal – first place	1996 Atlanta	200 m freestyle S6
Gold medal – first place	1996 Atlanta	200 m medley SM6
Silver medal – second place	1996 Atlanta	50 m freestyle S6
Bronze medal – third place	1996 Atlanta	100 m backstroke S6

Duane Paul Kale ONZM (born 1 September 1967) is a New Zealand Paralympic swimmer.

== Paralympic results ==
Duane Kale won four gold medals, along with a silver and a bronze, at the 1996 Summer Paralympics. This remains the most successful medal haul of any New Zealander in a single Paralympics or Olympics. He competed in the S6 sports class.

== Kale as Chef de Mission ==
Kale retired as an athlete after Atlanta 1996, but went on to be Team Manager at the Sydney 2000 Paralympic Games. He was named Chef de Mission for the New Zealand Paralympic Team at the 2008 and 2012 Summer Paralympics.

== Awards and honours ==
In the 1997 New Year Honours, Kale was appointed an Officer of the New Zealand Order of Merit, for services to swimming.

== Services to the Paralympic Movement internationally ==
In November 2013, he was elected to the International Paralympic Committee Governing Board. He was elected vice president in 2017 and reelected to the position in 2021 for a further four-year term.
