= Aleksei Kapoura =

Russian Paralympic swimmer

Medal record

Swimming

Representing Unified Team

Paralympic Games
| Silver medal – second place | 1992 Barcelona | 100 metre butterfly - S9 |
| Silver medal – second place | 1992 Barcelona | 200m individual medley - SM9 |
| Silver medal – second place | 1996 Atlanta | 100 metre butterfly - S9 |

Aleksei Kapoura (Russian: Алексе́й Анато́льевич Капу́ра; born April 21, 1959) is a paralympic swimmer from Russia competing mainly in category S9 events.

== Career ==
Aleksei competed in the 1992 Summer Paralympics for the Unified team, there he won silver medals in both the 100m butterfly and 200m medley, having set games records in the heats of both events. He also competed in the 50m freestyle finishing fifth, the 100m freestyle finishing fourth and was part of the 4 × 100 m freestyle team that finished seventh and 4 × 100 m medley team that finished sixth. At the 1996 Summer Paralympics Aleksei competed for Russia where he again won the silver medal in the 100m butterfly and finished sixth in the 50m freestyle, eighth in the 100m freestyle and failed to make the final of the 100m backstroke. In 2000 Aleksei failed to match his earlier performances only finishing eighth in the 100m butterfly, he failed to make the final of the 50m freestyle, 100m freestyle or 200m medley and was part of the Russian team that finished eighth in the 4 × 100 m medley.
