= Andrei Nefedov =

Russian Paralympic swimmer

Medal record

Swimming

Representing Russia

Paralympic Games
| Bronze medal – third place | 1996 Atlanta | 200 metres - B3 |

Andrei Nefedov is a paralympic swimmer from Russia competing mainly in category B3 events.

Andrei was part of the Russian Paralympic swimming team that travelled to Atlanta for the 1996 Summer Paralympics there he finished fifth in the 100m breaststroke and won bronze in the 200m breaststroke.
