= 2004 Summer Paralympics medal table =

List of medals won by Paralympic delegations

2004 Summer Paralympics medals
- The Olympic Stadium in Athens
- Location: Athens, Greece

Highlights
- Most gold medals: China (63)
- Most total medals: China (141)
- Medalling NPCs: 75

The 2004 Summer Paralympics, officially known as the Games of the XII Paralympics, were an international summer multi-parasport event for athletes with disabilities governed by the International Paralympic Committee (IPC) held in Athens, Greece from 17 to 28 September 2004. Greece hosted a Paralympic Games for the first time, and it was also the 12th Paralympic Games in history. A total of 3,806 athletes representing 136 National Paralympic Committees (NPC) participated, and 17 NPCs made their Paralympic debuts in Athens. The Games featured 519 events in 19 sports across 20 disciplines, including the Paralympic debut of football 5-a-side.

Athletes from 75 countries had won at least one medal, leaving 61 nations without a medal. Angola, Azerbaijan, Bosnia and Herzegovina, Botswana, Cyprus, Iraq, Latvia, Morocco, Serbia and Montenegro, and Turkey won their nation's first Paralympic gold medals. They were also the first Paralympic medals of any kind for Angola, Botswana, Cyprus, Macedonia, Rwanda, Serbia and Montenegro, and Turkey. The official medal was created and cut by designer Konstantinos Kazakos. It features an engraving of the Parthenon on top of the Acropolis as well as the Games' name in Greek above it. The reverse face shows the Games' logo above its name. Below that are three Tae-Geuks as well as the phrase "Athens 2004" in braille.

China led the medal table both in number of gold medals won and in overall medals, with 63 and 141 respectively. It was the first time that the nation led the medal count in overall medals won. Among individual participants, Japan's Mayumi Narita and the United States's Erin Popovich won the most gold medals at the Games with seven each in swimming. Canada's Stephanie Dixon (one gold, six silver and one bronze), Belarus's Raman Makarau (three gold, three silver and two bronze) and Narita (seven gold and one bronze) won the most overall medals at the Games with eight each in total.

== Medal table ==
The ranking in this table is based on information provided by the IPC and is consistent with IPC convention in its published medal tables. By default, the table is ordered by the number of gold medals the athletes from a nation have won (in this context, a "nation" is an entity represented by a National Paralympic Committee). The number of silver medals is next considered, followed by the number of bronze medals. If nations remain tied, they are ranked equally and listed alphabetically by IPC country code.

In the mixed dressage championship Grade II Individual event, there was a tie for third place which resulted in two bronze medals being issued. In the women's table tennis class 1–3 team competition, only a gold medal was awarded to the winning team.

Key

‡ Changes in medal standings (see below)

* Host nation (Greece)

2004 Summer Paralympics medal table (Note: Figures in table reflect all official changes in medal standings.)
Rank	Nation	Gold	Silver	Bronze	Total
1	China (CHN)‡	63	46	32	141
2	Great Britain (GBR)	35	30	29	94
3	Canada (CAN)	28	19	25	72
4	United States (USA)	27	22	39	88
5	Australia (AUS)‡	26	39	36	101
6	Ukraine (UKR)	24	12	19	55
7	Spain (ESP)	20	27	24	71
8	Germany (GER)	19	28	31	78
9	France (FRA)	18	26	30	74
10	Japan (JPN)‡	17	15	20	52
11	Russia (RUS)	16	8	17	41
12	Czech Republic (CZE)	16	8	7	31
13	South Africa (RSA)	15	13	7	35
14	Brazil (BRA)	14	12	7	33
15	Mexico (MEX)	14	10	10	34
16	South Korea (KOR)	11	11	6	28
17	Hong Kong (HKG)	11	7	1	19
18	Poland (POL)	10	25	19	54
19	Belarus (BLR)	10	12	7	29
20	Austria (AUT)‡	8	10	4	22
21	Sweden (SWE)	8	7	6	21
22	Tunisia (TUN)	8	7	3	18
23	Iran (IRI)	7	3	13	23
24	Egypt (EGY)	6	9	8	23
25	Algeria (ALG)	6	2	5	13
26	New Zealand (NZL)	6	1	3	10
27	Netherlands (NED)‡	5	12	12	29
28	Nigeria (NGR)	5	4	3	12
29	Denmark (DEN)	5	3	7	15
30	Slovakia (SVK)	5	3	4	12
31	Italy (ITA)	4	8	7	19
32	Israel (ISR)	4	4	5	13
33	Finland (FIN)	4	1	3	8
34	Greece (GRE)*	3	13	4	20
35	Thailand (THA)	3	6	6	15
36	Belgium (BEL)	3	2	2	7
37	Kenya (KEN)	3	1	3	7
38	Norway (NOR)	3	1	1	5
39	Angola (ANG)	3	0	0	3
40	Switzerland (SUI)	2	6	8	16
41	Portugal (POR)	2	5	5	12
42	Morocco (MAR)	2	4	0	6
43	Cuba (CUB)‡	2	2	7	11
44	Chinese Taipei (TPE)	2	2	2	6
45	Azerbaijan (AZE)	2	1	1	4
46	Hungary (HUN)‡	1	8	10	19
47	Iceland (ISL)	1	3	0	4
48	Kuwait (KUW)	1	2	3	6
49	Slovenia (SLO)‡	1	2	1	4
50	Lithuania (LTU)	1	1	5	7
51	United Arab Emirates (UAE)	1	1	2	4
52	Latvia (LAT)	1	1	1	3
53	India (IND)‡	1	0	1	2
53	Iraq (IRQ)‡	1	0	1	2
53	Jamaica (JAM)	1	0	1	2
53	Turkey (TUR)	1	0	1	2
57	Bosnia and Herzegovina (BIH)	1	0	0	1
57	Botswana (BOT)	1	0	0	1
57	Cyprus (CYP)	1	0	0	1
57	Zimbabwe (ZIM)	1	0	0	1
61	Ireland (IRL)	0	3	1	4
62	Argentina (ARG)	0	2	2	4
63	Venezuela (VEN)	0	1	2	3
64	Jordan (JOR)	0	1	1	2
64	Palestine (PLE)	0	1	1	2
66	Bahrain (BRN)	0	1	0	1
66	Estonia (EST)	0	1	0	1
66	Macedonia (MKD)	0	1	0	1
66	Panama (PAN)	0	1	0	1
70	Croatia (CRO)	0	0	4	4
71	Peru (PER)	0	0	2	2
71	Serbia and Montenegro (SCG)	0	0	2	2
73	Faroe Islands (FRO)	0	0	1	1
73	Puerto Rico (PUR)	0	0	1	1
73	Rwanda (RWA)	0	0	1	1
Totals (75 entries)		520	517	532	1,569

== Changes in medal standings ==
List of official changes in medal standings
Ruling date	Event	Athlete (NPC)	1st place, gold medalist(s)	2nd place, silver medalist(s)	3rd place, bronze medalist(s)	Net change	Comment
24 September 2004	Judo, men's 60kg	Sergio Arturo Perez (CUB) DSQ	−1			−1	On 24 September 2004, Cuban judo competitor Sergio Arturo Perez tested positive for the anti-inflammatory agent and banned substance prednisolone. Perez forfeited the gold medal he won in the men's 60kg judo competition.
26 September 2004	Powerlifting, men's 56kg	Youssef Cheikh Younes (SYR) DSQ			−1	−1	Youssef Cheikh Younes of Syria was stripped of his bronze medal in the men's 56kg powerlifting event after testing positive for the banned anabolic agents nandrolone and stanozolol.
26 September 2004	Powerlifting, men's 56kg	Rajinder Singh Rahelu (IND)			+1	+1	Youssef Cheikh Younes of Syria was stripped of his bronze medal in the men's 56kg powerlifting event after testing positive for the banned anabolic agents nandrolone and stanozolol.
26 September 2004	Powerlifting, Men's 60 kg	Ali Hosseini (IRN) DSQ			−1	−1	Ali Hosseini of Iran tested positive for the banned anabolic agent metandienone and was stripped of the bronze medal he won in the men's 60 kg powerlifting competition.
26 September 2004	Powerlifting, Men's 60 kg	Yu Jian (CHN)			+1	+1	Ali Hosseini of Iran tested positive for the banned anabolic agent metandienone and was stripped of the bronze medal he won in the men's 60 kg powerlifting competition.
26 September 2004	Cycling, Men's sprint tandem B1-3	Vladislav Janovjak (SLO) DSQ		−1		−1	Slovakia's Juraj Petrovic and visually-impaired cyclist Vladislav Janovjak lost the silver medal they won at the men's sprint tandem B1-3 cycling event after Petrovic tested positive for the banned glucocorticosteroid, methylprednisolone.
26 September 2004	Cycling, Men's sprint tandem B1-3	Juraj Petrovic (SLO) DSQ		−1		−1	Slovakia's Juraj Petrovic and visually-impaired cyclist Vladislav Janovjak lost the silver medal they won at the men's sprint tandem B1-3 cycling event after Petrovic tested positive for the banned glucocorticosteroid, methylprednisolone.
26 September 2004	Cycling, Men's sprint tandem B1-3	Shigeo Yoshihara (JPN)		+1	–1	0	Slovakia's Juraj Petrovic and visually-impaired cyclist Vladislav Janovjak lost the silver medal they won at the men's sprint tandem B1-3 cycling event after Petrovic tested positive for the banned glucocorticosteroid, methylprednisolone.
26 September 2004	Cycling, Men's sprint tandem B1-3	Takuya Oki (JPN)		+1	–1	0	Slovakia's Juraj Petrovic and visually-impaired cyclist Vladislav Janovjak lost the silver medal they won at the men's sprint tandem B1-3 cycling event after Petrovic tested positive for the banned glucocorticosteroid, methylprednisolone.
26 September 2004	Cycling, Men's sprint tandem B1-3	Anthony Biddle (AUS)			+1	+1	Slovakia's Juraj Petrovic and visually-impaired cyclist Vladislav Janovjak lost the silver medal they won at the men's sprint tandem B1-3 cycling event after Petrovic tested positive for the banned glucocorticosteroid, methylprednisolone.
26 September 2004	Cycling, Men's sprint tandem B1-3	Kial Stewart (AUS)			+1	+1	Slovakia's Juraj Petrovic and visually-impaired cyclist Vladislav Janovjak lost the silver medal they won at the men's sprint tandem B1-3 cycling event after Petrovic tested positive for the banned glucocorticosteroid, methylprednisolone.
15 November 2004	Men's shot put F36	Wolfgang Dubin (AUT) DSQ		−1		−1	Wolfgang Dubin of Austria was stripped of his silver medal in the men's shot put F36 event after testing positive for the banned stimulant propylhexedrine.
15 November 2004	Men's shot put F36	Willem Noorduin (NED)		+1	–1	0	Wolfgang Dubin of Austria was stripped of his silver medal in the men's shot put F36 event after testing positive for the banned stimulant propylhexedrine.
15 November 2004	Men's shot put F36	Nicholas Larionow (AUS)			+1	+1	Wolfgang Dubin of Austria was stripped of his silver medal in the men's shot put F36 event after testing positive for the banned stimulant propylhexedrine.
15 November 2004	Powerlifting, Men's +100 kg	Seyed Habibollah Mousavi (IRN) DSQ	−1			−1	Seyed Habibollah Mousavi of Iran tested positive for the banned anabolic agent metandienone and was stripped of his gold medal in the men's +100 kg powerlifting event.
15 November 2004	Powerlifting, Men's +100 kg	Faris Abed (IRQ)	+1	–1		0	Seyed Habibollah Mousavi of Iran tested positive for the banned anabolic agent metandienone and was stripped of his gold medal in the men's +100 kg powerlifting event.
15 November 2004	Powerlifting, Men's +100 kg	Darren Gardiner (AUS)		+1	–1	0	Seyed Habibollah Mousavi of Iran tested positive for the banned anabolic agent metandienone and was stripped of his gold medal in the men's +100 kg powerlifting event.
15 November 2004	Powerlifting, Men's +100 kg	Csaba Szavai (HUN)			+1	+1	Seyed Habibollah Mousavi of Iran tested positive for the banned anabolic agent metandienone and was stripped of his gold medal in the men's +100 kg powerlifting event.

List of official changes by country
NOC	Gold	Silver	Bronze	Net change
Iran (IRN)	−1	0	−1	−2
Slovenia (SLO)	0	−2	0	−2
Cuba (CUB)	−1	0	0	−1
Austria (AUT)	0	−1	0	−1
Syria (SYR)	0	0	−1	−1
Iraq (IRQ)	+1	–1	0	0
Japan (JPN)	0	+2	–2	0
Netherlands (NED)	0	+1	–1	0
China (CHN)	0	0	+1	+1
Hungary (HUN)	0	0	+1	+1
India (IND)	0	0	+1	+1
Australia (AUS)	0	+1	+2	+3

== See also ==
- 2004 Summer Olympics medal table
