= Iraq at the Paralympics =

- IPC code: IRQ
- NPC: Iraqi National Paralympic Committee
- Medals: Gold 4 Silver 8 Bronze 9 Total 21

Summer appearances
- 1992; 1996; 2000; 2004; 2008; 2012; 2016; 2020; 2024

Iraq made its Paralympic Games début at the 1992 Summer Paralympics in Barcelona. It has competed in every edition of the Summer Paralympics since then, but never in the Winter Paralympics. Iraqi Paralympians have won a total of 18 medals: three gold, seven silver and eight bronze.

== Medals by Summer Games ==
Games	Athletes	Gold	Silver	Bronze	Total	Rank
1992 Barcelona	18	0	0	1	1	50
1996 Atlanta	12	0	0	0	0	–
2000 Sydney	5	0	0	0	0	–
2004 Athens	8	1	0	1	2	53
2008 Beijing	20	0	1	1	2	60
2012 London	19	0	2	1	3	59
2016 Rio	14	2	3	0	5	39
2020 Tokyo	19	0	1	2	3	70
2024 Paris	20	1	1	3	5	58
Total		4	8	9	21	55

=== Medals by Summer Sport ===
Sport	Gold	Silver	Bronze	Total
Athletics	2	3	3	8
Powerlifting	1	3	2	6
Wheelchair fencing	0	1	0	1
Totals (3 entries)	3	7	5	15

== Medalists ==
Medal	Name	Games	Sport	Event
Bronze	Ahmed Khalaf	(Spain) 1992 Barcelona	Athletics	Men's discus throw THS3
Gold	Faris Abed	(Greece) 2004 Athens	Powerlifting	Men's +100 kg
Bronze	Thaair Hussin	(Greece) 2004 Athens	Powerlifting	Men's -82.5 kg
Silver	Rasool Mohsin	(China) 2008 Beijing	Powerlifting	Men's -56 kg
Bronze	Thaer al-Ali	(China) 2008 Beijing	Powerlifting	Men's -82.5 kg
Silver	Ahmed Naas	(United Kingdom) 2012 London	Athletics	Men's javelin throw F40
Silver	Faris Abed	(United Kingdom) 2012 London	Powerlifting	Men's +100 kg
Bronze	Wildan Nukhailawi	(United Kingdom) 2012 London	Athletics	Men's javelin throw F40
Gold	Kovan Abdulraheem	(Brazil) 2016 Rio de Janeiro	Athletics	Men's javelin throw F41
Gold	Garrah Tnaiash	(Brazil) 2016 Rio de Janeiro	Athletics	Men's shot put F40
Silver	Wildan Nukhailawi	(Brazil) 2016 Rio de Janeiro	Athletics	Men's javelin throw F41
Silver	Rasool Mohsin	(Brazil) 2016 Rio de Janeiro	Powerlifting	Men's -72 kg
Silver	Ammar Ali	(Brazil) 2016 Rio de Janeiro	Wheelchair fencing	Men's épée B
Silver	Garrah Tnaiash	(Japan) 2020 Tokyo	Athletics	Men's shot put F40
Bronze	Faris Abed	(Japan) 2020 Tokyo	Powerlifting	Men's +107 kg
Bronze	Wildan Nukhailawi	(Japan) 2020 Tokyo	Athletics	Men's javelin throw F41
Bronze	Garrah Tnaiash	(France) 2024 Paris	Athletics	Men's shot put F40
Bronze	Rasool Mohsin	(France) 2024 Paris	Powerlifting	Men's -80 kg
Gold	Najlah Al-Dayyeni	(France) 2024 Paris	Table tennis	Women's individual C6
Bronze	Wildan Nukhailawi	(France) 2024 Paris	Athletics	Men's javelin throw F41
Silver	Zainulabdeen Al-Madhkhoori; Ammar Ali; Hayder Al-Ogaili	(France) 2024 Paris	Wheelchair fencing	Men's épée team

== See also ==
- Iraq at the Olympics
