= Australian Paralympic Powerlifting Team =

Australia has been represented in weightlifting / powerlifting at every Games between 1964 and 2024, with the exception of the 2016 and 2020 games. Australian athletes have won a medal at every Games except 1984, 2012 and 2024. Paralympic powerlifting has been competed at every Summer Paralympics since 1984. Weightlifting had been on the Paralympic program since 1964, however after the 1992 Games the International Paralympic Committee made the decision to drop weightlifting and hold powerlifting events only.

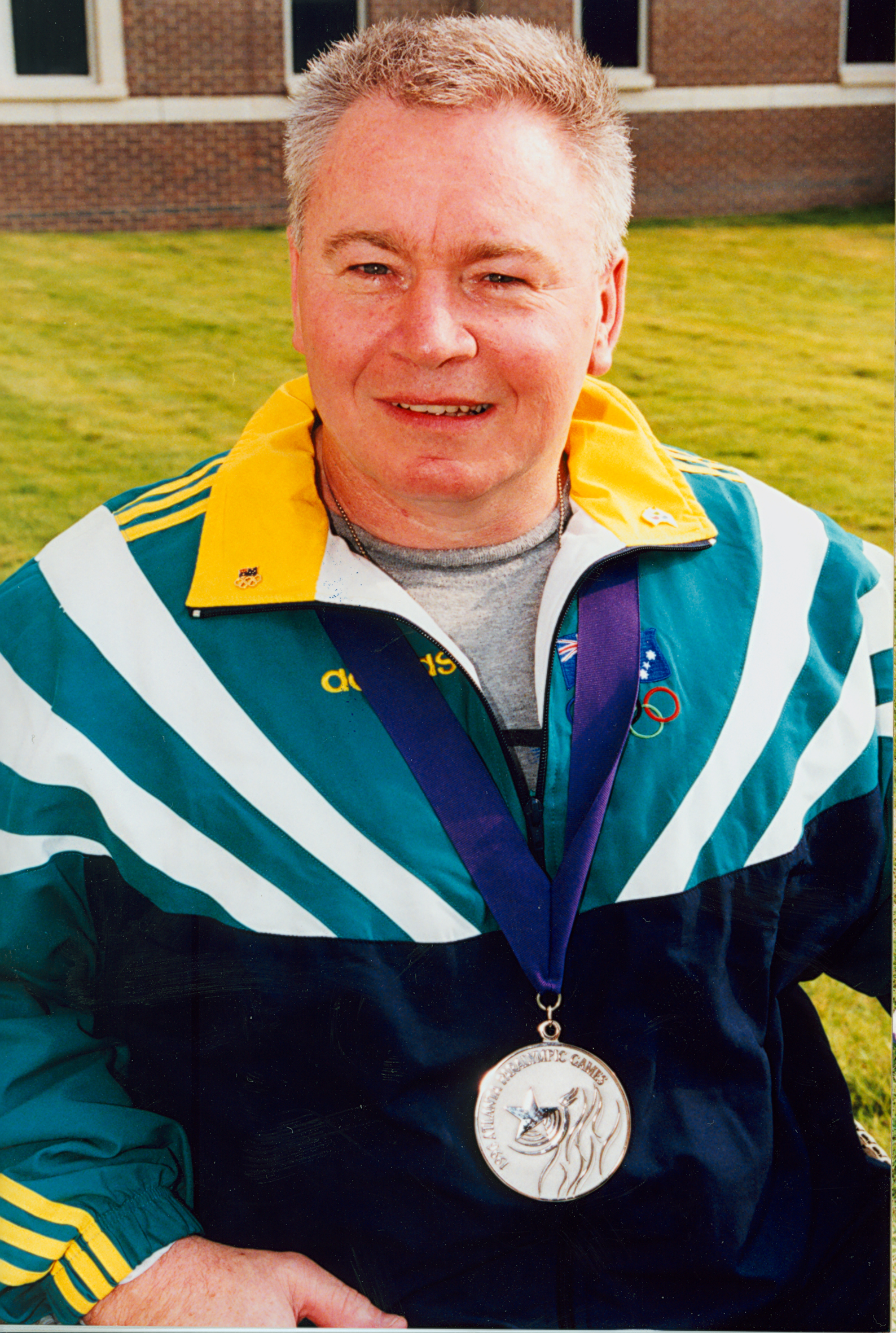
Brian McNicholl, at the Atlanta 1996 Paralympic Games

Notable Australian athletes include:

- Vic Renalson, has won 3 gold medals and 1 silver medal in weightlifting events. He also won 2 gold, 2 silver and 2 bronze medals in athletics events.
- Brian McNicholl, has won 1 gold medal, 1 silver medal and 2 bronze medals in weightlifting and powerlifting events.
- Darren Gardiner, has won 2 silver medals.

== Medal table ==
Games	Gold	Silver	Bronze	Total
1964 Tokyo	0	3	0	3
1968 Tel Aviv	1	0	0	1
1972 Heidelberg	1	0	0	1
1976 Toronto	1	0	1	2
1980 Arnhem	0	0	2	2
1984 Stoke Mandeville	0	0	0	0
1988 Seoul	0	1	2	3
1992 Barcelona	1	0	0	1
1996 Atlanta	0	1	0	1
2000 Sydney*	0	1	0	1
2004 Athens	0	1	0	1
2008 Beijing	0	1	0	1
2012 London	0	0	0	0
2024 Paris	0	0	0	0
Totals (14 entries)	4	8	5	17

== Summer Paralympic Games ==
Australian representatives in weightlifting and powerlifting:

=== 1964 ===
Australia represented by:
Men – Michael Dow, Gary Hooper, Vic Renalson
Australia won three silver medals.

Medal	Name	Event
Silver	Michael Dow	Men's Featherweight
Silver	Gary Hooper	Men's Lightweight
Silver	Vic Renalson	Men's Heavyweight

=== 1968 ===
Australia represented by:
Men – Gary Hooper, Vic Renalson

Medal	Name	Event
Gold	Vic Renalson	Men's Heavyweight

=== 1972 ===
Australia represented by:
Men – Dennis Kay, Terry Mason, Vic Renalson

Medal	Name	Event
Gold	Vic Renalson	Men's heavyweight

=== 1976 ===
Australia represented by:
Men – Terry Mason, Vic Renalson

Medal	Name	Event
Gold	Vic Renalson	Men's middleweight
Bronze	Terry Mason	Men's light featherweight

=== 1980 ===
Australia represented by:
Men – Barry Kalms, Brian McNicholl, John Sheil

Medal	Name	Event
Bronze	Barry Kalms	Men's lightweight −65 kg amputee
Bronze	Brian McNicholl	Men's middleweight −75 kg paraplegic

=== 1984 ===
Australia represented by:
Men – Brian McNicholl
Australia did not win any medals. Brian McNicholl came 4th in his event.

=== 1988 ===
Australia represented in powerlifting by:
Men – Michael Farrell, Matthew Pobje
Australia represented in weightlifting by:
Men – Ray Epstein, Brian McNicholl, Arnie Money, Paul O'Brien, Col Richards

Medal	Name	Event
Silver	Matthew Pobje	Men's 100 kg
Bronze	Michael Farrell	Men's 100 kg
Bronze	Brian McNicholl	Men's 85 kg

=== 1992 ===
Australia represented by:
Men – Ray Epstein, Steve Green, Brian McNicholl

Medal	Name	Event
Gold	Brian McNicholl	Men's 90 kg

=== 1996 ===
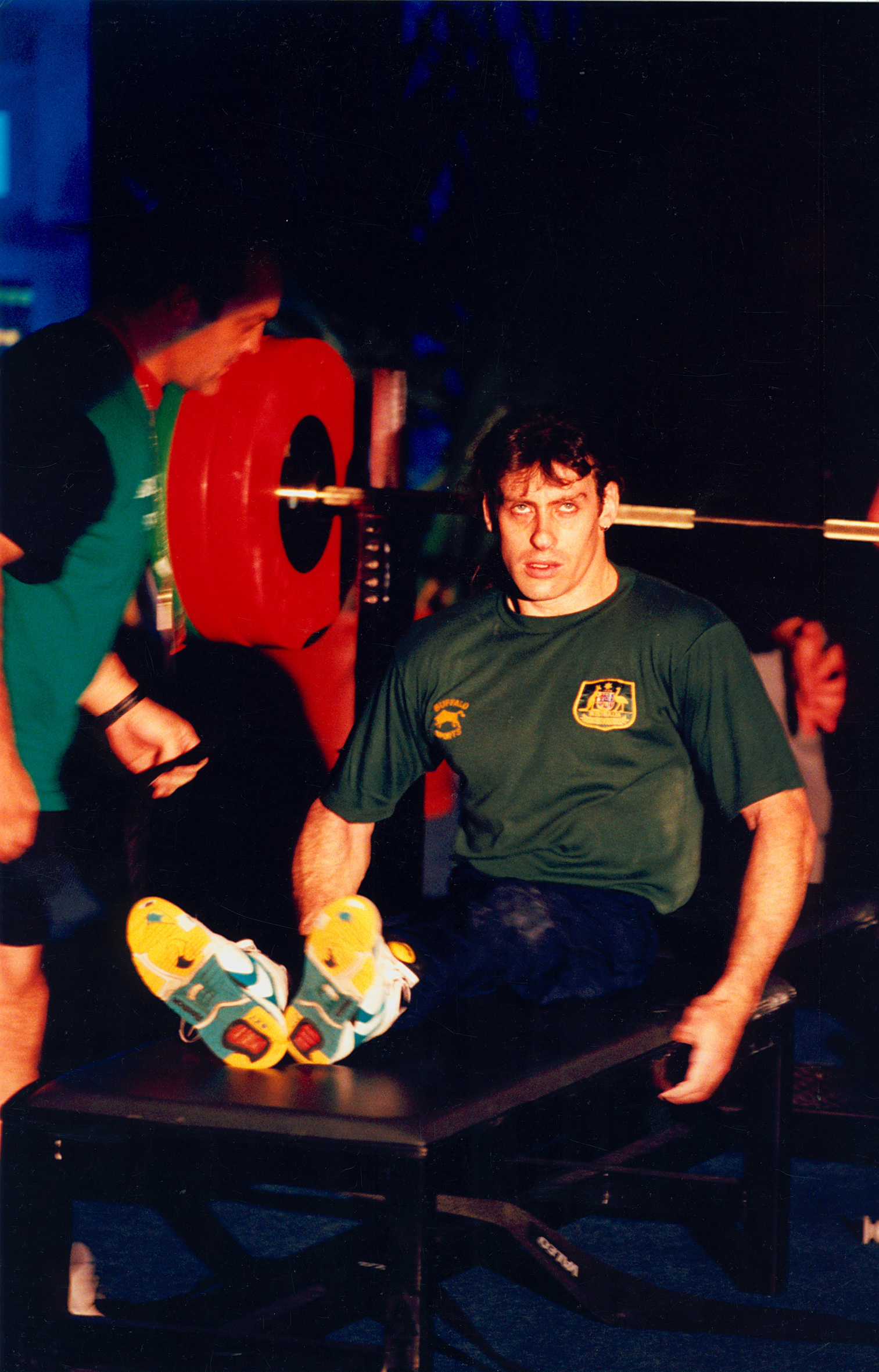
Richard Nicholson at the 1996 Atlanta Paralympic Games

Australia represented in powerlifting by:
Men – Willem Bos, Michael Farrell, Brian McNicholl, Richard Nicholson
Coach – Blagoi Blagoev

Medal	Name	Event
Silver	Brian McNicholl	Men's Up To 90 kg

=== 2000 ===
Australia represented in powerlifting by:

Men – Shaun Cavuoto, Darren Gardiner, Steve Green, Paul Hyde, Richard Nicholson, Kahi Puru, Wayne Sharpe
Women – Deahnne McIntyre, Julie Russell, Vicky Machen, Kim Neuenkirchen, Melissa Trafela, Sue Twelftree
Coaches – Blagoi Blagoev (Head), Ray Epstein

Medal	Name	Event
Silver	Richard Nicholson	Men's 60 kg

=== 2004 ===
Australia represented in powerlifting:
Men – Darren Gardiner, Steve Green, Wayne Sharpe
Women – Deahnne McIntyre
Coaches – Martin Leach (Coach), Michael Farrell

Medal	Name	Event
Silver	Darren Gardiner| Men's +100 kg	

Gardiner originally finished third but was awarded the silver medal after Habibollah Mousavi gold medallist in +100 kg was disqualified after a positive doping test.

=== 2008 ===
Representing Australia in powerlifting:
Men – Darren Gardiner, Abebe Fekadu
Women – Deahnne McIntyre
Coaches – Ray Epstein (Head Coach), Bill Nancarrow

Medal	Name	Event
Silver	Darren Gardiner	Men's 100 +kg

=== 2012 ===
Selected team of 2 athletes.
Men – Darren Gardiner and Abebe Fekadu.
Coaches – Ray Epstein (Head)
Darren Gardiner, a previous Games medallist competed at his fourth Games and Fekadu, a refugee from Ethiopia at his second Games. Australia did not win any medals.

=== 2016 ===
No athletes selected.

=== 2020 ===
No athletes selected.

=== 2024 ===
Selected team of 2 athletes:
Men – Ben Wright (powerlifter)
Women - Hani Watson
Coach – Simon Bergner (Head)

Australia did not win any medals.

== See also ==
- Powerlifting at the Summer Paralympics
- Weightlifting at the Summer Paralympics
- Australia at the Paralympics
