= Iraq at the 2020 Summer Paralympics =

- Flag of Iraq
- IPC code: IRQ
- NPC: Iraqi National Paralympic Committee

in Tokyo, Japan August 24, 2021 – September 5, 2021
- Competitors: 19 in 5 sports
- Medals: Gold 0 Silver 1 Bronze 2 Total 3

Summer Paralympics appearances (overview)
- 1992; 1996; 2000; 2004; 2008; 2012; 2016; 2020; 2024

Iraq competed at the 2020 Summer Paralympics in Tokyo, Japan, from 24 August to 5 September 2021.

== Medalists ==
Medal	Name	Sport	Event	Date
Silver	Garrah Tnaiash	Athletics	Men's shot put F40	29 August
Bronze	Faris Abed	Powerlifting	Men's +107 kg	30 August
Bronze	Wildan Nukhailawi	Athletics	Men's javelin throw F41	4 September

== Competitors ==
Sport	Men	Women	Total
Archery	1	1	2
Athletics	6	1	7
Powerlifting	4	2	6
Table Tennis	0	1	1
Wheelchair Fencing	3	0	3
Total	14	5	19

== Archery ==
Archery at the 2020 Summer Paralympics – Men's individual compound open - SULAIMAN Sulaiman

Archery at the 2020 Summer Paralympics – Women's individual recurve open - AL-SAEDI Zaman

== Athletics ==
Six athletes will be representing Iraq at the 2020 Summer Paralympics including reigning Paralympic champion Garrah Tnaiash in the men's shot put F40.

Number	Athlete	Event	Heats		Final	
Number	Athlete	Event	Result	Rank	Result	Rank
Men's Track
1	Ali Al-Rikabi	Men's 400m T38	53.27	4 Q	50.90	4
Men's Field
2	Kovan Abdulraheem	Men's javelin throw F41	—N/a		37.19	6
3	Wildan Nukhailawi	Men's javelin throw F41	—N/a		41.39	3rd place, bronze medalist(s)
4	Ahmed Naas	Men's javelin throw F41	—N/a		37.51	5
5	Hussein Khafaji	Men's javelin throw F34	—N/a		32.32	6
6	Garrah Tnaiash	Men's shot put F40	—N/a		11.15	2nd place, silver medalist(s)
Women's Track
7	Fatimah Suwaed	Women's 100m T35	15.61	4 Q	15.39	6
8	Fatimah Suwaed	Women's 200m T35	—N/a		32.79	5

== Powerlifting ==
Number	Athlete	Event	Result	Rank
Men
1	Ali Al-Darraji	Men's 54 kg	137	5
2	Rasool Mohsin	Men's 72 kg	NM	-
3	Abbas Naisan	Men's 107 kg	200	7
4	Faris Abed	Men's +107 kg	228	3rd place, bronze medalist(s)
Women
5	Hanan Al-Majidi	Women's 86 kg	NM	-
6	Huda Ali	Women's +86 kg	90	8

== Table tennis ==
Women

Athlete	Event	Group Stage			Quarterfinals	Semifinals	Final	
Athlete	Event	Opposition Result	Opposition Result	Rank	Opposition Result	Opposition Result	Opposition Result	Rank
Najlah Aldayyeni	Individual C6	Alieva (RPC); L 1-3	Lee (KOR); L 1-3	3	did not advance			

== Wheelchair fencing ==
Wheelchair fencing at the 2020 Summer Paralympics – Men's foil A - AL-MADHKHOORI Zainulabdeen

Wheelchair fencing at the 2020 Summer Paralympics – Men's épée A - AL-MADHKHOORI Zainulabdeen

Wheelchair fencing at the 2020 Summer Paralympics – Men's épée B - ALI Ammar

Wheelchair fencing at the 2020 Summer Paralympics – Men's sabre B - ALI Ammar

Wheelchair fencing at the 2020 Summer Paralympics – Men's épée team - AL-MADHKHOORI Zainulabdeen / ALI Ammar / AL-OGAILI Hayder

== See also ==
- Iraq at the Paralympics
- Iraq at the 2020 Summer Olympics
