= Cycling at the 2004 Summer Paralympics – Men's time trial =

Men's 1 km time trial track cycling events at the 2004 Summer Paralympics were held at the Olympic Velodrome between 18 & 22 September.

There were three classes, for Blind & Visually Impaired, Cerebral Palsy and Locomotor Disability competitors.

== B 1-3 ==
Men's 1 km Time Trial Tandem B1-3 at the XII Paralympic Games
- Paralympic Cycling (track)
- Venue: Olympic Velodrome
- Dates: 22 September 2004
- Competitors: 20 from 14 nations

Medalists
1st place, gold medalist(s)		Anthony Biddle; Kial Stewart	Australia
2nd place, silver medalist(s)		Patrice Senmartin; Frederic Janowski	France
3rd place, bronze medalist(s)		Paul Hunter; Ian Sharpe	Great Britain

The B1-3 event was won by Anthony Biddle and his sighted pilot Kial Stewart, representing Australia.

=== Results ===
22 Sept. 2004, 10:50

Rank	Athlete	Time	Notes
1st place, gold medalist(s)	Anthony Biddle (AUS); Kial Stewart (AUS)	1:05.14	
2nd place, silver medalist(s)	Patrice Senmartin (FRA); Frederic Janowski (FRA)	1:05.40	
3rd place, bronze medalist(s)	Paul Hunter (GBR); Ian Sharpe (GBR)	1:05.53	
4	Tatsuyuki Oshiro (JPN); Hideki Tanzawa (JPN)	1:05.91	
5	Daniel Adam Gordon (GBR); Barney Storey (GBR)	1:06.64	
6	Takuya Oki (JPN); Shigeo Yoshihara (JPN)	1:06.93	
7	Kieran Modra (AUS); David Short (AUS)	1:06.94	
8	Matthew King (USA); Eric Degolier (USA)	1:07.56	
9	Beat Howald (SUI); Raphael Ioset (SUI)	1:07.60	
10	Stephane Cote (CAN); Pierreolivier Boily (CAN)	1:07.82	
11	Torsten Goliasch (GER); Achim Moll (GER)	1:07.82	
12	Brian Cowie (CAN); Murray Solem (CAN)	1:07.00	
13	Vladislav Janovjak (SVK); Juraj Petrovic (SVK)	1:08.90	
14	Juan Suarez (ESP); Francisco Gonzalez (ESP)	1:08.51	
15	Miguel Angel Clemente (ESP); Ignacio Soler (ESP)	1:08.45	
16	Fabrizio Di Somma (ITA); Emanuele Bersini (ITA)	1:10.91	
17	Krzysztof Kosikowski (POL); Lukasz Tunkiewicz (POL)	1:10.99	
18	Mark Kehoe (IRL); Ian Mahon (IRL)	1:14.38	
19	Christos Kalimeris (GRE); Symeon Triommatis (GRE)	1:16.71	
	Jason Bryn (USA); Glenn Bunselmeyer (USA)	DNS	

== CP 3/4 ==
Men's 1 km Time Trial CP Div 3/4 at the XII Paralympic Games
- Paralympic Cycling (track)
- Venue: Olympic Velodrome
- Dates: 18 September 2004
- Competitors: 17 from 11 nations

Medalists
1st place, gold medalist(s)		Darren Kenny	Great Britain
2nd place, silver medalist(s)		Andrew Panazzolo	Australia
3rd place, bronze medalist(s)		Jiri Bouska	Czech Republic

The CP Div 3/4 event at the 2004 Summer Paralympics was won by Darren Kenny, representing Great Britain. Standings were decided by calculated times.

=== Results ===
18 Sept. 2004, 15:20

Rank	Athlete	Real Time	Factor	Time	Notes
1st place, gold medalist(s)	Darren Kenny (GBR)	1:14.47	91.573	1:08.20	WR
2nd place, silver medalist(s)	Andrew Panazzolo (AUS)	1:16.69	91.573	1:10.22	
3rd place, bronze medalist(s)	Jiri Bouska (CZE)	1:11.35	100.000	1:11.35	WR
4	Christopher Scott (AUS)	1:11.67	100.000	1:11.67	
5	Javier Otxoa (ESP)	1:20.03	91.573	1:13.28	
6	Daniel Nicholson (USA)	1:20.30	91.573	1:13.53	
7	Lubos Jirka (CZE)	1:15.62	100.000	1:15.62	
8	Stephan Herholdt (RSA)	1:15.71	100.000	1:15.71	
9	Rodrigo Lopez (ARG)	1:23.29	91.573	1:16.27	
10	Jean Quevillon (CAN)	1:23.85	91.573	1:16.78	
11	Janos Plekker (RSA)	1:16.98	100.000	1:16.98	
12	Albert Michini (USA)	1:18.71	100.000	1:18.71	
13	Michel Alcaine (FRA)	1:18.99	100.000	1:18.99	
14	Maurice Eckhard (ESP)	1:26.37	91.573	1:19.09	
15	Petr Plihal (CZE)	1:20.38	100.000	1:20.38	
16	Klaus Lungershausen (GER)	1:20.51	100.000	1:20.51	
17	Michael Kurz (AUT)	1:22.42	100.000	1:22.42	

== LC 1-4 ==
Men's 1 km Time Trial LC1-4 at the XII Paralympic Games
- Paralympic Cycling (track)
- Venue: Olympic Velodrome
- Dates: 20 September 2004
- Competitors: 38 from 18 nations

Medalists
1st place, gold medalist(s)		Greg Ball	Australia
2nd place, silver medalist(s)		Laurent Thirionet	France
3rd place, bronze medalist(s)		Tobias Graf	Germany

The LC1-4 event at the 2004 Summer Paralympics was won by Greg Ball, representing Australia. Standings were decided by calculated times.

=== Results ===
20 Sept. 2004, 15:20

Rank	Athlete	Real Time	Factor	Time	Notes
1st place, gold medalist(s)	Greg Ball (AUS)	1:21.77	82.763	1:07.67	WR
2nd place, silver medalist(s)	Laurent Thirionet (FRA)	1:19.29	86.966	1:08.96	WR
3rd place, bronze medalist(s)	Tobias Graf (GER)	1:19.75	86.966	1:09.36	
4	Michael Teuber (GER)	1:24.16	82.763	1:09.65	
5	Peter Brooks (AUS)	1:10.25	100.000	1:10.25	
6	Fabrizio Macchi (ITA)	1:20.98	86.966	1:10.43	
7	Wolfgang Eibeck (AUT)	1:10.74	100.000	1:10.74	
8	Antonio Garcia (ESP)	1:21.42	86.966	1:10.80	
9	Jirí Ježek (CZE)	1:12.08	98.986	1:11.35	
10	Victor Marquez (VEN)	1:22.70	86.966	1:11.92	
11	Bradley Cobb (USA)	1:22.88	86.966	1:12.08	
12	Fabio Triboli (ITA)	1:12.67	100.000	1:12.67	
13	Amador Granado (ESP)	1:13.63	98.986	1:12.88	
14	Michal Stark (CZE)	1:23.88	86.966	1:12.94	
15	Walter Marquardt (GER)	1:13.06	100.000	1:13.06	
16	Ivan Renggli (SUI)	1:13.28	100.000	1:13.28	
17	Paul Martin (USA)	1:14.15	98.986	1:13.40	
18	Robinson Martinez (COL)	1:24.99	86.966	1:13.91	
19	Guenter Schambeck (GER)	1:14.36	100.000	1:14.36	
20	Juanjo Mendez (ESP)	1:30.01	82.763	1:14.49	
21	Hans Peter Beier (GER)	1:30.81	82.763	1:15.16	
22	David Mercier (FRA)	1:15.29	100.000	1:15.29	
23	Roman Marcek (SVK)	1:16.02	100.000	1:16.02	
24	Pierangelo Vignati (ITA)	1:16.22	100.000	1:16.22	
25	Sebastien Serriere (FRA)	1:17.53	98.986	1:16.74	
26	Akio Sakuma (JPN)	1:16.92	100.000	1:16.92	
27	Erich Winkler (GER)	1:33.05	82.763	1:17.01	
28	Marc Breton (CAN)	1:18.21	100.000	1:18.21	
29	David Kuster (SLO)	1:19.03	98.986	1:18.23	
30	Wolfgang Dabernig (AUT)	1:34.93	82.763	1:18.57	
31	Alfred Kaiblinger (AUT)	1:19.56	98.986	1:18.75	
32	Bruce Penner (CAN)	1:36.73	82.763	1:20.06	
33	Mahmood Meili (IRI)	1:33.73	86.966	1:21.51	
34	Loukas Anestis (GRE)	1:22.32	100.000	1:22.35	
35	Panagiotis Paterakis (GRE)	1:26.88	98.986	1:26.00	
	Paul Jesson (NZL)	DNS			
	Patrick Ceria (FRA)	DNS			
	Beat Schwarzenbach (SUI)	DNS			
