= Iraq at the 2024 Summer Paralympics =

- IPC code: IRQ
- NPC: Iraqi National Paralympic Committee

in Paris, France August 28, 2024 – September 8, 2024
- Competitors: 20 in 10 sports
- Flag bearers: Faris Al-Ageeli; Fatimah Suwaed
- Medals Ranked 58th: Gold 1 Silver 1 Bronze 3 Total 5

Summer Paralympics appearances (overview)
- 1992; 1996; 2000; 2004; 2008; 2012; 2016; 2020; 2024

Iraq competed at the 2024 Summer Paralympics in Paris, France, from 28 August to 8 September, 2024.

== Medalists ==
Medal	Name	Sport	Event	Date
Gold	Najlah Al-Dayyeni	Table tennis	Women's class 6	7 September
Silver	Zainulabdeen Al-Madhkhoori; Ammar Ali; Hayder Al-Ogaili	Wheelchair fencing	Men's épée team	7 September 2024
Bronze	Garrah Tnaiash	Athletics	Men's shot put F40	1 September
Bronze	Rasool Mohsin	Powerlifting	Men's 80 kg	6 September
Bronze	Wildan Nukhailawi	Athletics	Men's javelin throw F41	7 September

=== Medals by sport ===
Medals by sport
Sport	1st place, gold medalist(s)	2nd place, silver medalist(s)	3rd place, bronze medalist(s)	Total
Table tennis	1	0	0	1
Wheelchair fencing	0	1	0	1
Athletics	0	0	2	2
Powerlifting	0	0	1	1
Total	1	1	3	5

=== Medals by gender ===
Medals by gender
Gender	1st place, gold medalist(s)	2nd place, silver medalist(s)	3rd place, bronze medalist(s)	Total
Female	1	0	0	1
Male	0	1	3	4
Mixed	0	0	0	0
Total	1	1	3	5

=== Medals by date ===
Medals by date
Date	1st place, gold medalist(s)	2nd place, silver medalist(s)	3rd place, bronze medalist(s)	Total
1 September	0	0	1	1
6 September	0	0	1	1
7 September	1	1	1	3
Total	1	1	3	5

== Competitors ==
The following is the list of number of competitors in the Games.

Sport	Men	Women	Total
Archery	1	1	2
Athletics	5	1	6
Judo	1	0	1
Powerlifting	3	0	3
Shooting	0	1	1
Swimming	1	0	1
Table tennis	0	1	1
Taekwondo	1	0	1
Wheelchair fencing	3	0	3
Wheelchair tennis	1	0	1
Total	16	4	20

== Archery ==
Iraq entered two athletes into the games by virtue of his result at the 2023 World Para Archery Championships in Plzeň, Czech Republic.

Athlete	Event	Ranking Round		Round of 32	Round of 16	Quarterfinals	Semifinals	Finals	
Athlete	Event	Score	Seed	Opposition Score	Opposition Score	Opposition Score	Opposition Score	Opposition Score	Rank
Abbas Kadhim	Men's individual compound	694	9	Joussaume (FRA); W 141-140	van Montagu (BEL); L 141-143	Did not advance			
Sarah Al-hameed	Women's individual compound	669	16	Ferelly (INA); L 127-129	Did not advance				
Abbas Kadhim; Sarah Al-hameed	Mixed team compound			—N/a	Indonesia; L 149-150	Did not advance			

== Athletics ==
Iraqi track and field athletes achieved quota places for the following events based on their results at the 2023 World Championships, 2024 World Championships, or through high performance allocation, as long as they meet the minimum entry standard (MES).

Key

- Note–Ranks given for track events are within the athlete's heat only
- Q = Qualified for the next round
- q = Qualified for the next round as a fastest loser or, in field events, by position without achieving the qualifying target
- DQ = Disqualified
- PR = Paralympic Record
- AR = Area (or continental) Record
- NR = National Record
- SB = Season's Best
- N/A = Round not applicable for the event
- Bye = Athlete not required to compete in round

Track & road events

Athlete	Event	Heat		Semifinals		Final	
Athlete	Event	Result	Rank	Result	Rank	Result	Rank
Ali Al-Rikabi	Men's 100 m T38	—N/a		—N/a		11.48	8
Ali Al-Rikabi	Men's 400 m T38	—N/a		—N/a		50.34	4
Mohammed Ayade	Men's 400 m T11	51.98	2 Q	52.04	2 Q	51.25	4
Fatimah Suwaed	Women's 100 m T35	—N/a		—N/a		14.82	4
Fatimah Suwaed	Women's 200 m T35	—N/a		—N/a		31.06	4

Field events

Athlete	Event	Qualification		Final	
Athlete	Event	Distance	Position	Distance	Position
Garrah Tnaiash	Men's shot put F40	—N/a		11.03	3rd place, bronze medalist(s)
Hussein Khafaji	Men's javelin throw F34	—N/a		34.53	5
Wildan Nukhailawi	Men's javelin throw F41	—N/a		40.46	3rd place, bronze medalist(s)

== Judo ==
Athlete	Event	Round of 16	Quarterfinals	Semifinals	Repechage round 1	Repechage round 2	Final / BM	
Athlete	Event	Opposition Result	Opposition Result	Opposition Result	Opposition Result	Opposition Result	Opposition Result	Rank
Taha Al-Gburi	90 kg	Jonard (FRA); L 0-10	Did not advance		Cretul (MDA); L 0-10	Did not advance		9

== Powerlifting ==
Number	Athlete	Event span="3" |Attempt (kg)	Result (kg)	Rank			
Number	Athlete	Event span="3" |Attempt (kg)	Result (kg)	Rank	1	2	3
1	Muslim Al-Sudani	Men's 54 kg	178	~~182~~	~~182~~	178	4
2	Rasool Mohsin	Men's 80 kg	215	~~223~~	~~226~~	215	3rd place, bronze medalist(s)

== Shooting ==
Women

Athlete	Event	Qualification		Final	
Athlete	Event	Score	Rank	Score	Rank
Shahad Al-Luhaibi	10m air pistol SH1	549	11	did not advance	

== Swimming ==
Men

Athletes	Event	Heat		Final	
Athletes	Event	Time	Rank	Time	Rank
Qasim Al-Khafaji	50m butterfly S6	DSQ	DSQ	did not advance	
Qasim Al-Khafaji	100 metre freestyle S6				

== Table tennis ==
Iraq secure one singles spot for the Paralympic games. Najlah Al-Dayyeni qualified for Paris 2024 by virtue of her gold medal results, in class 6, at the 2022 Asian Para Games in Hangzhou.

Athlete	Event	Group Stage				Quarterfinals	Semifinals	Final / BM	
Athlete	Event	Opposition Result	Opposition Result	Opposition Result	Rank	Opposition Result	Opposition Result	Opposition Result	Rank
Najlah Al-Dayyeni	Women's individual C6	—N/a				Caillaud (FRA); W 3-0	Alieva (NPA); W 3-1	Lytovchenko (UKR); W 3-1	1st place, gold medalist(s)

== Taekwondo ==
Athlete	Event	First round	Quarterfinals	Semifinals	Repechage 1	Repechage 2	Final / BM	
Athlete	Event	Opposition Result	Opposition Result	Opposition Result	Opposition Result	Opposition Result	Opposition Result	Rank
Ahmed Shekha	Men's +80 kg	Omirali (KAZ); L TKO-11	did not advance					

== Wheelchair fencing ==
Athlete	Event	Round of 32	Round of 16	Quarterfinal	Semifinal	Repechage 1	Repechage 2	Repechage 3	Repechage 4	Final / BM	
Athlete	Event	Opposition Score	Opposition Score	Opposition Score	Opposition Score	Opposition Score	Opposition Score	Opposition Score	Opposition Score	Opposition Score	Rank
Zainulabdeen Al-Madhkhoori	Men's foil A	—N/a	Tokatlian (FRA); L 4-15	Did not advance		Pender (POL); L 2-15	Did not advance				13
Zainulabdeen Al-Madhkhoori	Men's épée A	—N/a	Lam-Watson (GBR); L 14-15	Did not advance		Demchuk (UKR); W 15-14	Tian (CHN); L 10-15	Did not advance			10
Hayder Al-Ogaili	Men's foil A	Damasceno (BRA); L 12-15	Did not advance								17
Hayder Al-Ogaili	Men's épée A	—N/a	Tian (CHN); L 12-15	Did not advance		Schoonover (USA); W 15-6	Lam-Watson (GBR); L 12-15	Did not advance			11
Ammar Ali	Men's épée B	—N/a	Naumenko (UKR); W 15-8	Kingmanaw (THA); L 13-15	Did not advance	—N/a	Datsko (UKR); L 14-15	Did not advance			10
Ammar Ali	Men's foil B	—N/a	Daoliang (CHN); L 4-15	Did not advance			Massa (ITA); L 3-15	Did not advance			10
Hayder Al-Ogaili; Zainulabdeen Al-Madhkhoori; Ammar Ali	Team foil	Indonesia; L DNS-0	DNS	Did not advance							
Hayder Al-Ogaili; Zainulabdeen Al-Madhkhoori; Ammar Ali	Team épée	—N/a	—N/a	Brazil; W 45-14	Great Britain; W 45-39	—N/a	—N/a	—N/a	—N/a	China; L 36-45	2nd place, silver medalist(s)

== Wheelchair tennis ==
Athlete	Event	Round of 64	Round of 32	Round of 16	Quarterfinals	Semifinals	Final / BM	
Athlete	Event	Opposition Result	Opposition Result	Opposition Result	Opposition Result	Opposition Result	Opposition Result	Rank
Hussein Hamid Habal	Men's singles		did not advance					

== See also ==
- Iraq at the 2024 Summer Olympics
- Iraq at the Paralympics
