= Cycling at the 2004 Summer Paralympics – Men's sprint =

Men's Sprint Tandem B1-3 at the XII Paralympic Games
- Paralympic Cycling
- Venue: Olympic Velodrome
- Dates: 19–21 September 2004
- Competitors: 13 from 12 nations

Medalists
1st place, gold medalist(s)		Kieran Modra; David Short	Australia
2nd place, silver medalist(s)		Shigeo Yoshihara; Takuya Oki	Japan
3rd place, bronze medalist(s)		Anthony Biddle; Kial Stewart	Australia

The Men's Sprint Tandem B1-3 cycling competition at the 2004 Summer Paralympics was held in the Olympic Velodrome from 19–21 September at the Olympic Velodrome.

The event was won by Kieran Modra and his sighted pilot David Short, representing Australia. Second on the day were Vladislav Janovjak and Juraj Petrovic of Slovakia, but they were disqualified and their silver medals forfeited after Petrovic tested positive for the banned glucocorticosteroid, methylprednisolone. This was the first time in the Paralympic Games that a guide or pilot returned a positive sample in an anti-doping test.

== Results ==
=== Ranking Round ===
Qualified for final round

Rank	Competitor	Points	Notes
1	Kieran Modra (AUS); David Short (AUS)	10.771	WR
2	Anthony Biddle (AUS); Kial Stewart (AUS)	10.800	
3	Vladislav Janovjak (SVK); Juraj Petrovic (SVK)	10.958	
4	Barney Storey (GBR); Daniel Adam Gordon (GBR)	10.991	
5	Shigeo Yoshihara (JPN); Takuya Oki (JPN)	10.997	
6	Achim Moll (GER); Torsten Goliasch (GER)	11.108	
7	Frederic Janowski (FRA); Patrice Senmartin (FRA)	11.113	
8	Tatsuyuki Oshiro (JPN); Hideki Tanzawa (JPN)	11.237	
9	Matthew King (USA); Eric Degolier (USA)	11.461	
10	Lukasz Tunkiewicz (POL); Krzysztof Kosikowski (POL)	11.484	
11	Brian Cowie (CAN); Murray Solem (CAN)	11.521	
12	Christos Kalimeris (GRE); Symeon Triommatis (GRE)	12.730	
	Raphael Ioset (SUI); Beat Howald (SUI)	DNS	

=== Final Round ===
Quarterfinals
Kieran Modra (AUS); David Short (AUS)	11.216	11.373
Tatsuyuki Oshiro (JPN); Hideki Tanzawa (JPN)
Shigeo Yoshihara (JPN); Takuya Oki (JPN)
Barney Storey (GBR); Daniel Adam Gordon (GBR)	------	DNF	------
Vladislav Janovjak (SVK); Juraj Petrovic (SVK)	11.319	11.326
Achim Moll (GER); Torsten Goliasch (GER)
Anthony Biddle (AUS); Kial Stewart (AUS)	11.378	11.160
Frederic Janowski (FRA); Patrice Senmartin (FRA)

Semifinals
Kieran Modra (AUS); David Short (AUS)	11.350	11.214
Shigeo Yoshihara (JPN); Takuya Oki (JPN)
Vladislav Janovjak (SVK); Juraj Petrovic (SVK)	11.247	11.557
Anthony Biddle (AUS); Kial Stewart (AUS)	11.177

Finals
Kieran Modra (AUS); David Short (AUS)
Vladislav Janovjak (SVK); Juraj Petrovic (SVK)	------	DSQ	------
Third place
Shigeo Yoshihara (JPN); Takuya Oki (JPN)	11.066	11.385
Anthony Biddle (AUS); Kial Stewart (AUS)	11.342

=== 5-8 Place Matches ===
Rank	Name	Time
5	Achim Moll (GER); Torsten Goliasch (GER)	12.047
6	Barney Storey (GBR); Daniel Adam Gordon (GBR)	

Rank	Name	Time
7	Shigeo Yoshihara (JPN); Takuya Oki (JPN)	11.826
8	Frederic Janowski (FRA); Patrice Senmartin (FRA)	
