= Iraq at the 2008 Summer Paralympics =

- IPC code: IRQ
- NPC: Iraqi National Paralympic Committee

in Beijing
- Competitors: 19 in 3 sports
- Flag bearer: Faris Al-Ajeeli
- Medals Ranked 60th: Gold 0 Silver 1 Bronze 1 Total 2

Summer Paralympics appearances (overview)
- 1992; 1996; 2000; 2004; 2008; 2012; 2016; 2020; 2024

Iraq sent a delegation to compete at the 2008 Summer Paralympics in Beijing. Twenty Iraqis qualified to compete in the Games, in fields including powerlifting, athletics, and volleyball.

== Medalists ==
The country won two medals, a silver and a bronze.

Medal	Name	Sport	Event	Date
Silver	Rasool Mohsin	Powerlifting	Men's -56 kg	11 September
Bronze	Thaer al-Ali	Powerlifting	Men's -82.50 kg	15 September

== Sports ==
=== Athletics ===
Athlete	Class	Event	Heats		Semifinal		Final	
Athlete	Class	Event	Result	Rank	Result	Rank	Result	Rank
Alaa Jasim Al-Qaysi	T12	Women's 100m	13.12	9 q	13.03	9	did not advance	
Alaa Jasim Al-Qaysi	T12	Women's 200m	DNS		did not advance			
Alaa Jasim Al-Qaysi	F12	Women's long jump	—				5.01	10

=== Powerlifting ===
==== Men ====
Athlete	Event	Result	Rank
Thaer Al-Ali	82.5kg	222.5	3rd place, bronze medalist(s)
Hasan Al-Temeemi	60kg	152.5	9
Hussein Juboori	52kg	165.0	4
Mohammed Mohammed	67.5kg	175.0	9
Rasool Mohsin	56kg	185.0	2nd place, silver medalist(s)

==== Women ====
Athlete	Event	Result	Rank
Dhikra Saleem	56kg	90.0	5

=== Volleyball ===
The men's volleyball team didn't win any medals; they were 7th out of 8 teams.

==== Players ====
- Saeed Al Mimar
- Salah Al Shammari
- Hussain Al Ugbi
- Naser Alaibi
- Ahmed Dahash
- Muayad Hattab
- Hadi Juboori
- Majeed Kaabi
- Mahdi Khayoon
- Majeed Majeed
- Abdulmunem Mohmmed
- Ahmed Whailani

==== Tournament ====
8 September 2008; 19:30	Iraq (IRQ)	0–3	Bosnia and Herzegovina (BIH)	China Agricultural University Gymnasium; Attendance: 500; Referees: Jung Mal Soon (South Korea)
8 September 2008; 19:30	(6–25, 14–25, 16–25)			China Agricultural University Gymnasium; Attendance: 500; Referees: Jung Mal Soon (South Korea)

9 September 2008; 15:30	Russia (RUS)	3-0	Iraq (IRQ)	China Agricultural University Gymnasium; Attendance: 1,300; Referees: Joseph Campbell (United States)
9 September 2008; 15:30	(25–13, 25–8, 25–15)			China Agricultural University Gymnasium; Attendance: 1,300; Referees: Joseph Campbell (United States)

10 September 2008; 19:30	Iraq (IRQ)	0–3	China (CHN)	China Agricultural University Gymnasium; Attendance: 4,000; Referees: Ronaldo Tadeu Chaves (Brazil)
10 September 2008; 19:30	(9–25, 17–25, 12–25)			China Agricultural University Gymnasium; Attendance: 4,000; Referees: Ronaldo Tadeu Chaves (Brazil)

5th-8th classification

13 September 2008	Brazil (BRA)	3-1	Iraq (IRQ)	China Agricultural University Gymnasium
13 September 2008	(25–13, 20–25, 25–16, 25–18)			China Agricultural University Gymnasium

7th-8th classification

14 September 2008	Iraq (IRQ)	3-0	Japan (JPN)	China Agricultural University Gymnasium
14 September 2008	(25–15, 25–15, 25–14)			China Agricultural University Gymnasium

== See also ==
- 2008 Summer Paralympics
- Iraq at the Paralympics
- Iraq at the 2008 Summer Olympics
