= Iraq at the 2012 Summer Paralympics =

- IPC code: IRQ
- NPC: Iraqi National Paralympic Committee

in London
- Competitors: 19 in 7 sports
- Medals Ranked 59th: Gold 0 Silver 2 Bronze 1 Total 3

Summer Paralympics appearances (overview)
- 1992; 1996; 2000; 2004; 2008; 2012; 2016; 2020; 2024

Iraq competed at the 2012 Summer Paralympics in London, United Kingdom from August 29 to September 9, 2012.

== Medallists ==
Medal	Name	Sport	Event	Date
Silver	Faris Al-Ajeeli	Powerlifting	Men's +100kg	5 September
Silver	Ahmed Naas	Athletics	Men's Javelin Throw F40	7 September
Bronze	Wildan Nukhailawi	Athletics	Men's Javelin Throw F40	7 September

== Athletics ==
Men's Track and Road Events

Athlete	Event	Heat		Semifinal		Final	
Athlete	Event	Result	Rank	Result	Rank	Result	Rank
Ahmed Kadhim	100m T12	11.77	3	—		did not advance	
Ahmed Kadhim	200m T12	23.16	3	did not advance			
Hussein Kadhim	200m T13	23.06	4	—		did not advance	
Hussein Kadhim	400m T13	50.36	1 Q	—		49.76	5

Men's Field Events

Athlete	Event	Distance	Points	Rank
Hasan Janabi	Long Jump F36	4.40	—	9
Mahdi Al-Saadi	Shot Put F11-12	11.12	719	13
Hameed Hassain	Shot Put F11-12	9.81	698	16
Hameed Hassain	Discus Throw F11	26.65	—	10
Kovan Abdulraheem	Shot Put F40	10.60	—	8
Kovan Abdulraheem	Discus Throw F40	27.28	—	12
Kovan Abdulraheem	Javelin Throw F40	41.72	—	4
Wildan Nukhailawi	Shot Put F40	10.46	—	9
Wildan Nukhailawi	Discus Throw F40	28.24	—	11
Wildan Nukhailawi	Javelin Throw F40	42.31	—	3rd place, bronze medalist(s)
Ahmed Naas	Javelin Throw F40	43.27	—	2nd place, silver medalist(s)

== Powerlifting ==
Men

Athlete	Event	Result	Rank
Hussein Juboori	-52kg	160.0	6
Hasan Al-Tameemi	-56kg	NMR	
Jabbar Jaber	-90kg	195.0	5
Faris Al-Ajeeli	+100kg	242	2nd place, silver medalist(s)

Women

Athlete	Event	Result	Rank
Dhikra Saleem	-60kg	101.0	5
Huda Ali	-82.5kg	108.0	7

== Shooting ==
Women

Athlete	Event	Qualification		Final	
Athlete	Event	Score	Rank	Score	Rank
Farah Al-Waeli	10m Air Rifle Standing SH1	373	18	did not advance	

== Swimming ==
Men

Athletes	Event	Heat		Final	
Athletes	Event	Time	Rank	Time	Rank
Jawad Joudah	100m backstroke S6	1:24.59	7 Q	1:25.31	7
Jawad Joudah	100m breaststroke SB5	DSQ		did not advance	
Jawad Joudah	200m individual medley SM6	3:25.70	16	did not advance	

== Table tennis ==
Men

Athlete	Event	Group Stage			Quarterfinals	Semifinals	Final	
Athlete	Event	Opposition Result	Opposition Result	Rank	Opposition Result	Opposition Result	Opposition Result	Rank
Saeed Ali	Individual C8	Csejtey (SVK); L 0-3	Grudzien (POL); W 3-0	2	did not advance			

== Wheelchair Fencing ==
Men

Athlete	Event	Group Stage			Round of 16	Quarterfinals	Semifinals	Final	
Athlete	Event	Opposition Result	Opposition Result	Rank	Opposition Result	Opposition Result	Opposition Result	Opposition Result	Rank
Ammar Ali	Individual épée B	Tam (HKG); L 4-5	Palavecino (ARG); W 5-0	3 Q	Bye	Latreche (FRA); L 6-15	did not advance		
Ammar Ali	Individual épée B	Latreche (FRA); W 5-2	Estep (USA); W 5-3	3 Q	Bye	Latreche (FRA); L 6-15	did not advance		

== Wheelchair Tennis ==
Athlete	Event	Round of 64	Round of 32	Round of 16	Quarterfinals	Semifinals	Final	
Athlete	Event	Opposition Result	Opposition Result	Opposition Result	Opposition Result	Opposition Result	Opposition Result	Rank
Mohammed Hamdan	Men's Singles	Maripa (RSA); L 1–6, 0-6	did not advance					

== See also ==
- Iraq at the 2012 Summer Olympics
