= Powerlifting at the 2004 Summer Paralympics – Men's +100 kg =

Men's Over 100 kg at the XII Paralympic Games
- Paralympic Powerlifting
- Venue: Nikaia Olympic Weightlifting Hall
- Dates: 27 September 2004
- Competitors: 13 from 13 nations
- Winning weight(kg): 237.5

Medalists
1st place, gold medalist(s)		Faris Abed	Iraq
2nd place, silver medalist(s)		Darren Gardiner	Australia
3rd place, bronze medalist(s)		Csaba Szavai	Hungary

The Men's +100 kg powerlifting event at the 2004 Summer Paralympics was competed on 27 September. It was won by Faris Abed, representing Iraq.

== Final round ==
27 Sept. 2004, 17:15

Rank	Athlete	Weight(kg)	Notes
1st place, gold medalist(s)	Faris Abed (IRQ)	237.5	
2nd place, silver medalist(s)	Darren Gardiner (AUS)	225.0	
3rd place, bronze medalist(s)	Csaba Szavai (HUN)	210.0	
4	Kim Brownfield (USA)	205.0	
5	Vladimir Buben (BLR)	200.0	
6	Leszek Hallmann (POL)	200.0	
7	Ali Mohamed (QAT)	190.0	
8	Victor Jose Meza Martinez (VEN)	177.5	
9	Adrian Sandu (ROM)	175.0	
10	Mustafa Yuseinov (BUL)	155.0	
11	Husain Ali Mahdi (BRN)	155.0	
	Seyed Habibollah Mousavi (IRI)	DSQ	
	George Taamaru (NZL)	NMR	
