= Powerlifting at the 2004 Summer Paralympics – Men's 82.5 kg =

Men's Up To 82.5 kg at the XII Paralympic Games
- Paralympic Powerlifting
- Venue: Nikaia Olympic Weightlifting Hall
- Dates: 26 September 2004
- Competitors: 18 from 18 nations
- Winning weight(kg): 217.5

Medalists
1st place, gold medalist(s)		Mohammed Khamis Khalaf	United Arab Emirates
2nd place, silver medalist(s)		Mostafa Hamed	Egypt
3rd place, bronze medalist(s)		Thaair Hussin	Iraq

The Men's 82.5 kg powerlifting event at the 2004 Summer Paralympics was competed on 26 September. It was won by Mohammed Khamis Khalaf, representing United Arab Emirates.

== Final round ==
26 Sept. 2004, 13:45

Rank	Athlete	Weight(kg)	Notes
1st place, gold medalist(s)	Mohammed Khamis Khalaf (UAE)	217.5	
2nd place, silver medalist(s)	Mostafa Hamed (EGY)	212.5	
3rd place, bronze medalist(s)	Thaair Hussin (IRQ)	202.5	
4	Kenneth Doyle (CAN)	197.5	
5	Said Kalakh (MAR)	195.0	
6	Park Kwang Hyuk (KOR)	190.0	
7	Dimitrios Anatolitis (GRE)	190.0	
8	Damian Kulig (POL)	190.0	
9	Qi Dong (CHN)	190.0	
10	Mutaz Al Juneidi (JOR)	185.0	
11	Andriy Barybin (UKR)	180.0	
12	Joao Euzebio Batista (BRA)	165.0	
13	Shawkat Mugalimov (KGZ)	155.0	
14	Fouad Tarverdiyev (AZE)	145.0	
15	Ruben Soroseb (NAM)	145.0	
16	Paulo Cesar Tavares (CPV)	120.0	
	Francisco Ramirez (MEX)	NMR	
	Saeid Bafandeh Sedaghati (IRI)	NMR	
