= Powerlifting at the 2020 Summer Paralympics – Men's +107 kg =

Powerlifting – Men's +107 kg at the XVI Paralympic Games
- Venue: Tokyo International Forum
- Date: 30 August 2021
- Competitors: 8 from 8 nations

Medalists
1st place, gold medalist(s)		Jamil Elshebli	Jordan
2nd place, silver medalist(s)		Mansour Pourmirzaei	Iran
3rd place, bronze medalist(s)		Faris Al-Ageeli	Iraq

The men's +107 kg powerlifting event at the 2020 Summer Paralympics was contested on 30 August 2021 at Tokyo International Forum.

== Records ==
There are twenty powerlifting events, corresponding to ten weight classes each for men and women. Prior to this competition, the existing world and Paralympic records were as follows.

World Record	Siamand Rahman (IRI)	310 kg	Rio de Janeiro, Brazil	14 September 2016
Paralympic Record	Siamand Rahman (IRI)	310 kg	Rio de Janeiro, Brazil	14 September 2016

== Results ==
Rank	Name	Body weight (kg)	Attempts (kg)				Result (kg)
Rank	Name	Body weight (kg)	1	2	3	4	Result (kg)
1st place, gold medalist(s)	Jamil Elshebli (JOR)	134.86	236	241	~~246~~	–	241
2nd place, silver medalist(s)	Mansour Pourmirzaei (IRI)	159.52	235	241	~~246~~	–	241
3rd place, bronze medalist(s)	Faris Al-Ageeli (IRQ)	127.77	222	227	228	–	228
4	Jhon Freddy Castañeda (COL)	123.07	207	218	~~224~~	–	218
5	Konstantinos Dimou (GRE)	153.19	218	~~223~~	~~223~~	–	218
6	Amr Mosaad (EGY)	113.26	206	~~215~~	~~218~~	–	206
7	Chun Keun-bae (KOR)	151.60	200	~~210~~	~~210~~	–	200
	Shamo Aslanov (AZE)	134.52	~~217~~	~~225~~	~~230~~	–	NM
