= Iraq at the 2016 Summer Paralympics =

- IPC code: IRQ
- NPC: Iraqi National Paralympic Committee

in Rio de Janeiro
- Flag bearer: Rasool Mohsin
- Medals Ranked 39th: Gold 2 Silver 3 Bronze 0 Total 5

Summer Paralympics appearances (overview)
- 1992; 1996; 2000; 2004; 2008; 2012; 2016; 2020; 2024

Iraq competed at the 2016 Summer Paralympics in Rio de Janeiro, Brazil, from 7 to 18 September 2016.

== Disability classifications ==
Every participant at the Paralympics has their disability grouped into one of five disability categories; amputation, the condition may be congenital or sustained through injury or illness; cerebral palsy; wheelchair athletes, there is often overlap between this and other categories; visual impairment, including blindness; Les autres, any physical disability that does not fall strictly under one of the other categories, for example dwarfism or multiple sclerosis. Each Paralympic sport then has its own classifications, dependent upon the specific physical demands of competition. Events are given a code, made of numbers and letters, describing the type of event and classification of the athletes competing. Some sports, such as athletics, divide athletes by both the category and severity of their disabilities, other sports, for example swimming, group competitors from different categories together, the only separation being based on the severity of the disability.

== Archery ==
Jawad Al-Musawi earned Iraq a spot at the Rio Games following his performance at the 2015 World Archery Para Championships in the men's recurve open. He had an upset win against Italy's Roberto Airoldi on his way to earning his spot.

== See also ==
- Iraq at the 2016 Summer Olympics
