= Powerlifting at the 2012 Summer Paralympics – Men's +100 kg =

Men's +100 kg powerlifting event at the 2012 Summer Paralympics

Powerlifting – Men's +100 kg at the XIV Paralympic Games
- Venue: ExCeL London
- Date: 5 September 2012
- Competitors: 11 from 11 nations
- Winning lift: 280.0 kg

Medalists
1st place, gold medalist(s)		Siamand Rahman	Iran
2nd place, silver medalist(s)		Faris Abed	Iraq
3rd place, bronze medalist(s)		Chun Keun-bae	South Korea

The men's +100 kg powerlifting event at the 2012 Summer Paralympics was contested on 5 September at ExCeL London.

== Records ==
Prior to the competition, the existing world and Paralympic records were as follows.

World record	291.0 kg	Siamand Rahman (IRI)	Sharjah, United Arab Emirates	4 December 2011
Paralympic record	265.0 kg	Kazem Rajabi Golojeh (IRI)	Beijing, China	16 September 2008

== Results ==
Rank	Name	Group	Body weight (kg)	Attempts (kg)				Result (kg)
Rank	Name	Group	Body weight (kg)	1	2	3	4	Result (kg)
1st place, gold medalist(s)	Siamand Rahman (IRI)	A	173.46	270.0	280.0	~~301.0~~	–	280.0 PR
2nd place, silver medalist(s)	Faris Abed (IRQ)	A	118.77	237.0	242.0	~~261.0~~	–	242.0
3rd place, bronze medalist(s)	Chun Keun-bae (KOR)	A	151.91	227.0	232.0	~~237.0~~	–	232.0
4	Darren Gardiner (AUS)	A	125.61	227.0	231.0	~~236.0~~	–	231.0
5	Maharram Aliyev (AZE)	A	152.66	230.0	~~233.0~~	~~237.0~~	–	230.0
6	Mohamed Sabet (EGY)	A	109.99	225.0	~~230.0~~	~~232.0~~	–	225.0
7	Haidarah Abdallah Hasan Alkawamleh (JOR)	A	107.18	208.0	215.0	~~220.0~~	–	215.0
8	Csaba Szavai (HUN)	A	126.64	192.0	~~196.0~~	~~196.0~~	–	192.0
9	Jose Arnaldo Chirinos Vargas (VEN)	A	107.13	175.0	~~182.0~~	182.0	–	182.0
–	Ahmed Khamis Albaloushi (UAE)	A	114.58	~~175.0~~	~~175.0~~	~~175.0~~	–	NMR

Key: PR=Paralympic record; WR=World record; NMR=No marks recorded
