= Powerlifting at the 2008 Summer Paralympics – Men's 56 kg =

Powerlifting - Men's 56 kg at the XIII Paralympic Games
- Venue: Beihang University Gymnasium
- Date: 11 September 2008
- Competitors: 14 from 14 nations

Medalists
1st place, gold medalist(s)		Sherif Othman	Egypt
2nd place, silver medalist(s)		Rasool Mohsin	Iraq
3rd place, bronze medalist(s)		Jung Keum-Jong	South Korea

The men's 56 kg powerlifting event at the 2008 Summer Paralympics was contested on 11 September at the Beihang University Gymnasium in Beijing, China. This event was the third-lightest of the men's powerlifting weight classes, limiting competitors to a maximum of 56 kilograms (123.5 lb) of body mass. Powerlifters were divided into two groups, A and B, with group B beginning their lifts at 13:00 and group A at 13:45.

As with all Paralympic powerlifting events, lifters competed in the bench press. Each athlete was allowed three attempts to bench press as much weight as possible. Athletes attempting to break a record were allowed a fourth attempt. For the attempt to be valid, the competitor must have lowered the weighted bar to his chest, held it motionless for a moment, and then pressed it upwards until his arms were fully extended. If the competitor failed to meet these requirements or any other rule infraction was committed, the attempt was declared invalid by a team of three referees and the result was struck from the record.

== Results ==
Rank	Name	Group	Body weight (kg)	Attempts (kg)				Result (kg)
Rank	Name	Group	Body weight (kg)	1	2	3	4	Result (kg)
1st place, gold medalist(s)	Sherif Othman (EGY)	A	55.21	195.0 WR	200.0 WR	202.5 WR	–	202.5
2nd place, silver medalist(s)	Rasool Mohsin (IRQ)	A	55.07	180.0	185.0	~~187.5~~	–	185.0
3rd place, bronze medalist(s)	Jung Keum-Jong (KOR)	A	55.11	180.0	~~185.0~~	~~187.5~~	–	180.0
4	Thongsa Marasri (THA)	A	55.12	175.0	180.0	~~182.5~~	–	180.0
5	Wang Jian (CHN)	A	55.21	180.0	~~187.5~~	~~187.5~~	–	180.0
6	Jason Irving (GBR)	A	54.86	170.0	177.5	~~180.0~~	–	177.5
7	Gholam Hossein Chaltoukkar (IRI)	A	55.63	165.0	172.5	~~182.5~~	–	172.5
8	Samson Okutto (KEN)	B	55.22	155.0	160.0	165.0	–	165.0
9	Faisal Hammash (JOR)	B	54.27	160.0	~~165.0~~	~~165.0~~	–	160.0
10	Abebe Fekadu (AUS)	B	55.34	150.0	155.0	~~162.5~~	–	155.0
11	Badar Al Harthy (OMA)	B	54.70	125.0	132.5	142.5	–	142.5
12	Andriy Hurnakov (UKR)	B	55.73	135.0	140.0	~~142.5~~	–	140.0
13	Roman Omurbekov (KGZ)	B	55.88	135.0	~~140.0~~	~~142.5~~	–	135.0
14	Mohammad Alkhalifah (KUW)	B	54.45	120.0	127.5	130.0	–	130.0

Key: WR=World record
