= Fikadu =

Fikadu or Fekadu is a surname of Ethiopian origin. Notable people with the surname include:

- Abebe Fekadu (born 1970), Ethiopian-Australian Paralympic weightlifter
- Belaynesh Fikadu (born 1987), Ethiopian long-distance runner
- Habtamu Fikadu (born 1988), Ethiopian long-distance runner
