= Powerlifting at the 2008 Summer Paralympics – Men's 90 kg =

Powerlifting - Men's 90 kg at the XIII Paralympic Games
- Venue: Beihang University Gymnasium
- Date: 15 September 2008
- Competitors: 10 from 10 nations

Medalists
1st place, gold medalist(s)		Cai Huichao	China
2nd place, silver medalist(s)		Mohammed Khamis Khalaf	United Arab Emirates
3rd place, bronze medalist(s)		Ryszard Rogala	Poland

The men's 90 kg powerlifting event at the 2008 Summer Paralympics was contested on 15 September at the Beihang University Gymnasium in Beijing, China. This event was the third-heaviest of the men's powerlifting weight classes, limiting competitors to a maximum of 90 kilograms (198.4 lb) of body mass.

As with all Paralympic powerlifting events, lifters competed in the bench press. Each athlete was allowed three attempts to bench press as much weight as possible. Athletes attempting to break a record were allowed a fourth attempt. For the attempt to be valid, the competitor must have lowered the weighted bar to his chest, held it motionless for a moment, then pressed the bar upwards until his arms were fully extended. If the competitor failed to meet these requirements or any other rule infraction was committed, the attempt was declared invalid by a team of three referees and the result struck from the record.

== Results ==
Rank	Name	Body weight (kg)	Attempts (kg)				Result (kg)
Rank	Name	Body weight (kg)	1	2	3	4	Result (kg)
1st place, gold medalist(s)	Cai Huichao (CHN)	89.10	230.0	235.0	~~245.0~~	–	235.0
2nd place, silver medalist(s)	Mohammed Khamis Khalaf (UAE)	87.91	222.5	225.0	227.5	–	227.5
3rd place, bronze medalist(s)	Ryszard Rogala (POL)	87.49	215.0	~~222.5~~	~~225.0~~	–	215.0
4	Jesus Castillo (MEX)	86.11	~~200.0~~	200.0	~~215.0~~	–	200.0
5	Elshan Huseynov (AZE)	89.22	~~190.0~~	~~190.0~~	190.0	–	190.0
6	Charly Castel (FRA)	89.67	190.0	~~195.0~~	~~202.5~~	–	190.0
7	Jose Chirinos (VEN)	88.68	175.0	~~182.5~~	~~182.5~~	–	175.0
8	Iago Gorgodze (GEO)	88.47	140.0	~~150.0~~	~~155.0~~	–	140.0
–	Park Jong-Chul (KOR)	88.07	~~242.5~~	~~242.5~~	~~242.5~~	–	NMR
–	Solomon Amarakuo (NGR)	88.50	~~220.0~~	~~225.0~~	~~225.0~~	–	NMR

Key: NMR=No marks recorded
