= Powerlifting at the 2024 Summer Paralympics – Men's 80 kg =

Powerlifting – Men's 80 kg at the XVII Paralympic Games
- Venue: Porte de La Chapelle Arena, Paris
- Date: 6 September 2024
- Competitors: 9 from 9 nations

Medalists
1st place, gold medalist(s)		Rouhollah Rostami	Iran
2nd place, silver medalist(s)		Gu Xiaofei	China
3rd place, bronze medalist(s)		Rasool Mohsin	Iraq

The men's 80 kg powerlifting event at the 2024 Summer Paralympics was contested on 6 September at Porte de La Chapelle Arena, Paris.

== Records ==
There are twenty powerlifting events, corresponding to ten weight classes each for men and women. Prior to this competition, the existing world and Paralympic records were as follows.

World Record	Rouhollah Rostami (IRI)	241 kg	Bangkok, Thailand	7 May 2021
Paralympic Record	Majid Farzin (IRI)	240 kg	Rio de Janeiro, Brazil	12 September 2016

== Results ==
Rank	Name	Body weight (kg)	Attempts (kg)			Result (kg)
Rank	Name	Body weight (kg)	1	2	3	Result (kg)
1st place, gold medalist(s)	Rouhollah Rostami (IRI)	79.8	230	234	242	242 WR
2nd place, silver medalist(s)	Gu Xiaofei (CHN)	78.1	225	~~231~~	~~231~~	225
3rd place, bronze medalist(s)	Rasool Mohsin (IRQ)	79.1	215	~~223~~	~~226~~	215
4	Kim Gyu-ho (KOR)	78.3	202	~~207~~	~~216~~	202
5	Matthew Harding (GBR)	76.9	192	198	200	200
6	Hadi Darvish (RPT)	78.3	193	198	~~203~~	198
7	Adou Hervé Ano (CIV)	79.6	186	~~190~~	191	191
8	Jesús Rodríguez (DOM)	79.6	190	~~197~~	~~197~~	190
9	Ailton Bento de Souza (BRA)	79.4	~~187~~	~~187~~	187	187
