= Ray Epstein =

Australian Paralympic weightlifter and powerlifting coach

Ray Epstein OAM
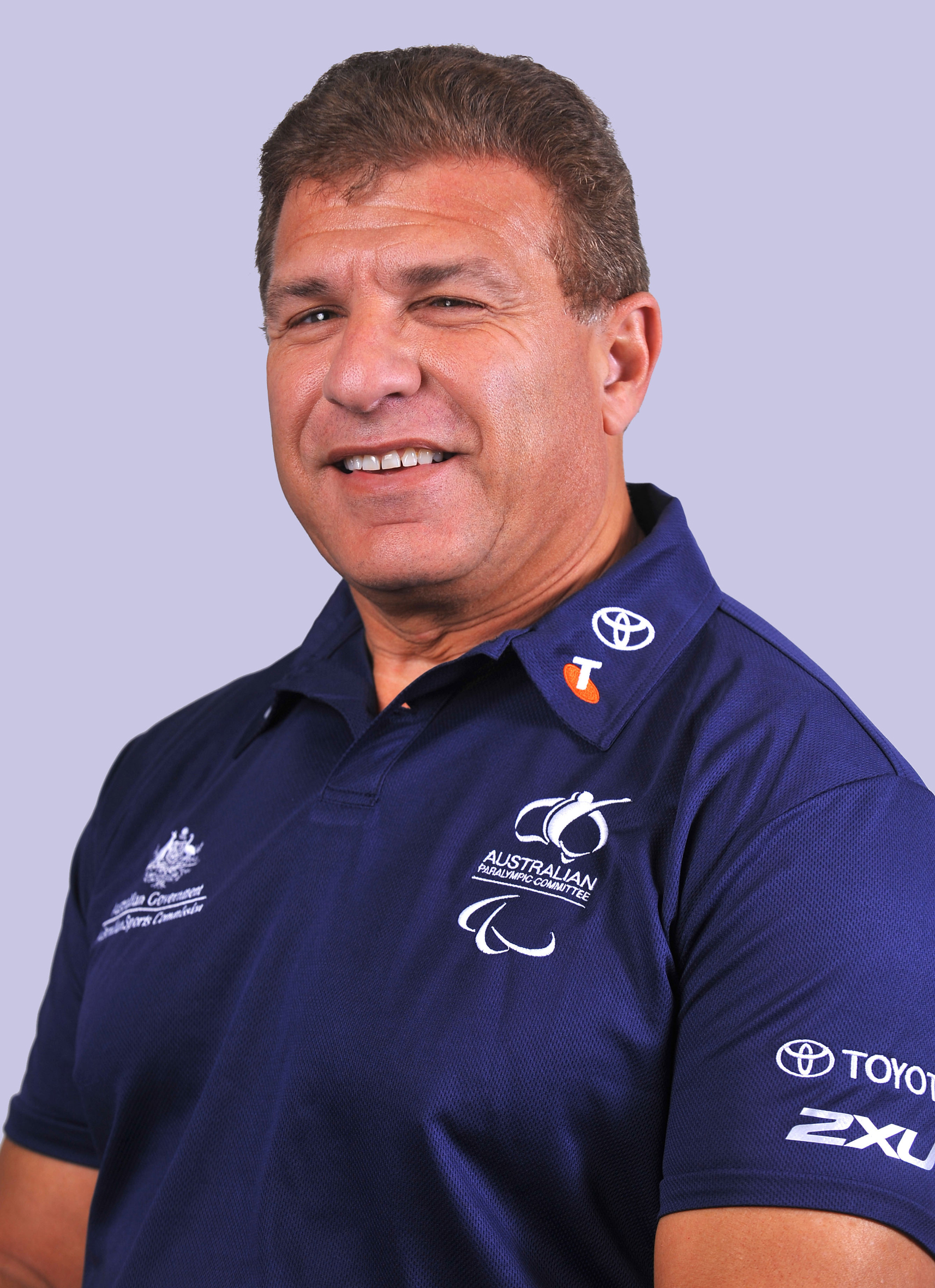
- 2012 Australian Paralympic team portrait of Ray Epstein

Personal information
- Full name: Ramon Gary Epstein
- Nationality: Australia
- Born: 14 October 1959 (age 66) Brisbane, Queensland

Ramon (Ray) Gary Epstein, OAM (born 14 October 1959) is an Australian Paralympic weightlifter and powerlifting coach. He represented Australia in weightlifting at the 1988 Seoul and 1992 Barcelona Paralympics and was Head Coach of the Australian Paralympic powerlifting team between 2003 and 2013.

== Personal life ==
Epstein was born in Brisbane. He became a paraplegic in 1972 following a gym accident. He became a member of the Sporting Wheelies and Disabled Association in 1977 and competed in a number of sports including wheelchair basketball and athletics before focusing on weightlifting.

He was admitted as a Chartered Accountant in 1985 and joined the Sporting Wheelies and Disabled Association as Administration and Finance Manager in 1990. He was the chief executive officer of the Association from 1998 to December 2016, and was appointed to the Board of the Queensland Academy of Sport in 2008.

In 2002, his wife Vicki wrote the book Step by step we conquer : the story of Queensland's Sporting Wheelies and Disabled Association.

== Sporting career ==
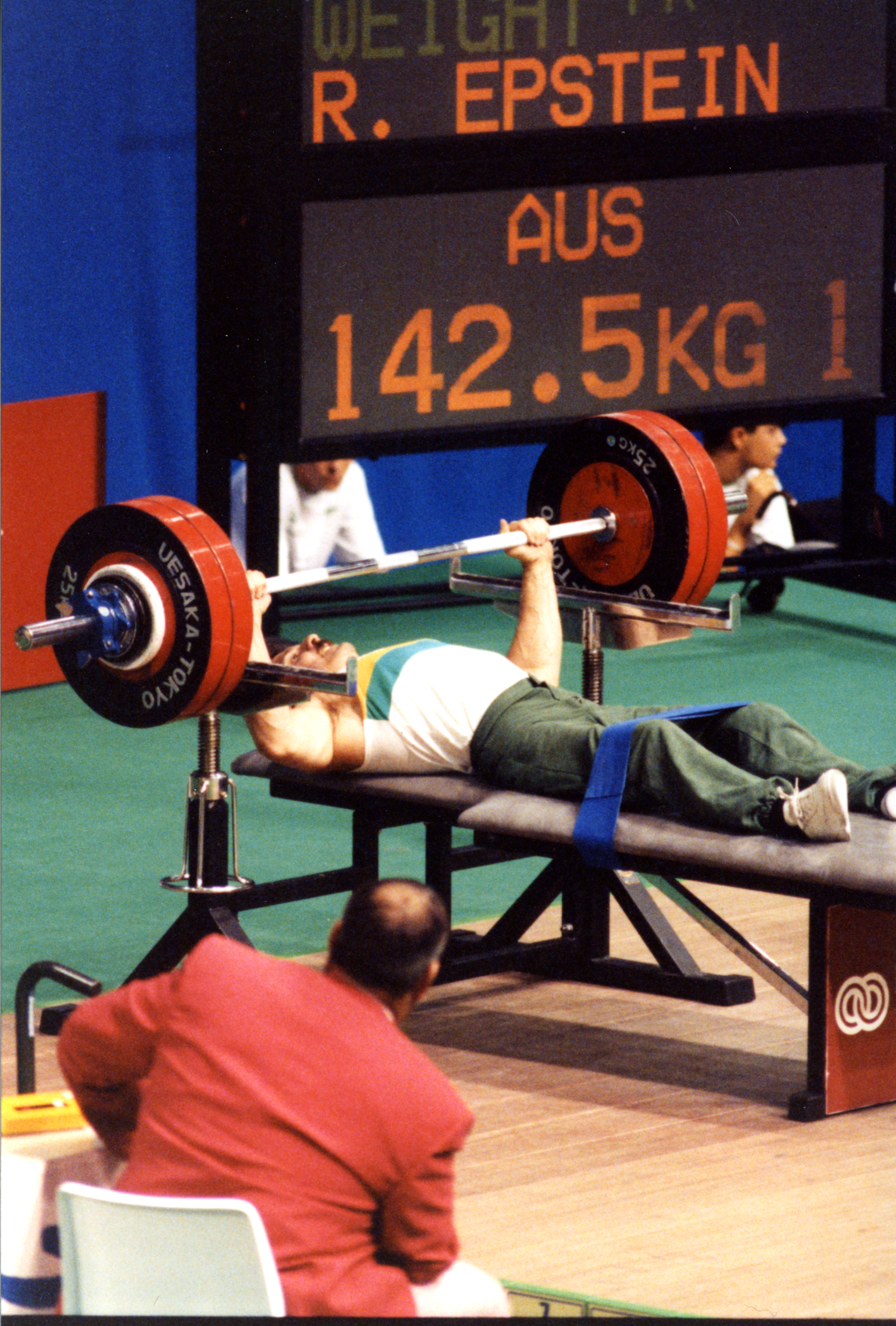
Ray Epstein lifting at the 1992 Barcelona Paralympics

Epstein competed in state, national and international weightlifting/powerlifting (bench press) competitions for athletes with a disability from 1979 to 1995. He took a break from competition in 1983–84 to pursue a professional qualification in accounting. He represented Australia at 12 international competitions, including the 1988 Seoul Paralympic Games and 1992 Barcelona Games, where he was male Captain of the Australian Team.

His career highlights included silver medals at the World Wheelchair Weightlifting Championships in 1990 (Saint-Etienne, France) and 1991 (Rhode Island, United States), and gold medals and world records in the 56 kg division at the 1993 World Cup in Northampton, England and the 1994 World Wheelchair Weightlifting Championships (Melbourne). During his career, he held Australian records in five separate body weight categories from 48 kg to 67.5 kg bodyweight divisions. He was a scholarship holder under the elite athlete programs of the Australian Institute of Sport (1992 and 1995) and the Queensland Academy of Sport (1992–1995).

Following his retirement in 1995, he became an accredited IPC Powerlifting Referee.

== Coaching career ==
Epstein started coaching towards the end of his lifting career due to a shortage of powerlifting coaching staff in Australia at that time. He was appointed Assistant National Coach Powerlifting in 1999 and became National Head Coach Powerlifting in 2003.

He was Assistant Coach of the powerlifting team at the 2000 Sydney Paralympics and Head Coach for the 2004 Athens, 2008 Beijing, and 2012 London Paralympic Games.

Notable powerlifters coached by Epstein include dual Paralympic silver medalist Darren Gardiner, Paralympic bronze medalist Mick Farrell, Steve Green, Abebe Fekadu, and pioneering female lifters Julie Russell and Deahnne McIntyre.

He announced his retirement as Australian Paralympic Powerlifting head coach in July 2013.

== Recognition ==
Epstein was awarded a Medal of the Order of Australia (OAM) in the 1994 Queen's Birthday Honours List for services to people with a disability and the sport of weightlifting, and received an Australian Sports Medal in 2000. He was named the Coach of the Year by the Sporting Wheelies and Disabled Association in 1998, 2004, and 2006. He won the Inspiring Individual Award at the 2014 Queensland Disability Awards. At the 2016 Queensland Sport Awards, he was awarded a Service to Sport Award.
