= Cai Huichao =

Chinese Paralympic powerlifter

Personal information
- Born: 22 October 1983 (age 42) Shanghai, China

Sport
- Country: China
- Sport: Paralympic powerlifting
- Disability: Cerebral palsy
Medal record
Paralympic Games
Gold medal – first place	2008 Beijing	90 kg
Silver medal – second place	2012 London	90 kg
Asian Para Games
Gold medal – first place	2010 Guangzhou	90 kg

Cai Huichao (born 22 October 1983) is a Chinese Paralympic powerlifter with cerebral palsy. He represented China at the 2008 Summer Paralympics, at the 2012 Summer Paralympics and at the 2016 Summer Paralympics and he won two medals: the gold medal in the men's 90 kg event in 2008 and the silver medal in the men's 90 kg event in 2012.

At the 2010 Asian Para Games held in Guangzhou, China, he won the gold medal in the men's 90 kg event.
