= Powerlifting at the 2012 Summer Paralympics – Men's 90 kg =

Powerlifting – Men's 90 kg at the XIV Paralympic Games
- Venue: ExCeL London
- Date: 4 September 2012
- Competitors: 11 from 11 nations
- Winning lift: 241

Medalists
1st place, gold medalist(s)		Hany Abdelhady	Egypt
2nd place, silver medalist(s)		Cai Huichao	China
3rd place, bronze medalist(s)		Pavlos Mamalos	Greece

The men's 90 kg powerlifting event at the 2012 Summer Paralympics was contested on 4 September at ExCeL London.

== Records ==
Prior to the competition, the existing world and Paralympic records were as follows.

World record	250.0 kg	Jong Chul Park (KOR)	Busan, South Korea	30 October 2002
Paralympic record	240.0 kg	Jong Chul Park (KOR)	Athens, Greece	26 September 2004

== Results ==
Rank	Name	Group	Rack Height	Body weight (kg)	Attempts (kg)				Result (kg)
Rank	Name	Group	Rack Height	Body weight (kg)	1	2	3	4	Result (kg)
1st place, gold medalist(s)	Hany Abdelhady (EGY)	A	17	87.79	232	240	241	~~250.5~~	241
2nd place, silver medalist(s)	Cai Huichao (CHN)	A	12	89.79	225	230	233	–	233
3rd place, bronze medalist(s)	Pavlos Mamalos (GRE)	A	14	87.09	232	~~236~~	~~236~~	–	232
4	Hamed Solhipour (IRI)	A	16	84.74	217	225	~~232~~	–	225
5	Jabbar Jaber (IRQ)	B	16	89.01	180	~~190~~	195	–	195
6	Rodrigo Marques (BRA)	B	14	89.58	~~192~~	192	~~197~~	–	192
7	Vadim Rakitin (RUS)	B	15	88.69	~~190~~	~~190~~	190	–	190
8	Issam Al Balushi (OMA)	B	14	87.45	165	172	~~180~~	–	172
-	Jose de Jesus Castillo Castillo (MEX)	A	16	88.62	~~217~~	~~217~~	~~217~~	–	NMR
-	Abdulazeez Ibrahim (NGR)	B	14	88.56	-	-	-	–	DNS
-	Mohammed Khamis Khalaf (UAE)	A	15	88.42	~~215~~	-	-	–	DNF
