= Iraq at the 1992 Summer Paralympics =

- IPC code: IRQ
- NPC: Iraqi National Paralympic Committee

in Barcelona
- Competitors: 18
- Medals Ranked 55th: Gold 0 Silver 0 Bronze 1 Total 1

Summer Paralympics appearances (overview)
- 1992; 1996; 2000; 2004; 2008; 2012; 2016; 2020; 2024

Eighteen male athletes were representing Iraq at the 1992 Summer Paralympics in Barcelona, Spain. It was the nation’s first Paralympics Games.

== See also ==
- 1992 Summer Paralympics
