= Iraq at the 1996 Summer Paralympics =

- IPC code: IRQ
- NPC: Iraqi National Paralympic Committee

in Atlanta
- Competitors: 12 in 1 sport
- Medals: Gold 0 Silver 0 Bronze 0 Total 0

Summer Paralympics appearances (overview)
- 1992; 1996; 2000; 2004; 2008; 2012; 2016; 2020; 2024

Twelve male athletes were scheduled to represent Iraq at the 1996 Summer Paralympics in Atlanta, United States.

== Controversy ==
Before the 1996 Atlanta Paralympic Games, the Iraqi wheelchair basketball men's team was to participate in the tournament and the team was drawn in the second preliminary group with (Sweden, France, Netherlands, USA, Japan). But in the 1996 Summer Olympics, the Iraqi flag bearer Raed Ahmed, at the opening ceremony, requested political asylum in the United States of America, the venue of the Games. The Iraqi government decided not to send the Paralympic delegation, which only included the wheelchair basketball team.

== See also ==
- 1996 Summer Paralympics
