= Mohammed Khamis Khalaf =

United Arab Emirati Paralympic powerlifter

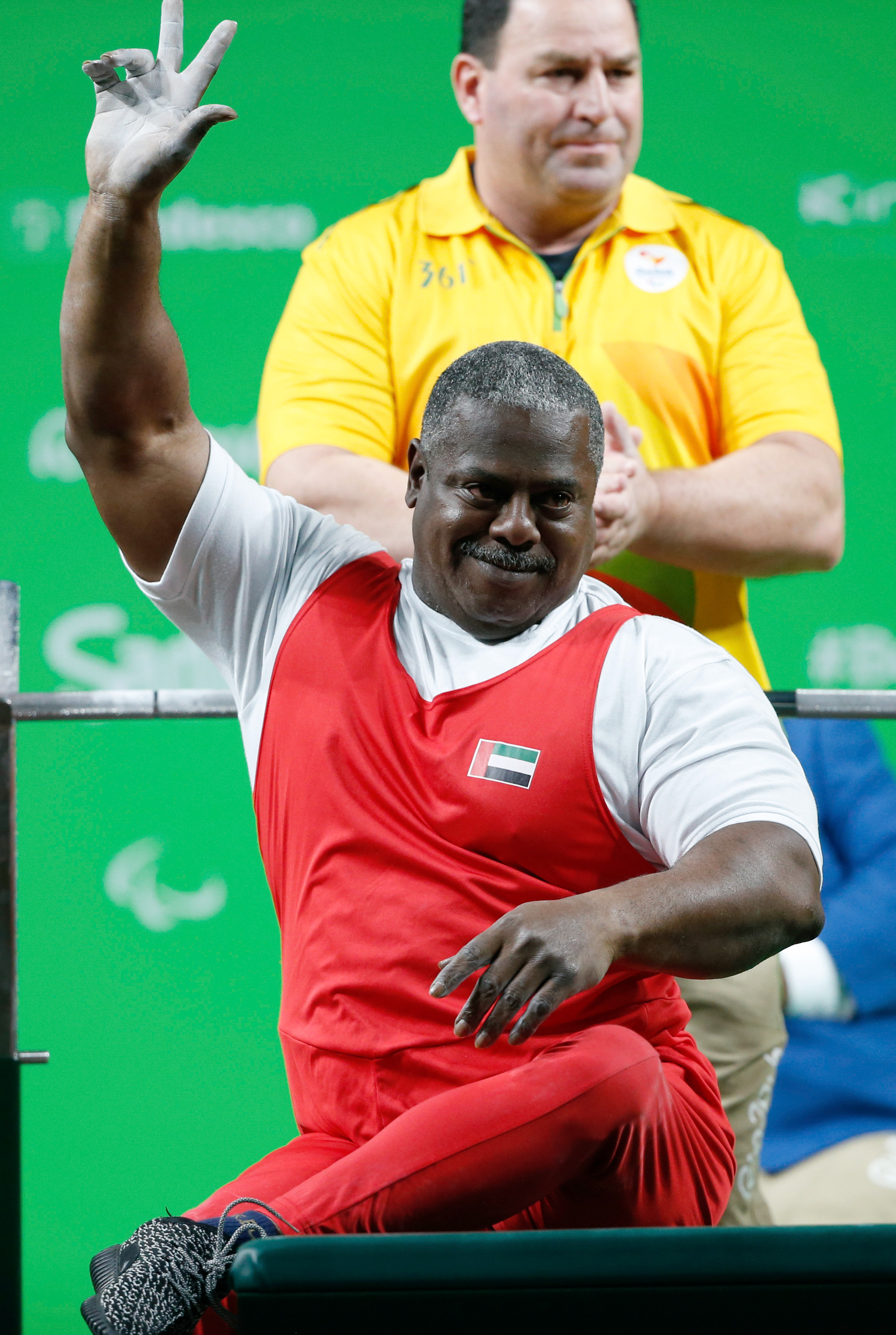
- Mohammed Khamis Khalaf (2016)

Personal information
- Born: 23 February 1969 (age 57)

Sport
- Country: United Arab Emirates
- Sport: Paralympic powerlifting
- Disability: Leg paralysis caused by polio
Medal record
Summer Paralympics
| Gold medal – first place | 2004 Athens | 82.5 kg |
| Gold medal – first place | 2016 Rio de Janeiro | 88 kg |
| Silver medal – second place | 2008 Beijing | 90 kg |
Asian Para Games
| Gold medal – first place | 2014 Incheon | 97 kg |
| Silver medal – second place | 2010 Guangzhou | 90 kg |
| Silver medal – second place | 2018 Jakarta | 97 kg |

Mohammed Khamis Khalaf (born 23 February 1969) is a Paralympic powerlifter from United Arab Emirates. He represented his country at the Summer Paralympics in 2004, 2008, 2012, 2016 and 2021. In total, he won three medals: two gold medals and one silver medal. He is also the first Paralympic competitor to win a gold medal for the country at the Summer Paralympics.

In 2004, he won the gold medal in the men's 82.5 kg event and in 2008 he won the silver medal in the men's 90 kg event. He failed to win a medal at the men's 90 kg event in 2012. He once again won a medal in 2016: the gold medal in the men's 88 kg event.

In 2019, he competed at the World Para Powerlifting Championships held in Nur-Sultan, Kazakhstan without winning a medal.

In 2021, he competed in the men's 88 kg event at the 2020 Summer Paralympics held in Tokyo, Japan where he left the stage without a successful lift due to a shoulder injury.
