= Deahnne McIntyre =

Australian Paralympic powerlifter

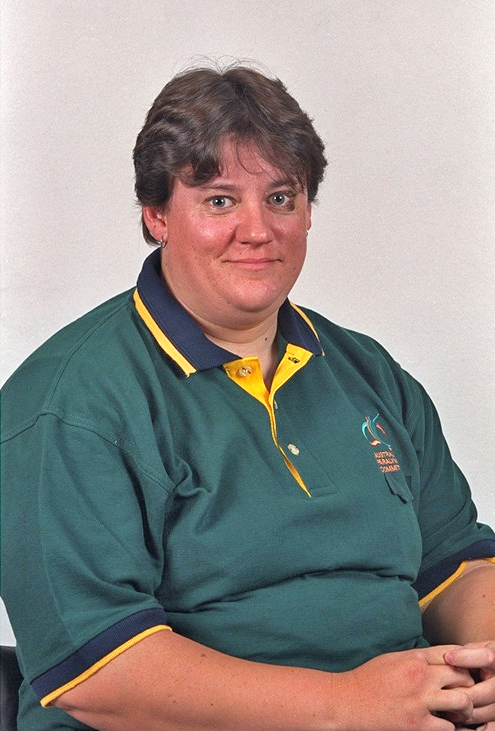
- 2000 Australian Paralympic team portrait

Personal information
- Full name: Deahnne Mary McIntyre
- Nationality: Australia
- Born: 9 June 1971 (age 55)
Medal record
Athletics
Paralympic Games
Gold medal – first place	1988 Seoul	Women's 200 m 5–6
Silver medal – second place	1988 Seoul	Women's 400 m 5–6
Silver medal – second place	1988 Seoul	Women's 4 × 400 m 2–6
Bronze medal – third place	1988 Seoul	Women's 100 m 5–6
World Championships and Games for the Disabled
Bronze medal – third place	1990 Assen	Women's 100m T1

Deahnne Mary McIntyre, OAM (born 9 June 1971) is an Australian former Paralympic athletics competitor and one of few Australian female powerlifters. She won four medals in the 1988 Seoul Paralympic Games in athletics, and competed in powerlifting from 2000 until her retirement from the sport in January 2011.

== Personal ==
Deahnne Mary McIntyre was born with spina bifida on 9 June 1971 in Canberra as a twin into a family of six children. She lives in the Canberra suburb of Conder, and works as a contract officer for the Department of Sustainability, Environment, Water, Population and Communities.

== Career ==
McIntyre first became interested in sports at school; her mother coached her in her early years. She was the first person to win a gold medal for the Australian Capital Territory at the Pacific School Games, in which she participated in 1984 and 1988. She carried the Australian flag at the 1988 Games, and later became an ambassador for the event. She was named Young Australian of the Year in 1985; Australia Day Council Chairman John Newcombe described McIntyre as "an inspiration not only to the disabled but to the able bodied. Such excellence cannot go unrecognised." At the age of 14, she won 16 medals (including nine gold) at the third Australian Junior Wheelchair Games in 1985 in events such as wheelchair racing, javelin, discus, table tennis and swimming. She received a Medal of the Order of Australia on Australia Day 1988 "For service to sport, particularly in track and field and swimming". At the 1988 Seoul Paralympics, she won a gold medal in the Women's 200 m 5–6 event, two silver medals, in the Women's 400 m 5–6 event and as part of the Women's 4 × 400 m Relay 2–6 event, and a bronze medal in the Women's 100 m 5–6 event, despite having had an appendectomy four days before her first competition. In 1990, she was an Australian Institute of Sport Athlete with a Disability scholarship holder. She competed at the World Championships and Games for the Disabled in Assen, Netherlands winning a bronze medal in Women's 100m T1 and fourth in Women's 400m T4.

After briefly competing in lawn bowls, she took up powerlifting shortly before the 2000 Sydney Games, the first Paralympics where women were allowed to compete in the sport. In the women's over 82.5 kg powerlifting event, she came fifth at both the 2000 Games and the 2004 Athens Games, and fourth at the 2008 Beijing Games. She was coached by Ray Epstein, and was one of few Australian female powerlifters.

She won a bronze medal at the 2007 IPC European Powerlifting Championships in the 82.5+kg Division; the day after the finals, her mother died of cancer. She put her medal in the crematorium with her mother's body, but four months after the final, she was asked to return it to receive a silver medal because the previous silver medallist had been disqualified. In 2010, she achieved her personal best and an Australian record by lifting 137.5 kilograms (303 lb) at the Fazza International Powerlifting Championships in Dubai. In the same year, she won a silver medal at the 2010 IPC Powerlifting World Championships in Kuala Lumpur and came fifth in the Women's Open Bench Press event at the 2010 Delhi Commonwealth Games. She retired from powerlifting in January 2011.
