= Chun Keun-bae =

South Korean Paralympic powerlifter

Personal information
- Born: 1 January 1978 (age 48)

Sport
- Country: South Korea
- Sport: Paralympic powerlifting
- Disability: Spinal cord injuries
Medal record
Paralympic Games
| Bronze medal – third place | 2012 London | +100 kg |
Asian Para Games
| Bronze medal – third place | 2014 Incheon | +107 kg |

Chun Keun-bae (Korean: 전근배) is a South Korean Paralympic powerlifter. He represented South Korea at the Summer Paralympics in 2012, 2016 and 2021. He won the bronze medal in the men's +100 kg event in 2012.
