= Thaair Hussin =

Iraqi Paralympic powerlifter

Sport
- Country: Iraq
- Sport: Paralympic powerlifting
Medal record
Paralympic Games
Bronze medal – third place	2004 Athens	82.5 kg

Thaair Hussin is an Iraqi Paralympic powerlifter. He represented Iraq at the 2004 Summer Paralympics held in Athens, Greece and he won the bronze medal in the men's 82.5 kg event.
