= Michael Farrell (powerlifter) =

Australian Paralympic powerlifter (born 1962)

Personal information
- Nationality: Australia
- Born: 2 October 1962 (age 63) Elliston, South Australia
Medal record
Powerlifting
Paralympic Games
Bronze medal – third place	1988 Seoul	Men's Up To 100 kg

Michael Farrell (born 2 October 1962) is an Australian Paralympic powerlifter. He was born in the South Australian town of Elliston. He won a bronze medal at the 1988 Seoul Games in the Men's Up To 100 kg event. He finished eight in the Men's Over 100 kg at the 1996 Atlanta Games.
