= Powerlifting at the 2004 Summer Paralympics – Men's 60 kg =

Men's Up To 60 kg at the XII Paralympic Games
- Paralympic Powerlifting
- Venue: Nikaia Olympic Weightlifting Hall
- Dates: 22 September 2004
- Competitors: 16 from 16 nations
- Winning weight(kg): 197.5

Medalists
1st place, gold medalist(s)		Shaban Ibrahim	Egypt
2nd place, silver medalist(s)		Jung Keum Jong	South Korea
3rd place, bronze medalist(s)		Yu Jian	China

The Men's 60 kg powerlifting event at the 2004 Summer Paralympics was competed on 22 September. It was won by Shaban Ibrahim, representing Egypt.

== Final round ==
22 Sept. 2004, 17:15

Rank	Athlete	Weight(kg)	Notes
1st place, gold medalist(s)	Shaban Ibrahim (EGY)	197.5	
2nd place, silver medalist(s)	Jung Keum Jong (KOR)	195.0	
3rd place, bronze medalist(s)	Yu Jian (CHN)	180.0	
4	Gkremislav Moysiadis (GRE)	165.0	
5	Jason Irving (GBR)	165.0	
6	Abdelsalam Gharsa (LBA)	162.5	
7	Mariusz Tomczyk (POL)	160.0	
8	Sergey Meladze (TKM)	152.5	
9	Parviz Odinaev (TJK)	147.5	
10	Sabah Al Shakhtali (KUW)	145.0	
11	Billy Ssengendo (UGA)	145.0	
12	Ruslan Dolobayev (KAZ)	135.0	
13	Khalid Gul Albulushi (OMA)	120.0	
	Murat Ceylan (TUR)	NMR	
	Aleksandr Koroljov (EST)	DSQ	
	Ali Hosseini (IRI)	DSQ	
