= Julie Russell =

Australian Paralympic athlete, powerlifter and wheelchair basketballer

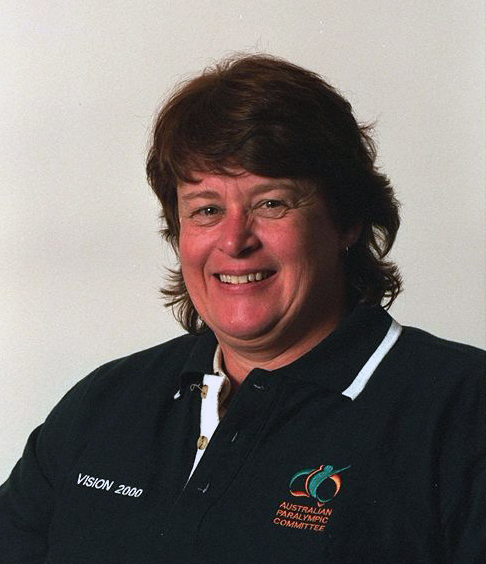
- 2000 Australian Team media guide portrait of Russell

Personal information
- Full name: Julie Elizabeth Russell
- Nationality: Australia
- Born: 20 August 1951 (age 74) Adelaide
Medal record
Paralympic athletics
Paralympic Games
Silver medal – second place	1980 Arnhem	Women's Pentathlon 3
Silver medal – second place	1984 New York/ Stoke Mandeville	Women's Marathon 3
Silver medal – second place	1988 Seoul	Women's 4x400 m Relay 2-6
Silver medal – second place	1988 Seoul	Women's Pentathlon 3
Silver medal – second place	1988 Seoul	Women's Shot Put 3
Bronze medal – third place	1984 New York/ Stoke Mandeville	Women's Pentathlon 3
Bronze medal – third place	1988 Seoul	Women's Discus 3
Bronze medal – third place	1988 Seoul	Women's Javelin 3
Powerlifting
FESPIC Games
Gold medal – first place	1994 Beijing	Women's +82.5 kg
IPC World Powerlifting Championships
Silver medal – second place	1998 Dubai	Women's +82.5 kg
IPC European Powerlifting Championships
Gold medal – first place	1999	Women's +82.5 kg
Silver medal – second place	1998	Women's +82.5 kg

Julie Elizabeth Russell (née Mitchell) (born 20 August 1951) is an Australian Paralympic athlete, powerlifter and wheelchair basketballer.

== Personal ==
Russell was born on 20 August 1951 in Adelaide. As a toddler, she contracted polio, which caused paralysis in her lower body. During her primary school years, Russell had to have calipers fitted and needed crutches for support. Russell graduated from university with a biology degree and began working at the Queen Elizabeth Hospital in the biochemistry department for 5 years before she became involved in sports. After graduating, she became involved in the Adelaide Archery Club and through that became aware of wheelchair sports. In 2006, she was working for CRS Australia, an Australian Government rehabilitation agency.

She has been married to Paralympic athlete, coach, and administrator Eric Russell since 1979. The pair met in 1977 for the first time when Eric came to Adelaide for the first National Basketball Titles. Julie and Eric were then introduced officially in 1978 at the Regional Games in Broken Hill.

== Career ==
Russell won four gold medals, a silver and a bronze in athletics and archery at the 1979 Stoke Mandeville Paraplegic World Games, her first international competitive event. At the 1980 Arnhem Games, she won a silver medal in the Women's Pentathlon 3 event. At the 1984 New York/Stoke-Mandeville Games, she won a silver medal in the Women's Marathon 3 event and a bronze medal in the Women's Pentathlon 3 event. She won three silver medals at the 1988 Seoul Games, in the Women's 4 × 400 m Relay 2–6, Women's Pentathlon 3 and Women's Shot Put 3 events, and two bronze medals in the Women's Discus 3 and Women's Javelin 3 events. She was a member of the Australia women's national wheelchair basketball team in the 1992 Barcelona Games. She was selected to compete in basketball at the 1992 Games not purely for her skills in basketball but also as an experienced athlete who could act as a role model and a calming influence on the younger athletes of the team.

Russell was selected as the Women's Representative for Weightlifting after a meeting in 1984. She won a gold medal at the 1994 FESPIC Games in Beijing in the +82.5 kg event. At the IPC Powerlifting World Championships, she won a silver medal in 1998 in the Women's +82.5 kg event. At the European Powerlifting Championships, she won a silver medal in 1998 in the Women's +82.5 kg event and a gold medal in 1999 in the Women's +82.5 kg event. She competed in powerlifting at the 2000 Sydney Games, the first Paralympics in which women could compete in the sport, after lobbying for the inclusion of women's powerlifting in the Paralympics for the past fourteen years; she came seventh in the women's over 82.5 kg powerlifting event. She was coached in powerlifting by Ray Epstein.

She received an Australian Sports Medal in 2000 for "outstanding contribution to Paralympic Powerlifting". She has refereed powerlifting events at the Paralympics and Commonwealth Games since the 2004 Athens Paralympics.
