= Ahmed Naas =

Iraqi Paralympic athlete

Personal information
- Born: 5 February 1992 (age 34) Nasiriyah, Iraq
- Height: 130 cm (51 in)

Sport
- Country: Iraq
- Sport: Athletics
- Disability class: F40
- Event: javelin throw
Medal record
Track and field
Representing Iraq
Paralympic Games
Silver medal – second place	2012 London	Javelin throw F40
Asian Para Games
Gold medal – first place	2018 Jakarta	Javelin throw F40/41

Ahmed Naas is a Paralympian athlete from Iraq competing in the F40 classification javelin throw. He won a silver medal in the javelin at the 2012 Summer Paralympics in London.

== Athletics career ==
=== 2012 Summer Paralympics ===
Naas took up athletics after being spotted by a coach whilst playing football. He took up the javelin, but dropped the sport in 2009 after a coach said he lacked the athleticism. He returned to the sport in 2010, taking up the javelin full-time. His results at local competitions saw him selected for the Iraq team at the 2012 Summer Paralympics in London, where he attended training camps in Baghdad and Turkey.

At the Games he entered the F40 category javelin event. There in his fifth throw he recorded a distance of 43.27m, a new world record that put him into the lead. On seeing the distance, Naas cartwheeled across the track before falling to his knees, to the delight of the crowd. Unfortunately for Naas he failed to win the event, after China's Wang Zhiming recorded a distance of 47.95m in his final throw to set a new world record and take gold. Despite being beaten into silver medal place the crowd responded with rapturous applause when he took to the podium to receive his medal.

Buoyed by the reaction at London and having won one of only a handful of medals for his country, Naas believed that he would return to his home a "...king of sport in Iraq" and a national symbol. The reality was very different. When he arrived back in Iraq, there was no one to greet him and he took a taxi alone from Baghdad airport to his home in Batha. He spent his prize money, given to him through various government sources, buying a plot of land in Batha. He was forced to return to work at his family's grocery stall, and now continues to train using rudimentary equipment, without a coach or training grounds.

=== 2016 Summer Paralympics ===
At the 2016 Summer Paralympics in Rio, the International Paralympic Committee, despite just four years earlier choosing to create two different categories for athletes of short stature to create a fairer playing field, dropped Nass' F40 javelin event from the Games' schedule. Naas still qualified for the Games but he was again placed into the same grouping as the F41 athletes, and there was no points system used to give the F40 athletes greater weighting to their distances. This saw Naas fail to make the final eight, even though his second round throw of 35.29 metres was a new world record for the T40 class. A year later the same situation occurred at the 2017 World Para Athletics Championships in London. Naas qualified for the javelin throw (F41), this time finishing fifth behind the F41 athletes, with another world record of 38.90 metres.
