= David Short (cyclist) =

Australian Paralympian

David Short OAM
Personal information
- Full name: David Arthur Short
- Nationality: Australia
Medal record
Cycling
Paralympic Games
Gold medal – first place	2004 Athens	Men's Sprint Tandem B1-3

David Arthur Short is an Australian Paralympic tandem cycling pilot, who piloted Kieran Modra in sprint events, most notably at the 2004 Athens Games. He won a gold medal at the games in the Men's Sprint Tandem B1-3 event, for which he received a Medal of the Order of Australia. In the second of the three races in the individual sprint semi-final, Short and Modra fell off their bike after its front tyre rolled off the wheel. Despite having skin torn off their arms, legs and shoulders in the fall, they won the third semi-final race and rode in the final 45 minutes later, where they won the gold medal.
