= Athens Olympic Velodrome =

Track cycling stadium in Greece

- Athens Olympic Velodrome
- Interactive map of Athens Olympic Velodrome
- Location: Marousi, Athens, Greece
- Coordinates: 38.0401°N 23.7804°E
- Owner: Hellenic Olympic Committee
- Operator: Hellenic Olympic Committee
- Capacity: 5,250
- Surface: Afzelia hardwood
- Field size: 250 m (820 ft) track

Construction
- Opened: 1991
- Renovated: 2004
- Closed: 2023 (Temporarily)
- Reopened: 2024
- Architect: Santiago Calatrava

The Athens Olympic Velodrome is a velodrome stadium that is located in Marousi, Athens, Greece, at the Athens Olympic Sports Complex. The venue, which have the capacity for 5,250 people, but only 3,300 seats were used due to the security measures available for the 2004 Summer Olympic Games and the 2004 Summer Paralympics. It has distinctive twin roofs, covering the stands on each side.

== History ==
Interior of the velodrome in 2004

The Velodrome was originally built between 1989 and 1991 as an outdoor venue to host the 1991 Mediterranean Games. However, the original planning for the 2004 Summer Olympics did not include any renovations to the velodrome or even a roof. But, soon after the Atlanta Games in 1996, the UCI found that weather conditions interfered directly in the tests, it was decided that from Sydney 2000, the Olympic tests would have to be in covered velodromes and there was a need for a general reform in the place that lbe gave a more modern track and a controversial ceiling in order to host the track cycling events at the 2004 Athens Summer Olympics and track cycling events at the 2004 Summer Paralympics. The project was designed by the Spanish architect Santiago Calatrava who added a roof to harmonize with the Olympic Stadium and the projected swimming outdoor pools ceiling. The track, made of Afzelia wood, is 250 metres (820 ft) long and 7.5 metres (25 ft) wide. Reconstruction of the stadium was completed on May 30, 2004, and it was officially re-opened on July 30, 2004.

In September 2023 the venue was shut down due to the findings of a study that showed that the roof was not meeting the safety requirements.

== See also ==
- List of cycling tracks and velodromes
