= Iraq at the 2004 Summer Paralympics =

- Flag of Iraq
- IPC code: IRQ
- NPC: Iraqi National Paralympic Committee

in Athens
- Competitors: 8 in 3 sports
- Medals Ranked 53rd: Gold 1 Silver 0 Bronze 1 Total 2

Summer Paralympics appearances (overview)
- 1992; 1996; 2000; 2004; 2008; 2012; 2016; 2020; 2024

Iraq competed at the 2004 Summer Paralympics in Athens, Greece. The team included eight athletes, all of them being men.

== Medallists ==
Medal	Name	Sport	Event
Gold	Faris Abed	Powerlifting	Men's +100kg
Bronze	Thaair Hussin	Powerlifting	Men's 82.5kg

== Sports ==
=== Athletics ===
==== Men's field ====
Athlete	Class	Event	Final		
Athlete	Class	Event	Result	Points	Rank
Mohamd Baker	F42	Discus	36.99	-	7
Bashar Meklef	F55	Discus	30.26	-	6
Bashar Meklef	F55-56	Javelin	19.30	660	19

=== Powerlifting ===
Athlete	Event	Result	Rank
Faris Abed	+100kg	237.5	1st place, gold medalist(s)
Thaair Hussin	82.5kg	202.5	3rd place, bronze medalist(s)
Mohammed Karim	52kg	152.5	4
Hasan Reda Ali	100kg	170.0	12

=== Wheelchair fencing ===
==== Men ====
Athlete	Event	Qualification			Round of 16	Quarterfinal	Semifinal	Final / BM	
Athlete	Event	Opposition	Score	Rank	Opposition Score	Opposition Score	Opposition Score	Opposition Score	Rank
Kaled Khder	Men's foil A	Zhang L (CHN)	L 4–5	6	did not advance				
Kaled Khder	Men's foil A	Makowski (POL)	L 1-5	6	did not advance				
Kaled Khder	Men's foil A	Chan K L (HKG)	L 0-5	6	did not advance				
Kaled Khder	Men's foil A	van der Wege (USA)	L 2-5	6	did not advance				
Kaled Khder	Men's foil A	J Fernandez (ESP)	L 1-5	6	did not advance				
Kaled Khder	Men's sabre A	Makowski (POL)	L 1-5	6	did not advance				
Kaled Khder	Men's sabre A	El Assine (FRA)	L 1-5	6	did not advance				
Kaled Khder	Men's sabre A	Chan K L (HKG)	L 0-5	6	did not advance				
Kaled Khder	Men's sabre A	J Fernandez (ESP)	L 2-5	6	did not advance				
Kaled Khder	Men's sabre A	Doeme (HUN)	W 5-2	6	did not advance				

== See also ==
- Iraq at the Paralympics
- Iraq at the 2004 Summer Olympics
