= Anthony Biddle (Paralympian) =

Australian Paralympic tandem cyclist and athlete

Anthony Biddle OAM
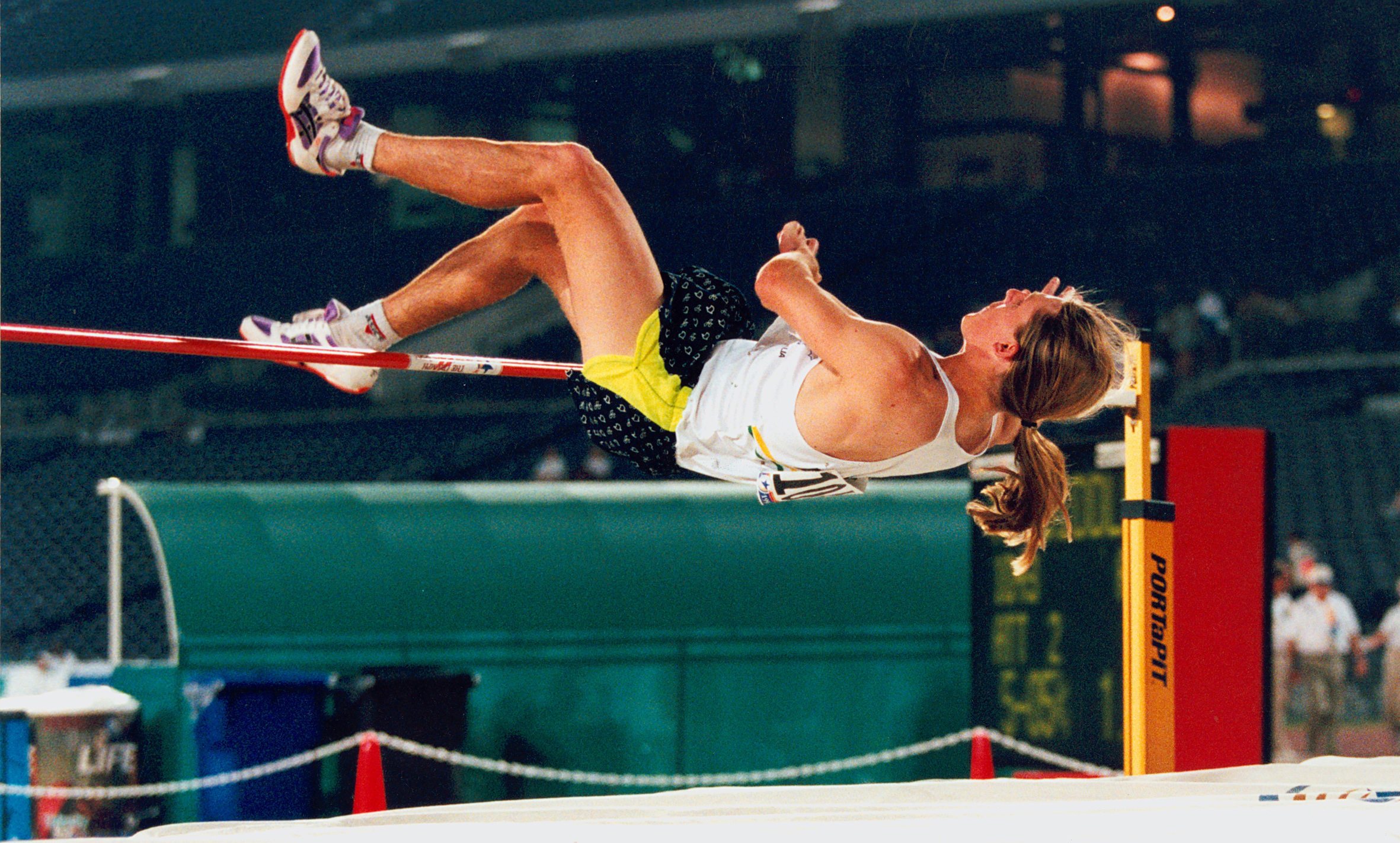
- Anthony Biddle competing in the high jump at the 1996 Atlanta Games

Personal information
- Full name: Anthony John Biddle
- Nationality: Australia
- Born: 18 June 1975 (age 51) Gosford
Medal record
Cycling
Paralympic Games
| Gold medal – first place | 2004 Athens | Men's 1 km Time Trial Tandem B1–3 |
| Bronze medal – third place | 2004 Athens | Men's Sprint Tandem B1–3 |

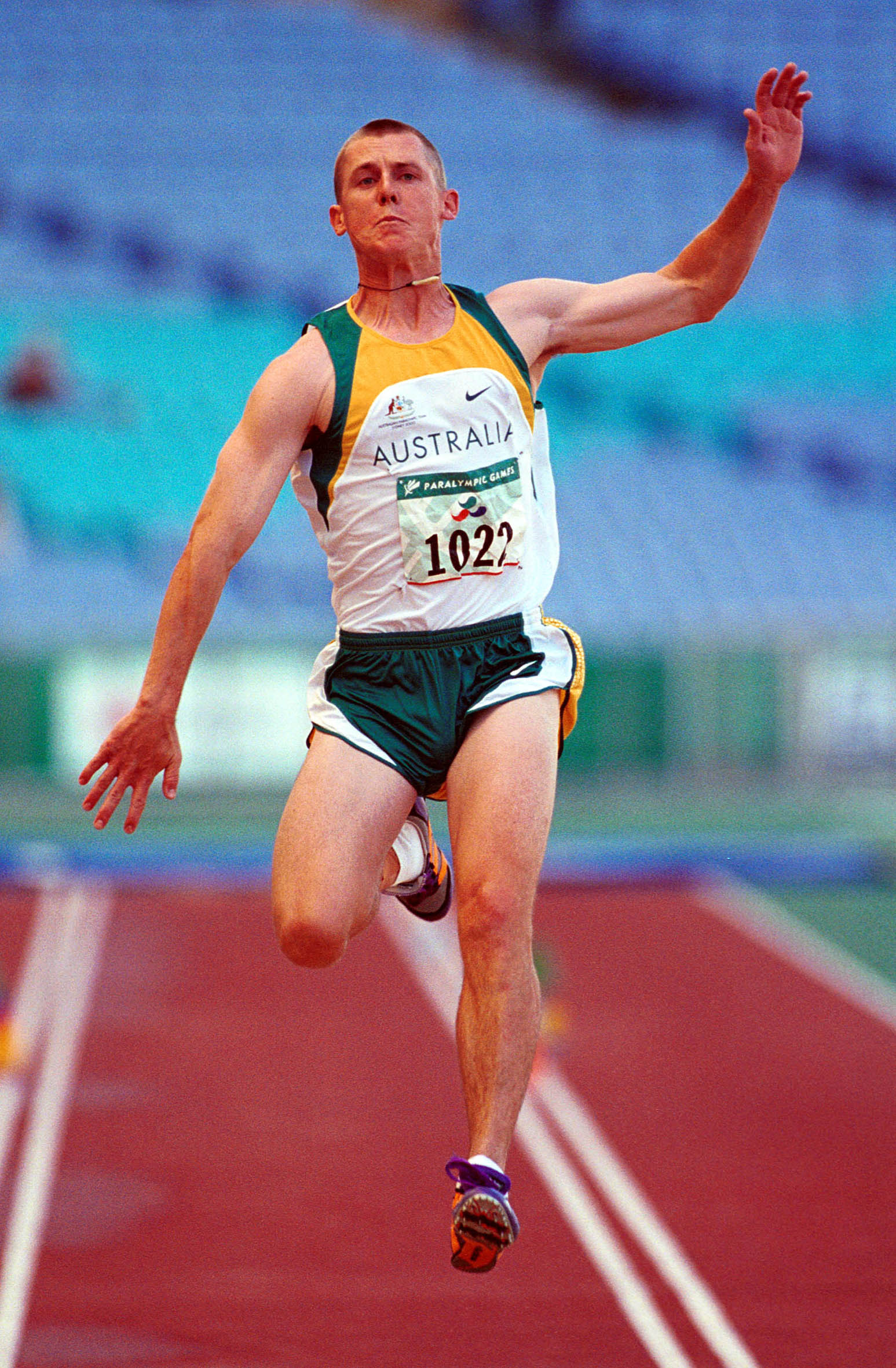
Action shot of Biddle during pentathlon competition at the 2000 Summer Paralympics

Anthony John Biddle OAM (born 18 June 1975) is an Australian Paralympic tandem cyclist and athlete. He was born in the New South Wales city of Gosford. He competed in athletics without winning any medals at the 1996 Atlanta Games and the 2000 Sydney Games. At the 2004 Athens Games, he switched to cycling and won a gold medal in the Men's 1 km Time Trial Tandem B1–3 event, for which he received a Medal of the Order of Australia, and a bronze medal in the Men's Sprint Tandem B1–3 event. Kial Stewart was his pilot for both events.
