= Kial Stewart =

Personal information
- Full name: Kial Douglas Stewart
- Nationality: Australia
- Born: 26 July 1983 (age 42) Canberra, Australian Capital Territory
Medal record
Cycling
Paralympic Games
Gold medal – first place	2004 Athens	Men's 1 km Time Trial Tandem B1–3
Bronze medal – third place	2004 Athens	Men's Sprint Tandem B1–3

Kial Douglas Stewart, OAM (born 26 July 1983) is an Australian Paralympic tandem cyclist, who was Anthony Biddle's pilot at the 2004 Athens Games. He was born in Canberra, Australian Capital Territory. At the games, he won a gold medal in the Men's 1 km Time Trial Tandem B1–3 event, for which he received a Medal of the Order of Australia, and a bronze medal in the Men's Sprint Tandem B1–3 event.
