= Najlah Al-Dayyeni =

Iraqi para table tennis player

Personal information
- Native name: نجلة عماد
- Born: 1 December 2004 (age 21)

Sport
- Sport: Table tennis
- Disability class: 6
Medal record
Women's para table tennis
Representing Iraq
Paralympic Games
Gold medal – first place	2024 Paris	Singles C6
Asian Para Games
Gold medal – first place	2022 Hangzhou	Singles C6
Asian Championships
Silver medal – second place	2019 Taichung	Singles C6

Najlah Imad Lafta Al-Dayyeni (Arabic: نجلة عماد) (born 1 December 2004) is an Iraqi para table tennis player. She competed at the 2020 and 2024 Summer Paralympics, winning gold in the women's class 6 event in 2024.

== Life ==
Najla Imad Lafteh Al-Dayyeni was born on December 1, 2004, in Diyala Governorate, central Iraq. At the age of three, she lost her right hand when her father, a member of the Iraqi army, was targeted in an attack on his car in Baquba, her hometown in Diyala Governorate, in 2008. She later continued her studies and athletic pursuits, excelling in tournaments and becoming a member of the national Paralympic football team. She participated in the Paralympic Committee's club championship, winning first place in Iraq.

She trained with one arm and then won first place in the Iraqi Table Tennis Championship (for people with disabilities) while using a wheelchair. She achieved this despite being the youngest participant, contributing to the national team's success.

After winning third place in the 2018 Thailand International Championship (for people with disabilities), Samir Al-Kurdi, president of the Iraqi Paralympic Table Tennis Federation, facilitated her transition to playing with prosthetic limbs.
