= Abebe Fekadu =

Ethiopian Australian powerlifter

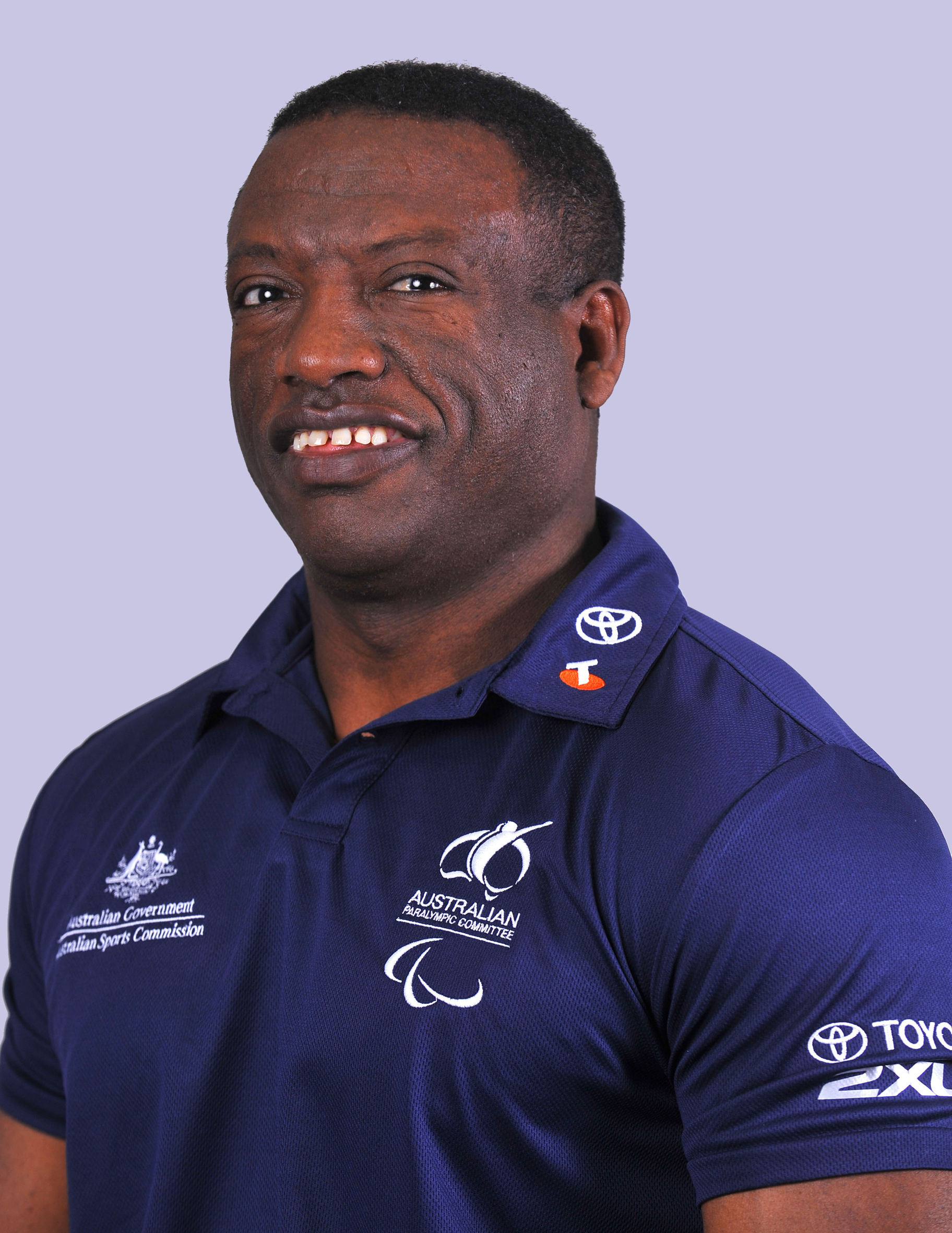
- 2012 Australian Paralympic team portrait of Fekadu

Personal information
- Nickname: Abba
- Nationality: Australian
- Born: 20 April 1970 (age 56) Mekane Yesus, Gondar Province, Ethiopian Empire (present-day Ethiopia)

Sport
- Country: Australia
- Sport: Powerlifting
- Event: men's 56 kilograms

Abebe Fekadu (born 20 April 1970) is an Ethiopian Australian powerlifter. He competed at the 2008 Summer Paralympics, where he finished tenth. He was selected to represent Australia at the 2012 Summer Paralympics in powerlifting. He did not medal at the 2012 Games.

== Personal ==
Nicknamed Abba, Fekadu was born on 20 April 1970 in [bahir dar], Ethiopia. The Ethiopian junta executed his father around 1977, when Fekadu was about eight years old. In response to that, he joined the secret anti-government, pro-democracy movement in Ethiopia. The government did not look kindly on his activities. One day in 1997 near Gonder, while trying to avoid an arrest, he was involved in a police chase that resulted in a serious car accident that left him a paraplegic. He was initially treated by a local medicine man. He left Ethiopia for Italy in order to receive treatment, choosing Italy because his brother was living there. He moved to Australia within two years of moving to Italy because his sister was living in the country. He was initially a refugee and detained by the Australian government.

In 2007, Fekadu became an Australian citizen. He resides in Queensland as of 2012.

== Powerlifting ==
Fekadu is a powerlifter. He started powerlifting in 2002 after meeting Ramon Epstein while at a gym in Brisbane. His first competition lift weight was 97 kilograms (214 lb).

In 2004, Fekadu was the Australian national champion in the men's 56 kilograms event. He continued to hold the title in 2005, 2006 and 2007. In 2007, he competed in the Asian Paralympics Committee Powerlifting Cup in Kuala Lumpur, where he earned a silver medal. That year, he also represented Australia at the Arafura Games, where he earned a gold medal while lifting 157 kilograms (346 lb). He competed in the 2008 Summer Paralympics in the men's 56 kilograms event, where he finished tenth overall. Going into the Paralympics, his personal best lift was 160 kilograms. Members of the Ethiopian Paralympic team met him and shook his hand at the Paralympics dining hall during the 2008 Games.

Fekadu was selected to represent Australia at the 2012 Summer Paralympics in powerlifting in the Under 56 kg event but did not medal.
