= Darren Gardiner =

Australian Paralympic powerlifter

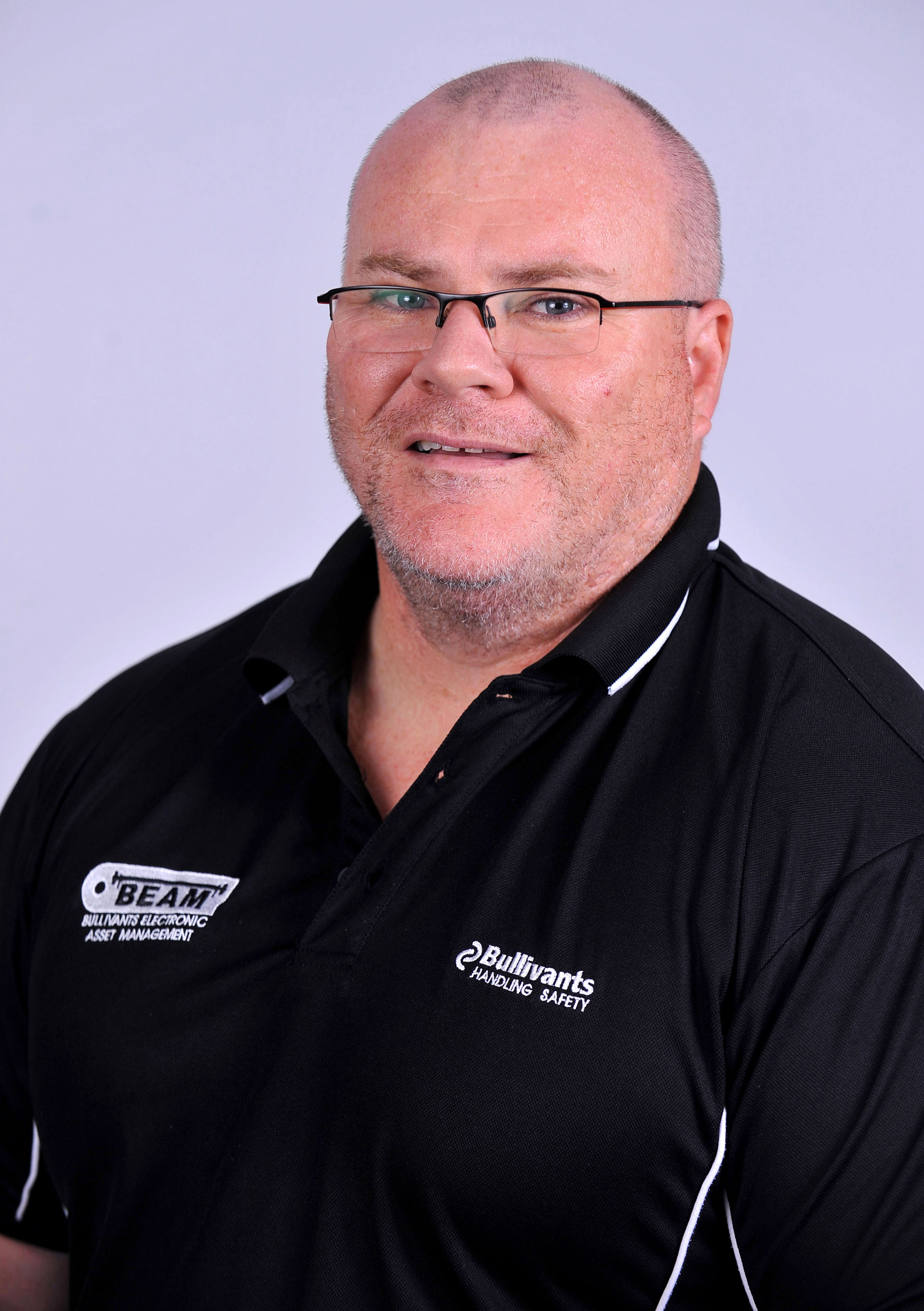
- 2012 Australian Paralympic team portrait of Gardiner

Personal information
- Nationality: Australia
- Born: 19 November 1969 (age 56) Brisbane, Australia
- Weight: 125 kg (276 lb)
Medal record
Powerlifting
Paralympic Games
Silver medal – second place	2004 Athens	Men's Over 100 kg
Silver medal – second place	2008 Beijing	Men's Over 100 kg
Commonwealth Games
Bronze medal – third place	2006 Melbourne	Men's Open EAD

Darren Gardiner (born 19 November 1969) is an Australian Paralympic powerlifter. He has won two Paralympic silver medals in the Men's Over 100 kg powerlifting event. He did not medal at the 2012 Games.

== Personal ==
Gardiner was born on 19 November 1969. In 1994, at the age of 24, his left leg was amputated below the knee due to cancer. He works as a sales manager. He moved from Brisbane to Perth in 2006. He weighs 125 kilograms (276 lb). Gardiner is also known by the nickname of 'The Bear'. Gardiner was given this nickname because of his unusual pre-lift behaviour which sees him roar like a bear.

== Powerlifting ==
Gardiner started powerlifting in 1995, and first represented Australia in 1998. He competes in the Over 100 kg men division. He has had the nickname "the bear" since 1997 because of the loud roaring noise he makes during competition. As of October 2011, he is ranked second in the world. As of May 2011, his personal best lift is 235 kg.

He competed at the 2000 Sydney Paralympics but did not win a medal. At the 2004 Athens Games, he won a silver medal in the Men's Over 100 kg event, when he lifted 227.5 kg. He repeated his silver medal performance in the same event at the 2008 Summer Paralympics.

In 2005, he competed at the Trafalgar event in Melbourne, where he won a bronze medal in the EAD category for powerlifting with a lift of 227.5 kilograms (502 lb).

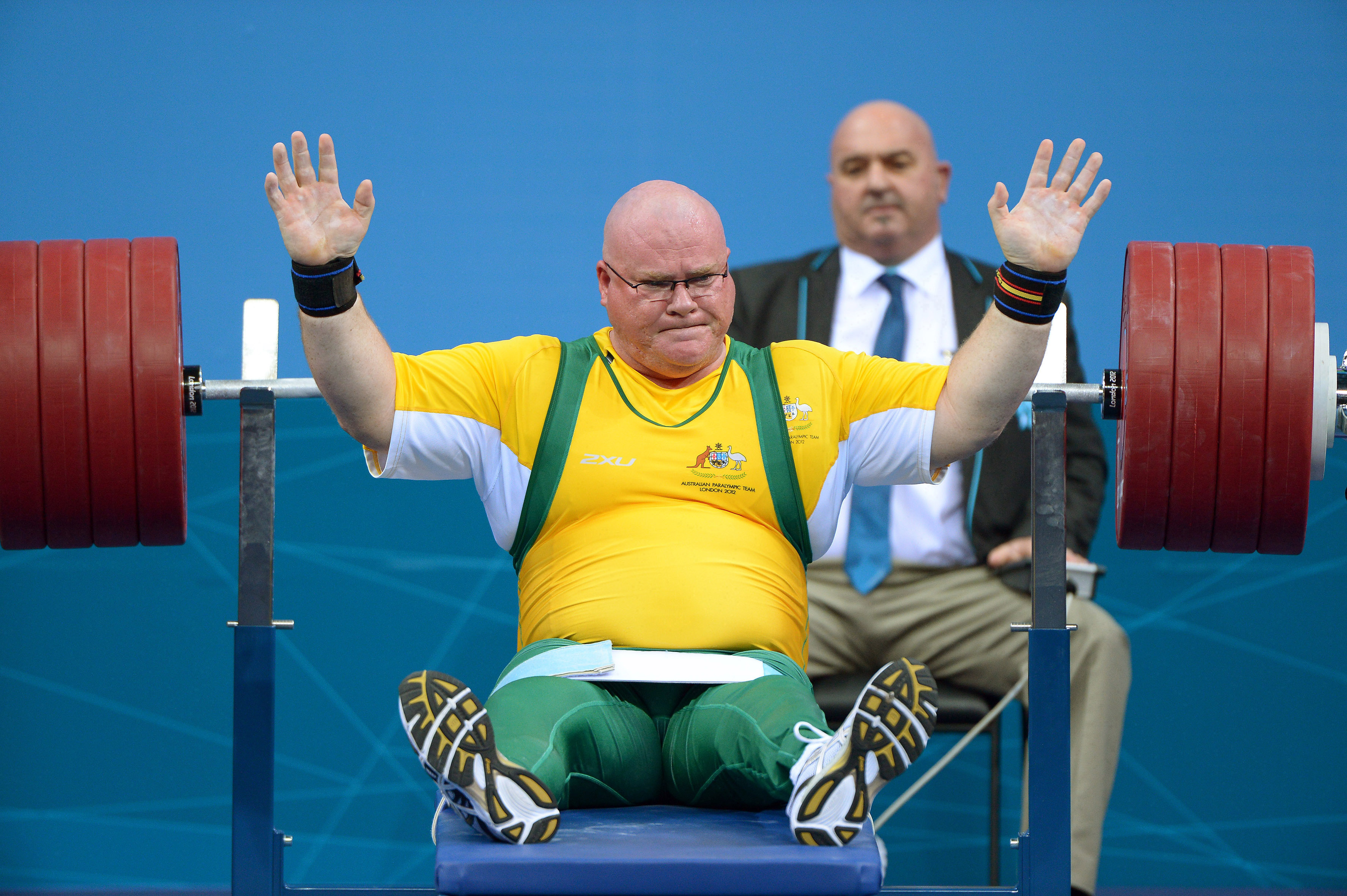
Gardiner at the 2012 London Paralympics

He has competed at several other events outside the Paralympics. In 2006, he finished second at the World Championships. That year, he took a bronze at the 2006 Melbourne Commonwealth Games. He won a silver medal in 2007 at the European Open. He did not compete for most of 2010 due to injury. At the 2011 Oceania Paralympic Championships, part of the Arafura Games, he finished first with a score of 230, 70 more than second place competitor Abebe Fekadu. He was selected to compete at the 2012 London Paralympics. He did not medal at the 2012 Games, missing out on a bronze medal by 1 kg. His retirement was announced in December 2012. Darren's retirement marked the end of his successful 15-year career.
