= Rasool Mohsin =

Iraqi Paralympic powerlifter

Personal information
- Born: November 17, 1987 (age 38) Baghdad, Iraq

Sport
- Country: Iraq
- Sport: Paralympic powerlifting
Medal record
Paralympic Games
Silver medal – second place	2008 Beijing	56 kg
Silver medal – second place	2016 Rio de Janeiro	72 kg
Bronze medal – third place	2024 Paris	80 kg
World Championships
Silver medal – second place	2010 Kuala Lumpur	56 kg
Asian Para Games
Gold medal – first place	2010 Guangzhou	56 kg
Gold medal – first place	2014 Incheon	65 kg
Silver medal – second place	2018 Jakarta	72 kg
Bronze medal – third place	2022 Hangzhou	80 kg

Rasool Mohsin (born 17 November 1987) is an Iraqi Paralympic powerlifter. He represented Iraq at the Summer Paralympics in 2008, 2016, 2020 and 2024. He won three medals: the silver medal in the men's 56 kg event in 2008, the silver medal in the men's 72 kg event in 2016 and the bronze medal in the men's 80 kg event in 2024.

== Career ==
He was also the flag bearer during the 2016 Summer Paralympics Parade of Nations. In 2021, he did not perform a successful lift in the men's 72 kg event at the 2020 Summer Paralympics in Tokyo, Japan.

In 2018, he won the gold medal in the men's 72 kg event at the Para Powerlifting Asia-Oceania Open Championships.
