= Faris Abed =

Iraqi Paralympic powerlifter

Personal information
- Full name: Faris Saadoon Abed Al-Ageeli
- Born: 20 May 1974 (age 52)

Sport
- Country: Iraq
- Sport: Paralympic powerlifting
Medal record
Paralympic Games
Gold medal – first place	2004 Athens	+100 kg
Silver medal – second place	2012 London	+100 kg
Bronze medal – third place	2020 Tokyo	+107 kg
Asian Para Games
Bronze medal – third place	2010 Guangzhou	+100 kg
Bronze medal – third place	2018 Jakarta	+107 kg

Faris Saadoon Abed Al-Ageeli (born 20 May 1974) is an Iraqi Paralympic powerlifter. He represented Iraq at the 2004 Summer Paralympics held in Athens, Greece and he won the gold medal in the men's +100 kg event.

He won the bronze medal in the men's +107 kg event at the 2020 Summer Paralympics held in Tokyo, Japan.
