= Australia at the 1996 Summer Paralympics =

- IPC code: AUS
- NPC: Australian Paralympic Committee
- Website: www.paralympic.org.au

in Atlanta
- Competitors: 166
- Flag bearer: Libby Kosmala (Opening) Priya Cooper
- Medals Ranked 2nd: Gold 42 Silver 37 Bronze 27 Total 106

Summer Paralympics appearances (overview)
- 1960; 1964; 1968; 1972; 1976; 1980; 1984; 1988; 1992; 1996; 2000; 2004; 2008; 2012; 2016; 2020; 2024

The 1996 Summer Paralympics were held in the United States city of Atlanta. Australia competed in 13 of the 17 sports, winning medals in 10 of those sports. At the 1996 Summer Paralympics, Australia had the second highest medal tally of any country competing. It won 42 gold, 37 silver and 27 bronze medals. It surpassed the 24 gold medals that Australia won at the 1992 Paralympics. The sports of athletics, swimming and cycling provided Australia with the majority of its medals.

== Background ==
In September 1993 the IOC announced that Sydney was the winning bid for the 2000 Summer Olympics, and the International Paralympic Committee announced Sydney would also be the host of the 2000 Summer Paralympics. This led to the Australian Government establishing the Olympic Athlete Program (OAP), funded and supported through the Australian Sports Commission, to prepare Australia's competitors for these games.

The Australian Paralympic Federation (APF) started receiving money from the OAP in October 1994, leading to the establishment of the Paralympic Preparation Program (PPP), with a full-time staff member – Jenni Banks – to develop and implement the program. The increased funding was used to contract more experienced coaches, arrange international tours for teams, run training camps and acclimatisation programs and purchase performance improving suits and equipment.

== Opening ceremony ==
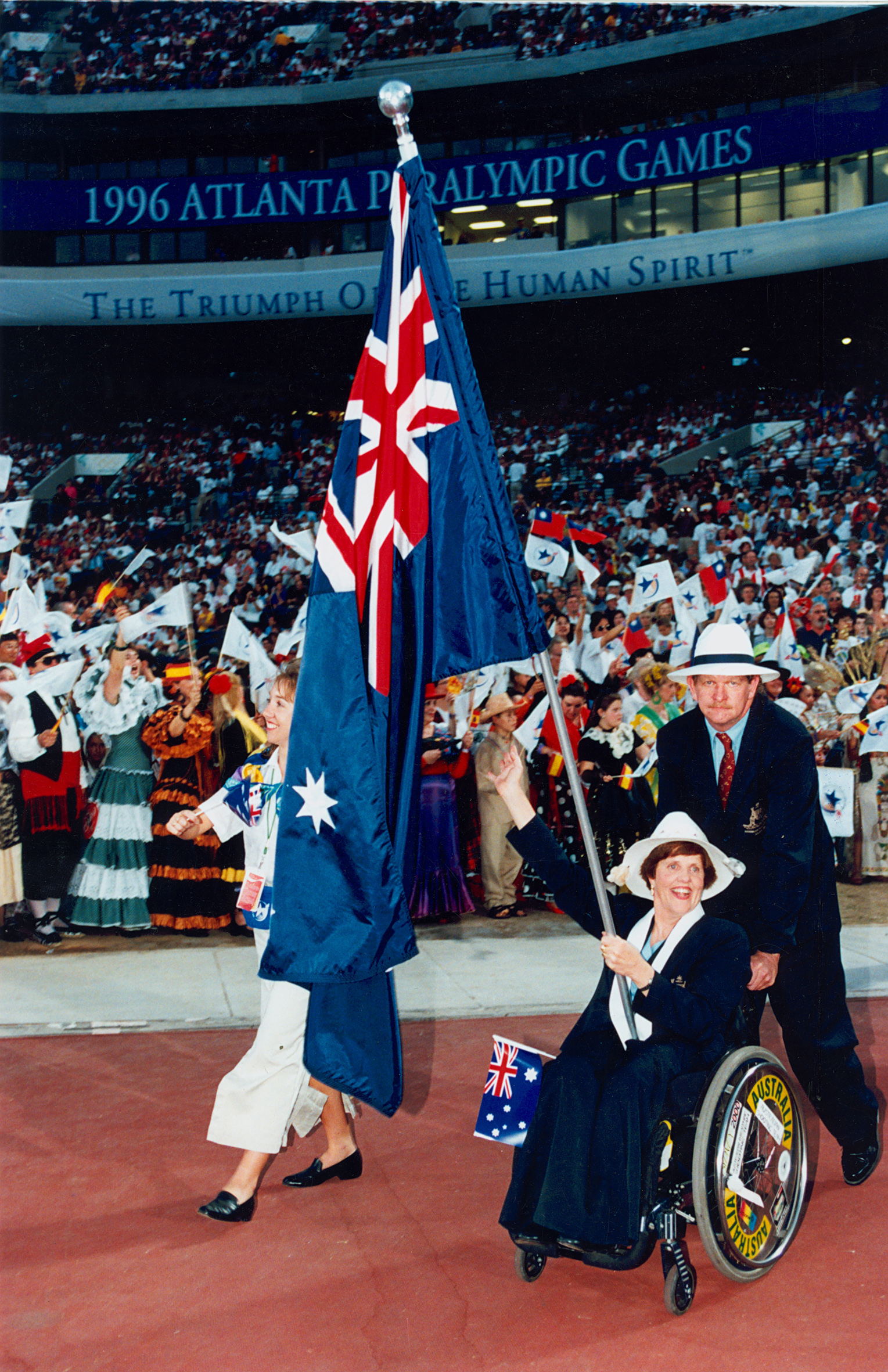
Atlanta 1996 Opening Ceremony Libby Kosmala (SA)

The opening ceremony saw a large explosion of colour, introducing 104 nations across 20 sports, totalling 3529 athletes. Australia was represented by 166 competitors. The opening ceremony saw the mascot (Blaze) flown proudly, signifying strength and survival.

There was a very strict and large security presence with the Centennial Olympic Park bombing at the Olympic Games just a month earlier.

Libby Kosmala was the flag bearer at the opening ceremony, wheeled by the basketball wheelchair mechanic Graham Gould. Libby has represented Australia at 12 Paralympic games in shooting, amassing 13 medals, 9 of which are gold.

== Team ==
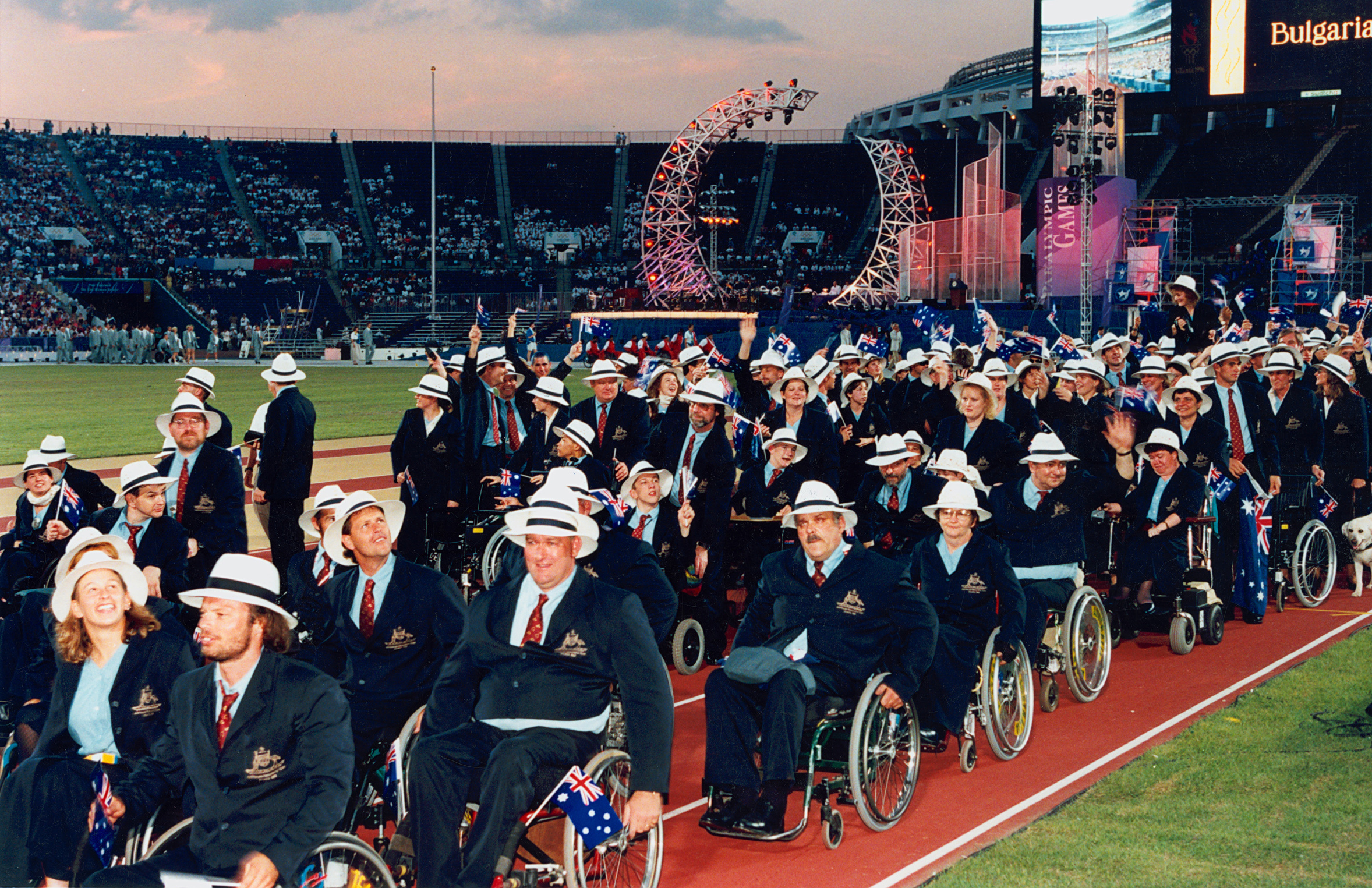
Australian athletes during the parade of athletes at opening ceremony of the 1996 Atlanta Paralympic Games

The Australian team consisted of 166 athletes. This was much smaller than other countries such as the US, Germany, Britain and Spain. The Australian Sports Commission provided financial support to the Australian Paralympic Federation to make it possible for all athletes to travel to the games. The team mascot, Banjo, was unveiled in May. The Chef de Mission was George Dunstan and the flag bearer at the opening ceremony was Libby Kosmala.

The Team Headquarters staff were: George Dunstan (Chef de Mission), Paul Bird, Michael Godfrey-Roberts, Tony de Leede, Susan Mathew, Cornelis van Eldik, Jenny Banks, Dawn Fraser, Peter Kelly, John Sherwell
Sports Medicine and Sports Science staff: Dr Susan White (Director), Norma Beer, Joanne Sayers, Jane Buckley, Donald Perriman, Barbara Denson, Greg Ungerer, Alan Thomas, Jo-anne Hare
Personal Care Attendants: Craig Jarvis, Trevor Goddard, Andre Juricich, Rod Stubbs, Joan Stevens, Joanne Titterton, Don Blackman, Jodie Worrall, Patricia Bignall .

Some States and Territories held official farewell ceremonies for their local athletes competing at the Paralympics. In Canberra, the athletes were officially sent off at a meeting of the Legislative Assembly during the last week of July.

== Medalists ==
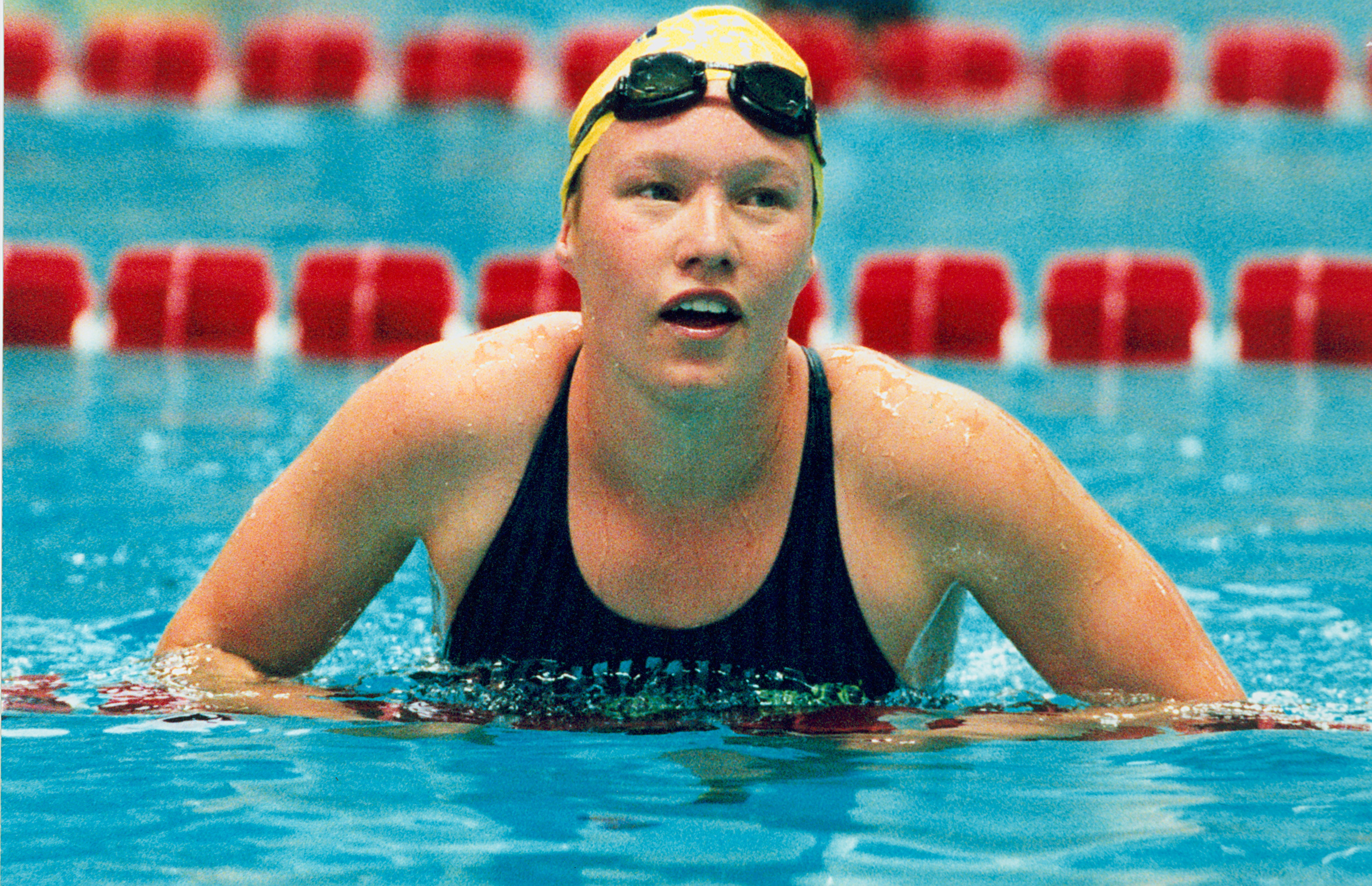
Atlanta 1996 - Melissa Carlton

Medal	Name	Sport	Event
Gold	Lachlan Jones	Athletics	Men's 100 m T32
Gold	John Lindsay	Athletics	Men's 100 m T52
Gold	David Evans	Athletics	Men's 1500 m T44–46
Gold	Fabian Blattman	Athletics	Men's 1500 m T50
Gold	Tim Matthews, Bradley Thomas, Neil Fuller, David Evans	Athletics	Men's 4 × 100 m relay T42–46
Gold	Darren Thrupp	Athletics	Men's Long jump F34–37
Gold	Damien Burroughs	Athletics	Men's Discus F36
Gold	Brian Harvey	Athletics	Men's Javelin F34/37
Gold	Hamish MacDonald	Athletics	Men's Shot put F32–33
Gold	Bruce Wallrodt	Athletics	Men's Shot put F53
Gold	Katrina Webb	Athletics	Women's 100 m T36–37
Gold	Katrina Webb	Athletics	Women's 200 m T34–37
Gold	Sharon Rackham	Athletics	Women's 200 m MH
Gold	Amy Winters	Athletics	Women's 200 m T42–46
Gold	Louise Sauvage	Athletics	Women's 400 m T53
Gold	Louise Sauvage	Athletics	Women's 800 m T53
Gold	Louise Sauvage	Athletics	Women's 1500 m T52–53
Gold	Louise Sauvage	Athletics	Women's 5000 m T52–53
Gold	Lisa Llorens	Athletics	Women's Long jump MH
Gold	Christopher Scott	Cycling	Mixed 5000 m time trial bicycle CP4
Gold	Peter Homann	Cycling	Mixed 20k bicycle CP4
Gold	Kerry Golding, Kieran Modra	Cycling	Mixed 200 m sprint tandem open
Gold	Sandra Smith, Teresa Poole	Cycling	Women's time trial tandem open
Gold	Sandra Smith, Teresa Poole	Cycling	Women's individual pursuit tandem open
Gold	Anthony Clarke	Judo	Men's 95 kg
Gold	Brendan Burkett	Swimming	Men's 50 m freestyle S9
Gold	Kingsley Bugarin	Swimming	Men's 100 m breaststroke B2
Gold	Kingsley Bugarin	Swimming	Men's 200 m breaststroke B2
Gold	Kingsley Bugarin	Swimming	Men's 200 m medley B2
Gold	Jeff Hardy	Swimming	Men's 100 m butterfly B2
Gold	Jeff Hardy	Swimming	Men's 400 m freestyle B2
Gold	Priya Cooper	Swimming	Women's 100 m backstroke S8
Gold	Priya Cooper	Swimming	Women's 200 m medley SM8
Gold	Priya Cooper	Swimming	Women's 100 m freestyle S8
Gold	Priya Cooper	Swimming	Women's 400 m freestyle S8
Gold	Tracey Cross	Swimming	Women's 100 m butterfly B1
Gold	Tracey Cross	Swimming	Women's 200 m medley B1
Gold	Gemma Dashwood	Swimming	Women's 100 m butterfly S10
Gold	Gemma Dashwood	Swimming	Women's 400 m freestyle S10
Gold	Melissa Carlton	Swimming	Women's 400 m freestyle S9
Gold	Melissa Carlton, Priya Cooper, Janelle Falzon, Gemma Dashwood	Swimming	Women's 400 m freestyle S9
Gold	Australia men's national wheelchair basketball team: Troy Andrews; Robert "Sandy" Blythe; Orfeo Cecconato; Benjamin Cox; Stuart Ewin; David Gould; Gerry Hewson, Timothy Maloney; Nick Morris; Richard Oliver; Troy Sachs; David Selby	Wheelchair Basketball	Men's tournament
Silver	Jaime Romaguera	Athletics	Men's 100 m T34
Silver	Neil Fuller	Athletics	Men's 100 m T43–44
Silver	Neil Fuller	Athletics	Men's 200 m T43–44
Silver	John Lindsay	Athletics	Men's 200 m T52
Silver	David Evans	Athletics	Men's 800 m T44–46
Silver	Fabian Blattman	Athletics	Men's 800 m T50
Silver	Greg Smith	Athletics	Men's 5000 m T51
Silver	Russell Short	Athletics	Men's Discus F12
Silver	Russell Short	Athletics	Men's Shot put F12
Silver	Kerrod McGregor	Athletics	Men's Pentathlon P42
Silver	Katrina Webb	Athletics	Women's Long jump F34–37
Silver	Jodi Willis-Roberts	Athletics	Women's Shot put F10–11
Silver	Peter Homann	Cycling	Mixed 5000 m time trial bicycle CP4
Silver	Christopher Scott	Cycling	Mixed 20k bicycle CP4
Silver	Eddy Hollands, Paul Clohessy	Cycling	Men's individual pursuit tandem open
Silver	Matthew Gray	Cycling	Mixed omnium LC1
Silver	Paul Lake	Cycling	Mixed omnium LC2
Silver	June Clark	Lawn bowls	Women's Singles LB3-5
Silver	Brian McNicholl	Powerlifting	Men's Up To 90 kg
Silver	James Nomarhas	Shooting	Mixed sport pistol SH1
Silver	Grant Fitzpatrick	Swimming	Men's 50 m freestyle MH
Silver	Grant Fitzpatrick	Swimming	Men's 100 m freestyle MH
Silver	Kingsley Bugarin	Swimming	Men's 100 m butterfly B2
Silver	Kingsley Bugarin	Swimming	Men's 100 m freestyle B2
Silver	Scott Brockenshire, Brendan Burkett, Paul Gockel, Dominic Collins, Cameron de Burgh	Swimming	Men's 4 × 100 m freestyle S7–10
Silver	Tracey Cross	Swimming	Women's 50 m freestyle B1
Silver	Judith Young	Swimming	Women's 50 m freestyle S10
Silver	Judith Young	Swimming	Women's 100 m breaststroke SB10
Silver	Judith Young	Swimming	Women's 100 m butterfly S10
Silver	Tracey Oliver	Swimming	Women's 50 m freestyle S7
Silver	Priya Cooper	Swimming	Women's 50 m freestyle S8
Silver	Melissa Carlton	Swimming	Women's 100 m butterfly S9
Silver	Melissa Carlton	Swimming	Women's 100 m freestyle S9
Silver	Gemma Dashwood	Swimming	Women's 100 m freestyle S10
Silver	Gemma Dashwood	Swimming	Women's 200 m medley SM10
Silver	Carla Sullivan	Swimming	Women's 100 m freestyle MH
Silver	David Hall, Mick Connell	Wheelchair tennis	Men's doubles
Bronze	Leroi Court	Athletics	Men's 100 m T12
Bronze	Bradley Thomas	Athletics	Men's 100 m T43–44
Bronze	Darren Thrupp	Athletics	Men's 200 m T37
Bronze	John Lindsay	Athletics	Men's 400 m T52
Bronze	Bradley Thomas	Athletics	Men's Long jump F44
Bronze	Stephen Eaton	Athletics	Men's Discus F32–33
Bronze	John Eden	Athletics	Men's Discus F42
Bronze	Bruce Wallrodt	Athletics	Men's Javelin F53
Bronze	Terry Giddy	Athletics	Men's Shot put F55
Bronze	Alison Quinn	Athletics	Women's 100 m T36–37
Bronze	Amy Winters	Athletics	Women's 100 m T42–46
Bronze	Lisa Llorens	Athletics	Women's 200 m MH
Bronze	Kris Bignall, Tu Huyhn	Boccia	Pairs C1 wad
Bronze	Pauline Cahill	Lawn bowls	Women's Singles LB3-5
Bronze	Scott Brockenshire	Swimming	Men's 50 m freestyle S10
Bronze	Scott Brockenshire	Swimming	Men's 100 m butterfly S10
Bronze	Jeff Hardy	Swimming	Men's 200 m medley B2
Bronze	Kingsley Bugarin	Swimming	Men's 400 m freestyle B2
Bronze	Elizabeth Wright	Swimming	Women's 50 m butterfly S6
Bronze	Karni Liddell	Swimming	Women's 50 m freestyle S6
Bronze	Judith Young	Swimming	Women's 100 m backstroke S10
Bronze	Janelle Falzon	Swimming	Women's 100 m backstroke S8
Bronze	Melissa Carlton	Swimming	Women's 100 m backstroke S9
Bronze	Priya Cooper	Swimming	Women's 100 m butterfly S8
Bronze	Petrea Barker	Swimming	Women's 100 m freestyle MH
Bronze	Janelle Falzon	Swimming	Women's 400 m freestyle S8
Bronze	David Hall	Wheelchair tennis	Men's singles

Medals by discipline
Discipline	Gold medal	Silver medal	Bronze medal	Total
Archery	0	0	0	0
Athletics	19	12	12	43
Wheelchair basketball	1	0	0	1
Boccia	0	0	1	1
Cycling	5	5	0	10
Equestrian	0	0	0	0
Wheelchair fencing	0	0	0	0
Football seven-a-side	0	0	0	0
Judo	1	0	0	1
Powerlifting	0	1	0	1
Lawn bowls	0	1	1	2
Shooting	0	1	0	1
Swimming	16	16	12	44
Table tennis	0	0	0	0
Volleyball	0	0	0	0
Wheelchair tennis	0	1	1	2
Total	42	37	27	106

== Events ==
=== Athletics ===
Australia represented by:
Men – Anthony Biddle, Fabian Blattman, Damien Burroughs, Geoffrey Clarke, Leroi Court, Mark Davies, Michael Dowling, Stephen Eaton, John Eden, Don Elgin, David Evans, Neil Fuller, Terry Giddy, David Goodman, Adrian Grogan, Brian Harvey, Lachlan Jones, John Lindsay, Hamish MacDonald, Tim Matthews, Kerrod McGregor, Paul Nunnari, Sam Rickard, Jaime Romaguera, Russell Short, Greg Smith, Bradley Thomas, Darren Thrupp, Bruce Wallrodt, Paul Wiggins, Matthew van Eldik
Women – Marsha Green, Lisa Llorens, Alison Quinn, Sharon Rackham, Louise Sauvage, Christie Skelton, Frances Stanley, Leana Viero, Katrina Webb, Jodi Willis-Roberts, Amy Winters
Coaches – Kathryn Lee (Head), Chris Nunn, Lyndall Warry, Andrew Dawes, Scott Goodman.

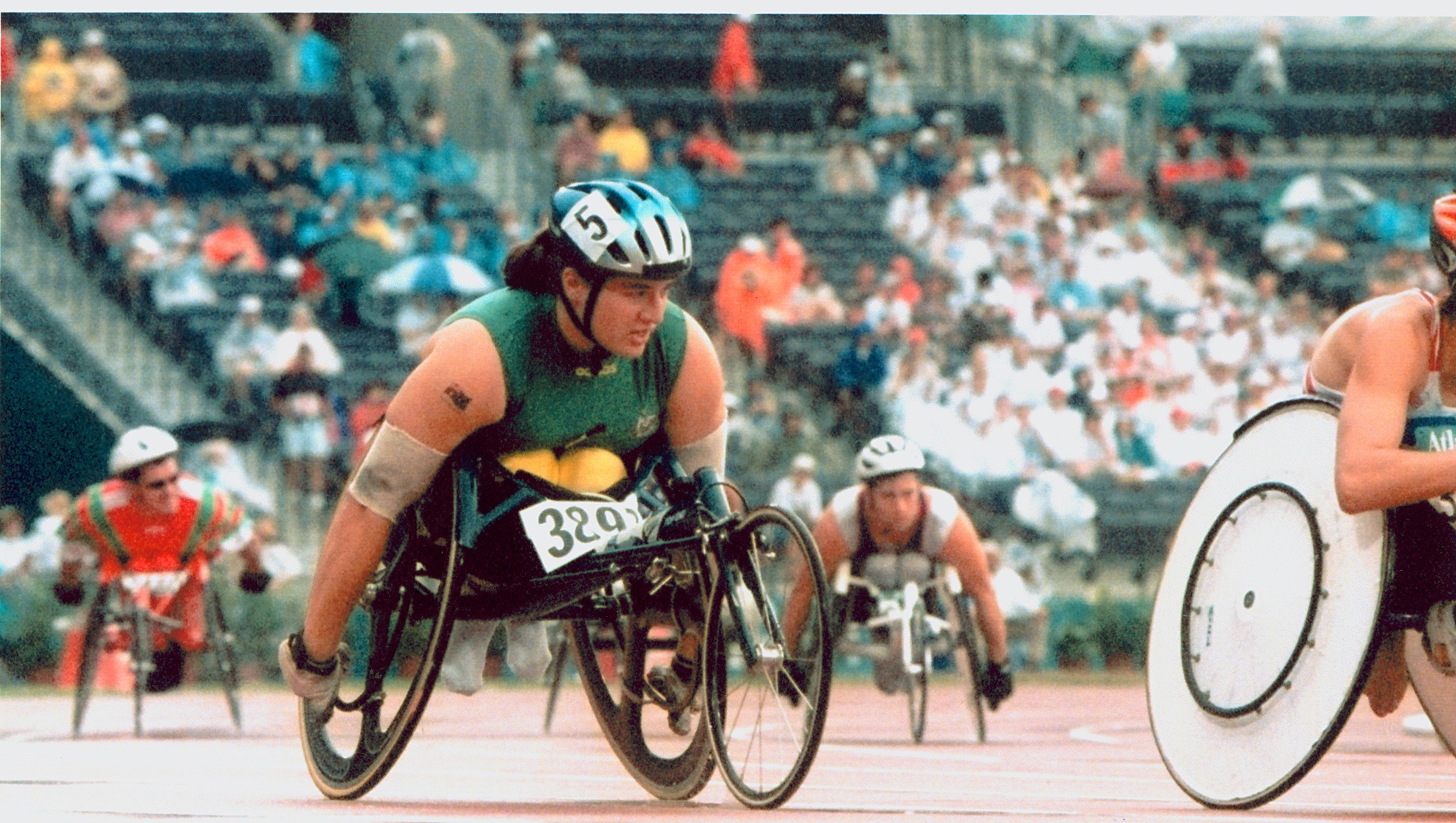
Atlanta 1996 - Louise Sauvage on the track.

Louise Sauvage, from Perth, won gold in the Women's 1,500 m T52-53 (time of 3:30.45, a world record), gold in the Women's 400 m T53, with a result of 54.96, a Paralympic record, gold in the Women's 5,000 m T52-53 time of 12:40.71, a world record, and a final gold in the Women's 800 m T53 (time of 1:52.80, a Paralympic record). Louise's world record in the 1500 m took 6 seconds off the previous record, and her record in the 5000 m took place only an hour after winning the 400 m.

David Evans earned gold in the Men's 1,500 m T44-46, with a result of 3:59.68, another gold (along with Tim Matthews, Bradley Thomas, and Neil Fuller) in the Men's 4 × 100 m Relay T42-46, with a team result of 45.40, a world record, and silver in the Men's 800 m T44-46, with a result of 1:55.81.

Fabian Blattman from New South Wales, won gold in the Men's 1500 m T50, with a result of 5:09.41, a Paralympic record, and silver in the Men's 800 m T50, with a result of 2:46.67.

Katrina Webb from South Australia, was 19 years old when the 1996 Games took place. In 1995 she had accepted a year-long netball scholarship at the Australian Institute of Sport, where she was diagnosed with cerebral palsy. People at the Australian Institute of Sport encouraged her to compete in the Paralympics in Atlanta, but Webb initially resisted because she did not view herself as disabled. She changed her mind and went on to win a gold medal in the 100 m sprint. Her gold medal was controversial in some Paralympic circles because many did not believe she was disabled enough. Webb won a silver medal in the long jump, with a distance of 4.46 metres (14.6 ft). This distance was 24 centimetres (9.4 in) better than her previous personal best.

Lisa Llorens from the Australian Capital Territory, won a gold and a bronze in track and field events.

Lachlan Jones from Melbourne Victoria, competed in the 100 m wheelchair race and won the gold medal. This came after two false starts and a protest in the medal race. Jones claims the two false starts were intentional on the part of his competitors in an attempt to distract him. The protests were dropped before they were formally considered by the judges. Jones had to compete against more able athletes in the 400 m race because there were not enough participants with cerebral palsy to have a separate competition class at the Games.

Brian Harvey won a gold medal in the cerebral palsy class of javelin with a distance of 34.7 metres (114 ft).

Darren Thrupp won a gold medal in the Men's Long Jump F34-37 with a distance of 5.74 metres (18.8 ft). Darren also won bronze in the Men's 200 m T37, with a result of 25.52 seconds.

=== Boccia ===
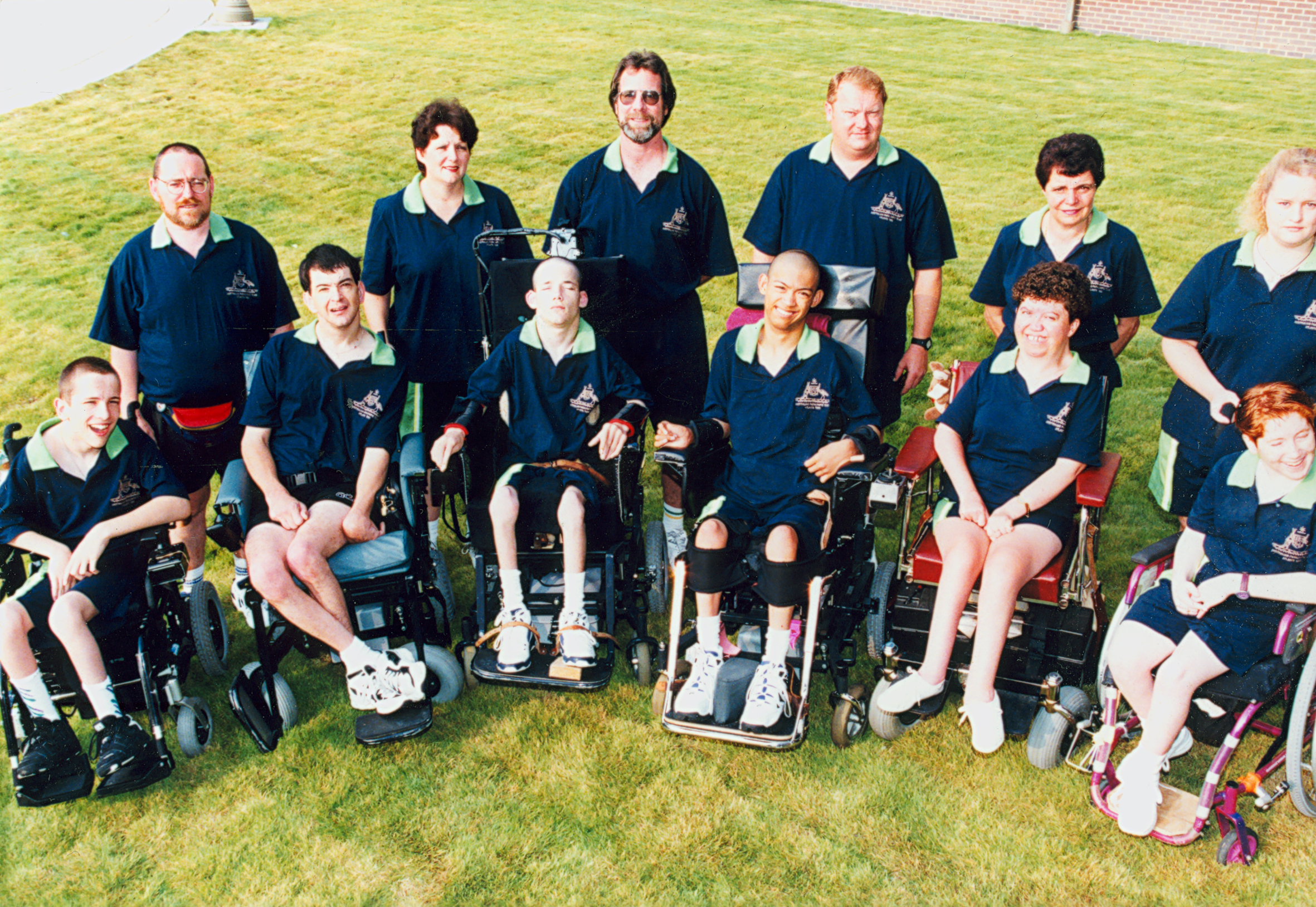
Australian Boccia team.

Australia represented by:
Men – Kris Bignall, Scott Elsworth, Tu Huyhn, John Richardson
Women – Lynette "Lyn" Coleman, Fiona Given
Coaches – Thomas Organ (Head), Ricky Grant
.

The 1996 result was the best ever for an Australian team in Boccia. The Australian team had six athletes who competed individually, as pairs and in a team event in the C1, C2 and C/WAD categories. Prior to the start of the Games, the team was ranked eleventh in the world. The team's fifth-place finish in the team event was the best the country had ever done in the event. The team was captained by Fiona Given.

The pairs C/WAD team of Kris Bignall and Tu Huyhn were ranked as the seventh best pair in the world prior to the start of the games. They surprised the world when they won a bronze medal after beating Spain and New Zealand in the preliminaries, and after beating an American pair in the bronze medal match. Their medal was the first medal Australia had won in this sport in international competition.

Kris Bignall also competed as an individual in the C1 WAD category. He made it to the medals play off stage, where he lost. Tu Huyhn also competed in the individual events in the C1 WAD category. He finished fifth in pool play and did not qualify for the medal play off stage. Lyn Coleman competed as an individual in the C1 category. She finished sixth overall. John Richardson also competed in the C1 individual event. He finished fifth in his pool and did not qualify for the medals playoffs.

Scott Elsworth competed as an individual in the C2 category. He finished sixth in his pool and did not qualify for the medal round. Fiona Given also competed in the C2 individual competition, finishing in fourth place in pool place and not qualifying for the medals.

=== Cycling ===
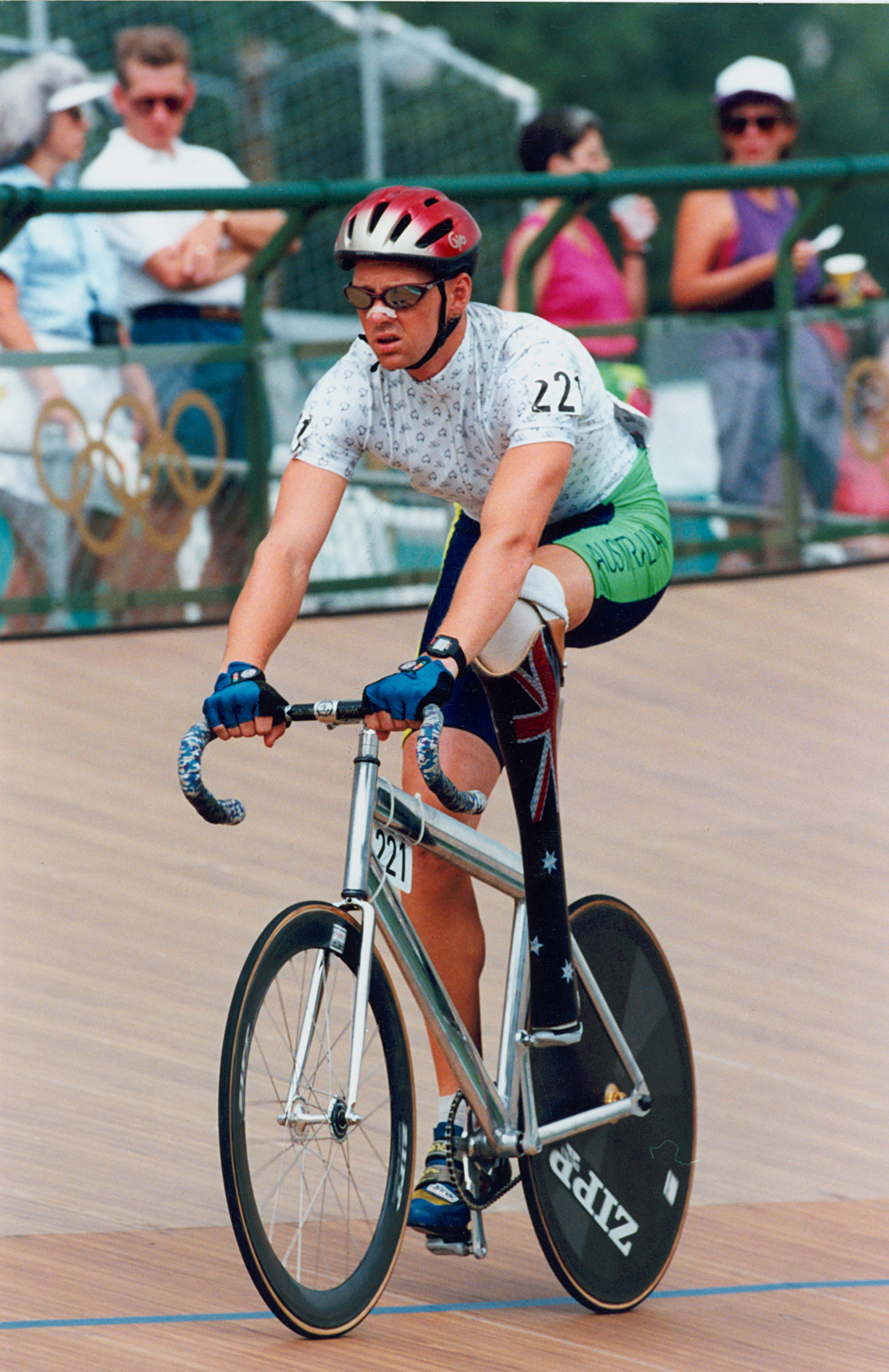
Silver medalist Paul Lake in the LC1 omnium event

Australia represented by:
Men – Paul Clohessy, Kerry Golding (Pilot for Kieran Modra)), Matthew Gray, Steve Gray (Pilot for Greg Madson), Eddie Hollands (Pilot for Paul Clohessy)), Peter Homann, Paul Lake, Paul Lamond (Pilot for Lyn Lepore), Gregory Madson, Kieran Modra, Christopher Scott
Women – Lyn Lepore, Teresa Poole, Sandra Smith (Pilot for Teresa Poole)
Coaches – Kenneth Norris (Head), David Woodhouse
.

Australian cyclists prepared for the Games and Atlanta's humid weather by undergoing acclimatisation training in Perth and Melbourne. Australian cyclists were also provided with racing suits by the International Wool Secretariat and CSIRO. These uniforms helped to minimise the impact of sweat on a cyclist's performance.

Kieran Modra is a South Australian blind cyclist. He competed in the 1996 Paralympics in the tandem event with pilot Kerry Golding. He won a gold medal in the 200m mixed tandem sprint race.

Tandem bike pairing Teresa Poole and Sandra Smith were ranked number one in the world prior to the start of the Games, and held the world record in the 1000 m event. Poole's disability is tunnel vision. They won gold in the 1000m women's tandem race, their first gold medal awarded at the Games

=== Equestrian ===
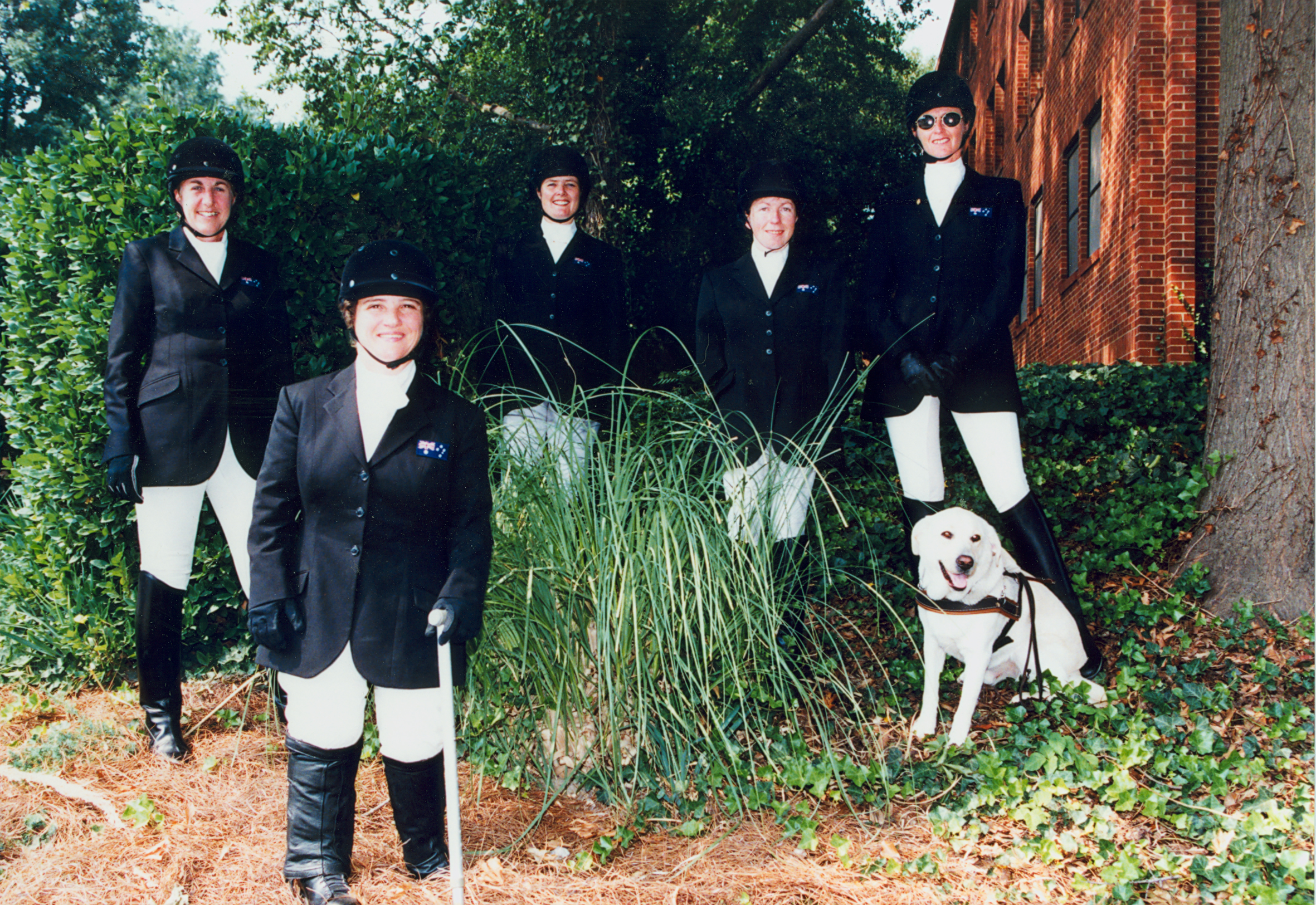
Australian Equestrian Team - Atlanta 1996

Australia represented by:
Women – Susan Haydon, Sharon Konemann, Sue Lee, Margaret Reynolds, Mandy Waalwyk
Coach – Mary Longden Officials – Sally Francis
.

Atlanta was the first Paralympic Games at which Australia entered an equestrian team. The Equestrian competition was divided into 9 events. Australia did not medal in any of them.

=== Goalball ===
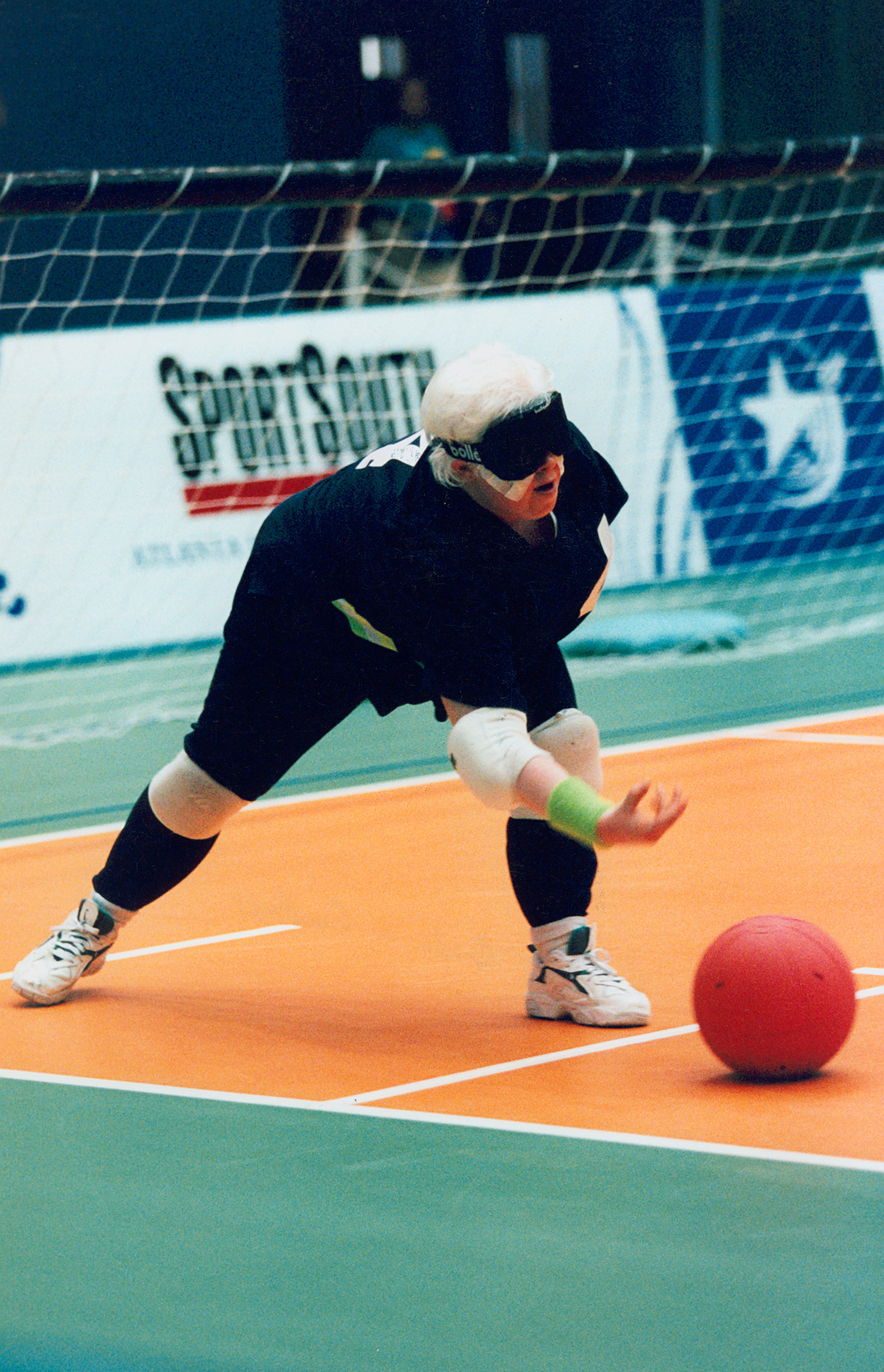
Goalballer Raelene Bocks (NSW) competes for Australia at the 1996 Summer Paralympics

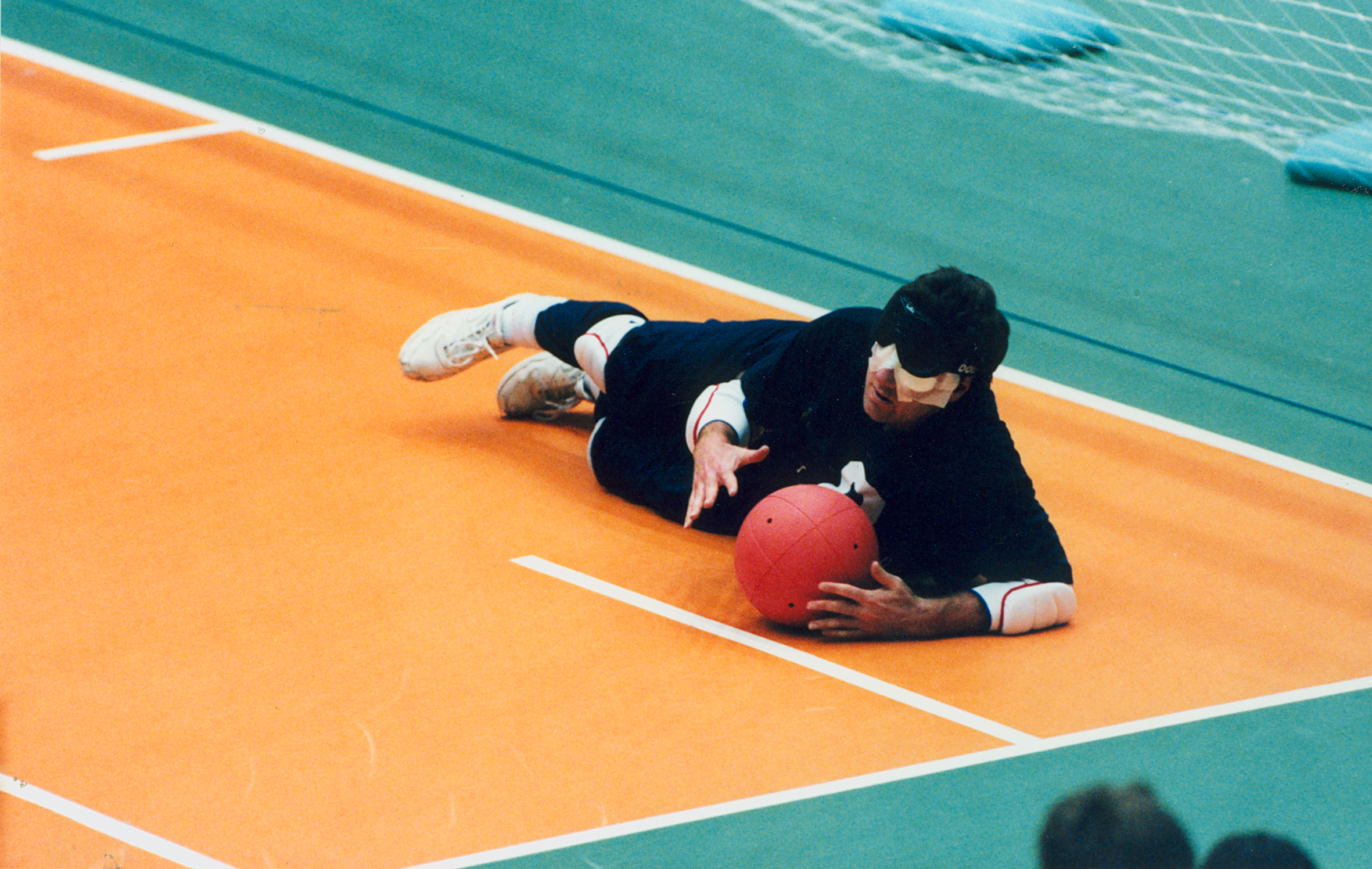
Men's goalball Atlanta Paralympics - Rob Crestani

Men Australia represented by:
Team – Robert Crestani, Kevin Frew, Colin George, Gerrard Gosens, Warren Lawton, Brett Scarr
Coach – Sam Theodore (Head), Heather Gossens (Assistant)
.

The Australian men finished fourth. This was the country's best finish in an international competition. The team had played a number of international matches and also had an extended raining camp in Australia prior to the start of the Games. The training camp included psychological preparations.

The star of the men's team was Robert Crestani. His ability to throw the ball and his offensive tactics helped the team remain competitive. Other key players for the team included Warren Lawton and Gerrard Gosens. These three players were on the court for almost the whole competition.

In pool play, they beat Italy 5–2, the Czech Republic 7–0, and the Netherlands 3–2. They drew with Germany 3–3 and Slovenia 4–4. In the Qualification round, they lost to Finland 1–4, drew with Spain 3–3 and lost to Canada 1–3. In the medal elimination round, they lost to Canada 2–3. In the bronze medal match, they lost to Spain 2–6.

Australia's win over Italy is important in the team's history because the Italian team was ranked number one in the world coming into the Paralympic Games.

Women
Australia represented by:
Team – Raelene Bocks, Sarah Kennedy, Rachel Lahl, Marilyn Mills, Jennette Saxberg, Robyn Stephens
Coaches – Terry Kenaghan (Head), Robert Apps (Assistant)

Unlike the men's team, the women's Australian team did not have as much experience as other teams in the Paralympic goalball competition. European teams had competed against each other in the lead up to the Games. This gave them an advantage as they knew their opponents' strengths and weaknesses.

The Australian women had several injuries during the Paralympics. Sarah Kennedy injured herself in training, which limited her mobility.

Australia lost all but one match. They lost to Spain 0–1, to Sweden 0–4, to Denmark 1–5, to Germany 0–2 and to the USA 0–3. Australia's sole victory came against Korea, where they won 2–0. Australia finished as the last team in the competition based on goals for and against as they had a record of 3–16. The 0–1 loss to Finland was considered impressive by goalball followers because Finland won a silver medal.

=== Judo ===
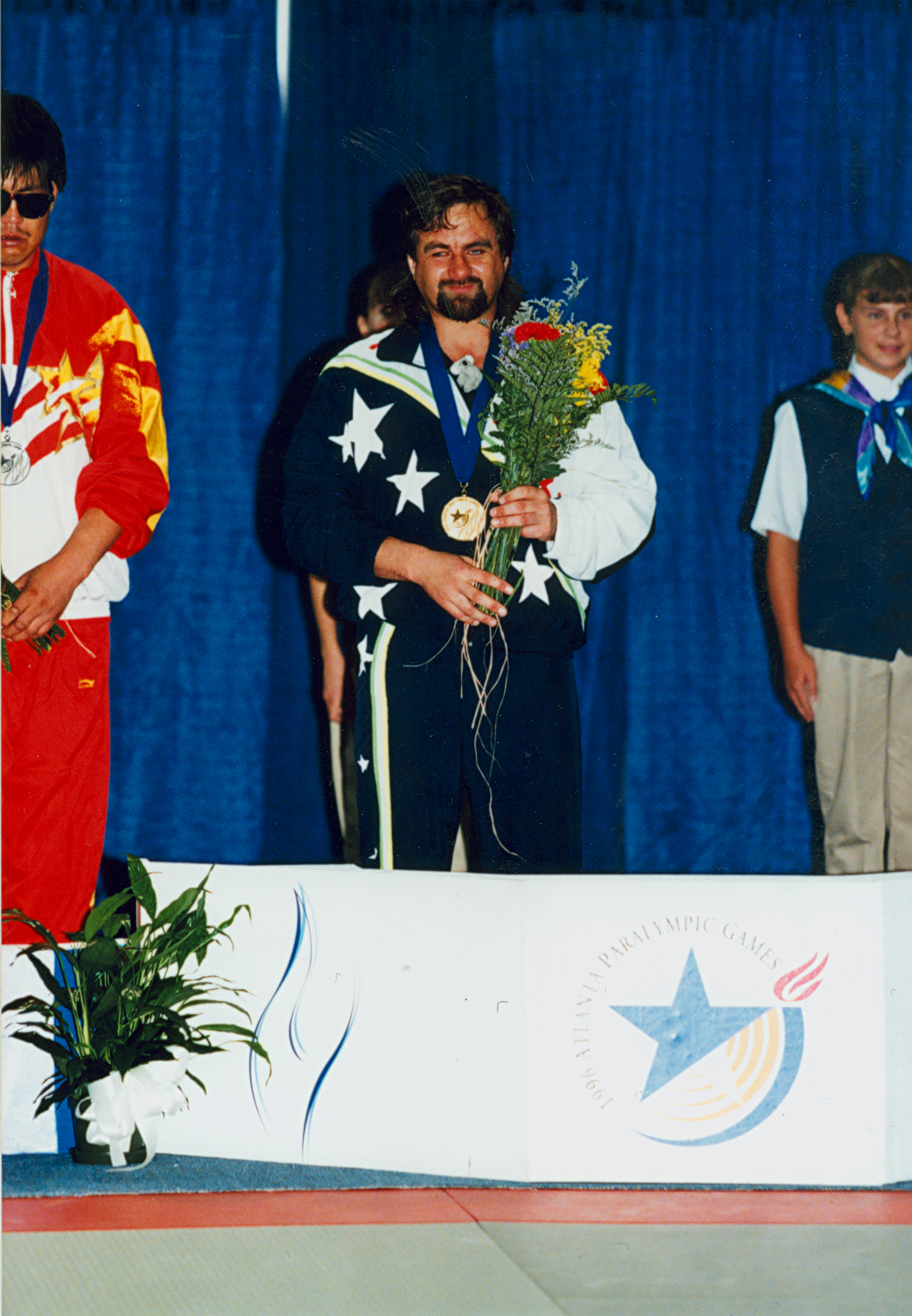
Anthony Clarke receiving his gold medal in 1996.

Australia represented by:
Men – Anthony Clarke Coach – Trevor Kschammer .

Australia sent one athlete to compete in judo: Anthony Clarke. He was coached by Trevor Kschammer. This was the only sport where Australia had a ratio of one athlete to one coach. Anthony Clarke won a gold medal, going undefeated. He beat Arlindo Tinoco of Brazil in 51 seconds, Fermin Campos Ariza of Spain in five minutes in the semifinal and beat Run Ming Men of China in the gold medal match in 35 seconds.

Anthony Clarke is Australia's first ever competitor to medal in Judo and continued on to compete for another 12 years before retiring in 2008.

Athlete	Event	1/8-Final	Quarterfinals	Semifinals	Final	
Athlete	Event	Opposition Result	Opposition Result	Opposition Result	Opposition Result	Rank
Anthony Clarke	Judo	bye	Arlindo Tinoco (BRA); W	Fermin Campos Ariza (ESP); W	Run Ming Men (CHN); W	Gold medal

=== Lawn bowls ===
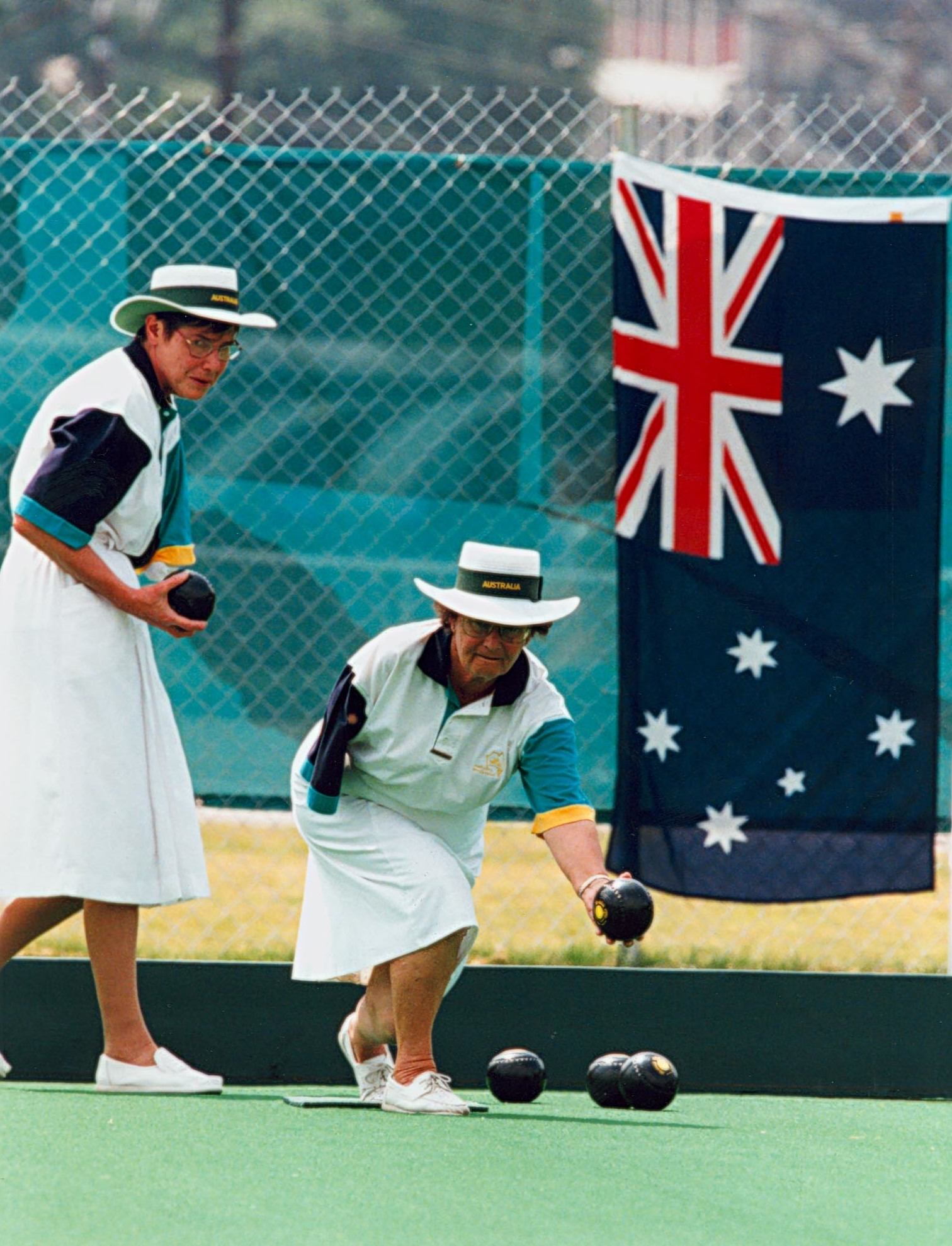
Pauline Cahill and Jonie Clark - Bowls

Australia represented by:
Men – John Forsberg, Neville Millington, Robert Tinker
Women – Pauline Cahill, June Clark
Coach – Graeme Clark
.

In preparation for the Games, the five bowlers competed in a tournament in South Africa. Pauline Cahill and June Clark both medalled with a bronze and silver respectively.

=== Powerlifting ===
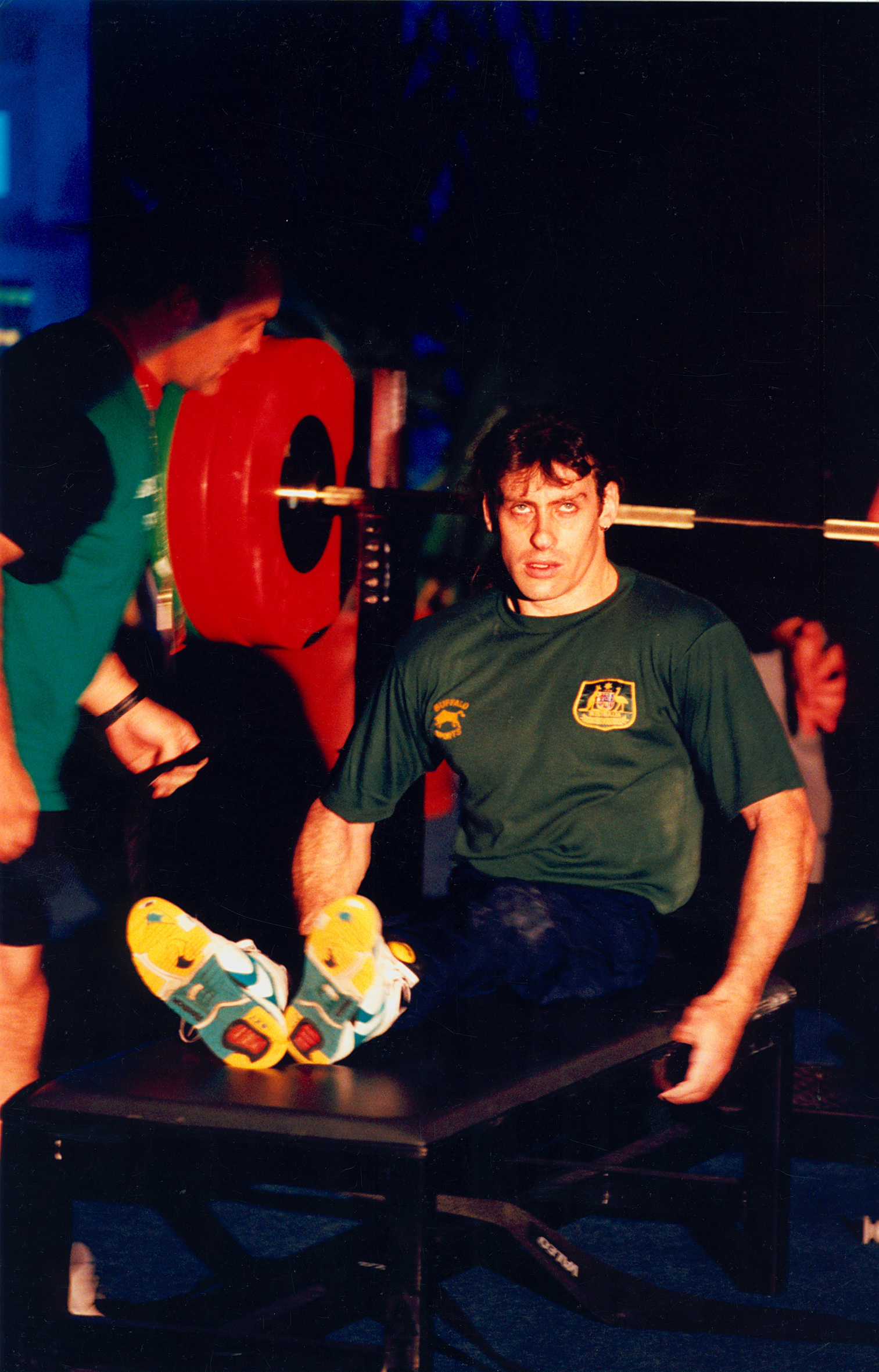
Richard Nicholson before his lift.

Men – Willem Bos, Michael Farrell, Brian McNicholl, Richard Nicholson
Coach – Blagoi Blagoev
.

Brian McNicholl won a silver medal in the up to 90 kg power lifting event.

=== Sailing ===
Sailing was incorporated as a demonstration sport in Atlanta and had only 1 event, the mixed crew boat or Skud18. The Skud18 has a male and female combination where the sailor with the highest level of disability steers the boat. Paralympic sailing is currently offered to those who have a physical disability or vision impairment.

=== Shooting ===
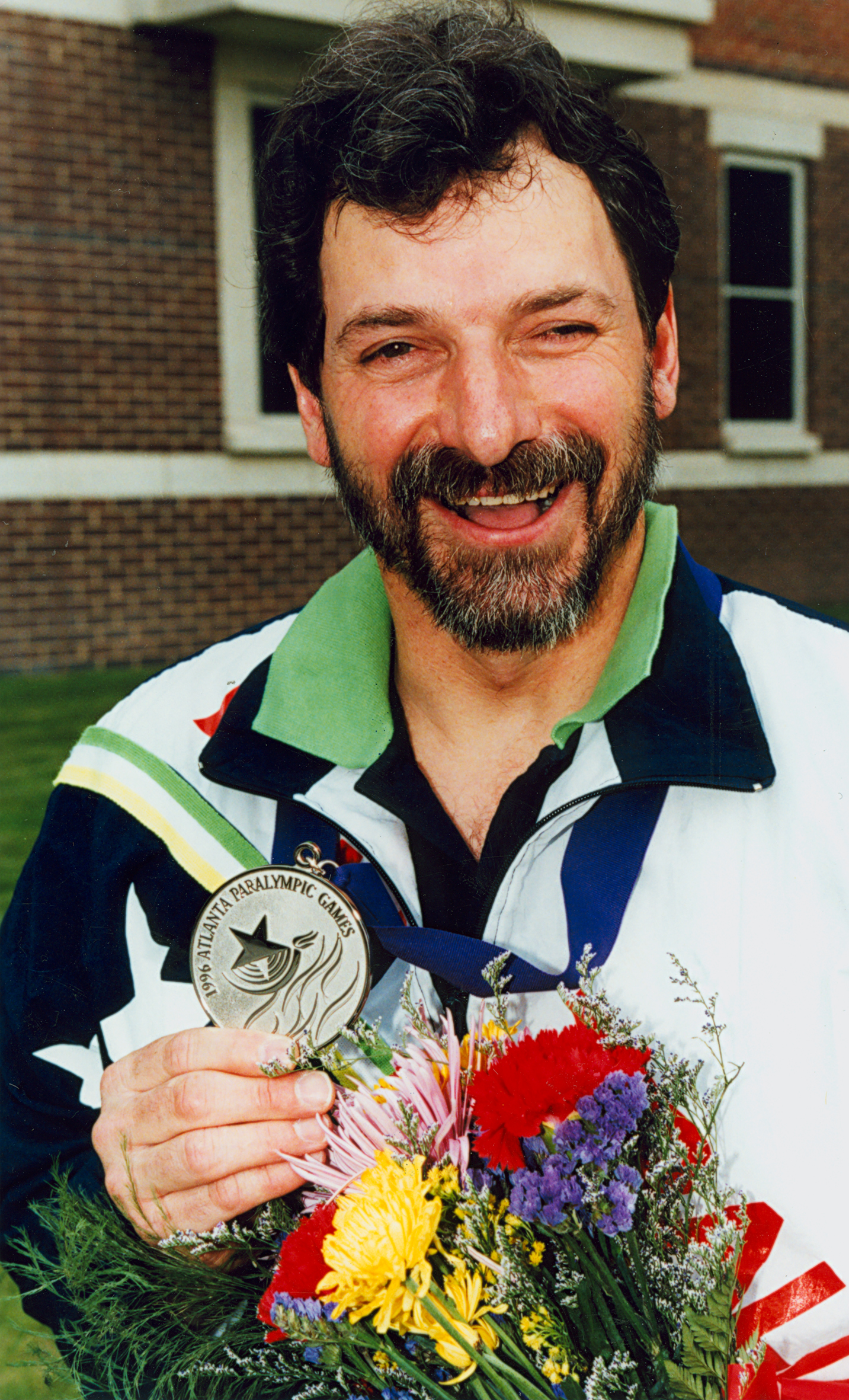
James Nomarhas with his silver medal, Atlanta 1996.

Australia represented by:
Men – Ashley Adams, Keith Bremner, Iain Fischer, James Nomarhas, Peter Worsley
Women – Patricia Fischer, Libby Kosmala
Coach – Yvonne Hill (Head), Raymund Brummell
.

The shooting events were some of the most competitive at the Atlanta Paralympics, with six world records and nine Paralympic records set. Australia did not set any of these records. The team still did well with Australian athletes setting 11 individual personal best records in the 22 events in which they competed. All but one of the seven Australian competitors set a personal best record.

Ashley Adams was a member of this 1996 Paralympics team. He set four personal best records. He also set three Australian records. Adams also appeared in one event final.

James Nomorhas was an ACT based shooter. He won a silver medal in the mixed SH1 Sport Pistol event.

Libby Kosmala is a shooter from South Australia. The 1996 Paralympics were the seventh Paralympics in which she competed.

=== Swimming ===
I've given up work and study, started training harder. Maybe I just wanted it more this time than I ever did before.

— Kingsley Bugarin, swimmer

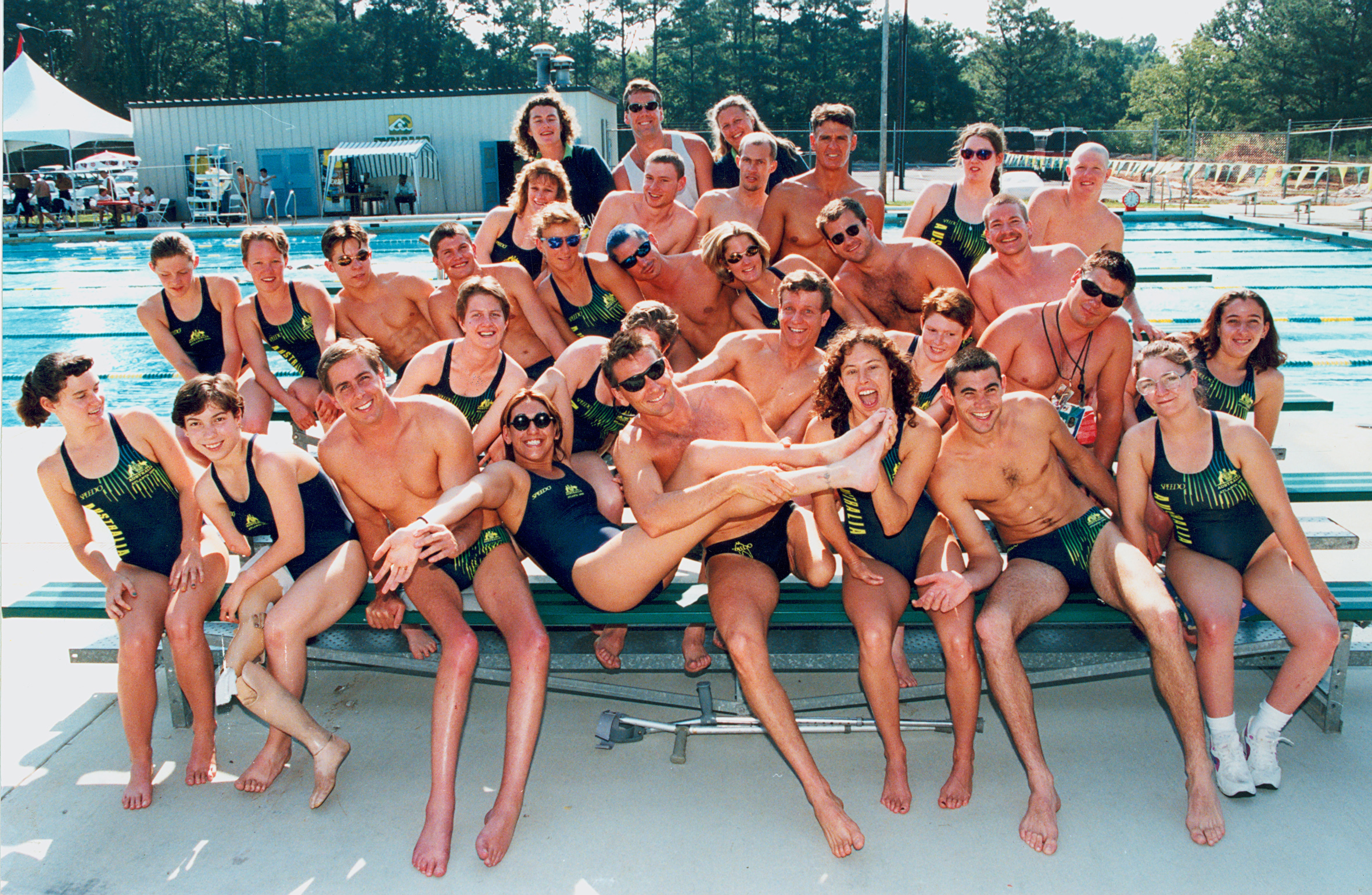
The Australian swimming team athletes pose at the training pool at the 1996 Atlanta Paralympic Games.

Australia represented by:
Men – Rodney Bonsack, Scott Brockenshire, Kingsley Bugarin, Brendan Burkett, Dominic Collins, Paul Cross, Cameron de Burgh, Grant Fitzpatrick, Paul Gockel, Alex Hadley, Jeff Hardy, Sean Harris, Brett Reid, Alastair Smales
Women – Petrea Barker, Melissa Carlton, Priya Cooper, Tracey Cross, Gemma Dashwood, Janelle Falzon, Alicia Jenkins, Karni Liddell, Vicky Machen, Tamara Nowitzki, Tracey Oliver, Lesly Page, Sarah-Jane Schulze, Cara Sullivan, Elizabeth Wright, Judith Young
Coaches – Ian Findlay (Head), Matthew Brown, Helen Cox, Kathryn Rogers
.

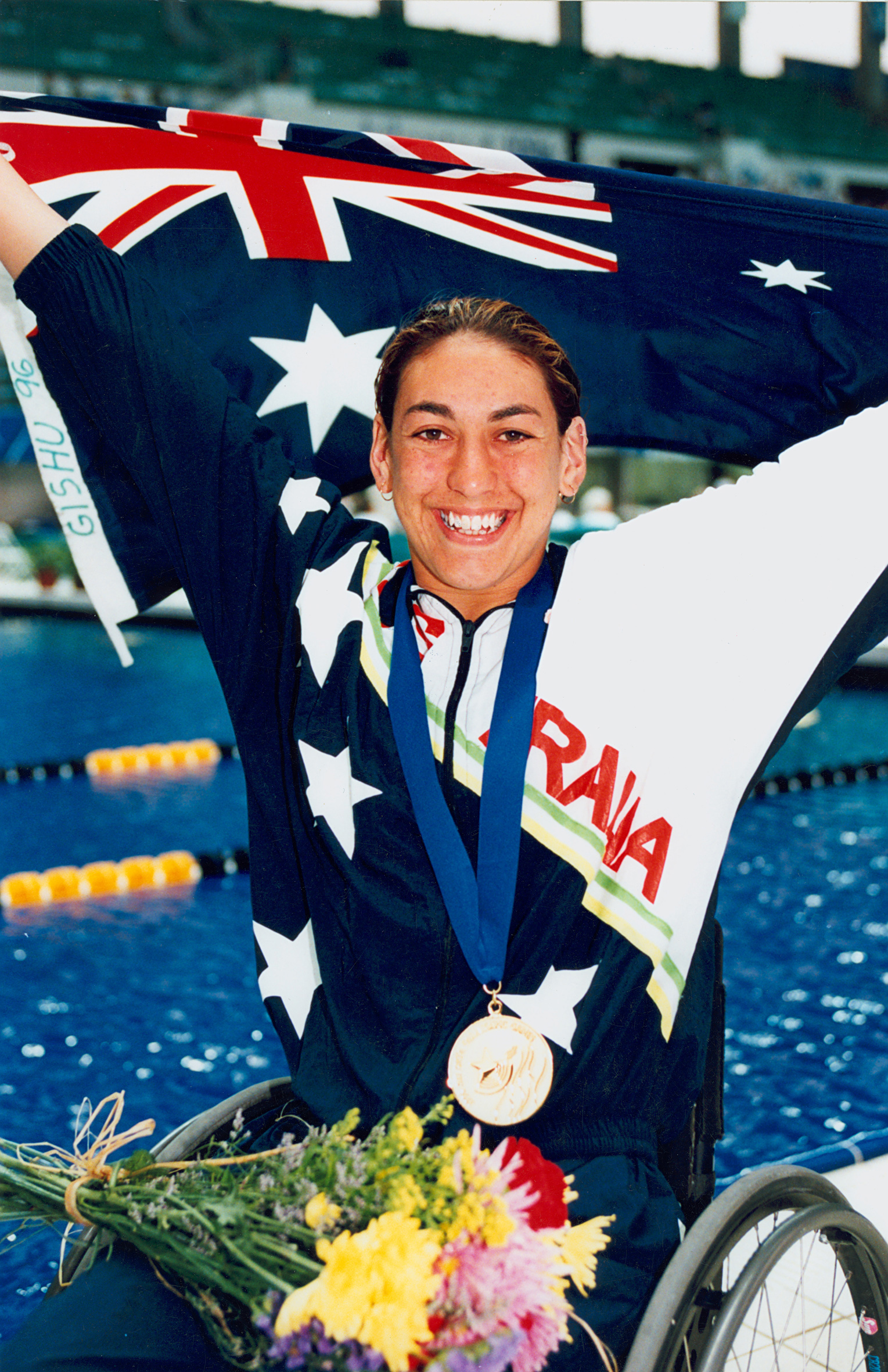
Priya Cooper after medal presentation ceremony

A training camp was held for Australian swimmers in Townsville prior to the start of the Games. Head coach Ian Findlay was hired with the intention of improving the overall level of coaching for the Paralympic Games and to help improve Australia's medal chances.

Priya Cooper from Western Australia won one gold medal in a swimming relay event and four individual gold medals for the 200m individual medley, the 100m backstroke, the 100m freestyle, and the 400m freestyle.

Kingsley Bugarin, a Perth-based vision impaired swimmer, competed in his fourth Paralympics in Atlanta at the age of 28. Prior to these Games, he had never won a Paralympic medal. In Atlanta, he won a gold medal in the 200m individual medley, where he set a world record. In the finals, he was seven seconds behind before the breaststroke, made up six of those seconds, and was only one second behind entering into the freestyle before he made it up to win the gold. He swam the 200m in 2 minutes and 22 seconds. His world records at the Games included 1:10.81 in the 100m breaststroke, 2:35.21 in the 200m breaststroke and 2:22.45 in the 200m individual medley.

Gemma Dashwood was another Australian competing. She set a world record in the 100m butterfly, where she captured a gold. Dashwood also won a silver medal in another swimming event.

Tracey Cross won a medal in the 100m butterfly race.

Jeff Hardy won a medal in the 100m men's butterfly race.

=== Wheelchair Basketball ===
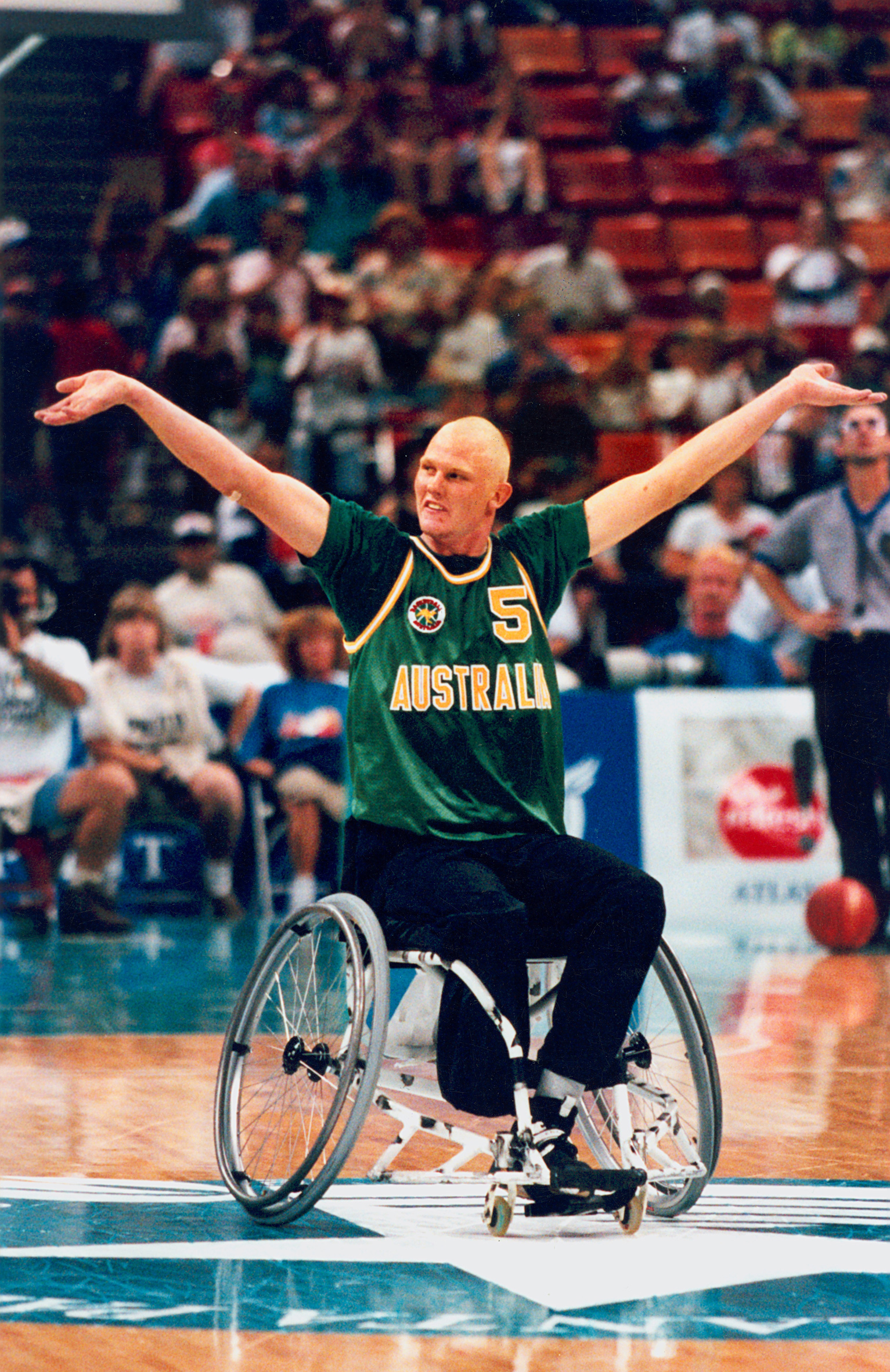
Troy Sachs

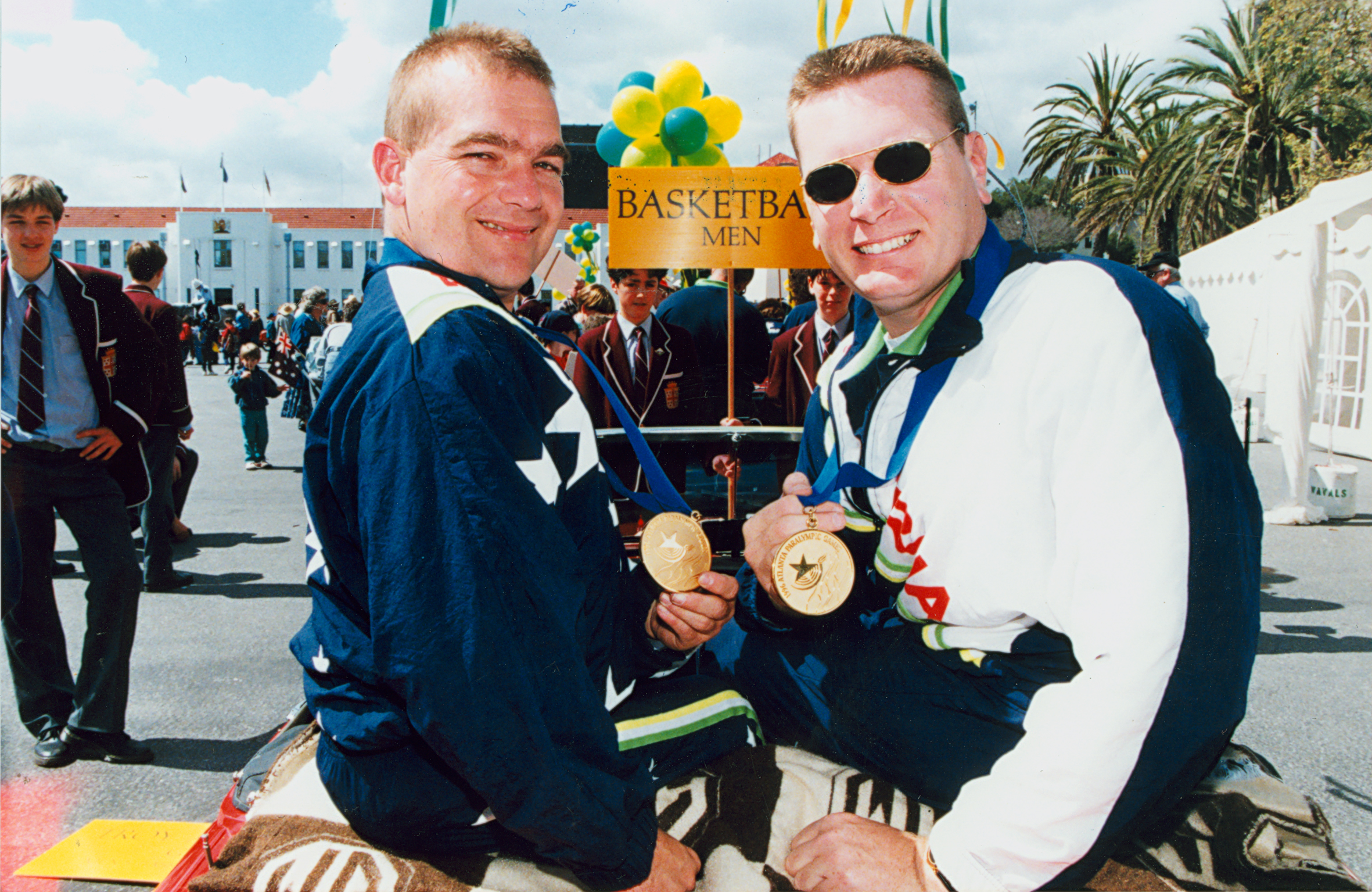
Troy Andrews and Tim Maloney - Wheelchair Basketball Team

==== Men's tournament ====
I've been dreaming about this for about 12 minutes and that's not a lie. The theme song for this was Holy Grail by Hunters and Collectors and that's what we got. You can use every superlative in the English language to describe what Troy did out there tonight. He was just awesome.

— Mark Walker, basketball coach

Men
Australia represented by:
Team – Men – Troy Andrews, Robert "Sandy" Blythe, Orfeo Cecconato, Benjamin Cox, Stuart Ewin, David Gould, Gerry Hewson, Timothy Maloney, Nick Morris, Richard Oliver, Troy Sachs, David Selby
Coaches – Mark Walker (Head), Evan Bennett Officials – Graham Gould .

Group A Results and Standings

Group A
Rank	Team	Pld	W	L	PF:PA	Pts	ESP	AUS	GBR	CAN	MEX	ARG
1	Spain	5	4	1	315:269	9	x	69:56	54:47	53:62	76:60	63:44
2	Australia	5	4	1	306:250	9	56:69	x	63:55	52:42	65:47	70:37
3	Great Britain	5	3	2	303:250	8	47:54	55:63	x	56:51	52:46	93:36
4	Canada	5	3	2	279:229	8	62:53	42:52	51:56	x	52:44	72:24
5	Mexico	5	1	4	244:287	6	60:76	47:65	46:52	44:52	x	47:42
6	Argentina	5	0	5	183:345	5	44:63	37:70	36:93	24:72	42:47	x

Quarter-final Australia 46 defeated Netherlands 44

Semi-final Australia 63 defeated the United States 57

Gold Medal Match Australia 78 defeated Great Britain 63

Australia was seeded sixth coming into the Atlanta Paralympic tournament. The men's team toured England and the Netherlands in the lead up to the Paralympics.

Australia beat Great Britain 78–63 in the gold medal game. This was Australia's first gold medal result in a major international competition for men or women. The match also had the largest recorded American crowd for a wheelchair basketball game with 10,061 people in attendance. Many Australians watched the game live. Australia had come back from a 15-point deficit of 20–5 during the first six minutes of the gold medal game. By halftime, Australia was down by one point after having briefly taken the lead a minute earlier.

Troy Sachs is one of Australia's most popular and famous Paralympians. Sachs was born with one leg missing below the knee. He first competed at the 1992 Summer Paralympics in Barcelona when he was 15 years old. He was 19 years old during these Games. In the gold medal game against Great Britain, he scored 42 points for his team. 15 of those points came from five three-point shots. He had a shooting percentage of forty-seven during the gold medal match, making eleven of his twenty-three attempted shots. He went fifteen of twenty-four from the free throw line. Hopping from his chair, Sachs cut down the net after the game ended in victory for Australia.

==== Women's tournament ====
Women
Australia represented by:
Team – Julianne Adams, Amanda Carter, Paula Ewin, Melissa Ferrett, Alison Mosely, Lisa O'Nion, Donna Philp, Donna Ritchie, Amanda Rose, Sharon Slann, Liesl Tesch, Jane Webb
Coaches – Peter Corr, Tracy York Officials – Shona Casey
.

Group A Results and Standings

Group A
Rank	Team	Pld	W	L	PF:PA	Pts	AUS	USA	GER	BRA
1	Australia	3	2	1	132:71	5	x	31:27	34:36	67:8
2	United States	3	2	1	128:79	5	27:31	x	44:36	57:12
3	Germany	3	2	1	121:92	5	36:34	36:44	x	49:14
4	Brazil	3	0	3	34:173	3	8:67	12:57	14:49	x

Semi-finals Canada 36 defeated Australia 31

Bronze Medal Match United States 41 defeated Australia 30

Prior to the start of the Paralympics, Australia was ranked third in the world. In lead up preparations for the games, the team toured Canada.

Australia's women's team beat the American team for the first time in pool play, to stay in contention for a medal. This was viewed as extremely significant by Australian women's wheelchair basketball fans and the Australian Paralympic Federation because of the dominance of the American team in women's wheelchair basketball. Australia was down 21–16 at halftime. Australia went up with seven minutes left in the second half. The match finished with a score of 31–27 in Australia's favour. American Sharon Herbst was their team's start performer and she caused a number of problems for Australia's defence. During the game, several players were knocked out of their wheelchairs, including Australia's Melissa Ferrett. The Americans challenged the win, protesting because they believed the Australians were not wearing matching uniforms.

Australia's team was coached by Peter Corr and captained by Donna Ritchie. The team's top scorer in the competition was Liesl Tesch.

Australia beat Brazil 67–8, beat the USA 31–27 and lost to Germany 34–26 in pool play. They lost to Canada in the semifinals, going down 31–36. They played the Americans in the bronze medal match, losing 30–41.

This was the first Paralympic basketball tournament to feature the three-wheeled wheelchair. Most of the women on the Australian team opted to use the traditional four-wheeled wheelchair.

=== Wheelchair Rugby ===
Australia represented by:
Men – Brett Boylan, Garry Croker, Andrew Greenaway, Rodney Hamilton, David Jacka, Peter Lock, Steve Porter, Baden Whitehead
Coach – Darryl Wingard
.

Wheelchair rugby was a demonstration sport at the 1996 Summer Paralympics. The only wheelchair contact sport played in the Paralympics, it was required that a welder attend games to repair wheelchairs of players when contact caused damage. National rugby rivalries carried over into the wheelchair event, with the Australian team viewing the match against New Zealand as one of their most important.

Team member George Hucks broke his kneecap during practice in Atlanta, prior to the start of the games. He was flown home and another player was flown from Australia to replace him. Hucks, from South Australia, was considered one of the team's best players.

Australia did not win a single match in wheelchair rugby. They lost to New Zealand 23–39, to Great Britain 33–34, to Canada 24–39, to the USA 18–31 and to Sweden 25–29.

Wheelchair rugby would become a permanent addition to future paralympics. Australia would medal in the following four summer games, twice winning gold.

=== Wheelchair Tennis ===
Australia represented by:
Men – Mick Connell, David Hall
Women – Daniela Di Toro, Randa Hinson

Coach – Greg Crump
.

David Hall competed for Australia in wheelchair tennis at the 1996 Paralympic Games, where he won a silver and bronze medal. He lost his legs in an accident when he was sixteen years old in a car accident.

Athlete	Event	Round of 64	Round of 32	Round of 16	Quarterfinals	Semifinals	Final	
Athlete	Event	Opposition Result	Opposition Result	Opposition Result	Opposition Result	Opposition Result	Opposition Result	Rank
David Hall	Men's singles	bye	Satosji Saida (JPN); W 6–2, 6–1	Stefan Bitterauf (GER); W 7–6, 6–1	Vance Parmelly (USA); W 7–5, 7–5	Ricky Molier (NED); L 7–6, 5–7, 5–7	Laurent Giammartini (FRA); W 6–3, 6–0	Bronze medal
Mick Connell	Men's singles	Jussi Juntenen (FIN); W 6–0, 6–2	Laurent Giammartini (FRA); L 2–6, 6–4, 3–6	Did not advance				
Daniela Di Toro	Women's singles	N/A	bye	Janet McMorran (GBR); W 6–4, 6–1	Kanae Kitamoto (JPN); W 6–4, 6–1	Maaike Smit (NED); L 7–6, 1–6, 4–6	Chantal Vandierendonck (NED); L 4–6, 6–4, 3–6	4
Randa Henson	Women's singles	N/A	Christa Ott (GER); W 6–4, 7–6	Oristelle Marx (FRA); L 2–6, 1–6	Did not advance			
David Hall; Mick Connell	Men's doubles	N/A	bye	Rolando Avila/ Rene Corona (MEX); W 6–0, 6–1	Gerald Metroz/ Martin Erni (SUI); W 6–0, 6–0	Eric Stuurman/ Ricky Molier (NED); W 7–6, 6–1	Stephen Welch/ Vance Parmelly (USA); L 2–6, 6–3, 6–7	Silver medal
Daniela Di Toro; Randa Henson	Women's doubles	N/A		bye	Tiki Aharoni/ Kineret Wallach (ISR); W 6–1, 6–1	Chantal Vandierendonck/ Monique Kalkman-Van Den Bosch (NED); L 1–6, 0–6	Oristelle Marx/ Arlette Racineux (FRA); L 2–6, 7–6, 2–6	4

== Individual Highlights ==
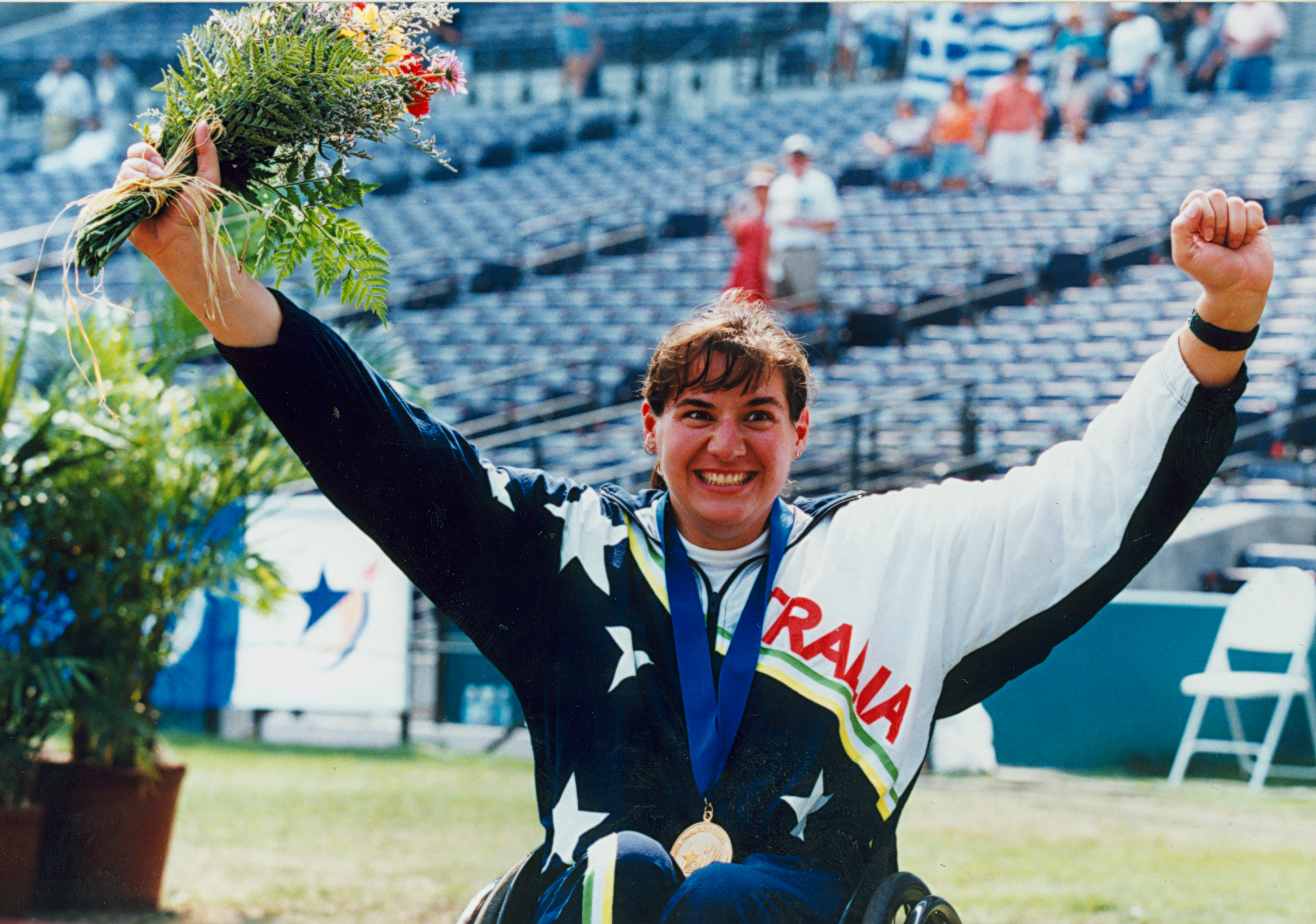
Louise Sauvage after winning 1 of her 4 gold medals.

Louise Sauvage (Australia) is one of the most influential Paralympians of all time. Those who were lucky enough to see her at the '96 games were treated to 4 gold medals in the 400, 800, 1500 and 5000 meter wheelchair racing events. She won almost one – tenth of all Australia's medals that year. At a young age she was also coached by former Paralympic champion Frank Ponta who she described as a patient coach at a young age. Not only was she successful in Athens she went on to record 13 medals across 4 Olympic games. Her book, 'My Story' published in 2002 is a fine farewell before another 2 silver medals in 2004, her last Paralympic games. She has also since been inducted into the Paralympic hall of fame, in 2011.

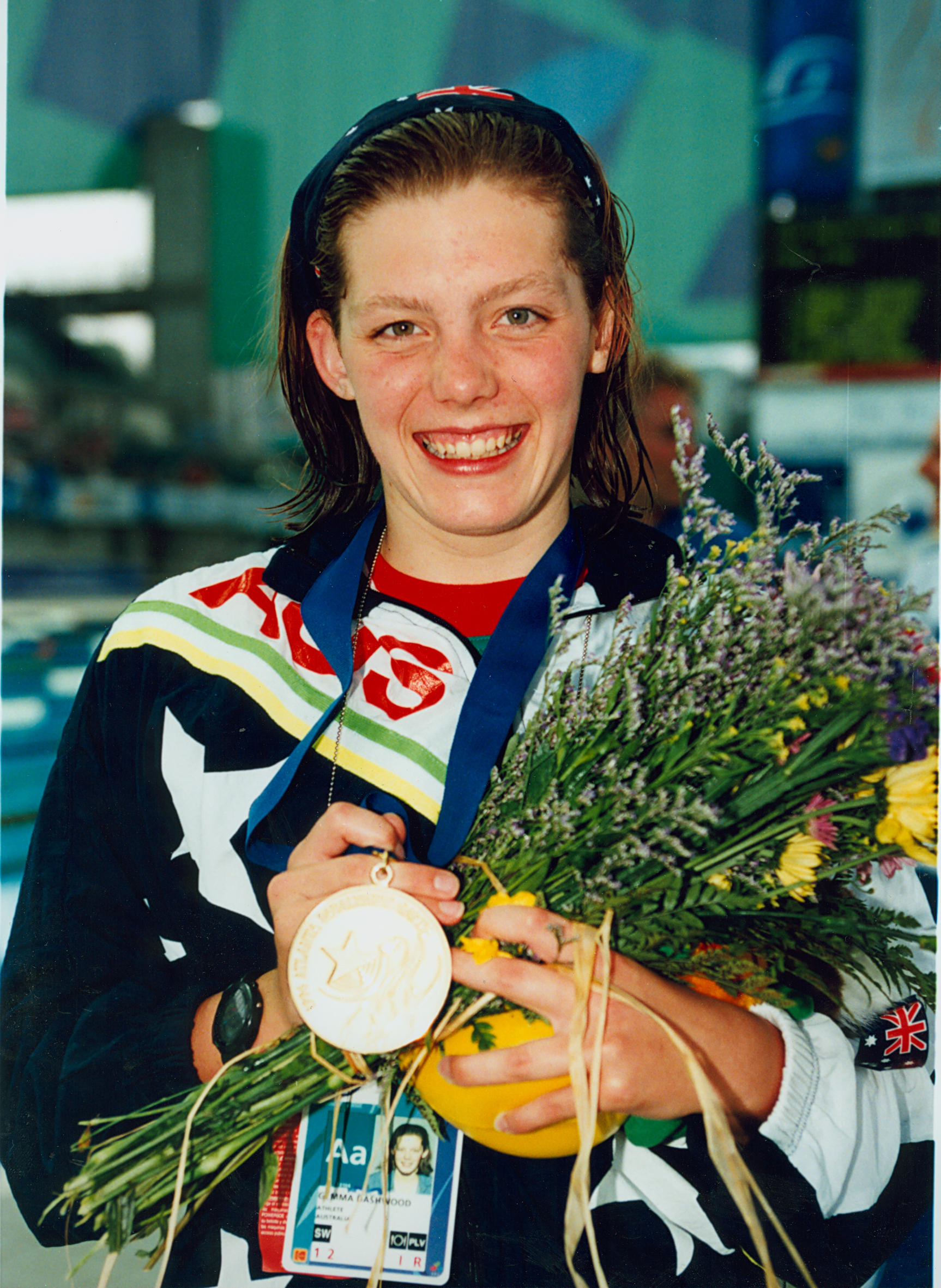
Gemma Dashwood at her most successful Paralympic games.

Kingsley Bugarin was Australia's best swimmer with a world record swim in the 200m B2(s12) Breastroke with a time of 2:35:21 at the games and finished with gold. He also medalled in the 100m Breastroke (gold), 200 individual medley (gold) as well as silver medals in the 100m butterfly and 100m freestyle and finally a bronze in the 400m freestyle.

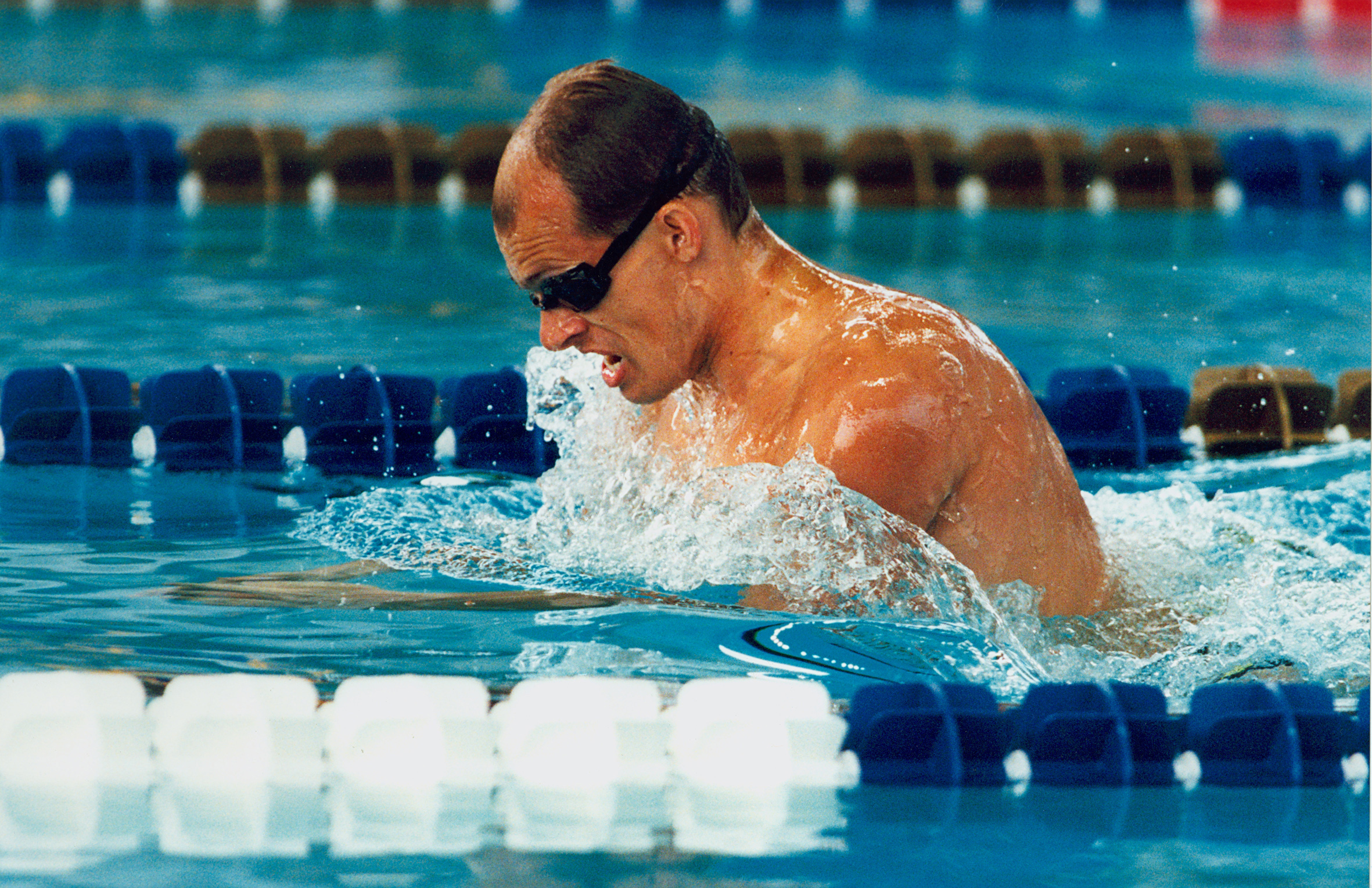
Kingsley Bugarin - 200m breastroke world record holder

Gemma Dashwood had her best ever paralympic games with 3 gold in the Women's 100 m Butterfly S10, Women's 400 m Freestyle S10 and the Women's 4 × 100 m Freestyle S7-10. She also picked up two silver medals in the Women's 100m and 200m Freestyle S10. She now works at Canberra hospital after finishing swimming and studying medicine.

Brendan Burkett was also a long time competitor who stood out in Atlanta. He achieved a gold medal in the Men's 50 m S9 Freestyle as well as a silver in S7-10 Men's 4 × 100 m Freestyle relay. He went on to compete at 4 Paralympic games and be the flag bearer at the 2000 Sydney Paralympics and received the Outstanding Service to Swimming Australia Award in 2009. In 2009 he was also inducted into the Queensland sporting Hall of Fame.

Priya Cooper is an S8 classification swimmer who competed in 8 events at the 1996 games. She was also the co-captain of the swimming team and brought home 5 gold medals. She also was a flag bearer at the closing ceremony for her outstanding achievements in the pool. In October 2015, her career was formerly recognised when she became the fourth Paralympian to be inducted into the Sport Australia Hall of Fame.

== Closing ceremonies ==
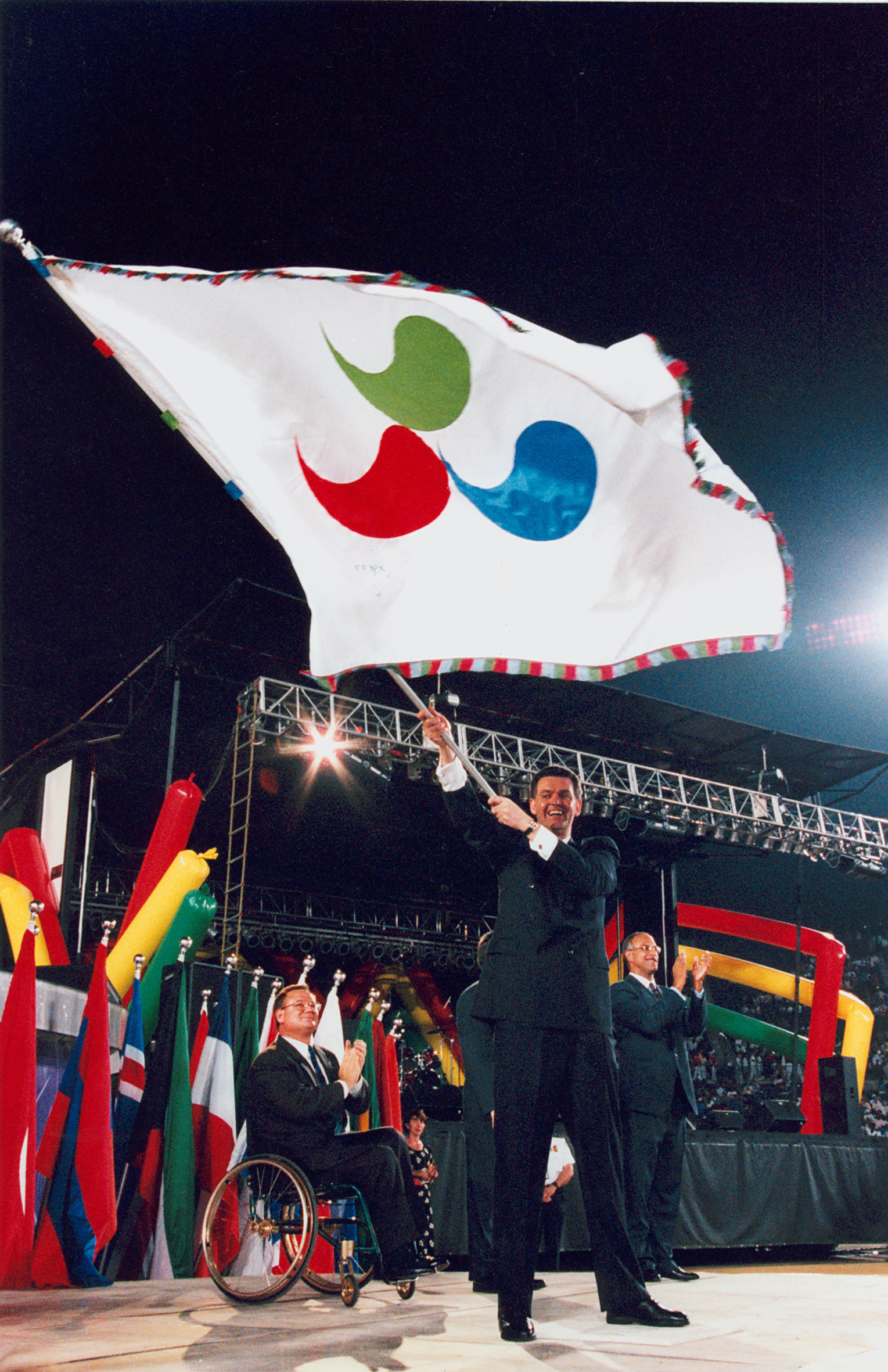
Michael Knight with the IPC flag at the closing ceremony

As representative for the next host city, Michael Knight, the New South Wales Minister for the Olympics, was presented with an IPC flag during the closing ceremonies. The success of the Atlanta games would continue on with the games being locked in for Sydney for the 2000 Sydney Paralympics.

== Return home ==
We earned respect because of the way that we played and the commitment we put into the sports. Whether you are disabled or able-bodied, this is what it is all about. This is what you train for, and this is equality right now.

— Troy Sachs, wheelchair basketball team

When the Games were over, athletes returned home to parades and receptions. These events took place in all Australian state and territory capitals. New South Wales based athletes were greeted at the Sydney airport by the Federal Minister for Sport Warwick Smith and the Premier of New South Wales Bob Carr. A parade was later held in Sydney, with tens of thousands of people attending. In Victoria, an event was held at the Melbourne Cricket Ground prior to the start of an Australian Football League playoff game. Another reception was held in Victoria at Parliament House, Melbourne, with the Premier of Victoria Jeff Kennett as the host and the Victorian Workcover Authority as the sponsor. People turned out in their thousands throughout the major cities. These were sponsored by city councils and State governments.

== Impact ==
The success in Atlanta was widespread and across a wide range of disciplines. 66% of the Australian team medalled or put up personal best performances: the best performance from an Australian team at a paralympics.

Alongside the core 14 sports included in the official Paralympic program, Atlanta's calendar included two demonstration sports: Sailing and Wheelchair rugby. Both sports would later become permanent additions to the Paralympics. While only one sailing event was included in the Atlanta games, the discipline would be expanded in future games to include a single sailor event, the 2.4 meter, the 2 person event, mixed crew boat or Skud18 and finally the Sonar event with 3 sailors.

The Atlanta Paralympics was the first to incorporate athletes with intellectual disability. This was a huge step forward in the movement of the Paralympic games and gave an opportunity to those athletes that previously were unable to compete. The number of intellectually impaired athletes has been steadily growing with the inclusion of new events into the paralympic program.

The 1993 announcement that the 2000 Sydney bid was successful saw a major influx of money and attention to the Paralympic games. The 1994 report from the Australian Paralympic Federation highlighted key improvements to be put in place for Atlanta. These included the Olympic Athlete Program which was able to fund increased training camps and equipment, funding for tournaments, travel and administration. It gave athletes the opportunity to prepare as well as possible while providing financial support for competition and overseas travel. This momentum, coupled with a second overall medal tally elevated the paralympic sports to the elite level, placing all athletes in good stead come Sydney 2000.

== Hall of Fame ==
Athletes that competed in the 1996 Atlanta games who have since been inducted to the Australian Paralympic Hall of Fame:

-Louise Sauvage (Wheelchair racing - inducted 2011)

-David Hall (Tennis - inducted 2016)

-Priya Cooper (Swimming - inducted 2015)

David Hall on induction to Australian Sporting Hall of Fame

It was an amazing feeling and made me feel very proud to be an Australian, especially considering we have such a rich sporting history in this country. For me, the wonderful thing about being inducted is that it recognises disability sporting achievements, being recognised felt like a real validation for Paralympic sport and Paralympic athletes.

== Attendance and Media coverage ==
There was more media coverage for the 1996 Paralympics in Australia than there was for previous Paralympic Games. The Australian Paralympic Federation set a goal prior to the start of the Games to do just this, with a focus on attaining coverage in sections other than the sport pages of newspapers. Media outlets that covered Australia at the Paralympics included Who Weekly, ABC Radio National, Nine Network's Today Show, Channel Seven's AM and Witness programs, and coverage in all the national newspapers. Channel Seven, an Australian commercial station, sent a crew to Atlanta to cover the Games. The crew did live interviews, and helped provide coverage of the Games. This coverage included several segments of fifteen minutes during the station's news programs. Media coverage of the Games was aided by the time difference: Event results came in live during morning shows on Australian radio.

Paul Griffiths was leading most of the work when early in 1996 and helped secure exposure and media for Atlanta with his work with ABC TV Sport, before stepping down from the job. Greg Campbell was also a major contributor with exposure and all media types getting a boost between January and September in 1996. This led to increased sponsorship and awareness coming up to the Atlanta games, gained much needed momentum that solidified the games as an elite sport, gaining high level media traction. The Australian Paralympic Federation considered the media coverage to be a great success in terms of boosting awareness of its program and its athletes.

== See also ==
- Images of the Australian Team at the 1996 Summer Paralympics

== Bibliography ==
- Athletics Australia. Australian Athletics, Historical Results. AIS, Canberra.
- Australian Paralympic Committee (2015). The Australian Paralympic History Project. Sydney.
- Australian Paralympic Federation (1997). Annual Report. Sydney.
- Australian Paralympic Federation (1996). Golden days of Atlanta: Xth Paralympic Games Atlanta, Georgia, August 15–25, 1996. Sydney. OCLC 222120061.
- Chesterton, Ray (1996). "Troy's pride and joy". Golden days of Atlanta: Xth Paralympic Games Atlanta, Georgia, August 15–25, 1996. Sydney: Australian Paralympic Federation. pp. 18–20. OCLC 222120061.
- "Clinton Pledges Thorough Effort to Find Olympic Park Bomber". CNN. 27 July 1996.
- Davis, Ronald. "The 1996 Atlanta Paralympics". vol. 67, no. 6, pp. 59.: Journal of Physical Education, Recareation & Dance.
- Ellis, Leanne (5 August 1996). "Going for gold". The Canberra Times.
- Hogan, John (12 August 1996). "McNicholl's lift-off countdown". The Australian.
- Kelly, Peter (1996). "Never Seen before in Paralympic Sport". Golden Days of Atlanta: XTH Paralympic Games Atlanta, Georgia, August 15–25, 1996. Sydney: Australian Paralympic Federation. OCLC 222120061.
- Little, Marie (1997). "1997 Annual Report". Sydney: Australian Paralympic Federation.
- Mcullough, Bob (1996). "Annual Report". Sydney: Australian Paralympic Federation.
- Mills-Hicks, James; Barnard, Loretta; Etherington, Kate; Olds, Margaret, eds. (2001). Australian Sport Through Time (Revised edition 2001 ed.). Sydney: Random House Australia. ISBN 1-74051-445-9.
- Overington, Caroline (1996). "Swimmer's First Gold a World Record". Golden days of Atlanta: Xth Paralympic Games Atlanta, Georgia, August 15–25, 1996. Sydney: Australian Paralympic Federation. pp. 56–58. OCLC 222120061.
- Overington, Caroline (1996a). "Basketballers beat the US at their own game". Golden days of Atlanta: Xth Paralympic Games Atlanta, Georgia, August 15–25, 1996. Sydney: Australian Paralympic Federation. pp. 21–23. OCLC 222120061.
- Overington, Caroline (19 August 1996b). "Jones beats record, field and gamesmanship". The Sydney Morning Herald.
- Reed, Ron (1996). "All Blacks Dominate Bledisloe Clash of Crash". Golden days of Atlanta: Xth Paralympic Games Atlanta, Georgia, August 15–25, 1996. Sydney: Australian Paralympic Federation. OCLC 222120061.
- "Sporting Hall of Fame for David Hall". Australian Paralympic Committee. 5 March 2011.
- Sports 'n Spokes Magazine (July 2006). "Aussie Champ Retires". Sports 'n Spokes Magazine. 32 (4). SportDiscus with Full Text: 10. ISSN 0161-6706.
- Webster, Jim (1996). "Success for superteam". Golden days of Atlanta: Xth Paralympic Games Atlanta, Georgia, August 15–25, 1996. Sydney: Australian Paralympic Federation. pp. 6–8. OCLC 222120061.
