= Scott Elsworth =

Australian Paralympian

Medal record

Representing Australia

Boccia

Paralympic Games

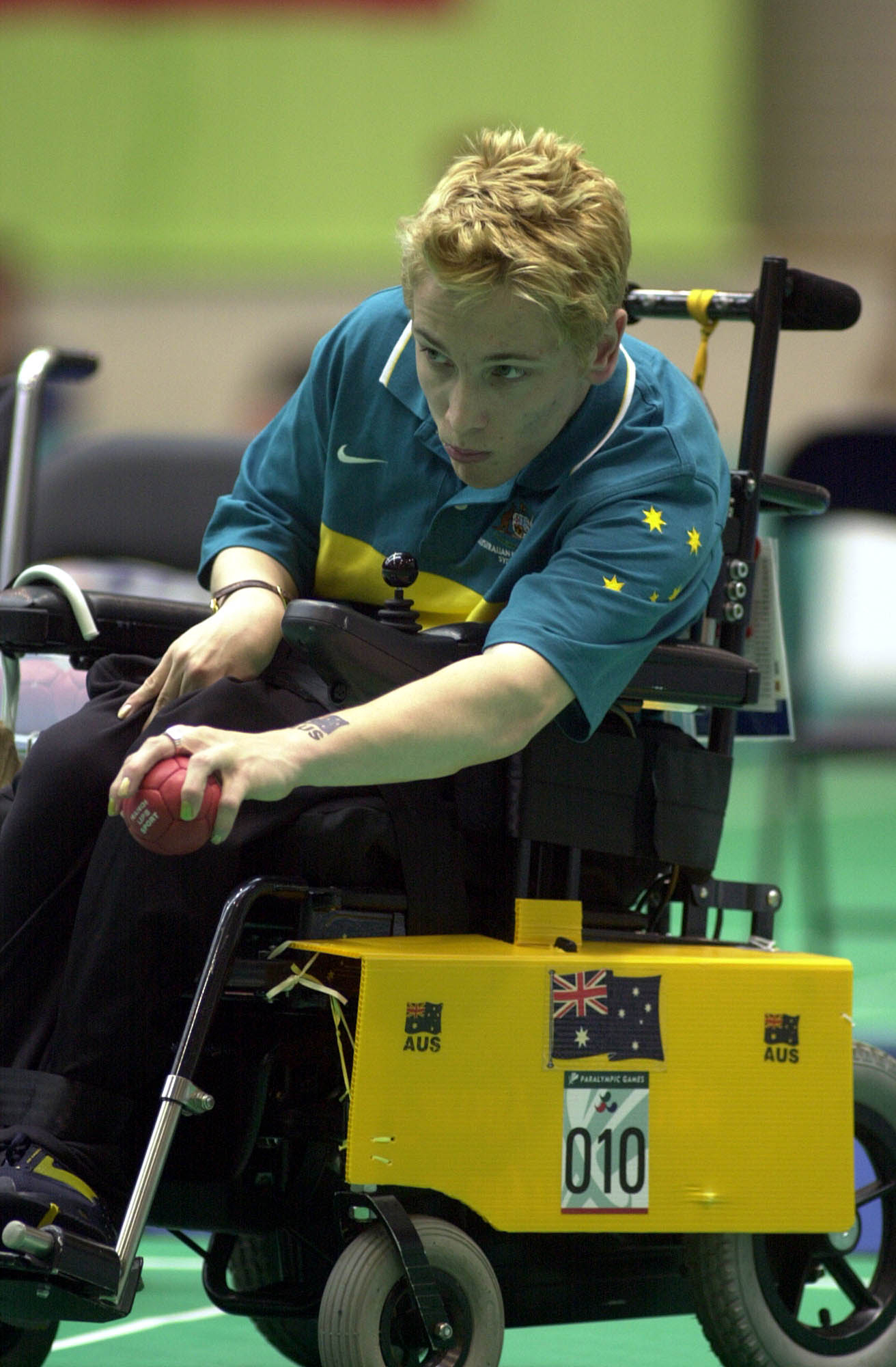
Elsworth in action during competition at the 2000 Sydney Paralympics

Scott Elsworth is an Australian Paralympian who competed in boccia at the 1996 Summer Paralympics and the 2000 Summer Paralympics. He is from New South Wales. At the 1996 Games, his team finished fifth. He is a thrower in boccia. He was coached at the 2000 Games by Joan Stevens. In the period between 1996 and 2000, Elswoth's preparation was hampered because Australia did not compete at many international events.

== See also ==
- Australia at the 1996 Summer Paralympics

== Bibliography ==
- International Paralympic Committee (17 October 2000). "Boccia Preview". Sydney 2000 Paralympic Games Official Program. Sydney.
