= Tu Huynh =

Australian boccia Paralympian (born 1978)

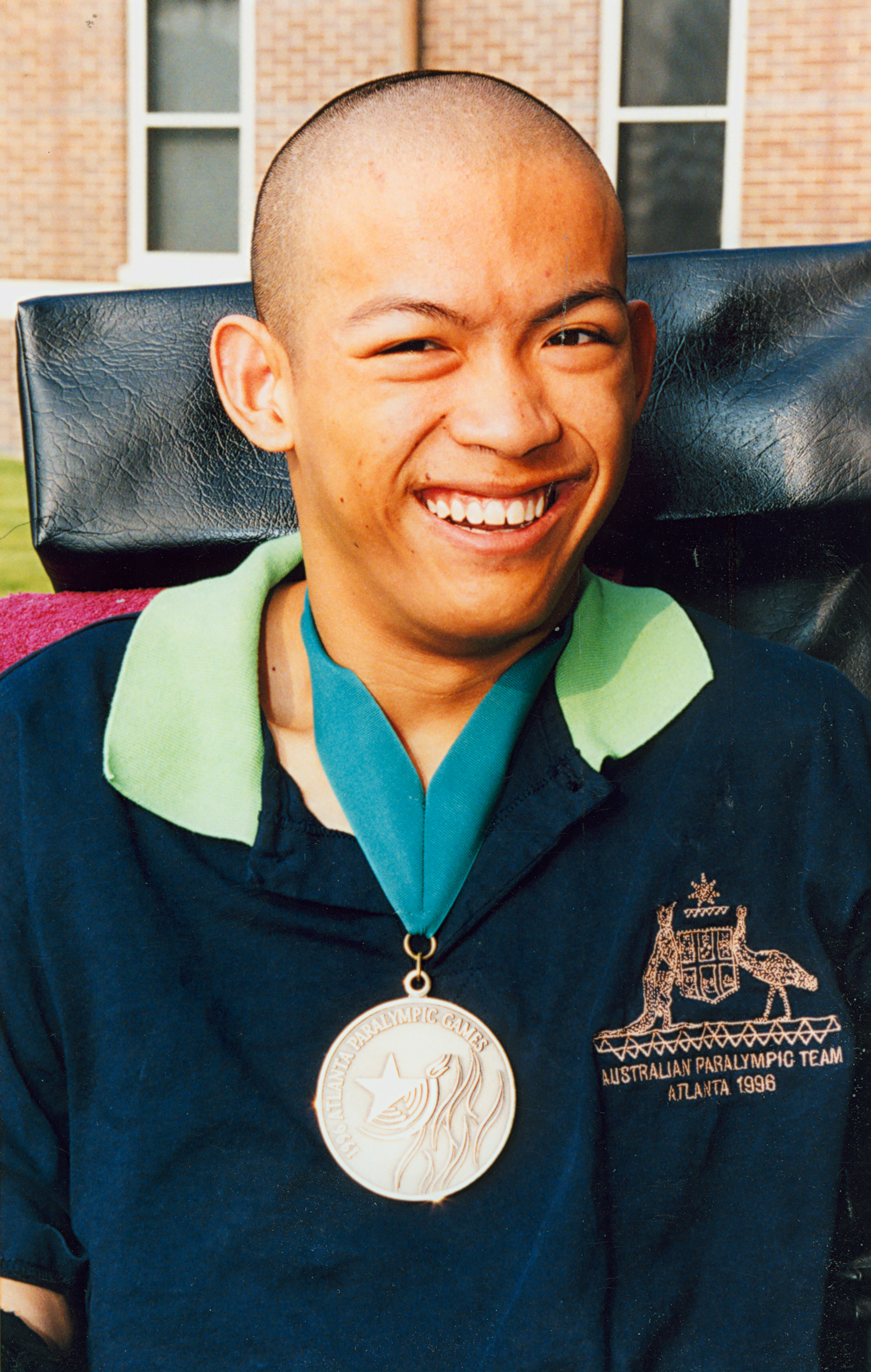
- Tu Huyhn with the bronze medal he won at the Atlanta Paralympics

Personal information
- Nationality: Australia
- Born: 10 September 1978 (age 47) Tay Ninh, Vietnam
Medal record
Boccia
Paralympic Games
Bronze medal – third place	1996 Atlanta	Mixed pairs C1 WAD

Tu Huynh (born 10 September 1978) is an Australian boccia Paralympian. He was born in Tay Ninh, Vietnam.

== Career ==
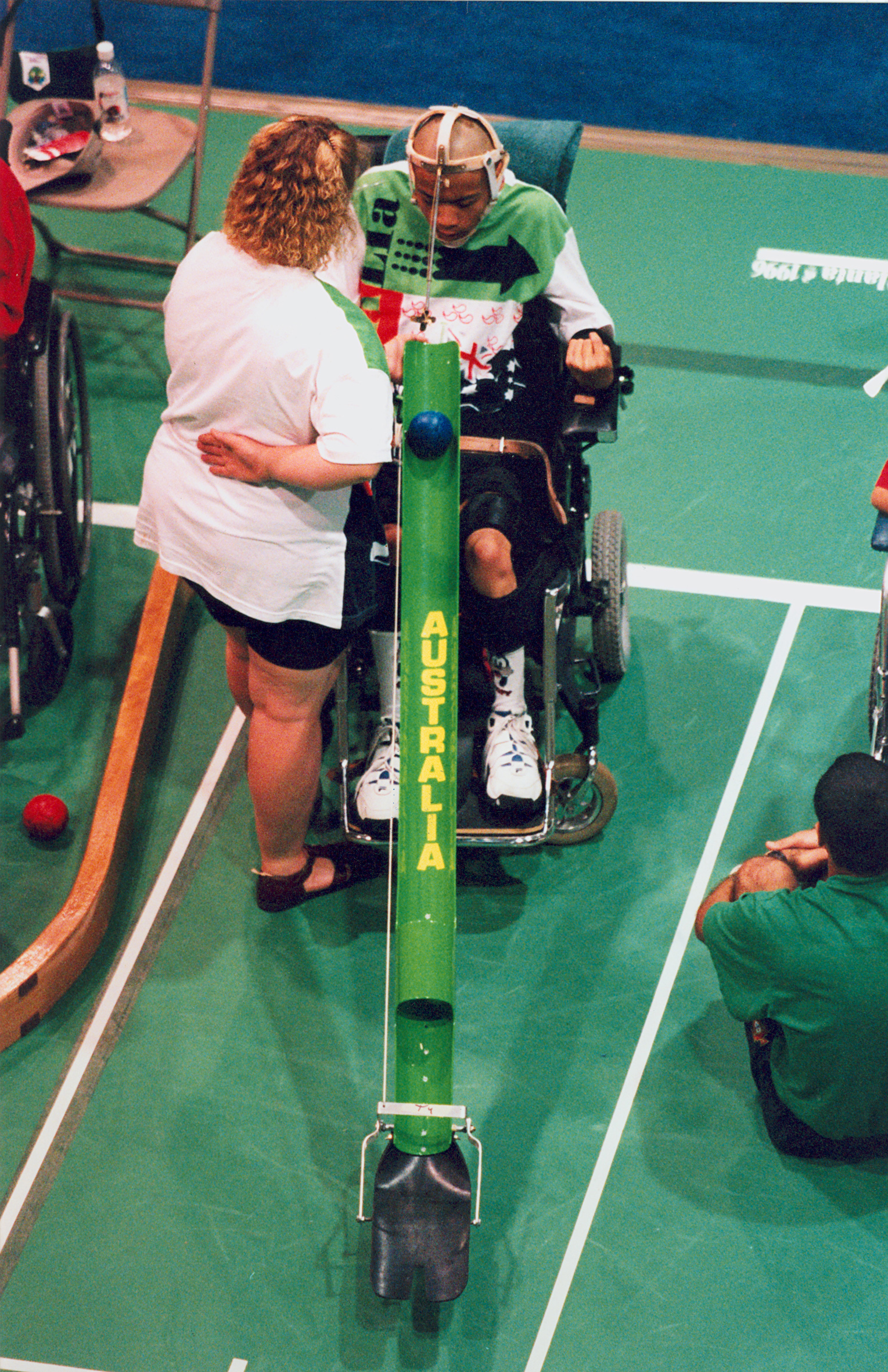
Australian boccia player Tu Huynh with ramp assistant Joanne Titterton in the C1 WAD competition at the 1996 Atlanta Paralympic Games

The pairs C/WAD team of Kris Bignall and Tu Huynh were ranked as the seventh best pair in the world prior to the start of the games. They surprised the world when they won a bronze medal after beating Spain and New Zealand in the preliminaries, and after beating an American pair in the bronze medal match. The play-off for the bronze medal put a lot of pressure on the pair, as a result Bignall and Huynh developed the nickname 'Gruesome Twosome' in an attempt to psych out their opponents. Their medal was the first medal Australia had won in this sport in international competition.

Tu Huynh also competed in the individual events in the C1 WAD category. He finished fifth in pool play and did not qualify for the medal play off stage. As an individual competitor, Huynh had a ramp assistant, Joanne Titterton, who assisted him during the CI WAD category competition.

== Honours ==
As he was the first NSW Boccia player to win a medal at the Paralympic Games in Atlanta in 1996, Huynh has had an award named in his honour, 'The Tu Huynh Memorial Award for Sporting Excellence'. The award is presented each year to the athlete who demonstrates qualities shown by Huynh in his career.

== See also ==
- Australia at the 1996 Summer Paralympics

== Bibliography ==
- Australian Paralympic Federation (1996). Golden Days of Atlanta: Xth Paralympic Games Atlanta, Georgia, August 15–25, 1996. Sydney. OCLC 222120061.
