= Kris Bignall =

Australian boccia Paralympian

Medal record

Representing Australia

Boccia

Paralympic Games
Bronze medal – third place	1996 Atlanta	Pairs BCWAD

Kris Bignall (born 31 January 1979) is an Australian boccia Paralympian. He was born in Southport, Queensland.

The pairs C/WAD team of Kris Bignall and Tu Huyhn were ranked as the seventh best pair in the world prior to the start of the games. They surprised the world when they won a bronze medal after beating Spain and New Zealand in the preliminaries, and after beating an American pair in the bronze medal match. Their medal was the first medal Australia had won in this sport in international competition.

Kris Bignall also competed as an individual in the C1 WAD category. He made it to the medals play off stage, where he lost.

== See also ==
- Australia at the 1996 Summer Paralympics

== Bibliography ==
- Australian Paralympic Federation (1996). Golden Days of Atlanta: XTH Paralympic Games Atlanta, Georgia, August 15–25, 1996. Sydney. OCLC 222120061.
