= Leroi Court =

Australian Paralympic competitor

Personal information
- Nationality: Australia
- Born: 20 March 1963 (age 63) Sydney, New South Wales
Medal record
Athletics
Paralympic Games
Bronze medal – third place	1996 Atlanta	Men's 100 m T12

Leroi Court (born 20 March 1963) was an Australian Paralympic competitor. He was born in Sydney, New South Wales. He won a bronze medal in the men's athletics 100 metres T12 event the 1996 Summer Paralympics with a time of 0:11.48.
