= Dominic Collins (swimmer) =

Australian Paralympic swimmer

Personal information
- Nationality: Australia
- Born: 11 April 1977 (age 49) Sydney, New South Wales
Medal record
Swimming
Paralympic Games
Silver medal – second place	1996 Atlanta	Men's 4x100 m Freestyle S7–10

Dominic Collins (born 11 April 1977) is an Australian Paralympic swimmer. He was born in Sydney, New South Wales. At the 1996 Atlanta Games, he won a silver medal in the Men's 4x100 m Freestyle S7–10 event. He participated without winning any medals at the 2000 Sydney Games.
