= Benjamin Cox (sportsman) =

Australian wheelchair basketball player

Personal information
- Full name: Benjamin Richard Cox
- Nationality: Australia
- Born: 13 December 1975 (age 50) England
Medal record
Wheelchair basketball
Paralympic Games
Gold medal – first place	1996 Atlanta	Men's wheelchair basketball

Benjamin Richard Cox, OAM (born 13 December 1975) is an Australian wheelchair basketball player. He was born in England. He was part of the gold medal-winning Australia men's national wheelchair basketball team at the 1996 Summer Paralympics, for which he received a Medal of the Order of Australia.
