= Pauline Cahill =

Paralympic lawn bowls player of Australia

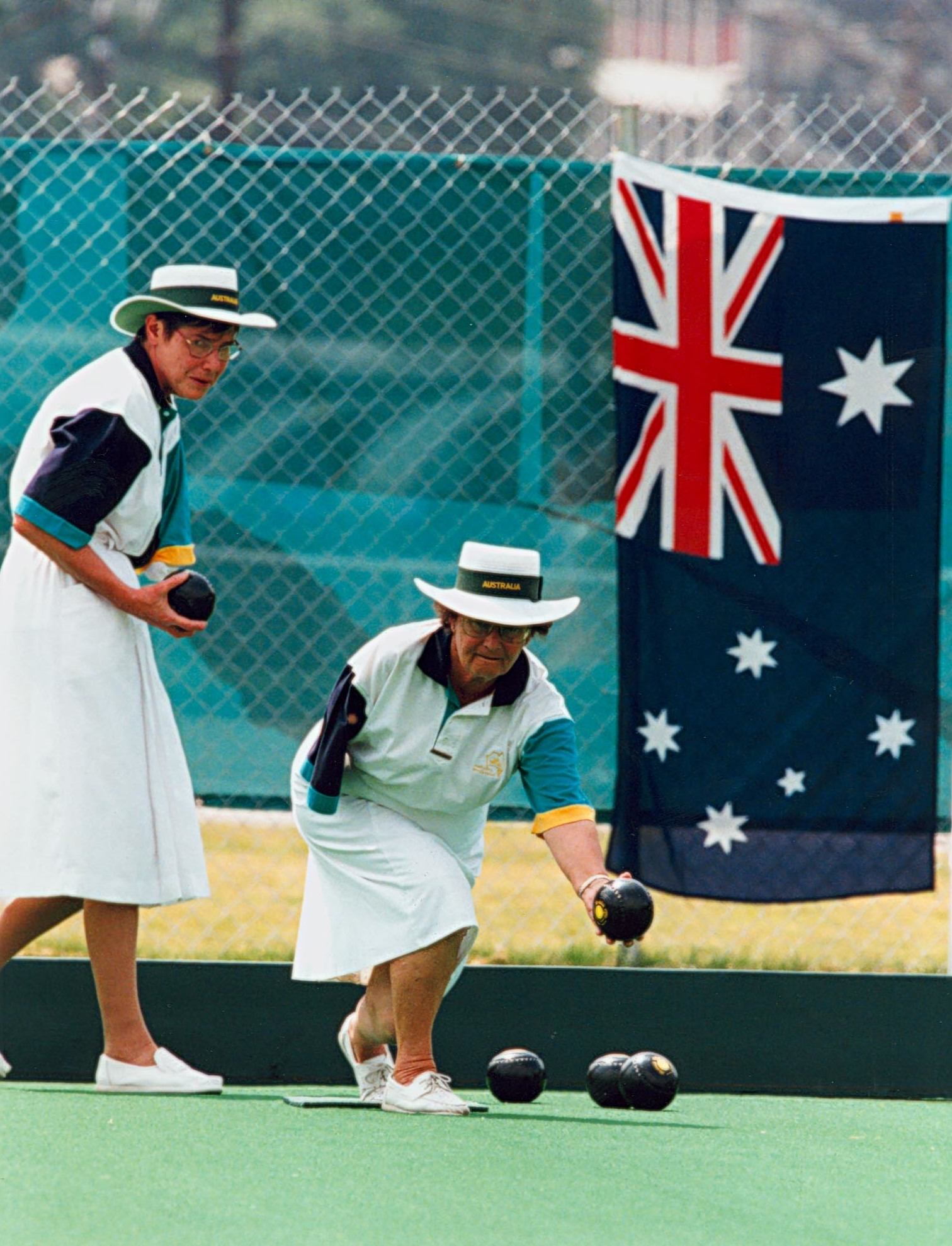
- Australian lawn bowlers Pauline Cahill and June Clark at the 1996 Atlanta Paralympic Games.

Personal information
- Nationality: Australia
- Born: 20 October 1929
- Died: March 2023
Medal record
Lawn bowls
Paralympic Games
Bronze medal – third place	1996 Atlanta	Women's Singles LB3–5

Pauline Cahill (20 October 1929 – March 2023) was a Paralympic lawn bowls competitor from Australia. She won a bronze medal at the 1996 Atlanta Games in the Women's Singles LB3–5 event.
