= Grant Fitzpatrick =

Australian Paralympic swimmer

Personal information
- Nationality: Australia
- Born: 18 March 1976 (age 50) Blacktown, New South Wales
Medal record
Swimming
Paralympic Games
Silver medal – second place	1996 Atlanta	Men's 100 m Freestyle MH
Silver medal – second place	1996 Atlanta	Men's 50 m Freestyle MH

Grant Fitzpatrick (born 18 March 1976) is an Australian Paralympic swimmer with an intellectual disability. He was born in the Sydney suburb of Blacktown. He won two silver medals at the 1996 Atlanta Games in the Men's 100 m Freestyle MH and Men's 50 m Freestyle MH events. He had an Australian Institute of Sport Athlete with a Disability scholarship in 1996. In 1996, he was named Blacktown City Council's Sportsperson of the Year.
