= June Clark (bowls) =

Australian Paralympic lawn bowls player (born 1939)

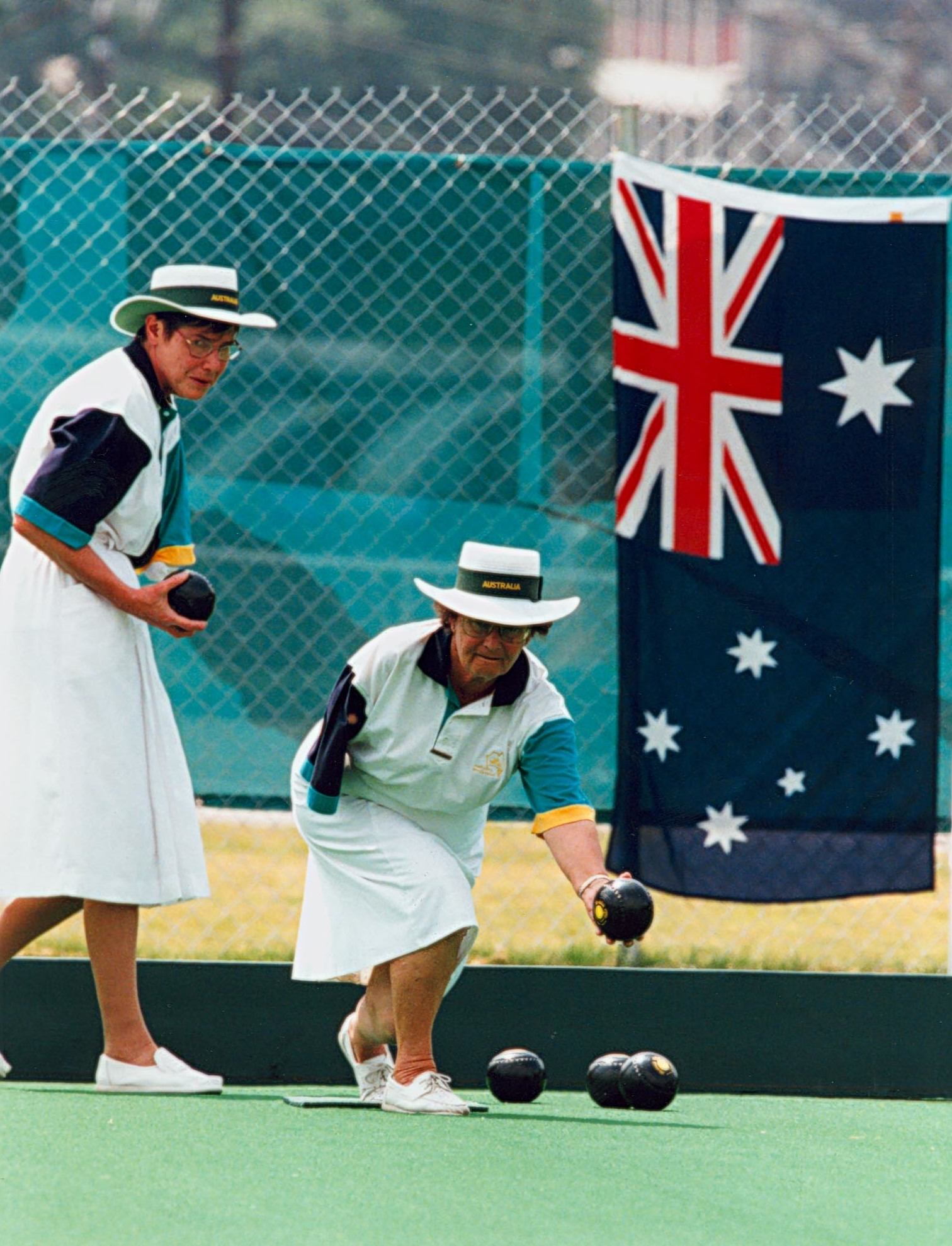
- Australian lawn bowlers Pauline Cahill and June Clark at the 1996 Atlanta Paralympic Games.

Personal information
- Nationality: Australia
- Born: 23 June 1939 (age 87) Kent, England
Medal record
Lawn bowls
Paralympic Games
Silver medal – second place	1996 Atlanta	women's singles LB3-5

June Clark (born 23 June 1939) is an Australian Paralympic lawn bowls player. She was born in Kent, England. She won a silver medal at the 1996 Atlanta Games in the women's singles LB3-5 event.
