= Petrea Barker =

Australian Paralympic swimmer

Personal information
- Nationality: Australia
- Born: 18 September 1975 (age 50)
Medal record
Swimming
Paralympic Games
Bronze medal – third place	1996 Atlanta	Women's 100 m Freestyle MH
IPC Swimming World Championships
Gold medal – first place	1994 Valletta	50 m Butterfly S14
Silver medal – second place	1994 Valletta	100 m Freestyle S14
Silver medal – second place	1994 Valletta	50 m Backstroke S14
Gold medal – first place	1998 Christchurch	4 x 100 m Freestyle S14
Gold medal – first place	1998 Christchurch	4 x 50 m Medley S14

Petrea Barker (born 18 September 1975) is a Paralympic swimming competitor from Australia. She won a bronze medal at the 1996 Atlanta Games in the Women's 100 m Freestyle MH event. She was born on 18 September 1975. She was an Australian Institute of Sport scholarship holder from 1998 to 1999.
