= Carla Sullivan =

Australian Paralympic swimmer

Personal information
- Nationality: Australia
- Born: 19 March 1976 (age 50) Camperdown, New South Wales
Medal record
Swimming
Paralympic Games
Silver medal – second place	1996 Atlanta	Women's 100 m Freestyle MH

Carla Sullivan (born 19 March 1976) is a Paralympic swimming competitor from Australia. She was born in the Sydney suburb of Camperdown. She won a silver medal at the 1996 Atlanta Games in the Women's 100 m Freestyle MH event.
