= Australia at the 1988 Summer Paralympics =

- IPC code: AUS
- NPC: Australian Paralympic Committee
- Website: www.paralympic.org.au

in Seoul
- Competitors: 179 in 16 sports
- Flag bearer: Paul Croft (Opening) Rodney Nugent (Closing)
- Officials: 47
- Medals Ranked 10th: Gold 23 Silver 34 Bronze 38 Total 95

Summer Paralympics appearances (overview)
- 1960; 1964; 1968; 1972; 1976; 1980; 1984; 1988; 1992; 1996; 2000; 2004; 2008; 2012; 2016; 2020; 2024

Australia competed at the 1988 Summer Paralympics in Seoul, South Korea in 16 sports, winning medals in 6 sports. Gold medals were won in three sports – athletics, lawn bowls and swimming. Australia won 95 medals – 23 gold, 34 silver and 38 bronze medals. Australia finished 10th on the gold medal table and 7th on the combined medal table. Australian Confederation of Sports for the Disabled reported another medal ranking after Games with Australia being 2nd ranked in amputee sports, 8th in wheelchair sports, 11th in blind sports and 12th in cerebral palsy sports.

Notable Australian performances included:

- Rodney Nugent, an arm amputee, won 4 gold medals and 3 bronze medals in athletics
- Elizabeth Kosmala, a wheelchair shooter, won 3 gold medals and 1 silver medal
- Dual individual gold medallists included: amputee swimmer Greg Hammond, amputee swimmer Judith Young, vision impaired thrower Russell Short and wheelchair thrower Bruce Wallrodt

Australian athletes broke eight world records.

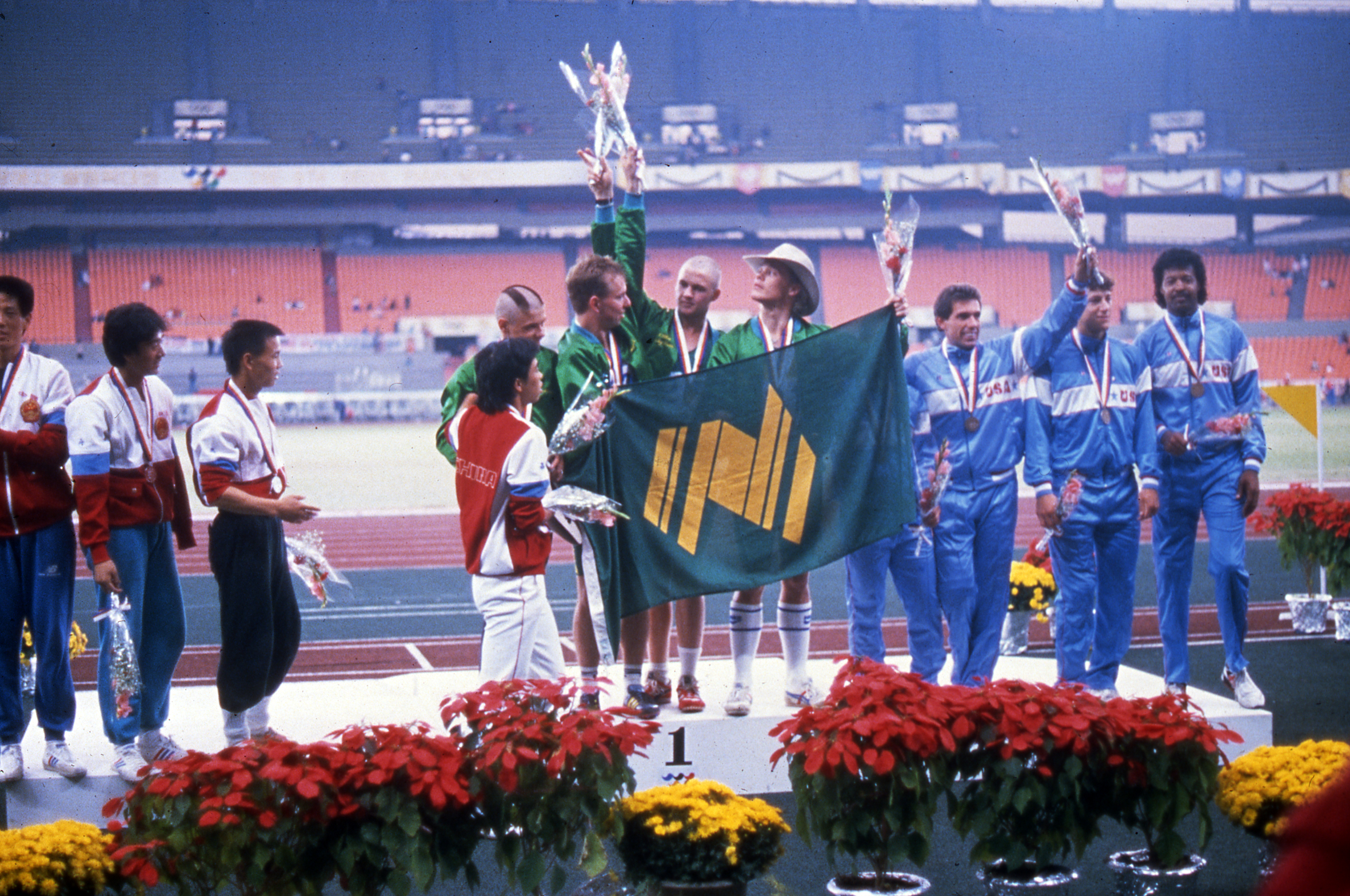
Members of the Australian 4 × 100 m amputee relay during the medal ceremony at the 1988 Seoul Paralympic Games

== Background ==
The 1988 Summer Paralympics were the first Paralympic Games to be held under the aegis of the International Co-ordinating Committee (ICC). The ICC was accepted into the Olympic Family, which allowed greater co-operation by National Olympic Committees in regards to the organization of Paralympic Games. The Seoul Olympic Organizing Committee (SLOOC) regarded the Paralympic Games as an extension of the Olympic Games and formulated a support plan which allowed sharing of Seoul Olympic manpower, facilities, equipment, and sharing of key personnel. The SLOOC gave a subsidy of $12,857,143 US dollars. It was not possible to use the Olympic Village so a new Paralympic Village, consisting of 10 apartment blocks, was created, providing catering, recreation, banking, post office facilities, medical centres, religious centres, and a shopping mall. The 1988 Seoul Paralympic Games was also the first time both the Olympics and Paralympics used the same venues, and since then, every Winter and Summer Paralympic Games have been held in the same city as the Olympic Games.

The Seoul Paralympic Organizing Committee (SPOC) designed the first Paralympic Symbol which was used from 1988–1994. The Five 'teardrops' in the 'W' configuration and colours of the Olympic rings represented the five oceans and the five continents. This symbol was eventually changed in 1994, as it was considered to be too close to the International Olympic Committee's (IOC) 5-ring emblem. The 1988 Seoul Paralympic Games is considered as the genesis of the Modern Paralympic Games.

== Opening ceremony ==
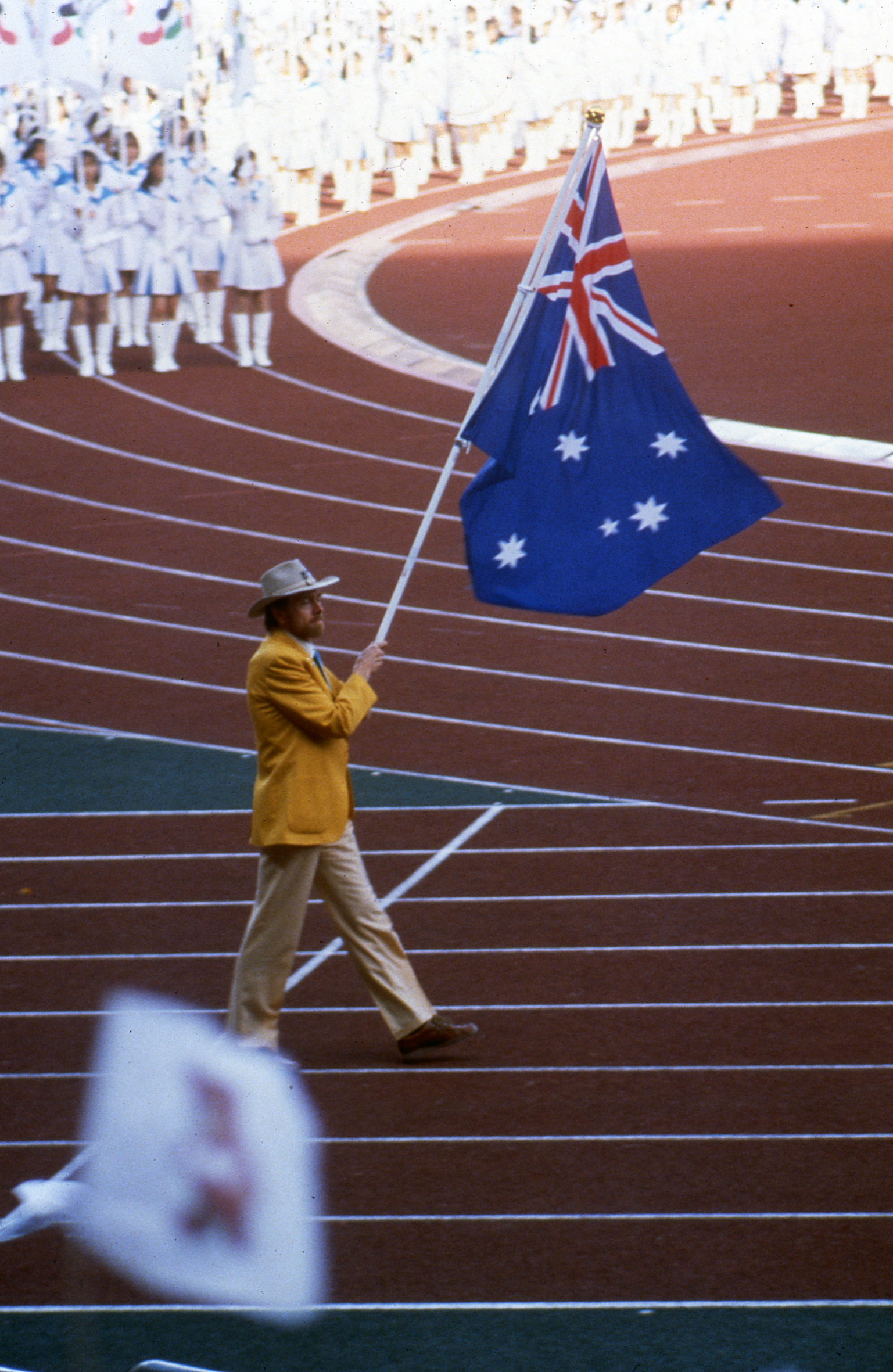
Flag bearer Paul Croft at the opening ceremony

During the opening ceremony there were more than 75,000 people within the Olympic Stadium with a then record of 3,057 competitors from 61 nations. The president of South Korea, Roh Tae-Woo, presented the new Paralympic flag to the president of the ICC, Jens Bromann. Paul Croft, competing in his second Paralympic Games, was the flag bearer for Australia during the opening ceremony. Parachutists in the Paralympic colors of blue, black, red, yellow, and green swept down into the Olympic Stadium following a procession of children in wheelchairs. The Olympic Torch was carried in by a one-legged South Korean Paralympic volleyball player and handed to 19-year-old Cho Hyun-hui, a wheelchair-using athlete with cerebral palsy. Cho Hyun-hai was wheeled around the stadium by her 7-year-old daughter before handing the Torch to blind runner Lee Jae-oon, who linked hands with women's handball Olympic gold medalist Kiifi Hyun-mi, who together, were carried up by elevator platform to light the Olympic Flame.

Chief Paralympic Organiser Koh Kwi-nam addressed the athletes by saying "The goal you as athletes should try to reach for in the Games is not to accomplish the Olympic slogan of 'faster, higher and farther' but to show the world your real selves as courageous challengers, glorious conquerors and impartial participants."

== Controversies ==
The Seoul Paralympic Games were not without controversies. The Iranian goalball team were disqualified for refusing to play against the Israeli team. It was deemed that the Iranian team had misused the sporting platform for political aims by the ICC who made immediate arrangements to send the team home. Asghar Dadkhan, the Iranian team manager, made a formal statement of apology pledging that all other Iranian athletes would compete with full regard to the regulations and would compete against Israel and any other nation.

A Libyan team arrived at the Seoul Paralympic Games without having gone through the normal entry procedures. The SPOC urged the ICC to accept the Libyan team and a compromise was reach, permitting the Libyans to participate as observers. They could compete in the marathon event, however they would not have any medal entitlement, nor would they be officially recognized at the closing ceremony.

Twenty-seven athletes were incorrectly awarded medals after the first round of competition in the men's and women's wheelchair slalom event. The mistake was discovered when officials realised that the medals should not have been awarded until after a second round of competition.

== Team ==
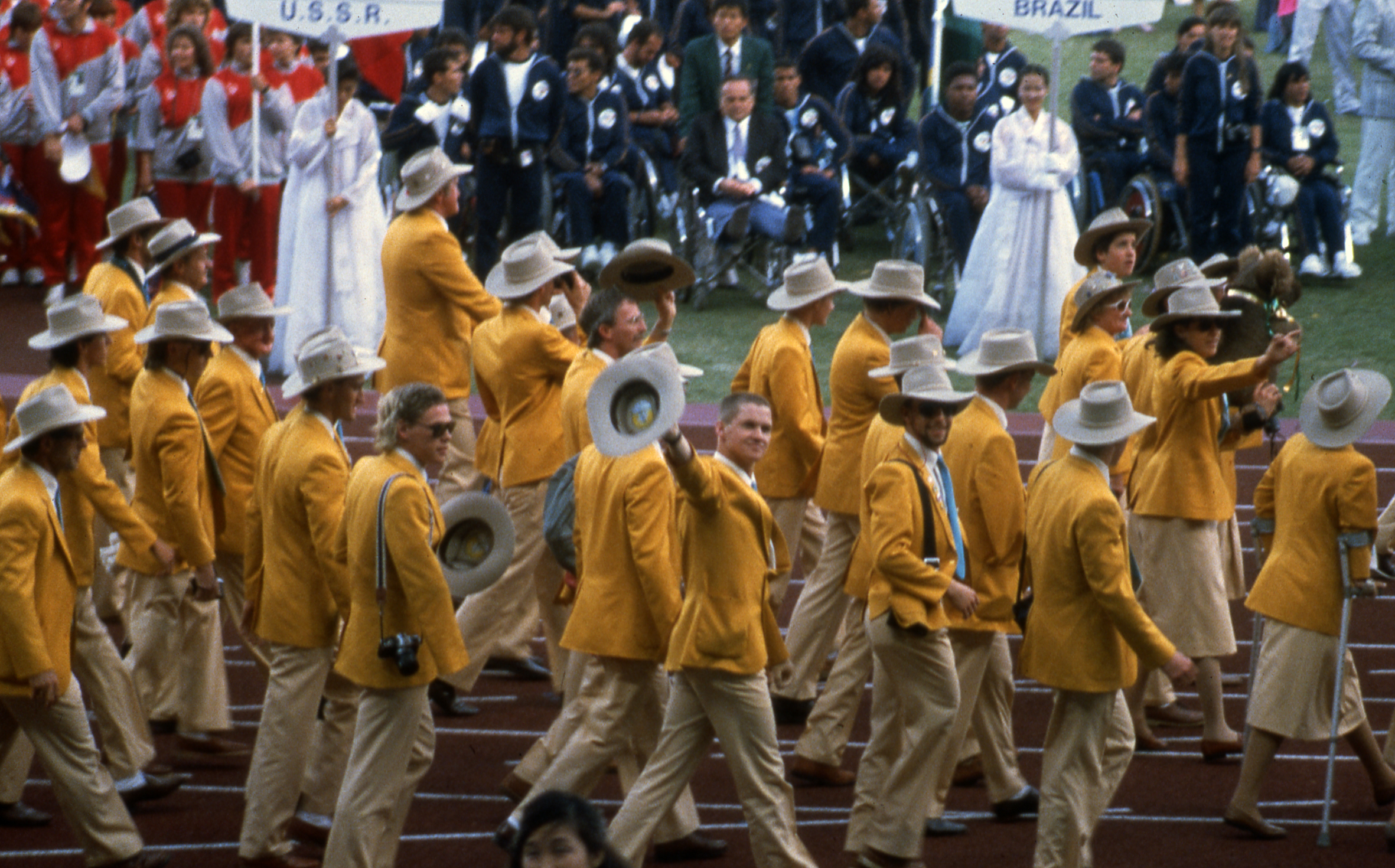
Australian team at the Opening Ceremony

Australia sent a team of 179 athletes and 47 staff and escorts. The Australian Confederation of Sports for the Disabled Inc took responsibility for team management and fundraising. The team was organised by disability athlete categories – amputee, blind, cerebral palsy, wheelchair (paraplegic and quadriplegic).

=== Team management ===
The Australian team was organised by disability classifications as the Games team was organised by the Australian Confederation of Sports for the Disabled Inc.

Overall – Rhys Roberts (General Manager), Nigel Rouse (Assistant General Manager), Dr John Bourke (Medical Director), Dominic Wall (Sport Coordinator), David Douglas (Publicity Director)
Section Managers- Wally Parsons (Amputee), Gary Prior (Blind), Judy Hill (Cerebral palsy), George Dunstan (Wheelchair)
State Management – each Australian state provided team officials:
Australian Capital Territory – overall – Dominic Wall; wheelchair officials – M. Trewella, G. Walker
New South Wales – Amputee officials – D. Beath, T. Beath, Vic Renalson; blind officials – L. Alder, T. Keneghan, J. Stephenson, S. Jackson; cerebral palsy officials – A. Gregson, Tom Organ, S. Streat; wheelchair officials – Michael Godfrey-Roberts, M. Bevan, C. Jarvis
Queensland – amputee officials – Paul Bird, Henry Shorter; blind officials – D. Beavis, J. Buckley; cerebral palsy officials – A. Allan, A. Brindley, Karen Denman; wheelchair officials – S. Hyde
South Australia – overall – R. Roberts; amputee officials – P. Aldridge, M. Parsons, W. Parsons; wheelchair officials – Kevin Bawden, George Dunstan, G. Gould, G. Maloney, M. Wardrop
Northern Territory – overall – N. Rouse; blind official – B. Killalea
Tasmania – wheelchair official – G. Vince
Victoria – overall – John Bourke; amputee official – P. Negropontis; blind officials – J. Coole, E. O'Meagher; wheelchair officials – Kathryn Lee, D. Perriman, J. Sayers
Western Australia – blind official – G. Prior; cerebral palsy officials – G. Carter, D. Hancy, J. Hill, P. Jose, B. Lake, M. Chan; wheelchair official – Norma Beer

The team captain was Paul Croft, who carried the flag at the opening ceremony, and Mike Nugent was the vice captain.

=== Fundraising ===
The Australian Confederation of Sports for the Disabled Inc undertook a range of fundraising activities to raise A$2 million of which A$1.w million would be used to send teams to the 1988 Seoul Summer and Innsbruck Winter Games. The remainder of the funds would be used for future Games. The cash amount finally raised was A$1,104,328. There were also considerable "in kind" donations covering accommodation, marketing, travel.

== Medalists ==
Medal	Name	Sport	Event
Gold	David Goodman	Athletics	Men's 100 m B3
Gold	Brad Hill	Athletics	Men's 200 m C7
Gold	Robert Biancucci	Athletics	Men's 800 m C8
Gold	Adrian Lowe, Rodney Nugent, Nigel Parsons, Jason Smart	Athletics	Men's 4 × 100 m relay A2/A4–7
Gold	Adrian Lowe, Rodney Nugent, Andrew O'Sullivan, Nigel Parsons	Athletics	Men's 4 × 400 m relay A2/A4–7
Gold	Rodney Nugent	Athletics	Men's Long jump A6/A8–9/L6
Gold	Rodney Nugent	Athletics	Men's Triple jump A6/A8–9/L6
Gold	Kerrod McGregor	Athletics	Men's Discus throw A2/A9
Gold	Russell Short	Athletics	Men's Discus throw B3
Gold	Russell Short	Athletics	Men's Javelin throw B3
Gold	Bruce Wallrodt	Athletics	Men's Javelin throw 2
Gold	Bruce Wallrodt	Athletics	Men's Shot put 2
Gold	Deahnne McIntyre	Athletics	Women's 200 m 5–6
Gold	Patricia Molseed	Athletics	Women's Shot put B1
Gold	Roy Fowler, Stan Kosmala	Lawn bowls	Men's pairs 2–6
Gold	Elizabeth Kosmala	Shooting	Women's Air rifle 3 positions 2–6
Gold	Elizabeth Kosmala	Shooting	Women's Air rifle kneeling 2–6
Gold	Elizabeth Kosmala	Shooting	Women's Air rifle prone 2–6
Gold	Greg Hammond	Swimming	Men's 100 m freestyle A8
Gold	Greg Hammond	Swimming	Men's 100 m breaststroke A8
Gold	Sandra Yaxley	Swimming	Women's 100 m freestyle C6
Gold	Judith Young	Swimming	Women's 400 m freestyle A8
Gold	Judith Young	Swimming	Women's 100 m backstroke A8
Silver	Vincenzo Vallelonga	Athletics	Men's 100 m 1B
Silver	Kerrod McGregor	Athletics	Men's 100 m A2/A9
Silver	Adrian Lowe	Athletics	Men's 100 m A4/A9
Silver	Adrian Lowe	Athletics	Men's 200 m A4/A9
Silver	Adrian Lowe	Athletics	Men's 400 m A4/A9
Silver	Brad Hill	Athletics	Men's 400 m C7
Silver	Robert Biancucci	Athletics	Men's 400 m C8
Silver	Alan Dufty	Athletics	Men's Marathon 1C
Silver	Richard Cordukes, Michael Desanto, Alan Dufty, Vincenzo Vallelonga	Athletics	Men's 4 × 100 m relay 1A–1C
Silver	Michael Hackett	Athletics	Men's High jump A4/A9
Silver	Terry Giddy	Athletics	Men's Discus throw 4
Silver	Bradley Thomas	Athletics	Men's Pentathlon A4/A9
Silver	Yvette McLellan	Athletics	Women's 400 m 2
Silver	Deahnne McIntyre	Athletics	Women's 400 m 5–6
Silver	Meredith Jones, Deahnne McIntyre, Yvette McLellan, Julie Russell	Athletics	Women's 4 × 400 m relay 2–6
Silver	Donna Smith	Athletics	Women's Javelin throw A6/A8-9/L6
Silver	Karen Gill	Athletics	Women's Javelin throw C3
Silver	Julie Russell	Athletics	Women's Shot put 3
Silver	Julie Russell	Athletics	Women's Pentathlon 3
Silver	David Boldery, Clifford Swann	Lawn bowls	Men's pairs LB2
Silver	Matthew Pobje	Powerlifting	Men's 100 kg
Silver	Elizabeth Kosmala	Shooting	Women's Air rifle standing 2–6
Silver	Phillip Tracey	Swimming	Men's 50 m freestyle 1A
Silver	Phillip Tracey	Swimming	Men's 100 m freestyle 1A
Silver	Phillip Tracey	Swimming	Men's 25 m backstroke 1A
Silver	Greg Hammond, Jason Diederich, Brendan Burkett, Leslie Beath	Swimming	Men's 4×50 m freestyle relay A1–A8
Silver	Sandra Yaxley	Swimming	Women's 50 m backstroke C6
Silver	Catherine Huggett	Swimming	Women's 100 m backstroke C3
Silver	Lyn Lillecrapp	Swimming	Women's 50 m breaststroke 2
Silver	Mandy Maywood	Swimming	Women's 50 m breaststroke B3
Silver	Judith Young	Swimming	Women's 100 m breaststroke A8
Silver	Judith Young	Swimming	Women's 100 m butterfly L6
Silver	Judith Young	Swimming	Women's 200 m individual medley L6
Silver	Anne Currie, Deborah Holland, Susan Knox, Judith Young	Swimming	Women's 4 × 100 m freestyle relay A–L
Bronze	Rodney Nugent	Athletics	Men's 100 m A6/A8–9/L4
Bronze	Rodney Nugent	Athletics	Men's 200 m A6/A8–9/L4
Bronze	Rodney Nugent	Athletics	Men's High jump A6/A8–9/L6
Bronze	Mike Nugent	Athletics	Men's 200 m 2
Bronze	Robert Biancucci	Athletics	Men's 200 m C8
Bronze	Andrew O’Sullivan	Athletics	Men's 400 m A4/A9
Bronze	Jason Walsh	Athletics	Men's 400 m B3
Bronze	Alan Dufty	Athletics	Men's 1500 m 1C
Bronze	Richard Cordukes, Michael Desanto, Alan Dufty, Vincenzo Vallelonga	Athletics	Men's 4 × 200 m relay 1A–1C
Bronze	Rodney Nugent	Athletics	Men's High jump A6/A8–9/L6
Bronze	Kerrod McGregor	Athletics	Men's Long jump A2/A9
Bronze	Kerrod McGregor	Athletics	Men's Javelin throw A2/A9
Bronze	Russell Short	Athletics	Men's Shot put B3
Bronze	Vincenzo Vallelonga	Athletics	Men's Slalom 1B
Bronze	Matthew van Eldik	Athletics	Men's Slalom C4–5
Bronze	Bruce Wallrodt	Athletics	Men's Discus throw 2
Bronze	Rene Ahrens	Athletics	Men's Discus throw 6
Bronze	John Eden	Athletics	Men's Discus throw A2/A9
Bronze	Deahnne McIntyre	Athletics	Women's 100 m 5–6
Bronze	Julie Russell	Athletics	Women's Discus throw 3
Bronze	Julie Russell	Athletics	Women's Javelin throw 3
Bronze	Neville Read	Lawn bowls	Men's singles 2–6
Bronze	John Forsberg	Lawn bowls	Men's singles LB3
Bronze	Michael Farrell	Powerlifting	Men's 100 kg
Bronze	David Griffin	Swimming	Men's 100 m freestyle A2
Bronze	David Griffin	Swimming	Men's 100 m butterfly A2
Bronze	Ralph Smith	Swimming	Men's 100 m freestyle A7
Bronze	Wayne Ryding	Swimming	Men's 400 m freestyle 5
Bronze	Kingsley Bugarin	Swimming	Men's 50 m breaststroke B3
Bronze	Kingsley Bugarin	Swimming	Men's 100 m breaststroke B3
Bronze	Kingsley Bugarin	Swimming	Men's 200 m breaststroke B3
Bronze	Lyn Lillecrapp	Swimming	Women's 50 m freestyle 2
Bronze	Lyn Lillecrapp	Swimming	Women's 50 m backstroke 2
Bronze	Lyn Lillecrapp	Swimming	Women's 25 m butterfly 2
Bronze	Susan Knox	Swimming	Women's 100 m backstroke A4
Bronze	Mandy Maywood	Swimming	Women's 100 m breaststroke B3
Bronze	Mandy Maywood	Swimming	Women's 200 m breaststroke B3
Bronze	Deborah Holland	Swimming	Women's 400 m freestyle A2
Bronze	Brian McNicholl	Weightlifting	Men's 85 kg

Medals by discipline
Discipline	Gold medal	Silver medal	Bronze medal	Total
Archery	0	0	0	0
Athletics	14	19	20	53
Boccia	0	0	0	0
Cycling	0	0	0	0
Wheelchair fencing	0	0	0	0
Football seven-a-side	0	0	0	0
Lawn bowls	1	1	2	4
Powerlifting	0	1	1	2
Shooting	3	1	0	4
Swimming	5	12	14	31
Table tennis	0	0	0	0
Volleyball	0	0	0	0
Weightlifting	0	0	1	1
Wheelchair basketball	0	0	0	0
Total	23	34	38	95

== Events ==
=== Archery ===
Selected team of 3 athletes.

Men	Women
Arthur Fisk, Eric Klein	Carolyn Burns

Australia did not win any medals.

Men

Athlete	Event	Result	Rank
Arthur Fisk	Men's Double FITA Round open	2207	24
Eric Klein	Men's Double FITA Round open	2150	28

Women

Athlete	Event	Result	Rank
Carolyn Burns	Women's Double FITA Round 2-6	2087	13

=== Athletics ===
Selected team of 73 athletes.

Men	Women
Rene Ahrens, Ian Aitchison, Robert Biancucci, Fabian Blattman, Peter Cliff, Darren Collins, Richard Cordukes, Paul Croft, Mark Davies, Michael Desanto, Phillip Deveraux, John Domanol, Alan Dufty, John Eden, Joe Egan, Craig Elliott, Shane Ellsmore, John Federico, Ian Gainey, Terry Giddy, David Goodman, Michael Hackett, Kevin Hamilton, Gary Hayes, Bradley Hill, Geoffrey Hill, Patrick Hughes, Matthew Jesse, Warren Lawton, John Lindsay, Adrian Lowe, Wayne Maher, Brett McArthur, Kerrod McGregor, Michael McIntyre, Warren McKennairey, Jeff McNeil, Mark Milne, Kieran Modra, Michael Nugent, Rodney Nugent, Andrew O’Sullivan, Nigel Parsons, Malcolm Richards, Sam Rickard, Jaime Romaguera, Edward Roos, Craig Sayers, Ralph Scott, Russell Short, Jason Smart, Bradley Thomas, Darren Thrupp, Ched Towns, Peter Trotter, Robert Turner, Vincenzo Vallelonga, Bruce Wallrodt, Jason Walsh, Ross Whyte, Jason Willis, Jeff Wiseman, Matthew van Eldik	Lynette Coleman, Karen Gill, Meredith Jones, Deahnne McIntyre, Yvette McLellan, Patricia Molseed, Julie Russell, Donna Smith, Katrina Vines

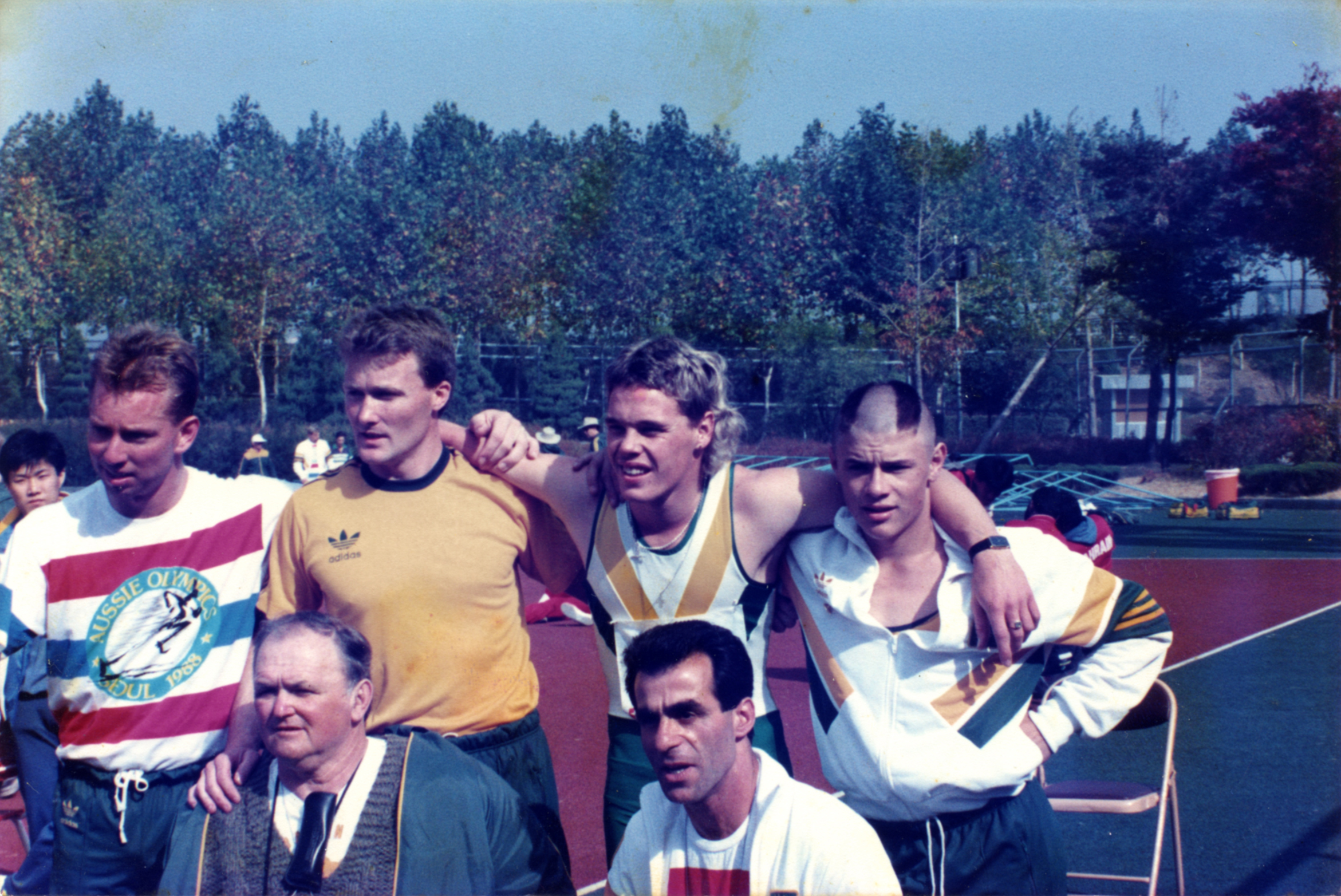
Australia's 4x400 gold medal relay team. Nigel Parsons (L), Andrew O'Sullivan, Rodney Nugent and Adrian Lowe (R) with coach Peter Negopontis (R front).

Athletics was Australia's most successful sport at the Games winning 53 medals – 14 gold, 19 silver and 20 bronze medals. 13 athletes won gold medals. Rodney Nugent won 4 gold medals, 3 bronze medals and set a world record of 6.72m in his long jump event. Four athletes came home with two gold medals – Adrian Lowe, Nigel Parsons, Russell Short and Bruce Wallrodt.

Deahnne McIntyre won a gold medal, two silver medals and a bronze medal, competing a week after undergoing an emergency appendectomy in a Seoul hospital. With doctors and officials telling her that she could not compete, McIntyre 'knew that she would be out there'. McIntyre came into the games as the world record holder for the Women's 200m 5-6 classification, which she eventually won the gold medal for.

Russell Short, a blind athlete, won two gold medals and a bronze medal. Short set a world record in his classification for javelin, making a throw of 54.72m.

Dubbed 'The Awesome Foursome', Australia's 4 × 400 m relay team set a world record time of 3 minutes 55 seconds, beating the previous record by 3.9 seconds and winning the race by 50 metres.

Patricia Molseed set a Paralympic Record of 8.82m in the Women's Shot Put B1 competition on her first throw despite suffering from a torn back muscle. Only able to make token efforts after her back gave out, her first throw was enough to clinch the gold medal.

==== Track events – men ====
Athlete	Event	Heat		Final	
Athlete	Event	Time	Rank	Time	Rank
Ian Aitchison	Men's 1,500 m 3	4:32.47	7	Did not advance	
Ian Aitchison	Men's 10,000 m 3	N/A		31:58.81	5
Ian Aitchison	Men's 5,000 m 3	N/A		16:23.13	10
Ian Aitchison	Men's Marathon 3	N/A		2:27:53	13
Robert Bancucci	Men's 1,500 m C8	N/A		4:55.76	5
Robert Bancucci	Men's 200 m C8	26.10 Q	2	25.60	3rd place, bronze medalist(s)
Robert Bancucci	Men's 800 m C8	2:15.32 Q	1	2:13.76	1st place, gold medalist(s)
Robert Bancucci	Men's 400 m C8	N/A		57.38	2nd place, silver medalist(s)
Fabian Blattman	Men's 200 m 1A	56.91	5	Did not advance	
Peter Cliff	Men's 5,000 m B1	N/A		18:57.15	8
Peter Cliff	Men's Marathon B1	N/A		3:06:28	6
Darren Collins	Men's 100 m B2	12.85	3	Did not advance	
Darren Collins	Men's 400 m B2	58.09	2	Did not advance	
Richard Cordukes	Men's 100 m 1A	N/A		26.34	7
Richard Cordukes	Men's 200 m 1A	55.12 Q	4	53.90	8
Paul Croft	Men's 10,000 m A6A8A9L4	N/A		40:18.96	6
Michael Desanto	Men's 1,500 m 1B	N/A		5:54.47	5
Michael Desanto	Men's 200 m 1B	45.39 Q	3	43.71	6
Michael Desanto	Men's 400 m 1B	1:31.63	6	Did not advance	
Phillip Deveraux	Men's 1,500 m B1	4:37.83 Q	2	4:18.45	4
Alan Dufty	Men's 100 m 1C	N/A		21.66	7
Alan Dufty	Men's 200 m 1C	41.97 Q	4	41.05	5
Alan Dufty	Men's 400 m 1C	1:24.73 Q	3	1:22.32	5
Alan Dufty	Men's 800 m 1C	N/A		2:52.03	6
Alan Dufty	Men's 1,500 m 1C	N/A		5:45.03	3rd place, bronze medalist(s)
Alan Dufty	Men's Marathon 1C	N/A		2:21:39	2nd place, silver medalist(s)
Joe Egan	Men's 100 m A4A9	13.39 Q	1	13.15	5
Joe Egan	Men's 200 m A4A9	28.46 Q	3	28.25	7
John Federico	Men's 200 m 5-6	33.82	3	Did not advance	
John Federico	Men's Slalom 5-6	N/A		2:28.3	9
Ian Gainey	Men's 1,500 m 3	4:32.47 Q	7	4:12.78	10
Ian Gainey	Men's 10,000 m 3	N/A		31:58.81	5
Ian Gainey	Men's 5,000 m 3	N/A		15:13.48	8
David Goodman	Men's 400 m B3	51.87 Q	1	53.91	8
David Goodman	Men's 100 m B3	11.41	1	11.63	1st place, gold medalist(s)
Wayne Haher	Men's 100 m C2	53.06	5	Did not advance	
Kevin Hamilton	Men's 400 m B1	56.97	3	Did not advance	
Bradley Hill	Men's 800 m C7	2:35.75	5	Did not advance	
Bradley Hill	Men's 200 m C7	26.45 Q	2	26.00	1st place, gold medalist(s)
Bradley Hill	Men's 400 m C7	N/A		58.41	2nd place, silver medalist(s)
Matthew Jesse	Men's 1,500 m B3	4:45.95 Q	3	4:36.59	7
John Lindsay	Men's 100 m 3	N/A		17.40	8
John Lindsay	Men's 200 m 3	33.40	3	Did not advance	
John Lindsay	Men's 400 m 3	1:05.41 Q	3	1:05.23	6
John Lindsay	Men's 800 m 3	2:18.80	6	Did not advance	
Adrian Lowe	Men's 100 m A4A9	12.72	2	12.37	2nd place, silver medalist(s)
Adrian Lowe	Men's 200 m A4A9	26.09 Q (WR)	1	25.86	2nd place, silver medalist(s)
Adrian Lowe	Men's 400 m A4A9	N/A		1:00.80	2nd place, silver medalist(s)
Brett McArthur	Men's 400 m 4	1:12.73	3	Did not advance	
Brett McArthur	Men's 800 m 4	2:19.94	5	Did not advance	
Kerrod McGregor	Men's 100 m A2A9	N/A		15.98	2nd place, silver medalist(s)
Michael McIntyre	Men's 100 m 4	18.01	7	Did not advance	
Michael McIntyre	Men's 200 m 4	34.49	2	Did not advance	
Michael McIntyre	Men's 400 m 4	1:11.80	4	Did not advance	
Warren McKennairey	Men's 400 m B2	57.08	4	Did not advance	
Jeff McNeill	Men's 5,000 m B2	N/A		16:59.79	6
Jeff McNeill	Men's Marathon B2	N/A		2:49:21	4
Kieran Modra	Men's 1,500 m B3	4:35.39	6	Did not advance	
Michael Nugent	Men's 1,500 m 2	4:19.81 Q	4	4:22.61	10
Michael Nugent	Men's 400 m 2	1:06.65 Q	4	1:07.44	8
Michael Nugent	Men's 800 m 2	2:14.38 Q	2	2:12.66	8
Michael Nugent	Men's Marathon 2	N/A		2:23:13	19
Michael Nugent	Men's 200 m 2	34.95 Q	1	34.65	3rd place, bronze medalist(s)
Rodney Nugent	Men's 100 m A6A8A9L4	11.70 Q	1	11.60	3rd place, bronze medalist(s)
Rodney Nugent	Men's 200 m A6A8A9L4	24.05 Q	1	23.61	3rd place, bronze medalist(s)
Andrew O'Sullivan	Men's 100 m A4A9	13.45 Q	4	13.47	7
Andrew O'Sullivan	Men's 200 m A4A9	28.24 Q	2	27.80	6
Andrew O'Sullivan	Men's 400 m A4A9	N/A		1:02.24	3rd place, bronze medalist(s)
Nigel Parsons	Men's 100 m A6A8A9L4	12.38	5	Did not advance	
Nigel Parsons	Men's 200 m A6A8A9L4	25.00 Q	2	24.92	7
Nigel Parsons	Men's 400 m A6A8A9L4	55.56 Q	5	56.53	7
Malcolm Richards	Men's 200 m C8	32.73	7	Did not advance	
Sam Rickard	Men's 400 m B3	54.67	5	Did not advance	
Sam Rickard	Men's 800 m B3	N/A		2:07.31	5
Jaime Romaguera	Men's 100 m C6	15.65	5	Did not advance	
Craig Sayers	Men's 1,500 m 3	4:17.90	6	Did not advance	
Craig Sayers	Men's 400 m 3	1:11.35	3	Did not advance	
Craig Sayers	Men's 800 m 3	2:22.99	7	Did not advance	
Jason Smart	Men's 100 m A6A8A9L4	12.56	5	Did not advance	
Darren Thrupp	Men's 100 m C8	N/A		12.75	4
Darren Thrupp	Men's 200 m C8	26.72 Q	3	26.35	5
Darren Thrupp	Men's 400 m C8	N/A		1:01.92	8
Peter Trotter	Men's 1,500 m 4	4:19.60	7	Did not advance	
Peter Trotter	Men's 5,000 m 4	15:18.86	4	Did not advance	
Peter Trotter	Men's Marathon 4	N/A		1:54:37	5
Robert Turner	Men's 1,500 m 2	4:52.21	8	Did not advance	
Robert Turner	Men's 800 m 2	2:39.88	5	Did not advance	
Vincenzo Vallelonga	Men's 200 m 1B	42.73 Q	3	41.97	5
Vincenzo Vallelonga	Men's 400 m 1B	1:33.69	5	Did not advance	
Vincenzo Vallelonga	Men's Salom 1B	N/A		2:33.9	3rd place, bronze medalist(s)
Vincenzo Vallelonga	Men's 100 m 1B	N/A		20.84	2nd place, silver medalist(s)
Jason Walsh	Men's 100 m B3	11.89 Q	4	12.13	7
Jason Walsh	Men's 400 m B3	52.90 Q	2	51.37	3rd place, bronze medalist(s)
Ross Whyte	Men's 800 m C8	2:31.88	7	Did not advance	
Ross Whyte	Men's Cross Country 5,000 m C8	N/A		21:36.9	8
Jeff Wiseman	Men's 1,500 m 4	4:22.75	4	Did not advance	
Jeff Wiseman	Men's 400 m 4	1:08.57	4	Did not advance	
Jeff Wiseman	Men's 800 m 4	2:10.04	4	Did not advance	
Jeff Wiseman	Men's Marathon 4	N/A		1:58:28	7
Matthew van Eldik	Men's Slalom C4-5	N/A		N/A	3rd place, bronze medalist(s)
Michael Desanto; Richard Cordukes; Alan Dufty; Vincenzo Vallelonga	Men's 4 × 100 m Relay 1A-1C	N/A		1:28.14	2nd place, silver medalist(s)
Michael Desanto Alan Dufty Richard Cordukes Vincenzo Vallelonga	Men's 4 × 200 m Relay 1A-1C	N/A		2:41.43	3rd place, bronze medalist(s)
Adrian Lowe Rodney Nugent; Nigel Parsons; Jason Smart	Men's 4 × 100 m Relay A2A4-7	N/A		47.08	1st place, gold medalist(s)
Nigel Parsons Andrew O'Sullivan; Adrian Lowe; Rodney Nugent	Men's 4 × 400 m Relay A2A4-7	N/A		3:55.27	1st place, gold medalist(s)

Track events – women

Athlete	Event	Heat		Final	
Athlete	Event	Time	Rank	Time	Rank
Lynette Coleman	Women's Slalom C1	N/A		3:36.44	4
Meredith Jones	Women's 1,500 m 3	N/A		5:47.07	6
Meredith Jones	Women's 100 m 3	N/A		21.83	8
Meredith Jones	Women's 200 m 3	44.12	4	Did not advance	
Meredith Jones	Women's 400 m 3	1:28.13 Q	4	1:27.99	6
Deahnne McIntyre	Women's 100 m 5-6	19.97 Q	2	19.93	3rd place, bronze medalist(s)
Deahnne McIntyre	Women's 200 m 5-6	N/A		40.36	1st place, gold medalist(s)
Deahnne McIntyre	Women's 400 m 5-6	N/A		1:18.44	2nd place, silver medalist(s)
Yvette McLellan	Women's 1,500 m 2	N/A		5:07.25	4
Yvette McLellan	Women's 5,000 m 2	N/A		17:18.22	5
Yvette McLellan	Women's 800 m 2	N/A		2:38.06	5
Yvette McLellan	Women's 400 m 2	1:19.84 Q	3	1:18.69	2nd place, silver medalist(s)
Katrina Vines	Women's 100 m C6	N/A		20.46	7
Yvette McLellan; Julie Russell; Meredith Jones; Deahnne McIntyre	Women's 4 × 400 m Relay 2-6	N/A		5:33.82	2nd place, silver medalist(s)

==== Field events – men ====
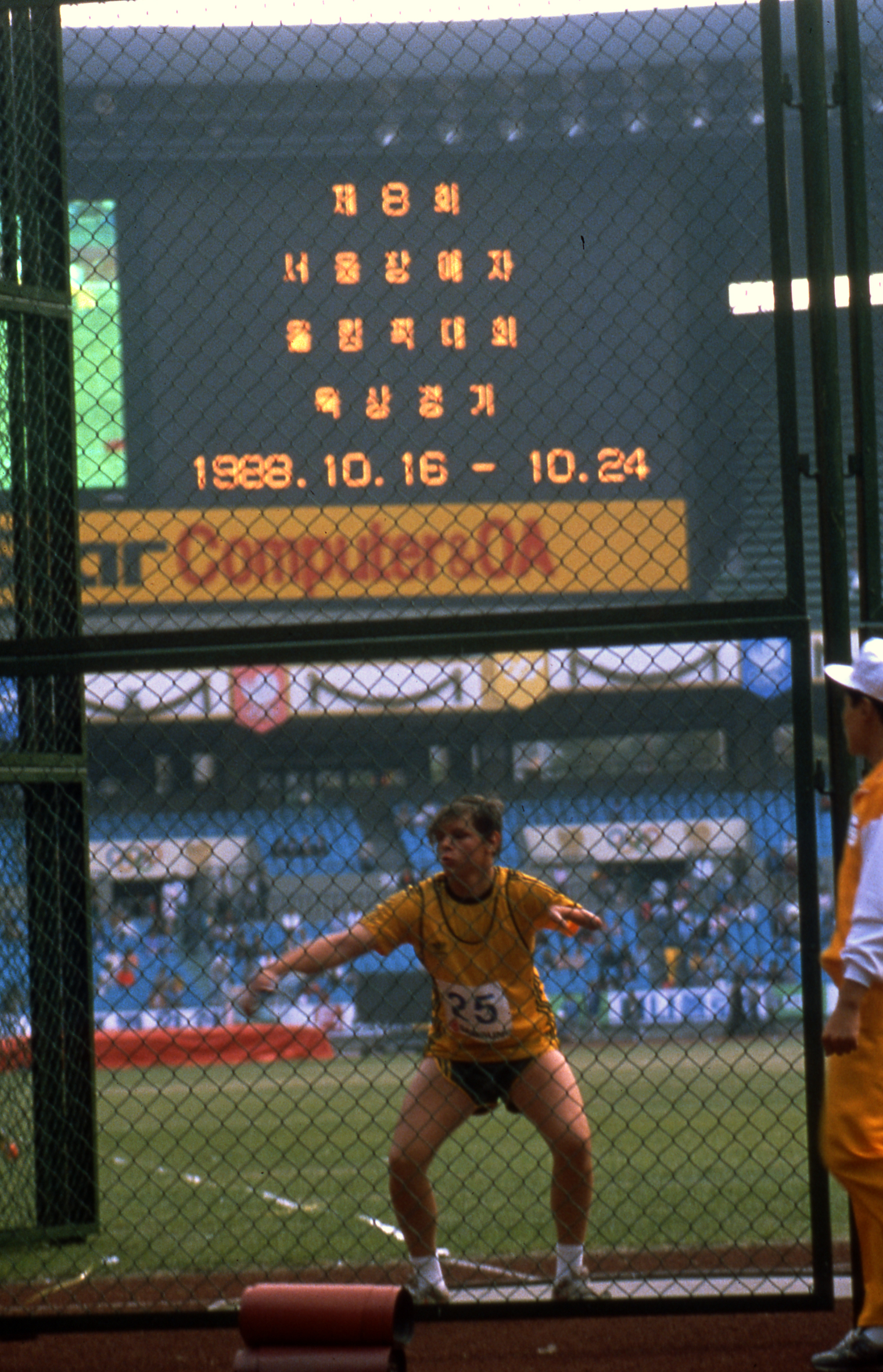
Australian discus competitor during the 1988 Seoul Paralympics

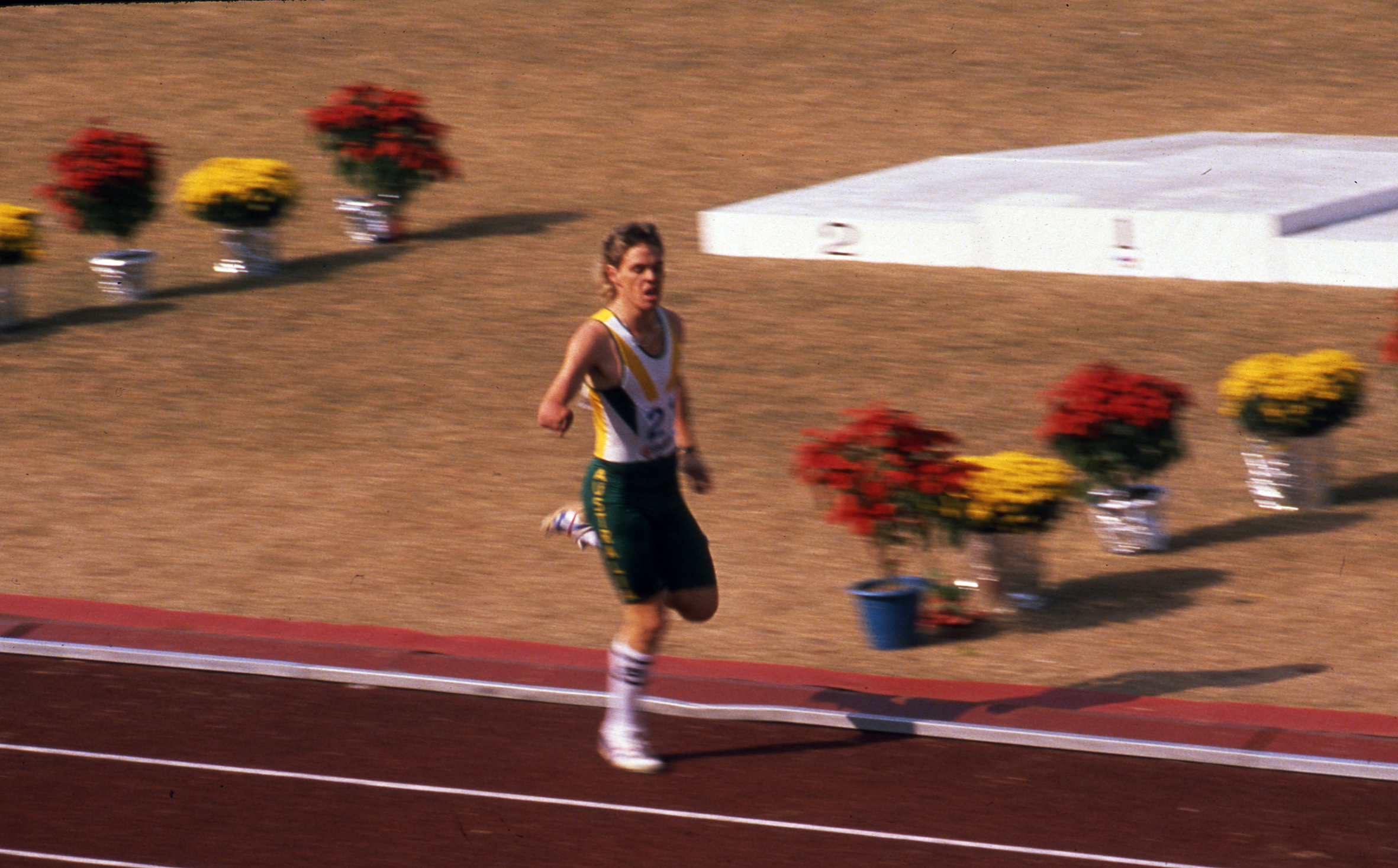
Rodney Nugent winner of 4 gold medals in Athletics

Athlete	Event	Result	Rank
Rene Ahrens	Men's Shot Put 6	12.87 m	4
Rene Ahrens	Men's Discus 6	40.44 m	3rd place, bronze medalist(s)
Mark Davies	Men's Javelin B2	40.40 m	4
Mark Davies	Men's Triple Jump B2	11.52 m	8
Phillip Deveraux	Men's Javelin B1	37.24 m	6
Phillip Deveraux	Men's Pentathlon B1	2044	4
John Domanol	Men's Pentathlon B3	2085	7
John Eden	Men's Discus A2A9	34.86 m	3rd place, bronze medalist(s)
Joe Egan	Men's Pentathlon A4A9	2828.12	5
Craig Elliott	Men's Javelin A2A9	34.58 m	6
Shane Ellsmore	Men's Discus C7	26.64 m	6
Terry Giddy	Men's Discus 4	34.82 m	2nd place, silver medalist(s)
David Goodman	Men's Pentathlon B3	1391	10
Michael Hackett	Men's High Jump A4A9	1.68 m	2nd place, silver medalist(s)
Gary Hayes	Men's Javelin A2A9	29.94 m	8
Geoffrey Hill	Men's Discus C5	24.24 m	8
Warren Lawton	Men's High Jump B3	1.63 m	8
Warren Lawton	Men's Triple Jump B3	10.80 m	8
Wayne Maher	Men's Kick Ball C2	15.03	4
Kerrod McGregor	Men's High Jump A2A9	1.64 m	9
Kerrod McGregor	Men's Javelin A2A9	41.50 m	3rd place, bronze medalist(s)
Kerrod McGregor	Men's Long Jump A2A9	4.25 m	3rd place, bronze medalist(s)
Kerrod McGregor	Men's Discus A2A9	37.28 m PR	1st place, gold medalist(s)
Marko Milne	Men's Shot Put C8	7.74 m	6
Kieran Modra	Men's Javelin B3	44.40 m	6
Rodney Nugent	Men's High Jump A6A8A9L6	1.79 m	3rd place, bronze medalist(s)
Rodney Nugent	Men's Long Jump A6A8A9L6	6.72 m WR	1st place, gold medalist(s)
Rodney Nugent	Men's Triple Jump A6A8A9L6	12.97 m	1st place, gold medalist(s)
Sam Rickard	Men's High Jump B3	1.60 m	9
Edward Roos	Men's Discus A6A8A9L6	37.86 m	5
Edward Roos	Men's Shot Put A6A8A9L6	10.63 m	8
Ralph Scott	Men's Club Throw C6	37.14 m	4
Russell Short	Men's Shot Put B3	11.59 m	3rd place, bronze medalist(s)
Russell Short	Men's Discus B3	40.18 m	1st place, gold medalist(s)
Russell Short	Men's Javelin B3	54.72 m WR	1st place, gold medalist(s)
Jason Smart	Men's High Jump A6A8A9L6	1.76 m	4
Jason Smart	Men's Javelin A6A8A9L6	36.34 m	7
Bradley Thomas	Men's Javelin A4A9	38.08 m	6
Bradley Thomas	Men's Long Jump A4A9	4.95 m	5
Bradley Thomas	Men's Pentathlon A4A9	3286.56	2nd place, silver medalist(s)
Ched Towns	Men's Javelin B2	40.16 m	5
Bruce Wallrodt	Men's Discus 2	22.30 m	3rd place, bronze medalist(s)
Bruce Wallrodt	Men's Javelin 2	24.32 m PR	1st place, gold medalist(s)
Bruce Wallrodt	Men's Shot Put 2	7.83 m	1st place, gold medalist(s)
Jason Walsh	Men's Long Jump B3	5.76 m	7
Jason Willis	Men's Discus A3A9	28.30 m	4
Jason Willis	Men's Javelin A3A9	33.14 m	4
Jason Willis	Men's Shot Put A3A9	6.77 m	6
Matthew van Eldik	Men's Discus C4	16.16 m	7

==== Field events – women ====
Athlete	Event	Result	Rank
Lynette Coleman	Women's Precision Throw C1	80 m	6
Karen Gill	Women's Shot Put C3	2.75 m	4
Karen Gill	Women's Javelin C3	5.84 m	2nd place, silver medalist(s)
Patricia Molseed	Women's Shot Put B1	8.82 m PR	1st place, gold medalist(s)
Julie Russell	Women's Discus 3	14.80 m	3rd place, bronze medalist(s)
Julie Russell	Women's Javelin 3	12.76 m	3rd place, bronze medalist(s)
Julie Russell	Women's Pentathlon 3	4034.75	2nd place, silver medalist(s)
Julie Russell	Women's Shot Put 3	5.18 m	2nd place, silver medalist(s)
Donna Smith	Women's Discus A6A8A9L6	20.06 m	4
Donna Smith	Women's Javelin A6A8A9L6	27.80 m	2nd place, silver medalist(s)

Results key

- Note – Ranks given for track events are within the athlete's heat only
- Q = Qualified for the next round
- WR = World record
- PR = Paralympic record
- N/A = Round not applicable for the event

=== Boccia ===
Selected team of 4 athletes.

Men	Women
Burke Gibbons, Murray Parker, Donald Turton	Lynette Coleman

Australia did not win any medals.

Event	Athlete	Pool play		Quarter-finals	Semi-finals	Final	Rank
Event	Athlete	W-L	Rank	Opposition Result	Opposition Result	Opposition Result	Rank
Mixed Individual C1	Lynette Coleman	0-3	4	Did not advance			
Mixed Individual C2	Burke Gibbons	1-2	3	Did not advance			
Mixed Individual C2	Murray Parker	2-1	2	(South Korea) Lee (KOR) L 0:7	Did not advance		
Mixed Individual C2	Donald Turton	0-3	4	Did not advance			
Mixed Team C1-C2	Lynette Coleman Murray Parker; Burke Gibbons	1-2	3	Did not advance			

=== Cycling ===
Selected team of 1 athlete.

Men
Gregory Caines

Australia did not win any medals.

Athlete	Event	Result	Rank
Gregory Caines	Men's 60 km LC3	1:40:31.69	4

=== Football 7-a-side ===
The Football 7-a-side tournament was made up of 5 teams competing in a round robin tournament. Australia selected team of 9 athletes.

Australian Team
Shane Ellsmore, Lee Gordon, Geoffrey Hill, Mark Milne, David Pearson, Jaime Romaguera, Christopher Scott, Ralph Scott, Ross Whyte

Australia lost to the Netherlands 18-1, lost to Belgium 6-1, lost to Ireland 5–1 and lost to Korea 4-0. Australia did not win a medal.

Round Robin Tournament

Team	Pld	W	L	Goals (F:A)	Points
Netherlands (gold)	4	4	0	31:2	8
Belgium (silver)	4	3	1	11:5	6
Ireland (bronze)	4	2	2	10:5	4
Korea	4	1	3	5:15	2
Australia	4	0	4	3:33	0

=== Goalball ===
Australia represented by:

Australian men's team
Theo Bottom, Robert Crestani, Russell Doyle, Kevin Frew, Gary Sargent, Tony Telfer. Coach: Terry Kenaghan

Australian men's results were – defeated Denmark 1-0, defeated South Korea 5-4, lost to Yugoslavia 0-1, lost to USA 2-3, lost to Italy 0-1, defeated Bulgaria 3-2 and lost to Canada 4-5. Australia beat the Netherlands in the 11th place playoff game.

Australian women's team
Margaret Booth, Heather Gleeson, Marilyn Mills, Robyn Stephens, Jodi Willis, Susanne Wilson. Coach: Eileen O'Meagher

Australian women's results were – defeated Great Britain 3-0, lost to Germany 2-6, lost to United States 0-6, lost to Denmark 0-4, lost to Netherlands 1-5, lost to 2-5 Canada and lost to South Korea 4-5.

Australia did not win any medals.

Qualified for 2nd round
Eliminated

Men

Team	Pld	W	D	L	PF	PA	PD	Pts
Yugoslavia	7	5	1	1	10	5	+5	11
USA	7	5	1	1	14	5	+9	11
Italy	7	4	0	3	14	9	+5	8
Bulgaria	7	3	2	2	14	7	+7	8
Canada	7	4	0	3	22	13	+9	8
Australia	7	3	0	4	14	14	0	6
Denmark	7	1	2	4	1	9	-8	4
Korea	7	0	0	7	5	32	-27	0

Qualified for semifinals
Eliminated

Women

Team	Pld	W	D	L	PF	PA	PD	Pts
USA	7	7	0	0	26	0	+26	14
Denmark	7	4	2	1	27	3	+24	10
Netherlands	7	3	3	1	29	10	+19	9
Canada	7	4	1	2	18	13	+5	9
Germany	7	3	2	2	29	11	+18	8
Korea	7	2	0	5	12	40	-28	4
Australia	7	1	0	6	12	29	-17	2
Great Britain	7	0	0	7	9	56	-47	0

=== Lawn Bowls ===
Selected team of 11 athletes.

Men
David Boldery, David Doueal, John Forsberg, Roy Fowler, Ronald Gilshenan, Glen Hoffman, Stan Kosmala, Peter Magee, Max Peterson, Neville Read, Clifford Swann

Australia won 1 gold medal, 1 silver medal and 2 bronze medals. Roy Fowler was competing in his sixth Paralympic Games, winning his 10th medal.

Athlete	Event	Pool play		Semi-final	Final / BM	Rank
Athlete	Event	W-D-L	Rank	Opposition Result	Opposition Result	Rank
David Boldery Clifford Swann	Men's Pairs LB2	3-1-1	2	N/A		2nd place, silver medalist(s)
David Doueal	Men's Singles LB1	3-0-1	1	N/A	Chang Bok Lee (KOR) L 11-21	4
John Forsberg	Men's Singles LB3	1-0-2	3	N/A	Robert Love (GBR) W 21-9	3rd place, bronze medalist(s)
Roy Fowler Stan Kosmala	Men's Pairs 2-6	3-0-1	1	N/A		1st place, gold medalist(s)
Ronal Gilshenan	Men's Singles LB3	1-0-2	2	N/A	Did not advance	
Glen Hoffman	Men's Singles LB3	1-0-2	3	N/A	Did not advance	
Peter Magee	Men's Singles 2-6	1-0-2	3	Did not advance		
Max Peterson	Men's Singles 2-6	1-0-3	4	Did not advance		
Neville Read	Men's Singles 2-6	3-0-0	1	Ken Bridgeman (GBR) L 12-21	Sin Nam Song (KOR) W 21-17	3rd place, bronze medalist(s)

=== Powerlifting ===
Australia were represented by two athletes, Matthew Pobje and Michael Farrell who won silver and bronze respectively.

Event	Athlete	Result	Rank
Men's Up to 100 kg	Matthew Pobje	160 kg	2nd place, silver medalist(s)
Men's Up to 100 kg	Michael Farrell	150 kg	3rd place, bronze medalist(s)

=== Shooting ===
Selected team of 8 athletes.

Men	Women
Robert Bakker, Keith Bremner, Allan Chadwick, Andrew Rambow, Stanley Sims, Grant Walker	Barbara Caspers, Elizabeth Kosmala

Elizabeth Kosmala won all Australia's shooting medals – 3 gold medals and one silver medal.

Men

Athlete	Event	Score	Rank
Robert Bakker	Men's Air Pistol Standing LSH2	546	10
Keith Bremner	Men's Air Pistol 2-6	521	20
Keith Bremner	Men's Air Rifle 3 Positions 2-6	1076	33
Keith Bremner	Men's Air Rifle Kneeling 2-6	370	36
Keith Bremner	Men's Air Rifle Standing 2-6	329	34
Keith Bremner	Mixed Air Rifle Prone 2-6	377	36
Allan Chadwick	Men's Air Rifle 2 Positions with Aids 1A-1C	780	4
Allan Chadwick	Men's Air Rifle Kneeling with Aids 1A-1C	393	4
Allan Chadwick	Men's Air Rifle Prone with Aids 1A-1C	387	6
Andrew Rambow	Men's Air Rifle 3 Positions 2-6	1109	31
Andrew Rambow	Men's Air Rifle Kneeling 2-6	385	26
Andrew Rambow	Men's Air Rifle Standing 2-6	339	32
Andrew Rambow	Mixed Air Rifle Prone 2-6	385	33
Stanley Simms	Men's Air Pistol Standing LSH2	538	16
Grant Walker	Men's Air Rifle 2 Positions with Aids 1A-1C	770	6
Grant Walker	Men's Air Rifle Kneeling with Aids 1A-1C	386	7
Grant Walker	Men's Air Rifle Prone with Aids 1A-1C	384	8

Women

Event	Athlete	Score	Rank
Barbara Caspers	Women's Air Rifle 3 Positions 2-6	1116	12
Barbara Caspers	Women's Air Rifle Kneeling 2-6	385	8
Barbara Caspers	Women's Air Rifle Prone 2-6	382	13
Barbara Caspers	Women's Air Rifle Standing 2-6	349	12
Elizabeth Kosmala	Women's Air Rifle 3 Positions 2-6	1171	1st place, gold medalist(s)
Elizabeth Kosmala	Women's Air Rifle Kneeling 2-6	395	1st place, gold medalist(s)
Elizabeth Kosmala	Women's Air Rifle Prone 2-6	395	1st place, gold medalist(s)
Elizabeth Kosmala	Women's Air Rifle Standing 2-6	381	2nd place, silver medalist(s)
Elizabeth Kosmala	Mixed Air Rifle Prone 2-6	395	15

Team

Athlete	Event	Score	Rank
Keith Bremner	Mixed Air Rifle 3 Positions Team 2-6	3356	12
Elizabeth Kosmala	Mixed Air Rifle 3 Positions Team 2-6	3356	12
Andrew Rambow	Mixed Air Rifle 3 Positions Team 2-6	3356	12
Keith Bremner	Mixed Air Rifle Kneeling Team 2-6	1150	10
Elizabeth Kosmala	Mixed Air Rifle Kneeling Team 2-6	1150	10
Andrew Rambow	Mixed Air Rifle Kneeling Team 2-6	1150	10
Keith Bremner	Mixed Air Rifle Prone Team 2-6	1157	12
Elizabeth Kosmala	Mixed Air Rifle Prone Team 2-6	1157	12
Andrew Rambow	Mixed Air Rifle Prone Team 2-6	1157	12
Keith Bremner	Mixed Air Rifle Standing Team 2-6	1049	12
Elizabeth Kosmala	Mixed Air Rifle Standing Team 2-6	1049	12
Andrew Rambow	Mixed Air Rifle Standing Team 2-6	1049	12

=== Snooker ===
Australia was represented by John Hunt and Michael Quinn. Hunt finished 2nd in Pool A and Quinn finished 3rd in Pool C. Neither athlete qualified for the semifinals.

Event	Athlete	Pool play		Semifinal	Final
Event	Athlete	W-L	Rank	Semifinal	Final
Men's Snooker Event Open	John Hunt	1-1	2	Did not advance	
Men's Snooker Event Open	Michael Quinn	0-2	3	Did not advance	

=== Swimming ===
Selected team of 25 athletes.

Men	Women
Leslie Beath, Kingsley Bugarin, Brendan Burkett, Jason Diederich, Richard Dougan, Stephen Gregson, David Griffin, Greg Hammond, Simon Matthew Lee, David Lillecrapp, Brian Moores, Robert Philpot, Wayne Ryding, Ralph Smith, Gregory Timmermans, Phillip Tracey, Robert Walden	Karen Ferguson, Deborah Holland, Catherine Huggett, Susan Knox, Lyn Lillecrapp, Mandy Maywood, Sandra Yaxley, Judith Young

Australia won 5 gold, 12 silver and 14 bronze medals. Greg Hammond won two gold medals and Sandra Yaxley won one gold medal.

Judith Young won two gold medals and three silver medals. After winning gold in the 100m backstroke and 400m freestyle, The United States of America and Great Britain, protested that Young was swimming in the wrong category and should be reclassified from amputee to Les Autres. After winning both events in a world record time, the protest was upheld and Young was re-classified in the Les Autres category. Both world record times were scratched from the record books but Young was able to keep both the gold medals and a silver she won in the 100m breaststroke. She would go on to win two more medals in her new classification.

Men

Athlete	Event	Heats		Final	
Athlete	Event	Time	Rank	Time	Rank
Leslie Beath	Men's 100 m Backstroke A2	1:21.68	4	Did not advance	
Leslie Beath	Men's 100m Butterfly A2	1:22.94	4 Q	1:22.76	8
Leslie Beath	Men's 100 m Freestyle A2	1:07.92	3	Did not advance	
Leslie Beath	Men's 200 m Individual Medley A2	2:57.18	1	Did not advance	
Leslie Beath	Men's 400 m Freestyle A2	5:33.26	5	Did not advance	
Kingsley Bugarin	Men's 200 m Individual Medley B3	2:39.07	5 Q	2:36.29	6
Kingsley Bugarin	Men's 100 m Breaststroke B3	1:17.13	3 Q	1:17.67	3rd place, bronze medalist(s)
Kingsley Bugarin	Men's 200 m Breaststroke B3	2:49.87	3 Q	2:48.70	3rd place, bronze medalist(s)
Kingsley Bugarin	Men's 50 m Breaststroke B3	34.96	3 Q	34.82	3rd place, bronze medalist(s)
Brendan Burkett	Men's 100 m Breaststroke A2	1:33.99	2 Q	1:35.42	8
Brendan Burkett	Men's 100 m Butterfly A2	1:19.36	3 Q	1:21.18	7
Brendan Burkett	Men's 100 m Freestyle A2	1:06.31	3 Q	1:06.30	8
Brendan Burkett	Men's 400 m Freestyle A2	5:08.19	2 Q	5:03.18	6
Jason Diederich	Men's 100 m Backstroke A4	1:14.69	5 Q	1:14.17	6
Jason Diederich	Men's 100 m Butterfly A4	1:13.64	2 Q	1:10.47	4
Jason Diederich	Men's 100 m Freestyle A4	1:04.59	4 Q	1:03.81	8
Jason Diederich	Men's 200 m Individual Medley A4	2:44.49	6 Q	2:46.49	7
Jason Diederich	Men's 400 m Freestyle A4	5:15.56	6	Did not advance	
Richard Dougan	Men's 100 m Backstroke A4	1:20.23	5	Did not advance	
Richard Dougan	Men's 100 m Breaststroke A4	1:41.79	8	Did not advance	
Richard Dougan	Men's 100 m Butterfly A4	1:28.91	4	Did not advance	
Richard Dougan	Men's 100 m Freestyle A4	1:08.06	5	Did not advance	
Richard Dougan	Men's 200 m Individual Medley A4	2:53.62	5	Did not advance	
Richard Dougan	Men's 400 m Freestyle A4	5:24.81	6	Did not advance	
Stephen Gregson	Men's 100 m Freestyle C6	1:57.58	5	Did not advance	
Stephen Gregson	Men's 50 m Backstroke C6	N/A		1:09.15	7
David Griffin	Men's 100 m Backstroke A2	1:22.98	4	Did not advance	
David Griffin	Men's 200 m Individual Medley A2	2:48.64	3 Q	2:47.65	7
David Griffin	Men's 100 m Butterfly A2	1:17.22	2 Q	1:14.27	3rd place, bronze medalist(s)
David Griffin	Men's 100 m Freestyle A2	1:05.95	1 Q	1:04.60	3rd place, bronze medalist(s)
Greg Hammond	Men's 100 m Breaststroke A8	N/A		1:20.18 WR	1st place, gold medalist(s)
Greg Hammond	Men's 100 m Freestyle A8	1:06.26	2 Q	1:03.75 PR	1st place, gold medalist(s)
Simon Matthew Lee	Men's 100 m Breaststroke C8	N/A		1:46.47	5
Simon Matthew Lee	Men's 100 m Freestyle C8	1:26.19	3	Did not advance	
David Lillecrapp	Men's 100 m Backstroke A4	1:14.97	1 Q	1:13.74	4
David Lillecrapp	Men's 100 m Breaststroke A4	1:32.60	1 Q	1:33.73	7
David Lillecrapp	Men's 100 m Freestyle A4	1:05.46	4	Did not advance	
David Lillecrapp	Men's 200 m Individual Medley A4	2:46.18	3	Did not advance	
David Lillecrapp	Men's 400 m Freestyle A4	4:53.89	3 Q	4:51.90	6
Brian Moores	Men's 100 m Freestyle 1A	N/A		Did not start	N/A
Robert Philpot	Men's 100 m Freestyle C6	1:29.44	2 Q	1:35.98	6
Robert Philpot	Men's 50 m Breaststroke C6	N/A		57.79	5
Wayne Ryding	Men's 100 m Breaststroke 5	1:50.06	1 Q	1:45.39	4
Wayne Ryding	Men's 100 m Freestyle 5	1:10.52	1 Q	1:08.99	4
Wayne Ryding	Men's 400 m Freestyle 5	N/A		5:25.25	3rd place, bronze medalist(s)
Ralph Smith	Men's 100 m Freestyle A7	N/A		1:43.72	3rd place, bronze medalist(s)
Gregory Timmermans	Men's 50 m Backstroke C6	N/A		56.56	4
Gregory Timmermans	Men's 50 m Breaststroke C6	N/A		1:01.35	6
Phillip Tracey	Men's 100 m Freestyle 1A	N/A		3:02.71	2nd place, silver medalist(s)
Phillip Tracey	Men's 25 m Backstroke 1A	N/A		41.15	2nd place, silver medalist(s)
Phillip Tracey	Men's 50 m Freestyle 1A	N/A		1:28.07	2nd place, silver medalist(s)
Robert Walden	Men's 100 m Freestyle C6	1:31.57	1 Q	1:33.10	4
Robert Walden	Men's 50 m Backstroke C6	N/A		1:04.41	5
Robert Walden	Men's 50 m Breaststroke C6	N/A		57.34	4

Qualification Legend: Q= Qualified for final; PR= Paralympic Record; WR= World Record

Women

Athlete	Event	Heats		Final	
Athlete	Event	Time	Rank	Time	Rank
Karen Ferguson	Women's 100 m Freestyle C6	2:30.48	4 Q	2:26.19	7
Karen Ferguson	Women's 50 m Backstroke C6	N/A		1:06.15	7
Deborah Holland	Women's 100 m Breaststroke A2	2:01.89	3 Q	2:04.37	7
Deborah Holland	Women's 100 m Freestyle A2	1:23.97	5 Q	1:22.42	5
Deborah Holland	Women's 400 m Freestyle A2	N/A		5:50.58	3rd place, bronze medalist(s)
Catherine Huggett	Women's 400 m Freestyle C3-4	N/A		10:21.79	4
Catherine Huggett	Women's 100 m Backstroke C3	N/A		2:38.04	2nd place, silver medalist(s)
Lyn Lillecrapp	Women's 25 m Butterfly 2	N/A		34.27	3rd place, bronze medalist(s)
Lyn Lillecrapp	Women's 100 m Backstroke S6	N/A		58.37	3rd place, bronze medalist(s)
Lyn Lillecrapp	Women's 100 m Breaststroke SB3	N/A		54.21	3rd place, bronze medalist(s)
Lyn Lillecrapp	Women's 100 m Freestyle S6	N/A		1:17.07	2nd place, silver medalist(s)
Mandy Maywood	Women's 200 m Individual Medley B3	3:09.58	3 Q	3:10.82	6
Mandy Maywood	Women's 100 m Breaststroke B3	1:28.40	1 Q	1:30.73	3
Mandy Maywood	Women's 200 m Breaststroke B3	3:14.23	2 Q	3:14.53	3rd place, bronze medalist(s)
Mandy Maywood	Women's 50 m Breaststroke B3	40.85	1 Q	40.81	2nd place, silver medalist(s)
Sandra Yaxley	Women's 100 m Freestyle C6	1:42.00	1 Q	1:41.58	1st place, gold medalist(s)
Sandra Yaxley	Women's 50 m Backstroke C6	N/A		55.03	2nd place, silver medalist(s)
Judith Young	Women's 100 m Freestyle L6	N/A		1:09.88	4
Judith Young	Women's 100 m Backstroke A8	N/A		1:21.20	1st place, gold medalist(s)
Judith Young	Women's 400 m Freestyle A8	N/A		5:14.03	1st place, gold medalist(s)
Judith Young	Women's 100 m Breaststroke A8	N/A		1:35.17	2nd place, silver medalist(s)
Judith Young	Women's 100 m Butterfly L6	N/A		1:15.68	2nd place, silver medalist(s)
Judith Young	Women's 200 m Individual Medley L6	N/A		2:49.61	2nd place, silver medalist(s)

Qualification Legend: Q= Qualified for final; WR= World Record

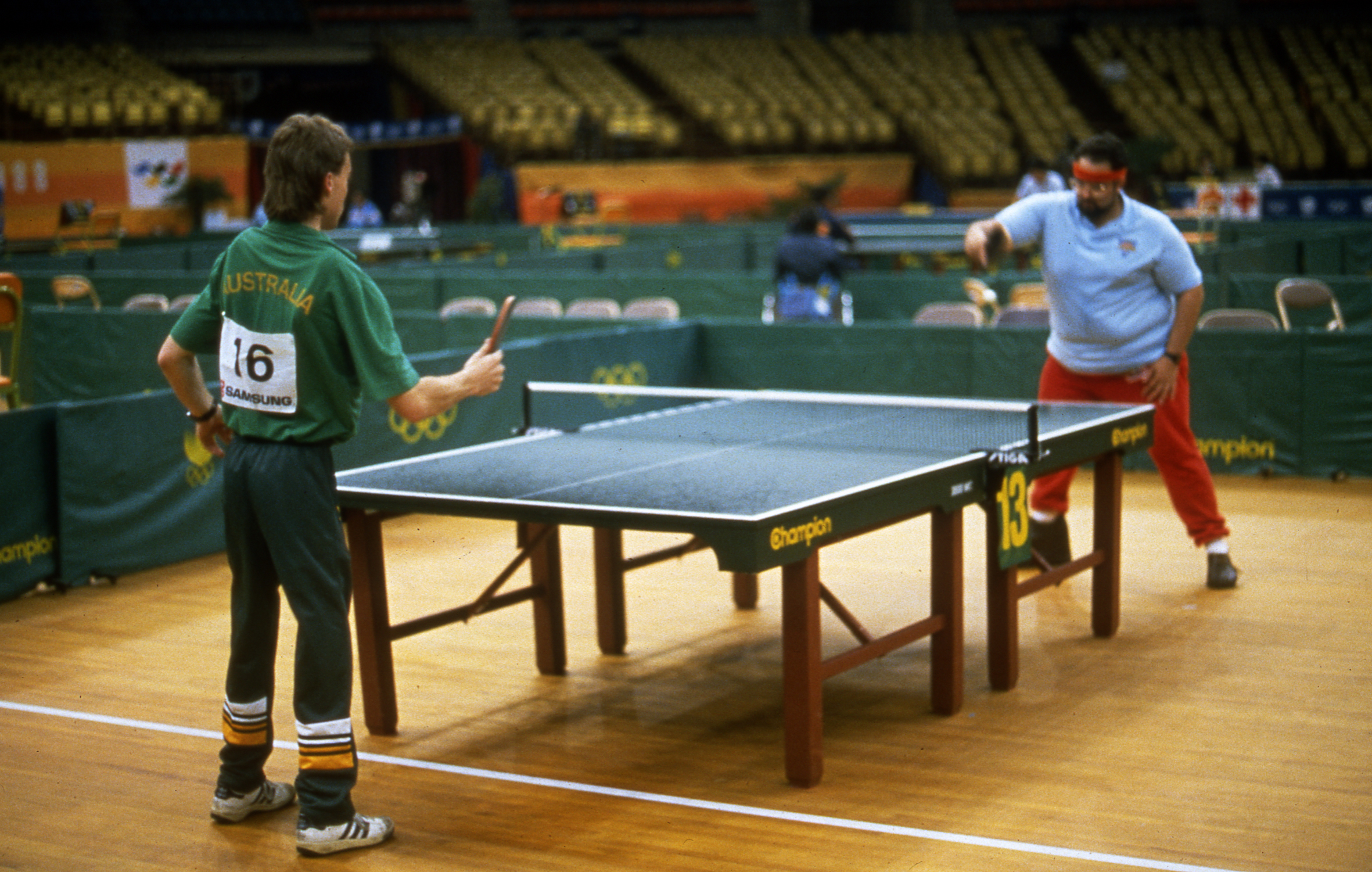
Australian tennis player practising with a player from another country

=== Table Tennis ===
Selected team of 9 athletes.

Men	Women
Geoffey Barden, Marcel Bucello, Paul Croft, Garry Croker, Jeremy O'Halloran, Craig Parsons, John Sheil, Ian Simpson	Carmel Williams

Australia did not win any medals.

Men

Athlete	Event	Pool play		Quarter-finals	Semi-finals	Final	Rank
		W-L	Rank	Opposition Result	Opposition Result	Opposition Result	Rank
Geoffey Barden	Men's Singles TT5	0-3	4	Did not advance			
Marcel Bucello	Men's Singles TT6	0-3	4	Did not advance			
Paul Croft	Men's Singles TT7	0-3	4	Did not advance			
Garry Croker	Men's Singles 1A	0-2	3	Did not advance			
Jeremy O'Halloran	Men's Singles TT5	0-4	5	Did not advance			
Craig Parsons	Men's Singles 1B	1-3	4	Did not advance			
John Sheil	Men's Singles 2	0-3	4	Did not advance			
Ian Simpson	Men's Singles 1C	1-1	2	Si Un Kim (KOR) L 0-2	Did not advance		

Women

Athlete	Event	Pool play		Quarter-finals	Semi-finals	Final / BM	Rank
Athlete	Event	W-L	Rank	Opposition Result	Opposition Result	Opposition Result	Rank
Carmel Williams	Women's Singles 2	1-1	2	Lone Rasmussen (DEN) W 2-1	Elisabeth Bisquolm (SUI) L 0-2	Jolanda Paardekam (NED) L 0-2	4

=== Weightlifting ===
Selected team of 5 athletes.

Men
Ray Epstein, Brian McNicholl, Arnie Money, Paul O’Brien, Col Richards

Australia won a bronze medal through Brian McNicholl's performance.

Athlete	Event	Result	Rank
Ray Epstein	Men's Up to 51 kg	135 kg	7
Brian McNicholl	Men's Up to 85 kg	192.5 kg	3rd place, bronze medalist(s)
Arnie Money	Men's Up to 57 kg	125	11
Paul O'Brien	Men's Up to 85 kg	155	7
Col Richards	Men's Up to 65 kg	135	8

=== Wheelchair Basketball ===
The Australian Men's Wheelchair Basketball team was placed in Group B with Argentina, France, Germany and Morocco. Australia lost to France 49-61, lost to Germany 27-43, defeated Argentina 54-36 and defeated Morocco 88-21. Australia finished third in their group and 10th overall, losing to Belgium in the 9th place playoff game.

Australian Team
Troy Andrews, Sandy Blythe, Stuart Ewin, David Gould, Michael Haughey, Gerry Hewson, Erich Hubel, Michael McFawn, Richard Oliver, Christopher Sparks, Stephen Trestrail, Michael Walker

Group Stage

Team	Pld	W	L	PF	PA	PD	Pts
France	4	4	0	257	146	+111	8
Germany	4	3	1	201	141	+60	7
Australia	4	2	2	218	161	+57	6
Argentina	4	1	3	170	189	-19	5
Morocco	4	0	4	89	298	-209	4

Classification 9-16

Team	Quarterfinal	Semifinal	Final	Rank
Team	Opposition Score	Opposition Score	Opposition Score	Rank
Australia	Mexico W 68 – 52	Great Britain W 40 – 29	Belgium L 43 – 47	10

=== Wheelchair Fencing ===
Australia was represented by two athletes, Robert Goodwin and Robert Jordan. Neither athlete advanced out of the pool rounds.

Event	Athlete	Pool play		Final Round	Rank
Event	Athlete	W-L	Rank	Final Round	Rank
Men's Foil Individual 1C-3	Robert Goodwin	2-2	3	Did not advance	
Men's Foil Individual 1C-3	Robert Jordan	0-3	4	Did not advance	
Men's Sabre Individual 1C-3	Robert Goodwin	0-3	4	Did not advance	

=== Wheelchair Tennis ===
Wheelchair tennis was a demonstration sport and the medals awarded were not included in the overall medal tally. Mick Connell was the sole representative for Australia and was runner up in the men's singles.

Athlete	Event	Semifinal	Final	Rank
Athlete	Event	Opposition Score	Opposition Score	Rank
Mick Connell	Men's Singles	Chip Turner (USA) W 6-7, 7-6, 6-0	Laurent Giammartini (GER) L 2-6, 2-6	2nd place, silver medalist(s)

== See also ==
- Australia at the Paralympics
- 1988 Summer Paralympics
