= Athletics at the 2000 Summer Paralympics – Men's marathon T11 =

Men's marathon T11 at the XI Paralympic Games
- Paralympic Athletics
- Venue: Sydney Olympic Stadium
- Dates: 29 October 2000
- Competitors: 13 from 9 nations

Medalists
1st place, gold medalist(s)		Carlos Amaral Ferreira	Portugal
2nd place, silver medalist(s)		Robert Matthews	Great Britain
3rd place, bronze medalist(s)		Carlo Durante	Italy

The Men's marathon T11 was a marathon event in athletics at the 2000 Summer Paralympics in Sydney, for totally blind athletes. Defending champion Harumi Yanagawa of Japan took part, as did 1992 gold medallist Carlo Durante of Italy, and 1988 gold medallist Joerund Gaasemyr or Norway, holder of the Paralympic record in 2:45:48. There were thirteen starters, from nine countries; twelve of them reached the finish line. Portugal's Carlos Amaral Ferreira took gold, setting a new world record in 2:38:27, and finishing over nine minutes ahead of silver medallist Robert Matthews.

== Results ==
Place	Athlete	Time
1	Carlos Amaral Ferreira (POR)	2:38:27 (WR)
2	Robert Matthews (GBR)	2:47:38
3	Carlo Durante (ITA)	2:48:45
4	Joerund Gaasemyr (NOR)	2:50:31
5	Klaus Meyer (GER)	2:53:54
6	Harumi Yanagawa (JPN)	2:54:08
7	Nicolas Ledezma (MEX)	2:55:15
8	Gerrard Gosens (AUS)	3:03:18
9	Clemente Esquivel (MEX)	3:04:04
10	Jeff McNeill (AUS)	3:04:44
11	Pedro Acosta (MEX)	3:27:24
12	Jan Gosselin (BEL)	3:51:38
-	Tofiri Kibuuka (NOR)	dnf

== See also ==
- Marathon at the Paralympics
