= Athletics at the 1992 Summer Paralympics – Men's marathon B1 =

Men's marathon B1 at the IX Paralympic Games
- Paralympic Athletics
- Dates: 13 September
- Competitors: 7 from 6 nations

Medalists
1st place, gold medalist(s)		Carlo Durante	Italy
2nd place, silver medalist(s)		Tofiri Kibuuka	Norway
3rd place, bronze medalist(s)		Steve Brooks	Canada

The Men's marathon B1 was a marathon event in athletics at the 1992 Summer Paralympics, for totally blind athletes. It was contested by seven athletes from six countries. Among them was defending champion Joerund Gaasemyr, of Norway, who had won the race in 1988 with a world record time of 2:45:48. Also competing was his compatriot Tofiri Kibuuka, who had previously represented his native Uganda at the Winter Paralympics, and had been the first African athlete at the Winter Games.

== Results ==
Place	Athlete	Time
1	Carlo Durante (ITA)	2:50:40
2	Tofiri Kibuuka (NOR)	2:51:34
3	Steve Brooks (CAN)	2:59:16
4	Faustino Blanco (ESP)	3:01:41
5	Joerund Gaasemyr (NOR)	3:04:18
6	Harumi Yanagawa (JPN)	3:09:29
7	Pablo Astoreca (ARG)	3:12:10

== See also ==
- Marathon at the Paralympics
