= Jason Smart =

Jason Smart may refer to:

- Jason Smart (footballer) (born 1969), English footballer
- Jason Smart (Paralympian), Australian Paralympic athlete
