= Judith Young =

Judith Young may refer to:

- Judith Young (swimmer)
- Judith Young (astronomer)
- Judy Lewis, born Judith Young, American actress
