= David Jakubovich =

Israeli Paralympic athlete (born 1948)

Personal information
- Native name: דוד יעקובוביץ'
Medal record
Event / 1st / 2nd / 3rd; Paralympic Games / 0 / 1 / 1
Representing Israel
Paralympic Games
Men's para athletics
Bronze medal – third place	1980 Arnhem	Pentathlon A
Silver medal – second place	1988 Seoul	Marathon B1

David Jakubovich (Hebrew: דוד יעקובוביץ'; born 1948) is a former Paralympic athlete representing Israel.

Jakubovich was born in Teplice and emigrated to Israel in 1964. He enlisted to the Israeli Combat Engineering Corps and was injured in 1968 from a mine, causing him severe burn and the loss of his eyesight.

Jakubovich participated in three Summer Paralympics from 1980 to 1988 and took part in nine events, all in athletics.

At the 1980 Summer Paralympics Jakubovich won a bronze medal in pentathlon. He also competed in three other events, ranking 12th in the Men's 1500 metre event and 19th in the Men's 60 metre event. He was not ranked at the Men's 400 metre event.

At the 1984 Summer Paralympics Jakubovich competed in the men's events for 100, 400, 800 and 1500 metres.

At the 1988 Summer Paralympics Jakubovich won a silver medal in the Marathon B1 event.

Jakubovich's was the subject of a short documentary "Long distance running in the dark".

== See also ==
- Israel at the 1980 Summer Paralympics
- Israel at the 1984 Summer Paralympics
- Israel at the 1988 Summer Paralympics
