= Athletics at the 1996 Summer Paralympics – Men's marathon T10 =

Men's marathon T10 at the X Paralympic Games
- Paralympic Athletics
- Dates: 25 August
- Competitors: 14 from 11 nations

Medalists
| 1st place, gold medalist(s) | | Harumi Yanagawa | Japan |
| 2nd place, silver medalist(s) | | Carlo Durante | Italy |
| 3rd place, bronze medalist(s) | | Nicolas Ledezma | Mexico |

The Men's marathon T10 was a marathon event in athletics at the 1996 Summer Paralympics, for totally blind athletes. Defending champion Carlo Durante of Italy took part, as did 1992 silver medallist Tofiri Kibuuka of Norway, and 1988 gold medallist Joerund Gaasemyr or Norway, holder of the Paralympic record in 2:45:48. Durante failed to defend his title, and took silver, finishing two and a half minutes behind Japan's Harumi Yanagawa, who had finished sixth four years earlier. The two Norwegians failed to obtain a place on the podium. Of the fourteen starters, eleven reached the finish line.

== Results ==
| Place | Athlete | Time |
|---|---|---|
| 1 | Harumi Yanagawa (JPN) | 2:50:56 |
| 2 | Carlo Durante (ITA) | 2:53:32 |
| 3 | Nicolas Ledezma (MEX) | 2:56:13 |
| 4 | Klaus Meyer (GER) | 2:57:45 |
| 5 | Joerund Gaasemyr (NOR) | 2:58:24 |
| 6 | Tofiri Kibuuka (NOR) | 3:05:06 |
| 7 | Donald Mott (USA) | 3:28:34 |
| 8 | Jan Gosselin (BEL) | 3:34:12 |
| 9 | David Collins (USA) | 3:43:45 |
| 10 | Santigo Morrone (ARG) | 3:44:07 |
| 11 | William Covington (USA) | 3:50:02 |
| - | Kang Dae (KOR) | dnf |
| - | Martin Mozo (COL) | dnf |
| - | Konstantinos Stavridis (GRE) | dnf |

== See also ==
- Marathon at the Paralympics
