= Tofiri Kibuuka =

Norwegian athlete

Medal record

Men's para-athletics

Representing Norway

Paralympic Games
| Silver medal – second place | 1984 Stoke Mandeville / New York | 800m |
| Silver medal – second place | 1984 Stoke Mandeville / New York | 1,500m |
| Silver medal – second place | 1984 Stoke Mandeville / New York | 5,000m |
| Silver medal – second place | 1988 Seoul | 5,000m |
| Silver medal – second place | 1992 Barcelona | Marathon |
| Bronze medal – third place | 1988 Seoul | 1,500m |

Tofiri Kibuuka (born 1947 in Mukono District, Uganda) is a Ugandan-born Norwegian athlete. He has participated in both the Winter Paralympic Games, in cross-country skiing (for Uganda) and in the Summer Paralympic Games, in mid- and long-distance running (for Norway). Active from 1976 to 2000, he won five Paralympic silver medals, and one bronze.

== Biography ==
He holds the distinction of being the first African to have competed at the Winter Paralympics, and more generally the only athlete from a tropical nation to have done so before 2014. He is also one of only two Africans to have competed at the Winter Games, the other being Bruce Warner of South Africa.

Kibuuka lost his vision at age 13 due to a degenerative disease. He has two sons.

== Prior to the Paralympics ==
Kibuuka studied at the Outward Bound School in Kenya.

In 1968, he was one of the first blind people to ascend successfully to the peak of Mount Kilimanjaro, earning media attention as well as praise from the Ugandan Minister of Labour. Due to this event, he was invited to Norway by an "organisation promoting sports for the disabled". He arrived in Norway in 1972, a year after Idi Amin's rise to power in Uganda. Due to the situation in his country of origin, he was to remain in Norway permanently, but nonetheless competed for Uganda in the 1970s.

== Winter Paralympics ==
Kibuuka made his Paralympic Games début representing Uganda at the inaugural Winter Paralympics in 1976 in Örnsköldsvik, Sweden. He was his country's sole representative, and, as Uganda was the only African country to compete, he was the first African to take part in the Winter Paralympics – eight years before Lamine Guèye of Senegal became the first African to compete at the Winter Olympics.

At the 1976 Games, he competed in two events.

- In the Men's short distance 10 km (category A), he finished 16th (out of 28), with a time of 58:24.
- In the Men's middle distance 15 km (category A), he finished 10th (out of 25), with a time of 1:16:32.

He competed again in 1980, where he was once more the only African competitor. He entered two events:

- In the Men's middle distance 10 km (category 5B), he finished 12th (out of 31), with a time of 49:52.
- In the Men's long distance 20 km (category 5B), he finished 11th (out of 30), with a time of 1:42:17.

He did not compete again in the Winter Paralympics. Having obtained Norwegian citizenship, he began to compete for Norway at the Summer Paralympics.

== Summer Paralympics ==
Despite having first moved to Norway due to his potential as a Winter Paralympian, and despite his solid performance for Uganda at the Winter Paralympics, it was as a runner that Kibuuka obtained all his Paralympic medals.

At the 1984 Summer Paralympics in Stoke Mandeville and New York, representing Norway, he entered three events:

- In the Men's 800 metres (category B1), he won his heat with a time of 2:07.83, and his semi-final in 2:12.13. Improving his time to 2:04.26, he finished second in the final, taking the silver medal behind Robert Matthews of Great Britain, who established a new world record in 2:02.33.
- In the Men's 1500 metres (category B1), he finished first in his heat (4:28.42), and second in the final (4:20.16), taking a silver medal – again, behind a new world record by Matthews of Great Britain.
- In the Men's 5000 metres (category B1), he took silver with a time of 16:42.18, behind Matthews' world record 16:36.90, and ahead of his Norwegian compatriot Joerund Gaasemyr, who took bronze in 17:55.73.

In the 1988 Games, he entered only the 1,500 and 5,000m events, winning bronze in the former (in 4:15.94, behind Matthews for gold and fellow Norwegian Terje Loevaas for silver), and silver in the latter (in 16:22.14, once more behind Matthews).

In 1992, he was Norway's flagbearer during the Games' opening ceremony. He entered the same events as in 1988, but finished fifth in the 1,500m (4:25.48) and fourth in the 5,000m (16:24.02). While Matthews remained Paralympic champion, and Loevaas remained on the podium with bronze, Portugal's Paulo de Almeida Coelho finished second to edge Kibuuka off the podium. However, Kibuuka did also enter the marathon for the first time, finishing in 2:51:34 to take silver, behind Italy's Carlo Durante.

From then on, he would compete only in long-distance running. In 1996, he entered the 10,000m (T10 category) as well as the marathon (T10). He finished fourth in the former, in 36:10.58, and sixth in the latter, in 3:05:06. For his final appearance at the Paralympics, in 2000, he entered only the marathon (T11), but injured himself during the race and failed to finish.

== See also ==
- Lamine Guèye, first Black African to compete at the Winter Olympic Games, in 1984. (South Africa, under apartheid, had been represented by an all-white team in 1960.)
- John Akii-Bua, Ugandan Olympic athlete during the time of Idi Amin
- Prossy Tusabe, Ugandan swimmer who was also a victim to the Idi Amin regime
