= Athletics at the 1988 Summer Paralympics – Men's marathon B1 =

Men's marathon B1 at the VIII Paralympic Games
- Paralympic Athletics
- Competitors: 6 from 6 nations

Medalists
1st place, gold medalist(s)		Joerund Gaasemyr	Norway
2nd place, silver medalist(s)		David Jakubovich	Israel
3rd place, bronze medalist(s)		Carlos Roberto Sestrem	Brazil

The Men's marathon B1 was a marathon event in athletics at the 1988 Summer Paralympics, for totally blind athletes. It was the first time marathon events for blind or visually impaired athletes were held at the Paralympic Games; the marathon had been introduced to the Paralympics in 1984, but had then been held only for wheelchair athletes. The men's 1988 B1 marathon was contested by six athletes from six countries. Norway's Joerund Gaasemyr won by a clear margin, in 2:45:48, quarter of an hour ahead of his competitors, who all completed the race in three hours or more.

== Results ==
Place	Athlete	Time
1	Joerund Gaasemyr (NOR)	2:45:48
2	David Jakubovich (ISR)	3:00:47
3	Carlos Roberto Sestrem (BRA)	3:01:59
4	Atsushi Uesugi (JPN)	3:02:14
5	Richard Holborow (USA)	3:03:48
6	Peter Cliff (AUS)	3:06:28

== See also ==
- Marathon at the Paralympics
