= Paul Croft =

Australian arm amputee athlete

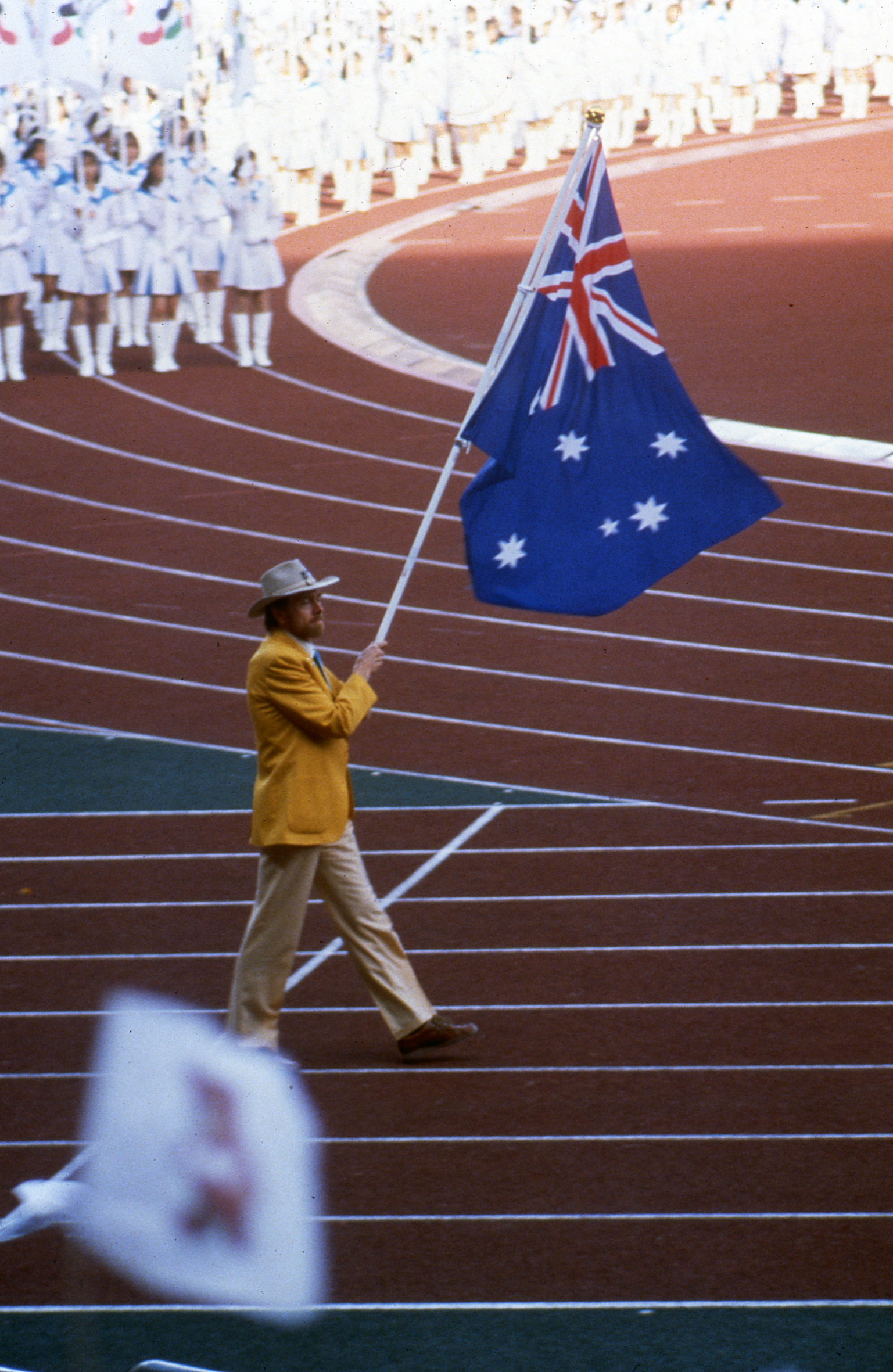
- Paul Croft Australian Flagbearer at the 1988 Paralympics

Personal information
- Full name: Paul Croft
- Nationality: Australian
- Born: 11 March 1951 (age 75) Sydney

Paul Croft (born 11 March 1951) is an Australian arm amputee athlete who has participated in four Summer Paralympic Games. He was the Australian team captain and flag bearer at the 1988 Seoul Paralympics.

== Personal ==
Croft was born on 11 March 1951 in Sydney. He was a TAFE business studies teacher in Sydney. In 1992, he was Liverpool Citizen of the Year.

== Paralympics career ==
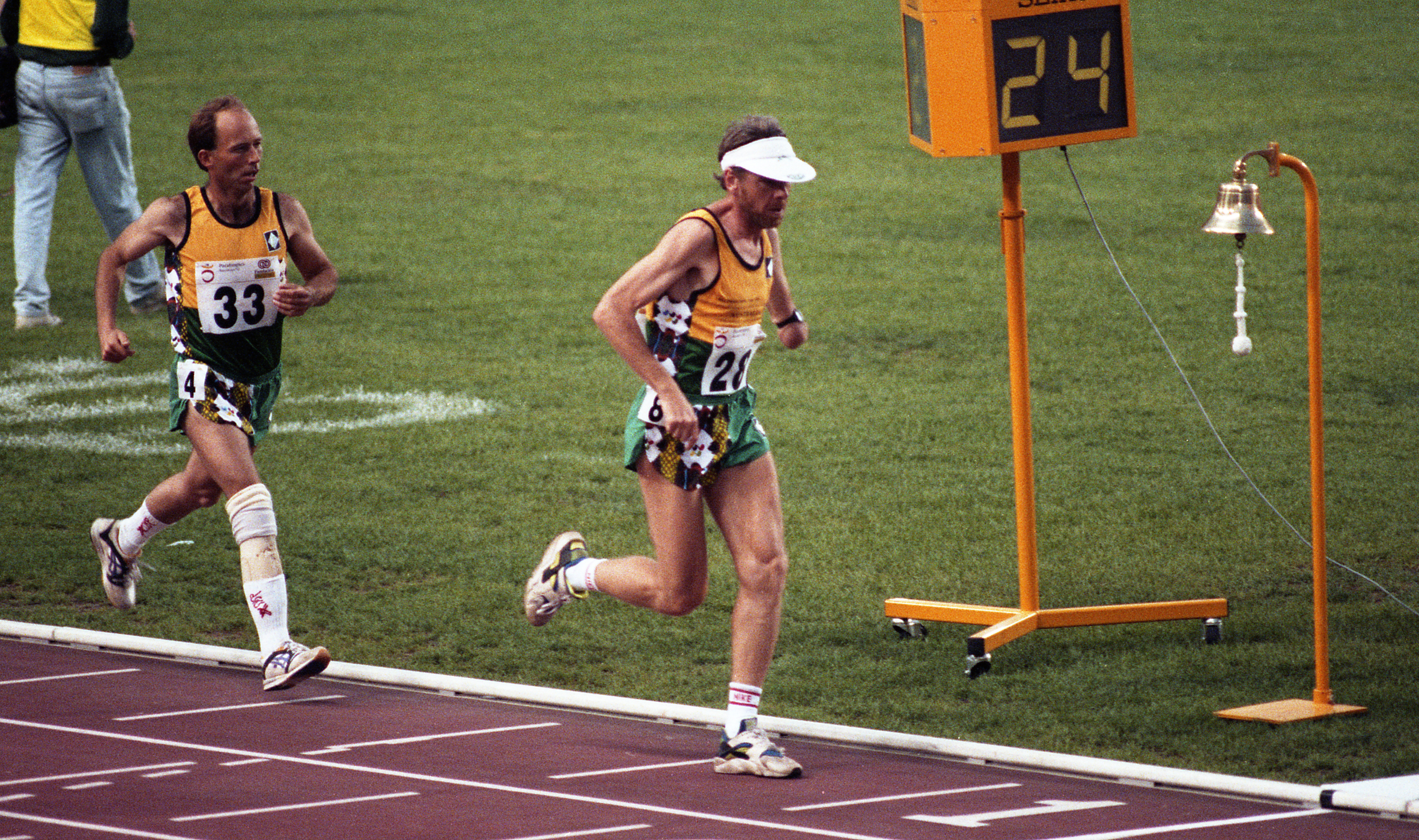
Paul Croft (front) and Kyrra Grunnsund running in the 10000m at 1992 Paralympics

His first Summer Paralympics was at the 1984 New York Paralympics, where he finished seventh in the Men's 1500m A6 and fourth in the Men's 5000m A6. At the 1988 Seoul Paralympics, he was appointed the Australian team captain. He participated in two sports. In athletics, he finished sixth in the Men's 10000m despite an Achilles tendon injury. In table tennis he competed in the Men's Singles TT7 but did not progress past the preliminary round. At the 1992 Summer Paralympics, he finished seventh in the Men's 10000 m TS4. Croft qualified for the marathon at the 1996 Atlanta Paralympics but was not selected due to the size of the team. At the 2000 Sydney Paralympics, at the age of 49, he was a member of the Australian sitting volleyball team. He ran a leg of the Sydney Paralympic Games Torch Relay.

In his post Paralympics career, Croft has been coaching at the Bankstown Sports Athletics Club and a regular swimmer. He has had three knee reconstructions and a serious push bike accident.
