= Rodney Nugent =

Australian Paralympic athlete

Personal information
- Full name: Rodney Francis Nugent
- Nationality: Australia
- Born: 26 November 1967 (age 58) Lismore, New South Wales
Medal record
Athletics
Paralympic Games
Gold medal – first place	1988 Seoul	Men’s Long Jump
Gold medal – first place	1988 Seoul	Men’s Triple Jump
Gold medal – first place	1988 Seoul	Men's 4 × 100 m Relay A2A4-7
Gold medal – first place	1988 Seoul	Men's 4 × 400 m Relay A2A4-7
Gold medal – first place	1992 Barcelona	Men's 4 × 100 m Relay TS2,4
Bronze medal – third place	1988 Seoul	Men’s 100 m (A6 A8 A9 L4)
Bronze medal – third place	1988 Seoul	Men’s 200 m (A6 A8 A9 L4)
Bronze medal – third place	1988 Seoul	Men’s High Jump (A6 A8 A9 L6)
World Championships and Games for the Disabled
Gold medal – first place	1990 Assen	Men's Triple Jump 9F
Gold medal – first place	1990 Assen	Men's 4 × 100 m Relay 3T
Silver medal – second place	1990 Assen	Men's 100 m 6T
Silver medal – second place	1990 Assen	Men's High Jump 9F
Bronze medal – third place	1990 Assen	Men's High Jump 9F

Rodney Francis Nugent, OAM (born 26 November 1967) is an Australian Paralympic athlete.

== Personal ==
Nugent was born on 26 November 1967 in the northern New South Wales city of Lismore. At the age of 15, he lost the lower portion of his right arm in an industrial accident with a mincing machine. Before the accident, Nugent enjoyed sport and played soccer and cricket. The accident did not stop his love of sport and he turned his focus to athletics and coaching.

He is married and has three sons.

== Career ==
At the 1988 Seoul Paralympics, Nugent entered seven events and won four gold (long jump, triple jump, 4 × 100 m Relay, and 4 × 400 m Relay) and three bronze medals (100 m, 200 m and high jump). He broke three world records.

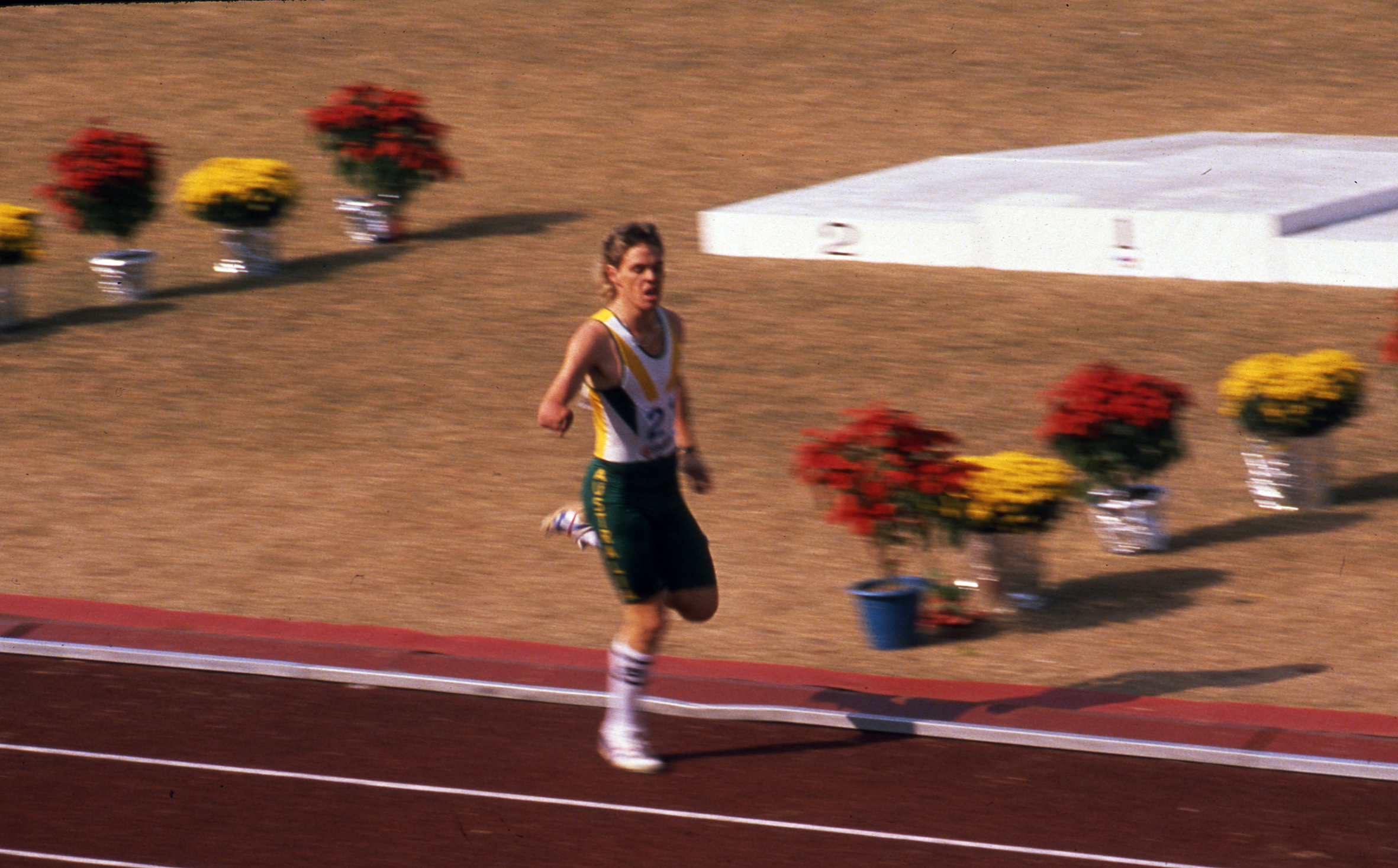
Rodney Nugent winner of 5 medals in Athletics at the 1988 Seoul Paralympic Games.

At the World Championships and Games for the Disabled in Assen, Netherlands he won gold medals in the men's triple jump 9F and men's 4 × 100 m relay 3T, silver medals in the men's 100 m 6T and men's high jump 9F and bronze medal in men's long jump 9F.

In 1992, he accepted a scholarship in the newly established Australian Institute of Sport (AIS) Athletes with a Disabilities program and was coached by Chris Nunn. In joining the AIS program, Nugent commented "It’s very hard for athletes to finance their own training – I did it for years and it was tough. Getting this scholarship with the AIS has made all the difference. The facilities are good and the training program is excellent".

Nugent won a gold medal at the 1992 Barcelona Games in the Men's 4 × 100 m Relay TS2,4 event, a world record. He also competed in the 100 m, 200 m, long jump and triple jump. He left the AIS program after the 1992 Barcelona Paralympics.

In two Paralympics, Nugent won five gold and three bronze medals.

In an interview in 2011, Nugent commented that sport allowed him to achieve the goals he had as an able bodied athlete and played a significant role in his rehabilitation.

Nugent is currently with Mid North Coast Special Olympics as public relations officer and coaching Special Olympic athletes Bennett Powell and Josh Southgate in Port Macquarie. He is the Australian special olympics head athletics coach and has also filled this role at the state level for New South Wales.

== Awards ==
- Daily Examiner Sports Star of the Year Award - 1986, 1987 & 1988
- Medal of the Order of Australia (1993) for his 1992 gold medal
- Clarence Valley Council Sporting Wall of Fame induction in 2002.
