= Patricia Molseed =

Australian Paralympic athlete

Personal information
- Nationality: Australia
Medal record
Athletics
Paralympic Games
Gold medal – first place	1988 Seoul	Women's Shot Put B1

Patricia Molseed is a vision impaired Australian Paralympic athlete. She won a gold medal at the 1988 Seoul Games in the Women's Shot Put B1 event. Her first throw of 8.82 m was a Paralympic record but also resulted in a torn back muscle with prevented her further good throws. She was 43 during the Games and a school teacher in Perth, Western Australia.

In 2013, she was a music teacher at Bluff Point Primary School, Geraldton, Western Australia and had a guide dog.
