= Andrew O'Sullivan =

Australian Paralympic athlete

Personal information
- Nationality: Australia
Medal record
Athletics
Paralympic Games
Gold medal – first place	1988 Seoul	Men's 4x400 m Relay A2A4–7
Bronze medal – third place	1988 Seoul	Men's 400 m A4A9

Andrew O'Sullivan is an Australian Paralympic athlete. At the 1988 Seoul Games, he won a gold medal in the Men's 4x400 m Relay A2A4–7 event and a bronze medal in the Men's 400 m A4A9 event.
