= Matthew Pobje =

Australian Paralympic powerlifter

Matthew Pobjie
Personal information
- Nationality: Australia
Medal record
Powerlifting
Paralympic Games
Silver medal – second place	1988 Seoul	Men's Up To 100 kg

Matthew Pobjie is a Paralympic powerlifting competitor from Australia. He won a silver medal at the 1988 Seoul Games in the Men's Up To 100 kg event.
