= Nigel Parsons =

Australian Paralympic athlete

Personal information
- Nationality: Australia
Medal record
Athletics
Paralympic Games
Gold medal – first place	1988 Seoul	Men's 4x100 m Relay A2A4–7
Gold medal – first place	1988 Seoul	Men's 4x400 m Relay A2A4–7

Nigel Parsons is an Australian Paralympic athlete. He won two gold medals at the 1988 Seoul Games in the Men's 4x100 m Relay A2A4–7 and Men's 4x400 m Relay A2A4–7 events.
