= Deborah Holland (swimmer) =

Australian Paralympic swimmer

Personal information
- Nationality: Australia
Medal record
Swimming
Paralympic Games
Bronze medal – third place	1988 Seoul	Women's 400 m Freestyle A2

Deborah Holland is a Paralympic swimming competitor from Australia. She won a bronze medal at the 1988 Seoul Games in the Women's 400 m Freestyle A2 event.
