= Jaime Romaguera =

Australian Paralympic athlete & footballer (born 1966)

Personal information
- Full name: Jaime Peter Romaguera
- Nationality: Australian
- Born: 4 July 1966 (age 59) Brisbane, Australia

Sport
- Country: Australia
- Sport: Para athletics
Medal record
Paralympic Games
Silver medal – second place	1996 Atlanta	Men's 100 m T34
Bronze medal – third place	1992 Barcelona	Men's 100 m C5

Jaime Peter Romaguera (born 4 July 1966) is a former Australian Paralympic athlete and footballer. He was born in Brisbane and has cerebral palsy. He competed at the 1988 Seoul Paralympics in football 7-a-side and athletics. At the 1992 Atlanta Paralympics, he won a bronze medal in the Men's 100 m C5 athletics event. He won a silver medal in the Men's 100 m T34 athletics event at the 1996 Atlanta Paralympics.
