= Yvette McLellan =

Australian Paralympic athlete

Personal information
- Nationality: Australia
Medal record
Athletics
Paralympic Games
| Silver medal – second place | 1988 Seoul | Women's 400 m 2 |
| Silver medal – second place | 1988 Seoul | Women's 4x400 m Relay 2-6 |

Yvette McLellan is a Paralympic athletics competitor from Australia. She won a pair of silver medals at the 1988 Seoul Games in the Women's 400 m 2 event and the Women's 4 × 400 m Relay 2-6 event.
