= Carlo Durante =

Italian paralympic athlete (1946–2020)

Medal record

Track and field (athletics)

Representing Italy

Paralympic Games
Gold medal – first place	1992 Barcelona	Marathon - B1
Silver medal – second place	1996 Atlanta	Marathon - T10
Bronze medal – third place	2000 Sydney	Marathon - T11

Carlo Durante (June 27, 1946 – May 24, 2020) was an Italian paralympic athlete, who mainly competed in category T11 marathon events.

Carlo ran in the marathon at the 1992 Summer Olympics, winning the gold medal in the B1 event. He also participated in the 1996 Summer Paralympics and the 2000 Summer Paralympics, taking a silver medal in the T10 marathon in 1996 and winning the bronze medal in the T11 event in 2000. His final appearance was in the 2004 Summer Paralympics, though he did not medal.
