= Brad Hill (athlete) =

Australian Paralympic athlete

Bradley Hill
Personal information
- Nationality: Australia
Medal record
Athletics
Paralympic Games
Gold medal – first place	1988 Seoul	Men's 200 m C7
Silver medal – second place	1988 Seoul	Men's 400 m C7

Brad Hill is an Australian Paralympic athlete. At the 1988 Seoul Games, he won a gold medal in the Men's 200 m C7 event and a silver medal in the Men's 400 m C7 event.
