= Vincenzo Vallelonga =

Australian Paralympic athlete

Personal information
- Nationality: Australia
Medal record
Athletics
Paralympic Games
Silver medal – second place	1988 Seoul	Men's 4x100 m Relay 1A–1C
Silver medal – second place	1988 Seoul	Men's 100 m 1B
Silver medal – second place	1992 Barcelona	Men's 4x100 m Relay TW1–2
Bronze medal – third place	1988 Seoul	Men's 4x200 m Relay 1A–1C
Bronze medal – third place	1988 Seoul	Men's Slalom 1B
Bronze medal – third place	1992 Barcelona	Men's 4x400 m Relay TW1–2

Vincenzo Vallelonga is a Paralympic athletics competitor from Australia. At the 1988 Summer Paralympics he won four medals: silver in the Men's 4 × 100 m Relay 1A–1C, silver in the Men's 100 m 1B, bronze in the Men's 4 × 200 m Relay 1A–1C and bronze in the Men's Slalom 1B. At the 1992 Barcelona Games he won a bronze medal in the Men's 4 × 400 m Relay TW1-2 event and a silver medal in the Men's 4 × 100 m Relay TW1-2 event.
