= Ralph Smith (swimmer) =

Australian Paralympic swimmer

Personal information
- Nationality: Australia
Medal record
Swimming
Paralympic Games
Bronze medal – third place	1988 Seoul	Men's 100 m Freestyle A7

Ralph Smith is a Paralympic swimming competitor from Australia. He won a bronze medal at the 1988 Seoul Games in the Men's 100 m Freestyle A7 event.
