= Bruce Wallrodt =

Australian Paralympic athlete (1951–2019)

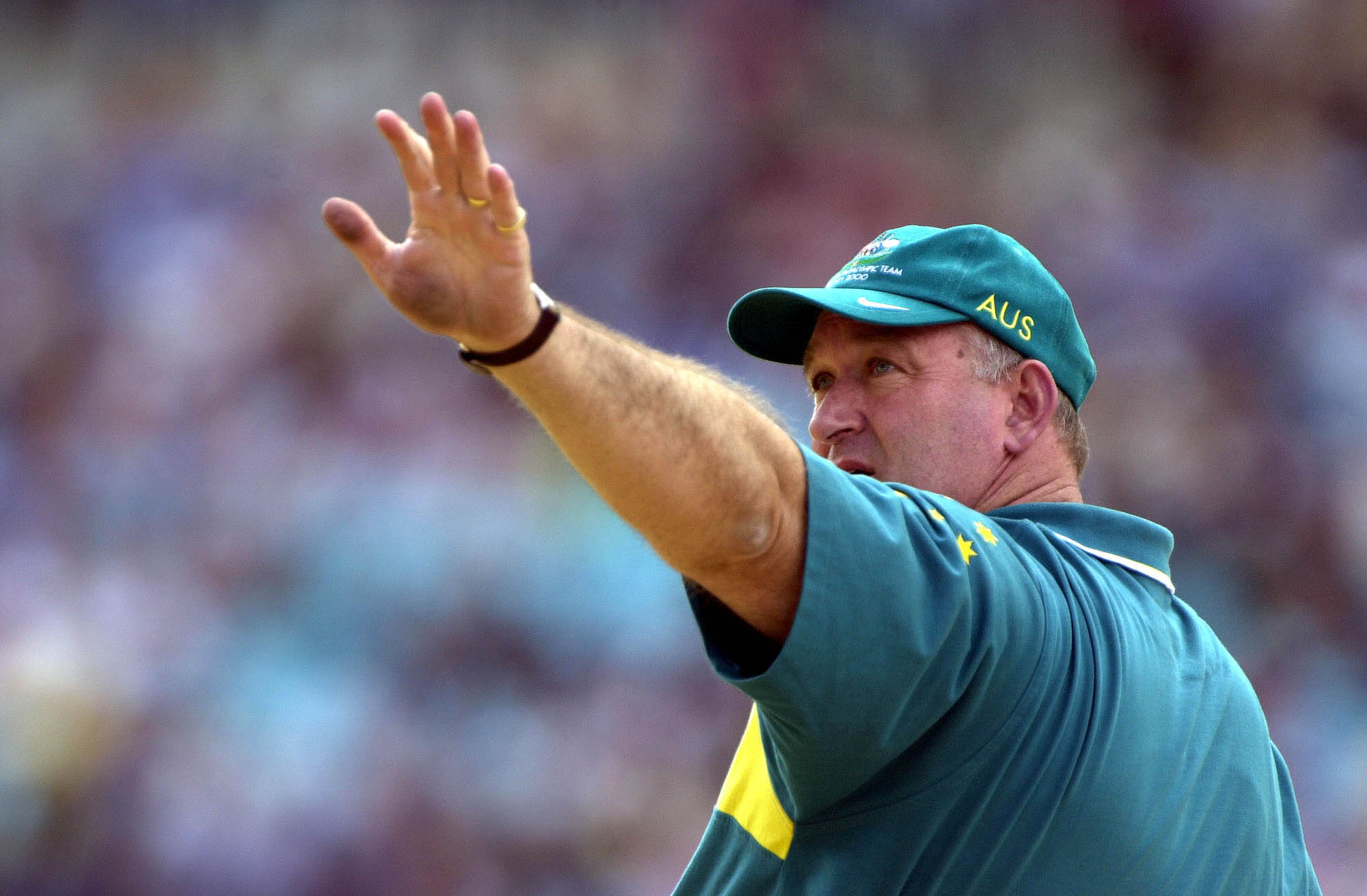
- Wallrodt seen waving to the crowds during javelin competition at the 2000 Summer Paralympics

Personal information
- Full name: Bruce Wallrodt
- Nationality: Australia
- Born: 26 September 1951 Bunbury, Western Australia
- Died: 2 July 2019 (aged 67) Perth, Western Australia
Medal record
Athletics
Paralympic Games
Gold medal – first place	1988 Seoul	Men's Shot Put 2
Gold medal – first place	1988 Seoul	Men's Javelin 2
Gold medal – first place	1992 Barcelona	Men's Javelin THW4
Gold medal – first place	1996 Atlanta	Men's Shot Put F53
Silver medal – second place	1992 Barcelona	Men's Discus THW4
Silver medal – second place	1992 Barcelona	Men's Shot Put THW4
Silver medal – second place	2000 Sydney	men's shot put T54
Bronze medal – third place	1988 Seoul	Men's Discus 2
Bronze medal – third place	1996 Atlanta	Men's Javelin F53
World Championships and Games for the Disabled
Gold medal – first place	1990 Assen	Men's Shot Put F4
Gold medal – first place	1990 Assen	Men's F4 Discus
IPC Athletics World Championships
Gold medal – first place	2002 Lille	Men's Shot Put F54

Bruce Wallrodt, OAM (26 September 1951 – 2 July 2019) was an Australian Paralympic athlete. He competed at five Paralympic Games and won nine medals, four of them gold.

== Personal ==
Wallrodt was born on 26 September 1951 in the Western Australian city of Bunbury. He attended South Bunbury Primary School and Newton Moore Senior High School. After leaving school, he worked as a fitter and turner until the age of 29, when he had a spinal haemorrhage that left him paraplegic.

Wallrodt died on 2 July 2019 at the age of 67.

== Career ==
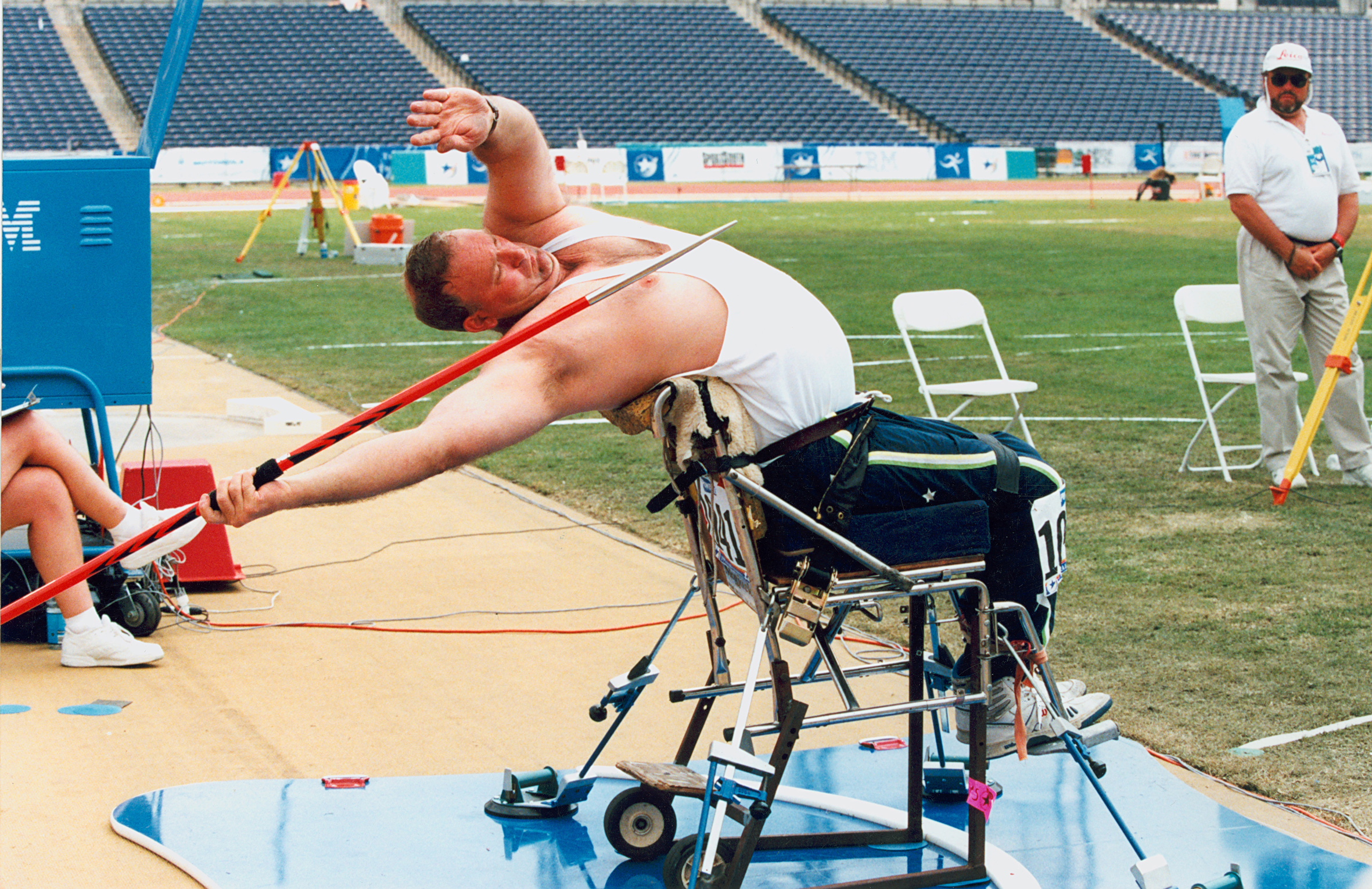
Bruce Wallrodt prepares to throw in the F53 seated javelin event in which he won a bronze medal at the 1996 Atlanta Paralympics

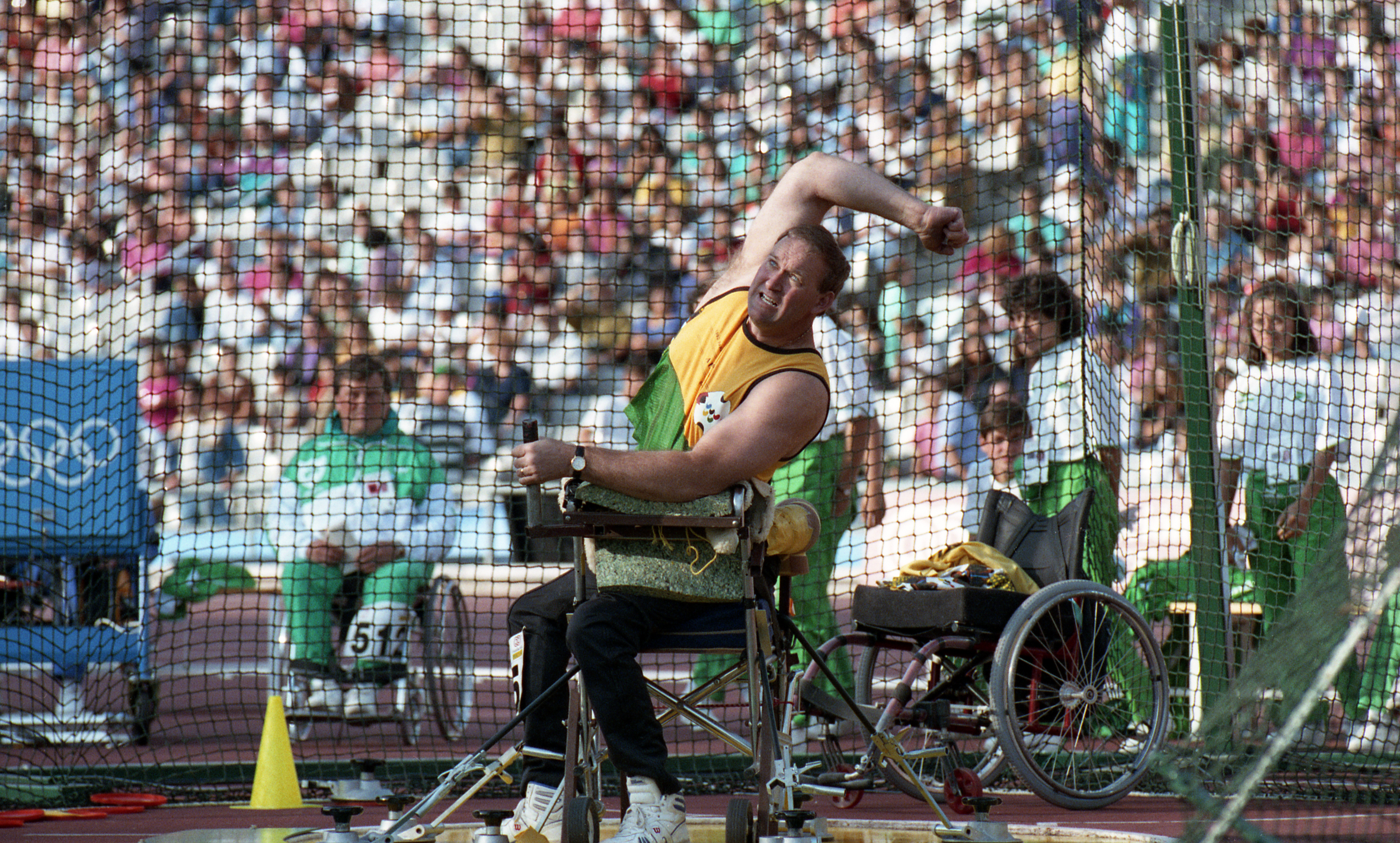
Bruce Wallrodt throwing discus at 1992 Paralympics

Sport to me was an extended arm of the rehabilitation process and made me realise that there was little that I could not do even if I had to do it from a wheelchair. Competing and mixing with my peers showed me that the upper limits of my capabilities were far greater than I had thought possible. Sport opened up many doors that seemingly would have remained closed had I not been involved with it. There is mot a lot a person in a chair cannot do if they put their minds to it.

— Bruce Wallrodt

In the 1988 Seoul Games, Wallrodt won two gold medals in the Men's Shot Put 2 and the Men's Javelin 2 events, and a bronze medal in the Men's Discus 2 event. At the 1990 World Championships and Games for the Disabled in Assen, Netherlands he won gold medals in the Men's Shot Put and Discus F4 events. At the 1992 Barcelona Games, he won a gold medal in the Men's Javelin THW4 event (for which he received a Medal of The Order of Australia), and two silver medals in the Men's Discus THW4 and the Men's Shot Put THW4 events. Going into the 1992 Games, he was a world record holder in discus, javelin and shot put. In the 1996 Atlanta Games, he won a gold medal in the Men's Shot Put F53 event, in which he broke a world record, and a bronze medal in the Men's Javelin F53 event. In 2000, he received an Australian Sports Medal. He won a silver medal at the 2000 Sydney Games in the men's shot put T54 event and came 4th in the Men's Javelin F54 – event. At the 2004 Athens Games, he came fifth in both the Men's Javelin F54 and the Men's Shot Put F54 events.
