= Robert Biancucci =

Australian Paralympic athlete

Personal information
- Nationality: Australia
Medal record
Men's para athletics
Representing Australia
Paralympic Games
Gold medal – first place	1988 Seoul	800 m C8
Silver medal – second place	1988 Seoul	400 m C8
Bronze medal – third place	1988 Seoul	200 m C8

Robert Michael Biancucci is an Australian Paralympic athlete. At the 1988 Seoul Games, he won a gold medal in the Men's 800 m C8 event, a silver medal in the Men's 400 m C8 event, and a bronze medal in the Men's 200 m C8 event. He competed but did not win any medals at the 1992 Barcelona Games.
