= Mandy Maywood =

Australian Paralympic swimmer

Personal information
- Full name: Mandy Nicole Maywood
- Nationality: Australia
- Born: 1974 (age 51–52)
Medal record
Swimming
Paralympic Games
Gold medal – first place	1992 Barcelona	Women's 100 m Breaststroke B3
Silver medal – second place	1988 Seoul Games	Women's 50 m Breaststroke B3
Bronze medal – third place	1988 Seoul Games	Women's 100 m Breaststroke B3
Bronze medal – third place	1988 Seoul Games	Women's 200 m Breaststroke B3
Bronze medal – third place	1992 Barcelona	Women's 200 m Breaststroke B1–3
World Championships and Games for the Disabled
Gold medal – first place	1990 Assen	Women's 100m Breaststroke B3
Gold medal – first place	1990 Assen	Women's 200m Breaststroke B3
Silver medal – second place	1990 Assen	Women's 200m Individual Medley B3

Mandy Nicole Maywood, OAM (born 1974) is an Australian visually impaired Paralympic swimmer. At the 1988 Seoul Games, she won a silver medal in the Women's 50 m Breaststroke B3 event, and two bronze medals in the Women's 100 m Breaststroke B3 and Women's 200 m Breaststroke B3 events. At the 1992 Barcelona Games, she won a gold medal in the Women's 100 m Breaststroke B3 event, for which she received a Medal of the Order of Australia, and a bronze medal in the Women's 200 m Breaststroke B1–3 event. In 2000, she received an Australian Sports Medal.
