= Neville Read =

Personal information
- Nationality: Australia
- Born: 15 March 1949
- Died: 21 December 2014 (aged 65)
Medal record
Lawn bowls
Paralympic Games
Bronze medal – third place	1988 Seoul	Men's Singles 2–6

Neville Albert Read (15 March 1949 – 21 December 2014) was an Australian Paralympic lawn bowls player. He won a bronze medal at the 1988 Seoul Games in the Men's Wheelchair Singles 2–6 event. He also competed at the 2002 Commonwealth Games, winning a bronze medal in the Men's Triples Physically Disabled.
