= Adrian Lowe =

Australian Paralympic athlete

Personal information
- Nationality: Australia
Medal record
Men's para athletics
Representing Australia
Paralympic Games
Gold medal – first place	1988 Seoul	4x100 m Relay A2A4-7
Gold medal – first place	1988 Seoul	4x400 m Relay A2A4-7
Silver medal – second place	1988 Seoul	100 m A4A9
Silver medal – second place	1988 Seoul	200 m A4A9
Silver medal – second place	1988 Seoul	400 m A4A9

Adrian Lowe is a leg amputee Australian Paralympic athlete. At the 1988 Seoul Games, he won two gold medals in the Men's 4 × 100 m Relay A2A4-7 and Men's 4 × 400 m Relay A2A4-7 events, and three silver medals in the Men's 100 m A4A9, Men's 200 m A4A9, and Men's 400 m A4A9 events.

Lowe was originally interested in competing swimming but was moved to athletics after 1987 Australian National Amputee Games. He was coached by Colin Wright at the Rotary Athletics Field in Chatswood, New South Wales. Lowe was born with a congenital deformity and at the age of four his right leg was amputated. He was 16 at the time of the 1988 Seoul Games and attended Fort Street High School in Petersham, New South Wales. During the Games, he shaved his head leaving a V for victory mohawk hairstyle.
