= Nicolás Ledezma =

Mexican Paralympic athlete

Medal record

Paralympic athletics

Representing Mexico

Paralympic Games
Bronze medal – third place	1996 Atlanta	Marathon T10
Bronze medal – third place	2000 Sydney	5000m T10

Parapan American Games
Bronze medal – third place	2007 Rio de Janeiro	1500m T11

Nicolás Ledezma is a paralympic athlete from Mexico competing mainly in category T11 long-distance events.

Nicolas won a bronze medal in the T10 marathon in the 1996 Summer Paralympics. He could not improve on this performance in the 2000 Summer Paralympics despite competing in the 1500m, 5000m, 10000m and marathon only winning the bronze in the 5000m.
