= Karen Gill =

Australian Paralympic athlete

Personal information
- Nationality: Australia
Medal record
Women's para athletics
Representing Australia
Paralympic Games
Silver medal – second place	1988 Seoul	Javelin throw C3

Karen Gill from Western Australia is an Australian Paralympic athlete. She won a silver medal at the 1988 Seoul Games in the Women's Javelin C3 event.
