= Judith Young (swimmer) =

Australian Paralympic swimmer

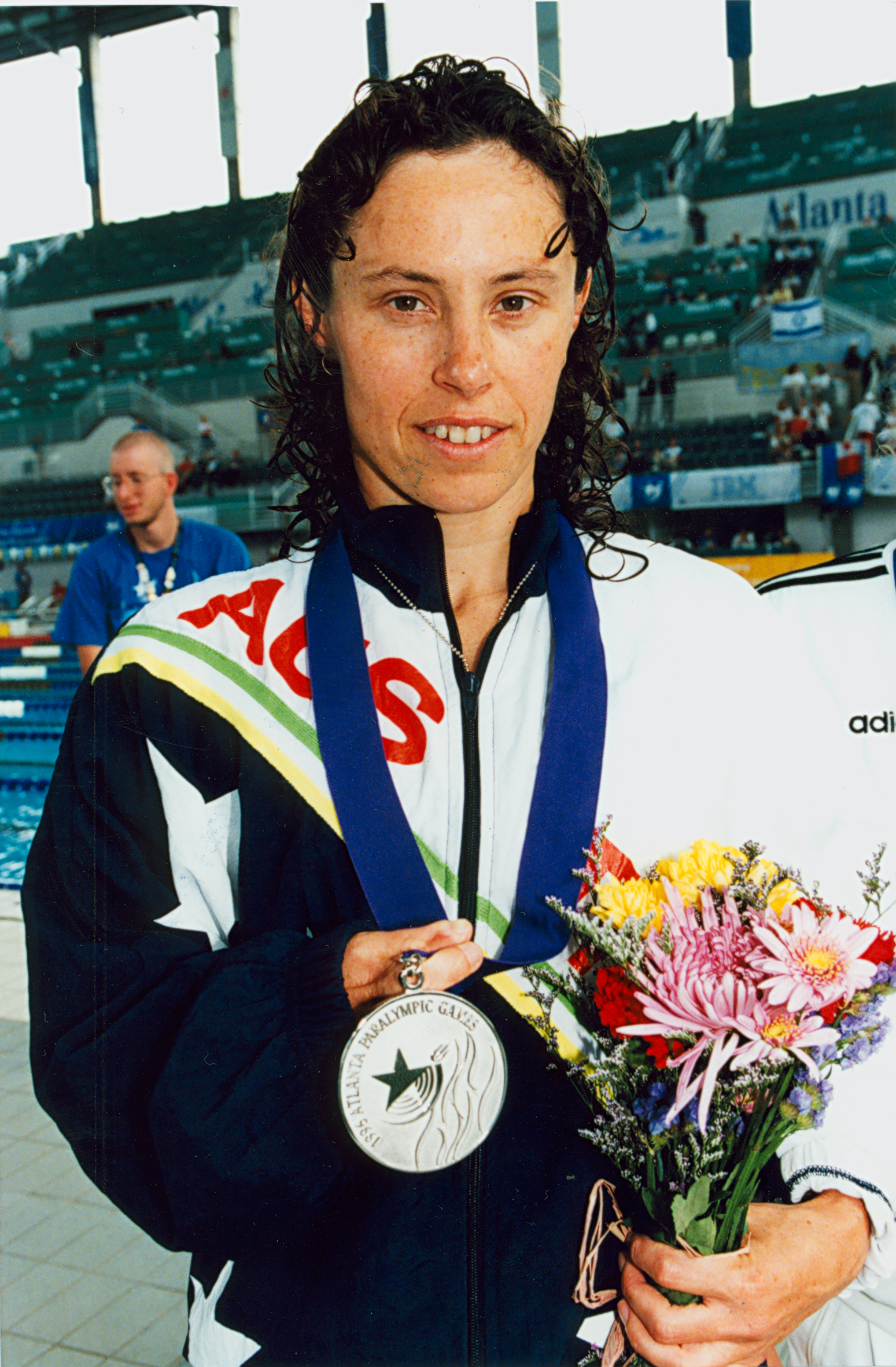
- Judith Young at the 1996 Atlanta Paralympics showing her silver medal won in the 100 m butterfly

Personal information
- Nationality: Australia
- Born: 16 January 1966 (age 60) Melbourne, Victoria
Medal record
Swimming
Paralympic Games
Gold medal – first place	1988 Seoul	Women's 100 m Backstroke A8
Gold medal – first place	1988 Seoul	Women's 400 m Freestyle A8
Silver medal – second place	1988 Seoul	Women's 100 m Breaststroke A8
Silver medal – second place	1988 Seoul	Women's 100 m Butterfly L6
Silver medal – second place	1988 Seoul	Women's 200 m Individual Medley L6
Silver medal – second place	1992 Barcelona	Women's 50 m Freestyle S10
Silver medal – second place	1996 Atlanta	Women's 100 m Breaststroke SB10
Silver medal – second place	1996 Atlanta	Women's 100 m Butterfly S10
Silver medal – second place	1996 Atlanta	Women's 50 m Freestyle S10
Bronze medal – third place	1992 Barcelona	Women's 100 m Butterfly S10
Bronze medal – third place	1992 Barcelona	Women's 200 m Individual SM10
Bronze medal – third place	1996 Atlanta	Women's 100 m Backstroke S10
World Championships and Games for the Disabled
Gold medal – first place	1990 Assen	Women's 100 m Butterfly S10
Gold medal – first place	1990 Assen	Women's 4x100 m Freestyle Relay S7
Silver medal – second place	1990 Assen	Women's 200 m Individual Medley SM10
Silver medal – second place	1990 Assen	Women's 100 m Backstroke S10
Silver medal – second place	1990 Assen	Women's 4x100 m Freestyle Relay S10
Bronze medal – third place	1990 Assen	Women's 50 m Freestyle S10
IPC Swimming World Championships
Silver medal – second place	1994 Valletta	50 m Freestyle S10
Silver medal – second place	1994 Valletta	100 m Freestyle S10
Bronze medal – third place	1994 Valletta	200 m Individual Medley SM10

Judith Joan Young (born 16 January 1966) is an Australian Paralympic swimmer. She was born in Melbourne. Young, who has a birth defect in her arm, was one of the first people to receive an Australian Institute of Sport Athletes with a Disability residential scholarship, from 1993 to 1996. She was coached by Peter Freney with assistance from Jim Fowlie.

At the 1988 Seoul Games, she won two gold medals in the Women's 100 m Backstroke A8 and Women's 400 m Freestyle A8 events, and three silver medals in the Women's 100 m Butterfly L6, Women's 100 m Breaststroke A8 and Women's 200 m Individual Medley L6 events. At the Games, Young faced a protest over her below-the-elbow amputee classification because of the degree of use she received from her arm with the birth defect. The appeal was successful and Young was classified as les autres. She was allowed to keep her three A8 medals, but the two world records set were nullified.

Young won two gold medals, three silver medals, and a bronze medal at the 1990 World Championships and Games for the Disabled in Assen, the Netherlands.

At the 1992 Barcelona Games, Young won a silver medal in the Women's 50 m Freestyle S10 event and two bronze medals in the Women's 100 m Butterfly S10 and Women's 200 Individual Medley SM10 events. She competed in four other events. At the 1996 Atlanta Games, she won three silver medals in the Women's 100 m Breaststroke SB10, Women's 100 m Butterfly S10 and Women's 50 m Freestyle S10 events and a bronze medal in the Women's 100 m Backstroke S10 event.
