= Harumi Yanagawa =

Japanese Paralympic athlete

Medal record

Paralympic athletics

Representing Japan

Paralympic Games
Gold medal – first place	1996 Atlanta	Marathon - T10

Harumi Yanagawa (柳川 春己, Yanagawa Harumi) is a Japanese paralympic athlete competing mainly in category T11 long-distance events.

Harumi competed in both the 5000m and marathon in both the 1992 finishing in sixth place and 1996 Summer Paralympics winning the gold in the marathon at the 1996 games. He also competed in the marathon in 2000 but in attempting to defend his title he could only manage sixth place.

Harumi is from Saga, Japan and currently operates an acupuncture clinic in Fukuoka.
