= Jason Smart (Paralympian) =

Australian Paralympic athlete

Personal information
- Nationality: Australia
Medal record
Athletics
Paralympic Games
Gold medal – first place	1988 Seoul	Men's 4x100 m Relay A2A4-7

Jason Smart is an Australian Paralympic athlete. He won a gold medal at the 1988 Seoul Games in the Men's 4 × 100 m Relay A2A4-7 event.
