= Australia at the 1992 Paralympic Games for persons with Mental Handicap =

Australia at the 1992 Paralympics Games for Persons with Mental Handicap
- IPC code: AUS
- NPC: Australian Paralympic Committee
- Website: www.paralympic.org.au
- Competitors: 51 in 4 sports
- Officials: 18
- Medals Ranked 1st: Gold 13 Silver 10 Bronze 8 Total 31

Summer appearances
- 1960; 1964; 1968; 1972; 1976; 1980; 1984; 1988; 1992; 1996; 2000; 2004; 2008; 2012; 2016; 2020; 2024

Australia participated at the first and only Paralympic Games for Persons with Mental Handicap held in Madrid, Spain from 15–22 September 1992. The Games followed the 1992 Summer Paralympics held in Barcelona, Spain.

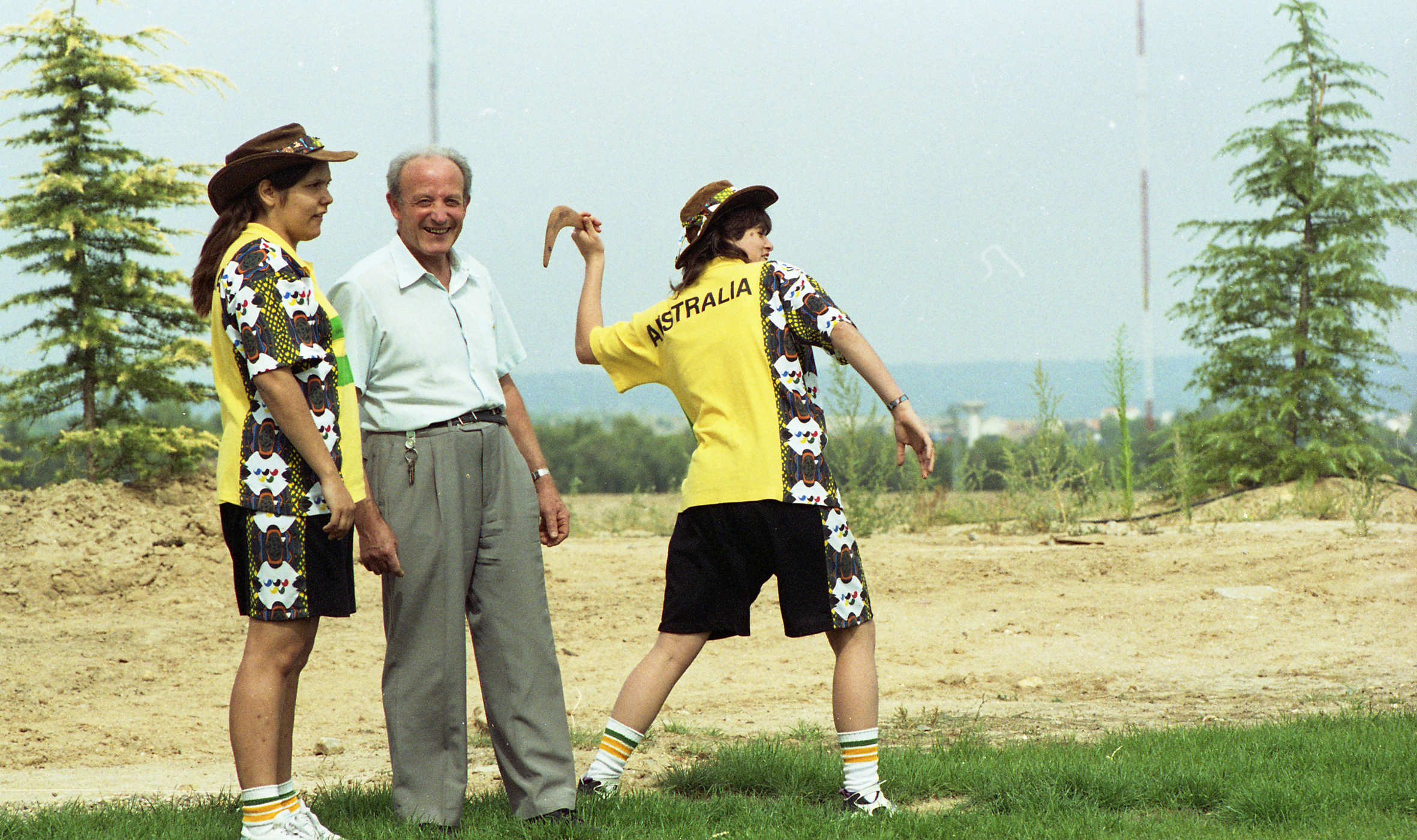
Indigenous Australian athletes Alice Toogood and Donna Burns demonstrate throwing the boomerang at the 1992 Madrid Games

1600 athletes from 75 countries from competed in 5 sports – athletics, basketball, futsal, swimming and table tennis. Australian Team comprised 51 athletes and 18 officials. It competed in all sports except table tennis.

Australia finished first on the medal tally with 31 medals – 13 gold, 10 silver and 8 bronze medals. Russell Torrance was the male team captain and Sarah-Jane Schulze was the women's team captain.

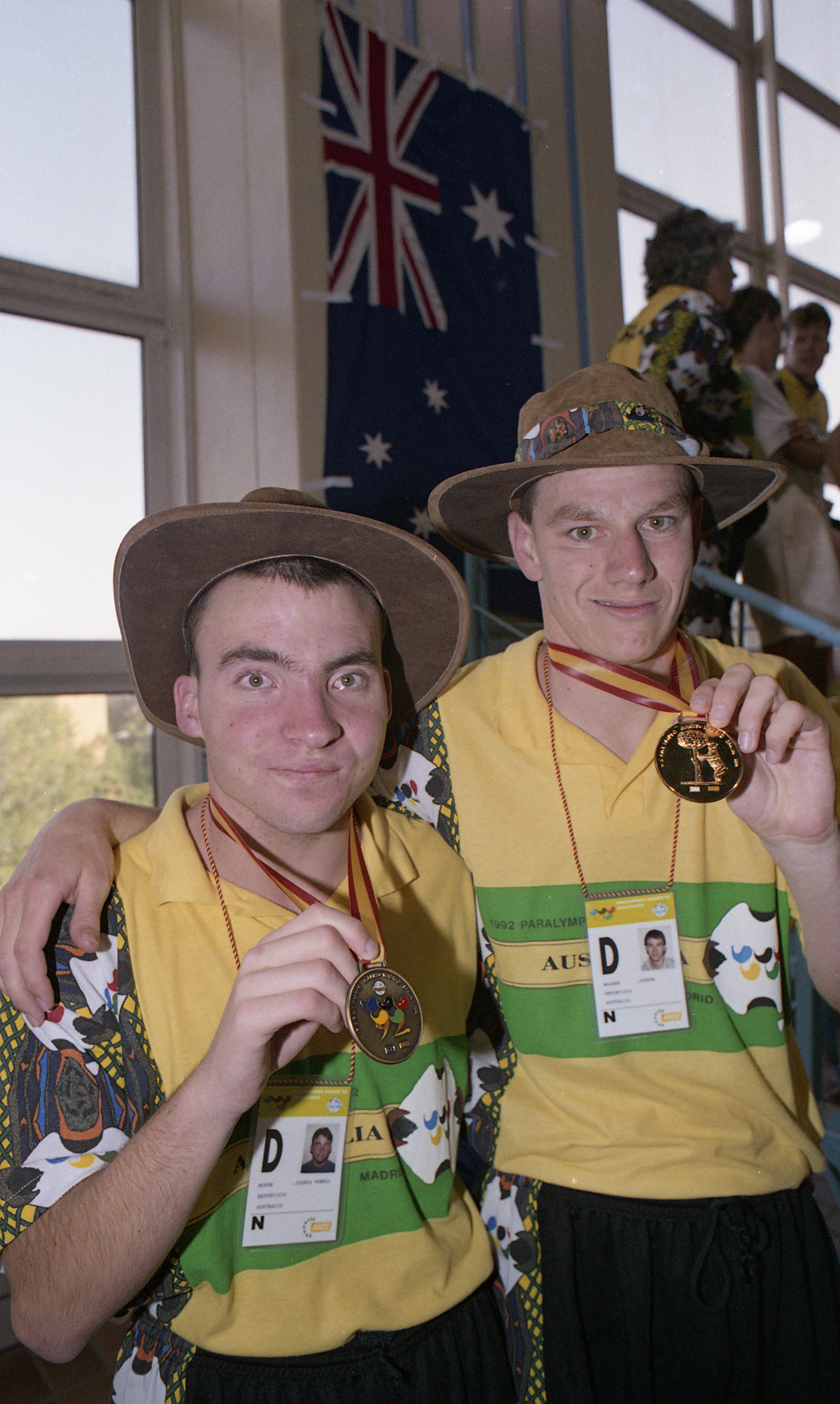
Multiple medalists Joshua Hofer (left) with Joseph Walker (right) at the Madrid Games

Swimmer Joseph Walker won nine gold medals and newspaper reports likened his medal success to multiple Olympic gold medalist Mark Spitz. Simmers Joshua Hofer and Rene Hardenbol won five gold medals. Women's basketball team known as the Pearls won the gold medal.

When the athletes from Madrid arrived home they were specifically invited at the public reception in Sydney. Marie Little described what this meant to those who were involved in the Madrid competition: I don’t think any participant will experience a similar feeling ever – the superb Fairstar dinner and the unbelievable Tickertape Parade were mind blowing – my heart was pumping, my eyes misty, my throat choked – in the crowd British Airways staff, bankers and paper sellers, little kids and their mums and dads, people in wheelchairs and bouncing babies – bands and music, sunshine and cheers. Little concluded: ‘Thanks to all for thanking the Paralympians’.

== Medalists ==
Medal	Name	Sport	Event
Gold	Anton Flavel	Athletics	Men's Javelin
Gold	Australia women's team (Pearls): Lorraine Archer; Tanya Aitchison; Donna Burns; Gladys Delaney; Melissa Gallagher; Fiona Hinds; Christine Humphries; Annette Kelly; Tina Kenna; Alice Toogood	Basketball	Women's Event
Gold	Joseph Walker	Swimming	Men's 100 m Freestyle
Gold	Joseph Walker	Swimming	Men's 200 m Freestyle
Gold	Joseph Walker	Swimming	Men's 400 m Freestyle
Gold	Joseph Walker	Swimming	Men's 50 m Butterfly
Gold	Joseph Walker	Swimming	Men's 100 m Butterfly
Gold	Rene Hardenbol	Swimming	Men's 200 m Backstroke
Gold	Joshua Hofer	Swimming	Men's 100 m Backstroke
Gold	Joseph Walker, Joshua Hofer, Rene Hardenbol, Jason Cooper	Swimming	Men's 4 x 50 m Freestyle Relay
Gold	Joseph Walker, Joshua Hofer, Rene Hardenbol, Jason Cooper	Swimming	Men's 4 × 100 m Freestyle Relay
Gold	Joseph Walker, Joshua Hofer, Rene Hardenbol, Jason Cooper	Swimming	Men's 4 x 50 m Medley Relay
Gold	Joseph Walker, Joshua Hofer, Rene Hardenbol, Jason Cooper	Swimming	Men's 4 × 100 m Medley Relay
Silver	Madelyn Ehlers	Athletics	Women's Shot Put
Silver	Madelyn Ehlers	Athletics	Women's Discus
Silver	Paul Mitchell	Athletics	Men's 1500 m
Silver	Rene Hardenbol	Swimming	Men's 100 m Freestyle
Silver	Rene Hardenbol	Swimming	Men's 200 m Breaststroke
Silver	Joshua Hofer	Swimming	Men's 50 m Butterfly
Silver	Joshua Hofer	Swimming	Men's 100 m Butterfly
Silver	Joshua Hofer	Swimming	Men's 50 m Backstroke
Silver	Joshua Hofer	Swimming	Men's 200 m Backstroke
Silver	Justine Van Eyssen, Stacey Smith, Brigid Bromhead, Sarah-Jane Schulze	Swimming	Women's 4 × 100 m Freestyle
Bronze	Anton Flavel	Athletics	Men's High Jump
Bronze	Anton Flavel	Athletics	Men's Discus
Bronze	Kaye Freeman	Athletics	Women's Javelin
Bronze	Racquel Nugent	Athletics	Women's Long Jump
Bronze	Joshua Hofer	Swimming	Men's 200 m Freestyle
Bronze	Joshua Hofer	Swimming	Men's 400 m Freestyle
Bronze	Justine Van Eyssen, Stacey Smith, Brigid Bromhead, Sarah-Jane Schulze	Swimming	Women's 4 x 50 m Freestyle Relay
Bronze	Justine Van Eyssen, Stacey Smith, Brigid Bromhead, Sarah-Jane Schulze	Swimming	Women's 4 x 50 m Medley Relay

== Administration ==
Chef de Mission – Marie Little, General Team Manager – Jan Sutherland, Administrator – Colleen Bennett, Media Director – Paul Griffiths
Doctor – Susan White, Physiotherapist – Barbara Denson

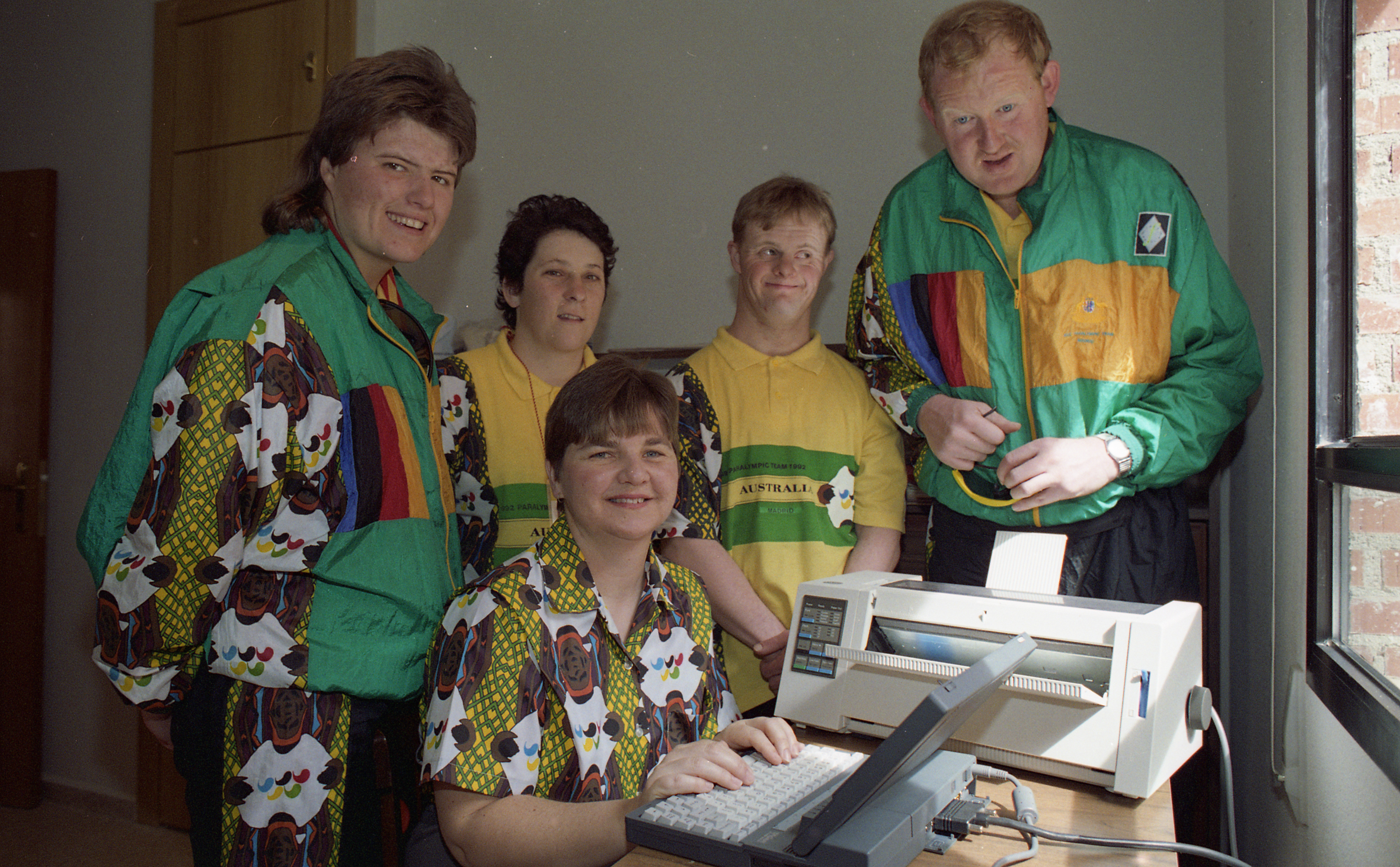
Athletes Stacey Smith (NSW), Tina Kenna (Tasmania), Tim Krahe (South Australia), Michael Glover (Tasmania) with Team administrator Colleen Bennett in the Australian Team office during the 1992 Madrid Games

.

== Events ==
=== Athletics ===
Athletics team: 12 athletes.
Women – Madelyn Ehlers, Kaye Freeman, Norma Koplick, Racquel Nugent, Anne Walsh
Men – Wayne Bauer, Anton Flavel, Paul Mitchell, Jason Newman, Michael Stevens, Russell Torrance, Wayne Wright
Coach – Scott Goodman, Robyn Hanson (Assistant) ; Manager – Wendy Ey

Results: Six athletes won medals with Anton Flavel winning one gold and two bronze medals.

=== Basketball ===
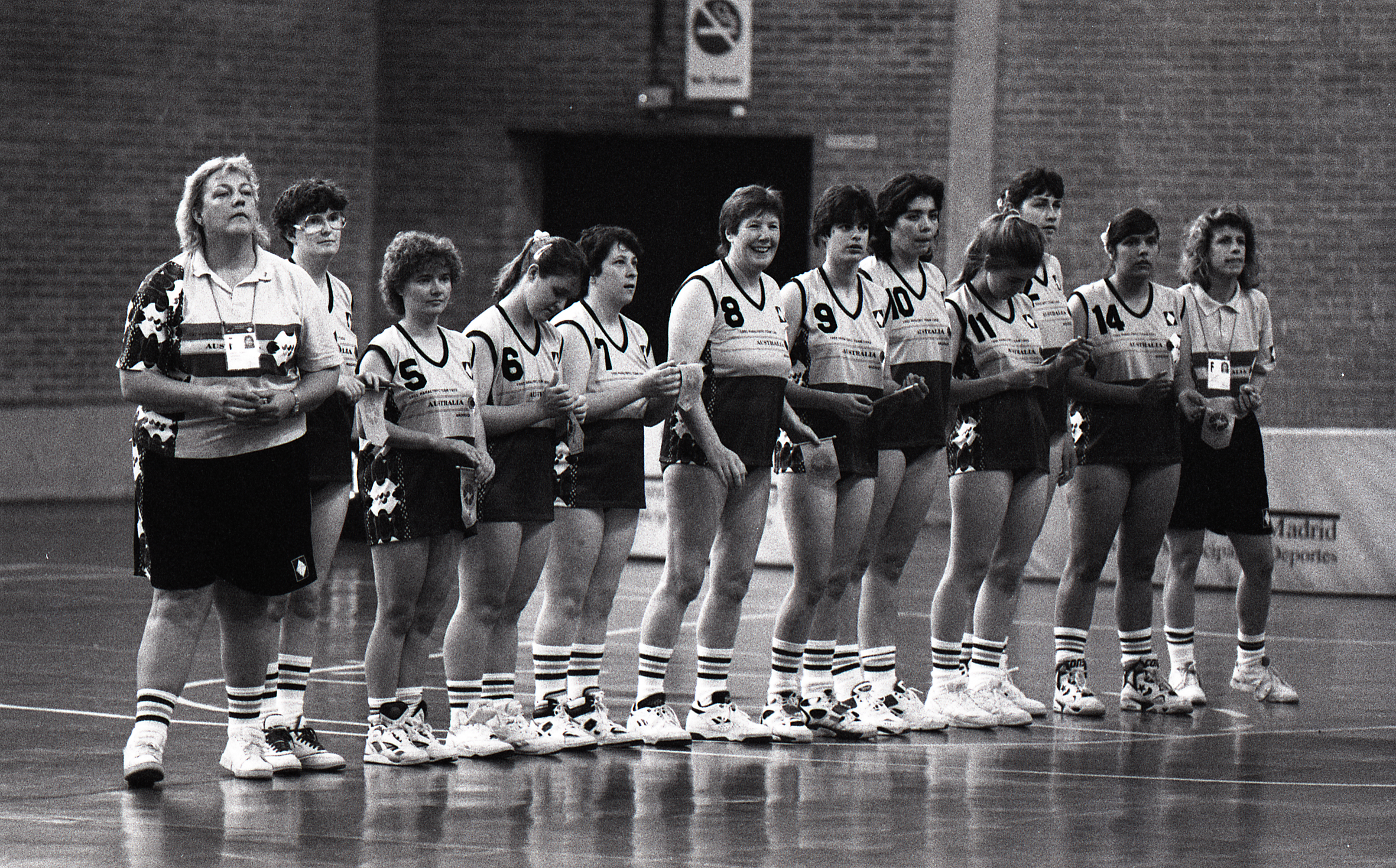
The Australian women's basketball team for players with an intellectual disability, the Pearls, lines up before a game at the 1992 Madrid Paralympic Games for Persons with Mental Handicap. The team won the gold medal. From left to right: Margaret Sheriff (Women's Head Coach), Tanya Aitchison (4), Lorraine Archer (5), Fiona Hinds (6), Tina Kenna (7), Gladys Delaney VIC (8) Donna Burns VIC (9), Christine Humphries VIC (10), Melissa Gallacher SA (11), Annette kelly SA (12), Alice Toogood SA (14), Robyn Smith (Manager)

Basketball teams: 20 athletes.
Women (Pearls) – Lorraine Archer, Tanya Aitchison, Donna Burns, Gladys Delaney, Melissa Gallacher, Fiona Hinds, Annette Kelly, Tina Kenna, Christine Humphries, Alice Toogood Coach – Margaret Sheriff; Manager – Robyn Smith

Results: defeated France 48-27 (Donna Burns 22 points); defeated Greece 47 – 32 (Donna Burns 31 points); defeated Brazil 65 – 14 (Donna Burns 36 points, Christine Humphries 13 points) ; defeated Great Britain 60 – 19 (Annette Kelly 18 points, Alice Toogood 12 points, Donna Burns 12 points). Final – defeated Greece 53 – 21 (Donna Burns 24 points, Christine Humphries 14 points, Alice Toogood 8 points, Annette Kelly 7 points). When the Australian women's basketball team won the gold medal, the Canberra Times reported that: ‘the women's 53-21 drubbing of Greece was Australia's first medal win in Olympic or Paralympic Basketball’.

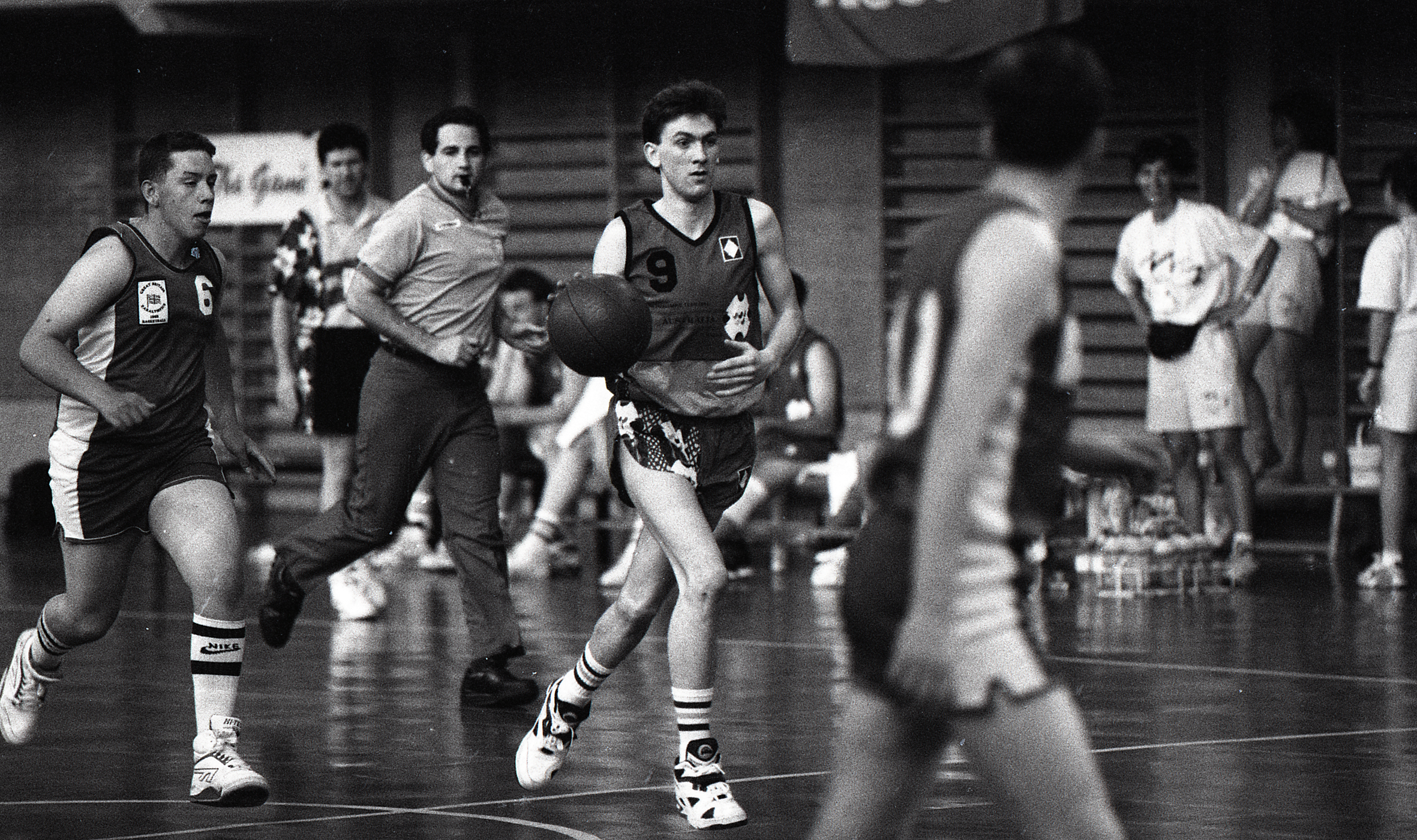
Australian team member Rodney Meddings at the Madrid Games

Men (Boomerangs) – Michael Aitchison, Michael Glover, David Henry, Tony Hopewell, Mark Konings, John Lettice, Rodney Meddings, Lee Medwin, Dean Papworth, John Wright Coach – Mark Walker (Head), Tony Guihot (Assistant)

Results: defeated Jordan 131-13 ; defeated Great Britain 65 – 20 (David Henry 28 points, Tony Hopewell 10 points); lost Dominican Republic 54-111 (Tony Hopewell 20 points, David Henry 14 points); lost 19-137 Puerto Rico. Team finished 7th.

=== Futsal ===
Futsal team: 10 athletes.
Team – Jurgen Berens, Stephen Choat, John Fitter, Mark Harvey, Rob Lewis, Luis Marcellino, Willy Moen, Raymond Neaves, John Ruiz, Tony Thompson Coaches – Terry Pearce (Head), Jack De Cesco (Assistant), Manager – Bruce Drake.

Results: defeated Czecho-Slovakia 5-1 (Mark Harvey 1, Stephen Choat 1, John Fitter 1, Rob Lewis 1, John Ruiz 1) ; lost Germany 3-7 (John Ruiz 2, Mark Harvey 1); defeated Colombia 6-0 (Ray Neaves 2, Mark Harvey 2, John Ruiz 2); lost Greece 0-5.

=== Swimming ===
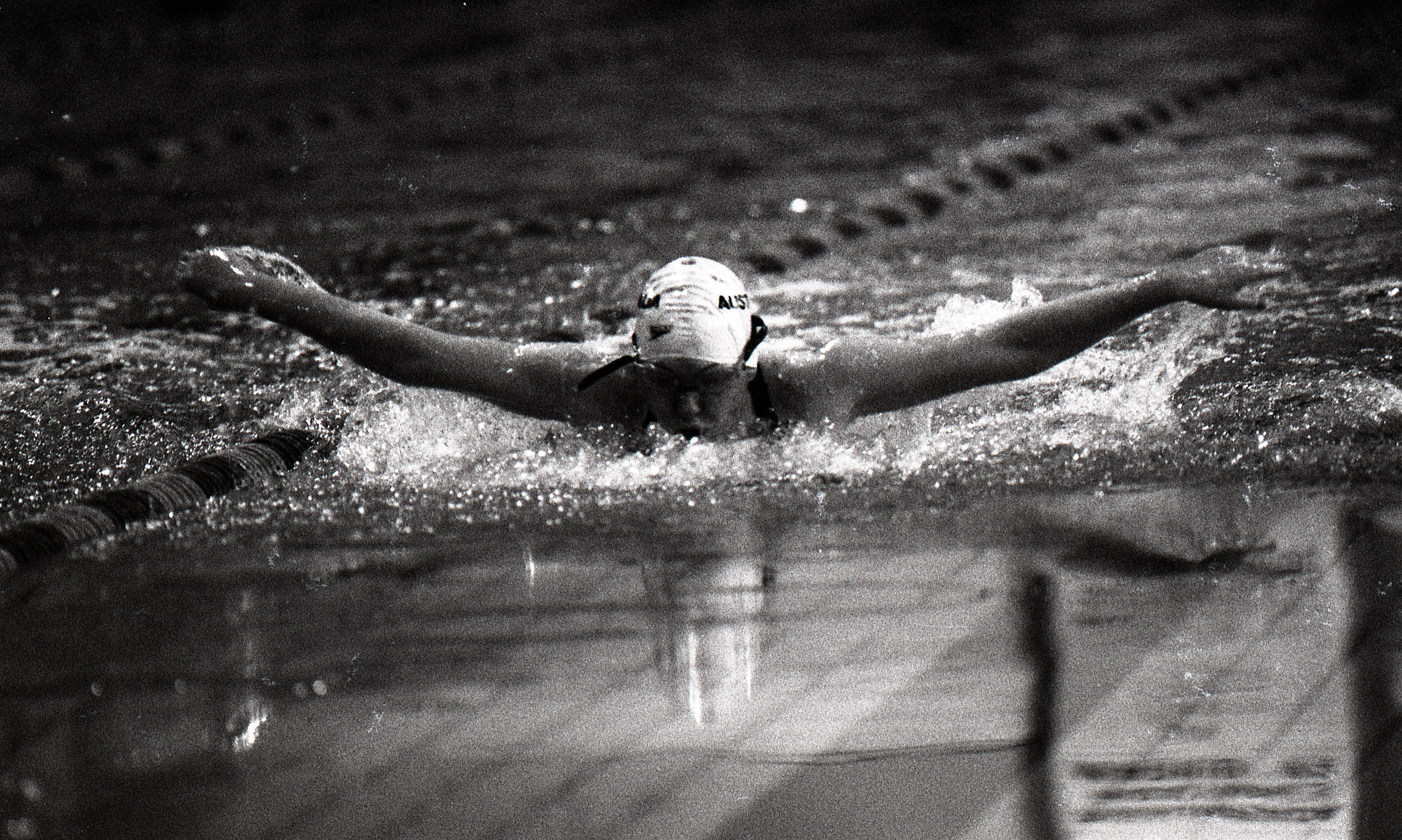
Sarah Jane Schulze at the Madrid Games

Swimming team: 9 athletes.
Women – Brigit Bromhead, Sarah Jane Schulze, Stacey Smith, Justine Van Eyssen
Men – Jason Cooper, Rene Hardenbol, Joshua Hofer, Tim Krahe, Joseph Walker
Coaches – John Boland (Head), Mark Lucas (Assistant) ; Manager – Jill Gates

Results: Australia finished first on the swimming medal tally winning 23 medals – 11 gold, 7 silver and 5 bronze medals. Joseph Walker won nine gold medals out of nine events which at the time was unmatched in Australia's Paralympic history. Joshua Hofer won eleven medals including five gold. Rene Hardenbol won seven medals including five gold. The Men's relay team won four gold medals in world record time. The women's relay team one a silver medal and two bronze medals.

=== Controversy ===
The most controversial dimension of the Madrid Games is their lack of formal recognition as an official Paralympic Games, even though the belief at the time was that the Madrid Games were part of the Summer Paralympic Games movement. For example, the Official Report by the Chef de Mission of the Australian team and AUSRAPID official, Marie Little, was entitled ‘Australian Paralympic Team Madrid’ and her opening comments reinforce the belief that the Madrid Games were part of the Paralympics: ‘The historical coming together of elite athletes with a disability [on the] Australian Team, albeit competing at two locations in the 1992 Summer Paralympics, Barcelona and Madrid, was a great achievement’. Furthermore, when the Queen's Birthday Awards were announced in 1993, the successes of athletes with an intellectually disability were acknowledged by OAMs with the dedication: ‘for service to sport as a gold medallist at the Paralympic Games, Madrid, 1992’. It is clear from these examples that Australian administrators, officials, competitors and media at the time assumed that the Madrid Games were part of the official Paralympic Games. Unfortunately the IPC does not officially recognise the Madrid Games and, consequently, does not acknowledge the competing athletes as Paralympians.

== See also ==
- Australia at the Paralympics
- Australia at the 1992 Summer Paralympics in Barcelona
- Images of the Australian Team at the Madrid Games
