= 1993 Queen's Birthday Honours (Australia) =

The 1993 Queen's Birthday Honours for Australia were announced on Monday 14 June 1993 by the office of the Governor-General.

The Birthday Honours were appointments by some of the 16 Commonwealth realms of Queen Elizabeth II to various orders and honours to reward and highlight good works by citizens of those countries. The Birthday Honours are awarded as part of the Queen's Official Birthday celebrations during the month of June.

== Order of Australia ==
=== Companion (AC) ===
==== General Division ====
Recipient	Citation	Notes
The Honourable Chief Justice John Murtagh Macrossan	For service to the law, to higher education and to the arts	
Professor Donald Metcalf, AO	For service to medicine through scientific research, particularly cancer research	
Sir Arvi (Hillar) Parbo	For service to the mining industry and to commerce	
Professor Ralph Owen Slatyer, AO	For service to science and technology and it application to industry development	
Richard Arthur Woolcott, AO	For service to international relations and to Asia Pacific economic cooperation	

=== Officer (AO) ===
==== General Division ====
Recipient	Citation	Notes
Sallyanne Atkinson	For service to the community and local government	
Professor Bruce Harry Bennett	For service to education and to Australian literary studies	
The Honourable John Joseph Brown	For service to the Australian Parliament, tourism and sport and recreation	
Professor Henry George Burger	For service to medical research, particularly in the field of endocrinology	
Emeritus Professor Neil Edwin Carson	For service to education, particularly in the field of community medicine	
Dr Alison Laura Crook	For service as a librarian	
Anne Barbara Deveson, AM	For service to community health, particularly through increasing the public awareness of schizophrenia and to the media	
Dr Murray William Elliott	For service to medicine, particularly in the fields of obstetrics and gynaecology	
James Oswald Fairfax	For service to the arts and to the community	
Professor Ross Gregory Garnaut	For service to education, particularly in the field of economics and to international relations	
Dr Olga Margaret Garson	For service to medical research and education, particularly in the field of cytogenetics	
Professor Walter Ernest Glover	For service to medical education, particularly in the fields of physiology and pharmacology	
Francis John Hargrave	For service to industry, international relations and to the community	
Louis Kahan	For service to the arts	
Professor James Roland Lawrence	For service to medical education and to nephrology	
Professor Clement John Lloyd	For service to journalism, education, politics and public policy	
Professor John Francis Lovering	For service to education and geology, particularly through Antarctic scientific research	
Sister Margaret Mary McGovern	For service to social welfare and to the community	
Dr Geoffrey Lee Miller	For service to primary industry, particularly in the area of agricultural economics and to international relations	
Professor Ronald Penny	For service to medical research and education, particularly in the field of clinical immunology	
The Honourable Gordon Glen Denton Scholes	For service to the Australian Parliament	
Samuel Smorgon	For service to the arts and to the community	
Sir Robert (John) Southey, CMG	For service to the arts, particularly through the Australian Ballet Foundation	
Emeritus Professor Derek Edward Tribe, OBE	For service to education, particularly in the field of agricultural science and to international relations	
The Honourable Tom Uren	For service to the Australian Parliament, to urban and regional development, the environment and the community	
Professor John Francis Bryant Uther	For service to medicine in the field of cardiology, particularly in the area of electrophysiology	
Lynette Noel Waite	For service to business management, particularly through advancing the development of women in management	
The Honourable William Charles Wentworth	For service to the Australian Parliament, particularly in relation to Aboriginal rights and to the standardisation of interstate rail gauges	
Helen Rodda Williams	For service to public administration, particularly in the areas of education and social welfare	

==== Military Division ====
Branch	Recipient	Citation	Notes
Navy	Commodore Clement John Littleton	For distinguished service to the Australian Defence Force, particularly as Director General Natural Disasters Organisation	
Army	Major General David John McLachlan, AM	For distinguished service to the Army as General Officer Commanding Logistic Command	
Air Force	Air Vice-Marshal Leslie Bruce Fisher, AM	For service to the Royal Australian Air Force as the Assistant Chief of the Defence Force (Operations)	

=== Member (AM) ===
==== General Division ====
Recipient	Citation	Notes
Robert Otto Albert, RFD RD	For services to the community, particularly in the field of education and to the arts	
Cameron Douglas Algie	For services to the business and commerce, particularly through co-operative building societies and to the community	
Dr Brian Edward John Ancell	For service to community Health, through St John Ambulance, Australia	
Edith May Backhouse	For service to education and industrial relations	
Dr Keith Reginald Barnes	For service to medicine, particularly in the fields of obstetrics and gynaecology	
Wallace Henry Belcher, QFSM	For service to the community and to the Queensland Fire Service	
Noila Jean Berglund	For service to education	
Robert Garth Boomer, OAM	For service to education, particularly through curriculum development	
George Kevin Boyd	For service to industrial relations, particularly through the clothing and allied trades union of Australia	
Alan George Brimblecombe	For service to the cotton growing industry	
Katharine Elizabeth Brisbane	For service to Australian drama, particularly as co-founder of Currency Press	
Reverend Dr John Percival Brown	For service to religion and to international relations, particularly through the mission movement	
Betty Margaret Burstall	For service to the performing arts	
Ian Fred Burston	For service to the mining industry	
Mary Patricia Cameron	For service to botanical and environmental conservation	
Gordon Ralph Chapman	For service to the community and horticulture	
John Singleton Chappel	For service to architecture, town planning and to local government	
Warren Frederick Martin Clemens, CBE	For service to the community	
Professor Michael George Clyne	For service to education, particularly in the field of linguistics	
Kenneth John Collins	For service to industrial relations, particularly through clothing and textiles trade unions	
Kenneth Walter Collins	For service to opera	
Dr Brian Thomas Collopy	For service to medicine, particularly through the development of health care standards	
Reverend Charles Osborne Leigh Cook	For service to education and the community	
Ronald Lewis Coppel	For service to the securities industries, particularly as executive director of the Australian Stock Exchange	
Ruth Hope Crow	For service to the community through the promotion of participative environmental and social planning	
Patricia Anne Davis-Hurst	For service to the Aboriginal people of the Manning Valley	
James Alexander Dixon	For service to the sugar industry	
Professor Thomas Clifford Dixon	For service to education through the development of the discipline of communication	
The Reverend Dr Clyde Morton Dominish	For service to the community through the Uniting Church in Australia and to the Christian and non-Christian faiths	
Dr Robert Bruce Macleay Dun	For service to international relations and to the advancement of developing countries as Director-General, Australian International Development Assistance Bureau	
Joan Lillian Englert	For service to nursing and to the development of professional standards and codes of behaviour	
The Honourable Hywel David Evans	For service to the Western Australian Parliament and to agriculture	
Peter Stewart Field	For service to international relations	
Anne Fraser	For service to the arts as a theatre set and costume designer	
Wrixon James Gasteen	For service to nature conservation and as an advocate for balanced land use management	
Kevin Rex Gilding	For service to senior secondary and tertiary education	
Clyde Gilmour, ISO	For service to aged people	
Ian Arthur Gittus	For service to the food industry and to the community	
Lynda Diane Goldsworthy	For service to conservation and the environment	
Susan Gordon	For service to Aboriginal people and to the community	
Valerie Beth Hallinan	For service to people with hearing impairments	
Francis Sutherland Hambly	For service to tertiary education as executive director, Australian Vice-Chancellors' Committee	
Gordon Graeme Hean	For service to local government and to the community	
Patricia Randall Heath, BEM	For service to community health and to the development of Australian health care standards	
Peter John Hidden	For service to the legal profession and to the community as Senior Public Defender, New South Wales	
Dr John Hans Hirshman	For service to international health, particularly in the field of health care in developing countries	
Kenneth Gregory Horler, QC	For service to the theatre, civil liberties and to the law	
David Gilmore Houston	For service to the community, particularly through improving access to education for isolated children	
Robert Edward Hoysted	For service to racehorse training and to the industrial welfare of trainers	
Dr Paul Hughes	For service to education, particularly through the development of Aboriginal educational policies	
Associate Professor Mervyn Bruce Hyde	For service in the field of education for the deaf in Australia and Indonesia	
Russell Goldfield Jack	For service to the preservation of Bendigo's Chinese heritage and culture	
William James Jonas	For service to the preservation and conservation of Aboriginal heritage and culture	
Diana Joy Jones	For service to the community and to blind and visually impaired people	
Michael George Kailis, CBE	For service to the fishing, shipbuilding and pearling industries and to the Greek community	
John William Kaldor	For service to the arts	
Ernest Joseph King	For service to swimming as a national and international representative coach	
Dr Donald William Kinsey	For service to reef ecology and to the conservation and management of marine environments	
Roc Kirby	For service to the entertainment industry	
Marcia Lynne Langton	For service as an anthropologist and advocate of Aboriginal issues	
Faith Geraldine Layton	For service to women, particularly through the Australian Federation of University Women, and to education	
Dr James Harrison Leavesley	For service to general medicine, particularly in the field of medical history	
Dr Ian Valentine Lishman	For service to medicine through the establishment of a surgical practice in the south-western region of Western Australia	
Graham Gordon Lovett	For service to sport, particularly in the field of administration	
Emeritus Professor Dennis Arthur Lowther	For service to medical research, particularly in the field of biochemistry	
Kevin John Macks	For service to architecture, particularly through the design of cyclone resistant buildings	
John James Mallick	For service to commerce, particularly in the insurance industry	
Betty May Marginson	For service to the welfare of the aged, to education and to local government	
Robert Lewis Maza	For service to the development of Aboriginal dramatic arts as an actor, playwright and producer	
Dr Janet McCredie	For service to medicine, particularly radiology, and the study of congenital abnormalities of the limbs of newborn babies	
Ian Stuart Campbell McEwen	For service to horse racing, and to the community through the organisation Diabetes Australia	
Helen McIntyre	For service to the credit union industry	
John Barry McLean	For service to the trade union movement, particularly through the Transport Workers Union	
Alderman John Edwin McNaughton	For service to local government and to the community	
Dr Brian Patrick Morgan	For service to medicine, particularly in the field of colorectal surgery	
Ann Veronica Moyal	For service to science and technology in Australia, particularly through the recording of its history	
The Honourable Peter Murphy, QC	For service to the law and to the community	
Dr John Crammond Nixon	For service to science and technology, particularly in the field of metallurgical engineering	
Vera Irene Norris	For service to women, particularly through the Country Women's Association	
Lin Onus	For service to the arts as a painter and sculptor and to the promotion of Aboriginal artists and their work	
Dr Philip Edward Parsons	For service to Australian drama, particularly as co-founder of Currency Press	
Colonel Peter Robert Patmore, RFD ED	For service to the community and to the Army Reserve	
Ronald Desmond Paul	For service to business and finance and to the community	
Alan Newbury Payne	For service to naval architecture as a designer of racing and cruising yachts	
Gwendoline Jean Plumb, BEM	For service to the entertainment industry as an actress and to the community as a fund raiser for charities	
Alderman David Allen Plumridge	For service to local government and to the community	
Professor Harry George Poulos	For service to engineering, particularly in the field of geomechanics study and research	
Dr Keith Cameron Powell	For service to medicine, particularly in the field of alcohol and drug treatment	
John William Robert Pratt	For service to people with disabilities, particularly those with cerebral palsy, and to the business community	
Robert Ray Quail	For service to people with disabilities	
Dr Allen Forrest Reid	For service to science and technology, particularly in the fields of minerals and energy	
Bertram Ainslie Roberts	For service to art, particularly through the interpretation of Aboriginal Dreamtime mythology	
Dr Margaret Mary Patricia Ryan	For service to medicine, particularly in the field of paediatrics	
Dr Albert Howard Saddler	For service to medicine, particularly in the field of environmental health of the Aboriginal communities of north-western Australia	
Haydn Gerald Sargent	For service to the sick and underprivileged in the community, particularly as a radio commentator	
Dinah Hilary Shearing	For service to the performing arts	
Kenneth Robert Short	For service to the community and to radio and television broadcasting	
Joseph Alexander Skrzynski	For service to the electronic media, particularly through the Australian Film, Television and Radio School	
Dr Ellice Simmons Swinbourne	For service to adult and tertiary education	
Dr John Harold Eaton Taplin	For service to the transport industry, particularly in the field of transport economics	
Victor Julius Techritz	For service to industrial relations	
Martin Halowell Thomas	For service to the engineering profession and to energy management	
Colleen Ann Thurgar	For service to the welfare of ex-service personnel and to the community	
Bruce Morison Treloar	For service to business and commerce, particularly in the retail industry	
The Honourable Neil Benjamin Trezise	For service to the Victorian Parliament and to sport	
Dr Ching Tang Tsiang	For service to the Chinese community and to medicine	
Robert Dragutin Vojakovic	For service to community health, particularly through the Asbestos Diseases Society in Western Australia	
The Honourable Raymond Sanders Watson	For service to law, particularly in the fields of family law and criminal law reform	
William Robert Alexander Wyllie	For service to business and commerce	

==== Military Division ====
Branch	Recipient	Citation	Notes
Navy	Captain Robert George Dagworthy	For service to the Royal Australian Navy and the Australian Defence Force as Defence Adviser, New Delhi	
Navy	Commodore Walter Samuel Bateman	For service to the Royal Australian Navy, in particularly as Director of the General Maritime Studies Programme	
Army	Brigadier Adrian Stuart D'Hage, MC	For service to the Army and the Defence Force in the field of operational planning and public information	
Army	Brigadier David Bruce Ferguson	For service to the Australian Army and the Defence Force, particularly in implementing change as the Director General Defence Force Plans and Programmes	
Army	Brigadier Grahame Leslie Hellyer	For distinguished service to the Defence Force in the development of facilities as the Director General Accommodation and Works	
Army	Lieutenant Colonel Wayne Raymond Jackson	For exemplary service to the army in the field of logistics	
Army	Major Mark Probert	For exceptional service to General Reserve, particularly 9 Brigade	
Army	Lieutenant Colonel Peter Louis Pursey	For exceptional service as the Commanding Officer of 2nd/4th Battalion, The Royal Australian Regiment	
Army	Lieutenant Colonel Paul Alfred Riley, RFD	For exceptional service to the Army as Commanding Officer of 87 Battalion, The Royal Victoria Regiment	
Air Force	Wing Commander Suresh Chandra Babu	For service to the Royal Australian Air Force as Senior Medical Officer RAAF Base Edinburgh	
Air Force	Group Captain Gareth Nelson Chandler	For service to the Royal Australian Air Force as the inaugural Director of Logistics and Evaluation HQ Logistics Command	
Air Force	Group Captain Kerry Francis Clarke	For service to the Royal Australian Air Force as Commanding Officer No 2 Operational Conversion Unit	
Air Force	Wing Commander Norman Arthur Gray	For exceptional service to the Royal Australian Air Force as the commanding Officer of the School of Air Navigation	
Air Force	Squadron Leader Robert Kemp	For exceptional service to the Royal Australian Air Force as Senior Administration Officer No 501 Wing	
Air Force	Wing Commander Harry Gomer Mayhew	For exceptional service to the Royal Australian Air Force as Commanding Officer No 37 Squadron	
Air Force	Air Vice-Marshal Donald Arthur Ernest Tidd, MBE	For exceptional service to the Royal Australian Air Force as Director General Logistics, Air Force	

=== Medal (OAM) ===
==== General Division ====
Recipient	Citation	Notes
Virginia Margaret-Ann Adlide	For service to the families of seriously ill children through Ronald McDonald House	
Henry William Aitken	For service to the community and local government	
Stanley Clifford Alchin	For services to psychiatric nursing	
Peter Charles Alexander, CMG OBE	For services to veterans and to the Scottish Celtic community	
Leslie Alexander Anderson	For service to the community	
Laurence Stanley Andriske	For service to local government	
Clarence William Arbuckle	For service to health as CEO, Wesley Hospital, Auchenflower	
Lorraine Margaret Archer	For service to sport as a gold medallist at the Paralympic Games, Madrid 1992	
Dr Louis Charles Ariotti, MBE	For service to medicine as a surgeon and radiologist	
Tanya Ann Atcheson	For service to sport as a gold medallist at the Paralympic Games, Madrid	
Grace Millicent Atkinson	For service to the aged through St Annes Nursing Home and Hostel	
Maisie Pauline Austin	For service to sport, particularly basketball	
Daniel William Austin	For service to the print media, particularly through the Regional Press	
John Gordon Bain	For service to the Australian Rugby Union football as a player and Australian selector	
Kenneth Lawrence Bannister	For service to the community through Lifeline and the Gold Coast Homeless Youth Project Inc	
Tracy Lee Barrell	For service to sport as a gold medallist at the Paralympic Games, Barcelona 1992	
Jacqueline Barrett	For service to the community, particularly through the SID's Association, NSW	
Denis Joseph Barritt	For service to the community and the law	
Alfred David Basheer	For service to the tourism and hospitality industry, particularly through the Australian Hotels Association	
Phyllis Eileen Batchelor	For service to the performing arts as a composer, pianist and teacher	
Margaret Winifred Beardwood	For service to the community	
Rex Cyril Daniel Bennett	For service to the community and to the road transport industry	
Lorna Bennetts	For service to local government and to conservation and the environment	
Dorothy Elizabeth Betty	For service to women, particularly through the National Council of Women, NSW	
Lloyd Henry Bird	For service to botany and conservation	
Reginald James Percival Bishop	For service to youth through teaching and conducting brass band music	
Vera Jessie Victoria Blood	For service to the community and nursing	
Raymond Botto	For service to the sugar industry and to the community	
Bruce Leonard Bowley	For service to hockey and to cricket as a player, coach and administrator	
Sydney John Bradley	For service to veterans	
Hedley Murray Bray	For service to health through the Australian Medic Alert Foundation Inc and to the community	
The Hon Ernest Francis Bridge	For service to the WA Parliament and to Aboriginal Affairs	
Brian Ernest Austin Brown	For service to the performing arts as a jazz performer, educator and composer	
Stanley Bryant	For service to the manufacturing industry	
Donna Burns	For service to sport as a gold medalist at the Paralympic Games, Madrid 1992	
Kenneth Graeme Burrows	For service to the Public Service, particularly in the field of marine cartography	
Zona Gladys Burston	For service to the community	
Allan Robert Butler	For service to the sport as a gold medalist at the Paralympic Games, Barcelona 1992	
Archibald William Cameron	For service to history and to the community	
Alan Beval Castle	For service to the community and veterans	
Mary Fairbairn Childe	For service to music as a concert pianist, teacher and examiner	
Elvis Yiufai Chow	For service to the Chinese Chamber of Commerce	
Gladys Evelyn Christian	For service to the community and youth	
David William Clark	For service to the building and construction industry and to the Stanwell Skills Development Project	
John Henry Collinson	For service to the sport of rifle shooting	
Jason Stuart Cooper	For service to sport as gold medalist at the Paralympic Games, Madrid 1992	
Priya Naree Cooper	For service to sport as a gold medalist at the Paralympic Games, Barcelona 1992	
Ivy Shirley Coulson	For service to the community, particularly through the St John Ambulance 'Save a Life' programme	
Tracey Nicole Cross	For service to sport as a gold medalist at the Paralympic Games, Barcelona 1992	
Anne Nicole Currie	For service to sport as a gold medalist at the Paralympic Games, Barcelona 1992	
Winifred Hilda Danby	For service to the community through social welfare services and organisations for senior citizens	
Colin Frederick Davies	For service to the law and to the community	
Cedric Davies	For service to local government and to the community	
Robert Edwin Day	For service to the community	
Gladys Edith Delaney	For service to sport as a gold medalist at the Paralympic Games, Madrid 1992	
Harrie William Dening	For service to the sport of soccer	
Maurice Lindsay Denson	For service to the community and to scouting	
Clare Devlin	For service to the community through the 'Friends at Court' support group	
Leonard Mervyn Diprose	For service to aviation	
George Boi Ditchmen	For service to aviation engineering	
Pamella Phyllis Dock	For service to community nursing through the care and support of mothers and babies	
William Matthew Dougherty	For service to the community and the aged	
Wendy Fay Driver	For service to the community, particularly to children with hearing impairments and other disabilities	
Gordon George Drummond	For service to the community, particularly through the NSW Animal Welfare League	
Squadron Leader Walter Alexander Eacott	For service to the community and to retirees	
Neil Oldham Easton	For service to the performing arts as an opera singer and teacher	
Dr Thomas Wynn Edwards	For service to veterinary science and to the RSPCA WA	
Myra Eunice Farley	For service to philately, particularly through the Royal Philatelic Society of Victoria	
Sergeant Leslie Alfred Fawkes	For service to the community	
Karl Peter Thomas Feifar	For service to sport as a gold medalist at the Paralympic Games, Barcelona 1992	
Francis John Fenwick	For service to amateur swimming associations	
Mavis Jean Filmer	For service to charitable organisations	
Anton James Flavel	For service to sport as a gold medalist at the Paralympic Games, Madrid 1992	
Iris Merle Forsyth	For service to the arts as a pianist, teacher and examiner and to the community through fundraising for charitable organisations	
Ian Munro Fraser	For service to youth, particularly through the Naval Reserve Cadets	
Dr Peter Allen Fricker	For service to sports medicine	
Neil Robert Fuller	For service to sport as a gold medalist at the Paralympic Games, Barcelona 1992	
Melissa Jane Gallagher	For service to aport as a gold medalist at the Paralympic Games, Madrid 1992	
Daryl George Gallagher	For service to the sport of skiing	
Maxwell Noel Gamlin	For service to the community	
Michele Gangemi	For service to the Italian community	
Geoffrey Leo Gard, BEM	For service to the community, particularly through the Sportsman's Association of Australia (Tas) and the Royal Australian Corps of Signals (Tas)	
Maida Winnifred Gardner	For service to scouting and to women	
Pete Mcpherson Garnsey	For service to the community	
Frances Thelma Gavel	For service to the community, particularly through the United Hospital Auxiliaries of NSW	
Margaret Valma Joyce Gebhart	For service to the sport of netball and to the community	
Margaret Beryl Gill	For service to English teaching and to education	
Dr Wojciech Gorski	For service to the Polish community	
Ernest Norman Graham, BEM	For service to the community and to veterans	
Peter John Graham	For service to local government, the Presbyterian Church and to the community	
Edward John Stephen Grant	For service to the community	
Eric Vincent Gray	For service to secondary school education and to the community	
Barbara Elizabeth Grealy	For service to women, particularly through the Catholic Women's League (SA), Australian Church Women and the World Union of Catholic Women's Organisation	
Ronald Ninian Grieve	For service to primary industry, particularly as a breeder of Angus cattle and to the community	
Freda Madge Griffin	For service to people with disabilities, particularly through Better Hearing Australia (WA)	
John Arthur Griffin	For service to tourism	
Lieutenant Colonel Jerzy Gruszka,(ret'd)	For service to the Polish community	
Dixie Christina Gunning	For service to the Guide Dogs for the Blind committee, WA	
Margaret Gutman	For service to the Jewish community, particularly through the NSW Jewish Board of Deputies	
Josephine Elspeth Hall	For service to children as director of the University Pre-School and Childcare Centre, ANU	
Joan Margaret Halliday	For service to classical dance education	
Monica Marie Halliday	For service to classical dance education	
Valrene Joy Hampton	For service to children, particularly through the support of an orphan scheme	
Rene Hardenbol	For service to sport as a gold medallist at the Paralympic Games, Madrid 1992	
Dorothy Elizabeth Harrington	For service to people with intellectual disabilities	
Helen Ruth Harris	For service to community history	
Daphne Heather Hass	For service to softball	
Kevin James Haycock	For service to scouting	
Robert Lewis Hayes	For service to Technical and Further Education and to education administration	
Kenneth George Hazelwood	For service to veterans	
Sister Marie Therese Hedigan	For service to hospital administration and to Hospice Home Care Services	
Trevor Ross Heitmann	For service to the State Emergency Service (SA)	
Daryl John Hicks	For service to Australian Rules football and to the community	
Fiona Ann Hinds	For service to sport as a gold medallist at the Paralympic Games Madrid 1992	
Joshua Powell Hofer	For service to sport as a gold medallist at the Paralympic Games, Madrid 1992	
Violet Pozieres Holland	For service to women and to the aged	
Alwyn Edward Holmes	For service to community health particularly through the Hunter Valley Cancer Appeal	
Lorraine Holmes	For service to the visual arts in the Illawarra Region	
Catherine Lucette Huggett	For service to sport as a gold medalist at the Paralympic Games, Barcelona 1992	
Christine Ann Humphries	For service to sport as a gold medallist at the Paralympic Games, Madrid 1992	
Alderman Alan Aizley Hyam	For service to local government and to the community	
Alick Jackomos	For service to the Aboriginal Advancement League (VIC) and to researching and recording Aboriginal family genealogies	
Katherine Anne Mackay Jacobs	For service to the Australian Red Cross Society	
Lembit (Jess) Jarver	For service to athletics as a coach, administrator, commentator and writer	
Melville Cora Jeisman	For service to nursing	
William Cyril Jewell	For service to the Mount Royal Hospital	
Graham Douglas Johnson	For service to the community and to youth	
George Eric Johnson	For service to tennis administration	
Brother Michael Johnson	For service to education	
The Reverend Bernard George Judd, MBE	For service to the community, particularly through the Council of Churches, NSW	
Sofija Kanas	For service to multicultural organisations and to women's health issues	
Annette Priscilla Kelly	For service to sport as a gold medallist at the Paralympic Games, Madrid 1992	
Bettina Faye Kenna	For service to sport as a gold medallist at the Paralympic Games, Madrid 1992	
John Kennedy	For service to the community	
Margaret Lorraine Kenny	For service to the Mercy Hospital for Women, East Melbourne Auxiliary	
Gwenda Emily Kitto	For service to the Girl Guides Association of South Australia	
Kenneth Keese Lambert	For service to the taxi industry	
Jeannie Irene Lane	For service to the United Hospital Auxiliaries, Coledale Branch	
Malva Langford	For service to veterans particularly through the Australian Army Medical Women's Service Association	
Ruth Margaret Lee	For service to the community and to the Freedom From Hunger Campaign	
Marianne Lewinsky	For service to the aged	
Wilfred Felix Lewton	For service to amateur angling as an administrator	
John Lindsay	For service to sport as a gold medallist at the Paralympic Games, Barcelona 1992	
Peter Edward Liu	For service to the Chinese community and to business and commerce	
David Thomas Lowe	For service to disadvantaged youth through Drug Arm, Toowoomba and to music education	
Dorham Mann	For service to the winemaking industry	
Kenneth Marland	For service to the community and to youth	
Donald Lawrence Mathieson	For service to Australian Rules football	
Jack Roy Matthews	For service to the community and to local government	
Don Barry Matts	For service to speleology and to the Cave Rescue Group of the Volunteer Rescue Association NSW	
Ernst Henry Matuschka	For service to the community and to veterans	
Mandy Nicole Maywood	For service to sport as a gold medallist at the Paralympic Games, Barcelona 1992	
Wallace Robert Armour McAlpine	For service to the community, particularly through the Uniting Church and to Rotary	
Philip James McCallum	For service to the community	
Brian James McGuire	For service to primary school sports administration and to the community	
Amy Ann Merle McKay	For service to the community and to disadvantaged children	
John Joseph McLaughlin	For service to sport and to the community	
Brian Frederick McNicholl	For service to sport as a gold medallist at the Paralympic Games, Barcelona 1992	
Harry James McPhee	For service to the community as custodian of the Norman Lindsay Gallery and Museum	
Isabella Nance McPherson	For service to the Essendon and District Memorial Hospital Auxiliary and to the community	
Reverend Francis Augustine Mecham	For service to the community and to religion	
Charles Victor Miller	For service to veterans and to the aged	
Bruce Colin Milne	For service to farming and land care management	
Michael John Milton	For service to sport as a gold medallist at the Paralympic Games, Albertville 1992	
Dorothy Loring Mitchell	For service to people with disabilities through the Art Society for the Handicapped	
Harry Frank Moore	For service to the community	
Maurice Edwin Morgan	For service to people with disabilities	
Freda Mott, BEM	For service to the United Hospital Auxiliaries, Armidale branch	
Raymond William Motteram	For service to the Field and Game Federation of Australia	
Zena Joy Mulhall	For service to veterans, particularly through the Atherton Returned and Services League Auxiliary	
Djon Scott Mundine	For service to the promotion and development of Aboriginal arts, crafts and culture	
Klavdia Nikolaevna Mutsenko-Yakounin	For service to the Russian community	
Maxwell Edwin Nancarrow	For service to community health as national president of the Australian Cardiacs Association	
Rodney Francis Nugent	For service to sport as a gold medallist at the Paralympic Games, Barcelona, 1992	
Harry Wilfred Nunn	For public service as an archivist and for service to archival profession and to record management	
Patrick Edward Paul O'Brien	For service to athletics	
Audrey Brenda O'Byrne	For service to the aged	
Kevin Francis O'Neill	For service to local government and to the community	
Terence Joseph O'Shane	For service to Aboriginal people, particularly in the areas of equity, social justice and land rights	
Margaret Oats	For service to the disadvantaged in the community, particularly as foundation chairperson, Share Care, Collingwood	
Marjory Agnes Oddie	For service to local government	
Shirley Iles Orpin	For service to scouting	
Dr Raymond Charles Owen	For service to dentistry	
Mary Pandilo	For service to the Aboriginal community	
Zelda Cecille Pearlman	For service to the Jewish community	
Alice Maud Penman	For service to veterans, particularly through the Returned and Services League NSW and to the Friends of the Northcott Neurological Centre	
Lance Joseph Pereira	For service to the blind and visually impaired, particularly those suffering from retinitis pigmentosa	
Warren George Perkins	For service to the community, particularly through the Cape Hawke Community Hospital Association	
Martin George Henry Pitt	For service to industrial relations, particularly through the Electrical Trades Union	
Colin Francis Platt	For service to scouting	
James Matthew Price, MBE	For service to local government and to primary industry	
James Sydney Bryant (Rex) Prior	For service to the community	
Marguerite Barbara Pritchard	For service to the Girl Guides Association	
Alison Clare Quinn	For service to sport as a gold medallist at the Paralympic Games, Barcelona 1992	
Dr Noel McHugh Ramsey	For service to family medicine	
John Alexander Rawes	For service to St John Ambulance SA and to accountancy	
John William Rawlinson	For service to the building industry, particularly as a quantity surveyor	
Stanley James Lawler Ray	For service to Australian Rules football	
Maurice Thomas Reddan	For service to rowing	
Dr Charles Rowland Bromley Richards, MBE ED	For service to sports medicine and to The Sun-Herald City to Surf Fun Run	
Claude Gordon George Robertson	For service to local government and to motorcycling	
Alan Charles Robertson	For service to local government and to engineering	
D'arcy Daniel Robinson	For service to veterans and to the aged	
Don Grant Rodgers	For services to surf-lifesaving	
William John Ronald	For service to the Australian Fencing Federation	
John James Frederick Roper	For service to traditional church bellringing, particularly through St Paul's Cathedral, Melbourne	
Murdoch John Ross	For service to local government and to the community	
Domenica Maria Immacolata Rossi	For service to women and to the Italian community, particularly through the Reservoir Italian Women's Group	
Phillip Rothman, BEM	For service to swimming, particularly through the Learn to Swim Campaign NSW	
Carl Middleton Routley	For service to veterans, particularly through the Rats of Tobruk Association	
Evangelene Salakas	For service to charitable organisations	
Alix Louise Sauvage	For service to sport as a gold medallist at the Paralympic Games, Barcelona 1992	
Geoff Shaw	For service to Aboriginal people through the NT Town Camps Movement and as general manager of the Tangentyere Council	
Margaret (Peggy) Shearing	For service to swimming	
Kennerly Collingwood Sheel	For service to tennis as an administrator	
Russell Luke Short	For service to sport as a gold medallist at the Paralympic Games, Barcelona 1992	
Sister Heather Jane (Jenny) Short	For service to nursing, particularly through the Orthopaedic Training Laboratory, St George Hospital	
Pastor Jean Gardeniar Sizer	For service to the Uniting Church and to the community	
Patricia May Smeeton, OBE	For service to the community and to the Anglican Mothers Union (Perth)	
Reverend Edward James Smith	For service to people with disabilities, particularly through the Crossroads Christian Fellowship	
Norman Clarence Smith	For service to veterans, particularly through the Returned and Services League NSW	
Russell Hugh Smith	For service to the performing arts as a singer and teacher of opera	
Donna Maree Smith	For service to sport as a gold medallist at the Paralympic Games, Barcelona 1992	
Sister Edith Olive Smith	For service to people with disabilities and to nursing, particularly through the Crossroads Christian Fellowship and the Blue Nursing Service	
Jessie Agnes Spark	For service to nursing and to the community, particularly through the Geelong Hospice Care Association	
Sol Spitalnic	For service to amateur boxing as a administrator	
Kenneth Henry Springbett	For service to Meals on Wheels	
Winifred Rose (Dot) Springbett	For service to Meals on Wheels	
Leonard John Stevens	For service to the community	
Harold Maitland Stevens	For service to athletics	
Professor Daniel Desmond Stewart	For service to education	
Anthony Frank Stokes	For service to veterans	
Phillip Wall Thompson	For service to the Georges River National Park Trust	
Darren Brian Thrupp	For service to sport as a gold medalist at the Paralympic Games, Barcelona 1992	
Henryk Tomaszewski	For service to the Polish community	
Alice May Toogood	For service to sport as a gold medallist at the Paralympic Games, Madrid 1992	
Norma Muriel Topp	For service to the community, particularly as national director of Tall Fashion Promotions of Australia	
Nancy Tranby	For service to the community, particularly through St John Ambulance, Australia	
Mannix Philip Tulley	For service to the community, particularly through the Bayswater Elderly Citizens Help Organisation	
Eileen Margaret Turner	For service to the Tasmanian Pensioners Union, Hobart and Glenorchy branches	
Kevin Douglas Umback	For service to local history, particularly the restoration and maintenance of Bega Valley cemeteries	
Katherine Patricia Ursich	For service to the community	
Ronald Trevor Vayro	For service to the development of the sport of blind cricket for visually impaired players	
Peter William Waldron	For service to farming and land care management	
Joseph William Walker	For service to sport as a gold medallist at the Paralympic Games, Madrid 1992	
Richard Barry Walley	For service to the performing arts and to the promotion of the culture of the South Western Aboriginals, the Nyoongahs	
Bruce Wallrodt	For service to sport as a gold medallist at the Paralympic Games, Barcelona 1992	
Graham Anthony Walsh	For service to the community	
Gordon Warby	For service to people with intellectual disabilities, particularly through the Maitland Branch of the Challenge Foundation	
Nola Margaret Warby	For service to people with intellectual disabilities, particularly through the Maitland Branch of the Challenge Foundation	
Lilian Gladys Waugh	For service to netball	
Gwennyth Imrie Webb	For service to the arts as director of the Sale Regional Art Gallery	
Arthur James Webster	For service to primary industry	
Raymond Wallace Whiteside	For service to the community, particularly as chairman of the Geelong and District Water Board	
Margaret Jule Wilkie	For service to the community	
Dr Sara Williams	For service to medicine, particularly in the field of child psychiatry	
Jodi Glenda Willis	For service to sport as a gold medallist at the Paralympic Games, Barcelona 1992	
John Willis	For service to aviation	
Lancelot Ghwelf Clarence Woodhouse	For service to the community, particularly through the Shepparton International Village	
Sandra Yaxley	For service to sport as a gold medallist at the Paralympic Games, Barcelona 1992	
Reverend Nicholas Zervas	For service to the Greek community	

==== Military division ====
Branch	Recipient	Citation	Notes
Navy	Warrant Officer Monica Jolanda Cullen	For service to the Royal Australian Navy in the field of food catering	
Navy	Chief Petty Officer Kenneth Bruce Greenwood	For exemplary service to the Royal Australian Navy, particularly in the field of submarine electrical engineering	
Navy	Warrant Officer Kym Gregory Lees	For exceptional service to the Royal Australian Navy, particularly in the field of personnel support and facilities maintenance	
Navy	Warrant Officer Geoffrey Charles Stokes	For exceptional commitment and outstanding contribution to sport in the Australian Defence Force (RAN)	
Army	Warrant Officer Class One Leslie John Allt	For service to the Australian Defence Force in the field of aircraft logistics (Australian Army)	
Army	Warrant Officer Class One Anthony Drummond	For service to the Army as RSM 1 command regiment	
Army	Warrant Officer Class One Graham Charles Dyer	For service to the Australian Army as the RSM of 6 Battalion, the Royal Australian Regiment	
Army	Warrant Officer Class One Jeffrey Roy Jackson	For exceptional service to the Army as the Military Police School Regimental Sergeant Major	
Army	Warrant Officer Class Two Leonard Sydney Mannion	For exceptional service to the Army Reserve, in particular the 2/14 Light Horse Regiment	
Army	Warrant Officer Class One Barry John Martin	For exceptional service to the Army as the Regimental Sergeant Major of the Australian Contingent, United Nations Transitional Authority in Cambodia	
Army	Staff Sergeant Jennifer Roslyn Saward	For exceptional service to the Army Reserve as Chief Clerk of 66 Military Police Platoon	
Army	Warrant Officer Class Two Suzanne Maree Shannon	For service to the Australian Defence Force in developing logistics support for the Defence Centre, Melbourne	
Army	Warrant Officer Class One Brian William Wruck	For exceptional service to the Army as the Regimental Sergeant Major of the Royal Queensland Regiment	
Air Force	Warrant Officer John Raymond Binney	For service to the Royal Australian Air Force as caterer, Base Squadron, Wagga Wagga	
Air Force	Sergeant Michael Bolger	For service to the Royal Australian Air Force as Senior NCO, Administration, Facilities Flight, Base Squadron East Sale	
Air Force	Flight Sergeant Christopher John Dolanhenty	For service to the Royal Australian Air Force in the development of the Airmen Education Training Scheme	
