= 1993 Australian Swimming Championships =

The 1993 Australian Swimming Championships were held at the Claremont Superdrome in Perth, Western Australia from 24 to 28 March. They doubled as the national trials for the 1993 Pan Pacific Swimming Championships. They were organised by Australian Swimming.

== Medal winners ==
=== Men's events ===
Event	Gold		Silver		Bronze	
50 m freestyle						
50 m EAD freestyle	Joseph Walker (NSW)	28.13	Joshua Hofer (WA)	28.67	Brendan Burkett (Qld)	29:63
100 m freestyle	Chris Fydler (NSW)	50.44	Andrew Baildon (Qld)	50.98	Dwade Sheehan (Qld)	51.06
200 m freestyle	Matthew Dunn (NSW)	1:51.25	Kieren Perkins (Qld)	1:51.51	Malcolm Allen (NSW)	1:51.69
400 m freestyle	Kieren Perkins (Qld)	3:52.72	Glen Housman (Qld)	3:55.80	Daniel Mclellan (nsw	3:58.65
800 m freestyle	Kieren Perkins (Qld)	7:56.04	Daniel Kowalski (Qld)	7:59.63	Glen Housman (Qld)	8:05.56
1500 m freestyle						
50 m backstroke	Alexander Popov; Russia	26.29	Malcolm Allen (Qld); Thomas Stachewicz (WA)	26.96	None awarded	
50 m EAD backstroke	Joseph Walker (NSW)	35.69	Joshua Hofer (WA)	37.49	David Smith (WA)	43.70
100 m backstroke	Simon Beqir (Vic)	57.65	Thomas Stachewicz (WA)	58.05	Toby Haenen (Vic)	58.24
200 m backstroke	Scott Miller (NSW)	2:01.12	Malcolm Allen (Qld)	2:03.48	Simon Beqir (Vic)	2:04.76
50 m breaststroke	Phil Rogers (SA)	29.04	Shane Lewis (Qld)	29.65	Nic Baker (NSW)	29.91
50 m EAD breaststroke	Joseph Walker (NSW)	39.16	Joshua Hofer (WA)	39.68	Paul Gockel (Qld)	45.81
100 m breaststroke	Phil Rogers (SA)	1:02.47	Shane Lewis (Qld)	1:03.29	Matthew Wright (Qld)	1:04.57
200 m breaststroke						
50 m butterfly	Jason Cooper (Qld)	25.09	Alexander Popov; Russia	25.45	Roger Smith (NSW)	25.47
50 m EAD butterfly	Joseph Walker (NSW)	29.58	Jason Diederich (WA)	29.74	Joshua Hofer (WA)	31.86
100 m butterfly	Bill Kirby (WA); Adam Pine (NSW)	55.58	None awarded		Andrew Baildon (Qld)	55.69
200 m butterfly	Scott Miller (NSW)	1:57.97	Scott Goodman (Tas)	2:00.75	Bill Kirby (WA)	2:02.78
200 m individual medley						
400 m individual medley	Matthew Dunn (NSW)	4:17.84; AR	Hamish Cameron (Vic)	4:26.82	Scott Bartlett (Qld)	4:31.86
4 × 100 m freestyle relay						
4 × 200 m freestyle relay						
4 × 100 m medley relay						

Legend: WR – World record; CR – Commonwealth record; OR – Oceanian record; AR – Australian record; ACR – Australian All Comers record; Club – Australian Club record

=== Women's events ===
Event	Gold		Silver		Bronze	
50 m freestyle						
50 m EAD freestyle	Priya Cooper (WA)	35.35	Tracey Cross (WA)	35.06	Judy Young (NSW)	31.18
100 m freestyle	Susie O'Neill (Qld)	56.51	Sarah Ryan (SA)	57.60	Sally-Anne Sullivan (NSW)	57:61
200 m freestyle	Susie O'Neill (Qld)	2:00.09	Anna Windsor (NSW)	2:03.68	Toni Greaves (NSW)	2:04.00
400 m freestyle	Hayley Lewis (Qld)	4:12.48	Stacey Gartrell (NSW)	4:15.38	Chloe Flutter (NSW)	4:16.10
800 m freestyle						
1500 m freestyle	Hayley Lewis (Qld)	16:25.04	Stacey Gartrell (NSW)	16:26.26	Keryn McGinley (Qld)	16:50.59
50 m backstroke	Johanna Griggs (Qld)	29.95	Nicole Stevenson (Vic)	30.05	Joanne Meehan (Qld)	30.65
50 m EAD backstroke	Tracey Cross (WA)	40.72	Priya Cooper (WA)	41.37	Judy Young (NSW)	36.76
100 m backstroke	Nicole Stevenson (Vic)	1:03.27	Leigh Habler (Qld)	1:03.67	Joanne Meehan (Qld)	1:03.93
200 m backstroke	Nicole Stevenson (Vic)	2:12.55	Leigh Habler (Qld)	2:13.93	Meredith Smith (NSW)	2:14.17
50 m breaststroke	Rebecca Brown (Qld)	32.90	Samantha Riley (Qld)	33.19	Debby Wade (NSW)	33.85
50 m EAD breaststroke	Judy Young (NSW)	42.21	Kelly Barnes (Vic)	44.40	Sarah-Jane Schulze (NSW)	46:48
100 m breaststroke	Samantha Riley (Qld)	1:08.99	Rebecca Brown (Qld)	1:10.31	Debby Wade (NSW)	1:11.96
200 m breaststroke						
50 m butterfly	Angela Kennedy (NSW)	27.94	Susie O'Neill (Qld)	28.21	Petria Thomas (NSW)	28.26
50 m EAD butterfly	Tracy Barrell (NSW)	1:13.74	Priya Cooper (WA)	41.94	Judy Young (NSW)	33.87
100 m butterfly	Susie O'Neill (Qld)	1:00.01	Petria Thomas (NSW)	1:01.12	Angela Kennedy (NSW)	1:02.09
200 m butterfly	Susie O'Neill (Qld)	2:10.35	Hayley Lewis (Qld)	2:15.05	Amanda Hector (NSW)	2:15.19
200 m individual medley						
400 m individual medley	Elli Overton (NSW)	4:46.94	Hayley Lewis (Qld)	4:47.97	Julie Majer (Qld)	4:51.40
4 × 100 m freestyle relay						
4 × 200 m freestyle relay						
4 × 100 m medley relay						

Legend: WR – World record; CR – Commonwealth record; OR – Oceanian record; AR – Australian record; ACR – Australian All Comers record; Club – Australian Club record

== See also ==
- 1992 in swimming
- 1992 Australian Swimming Championships
