= Endeavour recycled clothing =

Endeavour Recycled Clothing
- Type: Private/Thrift store
- Industry: Retail
- Headquarters: Queensland and New South Wales
- Products: Second-hand goods
- Website: http://www.endeavour.com.au/page/shop/recycled-clothing/

The Endeavour Recycled Clothing Thrift Store (trading as ERC) is a chain of thrift stores in Australia and is operated by the Endeavour Foundation. There are currently 26 stores in Queensland and New South Wales. The proceeds from the stores sales go towards supporting the work of the Endeavour Foundation.
