= Shane Lewis =

Shane Lewis may refer to:

- Shane Lewis (swimmer) (1973–2021), Australian swimmer
- Shane Lewis (racing driver) (born 1967), American racing driver
- Shayne Lewis, fictional character
