= Racquel Nugent =

Australian athlete

Medal record
Athletics
Paralympic Games for Persons with Mental Handicap
Bronze medal – third place	1992 Madrid	Women's Long Jump
IPC Athletics World Championships
Gold medal – first place	1994 Berlin	Women's Long Jump T20
Bronze medal – third place	1994 Berlin	Women's 200 m T20

Racquel Nugent (born 1968) from Gladstone, Queensland is an Australian athlete with an intellectual disability. At the 1992 Paralympic Games for Persons with Mental Handicap, she won a bronze medal.

== Career ==
Competing at the 1st World Games for Athletes with an Intellectual Disability in Härnösand, Sweden, she won two gold medals in the Women's 100 m and Women 4 × 100 m Relay and two silver medals in the Women's 200 m and Women's Long Jump. At the 1992 Paralympic Games for Persons with Mental Handicap in Madrid, Spain, she won a bronze medal in the Women's Long Jump At the 1994 IPC Athletics World Championships in Berlin, Germany, she won a gold medal in the Women's Long Jump T20 and a bronze medal in the Women's 200 m T20.

In 2010, she was recognized for her 25 years employment with Endeavour Foundation Industries in Gladstone.

By July 2019, Nugent had worked at the Endeavour Foundation in Gladstone for 34 years. She worked in the document destruction plant.

== Community Involvement ==
Nugent's community involvement included volunteering for the Tannum Sands Seagulls Football Club. She helped in the canteen, refereed, and managed the women's team.

In 2019, Nugent was the third Gladstone resident selected to take part in the Great Endeavour Rally, in its 34-year history. This Queensland 3700 km motoring event raises money for charity while increasing awareness of disability. Nugent traveled to Bundaberg to join the team which stayed overnight in Theodore, Jericho, Kynuna, the Burke and Wills Roadhouse, Karumba, Einasleigh, Cardwell, and Townsville.
