= Norma Koplick =

Australian Paralympic athlete

Personal information
- Nationality: Australia
- Born: 6 September 1973 (age 52) Brisbane
Medal record
Athletics
Paralympic Games
Silver medal – second place	2000 Sydney	women's javelin throw F20

Norma Koplick (born 6 September 1973) is an Australian Paralympic athlete with an intellectual disability. She won a silver medal at the 2000 Sydney Games in the women's javelin throw F20 event.

Until Grade 3 she attended a mainstream school but then attended John Oxley College, a specialist school. It was at this school she was introduced to sport, particularly athletics and netball.

Her first major international competition was the 1992 Paralympic Games for Persons with Mental Handicap, Madrid, Spain. She competed in the Women's Discus, 100m and Long Jump and did not win a medal. At the 1998 IPC Athletics World Championships, she finished sixth in the Women Shot Put F20. She won a silver medal at the 2000 Summer Paralympics in the Women's Javelin F20 event and finished sixth in the Women's Shot Put F20. She carried 2000 Olympic Torch and lit the Cauldron in Ipswich.
