= Madelyn Ehlers =

Australian Paralympic athlete (1966–2020)

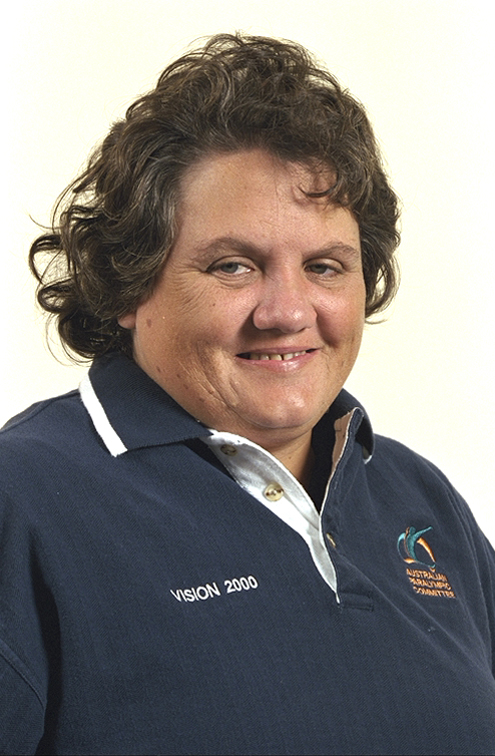
- 2000 Australian Paralympic team portrait of Ehlers

Personal information
- Nationality: Australia
- Born: 17 February 1966 Brisbane, Queensland
- Died: 29 December 2020 (aged 54) Acacia Ridge Queensland Australia
Medal record
Athletics (F20)
Paralympic Games
Silver medal – second place	1992 Madrid	Women's Shot Put
Silver medal – second place	1992 Madrid	Women's Discus

Madelyn Ehlers (17 February 1966 – 29 December 2020) was a Paralympic athletics competitor with an intellectual disability. She won two silver medals at the 1992 Paralympic Games for Persons with Mental Handicap held in Madrid, Spain.

She was born on 17 February 1966) in Brisbane, Queensland. She was born with brain damage and didn't speak until she was six. She became interested in athletics when working at a Red Cross sheltered workshop. The Endeavour Foundation assisted her in her athletics career.

At the 1992 Paralympic Games for Persons with Mental Handicap in Madrid, Spain, she won silver medals in the Women's Shot Put and Women's Discus. She did not compete at the 1996 Atlanta Paralympics due her events not being on the program. Competing at the 1998 IPC Athletics World Championships, she finished fourth in the Women's Shot Put. At the 2000 Sydney Paralympics, she finished sixth in the Women's Javelin F20 and seventh in the Women's Shot Put F20.

After her retirement from athletics, she took up coaching and ten pin bowling. In 2009, she was working at Wesley Mission Work Solutions.

Madelyn died in the same year as her father (2020) after a brief but ravaging battle with cancer.

In 1993, she was awarded the Brisbane Lord Mayor Australia Day Award.
