= Trish Flavel =

Australian Paralympic athlete (born 1976)

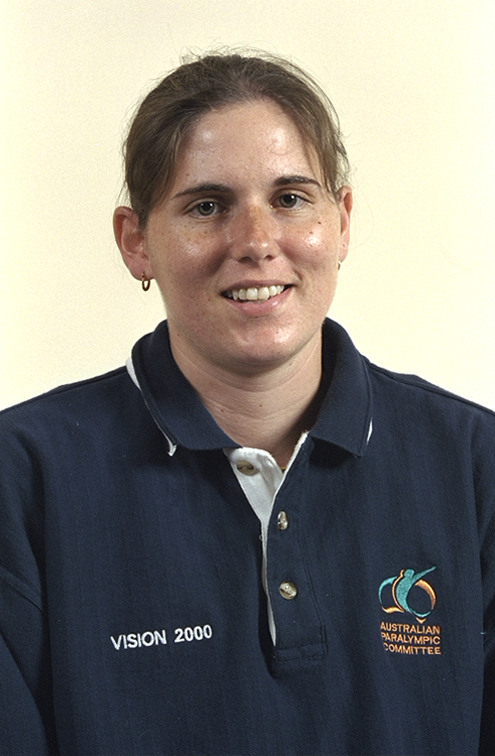
- 2000 Australian Paralympic team portrait of Flavel

Personal information
- Nationality: Australia
- Born: 15 January 1976 (age 50) Box Hill, Victoria
Medal record
Athletics
Paralympic Games
Bronze medal – third place	2000 Sydney	Women's 800 m T20
IPC Athletics World Championships
Gold medal – first place	1998 Birmingham	Women's 3000 M T20
Silver medal – second place	1998 Birmingham	Women's 800 M T20

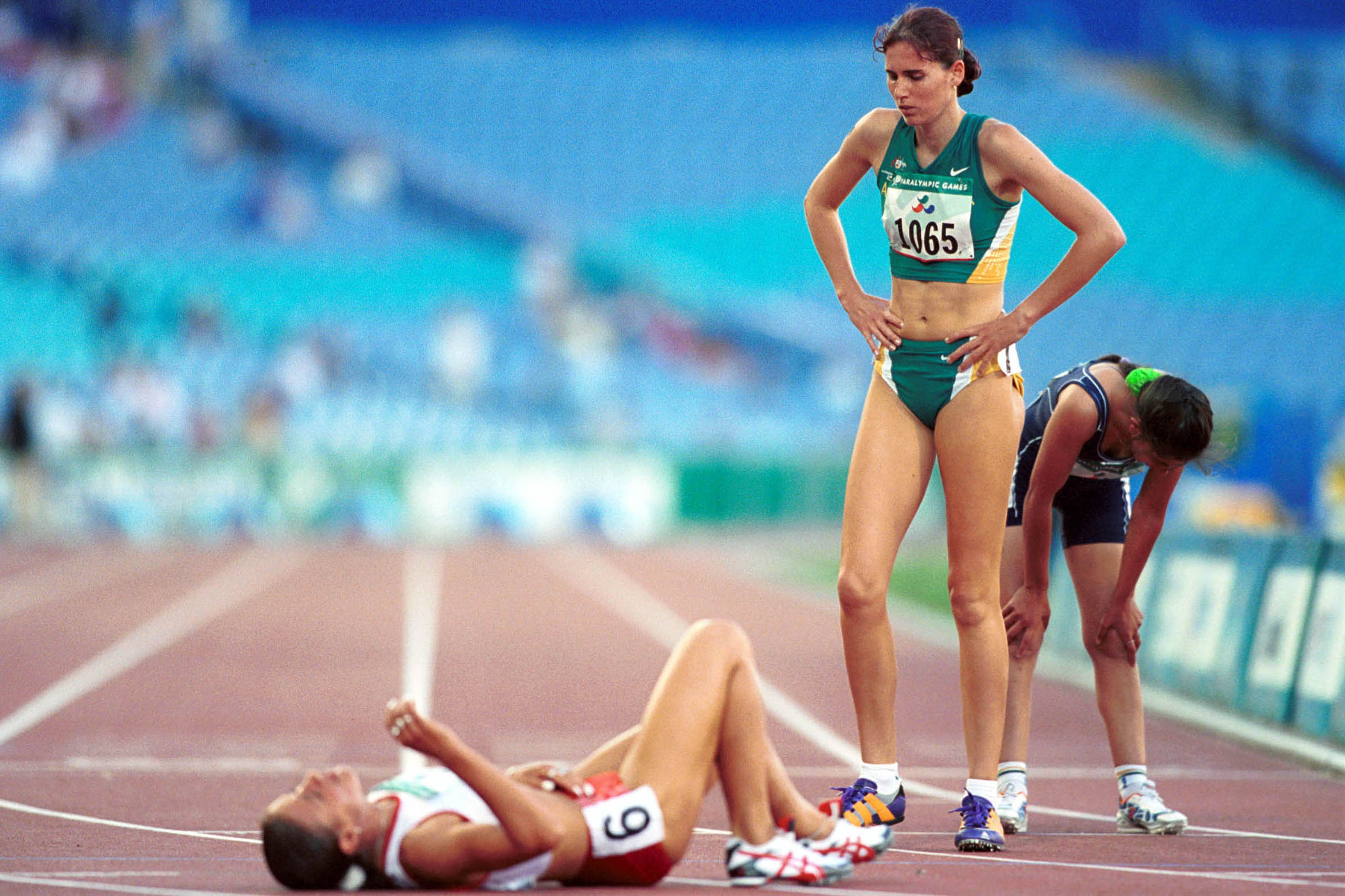
Flavel looks on as other athletes collapse with exhaustion at the finish line, post race 2000 Summer Paralympics

Patricia "Trish" Flavel (née Whittaker) (born 15 January 1976) is an Australian Paralympic athlete with an intellectual disability.

She was born in the Melbourne suburb of Box Hill. She won the Women's U19 1500 m at the 1994 Australian All Schools Championships. At the 2000 Sydney Games, she won a bronze medal in the Women's 800 m T20 athletics event. She was an Australian Institute of Sport Athlete with a Disability scholarship holder from 1999 to 2000.

She is married to Australian Paralympic athlete Anton Flavel.
