= Ron Penny =

Australian immunologist (1936–2019)

Ron Penny AO
- Born: 28 December 1936; Warsaw, Poland
- Died: 21 December 2019 (aged 82); Sydney, Australia
- Education: University of New South Wales; Sydney Medical School
- Medical career
- Field: Immunology
- Institutions: St Vincent's Hospital, Sydney; University of New South Wales
- Research: HIV/AIDS

Ronald Penny (28 December 1936 – 21 December 2019) was an Australian immunologist who made the first diagnosis of HIV/AIDS in Australia in 1982.

== Early life ==
Penny was born in Warsaw, Poland in 1936, and in 1938 his Jewish family settled in Australia as religious refugees.

== Medical career ==
In 1960, Penny graduated with honours from Sydney Medical School, and undertook further study in haematology, oncology and immunology in Britain and the United States. In 1967, he returned to Australia and began work at Sydney's Royal Prince Alfred Hospital, where he set up the first clinical immunology unit in New South Wales. Two years later, the unit was transferred to St Vincent's Hospital.

In October 1982, Penny and his team at St Vincent's made the first diagnosis of HIV/AIDS in Australia, just over a year after the first clinical reporting of the disease in the United States.

In 1983, Penny conducted a survey in New South Wales to better understand the connection between the spread of AIDS, sexual behaviour, and drug usage. He used anonymization methods to protect the respondents from legal jeopardy based on their responses. In addition to identifying sources of primary HIV infection, Penny also worked to address the community and public health aspects of the epidemic, from debunking misconceptions about the transmission of HIV and the resulting discrimination against homosexual men, and adjusting community behaviour to better control transmission such as condom use and safer intravenous drug use.

== Awards and honours ==
In the 1993 Queen's Birthday Honours, Penny was made an Officer of the Order of Australia (AO) for "service to medical research and education particularly in the field of clinical immunology".
