= Joanne Meehan =

Australian swimmer

Personal information
- Born: Joanne Marie Meehan; 25 January 1977 (age 49)
Medal record
Women's swimming
Representing Australia

Joanne Marie Meehan (born 25 January 1977) is an Australian retired swimmer.

== Career ==
Meehan represented Australia at the 1992 Barcelona Olympics in two events. She placed sixth in the final of the women's 100m backstroke, swimming a personal best time of 1min 2.07sec. In the women's 100m medley relay she swam the backstroke leg in the heat. The team qualified for the final, in which Nicole Livingstone took over the backstroke leg.

Meehan finished with third places in the 50m and 100m backstroke events at the 1993 Australian Swimming Championships.
