= Kaye Freeman =

Australian athletics competitor

Medal record
Athletics
Paralympic Games for Persons with Mental Handicap
Bronze medal – third place	1992 Madrid	Women's Javelin

Kaye Freeman from Queensland is an Australian athlete and lawn bowler with an intellectual disability. At the 1992 Paralympic Games for Persons with Mental Handicap, she won a bronze medal.

== Career ==
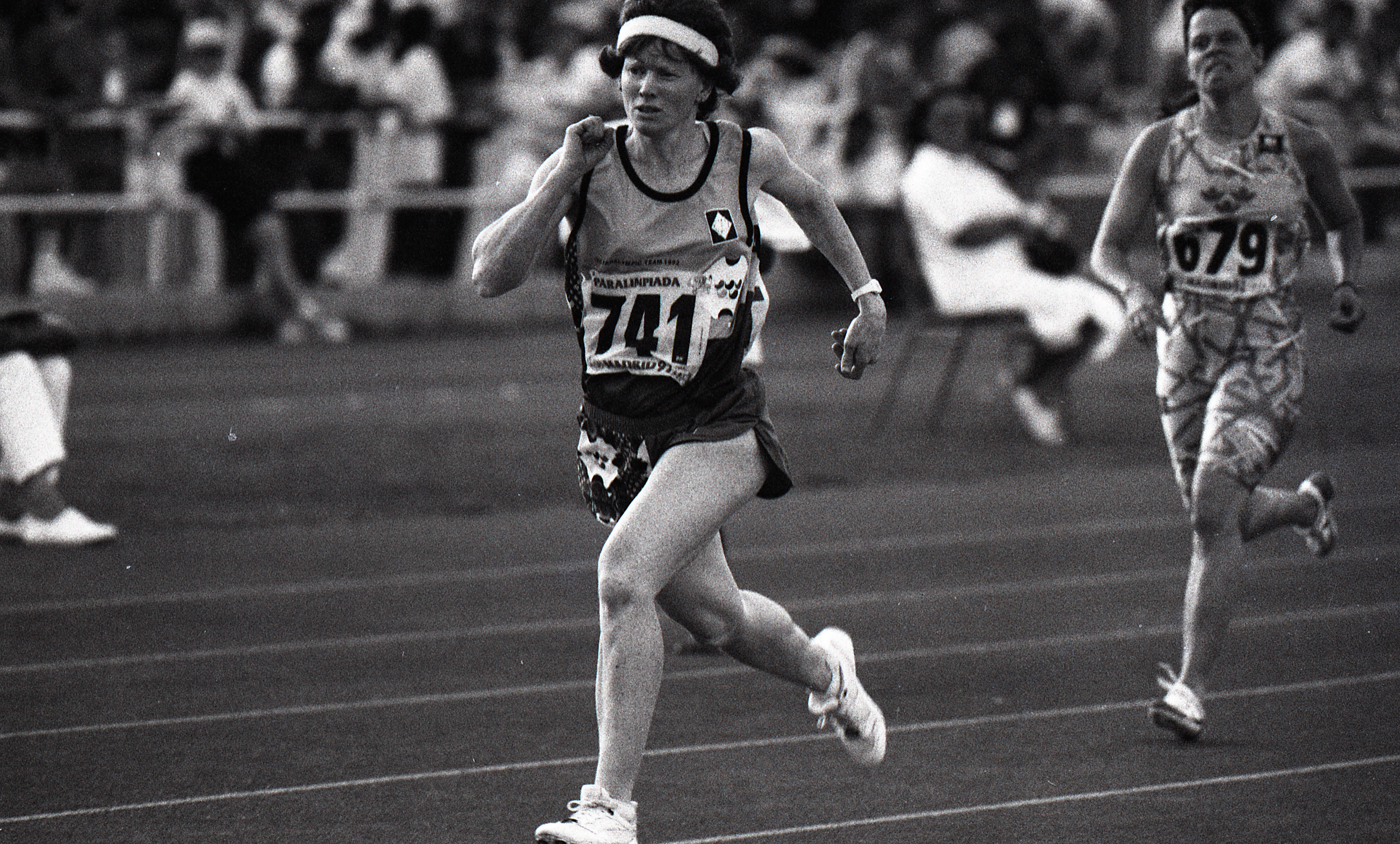
Kaye Freeman competing at the 1992 Paralympic Games for Persons with Mental Handicap in Madrid

At the 1st World Games for Athletes with an Intellectual Disability in Härnösand, Sweden, she won three gold medals in Women's 200 m, Women's Javelin, and Women's 4 × 100 m Relay and a silver medal in the Women's 100 m. At the 1992 Paralympic Games for Persons with Mental Handicap in Madrid, Spain, she won a bronze medal in the Women's Javelin.

After her athletics career, she took up lawn bowls and has been the AUSRAPID Women's Open champion several times.
