= Donna Burns =

Australian basketball player

Donna Burns OAM
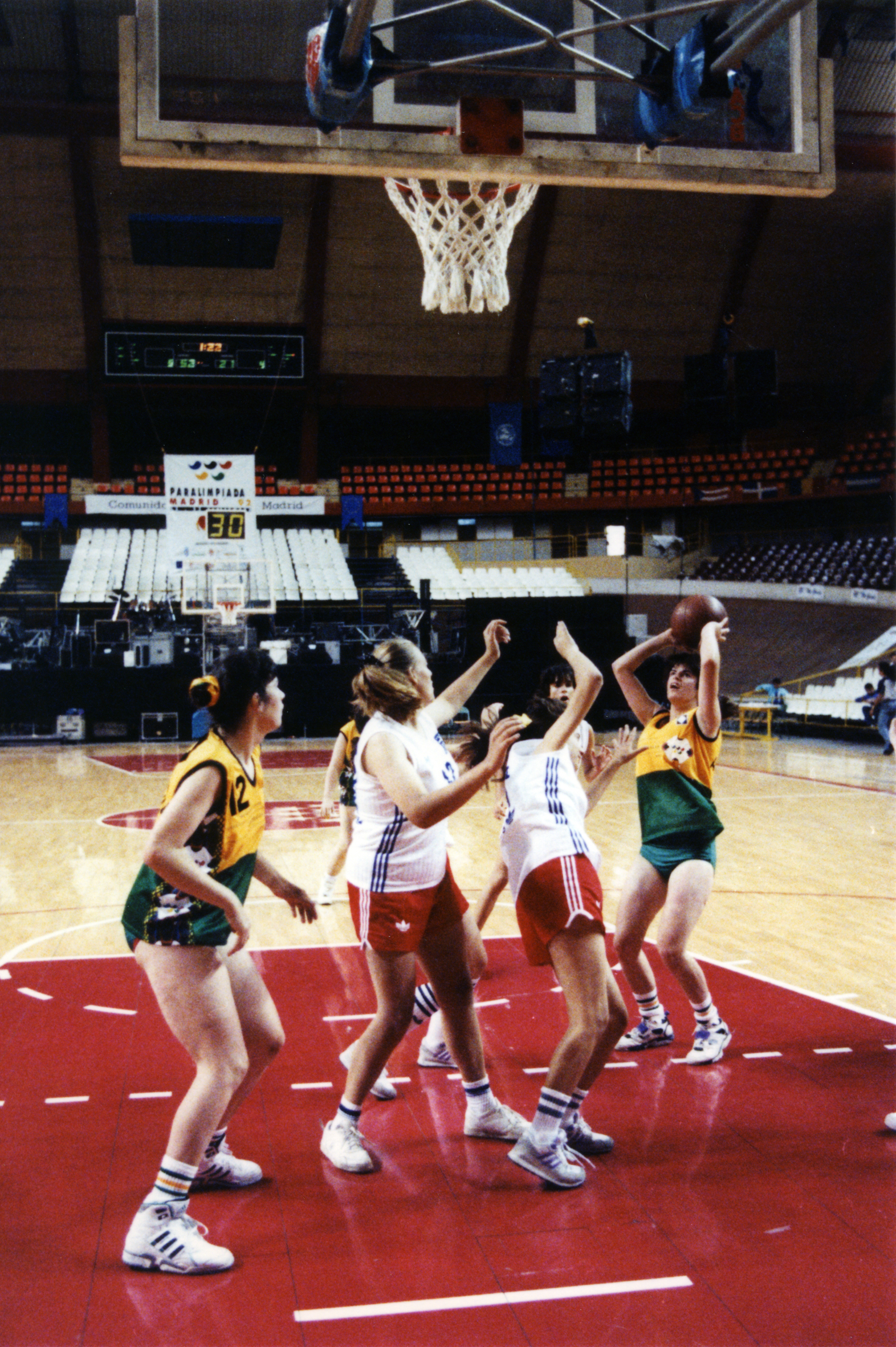
- Annette Kelly (L) watches as Burns shoots at the 1992 Paralympic Games

Personal information
- Full name: Donna Burns
- Nationality: Australia
- Born: Echuca, Victoria
Medal record
Basketball
Paralympic Games for Persons with Mental Handicap
Gold medal – first place	1992 Madrid	Women's basketball

Donna Burns is an Australian basketball player with an intellectual disability who won gold as a member of the Pearls in the 1992 Madrid Paralympic Games for Persons with Mental Handicap. Burns is an Indigenous Australian and descendant of the Yorta Yorta.

== Personal ==
Burns is an Australian basketball player who won gold as a member of the Pearls in the 1992 Madrid Paralympic Games for Persons with Mental Handicap. Born in 1972 in Echuca, Victoria, Australia, Burns is an Indigenous Australian and descendant of the Yorta Yorta. She is the granddaughter of Margaret Tucker, an Indigenous Australian activist and writer.

== Basketball career ==
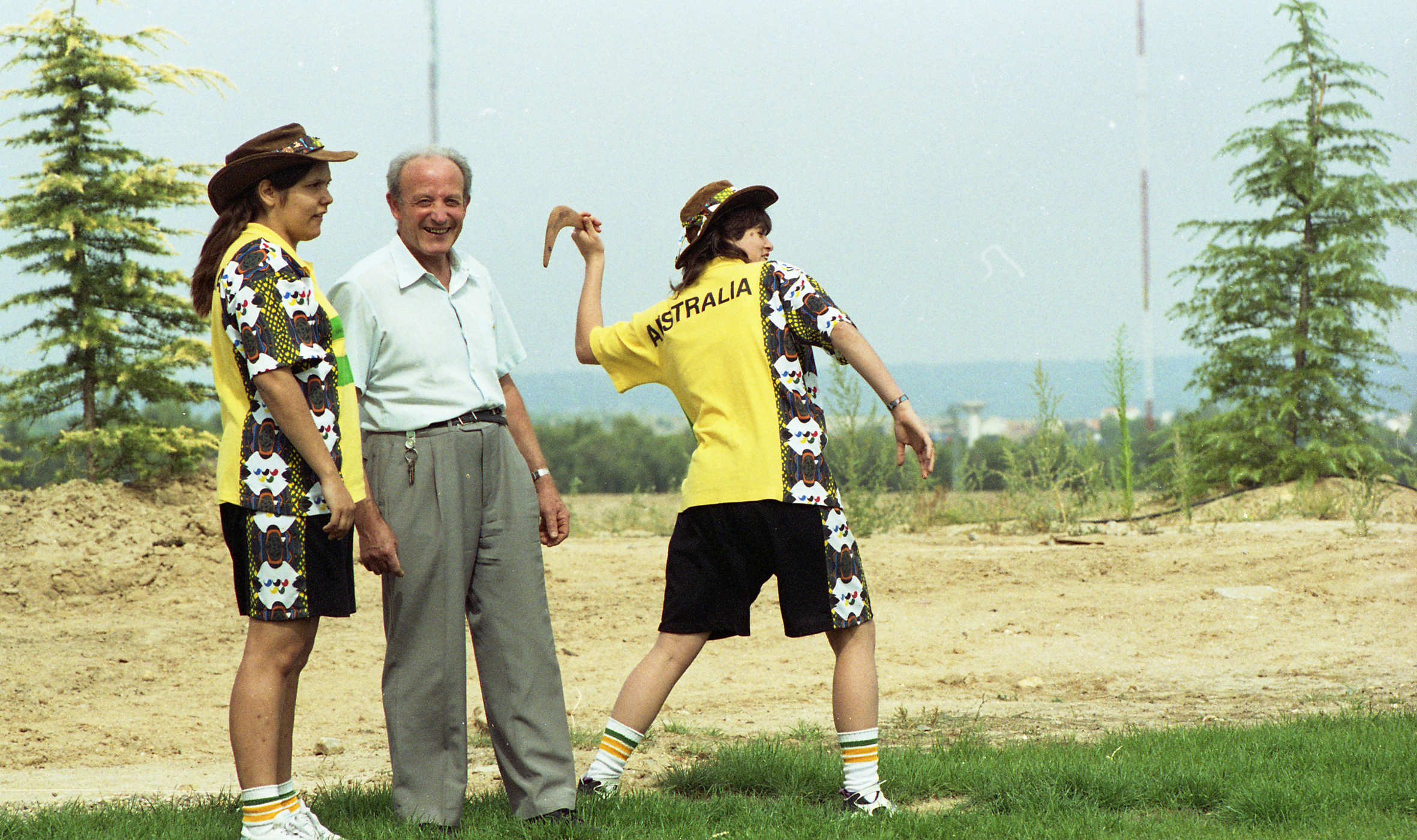
Australian athletes Alice Toogood and Donna Burns throwing the boomerang at the 1992 Madrid Games

Burns alternated from playing netball to basketball from the age of eight. As a teenager she focussed on basketball at the encouragement of her coach, who saw her potential to represent Australia.

Burns was selected as a member of the Pearls, the Australian national women's basketball team for athletes with an intellectual disability. The Pearls were undefeated in Madrid in their five games, against Great Britain, France, Poland and Greece. Burns scored 128 of the team's 273 total points, and was voted Most Valuable Player.

== Recognition ==
- NAIDOC Victorian Sports Person of the Year 1993
- 1993 National Sportswoman of the Year at the 4th biennial National Aboriginal and Torres Strait Islander Sports Awards
- Awarded Medal of the Order of Australia (OAM) on 13 June 1993 in "recognition of service to sport as a gold medalist at the Paralympic Games, Madrid 1992"
- Inducted to Aboriginal and Islander Sports Hall of Fame
