= Paul Mitchell (athlete) =

Australian Paralympic athlete

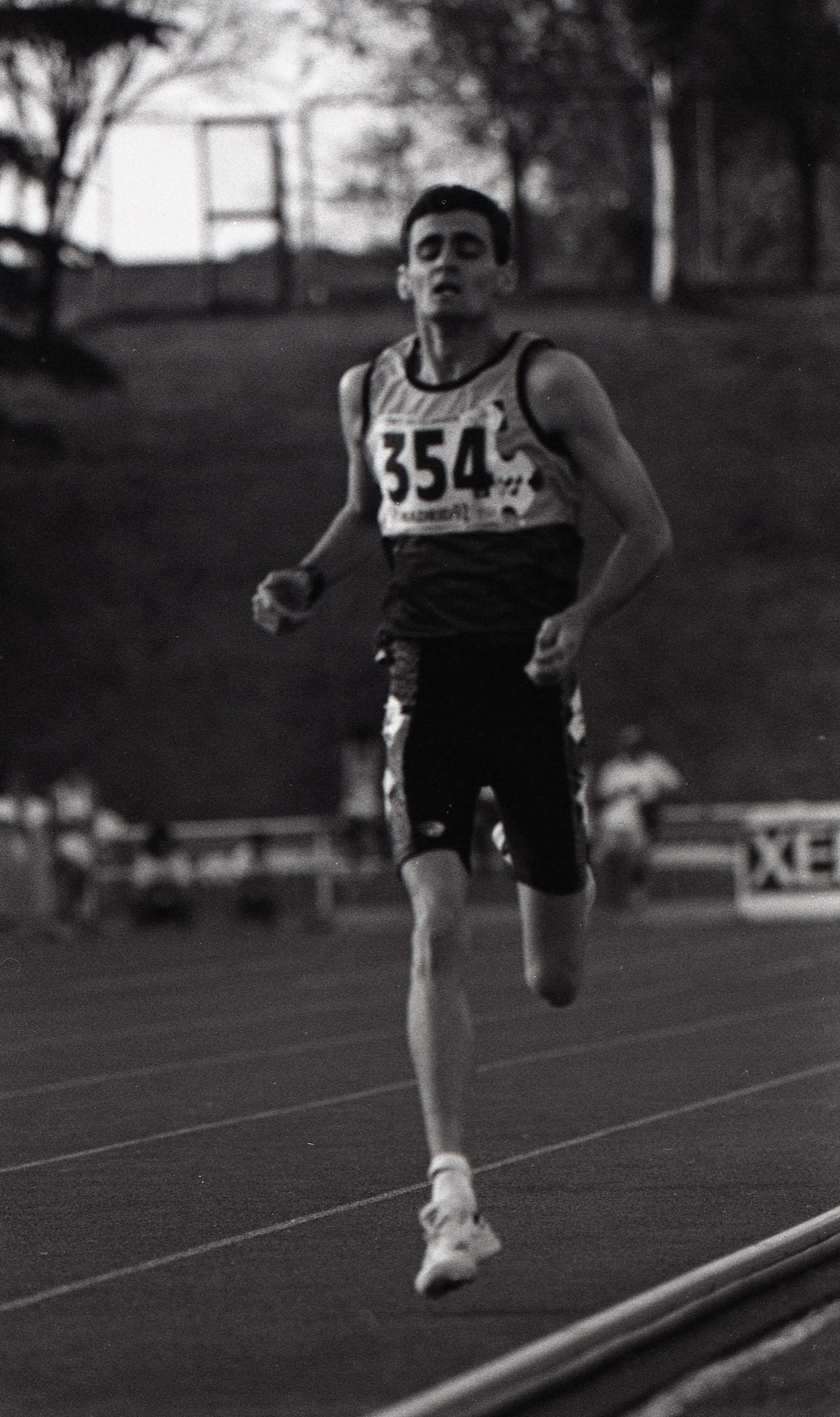
- Paul Mitchell competing at the 1992 Paralympic Games for Persons with Mental Handicap in Madrid, Spain

Personal information
- Full name: Paul Graham Frederick Mitchell
- Nationality: Australia
- Born: 24 October 1970 (age 55) England
Medal record
Athletics
Paralympic Games
Gold medal – first place	2000 Sydney	Men's 1500m T20
Paralympic Games for Persons with Mental Handicap
Silver medal – second place	1992 Madrid	Men's 1500 m
IPC Athletics World Championships
Gold medal – first place	1994 Berlin	Men's 800 m T20
Silver medal – second place	1998 Birmingham	Men's 5000 m T20

Paul Graham Frederick Mitchell, OAM (born 24 October 1970 in England) is a Paralympic athlete with an intellectual disability from Western Australia, Australia.

== Athletics career ==
At the 1992 Paralympic Games for Persons with Mental Handicap in Madrid, Spain, he won a silver medal in the Men's 1500 m. Competing at the 1994 IPC Athletics World Championships, he won a gold medal in the Men's 800 m T20. At the 1998 IPC Athletics World Championships, he competed in two events winning a silver medal in the Men's 5000m T20 and twelfth in the Men's 1500 m T20.

He won a gold medal, with a personal best, at the 2000 Sydney Games in the men's 1500m T20 event, for which he received a Medal of the Order of Australia. In 2000, he received an Australian Sports Medal. In 2000, he was a carpenter.
