= Shane Lewis (swimmer) =

Australian swimmer (1973–2021)

Personal information
- Born: 18 March 1973
- Died: 21 February 2021 (aged 47)

Sport
- Sport: Swimming
- Strokes: breaststroke

Shane Edward Lewis (18 March 1973 – 21 February 2021) was an Australian swimmer. He competed in the men's 100 metre breaststroke event at the 1992 Summer Olympics.
