= Anton Flavel =

Australian Paralympic athlete (born 1969)

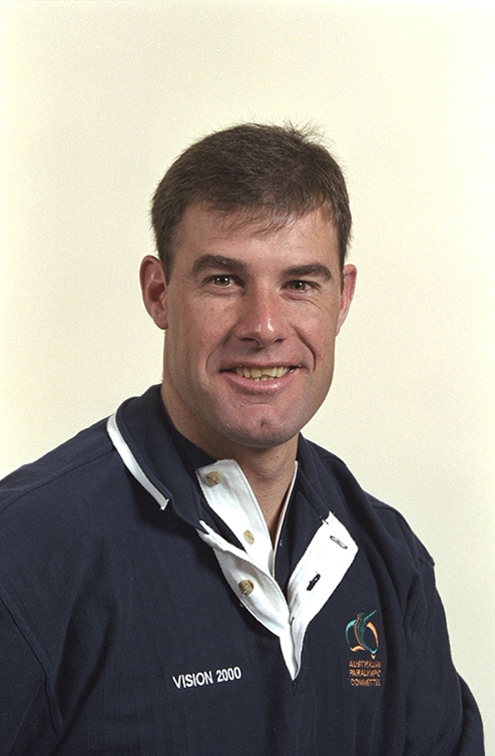
- 2000 Australian Paralympic team portrait of Flavel

Personal information
- Full name: Anton James Flavel
- Nationality: Australia
- Born: 3 May 1969 (age 57) Narrogin, Western Australia
Medal record
Athletics
Paralympic Games for Persons with Mental Handicap
Gold medal – first place	1992 Madrid	Men's Javelin
Bronze medal – third place	1992 Madrid	Men's Discus
Bronze medal – third place	1992 Madrid	Men's High Jump
IPC World Championships
Gold medal – first place	1994 Berlin	Men's Shot Put F20
Bronze medal – third place	1998 Birmingham	Men's Shot Put F20
Paralympic Games
Gold medal – first place	2000 Sydney	Men's Javelin F20

Anton James Flavel, OAM (born 3 May 1969) is an Australian athlete with an intellectual disability. He was born in the Western Australian town of Narrogin. In his disability class he held a world record for the javelin and an Australian record in the shot put and high jump.

Competing at the 1st World Games for Athletes with an Intellectual Disability in Härnösand, Sweden, he won two gold medals in the Men's Javelin and the Men's Discus, and a bronze medal in the Men's Long Jump. At the 1992 Paralympic Games for Persons with mental handicap in Madrid, Spain, which were held immediately after the 1992 Barcelona Paralympics, he won a gold medal in the men's javelin, for which he received a Medal of the Order of Australia. He also won bronze medals in the Men's High Jump and Men's Discus. He was coached in Perth, Western Australia by Hilda Collier.

At the IPC Athletics World Championships in the Men's Shot Put F20, he won a gold medal in 1994 and a bronze medal in 1998. At the 2000 Sydney Games, he won a gold medal in the Men's Javelin F20 event, and came ninth in the Men's Shot Put F20 event.

In 1997, he became the first intellectually disabled athlete to receive a residential scholarship from the Australian Institute of Sport (AIS) and was coached by Chris Nunn. The move to the AIS highlighted the more professional approach to training. In Perth, he was doing three sessions per week and at the AIS he was doing thirteen sessions. He left the AIS after the 2000 Sydney Games.

In 2000, he received an Australian Sports Medal.

He married Trish Flavel, who won a bronze medal in the Women's 800m T20 at the 2000 Sydney Games.
