= Rene Hardenbol =

Australian swimmer (born 1971)

Personal information
- Nationality: Australia
- Born: 17 May 1971 (age 55) Western Australia

Sport
- Sport: Swimming
Medal record
Swimming (S14)
Paralympic Games for Persons with Mental Handicap
Gold medal – first place	1992 Madrid	Men's 200 m Backstroke
Gold medal – first place	1992 Madrid	Men's 4 x 50 m Freestyle Relay
Gold medal – first place	1992 Madrid	Men's 4 x 100 m Freestyle Relay
Gold medal – first place	1992 Madrid	Men's 4 x 50 m Medley Relay
Gold medal – first place	1992 Madrid	Men's 4 x 100 m Medley Relay
Silver medal – second place	1992 Madrid	Men's 100 m Freestyle
Silver medal – second place	1992 Madrid	Men's 200 m Breaststroke
IPC World Swimming Championships
Gold medal – first place	1994 Malta	Men's 50m Backstroke S14
Gold medal – first place	1994 Malta	Men's 50m Breaststroke SB14
Gold medal – first place	1994 Malta	Men's 50m Freestyle S14
Silver medal – second place	1994 Malta	Men's 100 m Freestyle S14

Rene Hardenbol, OAM (born 17 May 1971) is an Australian swimmer with an intellectual disability. At the 1992 Paralympic Games for Persons with Mental Handicap, he won five gold medals and two silver medals.

== Personal ==
He was born on 17 May 1971 in Western Australia. At the age of 12 months, he was diagnosed with behavioural autism. In January 1983, his parents sent him to live in the Netherlands with his maternal grandmother and to attend the De Zevens-sprong School for children with special needs. Whilst in the Netherlands he was encouraged to take up swimming.

== Swimming career ==
At age 13, after he returned to Australia, he was coached by Barbara Evans at the Aqua Club between 1984 and 1985. before joining the Aqua Club of which he was made a life member in 1994. From 1986, he was coached by George Brown at the Victoria Park/Carlisle Swimming Club. In 1988, he won three gold and a silver medal at the Special Olympic Games in Sydney, New South Wales. At the 1st World Games for Athletes with an Intellectual Disability in Härnösand, Sweden, he won three gold, two silver and five bronze medals. He set world record times in the 400m freestyle, 200m freestyle and 200m backstroke.

At the 1992 Paralympic Games for Persons with Mental Handicap, Madrid, Spain, he won five gold medals in the Men's 200 m Backstroke, Men's 4 x 50 m Freestyle Relay, Men's 4 × 100 m Freestyle Relay, Men's 4 x 50 m Medley Relay, Men's 4 × 100 m Medley Relay and two silver medals in the Men's 100 m Freestyle and Men's 200 m Breaststroke. He set a world record in the 200m Backstroke. After the Games, he was offered an Australian Institute of Sport Athlete with a Disability scholarship.

He competed at the 1994 IPC Swimming World Championships in Malta and won three gold medals in the Men's 50m Backstroke S14, Men's 50m Breaststroke SB14, Men's 50m Freestyle S14 and a silver medal in the Men's 100 m Freestyle S14. He retired from Paralympic swimming at the end of 1994.

In 2014, he is a member of the Somerset Masters Swimming Club. He has also been a member of a four-person team who successfully completed the Rottnest Channel Swim.

== Recognition ==
- 1989 - Comment News Senior Sports Star of the Year
- 1991 - City of Gosnells Certificate of Merit for Meritorious Achievement in the field of Swimming
- 1993 - OAM for service to sport as a gold medallist at the Madrid 1992 Paralympic Games.
- 1994 - Caltex Sports Person of the Year, Special Olympics category
- 2000 - Australian Sports Medal
- 2014 - Victoria Park Sporting Walk of Fame
