= Endeavour Foundation =

Disability charity in Queensland, Australia

- Founded: 1951
- Type: Non-profit; NGO
- Headquarters: Brisbane, Australia
- Location: Australia
- Services: Human Service, Disability, Social
- Fields: Disability services and Advocacy
- CEO: David Swain
- Website: www.endeavour.com.au

Endeavour Foundation is a not-for-profit organisation, headquartered in Brisbane, Queensland, Australia. It is Australia's largest employer of people with an intellectual disability. The organisation was founded in 1951 by a group of parents advocating for education and support for their children with intellectual disability. It was formally established on December 31, 1952. It now supports thousands of people with disabilities across hundreds of locations in Queensland, New South Wales, and Victoria.

Its primary services are designed to support people with disability in their home, work, and community life, offering supported accommodation, learning and lifestyle programs, and community participation.

As a significant social enterprise, Endeavour Foundation is also Australia's largest employer of people with intellectual disability through its network of supported workplaces (Australian Disability Enterprises).

The organisation's operations are funded through a hybrid model that combines government funding (including the National Disability Insurance Scheme, NDIS), with revenue from its commercial enterprises, major fundraising activities, and the Endeavour Foundation Lotteries.

Endeavour Foundation is an active participant in public policy discussions, engaging in advocacy related to the NDIS and publicly welcoming the Disability Royal Commission into Violence, Abuse, Neglect and Exploitation of People with Disability.

== History and Heritage ==
Endeavour Foundation was founded in 1951 by a group of parents of children who sought access to education and support for their children with intellectual disability. At the time, children with an intellectual disability were excluded from mainstream education and community life.

The group was initially called the Queensland Sub-Normal Children's Welfare Association. In the 1950s, 'sub-normal' was the accepted term to describe a person with an intellectual disability, and it was endorsed in 1954 by the World Health Organisation. The group's ambition was to establish training centres to teach children simple unskilled work. The group received the patronage of Sir Fred Schonell, the first Professor of Education and later Vice-Chancellor of the University of Queensland.

Schonell was Endeavour Foundation's first President and extended his research interest in education for people with a disability by creating the Remedial Education Centre, now known as the Fred and Eleanor Schonell Special Education Research Centre, one of the first of its kind in the world.

In its first two years of operation, the organisation registered 300 children with an intellectual disability. The Association's first school and support group were established in June 1953 in a member's home at 170 Old Cleveland Road, Coorparoo, Brisbane. A teacher was employed to provide basic education to the children, putting into practice ideas developed at the University of Queensland. By 1954, the Association had grown beyond Brisbane, with the formation of the first regional sub-committees in Toowoomba and Ipswich. In May 1955, the centre moved to a large Queenslander-style house on an acre of land on Jordan Terrace, Bowen Hills, in Brisbane.

The organisation continued to expand rapidly, opening its first service for adults - a workplace in Bowen Hills, and its first accommodation service in Toowoomba in 1964.

In 1982, the Association voted to change its name from the Queensland Sub-Normal Children's Welfare Association to Endeavour Foundation, reflecting a change in societal attitudes towards people with a disability and the organisation's growth.

By 1984, Endeavour Foundation had grown to provide services to more than 3,500 people across Queensland in 25 schools, 12 workplaces, six farms, 34 adult residential homes, and numerous other facilities.

A significant change occurred in 1986, when the Queensland Department of Education took over the provision of education for children with an intellectual disability, including the education of the 1,075 children in Endeavour Foundation's 25 schools. Endeavour Foundation's focus then moved to supporting people with an intellectual disability post-school age.

In September 2009, Endeavour Foundation acquired Cumberland Industries in Western Sydney, which provided employment for a further 610 people with a disability, making Endeavour Foundation the largest non-government provider of direct disability employment in Australia.

In 2013, Endeavour Foundation opened a $3.8 million fully accredited food packaging facility in the Brisbane suburb of Wacol. This facility currently provides employment, training, and support for 221 people with a disability. The same year, Endeavour Foundation acquired Bay Support Services Group in Hervey Bay. When Bay Support Services went into voluntary liquidation, the Queensland Government asked Endeavour Foundation to take over the operations of the group, securing the support of 68 people with a disability and 230 staff positions.

In 2014, Endeavour Foundation was a recipient of a Queensland Greats Award.

Also in 2014, Endeavour Foundation amalgamated with two supported employment services, VATMI Group and Community Solutions Group. At that time, VATMI Group was the largest employer of people with a disability in Victoria. The merger with the Community Solutions Group, which included non-government organisations like TORGAS, Acclaim, and Skills Plus/BRACE, helped form Endeavour Foundation's Community Solutions division, which provides health and wellbeing, workforce (including apprenticeships), education, and training services.

In 2017, Endeavour Foundation completed construction of the Kingaroy Kitchen Cafe. The addition of a cafe to the already successful commercial kitchen provides more opportunities for people with a disability to develop skills working in hospitality and customer service.

In 2021, Endeavour Foundation was acknowledged by WorkSafe Queensland for its proactive response to the COVID-19 pandemic, enhancing safety processes and procedures to protect vulnerable people and staff.

From its beginnings in grassroots advocacy, the organisation continues to campaign for the rights and inclusion of people with a disability. Endeavour Foundation promotes access to education, employment, and community participation for people with an intellectual disability.

While much has changed over the last seven decades, the core objective and commitment of the organisation remain unchanged—to provide real possibilities and opportunities for people with a disability. Endeavour Foundation’s mission is to "support people with disability to make their possibilities a reality.”

== Services & Operations ==
Endeavour Foundation’s strategic plan is centred on helping people with intellectual disability feel included, empowered, and supported to lead full and purposeful lives where they can exercise choice and control. It is the largest non-government provider of direct disability services in Australia, supporting more than 4,000 people with disability across over 230 locations in Queensland, New South Wales, and Victoria. Most of its clients are adults with intellectual disabilities such as Down syndrome, autism spectrum disorders, and Fragile X syndrome.

Endeavour Foundation operates with a dual structure—combining government-funded service provision (mainly through the NDIS) and commercial operations via its social enterprises. This model supports financial sustainability and broadens employment opportunities for people with disability.

=== Home & Daily Life ===
The Foundation supports individuals to transition to more independent living through Supported Independent Living (SIL) and Specialist Disability Accommodation (SDA). Through its "My Home, My Life" initiative, it has invested more than $33 million in building and renovating accessible homes in Queensland.

=== Employment Services ===
Endeavour Foundation is the largest employer of people with disability in Australia, providing supported employment and vocational training aligned with personal employment goals. These services support development of job skills in both mainstream and in-house social enterprises.

Employment opportunities include work placements, training programs, and apprenticeships, all tailored to individual abilities and career pathways. Their social enterprises include industrial cleaning cloths, timber furniture, mailing and packing (including food and pharmaceuticals), e-waste recycling, document destruction, and agriculture. Additionally, Kingaroy Kitchen and QArt provide unique employment in the culinary and creative arts sectors.

=== Business Solutions (Social Enterprise) ===
Endeavour Foundation delivers commercial services to business and government clients while employing people with disability through a social enterprise model. Services include packing, recycling, document destruction, and timber/electrical product manufacturing.

=== Learning ===
The Foundation operates Learning and Lifestyle hubs that offer co-designed day programs focused on building practical life skills such as cooking, digital literacy, and travel training. Virtual Reality (VR) tools are also used to help participants safely practise work skills such as warehouse safety and road awareness.

=== Social & Community Participation ===
Social participation services help individuals engage with their local communities through one-on-one support, group activities, hobbies, and access to public spaces. This fosters social inclusion and builds independence.

=== Advocacy and Public Engagement ===
Endeavour Foundation actively participates in advocacy, especially around NDIS reforms and outcomes of the Disability Royal Commission. It has highlighted key areas such as reducing NDIS wait times and improving access to employment and housing.

=== Relationships & Independence ===
Endeavour Foundation provides a range of supports to enable people with disabilities to form positive relationships with friends, family and other important people in their lives. Communication skills including assistive technology, behavioural support to manage difficult emotions and behaviours and support groups are all available. All services are designed to allow customers to achieve greater independence, and choice and control over how they live their lives.

== Shops and products ==
Endeavour Foundation runs 26 recycled clothing stores in Queensland and New South Wales, known as Endo's, as well as an online eBay store. These stores sell new and recycled clothing, furniture, books, bedding and bric-a-brac.

Kingaroy Kitchen Fine Foods, which provides employment and training opportunities for 27 supported employees in the South Burnett region, produces hampers, preservative-free chutneys, marmalades, jams, biscuits and cakes available for purchase. The addition of a cafe in 2017 provides additional employment opportunities as well as the option for customers to dine-in and experience the Kingaroy Kitchen hospitality first-hand.

Endeavour Foundation has partnered with local Queensland councils to manage Tip Shops and Recycle Markets. There are currently ten Endeavour Foundation Tip Shops and Recycle Markets in Queensland that salvage and sell household items and furnishings, collectables, books and toys, and sporting equipment.

All funds raised through Endeavour Foundation's shops are reinvested into providing real possibilities for people with a disability. The stores also provide a valuable range of employment opportunities for people with disability.

== Fundraising ==
The Great Endeavour Rally is Endeavour Foundation's flagship annual fundraising event, which has been running for more than 30 years.

Endeavour Foundation is also well known for their prize home lotteries, which have been raising funds for the organisation for more than 40 years. Seven prize home lotteries and five Ultimate Life Changer lotteries are run each year.

All funds raised through lotteries and fundraising events go directly towards Endeavour Foundation's programs to support people with intellectual disability.

== Criticism and controversy ==
Endeavour Foundation has been subject to some criticism for its large size, conservatism, and influence on government policy. Since 2000, the organisation has been shedding property assets and closing some services.

In 2000 and 2001, Endeavour Foundation attracted major controversy when it decided to cut case management services, with some staff discovering their positions had been made redundant through the press. In 2004, Endeavour Foundation was again subject to criticism for its decision to cut the Specialist Services team, an innovative service supporting staff to support service users with challenging (aggressive and assaultive) behaviour, only to announce in October 2005 that it would be reinstating the staff support service in a reduced form (though the employment of Disability Advisors) and combining abuse response and advocacy functions.

== See also ==
- Social model of disability
- Social role valorization
