= Joseph Walker (swimmer) =

Australian swimmer

Joseph William Walker OAM
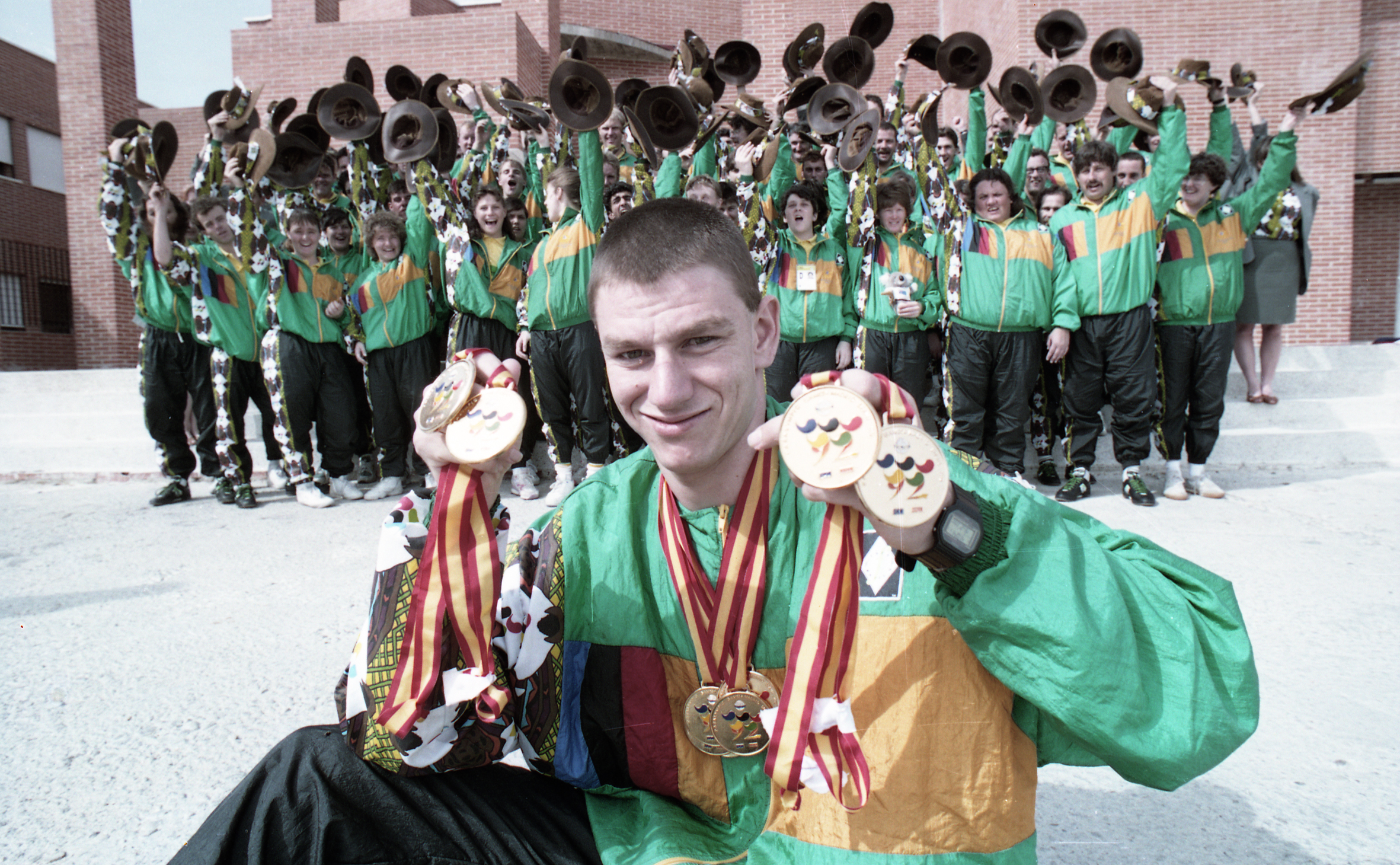
- Joseph Walker with his nine gold medals from the Madrid Games

Personal information
- Full name: Joseph William Walker
- Nickname: Joe
- Nationality: Australia
- Born: 20 June 1971 (age 55)

Sport
- Sport: Swimming
- Strokes: freestyle, butterfly
Medal record
Swimming (S14)
Paralympic Games for Persons with Mental Handicap
Gold medal – first place	1992 Madrid	Men's 100 m Freestyle
Gold medal – first place	1992 Madrid	Men's 200 m Freestyle
Gold medal – first place	1992 Madrid	Men's 50 m Butterfly
Gold medal – first place	1992 Madrid	Men's 100 m Butterfly
Gold medal – first place	1992 Madrid	Men's 4 x 50 m Freestyle Relay
Gold medal – first place	1992 Madrid	Men's 4 x 100 m Freestyle Relay
Gold medal – first place	1992 Madrid	Men's 4 x 50 m Medley Relay
Gold medal – first place	1992 Madrid	Men's 4 x 100 m Medley Relay
IPC World Swimming Championships
Gold medal – first place	1994 Malta	Men's 100 m Freestyle S14
Gold medal – first place	1994 Malta	Men's 50 m Butterfly
Silver medal – second place	1994 Malta	Men's 100 m Breaststroke SB14
Silver medal – second place	1994 Malta	Men's 50 m Freestyle S14
Bronze medal – third place	1994 Malta	Men's 50 m Backstroke S14

Joseph William Walker is an Australian swimmer with an intellectual disability. At the 1992 Paralympic Games for Persons with Mental Handicap, he won nine gold medals from nine events.

== Career ==
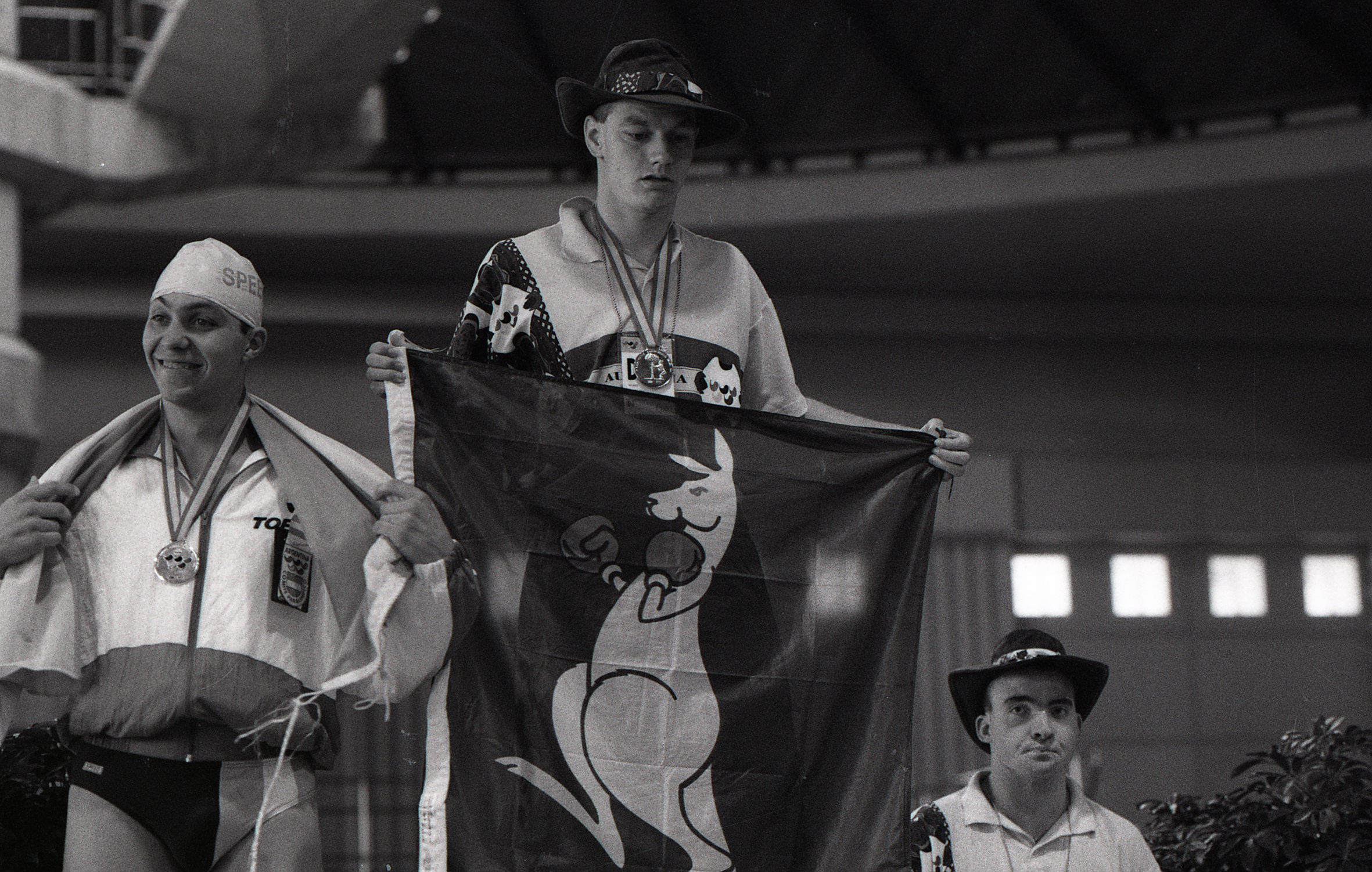

Walker started his swimming career with Eric Arnold's BHP Hunter Swim Club in the Newcastle, New South Wales area. He started training seriously at the age of 15.

At the 1992 Paralympic Games for Persons with Mental Handicap in Madrid, Spain, he won nine gold medals in the Men's 100 m Freestyle, Men's 200 m Freestyle, Men's 400 m Freestyle, Men's 50 m Butterfly, Men's 100 m Butterfly, Men's 4 x 50 m Freestyle Relay, Men's 4 × 100 m Freestyle Relay, Men's 4 x 50 m Medley Relay and Men's 4 × 100 m Medley Relay. He broke two individual world records - Men's 100 m Freestyle and Men's 100 m butterfly. This performance was unmatched in Australian Olympic and Paralympic history at the time. After the Games, he was awarded an Australian Institute of Sport Athletes with a Disability scholarship.

At the 1994 IPC Swimming World Championships, Valletta, Malta, he won two gold medals in Men's 100 m Freestyle S14 and Men's 50 m Butterfly S14, two silver medals in Men's 100 m Breaststroke SB14 and Men's 50 m Freestyle S14 and bronze medal in the Men's 50 m Backstroke S14.

He was not selected for the 1996 Atlanta Paralympics and took up basketball. He represented New South Wales for many years and represented Australia at the 2003 Special Olympics World Summer Games in Dublin, Ireland where his team took out the Silver Medal.

== Recognition ==
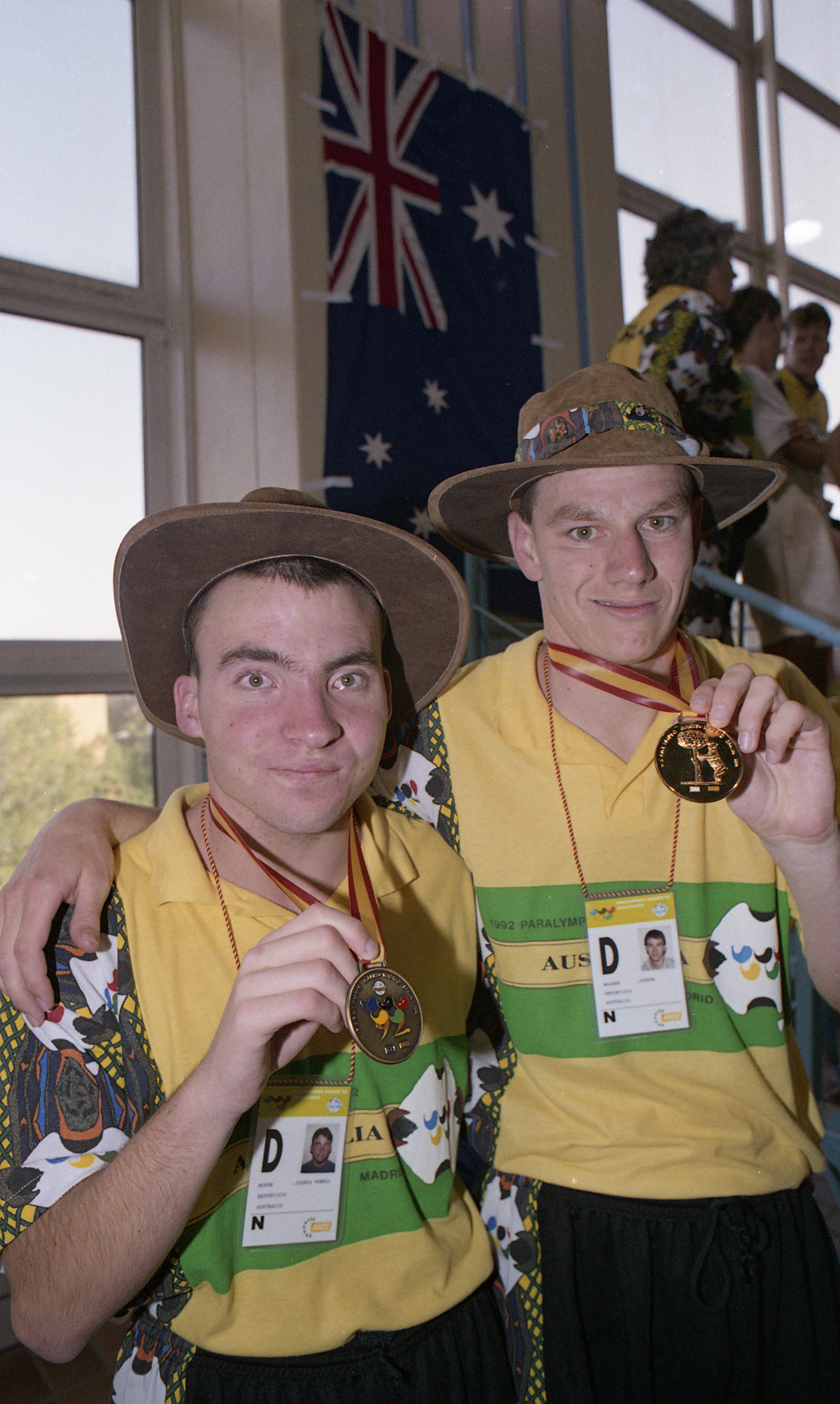

- 1993 - OAM for service to sport as a gold medallist at the Madrid 1992 Paralympic Games.
- 2000 - 2000 Sydney Paralympics Torch Relay
- Hunter Region Sporting Hall of Fame
