= Joshua Hofer =

Australian swimmer

Joshua Powell Hofer OAM
Personal information
- Nationality: Australia
- Born: 1973 (age 52–53)

Sport
- Sport: Swimming
Medal record
Swimming (S14)
Paralympic Games for Persons with Mental Handicap
Gold medal – first place	1992 Madrid	Men's 100 m Backstroke
Gold medal – first place	1992 Madrid	Men's 4 x 50 m Freestyle Relay
Gold medal – first place	1992 Madrid	Men's 4 x 100 m Freestyle Relay
Gold medal – first place	1992 Madrid	Men's 4 x 50 m Medley Relay
Gold medal – first place	1992 Madrid	Men's 4 x 100 m Medley Relay
Silver medal – second place	1992 Madrid	Men's 50 m Butterfly
Silver medal – second place	1992 Madrid	Men's 100 m Butterfly
Silver medal – second place	1992 Madrid	Men's 50 m Backstroke
Silver medal – second place	1992 Madrid	Men's 200 m Backstroke
Bronze medal – third place	1992 Madrid	Men's 200 m Freestyle
Bronze medal – third place	1992 Madrid	Men's 400 m Freestyle
IPC World Swimming Championships
Gold medal – first place	1994 Malta	Men's 50m Backstroke S14
Silver medal – second place	1994 Malta	Men's 50m Butterfly S14
Bronze medal – third place	1994 Malta	Men's 100m Freestyle S14

Joshua Powell Hofer is an Australian swimmer with an intellectual disability. At the 1992 Paralympic Games for Persons with Mental Handicap, he won eleven medals - five gold, four silver and two bronze medals.

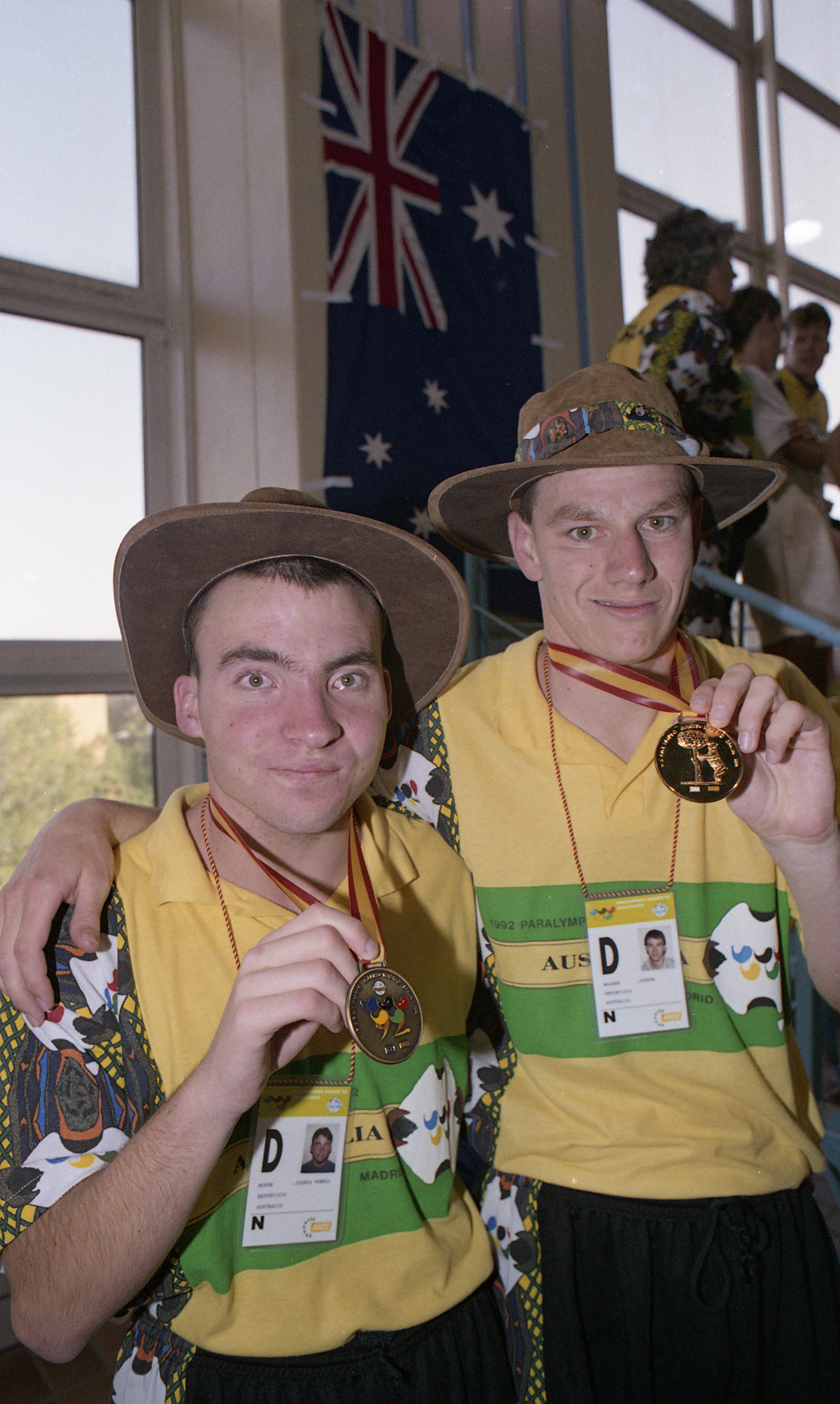
Joshua Hofer (left) with Joseph Walker (right) at the Madrid Games

== Personal ==
Hofer grew up in Perth, Western Australia and attended Christ Church Grammar School. He was employed for many years by Royal Perth Hospital supply department.

== Swimming career ==
In 1991, at the age of 17, he competed in swimming events at the 8th Special Olympics World Games in Minneapolis, Minnesota and won three gold medals in the Men's 4 x 50 m Freestyle Relay, Men's 200 m Freestyle Relay, Men's 100 m Backstroke and a bronze medal in the Men's 100 m Breaststroke.

At the 1992 Paralympic Games for Persons with Mental Handicap in Madrid, Spain, he won five gold medals in the Men's 100 m Backstroke, Men's 4 x 50 m Freestyle Relay, Men's 4 × 100 m Freestyle Relay, Men's 4 x 50 m Medley Relay and Men's 4 × 100 m Medley Relay, four silver medals in the Men's 50 m Butterfly, Men's 100 m Butterfly, Men's 50 m Backstroke, Men's 200 m Backstroke and two bronze medals in the Men's 200 m Freestyle and Men's 400 m Freestyle. In 1994, he competed at the first IPC Swimming World Championships in Malta and won a silver medal in the Men's 50 m Butterfly S14 and bronze medal in the Men's 100 m Freestyle S14.

In 2012, at the age of 38, he was training with the aim of competing at the 2012 London Paralympics. He is a member of the Beatty Park Masters Swimming Club.

== Recognition ==
- 1993 - OAM for service to sport as a gold medallist at the Madrid 1992 Paralympic Games.
- 2000 - Australian Sports Medal
