= Australia at the 1992 Summer Paralympics =

- IPC code: AUS
- NPC: Australian Paralympic Committee
- Website: www.paralympic.org.au

in Barcelona
- Competitors: 134 in 13 sports
- Flag bearer: Terry Giddy (Opening) Priya Cooper (Closing)
- Medals Ranked 5th: Gold 37 Silver 37 Bronze 36 Total 110

Summer Paralympics appearances (overview)
- 1960; 1964; 1968; 1972; 1976; 1980; 1984; 1988; 1992; 1996; 2000; 2004; 2008; 2012; 2016; 2020; 2024

Australia competed at the 1992 Paralympic Games in Barcelona for physically and vision-impaired athletes. Immediately after the Barcelona Games, the city of Madrid held events for athletes with an intellectual disability. The Madrid results are not included in International Paralympic Committee Historical Results Database. Australia finished 7th in the total medal count, winning 76 medals (24 gold, 27 silver and 25 bronze medals). Australia competed in 13 sports and won medals in 3 sports – swimming, athletics and weightlifting. Australia finished first in the medal tally at the 1992 Paralympic Games for Persons with Mental Handicap in Madrid.

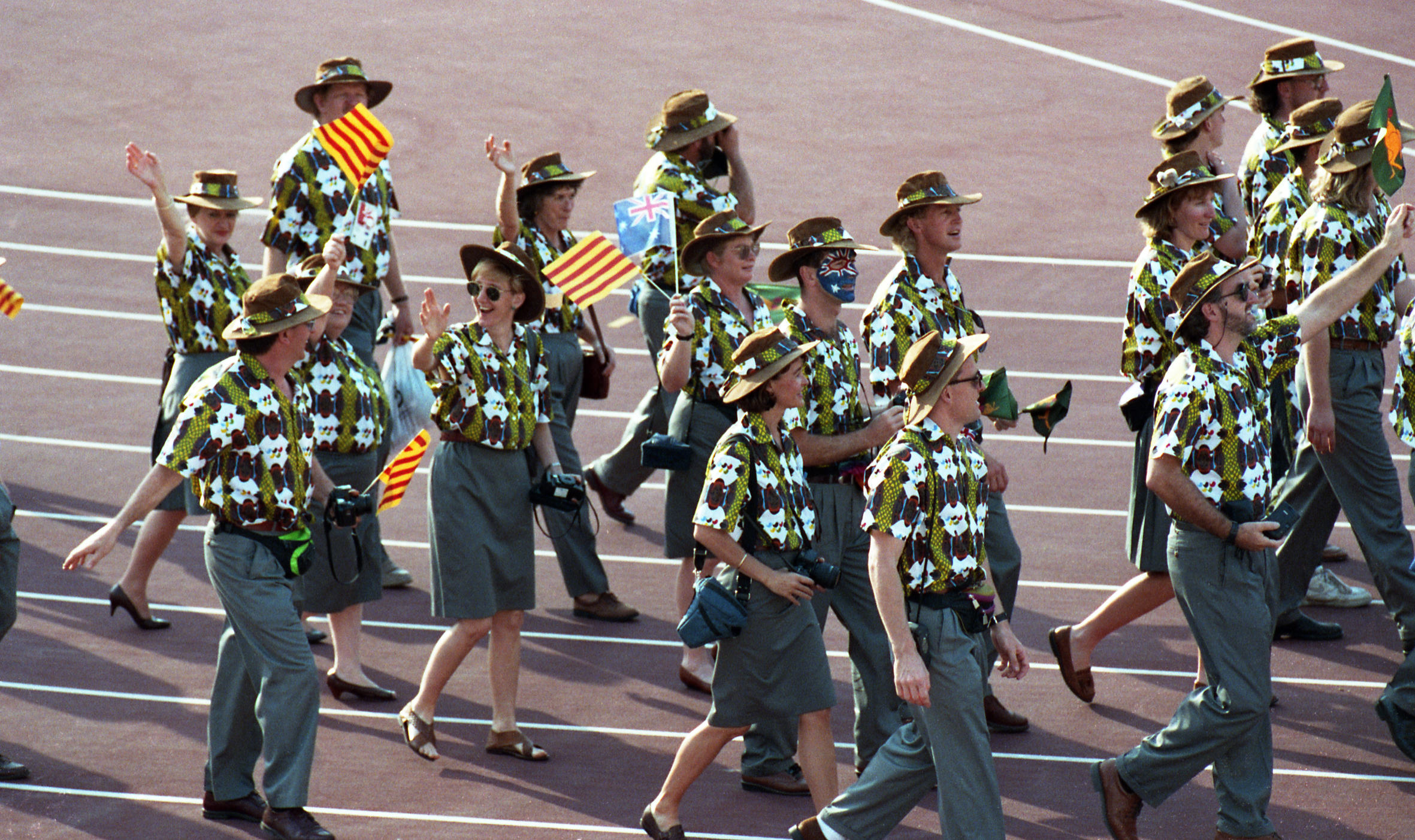
Australian Paralympic Team at opening ceremony of 1992 Barcelona Games

== Notable performances ==
Notable Australian performances included:

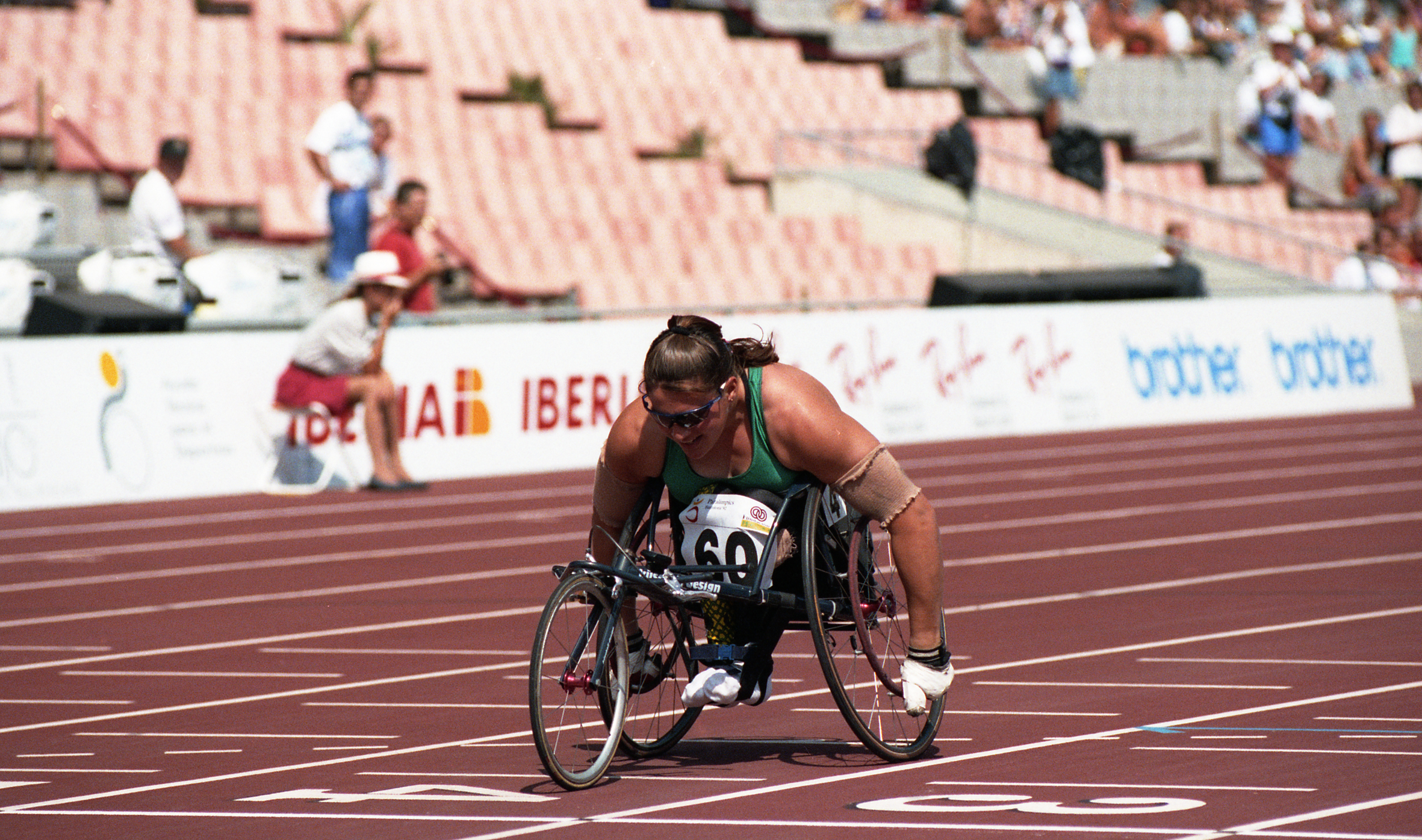
Triple gold medalist Louise Sauvage racing

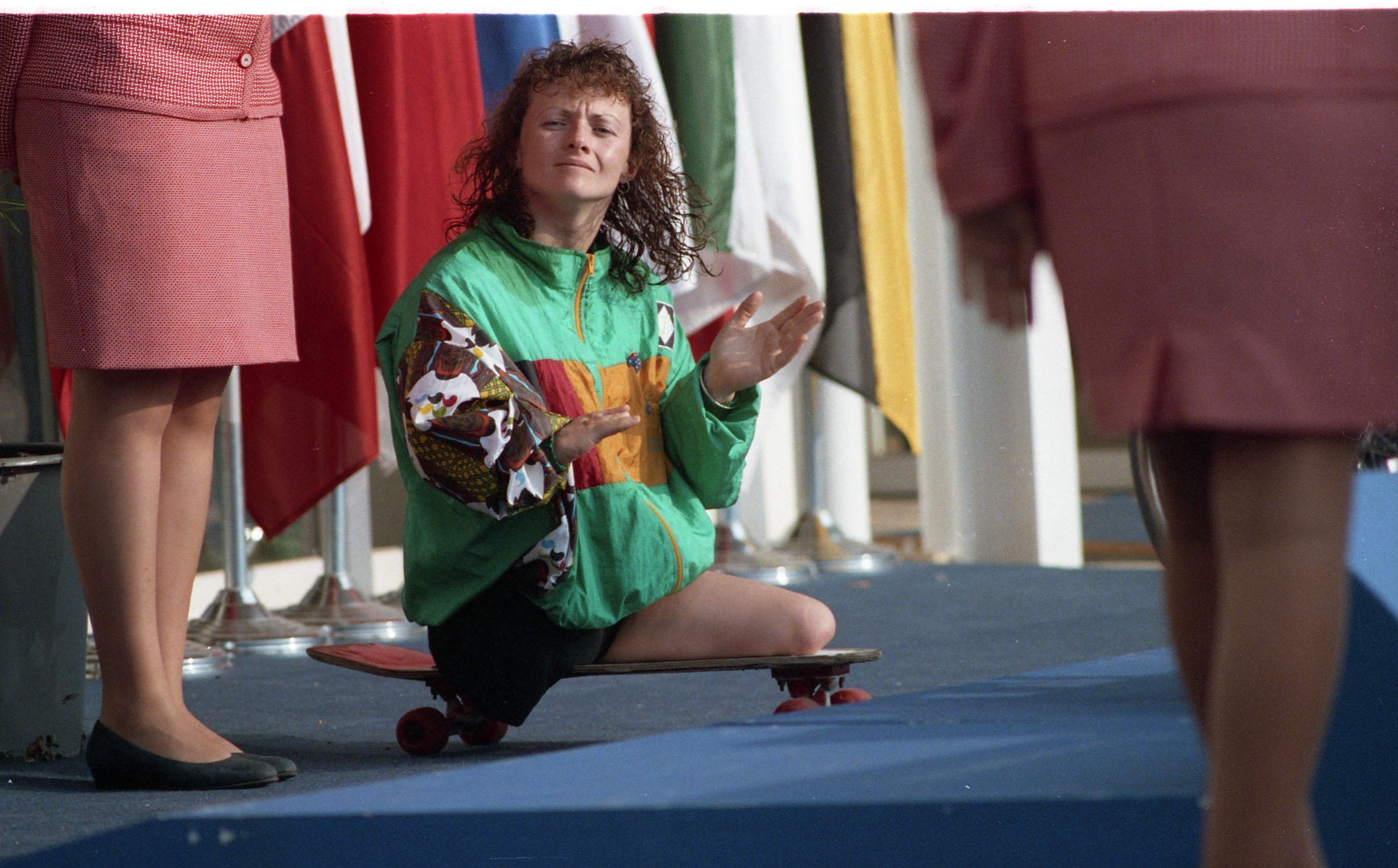
Anne Currie, triple gold medallist at the Barcelona Games

- Louise Sauvage, a wheelchair racer, winning 3 gold medals and 1 silver medal. In her first Paralympics, Louise Sauvage, at only 19 became the first women to break the 30-second mark for the 200m with a time of 29.03, winning her third gold medal of the games. "You get such a buzz when you win, I love it", Sauvage said.
- Priya Cooper, a cerebral palsy swimmer, winning 3 gold medals and 2 silver medals She carried the Australian flag at the closing ceremony.
- Anne Currie, an S6 swimmer, winning 3 gold and 1 bronze medals
- Four athletes won two gold medals – visually impaired thrower Russell Short, cerebral palsy sprinter Alison Quinn, visually impaired swimmer Tracey Cross and swimmer Tracy Barrell
- Jodi Willis competed in athletics and goalball and won gold in the Women's Shot Put B2 and silver in the Women's Discus B2. She was the last Australian athlete to compete in more than one sport at the same Games. Previously many athletes had competed in multiple sports at the same Games.

== Team ==
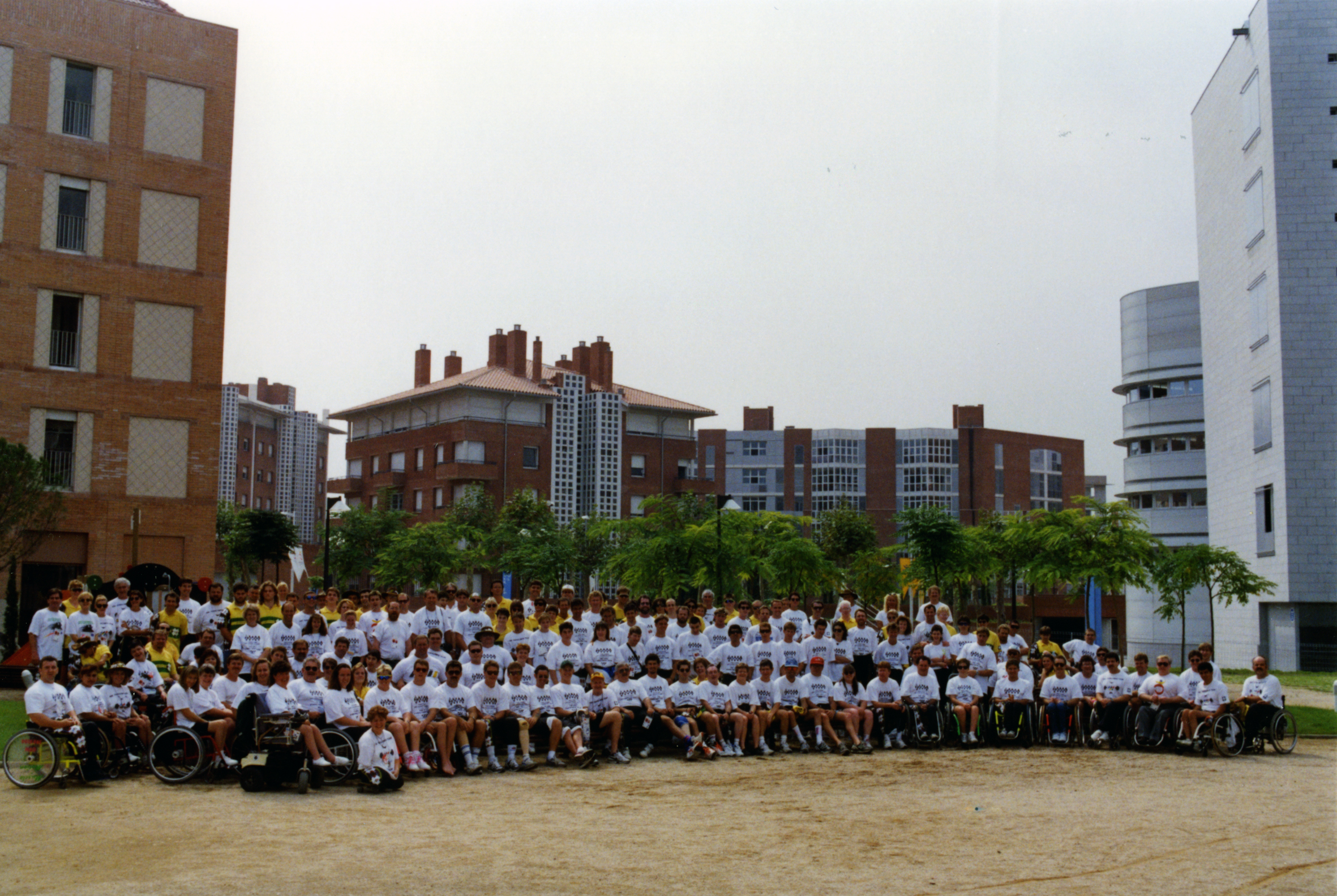
Australian team portrait at Barcelona Games

Australia was represented by 134 athletes (93 men and 41 women). The team was organised around disabilities – amputee, cerebral palsy, vision impaired and wheelchair. Each disability group had its own section manager and staff. This was the last time the Australian team was organised in this manner. The Chef de Mission was George Dunstan.

=== Team headquarters staff ===
Administration – George Dunstan (Chef de Mission), Derry Beavis (Team Manager), Judy Haines, Paul Griffiths, Adrienne Smith
Section Managers – Paul Bird (Amputee), Gary Prior (Vision impaired), Corny van Eldik (Cerebral palsy), Michael Godfrey-Roberts (Wheelchair)
Medical – John Burke (Team Medical Officer), Norma Beer, Jane Buckley, Nicola Meintjes, Don Perriman, Greg Ungerer, Lyn Wilcox
Escorts – Joanne Sayers, Craig Jarvis, Rob Stubbs

== Medalists ==
Medal	Name	Sport	Event
Gold	John Lindsay	Athletics	Men's 200 m TW3
Gold	Allan Butler, Neil Fuller, Karl Feifar, Rodney Nugent	Athletics	Men's 4 × 100 m relay TS2,4
Gold	Darren Thrupp	Athletics	Men's Long jump C7–8
Gold	Russell Short	Athletics	Men's Discus throw B3
Gold	Russell Short	Athletics	Men's Shot put B3
Gold	Bruce Wallrodt	Athletics	Men's Discus throw B3
Gold	Alison Quinn	Athletics	Women's 100 m C7–8
Gold	Alison Quinn	Athletics	Women's 200 m C7–8
Gold	Louise Sauvage	Athletics	Women's 100 m TW4
Gold	Louise Sauvage	Athletics	Women's 200 m TW4
Gold	Louise Sauvage	Athletics	Women's 400 m TW4
Gold	Donna Smith	Athletics	Women's Javelin throw THS2
Gold	Jodi Willis	Athletics	Women's Shot put B2
Gold	Tracy Barrell	Swimming	Women's 50 m butterfly S3–4
Gold	Priya Cooper	Swimming	Women's 50 m freestyle S8
Gold	Tracey Cross	Swimming	Women's 100 m freestyle B1
Gold	Tracey Cross	Swimming	Women's 100 m 400 m freestyle B1
Gold	Anne Currie	Swimming	Women's 100 m freestyle S6
Gold	Priya Cooper	Swimming	Women's 100 m freestyle S8
Gold	Priya Cooper	Swimming	Women's 200 m individual medley SM6–7
Gold	Anne Currie	Swimming	Women's 200 m freestyle S6
Gold	Mandy Maywood	Swimming	Women's 100 m Breaststroke B3
Gold	Sandra Yaxley, Tracy Barrell, Catherine Huggett, Anne Currie	Swimming	Women's 4×50 m freestyle relay S1–6
Gold	Brian McNicholl	Weightlifting	Men's 90 kg
Silver	John Lindsay	Athletics	Men's 100 m TW3
Silver	Neil Fuller	Athletics	Men's 200 m TS2
Silver	Neil Fuller	Athletics	Men's 400 m TS2
Silver	Alan Dufty, Greg Smith, Fabian Blattman, Vincenzo Vallelonga	Athletics	Men's 4 × 100 m relay TW1–2
Silver	Karl Feifar	Athletics	Men's Long jump J2
Silver	John Eden	Athletics	Men's Discus throw THS2
Silver	Bruce Wallrodt	Athletics	Men's Discus throw THW4
Silver	Bruce Wallrodt	Athletics	Men's Shot put THW4
Silver	Terry Giddy	Athletics	Men's Discus throw THW6
Silver	Tony Head	Athletics	Men's Javelin throw THS3
Silver	Kerrod McGregor	Athletics	Men's Pentathlon PS3
Silver	Marsha Green	Athletics	Women's 200 m B2
Silver	Louise Sauvage	Athletics	Women's 800 m TW4
Silver	Jodi Willis	Athletics	Women's Discus throw B2
Silver	Donna Smith	Athletics	Women's Shot put THS2
Silver	Kingsley Bugarin	Swimming	Men's 100 m breaststroke B2
Silver	Kingsley Bugarin	Swimming	Men's 200 m breaststroke B2
Silver	Kingsley Bugarin	Swimming	Men's 200 m individual medley B2
Silver	Judith Young	Swimming	Women's 50 m freestyle S10
Silver	Tracey Cross	Swimming	Women's 100 m backstroke B1
Silver	Priya Cooper	Swimming	Women's 100 m backstroke S8
Silver	Priya Cooper	Swimming	Women's 400 m freestyle S8
Silver	Kelly Barnes	Swimming	Women's 100 m butterfly S9
Silver	Kelly Barnes	Swimming	Women's 200 m individual medley SM9
Silver	Danae Sweetapple	Swimming	Women's 100 m freestyle B2
Silver	Tracey Cross	Swimming	Women's 200 m individual medley B1
Silver	Jason Diederich	Swimming	Men's 100 m butterfly S10
Bronze	Jaime Romaguera	Athletics	Men's 100 m C5
Bronze	Neil Fuller	Athletics	Men's 100 m TS2
Bronze	Darren Collins	Athletics	Men's 200 m B1
Bronze	Darren Collins	Athletics	Men's 400 m B1
Bronze	John Lindsay	Athletics	Men's 400 m TW3
Bronze	Sam Rickard	Athletics	Men's 800 m B3
Bronze	Greg Smith	Athletics	Men's Marathon TW2
Bronze	Alan Dufty, Greg Smith, Fabian Blattman, Vincenzo Vallelonga	Athletics	Men's 4 × 400 m relay TW1–2
Bronze	Michael Hackett	Athletics	Men's High jump J2
Bronze	Russell Short	Athletics	Men's Javelin throw B3
Bronze	Terry Giddy	Athletics	Men's Shot put THW6
Bronze	Marsha Green	Athletics	Women's 400 m B2
Bronze	Kingsley Bugarin	Swimming	Men's 50 m freestyle B2
Bronze	Brendan Burkett	Swimming	Men's 50 m freestyle S9
Bronze	Kieran Modra	Swimming	Men's 100 m backstroke B3
Bronze	Kieran Modra	Swimming	Men's 200 m backstroke B3
Bronze	Stephen Simmonds	Swimming	Men's 200 m individual medley SM10
Bronze	Danae Sweetapple	Swimming	Women's 50 m freestyle B2
Bronze	Danae Sweetapple	Swimming	Women's 100 m backstroke B2
Bronze	Judith Young	Swimming	Women's 100 m butterfly S10
Bronze	Judith Young	Swimming	Women's 200 m individual medley SM10
Bronze	Anne Currie	Swimming	Women's 50 m freestyle S6
Bronze	Tracey Oliver	Swimming	Women's 50 m freestyle S7
Bronze	Sandra Yaxley	Swimming	Women's 100 m freestyle S6
Bronze	Mandy Maywood	Swimming	Women's 200 m breaststroke B1–3

Medals by discipline
Discipline	Gold medal	Silver medal	Bronze medal	Total
Archery	0	0	0	0
Athletics	13	15	12	41
Boccia	0	0	0	0
Cycling	0	0	0	0
Wheelchair fencing	0	0	0	0
Football seven-a-side	0	0	0	0
Judo	0	0	0	0
Powerlifting	1	0	0	1
Shooting	0	0	0	0
Swimming	10	12	13	34
Table tennis	0	0	0	0
Volleyball	0	0	0	0
Wheelchair basketball	0	0	0	0
Wheelchair tennis	0	0	0	0
Total	24	27	25	76

== Events ==
=== Archery ===
Archery was first included in the 1960 Paralympic Games and has been included in every games since, making it one of the oldest sporting events for disabled athletes. Archery is open to cerebral palsy, amputee and wheelchair athletes.
Australia represented by:
Men – Arthur Fisk, Eric Klein

Australia did not win any medals.

Results

Athlete	Event	Result	Rank
Eric Klein	Men's Individual AR2	1184	12
Arthur Fisk	Men's Individual AR2	1168	17

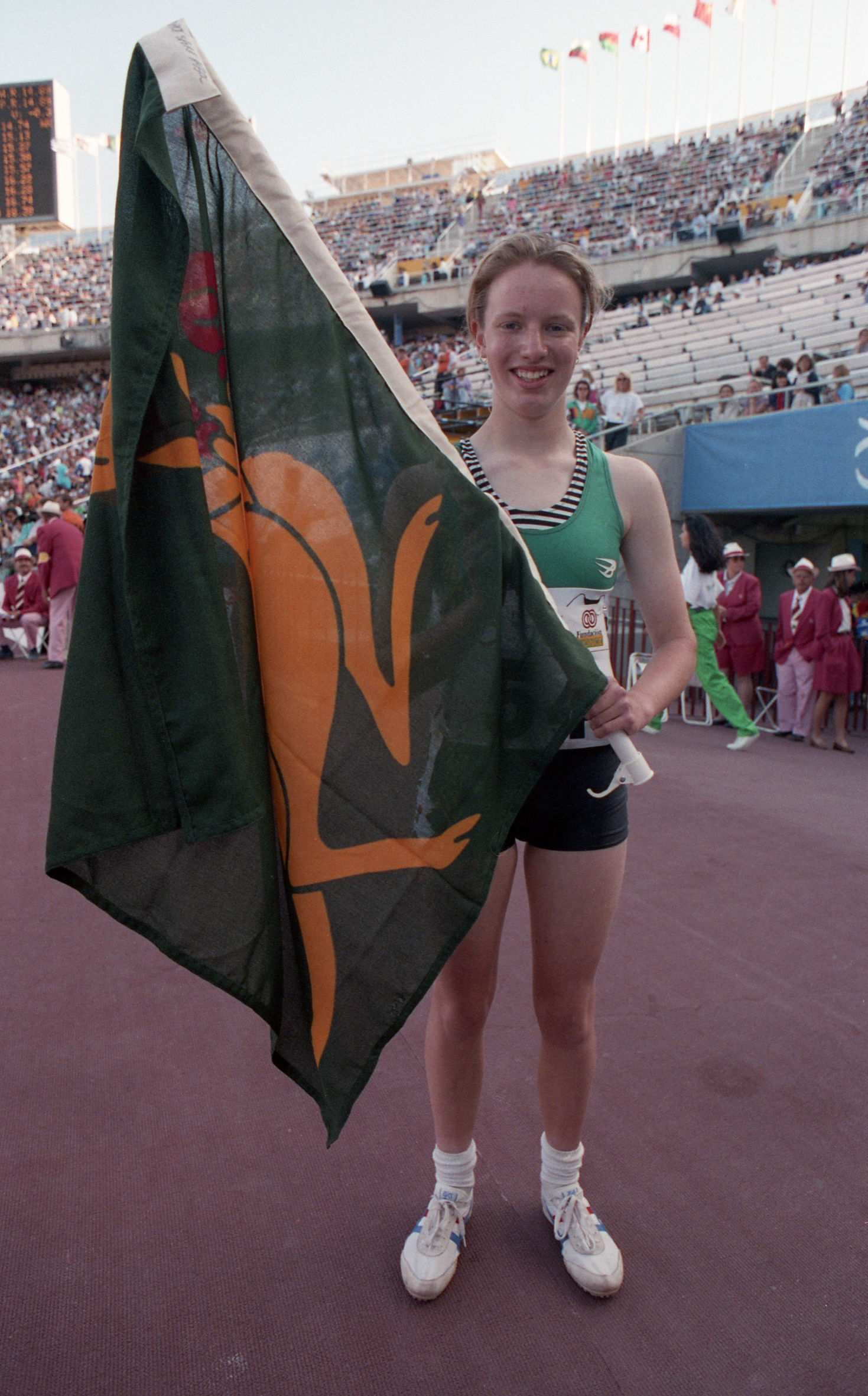
Sprinter Alison Quinn holding the boxing kangaroo flag at the Barcelona 1992 Paralympic Games

=== Athletics ===
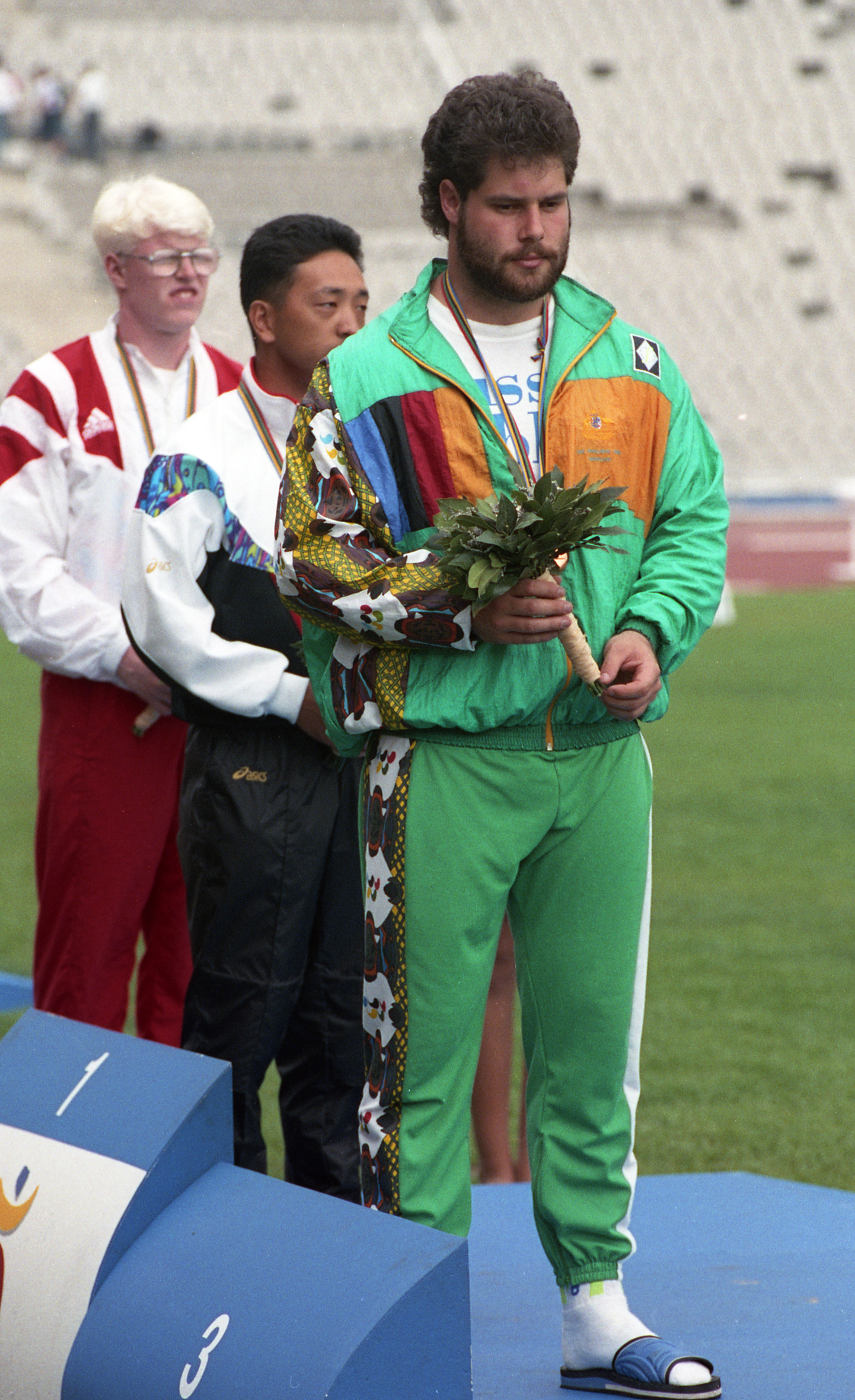
Thrower Russell Short, a double gold medallist on the podium

Athletics, being one of the oldest Paralympic Sports, includes a number of different field events. These events are high jump, long jump, triple jump, shot-put, discus, javelin, club and the pentathlon. There are different classifications according to levels of impairment for athletes to compete in, and the letters are used to indicate the type of event, with 'T' meaning track event and 'F' meaning field event.

Australia represented by:
Men – Robert Biancucci, Fabian Blattman, David Bonavita, Brendan Bowden, Allan Butler, Darren Collins, Paul Croft, Mark Davies, Phillip Deveraux, Alan Dufty, John Eden, David Evans, Karl Feifar, Neil Fuller, Terry Giddy, David Goodman, Michael Hackett, Tony Head, Edward Holicky, John Lindsay, Hamish MacDonald, Stuart Miller (guide for Darren Collins), Kerrod McGregor, Kieran Modra, Michael Nugent, Rodney Nugent, Sam Rickard, Jaime Romaguera, Eric Russell, Craig Sayers, Christopher Scott, Russell Short, Greg Smith, Bradley Thomas, Darren Thrupp, Vincenzo Vallelonga, Bruce Wallrodt, Mark Whiteman, Ross Whyte, Paul Wiggins, Jason Willis, Matthew van Eldik, Kyrra Grunnsund

Australia's first medal of the ninth Paralympic Games in Barcelona was won by Canberra-based John Eden who won a silver medal in discus setting a new Australian record with a throw of 39.94 metres.

Women – Marsha Green, Yvette McLellan, Alison Quinn, Louise Sauvage, Donna Smith, Karen Smith, Jodi Willis
Coaches – Chris Nunn (amputee), Karen Denman (Cerebral palsy), Jo Hogan (cerebral palsy), Jenni Banks (Wheelchair)
Officials – David Reid (Blind Athletics Manager), Trevor Goddard (guide runner), Stuart Miller (guide runner), Rick Grant (personal attendant)

Athletics was Australia's most successful sport, delivering 40 medals – 13 gold, 15 silver and 12 bronze. 12 athletes came home with individual gold medals. Australia placed 6 in the overall medal tally for athletics.

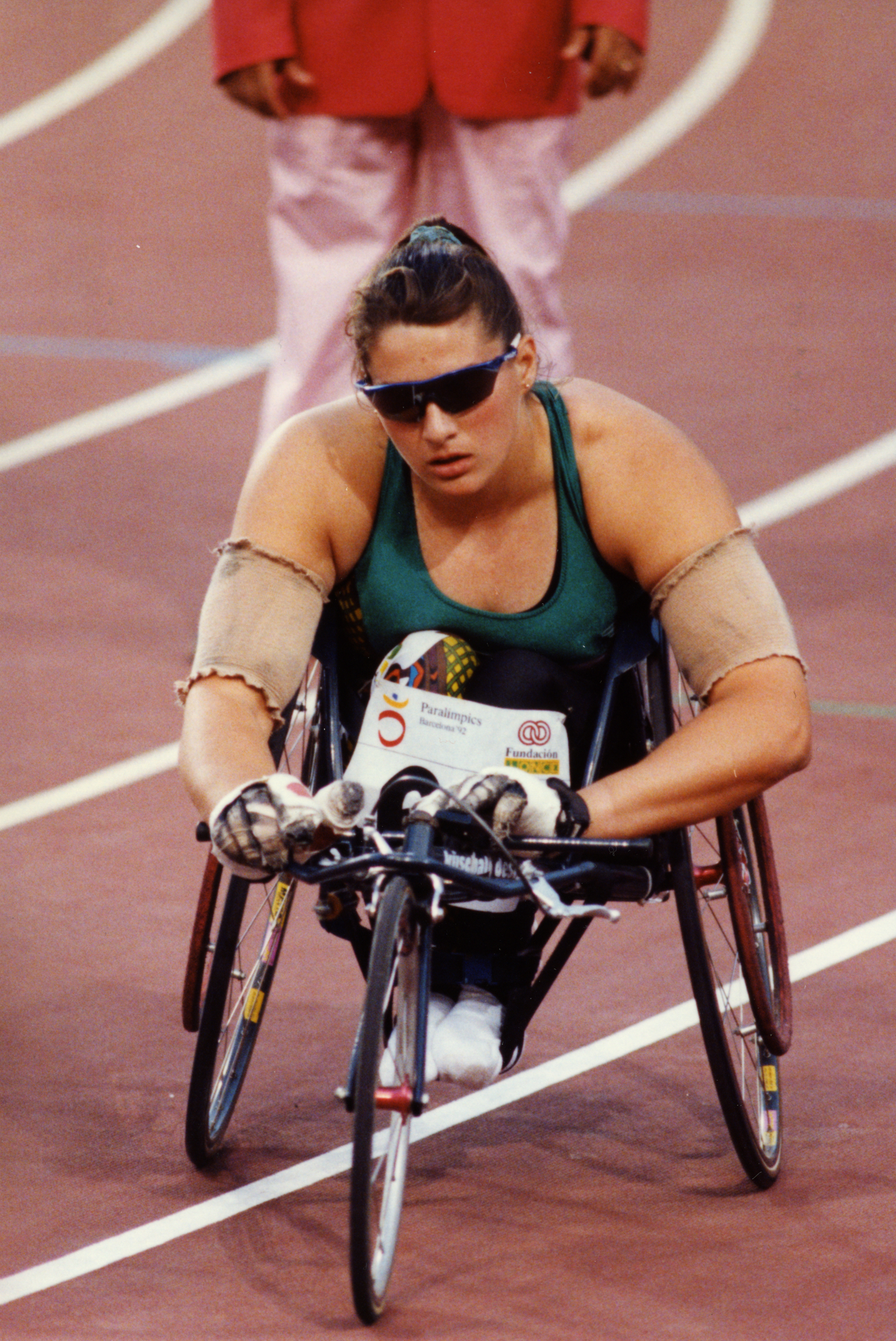
Louise Sauvage at the 1992 Barcelona Paralympic Games

"I have now been to three Paralympics and I belong to a very special group of athletes. Barcelona was the beginning of it all. I will never forget my first Paralympic gold medal and the feeling of having it around my neck with the anthem being played and the Australian flag raised up high because I was the best in the world. Barcelona gave me the taste and I wanted more."

— Louise Sauvage

Athlete	Event	Result	Rank
Allan Butler, Karl Feifar, Neil Fuller, Rodney Nugent	Men's 4 × 100 m Relay TS2,4	45.95 WR	Gold medal
John Lindsay	Men's 200m TW3	27.45 WR	Gold medal
Russell Short	Men's Discuss B3	45.94m PR	Gold medal
Russell Short	Men's Shot Put B3	13.81m PR	Gold medal
Darren Thrupp	Men's Long Jump	5.78 WR	Gold medal
Bruce Wallrodt	Men's Javelin THW4	25.56 PR	Gold medal

WR = World record

PR = Paralympic record

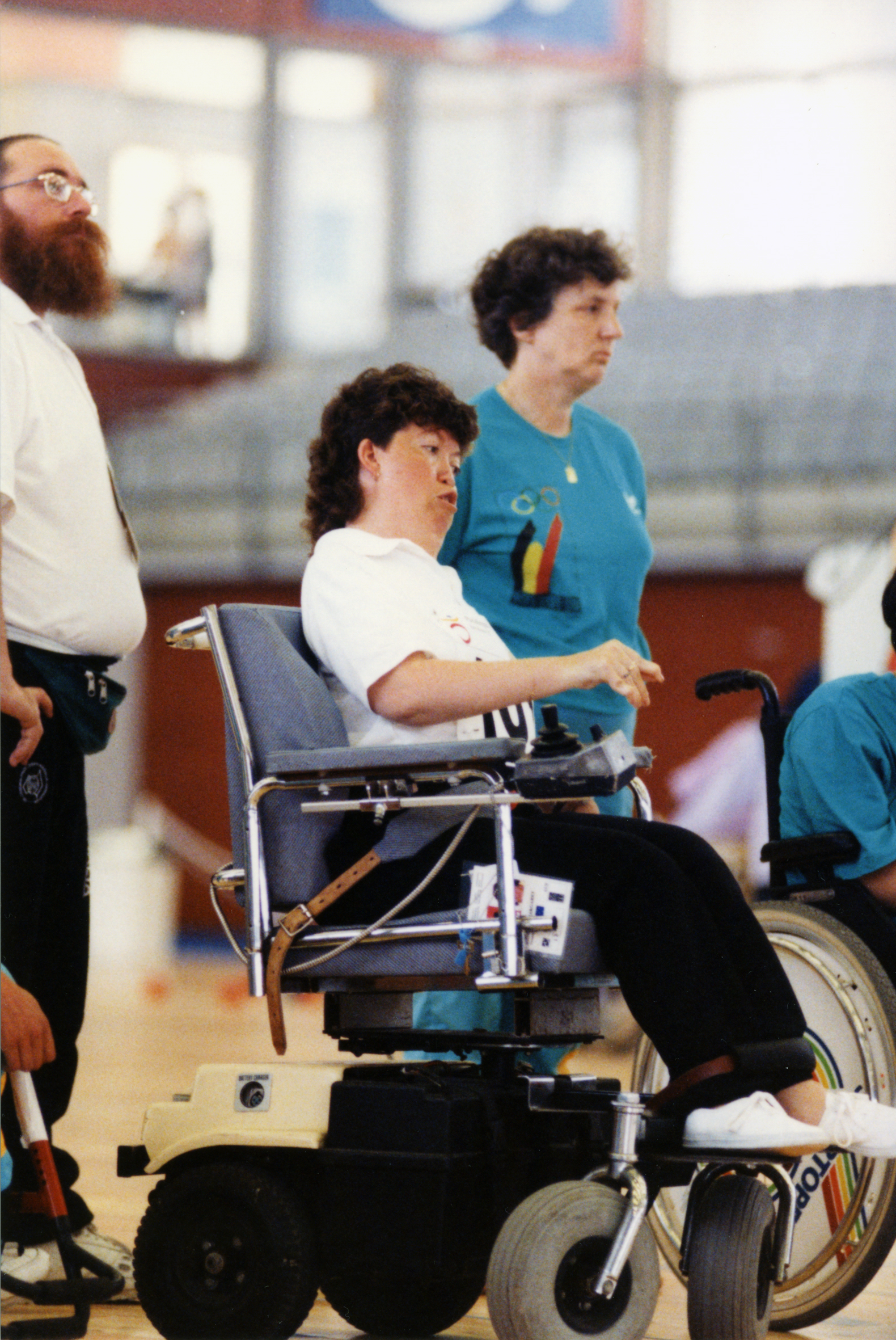
Australian boccia player Lynette Coleman

=== Boccia ===
Boccia was first included in the Paralympics in the 1992 Summer Paralympic Games. It started out originally as a team sport for athletes with cerebral palsy, and the disabled players use bowling ramps that have been specially designed to bowl Boccia balls as close as possible to the white jack.

Australia represented by:
Men – Burke Gibbons, Corey Molan, Alexander Xeras
Women – Lyn Coleman
Officials – Tom Organ (Manager)

Australia did not win any medals.

=== Cycling ===
Cycling was originally competed in by athletes with vision impairment, with the first events being in the early 1980s. However, in the 1992 Paralympics, events for vision-impaired, amputee and cerebral palsy athletes were combined for the first time. Sighted front riders compete with vision-impaired cyclists in tandem.

Australia represented by:
Men – Ronald Anderson, Paul Clohessy, Craig Elliott, Timothy Harris (Pilot for Prue-Anne Reynalds), Paul Lamond (Pilot for Ron Anderson), Stephen John Smith, Peter Stoltzer (Pilot for Paul Clohessy)
Women – Prue-Anne Reynalds
Officials – Ken Norris (Manager)

Australia did not win any medals.

=== Goalball ===
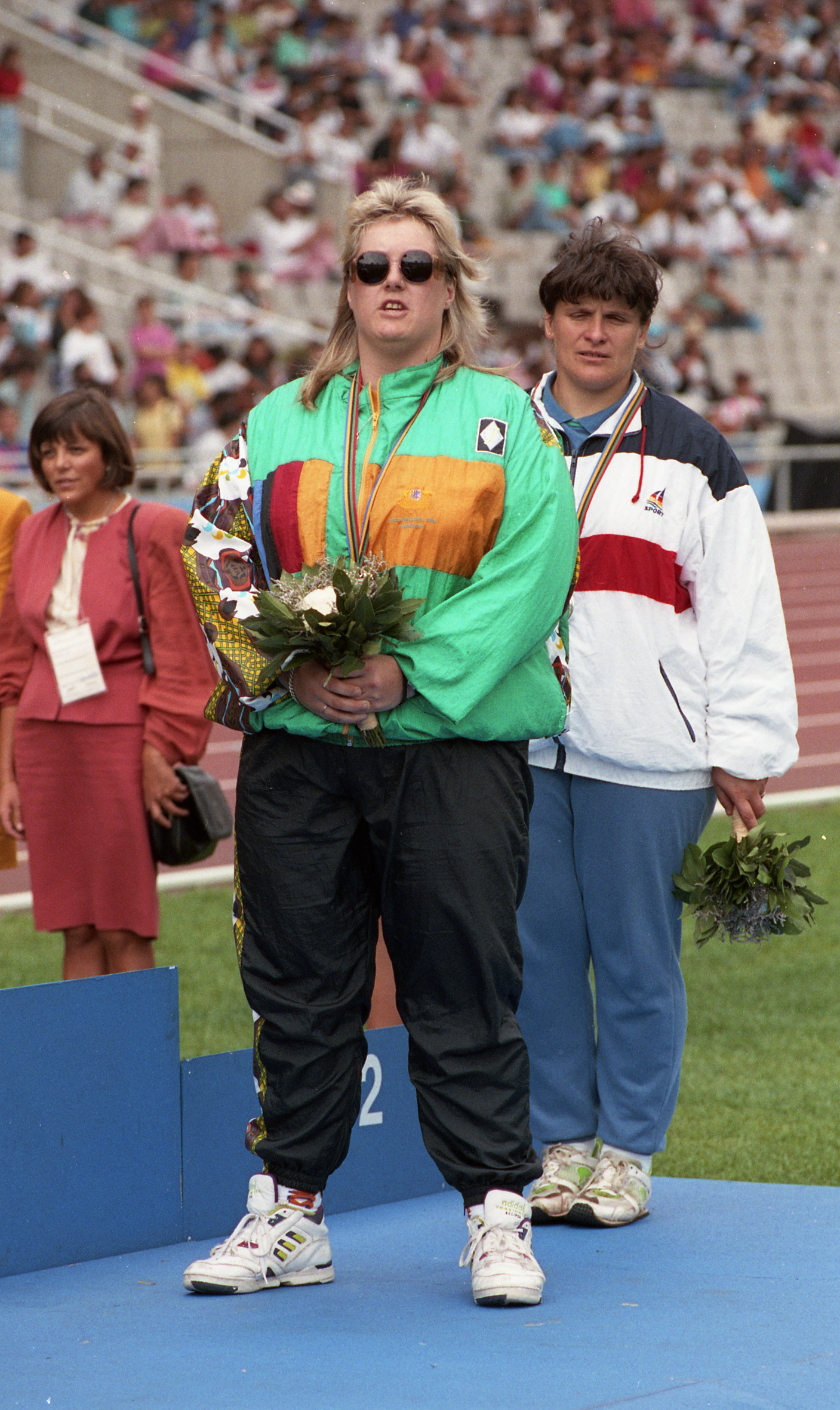
Australian athlete Jodi Willis stands at the podium after winning the Women's Shot Put B2 event at the 1992 Summer Paralympics.

Goalball is the only Paralympic team sport for vision-impaired athletes and has been part of the competition program since 1976. It is played by two teams of three players who are all blindfolded. The games is played with a ball with noise bells inside. The object is to throw the ball in an underarm style at high speed over the opponent's goal line. Teams defend their goal by lunging in front of the ball to block it with their bodies. Some players can throw the ball at speeds of more than 70 kmh.

Australia represented by:
Men – Robert Crestani, Kevin Frew, Warren Lawton, Brett Scarr, Gregory Scott, Mark Scarr
Women – Kerrie-Ann Day, Marilyn Mills, Jennette Saxberg, Robyn Stephens, Jodi Willis
Officials – Sam Theodore (Manager), Karen Scott (escort)

Australia did not win any medals.

Classifications
Athletes in classes B1-B3 compete in an open event (B1 athletes either have no light perception at all or very limited light perception, B3 athletes have the maximum allowable level of vision). All players wear light-resistant goggles to ensure no visual advantage on court.

=== Judo ===
Judo has been a part of the Paralympics since 1988 in Seoul. Judo in the Paralympics for vision impaired athletes is very similar to judo for the able-bodied, however competitors are brought to a gripping position right at the start of the match, unlike with sighted competitors. It is organised under the same weight divisions as Olympic judo for the able-bodied.

Australia represented by:
Men – Anthony Clarke
Officials – Bruce Tatam (escort)

Australia did not win any medals.

=== Powerlifting ===
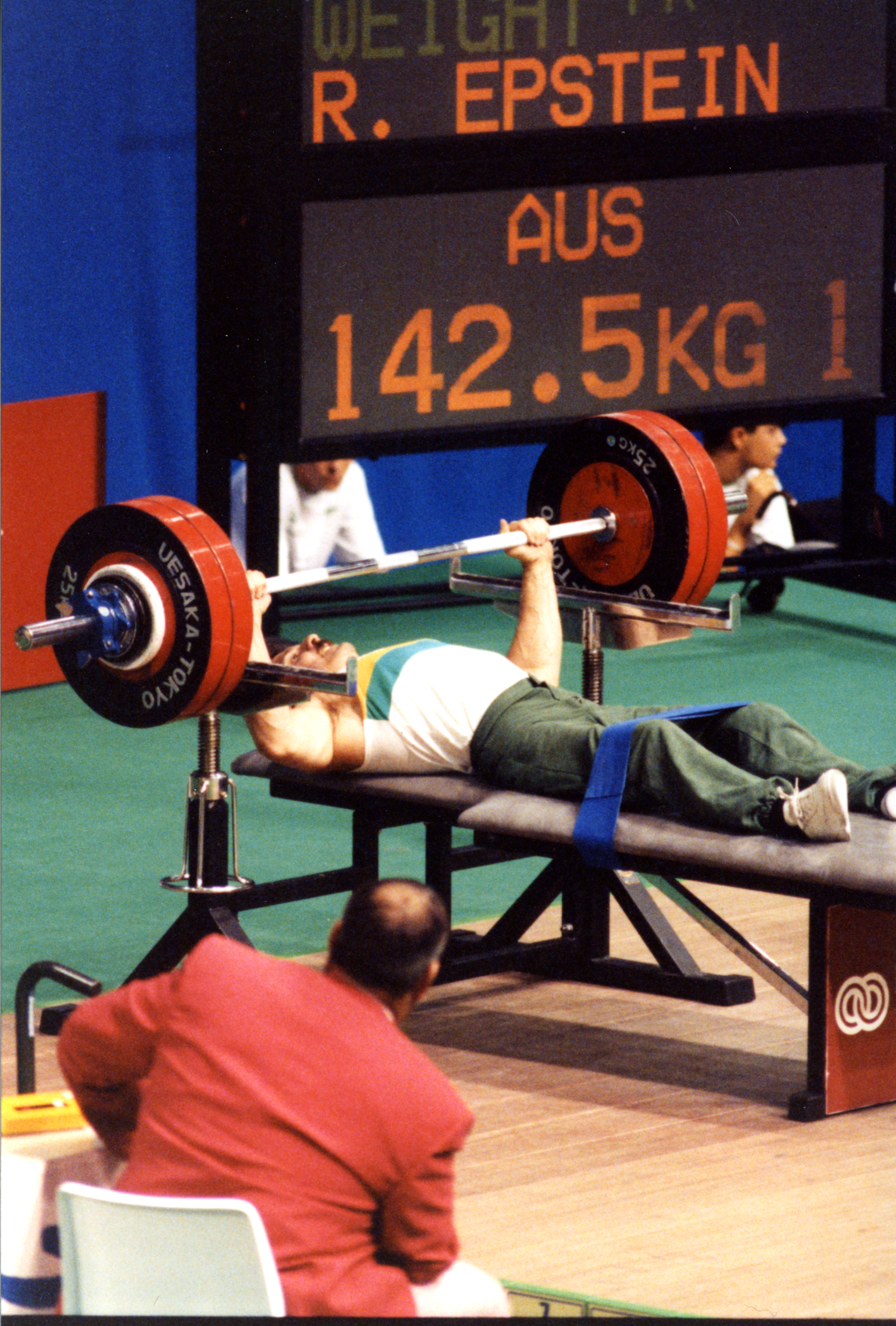
Ramon Epstein lifting at the 1992 Paralympic Games

The specific 'Powerlifting' event debuted at the 1992 Paralympics, after previously being known as 'weightlifting', and being limited to just men with spinal cord injuries, then evolving to include athletes with other disabilities and gaining rules identical to Powerlifting for able-bodied athletes. No women competed in the 1992 games, however 25 countries were involved in the competition. Powerlifting is a benchpress competition and includes 10 bodyweight divisions for each men and women.

Australia represented by:
Men – Ray Epstein, Brian McNicholl, Steve Green
Australia won a gold medal through the world-record-breaking performance of Brian McNicholl.

Athlete	Event	Result	Rank
Ray Epstein	Men's Up to 52 kg	142.5 kg	4
Steve Green	Men's Up to 75 kg	167.5 kg	4
Brian McNicholl	Men's Up to 90 kg	227.5 kg	(gold) WR

=== Shooting ===
Shooting has been a part of the Paralympics since the 1980 games. Both men and women can be involved in shooting at the Paralympics, with the sport open to amputees, les autres, cerebral palsy and wheelchair athletes able to complete in men's, women's, and mixed events. Rifle events that require prone, standing and kneeling positions are adapted for athletes with disabilities, and all pistol events are competed in from a standing position with only one hand able to hold the gun.

Australia represented by:
Men – Keith Bremner, Andrew Rambow
Women – Elizabeth Kosmala

Australia did not win any medals.

=== Swimming ===
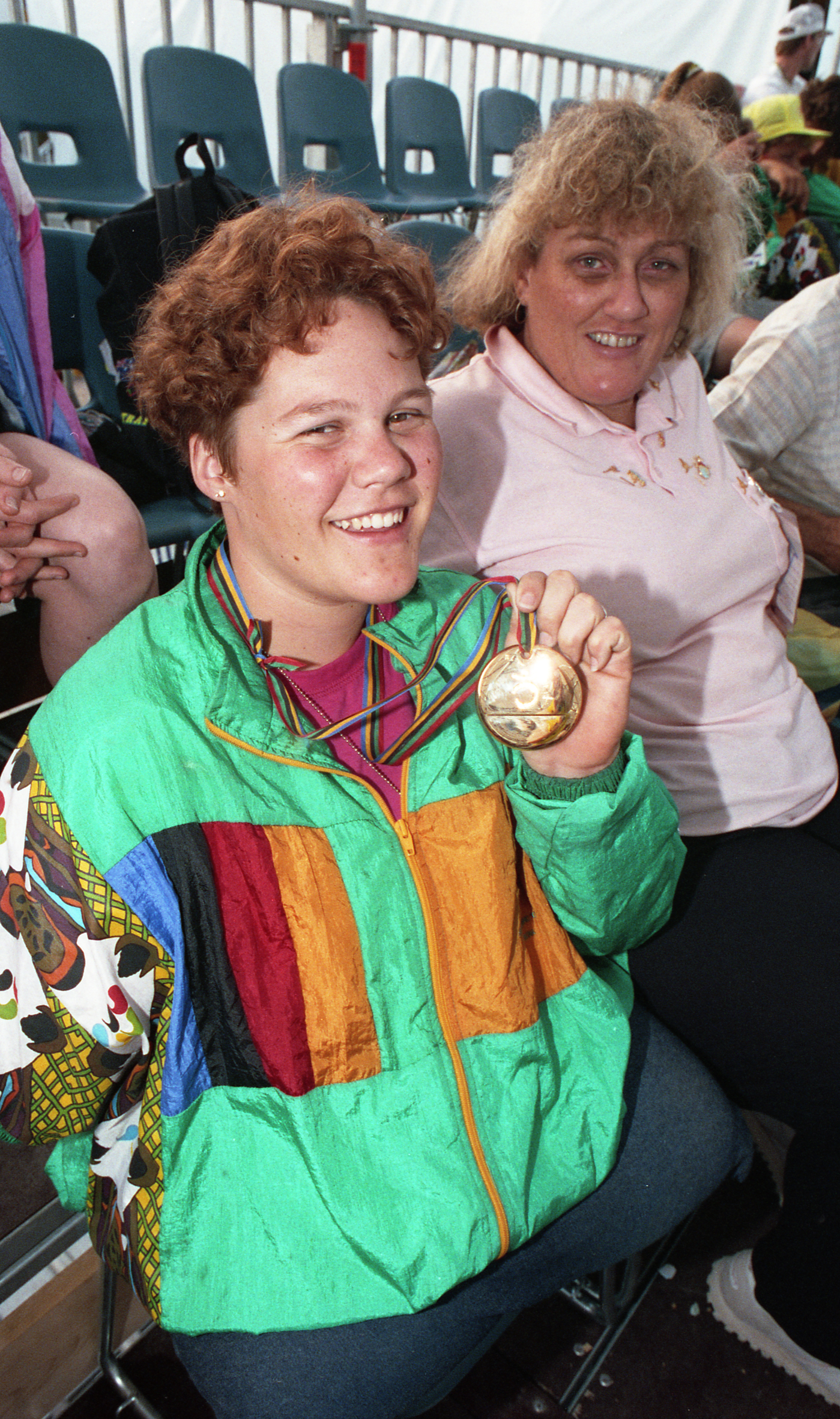
Tracy Lee Barrell holding Barcelona 1992 Paralympic medal

Paralympic swimming includes four different strokes, which are freestyle, backstroke, breastwork and butterfly, and distances range from 50m-400m. In all strokes except backstroke, swimmers have the option of starting from the blocks, beside the blocks, or in the water. Vision impaired swimmers are also permitted to be warned when they are close to the wall by a coach using a padded pole.

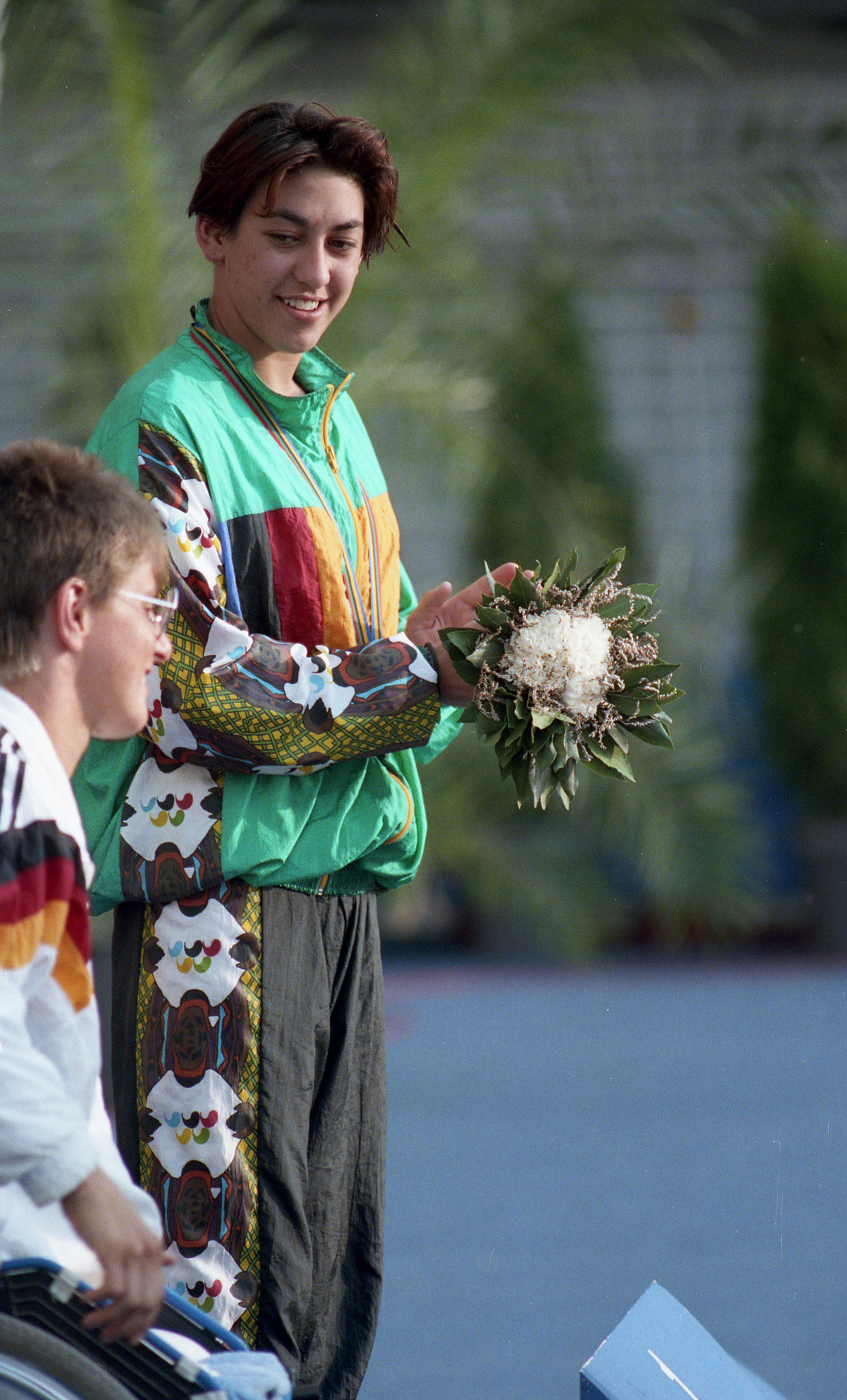
Triple gold medalist Priya Cooper standing on the gold medal podium

Australia represented by:
Men – Rodney Bonsack, Damien Bridger, Kingsley Bugarin, Brendan Burkett (swim captain), Jason Diederich, Bradley Evans, Paul Gockel, Simon Matthew Lee, Kieran Modra, Stephen Simmonds, David Smith, Phillip Tracey
Women – Kelly Barnes, Julie Barr, Tracy Barrell, Michelle Bate, Priya Cooper, Tracey Cross, Anne Currie, Catherine Huggett, Lyn Lillecrapp, Mandy Maywood, Tracey Oliver, Kirstyn Summerton, Danae Sweetapple, Sandra Yaxley, Judith Young
Coaches – Anne Green (Amputee), Phil Jose (Cerebral palsy), Kerry Smith (Cerebral palsy)
Officials – Ian McDowell-Jones (Vision impaired Manager), Rowenna Toppenberg (blind escort)

Australian swimmers won 35 medals – 10 gold, 12 silver and 13 bronze medals. 7 athletes won gold medals.

Notable performances – Priya Cooper was the most successful Australian athlete at the 1992 Paralympic games, earning herself three gold medals and two silver medals, only to go on to do even better in future games. One of the gold medals Priya won was for her swim in the 200m medley, setting a new world record with a finishing time of 3 min 18.53 sec.

Members of the Australian Women's 4x50m Freestyle S1–6 team Sandra Yaxley, Tracy Barrell, Catherine Huggett, and Anne Currie won a gold medal smashing the world record in a time of 3 min 26.50 sec, beating out Sweden and France.

Victorian Anne Currie shattered the world record in the 200m freestyle, taking nearly six seconds off the previously held record to finish in 3mins 11.14sec. This was Anne's third gold medal of the games.

Gold Medals

Athlete	Event	Result	Rank
Sandra Yaxley, Tracy Barrell, Catherine Huggett, Anne Currie	Women's 4x50 m Freestyle S1-6	3:26.56 WR	Gold medal
Tracey Cross	400m Freestyle B1	5:52.89	Gold medal
Priya Cooper	200m Individual Medley SM6-7	3:18.53 WR	Gold medal
Anne Currie	200m Freestyle S6	3:11.14 WR	Gold medal
Priya Cooper	100m Freestyle S8	1:17.70 PR	Gold medal
Anne Currie	100m Freestyle S6	1:31.39 WR	Gold medal
Tracey Cross	100m Freestyle B1	1:18.36	Gold medal
Mandy Maywood	100m Breaststroke B3	1:26.73	Gold medal
Priya Cooper	50m Freestyle S8	35.68 WR	Gold medal
Tracy Barrell	50m Butterfly S3-4	1:16.02 WR	Gold medal

Results key

WR = World record

PR = Paralympic record

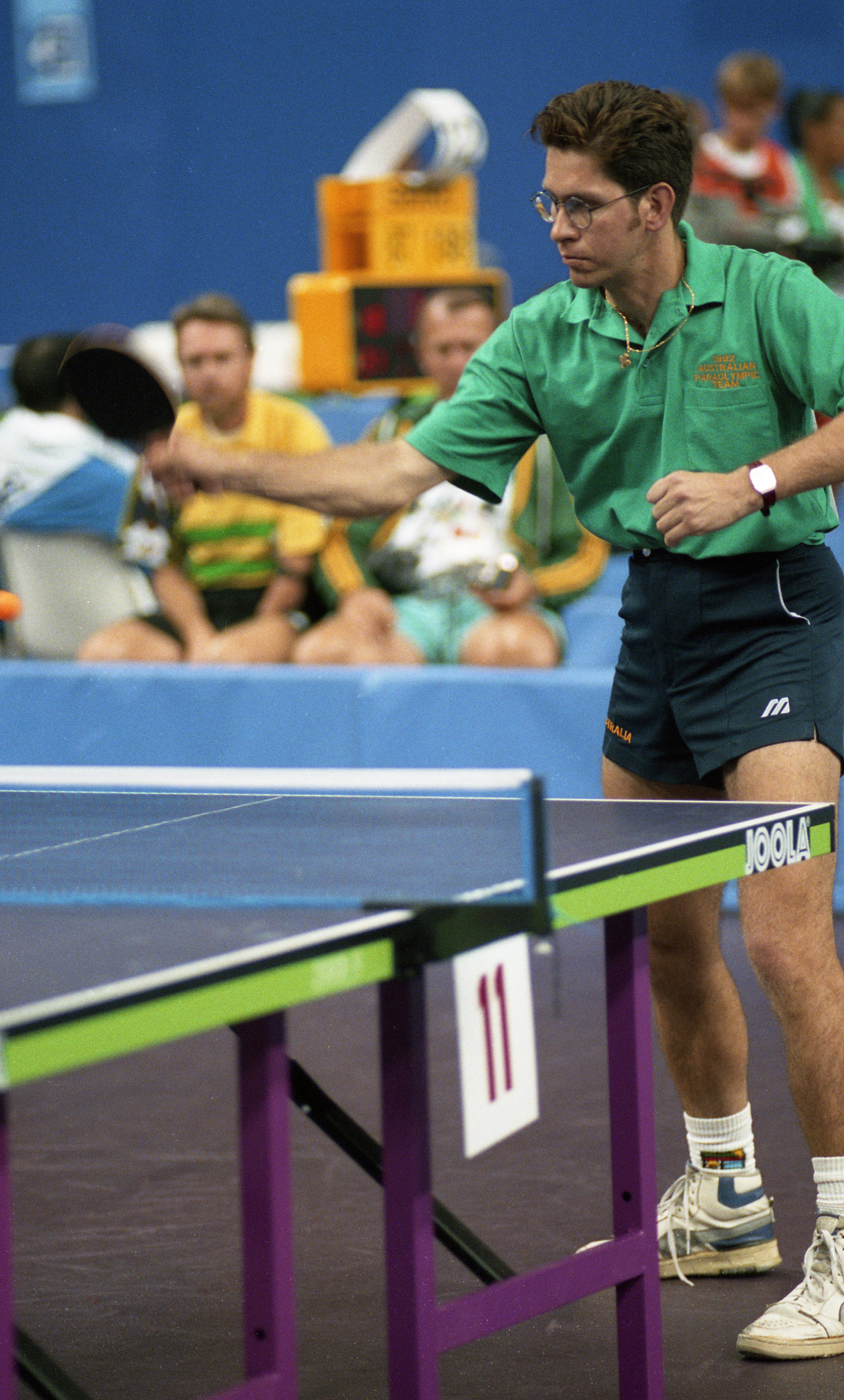
Australian table tennis player Csaba Bobary

=== Table tennis ===
Table tennis is a competition open to wheelchair, amputee, cerebral palsy, intellectual disability and les autres athletes, and is split into both singles and doubles. The game is played to exactly the same rules as able-bodied competitions for standing players, and there is only slight variation to the rules for wheelchair table tennis.

Australia represented by:
Men – Csaba Bobory

Australia won no medals.

=== Wheelchair basketball ===
Wheelchair basketball has been a part of the Paralympic Games since 1960, and sources indicate that it is one of the most popular wheelchair sports. The court, ring height and backboards are the same as the able-bodied game, with wheelchair basketball modelled after the able-bodied version. Players are classified with a points system that is based on their ability.

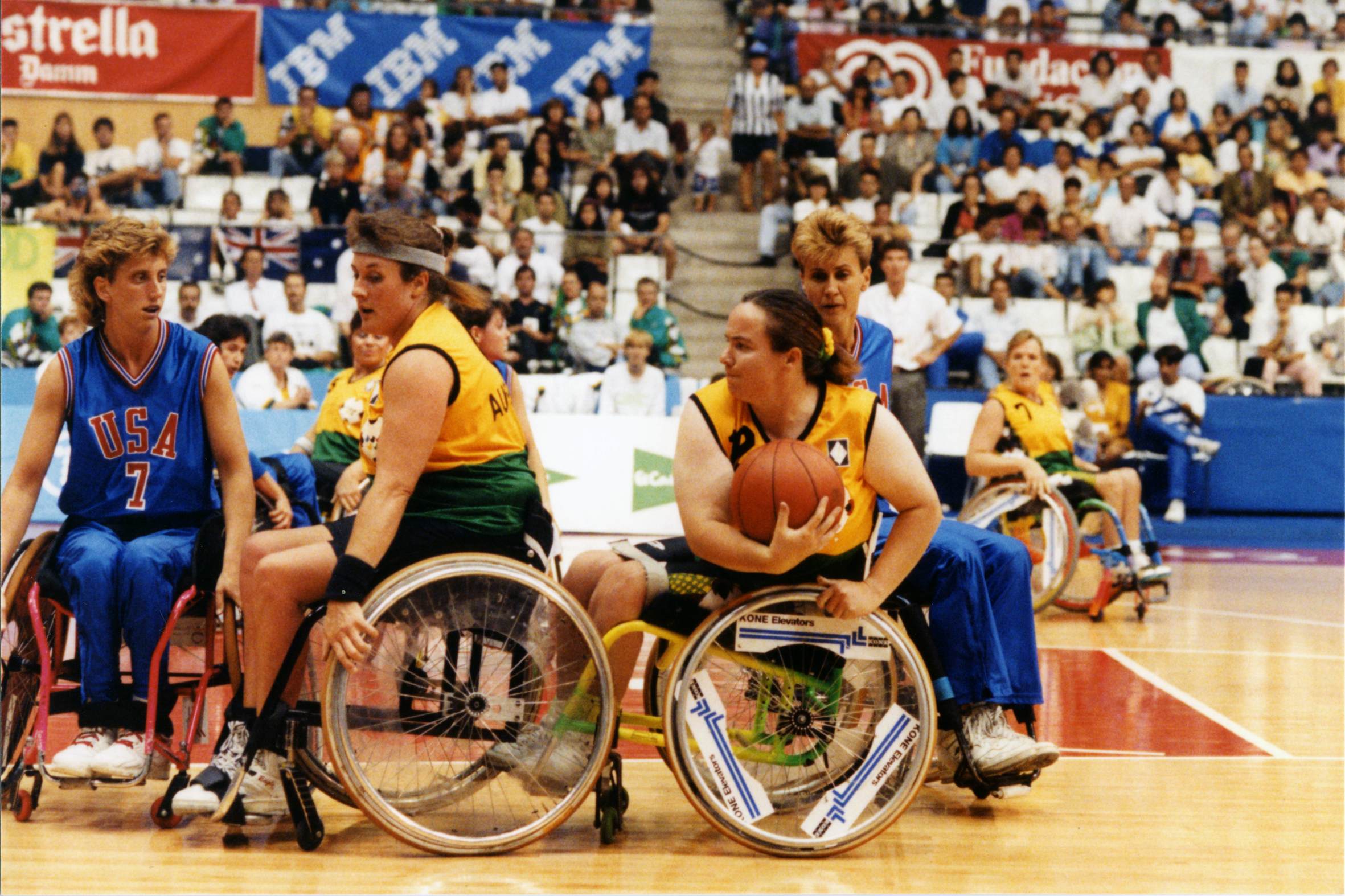
Action during a women's wheelchair basketball game between Australia and the United States

Australia represented by:
Men – Troy Andrews, Sandy Blythe, Michael Callahan, Stuart Ewin, David Gould, Gerry Hewson, Errol Hyde, Timothy Maloney, Richard Oliver, Troy Sachs, Stephen Trestrail, Michael Walker
Coach – Michael Tucker
Official – Graham Gould (escort)

Women – Amanda Carter, Coralie Churchett, Sue Hobbs, Paula Lohman, Lisa O'Nion, Donna Ritchie, Amanda Rose, Julie Russell, Sharon Slann, Liesl Tesch,
Coach – Peter Corr
Official – John Crossley (escort)

Australia won no medals.

=== Wheelchair fencing ===
Fencing in the Paralympics is only participated in by wheelchair athletes. The wheelchair is fixed to a wheelchair fencing frame during competition to improve safety and reduce likelihood of tipping, and to allow free upper body movement of the fencer.

Australia represented by:
Men – Robert Jordan

Australia won no medals.

=== Wheelchair tennis ===
Wheelchair tennis appeared as a demonstration sport at the 1988 Summer Paralympics, and after its success at the games it was admitted to the Paralympics at Barcelona 1992, where men's and women's singles and doubles were contested.

Draft constitution and planning documents for the new federation were circulated to the nations after considerable planning and consultation with the International Tennis Federation (ITF). At their annual general meeting, the ITF adopts the two bounce rule in the official Rules of Tennis, officially sanctioning the new sport.

Australia represented by:
Men – Mick Connell, David Hall
Women – Randa Hinson, Sue Twelftree

Notable performance – Mick Connell advancing to the final where he was beaten by Laurent Giammartini of France.

Athlete	Event	Round of 32	Round of 16	Quarterfinals	Semifinals	Final – Bronze Medal Match	Overall Rank
Athlete	Event	Opposition Result	Opposition Result	Opposition Result	Opposition Result	Opposition Result	Overall Rank
Mick Connell	Men's Singles	Paul Johnson (CAN) W 6–1, 6–0	Scott Douglas (USA) W 6–4, 6–0	Abde Naili (FRA) W 7–6, 6–4	Randy Snow (USA) L 7–6, 4–6, 3–6	Laurent Giammartini (FRA) L 1–6, 0–4	4

Australia won no medals.

== Funding ==
The funding for the Australian Paralympic team came from a number of stakeholders. Part funding of the Paralympic team was provided by Jim Fleming the founder of Franklins Supermarket. Jim agreed to support the team with the idea that athletes would visit local Franklin's supermarkets each Saturday morning to meet and greet members of the public. This allowed members of the community to get to know the athletes and follow their preparations leading up to the games. During the Paralympics, photographs of the athlete who visited a store were displayed that at the supermarket, and press releases were sent to the supermarkets allowing members of the community to track athletes' progress and achievements during the games.

The Australian Paralympic Federation received a $75,000 grant to help pay its way to the 1992 Paralympics in Barcelona.

The remaining $100,000 to fund the Australian Paralympic Team was provided by Australian Sports Commission under the Federal Minister for Sport Ros Kelly in 1992.

Radio played significant role for the 1992 Australian Paralympic team in the lead up to the games. Along with meet and greets, athletes participated in interviews talking about the upcoming Paralympics and media releases on ABC radio every Saturday morning. The ABC provided generous support to the athletes and did everything they could to make mention of the games during broadcasts. For example, they would promote the phone numbers needed for those wanting more information about the games. As a result of the coverage, listeners were phoning in and donating money in the lead up to the games. Donations were still being made during the games. Financial support was not the only benefit of the ABC's involvement, Australia importantly were understanding what a Paralympian was.

== Media coverage ==
"It's a great leap forward for the whole Paralympic and disabled sporting movement in Australia,"

— Kerry Cosgrove, Chairman of the Paralympic Federation

The media attention at the 1992 Paralympic Games was quite strong, with requests from 1300 members of the press for accreditation and 42 television channels being represented in Barcelona for the games. Whilst Australia did not have any live coverage of the games, highlight packages from the Games Broadcasting Authority were played every evening by the ABC during the 1992 Paralympics.

The chairman of the Paralympic Federation, Kerry Cosgrove, said the prime-time coverage was a real boost for the athletes and would hopefully encourage further sponsorship. "It's a great leap forward for the whole Paralympic and disabled sporting movement in Australia", he said.

== The Madrid Games ==
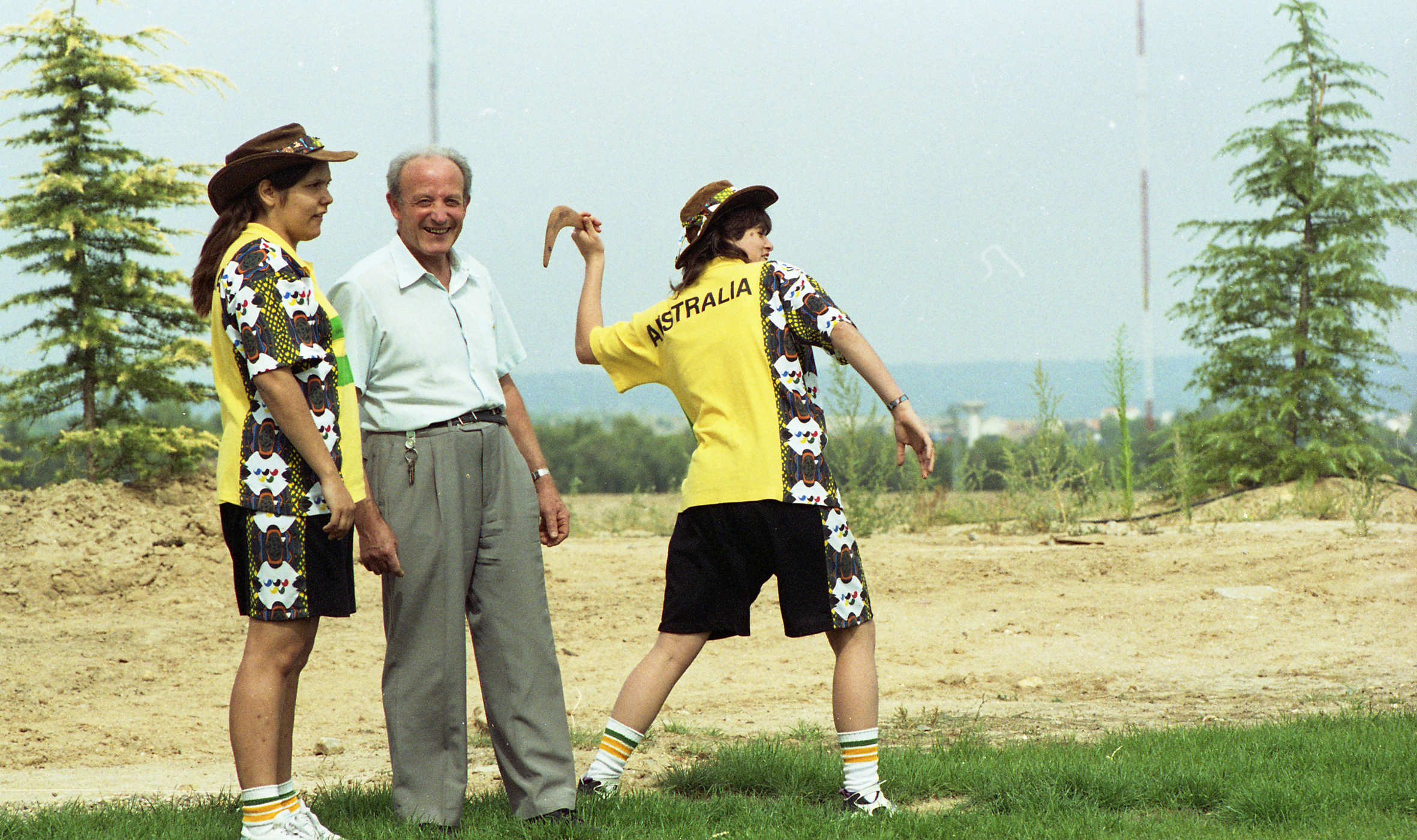
Indigenous basketballers Alice Toogood (South Australia) and Donna Burns (Victoria) demonstrate throwing the boomerang during a break in the 1992 Madrid Paralympic Games for Persons with Mental Handicap. Toogood and Burns were members of the Australian Pearls team which won the gold medal in Madrid.

The 1992 Paralympics was the first, and only year with a separate Paralympic Games with Persons with Mental Handicap. These games were held in Madrid and were sponsored by INAS-FMH, whilst still under ICC purview. The inclusion of athletes from the INAS-FMH was a complex issue, and after much back and forth between many organisations a request was made by the INAS-FMH. The president of the INAS-FMH, Mr Vicente, asked that the ICC sanction a games in a different location to Barcelona, but still under the Paralympic Flag. Voting in favour of this was unanimous and the games went ahead.
Athletes qualified according to qualifying standards that were set in advance, and the games were open, meaning that no classification took place. The events also did not have any adaptation to suit athletes with any particular disability. More than 70 countries with around 2500 athletes and officials in total were involved. This total number involvement was more than expected at the time, so there was some strain placed on the organisational side of the games, however the sporting events were a success and sources indicate that "Many nations would have drawn meaningful motivation from their involvement in this world event"

"The two gold medals joined a handsome collection from wins in the 100m freestyle, 200m freestyle, 100m butterfly, medley relay and 50m relay – four of which were achieved in world record times – and he still has two events to swim."

— The Canberra Times, of Joseph Walker, a 21-year-old swimmer at the Madrid Games.

Despite what has been said about the Madrid games being unifying and meaningful for many nations, other sources do indicate that the Madrid games are extremely rarely recognised as Paralympic Games, with even the IPC making no mention of the games, and no official results or medal lists available. However, it does seem that Australia was unaware of this exclusion, with news reports at the time indicating that Australia, as a whole, believed that these games were a true part of the Paralympics, and those that were succeeding by winning medals, were Paralympic Champions. The Canberra Times published a news article boasting the success of the Australian Paralympians at the Madrid games, showing that the Australian public was unaware of the coming controversy surrounding the lack of official recognition for these Athletes.
Australia came first in these games, finishing with a total of 32 medals: 13 gold, 10 silver and 8 bronze. The most notable performance for Australia was by the men's swimming team, and in particular, Joseph Walker, who won 9 medals in total, 5 individual and 4 relay. This was undoubtedly a great success for Australia, with many Athletes excelling at these games, and bringing home a real win for Australia.

== Political context ==
There was a great deal of controversy surrounding the 1992 Barcelona Paralympics, with much heated discussion taking place before the event. There had been considerations for a capitation fee to be charged to each of the athletes competing, however this was decided against and instead the INAS-FMH paid an overall capitation fee of US$10,000 to the ICC (International Coordinating Committee), which was very welcomed by the ICC treasurer. Furthermore, the medical treatment was offered for free for all athletes involved in the Summer Paralympics, and Michael Riding, the medical officer for the organising committee, was impressed. After visiting the medical facilities provided, he concluded that they were of a very high standard. On top of this, the ICC had to discuss and decide on the re-entry of South Africa to the international sporting fraternity. Whilst other organisations such as the IOC and the International Stoke Mandeville Games Federation had already agreed to re-submit South Africa, however the ICC had not yet considered this. There was certainly enough president for the ICC to allow this resubmission, however the Paralympic Planning Committee wanted to know whether they would be required to provide places for the South African Paralympic Athletes. This would have to be considered and agreed to by the international federations.

== Drugs and doping ==
Although doping offences were prevalent during the Barcelona Paralympics, no Australian athletes were involved.

== Homecoming ==
'Gold-medalled and starry eyed, I came home from Barcelona to the sort of public attention I had never dreamed of'

Louise Sauvage

The athletes were welcomed back with a ticker-tape parade down George St, Sydney, which was a wonderful boost for sports for athletes with a disability, helping to lift their profile. The attention and interest they created back home, were a turning point for our sports. After the games all gold medalists were awarded an Order of Australia Medal.

== See also ==
- Australia at the Paralympics
- Australia at the 1992 Paralympic Games for Persons with Mental Handicap
- Images of the Australian Team at the 1992 Summer Paralympics
