= Athletics at the 2004 Summer Paralympics – Women's discus throw F13 =

Women's Discus F13 at the XII Paralympic Games
- Venue: Athens Olympic Stadium
- Dates: 23 September 2004
- Competitors: 9 from 9 nations
- Winning distance: 44.56

Medalists
1st place, gold medalist(s)		Xu Hong Yan	China
2nd place, silver medalist(s)		Tamara Sivakova	Belarus
3rd place, bronze medalist(s)		Courtney Knight	Canada

The Women's discus throw F13 event for visually impaired athletes was held at the 2004 Summer Paralympics in the Athens Olympic Stadium on 23 September. It was won by Xu Hong Yan, representing China.

== Result ==
23 Sept. 2004, 17:00

Rank	Athlete	Result	Notes
1st place, gold medalist(s)	Xu Hong Yan (CHN)	44.56	
2nd place, silver medalist(s)	Tamara Sivakova (BLR)	41.32	
3rd place, bronze medalist(s)	Courtney Knight (CAN)	38.29	
4	Jodi Willis (AUS)	36.67	
5	Claire Williams (GBR)	35.26	
6	Mariela Almada (ARG)	35.20	
7	Siena Christen (GER)	34.90	
8	Jessica Castellano (ESP)	30.35	
	Liudys Masso (CUB)	NMR	
