= Anthony Head (disambiguation) =

Anthony Head (1954–2026) was an English actor.

Anthony or Tony Head may also refer to:

- Antony Head, 1st Viscount Head (1906–1983), British soldier, politician and diplomat
- Tony Head (athlete), Australian Paralympic athlete
- Tony Head (motorcyclist), competitor in the 1983 Grand Prix motorcycle racing season

== See also ==
- Anthony Heald
