= Athletics at the 2008 Summer Paralympics – Women's shot put F12–13 =

The Women's Shot Put F11-12 had its Final held on September 14 at 19:30.

== Medalists ==
Gold	Tang Hongxia; China
Silver	Tamara Sivakova; Belarus
Bronze	Jodi Willis-Roberts; Australia

== Results ==
Place	Athlete	Class	1	2	3	4	5	6	Best	Points
1	Tang Hongxia (CHN)	F12	10.70	11.08	12.10	12.69	12.14	x	12.69	1017
2	Tamara Sivakova (BLR)	F12	11.60	11.68	11.60	12.13	11.71	11.96	12.13	972
3	Jodi Willis-Roberts (AUS)	F12	x	11.03	11.19	11.21	11.11	10.17	11.21	898
4	Zhang Liangmin (CHN)	F12	10.40	10.53	10.78	10.91	10.47	10.76	10.91	874
5	Jessica Castellano (ESP)	F12	9.88	10.79	10.89	10.83	10.18	10.49	10.89	873
6	Elizabeth Almada (ARG)	F12	10.43	10.74	9.82	10.56	10.18	9.88	10.74	861
7	Siena Christen (GER)	F12	9.73	10.21	10.49	10.02	9.98	10.10	10.49	841
8	Dangute Skeriene (LTU)	F12	9.97	10.17	10.12	10.10	10.12	9.94	10.17	815
