= Athletics at the 2004 Summer Paralympics – Women's shot put F12 =

Women's Shot Put F12 at the XII Paralympic Games
- Venue: Athens Olympic Stadium
- Dates: 25 September 2004
- Competitors: 11 from 10 nations
- Winning distance: 12.82

Medalists
1st place, gold medalist(s)		Tamara Sivakova	Belarus
2nd place, silver medalist(s)		Xu Hong Yan	China
3rd place, bronze medalist(s)		Jodi Willis	Australia

The Women's shot put F12 event for visually impaired athletes was held at the 2004 Summer Paralympics in the Athens Olympic Stadium on 23 September. It was won by Tamara Sivakova, representing Belarus.

25 Sept. 2004, 09:30

Rank	Athlete	Result	Notes
1st place, gold medalist(s)	Tamara Sivakova (BLR)	12.82	PR
2nd place, silver medalist(s)	Xu Hong Yan (CHN)	12.35	
3rd place, bronze medalist(s)	Jodi Willis (AUS)	11.95	
4	Dangute Skeriene (LTU)	11.16	
5	Siena Christen (GER)	10.81	
6	Jessica Castellano (ESP)	10.51	
7	Zhang Liang Min (CHN)	10.12	
8	Mariela Almada (ARG)	9.81	
9	Marija Iveković (CRO)	9.31	
10	Alailupe Valeti (TGA)	7.48	
	Nirmala Gyawali (NEP)	NMR	
