= Tang Hongxia =

Chinese Paralympic athlete

Personal information
- Born: 18 August 1976 (age 50)

Sport
- Sport: Paralympic athletics
Medal record
Paralympic athletics
Representing China
Paralympic Games
Gold medal – first place	2008 Beijing	Shot put F12‒F13
Silver medal – second place	2012 London	Discus throw F11/12
Silver medal – second place	2012 London	Shot put F11/12
Silver medal – second place	2016 Rio de Janeiro	Discus throw F11
World Championships
Silver medal – second place	2015 Doha	Discus throw F11
Silver medal – second place	2017 London	Discus throw F11
Asian Para Games
Gold medal – first place	2010 Guangzhou	Discus throw F12
Silver medal – second place	2010 Guangzhou	Shot put F12
Silver medal – second place	2018 Jakarta	Discus throw F11

Tang Hongxia (Chinese: 汤红霞; pinyin: Tāng Hóngxiá; born August 18, 1976) is a Paralympian athlete from China competing mainly in category F12‒F13 shot put events.

She competed in the 2008 Summer Paralympics in Beijing, China. There she won a gold medal in the women's F12‒F13 shot put event and finished sixth in the F12‒F13 discus throw.

In the 2016 Summer Paralympics in Rio Zhang Liangmin took a gold medal in the discus after a throw of 36.65 metres. Tang threw 35.01 metres to take the silver and Izabela Campos took the bronze with a throw of 32.60 metres.
