= Xu Hong Yan =

Chinese Paralympic athlete

Medal record

Women's para-athletics

Representing China

Paralympic Games
Gold medal – first place	1996 Atlanta	Shot put F10-11
Gold medal – first place	2000 Sydney	Discus throw F12
Gold medal – first place	2004 Athens	Discus throw F13
Silver medal – second place	1996 Atlanta	Discus throw F10-11
Silver medal – second place	2000 Sydney	Shot put F12
Silver medal – second place	2004 Athens	Shot put F12

Xu Hong Yan is a paralympic athlete from China competing mainly in category F12 shot put and discus events.

She competed in three consecutive paralympics games, winning medals each time. She first appeared in 1996 Summer Paralympics where she made her only appearance in the javelin and won a silver in the Discus and gold in the shot put. The following games in Sydney in 2000 Summer Paralympics Hong Yan reversed her medals winning the gold medal in the discus and silver in the shot put. This was a performance she repeated in her last games in 2004 Summer Paralympics where she again won silver in the shot and gold in the discus.
