= Sandra Yaxley =

Australian Paralympic swimmer

Sandra Yaxley OAM
Personal information
- Full name: Sandra Yaxley
- Nationality: Australia
- Born: 1968 (age 57–58)
Medal record
Swimming
Paralympic Games
Gold medal – first place	1988 Seoul	Women's 100 m Freestyle C6
Gold medal – first place	1992 Barcelona	Women's 4x50 m Freestyle S1–6
Silver medal – second place	1988 Seoul	Women's 50 m Backstroke C6
Bronze medal – third place	1992 Barcelona	Women's 100 m Freestyle S6

Sandra Yaxley is a cerebral palsy Australian Paralympic swimmer. At the 1988 Seoul Games, she won a gold medal in the Women's 100 m Freestyle C6 and a silver medal in the Women's 50 m Backstroke C6. At the 1992 Barcelona Games, she won a gold medal in the Women's 4x50 m Freestyle S1–6 event and a bronze medal in the Women's 100 m Freestyle S6 event. She retired from swimming after the 1992 Paralympics but took up coaching disabled and able-bodied swimmers. She was coached by Wayne De Lacy.

Yaxley was originally from Tasmania and moved to Perth, Western Australia at an early age. She began swimming when she was four as a form of rehabilitation. She attended Swanbourne Senior High School. In 2000, she was awarded the Australian Sports Medal and in 2013 inducted into Swimming Western Australia Hall of Fame at the age of 44.

Yaxley's motto is "Let me try and, if I can't do it, I'll know, but if I can do it, then watch out world."
