= Allan Butler =

Australian Paralympic athlete (born 1976)

Personal information
- Full name: Allan Robert Butler
- Nationality: Australia
- Born: 1976 (age 49–50)
Medal record
Athletics
Paralympic Games
Gold medal – first place	1992 Barcelona	Men's 4x100 m Relay TS2,4

Allan Robert Butler, OAM (born 1976) from Tumut, New South Wales is an Australian Paralympic athlete. In 1993, Butler moved to Canberra to take up a residential scholarship at the Australian Institute of Sport.

He won a gold medal at the 1992 Barcelona Games in the Men's 4 × 100 m Relay TS2,4 event. He also competed in the Men's 100 m TS4, Men's 200 m TS4 and Men's 400 m TS4 but did not medal.

Butler continues to be involved in Little Athletics in Tumut.
