= George Dunstan =

Australian sports administrator

George Dunstan AM
- Born: George Colliver Dunstan; 12 May 1938 (age 87)
- Occupation: sports administrator
- Known for: development of Paralympic sport in Australia

George Colliver Dunstan, AM (born 12 May 1938) is an Australian sports administrator who has played a leading role in the development of Paralympic sport in Australia particularly in terms of sport administration.

== Personal ==
Dunstan was born in Sydney on 12 May 1938. He trained as a physical educator. In 1975, he was appointed Head Physical Educator at the Hampstead Rehabilitation Centre, Royal Adelaide Hospital. During his career, he has encouraged many disabled people, particularly those with spinal injuries, to become involved in sport.

== Paralympic Games ==
Dunstan was Australian Team Manager at the 1980 Arnhem Games and 1984 Stoke Mandeville Games. At the 1988 Seoul Games, he was the Australian Team Manager of the Wheelchair Sports Section. He was the Chef de Mission for the Australian Team at the 1992 Barcelona and 1996 Atlanta Games. He was a Board Member of the Organising Committee for the 2000 Sydney Paralympics.

== FESPIC Games ==
Dunstan was Australian Team Manager at the 1977 and 1986 FESPIC Games. From 1989 to 2002, he was the International Paralympic Committee South Pacific Representative on FESPIC. He was Vice-President of the Sports Committee of FESPIC from 1984 to 2000. He was the FESPIC 2006 Kuala Lumpur Games Liaison Committee Chairman from 2002 to 2006, and was awarded the FESPIC Order in the latter year.

== Australian and International Disability Sports Organisations ==
Dunstan has been involved in an administrative capacity with several Australian disability sport organisations. He was Technical Advisor at the 1st Australian Wheelchair Games held in Melbourne in 1985. He was an Australian Paralympic Committee board member from 1992 to 1996. He has been a board member of the Australian Wheelchair Sports Federation and Wheelchair Sports Association of South Australia.

== Recognition ==
Dunstan has received the following honours in recognition of his work for disability sport and sports administration:

- 1990 – Sir Ludwig Guttman Award which recognises individuals who make significant contribution to Wheelchair Sport in Australia.
- 1997 – Member of the Order of Australia (AM)
- 2000 – Para Quad Association South Australia President's Award
- 2000 – Australian Sports Medal
- 2001 - Paralympic Order
- 2006 - FESPIC Order
