= Danae Sweetapple =

Australian Paralympic swimmer

Personal information
- Nationality: Australia
Medal record
Swimming
Paralympic Games
Silver medal – second place	1992 Barcelona	Women's 100 m Freestyle B2
Bronze medal – third place	1992 Barcelona	Women's 100 m Backstroke B2
Bronze medal – third place	1992 Barcelona	Women's 50 m Freestyle B2

Danae Suzanna Sweetapple is an Australian Paralympic swimmer. She was born in the Queensland town of St George. Sweetapple attended boarding school at 11 and has a Bachelor of Arts in Literature.

She took up swimming in 1990. Her early swimming results led to her being offered one of the first Australian Institute of Sport scholarships for disabled swimmers. At the 1992 Barcelona Games, she won a silver medal in the Women's 100 m Freestyle B2 event and she won two bronze medals in the Women's 100 m Backstroke B2 and Women's 50 m Freestyle B2 events. After the Games she commented "I'd be so happy if more people could make movement and sport a way of life. It's a great way to meet people and gain confidence."

Sweetapple was the Young Queenslander of the Year in 1992.
