= Marsha Green =

Australian Paralympic athlete (born 1975)

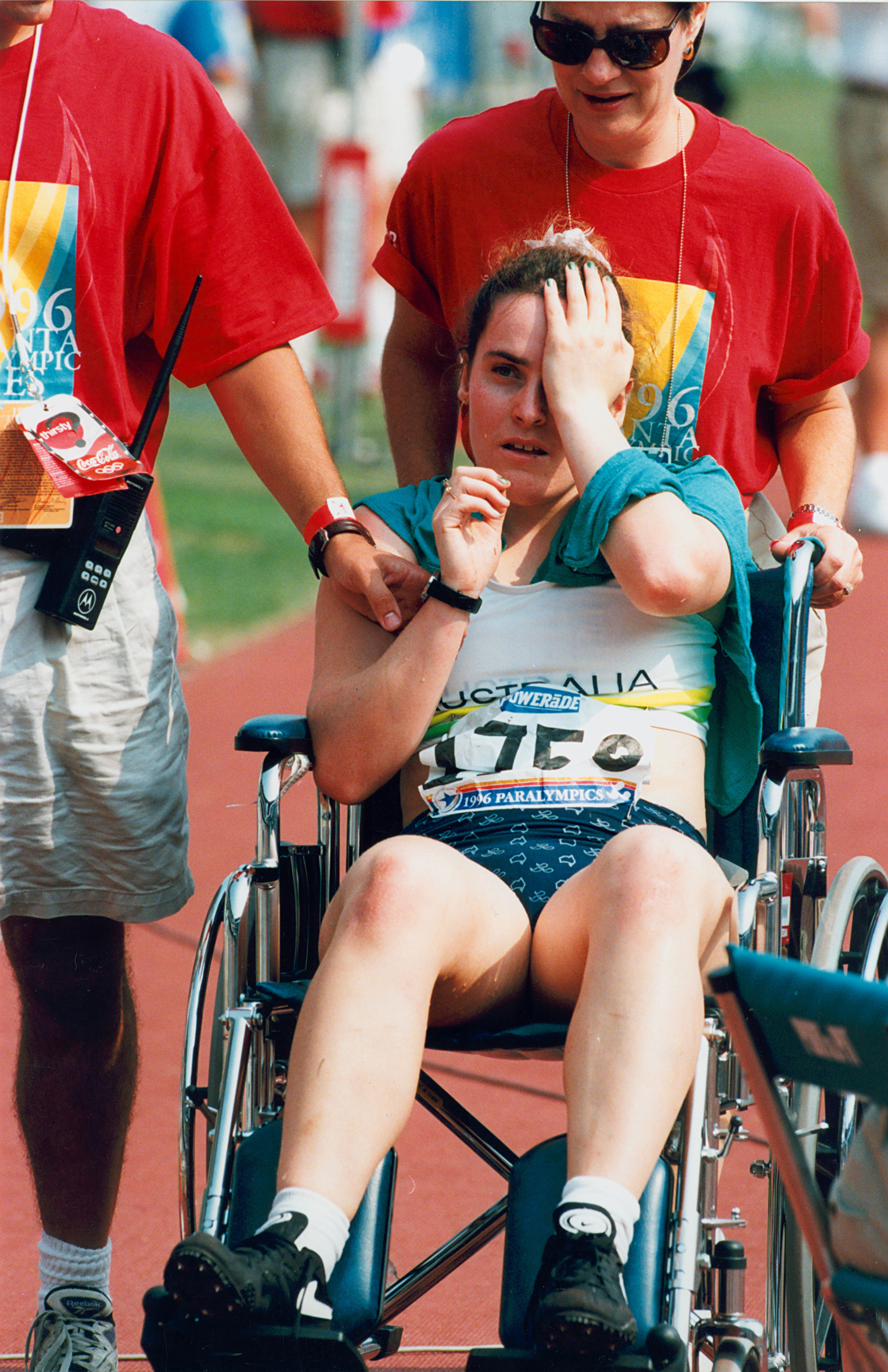
- Australian athlete Marsha Green is assisted from the track at the 1996 Atlanta Paralympic Games

Personal information
- Nationality: Australia
- Born: 26 July 1975 (age 50) Sydney, New South Wales
Medal record
Women's para athletics
Representing Australia
Paralympic Games
Silver medal – second place	1992 Barcelona	200 m B2
Bronze medal – third place	1992 Barcelona	400 m B2
World Championships
Silver medal – second place	1994 Berlin	100 m T11
Silver medal – second place	1994 Berlin	200 m T11
Silver medal – second place	1994 Berlin	400 m T11

Marsha Green (born 26 July 1975) in Sydney, New South Wales is an Australian Paralympic athlete with a vision impairment. She won a silver medal and bronze medal at the 1992 Barcelona Paralympics.

At the 1992 Barcelona Paralympics, she competed in four events and won a silver medal in the Women's 200 m B2 and a bronze medal in the Women's 400 m. Competing at the 1994 IPC Athletics World Championships, she won three silver medals - 100m, 200 and 400m T11 events. At the 1996 Atlanta Paralympics, she finished seventh in the Women's 200 m T11 and sixth in the Women's 400 m T11.
