= Tamara Sivakova =

Belarusian Paralympic athlete

Medal record

Paralympic athletics

Representing Unified Team

Paralympic Games
Gold medal – first place	1992 Barcelona	Pentathlon B3

Representing Belarus

Paralympic Games
Gold medal – first place	1996 Atlanta	Shot put F12
Gold medal – first place	2004 Athens	Shot put F12
Gold medal – first place	2008 Beijing	Discus throw F12-13
Silver medal – second place	2000 Sydney	Shot put F12-13
Silver medal – second place	2004 Athens	Shot put F12
Silver medal – second place	2008 Beijing	Shot put F12-13
Bronze medal – third place	1996 Atlanta	Shot put F12-13

IPC Athletics European Championships
Gold medal – first place	2012 Stadskanaal	Discus F11/12
Silver medal – second place	2016 Grosseto	Shot put F12

Tamara Sivakova (Belarusian: Тамара Сівакова) (born 16 August 1965) is a Paralympian athlete from Belarus competing mainly in the throwing events.

She first competed in the 1992 Summer Paralympics in Barcelona, Spain for the Unified Team there she won a gold medal in the discus throw for category B3 athletes and finished 5th in the pentathlon.

Four years later she competed in the 1996 Summer Paralympics in Atlanta, United States for Belarus. Here she won a gold in the shot put F12 and a bronze in the discus F12 but again failed to medal in the pentathlon.

She competed at her third games in Sydney, Australia in 2000 where she won the silver medal in the F13 discus and failed to medal in the pentathlon.

In 2004 in Athens, Greece she finished as winner of the gold medal in the F12 shot put and silver medal in the F13 discus throw She competed at her fifth Paralympics in 2008 in Beijing, China where she reversed her results of the previous games, winning the gold medal in the F12/13 discus throw and the silver medal in the F12/13 shot put.
