= Stephen Simmonds (swimmer) =

Personal information
- Nationality: Australia
Medal record
Swimming
Paralympic Games
Bronze medal – third place	1992 Barcelona	Men's 200 m Medley SM10

Stephen Leslie Simmonds is an Australian Paralympic swimmer and disabled waterskiing world champion. In February 1982, at the age of six, his right leg was amputated below the knee after a car knocked him off his bike. After the accident, he took up BMX riding, football, basketball, gymnastics and competitive swimming. He attended St Edmund's College, Canberra. At the age of twelve, he was the first student with a disability to compete at the Australian Primary Schools Championships. At the 1989 FESPIC Games in Kobe, Japan, he won a gold medal, two silver medals and a bronze medal in swimming events. He did not win a medal at the 1990 World Championships and Games for the Disabled in Assen, Netherlands.

He won a bronze medal at the 1992 Barcelona Games in the Men's 200 m Medley SM10 event; He also competed in the Men’s 50 m Freestyle, Men’s 100 m Freestyle, Men’s 100 m Butterfly S10, Men's 4x100 m, Freestyle S7–10 and Men's 4x100 m Medley S7–10 events.

At the age of eleven, he started water skiing. At the 1993 World Disabled Water Skiing Championships in France he won four gold medals and broke three world records and named Overall Men’s World Champion. He was the first disabled person to perform a flip. He continues to water ski at a competitive level.. He won 25 medals at the Paralympics

He had an Australian Institute of Sport Athletes with a Disability scholarship from 1993 to 1995 and in 1997. In 2000, he received an Australian Sports Medal for his skiing achievements.

He is married to Fiona, and has two daughters. He has walked the Kokoda Track. He works as an electrical contractor.
