= Karl Feifar =

Australian Paralympic athlete

Personal information
- Full name: Karl Peter Thomas Feifar
- Nationality: Australia
- Born: 5 January 1973 Subiaco, Western Australia
- Died: 29 May 2009 (aged 36) Orelia, Western Australia
Medal record
Athletics
Paralympic Games
Gold medal – first place	1992 Barcelona Paralympic Games	Men's 4x100 m Relay TS2,4
Silver medal – second place	1992 Barcelona	Men's Long Jump J2
World Championships and Games for the Disabled
Gold medal – first place	1990 Assen	Men's Long Jump 7F
Gold medal – first place	1990 Assen	Men's Javelin 7F
Gold medal – first place	1990 Assen	Men's Pentathlon
Gold medal – first place	1990 Assen	Men's 4x100m Relay 3T
Gold medal – first place	1990 Assen	Men's 4x400m Relay 4T
Silver medal – second place	1990 Assen	Men's 100m 4T
Silver medal – second place	1990 Assen	Men's 200m 4T

Karl Peter Thomas Feifar, OAM (5 January 1973 – 29 May 2009) was an indigenous Australian amputee athlete and Paralympic competitor.

== Personal ==
Feifar was born in the Perth suburb of Subiaco in 1973. His parents were Wendy and Peter. His deformed foot was amputated at birth. His parents encouraged him to play sport. Feifar commented Even as a kid, if I fell down, my mother would tell me to pick myself up and keep going. My parents gave me the positive will to succeed. Despite his below-knee amputation, as a child he played Australian football for Central Club in Jarrahdale, swam and competed in athletics with the aid of a prosthetic leg. He had worked for Australia Post as a driver. He had a partner, Kathleen, and a daughter.

== Career ==
At the 1988 Pan Pacific School Games in Sydney, Feifar won three gold and one bronze medals. In 1990, he set a world record and four Australian records at the Australian Amputee Games.

At the 1990 World Championships and Games for the Disabled in Assen Netherlands, he won five gold and two silver medals and broke two world records (long jump and pentathlon). After these Championships, he accepted a scholarship in the newly established Australian Institute of Sport Athletes with a Disabilities program and was coached by Chris Nunn.

At the 1992 Barcelona Games, he won a gold medal in the Men's 4 × 100 m Relay TS2,4 event and a silver medal in the Men's Long Jump J2 event. In 1993, he retired from competition. His coach Chris Nunn was quoted as saying: "Karl was extremely talented but due to early retirement he didn't realise his full potential".

== Death ==
Feifar died of a heart attack on 29 May 2009. His partner Kathleen could not connect to the 000 emergency number from her Telstra home phone in Orelia, and was forced to use her work mobile phone. There was an appeal to help pay for his burial in the Fremantle Cemetery.

== Recognition ==
- Member of the Aboriginal and Islander Sports Hall of Fame.
- 1990 – Young Aboriginal Athlete of the Year
- 1991 – National Sportsman of the Year at the National Aboriginal and Torres Strait Islander Sports Awards.
- 1992 – Medal of the Order of Australia after his 1992 gold medal.
