= Tracey Cross =

Australian Paralympic swimmer

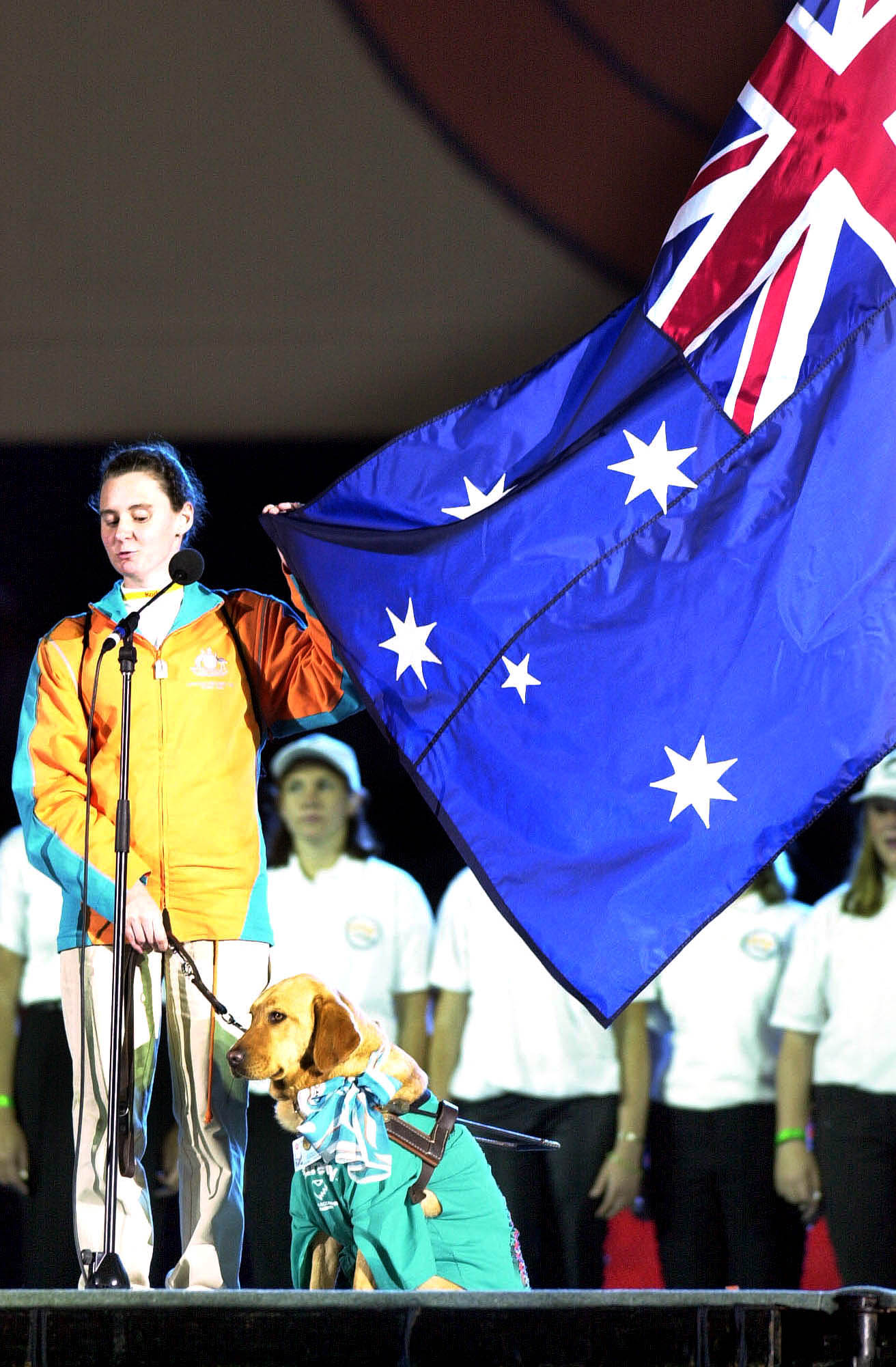
- Cross takes the official Athletes Oath at the 2000 Summer Paralympics Opening Ceremony

Personal information
- Full name: Tracey Nicole Cross
- Nationality: Australia
- Born: 4 December 1972 (age 53) Bunbury, Western Australia
Medal record
Swimming
Paralympic Games
Gold medal – first place	1992 Barcelona	Women's 100 m Freestyle B1
Gold medal – first place	1992 Barcelona	Women's 400 m Freestyle B1
Gold medal – first place	1996 Atlanta	Women's 100 m Butterfly B1
Gold medal – first place	1996 Atlanta	Women's 200 m Medley B1
Silver medal – second place	1992 Barcelona	Women's 100 m Backstroke B1
Silver medal – second place	1992 Barcelona	Women's 200 m Medley B1
Silver medal – second place	1996 Atlanta	Women's 50 m Freestyle B1
Silver medal – second place	2000 Sydney	Women's 100 m Freestyle S11
Silver medal – second place	2000 Sydney	Women's 400 m Freestyle S11
Bronze medal – third place	2000 Sydney	Women's 50 m Freestyle S11
IPC Swimming World Championships
Gold medal – first place	1994 Valletta	100 m Freestyle S11
Silver medal – second place	1994 Valletta	50 m Freestyle S11
Silver medal – second place	1994 Valletta	400 m Freestyle S11
World Championships and Games for the Disabled
Gold medal – first place	1990 Assen	Women's 400 m Freestyle B1
Bronze medal – third place	1990 Assen	Women's 100 m Freestyle B1

Tracey Nicole Cross, OAM (born 4 December 1972) is an Australian visually impaired swimmer. She won ten medals at three Paralympics, from 1992 to 2000.

== Personal ==
Cross was born in the Western Australian city of Bunbury on 4 December 1972. She has been blind since birth; in a 2000 interview, she said that the light perception that she had in one eye was "almost useless". She was left out of sporting activities at school and started swimming at the age of 15. Taking the sport casually at first, she became more serious about swimming when she found that she had a natural aptitude for it.

In 1994, she obtained a law degree from Murdoch University. After working in that field for some years, she became a massage therapist; she works in a natural health clinic in West Perth. Cross developed her passion for massage after she sustained a neck and shoulder injury while training for the 2000 Sydney Paralympics.

== Swimming career ==
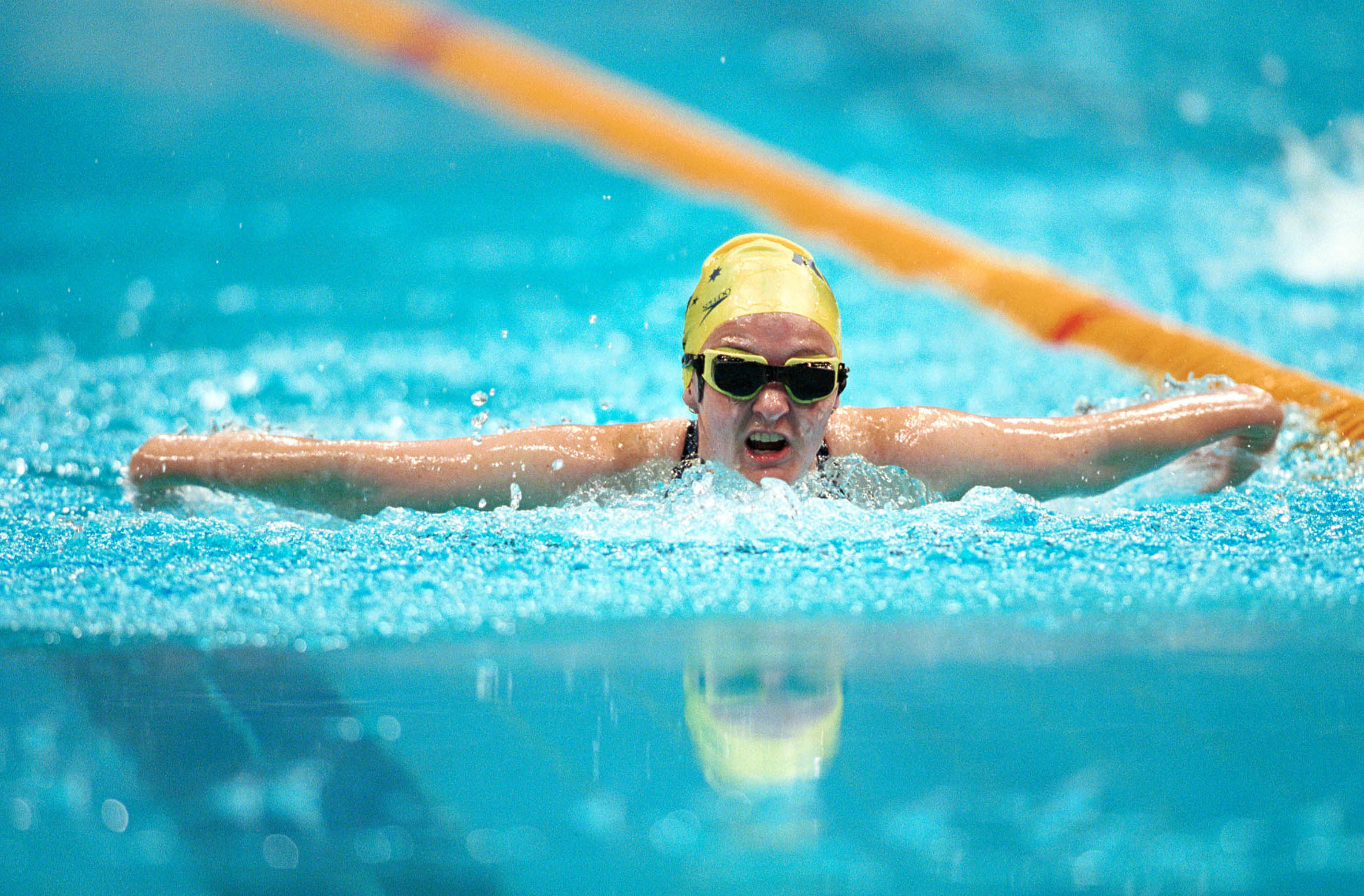
Action shot of Cross in the pool during competition at the 2000 Summer Paralympics

Cross won her first international gold medal in the women's 400 m Freestyle B1 at the 1990 World Championships and Games for the Disabled in Assen, Netherlands.

At the 1992 Barcelona Games, she won two gold medals in the Women's 100 m Freestyle B1 and Women's 400 m Freestyle B1 events, and two silver medals in the Women's 100 m Backstroke B1 and Women's 200 m Medley B1 events; she also came fourth in both the Women's 100 m Butterfly B1 and Women's 50 m Freestyle B1 events.

She won two gold medals at the 1996 Atlanta Games in the Women's 100 m Butterfly B1 and the Women's 200 m Medley B1 events, and a silver medal in the Women's 50 m Freestyle B1 event; she also came fifth in the Women's 100 m Backstroke B1 event and came seventh in the heats of the Women's 400 m Freestyle B2 event.

She spoke the Paralympic oath at the opening ceremony of the 2000 Sydney Paralympics. In the competition, she received two silver medals in the Women's 100 m Freestyle S11 and the Women's 400 m Freestyle S11 events, and a bronze medal in the Women's 50 m Freestyle S11 event; she also came fifth in the Women's 200 m Medley SM11 event and eighth in the Women's 100 m Backstroke S11 event.

== Recognition ==
In 1993, Cross received a Medal of the Order of Australia for her 1992 Paralympic gold medals. In that year, she also received the Western Australian Citizen of the Year Award in the Youth category. On 14 November 2000, she received an Australian Sports Medal "For Service to Sport as a gold Medallist at the Paralympic Games". She received a Centenary Medal on 1 January 2001 "For service to the community through Paralympic swimming". In 2009, she was inducted into the Swimming Western Australia Hall of Fame.
