= Alison Quinn =

Australian Paralympic athlete

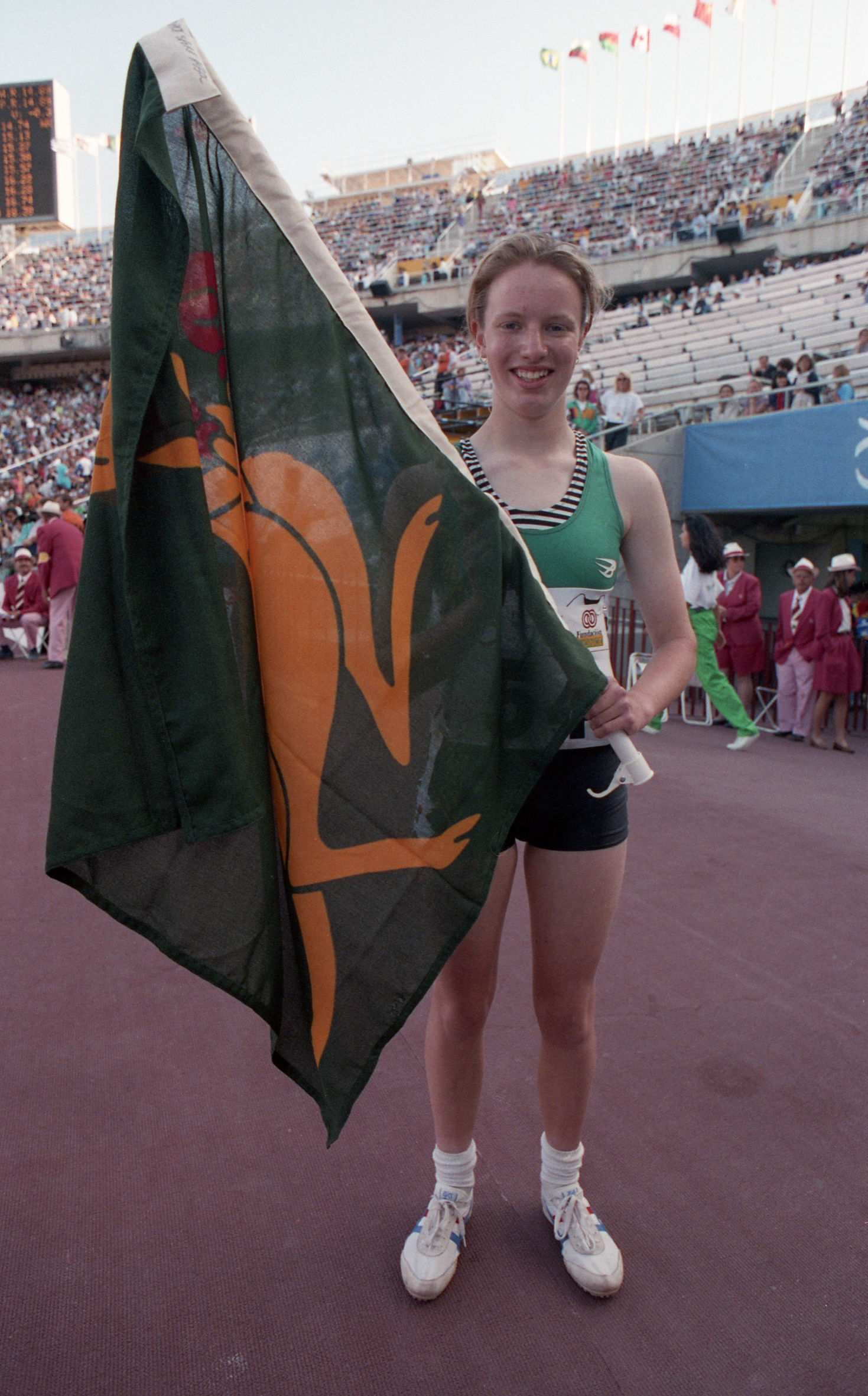
- Australian track and field athlete Alison Quinn holding the boxing kangaroo flag at the Barcelona 1992 Paralympic Games.

Personal information
- Full name: Alison Clare Quinn
- Nationality: Australian
- Born: 21 April 1977 (age 49) Manly, New South Wales
Medal record
Women's para athletics
Representing Australia
Paralympic Games
Gold medal – first place	1992 Barcelona	100 m C7–8
Gold medal – first place	1992 Barcelona	200 m C7–8
Gold medal – first place	2000 Sydney	100 m T38
Silver medal – second place	2000 Sydney	200 m T38
Bronze medal – third place	1996 Atlanta	100 m T36–37
World Championships
Gold medal – first place	1994 Berlin	100 M T37
Gold medal – first place	1994 Berlin	200 M T37
Gold medal – first place	1994 Berlin	Long jump F37
Gold medal – first place	1998 Birmingham	100 M T38
Silver medal – second place	1998 Birmingham	200 M T38

Alison Clare Quinn, OAM (born 21 April 1977) is an Australian Paralympic athlete who won five medals at three Paralympics from 1992 to 2000.

== Personal ==
Quinn was born in the Sydney suburb of Manly with cerebral palsy; she has hemiplegia on the left side of her body. She became involved in gymnastics to increase coordination and symmetry when she was two years old. She now trains in various sports including swimming, weights, and track work at the Sydney Academy of Sport. Quinn is employed as a part-time gymnastic coach and a motivational speaker, who is committed to increasing awareness of disabled sport in the community.

== Competitive career ==
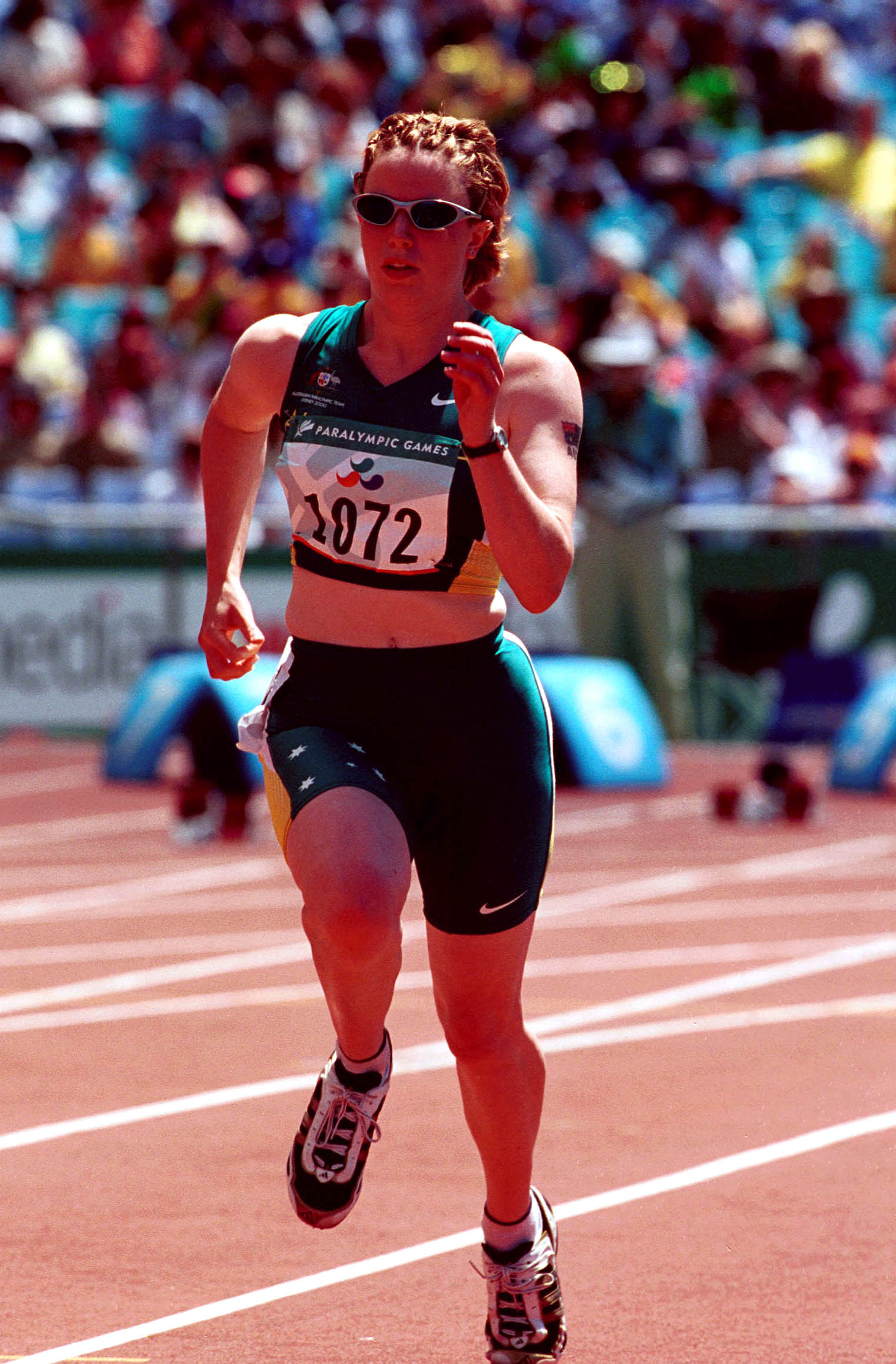
Quinn during her gold medal-winning run in the 100 m T38 race at the 2000 Summer Paralympics

=== Paralympic Games ===
Quinn won two gold medals at the 1992 Barcelona Games in the Women's 100 m C7–8 and Women's 200 m C7–8 events, for which she received a Medal of the Order of Australia. At the 1996 Atlanta Games, she won a bronze medal in the Women's 100 m T36–37 event. She won a gold medal with a world record time at the 2000 Sydney Games in the women's 100 m T38 event and a silver medal in the women's 200 m T38 event.

=== IPC World Championships ===
At the 1994 IPC Athletics World Championships in Berlin, Quinn won gold medals in the Women's 100 m T37 and 200 m T37 and Long Jump F37. She also came fourth in the Women's Javelin F37. At the 1998 IPC Athletics World Championships in Birmingham, she won gold medal in the Women's 100 m T38 and silver medal in the 200 m T38.

In 2000 Quinn received an Australian Sports Medal in recognition of her performance at the Paralympics and her two world records. Quinn was trained by Jackie Byrnes who was a national level athlete in the 1960s.
