= Kelly Barnes =

Australian Paralympic swimmer

Personal information
- Nickname: kel
- Nationality: Australia
Medal record
Swimming
Paralympic Games
Silver medal – second place	1992 Barcelona	Women's 100 m Butterfly S9
Silver medal – second place	1992 Barcelona	Women's 200 m Medley SM9
IPC Swimming World Championships
Gold medal – first place	1994 Valletta	100 m Butterfly S9
Silver medal – second place	1994 Valletta	200 m Individual medley SM9
World Championships and Games for the Disabled
Gold medal – first place	1990 Assen	Women's 4x100m Freestyle Relay S7
Silver medal – second place	1990 Assen	Women's 4x100m Freestyle Relay S1
Silver medal – second place	1990 Assen	Women's 100 m Butterfly S9
Bronze medal – third place	1990 Assen	Women's 50 m Freestyle S9
Bronze medal – third place	1990 Assen	Women's 200 m Individual Medley S9
Commonwealth Games
Bronze medal – third place	1994 Victoria	100m Freestyle

Kelly Barnes is an Australian Paralympic swimmer. At the 1992 Barcelona Games, she won two silver medals in the Women's 100 m Butterfly S9 and Women's 200 m Medley SM9 events. Barnes also competed in the 1994 Commonwealth Games, where she won a Bronze Medal in the Women's 100m Freestyle S9 event.
