= Catherine Huggett =

Australian Paralympic swimmer (1970–2011)

Personal information
- Full name: Catherine Lucette Dargie
- Nationality: Australia
- Born: Catherine Lucette Huggett; 6 May 1970 Canberra, Australia
- Died: 13 November 2011 (aged 41) Brisbane, Australia
Medal record
Swimming
Paralympic Games
Gold medal – first place	1992 Barcelona	Women's 4 x 50 m Freestyle S1–6
Silver medal – second place	1988 Seoul	Women's 100 m Backstroke C3
World Championships and Games for the Disabled
Gold medal – first place	1990 Assen	Women's 4 x 100m Freestyle C1
Bronze medal – third place	1990 Assen	Women's 50m Freestyle C4
Bronze medal – third place	1990 Assen	Women's 100m Freestyle C4
Bronze medal – third place	1990 Assen	Women's 50m Backstroke C4

Catherine Lucette Dargie, OAM (née Huggett; 6 May 1970 – 13 November 2011) was an Australian Paralympic swimmer who won two medals at two Paralympics.

== Early life ==
Catherine Lucette Huggett was born in Canberra on 6 May 1970, the daughter of Kenneth and Beverly Huggett. At birth she was diagnosed with cerebral palsy, but it was later determined that she had spina bifida.

Huggett's parents moved to Broadbeach Waters in 1985, where her swimming career was nurtured by the Director of Gold Coast Recreation and Sport, Anna-Louise Kassulke, and Denis Cotterell, who had been head coach of the Miami Swim Club since he had helped organise it in 1976. Huggett's mother approached Cotterell and asked him to include Huggett in his training squad. She promised that if he did so, Huggett would win a gold medal at the 1988 Summer Paralympics in Seoul. When he asked how strong Huggett was, she replied "You're talking Mallee bull."

== Swimming career ==
Huggett worked hard to deliver on this promise, swimming thousands of laps alongside fellow athletes including Grant Hackett and Andrew Baildon. At the 1988 Westfield Bicentennial Challenge in Sydney, she won gold medals in all ten events she entered, and broke a world record. She won Paralympic selection, and went on to Seoul where she won a silver medal in the 100 m backstroke.

In 1989, Huggett competed in the Robin Hood Cerebral Palsy Games in England, where she won six gold medals and one silver. That year she received the Queensland Disabled Athlete of the Year Award. The 1990 Australian Swimming Championships saw events for disabled athletes added for the first time, and she won gold. She went on to compete at the World Championships for the Disabled at Assen, where she won a gold and three bronze medals.

She was awarded a scholarship from the Queensland Academy of Sport at set about fulfilling her ambition of a Paralympic gold medal. At the 1992 Summer Paralympics in Barcelona she won one as a member of the 4 x 50 m freestyle S1–6 relay team who won the event in world record time. In 1993 she was named the Gold Coast Disabled Athlete of the Year for the fourth time. She was awarded the Medal of the Order of Australia in the 1993 Queens Birthday Honours "in recognition of service to sport as a gold medalist at the Paralympic games, Barcelona 1992".

== Later life ==
She married in 1993, an subsequently moved to the United Kingdom, and later came back to Australia, settling in Perth with her husband. However, her marriage eventually broke up, and her health deteriorated. After an unsuccessful medical procedure, she returned to Queensland, where she underwent further treatments.

She died in Brisbane on 13 November 2011. A funeral service was held at the North Burleigh Surf Life Saving Club on 26 November of that year. She was survived by her parents and brother.
