= Tracy Barrell =

Australian Paralympic swimmer

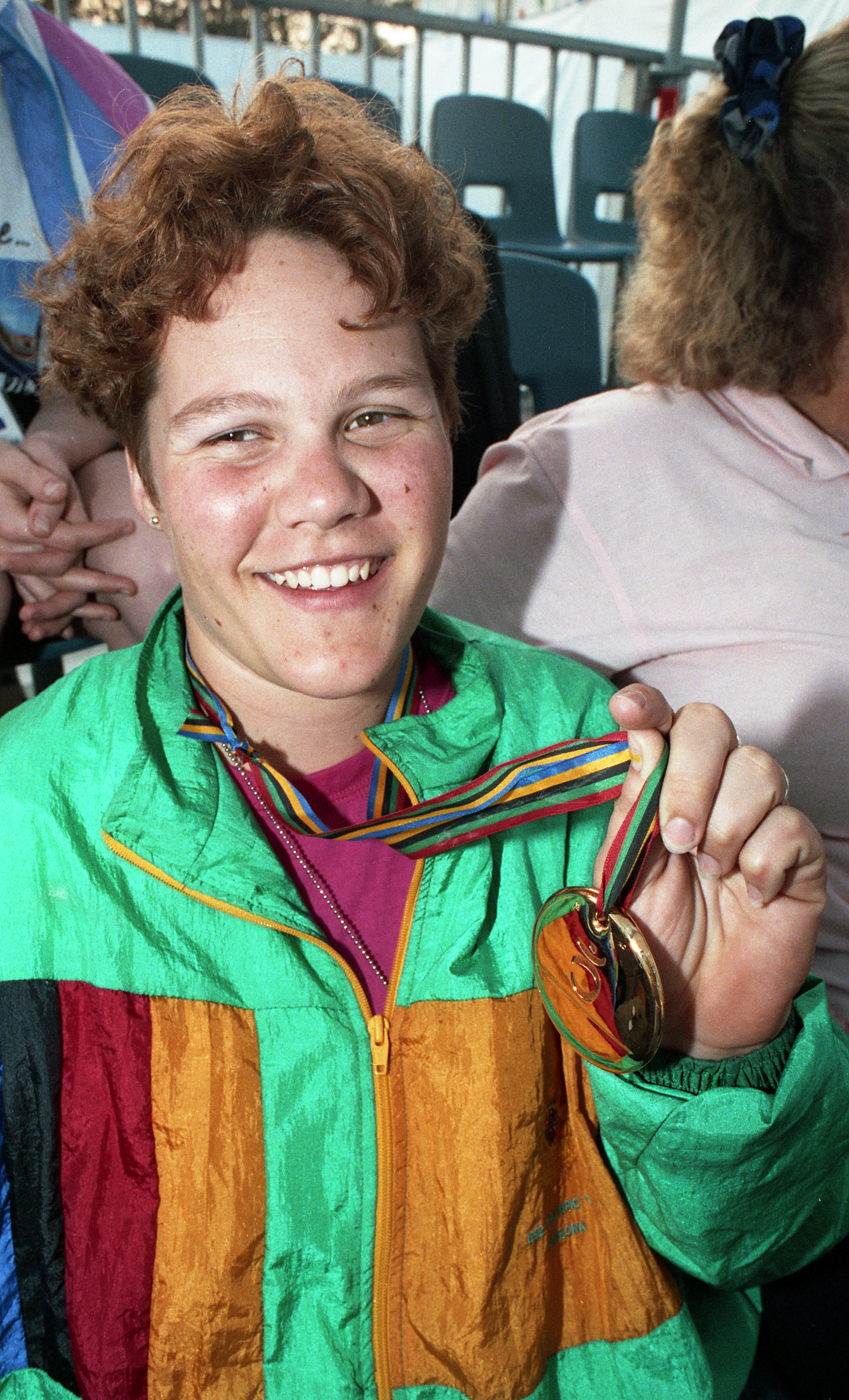
- Barrell in 1992

Personal information
- Nationality: Australia
- Born: 1974 (age 51–52) New South Wales, Australia
Medal record
Swimming
Paralympic Games
Gold medal – first place	1992 Barcelona	Women's 4x50 m Freestyle S1-6
Gold medal – first place	1992 Barcelona	Women's 50 m Butterfly S3-4

Tracy Lee Barrell, OAM (born 1974) is a triple congenital amputee Paralympic swimmer from Australia. She won two gold medals at the 1992 Barcelona Games. She is a strong advocate for people with disabilities and an indigenous Australian.

== Personal life ==
Barrell was born in 1974 in New South Wales. From birth she had no legs and only one arm. Barrell stated that doctors said her disability was a congenital malformation resulting from exposure to an anti morning sickness pill that her mother Terri had taken. Barrell sat on a skateboard and used her one arm for her mobility as a child. She decided not to use prosthetic legs. She attended St Patrick's College, Sutherland in Sydney.

She got married in February 1995 to Steve and got divorced 3 years later. She has two sons with her new partner Brad – Bryce (2001) and Oscar (2004). She separated from her partner and raised the children as a single mother.

== Sporting career ==
In 1989, at the age of 14, her mother enrolled her with the NSW Amputee Sporting Association and she commenced her swimming career. She was coached by Mick Maroney and later by Greg Hodge. Her first major competition was the NSW State Games held at Narrabeen Sports Centre where she won gold in four swimming events and two athletics throwing events. Her results led her to being awarded the Athlete of the Games. She was classified as a S4 swimmer.

Thanks to her mother, who sold their farm to get tickets to Spain, she took part in the 1992 Barcelona Games. She won two gold medals at the Paralympics in the Women's 4x50 m Freestyle S1-6 event and the Women's 50 m Butterfly S3-4 event and finished fourth in two individual events.

In 1993, for her sporting achievements, including those at the Paralympic Games, she was awarded the Medal of the Order of Australia (OAM).

She retired from swimming in 1994 due to injury and surgery to her only arm.

In 2008, she represented Australia at the Shanghai Women's Sitting Volleyball Tournament.

== Advocacy ==
Since her retirement from sport, she has been a strong advocate for opportunities for people with a disability. Between 2008 and 2015, she was an ambassador for Don't DIS my ABILITY, a program that provides inspirational role models for people with disabilities.

In 2011, she was denied access to all rides at Movie World Studios due to a change in their safety policy. In previous visits, she was able to access all the rides.

In 2013, she was appointed as a Living Life My Way Ambassadors and Champions by the New South Wales Government.

Barrell has indigenous heritage. In 2015, she was a spokesperson for First Peoples Disability Network and on December 3rd she took part in a celebration of indigenous Paralympians at National Centre of Indigenous Excellence in Sydney.
