= Tracey Oliver =

Australian Paralympic swimmer

Personal information
- Nationality: Australia
- Born: 26 May 1975 (age 51) Bundaberg
Medal record
Swimming
Paralympic Games
Silver medal – second place	1996 Atlanta	Women's 50m Freestyle S7
Bronze medal – third place	1992 Barcelona	Women's 50m Freestyle S7
IPC Swimming World Championships
Silver medal – second place	1994 Valletta	Women's 50 m Freestyle S7

Tracey Leanne Oliver (born 26 May 1975), is a Paralympic swimming competitor from Australia. She was in born in Bundaberg, Queensland. At the 1992 Barcelona Games, she won a bronze medal in Women's 50 m Freestyle S7 event. She also competed in Women's 100m Freestyle and 100m Backstroke S7 events. She won a silver medal at the 1996 Atlanta Games in the Women's 50 m Freestyle S7 event and also competed in the Women's 100m Freestyle and 100m Backstroke S7 events . She was an Australian Institute of Sport Athlete with a Disability scholar holder from 1994 to 1995. She works as a swimming coach in Bundaberg.
