= Darren Collins (athlete) =

Australian Paralympic athlete

Personal information
- Nationality: Australia
Medal record
Athletics
Paralympic Games
Bronze medal – third place	1992 Barcelona	Men's 200 m B1
Bronze medal – third place	1992 Barcelona	Men's 400 m B1
IPC Athletics World Championships
Silver medal – second place	1994 Berlin	Men's 100m T10
Silver medal – second place	1994 Berlin	Men's 400m T10
Bronze medal – third place	1994 Berlin	Men's 200m T10

Darren Collins (born 1969) is a Paralympic athletics competitor from Australia. He won a pair of bronze medals at the 1992 Barcelona Games in the Men's 200 m B1 event and the Men's 400 m B1 event.
