= Tony Head (athlete) =

Australian Paralympic athlete

Personal information
- Nationality: Australian
Medal record
Men's para-athletics
Representing Australia
Paralympic Games
Silver medal – second place	1992 Barcelona	Javelin THS3

Tony Head is an Australian Paralympic athlete. He won a silver medal at the 1992 Barcelona Games in the Men's Javelin THS3 event.
