= Jodi Willis-Roberts =

Australian Paralympic athlete and goalball player

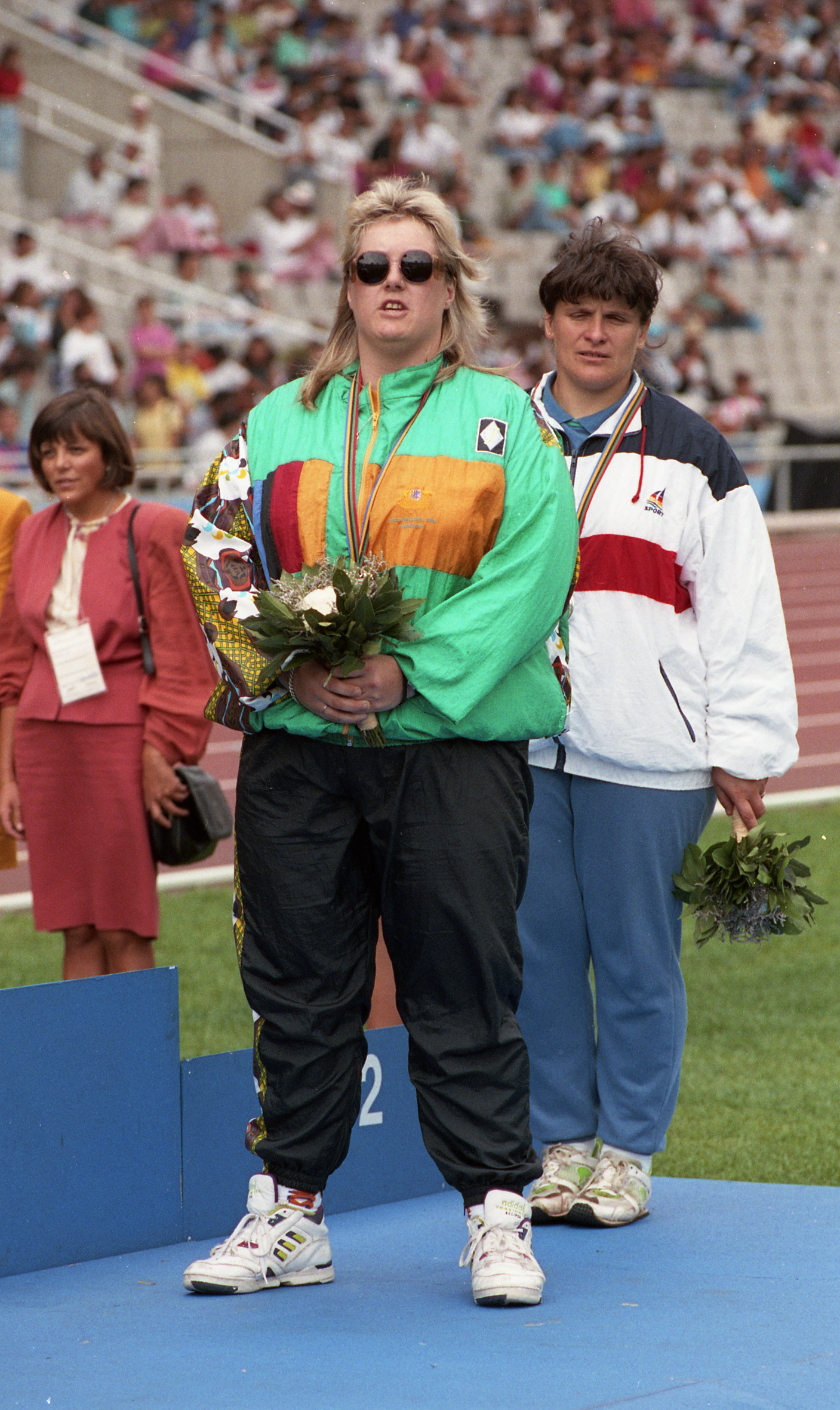
- Willis-Roberts at the 1992 Summer Paralympics

Personal information
- Full name: Jodi Glenda Willis-Roberts
- Born: 24 April 1967 (age 59) Preston, Victoria, Australia
Medal record
Paralympic athletics
Representing Australia
Paralympic Games
Gold medal – first place	1992 Barcelona	Women's Shot Put – B2
Gold medal – first place	2000 Sydney	Shot Put – F12-11
Silver medal – second place	1992 Barcelona	Discus – B2
Silver medal – second place	1996 Atlanta	Shot Put – F10-11
Bronze medal – third place	2000 Sydney	Discus Throw – F12
Bronze medal – third place	2004 Athens	Shot Put – F12
Bronze medal – third place	2008 Beijing	Shot Put – F12-13
World Championships and Games for the Disabled
Bronze medal – third place	1990 Assen	Women's Shot Put B2
IPC Athletics World Championships
Gold medal – first place	1994 Berlin	Women's Shot Put F11
Silver medal – second place	1994 Berlin	Women's Discus F11
Silver medal – second place	1994 Berlin	Women's Javelin F11
Gold medal – first place	1998 Birmingham	Women's Shot Put F12
Silver medal – second place	1998 Birmingham	Women's Discus F12
Bronze medal – third place	2002 Lille	Women's Shot F12
Bronze medal – third place	2002 Lille	Women's Discus F12

Jodi Glenda Willis-Roberts, OAM (born 24 April 1967) is a visually impaired Australian Paralympic athlete and goalballer.

== Biography ==
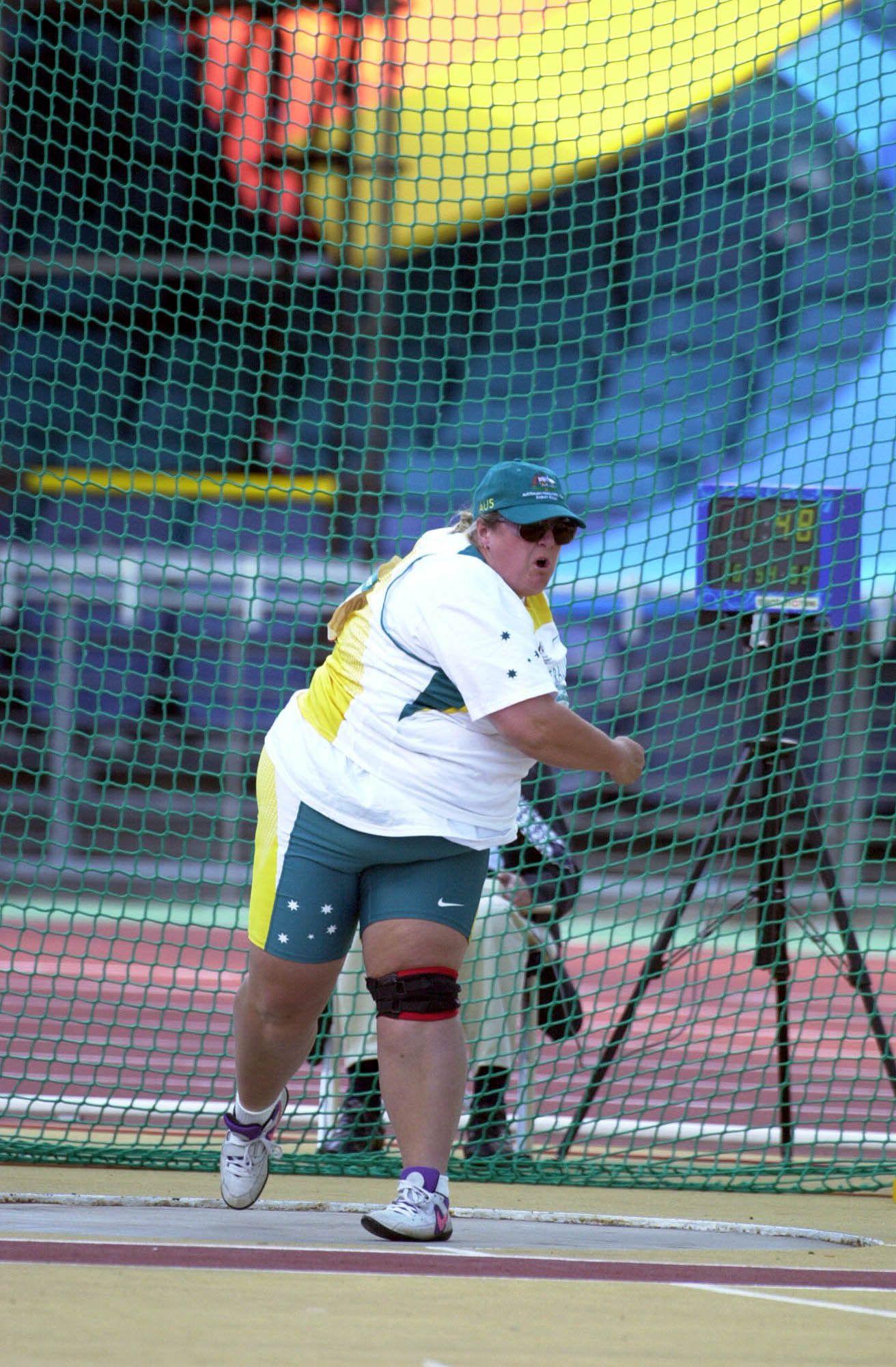
Action shot of Willis-Roberts throwing the discus at the 2000 Sydney Paralympics

Willis-Roberts was born in the Melbourne suburb of Preston. She first competed at the 1988 Seoul Paralympics with the Australia women's national goalball team, when it finished seventh. She moved to athletics and at the 1990 World Championships and Games for the Disabled in Assen, Netherlands, she won a bronze medal in the women's shot put B2. At the 1992 Barcelona Paralympics, she won a gold medal in the Women's Shot Put B2 event, for which she received a Medal of the Order of Australia, and a silver medal in the Women's Discus B2 event; she also competed in the national goalball team, which came seventh, and the Women's Javelin B1>3 – event. In 1995, she competed in the World Championships for powerlifting. In the 1996 Atlanta Olympics, she won a silver medal in the F10-11 shot put and also competed in the F10-11 discus throw. In 2000, she won an Australian Sports Medal. That year, she competed in her home country in the 2000 Sydney Paralympics where she won a gold medal in the F12 shot put and a bronze in the discus throw. At the 2004 Athens Games, she won a bronze medal in the Women's Shot Put F12 event and competed in the Women's Discus F13 – event. She also competed in the 2008 Beijing Olympics where she won a bronze medal in the women's F12-13 shot put event. After the Beijing Games, she had a shoulder reconstruction and tore her left hamstring off the bone at a training camp. In 2011, she was part of the Australian national goalball team that finished sixth at the IBSA Goalball World Cup.

In 1999, she was an Australian Institute of Sport Athletes with a Disability scholarship holder. In 2014, she lived in Bundaberg, Queensland.
