= Swimming at the 2000 Summer Paralympics =

Swimming at the XI Paralympic Games
- Paralympic Swimming
- Venue: Sydney International Aquatic Centre

Paralympic symbol (1994-2004)

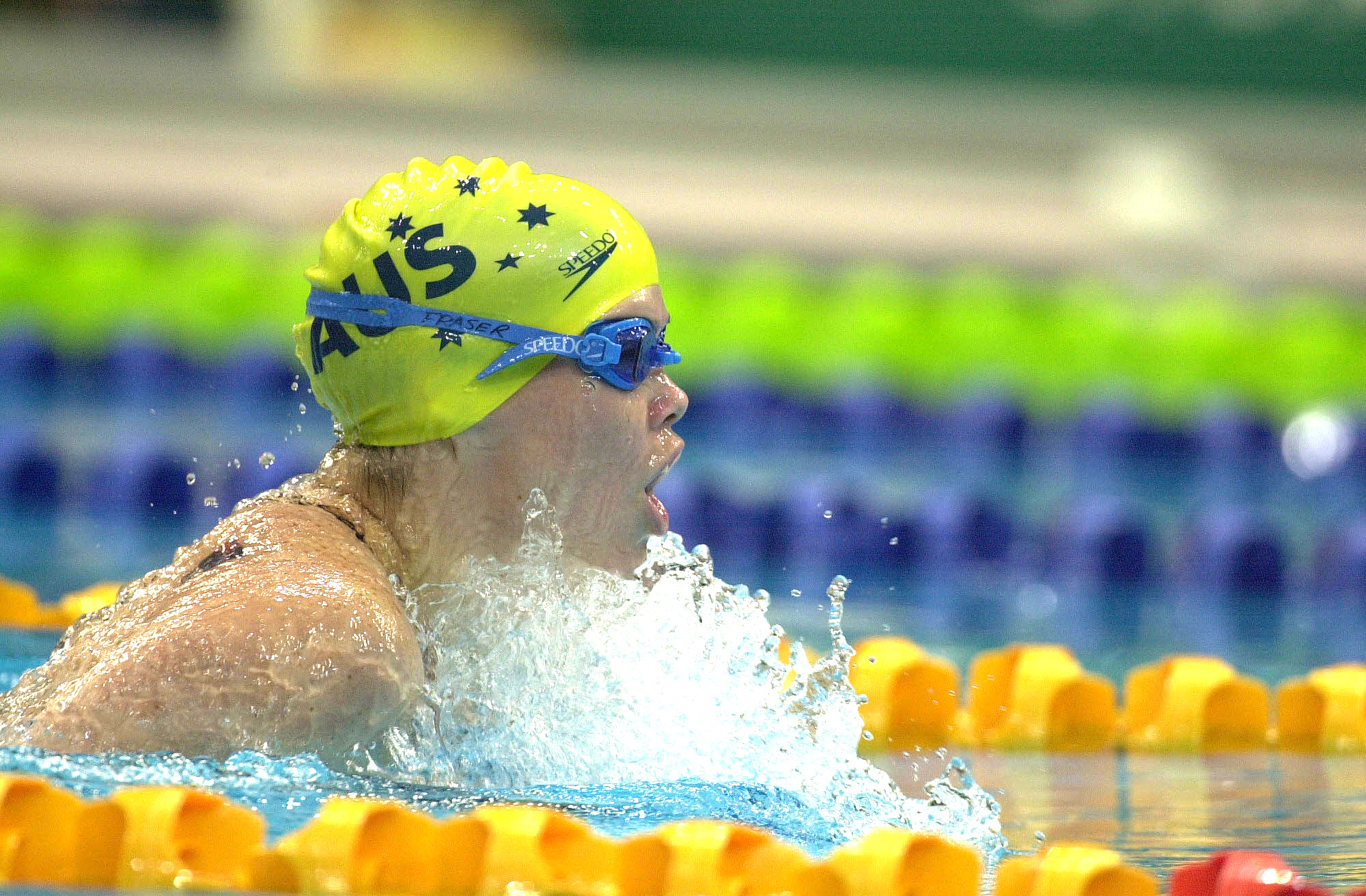
Australian swimmer Amanda Fraser competes in the S7 200IM at the 2000 Summer Paralympics.

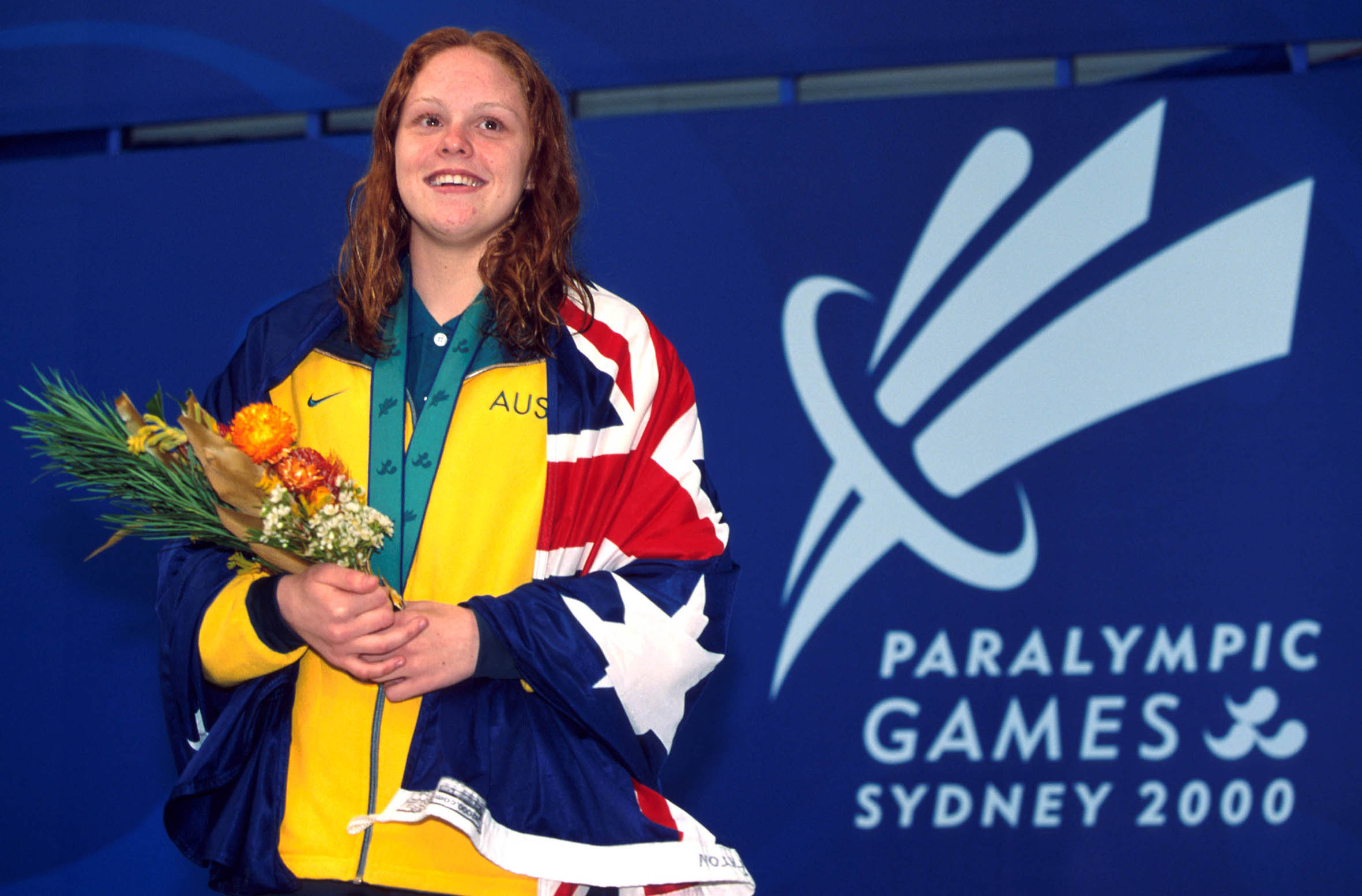
Australian swimmer Siobhan Paton on the gold medal podium for her win in the 100 m freestyle S14 at the 2000 Summer Paralympics. Paton won six gold medals at these games.

Swimming at the 2000 Summer Paralympics comprised a total of 169 events, 91 for men and 78 for women. Swimmers were classified according to the extent and type of their disability.

== Medal summary ==
=== Medal table ===
Rank	Nation	Gold	Silver	Bronze	Total
1	Canada (CAN)	23	15	10	48
2	Spain (ESP)	22	9	16	47
3	Great Britain (GBR)	15	24	23	62
4	United States (USA)	15	17	7	39
5	Australia (AUS)	14	15	21	50
6	China (CHN)	13	5	5	23
7	France (FRA)	9	7	3	19
8	Japan (JPN)	9	5	1	15
9	Netherlands (NED)	7	2	5	14
10	Mexico (MEX)	6	2	4	12
11	Hungary (HUN)	4	4	8	16
12	Denmark (DEN)	4	3	13	20
13	Czech Republic (CZE)	3	2	7	12
14	Israel (ISR)	3	0	0	3
15	Germany (GER)	2	10	9	21
16	South Africa (RSA)	2	5	4	11
17	Russia (RUS)	2	3	5	10
18	Ukraine (UKR)	2	3	2	7
19	Ireland (IRL)	2	2	0	4
20	Norway (NOR)	2	1	1	4
21	Iceland (ISL)	2	0	2	4
22	Greece (GRE)	2	0	1	3
23	Poland (POL)	1	10	7	18
24	Brazil (BRA)	1	6	4	11
25	Belarus (BLR)	1	2	1	4
25	New Zealand (NZL)	1	2	1	4
25	Slovakia (SVK)	1	2	1	4
28	Thailand (THA)	1	1	1	3
29	Peru (PER)	1	1	0	2
30	Faroe Islands (FRO)	0	3	1	4
31	Italy (ITA)	0	2	0	2
32	Belgium (BEL)	0	1	1	2
32	Estonia (EST)	0	1	1	2
34	Austria (AUT)	0	1	0	1
34	Portugal (POR)	0	1	0	1
34	Sweden (SWE)	0	1	0	1
37	Finland (FIN)	0	0	2	2
38	Argentina (ARG)	0	0	1	1
38	Switzerland (SUI)	0	0	1	1
Totals (39 entries)		170	168	169	507

=== Participating nations ===
- Argentina (8)
- Australia (53)
- Austria (3)
- Belarus (2)
- Belgium (4)
- Brazil (16)
- Canada (25)
- Chile (1)
- China (27)
- Chinese Taipei (1)
- Colombia (2)
- Croatia (2)
- Cuba (1)
- Cyprus (2)
- Czech Republic (13)
- Denmark (14)
- Egypt (1)
- Estonia (2)
- Faroe Islands (2)
- Fiji (1)
- Finland (5)
- France (15)
- Germany (26)
- Great Britain (48)
- Greece (10)
- Hong Kong (4)
- Hungary (12)
- Iceland (4)
- Ireland (3)
- Israel (8)
- Italy (2)
- Jamaica (1)
- Japan (17)
- Lithuania (1)
- Macau (1)
- Malaysia (2)
- Mexico (12)
- Morocco (1)
- Netherlands (15)
- New Zealand (5)
- Norway (7)
- Peru (2)
- Poland (23)
- Portugal (5)
- Russia (20)
- Rwanda (1)
- Slovakia (6)
- Slovenia (1)
- South Africa (12)
- South Korea (3)
- Spain (55)
- Sri Lanka (1)
- Sweden (8)
- Switzerland (2)
- Thailand (10)
- Turkey (1)
- Uganda (1)
- Ukraine (11)
- United States (29)
- Uruguay (1)
- Venezuela (1)
- Yugoslavia (1)

== Events ==
=== Men's events ===
Event	Gold	Silver	Bronze
50 m backstroke S2	Hector Lopez; Spain	James Anderson; Great Britain	Pekka Kantola; Finland
50 m backstroke S3	Martin Kovar; Czech Republic	Jaime Eulert; Peru	Albert Bakaev; Russia
50 m backstroke S4	Juan Ignacio Reyes; Mexico	Gaetan Dautresire; France	Hua Bin Zeng; China
50 m backstroke S5	Zsolt Vereczkei; Hungary	He Junquan; China	Krzysztof Sleczka; Poland
50 m breaststroke SB2	José Arnulfo Castorena; Mexico	James Thompson; United States	Saifon Kaewsri; Thailand
50 m breaststroke SB3	Miguel Luque; Spain	Thomas Rosenberger; Austria	Javier Torres; Spain
50 m butterfly S4	Somchai Doungkaew; Thailand	Juan Ignacio Reyes; Mexico	John Petersson; Denmark
50 m butterfly S5	He Junquan; China	Pascal Pinard; France	Ervin Kovacs; Hungary
50 m butterfly S6	Daniel Vidal; Spain	Luís Silva; Brazil	Kai Xia; China
50 m butterfly S7	Yuriy Andryushin; Ukraine	Ritchie Barber; Great Britain	Mark Altmann; Australia
50 m butterfly S14	Alwin Houtsma; Netherlands	Krisztian Santa; Hungary	Tibor Szedoe; Hungary
50 m freestyle S2	Curtis Lovejoy; United States	James Anderson; Great Britain	Miroslaw Piesak; Poland
50 m freestyle S3	Jaime Eulert; Peru	Kenneth Cairns; Great Britain	Albert Bakaev; Russia
50 m freestyle S4	Richard Oribe; Spain	Luca Mazzone; Italy	Clodoaldo Silva; Brazil
50 m freestyle S5	Sebastián Rodríguez; Spain	Ryszard Beczek; Poland	Ervin Kovacs; Hungary
50 m freestyle S6	Jianhua Yin; China	Daniel Vidal; Spain	Peter Lund Andersen; Denmark
50 m freestyle S7	David Roberts; Great Britain	Matt Walker; Great Britain	Alex Harris; Australia
50 m freestyle S8	Konstantinos Fykas; Greece	Hengheng Tian; China	Emil Broendum; Denmark
50 m freestyle S9	Xiao Ming Xiong; China	Mauro Brasil; Brazil	Pavel Machala; Czech Republic
50 m freestyle S10	Benoît Huot; Canada	Hannes Venter; South Africa	Danilo Glasser; Brazil
50 m freestyle S11	Junichi Kawai; Japan	Daniel Kelly; United States	Ruslan Burlakov; Ukraine
50 m freestyle S12	Ebert Kleynhans; South Africa	Darren Leach; Great Britain	Ian Sharpe; Great Britain
50 m freestyle S13	Andrey Strokin; Russia	Scott Field; South Africa	Dervis Konuralp; Great Britain
50 m freestyle S14	Alwin Houtsma; Netherlands	Krisztian Santa; Hungary	Craig Groenewald; South Africa
100 m backstroke S6	Adam Purdy; Canada	Swen Michaelis; Germany	Jianhua Yin; China
100 m backstroke S7	Andrew Lindsay; Great Britain	David Roberts; Great Britain	Guillermo Marro; Argentina
100 m backstroke S8	David Malone; Ireland	Holger Kimmig; Germany	Travis Mohr; United States
100 m backstroke S9	James Crisp; Great Britain	Sean Tretheway; New Zealand	Jesús Collado Alarcón; Spain
100 m backstroke S10	Maciej Maik; Poland	Benoît Huot; Canada	Jody Cundy; Great Britain
100 m backstroke S11	Daniel Kelly; United States	Junichi Kawai; Japan	Miguel Deniz; Spain
100 m backstroke S12	Yoshikazu Sakai; Japan	Raman Makarau; Belarus	Francisco Segarra; Spain
100 m backstroke S13	Walter Wu; Canada	Enrique Floriano; Spain	Noel Pedersen; Norway
100 m backstroke S14	Krisztian Santa; Hungary	Pawel Penar; Poland	Alwin Houtsma; Netherlands
100 m breaststroke SB4	Ricardo Ten; Spain	Pascal Pinard; France	Ervin Kovacs; Hungary
100 m breaststroke SB5	Kasper Engel; Netherlands	Tadhg Slattery; South Africa	Thomas Grimm; Germany
100 m breaststroke SB6	Travis Mohr; United States	Eric Lindmann; France	Wayne Ryding; Great Britain
100 m breaststroke SB7	Sascha Kindred; Great Britain	Baoren Gong; China	Matt Walker; Great Britain
100 m breaststroke SB8	Rune Ulvang; Norway	Wei Zhao; China	Martin Jacobsen; Denmark
100 m breaststroke SB9	Paul Barnett; Australia	Maciej Maik; Poland	Hannes Venter; South Africa
100 m breaststroke SB11	Oleksandr Mashchenko; Ukraine	Christian Bundgaard; Denmark	Daniel Kelly; United States
100 m breaststroke SB12	Kingsley Bugarin; Australia	Robert Musiorski; Poland	Darren Leach; Great Britain
100 m breaststroke SB13	Noel Pedersen; Norway	Dmitriy Ivanov; Russia	Ivan Nielsen; Denmark
100 m breaststroke SB14	Alwin Houtsma; Netherlands	Piotr Penar; Poland	Janos Racz; Hungary
100 m butterfly S8	Giles Long; Great Britain	Emil Broendum; Denmark	Benoit Austin; Australia
100 m butterfly S9	Jesús Collado Alarcón; Spain	James Crisp; Great Britain	Andrew Haley; Canada
100 m butterfly S10	Jody Cundy; Great Britain	Philippe Gagnon; Canada	Scott Brockenshire; Australia
100 m butterfly S12	Raman Makarau; Belarus	Ian Sharpe; Great Britain	Yoshikazu Sakai; Japan
100 m butterfly S13	Walter Wu; Canada	Brian Hill; Canada	Scott Field; South Africa
100 m freestyle S2	Curtis Lovejoy; United States	James Anderson; Great Britain	Philippe Revillon; France
100 m freestyle S3	Kenneth Cairns; Great Britain	Albert Bakaev; Russia	Martin Kovar; Czech Republic
100 m freestyle S4	Richard Oribe; Spain	Clodoaldo Silva; Brazil	Jan Povysil; Czech Republic
100 m freestyle S5	Sebastián Rodríguez; Spain	Ryszard Beczek; Poland	Lars Luerig; Germany
100 m freestyle S6	Jianhua Yin; China	Adriano Gomes de Lima; Brazil	Peter Lund Andersen; Denmark
100 m freestyle S7	David Roberts; Great Britain	Alex Harris; Australia	Dean Booth; New Zealand
100 m freestyle S8	Konstantinos Fykas; Greece	Holger Kimmig; Germany	Juan Francisco Jimenez; Spain
100 m freestyle S9	Xiao Ming Xiong; China	Cameron de Burgh; Australia	James Crisp; Great Britain
100 m freestyle S10	Philippe Gagnon; Canada	Benoît Huot; Canada	Scott Brockenshire; Australia
100 m freestyle S11	Daniel Kelly; United States	Junichi Kawai; Japan	Ruslan Burlakov; Ukraine
100 m freestyle S12	Ebert Kleynhans; South Africa	Yoshikazu Sakai; Japan	Darren Leach; Great Britain
100 m freestyle S13	Andrey Strokin; Russia	Scott Field; South Africa	Walter Wu; Canada
100 m freestyle S14	Alwin Houtsma; Netherlands	Krisztian Santa; Hungary	Pavol Kolackovsky; Slovakia
150 m individual medley SM3	Juan Ignacio Reyes; Mexico	Somchai Doungkaew; Thailand	Genezi Andrade; Brazil
150 m individual medley SM4	Javier Torres; Spain	Krzysztof Sleczka; Poland	John Petersson; Denmark
200 m freestyle S3	Gaetan Dautresire; France	Kenneth Cairns; Great Britain	Samuel Soler; Spain
200 m freestyle S4	Richard Oribe; Spain	Luca Mazzone; Italy	John Petersson; Denmark
200 m freestyle S5	Sebastián Rodríguez; Spain	Ryszard Beczek; Poland	Lars Luerig; Germany
200 m freestyle S14	Pavol Kolackovsky; Slovakia	Alwin Houtsma; Netherlands	Craig Groenewald; South Africa
200 m individual medley SM5	Pablo Cimadevila; Spain	Pascal Pinard; France	Arkadiusz Pawlowski; Poland
200 m individual medley SM6	Sascha Kindred; Great Britain	Tadhg Slattery; South Africa	Thomas Grimm; Germany
200 m individual medley SM7	Eric Lindmann; France	Janos Becsey; Hungary	Daniel Kuenzi; Switzerland
200 m individual medley SM8	Hengheng Tian; China	Benoit Austin; Australia	Holger Kimmig; Germany
200 m individual medley SM9	James Crisp; Great Britain	Jaime Serrano; Spain	Jesús Collado Alarcón; Spain
200 m individual medley SM10	Benoît Huot; Canada	Maciej Maik; Poland	Jurjen Engelsman; Netherlands
200 m individual medley SM11	Daniel Kelly; United States	Junichi Kawai; Japan	Donovan Tildesley; Canada
200 m individual medley SM12	Kingsley Bugarin; Australia	Raman Makarau; Belarus	Yury Rudzenok; Belarus
200 m individual medley SM13	Enrique Floriano; Spain	Walter Wu; Canada	Tyler Emmett; Canada
200 m individual medley SM14	Alwin Houtsma; Netherlands	Stewart Pike; Australia	Krisztian Santa; Hungary
400 m freestyle S6	Peter Lund Andersen; Denmark	Zhiqiang Zhang; China	Jianhua Yin; China
400 m freestyle S7	Dean Booth; New Zealand	David Roberts; Great Britain	Eric Lindmann; France
400 m freestyle S8	Jason Wening; United States	Juan Francisco Jimenez; Spain	Emil Broendum; Denmark
400 m freestyle S9	Jaime Serrano; Spain	Enrique Tornero; Spain	James Crisp; Great Britain
400 m freestyle S10	Philippe Gagnon; Canada	Benoît Huot; Canada	Joost de Hoogh; Netherlands
400 m freestyle S12	Jeff Hardy; Australia	Kingsley Bugarin; Australia	Robert Musiorski; Poland
400 m freestyle S13	Enrique Floriano; Spain	Walter Wu; Canada	Christopher Fox; Great Britain
4×50 m freestyle relay 20 pts	Spain (ESP); Richard Oribe; Daniel Vidal; Javier Torres; Sebastián Rodríguez	Brazil (BRA); Adriano Gomes de Lima; Luís Silva; Clodoaldo Silva; Joon Sok Seo	Great Britain (GBR); Sascha Kindred; David Roberts; Kenneth Cairns; Paul Johnston
4×50 m medley relay 20 pts	Spain (ESP); Sebastián Rodríguez; Ricardo Ten; Javier Torres; Jordi Gordillo; Daniel Vidal; Vicente Gil; Pablo Cimadevila	Brazil (BRA); Francisco Avelino; Adriano Gomes de Lima; Luís Silva; Clodoaldo Silva	China (CHN); Kai Xia; Qiwen Mao; Peng Li; Hua Bin Zeng; Junquan He
4×50 m medley relay S14	Hungary (HUN); Gabor Majer; Janos Racz; Tibor Szedoe; Krisztian Santa	Netherlands (NED); Marcel Kamst; Jeroen Gottemaker; Alwin Houtsma; Jeroen van Oene	Poland (POL); Pawel Penar; Piotr Penar; Pawel Lepko; Andrzej Gimier
4×100 m freestyle relay 34 pts	Great Britain (GBR); Jody Cundy; Giles Long; David Roberts; James Crisp; Matt Walker; Marc Woods	Australia (AUS); Scott Brockenshire; Ben Austin; Cameron de Burgh; Brendan Burkett; Shane Walsh; Alex Harris; Justin Eveson	Brazil (BRA); Adriano Gomes de Lima; Fabiano Machado; Danilo Glasser; Mauro Brasil; Luís Silva; Gledson Soares
4×100 m freestyle relay S14	Australia (AUS); Brett Reid; Paul Cross; Patrick Donachie; Stewart Pike	Great Britain (GBR); Francis Dart; Peter Snashall; Chris Hendy; Chris Pugh	Russia (RUS); Roman Kiselev; Alexei Grichaev; Vadim Grankin; Maxim Egorov
4×100 m medley relay 34 pts	Canada (CAN); Brad Sales; Philippe Gagnon; Andrew Haley; Robert Penner; Benoît Huot; Adam Purdy	Great Britain (GBR); Sascha Kindred; James Crisp; David Roberts; Giles Long; Paul Noble; Marc Woods	Australia (AUS); Cameron de Burgh; Paul Barnett; David Rolfe; Alex Harris; Benoit Austin; Daniel Bell; Justin Eveson
4×100 m medley relay S11-13	Japan (JPN); Yoshikazu Sakai; Yasuharu Chujo; Junichi Kawai; Koshiro Sugita	Great Britain (GBR); Tim Reddish; Ian Sharpe; Darren Leach; Christopher Holmes	Spain (ESP); Francisco Segarra; Luis Arevalo; Enrique Floriano; Miguel Deniz

=== Women's events ===
Event	Gold	Silver	Bronze
50 m backstroke S2	Sara Carracelas; Spain	Mairead Berry; Ireland	Maria Kalpakidou; Greece
50 m backstroke S3	Annke Conradi; Germany	Susana Barroso; Portugal	Jana Hoffmanová; Czech Republic
50 m backstroke S4	Mayumi Narita; Japan	Anne Cécile Lequien; France	Natalia Popova; Russia
50 m backstroke S5	Béatrice Hess; France	Kateřina Lišková; Czech Republic	Teresa Perales; Spain
50 m backstroke S14	Siobhan Paton; Australia	Ivana Kumpoštová; Czech Republic	Janne Mugame; Estonia
50 m breaststroke SB3	Margaret McEleny; Great Britain	Mayumi Narita; Japan	Patricia Valle; Mexico
50 m breaststroke SB14	Ivana Kumpoštová; Czech Republic	Yolanda Jurado; Spain	Alicia Aberley; Australia
50 m butterfly S5	Béatrice Hess; France	Teresa Perales; Spain	Katalin Engelhardt; Hungary
50 m butterfly S6	Erin Popovich; United States	Ludivine Loiseau; France	Doramitzi Gonzalez; Mexico
50 m butterfly S7	Elisabeth Walker; Canada	Margita Prokeinova; Slovakia	Shannon Bothelio; United States
50 m butterfly S14	Siobhan Paton; Australia	Emma Mounkley; Great Britain	Vera Stillnerova; Czech Republic
50 m freestyle S2	Victoria Broadribb; Great Britain	Mairead Berry; Ireland	Sara Carracelas; Spain
50 m freestyle S3	Jana Hoffmanová; Czech Republic	Annke Conradi; Germany	Patricia Valle; Mexico
50 m freestyle S4	Mayumi Narita; Japan	Kay Espenhayn; Germany	Karen Breumsoe; Denmark
50 m freestyle S5	Béatrice Hess; France	Olena Akopyan; Ukraine	Teresa Perales; Spain
50 m freestyle S6	Doramitzi Gonzalez; Mexico	Erin Popovich; United States	Jeanette Chippington; Great Britain
50 m freestyle S7	Danielle Campo; Canada	Shannon Bothelio; United States	Amanda Fraser; Australia
50 m freestyle S8	Keren Or Leybovitch; Israel	Heidi Andreasen; Faroe Islands	Pernille Thomsen; Denmark
50 m freestyle S9	Ricka Stenger; Denmark	Stephanie Dixon; Canada	Sabrina Bellavia; Belgium
50 m freestyle S10	Jessica Sloan; Canada	Kendra Berner; United States	Anne Polinario; Canada
50 m freestyle S11	Fabiana Sugimori; Brazil	Jessica Tuomela; Canada	Tracey Cross; Australia
50 m freestyle S12	Hong Yan Zhu; China	Marge Kõrkjas; Estonia	Trischa Zorn; United States
50 m freestyle S13	Elizabeth Scott; United States	Kirby Cote; Canada	Chelsey Gotell; Canada
50 m freestyle S14	Siobhan Paton; Australia	Emma Mounkley; Great Britain	Tracy Wiscombe; Great Britain
100 m backstroke S6	Doramitzi Gonzalez; Mexico	Nyree Lewis; Great Britain	Ludivine Loiseau; France
100 m backstroke S7	Kristin Hakonardottir; Iceland	Eva Renate Nesheim; Norway	Shannon Bothelio; United States
100 m backstroke S8	Keren Or Leybovitch; Israel	Fiona Neale; Great Britain	Heidi Andreasen; Faroe Islands
100 m backstroke S9	Stephanie Dixon; Canada	Beata Drozdowska; Poland	Casey Redford; Australia
100 m backstroke S10	Karen Norris; United States	Sarah Bailey; Great Britain	Anne Polinario; Canada
100 m backstroke S11	Qiming Dong; China	Daniela Roehle; Germany	Raquel Saavedra; Spain
100 m backstroke S12	Hong Yan Zhu; China	Trischa Zorn; United States	Patrycja Harajda; Poland
100 m breaststroke SB5	Erin Popovich; United States	Nora Prochazka; Sweden	Nyree Lewis; Great Britain
100 m breaststroke SB6	Judith Green; Australia	Sarah Castle; United States	Lucy Williams; Australia
100 m breaststroke SB7	Kristin Hakonardottir; Iceland	Tamara Nowitzki; Australia	Stacey Williams; Australia
100 m breaststroke SB8	Sisse Grynet Egeborg; Denmark	Sabrina Bellavia; Belgium	Brooke Stockham; Australia
100 m breaststroke SB9	Jessica Sloan; Canada	Yulia Nikitina; Russia	Lara Ferguson; Great Britain
100 m breaststroke SB12	Deborah Font; Spain	Trischa Zorn; United States	Elaine Barrett; Great Britain
100 m breaststroke SB13	Kirby Cote; Canada	Chelsey Gotell; Canada	Elizabeth Scott; United States
100 m butterfly S8	Syreeta van Amelsvoort; Netherlands	Andrea Cole; Canada	Dóra Pásztory; Hungary
100 m butterfly S9	Emily Jennings; Great Britain	Ricka Stenger; Denmark	Katerina Bailey; Australia
100 m butterfly S12	Hong Yan Zhu; China	Trischa Zorn; United States	Ana Garcia-Arcicollar; Spain
100 m freestyle S2	Mairead Berry; Ireland	Sara Carracelas; Spain	Virginia Hernandez; Mexico
100 m freestyle S3	Patricia Valle; Mexico	Annke Conradi; Germany	Jana Hoffmanová; Czech Republic
100 m freestyle S4	Mayumi Narita; Japan	Kay Espenhayn; Germany	Karen Breumsoe; Denmark
100 m freestyle S5	Béatrice Hess; France	Olena Akopyan; Ukraine	Teresa Perales; Spain
100 m freestyle S6	Erin Popovich; United States	Doramitzi Gonzalez; Mexico	Jeanette Chippington; Great Britain
100 m freestyle S7	Danielle Campo; Canada	Lauren Reynolds; United States	Kristin Hakonardottir; Iceland
100 m freestyle S8	Keren Or Leybovitch; Israel	Heidi Andreasen; Faroe Islands	Priya Cooper; Australia
100 m freestyle S9	Stephanie Dixon; Canada	Melissa Carlton; Australia	Mendy Meenderink; Netherlands
100 m freestyle S10	Jessica Sloan; Canada	Kendra Berner; United States	Anne Polinario; Canada
100 m freestyle S11	Anais Garcia; Spain	Tracey Cross; Australia	Eeva Riitta Fingerroos; Finland
100 m freestyle S12	Hong Yan Zhu; China	Melanie Easter; Great Britain	Kirsty Stoneham; Great Britain
100 m freestyle S13	Elizabeth Scott; United States	Kirby Cote; Canada	Jennifer Butcher; United States
100 m freestyle S14	Siobhan Paton; Australia	Alicia Aberley; Australia	Tracy Wiscombe; Great Britain
150 m individual medley SM4	Mayumi Narita; Japan	Kay Espenhayn; Germany	Margaret McEleny; Great Britain
200 m freestyle S4	Mayumi Narita; Japan	Kay Espenhayn; Germany	Karen Breumsoe; Denmark
200 m freestyle S5	Béatrice Hess; France	Olena Akopyan; Ukraine	Teresa Perales; Spain
200 m freestyle S14	Siobhan Paton; Australia	Tracy Wiscombe; Great Britain	Alicia Aberley; Australia
200 m individual medley SM6	Béatrice Hess; France	Erin Popovich; United States	Maria Götze; Germany
200 m individual medley SM7	Elisabeth Walker; Canada	Margita Prokeinova; Slovakia	Kristin Hakonardottir; Iceland
200 m individual medley SM8	Dóra Pásztory; Hungary	Gillian Pollock; New Zealand	Brooke Stockham; Australia
200 m individual medley SM9	Ricka Stenger; Denmark	Stephanie Dixon; Canada	Kateřina Coufalová; Czech Republic
200 m individual medley SM10	Jessica Sloan; Canada	Gemma Dashwood; Australia	Claudia Hengst; Germany
200 m individual medley SM11	Qiming Dong; China	Elaine Barrett; Great Britain	Olga Sokolova; Russia
200 m individual medley SM12	Hong Yan Zhu; China	Trischa Zorn; United States	Melanie Easter; Great Britain
200 m individual medley SM13	Kirby Cote; Canada	Elizabeth Scott; United States	Chelsey Gotell; Canada
200 m individual medley SM14	Siobhan Paton; Australia	Alicia Aberley; Australia	Emma Mounkley; Great Britain
400 m freestyle S6	Stephanie Brooks; United States	Elizabeth Wright; Australia	Maria Götze; Germany
400 m freestyle S7	Lauren Reynolds; United States	Danielle Campo; Canada	Moorea Longstaff; Canada
400 m freestyle S8	Priya Cooper; Australia	Heidi Andreasen; Faroe Islands	Aneta Michalska; Poland
400 m freestyle S9	Stephanie Dixon; Canada	Melissa Carlton; Australia	Dianna Ley; Australia
400 m freestyle S10	Gemma Dashwood; Australia	Kendra Berner; United States	Claudia Hengst; Germany
400 m freestyle S11	Anais Garcia; Spain	Tracey Cross; Australia	Marion Nijhof; Netherlands
400 m freestyle S12	Melanie Easter; Great Britain	Ana Garcia-Arcicollar; Spain	Deborah Font; Spain
4×50 m freestyle relay 20 pts	Japan (JPN); Erika Nara; Sakuko Kato; Takako Fujita; Mayumi Narita	United States (USA); Erin Popovich; Aimee Bruder; Melanie Benn; Stephanie Brooks	Australia (AUS); Denise Beckwith; Elizabeth Wright; Melissa Willson; Karni Liddell
4×50 m medley relay 20 pts	France (FRA); Anne Cécile Lequien; Virginie Tripier-Martheau; Béatrice Hess; Ludivine Loiseau	Germany (GER); Daniela Pohl; Maria Götze; Kay Espenhayn; Annke Conradi	Great Britain (GBR); Jane Stidever; Margaret McEleny; Nyree Lewis; Jeanette Chippington
4×100 m freestyle relay 34 pts	Canada (CAN); Jessica Sloan; Danielle Campo; Andrea Cole; Stephanie Dixon	United States (USA); Kendra Berner; Lauren Reynolds; Karen Norris; Shannon Bothelio	Australia (AUS); Melissa Carlton; Priya Cooper; Amanda Fraser; Gemma Dashwood
4×100 m medley relay 34 pts	Canada (CAN); Stephanie Dixon; Jessica Sloan; Elisabeth Walker; Darda Geiger	Great Britain (GBR); Jeanette Chippington; Emily Jennings; Lara Ferguson; Sarah Bailey	Australia (AUS); Priya Cooper; Brooke Stockham; Katerina Bailey; Melissa Carlton
