= Swimming at the 2000 Summer Paralympics – Men's 200 metre individual medley SM10 =

Men's 200m individual medley SM10 at the XI Paralympic Games
- Paralympic Swimming
- Venue: Sydney International Aquatics Centre
- Dates: 20 October 2000

Medalists
1st place, gold medalist(s)		Benoit Huot	Canada
2nd place, silver medalist(s)		Maciej Maik	Poland
3rd place, bronze medalist(s)		Jurjen Engelsman	Netherlands

The men's 200m individual medley SM10 event took place on 20 October 2000 in Sydney, Australia.

== Results ==
=== Heat 1 ===
Rank	Athlete	Time	Notes
1	Jurjen Engelsman (NED)	2:25.72	Q
2	Hannes Venter (RSA)	2:26.37	Q
3	Justin Eveson (AUS)	2:28.00	Q
4	Daniel Bell (AUS)	2:29.93	Q
5	Paul Barnett (AUS)	2:30.00	
6	Chamida Priyadarshana (SRI)	2:43.63	

=== Heat 2 ===
Rank	Athlete	Time	Notes
1	Benoit Huot (CAN)	2:18.37	Q, PR
2	Maciej Maik (POL)	2:19.96	Q
3	Joost de Hoogh (NED)	2:23.51	Q
4	Hayden Brown (NZL)	2:29.84	Q
5	Mario Kofler (GER)	2:33.99	
6	Alexander Chelochkov (RUS)	2:44.40	

=== Final ===
Rank	Athlete	Time	Notes
1st place, gold medalist(s)	Benoit Huot (CAN)	2:17.13	PR
2nd place, silver medalist(s)	Maciej Maik (POL)	2:19.72	
3rd place, bronze medalist(s)	Jurjen Engelsman (NED)	2:20.95	
4	Joost de Hoogh (NED)	2:21.13	
5	Hannes Venter (RSA)	2:26.82	
6	Hayden Brown (NZL)	2:28.01	
7	Daniel Bell (AUS)	2:29.51	
	Justin Eveson (AUS)		DQ
