= New Zealand at the 2000 Summer Paralympics =

- IPC code: NZL
- NPC: Paralympics New Zealand
- Website: paralympics.org.nz

in Sydney
- Flag bearer: Ben Lucas
- Medals Ranked 25th: Gold 6 Silver 8 Bronze 4 Total 18

Summer Paralympics appearances (overview)
- 1968; 1972; 1976; 1980; 1984; 1988; 1992; 1996; 2000; 2004; 2008; 2012; 2016; 2020; 2024

There were 6 female and 37 male athletes representing the country at the 2000 Summer Paralympics.

== Medallists ==
Medal	Name	Sport	Event
Gold	John Dowall	Athletics	Men's javelin throw F44
Gold	David MacCalman	Athletics	Men's javelin throw F52
Gold	David MacCalman	Athletics	Men's pentathlon P53
Gold	Peter Martin	Athletics	Men's shot put F53
Gold	Jayne Craike	Equestrian	Mixed dressage - Championship grade IV
Gold	Dean Booth	Swimming	Men's 400 m freestyle S7
Gold	Jeny Newstead	Swimming	Women's 100 m backstroke S6
Silver	John Dowall	Athletics	Men's shot put F44
Silver	Tim Prendergast	Athletics	Men's 1500 m T13
Silver	Tim Prendergast	Athletics	Men's 800 m T13
Silver	Matt Slade	Athletics	Men's 200 m T37
Silver	Mark Inglis	Cycling	Mixed 1 km time trial LC3
Silver	Jayne Craike	Equestrian	Mixed dressage - Freestyle grade IV
Silver	Gillian Pollock	Swimming	Women's 200 m individual medley SM8
Silver	Sean Tretheway	Swimming	Men's 100 m backstroke S9
Bronze	Peter Martin	Athletics	Men's pentathlon P53
Bronze	Matt Slade	Athletics	Men's 100 m T37
Bronze	Dean Booth	Swimming	Men's 100 m freestyle S7
Bronze	New Zealand	Wheelchair rugby	Mixed

== See also ==
- New Zealand at the 2000 Summer Olympics
- New Zealand at the Paralympics

== Bibliography ==
- International Paralympic Committee (2000). "Appendix C: Athlete Numbers - By Delegation". Sydney 2000 Paralympic Games Post Games Report. Sydney.
