= Alex Harris (swimmer) =

Australian Paralympic swimmer

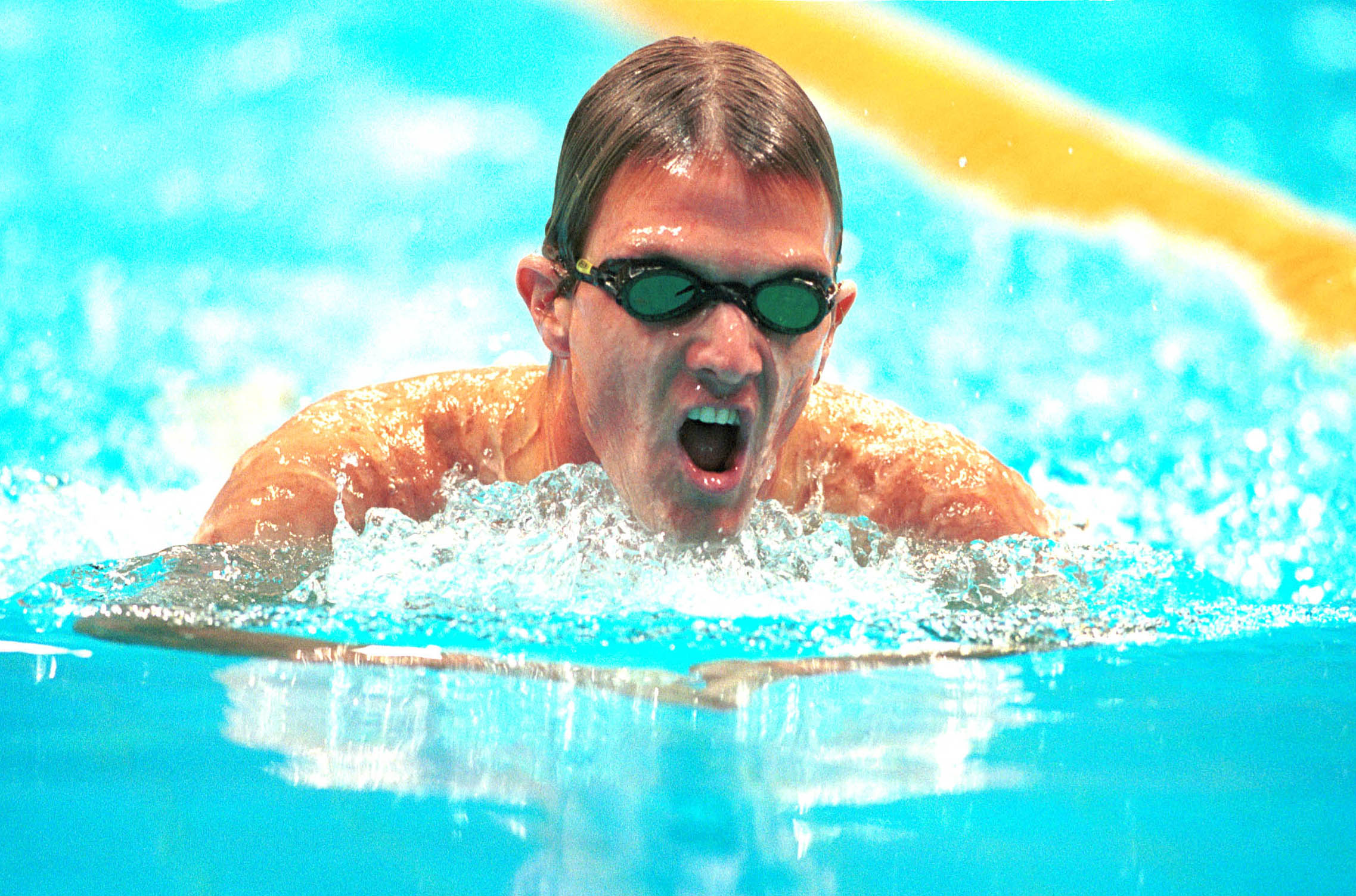
- Action shot of Harris in the pool at the 2000 Summer Paralympics

Personal information
- Full name: Alex James Harris
- Nickname: Shakey
- Nationality: Australian
- Born: 3 January 1975 Geelong, Victoria, Australia
- Died: 27 October 2009 (aged 34) Lara, Victoria, Australia

Sport
- Sport: Swimming
Medal record
Swimming
Representing Australia
Paralympic Games
Silver medal – second place	2000 Sydney	4×100 m freestyle 34pts
Silver medal – second place	2000 Sydney	100 m freestyle S7
Bronze medal – third place	2000 Sydney	50 m freestyle S7
Bronze medal – third place	2000 Sydney	4 x 100 m medley 34pts
IPC Swimming World Championships
Silver medal – second place	1998 Christchurch	Men's 50m Freestyle S7
Silver medal – second place	2002 Mar Del Plata	Men's 100 m Freestyle S7
Silver medal – second place	2002 Mar Del Plata	Men's 100 m Freestyle Relay 34 pts
Bronze medal – third place	2002 Mar Del Plata	Men's 50 m Freestyle S7

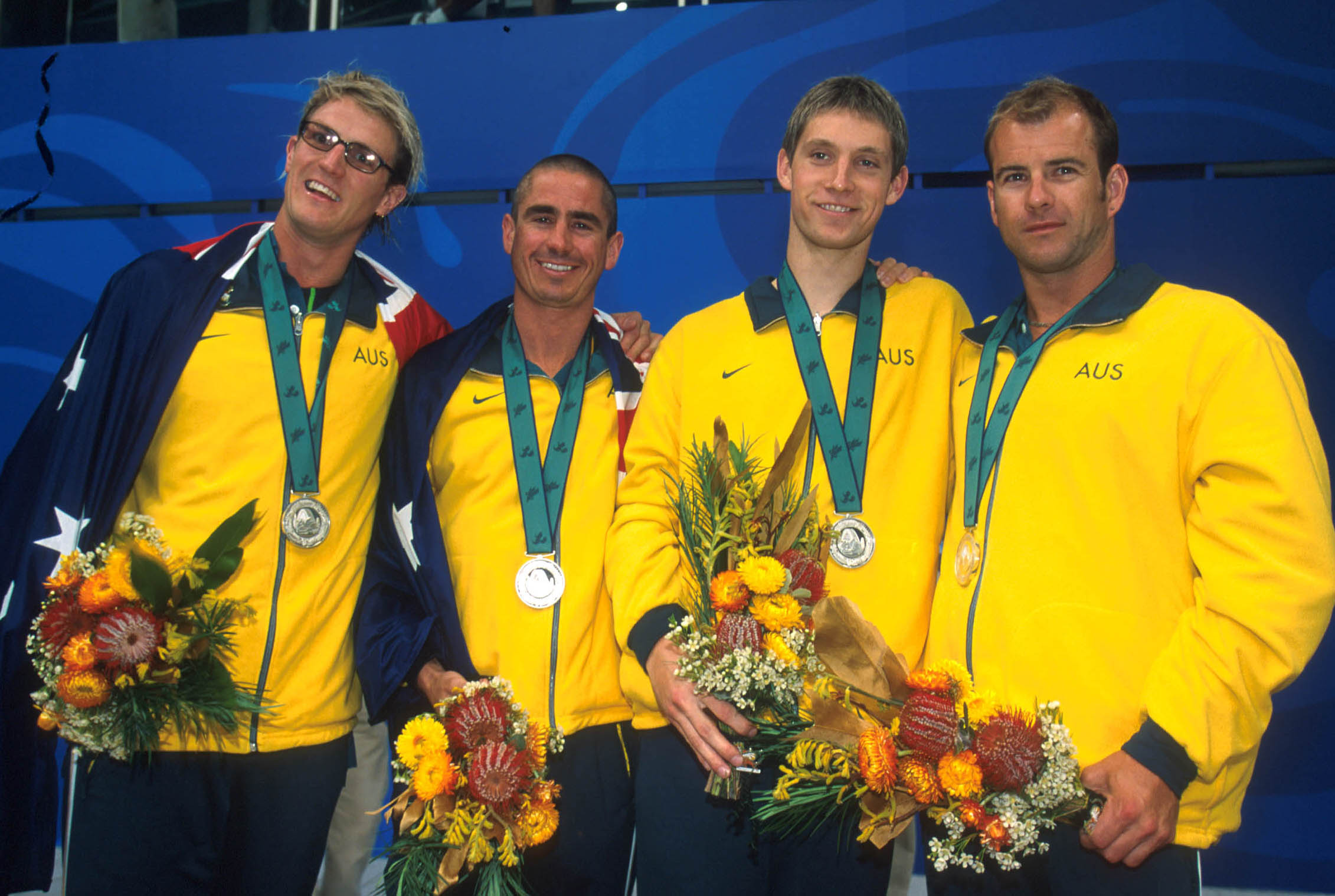
L–R: Australian swimmers Alex Harris, Cameron de Burgh, Ben Austin and Scott Brockenshire with their silver medals which they won as the Australian men's 4 × 100 m freestyle relay 34pts team at the 2000 Summer Paralympics

Alex James Harris (3 January 1975 – 27 October 2009) was an Australian Paralympic swimmer, who represented Australia at the 2000 Summer Paralympics in Sydney and the 2004 Summer Paralympics in Athens.

Harris was born in Geelong, Victoria, and attended Western Heights College where he was a champion sportsman and school captain. In 1993, aged 18, he was involved in a traffic collision at Breamlea when the car in which Harris and several friends were travelling was struck by another vehicle. One of the car's occupants was killed, and Harris was pulled from the car by a volunteer firefighter who heard the crash. He was airlifted to The Alfred Hospital in Melbourne, and was not expected to live. The accident left him with a closed head injury to his brain. Whilst undergoing physical therapy to enable him to walk again, Harris discovered that he could still swim very well.

Harris was selected to represent Australia in swimming at the 2000 Summer Paralympics in Sydney. He won a silver medal in the 100 m freestyle S7 and was a member of the 4 × 100 m freestyle 34 pts relay team which also won a silver medal. He won bronze medals in the 50 m freestyle S7 and in the 4 x 100 m medley. He competed in the 2002 Commonwealth Games in Manchester, coming 6th and 10th in the 50 m and 100 m freestyle MD events respectively. At the 2004 Summer Paralympics in Athens, Harris competed in four events (100 m breaststroke SB7, 100 m freestyle S7, 50 m butterfly S7, 50 m freestyle S7) but did not win further medals. He also participated in the 2006 Commonwealth Games in Melbourne.

Harris was due to undergo deep brain stimulation surgery in October 2009, which would have involved insertion of electrodes into his brain to calm his uncontrollable movements. On 27 October 2009, days before the operation was scheduled, Harris took his own life by being struck by a train on a level crossing at Lara, Victoria.

Harris was a member of the Australian swimming community known for both his swimming achievements and for his efforts outside the pool, inspiring and motivating other swimmers.
