= 2000 Summer Paralympics medal table =

List of medals won by Paralympic delegations

2000 Summer Paralympics medals
- Location: Sydney, Australia

Highlights
- Most gold medals: Australia (63)
- Most total medals: Australia (149)
- Medalling NPCs: 68

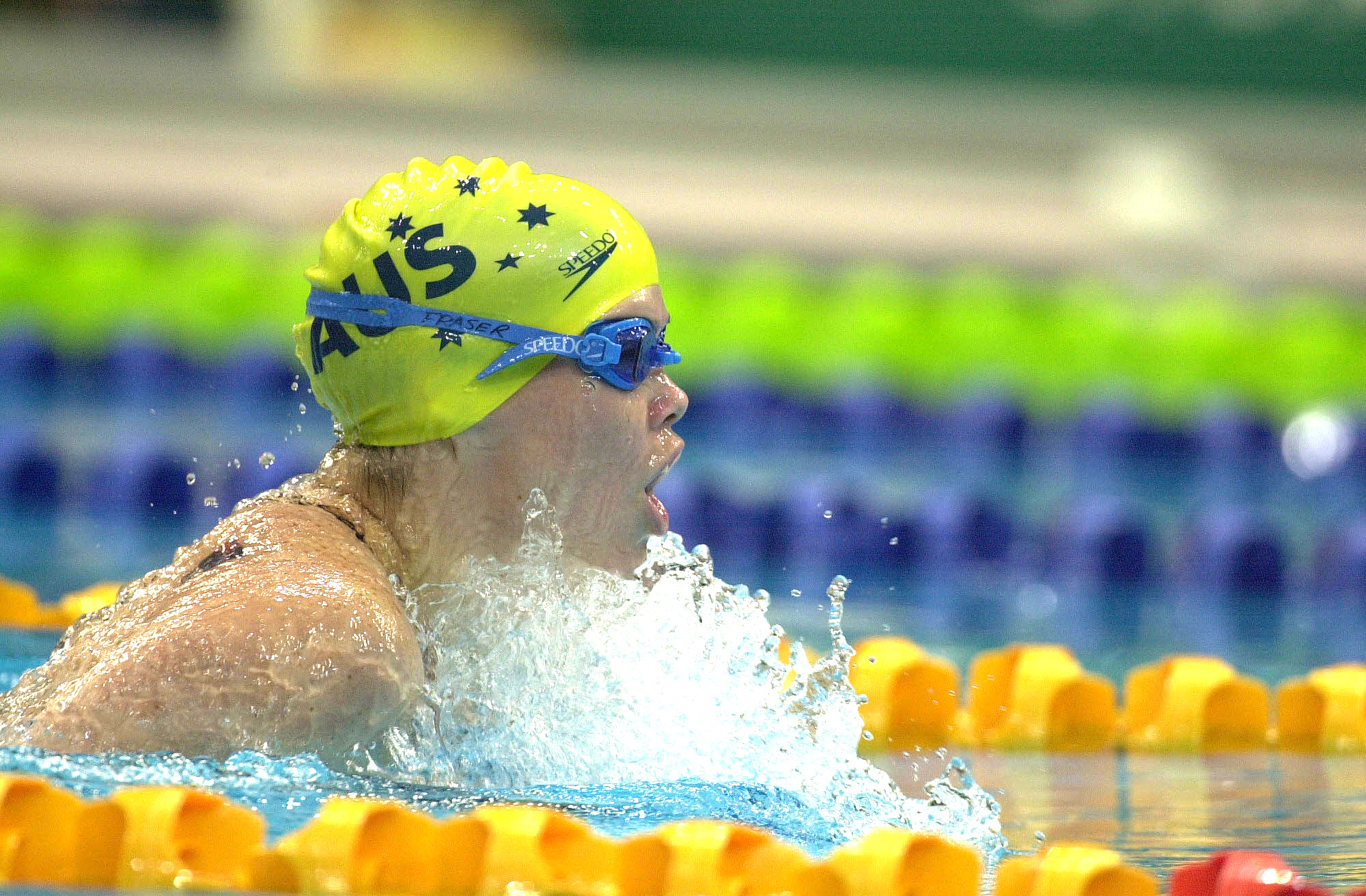
Australian swimmer Amanda Fraser competes in the S7 200IM at the Sydney 2000 Paralympic Games. She went on to win two bronze medals.

The medal table of the 2000 Summer Paralympics ranks the participating National Paralympic Committees (NPCs) by the number of gold medals won by their athletes during the competition. This was the eleventh Summer Paralympic Games, a quadrennial competition open to athletes with physical and intellectual disabilities. The Games were held in Sydney, Australia, from October 18 to October 29, 2000, the first time they had been held in the southern hemisphere. With 3,951 athletes taking part in the 18 sports on the programme, the Games were the second largest sporting event ever held in Australia until the 2006 Commonwealth Games. The location and facilities were shared with the largest event, the 2000 Summer Olympics, which concluded on 1 October. The Games set records for athlete and country participation, tickets sold, hits to the official Games website, and medals on offer.

A record of 122 countries (or 123 delegations including independent athletes from Timor-Leste) participated; 68 countries won medals, of which seven won a medal for the first time. A total of 1,657 medals were awarded during the Sydney games: 550 gold, 549 silver, and 558 bronze. Among these performances, over 300 world and Paralympic records were set. The host country, Australia, topped the table with more golds and more medals overall than any other nation, and achieved its record medal count. Great Britain won the most silvers, with 43, and tied Australia for the most bronzes, with 47. The medals were designed by the royal goldsmith and jeweller Stuart Devlin. They feature the Sydney Harbour Bridge and Opera House, surrounded by the Games Main venues. The reverse face shows the International Paralympic Committee (IPC) and the Games logos.

There were numerous athletes who contributed multiple medals to their national tally. In the pool these included Béatrice Hess of France who won seven golds, Mayumi Narita of Japan who won six golds and a silver, Siobhan Paton of Australia who won six golds in individual events, and Stéphanie Dixon of Canada and Hong Yan Zhu of China who each won five golds. On the track Tim Sullivan of Australia won five golds, and Tanni Grey-Thompson of Great Britain won four.

== Medal table ==
The ranking in this table is based on information provided by the IPC and is consistent with IPC convention in its published medal tables. By default, the table is ordered by the number of gold medals the athletes from a nation have won (in this context, a "nation" is an entity represented by a National Paralympic Committee). The number of silver medals is next considered, followed by the number of bronze medals. If nations remain tied, they are ranked equally and listed alphabetically by IPC country code.

With a few exceptions, each event contributed one medal of each type to the table (although for team events, multiple physical medals were actually awarded). All judo events awarded two bronze medals, one to each of the losing semi-finalists. There was a tie in the men's 100 m backstroke S8 event with two gold medals being awarded and only one bronze medal to the third placed athlete. In the intellectual disability basketball event, although three medals were initially awarded, the gold was later stripped from the Spanish team due to a disqualification for cheating.

2000 Summer Paralympics medal table
Rank	Nation	Gold	Silver	Bronze	Total
1	Australia (AUS)*	63	39	47	149
2	Great Britain (GBR)	41	43	47	131
3	Canada (CAN)	38	33	25	96
4	Spain (ESP)	38	29	38	105
5	United States (USA)	36	39	34	109
6	China (CHN)	34	22	17	73
7	France (FRA)	30	28	28	86
8	Poland (POL)	19	24	10	53
9	South Korea (KOR)	18	7	7	32
10	Germany (GER)	16	41	38	95
11	Czech Republic (CZE)	15	15	13	43
12	Russia (RUS)	14	9	12	35
13	Japan (JPN)	13	17	11	41
14	South Africa (RSA)	13	12	13	38
15	Netherlands (NED)	12	9	9	30
16	Iran (IRI)	12	4	7	23
17	Mexico (MEX)	10	12	12	34
18	Italy (ITA)	9	8	10	27
19	Denmark (DEN)	8	8	14	30
20	Switzerland (SUI)	8	4	8	20
21	Hong Kong (HKG)	8	3	7	18
22	Nigeria (NGR)	7	1	5	13
23	Egypt (EGY)	6	12	10	28
24	Brazil (BRA)	6	10	6	22
25	New Zealand (NZL)	6	8	4	18
26	Portugal (POR)	6	5	6	17
27	Tunisia (TUN)	6	4	1	11
28	Belarus (BLR)	5	8	10	23
29	Sweden (SWE)	5	6	10	21
30	Thailand (THA)	5	4	2	11
31	Ireland (IRL)	5	3	1	9
32	Hungary (HUN)	4	5	14	23
33	Greece (GRE)	4	4	3	11
34	Cuba (CUB)	4	2	2	8
35	Ukraine (UKR)	3	20	14	37
36	Slovakia (SVK)	3	5	5	13
37	Israel (ISR)	3	2	1	6
38	Algeria (ALG)	3	0	0	3
39	Austria (AUT)	2	7	6	15
40	Norway (NOR)	2	6	7	15
41	Iceland (ISL)	2	0	2	4
42	Belgium (BEL)	1	4	4	9
43	Finland (FIN)	1	3	6	10
44	Chinese Taipei (TPE)	1	2	4	7
45	Estonia (EST)	1	1	3	5
46	Kenya (KEN)	1	1	2	4
47	Peru (PER)	1	1	0	2
48	Ivory Coast (CIV)	1	0	1	2
49	Bulgaria (BUL)	1	0	0	1
49	Jordan (JOR)	1	0	0	1
49	Zimbabwe (ZIM)	1	0	0	1
52	Faroe Islands (FRO)	0	3	1	4
52	United Arab Emirates (UAE)‡	0	3	1	4
54	Argentina (ARG)	0	2	3	5
55	Slovenia (SLO)	0	2	2	4
56	Lithuania (LTU)	0	2	1	3
57	Kuwait (KUW)	0	1	4	5
58	Bahrain (BRN)	0	1	1	2
58	Panama (PAN)	0	1	1	2
60	Azerbaijan (AZE)‡	0	1	0	1
60	Bosnia and Herzegovina (BIH)‡	0	1	0	1
60	Yugoslavia (YUG)	0	1	0	1
63	Latvia (LAT)‡	0	0	3	3
64	Libya (LBA)‡	0	0	1	1
64	Palestine (PLE)‡	0	0	1	1
64	Philippines (PHI)‡	0	0	1	1
64	Puerto Rico (PUR)	0	0	1	1
64	Venezuela (VEN)	0	0	1	1
Totals (68 entries)		552	548	558	1,658

‡ First-time medal-winning country

== See also ==
- 2000 Summer Olympics medal table
