= Juan Francisco Jiménez Romano =

Spanish Paralympic swimmer

Juan Jimenez
Personal information
- Full name: Juan Francisco Jimenez Romano
- Nationality: Spanish
- Born: 16 March 1981 (age 45) Castelló de la Plana, Castellón, Spain

Sport
- Country: Spain
- Sport: Swimming (S8)
Medal record
Swimming
Representing Spain
Paralympic Games
Silver medal – second place	1996 Atlanta	400m freestyle S8
Silver medal – second place	2000 Sydney	400m freestyle S8
Bronze medal – third place	1996 Atlanta	100m freestyle S8
Bronze medal – third place	1996 Atlanta	4x100m freestyle relay S7-10
Bronze medal – third place	2000 Sydney	100m freestyle S8

Juan Francisco Jimenez Romano (born 16 March 1981 in Castelló de la Plana, Castellón) is an S8 swimmer from Spain. He competed at the 1996 Summer Paralympics, winning a bronze medal in the 4 x 100 meter 34 Points freestyle men's race. He competed at the 2000 Summer Paralympics, winning a silver medal in the 400 meter freestyle and a bronze medal in the 100 metre freestyle.
