= Lynfield College =

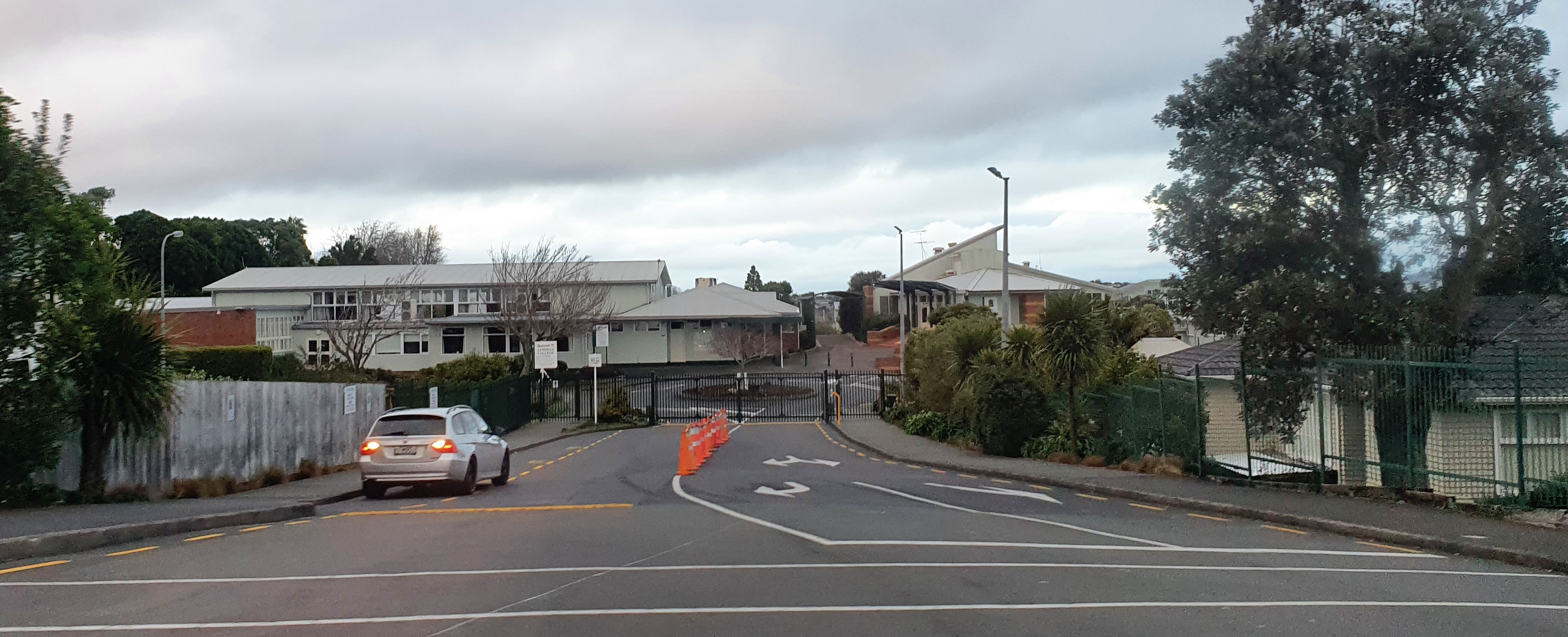

Location
- White Swan Road, Mt Roskill, Auckland; 36.9202°S 174.7161°E

Information
- Type: State coed secondary, years 9–13
- Motto: Latin: Disce Vivere "Learn to Live"
- Established: 1958
- Ministry of Education Institution no.: 75
- Chairperson: Luke Jackson
- Principal: Ms Cath Knell
- Enrolment: 2,017 (July 2026)
- Socio-economic decile: 6N
- Website: lynfield.school.nz

Lynfield College is a secondary education provider in Lynfield, Auckland, New Zealand. It celebrated its 50th anniversary in 2008.

The Principal of Lynfield College is Ms Cath Knell.

The school practices NCEA for assessments and examinations, and has high achievement rates compared to the national average.

== History ==
Lynfield College opened its doors for the first time in 1958. Originally planned to be called Blockhouse Bay High School, it was renamed Lynfield by parents and teachers associated with the school. The name Lynfield was taken from the poultry farm run by Sir Alfre Bankart, that was formerly opposite the school's main entrance.

Gilletta Road in Lynfield was named after Bankheart's wife's maiden name. Another owner of the property was Mr. Irvine. He diversified from farming poultry to founding the giant baking and pastry firm Irvines Bakery.

The 26 acres (110,000 m^{2}) on which the school now stands has seen a variety of activities – gum-digging, dairy farming, pig and poultry farming. In 1900 Messes Cooper and Mr Edwards began commercial strawberry growing. In 1911, Mr Cooper married and divided the land, keeping the half that bordered Boundary Road and Mr Edwards the other half which exited onto White Swan Road. In the 1950s, owners of the land sold portions to make way for Auckland's 20th Secondary School (to be possibly named Roskill South High School).There is a plough on the school's crest, to symbolise the use of the land it is located on as previously being a strawberry field.

== Enrolment ==
As of July 2026, Lynfield College has a roll of 2,017 students, of which 117 (5.8%) identify as Māori.

As of 2026, the school has an Equity Index of 417, placing it amongst schools whose students have few socioeconomic barriers to achievement (roughly equivalent to deciles 8 and 9 under the former socio-economic decile system).

== Principals ==
- Des Thurston 1958–1972
- Ian Hayter 1972–1984
- Jim Sinclair 1985–2002
- Steve Bovaird 2002–2017
- Cath Knell 2017–present

== Notable alumni ==
- Daniel Bedingfield – singer
- Natasha Bedingfield – singer
- Trent Bray – swimmer
- Dean Booth – paralympic swimmer
- Rita Fatialofa-Paloto – netball and softball player
- Beatrice Faumuina – athlete
- Warwick Henderson – art gallerist, author
- Sam Kaleta – rugby union player
- Tyla Nathan-Wong – rugby league player
- Ralph Norris – businessman
- Henry Perenara – rugby league player and referee
- Lisa Reihana – artist
- Maddi Wesche – athlete
- Helen Winkelmann – current chief justice
- Chris Zoricich – footballer
- Dylan Schmidt – olympic trampolinist
- Maddi Wesche - shotputter
