= Hector Lopéz Alonso =

Spanish swimmer

Hector Lopéz
Personal information
- Full name: Hector Lopéz Alonso
- Nationality: Spanish
- Born: 19 August 1979 (age 46) Reinosa, Cantabria, Spain

Sport
- Country: Spain
- Sport: Swimming (S2)
Medal record
Swimming
Representing Spain
Paralympic Games
Gold medal – first place	2000 Sydney	50m backstroke S2
World Championships
Bronze medal – third place	1998 Christchurch	50m backstroke S4

Hector Lopéz Alonso (born August 19, 1979, in Reinosa, Cantabria) is an S2 swimmer from Spain. He competed at the 2000 Summer Paralympics, winning a gold medal in the 50 meter backstroke race.
