= Alicia Aberley =

Australian Paralympic swimmer

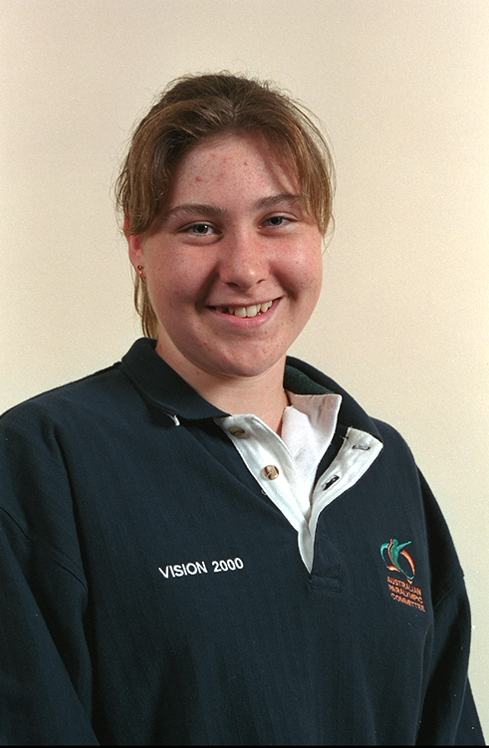
- 2000 Australian Paralympic team portrait of Aberley

Personal information
- Nationality: Australia
- Born: 29 March 1984 (age 42) Riverstone, New South Wales, Australia
Medal record
Swimming
Paralympic Games
| Silver medal – second place | 2000 Sydney | Women's 100 m Freestyle S14 |
| Silver medal – second place | 2000 Sydney | Women's 200 m Medley SM14 |
| Bronze medal – third place | 2000 Sydney | Women's 50 m Breaststroke SB14 |
| Bronze medal – third place | 2000 Sydney | Women's 200 m Freestyle S14 |
IPC Swimming World Championships
| Gold medal – first place | 1998 Christchurch | Women's 4 x 100 m Freestyle S14 |
| Gold medal – first place | 1998 Christchurch | 4 x 50 m Medley S14 |
| Bronze medal – third place | 1998 Christchurch | Women's 100 m Freestyle S14 |
| Bronze medal – third place | 1998 Christchurch | Women's 200 m Freestyle S14 |
| Bronze medal – third place | 1998 Christchurch | Women's 50 m Breaststroke SB14 |

Alicia Aberley (born 29 March 1984) is an Australian swimmer with an intellectual disability. She represented Australia at the 2000 Summer Paralympics, where she won several medals, and is a multiple world record holder.

== Personal ==
Aberley was born on 29 March 1984 in the Sydney suburb of Riverstone. Her family has lived in the Riverstone Township for several decades. In Aberley's pre-2001 swimming career, her family could not afford to attend international competitions that she participated in. Aberley could not afford a way to nicely display her many medals at her house, so they were put into storage around the house instead of being on display. Alicia did not grow up with a lot of money.

Aberley is a student and a journalist. She attended Riverstone High School. In 2000, she completed year ten at Riverstone High School and passed her year ten exams.

Aberley was a single mother of a son. She later became involved with someone who helped her raise her son. She is self-employed through Amway. After eighteen months of working for Amway, she became a gold level producer.

== Competitive swimming ==
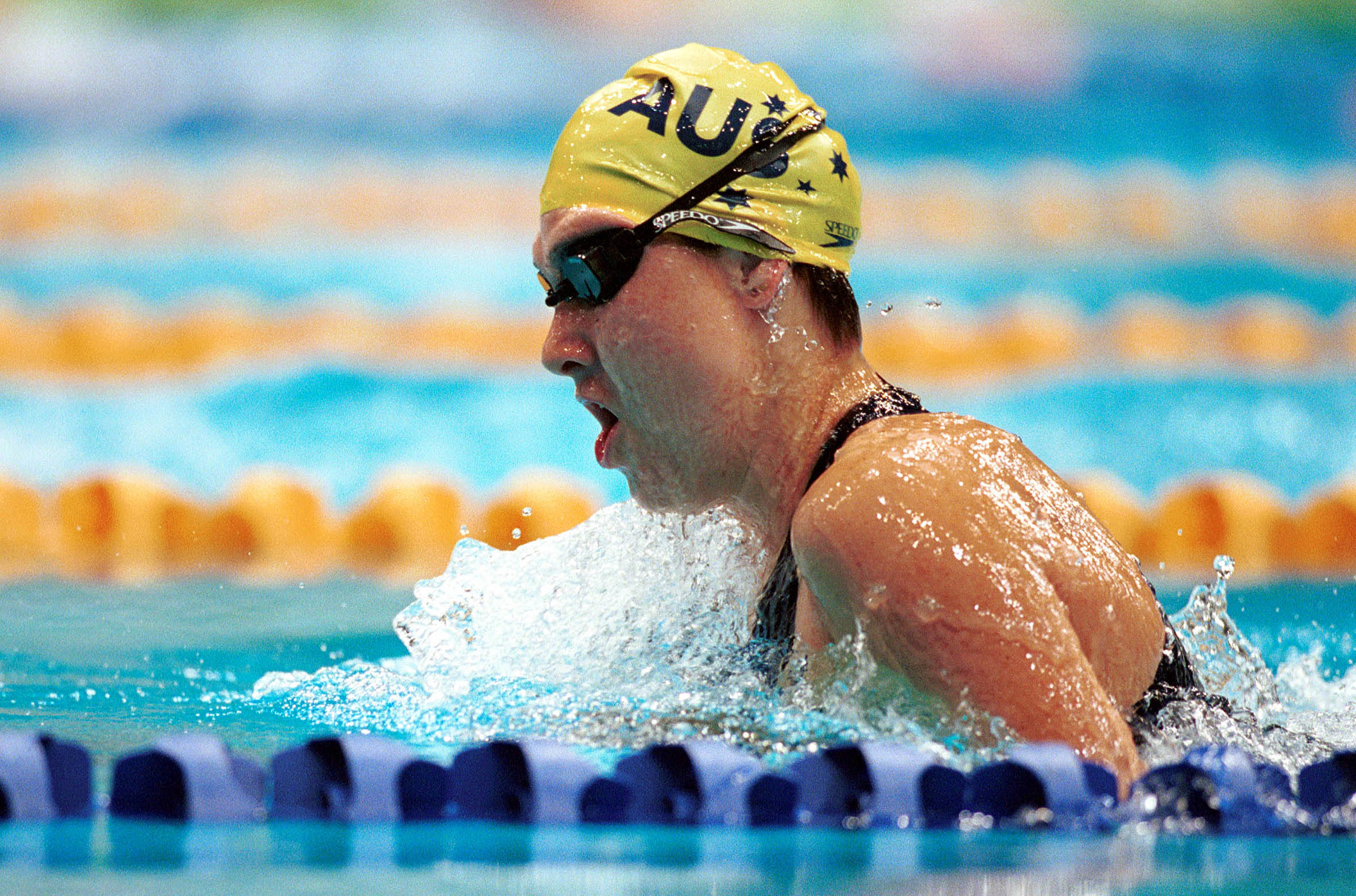
Action shot of Aberley doing breaststroke at the 2000 Summer Paralympics

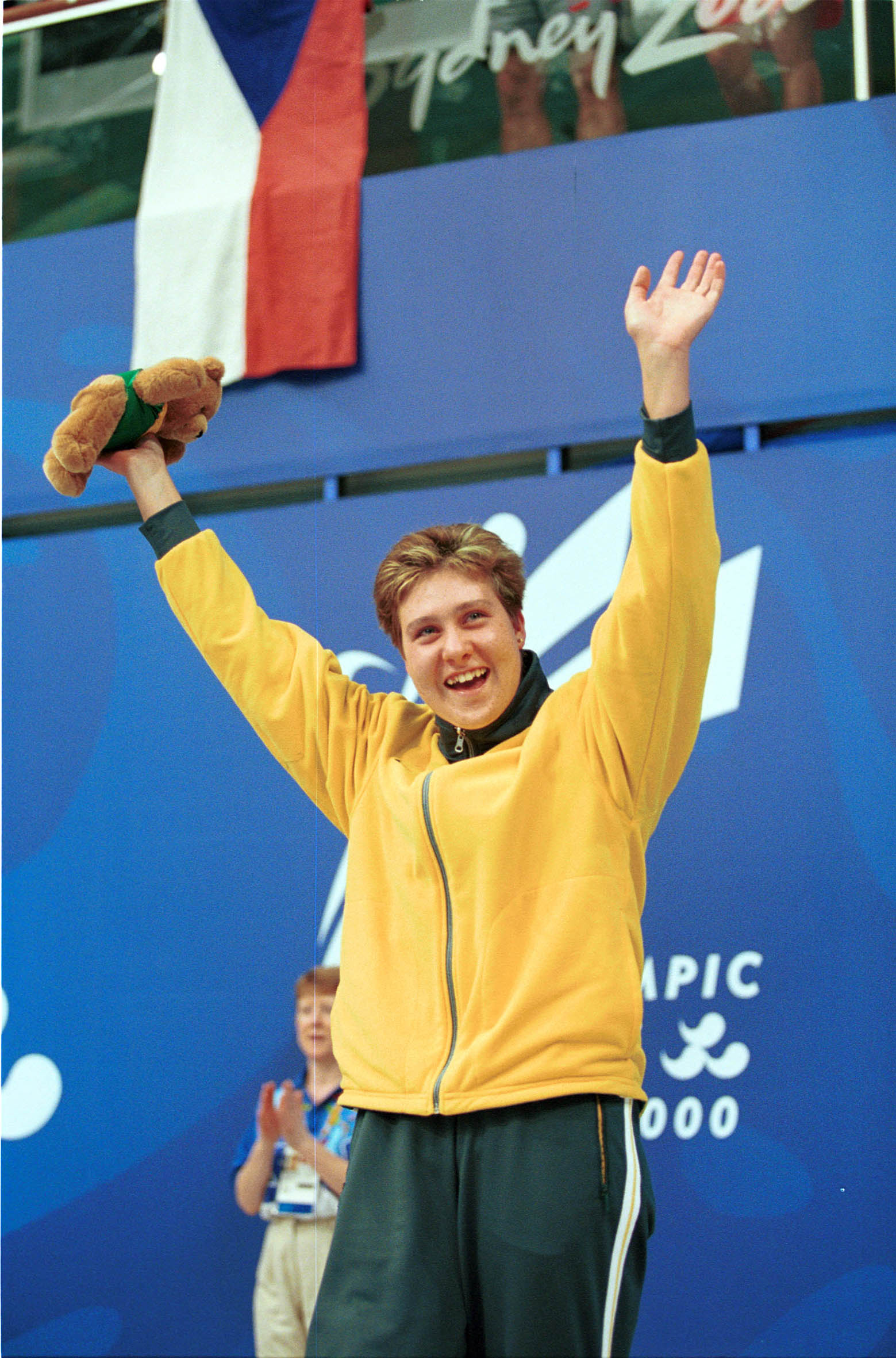
Aberley waves to fans as she celebrates one of her bronze medal wins at the 2000 Summer Paralympics

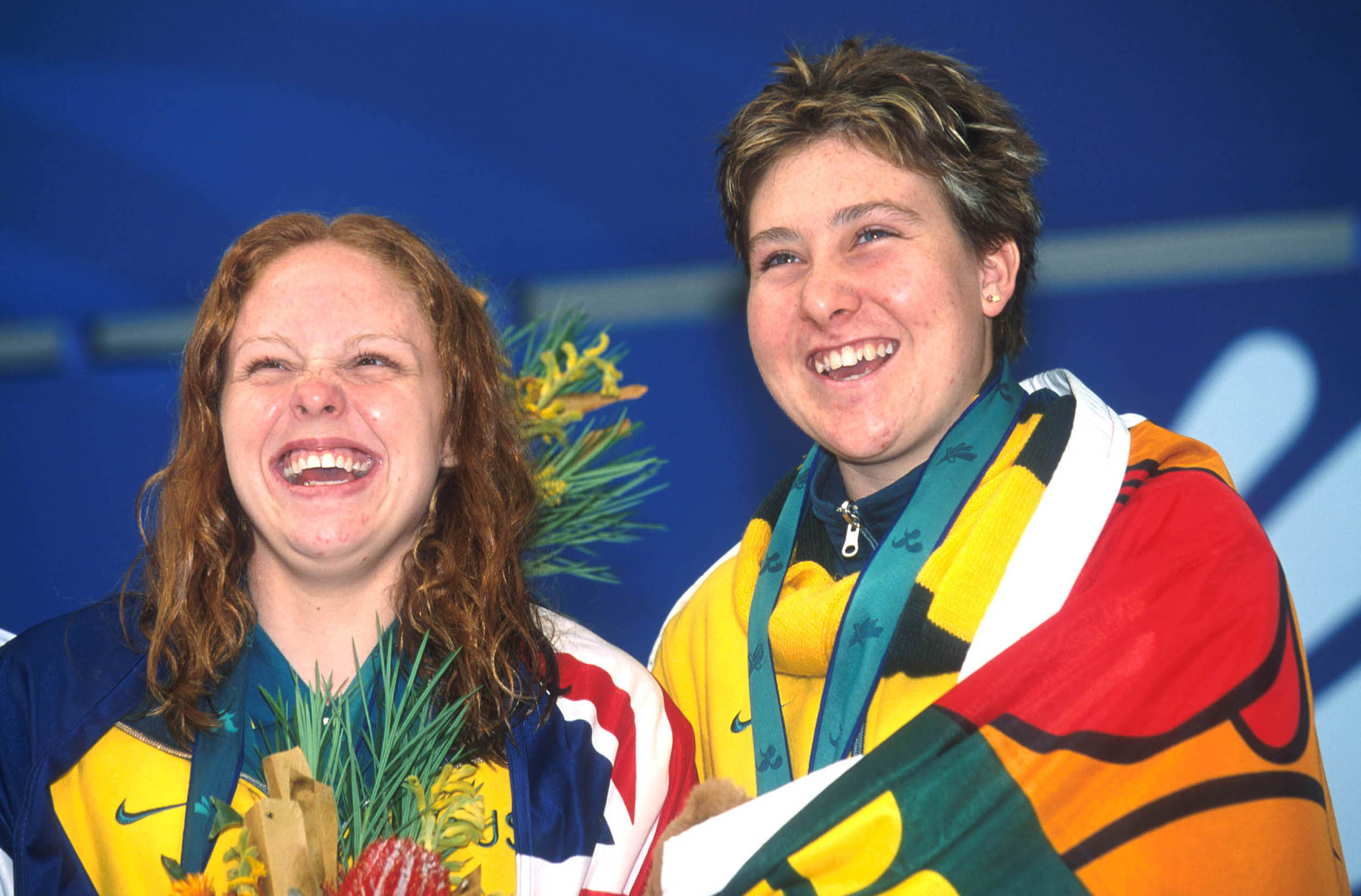
Aberley (right) and fellow Australian swimmer Siobhan Paton smiling and celebrating their achievements on the medal podium at the 2000 Summer Paralympics

Aberley started swimming in 1995. At the 1998 national championships, she finished second in the women's 100 m breaststroke intellectually disabled event. She competed at the 1998 International Paralympic Committee world swimming championships in Christchurch as a member of the women's 4x100 m relay team, where she won a gold medal with her teammates; Siobhan Paton, Petrea Barker and Bernadette Morris. At the 1999 Telstra Australian National Championships, she won a gold medal and broke a world record in the women's 100 m breaststroke event. By 2000, she had won medals at events on many levels including local, state, national and international. In 2000, prior to the start of the Paralympics, she competed at a swimming event in Amsterdam, where she won gold medals in several events including the 100 m breaststroke and 200 m freestyle. At the same event, she won three silver medals in the 200 m individual medley and the 50 and 100 m freestyle events.

As a school representative, Aberley competed in the 2000 Pacific School Games Team. This event helped with her Paralympic team selection.

At the 2000 Sydney Games, she won two silver medals in the Women's 100 m Freestyle S14 and Women's 200 m Medley SM14 events and two bronze medals in the Women's 200 m freestyle S14 and Women's 50 m breaststroke SB14 events. At the 2000 games, she competed in several other events in which she did not win medals. They included the 50 m freestyle event where she finished fifth, the 50 m backstroke event where she finished sixth, the 100 m freestyle event where she finished seventh, and the 50 m butterfly where she did not qualify for the final.

Aberley was coached by Greg McWhirter of Baulkham Hills. In 2002, Aberley competed at the 2002 Telstra Australian Championships. She won the multidisability 100 m breaststroke event, with a time of 01:22.99. She represented The Hill swim club. She also competed at the 2003 competition in the Women's 100 m freestyle multi-disability event.

Aberley has held several world and Australian records in swimming. They include the world record for the 100 m and 200 m breaststroke events. She held the 16-year-old age world record for the 50 m, 100 m and 200 m breaststroke. Her Australian national records are for the 50 m, 100 m and 200 m breaststroke events.

== Recognition ==
On 23 August 2000, she was awarded the Australian Sports Medal for world record achievements. In 2000, she was named the Sportsperson of the Year by the Blacktown City Council. In 2001, she was named the Telstra Swimmer of the Year with a Disability. That year, she also received a Telstra SWD (swimmers with a disability) Scholarship. In December 2000, a time capsule was buried at Riverstone High School that was to be dug up by current students in 25 years time. The time capsule included newspaper articles about Aberley and Olympic torchbearer Melissa Bushby, both of whom attended the school. In August 2009, she was rewarded with Platinum IBO recognition from Amway.
