= Sakuko Kato =

Japanese Paralympic swimmer

Medal record

Women's swimming

Representing Japan

Paralympic Games
| Gold medal – first place | 2000 Sydney | 4x50 m freestyle relay 20 pts |

Sakuko Kato (加藤 作子, Katō Sakuko) is a Paralympic swimmer from Japan competing mainly in category S5 events.

Sakuko was a freestyle specialist who competed in the 2000 Summer Paralympics, she was part of the 4x50m freestyle team that won the gold medal in a new world record time. Individually she swam in the 50m, 100m and 200m freestyle events but failed to make a final.
