= Sam Kaleta =

Samoa & Japan international rugby union player

- Born: Samuel Puni Kaleta; 9 March 1966 (age 60) Auckland, New Zealand

Rugby union career
- Position: Flanker
Amateur team(s)
Years	Team	Apps	(Points)
1990	Kia Toa RFC		
Senior career
Years	Team	Apps	(Points)
1992–1994	Ricoh		
1994–1997	Ponsonby RFC		
1997–1999	Mitsubishi Sagamihara DynaBoars		
19–2004	Perthshire RFC		
Provincial / State sides
Years	Team	Apps	(Points)
1990	Manawatu	8	(4)
International career
Years	Team	Apps	(Points)
1992–1993	Japan	4	(0)
1994–1997	Samoa	7	(5)

Samuel Puni Kaleta, known as Sam Kaleta (born 9 March 1966 in Auckland) is a former New-Zealand born Samoan rugby union player who played also for Japan. He played as a flanker.

== Career ==
Kaleta graduated from Lynfield College in Auckland. During his playing career, he played for the New Zealand clubs Kia Toa RFC and Ponsonby RFC, as well as for the Japanese clubs Ricoh Black Rams and Mitsubishi Sagamihara Dynaboars. In 1991 he played for the NZ Combined Services team of the New Zealand Defence Force and Police as lock. He finished his career in 2004 for Perthshire RFC.

His first cap for Japan was against Hong Kong, in Seoul, on 26 September 1992, playing four matches. In 1994, Kaleta decided to play for Samoa, his country of heritage; his first cap for the Manu Samoa was in the match against Wales, at Moamoa, on 4 June 1994. He also was part of the 1995 Rugby World Cup roster, although he did not play a match during the tournament. His last cap in his career was against Fiji, in Apia, on 5 July 1997.

In 2006, Kaleta joined the staff of Perthshire RFC and took responsibility for the club's academy. For some time he was the team's player-coach, even entering the field in 2008.
