= Poland at the 2000 Summer Paralympics =

- IPC code: POL
- NPC: Polish Paralympic Committee
- Website: www.paralympic.org.pl

in Sydney
- Competitors: 113
- Medals Ranked 8th: Gold 19 Silver 22 Bronze 12 Total 53

Summer Paralympics appearances (overview)
- 1972; 1976; 1980; 1984; 1988; 1992; 1996; 2000; 2004; 2008; 2012; 2016; 2020; 2024

Poland competed at the 2000 Summer Paralympics in Sydney, Australia. 113 competitors from Poland won 53 medals, including 19 gold, 22 silver and 12 bronze to finish 8th in the medal table.

== Medal table ==
Medal	Name	Sport	Event
Gold	Andrzej Wrobel	Athletics	Men's 1500m T37
Gold	Waldemar Kikolski	Athletics	Men's marathon T12
Gold	Robert Chyra	Athletics	Men's discus F37
Gold	Miroslaw Pych	Athletics	Men's javelin F12
Gold	Krzysztof Kaczmarek	Athletics	Men's shot put F20
Gold	Krzysztof Smorszczewski	Athletics	Men's shot put F56
Gold	Miroslaw Pych	Athletics	Men's pentathlon P12
Gold	Malgorzata Kleemann	Athletics	Women's 100m T20
Gold	Barbara Bieganowska	Athletics	Women's 800m T20
Gold	Ewa Durska	Athletics	Women's shot put F20
Gold	Maciej Maik	Swimming	Men's 100m backstroke S10
Gold	Piotr Skrobut	Table tennis	Men's singles 11
Gold	Dariusz Pender	Wheelchair fencing	Men's épée individual A
Gold	Jadwiga Polasik	Wheelchair fencing	Women's épée individual A
Gold	Robert Wysmierski	Wheelchair fencing	Men's sabre individual B
Gold	Marta Wyrzykowska	Wheelchair fencing	Women's épée individual B
Gold	Jadwiga Polasik; Agnieszka Rozkres; Marta Wyrzykowska	Wheelchair fencing	Women's épée team
Gold	Marta Wyrzykowska	Wheelchair fencing	Women's foil individual B
Gold	Marta Wyrzykowska; Agnieszka Rozkres; Jadwiga Polasik	Wheelchair fencing	Women's foil team
Silver	Małgorzata Olejnik	Archery	Women's individual standing
Silver	Daniel Wozniak	Athletics	Men's 400m T12
Silver	Leszek Reut	Athletics	Men's high jump F12
Silver	Anna Szymul	Athletics	Women's 100m T46
Silver	Anna Szymul	Athletics	Women's 400m T46
Silver	Arleta Meloch	Athletics	Women's 800m T20
Silver	Joanna Gad	Athletics	Women's shot put F20
Silver	Ryszard Beczek	Swimming	Men's 50m freestyle S5
Silver	Pawel Penar	Swimming	Men's 100m backstroke S14
Silver	Maciej Maik	Swimming	Men's 100m breaststroke SB9
Silver	Robert Musiorski	Swimming	Men's 100m breaststroke SB12
Silver	Piotr Penar	Swimming	Men's 100m breaststroke SB14
Silver	Ryszard Beczek	Swimming	Men's 100m freestyle S5
Silver	Krzysztof Sleczka	Swimming	Men's 150m individual medley SM4
Silver	Ryszard Beczek	Swimming	Men's 200m freestyle S5
Silver	Maciej Maik	Swimming	Men's 200m individual medley SM10
Silver	Beata Drozdowska	Swimming	Women's 100m backstroke S9
Silver	Tomasz Wojtas	Swimming	Men's singles 11
Silver	Dariusz Pender; Tomasz Walisiewicz; Radoslaw Stanczuk; Piotr Czop	Wheelchair fencing	Men's foil team
Silver	Piotr Czop	Wheelchair fencing	Men's sabre individual B
Silver	Robert Wysmierski; Tomasz Walisiewicz; Piotr Czop; Arkadiusz Jablonski	Wheelchair fencing	Men's sabre team
Silver	Agnieszka Rozkres	Wheelchair fencing	Women's foil individual A
Bronze	Malgorzata Korzeniowska	Archery	Women's individual standing
Bronze	Tadeusz Chudzynski	Athletics	Men's 1500m T20
Bronze	Jacek Przebierala	Athletics	Men's javelin F37
Bronze	Anna Szymul	Athletics	Women's 200m T46
Bronze	Krzysztof Sleczka	Swimming	Men's 50m backstroke S5
Bronze	Miroslaw Piesak	Swimming	Men's 50m freestyle S2
Bronze	Arkadiusz Pawlowski	Swimming	Men's 200m individual medley SM5
Bronze	Robert Musiorski	Swimming	Men's 400m freestyle S13
Bronze	Pawel Penar; Piotr Penar; Pawel Lepko; Andrzej Gimier	Swimming	Men's 4x50m medley relay S14
Bronze	Patrycja Harajda	Swimming	Women's 100m backstroke S12
Bronze	Aneta Michalska	Swimming	Women's 400m freestyle S8

=== Basketball ID ===
After Spain's disqualification for cheating, Poland received the silver medal (previously bronze) while Russia received the gold medal (previously silver medal).

== See also ==
- Poland at the Paralympics
- Poland at the 2000 Summer Olympics
