= Sean Tretheway =

New Zealand Paralympic swimmer

Personal information
- Nationality: New Zealand
- Born: 11 July 1977 (age 48) Tauranga, New Zealand

Sport
- Sport: Swimming
- Strokes: Freestyle, Backstroke
- Classifications: S9 (classification)
Medal record
Men's para swimming
Representing New Zealand
Commonwealth Games
Bronze medal – third place	1994 Victoria	100 m Freestyle S9
Paralympic Games
Silver medal – second place	2000 Sydney	100 m Backstroke S9

Sean Tretheway (born 11 July 1977) is a retired paralympic swimmer from New Zealand who competed and won medals at the 1994 Commonwealth Games and the 2000 Summer Paralympic Games.

Tretheway raced in the classification class S9 as a right leg above knee amputee.

== Swimming career ==
=== 1994 Commonwealth Games ===
Tretheway competed at the 1994 Commonwealth Games held in Victoria, British Columbia. The event was the first time that para swimming events were included in the Commonwealth Games and were later integrated into the full programme at the 2002 Commonwealth Games held in Manchester.

At the event in 1994, Tretheway claimed the bronze medal in the 100 metre freestyle S9 in a time of 1:05.30 finishing behind Andrew Haley of Canada and Brendon Burkett from Australia.

=== 1998 World Championships ===
Tretheway competed at the 1998 World Para Swimming Championships held in Christchurch, New Zealand. Racing in the S9 category, he made the final of the 100 metre backstroke where he finished 4th and the 100 metre freestyle which he finished in 7th place. He also raced in the 200 metre individual medley and 50 metre freestyle in the heats.

=== 2000 Paralympic Games ===
At the 2000 Summer Paralympics in Sydney, Australia, Tretheway finished second in the 100 metre backstroke finishing behind Britain's James Crisp who set a new world record. He made the final of the 400 metre freestyle where he finished 8th overall, and the 100 metre freestyle but did not progress from the heats.

Following his retirement from swimming, Tretheway spent time as the manager of the Baywave Aquatic and Leisure Centre in Tauranga.
