= Stewart Pike =

Australian Paralympic swimmer

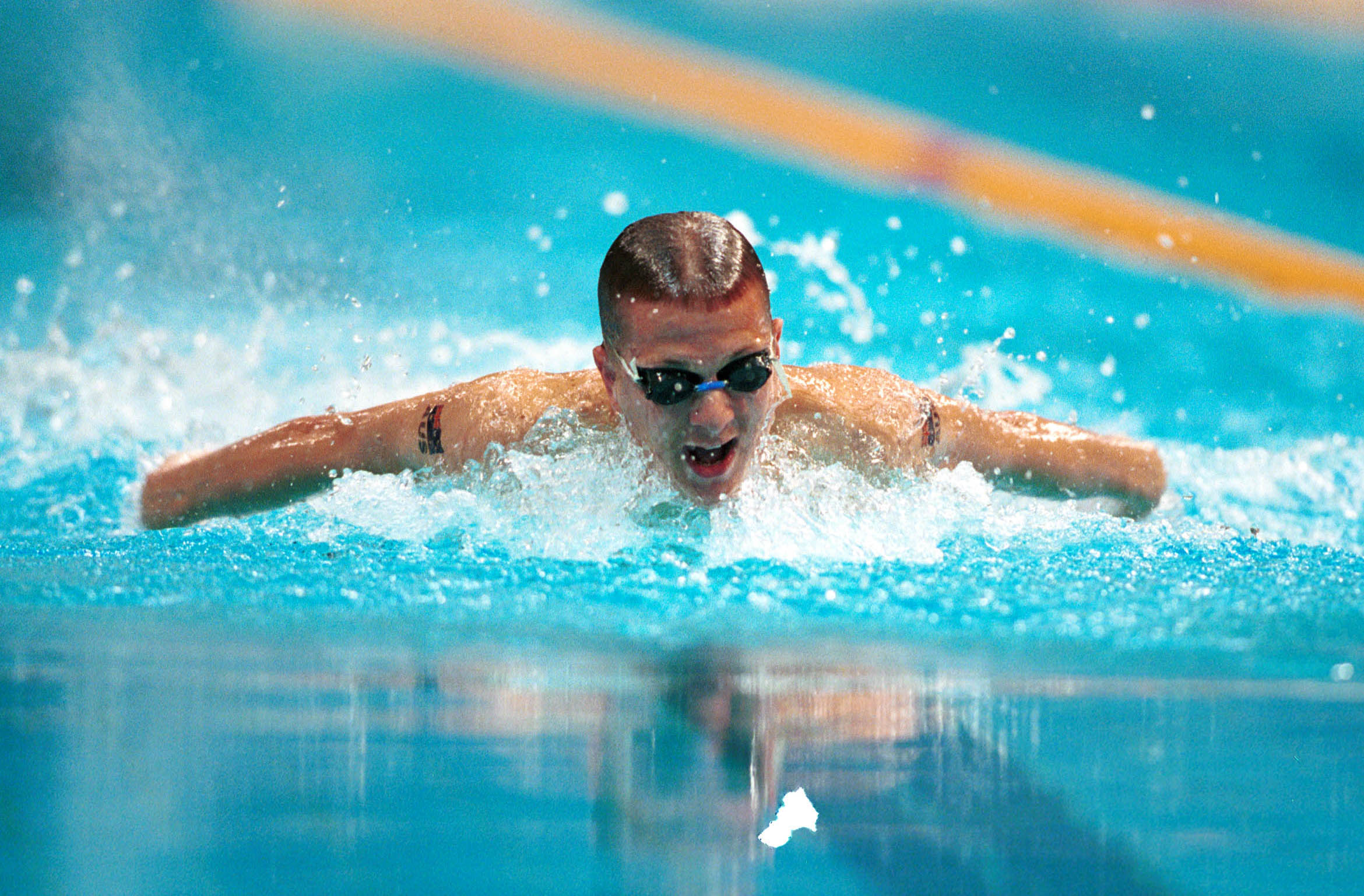
- Action shot of Pike in the pool during competition at the 2000 Summer Paralympics

Personal information
- Full name: Stewart Alan Pike
- Nationality: Australia
- Born: 1 June 1981 (age 45) Taree, New South Wales
Medal record
Swimming
Paralympic Games
| Gold medal – first place | 2000 Sydney | Men's 4x100 m Freestyle S14 |
| Silver medal – second place | 2000 Sydney | Men's 200 m Medley SM14 |

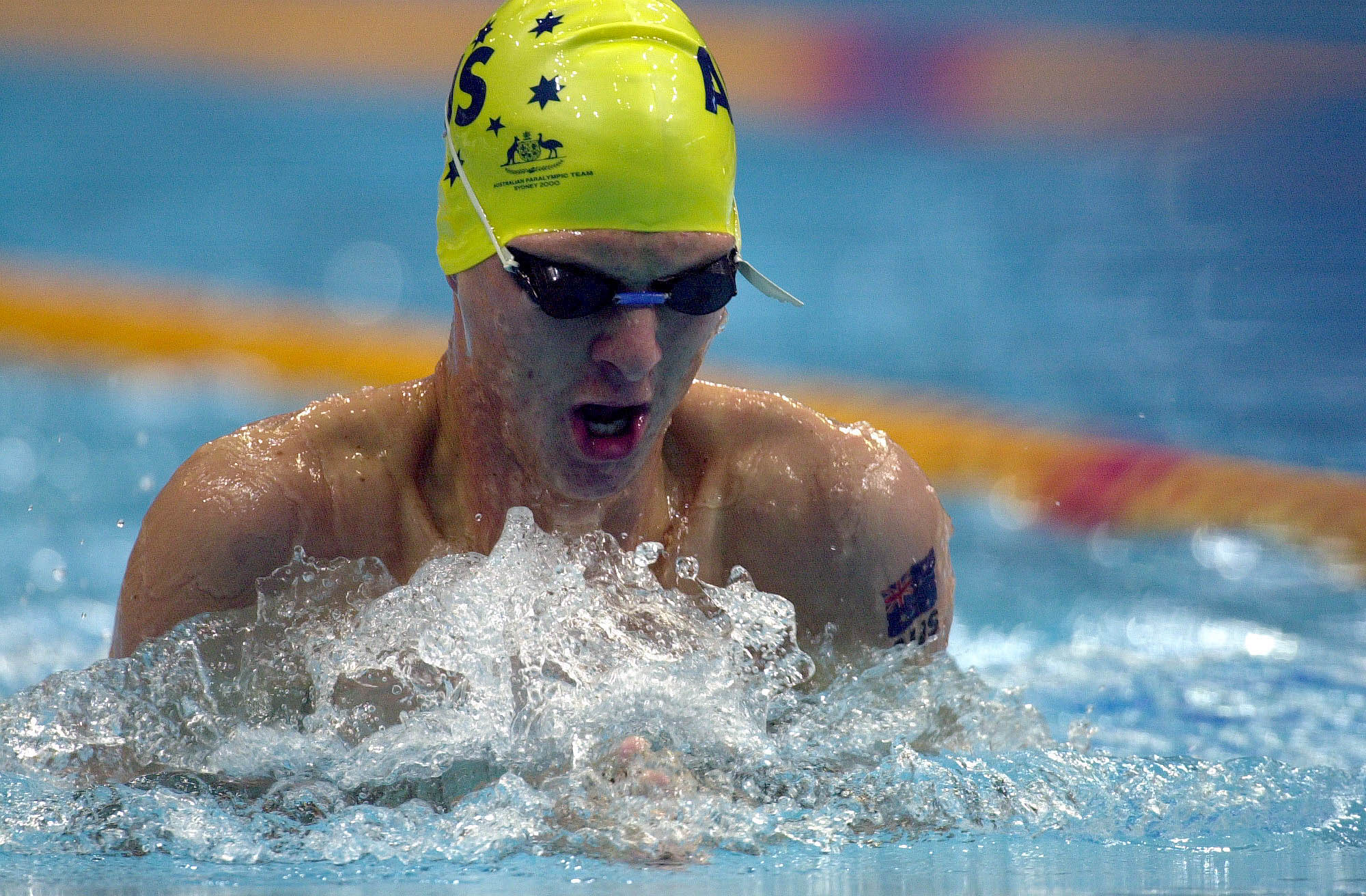
Pike on his way to a silver medal in the 200 m medley SM14 event, 2000 Summer Paralympics

Stewart Alan Pike, OAM (born on 1 June 1981) is an Australian Paralympic swimmer and was born in the New South Wales city of Taree. Pike has an intellectual disability and took up swimming to overcome his life frustrations. He attended Weston Primary School and Kurri Kurri High School. He won a gold medal at the 2000 Sydney Games in the Men's 4 × 100 m Freestyle S14 event, for which he received a Medal of the Order of Australia, and a silver medal in the Men's 200 m Medley SM14 event. In 2000, he received an Australian Sports Medal and an Australian Institute of Sport Athlete with a Disability scholarship. In 2001, he was awarded the Cessnock City Council Australia Day Sports Award. In 2006, he was an inaugural inductee in the Cessnock Hall of Fame.
