= Dean Booth =

New Zealand Paralympic swimmer

Medal record

Men's para swimming

Representing New Zealand

Paralympic Games
Gold medal – first place	2000 Sydney	400 m freestyle – S7
Bronze medal – third place	2000 Sydney	100 m freestyle – S7

Dean Booth, born in 1977, is a paralympic swimmer from New Zealand competing mainly in category S7 events.

== Biography ==
Booth attended Lynfield College in Auckland.

Booth was part of the New Zealand Paralympic swim team that made the short trip to Sydney for the 2000 Summer Paralympics. There he broke the world record and won the 400 m freestyle race narrowly beating Great Britain's David Roberts. Roberts got revenge in the 100 m freestyle where he won in a new games record while Booth finished third and 50 m freestyle where he broke the world record and Booth finished fourth.
