= Lauren Reynolds (swimmer) =

American swimmer

Lauren Reynolds is an American swimmer. She represented the United States in the 2000 Summer Paralympics in Sydney, Australia. In the 2000 Paralympic Games, she placed first in the 400 free and second in the 100 free and 4x100 free relay. Reynolds' first-place finish also broke the former 400 free relay record by nearly nine seconds.

Reynolds was educated at University of Illinois. In 2000, she was named the Wheelchair Sports USA's Female Athlete of the Year.
