= Gillian Pollock =

New Zealand Paralympic swimmer

Personal information
- Full name: Gillian Pollock
- Nationality: New Zealand
- Born: 1984 (age 41–42)

Sport
- Sport: Swimming
- Classifications: S8, SB8, SM8
- Club: Greendale Swim Club
- Coach: Noel Hardgrave-Booth
Medal record
Women's para swimming
Representing New Zealand
Paralympic Games
Silver medal – second place	2000 Sydney	200 m individual medley – SM8

Gillian Pollock (born 1984) is a former paralympic swimmer from New Zealand. She competed at the 2000 Summer Paralympic winning a silver medal.

Pollock was classified S8 for freestyle, backstroke and butterfly, SB8 for breaststroke and SM8 for medley.

At the IPC Swimming World Championships Christchurch 1998, Pollock gained three 4th-place finishes in the 200m metre individual medley, 100 metre backstroke and 100 metre butterfly.

Pollock was part of the New Zealand team that made the short trip to Sydney for the 2000 Summer Paralympics. There she won a silver medal in the 200 metre individual medley in a time of 3:04.12, behind Hungary's Dóra Pásztory who set a new games record. Gillian placed in the 100 metre backstroke finishing 5th and 400 metre freestyle finishing 6th . She also competed the 100 metre breaststroke and 100 metre butterfly although missed out on the finals.
