= Ruslan Burlakov =

Ukrainian Paralympic swimmer

Medal record

Women's swimming

Representing Ukraine

Paralympic Games
Bronze medal – third place	2000 Sydney	50 m freestyle S11
Bronze medal – third place	2000 Sydney	100 m freestyle S11

Ruslan Burlakov (Ukrainian: Руслан Бурлаков) is a paralympic swimmer from Ukraine, competing mainly in category S11 events.

Ruslan competed at the 2000 Summer Paralympics as part of the Ukrainian swimming team. She won bronze medals in both the 50m and 100m freestyle events. She also finished fifth in the 100m backstroke, fourth in the 200m medley, and was part of the Ukrainian 4 × 100 m medley team that finished fourth.
