= Melissa Carlton =

Australian Paralympic swimmer

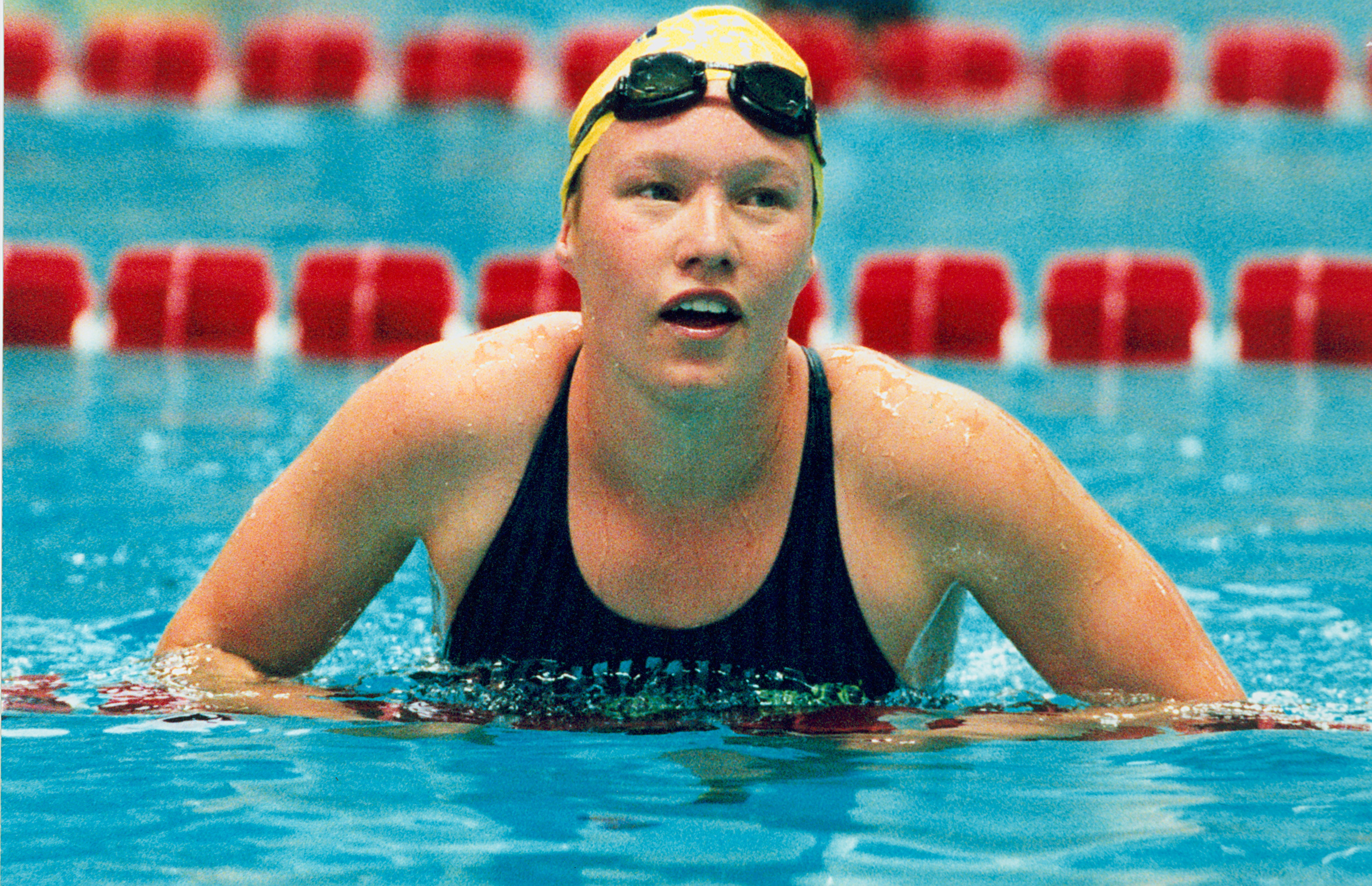
- Carlton at the 1996 Atlanta Paralympics

Personal information
- Full name: Melissa Paula Carlton
- Nationality: Australia
- Born: 8 May 1978 (age 48) Pietermaritzburg, South Africa
Medal record
Swimming
Commonwealth Games
| Gold medal – first place | 1994 Victoria | 100 m Freestyle S9 |
Paralympic Games
| Gold medal – first place | 1996 Atlanta | Women's 400 m Freestyle S9 |
| Gold medal – first place | 1996 Atlanta | Women's 4x100 m Freestyle S7–10 |
| Silver medal – second place | 1996 Atlanta | Women's 100 m Freestyle S9 |
| Silver medal – second place | 1996 Atlanta | Women's 100 m Butterfly S9 |
| Silver medal – second place | 2000 Sydney | Women's 100 m Freestyle S9 |
| Silver medal – second place | 2000 Sydney | Women's 400 m Freestyle S9 |
| Bronze medal – third place | 1996 Atlanta | Women's 100 m Backstroke S9 |
| Bronze medal – third place | 2000 Sydney | Women's 4x100 m Freestyle 34 pts |
| Bronze medal – third place | 2000 Sydney | Women's 4x100 m Medley 34 pts |
IPC Swimming World Championships
| Silver medal – second place | 1998 Christchurch | Women's 4 x 100m Freestyle Open |
| Bronze medal – third place | 1998 Christchurch | Women's 100 m Freestyle S9 |

Melissa Paula Carlton, OAM (born 8 May 1978) is a South African-born Australian swimmer. Born with no right leg and short fingers on her left hand, she won gold, silver and bronze medals for Australia at both the 1996 Atlanta and 2000 Sydney Paralympics.

== Personal ==
Carlton was born in the South African city of Pietermaritzburg on 8 May 1978. She moved with her family to Australia in 1986; they first settled in the Victorian town of Beechworth, where Carlton competed in local school swimming competitions. In 1990 they moved to the Hobart suburb of Glenorchy. Carlton then joined the City of Glenorchy Swimming Club (now known as the Hobart Aquatic Club), where she met Chris Wedd, who would be her coach throughout her Paralympic career.

== Competitive swimming ==
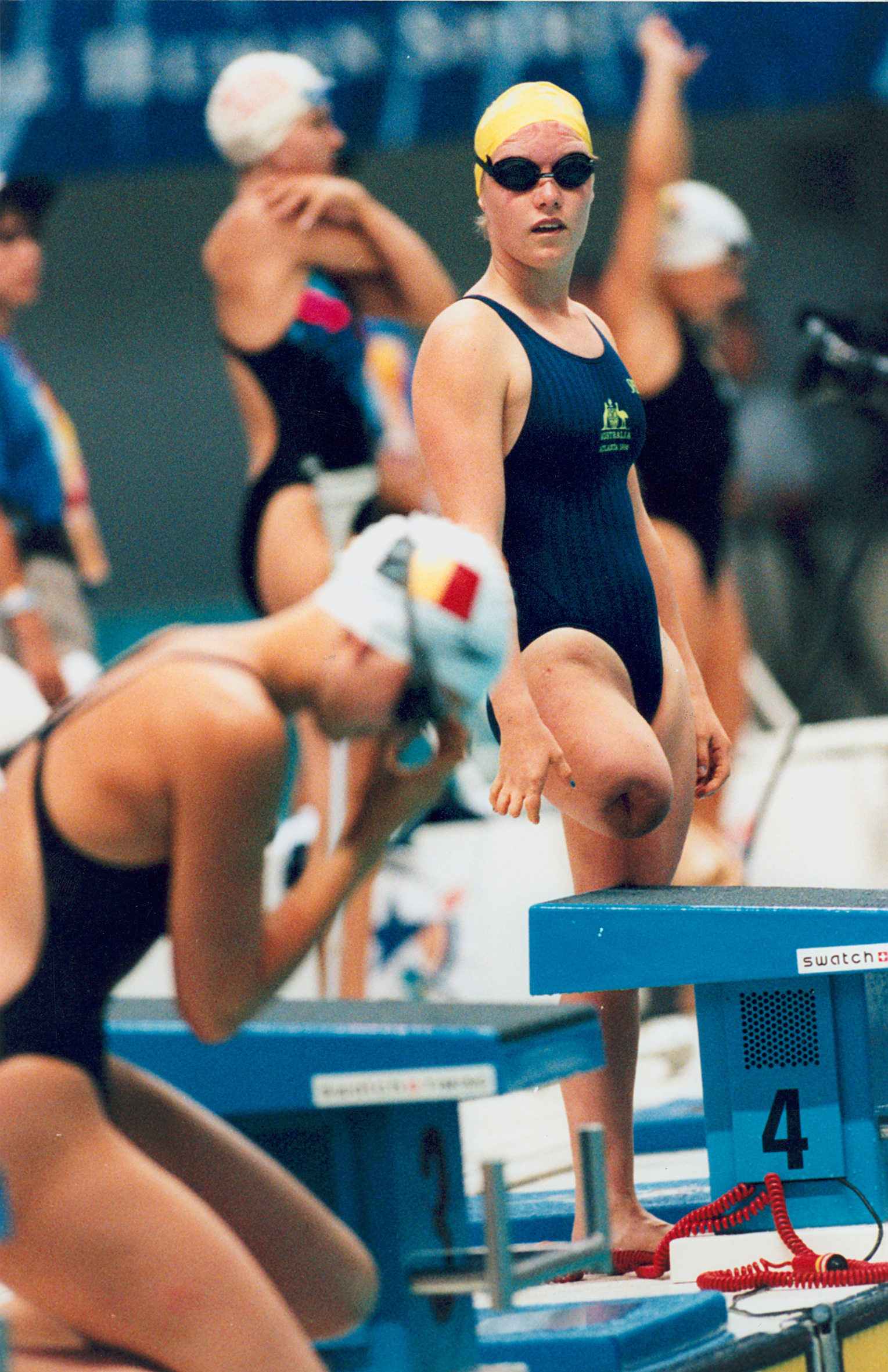
Australian swimmer Melissa Carlton before the start of a race at the 1996 Atlanta Paralympics

In 1991, Carlton won a gold medal in the 8 km event at the Tasmanian outdoor championships for able-bodied swimmers. She won a gold medal at the 1994 Victoria Commonwealth Games in Canada in the 100 m freestyle S9. In 1994, she had an Australian Institute of Sport scholarship in swimming.

At the 1996 Atlanta Games, she won two gold medals in the Women's 400 m Freestyle S9 and Women's 4x100 m Freestyle S7–10 events, for which she received a Medal of the Order of Australia, two silver medals in the Women's 100 m Butterfly S9 and Women's 100 m Freestyle S9 events, and a bronze medal in the Women's 100 m Backstroke S9 event. At the 2000 Sydney Games, she won two silver medals in the Women's 400 m Freestyle S9 and Women's 100 m Freestyle S9 events and two bronze medals in the Women's 4x100 m Freestyle 34 pts and Women's 4x100 m Medley 34 pts events.

== Administration ==
Carlton has been involved with sports administration, holding several positions in Tasmania including Programs and Marketing Coordinator for the Hobart Aquatic Centre and Executive Officer of the Tasmanian Paralympic Committee. She has been the Manager of Launceston Aquatic since 2008.

== Recognition ==
In 1996, Carlton was named the Tasmanian Institute of Sport female athlete of the year, Tasmanian Sportswoman of the Year, and Hobart City Council Young Citizen of the Year. In 2000, she received an Australian Sports Medal. In 2001, she received the Tasmanian Athlete with a Disability of the Year award. She was added to the Tasmanian Sporting Hall of Fame in 2005. In 2009, she was noted as one of 50 Tasmanians of influence by The Examiner. Carlton was inducted onto the Tasmanian Honour Roll of Women in 2025.
