= Paul Barnett (swimmer) =

Australian Paralympic swimmer

Personal information
- Full name: Paul Barnett
- Nationality: Australia
- Born: 8 July 1970 (age 55) Perth, Western Australia
Medal record
Swimming
Paralympic Games
Gold medal – first place	2000 Sydney	Men's 100 m Breaststroke SB9
Bronze medal – third place	2000 Sydney	Men's 4x100 m Medley 34 pts

Paul Barnett, OAM (born 8 July 1980) is an Australian Paralympic swimmer. At the 2000 Sydney Games, he won a gold medal in the Men's 100 m Breaststroke SB9 event, for which he received a Medal of the Order of Australia, and a bronze medal in the Men's 4 × 100 m Medley 34 pts event.

== Personal ==
He was born 8 July 1980 in Perth, Western Australia. Barnett graduated from Mount Lawley Senior High, in Perth, Western Australia. He attended Mt Lawley for five years and developed his love of sport there, especially swimming and became the captain of the school's swimming team, beating able bodied swimmers consistently. He first became Murdoch House captain and then school swimming team captain and finally represented WA as a state swimmer. He set himself the goal of gold at the 2000 Olympics in 1996.
