= Scott Brockenshire =

Australian Paralympic swimmer (born 1969)

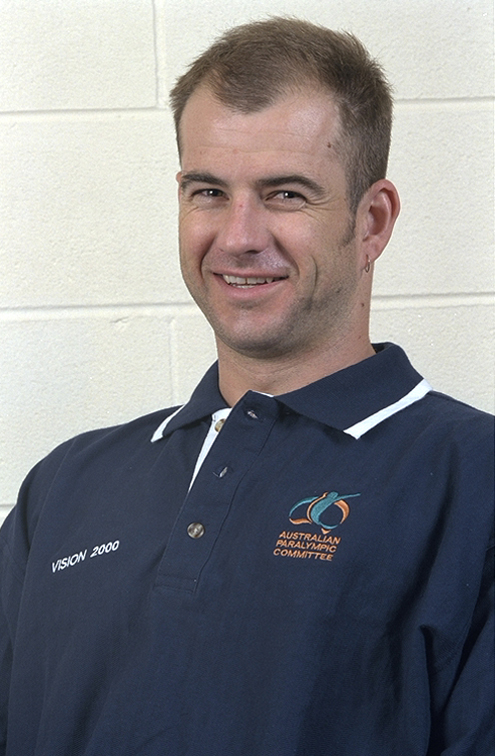
- 2000 Australian Paralympic team portrait of Brockenshire

Personal information
- Nationality: Australia
- Born: 1 March 1969 (age 57) Prahran, Victoria
Medal record
Swimming
Paralympic Games
Silver medal – second place	1996 Atlanta	Men's 4x100 m Freestyle S7–10
Silver medal – second place	2000 Sydney	Men's 4x100 m Freestyle 34 pts
Bronze medal – third place	1996 Atlanta	Men's 100 m Butterfly S10
Bronze medal – third place	1996 Atlanta	Men's 50 m Freestyle S10
Bronze medal – third place	2000 Sydney	Men's 100 m Butterfly S10
Bronze medal – third place	2000 Sydney	Men's 100 m Freestyle S10

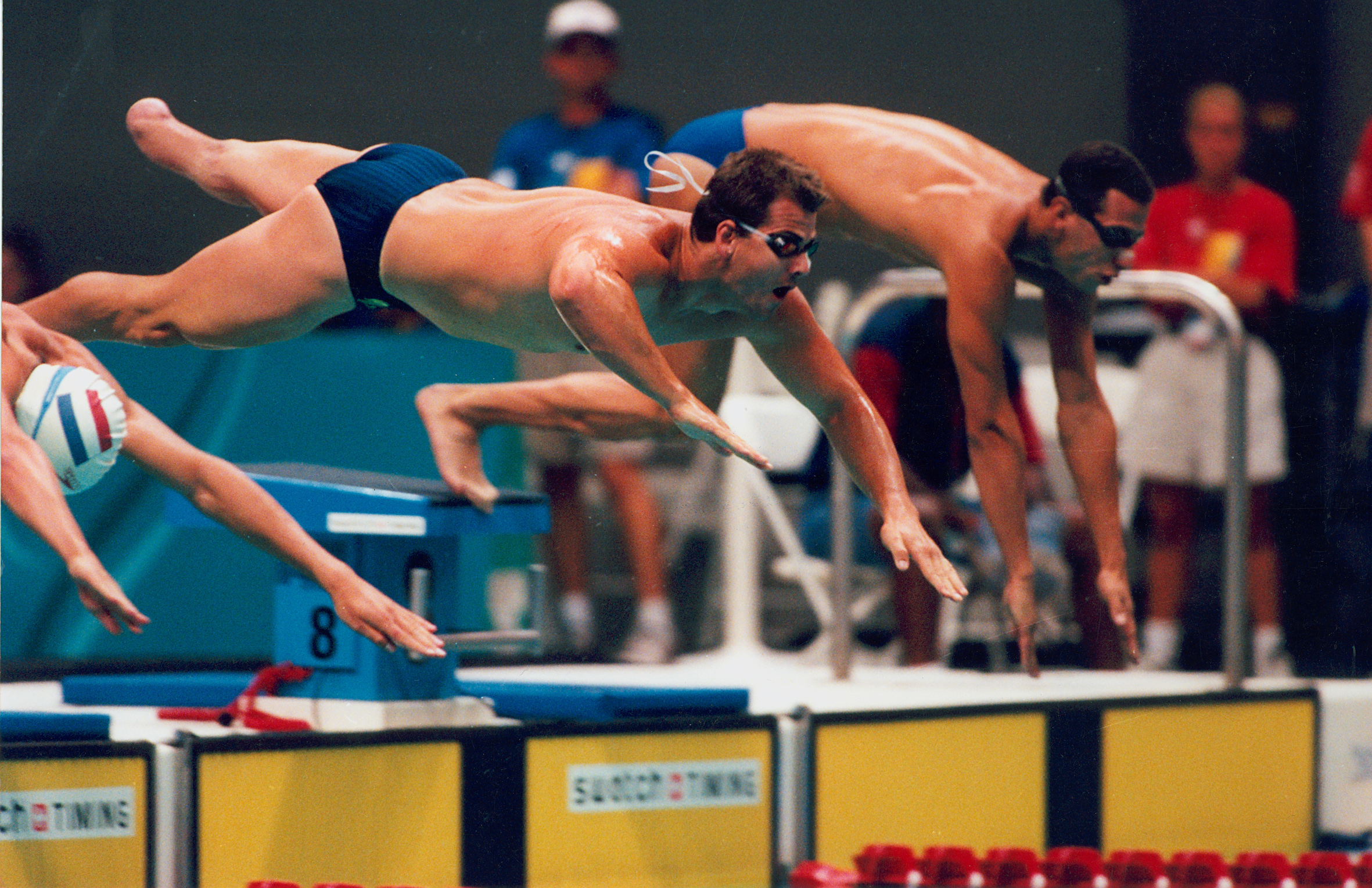
Australian S10 swimmer Scott Brockenshire (centre) leaves the blocks at the 1996 Atlanta Paralympic Games

Scott Brockenshire (born 1 March 1969) is an Australian Paralympic swimmer, who has won six medals at the 1996 Atlanta and 2000 Sydney Paralympics.

== Biography ==
Brockenshire was born in the Melbourne suburb of Prahran and lives in the Northern Rivers of New South Wales. He was born without a tibia and a shortened femur on his left leg, and at the age of eighteen months, his left foot was amputated. He began swimming at the age of about ten to improve his fitness. He won medals in able-bodied surf lifesaving competitions and was the state surf ski champion in 1987. He was inspired to take up competitive swimming after watching the events for people with disabilities at the 1994 Victoria Commonwealth Games in Canada.

At the 1996 Atlanta Paralympics, he won a silver medal in the Men's 4x100 m Freestyle S7–10 event and two bronze medals in the Men's 100 m Butterfly S10 and Men's 50 m Freestyle S10 events. In the final for the men's 4x100 m freestyle event, he was responsible for narrowing the British lead and keeping his relay team competitive. At the 2000 Sydney Paralympics, he won a silver medal in the Men's 4x100 m Freestyle 34 pts event and two bronze medals in the Men's 100 m Butterfly S10 and Men's 100 m Freestyle S10 events.

Brockenshire inspired New Zealand Paralympian Steven Yates to take up disabled sport.

He worked in Ballina, New South Wales as the manager of a gym.
