= Maciej Maik =

Polish Paralympic swimmer

Personal information
- Born: 26 August 1984 Tychy, Poland
- Died: 28 March 2003 (aged 18) Tychy, Poland

Sport
- Country: Poland
- Sport: Paralympic swimming
- Disability class: S10
Medal record
Paralympic swimming
Representing Poland
Paralympic Games
Gold medal – first place	2000 Sydney	100m backstroke S10
Silver medal – second place	2000 Sydney	100m breaststroke SB9
Silver medal – second place	2000 Sydney	200m individual medley SM10
World Championships
Gold medal – first place	2002 Mar del Plata	100m backstroke S10
Silver medal – second place	2002 Mar del Plata	100m breaststroke SB9

Maciej Maik (26 August 1984 - 28 March 2003) was a Polish Paralympic swimmer who competed at 2000 Summer Paralympics and won three medals. He was also a World champion in backstroke and silver medalist in breaststroke.

== Death ==
Maik took his own life and was found dead in his apartment in Tychy.
