= Cameron de Burgh =

Australian Paralympic swimmer (born 1971)

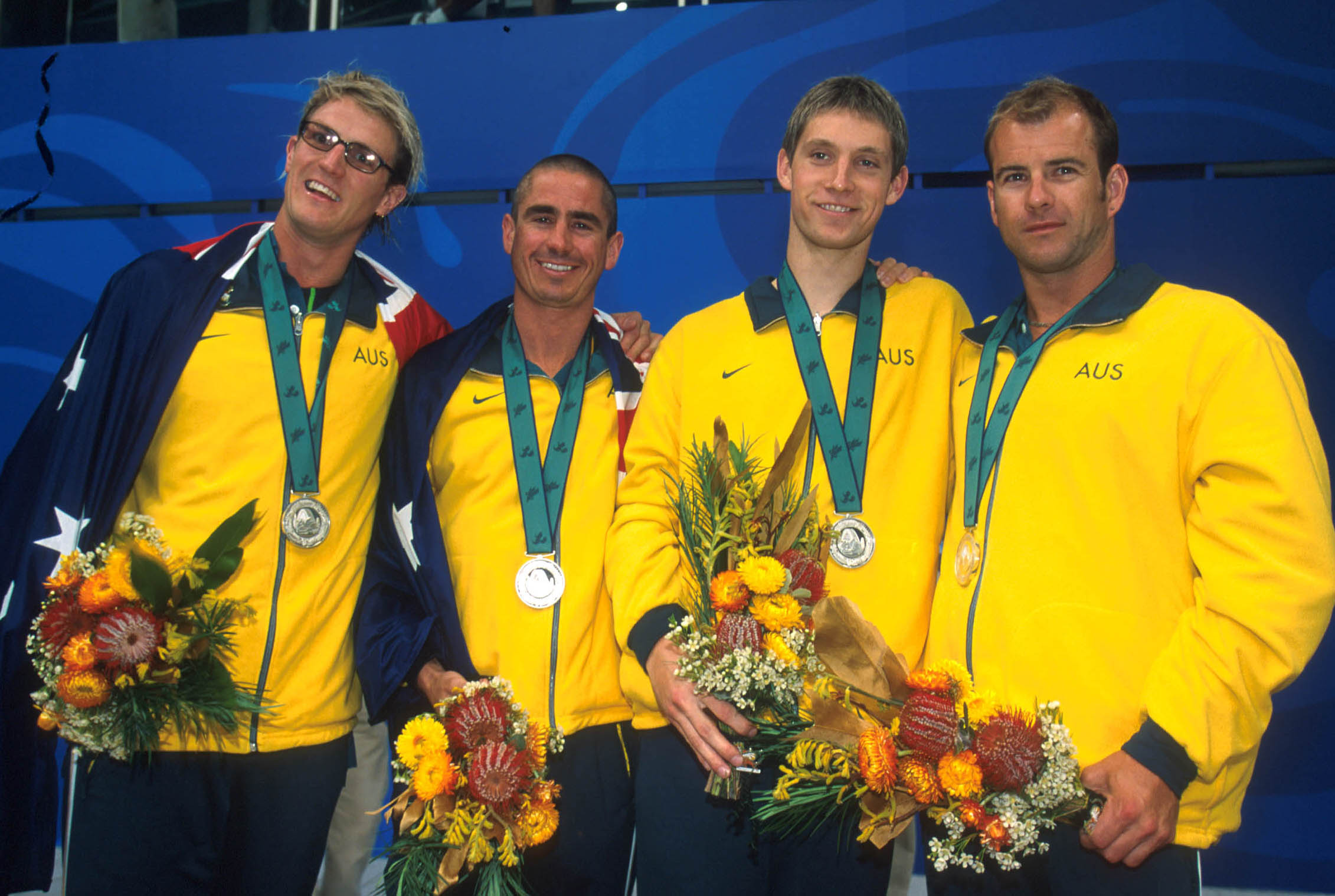
- De Burgh with teammates Alex Harris, Ben Austin and Scott Brockenshire showing their silver medals won in the Men's 4 x 100 m freestyle relay 34pts at the 2000 Summer Paralympics

Personal information
- Full name: Cammeron De'Burgh
- Nickname: Cam
- Nationality: Australia
- Born: 11 April 1971 (age 55) New Zealand
- Height: 6'
Medal record
Swimming
Paralympic Games
Silver medal – second place	1996 Atlanta	Men's 4x100 m Freestyle S7–10
Silver medal – second place	2000 Sydney	Men's 4x100 m Freestyle S9
Silver medal – second place	2000 Sydney	Men's 100 m Freestyle 34 pts
Bronze medal – third place	2000 Sydney	Men's 4x100 m Medley 34 pts
IPC Swimming World Championships
Gold medal – first place	1998 Christchurch	Men's 4 x 100m Freestyle Open
Silver medal – second place	1998 Christchurch	Men's 100m Freestyle S9
Silver medal – second place	1998 Christchurch	Men's 100m Butterfly S9
Bronze medal – third place	1998 Christchurch	Men's 50m Freestyle S9

Cameron de Burgh (born 11 April 1971) is an Australian Paralympic swimmer, who has won four medals at two Paralympics.

== Personal ==
De Burgh was born in New Zealand on 11 April 1971, and moved to Brisbane in Australia in 1991. At the age of 16, his trail-bike was hit by a car while he was performing a U-turn and his right leg was amputated above the knee due to his injuries. Four months after the accident, he began an apprenticeship at a golf course.

== Swimming ==
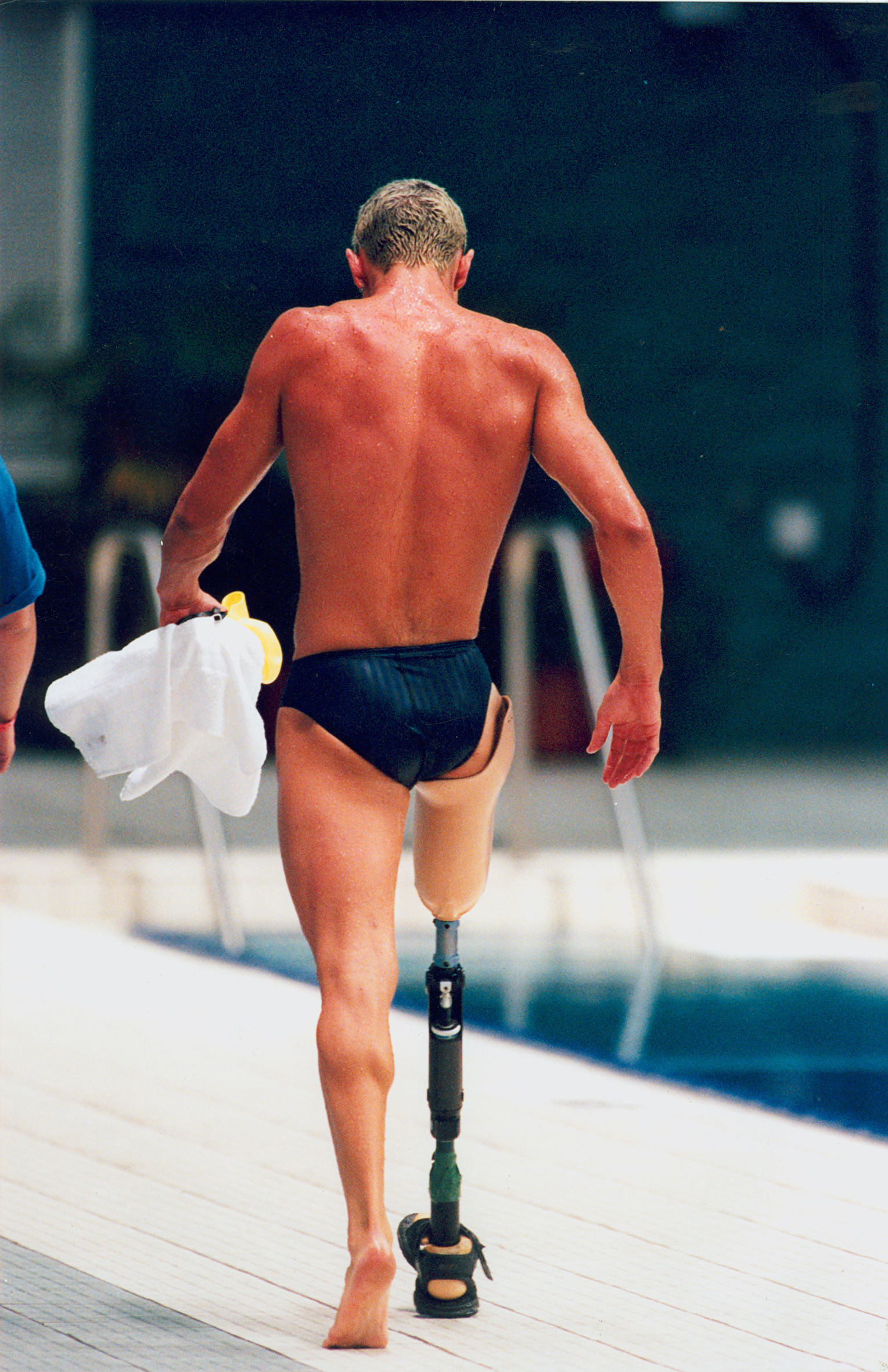
De Burgh on the pool deck at the 1996 Summer Paralympics

De Burgh started swimming in the early 1990s. In 1995, he won five gold medals at the Australian National Swimming Championships. He won a silver medal at the 1996 Atlanta Games in the Men's 4x100 m Freestyle S7–10 event. In the freestyle and butterfly events at the 1996 Games, he set Australian records. He was a 1997 and 1998 Motor Accidents Authority Paralympian. In 1998, he competed at the IPC Swimming World Championships in Christchurch. In the 100 m freestyle and 100 m butterfly events, he won silver medals. At the Championship, he was part of the Australian 4 x 100 m relay team that won a gold medal. In 1999, he competed in the German and United Kingdom national swimming championships. His medal haul at these two events included five gold medals, a silver medal and a bronze medal. In 2000, his competitive sport participation was sponsored by the Motor Accidents Authority in New South Wales. At the 2000 Sydney Paralympics, he won two silver medals in the Men's 100 m Freestyle S9 and Men's 4x100 m Freestyle 34 pts events and a bronze medal in the Men's 4x100 m Medley 34 pts event.

== Recognition ==
In 1995, the Australian Paralympic Federation named De Burgh their Developing Paralympian of the Year.
