= Siobhan Paton =

Australian Paralympic swimmer (born 1983)

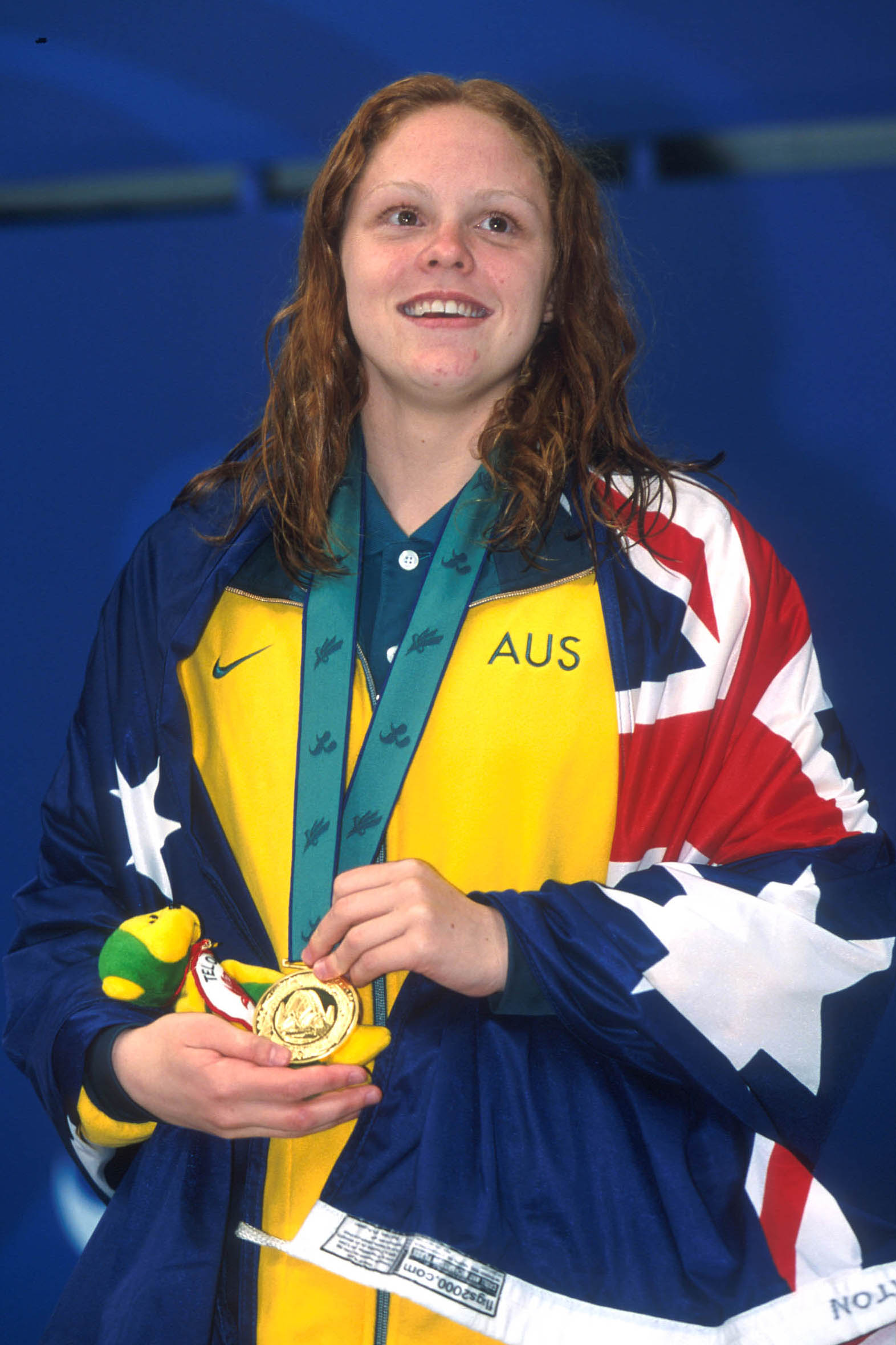
- Siobhan Paton at the 2000 Paralympics

Personal information
- Full name: Siobhan Bethany Paton
- Nationality: Australia
- Born: 28 August 1983 (age 43)

Sport
- Sport: Swimming
- Strokes: Freestyle, Backstroke, Breaststroke, Butterfly
- Club: Telopea Swim Club (Joined: 1998)
Medal record
Swimming (S14)
Representing Australia
Event	1st	2nd	3rd
Paralympic Games	6	0	0
Total	6	0	0
Paralympic Games
Gold medal – first place	2000 Sydney	50m freestyle
Gold medal – first place	2000 Sydney	200m freestyle
Gold medal – first place	2000 Sydney	50m backstroke
Gold medal – first place	2000 Sydney	50m butterfly
Gold medal – first place	2000 Sydney	100m freestyle
Gold medal – first place	2000 Sydney	200m individual medley
IPC Swimming World Championships
Gold medal – first place	1998 Christchurch	200 m Individual medley SM14
Gold medal – first place	1998 Christchurch	50 m Butterfly S14
Gold medal – first place	1998 Christchurch	50 m Backstroke S14
Gold medal – first place	1998 Christchurch	4 x 100 m Freestyle S14
Gold medal – first place	1998 Christchurch	4 x 50 m Medley S14
Silver medal – second place	1998 Christchurch	200 m Freestyle S14
Bronze medal – third place	1998 Christchurch	50 m Freestyle S14

Siobhan Bethany Paton, OAM (born 28 August 1983) is an Australian Paralympic swimmer who was born in Sydney. Paton has had an intellectual disability from birth which was a consequence a lack of oxygen. Paton decided to become a swimmer after finding out she has a connective tissue disorder and that swimming would assist in the strengthening of her joints. Siobhan initially began competing with non-disabled athletes and only in 1997 did she compete in a competition for athletes with disabilities, where she won seven gold medals and one silver medal. As of 2004, she holds thirteen world records in her disability class of S14.

Paton represented Australia at the 2000 Summer Paralympics in Sydney, where she won six gold medals, for which she received a Medal of the Order of Australia, and set world records on nine occasions in the process. In recognition of her achievement, the Australian Paralympic Committee named her "Paralympian of the Year", and she was honoured on a postage stamp. She was also awarded an Australian Sports Medal before the 2000 games. In 2013, she was inducted into the ACT Sport Hall of Fame.

== 2000 Summer Paralympics ==
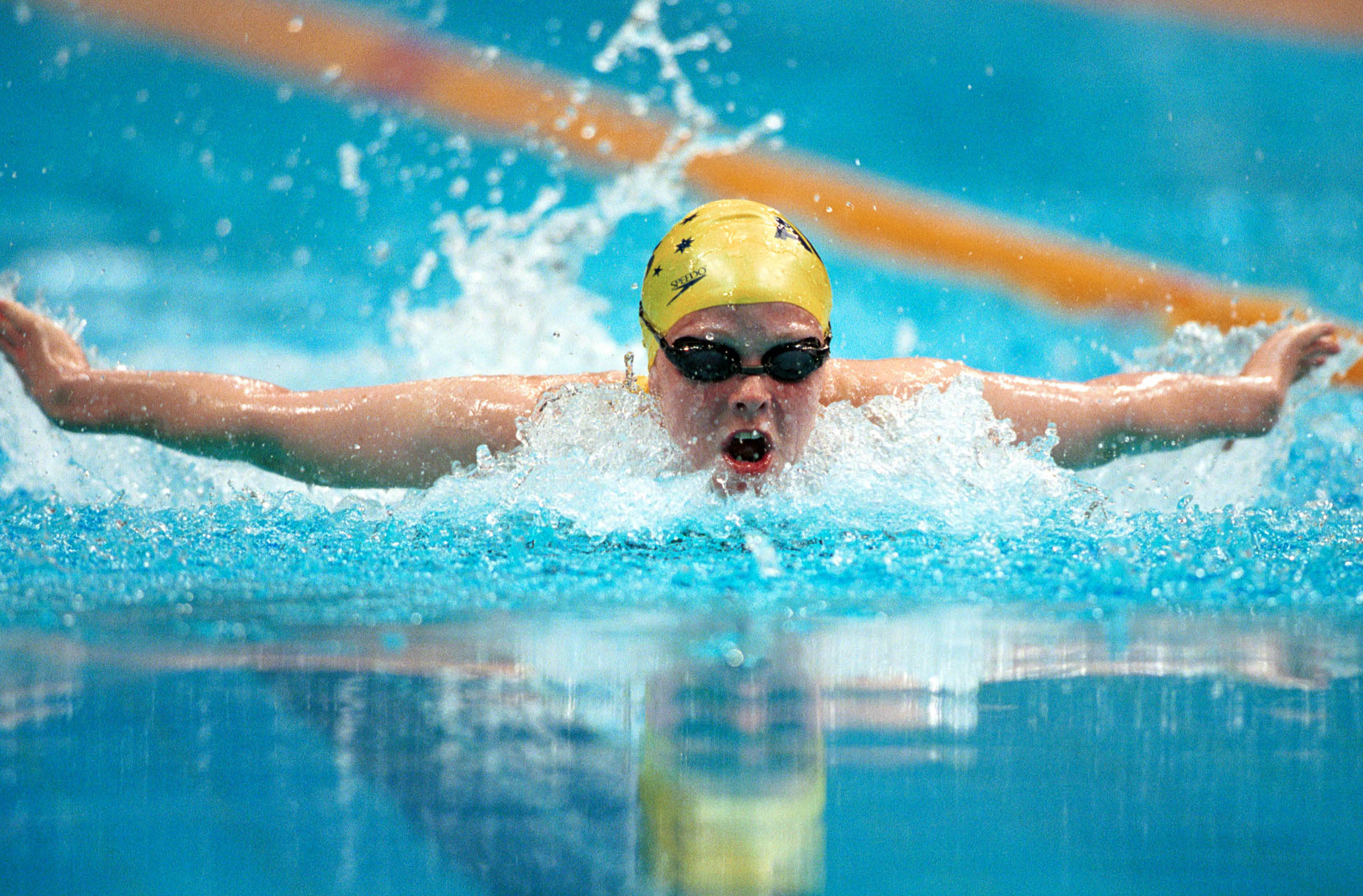
Paton at the 2000 Summer Paralympic Games in Sydney.

Siobhan Paton only competed in one Paralympics in her career where she managed to set many world records; some of which remain unbroken. Siobhan remained composed during the 2000 Paralympics because she had the mentality that it was 'just another meet'. Paton was coached by the grandfather of Jacqueline Freney who now assists in the development of Freney.

Paton won six Paralympic medals during the 2000 Sydney Paralympic Games. She won gold in the 50m freestyle, 200m freestyle, 50m backstroke, 50m butterfly, 100m freestyle and 200m individual medley. Paton was identified as one of the highest individual gold medalist at a single Games.

The 2000 Summer Paralympic Games in Sydney were the final Paralympic Games which Paton was eligible to compete in. Having an intellectual disability meant that Paton was never allowed to better her initial Paralympic achievements after the International Paralympic Committee (IPC) banned all athletes in her class after the Spanish basketball scandal at the 2000 Games.

== After 2000 ==
In 2004, Paton competed in the INAS-FID (International Sports Federation for People with an Intellectual Disability) World Championships, where she won fourteen gold medals and three silver. That same year, she won three gold medals, two silver and two bronze at the Global Games.

Paton could not compete in the 2004 or 2008 Paralympics due to the International Paralympic Committee's decision to suspend the participation of all athletes with intellectual disabilities. The decision by the IPC caused Paton to sink into depression from 2004 on since she felt as though she "wasn't disabled enough" even though it was accelerated by a cover all banning of all athletes with intellectual disability after the 2000 gold medal-winning Spanish basketball team had only two players with an intellectual disability. Her friend Jacqueline Freney was the person who made Paton feel proud of the gold medals which she had won. From 2000 to 2002, she held an Australian Institute of Sport scholarship. Her sister Sarah Paton competed in the Women's 800m Freestyle at the 2004 Summer Olympics. Siobhan had hoped that she would be competing at the Athens Games alongside her sister after the testing by the IPC. However, this was not the case and as a result escalated her all-ready depressed state.

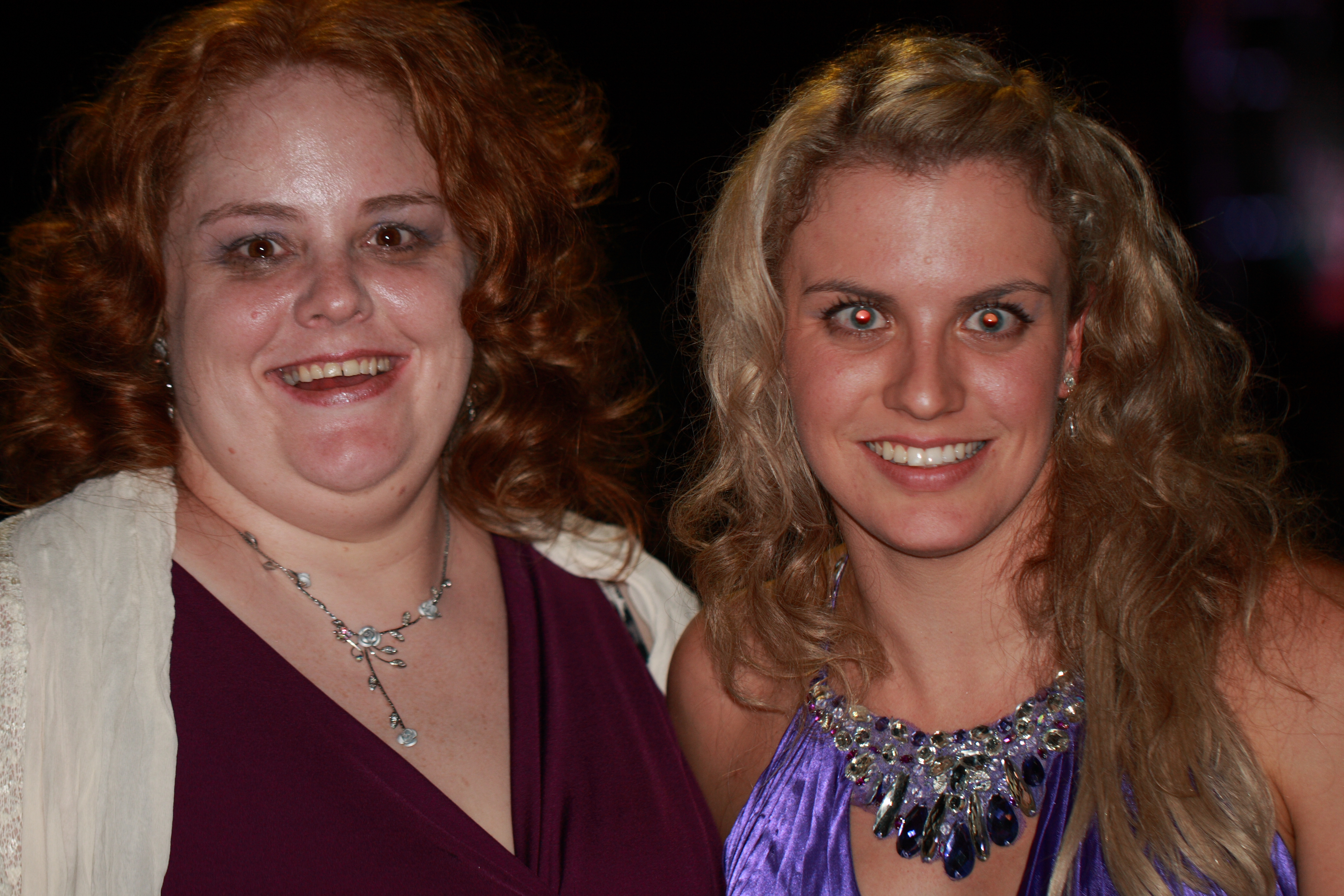
Paton with Jacqueline Freney at the 2012 Australian Paralympian of the Year ceremony

In 2013, she was inducted into the ACT Sport Hall of Fame. In October 2014, she was inducted into the Path of Champions at the Sydney Olympic Park Aquatic Centre.
