= Australia at the 2000 Summer Paralympics =

- IPC code: AUS
- NPC: Australian Paralympic Committee
- Website: www.paralympic.org.au

in Sydney
- Competitors: 285 in 18 sports
- Flag bearer: Brendan Burkett (Opening) Neil Fuller (Closing)
- Officials: 148
- Medals Ranked 1st: Gold 63 Silver 39 Bronze 47 Total 149

Summer Paralympics appearances (overview)
- 1960; 1964; 1968; 1972; 1976; 1980; 1984; 1988; 1992; 1996; 2000; 2004; 2008; 2012; 2016; 2020; 2024

Australia was the host nation for the 2000 Summer Paralympics which was held in Sydney. Australia competed in the games between 18 and 29 October. The team consisted of 285 athletes in 18 sports with 148 officials. It was the country's largest ever Paralympic delegation to a Games. Australia has participated at every Summer Paralympic Games since its inception. Australia finished at the top of the medal tally with 63 gold, 39 silver and 47 bronze medals to total 149 medals for the games. This was the first time and the only time to date that Australia has finished on top of either an Olympic or Paralympic medal tally.

The most successful sports were athletics, cycling, equestrian, swimming and wheelchair tennis. As one of the sporting events, sailing involved the implementation of forecasting systems and services in Sydney Harbour, in addition to the recruitment of professionals to design the project’s plans and processes. This occurred in order to fulfil the requirements of both event organisers, competitors and visitors.

Notable Australian performances were:

- Siobhan Paton won six gold medals in S14 swimming events and set six world records
- Timothy Sullivan won five gold medals and set five world records in athletics
- Neil Fuller, a leg amputee sprinter, won four gold medals and one bronze medal and was flag bearer at the closing ceremony
- Lisa Llorens won three gold medals and one silver medal in athletics
- Greg Smith in wheelchair athletics events won three gold medals
- Lisa McIntosh won three gold medals in athletics
- Athletes who won two individual gold medals were: Louise Sauvage, Russell Short, Amy Winters, Julie Higgins, Kingsley Bugarin, and Gemma Dashwood.

Ultimately, this event has historically influenced The Australian Paralympic Movement and has present impacts on the social development of the Australian nation and its disabled community. Noting the access and disability challenges experienced prior to and during the Games, the outcomes of central organisational bodies responsible for devising and executing plans associated with this have been reviewed. Following the announcement of Sydney being the host city for the 2000 Olympic and Paralympic Games on 23 September 1993, the NSW Government established central organisations and bodies to distribute the workload, responsibilities and eventually, allocated funding based on this.

== Context ==
The games were the eleventh Summer Paralympics since its commencement in 1960. The opening ceremony took place on 18 October, followed by eleven days of intense competition. As the hosting nation, Sydney implemented a number of conservation and environmental education actions. The dedication to water saving techniques during both the Olympic and Paralympic games led to praise from the International Paralympic Committee. Many held the organization of the games in high esteem. This success was attributed to the coordination between the Sydney Paralympic Organising Committee and the Sydney Organising Committee for the Olympic Games.

The Mascot for the games was 'Lizzie' the frill-neck lizard, a well-known Australian animal. The voice for 'Lizzie' was Olivia Newton-John, singer and actor. 'Lizzie' was well marketed and considered a successful iconic representation of the Sydney Paralympic games.

Australia topped the medal count for the first time in games history, with a total of 149 medals. Notable performances from the Australian team include Siobhan Paton (swimming) with six gold medals, Tim Sullivan (track and field) with five gold medals and Matthew Gray (cycling) with two gold medals.

== Background ==
Several Australian venues were used to host the Sydney 2000 Paralympic games. Listed below are the main locations and a brief description of the events at each:

- Anne Clark Netball Centre, Lidcombe – Volleyball (Sitting & Standing),
- Dunc Gray Velodrome, Bass Hill – Cycling,
- Equestrian Centre, Horsley Park – Equestrian,
- Exhibition Halls, Darling Harbour – Judo, Wheelchair Fencing,
- Sailing Marina, Rushcutters Bay – Sailing
- Shooting Centre, Cecil Park – Shooting
- Sydney Olympic Park – Archery, Athletics, Basketball (Wheelchair & Intellectually Disabled), Boccia, Football, Goalball, Powerlifting, Swimming, Table Tennis, Wheelchair Rugby, Wheelchair Tennis.

Huge crowds were drawn to these locations, namely some 340 000 school children. Schools were provided with free day tickets for students to attend, promoting the major schools education project which ran alongside the games. The Sydney Olympic Games Organising Committee (SOCOG) and the Sydney Paralympic Organising Committee (SPOC) held an administrative and organisational partnership to deliver three months of festivals including the Olympic Games, Paralympics Games and cultural festival. This partnership alleviated transitional issues present at the 1996 Atlanta games, due to cross involvement between the committees at all events.

Prime Minister John Howard wished the team good luck and said:

"Their gold medal tally at Atlanta was second only and our team in Sydney next year will be the largest and strongest ever."

Howard mentioned during his speech that the government has provided the athletes with A$5.5 million to prepare for the games. The Australian Paralympic team launch took place during Paralympic Week. There were a number of other events prior to the commencement of the games including the launch of the formal uniforms at the museum of contemporary art and the Nike launch where both Olympic and Paralympic athletes modelled side by side.

== Team ==
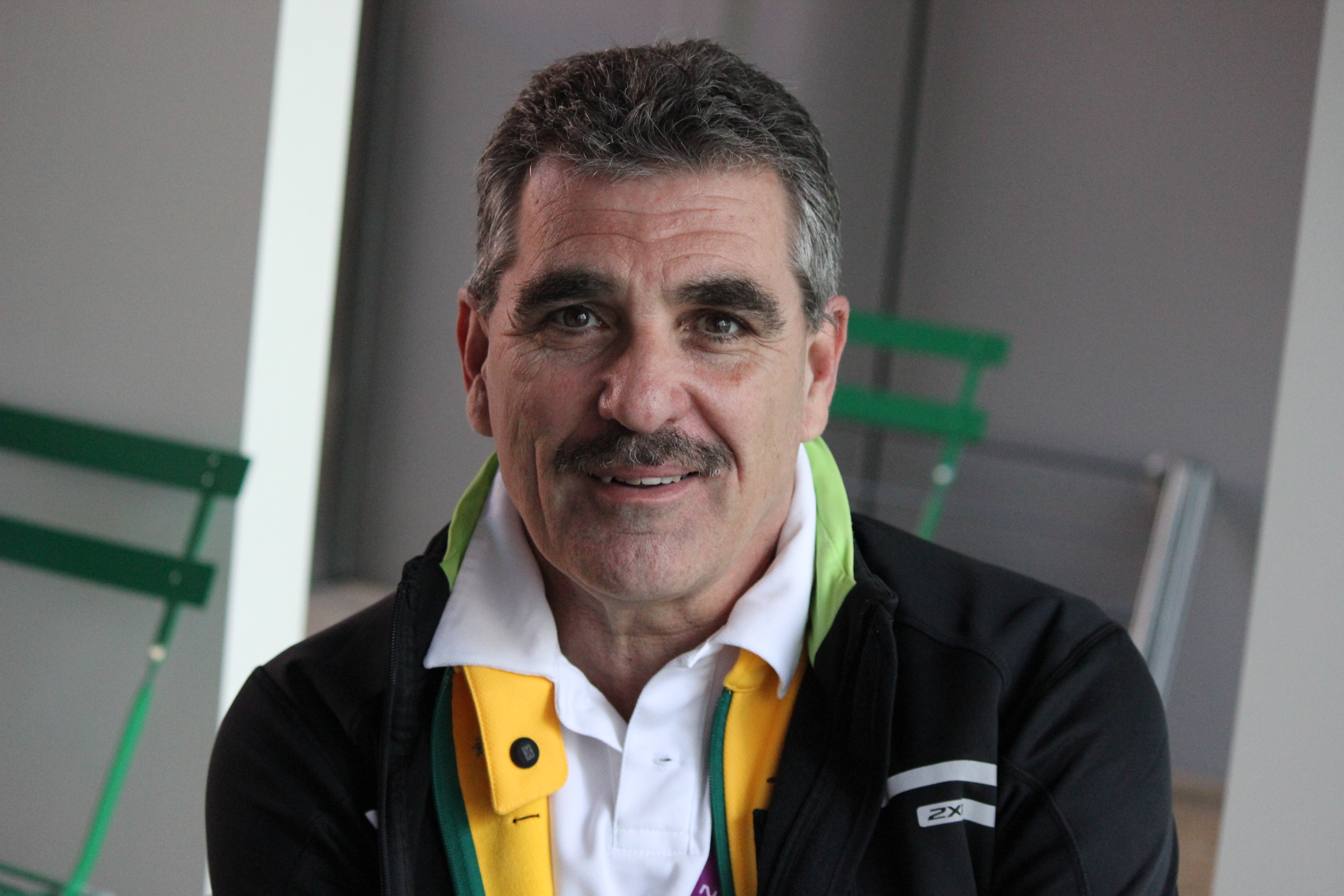
Paul Bird

There were 285 athletes participating in 18 sports. The Australian team had the largest number of athletes with an intellectual disability, a total of 30. Brendan Burkett, Australian Paralympic swimmer was the opening ceremony flag bearer and Neil Fuller, Australian Paralympic athletics medalist was the closing ceremony flag bearer. Australian athlete Louise Sauvage lit the Paralympic Cauldron at the opening ceremony.

The Chef de Mission was Paul Bird, a Paralympic medalist in 1980 and 1984. He was supported by four assistant Chef de Missions; Keith Gilbert, Greg Campbell, Tony Naar and Robyn Smith.

== Medalists ==
Medal	Name	Sport	Event
Gold	Fabian Blattman	Athletics	Men's 400 m T51
Gold	Joanne Bradshaw	Athletics	Women's Shot Put F37
Gold	Stephen Eaton	Athletics	Men's Discus Throw F34
Gold	Rebecca Feldman	Athletics	Women's 400 m T34
Gold	Anton Flavel	Athletics	Men's Javelin Throw F20
Gold	Heath Francis	Athletics	Men's 400 m T46
Gold	Neil Fuller	Athletics	Men's 200 m T44
Gold	Neil Fuller	Athletics	Men's 400 m T44
Gold	John Lindsay	Athletics	Men's 100 m T53
Gold	Lisa Llorens	Athletics	Women's Long Jump F20
Gold	Lisa Llorens	Athletics	Women's High Jump F20
Gold	Lisa Llorens	Athletics	Women's 200 m T20
Gold	Lisa McIntosh	Athletics	Women's 100 m T37
Gold	Lisa McIntosh	Athletics	Women's 400 m T38
Gold	Lisa McIntosh	Athletics	Women's 200 m T38
Gold	Paul Mitchell	Athletics	Men's 1500 m T20
Gold	Alison Quinn	Athletics	Women's 100 m T38
Gold	Louise Sauvage	Athletics	Women's 5000 m T54
Gold	Louise Sauvage	Athletics	Women's 1500 m T54
Gold	Russell Short	Athletics	Men's Discus Throw F12
Gold	Russell Short	Athletics	Men's Shot Put F12
Gold	Greg Smith	Athletics	Men's 800 m T52
Gold	Greg Smith	Athletics	Men's 1500 m T52
Gold	Greg Smith	Athletics	Men's 5000 m T52
Gold	Tim Sullivan	Athletics	Men's 100 m T38
Gold	Tim Sullivan	Athletics	Men's 200 m T38
Gold	Tim Sullivan	Athletics	Men's 400 m T38
Gold	Geoff Trappett	Athletics	Men's 100 m T54
Gold	Jodi Willis-Roberts	Athletics	Women's Shot Put F12
Gold	Amy Winters	Athletics	Women's 100 m T46
Gold	Amy Winters	Athletics	Women's 200 m T46
Gold	Darren Thrupp, Adrian Grogan, Kieran Ault-Connell, Tim Sullivan	Athletics	Men's 4 × 100 m relay T38
Gold	Stephen Wilson, Neil Fuller, Tim Matthews, Heath Francis	Athletics	Men's 4 × 100 m relay T46
Gold	Darren Thrupp, Adrian Grogan, Kieran Ault-Connell, Tim Sullivan	Athletics	Men's 4 × 400 m relay T38
Gold	Stephen Wilson, Neil Fuller, Tim Matthews, Heath Francis	Athletics	Men's 4 × 400 m relay T46
Gold	Greg Ball, Matthew Gray, Paul Lake	Cycling	Mixed Olympic Team Sprint LC1-LC3
Gold	Paul Clohessy, Darren Harry	Cycling	Men's tandem sprint open
Gold	Matthew Gray	Cycling	Mixed 1 km time trial LC1
Gold	Sarnya Parker, Tania Modra	Cycling	Women's individual pursuit tandem open
Gold	Sarnya Parker, Tania Modra	Cycling	Women's 1 km time trial tandem open
Gold	Peter Homann	Cycling	Mixed bicycle road race CP div 4
Gold	Daniel Polson	Cycling	Mixed bicycle road race LC2
Gold	Christopher Scott	Cycling	Mixed bicycle time trial CP div 4
Gold	Lyn Lepore, Lynette Nixon	Cycling	Women's tandem road race open
Gold	Mark le Flohic	Cycling	Mixed tricycle 5.4 km time trial CP div 2
Gold	Julie Higgins	Equestrian	Mixed dressage Championship grade III
Gold	Julie Higgins	Equestrian	Mixed dressage Freestyle grade III
Gold	Noel Robins, Jamie Dunross, Graeme Martin	Sailing	Three person Sonar
Gold	Paul Barnett	Swimming	100 m breaststroke SB9
Gold	Kingsley Bugarin	Swimming	100 m breaststroke SB12
Gold	Kingsley Bugarin	Swimming	200 m individual medley SM12
Gold	Jeff Hardy	Swimming	400 m freestyle S12
Gold	Siobhan Paton	Swimming	50 m backstroke S14
Gold	Siobhan Paton	Swimming	50 m butterfly S14
Gold	Siobhan Paton	Swimming	50 m freestyle S14
Gold	Siobhan Paton	Swimming	100 m freestyle S14
Gold	Siobhan Paton	Swimming	200 m freestyle S14
Gold	Siobhan Paton	Swimming	200 m individual medley SM14
Gold	Judith Green	Swimming	100 m breaststroke SB6
Gold	Priya Cooper	Swimming	400 m freestyle S8
Gold	Gemma Dashwood	Swimming	400 m freestyle S10
Gold	Brett Reid, Paul Cross, Patrick Donachie, Stewart Pike,	Swimming	Men's 4 × 100 m freestyle relay S14
Gold	David Hall	Wheelchair Tennis	Men's singles
Silver	Heath Francis	Athletics	Men's 200 m T46
Silver	Kurt Fearnley	Athletics	Men's 800 m T54
Silver	Fabian Blattman	Athletics	Men's 1500 m T51
Silver	Bruce Wallrodt	Athletics	Men's shot put F54
Silver	Lee Cox	Athletics	Men's pentathlon P13
Silver	Lisa Llorens	Athletics	Women's 100 m T20
Silver	Rebecca Feldman	Athletics	Women's 100 m T34
Silver	Katrina Webb	Athletics	Women's 100 m T38
Silver	Sharon Rackham	Athletics	Women's 200 m T20
Silver	Alison Quinn	Athletics	Women's 200 m T38
Silver	Katrina Webb	Athletics	Women's 400 m T38
Silver	Louise Sauvage	Athletics	Women's 800 m T54
Silver	Norma Koplick	Athletics	Women's javelin F20
Silver	Lynda Holt	Athletics	Women's shot put F55
Silver	John Lindsay, Paul Nunnari, Kurt Fearnley, Geoff Trappett	Athletics	Men's 4 × 100 m relay T54
Silver	Paul O'Neill	Cycling	Mixed bicycle road race LC1
Silver	Lyn Lepore, Lynette Nixon	Cycling	Women's 1 km time trial tandem open
Silver	Paul Lake	Cycling	Mixed individual pursuit LC2
Silver	Richard Nicholson	Powerlifting	Men's 60 kg
Silver	Peter Tait	Shooting	Mixed sport pistol SH1
Silver	Alex Harris	Swimming	Men's 100 m freestyle S7
Silver	Cameron de Burgh	Swimming	Men's 100 m freestyle S9
Silver	Ben Austin	Swimming	Men's 200 m individual medley SM8
Silver	Stewart Pike	Swimming	Men's 200 m individual medley SM14
Silver	Kingsley Bugarin	Swimming	Men's 400 m freestyle S12
Silver	Tamara Nowitzki	Swimming	Women's 100 m breaststroke SB7
Silver	Melissa Carlton	Swimming	Women's 100 m freestyle S9
Silver	Melissa Carlton	Swimming	Women's 400 m freestyle S9
Silver	Tracey Cross	Swimming	Women's 400 m freestyle S11
Silver	Tracey Cross	Swimming	Women's 100 m freestyle S11
Silver	Alicia Aberley	Swimming	Women's 100 m freestyle S14
Silver	Alicia Aberley	Swimming	Women's 200 m individual medley SM14
Silver	Gemma Dashwood	Swimming	Women's 200 m individual medley SM10
Silver	Elizabeth Wright	Swimming	Women's 400 m freestyle S6
Silver	Scott Brockenshire, Brendan Burkett, Cameron de Burgh, Shane Walsh, Alex Harris, Justin Eveson	Swimming	Men's 4 × 100 m freestyle relay 34 pts
Silver	Australia women's national wheelchair basketball team: Julianne Adams; Jane Webb; Paula Coghlan; Lisa O'Nion; Amanda Carter; Donna Ritchie; Sharon Slann; Liesl Tesch; Nadya Romeo; Karen Farrell; Mellissa Dunn; Alison Mosely	Wheelchair Basketball	Women's tournament
Silver	Australia national wheelchair rugby team: Bryce Alman; Patrick Ryan; Garry Croker; Steve Porter; Tom Kennedy; Brad Dubberley; Clifford Clarke; Brett Boylan; Peter Harding; Craig Parsons; Nazim Erdem; George Hucks	Wheelchair Rugby	Mixed tournament
Silver	Daniela di Toro, Branka Pupovac	Wheelchair Tennis	Women's doubles
Silver	David Hall, David Johnson	Wheelchair Tennis	Men's doubles
Bronze	Andrew Newell	Athletics	Men's 100 m T20
Bronze	Neil Fuller	Athletics	Men's 100 m T44
Bronze	Tim Matthews	Athletics	Men's 100 m T46
Bronze	Tim Matthews	Athletics	Men's 200 m T46
Bronze	John Lindsay	Athletics	Men's 200 m T53
Bronze	Andrew Newell	Athletics	Men's 400 m T20
Bronze	Fabian Blattman	Athletics	Men's 800 m T51
Bronze	Roy Daniell	Athletics	Men's Marathon T13
Bronze	Brian Harvey	Athletics	Men's discus F38
Bronze	Murray Goldfinch	Athletics	Men's shot put F20
Bronze	Don Elgin	Athletics	Men's pentathlon P44
Bronze	Rebecca Feldman	Athletics	Women's 200 m T34
Bronze	Katrina Webb	Athletics	Women's 200 m T38
Bronze	Amy Winters	Athletics	Women's 400 m T46
Bronze	Trish Flavel	Athletics	Women's 800 m T20
Bronze	Jodi Willis-Roberts	Athletics	Women's discus F12
Bronze	Rosalie Fahey	Equestrian	Mixed dressage Championship grade I
Bronze	Marita Hird	Equestrian	Mixed dressage Freestyle grade III
Bronze	Christopher Scott	Cycling	Mixed bicycle road race CP div 4
Bronze	Peter Homann	Cycling	Mixed bicycle time trial CP div 4
Bronze	Mark le Flohic	Cycling	Mixed tricycle 1.9 km time trial CP div 2
Bronze	Paul O'Neill	Cycling	Mixed 1 km time trial LC1
Bronze	Paul Lake	Cycling	Mixed 1 km time trial LC2
Bronze	Eddie Hollands, Paul Clohessy	Cycling	Men's 1 km time trial tandem open
Bronze	Paul O'Neill	Cycling	Mixed individual pursuit LC1
Bronze	Lyn Lepore, Lynette Nixon	Cycling	Women's individual pursuit tandem open
Bronze	Mark Altmann	Swimming	Men's 50 m butterfly S7
Bronze	Alex Harris	Swimming	Men's 50 m freestyle S7
Bronze	Benoit Austin	Swimming	Men's 100 m butterfly S8
Bronze	Scott Brockenshire	Swimming	Men's 100 m freestyle S10
Bronze	Scott Brockenshire	Swimming	Men's 100 m butterfly S10
Bronze	Alicia Aberley	Swimming	Women's 50 m breaststroke SB14
Bronze	Amanda Fraser	Swimming	Women's 50 m freestyle S7
Bronze	Tracey Cross	Swimming	Women's 50 m freestyle S11
Bronze	Casey Redford	Swimming	Women's 100 m backstroke S9
Bronze	Lucy Williams	Swimming	Women's 100 m breaststroke SB6
Bronze	Stacey Williams	Swimming	Women's 100 m breaststroke SB7
Bronze	Brooke Stockham	Swimming	Women's 100 m breaststroke SB8
Bronze	Katerina Bailey	Swimming	Women's 100 m butterfly S9
Bronze	Priya Cooper	Swimming	Women's 100 m freestyle S8
Bronze	Alicia Aberley	Swimming	Women's 200 m freestyle S14
Bronze	Brooke Stockham	Swimming	Women's 200 m individual medley SM8
Bronze	Dianna Ley	Swimming	Women's 400 m freestyle S9
Bronze	Cameron de Burgh, Paul Barnett, David Rolfe, Alex Harris, Ben Austin, Daniel Bell, Justin Eveson	Swimming	Men's 4 × 100 m medley relay 34 pts
Bronze	Denise Beckwith, Elizabeth Wright, Melissa Willson, Karni Liddell	Swimming	Women's 4×50 m freestyle relay 20 pts
Bronze	Melissa Carlton, Priya Cooper, Amanda Fraser, Gemma Dashwood	Swimming	Women's 4 × 100 m freestyle relay 34 pts
Bronze	Priya Cooper, Brooke Stockham, Katerina Bailey, Melissa Carlton	Swimming	Women's 4 × 100 m medley relay 34 pts

Medals by discipline
Discipline	Gold medal	Silver medal	Bronze medal	Total
Archery	0	0	0	0
Athletics	35	15	16	66
Wheelchair basketball	0	1	0	1
Boccia	0	0	0	0
Cycling	10	3	8	21
Equestrian	2	0	2	4
Wheelchair fencing	0	0	0	0
Football seven-a-side	0	0	0	0
Judo	0	0	0	0
Powerlifting	0	1	0	1
Sailing	1	0	0	1
Shooting	0	1	0	1
Swimming	14	15	21	50
Table tennis	0	0	0	0
Volleyball	0	0	0	0
Wheelchair rugby	0	1	0	1
Wheelchair tennis	1	2	0	3
Total	63	39	47	149

== Archery ==
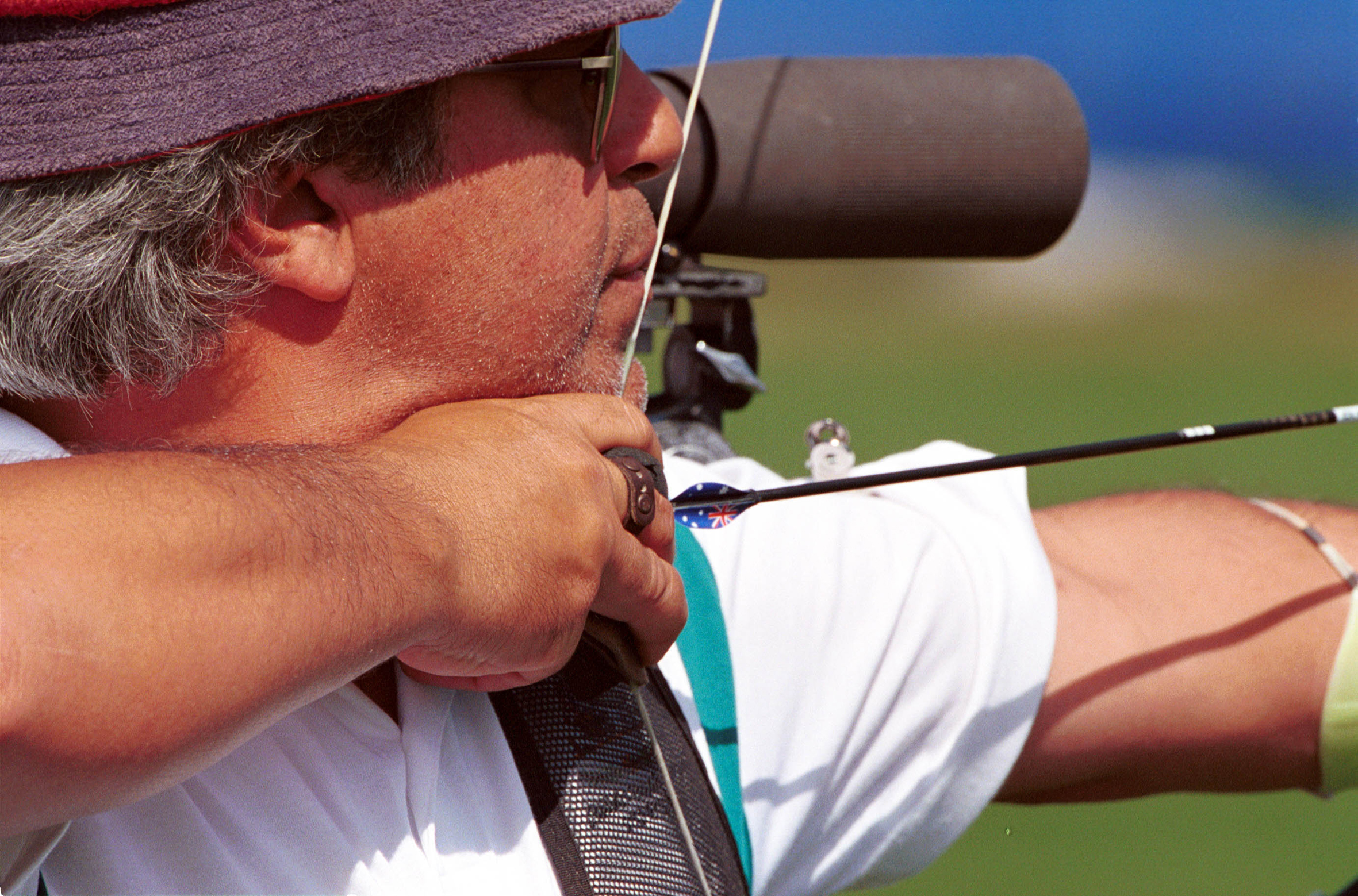
211000 - Archery Tony Marturano shoots - 3b - Sydney 2000 match photo

Australia represented in archery by:

Men	Arthur Fisk, John Marshall, Tony Marturano
Women	Natalie Cordowiner

Coaches – Robert de Bondt (Head), Hans Klar

Australia failed to win any medals.

== Athletics ==
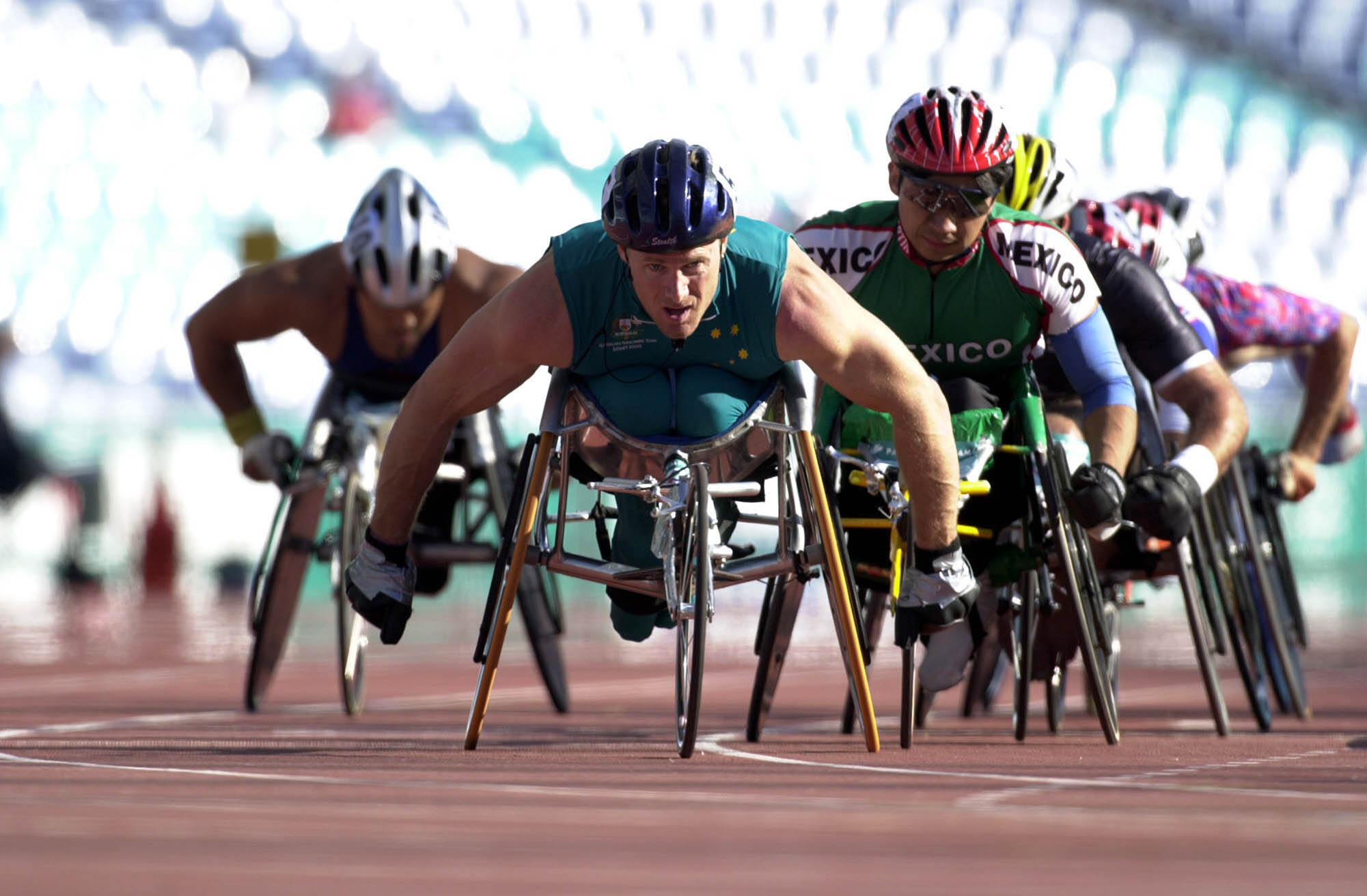
211000 - Athletics wheelchair racing 10km heat John Maclean action 2 - 3b - 2000 Sydney race photo

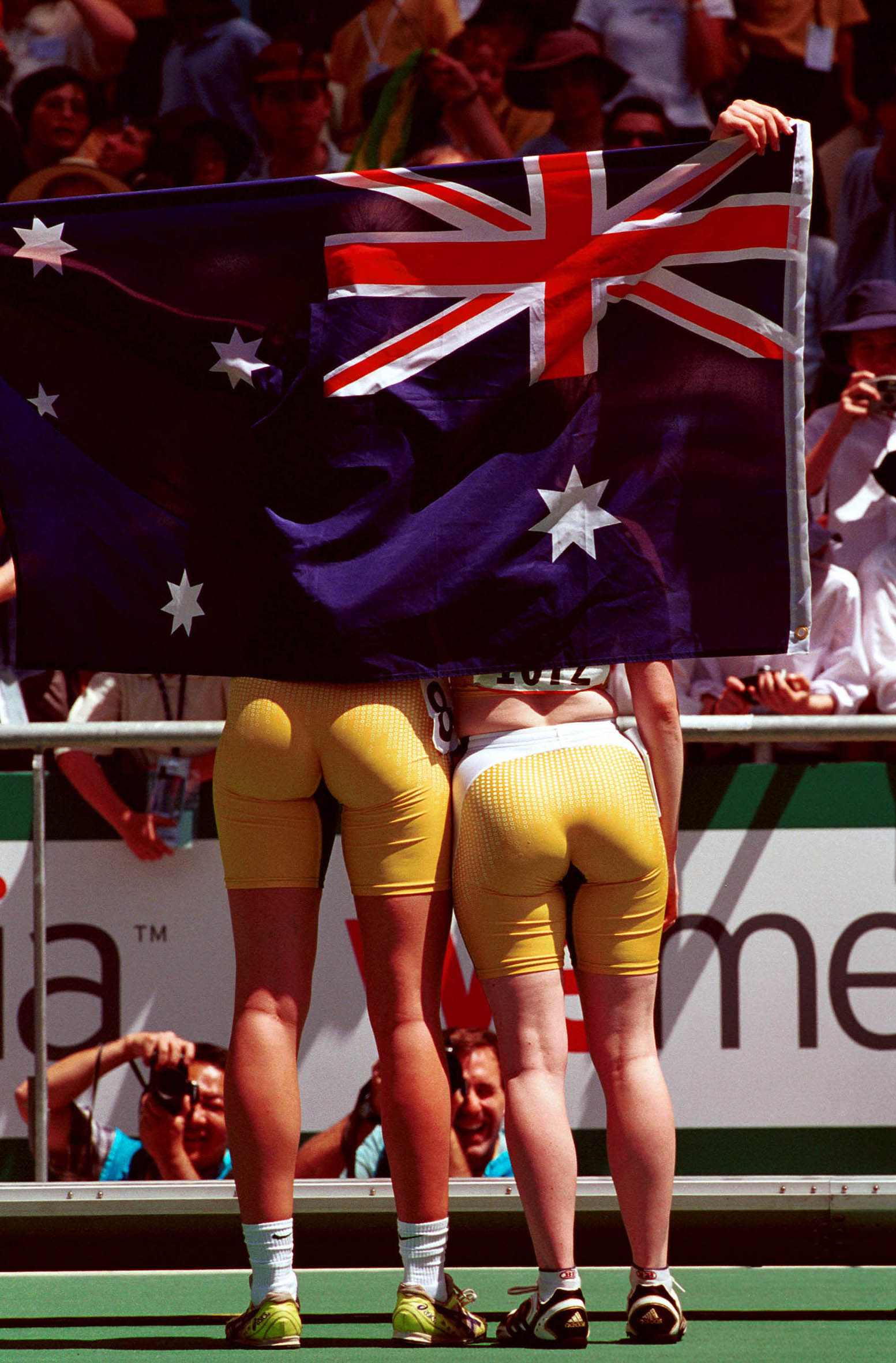
Australian track athletes Katrina Webb (left) and Alison Quinn (right), seen from behind with the Australian flag, celebrate with the crowd over their medal wins in the 100 m T38 at the 2000 Summer Paralympics. Quinn won gold and Webb won silver in this event.

Australia represented in athletics by:

Men	Shayne Allen, Kieran Ault-Connell, Wayne Bell, Malcolm Bennett, Anthony Biddle, Russell Billingham, Fabian Blattman, Damien Burroughs, Rick Cooke (guide for Jeffrey McNeill), Lee Cox, Roy Daniell, Mark Davies, Michael Dowling, Stephen Eaton, John Eden, Don Elgin, Kurt Fearnley, Anton Flavel, Heath Francis, Neil Fuller, Terry Giddy, Murray Goldfinch, Gerrard Gosens, Adrian Grogan, Brian Harvey, Bill Hunter (guide for Gerrard Gossens)), Clayton Johnson, Lachlan Jones, John Lindsay, Hamish MacDonald, John Maclean, Tim Matthews, Jeffrey McNeill, Paul Mitchell, Andrew Newell, Paul Nunnari, Sam Rickard, Ed Salmon (guide for Gerrard Gosens)), Russell Short, Greg Smith, Tim Sullivan, Darren Thrupp, Geoff Trappett, Steve Thorley (guide for Jeffrey McNeil), Dean Turner, Bruce Wallrodt, Stephen Wilson
Women	Angela Ballard, Joanne Bradshaw, Madelyn Ehlers, Rebecca Feldman, Patricia Flavel, Lynda Holt, Norma Koplick, Tanya Krome, Holly Ladmore, Lisa Llorens, Lisa McIntosh, Alison Quinn, Sharon Rackham, Allyson Richards (guide for Mark Davies), Louise Sauvage, Christie Skeleton, Frances Stanley, Meaghan Starr, Claire Summersgill, Katrina Webb, Debbie Wendt, Jodi Willis, Amy Winters

Coaches – Chris Nunn (Head), Di Barnes, Andrew Dawes, Scott Goodman, Brett Jones, Peter Negropontis, Lorraine Feddema, Robyn Hanson, Phil Badman, Rob Gorringe

Officials – Jason Hellwig (Manager), Hayden Clark, Barb Denson, Petrina Tierney, Jodie Worrall, Allyson Richards, Bill Hunter, Rick Cooke

Australia finished the number one country in athletics with 35 gold, 15 silver and 16 bronze medals. This was Australia's best performance in athletics at the Paralympics. Team highlights included: Timothy Sullivan's five gold medals, Greg Smith's five gold medals, Neil Fuller's four gold medals and one bronze medal, Lisa Llorens's three gold medals and one silver medal and Lisa McIntosh's three gold medals. Australia also won four relay gold medals.

=== Controversy ===
Well known Australian team member and opening ceremony cauldron lighter Louise Sauvage was a participant in the 800 meters T54 event. The race was interrupted by a crash around the 200m mark, leaving three competitors unable to finish. Race leaders Sauvage and Canadian rival Chantal Petitclerc were uninterrupted by the incident, with Petitclerc finishing first, followed by Sauvage in second. Video footage was reviewed by race referee Reg Brandis, and it was determined the competitors involved in the crash were significantly disadvantaged in their opportunity to win a medal. Two hours after the event a re-race was ordered after the final result was declared void. Andrew Dawes, coach of Sauvauge was quoted as saying,

"If she comes out and wins, people will say that she got a second bit at the cherry. And if she loses, she has lost twice."

In later events, Sauvage went on to win gold in the 1500m and 5000m, beating her rival Petitclerc.

== Basketball (Intellectual Disability) ==
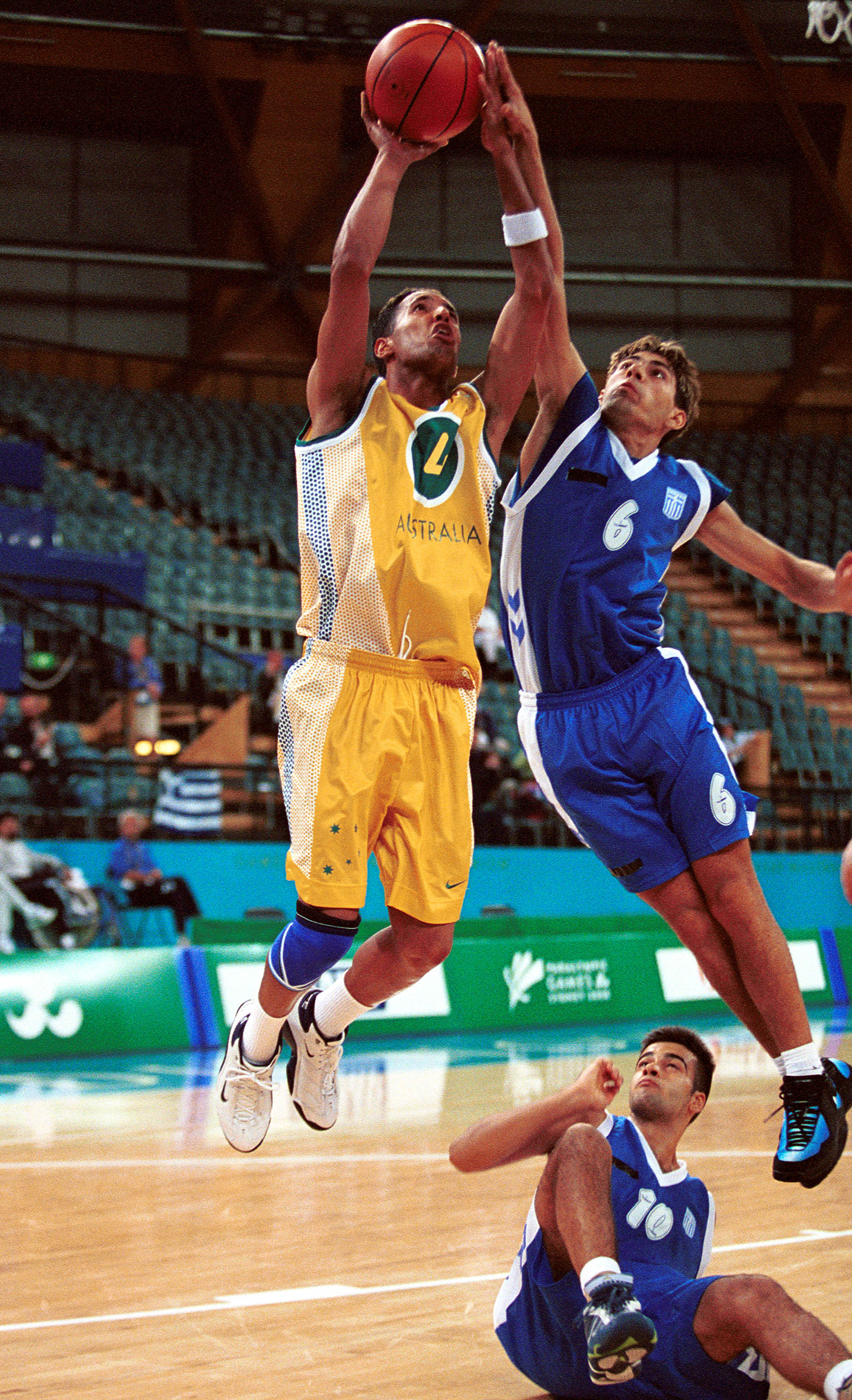
Australian ID basketball player Nicholas Maroney shoots the ball during competition at the 2000 Sydney Paralympics

Australia represented in basketball by:

Men	Frank Arratia, Lee Collins, Tim Devine, Simon Ishac, Bradley Lee, Tyson Lynch, Nicholas Maroney, Adam Meredith, Brett Phillips, Peter Willoughby, Brett Wilson, Justin Wrbik

Coaches – Tony Guihot (Head), Liz Fraser, Ian McLeod Officials – Michael Hudson (Manager)

The Australian team known as the 'Boomerangs' finished sixth in the tournament.

=== Controversy ===
The Spanish intellectually disabled basketball team beat Russia 87-63 to win the gold medal match. This win was later contended as a full investigation into the team was conducted due to accusations of fraud. It was later discovered that 10 of the 12 players were not disabled and that this deception was committed intentionally.

The IPC conducted a major investigation into the INAS-FID registration cards for all 244 athletes who participated in the Sydney games. A number of issues were discovered resulting in athletes with an intellectual disability being suspended from all IPC activities. The ban heavily affected the future Australian team as a large number of medals won during the Sydney games were by ID athletes. It was not until a meeting on 9 March 2001, where the IPC Executive Committee approved five resolutions pertaining to future participation. Unfortunately, it was concluded that these parameters would not be sufficient to expel cheating from the games and ID competitions were banned indefinitely. After the 2008 Paralympic games, a more robust criterion had been decided upon and the ban on intellectually disabled athletes lifted.

== Boccia ==
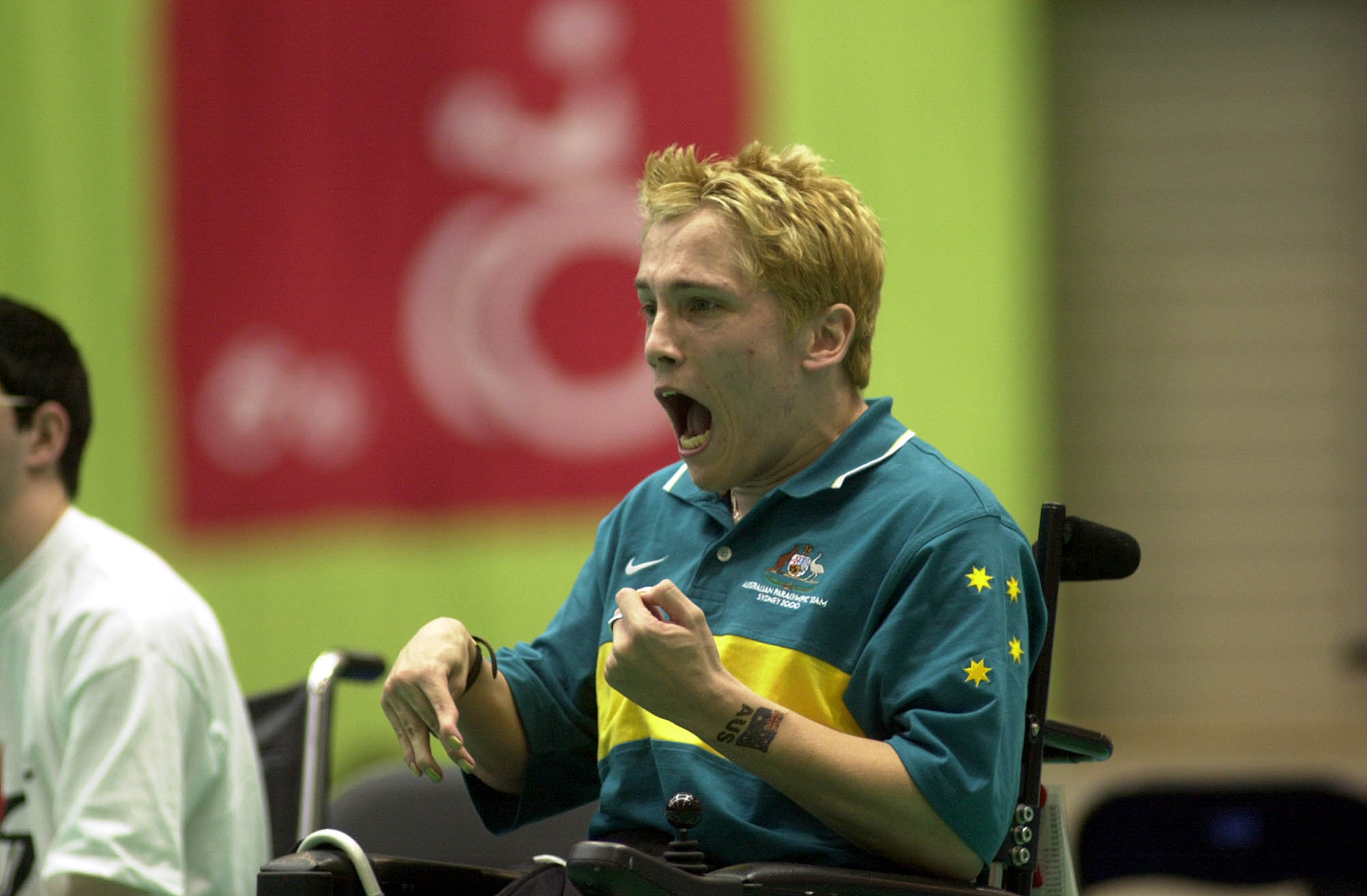
221000 - Boccia Scott Elsworth action - 3b - Sydney 2000 match photo

Australia represented in boccia by:

Men	Warren Brearley, Scott Elsworth, John Richardson
Women	Lyn Coleman, Angie McReynolds, Karen Stewart

Coaches – Joan Stevens (Head), Italo Vigalo Officials – Peggy Richardson, Barry Stewart, Sue Beencke, Annette Low, Emily Connell, Carla Brearley, June Kaese

Most athletes did not progress from the first round of pool games. Scott Eslworth was the best performed athlete making the quarter-finals.

== Cycling ==
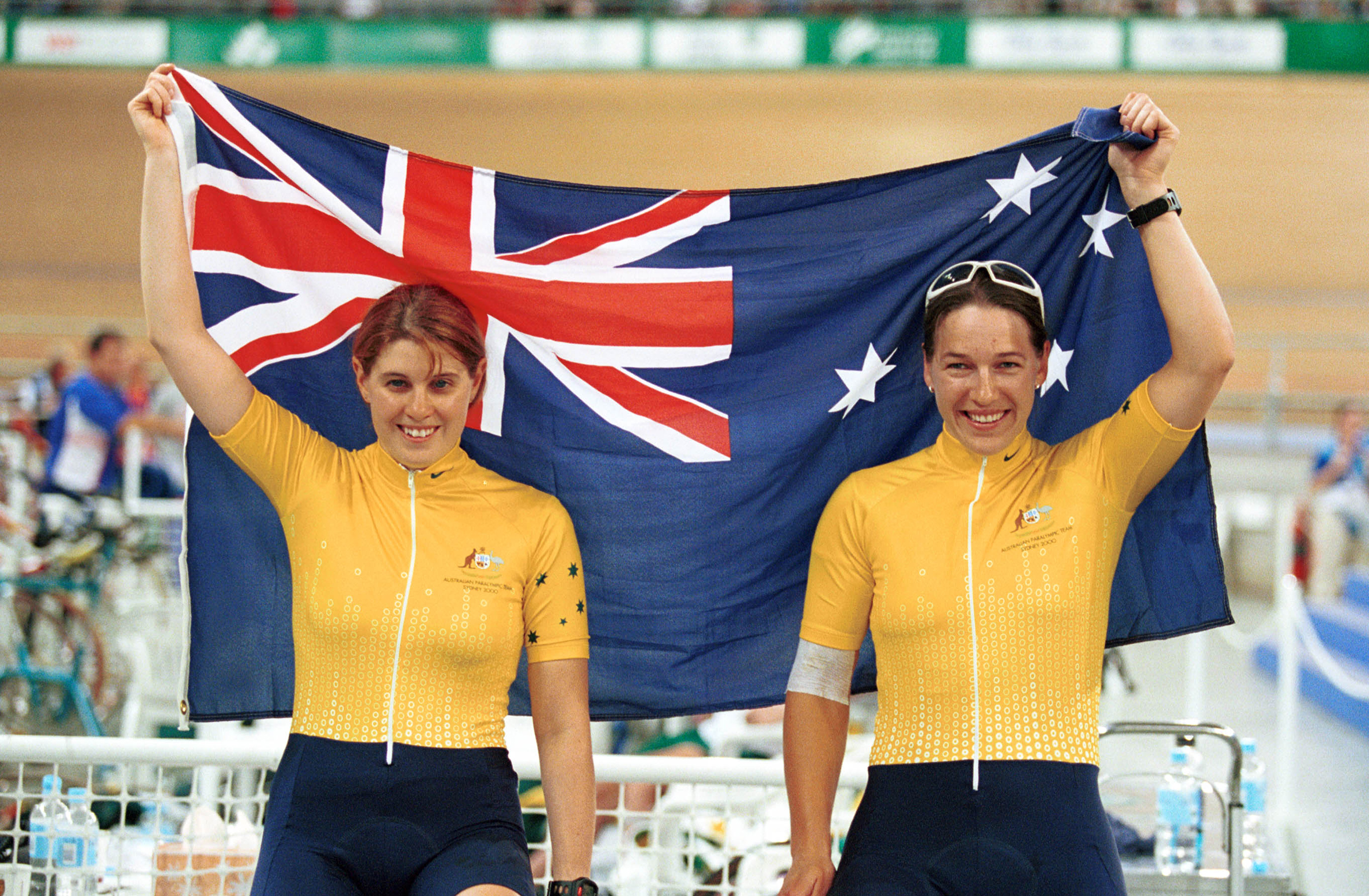
231000 - Cycling track Tania Modra Sarnya Parker Australian flag - 3b - 2000 Sydney race photo

Australia represented in cycling by:

Men	Greg Ball, Paul Clohessy, Matthew Gray, Steven Gray (Pilot for David Murray), Darren Harry (Pilot), Eddie Hollands (Pilot for Paul Clohessy), Peter Homann, Paul Lake, Mark le Flohic, Kieran Modra, David Murray, Paul O'Neill, Daniel Polson, Christopher Scott, Noel Sens, Russell Wolfe (Pilot for Christine Fisher)
Women	Christine Fisher, Lyn Lepore, Kerry Modra (Pilot for Kieran Modra ), Tania Modra (Pilot for Saryna Parker), Lynette Nixon (Pilot), Sarnya Parker

Coaches – Kevin McIntosh (Head), Darryl Benson, Radek Valenta Officials – Elsa Lepore (Manager), John Beer, Rebecca Tweedy

Australia won 10 gold, 3 silver and 8 bronze medals and finished the number one country overall.

== Equestrian ==
Australia represented in equestrian by:

Women	Rosalie Fahey, Sue Haydon, Julie Higgins, Marita Hird, Judy Hogan, Sue-Ellen Lovett, Anne Skinner

Coaches – Carolyn Lieutenant (Head), Gillian Rickard Officials – Judy Cubitt (Chef d'Equipe), Dinah Barron

Australia won 2 gold and 2 bronze medals in its second Paralympic competition. It came second to Great Britain in the overall medal tally. Due to the team's results, Head Coach Carolyn Lieutenant won the Australian Coaching Council's Female Coach of the Year award.

== Fencing ==
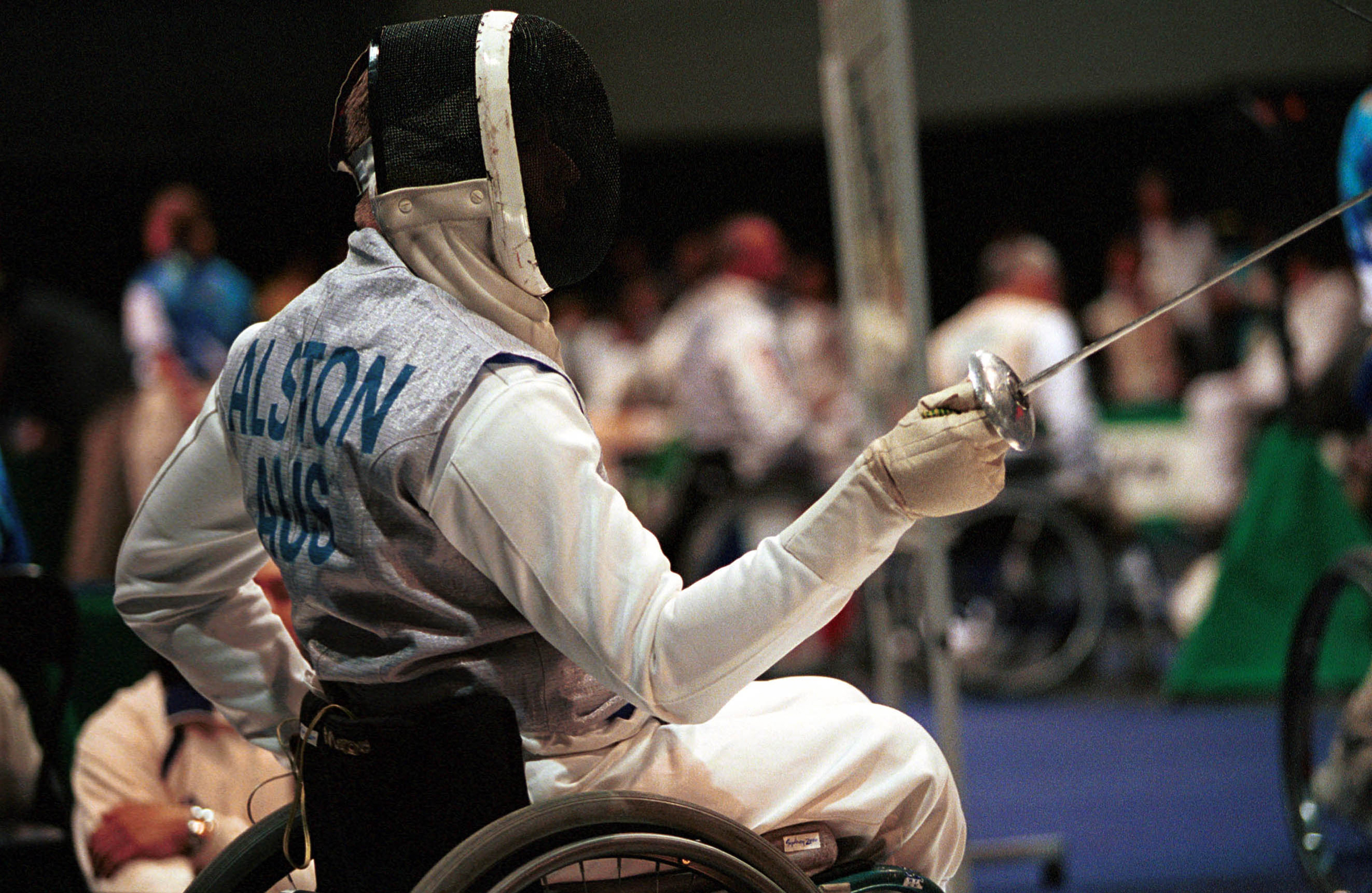
Australian wheelchair fencer Michael Alston in action during competition at the 2000 Sydney Paralympics

Australia represented in wheelchair fencing by:

Men	Michael Alston, Robert Goodwin

Coach Sally Kopiec (Head)

Australia did not win any medals but each athlete made the second round (top sixteen).

== Football (7 a Side) ==
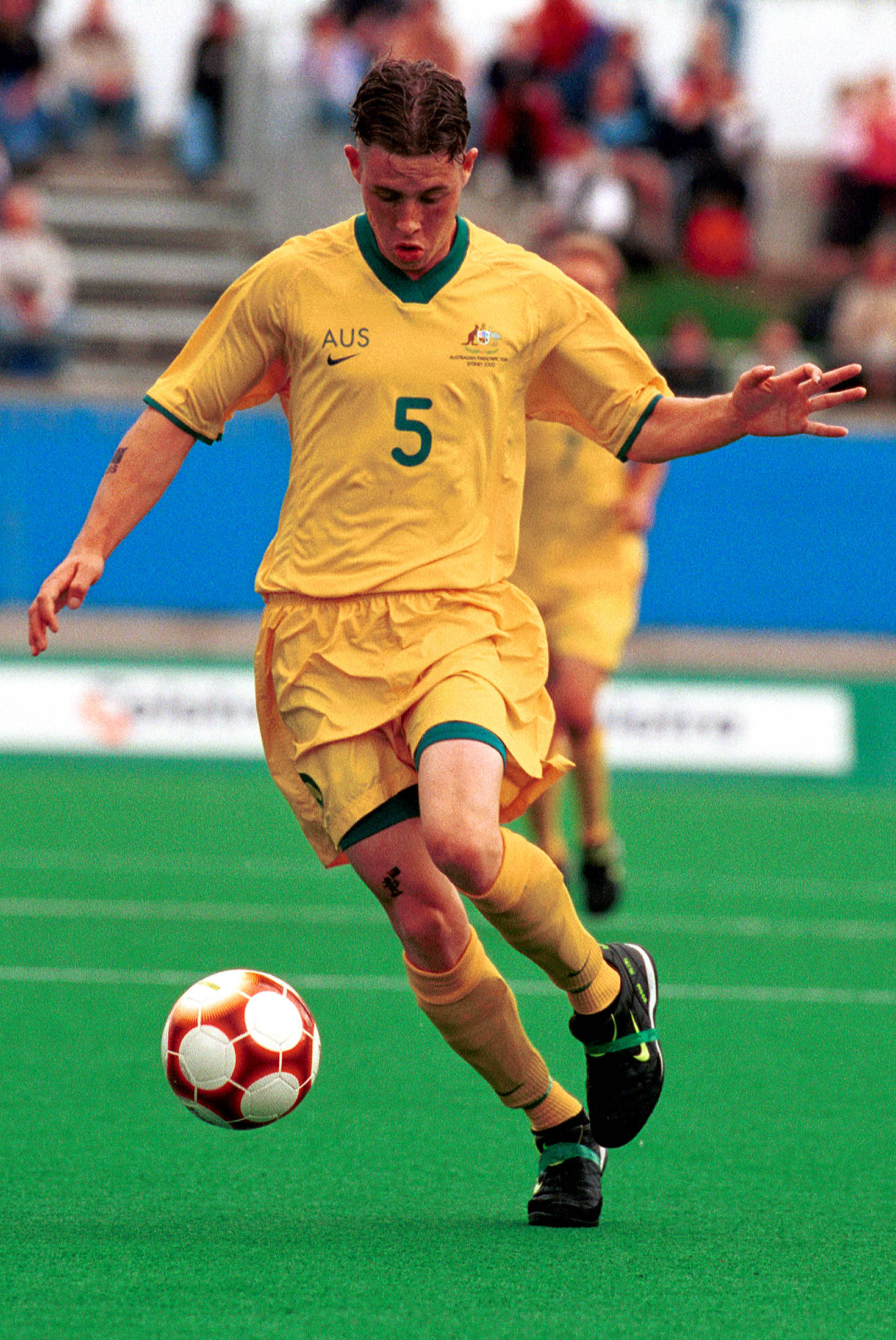
Australian football player Jason Rand in action on the field during competition at the 2000 Sydney Paralympics

Australia represented in football by:

Men	David Barber, Shaun Fedele, Eric Haddrick, Miguel Marcelino, Beau Menzies, Mark Morris, Andrew Panazzolo, Christopher Pyne, Jason Rand, Jeremy Thorpe, George Tonna

Coaches – Russell Marriott (Head), David Campbell

Officials – Corny van Eldik (Manager)

The team known as the 'Drillers' finished seventh in their first Paralympics.

== Goalball ==
Australia represented in goalball by:

Men	Rob Crestani, Kevin Frew, Paul Harpur, Troy King, Warren Lawton, Robbie Vogt
Women	Penny Bennett, Kerrie-ann King, Jo Ruba, Robyn Stephens

Men – Coaches – Sam Theodore (Head), Robert Apps

Women – Coaches – Terry Kenaghan (Head)

The men's team finished ninth out of twelve and the women's team finished eighth.

== Judo ==
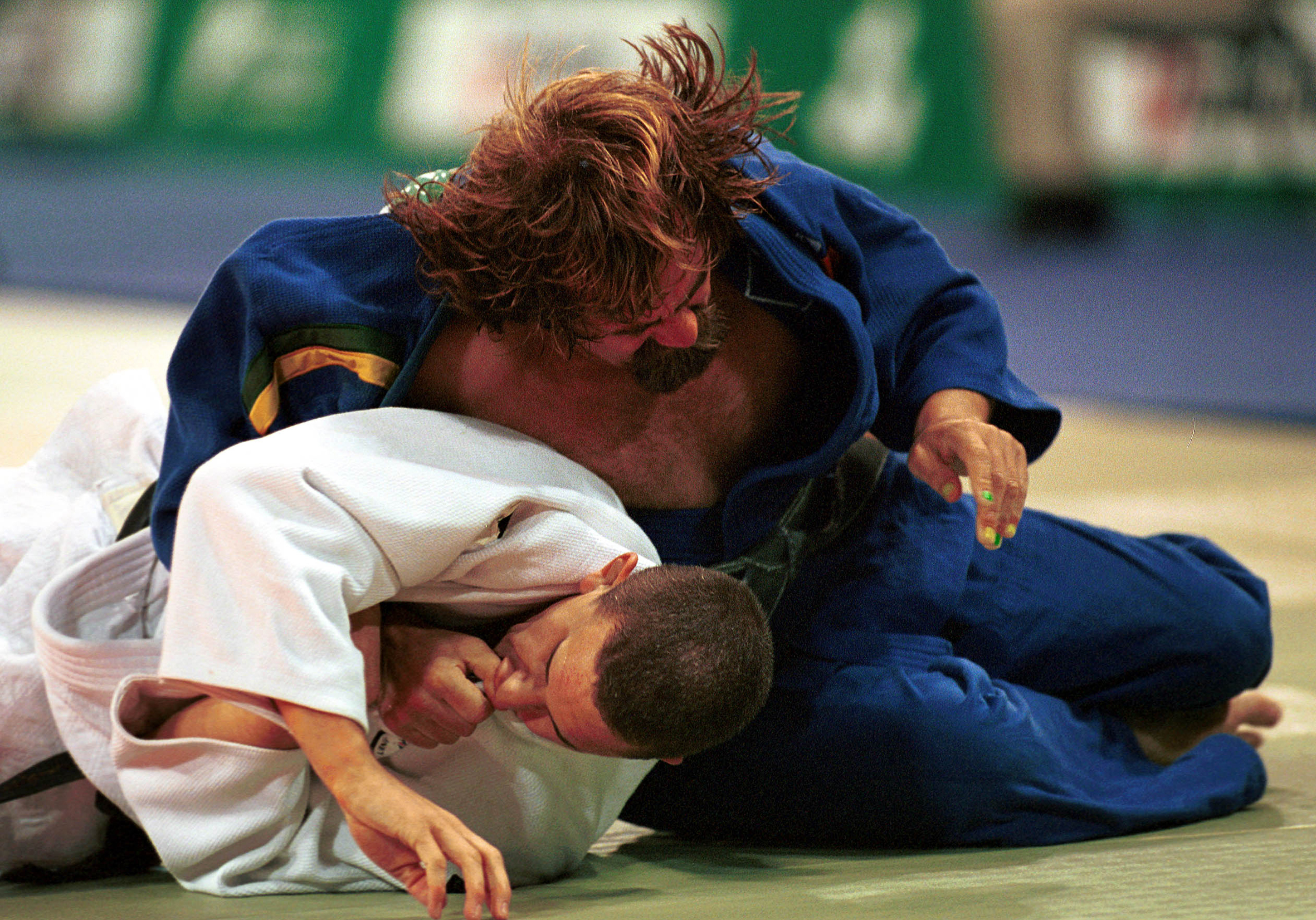
Australian judoka Anthony Clarke fights Great Britain's Ian Rose in competition at the Sydney 2000 Paralympics

Australia represented in judo by:

Men	Anthony Clarke

Coach – Trevor Kschamer (Head)

Australia's sole competitor Anthony Clarke, a former gold medalist, finished seventh.

== Powerlifting ==
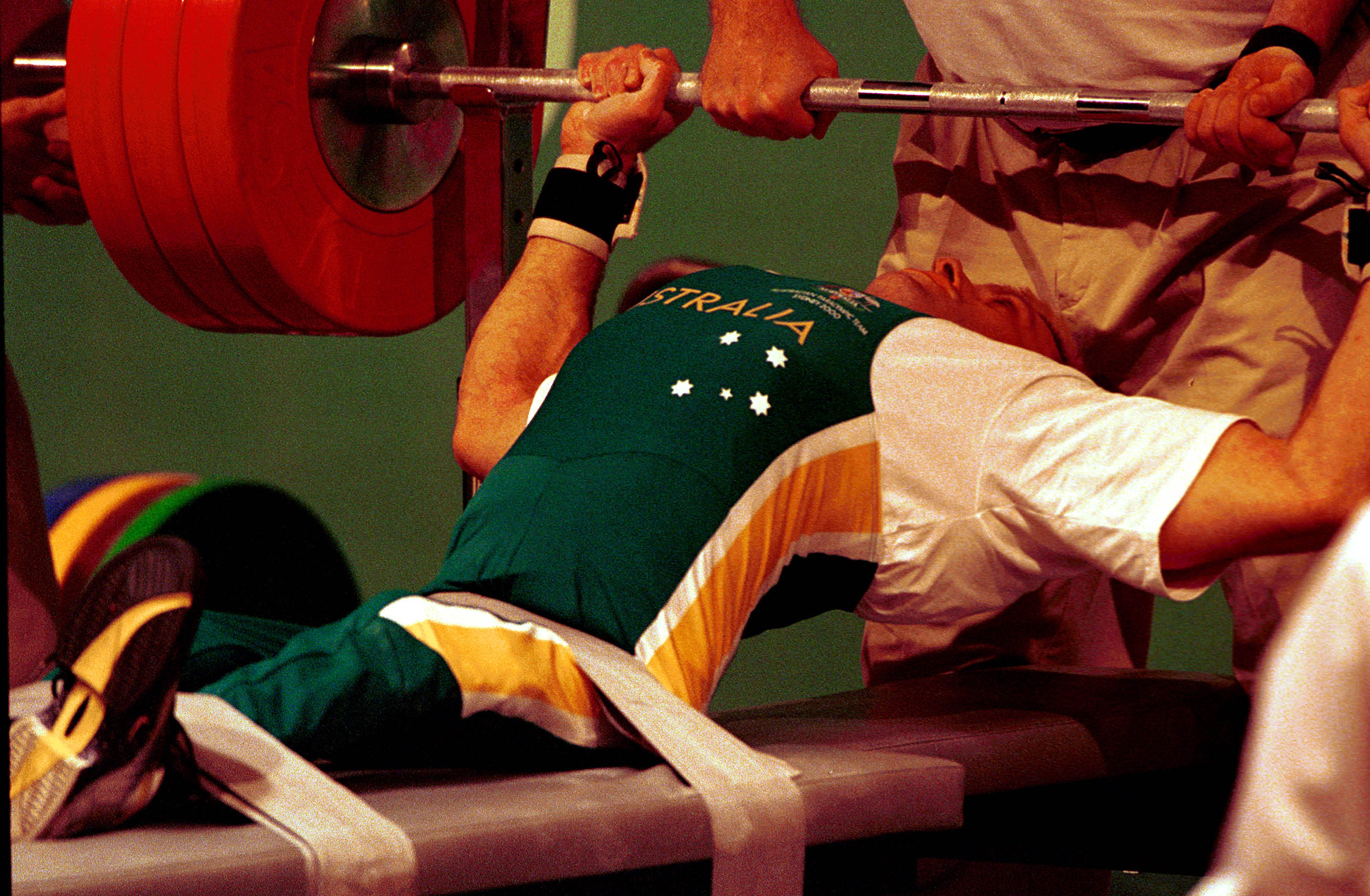
Australian powerlifter and silver medalist Richard Nicholson in action at the 2000 Sydney Paralympics

Australia represented in powerlifting by:

Men	Shaun Cavuoto, Darren Gardiner, Steve Green, Paul Hyde, Richard Nicholson, Kahi Puru, Wayne Sharpe
Women	Deahnne McIntyre, Julie Russell, Vicky Machen, Kim Neuenkirchen, Melissa Trafela, Sue Twelftree

Coaches – Blagoi Blagoev (Head), Ray Epstein

Australia won a silver medal with Richard Nicholson's performance.

== Sailing ==
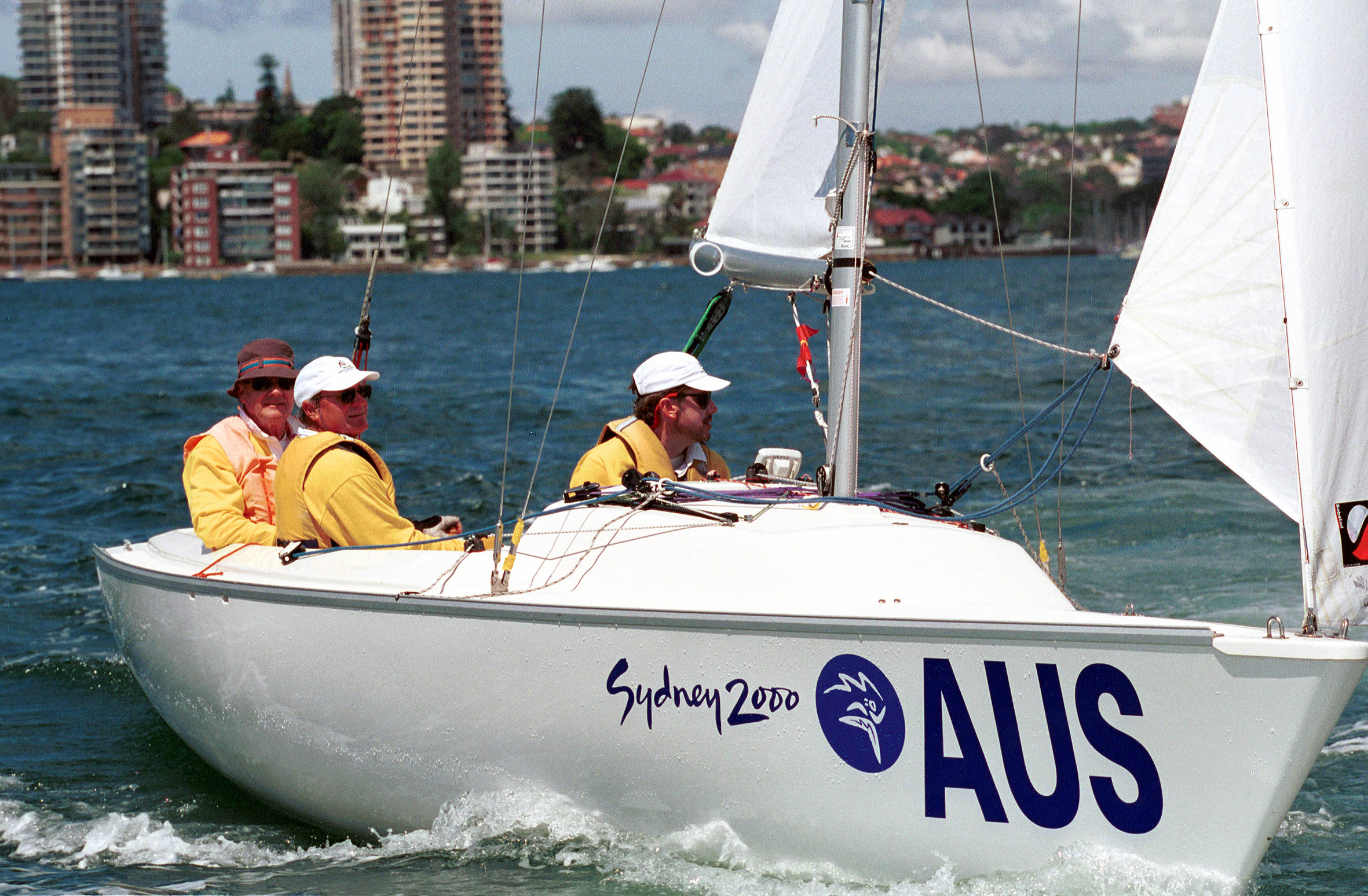
231000 - Sailing sonar Jamie Dunross Noel Robins Graeme Martin action 4 - 3b - 2000 Sydney race photo

Australia represented in sailing by:

Men	Jamie Dunross, Graeme Martin, Michael McLean, Noel Robins, Peter Thompson

Coaches – Lachlan Gilbert (2.4mR), Paul Eldrid (Sonar)

Officials – John Whitfield

Australia won the gold medal in the Sonar event and finished fourth in 2.4MR. It was the second placed nation in sailing.

The role of the Australian Bureau of Meteorology (ABM) was to be the "official provider of weather services", by providing specifically tailored services to the participants, spectators and event organisers for both the Olympic and Paralympic Games. Based on the requests of the SOCOG sailing management team, the sailing events were prioritised in terms of forecasting effort, in comparison to the other events and their respective venues.

The sailing events were hosted at the Sydney Harbour venue, as well as the offshore region adjacent to the entrance of the harbour. Due to its detailed and complex topography, this entire region experienced certain challenges in relation to the forecasting of surface winds. This included variations in wind speed and direction between "different reaches of the harbour", which occurred because of local sea to harbour and terrain circulations. Another challenge that was identified centred around the accuracy of the resolution required for wind forecasting being beyond the scope of the Australian operational numerical weather prediction (NWP) models of implementation. As a result of these factors, various statistical tools were developed to support the NWP output, and forecasts were provided across "three different harbour locations" in addition to a region offshore.

The statistical models utilised in preparation for and during the event, were NWP-based and high in resolution. The two models were one named LAPS 05 and one that only operated at 1-km and 5-km resolutions, and was a contribution made by the University of New South Wales Centre for Environmental Modelling and Prediction (CEMAP) that was available at 5-km and 1-km resolutions contribution made by the University. Alongside these statistical models, a further five were incorporated to facilitate the forecasting process in targeting these "small-scale wind variations". Following this, the evaluation of each model’s prediction skill was conducted, by drawing a comparison between the predicted data and data obtained via observation. This comparison was made mathematically, by using statistical indices which included the root-mean-square (RMS) error, "wind bearing error, magnitude of vector error", square error and Brier Skill score.

The Games marked the first event, where any member of the public and all the athletes participating were granted access to all the forecasting information that was specifically delivered to the organisers. The Bureau of Meteorology’s website was developed to provide both the event participants and their coaches with access to weather data. An Australian team of meteorologists was formed and made responsible for "interpreting the output" of an array of statistical and NWP models. Weather advice was provided by forecasters two weeks in advance to the Games beginning, during the training period and during the sailing test events conducted in 1999 and 1999. Hourly updates were provided in the form of site-specific forecasts for wave displacements and surface winds across various course locations, and the sail management team located in key boats present at the venue, was equipped with "onboard laptops" which were used to transmit the most updated weather information.

It has been revealed that the ABM received "numerous tributes" in relation to the "quality of its services", from SOCOG, individual athletes, meteorologists who were part of the sailing team, web clients and the International Sailing Federation (ISAF). Additionally, a meteorology team member shared that he was "impressed by the services available to athletes". However, he also expressed that the quality of these services was not consistent in its delivery to the organisers, and suggested that the service providers increase their focus on strongly interacting with "all client groups" when providing "future Olympics weather services".

== Shooting ==
Australia represented in shooting by:

Men	Ashley Adams, Stephen Guy, Stan Kosmala, Jeff Lane, James Nomarhas, Steven McCormack, Paul Schofield, Peter Shannon, Peter Tait, Peter Worsley
Women	Elizabeth Kosmala

Coaches – Yvonne Hill (Head), Anne Bugden, Evangelos Anagnostou Officials – Andre Jurich

Australia won a silver medal with Peter Tait's performance in the pistol. Six shooters made finals.

== Swimming ==
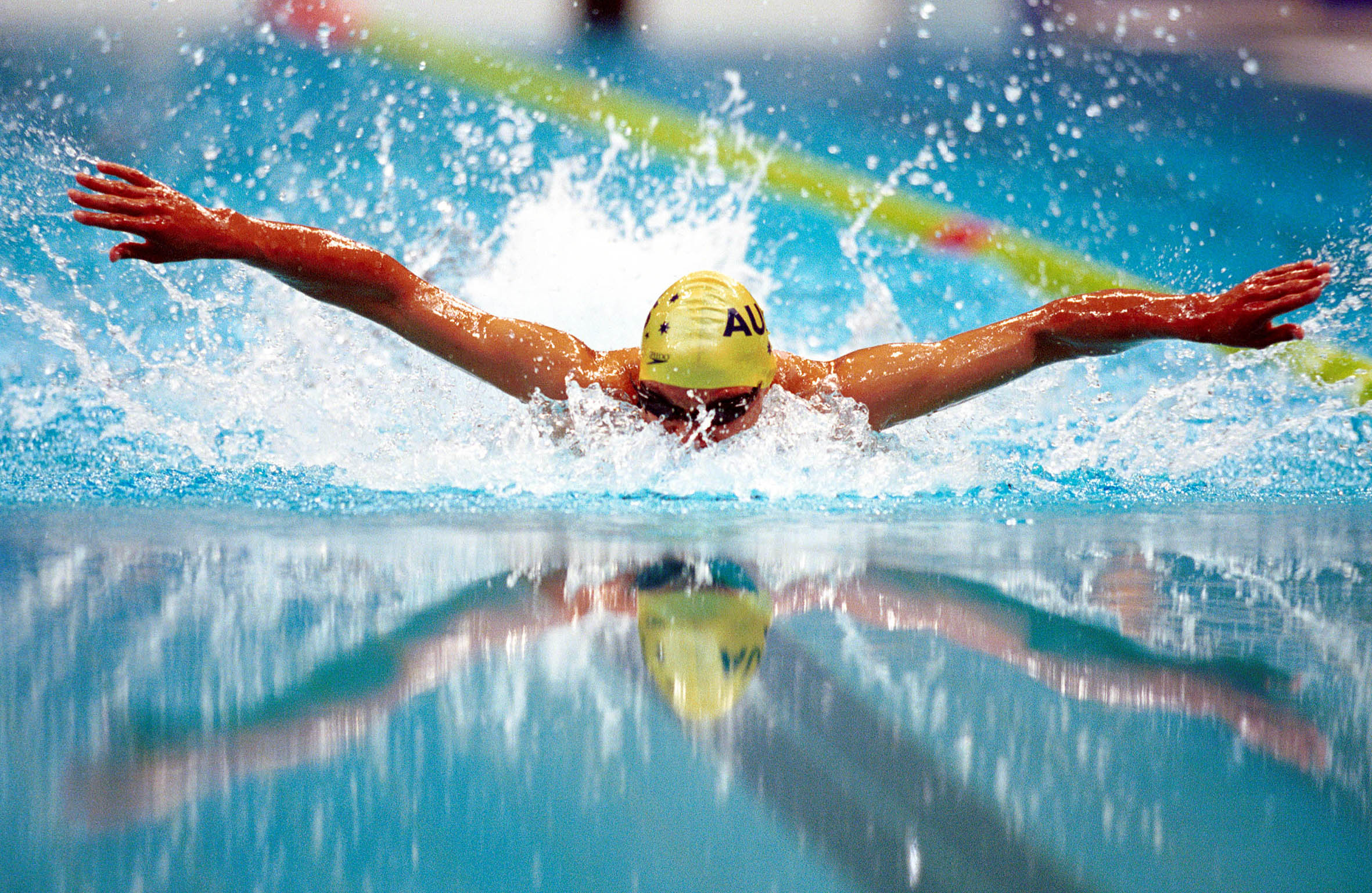
Daniel Bell in the pool during competition at the 2000 Summer Paralympics

I had the privilege of sitting down the front on one of the nights at the swimming. It was incredible to turn around to look behind me and see 15,000 people right at the back of the Aquatic Centre. Probably the view was not very good for some of them, yet the people were there. They enjoyed it and I am sure found the whole experience uplifting.

— Alan Ashton, Parliament Member

Australia represented in swimming by:

Men	Mark Altmann, Ben Austin, Paul Barnett, Daniel Bell, Tom Bridge, Scott Brockenshire, Kingsley Bugarin, Brendan Burkett, Dominic Collins, Paul Cross, Cameron de Burgh, Patrick Donachie, Justin Eveson, Jeff Hardy, Alex Harris, Michael Palfery, Stewart Pike, Brett Reid, David Rolfe, Alastair Smales, Christian Stafford, Shane Walsh
Women	Alicia Aberley, Katerina Bailey, Petrea Barker, Denise Beckwith, Melissa Carlton, Kate Church, Priya Cooper, Tracey Cross, Gemma Dashwood, Nicole Davey, Janelle Falzon, Amanda Fraser, Megan Grant, Judith Green, Sarah Houlbolt, Alicia Jenkins, Marayke Jonkers, Dianna Ley, Karni Liddell, Tamara Nowitzki, Kirra O'Cass, Siobhan Paton, Casey Redford, Ellen Steele, Brooke Stockham, Lucy Williams, Stacey Williams, Melissa Willson, Elizabeth Wright

Coaches – Matthew Brown (Head), Greg Rochowcyzk, John Ornsby, Wanda Smales, Brendan Keogh, Frank Hohmann, Trent Patten, Dick Orbell Officials – Michael Scott (Manager), Linda Garsden, John Stamoulos, Michael Martin, Jenny Lambert

Australia had its largest ever swimming team and it won 14 gold, 15 silver and 21 bronze medals. It finished fifth on the gold medal tally and second on the overall medal tally. During the competition, Australian swimmers set 42 Australian records, 14 Paralympic records and 7 world records.

== Table Tennis ==
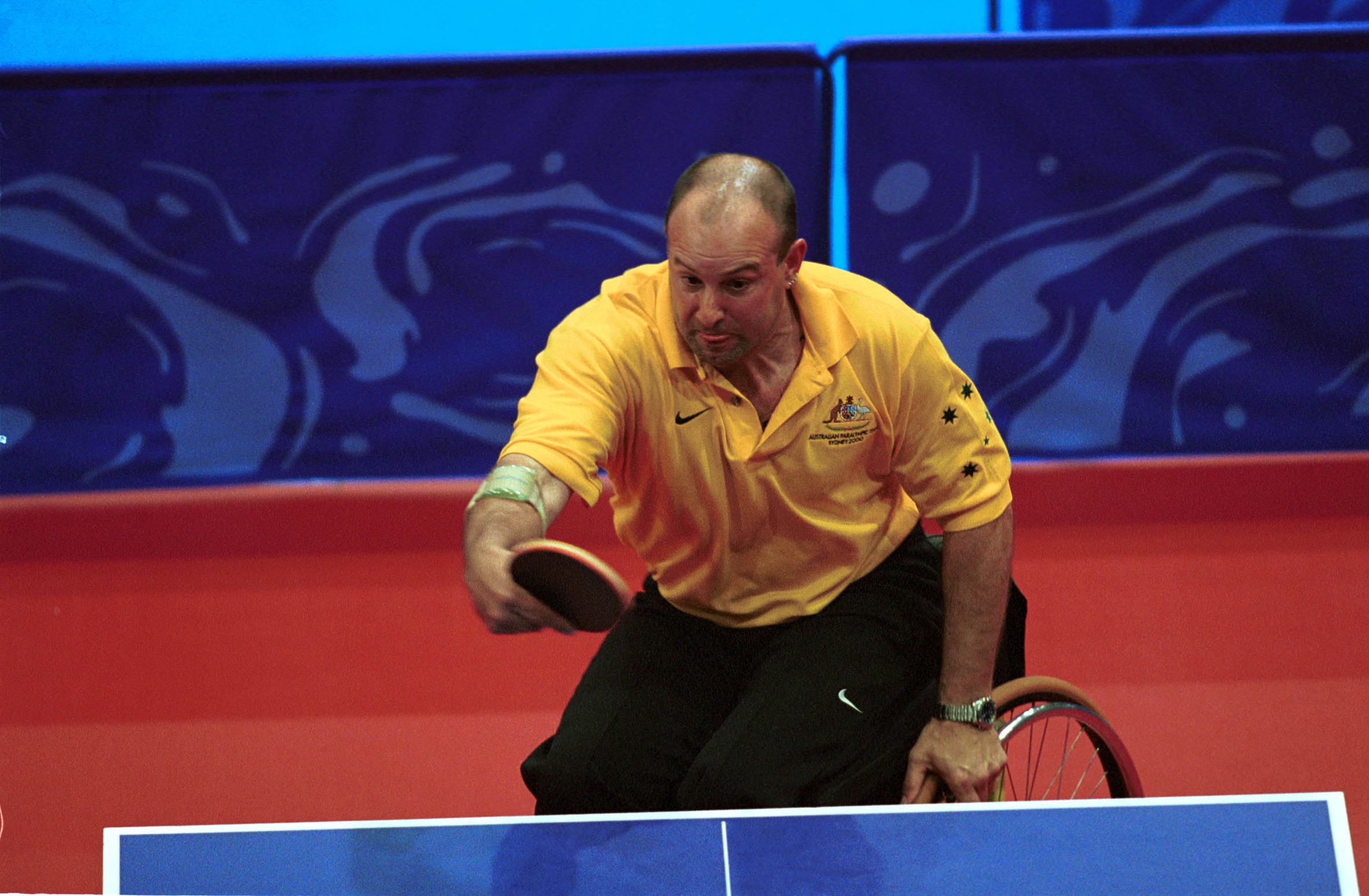
251000 - Table Tennis Ross Schurgott action 2 - 3b - Sydney 2000 match photo

Australia represented in table tennis by:

Men	Bill Medley, Ross Schurgott

Coaches – Joe Hoad (Head) Officials – Carmel Medley and Roger Massie

Australia was given two wild card entries due to it being the host nation. It did not win any medals as no athlete progressed past the first round.

== Volleyball ==
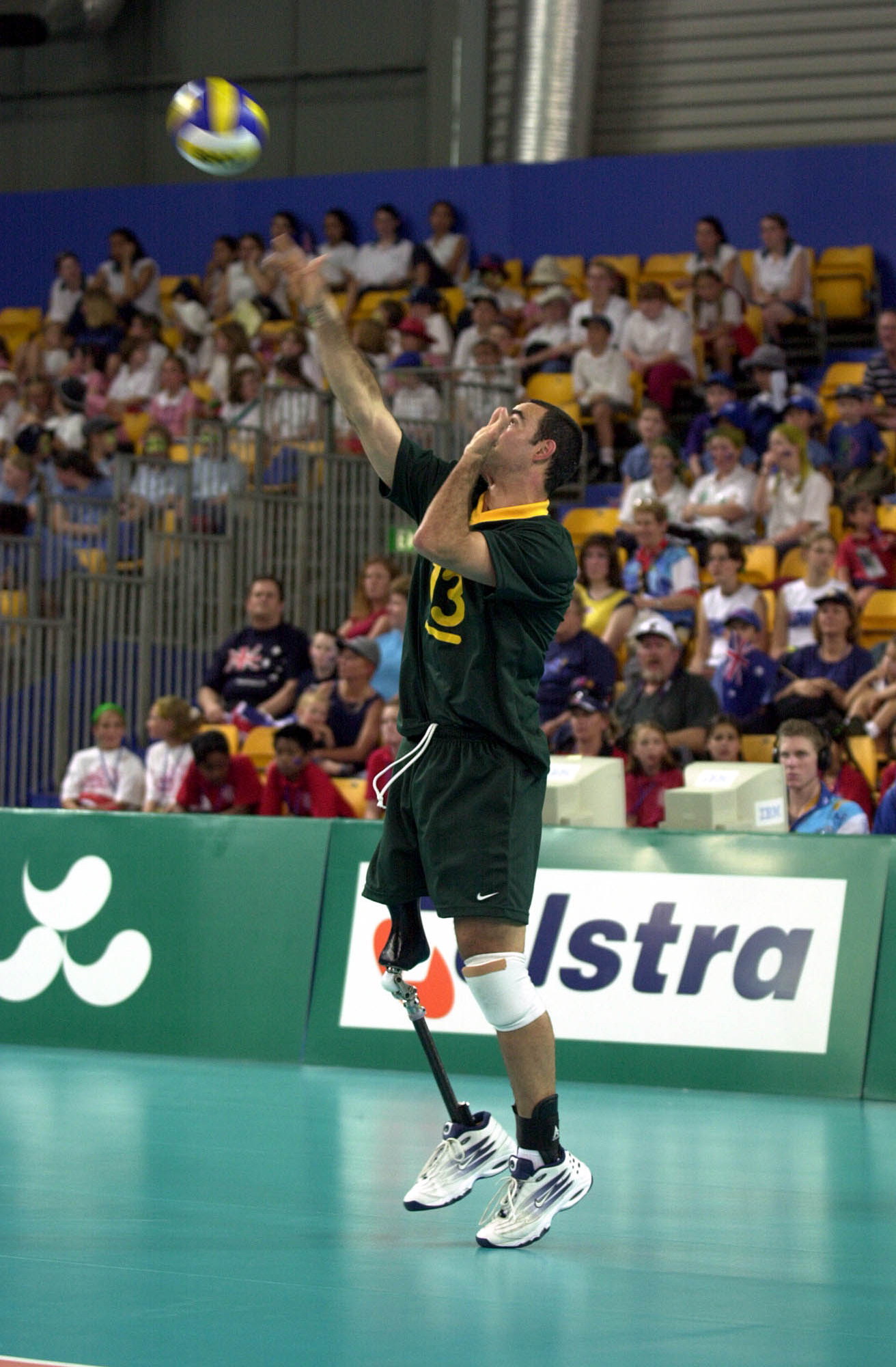
Australian standing volleyball player Grant Prest serves the ball during 2000 Summer Paralympics match

Australia represented in volleyball by:

Sitting

Men	Edward Bray, Paul Croft, Darren Gay, Albert Lee, Brant North, Kevin Price, Glenn Pyne, Brett Roworth, Greg Sobczak, Bruce Thompson, Mark Whiteman

Coaches' – Weiping Tu, Glenn Stewart Officials – Graham Golley (Manager)

The team known as the 'Crabs' finished eleventh out of twelve but had their first ever international victory by defeating the United States.

Standing

Men	Daniel Byrne, Nick Coburn, Japhy Duldig, Joe Egan, Greg Hammond, Brett Holcombe, Nick Kaiser, Adam Lusted, Bill McHoul, Steven Neal, Grant Prest, Nigel Smith

Coaches – Kieron Rochester (Head), Gary Jenness

The team known as the 'Volleyroos' finished eighth. At the end of the tournament, the International Paralympic Committee determined that the sport would not be part of the 2004 Athens Games due to it failing to meet IPC criteria.

== Wheelchair Basketball ==
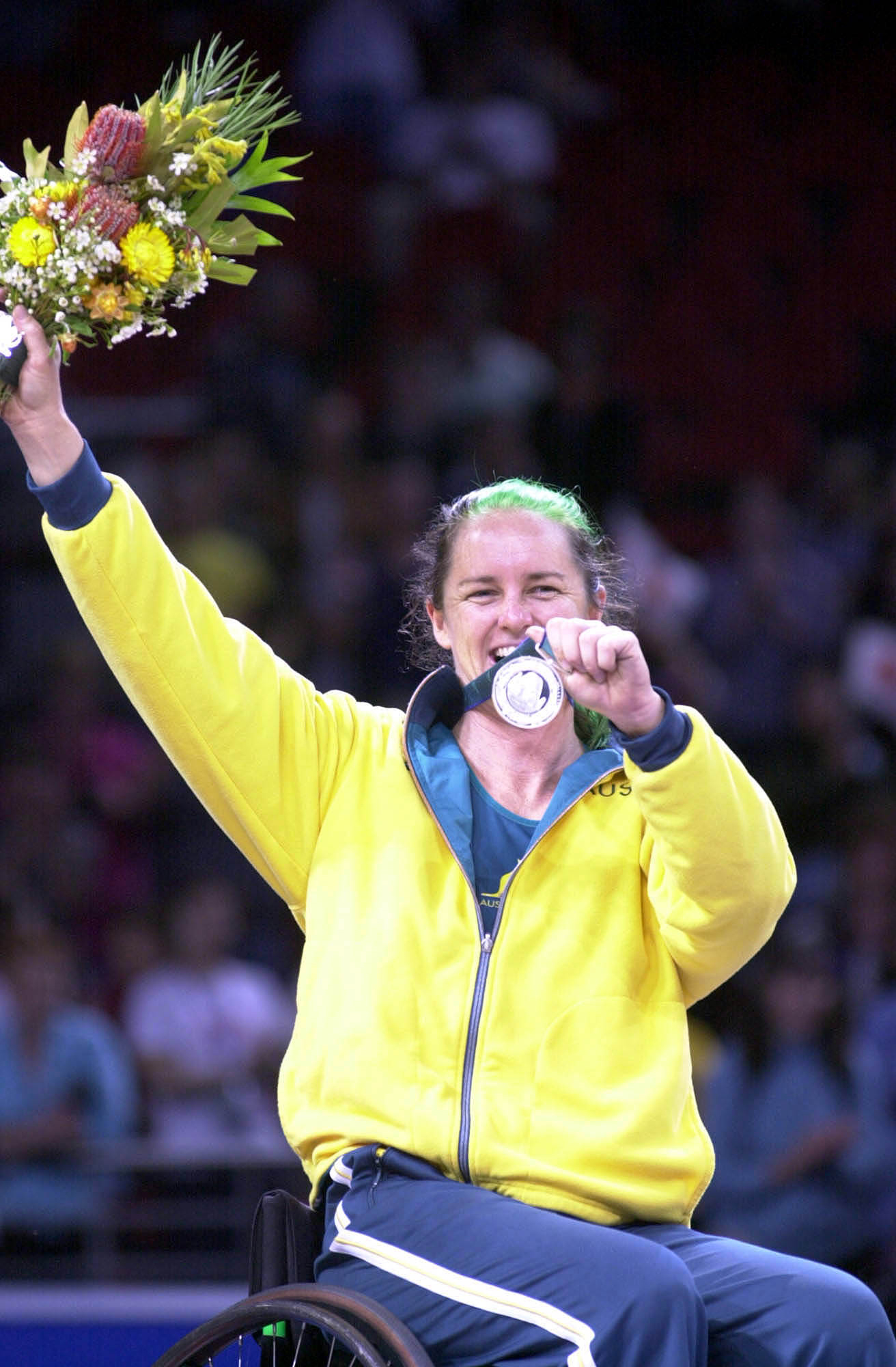
Australian wheelchair basketball player Liesl Tesch celebrates with her silver medal and bouquet at the 2000 Sydney Paralympics

Australia represented in wheelchair basketball by:

=== Women's tournament ===
Women	Julianne Adams, Amanda Carter, Paula Coghlan, Mellissa Dunn, Karen Farrell, Alison Mosely, Lisa O'Nion, Donna Ritchie, Nadya Romeo, Sharon Slann, Liesl Tesch, Jane Webb
Officials	Coaches – Peter Corr (Head), Tracy York, Rob Beveridge; Managers – Kevin Smith (Manager)

Group A Results and Standings

Group A
Rank	Team	Pld	W	L	PF:PA	Pts	AUS	NED	USA	GBR
1	Australia	3	3	0	125:74	6	x	38:26	44:36	43:12
2	Netherlands	3	2	1	105:85	5	26:38	x	45:26	34:21
3	United States	3	1	2	120:119	4	36:44	26:45	x	58:30
4	Great Britain	3	0	3	63:135	3	12:43	21:34	30:58	x

Semi-final Australia 45 defeated Japan 33

Gold Medal Match Canada 46 defeated Australia 27

=== Men's tournament ===
Men	Troy Andrews, Sandy Blythe, David Gould, Shaun Groenewegen, Gerry Hewson, Adrian King, Michael McFawn, Nick Morris, Brad Ness, Shane Porter, Brook Quinn, Troy Sachs
Officials	Coaches – Bob Turner (Head), Michael Walker, Richard Oliver; Managers – Fred Heidt (Manager), John Camens, Graham Gould

Group B Results and Standings

Group B
Rank	Team	Pld	W	L	PF:PA	Pts	NED	FRA	AUS	SWE	JPN	KOR
1	Netherlands	5	5	0	331:243	10	x	76:51	48:47	62:45	62:52	83:48
2	France	5	4	1	296:272	9	51:76	x	62:54	51:50	67:44	65:48
3	Australia	5	3	2	311:233	8	47:48	54:62	x	69:54	64:36	77:33
4	Sweden	5	2	3	266:280	7	45:62	50:51	54:69	x	60:43	57:55
5	Japan	5	1	4	239:296	6	52:62	44:67	36:64	43:60	x	64:43
6	South Korea	5	0	5	227:346	5	48:83	48:65	33:77	55:57	43:64	x

Source: Paralympic.org

Quarter-finals United States 62 defeated Australia 52

Fifth to Eight Playoffs Australia 61 defeated Germany 53

Fifth - Sixth Playoff Australia 50 defeated France 47

The men's team known as the 'Rollers' lost their quarter-final to the United States and finished fifth. The women's team known as 'Gliders' won the silver medal after losing to Canada in the final. It was their most successful Paralympics.

== Wheelchair Rugby ==
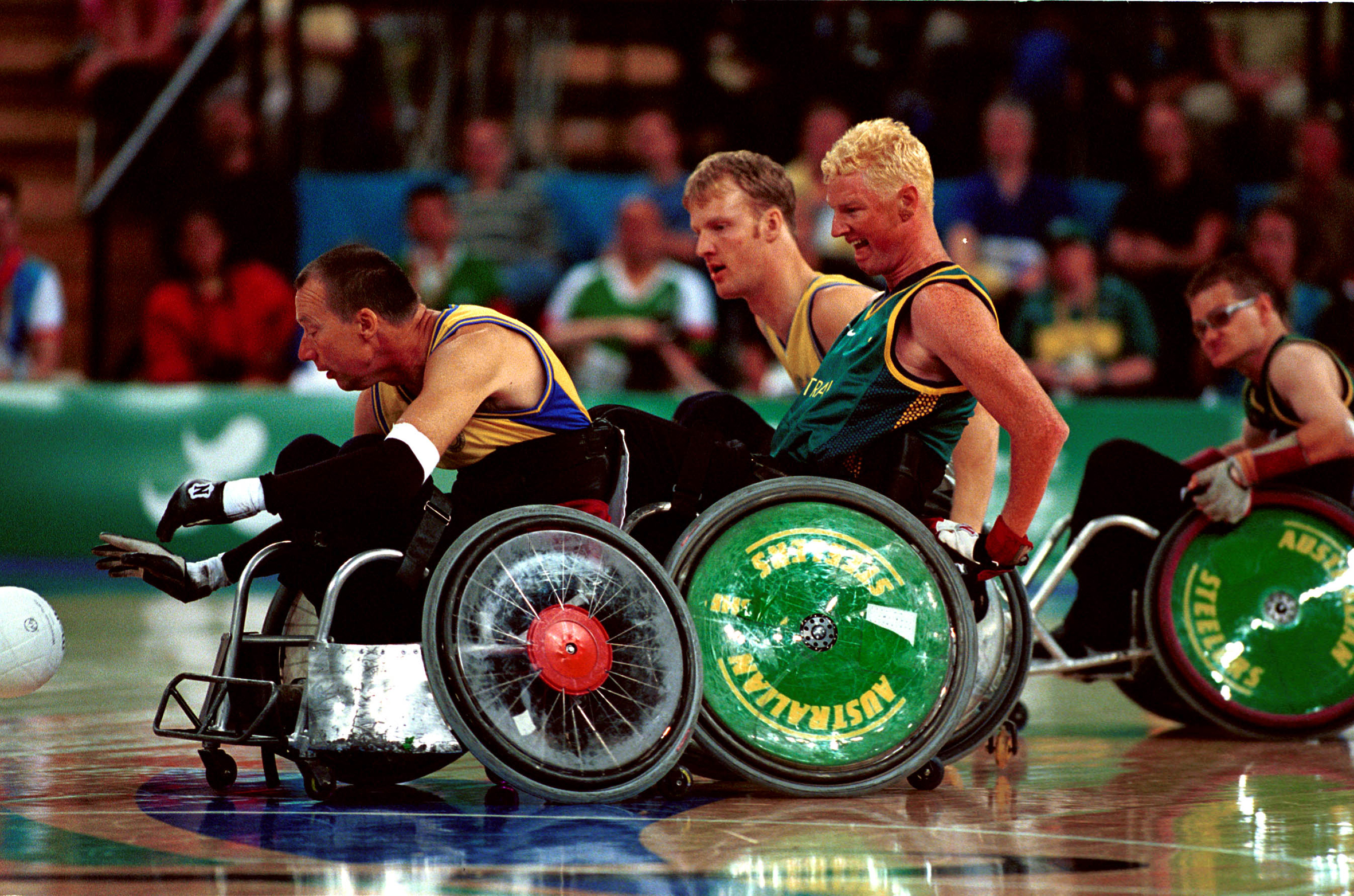
271000 - Wheelchair rugby Brad Dubberley attacks - 3b - 2000 Sydney match photo

Australia represented in wheelchair rugby by:

Men	Bryce Alman, Brett Boylan, Cliff Clarke, Garry Croker, Brad Dubberley, Nazim Erdem, Peter Harding, George Hucks, Tom Kennedy, Craig Parsons, Steve Porter, Patrick Ryan

Coaches – Terry Vinyard (Head), Glenn Stephens, Nicholas Bailey Officials – Kim Elwood (Manager), David Bonavita (Chief Mechanic), Wendy Poole

The team known as the 'Steelers' won the silver medal after losing to the World and Paralympic champions, United States by one point in the final.

Group A Results and Standings

Group A
Rank	Team	Pld	W	L	PF:PA	Pts	USA	AUS	SWE	SUI
1	United States (USA)	3	3	0	125:83	6	x	29:27	54:29	42:27
2	Australia (AUS)	3	2	1	108:97	5	27:29	x	39:36	42:32
3	Sweden (SWE)	3	1	2	109:128	4	29:54	36:39	x	44:35
4	Switzerland (SUI)	3	0	3	94:128	3	27:42	32:42	35:44	x

Semi-finals

Australia 40 defeated New Zealand 39

Gold Medal Match

United States 32 defeated Australia 31

== Wheelchair Tennis ==
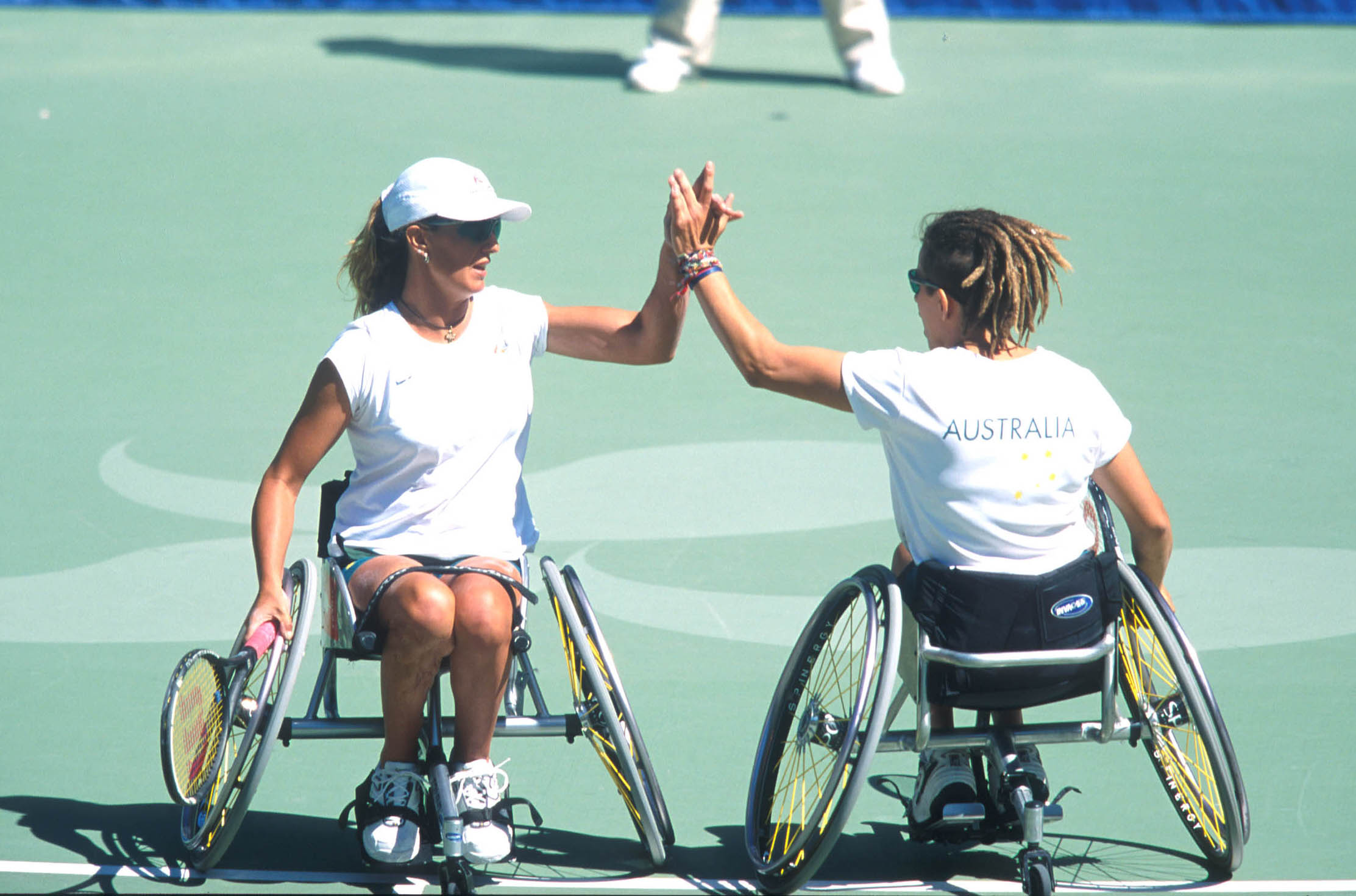
141100 - Wheelchair tennis Daniela Di Toro Branka Pupovac hands 2 - 3b - 2000 Sydney match photo

Australia represented in wheelchair tennis by:

Men	David Hall, David Johnson
Women	Daniela di Toro, Branka Pupovac

Coach – Greg Crump (Head)

Australia had very impressive results making three finals out of four and winning 1 gold and 2 silver medals. David Hall took home one gold and one silver medal.

== Administration and support ==
Members of the headquarters team were:

Administration

Paul Bird ( Chef de Mission), Keith Gilbert (Assistant Chef de Mission), Greg Campbell (Assistant Chef de Mission), Tony Naar (Assistant Chef de Mission), Robyn Smith (Assistant Chef de Mission), John Watkins, Rod Anderson, Melinda Richards, Eve Bampfield, Carmel Williams, Graham Edwards, Rodney Nugent, Anne Brunnell, Rebecca Hill, Dianne Watson, Shona Halson, Andrea Davidson, Nadia Brandon-Black, Murray Lydeamore, Karen Hellwig, Louise Mogg, Simon Reffold, Jillian Lennon, Bronwyn Campbell, Joel Lipman, Kellie Urquhart, Jenni Banks, Tracy Lawrence, Ross Boyd, Sharon Palmer, Michael Blucher, Peter Kelly, Victoria Carthew, Sally Nelson, Phyllis Sakinofsky

Australia Medical Staff

Jane Buckley (Director), David Millions, Kevin Boundy, Syd Bourke, Kathy Merlehan, Jenny Nucifora, Craig Boettcher, Greg Ungerer, Mark Stokes, David Spurrier, Dimi Argyros, Allan Thomas, Joann Marr, Maria Di Michele, Vicki de Prazer, Gavin Freeman, John Woods

== Community links and volunteers ==
The SPOC identified the importance of reaching out the community in order to develop community awareness of the games, and to improve community relations. To achieve this, Community Support Programs were developed by the SPOC in 1998 and included partnership programs, a national education program, Ride 2000 and sports demonstrations. The aims of these initiatives were to "establish links with multicultural communities, service groups, local community events and disability groups to enhance community support"'

One of the initiatives from the SPOC in partnership with the NSW Department of Education and Training (DET), was the introduction of a new curriculum to schools called 'Set no limits'. The package involved an official school excursion to the Paralympic Games for Australian school children, and included the official mascot of the games, 'Lizzie' the frill neck lizard. The National Education Program (NEP) aimed for school children to understand how to be more tolerant, however no official measures of attitudes were evaluated.

Demonstrations of disability sport were also conducted at Australian schools, shopping centres and other public events. These demonstrations were organised by the SPOC and APC, and included popular Paralympic sports such as wheelchair basketball and wheelchair rugby. The appearances of the Australian team athletes in these demonstrations was originally volunteer and un-paid, however later a fee of $500 was negotiated per appearance.

Rides 2000 was another community awareness initiative developed by Sue-Ellen Lovett, an equestrian rider and director of the Sydney 2000 Paralympic Games Board. During this time Lovett participated in long distance rides to regional Australia in order to raise awareness of, and funds for the Paralympic Games. The rides included:

- 1997: Melbourne to Sydney
- 1998: Brisbane to Sydney
- 1999: Adelaide to Sydney
- 2000: Moree to Sydney

These 'community support programs' assisted in raising community awareness in the lead up to the games. For these reasons, and also due to the success of the previous Olympic games, a 'party atmosphere' was created which continued into the Paralympic games. This attracted numerous spectators to the games, including new groups joining the 'Paralympic party'. These groups encompassed "those who were critical of the Olympics but supported the Paralympics as it was not perceived as a corporatised event", seniors and also school children who could not afford the Olympic Games.

The Australian Government at the time also showed political support of the games. A post-Games dinner was held including 70 parliamentarians, that aimed to ensure continual government and private funding for the games in years to come. Former Deputy Leader of the Federal Coalition, Tim Fischer was also involved in the Games, overseeing the Paralympic Village in the role of mayor.

The community was also involved in the games through volunteer roles. The partnership between the SPOC and SOCOG lead to 15,000 volunteers being recruited for the Paralympic games. Volunteers were trained by Technical and Further Education (TAFE) New South Wales (NSW). The volunteers participated in a range of disability awareness training activities in preparation for the games. It was also noted that a "larger number of volunteers had disabilities themselves, highlighting the accessibility of all aspects of the venues and overlay". Two incidents were reported where volunteers felt discriminated against as they had a disability.

== Media coverage and operations ==
It's estimated that approximately 3.9 billion people viewed the Sydney Paralympic Games, across 220 countries. Australian commercial television station Channel 7 paid $45 million for the rights to broadcast the games, however later declined to do so as it regarded the investment too high risk. Simon Thomas, the SPOC's senior television manager was quoted as saying:

"There were several fundamental issues [that] we never got very close to resolving [with Channel 7] and in the end it was a mutual agreement to go our separate ways."

Later, it was decided that Australian national broadcaster, ABC, would broadcast the games on ABC local radio and on ABC television. ABC had previous experience covering the Paralympics in 1992 and 1996. The television coverage included 40 hours of live action, with 2 hours per weekday and 20 hours on the grandstand program during both weekends. Over a total of 17 days, there were more than 8 million Metropolitan viewers and almost 4 million Regional viewers. The opening and closing ceremonies placed in the top 20 ABC most popular programs for the season. The ABC sports also set up an interactive website, with quizzes, athlete profiles and results.

The relationship between the SOCOG and the SPOC resulted in providing improved media coverage for both the Olympics and Paralympics. Media operations were planned to limit the potential for complaint by both local Australian and overseas media, to result in better Paralympic Games reviews. This approach by Australian media was taken in response to the previous limitations of the Atlanta Paralympics. Australia was heavily involved in the media coverage of the Paralympics, namely through the role of volunteers.

The table below outlines the staffing numbers of the Media Centre at the Olympics and Paralympics respectively:

	Total Number	Peak Shift Number
Paid	114 Olympics 70 Paralympics	114 Olympics 70 Paralympics
Volunteer	1113 Olympics 253 Paralympics	340 Olympics 80 Paralympics
Contractor	1078 Olympics 223 Paralympics	490 Olympics 70 Paralympics

The Main Media Centre (MMC) for the Paralympics opened on 11 October, and from 18–29 October ran 24 hours a day. Coupled with the MMC was a research and information office, including a library run by Wayne Peak, the SOCOG Communications officer. Staff from the Centre for Olympic Studies at the University of New South Wales also assisted the running of the library. WeMedia provided internet coverage of the games, and was a sponsor and partner of the Sydney Paralympics. During the games, WeMedia had 300 staff operating in the MMC. Creative production of the WeMedia webcast was led by Jason Snyder. The official broadcaster of the games ABC, had a comparatively smaller team of 30 for its television coverage.

== Australian Paralympic Movement ==
The 2000 Paralympic Games proved to be a unique catalyst for social change within Australia and enabled the APC to realize its true potential and capacity to be a leader in the international arena of Paralympic sport.

— Paul Bird, Chef de Mission

Through increased media coverage and community support, the Australian athletes who participated at the 2000 Summer Paralympic games have left a lasting impression. Future Paralympians and the APC are left with the gift of a legacy from these athletes. Information into the attitude towards the Paralympics was sought through the APC in conjunction with Woolcott Research over a two-year period. The statistics are listed below:

- 93% of Australians believe Paralympic athletes are elite and train as hard as able-bodied athletes
- 87% of Australians believe they should receive equal or more funding than Olympic athletes
- 71% of Australians want to know personal stories about the athletes
- 72% of Australians believe that Paralympic athletes do not receive the attention deserved to them

The success of the Australian Paralympic team during the 2000 Summer games paves the way for a strong argument related to increased funding, education and infrastructure. After the 2000 games, 54 Australian athletes were later awarded part-time scholarships to attend the Australian Institute of Sport. The value of these scholarships was approximately $1000 and recognised the value of Paralympic sport.

Following the Games, the Australian Paralympic Committee (APC) became the legacy recipient of the nation with respect to recognition, funding, sport organisation and capacity development. Attaining this title and the consequent recognition, further resulted in "government funding with a 150% increase" for up to seven years after the Games. This facilitated the mainstreaming of certain aspects of the Paralympic sporting bodies, which were described to have "gained benefits" through better "training, coaching and professional sport organisations". On the other hand, due to competing interests involving individuals without disabilities, the mainstreaming after-effects were also described to be placing a "lower priority for resources" amongst the disabled sporting community. In general, the increased recognition provided an opportunity to target diverse demographics amongst coaches, teachers, students and the public, by "delivering disability education programmes" to approximately 39,000 individuals.

In 2009, the Australian Paralympics Committee (APC) established the Australian Centre for Paralympic Studies (ACPS) as an initiative to preserve and protect the "historic, sporting and business information" that was acquired through the Paralympic Movement. After its formation, the APC collaborated with the National Library of Australia (NLA) via a formal agreement for the "Paralympic oral history project", to capture and promote the preservation of Australian "history and sporting culture". In general, this collaboration occurred in September 2010, to "mark the 50th anniversary of the Paralympic Games", and the project involved conducting interviews of athletes who participated in the first Games in 1960. This led to the recording of "66 interviews" which initially focused on the first Paralympians. Some of these interviews featured individuals who were described to have played "key roles" in the Australian Paralympic movement’s development. This included Anne Green, who was a Paralympics swimming coach and administrator, and the captain of his team at the 1968 Games, Dr. John Yeo. With time, this was followed by the project shifting in direction and expanding its focus to involve other athletes as well. However, this attempt has been subjected to criticism by members of the Australian Paralympic Oral History Project, as they hold the view that it is essential for the APC to include "narratives from actual participants", instead of focusing on "proxy or interpretive accounts" from those who are not part of the disabled community.

Twenty years after Australia’s 2000 Paralympic Games, the winning participants reflected on their past and present experiences, describing the event’s impact as one that has strongly shifted "Australia’s perception of disabilities". Former wheelchair racer, Louise Sauvage current focus centres around training, guiding and assisting other Paralympians to "achieve their goals" to contribute to the future of this movement. Tim Matthews, a former relay team member claimed that "there was no doubt the Sydney event was a watershed moment for the disability movement" which extends to the global community. As Tim believes that the disabled community has a "voice and a lot more exposure" today, his priorities centre around "giving back" by training and supporting members of Paralympics Australia, as well as working as a talent spotter for the organisation.

In addition, the Games were utilised as a platform to showcase the culture of Indigenous Australian peoples to participants and audiences from different nations. The culture of the Aboriginal and Torres Strait Islander peoples was described to be "rich", and the SOCOG worked in close collaboration with their communities to display their culture on a global scale, with the attempt to be inclusive in their approach. The SOCOG also worked towards actively engaging Indigenous communities during the Games, to provide them with commercial, promotional, employment, ceremonies and cultural design opportunities. This was actioned by its establishment of a National Indigenous Advisory Committee, which was delegated the responsibility to monitor and review the "cultural content, themes, materials and protocol" with respect to the events. These events ranged from Olympics ceremonies, the Volunteers program, Olympics Arts Festivals, "traditional welcoming ceremonies" to the Olympic Youth Camp. In particular, the Torch Relay was described to have paid a tribute to "many significant" and sacred Indigenous sites. The Relay event both commenced and concluded with the recognition of Aboriginal athletes Nova Peris-Kneebone and Cathy Freeman, respectively. Additionally, in the opening ceremony of the Paralympic Games, the torch was carried by an Indigenous athlete and wheelchair basketball player named Kevin Coombs. Coombs had participated in the first Paralympic Games held in Rome in 1960 and was also assigned the role of serving as team captain during the 1980 Games.

== Honouring the athletes ==
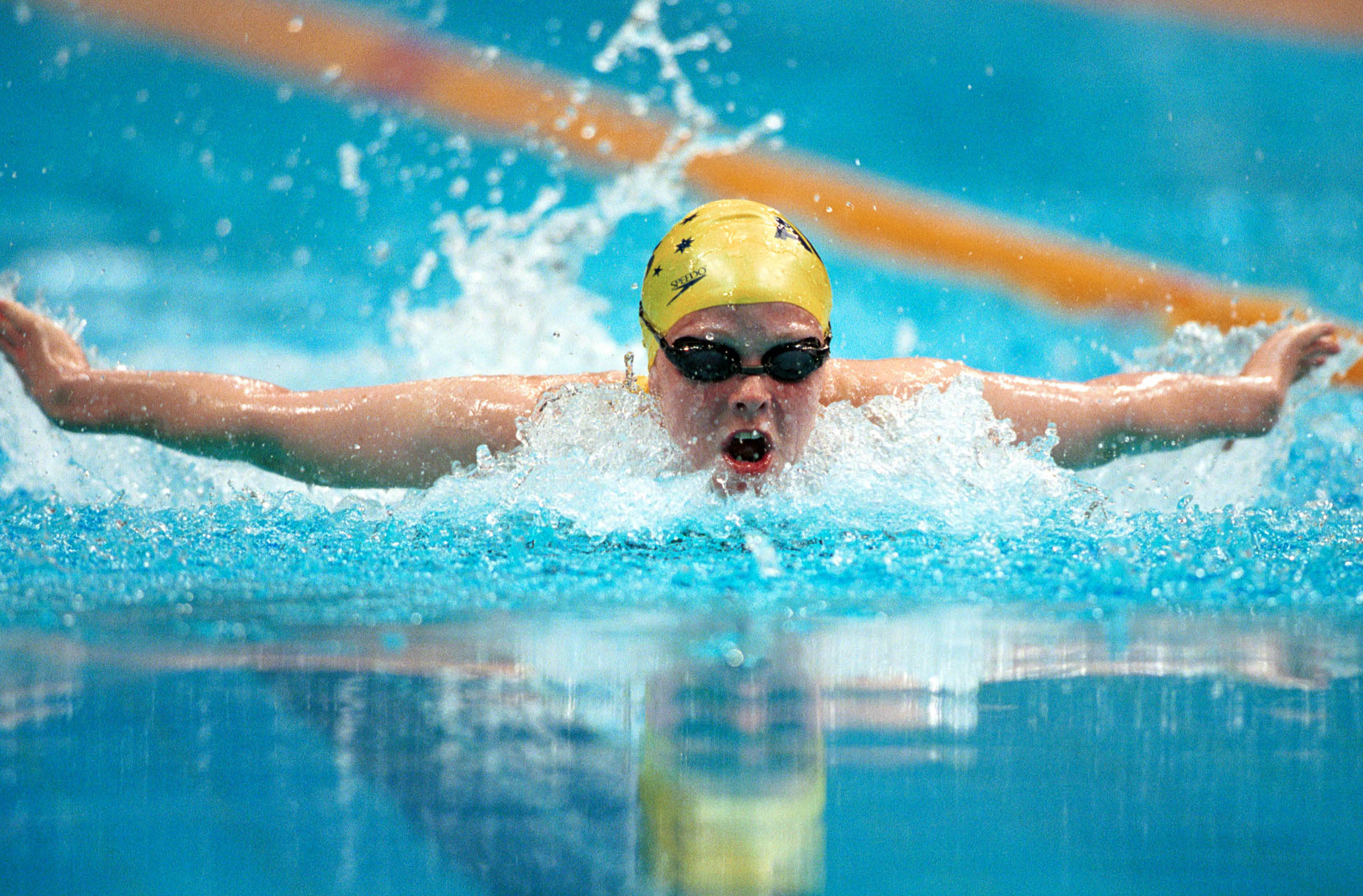
221000 - Swimming Siobhan Paton action 2 - 3b - 2000 Sydney event photo

On 31 October, Australia Post began releasing stamps honouring a number of successful Paralympic athletes from the games. Featured on a 45c stamp was Siobhan Paton as the "Paralympian of the Year".

Senator Lundy, on behalf of the Australian Labor Party, congratulated the athletes as well as coaches and supporting staff. She acknowledged the important dedication the athletes showed in making the games 'the best ever'.

"Most of all I would like to acknowledge all of those athletes who went out there to strive for their personal best and achieved it. Not every sport records the personal best outcomes, but I know that an incredible number of athletes in their endeavours over the last two weeks did achieve their personal best and will hold that memory in their hearts forever."
Kate Lundy, Senator.

== Athlete testimonials ==
Louise Sauvage later wrote of the 2000 Summer Paralympics and said:

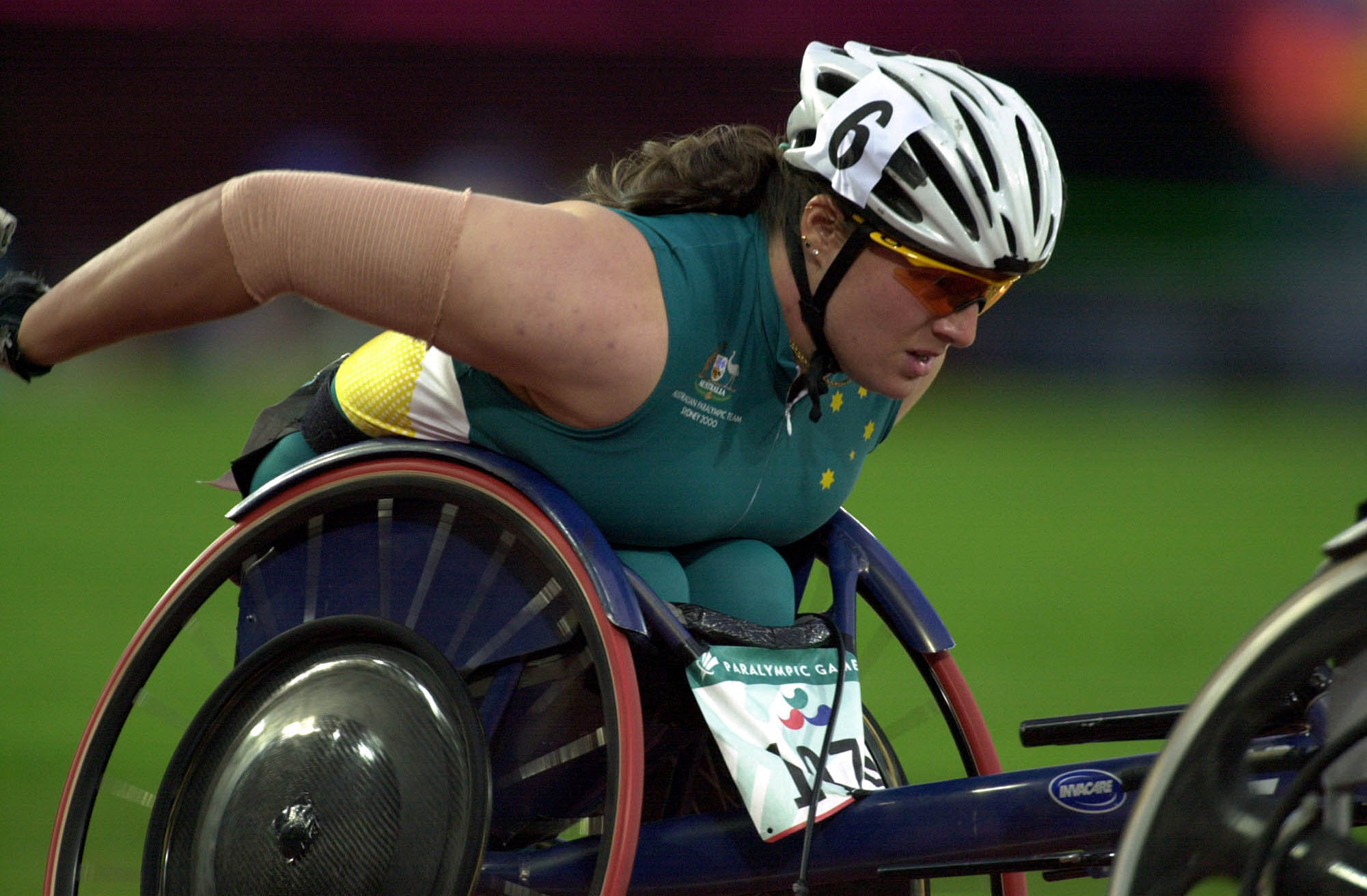
231000 - Athletics wheelchair racing 800m T54 final Louise Sauvage silver action 2 - 3b - 2000 Sydney race photo

"Never in my years as a wheelchair racer had I experienced anything like the tremendous blast of noise and energy that swept me home to an Olympic gold medal that Sydney evening - Thursday 28 September 2000. And I probably never will again. After more races than I can begin to remember, this was a once-in-a-lifetime event. I learned that night that a crowd of 110,000 in a great stadium can muster an amazing physicality when it is willing someone to win. Making my challenge with 150 metres to go, out in Lane Three on the brick-red Stadium Australia track, I felt as if I were almost picked up and carried along by the roar of the crowd, the breath of the crowd. They propelled me to the line … to the gold. Only later was I told of how many people had risen to their feet almost as one, clambering on seats, to add their determination to my own in that 800 metres final. I will never forget the feeling that night, the 'rush' that supported my charge in the home straight. It is not easy to put into words"

Kurt Fearnley looked back at his success during his debut games:

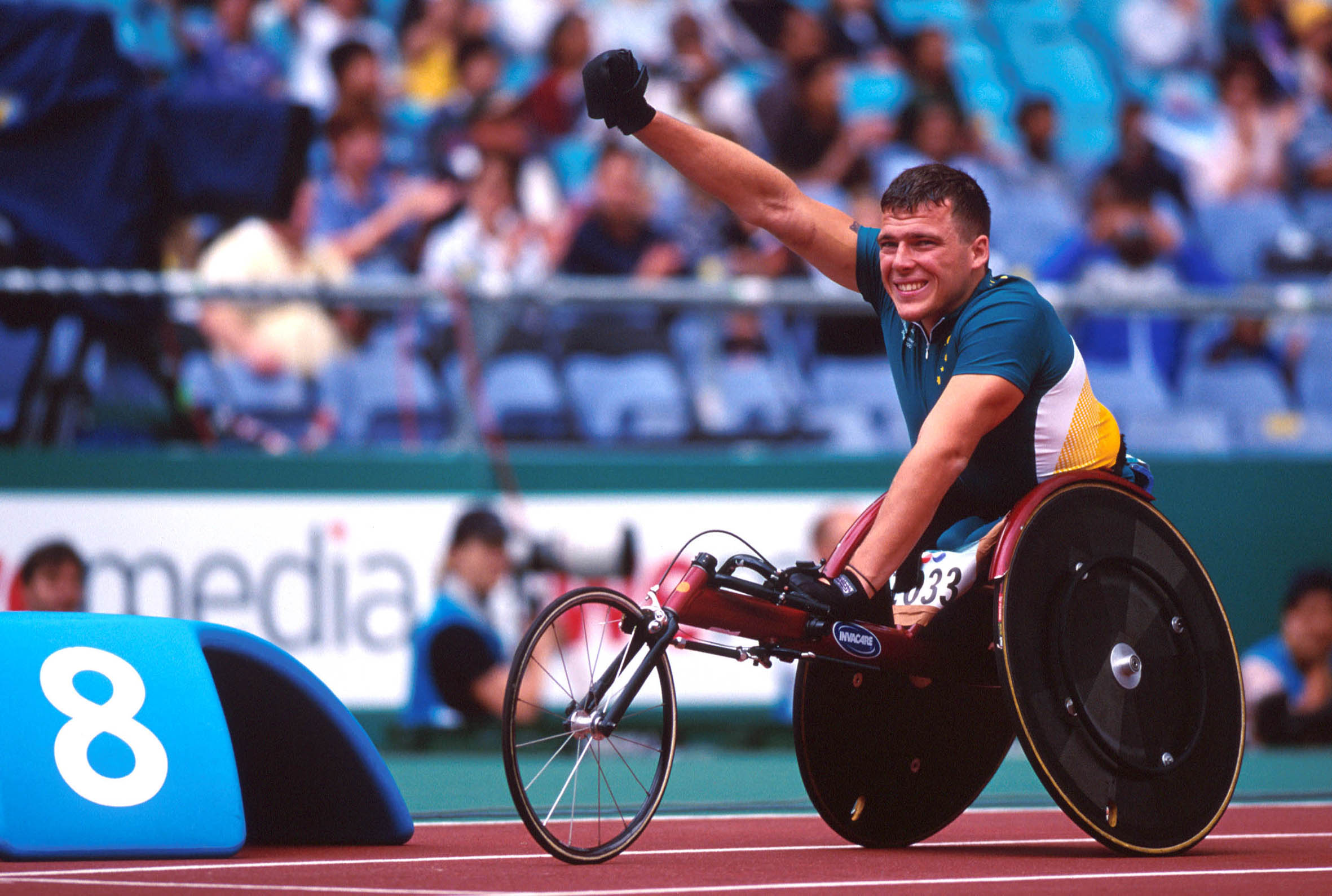
301000 - Athletics wheelchair racing Kurt Fearnely waves - 3b - 2000 Sydney race photo

"I debuted in the 2000 Sydney Paralympics, in front of family, friends and just about every person who had carried me to the start line. But the support within the Australian Paralympic team was the real game changer for me. The current Australian Paralympic legends opened up their homes to me, gave me much-needed equipment and helped me understand the significance of what it is that we do. We look after each other. We are responsible for leaving the sport stronger than when we started. We are not strong despite our disability, we are strong because of it. We are proud men and women with disability, who choose to test our levels of functionality to the extreme."

== Games outcomes ==
By nature, and based on "conventional wisdom", the Paralympic Games provided a platform for Sydney’s disabled community to be granted the opportunity for a "lasting legacy" of an increased degree of disability awareness and the development of accessible infrastructure, which would ultimately improve the demographic’s socioeconomic status. To achieve such outcomes, the OCA was delegated the role of "developing a sustainable long-term plan" in relation to design, construction and the overall operation of the venues. This was in response to the limited accessibility issue faced by the disabled community. Roles including the distribution of event information, ticketing and entire operation of the Games were conducted by the Sydney Organising Committee for the Olympic Games (SOCOG) and Sydney Paralympic Organising Committee (SPOC).

Overall, the OCA undertook its responsibility by developing Access Guidelines, forming a body known as the Olympic Access Advisory Committee to specifically devise plans for disability and access issues, tailor-making an access guide for the Games and providing a critical written reflection on the event’s access operations. As majority of the sporting events occurred at Sydney Olympic Park, the delivery of these enhancements for the disabled community was described as an "example of world best practice", and the venue has been regarded as the "premier access precinct in Australia".

For example, prior to the Games, Sydney’s public transport system was not accessible to the disabled population, as "0% of public and private buses were accessible" and "less than 5% of rail stations accessible". The Olympic Roads and Transport Authority (ORTA) was formed to plan, enable and maintain coordination between OCA, SOCOG and transport authorities. In response to the gap in accessing the public transport system, the ORTA was required to fulfil its role, however, minimal work was "undertaken to improve the access situation" in preparation for the Games.

After the games, the Paralympic mascot 'Lizzie' was made available for the Australian public to purchase through Franklin stores. The Australian Paralympic Committee successfully claimed the rights to the mascot following the breakup of the SPOC. The APC saw value in the continuation and retention of the mascot in the community.

Prime Minister at the time John Howard announced increased government funding for Paralympic sport in the future. On 23 October 2000, the Sydney Morning Herald reported that Howard had committed to proving the Paralympians the same percentage increase as the Olympians.

== Involvement of the NSW Government ==
The Olympic Co-ordination Authority (OCA) holds the view that measuring the "success" of the Games is not confined to the "performance of Games venues and events", but also entails the "festive atmosphere, access, ease of movement, security and urban amenity" which shape the overall experience of tourists, local residents and participants. To fund and regulate the entire experience, the NSW government established bodies such as OCA, SPOC and SOCOG. Although SPOC and SOCOG are independent and unique entities, they are similar in function and complement one another. Due to this, "economies of scale" and operational efficiencies have been accomplished by collaboration between "operational methods and personnel". The NSW Government’s involvement in conducting sporting events and providing public services was fully coordinated by the OCA. Additionally, the OCA was responsible for managing the "Government’s relationship" with the other actively involved organisations, SPOC and SOCOG, as well as providing the NSW Government with ongoing reports about the expenditures. The Government also created and funded other organisations to cater for all aspects of the Games such as health, water management, transport and security. For example, the purpose of the Olympic Security Command Centre (OSCC) was to assign a "security and intelligence team" from NSW Police with the responsibility of meeting security requirements through organisation, preparation and management.

== See also ==
- 2000 Summer Paralympics
- Australia at the 2000 Summer Olympics
- Images of the Australian Team at the 2000 Summer Paralympics
