= Nicholas Maroney =

Australian Paralympian

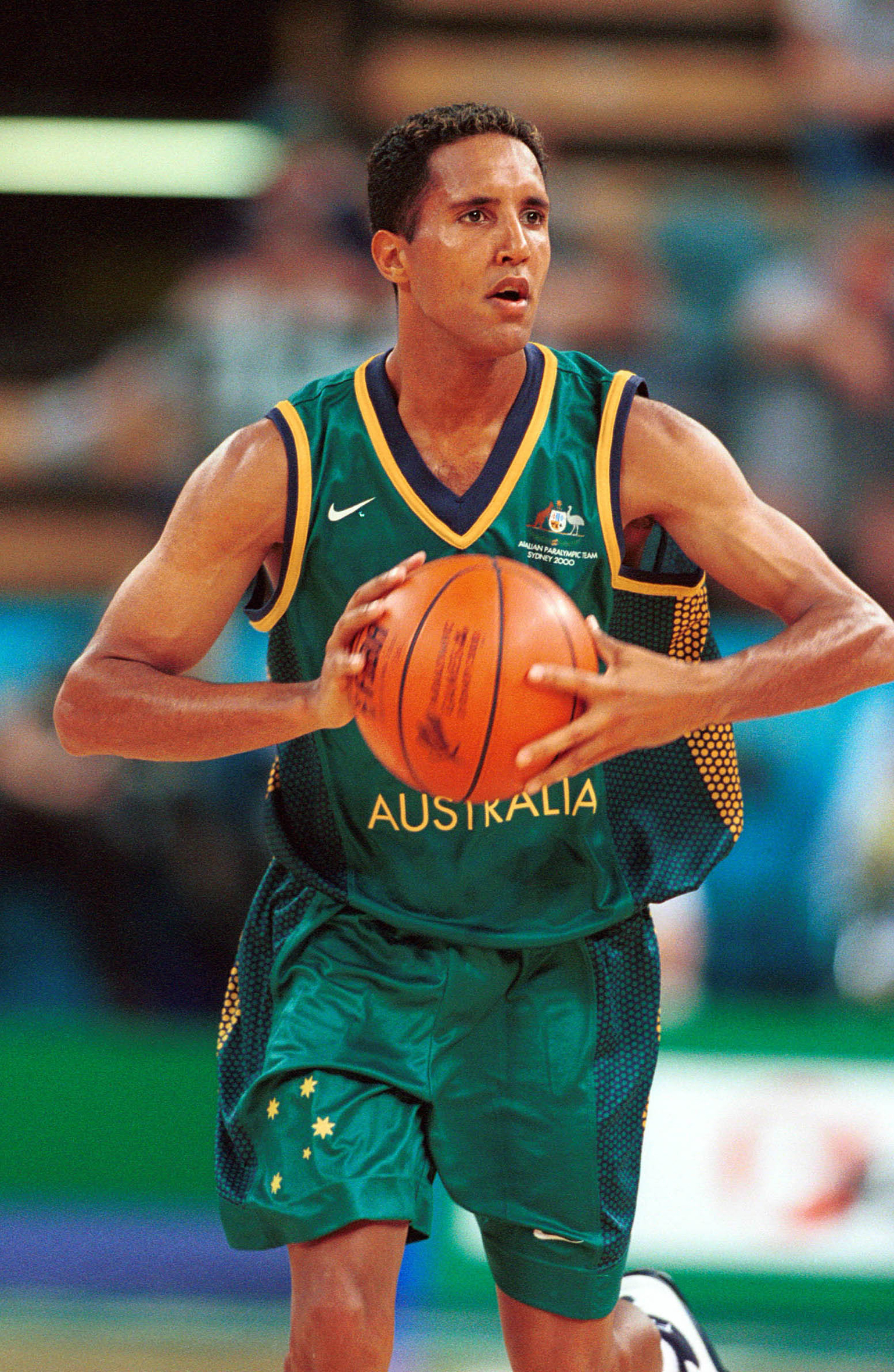
- Maroney with the ball during competition at the 2000 Summer Paralympics

Sport
- Country: Australia
- Sport: intellectual disability basketball

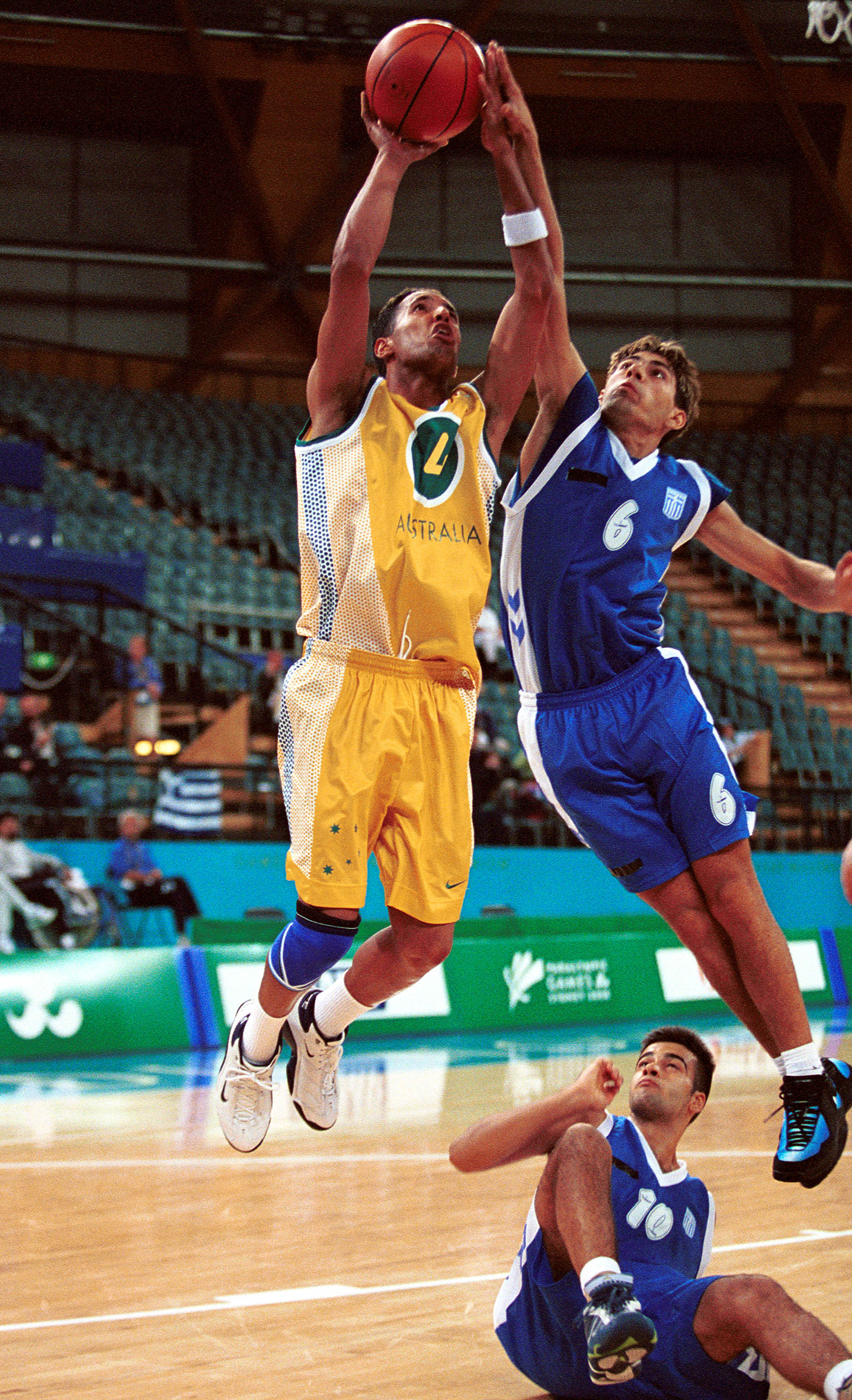
Maroney (left) shoots the ball during competition at the 2000 Summer Paralympics

Nicholas Robin Maroney (born 12 December 1978) is an Australian Paralympian who competed in intellectual disability basketball at the 2000 Summer Paralympics. The International Paralympic Committee identified him as one of the top ten players in the world in the lead up to the 2000 Games. The 2000 games are notable for this athlete because it was the first time this event had been competed for at the Paralympics.

== See also ==
- Australia at the 2000 Summer Paralympics

== Bibliography ==
- International Paralympic Committee (17 October 2000). "Intellectual Disability Basketball Preview". Sydney 2000 Paralympic Games Official Program. Sydney.
