= Lucy Williams =

Australian Paralympic swimmer

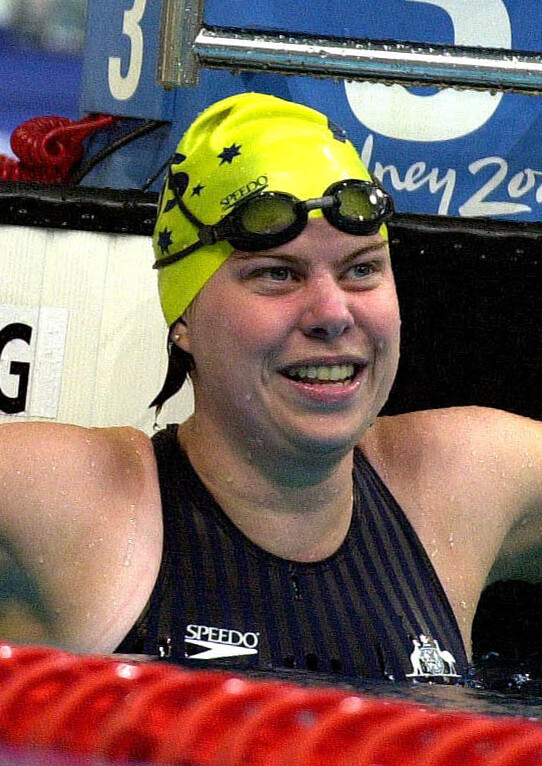
- Lucy Williams at the 2000 Summer Paralympics

Personal information
- Nationality: Australia
- Born: 6 April 1976 (age 50) Sydney, New South Wales
Medal record
Swimming
Paralympic Games
Bronze medal – third place	2000 Sydney	Women's 100 m Breaststroke SB6

Lucy Williams (born 6 April 1976) is a Paralympic swimming competitor from Australia. She was born in Sydney, New South Wales. She won a bronze medal at the 2000 Sydney Games in the Women's 100 m Breaststroke SB6 event.
