= Denise Beckwith =

Australian Paralympic swimmer

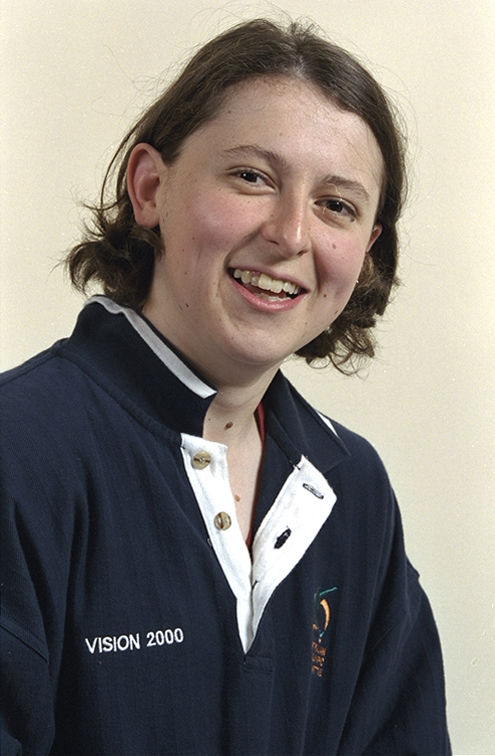
- 2000 Australian Paralympic team portrait of Beckwith

Personal information
- Nationality: Australia
- Born: 7 December 1977 (age 48) Sydney, New South Wales
Medal record
Swimming
Paralympic Games
| Bronze medal – third place | 2000 Sydney | Women's 4x50 m Freestyle 20 pts |
IPC Swimming World Championships
| Silver medal – second place | 1998 Christchurch | Women's 4 x 50 m Freestyle Open |
| Bronze medal – third place | 1998 Christchurch | Women's 200m Freestyle S4 |
| Bronze medal – third place | 1998 Christchurch | Women's 4 x 50 m Medley Open |

Denise Beckwith (born 7 December 1977) is a Paralympic swimming competitor from Australia. She was born in Sydney, New South Wales. She won a bronze medal at the 2000 Sydney Games in the Women's 4x50 m Freestyle 20 pts event.
