= Kate Church =

Australian Paralympic swimmer

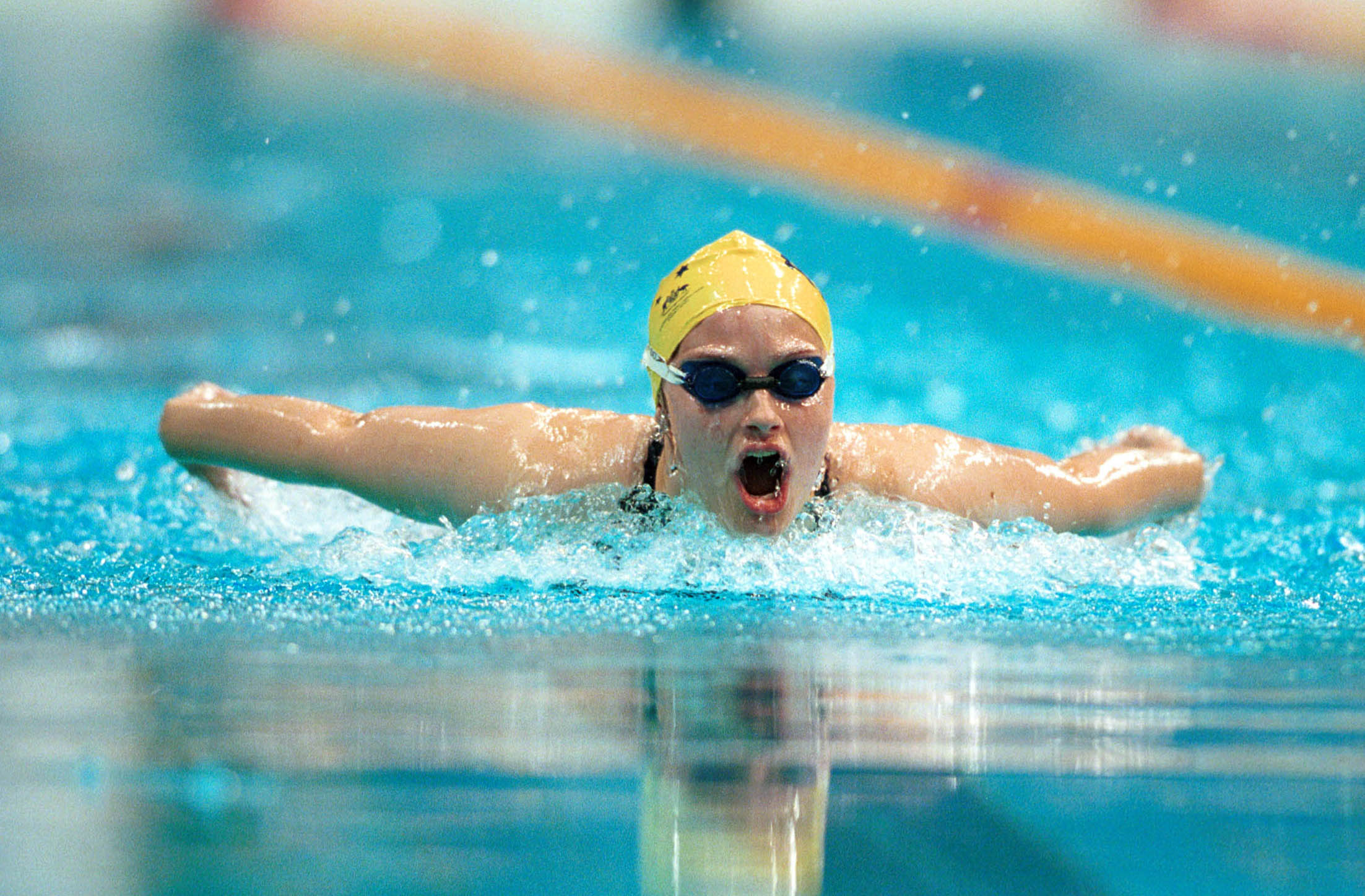
- Action shot of Church in the pool during competition at the 2000 Summer Paralympics

Personal information
- Nickname: Churchy
- Nationality: Australia
- Born: 27 March 1978 (age 47) Ballarat

Sport
- Club: Shepparton Amateur Swimming Club

Kate Church (born 27 March 1978) is an Australian Paralympian from Victoria who competed in swimming at the 2000 Summer Paralympic Games.

== Australian Longcourse Swimming Records ==
- SB8 Open Women's 50m Breastroke, set 26 March 1999
