= Melissa Willson =

Paralympic swimming athlete

Personal information
- Nationality: Australia
- Born: 6 September 1980 (age 45) Sydney, New South Wales
- Height: 5'2 (157cm)
- Weight: 57 kg (126 lb)
Medal record
Swimming
Paralympic Games
Bronze medal – third place	2000 Sydney	Women's 4x50 m Freestyle 20 pts
IPC Swimming World Championships
Silver medal – second place	1998 Christchurch	Women's 50 m Backstroke S4
Silver medal – second place	1998 Christchurch	Women's 4 x 50 m Freestyle Open
Bronze medal – third place	1998 Christchurch	Women's 150 m Medley SM4
Bronze medal – third place	1998 Christchurch	Women's 50 m Butterfly S4
Bronze medal – third place	1998 Christchurch	Women's 50 m Freestyle S4
Bronze medal – third place	1998 Christchurch	Women's 100 m Freestyle S4
Bronze medal – third place	1998 Christchurch	Women's 4 x 50 m Medley Open

Melissa Willson (born 6 September 1980) is a Paralympic swimming athlete who competed for Australia in the 2000 Paralympics. She was born on 6 September 1980 in Sydney, New South Wales . She swam for the Gosford Amateur Swimming Club. She competed in 5 individual events also in 2 relays. Melissa made all of the— finals at the 2000 Paralympics. She won a bronze medal at the 2000 Sydney Games in the Women's 4x50 m Freestyle 20 pts event. She was trained under Peter Baldwin, who trains at Mingara Aquatic Centre.
