= Australian Paralympic Swim Team =

The Australian Paralympic Swim Team has competed at every Summer Paralympics, which started with the 1960 Summer Paralympic Games.

Matthew Cowdrey at the 2012 London Games replaced Priya Cooper as Australia's most successful Paralympic swimmer, with a tally of 13 gold medals over three Paralympic Games (2004, 2008 and 2012). Cowdrey replaced Kingsley Bugarin for the record for holding the most number of medals in any sport, with 23 medals from 3 Paralympic Games (2004–2012). Jacqueline Freney won 8 gold medals at the 2012 London Games replacing Siobhan Paton as Australia's most successful Paralympic competitor at a single games.

== Leading Australian swimmers, 1960–2024 ==
Athlete	Gold	Silver	Bronze	Total
Matthew Cowdrey	13	7	3	23
Priya Cooper	9	3	4	16
Jacqueline Freney	8	0	3	11
Ellie Cole	6	5	6	17
Tracey Freeman	6	4	0	10
Siobhan Paton	6	0	0	6
Kingsley Bugarin	5	8	6	19
Totals (7 entries)	53	27	22	102

== Australian Medal Tally 1960–2020 ==
Games	Gold	Silver	Bronze	Total
1960 Rome	2	0	0	2
1964 Tokyo	9	2	2	13
1968 Tel-Aviv	5	5	1	11
1972 Heidelberg	1	3	5	9
1976 Toronto	3	5	2	10
1980 Arnhem	1	8	2	11
1984 Stoke Mandeville	20	30	24	74
1988 Seoul	5	12	14	31
1992 Barcelona	10	12	13	35
1996 Atlanta	16	16	12	44
2000 Sydney*	14	15	21	50
2004 Athens	6	14	15	35
2008 Beijing	9	11	9	29
2012 London	18	7	12	37
2016 Rio	9	10	10	29
2020 Tokyo	8	10	15	33
2024 Paris	6	8	13	27
Totals (17 entries)	142	168	170	480

=== 1960 Summer Paralympics ===
Daphne Ceeney was Australia's first Paralympic Swim Team member. At the 1960 Summer Paralympics, Ceeney won gold in the Women's 50m Breaststroke and gold in the Women's 50m Crawl in the "complete class 5". At the same games, she also competed in the Archery and Athletics.

==== Swimmers ====
- Women: Daphne Ceeney

==== Medal tally ====
The Australian Paralympic Swim team finished ninth on the medal table with a total of 2 medals.

- Gold Medals: 2

=== 1964 Summer Paralympics ===
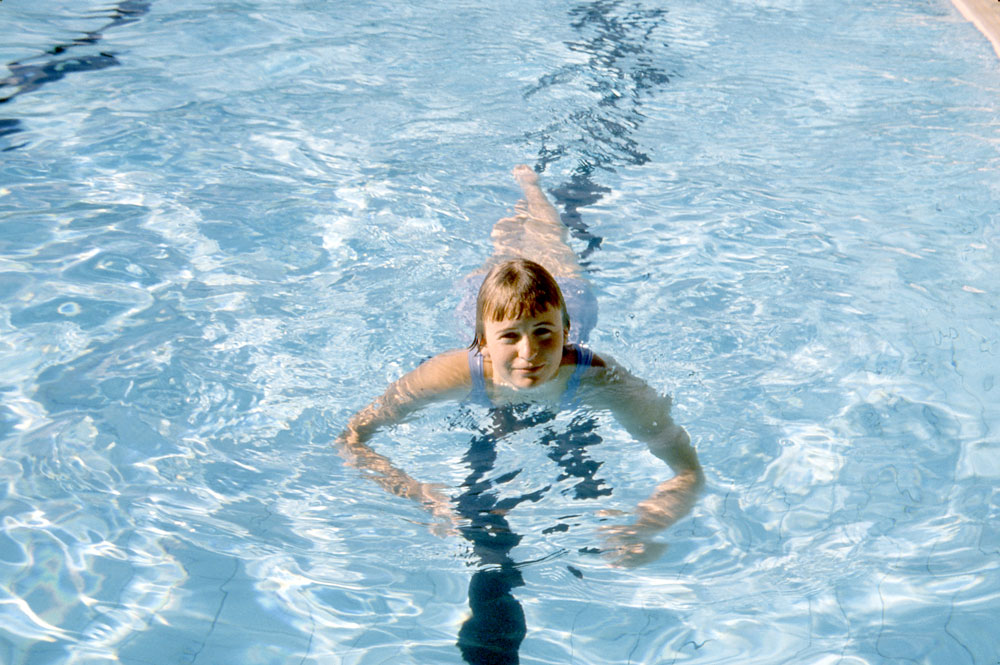
Elizabeth Edmondson

==== Medallists ====
- Men: Michael Dow, Roy Fowler, Trevor French, Gary Hooper, Allan McLucas, Frank Ponta, Bruce Thwaite
- Women: Elizabeth Edmondson, Daphne Ceeney

==== Medal tally ====
The Australian Paralympic Swim Team finished second on the medal table with a total of 13 medals at the 1964 Summer Paralympics.

- Gold Medals: 9
- Silver Medals: 2
- Bronze Medals: 2

=== 1968 Summer Paralympics ===
==== Team members ====
- Men – Felix Blums, Brian Chambers, Gary Hooper, Bill Mather-Brown, Allan McLucas, Frank Ponta, Jeff Simmonds, Don Watts
- Women – Lorraine Dodd, Elizabeth Edmondson, Daphne Hilton, Sally Lamb, Cherrie Ireland,

==== Medal tally ====
The Australian Swim Team won a total of 11 Medals at the 1968 Summer Paralympics finishing 6th in the Medal Standings.

- Gold Medals: 5
- Silver Medals: 5
- Bronze Medals: 1

=== 1972 Summer Paralympics ===
==== Team members ====
Men – Eric Boulter, Brian Chambers, Russell Morrison
Women – Pauline English, Pam Foley, Cherrie Ireland, Elizabeth Richards

==== Medal tally ====
The Australian Swim Team finished 10th place in the Medal standings at the 1972 Summer Paralympics with 9 medals:

- Gold Medals: 1
- Silver Medals: 3
- Bronze Medals: 5

=== 1976 Summer Paralympics ===
==== Team members ====
Men – Robert Faulkner, G. Green, John Hind, Roy Kubig, Brian Sullivan
Women – Pauline English, Lyn Michael, Gail Nicholson

==== Medal tally ====
The Australian Swim Team finished in 12th place on the medal tally at the 1976 Summer Paralympics with 10 Medals:

- Gold Medals: 3
- Silver Medals: 5
- Bronze Medals: 2

=== 1980 Summer Paralympics ===
==== Team members ====
Men - Rene Andres, Paul Bird, Peter Carroll, Gary Gudgeon, Peter Hill, Dennis Kennedy, David (Dave) Manera, David McPherson, Charlie Tapscott
Women – Carolyn Connors, Maureen Pybus

==== Medal tally ====
The Australian Paralympic Swim team finished in 15th place on the medal tally at the 1980 Summer Paralympics with a total of 11 Medals:

- Gold Medals: 1
- Silver Medals: 8
- Bronze Medals: 2

=== 1984 Summer Paralympics ===
The 1984 Summer Paralympics were Australia's most successful medal haul with a final tally of 74 medals.

==== Team members ====
Men – Paul Bird, Craig Blackburn, Kingsley Bugarin, Malcom Chalmers, Geoffrey Fowler, David Griffin, Gary Gudgeon, Greg Hammond, Michael Kelly, Alan Morley, Michael Quinn, Wayne Ryding, Robert Staddon, Phillip Tracey, Robert Walden
Women – Helena Brunner, Lynette Coleman, Kerri-Anne Connor, Anne Currie, Therese Donovan, Rosemary Eames, Kerrie Engel, Meredith Evans, Deborah Holland, Ursula King, Tracey Lewis, Jan Miller, Mary-Anne Wallace, Carol Young
Coaches - G. Brown (Blind) Officials - J. Blackburn (Manager – Blind)

==== Medal tally ====
The Australian Paralympic Swim team finished in 9th position in the medal standings at the 1984 Summer Paralympics with a total of 74 medals:

- Gold Medals: 20
- Silver Medals: 30
- Bronze Medals: 24

=== 1988 Summer Paralympics ===
==== Team members ====
- Men - Leslie Beath, Kingsley Bugarin, Brendan Burkett, Jason Diederich, Richard Dougan, Stephen Gregson, David Griffin, Greg Hammond, Simon Matthew Lee, David Lillecrapp, Brian Moores, Robert Philpot, Wayne Ryding, Ralph Smith, Gregory Timmermans, Phillip Tracey, Robert Walden
- Women - Karen Ferguson, Deborah Holland, Catherine Huggett, Susan Knox, Lyn Lillecrapp, Mandy Maywood, Sandra Yaxley, Judith Young

==== Medal tally ====
The Australian Paralympic Swim team finished in 14th position in the medal standings at the 1988 Summer Paralympics with a total of 31 medals:

- Gold Medals: 5
- Silver Medals: 12
- Bronze Medals: 14

=== 1992 Barcelona Paralympics ===
==== Team members ====
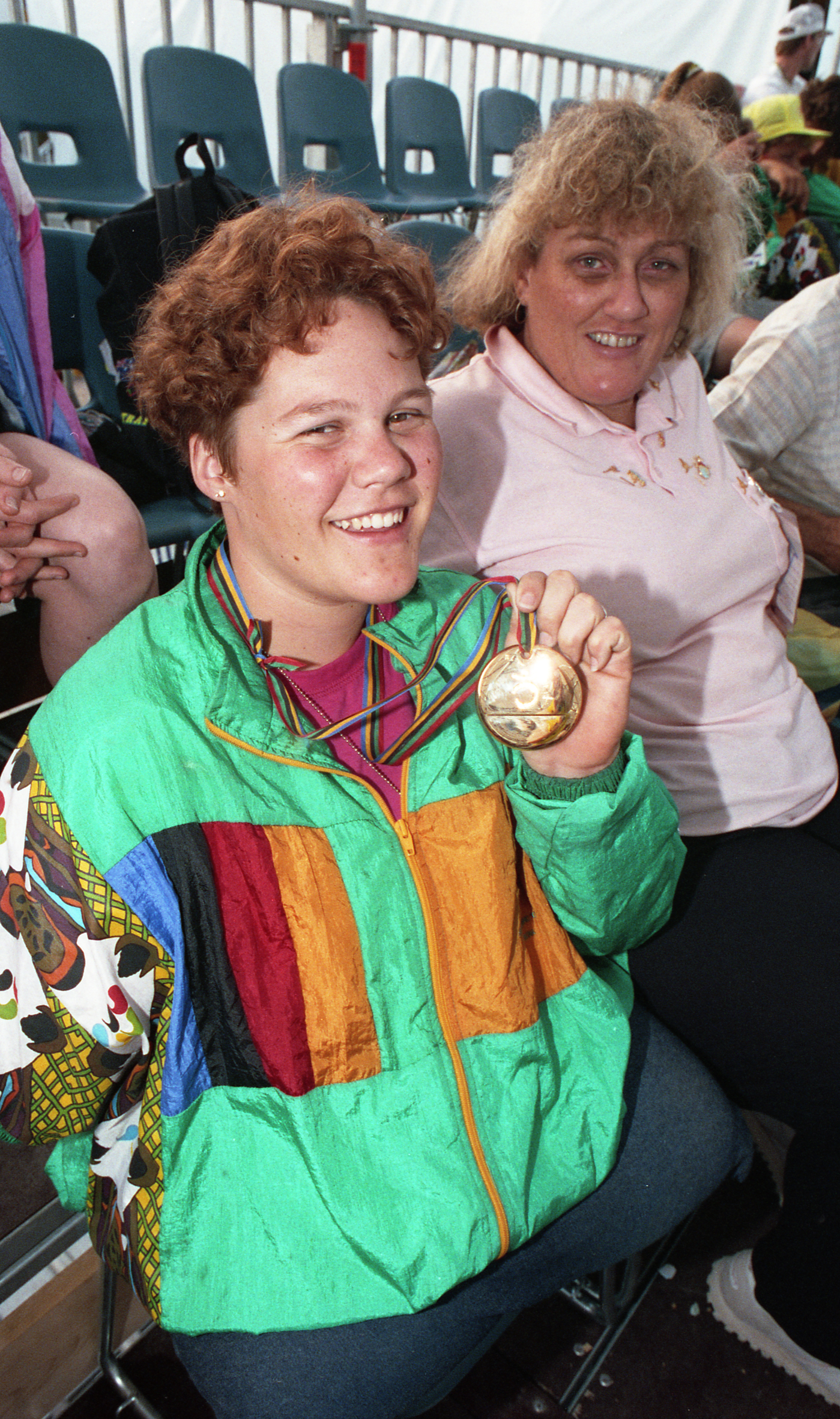
Tracy Lee Barrell holding Barcelona 1992 Paralympic medal

- Men – Rodney Bonsack, Damien Bridger, Kingsley Bugarin, Brendan Burkett (swim captain), Jason Diederich, Bradley Evans, Paul Gockel, Simon Matthew Lee, Kieran Modra, Stephen Simmonds, David Smith, Phillip Tracey
- Women – Kelly Barnes, Julie Barr, Tracy Barrell, Michelle Bate, Priya Cooper, Tracey Cross, Anne Currie, Catherine Huggett, Lyn Lillecrapp, Mandy Maywood, Tracey Oliver, Kirstyn Summerton, Danae Sweetapple, Sandra Yaxley, Judith Young

Coaches – Anne Green (Amputee), Phil Jose (Cerebral palsy), Kerry Smith (Cerebral palsy)
Officials – Ian McDowell-Jones (Vision impaired Manager), Rowenna Toppenberg (blind escort)

==== Medal tally ====
The Australian Swim team finished in sixth position in the medal standings at the 1992 Summer Paralympics with a total of 35 medals.

- Gold: 10
- Silver: 12
- Bronze: 13

=== 1996 Atlanta Paralympics ===
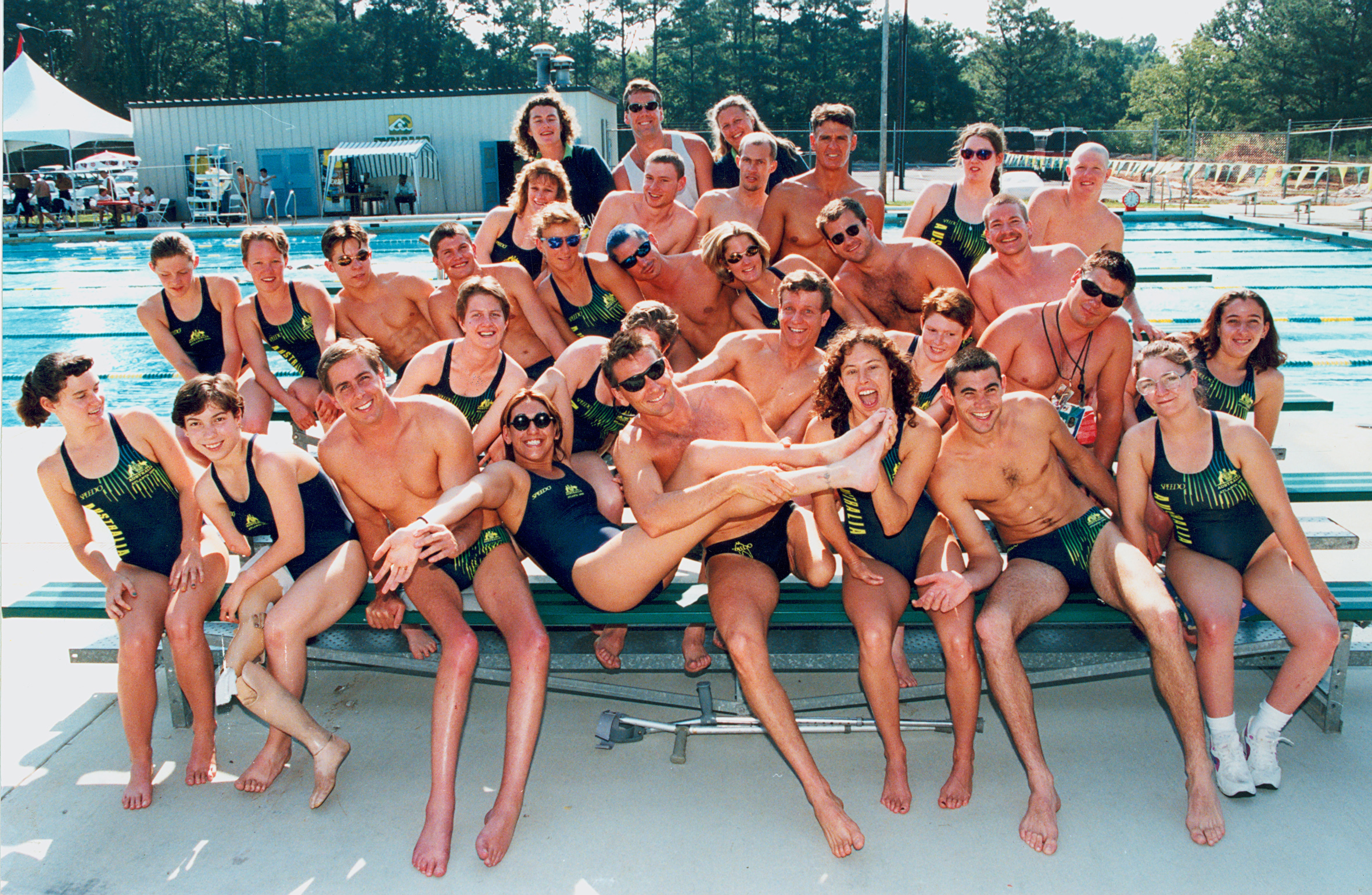
1996 Swimming Australian Team

==== Team members ====
- Men – Rodney Bonsack, Scott Brockenshire, Kingsley Bugarin, Brendan Burkett, Dominic Collins, Paul Cross, Cameron de Burgh, Grant Fitzpatrick, Paul Gockel, Alex Hadley, Jeff Hardy, Sean Harris, Brett Reid, Alastair Smales
- Women – Petrea Barker, Melissa Carlton, Priya Cooper, Tracey Cross, Gemma Dashwood, Janelle Falzon, Alicia Jenkins, Karni Liddell, Vicky Machen, Tamara Nowitzki, Tracey Oliver, Lesly Page, Sarah-Jane Schulze, Cara Sullivan, Elizabeth Wright, Judith Young
- Coaches – Ian Findlay (Head), Matthew Brown, Helen Cox, Kathryn Rogers.

==== Medal tally ====
The Australian Swim team finished in 3rd place in the Medal Standings at the 1996 Summer Paralympics with a total of 44 medals:

- Gold Medals: 16
- Silver Medals: 16
- Bronze Medals: 12

=== 2000 Sydney Paralympics ===
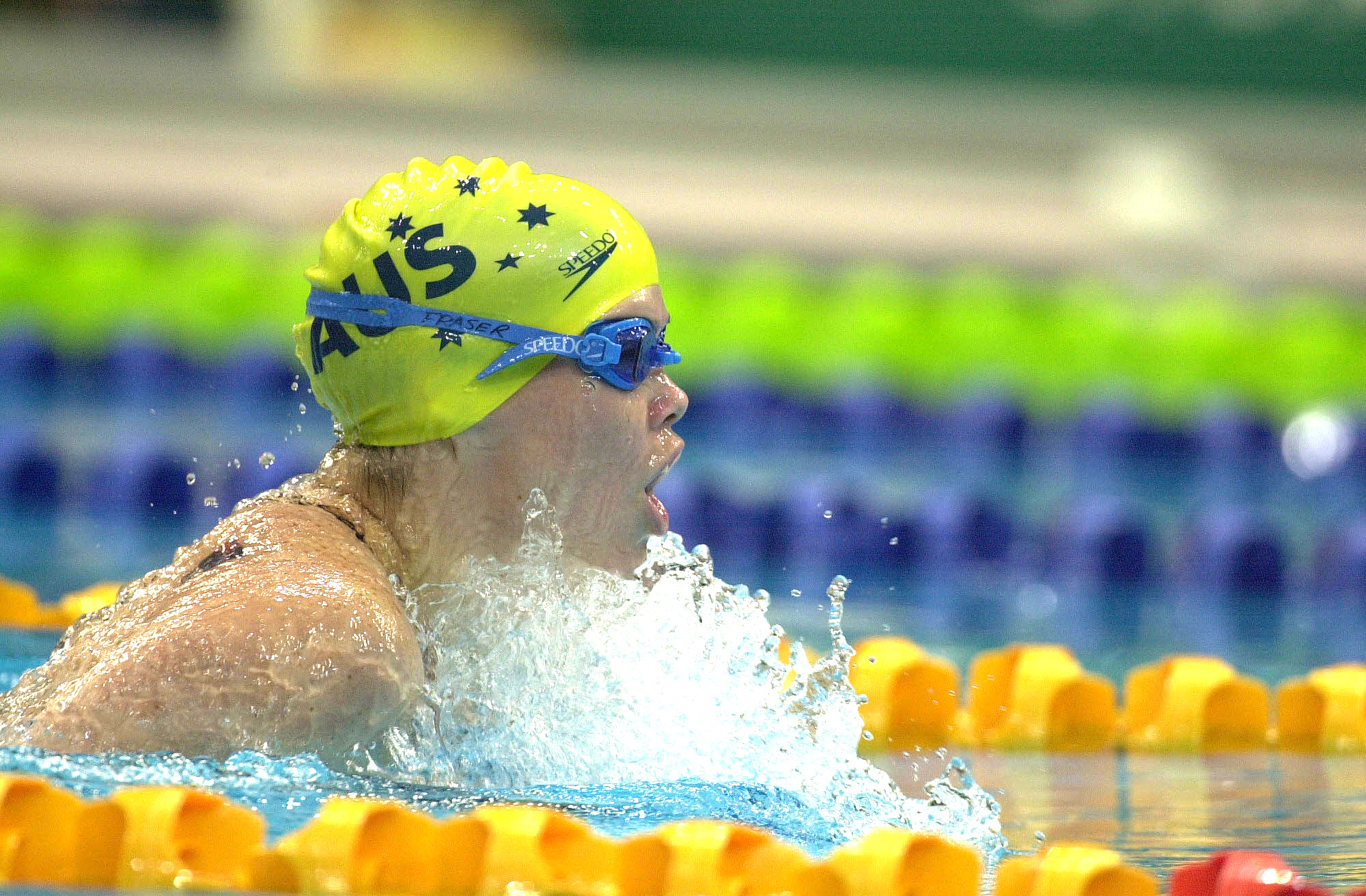
Amanda Fraser 200IM

A total of 51 swimmers were selected to compete in the Australian Swim Team at the 2000 Summer Paralympic Games.

==== Team members ====
- Team Captains: Priya Cooper, Brendan Burkett

Medallists:

- Men - Mark Altmann, Ben Austin, Paul Barnett, Daniel Bell, Tom Bridge, Scott Brockenshire, Kingsley Bugarin, Brendan Burkett, Dominic Collins, Paul Cross, Cameron de Burgh, Patrick Donachie, Justin Eveson, Jeff Hardy, Alex Harris, Michael Palfery, Stewart Pike, Brett Reid, David Rolfe, Alastair Smales, Christian Stafford, Shane Walsh
- Women - |Alicia Aberley, Katerina Bailey, Petrea Barker, Denise Beckwith, Melissa Carlton, Kate Church, Priya Cooper, Tracey Cross, Gemma Dashwood, Nicole Davey, Janelle Falzon, Amanda Fraser, Megan Grant, Judith Green, Sarah Houlbolt, Alicia Jenkins, Marayke Jonkers, Dianna Ley, Karni Liddell, Tamara Nowitzki, Kirra O'Cass, Siobhan Paton, Casey Redford, Ellen Steele, Brooke Stockham, Lucy Williams, Stacey Williams, Melissa Willson, Elizabeth Wright

==== Medal tally ====
The Australian Swim team finished 5th overall in the medal standings at the 2000 Summer Paralympics with 50 medals.

- Gold Medals: 14
- Silver Medals: 15
- Bronze Medals: 21

=== 2004 Athens Paralympics ===
A total of 29 swimmers were selected in the Australian Swim team to compete at the 2004 Summer Paralympics.

Matthew Cowdrey, in his first Paralympic Swim Team appearance, was Australia's best performing swimmer winning 3 gold, 2 silver and 2 bronze medals.

==== Team members ====
Swimmers::

- Men – Ben Austin, Daniel Bell, Sam Bramham, Matthew Cowdrey, Dale Grant, Alex Harris, Alex Hadley, Matt Levy, Jeremy McClure, Ricardo Moffatti, Rick Pendleton, Kobie Scott, Alastair Smales, Rod Welsh
- Women – Katerina Bailey, Sarah Bowen, Lichelle Clarke, Mandy Drennan, Marayke Jonkers, Kat Lewis, Hannah MacDougall, Katrina Porter, Sarah Rose, Dianne Saunders, Jessica Smith, Brooke Stockham, Prue Watt, Stacey Williams, Chantel Wolfenden

Head coach- Brendan Keogh Assistant coaches - John Beckworth, Peter Bishop, Graeme Carroll, Gwen Godfrey, Paul Simms Manager - Adam Luscombe Sports Scientist - Brendan Burkett Support staff - Ingrid McKay (Massage Therapist), Claire Nichols (Physiotherapist), Zoe Young (Assistant Team Manager)

==== Medal tally ====
The Australian Paralympic Swim team finished 10th overall with a total of 35 Medals.

- Gold Medals: 6
- Silver Medals: 14
- Bronze Medals: 15

Detailed Australian Results

=== 2008 Beijing Paralympics ===
A total of 35 swimmers were selected to compete in the Australian Swim team at the 2008 Summer Paralympics. This was the largest away team since the 1996 Summer Paralympics. Matthew Cowdrey (with 5 gold and 3 silver medals) and Peter Leek (with 3 gold, 4 silver and 1 bronze) were the most successful of the Australian swimmers.

Many of the swimmers were new to the Paralympic team: 8 of the 17 male athletes and 11 of the 18 female athletes were competing in their first Paralympic Team.

==== Team members ====
Swimmers:

- Team Captain: Matthew Cowdrey
- Men – Michael Anderson, Ben Austin, Daniel Bell, Sam Bramham, Blake Cochrane, Matthew Cowdrey, Jay Dohnt, Alex Hadley, Brenden Hall, Peter Leek, Matt Levy, Jeremy McClure, Ricardo Moffatti, Stephen Osborne, Andrew Pasterfield, Rick Pendleton, Jeremy Tidy
- Women – Sarah Bowen, Ellie Cole, Amanda Drennan, Jacqui Freney, Samantha Gandolfo, Marayke Jonkers, Katrina Lewis, Sian Lucas, Hannah MacDougall, Tarryn McGaw, Rhiannon Oliver, Esther Overton, Katrina Porter, Shelley Rogers, Sarah Rose, Teigan Van Roosmalen, Prue Watt, Annabelle Williams

Staff: Head coach- Brendan Keogh Assistant coaches - Graeme Carroll, Amanda Isaac, Jackie Black, Joanne Love, Rob Moon, Jon O'Neill-Shaw, Mel Tantrum, Section Manager - Melanie Jenkins Support staff- Brendan Burkett (Sport Scientist), Sacha Fulton (Sport Scientist), Claire Nichols (Physiotherapist), Vaughan Nicholson (Physiotherapist), Penny Will (Massage Therapist), Sandra Eccles (Nurse)

==== Medal tally ====
The Australian Paralympic Swim team finished 7th on the Medal Tally with a total of 29 medals.

- Gold Medals: 9
- Silver Medals: 11
- Bronze Medals: 9

Detailed Australian Results

=== Team members ===
Swimmers::

- Men: – Michael Anderson, Tim Antalfy, Michael Auprince, Blake Cochrane, Taylor Corry, Matthew Cowdrey, Jay Dohnt, Richard Eliason, Daniel Fox, Matthew Haanappel, Brenden Hall, Ahmed Kelly, Mitchell Kilduff, Matthew Levy, Jeremy McClure, Andrew Pasterfield, Grant Patterson, Rick Pendleton, Aaron Rhind, Sean Russo, Reagan Wickens
- Women: – Kayla Clarke, Ellie Cole, Katherine Downie, Maddison Elliott, Amanda Fowler, Jacqueline Freney, Tanya Huebner, Kara Leo, Esther Overton, Katrina Porter, Sarah Rose, Teigan Van Roosmalen, Prue Watt, Annabelle Williams

Head Coach – Brendan Keogh Section Manager – Karyn Burgess Assistant coach – Jonathan O'Neil-Shaw, coaches – Robert Hindmarsh, Tom Davies, Angelo Baselo, Michael Freney, Chris Phillips, Bash Zidan

- Sports Science – Brendan Burkett, Sacha Fulton
- Physiotherapy – Jo Anne Evershed, David Spurrier, Penny Will
- Sports Psychology – Jason Patchell
- Carer – Tara Andrews

==== Medal tally ====
Australia finished second on the gold medal table and won a total of 37 medals.

- Gold: 18
- Silver: 7
- Bronze: 12

Leading swimmers were – Jacqueline Freney won 8 gold medals, Matthew Cowdrey won 5 gold medals, 2 silver medals and 1 bronze medal and Ellie Cole won 4 gold medals and 2 bronze medals.
Detailed Australian Results

=== 2016 Rio Paralympics ===
==== Team members ====
Swimmers::

- Men: – Joshua Alford (d), Michael Anderson, Jesse Aungles (d), Liam Bekric (d), Blake Cochrane, Rowan Crothers (d), Timothy Disken (d), Daniel Fox, Matthew Haanappel, Brenden Hall, Guy Harrison-Murray (d), Timothy Hodge (d), Braedan Jason (d), Ahmed Kelly, Matthew Levy, Jeremy McClure, Rick Pendleton, Logan Powell (d), Sean Russo, Liam Schulter (d), Jacob Templeton (d)
- Women: – Emily Beecroft (d), Ellie Cole, Katja Dedekind (d), Maddison Elliott, Tanya Huebner (d), Jenna Jones (d), Paige Leonhardt (d), Ashleigh McConnell (d), Monique Murphy (d), Lakeisha Patterson (d), Madeleine Scott (d), Tiffany Thomas Kane (d), Rachael Watson (d), Prue Watt, Kate Wilson (d)

Head coach: Brendan Keogh
Team Leader: Adam Pine
Coaches' - Angelo Basalo, Jan Cameron, Harley Connolly, Nathan Doyle, Lachlan Falvey, Rick Van Der Zant, Yuriy Vdovychenko

- Assistant Team Leaders - Michelle Doyle, Ian Armbruster
- Sports science - Brendan Burkett
- Biomechanist - Danielele Formosa
- Team Doctor - Caron Jander
- Physiotherapists - David Spurrier, Brett Doring
- Soft Tissue Therapists - Jacqui Gilbert, Samantha Short
- Psychologist - Thomas Tapper
- Carer - Jeanette Phillips-Hughes

==== Medal tally ====
- Gold: 9
- Silver: 10
- Bronze: 10

Leading swimmers were: Maddison Elliott five medals including three gold, Ellie Cole six medals including two gold and Lakeisha Patterson six medals including two gold.
Detailed Australian Results

=== 2020 Tokyo Paralympics ===
==== Team members ====
Swimmers::

- Men: - Jesse Aungles, Ricky Betar, Blake Cochrane, Rowan Crothers, Timothy Disken, Thomas Gallagher, Brenden Hall, Benjamin Hance, Timothy Hodge, Braedan Jason, Ahmed Kelly, Matt Levy, William Martin, Jake Michel, Grant Patterson, Col Pearse, Ben Popham, Liam Schluter, Alexander Tuckfield
- Women: Emily Beecroft, |Ellie Cole, Katja Dedekind, Jasmine Greenwood, Kirralee Hayes, Paige Leonhardt, Ashleigh McConnell, Madeleine McTernan, Lakeisha Patterson, Keira Stephens, Ruby Storm, Tiffany Thomas Kane, Ashley Van Rijswijk, Isabella Vincent, Rachael Watson

Staff: Head coach: Brendan Keogh Team Leader: Adam Pine Coaches' - Jon Bell, Clinton Camilleri, Harley Connolly, Nathan Doyle, Kate Sparkes, Greg Towle, Yuriy Vdovychenko Support staff -

- Assistant Team Leaders - Michelle Doyle, Andrew MacGregor
- Performance services manager – Jodi Cossor
- Biomechanist - Simon Pearson
- Physiologist - Katie McGibbon
- Team Doctor - Viran De Silva
- Physiotherapists - Brett Doring, Dean Sullivan,
- Soft Tissue Therapists - Thea Dillon
- Psychologist - Geoff Lovell
- Assistant – Jeanette Phillips-Hughes

==== Medal tally ====
- Gold: 8
- Silver: 10
- Bronze: 15

Leading swimmers were: William Martin four medals including three gold, Ben Popham and Rowan Crothers three medals - two gold and 1 silver. Ellie Cole two bronze medals resulted in her winning 17 Paralympic medals and replaced Priya Cooper as leading Australian female swimming medallist.
Detailed Australian Results

=== 2024 Paris Paralympics ===
==== Team members ====
Swimmers::

- Men: - Jesse Aungles, Ricky Betar, Lewis Bishop, Rowan Crothers, Thomas Gallagher, Brenden Hall, Benjamin Hance, Timothy Hodge, Jack Ireland, Ahmed Kelly, Jake Michel. Grant Patterson, Col Pearse, Alex Saffy, Callum Simpson
- Women: Emily Beecroft, Katja Dedekind, Jasmine Greenwood, Ella Jones, Jenna Jones, Paige Leonhardt, Madeleine McTernan, Lakeisha Patterson, Keira Stephens, Ruby Storm, Holly Warn, Rachael Watson, Poppy Wilson

Staff: Head coach: Greg Towle Team Manager: Anna Johnson, Assistant: Shannon Baker, Casy Atkins Coaches' - Jon Bell, Harley Connolly, Nathan Doyle, David Heyden, Andrew Howard, Misha Payne, Martin Roberts, Kate Sparkes, Support staff -

- Assistant Team Managers - Shannon Baker, Casy Atkins
- Biomechanist - Koji Honda, Simon Pearson
- Recovery Physiologist - Katie McGibbon
- Team Doctor - Danielle Jacobs
- Physiotherapists - Brett Doring, Krystal Sharp
- Soft Tissue Therapists - Erin Haske
- Psychologist - Wendy Swift
- Carer - Jennie Phillips-Hughes

==== Medal tally ====
- Gold: 6
- Silver: 8
- Bronze: 13

Individual Gold medallists: Thomas Gallagher, Alexa Leary, Timothy Hodge, Benjamin Hance, Callum Simpson
Detailed Australian Results

== See also ==
- Australian Swim Team
