= Anne Brunell =

Australian Paralympic swimmer (born 1970)

Anne Currie
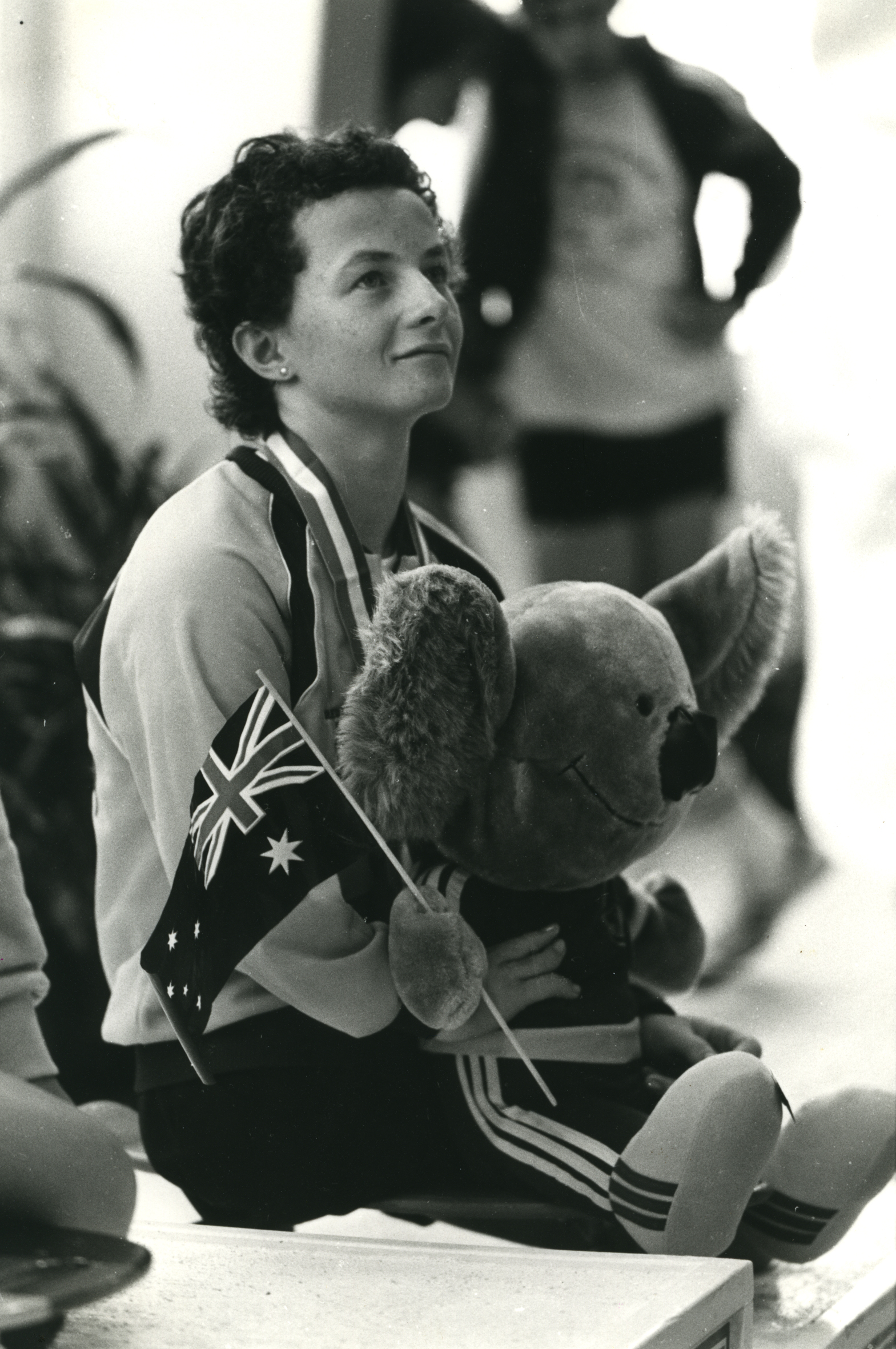
- Anne Currie at the medal ceremony of the 1992 Summer Paralympics in Barcelona.

Personal information
- Full name: Anne Nicole Currie
- Nationality: Australia
- Born: 13 July 1970 (age 56)
- Education: Dandenong Business College
- Spouse: Brendan Brunell (1996-present)

Sport
- Club: Nunawading Swimming Club
Medal record
Swimming
Paralympic Games
Gold medal – first place	1992 Barcelona	Women's 4x50 m Freestyle S1–6
Gold medal – first place	1992 Barcelona	Women's 200 m Freestyle S6
Gold medal – first place	1992 Barcelona	Women's 100 m Freestyle S6
Bronze medal – third place	1984 New York/Stoke Mandeville	Women's 100 m Freestyle A1
Bronze medal – third place	1992 Barcelona	Women's 50 m Freestyle S6
World Championships and Games for the Disabled
Gold medal – first place	1990 Assen	Women's 100m Freestyle S6
Gold medal – first place	1990 Assen	Women's 50m Freestyle S6
Gold medal – first place	1990 Assen	Women's 4x100m Freestyle Relay S7
Silver medal – second place	1990 Assen	Women's 4x100m Freestyle Relay S1
Silver medal – second place	1998 Seoul	Women's 4x100m Freestyle Relay

Anne Nicole Brunell, OAM (née Currie; born 13 July 1970) is an Australian Paralympic swimmer who was born with a limb deficiency. She started competitive swimming at the age of 11 and swam for the Nunawading Swimming Club. Currie competed internationally at the 1984 New York / Stoke Mandeville Games, where she won a bronze medal in the Women's 100 m Freestyle A1 event. At the age of 13 years and 11 months, this made her the youngest Australian Paralympic medallist at that time. Currie went on to compete at the 1986 Surakarta FESPIC Games, the 1988 Seoul Paralympic Games, the 1989 Kobe FESPIC Games, the Assen 1990 World Championships and Games for the Disabled, and the 1992 Barcelona Paralympic Games.

Currie won a Medal of the Order of Australia in 1993 for service to the Australian Paralympic swimming movement and was appointed Athlete Liaison Officer for the 2000 Sydney Paralympic Games. Currie received the Australian Sports Medal from the then Prime Minister John Howard in 2000 and was inducted into the Victorian Honour Roll of Women in 2007.

== Early life ==
Anne Nicole Brunell (née Currie) was born on 13 July 1970 at the Royal Women's Hospital, Carlton, Victoria. She was born with a stump extending to her knee on her left side and a stump extending past her hip on her right side, along with three fingers on her right hand. At birth, doctors were unable to identify why Currie was born with a limb deficiency but were able to rule out prenatal thalidomide poisoning as a possible contributor. Currie was put up for adoption by her birth parents at St Gabriel's Babies' Home, Kew, Victoria. After four years, Currie was adopted by Ian and Phyllis Currie, who took a liking to her after she asked Ian to "pick me up and touch the roof". Ian and Phyl Currie both grew up in Benalla, Victoria. As a youngster, Ian was involved in sport and played for the local Benalla Football Club, winning best first-year player in December 1953. Ian also bowled for the local Benalla cricket team. Ian went on to become a sales engineer. Currie was Phyllis's first adoptee, however throughout her lifetime Phyllis would foster over fifty children. Phyllis won the Medal of the Order of Australia on 26 January 1998 and was featured on the Australia Day 1998 Honors List for ‘…service to children as a foster parent, to the Amputees Association of Victoria and to the community’. Ian and Phyllis Currie had four children of their own, who are step siblings to Anne.

== Schooling ==
Currie grew up in Glen Waverly, Victoria, and attended Glendal Primary School where she would become sport house vice captain. Currie was one of the first students with such a visible disability to attend Glendal Primary School, however remembers the school as being inclusive. Her favorite subjects were English and Sport.

Currie attended Syndal Technical School in Mount Waverly and graduated at the end of Year Ten in 1986, before receiving a scholarship to attend Dandenong Business College. Currie graduated with two honors and seven credits.

Throughout these years, Currie wore a prosthesis for extra mobility, however also moved around using a skateboard. Currie won her first skateboard at a beachside carnival in Rye, Victoria at the age of six.

== Introduction to Swimming ==
Currie was taught to float by her older sister Norma in their backyard pool. Currie went on to complete her Herald Learn to Swim Certificate – an initiative established by Frank Beaurepaire in 1929 which granted Victorian children a competency certificate if they could successfully swim 25 yards. With the assistance of Norma, Currie would learn all four swimming strokes. Currie began swimming for the Nunawading Swimming Club under coach Leigh Nugent and competed in the first National Titles for Amputees in 1981 in Toowoomba, Queensland where she created three records in backstroke, breastroke and freestyle. Currie said that after this competition, her swimming career “…really took off…”.

== Swimming career ==
=== 1984 New York / Stoke Mandeville Summer Paralympic Games ===
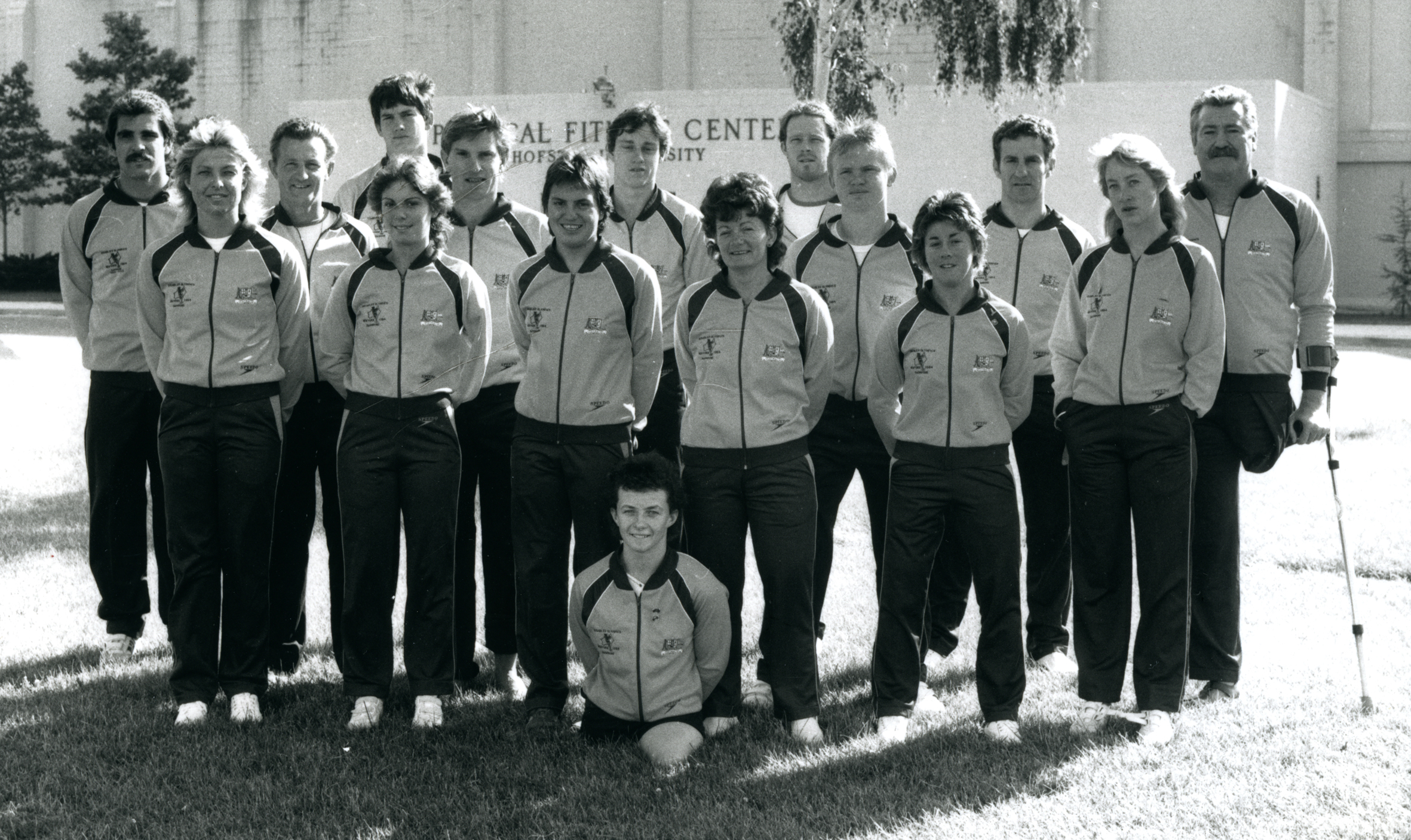
The Australian amputee swim team at the 1984 New York Summer Paralympic Games. Centre front is Anne Currie.

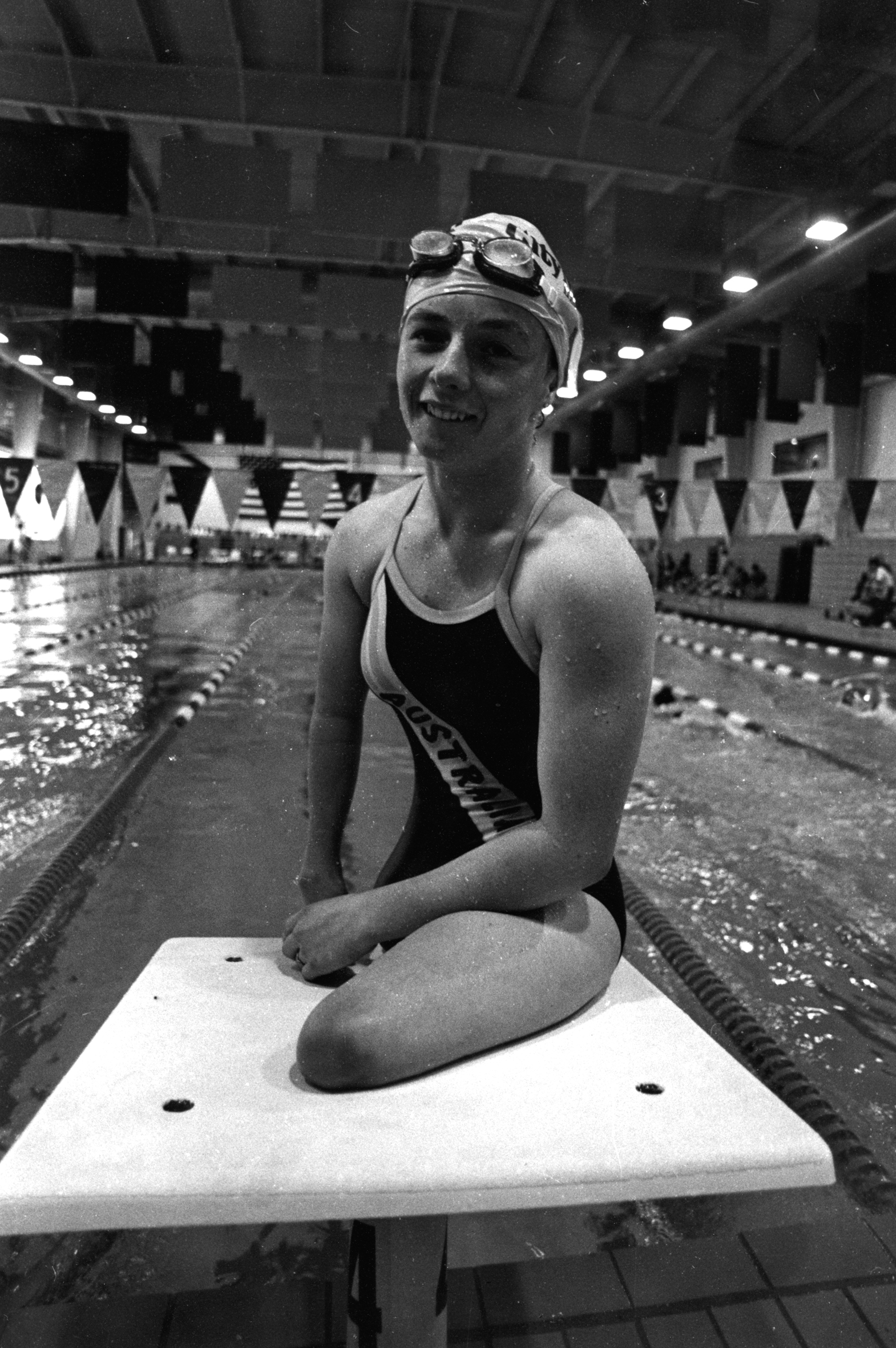
Anne Currie takes a break during a training session at the 1984 New York Summer Paralympic Games.

At the age of 13 years and 11 months, Currie qualified for the 1984 Summer Paralympic Games in New York City, New York, United States after breaking her personal best in the 100m freestyle by five seconds. Currie won bronze in the final of the Women's A1 100m freestyle, becoming the youngest Australian Paralympic medallist. Currie was surpassed by 13-year-old Maddison Elliot who won gold for Australia at the London, United Kingdom Summer Paralympic Games in 2012. Currie remembers the 1984 Summer Paralympic Games as a “…huge turning point…” for herself as both a disabled individual and athlete as a variety of disabled peoples were represented.

=== 1986 Surakarta Far East and South Pacific International Conference (FESPIC) Games ===
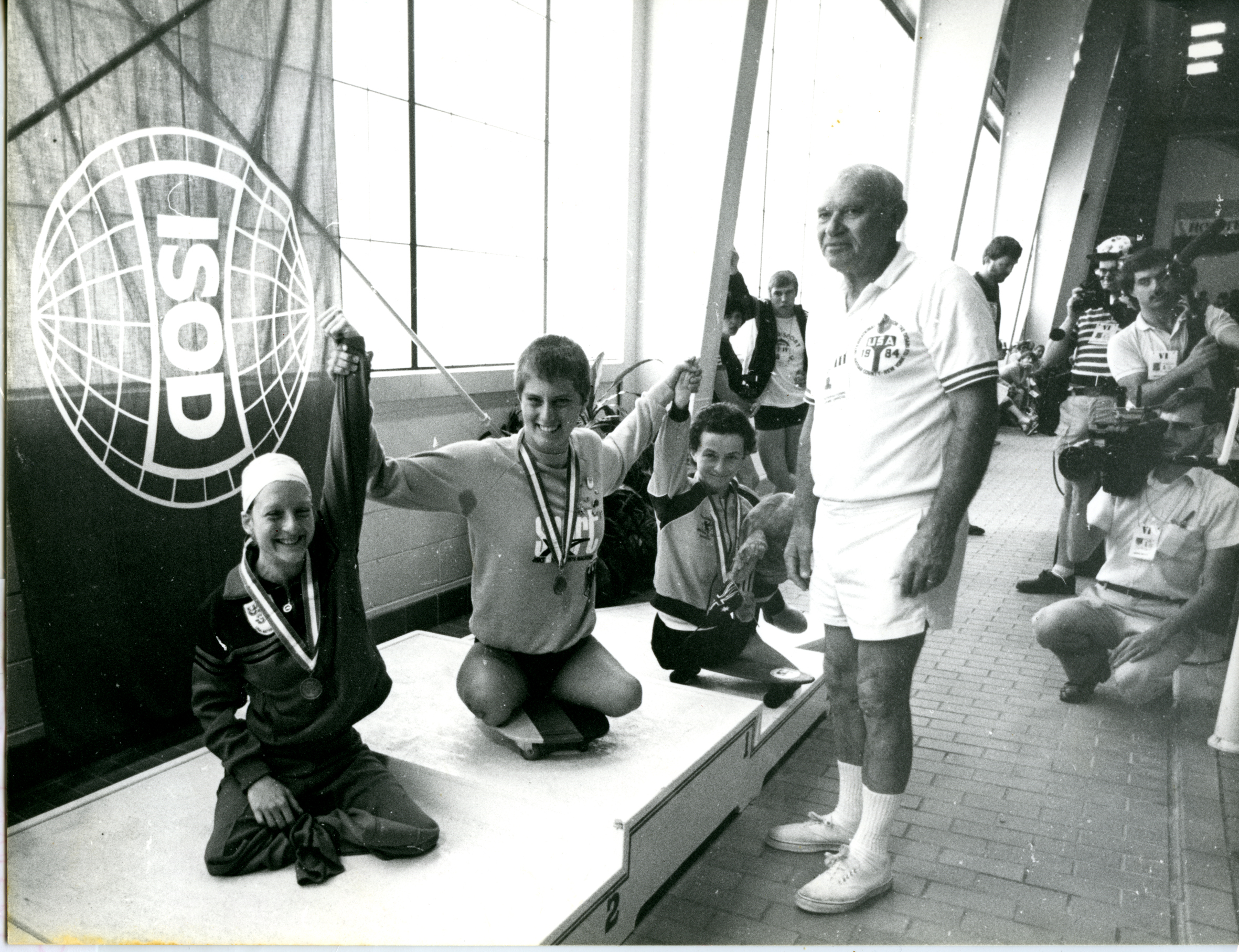
Anne Currie (third from left) winning bronze in the A1 100m freestyle medal ceremony at the 1984 New York Summer Paralympic Games.

Currie competed at the 1986 FESPIC Games in Surakarta, Indonesia and won four gold medals, including a world record in the 100m breastroke. Currie remembers the questionable water quality and the coach of the Australian Paralympic swim team at the time – Peter Carroll – informing swimmers to “…shut your mouth and swim” ... After her performance, Currie received an award under the National Disabled Athlete Award Scheme and was congratulated by the then Minister for Sport, Recreation and Tourism, Mr John Brown. Currie received a sporting grant which was designed to assist elite disabled athletes in pursuing their sporting goals.

=== 1988 Seoul Summer Paralympic Games ===
Currie qualified for the 1988 Summer Paralympics in Seoul, South Korea. Since the 1940s, swimming classifications had been based on athletes’ medical conditions. To encourage inclusiveness and respect towards different disabilities, the number of classifications for para-swimming increased during the 1980s. At the 1988 Summer Paralympic Games, two pools had to be utilized to ensure that all events could proceed as 31 classifications now existed. Organising events proved difficult as there was often an insufficient number of swimmers in each classification. Currie qualified to compete in several individual events, however they were cancelled as they did not adhere to the mandate that each event must contain swimmers from at least five different countries. Currie competed in the Women's 4 × 100 m medley relay which came in fourth, and the Women's 4 × 100 m freestyle relay which won silver. Currie has since claimed that she was not the only athlete affected by this classification system.

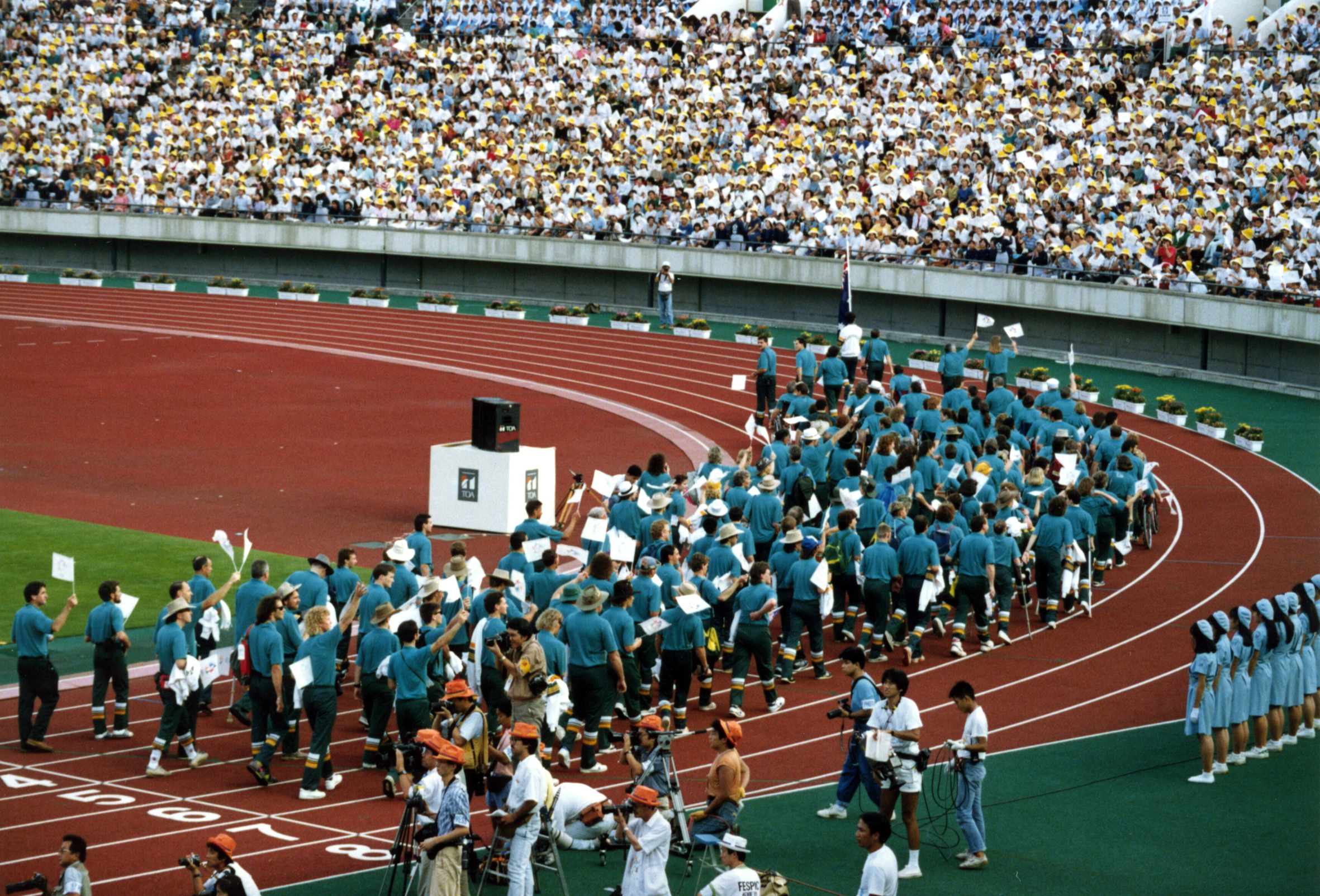
The Australian Team at the 1989 Kobe, Japan FESPIC Opening Ceremony.

=== 1989 Kobe Far East and South Pacific International Conference (FESPIC) Games ===
Currie competed at the 1989 Kobe, Japan FESPIC Games. Currie became sick the night before her Women's 100m freestyle final, however won gold in that event along with gold in the Women's 50m freestyle and 200m freestyle.

=== 1990 Assen World Championships and Games for the Disabled ===
Currie qualified for the 1990 Assen, Netherlands World Championships and Games for the Disabled. Currie won gold medals in the Women's 50m freestyle, 100m freestyle and the 4 × 100 m freestyle relay. Currie broke world records in both the 50m and 100m freestyle events, achieving a personal best time of 44.81 seconds for the 50m freestyle. Currie won silver in the Women's 4 × 100 m medley relay and fourth in the 200m and 800m freestyle events.

Currie was named as Women's Captain of the Australian team and recalls that it was “…a great honour…’ as she was able to mentor and support younger disabled athletes.

=== 1992 Barcelona Summer Paralympic Games ===
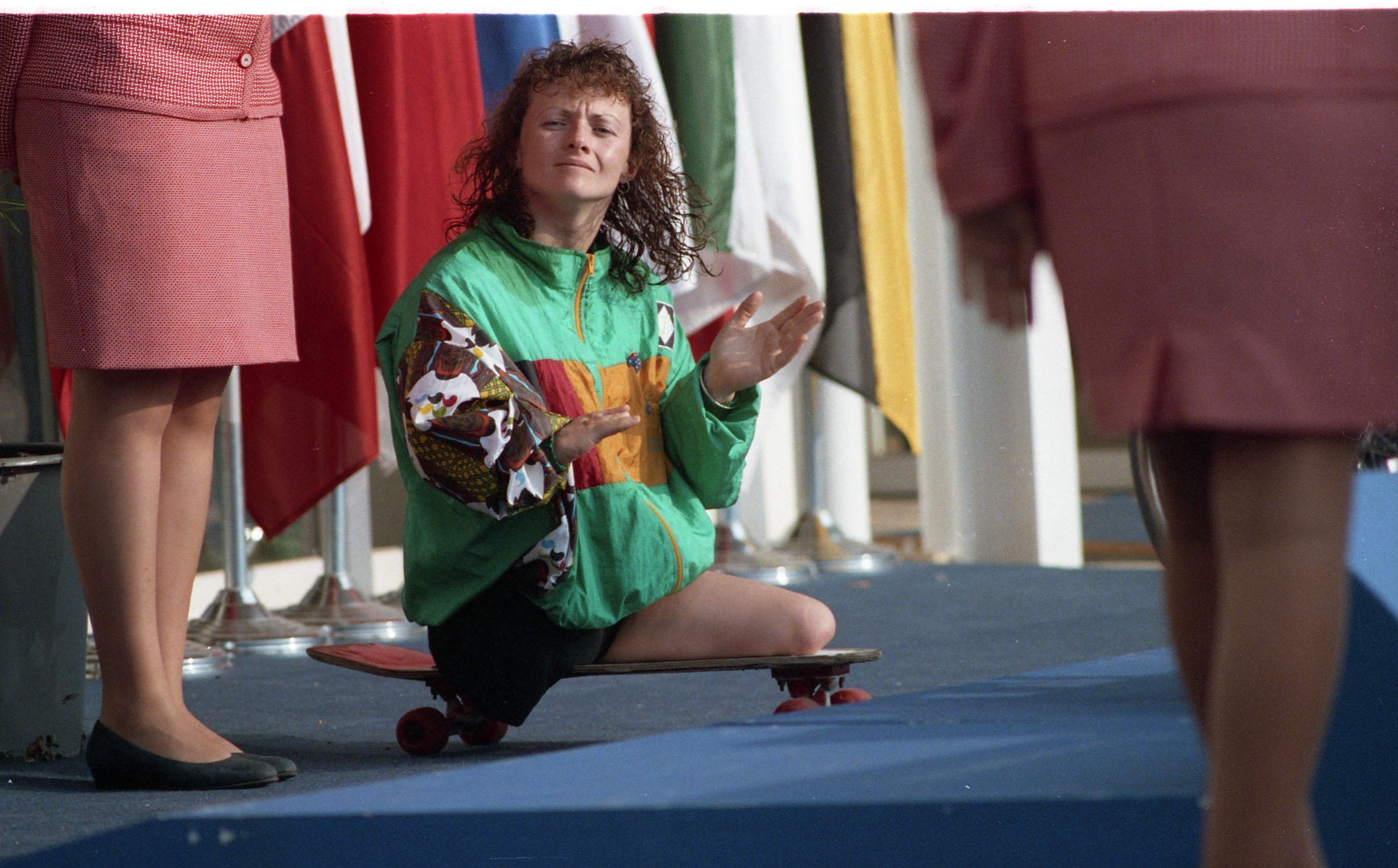
Currie at a medal ceremony at the 1992 Barcelona, Spain Summer Paralympic Games.

Currie qualified for the 1992 Barcelona, Spain Summer Paralympic Games. Before embarking to Barcelona, Currie was commended in an address to the Australian Paralympic Federation Luncheon in Melbourne, Victoria by Leader of the Opposition John Hewson on the 30 June 1992. Hewson congratulated Currie for the physical barriers she had overcome and her contribution to Paralympic swimming. These Games were the first to implement a classification system based upon function rather than type of disability. The number of classifications dropped from 31 at the 1988 Paralympic Games to 10 at these Games. This ensured that Paralympic sport became fair, not equal. Currie was grouped into the S6 category which includes athletes with disabilities such as loss of two arms, short stature, and moderate coordination problems on one side of body.

Currie won gold in the Women's 4 x 50m Freestyle Relay S1 – S6, Women's 200m Freestyle S6, Women's 100m Freestyle S6 and bronze in the Women's 50m Freestyle S6. Currie beat the world record in the Women's 200m Freestyle S6 event by 6 seconds, finishing in 3 minutes and 11.14 seconds. Currie was appointed Women's Captain of the Australian team.

Currie officially retired from competitive swimming after these Games. She has later stated that:

“I've achieved everything that I can possibly achieve in swimming, my main goal was to win a gold medal in world record time at the Paralympic Games, I was lucky to realise this goal 3 times and I'm going to retire on a high."

For her service to the Paralympics movement, Currie won a Medal of the Order of Australia in 1993 and was featured on the Queen's Birthday Honour List on the 13 June 1993.

== Post Swimming Career ==
Currie married Brendan Brunell and together they have two sons.

Brendan is related to the Australian Football League player Jack Dyer.

Currie was featured in a ‘This is Your Life’ episode in 1995 which aired on the Channel Nine Network. Currie was featured in a 1998 book edited by David Mitchell called 'This is Your Life: True Stories of Great Australians', which tells the life stories of ninety Australian individuals who appeared on the 'This is Your Life' television show. Currie's Mother and sister were interviewed, alongside swimmers Nicole Stevenson and Dawn Fraser who spoke of her rise to fame and success within the international disabled swimming community. Currie was also featured in the magazine 'Women in Sport' where an article written by Tina Luton further described her 'This is Your Life' episode.

Currie was appointed as an Athlete Liaison Officer for the 2000 Sydney, Australia Paralympic Games. In this role, Currie and other Athlete Liaison Officers operated out of an office in the Paralympic Village, where Paralympic athletes had the opportunity to ask questions and receive support and advice from former Paralympic athletes.

Currie was a volunteer and past Vice President of the Amputees Association.

Currie was involved in The Australian Paralympic Oral History Project where twenty-seven pioneering Australian Paralympic athletes were interviewed by historians. Currie's interview was published on Trove and the National Library of Australia's catalogue.

Currie has spoken to primary and secondary schools, and Rotary Clubs as a motivational speaker. In September 2021, Currie spoke to students at Punchbowl Public School over Zoom. Currie spoke to students about how her disability did not stop her from achieving her goals, and that this was due to hard work and positivity.

== Recognition ==
Currie was showcased within a 1992 book edited by Susanna Bryceson and Pia Herbert called 'The Making of Champions'. Over six pages of typed text, Currie retells her life story and emphasizes the support systems she had growing up, her biggest barriers to success and her greatest achievements. Currie highlights that winning at the 1992 Barcelona Summer Paralympic Games would not be crucial, but would rather be a privilege to swim with the best.

Currie was recognised within a 1993 book written by Anthony M. Stewart called 'Secrets of Success: A Pictorial Tribute to Australian Sporting Men and Women.' Stewart's purpose in writing this book was to highlight the determination and resilience of sportsmen and women who had represented Australia up until 1993. Currie was congratulated as 'Australia's number one amputee sportsperson and a most outstanding sportswoman.'

Currie was recognised again within a 1995 book written by Anthony M. Stewart called 'To the Top - A Personal Best Approach to Success'. Currie was asked to provide a success tip which reads "If you want to achieve great things in life, be prepared to make sacrifices, set goals and realise that your accomplishments will usually reflect how hard you have worked."

Currie received an Australian Sports Medal on the 22 June 2000 from the then Australian Prime Minister John Howard. This award recognised Australian athletes, coaches, office holders, sports scientists and those who tended sporting facilities and grounds who had contributed to Australia's sporting success. She has later stated that this award was "...pretty high up there...".

Currie was inducted into the Victorian Honour Roll of Women in 2007. This award continues to recognise Victorian women who show excellence, determination and leadership in a range of fields.

In 2024, she was inducted into Australian Paralympic Hall of Fame
