= Brendan Keogh =

Brendan Keogh may refer to:

- Brendan Keogh (hurler)
- Brendan Keogh (coach)
