= Anne Green (swimming) =

Australian swimming coach (1951–2022)

Anne Green (5 March 1951 – 30 November 2022) was an Australian swimming coach and administrator particularly in relation to disability sport. She was Chair of the International Paralympic Committee Swimming Executive Committee from 1992 to 2006.

== Personal ==
She was born on 5 March 1951 in Perth, Western Australia. Her father was prominent Australian sport administrator Jack Howson and mother was Elizabeth Weddeburn. She attended Presbyterian Ladies' College, Perth. She has a son Clayton.

Green died of cancer on 30 November 2022 in Perth.

== Sport ==
Green started swimming at the age of eight. She was coached by Kevin Duff but stopped competitive swimming at the age of 17. She was employed as a coach at the Kevin Duff Swimming Centre in Perth. In 1981, she started to teach swimming for those with a disability at the Melville Aquatic Centre. She used the Halliwick Method for her coaching approach. Her first prominent Paralympic swimmer was amputee Jason Diederich.

She was appointed Australian Swimming National Co-ordinator for Disabled in 1990. The position was funded by the Australian Sports Commission. At the time of her appointment, Green was the only Australian fully qualified as a technical classifier. She had studied in France the previous year to obtain international status to classify the degree of functional disability as it was applied to swimming. Green departed Australian Swimming in December 2000.

Green was a swimming coach on the Australian teams - 1990 World Championships and Games for the Disabled, 1992 Barcelona Paralympics and 1993 and 1997 World Deaf Games.

Green was the International Paralympic Committee Swimming Chair from 1992 to 2006. She was Technical Delegate for three IPC Swimming World Championships - 1994, 1998, 2002 and Technical Delegate for two Paralympic Games - 1996 and 2000.

In 2000, she was awarded the Australian Sports Medal. In 2002, she was awarded the John K. Williams Jr International Adapted Aquatics Award by the International Swimming Hall Of Fame for her service to people with disabilities. Her citation stated that Green "dedicated herself to providing swimmers with disabilities fairness in classification, equal access to elite competition, and impartiality in rules and regulations.

== Publications ==
- Coaching swimmers with disabilities.Canberra, Australian Swimming, 1991, VHS Video
- Swimming against the current: a practical teaching and coaching manual for swimmers with disabilities, 2010. (Three editions published)
