= Lyn Lillecrapp =

Australian Paralympic swimmer

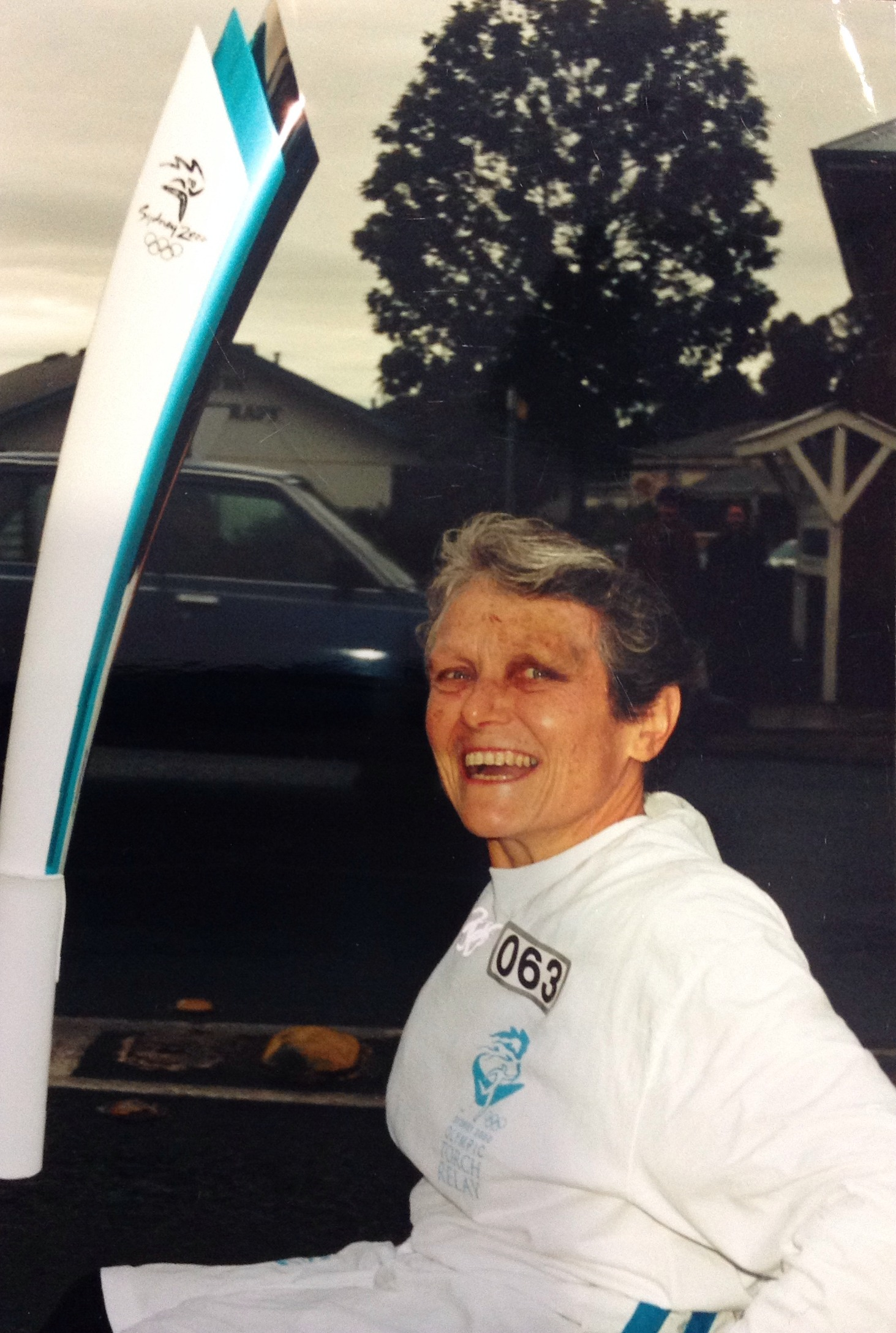
- Lillecrapp in July 2000

Personal information
- Full name: Lynette Margaret Lillecrapp
- Nationality: Australian
- Born: 1945 (age 80–81) Albury, Australia
Medal record
Women's para swimming
Representing Australia
Paralympic Games
Silver medal – second place	1976 Toronto	25 m Freestyle 2
Silver medal – second place	1976 Toronto	3x25 m Individual Medley 2
Silver medal – second place	1988 Seoul	50 m Breaststroke 2
Bronze medal – third place	1988 Seoul	50 m Freestyle 2
Bronze medal – third place	1988 Seoul	50 m Backstroke 2
Bronze medal – third place	1988 Seoul	25 m Butterfly 2
World Championships and Games for the Disabled
Silver medal – second place	1990 Assen	100m Backstroke S6
Bronze medal – third place	1990 Assen	50m Freestyle S6

Lynette Margaret "Lyn" Lillecrapp, OAM (née Michael; born 1945) is an Australian Paralympic swimmer. She contracted paralytic polio at the age of two months. Lillecrapp started her competitive swimming career in 1974, and competed at the 1976 Toronto, 1988 Seoul and 1992 Barcelona Summer Paralympics.

== Swimming ==
=== Paralympic Games ===
Lillecrapp won two silver medals at the 1976 Toronto Games in the Women's 25m Freestyle 2 and Women's 3x25m Individual Medley 2 events. She won three bronze medals at the 1988 Seoul Games in the Women's 50m Freestyle 2, Women's 50m Backstroke 2, and Women's 25m Butterfly 2 events, and a silver medal in the Women's 50m Breaststroke 2 event. She won several medals at the International Stoke Mandeville Games, including four gold and a bronze in 1989, seven gold and two silver in 1990, and five gold, a silver and a bronze in 1991. She participated in the 1992 Barcelona Paralympics in distances ranging from 50 to 200m in all individual strokes and as a participant in the medley relay, but did not win any medals at those Games.

=== State Swimming ===
In the Swimming SA State Sprints in March 2009, she won multiple silver medals in the 50m butterfly, 50m backstroke, 50m breaststroke and 50m freestyle events. She holds two current Multi-Class Australian Records: short-course 100m Butterfly S5 (set 2009) and 100m Individual Medley SM5 (set 2010). She competed in the Multi-Class 100m butterfly at the Victorian Open Championships on 11 January 2013, racing the best young swimmers with disability in the state and visiting Paralympian Kayla Clarke. She came last in a straight final, but beat her entry time by 14 seconds. At the South Australian State short course championships on 17 July 2013, Lillecrapp broke her own individual medley S5 record by 2.5 seconds, and in 2014 again broke her own Australian short course multi-class record in the 100m butterfly. She currently holds SA State short course multi-class records in the 100m freestyle, 50 & 100m backstroke, 50 & 100m butterfly and 100m individual medley, and SA State long course records in 50m freestyle, 50m backstroke, 50m breaststroke, and 50m butterfly.

=== Masters Swimming ===
In 2009, Lillecrapp was swimming at the Masters level. She competed at the Australian Masters Games in February 2009 in Geelong where she won many gold medals including in the Result 4 x 50m Female Medley Relay, 4 x 50m Mixed Medley Relay, 50m freestyle, 50m breaststroke, 50m backstroke and 50m butterfly. She won a silver medal in the 100m freestyle at the same event. She also competed in the Australian Masters Games in 2011 in Adelaide and Geelong in 2013, winning gold and silver medals at each Games.

She is currently a coach at the STARplex Swim Club in Gawler, South Australia.

== Recognition ==
In 1992, Lillecrapp received the Medal of the Order of Australia "For service to swimming, particularly as a gold medallist at the Stoke Mandeville World Wheelchair Championships". In 2009, she was inducted into the Swimming SA Hall of Fame.
