= Paul Gockel =

Australian Paralympic swimmer

Personal information
- Nationality: Australian
- Born: 28 October 1965 (age 60) Southport, Queensland, Australia
Medal record
Men's swimming
Representing Australia
Paralympic Games
Silver medal – second place	1996 Atlanta	4x100 m freestyle S7–10
World Championships and Games for the Disabled
Bronze medal – third place	1990 Assen	4x100m freestyle relay S7

Paul Gockel (born 10 October 1965) is an Australian Paralympic swimmer.

He was born in Southport, Queensland. He has spina bifida with partial paralysis below the waist. He attended Marist College Ashgrove.

He took up swimming seriously in his twenties. He participated in four events in swimming at the 1992 Barcelona Games. He won a silver medal at the 1996 Atlanta Games in the Men's 4x100 m Freestyle S7–10 event and swam in three individual events.

He met his wife Kerry-Lee, known as the Wingless Warrior, through swimming and both compete in open water swimming events.
