= Paul Cross (swimmer) =

Australian Paralympic swimmer (born 1979)

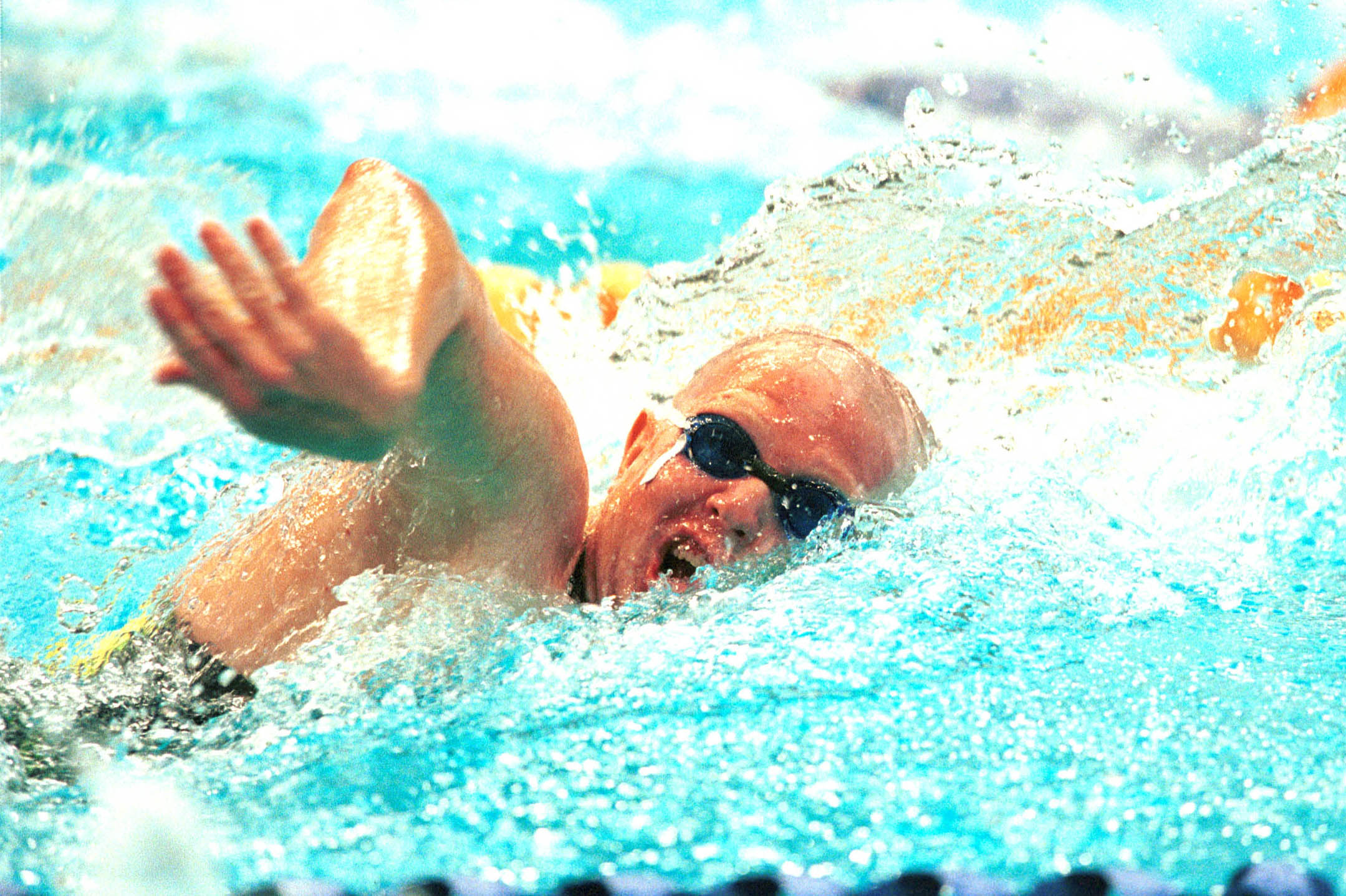
- Cross at the 2000 Summer Paralympics

Personal information
- Full name: Paul Damian Cross
- Nickname: crossy / reddog
- Nationality: Australia
- Born: 10 February 1979 (age 47) Brisbane, Queensland
- Height: 175
- Weight: 81 kg (179 lb)
Medal record
Swimming
Paralympic Games
Gold medal – first place	2000 Sydney	Men's 4x100 m Freestyle S14
IPC Swimming World Championships
Silver medal – second place	1998 Christchurch	Men's 50 m Butterfly
Silver medal – second place	1998 Christchurch	Men's 200 m Individual Medley

Paul Damian Cross, OAM (born 10 February 1979) is an Australian swimmer with an intellectual disability. He was born in Brisbane, Queensland. He competed at the 1996 Summer Paralympics in two events. At the 2000 Sydney Games, he competed in eight events and won a gold medal in the Men's 4 × 100 m Freestyle S14 swimming event, for which he received a Medal of the Order of Australia. In 2000, he received an Australian Sports Medal. In 1999, he was an Australian Institute of Sport Athlete with a Disability scholarship holder.

At the 1998 Christchurch IPC Swimming World Championships, he won silver medals in Men's 50m Butterfly and Men's 200m Individual Medley.

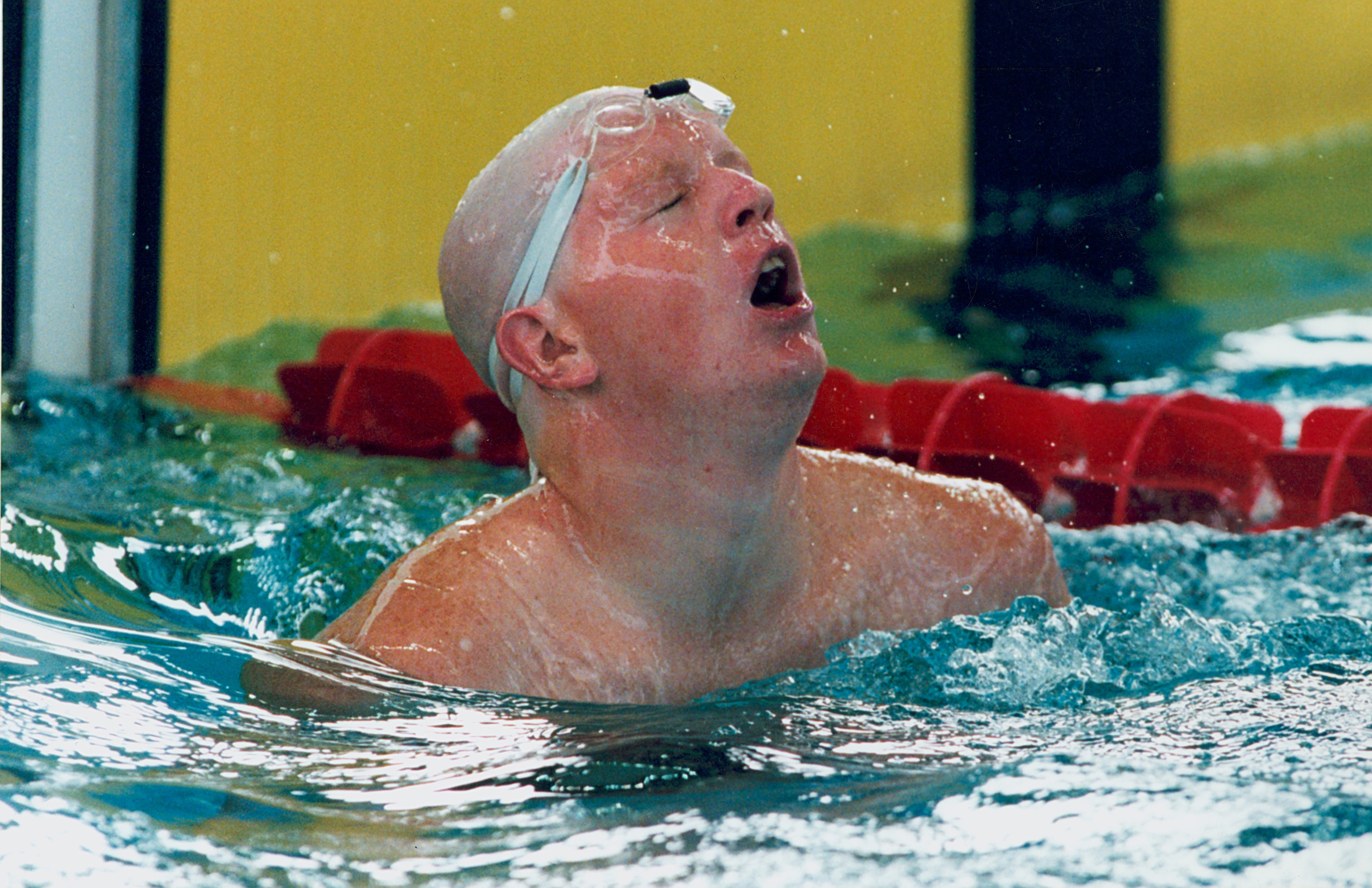
Cross at the end of a race at the 1996 Atlanta Paralympic Games
