= Marayke Jonkers =

Australian Paralympic swimmer and triathlete

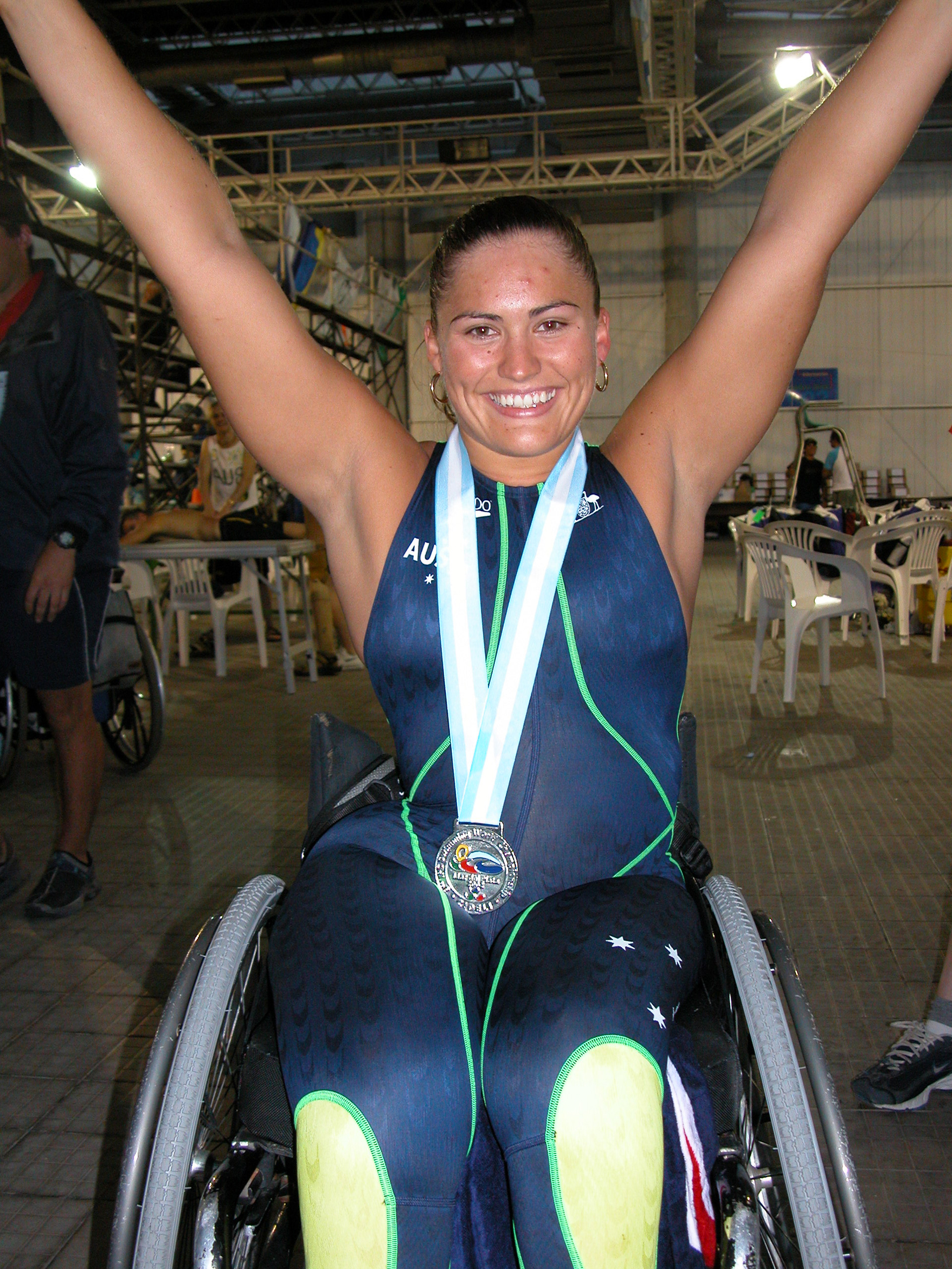
- Marayke Jonkers with her silver medal from the SM4 150 m individual medley at the 2002 IPC World Swimming Championships in Mar del Plata, Argentina

Personal information
- Nationality: Australia
- Born: 13 September 1981 (age 45) Hobart
Medal record
Swimming
Paralympic Games
Silver medal – second place	2008 Beijing	Women's 150 m Individual Medley SM4
Bronze medal – third place	2004 Athens	Women's 50 m Breaststroke SB3
Bronze medal – third place	2004 Athens	Women's 150 m Individual Medley SM4
IPC Swimming World Championships
Silver medal – second place	2002 Mar Del Plata	Women's 150 m Individual Medley SM4
Silver medal – second place	2002 Mar Del Plata	Women's 50 m Breaststroke
Bronze medal – third place	2010 Eindhoven	Women's 50 m Breaststroke SB3
Paratriathlon
ITU Triathlon World Championships
Bronze medal – third place	2010 Budapest	Women's Triathlon TRI-1

Marayke Caroline Jonkers (born 13 September 1981) is a retired Australian Paralympic swimmer and paratriathlete. She won two bronze medals at the 2004 Athens Paralympics and a silver medal at the 2008 Beijing Paralympics, along with a bronze medal at the 2010 Budapest ITU Triathlon World Championships.

== Personal ==
Jonkers was born on 13 September 1981 in Hobart, and moved to Queensland as a baby. She lives in the Sunshine Coast of Queensland. She became a paraplegic due to a car accident at the age of eight months. She studied Communications and Social Science at the University of the Sunshine Coast where she received two bachelor's degrees. She works as a motivational speaker. In 2009, she became a graduate employment consultant for STEPS Disability Qld.

As part of her university studies, she completed an internship with the Australian Broadcasting Corporation working in ABC Online and the Stateline television show. She has had stories published in The Sunshine Coast Daily and The Weekender. She answered fashion questions in the April 2008 edition of Link Magazine. She is the president of People with Disabilities Australia.

== Sporting career ==
In swimming, Jonkers competed in the S5 (classification) for freestyle, butterfly and backstroke as well as the SM4 individual medley and SB3 breaststroke events. She represents the Maroochydore Swimming Club at national competitions. Jonkers broke more than 70 Australian national swimming records in the breaststroke, individual medley, freestyle and butterfly. She also set a world record for the 100 m butterfly event.

Jonkers' began representing her state of Queensland at the age of twelve, and first represented Australia in 1999, winning a gold medal in that year's FESPIC Games. Her first Paralympics was the 2000 Sydney Games, where she placed fourth and sixth. At the 2002 IPC Swimming World Championships, she won two swimming silver medals. At the 2004 Athens Paralympics, Jonkers won two swimming bronze medals in the Women's 150 m Individual Medley SM4 and Women's 50 m Breaststroke SB3 events. She competed at the 2008 Beijing Paralympics, where she was one of Australia's oldest swimmers. She won a silver medal at the Games in the Women's 150 m Individual Medley SM4 event with a time of 3:28.88. In 2009, she set a world record in the 150 m individual medley at Australia's national short course championships held in Hobart. In 2010, she competed at the Queensland Swimming Age Multi Class Championships. She competed in the women's 100 m Breaststroke event, finishing third with a time of 02:50.59. In 2010, at the age of 30, she also competed at the 2010 Telstra Australian Championships the Over 12 years 150 m Medley event where she made the final finished with a time of 4:07.51. She also made the finals in the Over 12 years 50 m Breaststroke event. She was the Australian flag-bearer for the 2010 IPC Swimming World Championships in Eindhoven, the Netherlands, where she won a bronze medal in the 50 m breaststroke SB3 and was part of the 20-point 4×50 m relay team that broke an Oceania record.

Jonkers' first paratriathlon competition was as social event related to the 2009 ITU Triathlon World Championships in the Gold Coast. She became Australia's first female paratriathlete and paratriathlon medallist when she competed in the 2010 championships in Budapest, winning a bronze medal in the TRI-1 classification in a time of 2:12:40, eleven minutes better than her previous personal best. She had an Australian Institute of Sport Paralympic swimming scholarship.

On 9 December 2011, she announced her retirement from competitive swimming due to thoracic outlet syndrome.

== Recognition ==
Jonkers received an Australian Sports Medal in 2000. At the age of 23, she was named the 2005 Queensland Young Achiever by premier Peter Beattie. In 2007, she was named the inaugural winner of Cosmopolitan magazine's "fun fearless female award" recognising Australia's most inspirational women who are encouraging others to pursue their dreams. She was featured on page 76 of Cosmopolitan the month that she was recognised. She used her prize money to set up the "Sporting Dreams Fund", which helps people with disabilities to develop their sporting talents. In 2010, she was named the Sporting Wheelie of the Year by the Sporting Wheelies and Disabled Association. In 2011, she was an Australia Day Ambassador.
