= Brendan Keogh (coach) =

Australian paralympic swimming coach (born 1970)

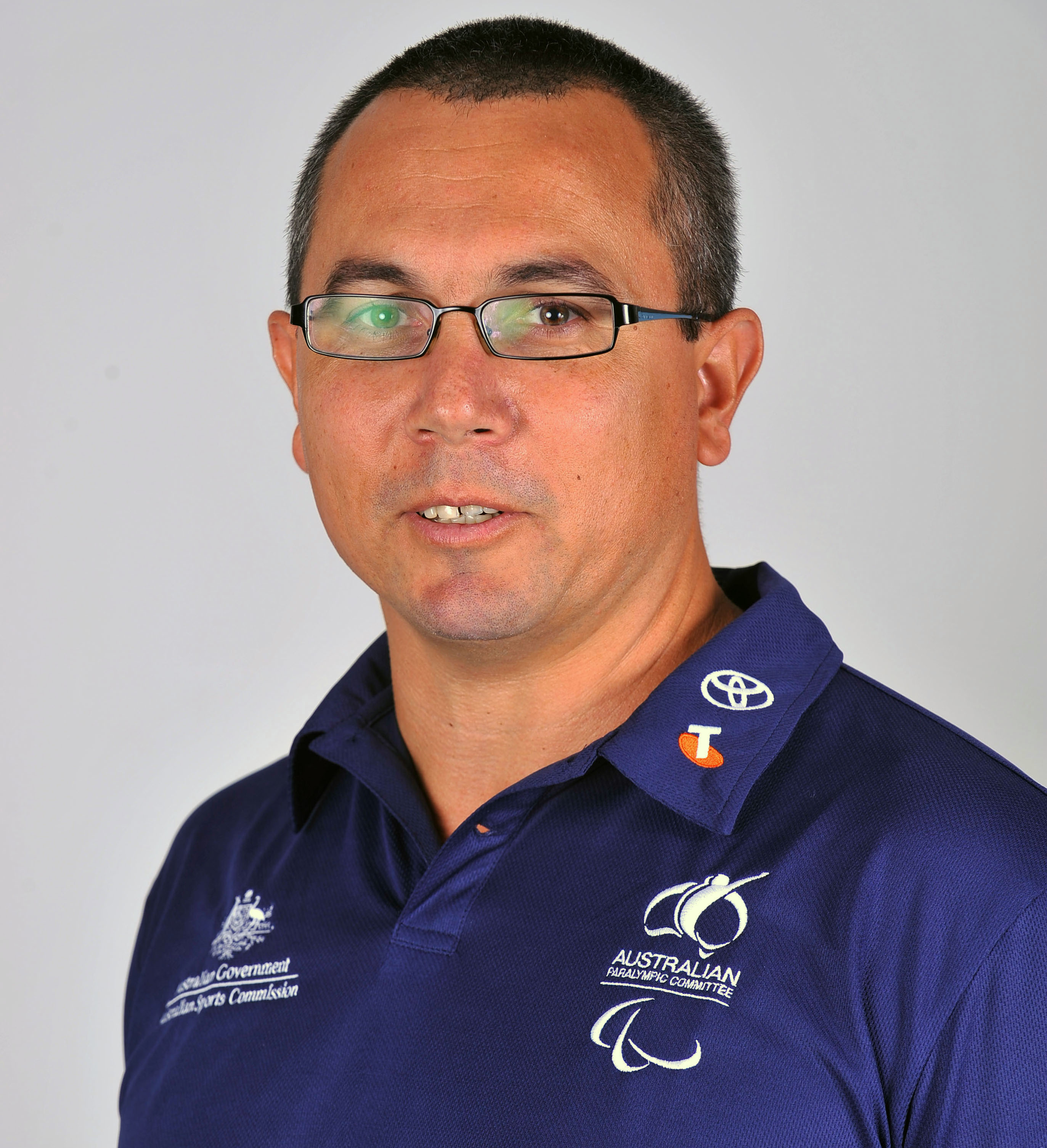
- 2012 Paralympic team portrait of Brendan Keogh.

Personal information
- Nationality: Australia
- Born: 8 December 1970; Penrith, New South Wales

Sport
- Sport: Paralympic Swimming
- Team: Genesis Christian College Aquatic Centre
- Retired: Formally 2012

Brendan Keogh (born 8 December 1970) in Penrith, New South Wales is an Australian Paralympic swimming coach who has over 20 years of swimming coaching experience. He has been an Australian coach at five successive Summer Paralympic Games - 2000, 2004, 2008, 2012 and 2016.

As of 2015, he is the lead coach of the Australian Paralympic Swimming Team along with Swimming Australia Paralympic performance manager Adam Pine. He was appointed head coach for the Australian Swim Team at the 2016 Rio Paralympics.

== Coaching ==
Keogh's first encounter with coaching Paralympic swimmers was as the personal coach to Tamara Nowitzki, who won a silver medal at the 2000 Paralympic Games in Sydney.

In 2002, he was appointed by the Australian Paralympic Committee as the head coach of the Australian Paralympic Swim Team for the 2002 IPC Swimming World Championships in Mar del Plata. In 2003, Swimming Australia took over administrative control of Paralympic Swimming from the Australian Paralympic Committee.

Keogh was then from this point employed by Swimming Australia within a full-time position. In 2004, he was appointed head coach for the Australian Paralympic swim team for the 2004 Paralympic Games. He led the team as head coach to each subsequent major international championship till his retirement in 2012.

He retired formally from international coaching shortly after the London 2012 Summer Paralympics and took up a coaching position at Genesis Christian College's Aquatic Centre. In announcing his retirement as head coach of the Paralympic swim team saying, "it didn’t come easy." Keogh is quoted saying, "working with Paralympic athletes for more than a decade has truly been the highlight of my career and something that I will forever cherish."

Keogh came out of retirement to resume his international coaching career when appointed "Lead Coach" of the Australian teams at the 2014 Para Pan Pacific Championships and 2015 IPC Swimming World Championships. He continues his coaching position at Genesis Christian College's Aquatic Centre.

In March 2015, Keogh with Glenn Beringen were appointed by Swimming Australia and Australian Commonwealth Games Association as coaches for the 2018 Commonwealth Games on the Gold Coast, Queensland to develop potential young athletes.

== Australian Swimming Coaching Positions ==
- Head coach – Summer Paralympic Games - Athens 2004, Beijing 2008, London 2012
- Coach – Summer Paralympic Games - Sydney 2000
- Coach – Commonwealth Games - Melbourne 2006, New Delhi 2010
- Head coach – IPC Swimming World Championships - Mar del Plata 2002, Durban 2006, Eidenhoven 2010, Glasgow 2015 (lead coach)
- Head coach - Paralympic Pan Pacific Championships - Edmonton 2011, Pasadena, California 2014 (Lead coach)
