= Brett Reid =

Australian Paralympic swimmer

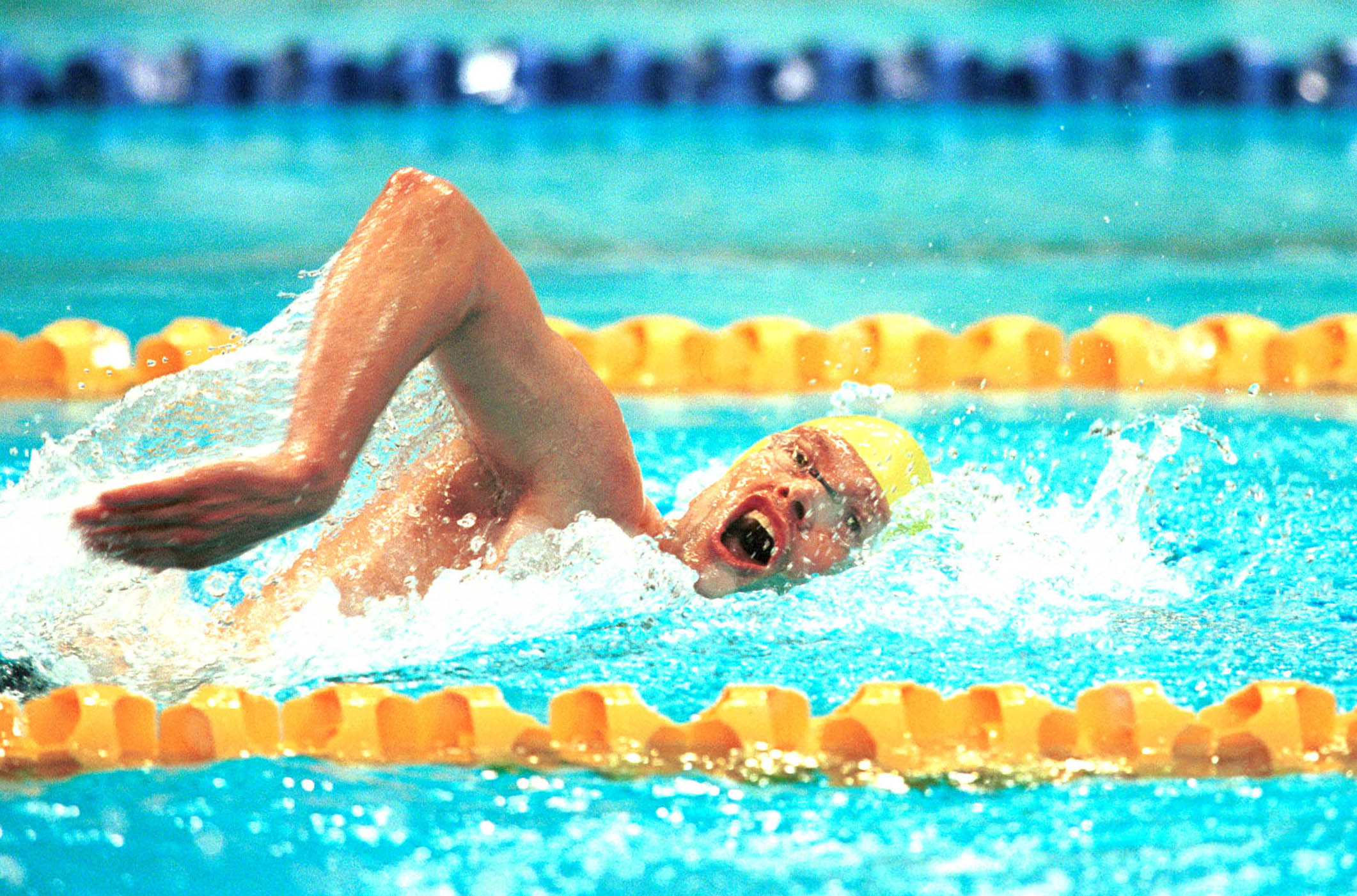
- Action shot of Reid in the pool at the 2000 Summer Paralympics

Personal information
- Full name: Brett Michael Reid
- Nationality: Australia
- Born: 29 October 1976 (age 49) Melbourne
Medal record
Swimming
Paralympic Games
Gold medal – first place	2000 Sydney	Men's 4x100 m Freestyle S14

Brett Michael Reid, OAM (born 29 October 1976) is an Australian Paralympic swimmer with an intellectual disability. He was born in Melbourne. He participated but did not win any medals at the 1996 Atlanta Paralympics. He won a gold medal at the 2000 Sydney Paralympics in the Men's 4x100 m Freestyle S14 event, for which he received a Medal of the Order of Australia. In 2000, he received an Australian Sports Medal.
