= Casey Redford =

Australian Paralympic swimmer (born 1982)

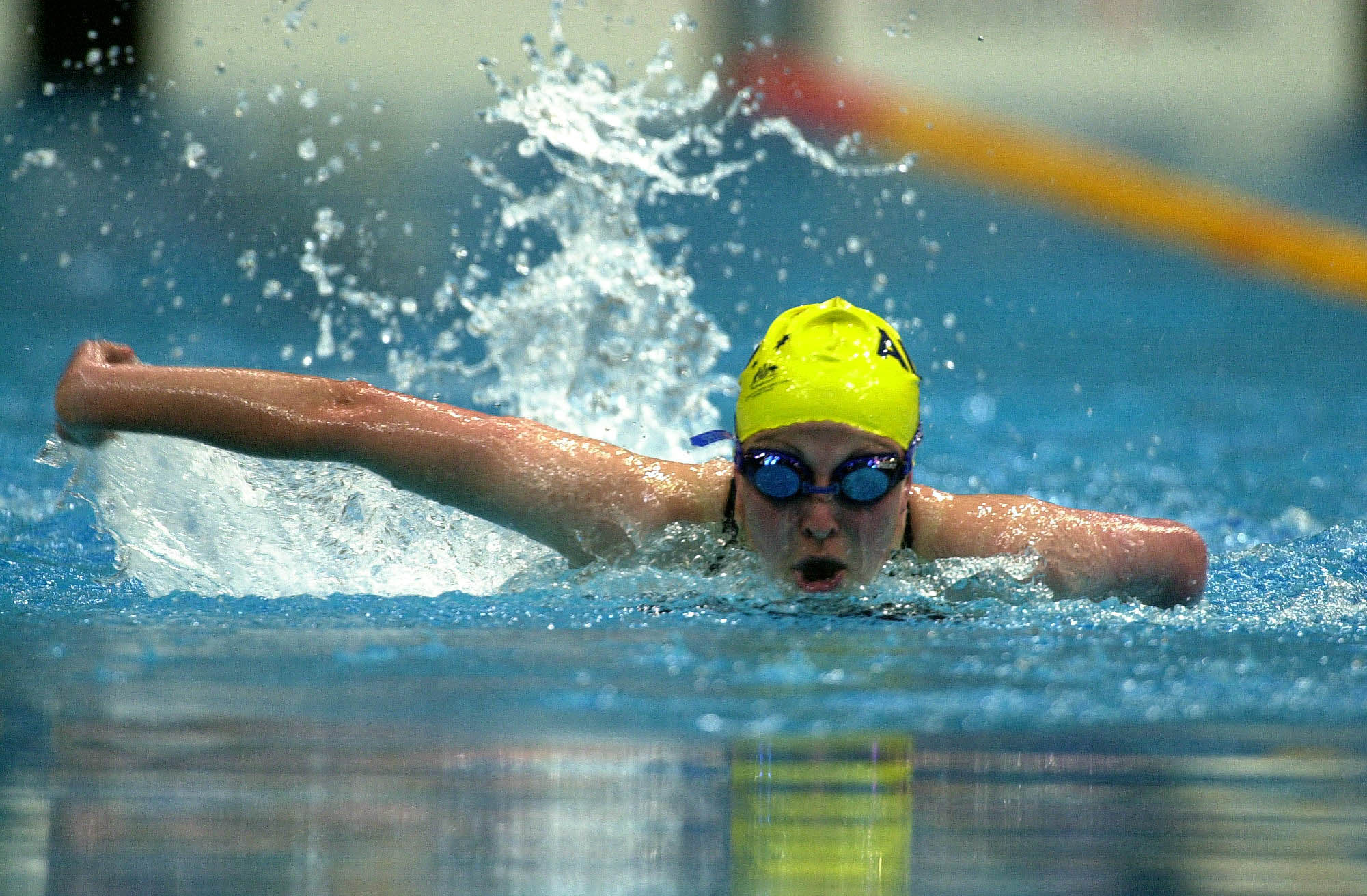
- Action shot of Redford swimming in the 200 m medley SM9 at the 2000 Summer Paralympics

Personal information
- Nationality: Australia
- Born: 10 September 1982 (age 44)
Medal record
Swimming
Paralympic Games
Bronze medal – third place	2000 Sydney	Women's 100 m backstroke S9

Casey Redford (born 10 September 1982) is an Australian Paralympic swimmer. A Victorian Institute of Sport scholarship holder, she won three gold medals at the 1999 FESPIC Games, and a bronze medal at the 2000 Summer Paralympics in Sydney in the Women's 100 m backstroke S9 event.

== Personal ==
Redford was born in Melbourne on 10 September 1982, and was educated at Mentone Girls' Secondary College.

== Competitive swimming ==
Redford was a Victorian Institute of Sport scholarship holder. She competed in the 1998 Australian Swimming Open, representing the Haileybury Waterlion Swimming Club. She competed in the Open 100 m Breaststroke, where she made the finals. She also competed in the Open 100 m Breaststroke, Open 100 m Freestyle, Open 50 m Backstroke and Open 50 m Butterfly, but did not get past the heats. However, she did set a club records for 15-year-olds in the 50 m freestyle (LC) category with a time of 35.08 seconds, in the butterfly event with a personal best with a time of 40.06 seconds, and in the 100 m freestyle event with a time of 1:19.19.

Redford competed at the 1999 FESPIC Games in Thailand, where she won a gold medal in the women's 100m freestyle event, a gold medal in the women's 100m backstroke event, and a gold medal in the women's 200 m individual medley event. On 3 June 2000, Redford set an age group record for 17-year-olds in the 100 m breaststroke event in the SB9 class at a meet in Sheffield, Victoria with a time of 1:35.53. She went on to win a bronze medal at the 2000 Summer Paralympics in Sydney in the women's 100 m backstroke S9 event, with a time of 1:20.02. She also competed in the 200 m individual medley S9 and 100 m breaststroke S9 events, but did not qualify for the finals. In 2001, she competed in the Victorian Swim Championships, coming first in the Multidisability Women's 50 m backstroke event.

== Recognition ==
In 2000, Redford was named on the Victorian School Sports Awards Honour Roll.
