= Shane Walsh (swimmer) =

Australian Paralympic swimmer (born 1976)

Personal information
- Full name: Shane Justin Walsh
- Nationality: Australia
- Born: 16 November 1976 (age 49) Gold Coast, Queensland
Medal record
Swimming
Paralympic Games
Silver medal – second place	2000 Sydney	Men's 4x100 m Freestyle 34 pts

Shane Justin Walsh (born 16 November 1976) is an Australian Paralympic swimmer.

== Biography ==
Walsh was born on 16 November 1976 in the Queensland city of the Gold Coast, where he was raised. He has cerebral palsy. His first international swimming event was the 1999 Bangkok FESPIC Games, where he won a gold medal in the 100 m freestyle and a silver medal in the 50 m freestyle, breaking Australian records in both events; he went on to break three further Australian records in 1999 and 2000. He won a silver medal at the 2000 Sydney Games in the Men's 4 × 100 m Freestyle 34 pts event, came fifth and seventh in the 50 and 100 m freestyle events, respectively, and was entered in the competition but did not start for the 400 m freestyle. His mother Marion Walsh, who had been a platform diving champion for Scotland, died of a heart attack two weeks before the start of the Sydney Paralympics. Money had been raised so that she could travel to see him (and to support Walsh more generally) after a public appeal by their local member of parliament Margaret May. He was an Australian Institute of Sport paralympic swimming scholarship holder in 2000.

After the Games, he managed bars and restaurants across the Gold Coast. In 2008, he took part in Surf Life Saving Queensland's Skills for Life Community Program. He also worked as a physiotherapy assistant in the Gold Coast. He has worked in public health for the Northern Territory government since 2020, becoming a senior men's health coordinator in 2022. An Aboriginal Australian, he specialises in Aboriginal health, which he has studied at the University of Sydney. In 2022, he injured his back while moving a patient and later developed cauda equina syndrome, which he attributed to delays in surgery approval by the workers' compensation company employed by the government of the Northern Territory, Gallagher Bassett, in a 2026 Australian Broadcasting Corporation story about the company.

== Recognition ==
In 2000, Walsh received an Australian Sports Medal.
