= Tamara Nowitzki =

Australian Paralympic swimmer

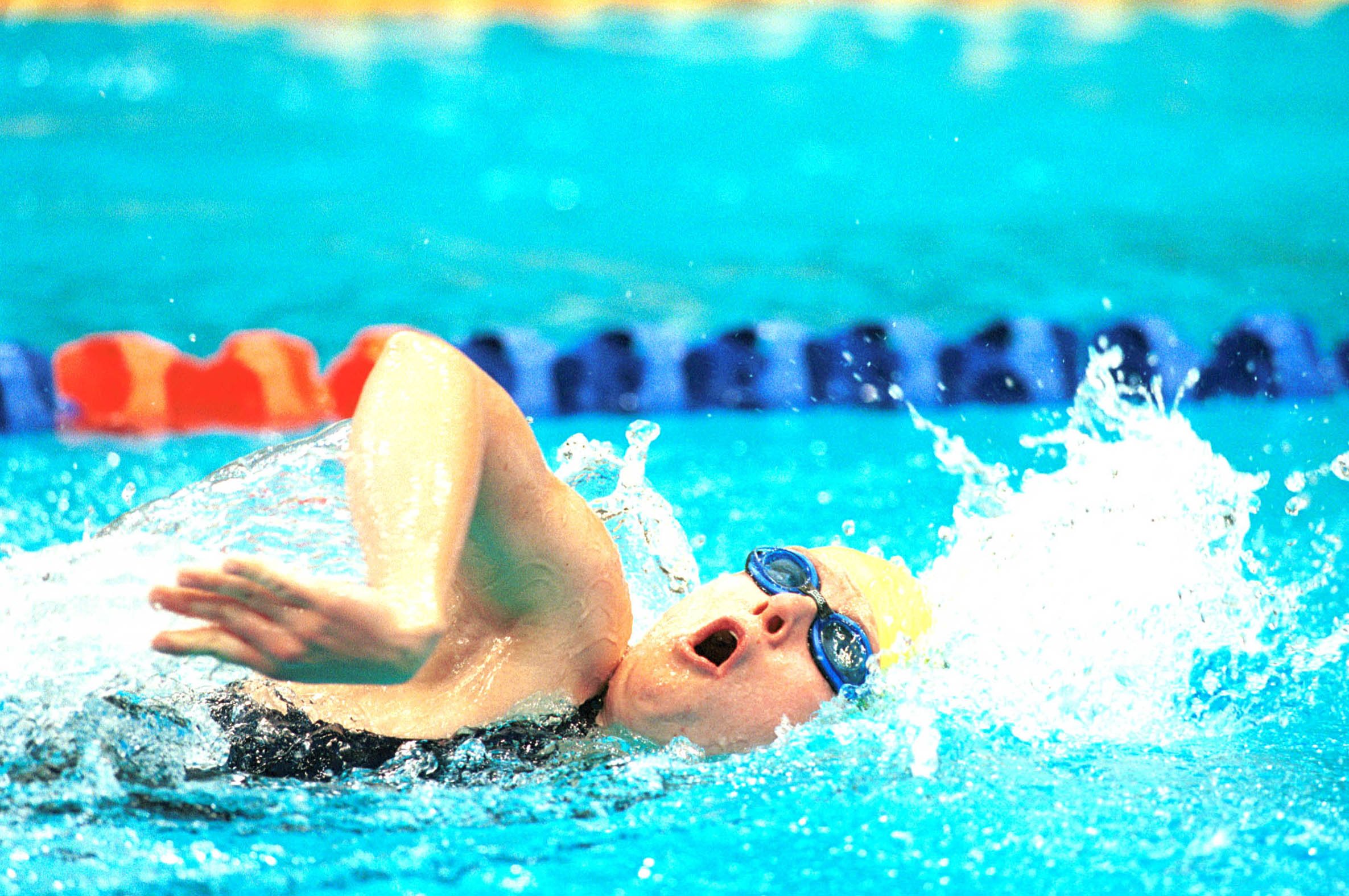
- Action shot of Nowitzki in the pool at the 2000 Summer Paralympics

Personal information
- Nationality: Australia
- Born: 22 May 1976 (age 50) Brisbane, Queensland
Medal record
Swimming
Paralympic Games
Silver medal – second place	2000 Sydney	Women's 100 m Breaststroke SB7
IPC Swimming World Championships
Silver medal – second place	1998 Christchurch	Women's 100 m Breaststroke SB7

Tamara Leigh Nowitzki (born 22 May 1976) is a Paralympic swimming competitor from Australia and a silver medalist at the 2000 Sydney Paralympics.

== Personal ==
She was born in Brisbane. At the age of 13 months she was diagnosed with cerebral palsy. Nowitzki attended Ferny Grove High School. She was diagnosed with Dopa-responsive dystonia when she was 25 years old.

== Career ==
At the 1996 Atlanta Paralympics, she finished fifth in the Women's 100 m Breaststroke SB7. Nowitzki went on to win a silver medal at the 2000 Sydney Games in the Women's 100 m Breaststroke SB7 event. At the 2000 Paralympics she was coached by Brendan Keogh.

== Recognition ==
In 2000, she was awarded the Australian Sports Medal and in 2013 she was recognised at the Dickson Citizen of the Year.

In 2012 Nowitzki released her autobiography 'No Ordinary Girl' to raise awareness of the rare condition Dopa-responsive Dystonia which is often misdiagnosed as cerebral palsy and to reduce the stigma surrounding mental illness.
