= Jason Diederich =

Australian Paralympic swimmer

Personal information
- Nationality: Australian
Medal record
Swimming
Paralympic Games
Silver medal – second place	1992 Barcelona	Men's 100 m Butterfly S10
World Championships and Games for the Disabled
Bronze medal – third place	1990 Assen	Men's 100m Butterfly S10
Bronze medal – third place	1990 Assen	Men's 4 x 100m Freestyle S7

Jason Andrew Diederich is a below-knee amputee Australian Paralympic swimmer. He participated in the 1988 Seoul Paralympics and won a silver medal at the 1992 Barcelona Paralympics in the Men's 100 m Butterfly S10 event. At the age of 23, in 1994 he completed his first solo Rottnest Channel Swim and has undertaken the swim several times since.

Diederich is an occupational therapist and studied at the Curtin University of Technology. He originally lived in Perth, Western Australia and then moved to Canberra, Australian Capital Territory. In 2013, he lived in Melbourne, Victoria and was Executive General Manager, Community Care, Australian Home Care.

In 1992, he was Curtin University of Technology Sports person of the year.
