= 1990 World Championships and Games for the Disabled =

Multi-sport event

1990 World Championships and Games for the Disabled were held in Assen, Netherlands, 14–28 July 1990.

More than 2000 athletes from 48 countries participated in 16 sports. The athletes village was built at one of the Royal Netherlands military bases and it accommodated 1300 beds.

Sports program included: archery, athletics, basketball, boccia, cycling, fencing, judo, powerlifting, shooting, soccer, swimming, table tennis, tennis, weightlifting and wrestling.

The event was discontinued after 1990.
