= Great Britain at the 2004 Summer Paralympics =

- Flag of the United Kingdom
- IPC code: GBR
- NPC: British Paralympic Association
- Website: www.paralympics.org.uk

in Athens
- Competitors: 167 in 15 sports
- Flag bearer: Noel Thatcher
- Medals Ranked 2nd: Gold 35 Silver 30 Bronze 29 Total 94

Summer Paralympics appearances (overview)
- 1960; 1964; 1968; 1972; 1976; 1980; 1984; 1988; 1992; 1996; 2000; 2004; 2008; 2012; 2016; 2020; 2024

Great Britain (the name which the United Kingdom of Great Britain and Northern Ireland competes under at Olympic and Paralympic level) sent a delegation of 166 athletes to the 2004 Summer Paralympics, covering 15 sports. The ParalympicsGB team entered the opening ceremony behind the Union Flag carried by Noel Thatcher.

== Medallists ==
The following British competitors won medals at the Games. In the 'by discipline' sections below, medallists' names are in bold.

Medal	Name	Sport	Event	Date
Gold	John Cavanagh	Archery	Men's Individual W1	25 September
Gold	Anita Chapman MBE; Kathleen Smith; Margaret Parker	Archery	Women's Teams Open	26 September
Gold	Kenny Churchill	Athletics	Men's Javelin F37	27 September
Gold	Danny Crates	Athletics	Men's 800m T46	25 September
Gold	Daniel Greaves	Athletics	Men's Discus Throw F44/46	20 September
Gold	Tanni Grey-Thompson OBE	Athletics	Women's 100m T53	23 September
Gold	Tanni Grey-Thompson OBE	Athletics	Women's 400m T53	27 September
Gold	Stephen Miller	Athletics	Men's Club Throw F32/51	21 September
Gold	Aileen McGlynn; Ellen Hunter	Cycling	Women's Track 1 km Time Trial Tandem B1-3	18 September
Gold	Darren Kenny	Cycling	Men's Track 1 km Time Trial Bicycle CP Div 3/4	18 September
Gold	Darren Kenny	Cycling	Men's Track Individual Pursuit Bicycle CP Div 3	20 September
Gold	Deborah Criddle	Equestrian	Mixed Dressage - Championship Grade III	21 September
Gold	Deborah Criddle	Equestrian	Mixed Dressage - Freestyle Grade III	23 September
Gold	Lee Pearson MBE	Equestrian	Mixed Dressage - Championship Grade I	21 September
Gold	Lee Pearson MBE	Equestrian	Mixed Dressage - Freestyle Grade I	23 September
Gold	Deborah Criddle; Anne Dunham; Lee Pearson MBE; Nicola Tustain	Equestrian	Mixed Dressage Team Open	26 September
Gold	Emma Brown	Powerlifting	Women's -82.5 kg	25 September
Gold	Isabel Newstead MBE	Shooting	Women's Air Pistol SH1	19 September
Gold	James Anderson	Swimming	Men's 50 m Backstroke S2	27 September
Gold	James Anderson	Swimming	Men's 50 m Freestyle S2	25 September
Gold	James Anderson	Swimming	Men's 100 m Freestyle S2	21 September
Gold	James Anderson	Swimming	Men's 200 m Freestyle S2	22 September
Gold	Elaine Barrett	Swimming	Women's 100 m Breaststroke SB11	20 September
Gold	Gareth Duke	Swimming	Men's 100 m Breaststroke SB6	24 September
Gold	Natalie Jones	Swimming	Women's 200 m Individual Medley SM6	19 September
Gold	Sascha Kindred	Swimming	Men's 100 m Breaststroke SB7	21 September
Gold	Sascha Kindred	Swimming	Men's 200 m Individual Medley SM6	19 September
Gold	Nyree Lewis	Swimming	Women's 100 m Backstroke S6	21 September
Gold	Andrew Lindsay	Swimming	Men's 100 m Backstroke S7	22 September
Gold	David Roberts	Swimming	Men's 50 m Freestyle S7	26 September
Gold	David Roberts	Swimming	Men's 100 m Freestyle S7	20 September
Gold	David Roberts	Swimming	Men's 400 m Freestyle S7	23 September
Gold	David Roberts; Matthew Walker; Graham Edmunds; Robert Welbourn; Marc Woods	Swimming	Men's 4 × 100 m Freestyle 34 pts	22 September
Gold	Margaret McEleny MBE; Jane Stidever; Nyree Lewis; Natalie Jones	Swimming	Women's 4x50 m Medley 20 pts	24 September
Gold	Peter Norfolk	Wheelchair tennis	Mixed Singles Quad	26 September
Silver	Deborah Brennan	Athletics	Women's 200 m T34	25 September
Silver	Hazel Robson	Athletics	Women's 100 m T36	22 September
Silver	Hazel Robson	Athletics	Women's 200 m T36	26 September
Silver	David Weir	Athletics	Men's 100 m T54	26 September
Silver	Dan West	Athletics	Men's Discus Throw F33-34	20 September
Silver	Aileen McGlynn; Ellen Hunter	Cycling	Women's Track Sprint Tandem B1-3	20 September
Silver	Darren Kenny	Cycling	Men's Road Road Race / Time Trial Bicycle CP Div 3	27 September
Silver	Ian Rose	Judo	Men's +100 kg	20 September
Silver	Sarah Bailey MBE	Swimming	Women's 100 m Breaststroke SB9	22 September
Silver	Sarah Bailey MBE	Swimming	Women's 200 m Individual Medley SM10	23 September
Silver	James Crisp	Swimming	Men's 100 m Backstroke S9	25 September
Silver	James Crisp	Swimming	Men's 100 m Breaststroke SB8	21 September
Silver	James Crisp	Swimming	Men's 400 m Freestyle S9	24 September
Silver	Elizabeth Johnson	Swimming	Women's 100 m Breaststroke SB6	24 September
Silver	Nyree Lewis	Swimming	Women's 100 m Breaststroke SB5	24 September
Silver	Nyree Lewis	Swimming	Women's 200 m Individual Medley SM6	19 September
Silver	Mhairi Love	Swimming	Women's 400 m Freestyle S6	26 September
Silver	Margaret McEleny MBE	Swimming	Women's 50 m Breaststroke SB3	23 September
Silver	Margaret McEleny MBE	Swimming	Women's 150 m Individual Medley SM4	26 September
Silver	David Roberts	Swimming	Men's 200 m Individual Medley SM7	19 September
Silver	Anthony Stephens	Swimming	Men's 200 m Freestyle S5	21 September
Silver	Matthew Walker	Swimming	Men's 50 m Freestyle S7	26 September
Silver	Matthew Walker	Swimming	Men's 100 m Freestyle S7	20 September
Silver	Danielle Watts	Swimming	Women's 100 m Freestyle S2	21 September
Silver	Robert Welbourn	Swimming	Men's 400 m Freestyle S10	24 September
Silver	Fran Williamson	Swimming	Women's 50 m Backstroke S3	27 September
Silver	Fran Williamson	Swimming	Women's 50 m Freestyle S3	25 September
Silver	Jane Stidever; Fran Williamson; Mhairi Love; Jeanette Chippington	Swimming	Women's 4x50 m Freestyle 20 pts	24 September
Silver	James Rawson; Neil Robinson; Stefan Trofan	Table Tennis	Men's Teams 3	
Silver	Mark Eccleston; Peter Norfolk	Wheelchair tennis	Mixed Doubles Quad	26 September
Bronze	Graeme Ballard	Athletics	Men's 200 m T36	26 September
Bronze	Deborah Brennan	Athletics	Women's 100 m T34	22 September
Bronze	David Gale	Athletics	Men's Discus Throw F32/51	24 September
Bronze	Stephen Payton	Athletics	Men's 400 m T38	27 September
Bronze	Lloyd Upsdell	Athletics	Men's 200 m T35	26 September
Bronze	David Weir	Athletics	Men's 200 m T54	21 September
Bronze	Paul Hunter; Ian Sharpe	Cycling	Men's Track Individual Pursuit Tandem B1-3	19 September
Bronze	Paul Hunter; Ian Sharpe	Cycling	Men's Track 1 km Time Trial Tandem B1-3	22 September
Bronze	Sophie Christiansen	Equestrian	Mixed Dressage - Championship Grade I	21 September
Bronze	Nicola Tustain	Equestrian	Mixed Dressage - Championship Grade II	22 September
Bronze	Nicola Tustain	Equestrian	Mixed Dressage - Freestyle Grade II	24 September
Bronze	Sarah Bailey MBE	Swimming	Women's 100 m Freestyle S10	21 September
Bronze	Claire Cashmore	Swimming	Women's 100 m Backstroke S9	25 September
Bronze	Claire Cashmore	Swimming	Women's 200 m Individual Medley SM9	23 September
Bronze	James Crisp	Swimming	Men's 200 m Individual Medley SM9	23 September
Bronze	Jody Cundy	Swimming	Men's 100 m Butterfly S10	20 September
Bronze	Rhiannon Henry	Swimming	Women's 100 m Butterfly S13	19 September
Bronze	Rhiannon Henry	Swimming	Women's 400 m Freestyle S13	20 September
Bronze	Dervis Konuralp	Swimming	Men's 200 m Individual Medley SM13	24 September
Bronze	Nyree Lewis	Swimming	Women's 400 m Freestyle S6	26 September
Bronze	Giles Long	Swimming	Men's 100 m Butterfly S8	19 September
Bronze	Anthony Stephens	Swimming	Men's 50 m Freestyle S5	27 September
Bronze	Anthony Stephens	Swimming	Men's 100 m Freestyle S5	19 September
Bronze	Danielle Watts	Swimming	Women's 50 m Backstroke S2	27 September
Bronze	Danielle Watts	Swimming	Women's 50 m Freestyle S2	25 September
Bronze	Fran Williamson	Swimming	Women's 100 m Freestyle S3	19 September
Bronze	Kenneth Cairns; Gareth Duke; Anthony Stephens; Sascha Kindred	Swimming	Men's 4x50 m Freestyle 20 pts	24 September
Bronze	Catherine Mitton	Table Tennis	Women's Singles 1-2	
Bronze	Ade Adepitan; Andy Blake; Matt Byrne; Terry Bywater; Pete Finbow; Kevin Hayes; Fred Howley; Stuart Jellows; Simon Munn; Jon Pollock; Colin Price; Sinclair Thomas	Wheelchair Basketball	Men's Tournament	28 September

=== Medals by sport ===
Medals by Sport
**Sport**	Gold medal	Silver medal	Bronze medal	Total
Swimming	16	20	16	52
Athletics	6	5	6	17
Equestrian	5	0	3	8
Cycling	3	2	2	7
Archery	2	0	0	2
Wheelchair Tennis	1	1	0	2
Powerlifting	1	0	0	1
Shooting	1	0	0	1
Table tennis	0	1	1	2
Judo	0	1	0	1
Wheelchair Basketball	0	0	1	1
**Total**	**35**	**30**	**29**	**94**

=== Medals by date ===
**Medals by date**
**Day**	**Date**	Gold medal	Silver medal	Bronze medal	Total
1	18 Sept	2	0	0	2
2	19 Sept	3	2	5	10
3	20 Sept	4	4	2	10
4	21 Sept	6	3	3	12
5	22 Sept	3	2	3	8
6	23 Sept	4	2	2	8
7	24 Sept	2	5	4	11
8	25 Sept	4	3	2	9
9	26 Sept	4	6	3	13
10	27 Sept	3	2	3	9
11	28 Sept	0	0	1	1
Unknown		0	1	1	2
**Total**		**35**	**30**	**29**	**94**

=== Medals by gender ===
**Medals by gender**^{(Comparison graphs)}
**Gender**	Gold medal	Silver medal	Bronze medal	**Total**	**Percentage**
Male	22	14	15	51	54.3%
Female	12	16	14	42	44.7%
Mixed	1	0	0	1	1.1%
**Total**	**35**	**30**	**29**	94	**100%**

=== Multiple medallists ===
The following competitors won multiple medals at the 2004 Paralympic Games.

Name	Medal	Sport	Events
David Roberts	Gold; Gold; Gold; Gold; Silver	Swimming	Men's 50 m Freestyle S7; Men's 100 m Freestyle S7; Men's 400 m Freestyle S7; Men's 4 × 100 m Freestyle 34 pts Men's 200 m Individual Medley SM7
James Anderson	Gold; Gold; Gold; Gold	Swimming	Men's 50 m Backstroke S2; Men's 50 m Freestyle S2; Men's 100 m Freestyle S2; Men's 200 m Freestyle S2
Deborah Criddle	Gold; Gold; Gold	Equestrian	Mixed Dressage - Championship Grade III; Mixed Dressage - Freestyle Grade III; Mixed Dressage Team Open
Lee Pearson MBE	Gold; Gold; Gold	Equestrian	Mixed Dressage - Championship Grade I Mixed Dressage - Freestyle Grade I Mixed Dressage Team Open
Nyree Lewis	Gold; Gold; Silver; Silver; Bronze	Swimming	Women's 100 m Backstroke S6; Women's 4x50 m Medley 20 pts Women's 100 m Breaststroke SB5; Women's 200 m Individual Medley SM6; Women's 400 m Freestyle S6
Darren Kenny	Gold; Gold; Silver	Cycling	Men's Track 1 km Time Trial Bicycle CP Div 3/4; Men's Track Individual Pursuit Bicycle CP Div 3 Men's Road Road Race / Time Trial Bicycle CP Div 3
Sascha Kindred	Gold; Gold; Bronze	Swimming	Men's 100 m Breaststroke SB7; Men's 200 m Individual Medley SM6; Men's 4x50 m Freestyle 20 pts
Tanni Grey-Thompson OBE	Gold; Gold	Athletics	Women's 100m T53; Women's 400m T53
Natalie Jones	Gold; Gold	Swimming	Women's 200 m Individual Medley SM6; Women's 4x50 m Medley 20 pts
Margaret McEleny MBE	Gold; Silver; Silver	Swimming	Women's 4x50 m Medley 20 pts Women's 50 m Breaststroke SB3; Women's 150 m Individual Medley SM4
Matthew Walker	Gold; Silver; Silver	Swimming	Men's 4 × 100 m Freestyle 34 pts Men's 50 m Freestyle S7; Men's 100 m Freestyle S7
Aileen McGlynn	Gold; Silver	Cycling	Women's Track 1 km Time Trial Tandem B1-3; Women's Track Sprint Tandem B1-3
Ellen Hunter	Gold; Silver	Cycling	Women's Track 1 km Time Trial Tandem B1-3; Women's Track Sprint Tandem B1-3
Peter Norfolk	Gold; Silver	Wheelchair Tennis	Mixed Singles Quad; Mixed Doubles Quad
Jane Stidever	Gold; Silver	Swimming	Women's 4x50 m Medley 20 pts Women's 4x50 m Freestyle 20 pts
Robert Welbourn	Gold; Silver	Swimming	Men's 4 × 100 m Freestyle 34 pts Men's 400 m Freestyle S10
Nicola Tustain	Gold; Bronze; Bronze	Equestrian	Mixed Dressage Team Open; Mixed Dressage - Championship Grade II; Mixed Dressage - Freestyle Grade II
Gareth Duke	Gold; Bronze	Swimming	Men's 100 m Breaststroke SB6; Men's 4x50 m Freestyle 20 pts
James Crisp	Silver; Silver; Silver; Bronze	Swimming	Men's 100 m Backstroke S9; Men's 100 m Breaststroke SB8; Men's 400 m Freestyle S9; Men's 200 m Individual Medley SM9
Fran Williamson	Silver; Silver; Silver; Bronze	Swimming	Women's 50 m Backstroke S3; Women's 50 m Freestyle S3; Women's 4x50 m Freestyle 20 pts Women's 100 m Freestyle S3
Sarah Bailey MBE	Silver; Silver; Bronze	Swimming	Women's 100 m Breaststroke SB9; Women's 200 m Individual Medley SM10; Women's 100 m Freestyle S10
Mhairi Love	Silver; Silver	Swimming	Women's 400 m Freestyle S6; Women's 4x50 m Freestyle 20 pts
Hazel Robson	Silver; Silver	Athletics	Women's 100 m T36; Women's 200 m T36
Anthony Stephens	Silver; Bronze; Bronze; Bronze	Swimming	Men's 200 m Freestyle S5; Men's 50 m Freestyle S5; Men's 100 m Freestyle S5; Men's 4x50 m Freestyle 20 pts
Danielle Watts	Silver; Bronze; Bronze	Swimming	Women's 100 m Freestyle S2; Women's 50 m Backstroke S2; Women's 50 m Freestyle S2
Deborah Brennan	Silver; Bronze	Athletics	Women's 200 m T34; Women's 100 m T34
David Weir	Silver; Bronze	Athletics	Men's 100 m T54; Men's 200 m T54
Claire Cashmore	Bronze; Bronze	Swimming	Women's 100 m Backstroke S9; Women's 200 m Individual Medley SM9
Rhiannon Henry	Bronze; Bronze	Swimming	Women's 100 m Butterfly S13; Women's 400 m Freestyle S13
Paul Hunter	Bronze; Bronze	Cycling	Men's Track Individual Pursuit Tandem B1-3; Men's Track 1 km Time Trial Tandem B1-3
Ian Sharpe	Bronze; Bronze	Cycling	Men's Track Individual Pursuit Tandem B1-3; Men's Track 1 km Time Trial Tandem B1-3

== Archery ==
=== Men ===
Athlete	Event	Ranking round		Round of 32	Round of 16	Quarterfinals	Semifinals	Finals	
Athlete	Event	Score	Rank	Opposition Result	Opposition Result	Opposition Result	Opposition Result	Opposition Result	Rank
Andrew Baylis	Men's Individual W2	610	10	Martsuri (THA); W 155–140	Lee (KOR); L 141–146	Did not advance			
James Buchanan	Men's Individual W2	586	19	Marin (ESP); L 131–140	Did not advance				
John Cavanagh	Men's Individual W1	624	5	—N/a	Cassiani (ITA); W 164–114	Hatem (FRA); W 102–93	Fabry (USA); W 108–108 {2} wins by tie break: 9:6	Groenberg (SWE); W 108–102	1st place, gold medalist(s)
Alexander Gregory	Men's Individual W2	601	12	Kehtari (IRI); W 141–135	Jung (KOR); L 149–161	Did not advance			
Paul Hawthorne	Men's Individual Standing	530	21	Zarzuela (ESP); L 136–151	Did not advance				
Andrew Baylis; John Cavanagh; Alexander Gregory	Men's Team Open	1835	4	—N/a	Bye	Poland (POL); W 221–209	South Korea (KOR); L 231–236	Bronze; United States (USA); L 212–231	4

=== Women ===
Athlete	Event	Ranking round		Round of 16	Quarterfinals	Semifinals	Finals	
Athlete	Event	Score	Rank	Opposition Result	Opposition Result	Opposition Result	Opposition Result	Rank
Anita Chapman MBE	Women's Individual Standing	554	5	Karpmaichan (THA); L 108–132	Did not advance			
Margaret Parker	Women's Individual W1/W2	534	11	Sidkova (CZE); L 121–140	Did not advance			
Kathleen Smith	Women's Individual W1/W2	545	8	Kuncova (CZE); W 147–126	Hirasawa (JPN); L 95–96	Did not advance		
Anita Chapman MBE; Margaret Parker; Kathleen Smith	Women's Teams Open	1633	4	—N/a	Poland (POL); W 210–168	Japan (JPN); W 197–191	Italy (ITA); W 184–157	1st place, gold medalist(s)

Legend: WR – World record; W – Won; L – Lost; N/A – Round not applicable for the event;

== Athletics ==
Key

- Note – Ranks given for track events are within the athlete's heat only
- Q = Qualified for the next round
- q = Qualified for the next round as a fastest loser
- WR = World record
- PR = Paralympic record
- EU = European record
- NR = National record
- N/A = Round not applicable for the event
- Bye = Athlete not required to compete in round
- DNS = Did not start
- DNF = Did not finish
- DQ = Disqualified

=== Men—Track ===
Athlete	Events	Heat		Semifinal		Final	
Athlete	Events	Time	Rank	Time	Rank	Time	Rank
Graeme Ballard	100 m T36	—N/a		12.73	1 Q	12.81	6
Graeme Ballard	200 m T36	—N/a				25.78	3rd place, bronze medalist(s)
Mark Brown	5000 m T46	—N/a				15:21.56	5
Stephen Cooper	800 m T37	—N/a		2:16.11	3 Q	2.12.62	4
Danny Crates	800 m T46	—N/a		1:58.48	1 Q	1:57.89	1st place, gold medalist(s)
Mark Farnell	Marathon T13	—N/a				2:57:16	12
David Holding	100 m T54	14.22	2 q	14.52	2 Q	14.58	4
David Holding	200 m T54	—N/a		25.81	2 Q	26.43	8
Steven Leigh	800 m T38	—N/a				2:18.75	7
Robert Matthews MBE	5000 m T11	—N/a				16:20.51	6
Robert Matthews MBE	10000 m T11	—N/a				34:47.66	5
Stephen Payton	100 m T38	—N/a		11.92	3 Q	11.76	5
Stephen Payton	200 m T38	—N/a		25.11	3 Q	24.45	8
Stephen Payton	400 m T38	—N/a		53.64	3 Q	52.32	3rd place, bronze medalist(s)
Paul Pearce	Marathon T13	—N/a				2:46:20	6
Noel Thatcher MBE	5000 m T12	—N/a				15:16.59	4
Noel Thatcher MBE	10000 m T12	—N/a				32:20.76	4
Lloyd Upsdell	100 m T35	—N/a		13.70	3 Q	13.61	4
Lloyd Upsdell	200 m T35	—N/a				27.82	3rd place, bronze medalist(s)
Dave Weir	100 m T54	14.17 PR	1 Q	14.31	1 Q	14.31	2nd place, silver medalist(s)
Dave Weir	200 m T54	—N/a		25.43	2 Q	25.55	3rd place, bronze medalist(s)
Dave Weir	400 m T54	—N/a		49.26	3	Did not advance	
Darren Westlake	1500 m T13	—N/a		4:03.67	3 Q	4:10.64	11
Richard White	100 m T35	—N/a		14.26	3 Q	14.15	6
Richard White	200 m T35	—N/a				DNF	

=== Men-field ===
Athlete	Events	Result	Points	Rank
Kenny Churchill	Javelin F37	48.09 m WR	-	1st place, gold medalist(s)
Dave Gale	Discus Throw F32/51	9.41 m	1042	3rd place, bronze medalist(s)
Dan Greaves	Discus Throw F44/46	55.12 m WR	1102	1st place, gold medalist(s)
Christopher Martin	Discus Throw F33-34	28.16 m PR	869	4
Stephen Miller	Club Throw F32/51	33.53 m WR	1133	1st place, gold medalist(s)
Richard Schabel	Discus Throw F32/51	9.20 m	1019	4
Dan West	Shot Put F33-34	10.16 m	961	4
Dan West	Discus Throw F33-34	36.76 m	867	2nd place, silver medalist(s)
Andrew Williams	Shot Put F32	6.49 m	-	4
Paul Williams	Shot Put F35	11.59 m	-	5

=== Women—Track ===
Athlete	Events	Heat		Semifinal		Final	
Athlete	Events	Time	Rank	Time	Rank	Time	Rank
Debbie Brennan	100 m T34	—N/a				20.23	3rd place, bronze medalist(s)
Debbie Brennan	200 m T34	—N/a				35.39	2nd place, silver medalist(s)
Tanni Grey-Thompson OBE	100 m T53	—N/a				17.24	1st place, gold medalist(s)
Tanni Grey-Thompson OBE	200 m T54	—N/a		30.75	2 Q	30.54	4
Tanni Grey-Thompson OBE	400 m T53	—N/a		58.09	1 Q	57.36 PR	1st place, gold medalist(s)
Tanni Grey-Thompson OBE	800 m T53	—N/a		1:57.11 Q	2	2:03.11	7
Tracey Hinton	400 m T12	1:01.38	1 Q	1:00.25	3	Final B DNS	
Tracey Hinton	800 m T12	—N/a		2:22.71 Q	1	2:19.29	4
Karen Lewis-Archer	200 m T52	—N/a		43.11	5 q	44.98	7
Karen Lewis-Archer	400 m T52	—N/a		1:27.46	5	Did not advance	
Rachel Potter	200 m T54	—N/a		32.41	2	Did not advance	
Rachel Potter	400 m T54	—N/a		1:01.23	2	1:00.46	8
Hazel Robson	100 m T36	—N/a				15.31	2nd place, silver medalist(s)
Hazel Robson	200 m T36	—N/a				31.98	2nd place, silver medalist(s)

=== Women-field ===
Athlete	Events	Result	Points	Rank
Beverley Jones	Shot Put F37/38	10.21 m	1019	4
Pauline Latto	Javelin F35-38	19.49 m	878	11
Kim Minett	Shot Put F40	6.69 m	-	4
Kim Minett	Discus Throw F40	15.02 m	717	7
Sally Reddin	Shot Put F54/55	5.96 m	980	4
Claire Williams	Discus Throw F13	35.26 m	-	5

- Jenny Ridley - withdrew after being reclassified from T52 to T53

== Boccia ==
Key

- Note – Ranks given in preliminary matches are the athlete's pool only
- Q = Qualified for the next round
- q = Qualified for the next round as having a best score of those not in the top two in the pool
- WR = World record
- PR = Paralympic record
- EU = European record
- NR = National record
- N/A = Round not applicable for the event
- Bye = Athlete not required to compete in round
- DNS = Did not start
- DNF = Did not finish
- DQ = Disqualified

Athlete	Event	Preliminary matches		1/8th Finals	Quarterfinals	Semifinals	Final	
Athlete	Event	Opposition Result	Rank	Opposition Result	Opposition Result	Opposition Result	Opposition Result	Rank
Nigel Murray	Mixed individual BC2	Hayes (IRL); W 8–1 Femtegield (NOR); W 5–0; Tsilikopoulou (GRE); W 6–0 DNS	1 Q	Mongkolpun (THA); W 5–1	Cordero (THA); L 1–6	Did not advance		
Peter Pearse	Mixed individual BC1	Beltran (ESP); L 3–5 Taksee (THA); L 1–7; Shelly (IRL); L 3–7; Villano (ARG); W 7–2; Gahleitner (AUT); W 11–0	4	Did not advance				
Susie Robinson	Mixed individual BC1	Sanders (NZL); L 3–6 Fernandez (POR); L 5–6; Prossegger (AUT); L 2–3; Vanhoek (CAN); L 5–7; Cid (ESP); W 6–0	4	Did not advance				
Anne Woffinden	Mixed individual BC2	Flood (NZL); L 1–4 Goncalves (POR); L 1–7; Morriss (NZL); W 9–1	3	Did not advance				
Nigel Murray; Peter Pearse; Susie Robinson; Anne Woffinden	Mixed team BC1-2	Spain (ESP); L 1–13 Austria (AUT); W 11–1; Argentina (ARG); W 9–0; Canada (CAN); W 7–5; Norway (NOR); W 6–5	2 Q	N/A		Portugal (POR); L 8–9	Spain (ESP); L 5–7	4

== Cycling ==
=== Road cycling ===
Athlete	Event	Time	Points	Rank
Darren Kenny	Men's Road Race / Time Trial Bicycle CP Div 3	1:18.04	3	Silver medal
Ian Sharpe; Paul Hunter	Men's Road Race / Time Trial Tandem B1-3	3:10.00	24	13
Gary Rosbotham-Williams	Men's Road Race / Time Trial Bicycle LC1	2:39.05	15	5

=== Track cycling ===
Athlete	Event	Qualification		Classification		Quarterfinal		Semifinal		Final	
Athlete	Event	Time	Rank	Opposition Time	Rank	Opposition Time	Rank	Opposition Time	Rank	Opposition Time	Rank
Dan Gordon; Barney Storey (pilot)	Men's Sprint Tandem B1-3	10.991 AT	4 Q	5-8; Germany (GER); L	7-8	Japan (JPN); L-11.612, 11.553-L, DNF-W; L	6	Did not advance			
Dan Gordon; Barney Storey (pilot)	Men's 1 km Time Trial Tandem B1-3	—N/a								1:06.645 AT	5
Ian Sharpe; Paul Hunter (pilot)	Men's 1 km Time Trial Tandem B1-3	—N/a								1:05.530 AT	3rd place, bronze medalist(s)
Ian Sharpe; Paul Hunter (pilot)	Men's Individual Pursuit Tandem B1-3	—N/a				4:33.676 AT	3 Q	Canada (CAN); W OVL 4:29.345 AT	3 q	Bronze Final; Canada (CAN); W 4:35.595 AT	3rd place, bronze medalist(s)
Darren Kenny	Men's Track 1 km Time Trial Bicycle CP Div 3/4	—N/a								1:08.196 FT WR	1st place, gold medalist(s)
Darren Kenny	Men's Individual Pursuit Bicycle CP Div 3	—N/a				3:59.188 AT	2 Q	—N/a		Otxoa (ESP); W 3:46.260 AT WR	1st place, gold medalist(s)
Aileen McGlynn; Ellen Hunter	Women's 1 km Time Trial Tandem B1-3	—N/a								1:11.160 WR	1st place, gold medalist(s)
Aileen McGlynn; Ellen Hunter	Women's Sprint Tandem B1-3	11.939	3 Q	Bye		—N/a		United States (USA); 13.117-L, 14.363-L; W	2 Q	Australia (AUS); L-13.174, L-12.819; L	2nd place, silver medalist(s)

Key

- AT = actual time
- FT = factor time
- OVL = Win by overtaking
- Q = Qualified for next round
- ql = Qualified for lower round
- WR = World record

== Equestrian ==
=== Individual events ===
Athlete	Event	Total	
Athlete	Event	Score	Rank
Sophie Christiansen	Mixed Dressage Championship Grade I	70.000	Bronze medal
Sophie Christiansen	Mixed Dressage Freestyle Grade I	73.250	4
Deborah Criddle	Mixed Dressage Championship Grade III	74.400	Gold medal
Deborah Criddle	Mixed Dressage Freestyle Grade III	81.722	Gold medal
Michelle Crunkhorn	Mixed Dressage Championship Grade IV	64.258	9
Michelle Crunkhorn	Mixed Dressage Freestyle Grade IV	67.818	10
Anne Dunham	Mixed Dressage Championship Grade I	67.895	6
Anne Dunham	Mixed Dressage Freestyle Grade I	71.125	5
Lee Pearson MBE	Mixed Dressage Championship Grade I	77.263	Gold medal
Lee Pearson MBE	Mixed Dressage Freestyle Grade I	87.000	Gold medal
Jo Pitt	Mixed Dressage Championship Grade II	67.091	8
Jo Pitt	Mixed Dressage Freestyle Grade II	70.444	10
Nicola Tustain	Mixed Dressage Championship Grade II	68.727	Bronze medal
Nicola Tustain	Mixed Dressage Freestyle Grade II	75.000	Bronze medal

=== Team ===
Athlete	Event	Total	
Athlete	Event	Score	Rank
Deborah Criddle; Anne Dunham; Lee Pearson MBE; Nicola Tustain	Team	444.866	1st place, gold medalist(s)

=== Reserves ===
- Ricky Balshaw (grade II)

== Judo ==
Athlete	Event	Preliminary	Quarterfinals	Semifinals	Repechage round 1	Repechage round 2	Final/ Bronze medal contest	Rank
Athlete	Event	Opposition Result	Opposition Result	Opposition Result	Opposition Result	Opposition Result	Opposition Result	Rank
Darren Kail	Men's 66kg	Fujimoto (JPN); L 0000-0051	Did not advance		Viera (URU); W 0200-0000	Kallunki (FIN); L 0001-1000	Did not advance	
Simon Jackson MBE	Men's 73kg	Sydronenko (UKR); L 0001-0010	Did not advance					
Ian Rose	Men's +100kg	Bye	Looi (MAS); W 1000-0000	Akaev (RUS); W 0201S - 0001K	—N/a		Zakiyev (AZE); L 0000-1000	2nd place, silver medalist(s)
Maxine Ingram	Women's 63kg	—N/a		Huettler (GER); L 0000-1000	—N/a		Quessandier (FRA); L 0000-1000	

== Powerlifting ==
Athlete	Event	Result	Rank
Jason Irving	Men's 60 kg	165.0	5
Anthony Peddle	Men's 48 kg	NMR	
Natalie Blake	Women's 56 kg	87.5	4
Emma Brown	Women's 82.5kg	130.0	1st place, gold medalist(s)
Julie Salmon	Women's 48 kg	72.5	7

== Sailing ==
Athlete(s)	Event	Total points	Rank
Allan Smith	Mixed Single Person 2.4mr	54.0	8
Stephen Thomas; John Robertson; Hannah Stodel; Helena Lucas (reserve)	Mixed Three Person Sonar	49.0	6

== Shooting ==
Athlete	Event	Qualification		Final		
Athlete	Event	Score	Rank	Score	Total	Rank
Deanna Coates	Women's Air Rifle Standing SH1	386	5 Q	96.6	482.6	7
Isabel Newstead MBE	Women's Air Pistol SH1	371	1 Q	95.8	466.8	1st place, gold medalist(s)
Claire Priest	Mixed Air Rifle Prone SH1	589	43	Did not advance		

== Swimming ==
=== Men ===
Athlete	Class	Event	Heats		Final	
Athlete	Class	Event	Result	Rank	Result	Rank
James Anderson	S2	50m backstroke	1:10.01	2 Q	1:05.51	1st place, gold medalist(s)
James Anderson	S2	50m freestyle	1:09.06	1 Q	1:06.87	1st place, gold medalist(s)
James Anderson	S2	100m freestyle	2:21.67	1 Q	2:21.49	1st place, gold medalist(s)
James Anderson	S2	200m freestyle	5:21.39 PR	1 Q	4:49.81 WR	1st place, gold medalist(s)
Kenneth Cairns	S3	50m freestyle	55.09	4	54.18	6
Kenneth Cairns	S3	100m freestyle	2:06.21	8 Q	1:57.30	5
Kenneth Cairns	S3	200m freestyle	4:08.14 PR	1 Q	4:08.40	5
James Crisp	S9	50m freestyle	29.45	7	Did not advance	
James Crisp	S9	100m backstroke	1:06.68	2 Q	1:05.42	2nd place, silver medalist(s)
James Crisp	S9	100m butterfly	1:06.06	7 Q	1:06.87	8
James Crisp	S9	400m freestyle	4:35.56	2 Q	4:28.38	2nd place, silver medalist(s)
James Crisp	SB8	100m breaststroke	1:20.35	4 Q	1:19.47	2nd place, silver medalist(s)
James Crisp	SM9	200m individual medley	2:26.27	1 Q	2:24.88	3rd place, bronze medalist(s)
Jody Cundy	S10	50m freestyle	27.14	7	Did not advance	
Jody Cundy	S10	100m backstroke	1:08.12	4 Q	1:07.61	5
Jody Cundy	S10	100m butterfly	1:01.65	4 Q	1:01.02	3rd place, bronze medalist(s)
Gareth Duke	S6	100m freestyle	1:18.20	13	Did not advance	
Gareth Duke	SB6	100m breaststroke	N/A		1:29.93 PR	1st place, gold medalist(s)
Graham Edmunds	S10	50m freestyle	26.27	4	26.23	6
Graham Edmunds	S10	100m freestyle	58.33	11	Did not advance	
David Hill	S9	100m backstroke	1:09.73	7 Q	1:10.13	8
David Hill	SM9	200m individual medley	2:39.47	11	Did not advance	
Sascha Kindred	SM6	200m individual medley	2:56.09 PR	1 Q	2:51.39 PR	1st place, gold medalist(s)
Sascha Kindred	SB7	100m breaststroke	1:24.51 PR	1 Q	1:23.28 PR	1st place, gold medalist(s)
Dervis Konuralp	S13	50m freestyle	26.95	4	26.72	7
Dervis Konuralp	S13	100m butterfly	1:04.46	5 Q	1:04.34	6
Dervis Konuralp	S13	100m freestyle	1:00.23	7 Q	1:01.09	7
Dervis Konuralp	SM13	200m individual medley	2:29.95	2 Q	2:26.59	3rd place, bronze medalist(s)
Callum Lawson	SB9	100m breaststroke	1:18.22	11	Did not advance	
Darren Leach	S12	50m freestyle	26.28	3	26.08	6
Darren Leach	SB12	100m breaststroke	1:17.76	10	Did not advance	
Darren Leach	SM12	200m individual medley	2:33.77	11	Did not advance	
Andrew Lindsay	S7	50m freestyle	31.06	5	Did not advance	
Andrew Lindsay	S7	100m backstroke	1:15.49 PR	1 Q	1:16.67	1st place, gold medalist(s)
Andrew Lindsay	S7	400m freestyle	5:09.07	2 Q	5:10.60	5
Andrew Lindsay	SM7	200m individual medley	3:04.59	10	Did not advance	
Giles Long	S8	100m butterfly	1:07.61 PR	2 Q	1:07.12	3rd place, bronze medalist(s)
Giles Long	S8	100m freestyle	1:07.32	11	Did not advance	
David Roberts	S7	50m freestyle	29.43	1 Q	28.77	Gold medal
David Roberts	S7	100m backstroke	1:21.32	6 Q	1:18.81	4
David Roberts	S7	100m freestyle	1:03.13 PR	1 Q	1:01.65 WR	1st place, gold medalist(s)
David Roberts	S7	400m freestyle	5:03.93	1 Q	4:56.11	1st place, gold medalist(s)
David Roberts	SM7	200m individual medley	2:50.48	3 Q	2:47.03	2nd place, silver medalist(s)
Anthony Stephens	S5	50m backstroke	43.60	6 Q	43.45	7
Anthony Stephens	S5	50m freestyle	36.54	3 Q	35.65	3rd place, bronze medalist(s)
Anthony Stephens	S5	100m freestyle	1:19.21	2 Q	1:17.62	3rd place, bronze medalist(s)
Anthony Stephens	S5	200m freestyle	2:47.93 PR	1 Q	2:45.84	2nd place, silver medalist(s)
Anthony Stephens	SM5	200m individual medley	3:33.07	5 Q	3:26.64	5
Matthew Walker	S7	50m freestyle	29.58	2 Q	28.80	2nd place, silver medalist(s)
Matthew Walker	S7	100m freestyle	1:04.28	2 Q	1:04.22	2nd place, silver medalist(s)
Matthew Walker	SB7	100m breaststroke	1:30.30	7 Q	DSQ	
Matthew Walker	SM7	200m individual medley	2:52.80	4 Q	2:52.05	4
Robert Welbourn	S10	50m freestyle	26.74	5	Did not advance	
Robert Welbourn	S10	100m freestyle	57.12	4 Q	56.68	5
Robert Welbourn	S10	100m backstroke	1:10.09	9	Did not advance	
Robert Welbourn	S10	400m freestyle	4:25.91	1 Q	4:16.60	2nd place, silver medalist(s)
Marc Woods	S10	100m freestyle	59.97	16	Did not advance	
Marc Woods	S10	100m backstroke	1:10.28	10	Did not advance	
Kenneth Cairns; Gareth Duke; Anthony Stephens; Sascha Kindred	N/A	4 x 50m freestyle (20pts)	2:42.84	4 Q	2:37.20	3rd place, bronze medalist(s)
Kenneth Cairns; Gareth Duke; Anthony Stephens; Sascha Kindred	N/A	4 x 50m medley (20pts)	2:59.59	7 Q	2:57.06	6
David Roberts; Matthew Walker; Graham Edmunds; Robert Welbourn; Marc Woods	N/A	4 × 100 m freestyle (34pts)	4:05.14	1 Q	3:59.62 WR	1st place, gold medalist(s)
Sascha Kindred; David Roberts; Giles Long; James Crisp; Jody Cundy; Robert Welbourn	N/A	4 × 100 m medley (34pts)	4:36.26	3 Q	4:31.23	4

=== Women ===
Athlete	Class	Event	Heats		Final	
Athlete	Class	Event	Result	Rank	Result	Rank
Sarah Bailey MBE	S10	50m freestyle	31.09	4 q	30.74	4
Sarah Bailey MBE	S10	100m freestyle	1:06.32	3 Q	1:05.14	3rd place, bronze medalist(s)
Sarah Bailey MBE	S10	400m freestyle	5:15.03	3 Q	5:07.08	5
Sarah Bailey MBE	S10	100m backstroke	N/A		1:19.36	5
Sarah Bailey MBE	SB9	100m breaststroke	1:27.72	3 Q	1:25.38	2nd place, silver medalist(s)
Sarah Bailey MBE	SM10	200m individual medley	2:47.73	3 Q	2:43.34	2nd place, silver medalist(s)
Elaine Barrett	S11	50m freestyle	36.55	5	Did not advance	
Elaine Barrett	S11	100m freestyle	1:20.12	4	1:18.37	7
Elaine Barrett	S11	400m freestyle	N/A		6:05.69	8
Elaine Barrett	S12	100m butterfly	1:24.01	10	Did not advance	
Elaine Barrett	SB11	100m breaststroke	1:31.96	1 Q	1:32.31	1st place, gold medalist(s)
Elaine Barrett	SM11	200m individual medley	N/A		DSQ	
Claire Cashmore	S9	50m freestyle	31.84	2 Q	31.29	5
Claire Cashmore	S9	100m backstroke	1:17.85	5 Q	1:16.98	3rd place, bronze medalist(s)
Claire Cashmore	S9	100m butterfly	1:18.92	6 Q	1:19.60	8
Claire Cashmore	S9	100m freestyle	1:10.48	9	Did not advance	
Claire Cashmore	SM9	200m individual medley	2:51.74	5 Q	2:48.07	3rd place, bronze medalist(s)
Jeanette Chippington	S6	50m freestyle	40.83	4q	39.63	6
Jeanette Chippington	S6	100m freestyle	1:25.59	6 Q	1:27.09	7
Jenny Coughlin	S13	50m freestyle	31.39	5	Did not advance	
Jenny Coughlin	S13	100m freestyle	1:07.79	10	Did not advance	
Jenny Coughlin	S13	400m freestyle	N/A		5:03.31	7
Jenny Coughlin	S13	100m backstroke	1:18.80	3	1:18.79	7
Jenny Coughlin	S13	100m butterfly	N/A		1:15.28	6
Lara Ferguson	S9	50m freestyle	DNS		Did not advance	
Lara Ferguson	S9	100m freestyle	1:11.31	10	Did not advance	
Lara Ferguson	SB9	100m breaststroke	1:31.81	9	Did not advance	
Lara Ferguson	SM9	200m individual medley	3:12.64	8	Did not advance	
Rhiannon Henry	S13	50m freestyle	30.37	4 q	29.74	6
Rhiannon Henry	S13	100m butterfly	N/A		1:09.21	3rd place, bronze medalist(s)
Rhiannon Henry	S13	100m freestyle	1:05.88	6 Q	1:04.20	4
Rhiannon Henry	S13	400m freestyle	N/A		4:49.66	3rd place, bronze medalist(s)
Rhiannon Henry	S13	100m backstroke	1:20.48	5	1:18.03	6
Rhiannon Henry	SM13	200m individual medley	N/A		2:37.29	4
Jemma Houghton	S12	50m freestyle	32.48	5	Did not advance	
Jemma Houghton	S12	100m freestyle	1:08.43	4	1:08.73	8
Jemma Houghton	S12	400m freestyle	N/A		5:13.45	6
Jemma Houghton	S12	100m butterfly	1:17.03	5	1:16.16	4
Liz Johnson	SB6	100m breaststroke	1:46.85	2 Q	1:45.33	2nd place, silver medalist(s)
Liz Johnson	S6	50m butterfly	46.64	5	Did not advance	
Liz Johnson	SM6	200m individual medley	3:33.27	6 Q	DNS	
Natalie Jones	S6	50m freestyle	40.10	3Q	39.55	5
Natalie Jones	S6	100m backstroke	1:40.53	6 Q	1:37.13	5
Natalie Jones	S6	50m butterfly	47.02	6	Did not advance	
Natalie Jones	SB6	100m breaststroke	1:57.24	4 Q	1:52.95	5
Natalie Jones	SM6	200m individual medley	3:24.37	1 Q	3:18.68 WR	1st place, gold medalist(s)
Nyree Lewis	S6	100m backstroke	1:32.92 PR	1 Q	1:32.03 PR	1st place, gold medalist(s)
Nyree Lewis	S6	400m freestyle	6:13.16	1 Q	6:05.24	3rd place, bronze medalist(s)
Nyree Lewis	SB5	100m breaststroke	N/A		1:54.48	2nd place, silver medalist(s)
Nyree Lewis	SM6	200m individual medley	3:25.77	2 Q	3:22.20	2nd place, silver medalist(s)
Mhairi Love	S6	50m freestyle	40.27	4q	40.77	8
Mhairi Love	S6	100m freestyle	1:25.76	7 Q	1:26.04	6
Mhairi Love	S6	400m freestyle	6:15.67	4 Q	6:02.59	2nd place, silver medalist(s)
Margaret McEleny MBE	SB3	50m breaststroke	1:01.77	2 Q	1:01.72	2nd place, silver medalist(s)
Margaret McEleny MBE	SM4	150m individual medley	3:14.95	2 Q	3:12.62	2nd place, silver medalist(s)
Jane Stidever	S5	50m freestyle	49.72	4 Q	45.94	8
Jane Stidever	S5	50m backstroke	54.34	6 Q	55.04	6
Jane Stidever	S5	100m freestyle	1:40.96	8 Q	1:40.80	8
Danielle Watts	S2	50m backstroke	N/A		1:31.12	3rd place, bronze medalist(s)
Danielle Watts	S2	50m freestyle	N/A		1:32.90	3rd place, bronze medalist(s)
Danielle Watts	S2	100m freestyle	N/A		3:12.70	2nd place, silver medalist(s)
Fran Williamson	S3	50m backstroke	N/A		1:07.20	2nd place, silver medalist(s)
Fran Williamson	S3	50m freestyle	1:08.15	3 Q	1:06.57	2nd place, silver medalist(s)
Fran Williamson	S3	100m freestyle	2:20.75	3 Q	2:19.06	3rd place, bronze medalist(s)
Jeanette Chippington; Mhairi Love; Fran Williamson; Jane Stidever	N/A	4x50m freestyle relay 20pts	N/A		3:12.75	2nd place, silver medalist(s)
Jeanette Chippington; Lara Ferguson; Claire Cashmore; Sarah Bailey MBE	N/A	4 × 100 m freestyle relay 34pts	N/A		4:54.38	6
Nyree Lewis; Margaret McEleny MBE; Natalie Jones; Jane Stidever	N/A	4x50m medley relay 20pts	N/A		3:16.34	1st place, gold medalist(s)
Sarah Bailey MBE; Claire Cashmore; Lara Ferguson; Nyree Lewis	N/A	4 × 100 m medley relay 34pts	DNS			

== Table tennis ==
=== Men ===
Athlete	Event	Preliminaries				Round of 16	Quarterfinals	Semifinals	Final / BM	
Athlete	Event	Opposition Result	Opposition Result	Opposition Result	Rank	Opposition Result	Opposition Result	Opposition Result	Opposition Result	Rank
Arnie Chan	Men's singles 4	Nan (CHN); L 1-3	Stefanu (CZE); L 0-3	Freitas (BRA); W 3-2	3	Did not advance				
James Rawson	Men's singles 3	Dollmann (AUT); L 2-3	Kosco (SVK); L 2-3	Scheuvens (GER); W 3-0	3	Did not advance				
Scott Robertson	Men's singles 5	—N/a	Durand (FRA); L 1-3	Shing (HKG); L 0-3	3	Did not advance				
Neil Robinson	Men's singles 3	Gun (KOR); L 1-3	Rodríguez (ESP); W 3-2	Rosnes (NOR); W 3-0	2	Verger (FRA); W 3-2	Kesler (SCG); L 0-3	Did not advance		
Stefan Trofan	Men's singles 3	Robin (FRA); L 0-3	Sik (KOR); L 2-3	da Silva (BRA); W 3-1	2	Kosco (SVK); L 1-3	Did not advance			
Arnie Chan; Scott Robertson	Men's team - class 5	—N/a	South Korea (KOR); L 0-3	Serbia and Montenegro (SCG); L 1-3	3	Did not advance				
James Rawson; Neil Robinson; Stefan Trofan	Men's team - class 3	—N/a	Germany (GER); L 0–3	Austria (AUT); W 3–1	2	—N/a		France (FRA); W 3–2	South Korea (KOR); L 0–3	2nd place, silver medalist(s)

=== Women ===
Athlete	Event	Preliminaries				Quarterfinals	Semifinals	Final / BM	
Athlete	Event	Opposition Result	Opposition Result	Opposition Result	Rank	Opposition Result	Opposition Result	Opposition Result	Rank
Sue Gilroy	Women's singles 4	—N/a	Weinmann (GER); L 2–3	Al Azzam (JOR); L 1–3	3	Did not advance			
Catherine Mitton	Women's singles 1-2	—N/a	Clot (FRA); L 1-3	Al Bargouti (JOR); W 3-1	2	—N/a	Marziou (FRA); L 1-3	Podda (ITA); W 3-0	3rd place, bronze medalist(s)
Lynne Riding	Women's singles 1-2	Marziou (FRA); L 0-3	Podda (ITA); L 1-3	Garcia Ble (MEX); W 3-0	3	Did not advance			
Catherine Mitton; Lynne Riding	Women's team 1-3	—N/a	France (FRA); W/O	Japan (JPN); L 1-3	2	—N/a		2nd place, silver medalist(s)	

== Wheelchair basketball ==
=== Men ===
The men's team won a bronze medal.

=== Players ===
- Ade Adepitan
- Andy Blake
- Matt Byrne
- Terry Bywater
- Pete Finbow
- Kevin Hayes
- Fred Howley
- Stuart Jellows
- Simon Munn
- Jon Pollock
- Colin Price
- Sinclair Thomas

=== Results ===
Game	Match	Score	Rank
1	Great Britain vs. Canada (CAN)	45 - 63	3 Q
2	Great Britain vs. Australia (AUS)	59 - 80	3 Q
3	Great Britain vs. Italy (ITA)	48 - 51	3 Q
4	Great Britain vs. Brazil (BRA)	66 - 57	3 Q
5	Great Britain vs. France (FRA)	75 - 43	3 Q
Quarterfinals	Great Britain vs. United States (USA)	62 - 59	W
Semifinals	Great Britain vs. Australia (AUS)	52 - 64	L
Bronze medal final	Great Britain vs. Netherlands (NED)	82 - 66	3rd place, bronze medalist(s)

=== Women ===
The women's team didn't win any medals: they were 8th out of 8.

=== Players ===
- Sarah Burrett
- Jenny Dalgleish
- Jill Fox
- Sonia Howe
- Caroline MacLean
- Caroline Matthews
- Kristina Small
- Wendy Smith
- Clare Strange
- Helen Turner
- Sally Wager
- Ann Wild

=== Results ===
Game	Match	Score	Rank
1	Great Britain vs. Australia (AUS)	21 - 63	3 Q
2	Great Britain vs. United States (USA)	24 - 74	3 Q
3	Great Britain vs. Netherlands (NED)	36 - 30	3 Q
Quarterfinals	Great Britain vs. Germany (GER)	24 - 63	L
Semifinals (5th-8th)	Great Britain vs. Mexico (MEX)	29 - 40	L
7th-8th classification	Great Britain vs. Netherlands (NED)	30 - 48	8

== Wheelchair fencing ==
Athlete	Event	Qualification			Round of 16	Quarterfinal	Semifinal	Final / BM	
Athlete	Event	Opposition	Score	Rank	Opposition Score	Opposition Score	Opposition Score	Opposition Score	Rank
David Heaton	Men's individual épée B	Hu (CHN)	L 2–5	6	Did not advance				
David Heaton	Men's individual épée B	Shenkevych (UKR)	L 3-5	6	Did not advance				
David Heaton	Men's individual épée B	Rodgers (USA)	L 2–5	6	Did not advance				
David Heaton	Men's individual épée B	Wysmierski (POL)	L 2-5	6	Did not advance				
David Heaton	Men's individual épée B	Francois (FRA)	L 1-5	6	Did not advance				
David Heaton	Men's individual sabre B	Wysmierski (POL)	L 1–5	5 Q	Hoon (KOR); W 15-12	Wysmierski (POL); L 15–4	Did not advance		
David Heaton	Men's individual sabre B	Durand (FRA)	L 4-5	5 Q	Hoon (KOR); W 15-12	Wysmierski (POL); L 15–4	Did not advance		
David Heaton	Men's individual sabre B	Mayer (GER)	L 3-5	5 Q	Hoon (KOR); W 15-12	Wysmierski (POL); L 15–4	Did not advance		
David Heaton	Men's individual sabre B	Szekeres (HUN)	L 3-5	5 Q	Hoon (KOR); W 15-12	Wysmierski (POL); L 15–4	Did not advance		
David Heaton	Men's individual sabre B	Bogdos (GRE)	W 5-1	5 Q	Hoon (KOR); W 15-12	Wysmierski (POL); L 15–4	Did not advance		
David Heaton	Men's individual sabre B	Shumate (USA)	W 5-3	5 Q	Hoon (KOR); W 15-12	Wysmierski (POL); L 15–4	Did not advance		

== Wheelchair rugby ==
The rugby team didn't win any medals: they reached the bronze medal match but were lost to United States.

=== Players ===
- Alan Ash
- Andy Barrow
- Jonny Coggan
- Troye Collins
- Justin Frishberg
- Ross Morrison
- Bob O'Shea
- Steve Palmer
- Jason Roberts
- Paul Shaw
- Tony Stackhouse
- Rob Tarr

=== Results ===
Game	Match	Score	Rank
1	Great Britain vs. Belgium (BEL)	27 - 22	1 Q
2	Great Britain vs. Canada (CAN)	32 - 30 (OT)	1 Q
3	Great Britain vs. Germany (GER)	40 - 33	1 Q
Quarterfinals	Great Britain vs. Japan (JPN)	50 - 42	W
Semifinals	Great Britain vs. New Zealand (NZL)	35 - 39	L
Bronze medal final	Great Britain vs. United States (USA)	39 - 43	4

== Wheelchair tennis ==
See also Wheelchair tennis at the 2004 Summer Paralympics.

=== Men ===
Athlete	Class	Event	Round of 64	Round of 32	Round of 16	Quarterfinals	Semifinals	Finals
Athlete	Class	Event	Opposition Result	Opposition Result	Opposition Result	Opposition Result	Opposition Result	Opposition Result
David Gardner	Open	Men's singles	Chabrecek (SVK); W 6-3. 6-3	Kruszelnicki (POL); L 6-0, 6-0	Did not advance			
Simon Hatt	Open	Men's singles	Farkas (HUN); L 6-3,6-3	Did not advance				
Jayant Mistry	Open	Men's singles	Felix (FRA); W 5-7, 6-3, 6-4	Baumgartner (AUT); W 6-7, 7-5, 6-1	Saida (JPN); L 2-6, 1-6	Did not advance		
Kevin Plowman	Open	Men's singles	Erni (SUI); W 6-0, 2-6, 7-6	Wikstrom (SWE); L 2-6, 0-6	Did not advance			
David Gardner; Kevin Plowman	Open	Men's doubles	—N/a	Lee (KOR); Kwak (KOR); L 2-6, 1-6	Did not advance			
Simon Hatt; Jayant Mistry	Open	Men's doubles	Bye		Santos (BRA); Pommê (BRA); W 6-2, 6-2	Kunieda (JPN); Saida (JPN); L 1-6, 1-6	Did not advance	

=== Women ===
Athlete	Class	Event	Round of 32	Round of 16	Quarterfinals	Semifinals	Finals
Athlete	Class	Event	Opposition Result	Opposition Result	Opposition Result	Opposition Result	Opposition Result
Kimberly Blake	Open	Women's singles	Vergeer (NED); L 0-6, 1-6	Did not advance			
Kay Forshaw	Open	Women's singles	Hwang (KOR); W 6-2, 6-0	Smit (NED); W 6-4, 7-6	Di Toro (AUS); L 6-7, 0-6	Did not advance	
Janet McMorran	Open	Women's singles	Siegers (GER); L 0-6,3-6	Did not advance			

=== Quads ===
Athlete	Class	Event	Round of 16	Quarterfinals	Semifinals	Finals
Athlete	Class	Event	Opposition Result	Opposition Result	Opposition Result	Opposition Result
Mark Eccleston	Open	Quads singles	Polidori (ITA); W 3-6, 6–3, 6–2	van Erp (NED); L 1–6, 6–3, 5–7	Did not advance	
Roy Humphreys	Open	Quads singles	Taylor (USA); L 2-6, 1-6	Did not advance		
Peter Norfolk	Open	Quads singles	Whalen (USA); W 6-1, 6-2	Hunter (CAN); W 6-3, 7-5	van Erp (NED); W 6-2, 6-3	Wagner (USA); W 6-3, 6-2 (gold)
Peter Norfolk; Mark Eccleston	Open	Quads doubles	Bye		de Beer (NED) van Erp (NED); W 2-6, 7-5, 6-1	Taylor (USA); Wagner (USA); L 4-6, 1-6 (silver)

== Media coverage ==
As with the 2004 Summer Olympics, the BBC aired coverage from the games, live on the bbc.co.uk website via streaming webcasts for UK broadband users, and nightly in a 90-minute highlights programme on BBC Two, presented by Clare Balding.

== See also ==
- Great Britain at the 2004 Summer Olympics
