= Swimming at the 2004 Summer Paralympics – Men's 50 metre freestyle S7 =

Men's 50 m Freestyle S7 at the XII Paralympic Games
- Paralympic Swimming
- Venue: Olympic Aquatic Centre
- Dates: 26 September 2004
- Competitors: 15 from 11 nations
- Winning time: 28.77

Medalists
1st place, gold medalist(s)		David Roberts	Great Britain
2nd place, silver medalist(s)		Matthew Walker	Great Britain
3rd place, bronze medalist(s)		Lantz Lamback	United States

The Men's 50 metre freestyle S7 swimming event at the 2004 Summer Paralympics was competed on 26 September. It was won by David Roberts, representing Great Britain.

== 1st round ==
Qualified for final round

Heat 1

26 September 2004, morning session

Rank	Athlete	Time	Notes
1	Matthew Walker (GBR)	29.58	
2	Nimrod Zviran (ISR)	30.03	
3	Lantz Lamback (USA)	30.23	
4	Igor Lukin (RUS)	30.74	
5	Tian Rong (CHN)	31.52	
6	Mikko Harju (FIN)	32.85	
7	Dalibor Mach (CZE)	32.95	

Heat 2

26 September 2004, morning session

Rank	Athlete	Time	Notes
1	David Roberts (GBR)	29.43	
2	Yuriy Andryushin (UKR)	30.46	
3	Alex Harris (AUS)	30.62	
4	Alex Hadley (AUS)	31.00	
5	Andrew Lindsay (GBR)	31.02	
6	Janos Becsey (HUN)	31.98	
7	Tomas Scharf (CZE)	32.67	
8	Hiroshi Hosokawa (JPN)	33.10	

== Final round ==
26 September 2004, evening session

Rank	Athlete	Time	Notes
1st place, gold medalist(s)	David Roberts (GBR)	28.77	
2nd place, silver medalist(s)	Matthew Walker (GBR)	28.80	
3rd place, bronze medalist(s)	Lantz Lamback (USA)	29.71	
4	Nimrod Zviran (ISR)	30.07	
5	Alex Harris (AUS)	30.12	
6	Yuriy Andryushin (UKR)	30.74	
7	Igor Lukin (RUS)	30.96	
8	Alex Hadley (AUS)	31.08	
