= Swimming at the 2004 Summer Paralympics – Men's 400 metre freestyle S7 =

Men's 400m Freestyle S7 at the XII Paralympic Games
- Paralympic Swimming
- Venue: Olympic Aquatic Centre
- Dates: 23 September 2004
- Competitors: 11 from 10 nations
- Winning time: 4:56.11

Medalists
1st place, gold medalist(s)		David Roberts	Great Britain
2nd place, silver medalist(s)		Tian Rong	China
3rd place, bronze medalist(s)		Nimrod Zviran	Israel

The Men's 400 metre freestyle S7 swimming event at the 2004 Summer Paralympics was competed on 23 September. It was won by David Roberts, representing Great Britain.

== 1st round ==
Qualified for final round

Heat 1

23 Sept. 2004, morning session

Rank	Athlete	Time	Notes
1	Tian Rong (CHN)	5:14.05	
2	Nimrod Zviran (ISR)	5:17.08	
3	Alex Hadley (AUS)	5:17.82	
4	Jose Arnulfo Medeiros (BRA)	5:23.08	
5	Hiroshi Hosokawa (JPN)	5:29.21	

Heat 2

23 Sept. 2004, morning session

Rank	Athlete	Time	Notes
1	David Roberts (GBR)	5:03.93	
2	Andrew Lindsay (GBR)	5:09.07	
3	Lantz Lamback (USA)	5:10.27	
4	Thomas Grimm (GER)	5:24.72	
5	Dalibor Mach (CZE)	5:38.41	
6	Mikko Harju (FIN)	5:43.53	

== Final round ==
23 Sept. 2004, evening session

Rank	Athlete	Time	Notes
1st place, gold medalist(s)	David Roberts (GBR)	4:56.11	
2nd place, silver medalist(s)	Tian Rong (CHN)	5:01.84	
3rd place, bronze medalist(s)	Nimrod Zviran (ISR)	5:06.15	
4	Lantz Lamback (USA)	5:06.16	
5	Andrew Lindsay (GBR)	5:10.60	
6	Alex Hadley (AUS)	5:20.77	
7	Thomas Grimm (GER)	5:22.05	
8	Jose Arnulfo Medeiros (BRA)	5:28.40	
