= Swimming at the 2004 Summer Paralympics – Men's 100 metre freestyle S7 =

Men's 100m Freestyle S7 at the XII Paralympic Games
- Paralympic Swimming
- Venue: Olympic Aquatic Centre
- Dates: 20 September 2004
- Competitors: 11 from 9 nations
- Winning time: 1:01.65

Medalists
1st place, gold medalist(s)		David Roberts	Great Britain
2nd place, silver medalist(s)		Matthew Walker	Great Britain
3rd place, bronze medalist(s)		Lantz Lamback	United States

The Men's 100 metre freestyle S7 swimming event at the 2004 Summer Paralympics was competed on 20 September. It was won by David Roberts, representing Great Britain.

== 1st round ==
Qualified for final round

Heat 1

20 Sept. 2004, morning session

Rank	Athlete	Time	Notes
1	Matthew Walker (GBR)	1:04.28	
2	Lantz Lamback (USA)	1:05.20	
3	Alex Harris (AUS)	1:06.95	
4	Igor Lukin (RUS)	1:08.86	
5	Mikko Harju (FIN)	1:12.18	

Heat 2

20 Sept. 2004, morning session

Rank	Athlete	Time	Notes
1	David Roberts (GBR)	1:03.13	PR
2	Nimrod Zviran (ISR)	1:07.27	
3	Alex Hadley (AUS)	1:07.71	
4	Tian Rong (CHN)	1:08.08	
5	Dalibor Mach (CZE)	1:11.73	
	Yuriy Andryushin (UKR)	DSQ	

== Final round ==
20 Sept. 2004, evening session

Rank	Athlete	Time	Notes
1st place, gold medalist(s)	David Roberts (GBR)	1:01.65	WR
2nd place, silver medalist(s)	Matthew Walker (GBR)	1:04.22	
3rd place, bronze medalist(s)	Lantz Lamback (USA)	1:05.02	
4	Alex Harris (AUS)	1:05.79	
5	Alex Hadley (AUS)	1:06.85	
6	Nimrod Zviran (ISR)	1:07.06	
7	Igor Lukin (RUS)	1:07.64	
8	Tian Rong (CHN)	1:08.41	
