= Swimming at the 2004 Summer Paralympics – Women's 50 metre backstroke S2 =

Women's 50m Backstroke S2 at the XII Paralympic Games
- Paralympic Swimming
- Venue: Olympic Aquatic Centre
- Dates: 27 September 2004
- Competitors: 7 from 6 nations
- Winning time: 1:19.25

Medalists
1st place, gold medalist(s)		Sara Carracelas	Spain
2nd place, silver medalist(s)		Maria Kalpakidou	Greece
3rd place, bronze medalist(s)		Danielle Watts	Great Britain

The Women's 50 metre backstroke S2 swimming event at the 2004 Summer Paralympics was competed on 27 September. It was won by Sara Carracelas García, representing Spain.

== Final round ==
27 Sept. 2004, evening session

Rank	Athlete	Time	Notes
1st place, gold medalist(s)	Sara Carracelas (ESP)	1:19.25	PR
2nd place, silver medalist(s)	Maria Kalpakidou (GRE)	1:28.30	
3rd place, bronze medalist(s)	Danielle Watts (GBR)	1:31.12	
4	Betiana Basualdo (ARG)	1:35.88	
5	Virginia Hernandez (MEX)	1:42.56	
6	Alejandra Perezlindo (ARG)	1:48.66	
7	Katarzyna Mielczarek (POL)	2:23.01	
