= Swimming at the 2004 Summer Paralympics – Women's 100 metre freestyle S2 =

Women's 100m Freestyle S2 at the XII Paralympic Games
- Paralympic Swimming
- Venue: Olympic Aquatic Centre
- Dates: 21 September 2004
- Competitors: 6 from 5 nations
- Winning time: 2:49.38

Medalists
1st place, gold medalist(s)		Sara Carracelas	Spain
2nd place, silver medalist(s)		Danielle Watts	Great Britain
3rd place, bronze medalist(s)		Betiana Basualdo	Argentina

The women's 100 metre freestyle S2 swimming event at the 2004 Summer Paralympics was competed on 21 September. It was won by Sara Carracelas, representing Spain.

== Final round ==
21 Sept. 2004, evening session

Rank	Athlete	Time	Notes
1st place, gold medalist(s)	Sara Carracelas (ESP)	2:49.38	
2nd place, silver medalist(s)	Danielle Watts (GBR)	3:12.70	
3rd place, bronze medalist(s)	Betiana Basualdo (ARG)	3:17.93	
4	Maria Kalpakidou (GRE)	3:19.24	
5	Virginia Hernandez (MEX)	3:28.81	
6	Alejandra Perezlindo (ARG)	3:40.11	
