= Swimming at the 2004 Summer Paralympics – Men's 200 metre individual medley SM7 =

Men's 200m Individual Medley SM7 at the XII Paralympic Games
- Paralympic Swimming
- Venue: Olympic Aquatic Centre
- Dates: 19 September 2004
- Competitors: 14 from 10 nations
- Winning time: 2:43.65

Medalists
1st place, gold medalist(s)		Rudy Garcia	United States
2nd place, silver medalist(s)		David Roberts	Great Britain
3rd place, bronze medalist(s)		Eric Lindmann	France

The Men's 200 metre individual medley SM7 swimming event at the 2004 Summer Paralympics was competed on 19 September. It was won by Rudy Garcia, representing United States.

== 1st round ==
Qualified for final round

Heat 1

19 Sept. 2004, morning session

Rank	Athlete	Time	Notes
1	Rudy Garcia (USA)	2:42.20	WR
2	Tian Rong (CHN)	2:48.35	
3	David Roberts (GBR)	2:50.48	
4	Matthew Walker (GBR)	2:52.80	
5	Igor Lukin (RUS)	3:06.53	
6	Kirill Sokolov (RUS)	3:08.14	
	Daisuke Ejima (JPN)	DSQ	

Heat 2

19 Sept. 2004, morning session

Rank	Athlete	Time	Notes
1	Eric Lindmann (FRA)	2:53.68	
2	Janos Becsey (HUN)	2:54.83	
3	Yuriy Andryushin (UKR)	2:57.54	
4	Gledson Soares (BRA)	2:57.65	
5	Pei Mang (CHN)	2:59.69	
6	Andrew Lindsay (GBR)	3:04.59	
7	Dalibor Mach (CZE)	3:15.18	

== Final round ==
19 Sept. 2004, evening session

Rank	Athlete	Time	Notes
1st place, gold medalist(s)	Rudy Garcia (USA)	2:43.65	
2nd place, silver medalist(s)	David Roberts (GBR)	2:47.03	
3rd place, bronze medalist(s)	Eric Lindmann (FRA)	2:48.46	
4	Matthew Walker (GBR)	2:52.05	
5	Tian Rong (CHN)	2:53.50	
6	Janos Becsey (HUN)	2:53.69	
7	Gledson Soares (BRA)	2:56.50	
8	Yuriy Andryushin (UKR)	2:59.41	
