= Swimming at the 2004 Summer Paralympics – Men's 100 metre freestyle S6 =

Men's 100m Freestyle S6 at the XII Paralympic Games
- Paralympic Swimming
- Venue: Olympic Aquatic Centre
- Dates: 20 September 2004
- Competitors: 14 from 10 nations
- Winning time: 1:07.60

Medalists
1st place, gold medalist(s)		Yin Jianhua	China
2nd place, silver medalist(s)		Tang Yuan	China
3rd place, bronze medalist(s)		Anders Olsson	Sweden

The Men's 100 metre freestyle S6 swimming event at the 2004 Summer Paralympics was competed on 20 September. It was won by Yin Jianhua, representing China.

== 1st round ==
Qualified for final round

Heat 1

20 Sept. 2004, morning session

Rank	Athlete	Time	Notes
1	Yin Jianhua (CHN)	1:08.62	
2	Tang Yuan (CHN)	1:10.30	
3	Swen Michaelis (GER)	1:11.85	
4	Sebastian Iwanow (GER)	1:11.95	
5	Danijel Pavlinec (SLO)	1:14.83	
6	Gareth Duke (GBR)	1:18.20	
7	Alastair Smales (AUS)	1:24.23	

Heat 2

20 Sept. 2004, morning session

Rank	Athlete	Time	Notes
1	Anders Olsson (SWE)	1:09.22	
2	Peter Lund Andersen (DEN)	1:10.28	
3	Adriano Lima (BRA)	1:11.27	
4	Daniel Vidal (ESP)	1:12.15	
5	Luis Silva (BRA)	1:14.61	
6	Soren Moller (DEN)	1:15.49	
7	Daisuke Maeda (JPN)	1:16.14	

== Final round ==
20 Sept. 2004, evening session

Rank	Athlete	Time	Notes
1st place, gold medalist(s)	Yin Jianhua (CHN)	1:07.60	WR
2nd place, silver medalist(s)	Tang Yuan (CHN)	1:09.04	
3rd place, bronze medalist(s)	Anders Olsson (SWE)	1:09.47	
4	Peter Lund Andersen (DEN)	1:09.72	
5	Daniel Vidal (ESP)	1:10.83	
6	Sebastian Iwanow (GER)	1:11.64	
7	Swen Michaelis (GER)	1:12.02	
8	Adriano Lima (BRA)	1:12.11	
