= Equestrian at the 2004 Summer Paralympics – Individual freestyle test grade I =

Mixed Dressage - Freestyle grade I at the XII Paralympic Games
- Paralympic Equestrian
- Venue: Markopoulo Olympic Equestrian Centre
- Dates: 23 September 2004
- Competitors: 16 from 12 nations
- Winning points: 87.000

Medalists
1st place, gold medalist(s)		Lee Pearson MBE	Great Britain
2nd place, silver medalist(s)		Lynn Seidemann	United States
3rd place, bronze medalist(s)		Jan Pike	Australia

The Individual freestyle test grade I equestrian event at the 2004 Summer Paralympics was competed on 23 September. It was won by Lee Pearson MBE, representing Great Britain.

== Final round ==
23 Sept. 2004, 10:00

Rank	Athlete	Points	Notes
1st place, gold medalist(s)	Lee Pearson MBE (GBR)	87.000	
2nd place, silver medalist(s)	Lynn Seidemann (USA)	76.063	
3rd place, bronze medalist(s)	Jan Pike (AUS)	74.375	
4	Sophie Christiansen (GBR)	73.250	
5	Anne Dunham (GBR)	71.125	
6	Omer Ben Dor (ISR)	70.313	
7	Jens Lasse Dokkan (NOR)	68.875	
8	Rosa Loewenthal (PER)	68.875	
9	Marcos Alves (BRA)	66.250	
10	Mauro Caredda (ITA)	65.875	
11	Slaven Hudina (CRO)	63.875	
12	Mina Chinju (JPN)	62.625	
13	Ivan Srsic (CRO)	59.750	
14	Keith Newerla (USA)	58.688	
15	Sandra Mitchell (BER)	55.188	
	Judi Island (CAN)	DNS	
