= Swimming at the 2004 Summer Paralympics – Men's 100 metre backstroke S7 =

Men's 100m Backstroke S7 at the XII Paralympic Games
- Paralympic Swimming
- Venue: Olympic Aquatic Centre
- Dates: 22 September 2004
- Competitors: 10 from 6 nations
- Winning time: 1:16.67

Medalists
1st place, gold medalist(s)		Andrew Lindsay	Great Britain
2nd place, silver medalist(s)		Guillermo Marro	Argentina
3rd place, bronze medalist(s)		Eric Lindmann	France

The Men's 100 metre backstroke S7 swimming event at the 2004 Summer Paralympics was competed on 22 September. It was won by Andrew Lindsay, representing Great Britain.

== 1st round ==
Qualified for next round

Heat 1

22 September 2004, morning session

Rank	Athlete	Time	Notes
1	Lantz Lamback (USA)	1:20.33	
2	Eric Lindmann (FRA)	1:21.04	
3	David Roberts (GBR)	1:21.32	
4	Hiroshi Hosokawa (JPN)	1:22.76	
5	Jose Gonzales-Mugaburu (PER)	1:29.50	

Heat 2

22 September 2004, morning session

Rank	Athlete	Time	Notes
1	Andrew Lindsay (GBR)	1:15.49	PR
2	Guillermo Marro (ARG)	1:16.64	
3	Daisuke Ejima (JPN)	1:19.19	
4	Daniel Kamber (USA)	1:25.49	
5	Aaron Paulson (USA)	1:26.60	

== Final round ==
22 September 2004, evening session

Rank	Athlete	Time	Notes
1st place, gold medalist(s)	Andrew Lindsay (GBR)	1:16.67	
2nd place, silver medalist(s)	Guillermo Marro (ARG)	1:16.98	
3rd place, bronze medalist(s)	Eric Lindmann (FRA)	1:17.97	
4	David Roberts (GBR)	1:18.81	
5	Daisuke Ejima (JPN)	1:19.99	
6	Lantz Lamback (USA)	1:20.59	
7	Hiroshi Hosokawa (JPN)	1:22.94	
8	Daniel Kamber (USA)	1:27.15	
