= Swimming at the 2004 Summer Paralympics – Women's 50 metre freestyle S9 =

Women's 50m Freestyle S9 at the XII Paralympic Games
- Paralympic Swimming
- Venue: Olympic Aquatic Centre
- Dates: 26 September 2004
- Competitors: 10 from 9 nations
- Winning time: 29.52

Medalists
1st place, gold medalist(s)		Natalie du Toit	South Africa
2nd place, silver medalist(s)		Irina Grazhdanova	Russia
3rd place, bronze medalist(s)		Stephanie Dixon	Canada

The Women's 50 metre freestyle S9 swimming event at the 2004 Summer Paralympics was competed on 26 September. It was won by Natalie du Toit, representing South Africa.

== 1st round ==
Qualified for final round

Heat 1

26 Sept. 2004, morning session

Rank	Athlete	Time	Notes
1	Kelly Crowley (USA)	31.56	
2	Claire Cashmore (GBR)	31.84	
3	Beata Drozdowska (POL)	31.85	
4	Stephanie Dixon (CAN)	32.28	
5	Jessica Smith (AUS)	33.12	

Heat 2

26 Sept. 2004, morning session

Rank	Athlete	Time	Notes
1	Natalie du Toit (RSA)	29.54	PR
2	Irina Grazhdanova (RUS)	31.14	
3	Christiane Reppe (GER)	31.72	
4	Sisse Grynet Egeborg (DEN)	32.27	
	Lara Ferguson (GBR)	DNS	

== Final round ==
26 Sept. 2004, evening session

Rank	Athlete	Time	Notes
1st place, gold medalist(s)	Natalie du Toit (RSA)	29.52	WR
2nd place, silver medalist(s)	Irina Grazhdanova (RUS)	30.63	
3rd place, bronze medalist(s)	Stephanie Dixon (CAN)	30.66	
4	Kelly Crowley (USA)	31.25	
5	Claire Cashmore (GBR)	31.29	
6	Christiane Reppe (GER)	31.77	
7	Beata Drozdowska (POL)	31.82	
8	Sisse Grynet Egeborg (DEN)	32.19	
