= Swimming at the 2004 Summer Paralympics – Women's 100 metre backstroke S9 =

Women's 100m Backstroke S9 at the XII Paralympic Games
- Paralympic Swimming
- Venue: Olympic Aquatic Centre
- Dates: 25 September 2004
- Competitors: 13 from 10 nations
- Winning time: 1:10.01

Medalists
1st place, gold medalist(s)		Stephanie Dixon	Canada
2nd place, silver medalist(s)		Natalie du Toit	South Africa
3rd place, bronze medalist(s)		Claire Cashmore	Great Britain

The Women's 100 metre backstroke S9 swimming event at the 2004 Summer Paralympics was competed on 25 September. It was won by Stephanie Dixon, representing Canada.

== 1st round ==
Qualified for final round

Heat 1

25 Sept. 2004, morning session

Rank	Athlete	Time	Notes
1	Natalie du Toit (RSA)	1:12.12	
2	Elizabeth Stone (USA)	1:17.27	
3	Tatiana Outekina (RUS)	1:19.34	
4	Mandy Drennan (AUS)	1:19.68	
5	Katerina Bailey (AUS)	1:23.36	
6	Tereza Diepoldova (CZE)	1:23.94	

Heat 2

25 Sept. 2004, morning session

Rank	Athlete	Time	Notes
1	Stephanie Dixon (CAN)	1:14.71	
2	Beata Drozdowska (POL)	1:17.48	
3	Claire Cashmore (GBR)	1:17.85	
4	Jen Durrant (USA)	1:20.46	
5	Claudia Knoth (GER)	1:20.96	
6	Emilie Gral (FRA)	1:22.34	
7	Darda Geiger (CAN)	1:23.81	

== Final round ==
25 Sept. 2004, evening session

Rank	Athlete	Time	Notes
1st place, gold medalist(s)	Stephanie Dixon (CAN)	1:10.01	WR
2nd place, silver medalist(s)	Natalie du Toit (RSA)	1:11.41	
3rd place, bronze medalist(s)	Claire Cashmore (GBR)	1:16.98	
4	Beata Drozdowska (POL)	1:17.07	
5	Elizabeth Stone (USA)	1:18.93	
6	Tatiana Outekina (RUS)	1:19.55	
7	Jen Durrant (USA)	1:20.33	
8	Mandy Drennan (AUS)	1:20.59	
