= Equestrian at the 2004 Summer Paralympics – Individual championship test grade I =

Mixed Dressage - Championship grade I at the XII Paralympic Games
- Paralympic Equestrian
- Venue: Markopoulo Olympic Equestrian Centre
- Dates: 21 September 2004
- Competitors: 17 from 13 nations
- Winning points: 77.263

Medalists
1st place, gold medalist(s)		Lee Pearson MBE	Great Britain
2nd place, silver medalist(s)		Jan Pike	Australia
3rd place, bronze medalist(s)		Sophie Christiansen	Great Britain

The Individual championship test grade I equestrian event at the 2004 Summer Paralympics was competed on 21 September. It was won by Lee Pearson MBE, representing Great Britain.

== Final round ==
21 Sept. 2004, 10:00

Rank	Athlete	Points	Notes
1st place, gold medalist(s)	Lee Pearson MBE (GBR)	77.263	
2nd place, silver medalist(s)	Jan Pike (AUS)	71.895	
3rd place, bronze medalist(s)	Sophie Christiansen (GBR)	70.000	
4	Keith Newerla (USA)	69.684	
5	Lynn Seidemann (USA)	68.947	
6	Anne Dunham (GBR)	67.895	
7	Omer Ben Dor (ISR)	67.158	
8	Rosa Loewenthal (PER)	66.842	
8	Jens Lasse Dokkan (NOR)	66.842	
10	Mauro Caredda (ITA)	65.368	
11	Judi Island (CAN)	65.158	
12	Slaven Hudina (CRO)	64.842	
13	Marcos Alves (BRA)	63.684	
14	Mina Chinju (JPN)	62.421	
15	Ivan Srsic (CRO)	56.211	
16	Sandra Mitchell (BER)	53.895	
	Valerie Salles (FRA)	DNS	
