= Shooting at the 2004 Summer Paralympics – Women's 10 metre air pistol SH1 =

Women's 10m Air Pistol SH1 at the XII Paralympic Games
- Paralympic Shooting
- Venue: Markopoulo Olympic Shooting Centre
- Dates: 19 September 2004
- Competitors: 12 from 10 nations
- Winning points: 466.8

Medalists
1st place, gold medalist(s)		Isabel Newstead MBE	Great Britain
2nd place, silver medalist(s)		Lin Chin Mei	Chinese Taipei
3rd place, bronze medalist(s)		Yelena Taranova	Azerbaijan

The Women's 10m Air Pistol SH1 shooting event at the 2004 Summer Paralympics was competed on 19 September. It was won by Isabel Newstead MBE, representing Great Britain.

== Preliminary ==
Qualified for next round

19 Sept. 2004, 12:15

Rank	Athlete	Points	Notes
1	Isabel Newstead MBE (GBR)	371	Q
2	Lin Chin Mei (TPE)	367	Q
3	Olivera Nakovska (MKD)	365	Q
4	Anastasia Panteleeva (RUS)	363	Q
5	Yelena Taranova (AZE)	363	Q
6	Nayyereh Akef (IRI)	362	Q
7	Karen van Nest (CAN)	360	Q
8	Tatiana Biryukova (RUS)	360	Q
9	Bae Young Ee (KOR)	360	
10	Christine Stoeckl (GER)	357	
11	Yoo Eun Joo (KOR)	357	
12	Lone Overbye (DEN)	351	

== Final round ==
19 Sept. 2004, 15:15

Rank	Athlete	Points	Notes
1st place, gold medalist(s)	Isabel Newstead MBE (GBR)	466.8	
2nd place, silver medalist(s)	Lin Chin Mei (TPE)	465.1	
3rd place, bronze medalist(s)	Yelena Taranova (AZE)	457.3	
4	Anastasia Panteleeva (RUS)	456.6	
5	Karen van Nest (CAN)	451.6	
6	Olivera Nakovska (MKD)	451.0	
7	Tatiana Biryukova (RUS)	450.7	
8	Nayyereh Akef (IRI)	443.8	
