= Swimming at the 2004 Summer Paralympics – Men's 200 metre individual medley SM6 =

Men's 200m Individual Medley SM6 at the XII Paralympic Games
- Paralympic Swimming
- Venue: Olympic Aquatic Centre
- Dates: 19 September 2004
- Competitors: 13 from 9 nations
- Winning time: 2:51.39

Medalists
1st place, gold medalist(s)		Sascha Kindred	Great Britain
2nd place, silver medalist(s)		Yang Yuan Run	China
3rd place, bronze medalist(s)		Swen Michaelis	Germany

The Men's 200 metre individual medley SM6 swimming event at the 2004 Summer Paralympics was competed on 19 September. It was won by Sascha Kindred, representing Great Britain.

== 1st round ==
Qualified for final round

Heat 1

19 Sept. 2004, morning session

Rank	Athlete	Time	Notes
1	Zhang Jinbo (CHN)	3:04.87	
2	Adriano Lima (BRA)	3:08.69	
3	Mateusz Michalski (POL)	3:08.89	
4	Anders Olsson (SWE)	3:12.14	
5	Adam Pardy (CAN)	3:12.26	
	Thomas Grimm (GER)	DSQ	

Heat 2

19 Sept. 2004, morning session

Rank	Athlete	Time	Notes
1	Sascha Kindred (GBR)	2:56.09	PR
2	Yang Yuan Run (CHN)	3:00.70	
3	Swen Michaelis (GER)	3:03.72	
4	Tadhg Slattery (RSA)	3:06.18	
5	Li Peng (CHN)	3:07.37	
6	Maciej Sucharski (POL)	3:19.21	
7	Prajim Rieangsantien (THA)	3:28.92	

== Final round ==
19 Sept. 2004, evening session

Rank	Athlete	Time	Notes
1st place, gold medalist(s)	Sascha Kindred (GBR)	2:51.39	PR
2nd place, silver medalist(s)	Yang Yuan Run (CHN)	3:01.94	
3rd place, bronze medalist(s)	Swen Michaelis (GER)	3:03.42	
4	Li Peng (CHN)	3:03.54	
5	Zhang Jinbo (CHN)	3:03.73	
6	Tadhg Slattery (RSA)	3:06.00	
7	Mateusz Michalski (POL)	3:09.82	
8	Adriano Lima (BRA)	3:10.91	
