= Dmytro Kryzhanovskyy =

Ukrainian Paralympic swimmer

Medal record

Swimming

Representing Ukraine

Paralympic Games
Gold medal – first place	2008 Beijing	50 metre freestyle - S5
Silver medal – second place	2004 Athens	50 metre freestyle - S5
Silver medal – second place	2004 Athens	100 metre freestyle - S5
Silver medal – second place	2008 Beijing	100 metre freestyle - S5

World Championships
Gold medal – first place	2006 Durban	50 m freestyle S5
Silver medal – second place	2010 Eindhoven	4×50m medley - 20pts
Silver medal – second place	2010 Eindhoven	4×50m freestyle - 20pts
Bronze medal – third place	2006 Durban	200 m freestyle S5

Dmytro Kryzhanovskyy (Ukrainian: Дмитро Крижановський, also transliterated Dmitry Kryzhanovskiy) is a paralympic swimmer from Ukraine competing mainly in category S5 events.

Dmitry has competed in two paralympics for Ukraine winning a total of four medals including one gold. His first games were the 2004 Summer Paralympics where he competed in the 50m butterfly finishing fifth, winning silver in both the 50 m and 100 m freestyle behind Spain's Sebastián Rodríguez Veloso who set a new world record in both events. His second games were the 2008 Summer Paralympics where he competed as part of the 20pt 4×50 m medley where the Ukrainian team finished fifth, he also finished second again in the 100 m freestyle this time behind Brazil's Daniel Dias who broke the old world record before beating Daniel into silver medal position in the 50 m freestyle.
