= Swimming at the 2004 Summer Paralympics – Women's 200 metre individual medley SM10 =

Women's 200m Individual Medley SM10 at the XII Paralympic Games
- Paralympic Swimming
- Venue: Olympic Aquatic Centre
- Dates: 23 September 2004
- Competitors: 10 from 8 nations
- Winning time: 2:38.10

Medalists
1st place, gold medalist(s)		Mikhaila Rutherford	United States
2nd place, silver medalist(s)		Sarah Bailey MBE	Great Britain
3rd place, bronze medalist(s)		Claudia Hengst	Germany

The Women's 200 metre individual medley SM10 swimming event at the 2004 Summer Paralympics was competed on 23 September. It was won by Mikhaila Rutherford, representing United States.

== 1st round ==
Qualified for final round

Heat 1

23 Sept. 2004, morning session

Rank	Athlete	Time	Notes
1	Mikhaila Rutherford (USA)	2:42.93	
2	Anne Polinario (CAN)	2:48.12	
3	Theresa Griffin (NZL)	2:51.07	
4	Qian Hui Yu (CHN)	2:52.21	
5	Wang Shuai (CHN)	2:53.51	

Heat 2

23 Sept. 2004, morning session

Rank	Athlete	Time	Notes
1	Katarzyna Pawlik (POL)	2:47.41	
2	Claudia Hengst (GER)	2:47.73	
3	Sarah Bailey MBE (GBR)	2:47.73	
4	Mia Juhl Mortensen (DEN)	2:51.93	
5	Katarzyna Brzostowska (POL)	2:58.79	

== Final round ==
23 Sept. 2004, evening session

Rank	Athlete	Time	Notes
1st place, gold medalist(s)	Mikhaila Rutherford (USA)	2:38.10	
2nd place, silver medalist(s)	Sarah Bailey MBE (GBR)	2:43.34	
3rd place, bronze medalist(s)	Claudia Hengst (GER)	2:45.57	
4	Anne Polinario (CAN)	2:45.66	
5	Katarzyna Pawlik (POL)	2:46.78	
6	Qian Hui Yu (CHN)	2:52.16	
7	Theresa Griffin (NZL)	2:52.31	
8	Mia Juhl Mortensen (DEN)	2:54.65	
