= Swimming at the 2004 Summer Paralympics – Men's 100 metre breaststroke SB8 =

Men's 100m Breaststroke SB8 at the XII Paralympic Games
- Paralympic Swimming
- Venue: Olympic Aquatic Centre
- Dates: 21 September 2004
- Competitors: 9 from 9 nations
- Winning time: 1:10.40

Medalists
1st place, gold medalist(s)		Andriy Kalyna	Russia
2nd place, silver medalist(s)		James Crisp	Great Britain
3rd place, bronze medalist(s)		Li Keqiang	China

The men's 100 metre breaststroke SB8 swimming event at the 2004 Summer Paralympics was competed on 21 September. It was won by Andriy Kalyna, representing Ukraine.

== 1st round ==
Qualified for next round

Heat 1

21 Sept. 2004, morning session

Rank	Athlete	Time	Notes
1	Krzyzstof Paterka (POL)	1:12.30	PR
2	Li Keqiang (CHN)	1:19.71	
3	Chikara Ara (JPN)	1:20.80	
4	Konstantinos Fykas (GRE)	1:22.69	

Heat 2

21 Sept. 2004, morning session

Rank	Athlete	Time	Notes
1	Andriy Kalyna (RUS)	1:11.02	PR
2	James Crisp (GBR)	1:20.35	
3	Jarrett Perry (USA)	1:20.66	
4	Alex Racoveanu (SWE)	1:23.74	
	Mikalai Kalatski (BLR)	DSQ	

== Final round ==
21 Sept. 2004, evening session

Rank	Athlete	Time	Notes
1st place, gold medalist(s)	Andriy Kalyna (RUS)	1:10.40	WR
2nd place, silver medalist(s)	James Crisp (GBR)	1:19.47	
3rd place, bronze medalist(s)	Li Keqiang (CHN)	1:19.59	
4	Jarrett Perry (USA)	1:20.09	
5	Chikara Ara (JPN)	1:20.34	
6	Alex Racoveanu (SWE)	1:23.30	
7	Konstantinos Fykas (GRE)	1:23.72	
	Krzyzstof Paterka (POL)	DSQ	
