= Swimming at the 2004 Summer Paralympics – Women's 50 metre backstroke S5 =

Women's 50m Backstroke S5 at the XII Paralympic Games
- Paralympic Swimming
- Venue: Olympic Aquatic Centre
- Dates: 20 September 2004
- Competitors: 10 from 8 nations
- Winning time: 42.36

Medalists
1st place, gold medalist(s)		Běla Hlaváčková	Czech Republic
2nd place, silver medalist(s)		Beatrice Hess	France
3rd place, bronze medalist(s)		Teresa Perales	Spain

The Women's 50 metre backstroke S5 swimming event at the 2004 Summer Paralympics was competed on 20 September. It was won by Běla Hlaváčková, representing Czech Republic.

== 1st round ==
Qualified for final round

Heat 1

20 Sept. 2004, morning session

Rank	Athlete	Time	Notes
1	Beatrice Hess (FRA)	44.29	
2	Katerina Liskova (CZE)	49.97	
3	Jane Stidever (GBR)	54.34	
4	Theresa Goh (SIN)	1:00.65	
5	Katalin Engelhardt (HUN)	1:03.06	

Heat 2

20 Sept. 2004, morning session

Rank	Athlete	Time	Notes
1	Běla Hlaváčková (CZE)	41.78	
2	Teresa Perales (ESP)	46.17	
3	Diána Zámbó (HUN)	53.81	
4	Kaley McLean (CAN)	1:03.70	
5	Rildene Firmino (BRA)	1:09.79	

== Final round ==
20 Sept. 2004, evening session

Rank	Athlete	Time	Notes
1st place, gold medalist(s)	Běla Hlaváčková (CZE)	42.36	
2nd place, silver medalist(s)	Beatrice Hess (FRA)	43.74	
3rd place, bronze medalist(s)	Teresa Perales (ESP)	45.39	
4	Katerina Liskova (CZE)	51.11	
5	Diána Zámbó (HUN)	53.45	
6	Jane Stidever (GBR)	55.04	
7	Theresa Goh (SIN)	58.72	
8	Katalin Engelhardt (HUN)	1:04.35	
