= Swimming at the 2004 Summer Paralympics – Men's 50 metre backstroke S2 =

Men's 50m Backstroke S2 at the XII Paralympic Games
- Paralympic Swimming
- Venue: Olympic Aquatic Centre
- Dates: 27 September 2004
- Competitors: 12 from 10 nations
- Winning time: 1:05.51

Medalists
| 1st place, gold medalist(s) | | James Anderson | Great Britain |
| 2nd place, silver medalist(s) | | Miroslaw Piesak | Poland |
| 3rd place, bronze medalist(s) | | Georgios Kapellakis | Greece |

The Men's 50 metre backstroke S2 swimming event at the 2004 Summer Paralympics was competed on 27 September. It was won by James Anderson, representing Great Britain.

== 1st round ==
| Qualified for final round |

Heat 1

27 Sept. 2004, morning session

| Rank | Athlete | Time | Notes |
|---|---|---|---|
| 1 | Curtis Lovejoy (USA) | 1:04.43 | WR |
| 2 | Pekka Kantola (FIN) | 1:15.45 | |
| 3 | Denys Zhumela (UKR) | 1:16.01 | |
| 4 | Vojtech Franek (CZE) | 1:17.67 | |
| 5 | Antonios Kymoundris (GRE) | 1:21.99 | |
| 6 | Marcos Omar Suarez (COL) | 1:30.09 | |

Heat 2

27 Sept. 2004, morning session

| Rank | Athlete | Time | Notes |
|---|---|---|---|
| 1 | James Anderson (GBR) | 1:10.01 | |
| 2 | Miroslaw Piesak (POL) | 1:12.78 | |
| 3 | Georgios Kapellakis (GRE) | 1:17.98 | |
| 4 | Adriano Pereira (BRA) | 1:20.14 | |
| 5 | Christian Goldbach (GER) | 1:21.26 | |
| 6 | Nikolaos Kaplanis (GRE) | 1:24.43 | |

== Final round ==
27 Sept. 2004, evening session

| Rank | Athlete | Time | Notes |
|---|---|---|---|
| 1st place, gold medalist(s) | James Anderson (GBR) | 1:05.51 | |
| 2nd place, silver medalist(s) | Miroslaw Piesak (POL) | 1:09.42 | |
| 3rd place, bronze medalist(s) | Georgios Kapellakis (GRE) | 1:11.46 | |
| 4 | Pekka Kantola (FIN) | 1:14.42 | |
| 5 | Curtis Lovejoy (USA) | 1:16.68 | |
| 6 | Vojtech Franek (CZE) | 1:17.31 | |
| 7 | Denys Zhumela (UKR) | 1:17.88 | |
| 8 | Adriano Pereira (BRA) | 1:19.75 | |
