= Swimming at the 2004 Summer Paralympics – Men's 100 metre butterfly S10 =

Men's 100m Butterfly S10 at the XII Paralympic Games
- Paralympic Swimming
- Venue: Olympic Aquatic Centre
- Dates: 20 September 2004
- Competitors: 15 from 11 nations
- Winning time: 59.54

Medalists
1st place, gold medalist(s)		Benoît Huot	Canada
2nd place, silver medalist(s)		Daniel Bell	Australia
3rd place, bronze medalist(s)		Jody Cundy	Great Britain

The Men's 100 metre butterfly S10 swimming event at the 2004 Summer Paralympics was competed on 20 September. It was won by Benoît Huot, representing Canada.

== 1st round ==
Qualified for final round

Heat 1

20 Sept. 2004, morning session

Rank	Athlete	Time	Notes
1	David Levecq (ESP)	1:01.40	
2	Jody Cundy (GBR)	1:01.65	
3	Mike van der Zanden (NED)	1:01.80	
4	Luis Carlos Fernandez (CRC)	1:02.96	
5	Kamil Dragowski (POL)	1:05.28	
6	Filip Coufal (CZE)	1:07.28	
	Yang Fu (CHN)	DSQ	

Heat 2

20 Sept. 2004, morning session

Rank	Athlete	Time	Notes
1	Daniel Bell (AUS)	59.83	PR
2	Benoît Huot (CAN)	1:00.92	
3	Piotr Pijanowski (POL)	1:02.90	
4	Justin Zook (USA)	1:04.30	
5	Jiang Sheng Quan (CHN)	1:04.59	
6	Rick Pendleton (AUS)	1:06.31	
7	Marcelo Collet (BRA)	1:06.61	
8	Yu Qi Min (CHN)	1:16.10	

== Final round ==
20 Sept. 2004, evening session

Rank	Athlete	Time	Notes
1st place, gold medalist(s)	Benoît Huot (CAN)	59.54	WR
2nd place, silver medalist(s)	Daniel Bell (AUS)	59.67	
3rd place, bronze medalist(s)	Jody Cundy (GBR)	1:01.02	
4	David Levecq (ESP)	1:01.07	
5	Mike van der Zanden (NED)	1:01.48	
6	Piotr Pijanowski (POL)	1:01.68	
7	Luis Carlos Fernandez (CRC)	1:02.96	
8	Justin Zook (USA)	1:04.25	
