= Swimming at the 2004 Summer Paralympics – Men's 100 metre breaststroke SB7 =

Men's 100m Breaststroke SB7 at the XII Paralympic Games
- Paralympic Swimming
- Venue: Olympic Aquatic Centre
- Dates: 21 September 2004
- Competitors: 10 from 7 nations
- Winning time: 1:23.28

Medalists
1st place, gold medalist(s)		Sascha Kindred	Great Britain
2nd place, silver medalist(s)		Gong Baoren	China
3rd place, bronze medalist(s)		Tomotaro Nakamura	Japan
3rd place, bronze medalist(s)		Li Peng	China

The Men's 100 metre breaststroke SB7 swimming event at the 2004 Summer Paralympics was competed on 21 September. It was won by Sascha Kindred, representing Great Britain, with two swimmers tied in bronze medal position.

== 1st round ==
Qualified for next round

Heat 1

21 Sept. 2004, morning session

Rank	Athlete	Time	Notes
1	Li Peng (CHN)	1:27.12	
2	Gong Baoren (CHN)	1:27.33	
3	Matthew Walker (GBR)	1:30.30	
4	Janos Becsey (HUN)	1:34.55	
5	Alex Harris (AUS)	1:40.72	

Heat 2

21 Sept. 2004, morning session

Rank	Athlete	Time	Notes
1	Sascha Kindred (GBR)	1:24.51	PR
2	Tomotaro Nakamura (JPN)	1:25.02	
3	Rudy Garcia (USA)	1:27.89	
4	Christoph Burkard (GER)	1:28.97	
5	Liu Ce (CHN)	1:31.75	

== Final round ==
21 Sept. 2004, evening session

Rank	Athlete	Time	Notes
1st place, gold medalist(s)	Sascha Kindred (GBR)	1:23.28	PR
2nd place, silver medalist(s)	Gong Baoren (CHN)	1:24.20	
3rd place, bronze medalist(s)	Tomotaro Nakamura (JPN)	1:25.72	
3rd place, bronze medalist(s)	Li Peng (CHN)	1:25.72	
5	Rudy Garcia (USA)	1:26.68	
6	Christoph Burkard (GER)	1:29.49	
7	Liu Ce (CHN)	1:32.14	
	Matthew Walker (GBR)	DSQ	
