= Gong Baoren =

Chinese Paralympic swimmer

Personal information
- Native name: 宫宝仁
- Born: 1971 (age 54–55) Sanjiacheng, Qingyuan Manchu Autonomous County, Liaoning, China

Sport
- Sport: Swimming
- Classifications: SB7
Medal record
Paralympic Swimming
Representing China
Paralympic Games
| Gold medal – first place | 1996 Atlanta | Men's 100 metre breaststroke SB7 |
| Gold medal – first place | 2004 Athens | Men's 4 x 50 metre freestyle relay 20pts |
| Silver medal – second place | 2000 Sydney | Men's 100 metre breaststroke SB7 |
| Silver medal – second place | 2004 Athens | Men's 100 metre breaststroke SB7 |
IPC Swimming World Championships
| Gold medal – first place | 1998 Christchurch | Men's 100 metre breaststroke SB7 |
| Silver medal – second place | 2002 Mar del Plata | Men's 100 metre breaststroke SB7 |

Gong Baoren
- Simplified Chinese: 宫宝仁
Transcriptions
Standard Mandarin
- Hanyu Pinyin: Gōng Bǎorén

Gong Baoren (Chinese: 宫宝仁, born August 1971 in Qingyuan Manchu Autonomous County, Liaoning) is a retired Chinese para swimmer who competed in the Sydney 2000 paralympic men's 100 m breaststroke SB7 event, finishing 0.03 second behind the finalist. He was distinguished from the other competitors in that he had no arms.
