= Swimming at the 2004 Summer Paralympics – Men's 200 metre freestyle S5 =

Men's 200m Freestyle S5 at the XII Paralympic Games
- Paralympic Swimming
- Venue: Olympic Aquatic Centre
- Dates: 21 September 2004
- Competitors: 9 from 7 nations
- Winning time: 2:41.87

Medalists
1st place, gold medalist(s)		Sebastián Rodríguez	Spain
2nd place, silver medalist(s)		Anthony Stephens	Great Britain
3rd place, bronze medalist(s)		Ryszard Beczek	Poland

The Men's 200 metre freestyle S5 swimming event at the 2004 Summer Paralympics was competed on 21 September. It was won by Sebastián Rodríguez, representing Spain.

== 1st round ==
Qualified for final round

Heat 1

21 Sept. 2004, morning session

Rank	Athlete	Time	Notes
1	Ryszard Beczek (POL)	2:52.47	
2	Ervin Kovacs (HUN)	2:54.98	
3	Javier Torres (ESP)	3:21.16	
4	Chee Kin Wong (MAS)	3:26.07	

Heat 2

21 Sept. 2004, morning session

Rank	Athlete	Time	Notes
1	Anthony Stephens (GBR)	2:47.93	PR
2	Sebastián Rodríguez (ESP)	2:58.09	
3	Krzyzstof Sleczka (POL)	3:10.35	
4	Back Min Jun (KOR)	3:40.29	
5	Voravit Kaewkham (THA)	3:49.84	

== Final round ==
21 Sept. 2004, evening session

Rank	Athlete	Time	Notes
1st place, gold medalist(s)	Sebastián Rodríguez (ESP)	2:41.87	WR
2nd place, silver medalist(s)	Anthony Stephens (GBR)	2:45.84	
3rd place, bronze medalist(s)	Ryszard Beczek (POL)	2:49.37	
4	Ervin Kovacs (HUN)	2:52.99	
5	Krzyzstof Sleczka (POL)	3:08.59	
6	Javier Torres (ESP)	3:12.65	
7	Chee Kin Wong (MAS)	3:20.96	
8	Back Min Jun (KOR)	3:40.91	
