= Swimming at the 2004 Summer Paralympics – Men's 100 metre backstroke S9 =

Men's 100m Backstroke S9 at the XII Paralympic Games
- Paralympic Swimming
- Venue: Olympic Aquatic Centre
- Dates: 25 September 2004
- Competitors: 18 from 11 nations
- Winning time: 1:05.35

Medalists
| 1st place, gold medalist(s) | | Jarrett Perry | United States |
| 2nd place, silver medalist(s) | | James Crisp | Great Britain |
| 3rd place, bronze medalist(s) | | Jesus Collado | Spain |

The Men's 100 metre backstroke S9 swimming event at the 2004 Summer Paralympics was competed on 25 September. It was won by Jarrett Perry, representing United States.

== 1st round ==
| Qualified for next round |

Heat 1

25 Sept. 2004, morning session

| Rank | Athlete | Time | Notes |
|---|---|---|---|
| 1 | Jesus Collado (ESP) | 1:09.08 | |
| 2 | David Hill (GBR) | 1:09.73 | |
| 3 | Mark Barr (USA) | 1:10.78 | |
| 4 | Li Rong (CHN) | 1:12.40 | |
| 5 | Ryuji Sakimoto (JPN) | 1:13.96 | |
| 6 | Admir Ahmethodzic (BIH) | 1:16.69 | |

Heat 2

25 Sept. 2004, morning session

| Rank | Athlete | Time | Notes |
|---|---|---|---|
| 1 | Jarrett Perry (USA) | 1:05.76 | |
| 2 | Michael Prout (USA) | 1:10.33 | |
| 3 | Andrew Haley (CAN) | 1:10.41 | |
| 4 | Jonas Martens (BEL) | 1:10.57 | |
| 5 | Mauro Brasil (BRA) | 1:11.20 | |
| 6 | Guo Zhi (CHN) | 1:11.21 | |

Heat 3

25 Sept. 2004, morning session

| Rank | Athlete | Time | Notes |
|---|---|---|---|
| 1 | James Crisp (GBR) | 1:06.68 | |
| 2 | Wang Renjie (CHN) | 1:08.06 | |
| 3 | Brad Sales (CAN) | 1:08.29 | |
| 4 | Matthew Cowdrey (AUS) | 1:09.70 | |
| 5 | Luis Alberto Nunez (ESP) | 1:11.31 | |
| 6 | Andriy Sirovatchenko (UKR) | 1:13.52 | |

== Final round ==
25 Sept. 2004, evening session

| Rank | Athlete | Time | Notes |
|---|---|---|---|
| 1st place, gold medalist(s) | Jarrett Perry (USA) | 1:05.35 | |
| 2nd place, silver medalist(s) | James Crisp (GBR) | 1:05.42 | |
| 3rd place, bronze medalist(s) | Jesus Collado (ESP) | 1:07.00 | |
| 4 | Wang Renjie (CHN) | 1:07.54 | |
| 5 | Brad Sales (CAN) | 1:08.15 | |
| 6 | Matthew Cowdrey (AUS) | 1:08.44 | |
| 7 | Michael Prout (USA) | 1:08.46 | |
| 8 | David Hill (GBR) | 1:10.13 | |
