= Swimming at the 2004 Summer Paralympics – Women's 100 metre breaststroke SB6 =

Women's 100m Breaststroke SB6 at the XII Paralympic Games
- Paralympic Swimming
- Venue: Olympic Aquatic Centre
- Dates: 24 September 2004
- Competitors: 11 from 7 nations
- Winning time: 1:41.84

Medalists
1st place, gold medalist(s)		Sarah Bowen	Australia
2nd place, silver medalist(s)		Liz Johnson	Great Britain
3rd place, bronze medalist(s)		Deborah Gruen	United States

The Women's 100 metre breaststroke SB6 swimming event at the 2004 Summer Paralympics was competed on 24 September. It was won by Sarah Bowen, representing Australia.

== 1st round ==
Qualified for final round

Heat 1

24 Sept. 2004, morning session

Rank	Athlete	Time	Notes
1	Deborah Gruen (USA)	1:47.12	
2	Sarah Castle (USA)	1:50.88	
3	Maria Götze (GER)	1:59.94	
4	Brandi Van Anne (USA)	2:01.44	
5	Velia Flores (MEX)	2:08.62	

Heat 2

24 Sept. 2004, morning session

Rank	Athlete	Time	Notes
1	Sarah Bowen (AUS)	1:46.20	
2	Liz Johnson (GBR)	1:46.85	
3	Petra Hrabinova (CZE)	1:56.34	
4	Natalie Jones (GBR)	1:57.24	
5	Katrina Porter (AUS)	1:57.79	
6	Natasa Sobocan (CRO)	2:15.18	

== Final round ==
24 Sept. 2004, evening session

Rank	Athlete	Time	Notes
1st place, gold medalist(s)	Sarah Bowen (AUS)	1:41.84	WR
2nd place, silver medalist(s)	Liz Johnson (GBR)	1:45.33	
3rd place, bronze medalist(s)	Deborah Gruen (USA)	1:46.52	
4	Sarah Castle (USA)	1:48.32	
5	Natalie Jones (GBR)	1:52.95	
6	Petra Hrabinova (CZE)	1:55.10	
7	Katrina Porter (AUS)	1:56.38	
8	Maria Götze (GER)	1:57.99	
