= Swimming at the 2004 Summer Paralympics – Men's 200 metre individual medley SM12 =

Men's 200m Individual Medley SM12 at the XII Paralympic Games
- Paralympic Swimming
- Venue: Olympic Aquatic Centre
- Dates: 22 September 2004
- Competitors: 12 from 6 nations
- Winning time: 2:14.42

Medalists
1st place, gold medalist(s)		Sergei Punko	Belarus
2nd place, silver medalist(s)		Raman Makarau	Belarus
3rd place, bronze medalist(s)		Enrique Floriano	Spain

The Men's 200 metre individual medley SM12 swimming event at the 2004 Summer Paralympics was competed on 22 September. It was won by Sergei Punko, representing Belarus.

== 1st round ==
Qualified for final round

Heat 1

22 Sept. 2004, morning session

Rank	Athlete	Time	Notes
1	Raman Makarau (BLR)	2:22.50	
2	Dmytro Kuzmin (UKR)	2:25.69	
3	Israel Oliver (ESP)	2:29.31	
4	Juan Diego Gil (ESP)	2:33.33	
5	Darren Leach (GBR)	2:33.77	
6	Koshiro Sugita (JPN)	2:44.97	

Heat 2

22 Sept. 2004, morning session

Rank	Athlete	Time	Notes
1	Sergei Punko (BLR)	2:20.02	PR
2	Enrique Floriano (ESP)	2:22.28	
3	Sergiy Klippert (UKR)	2:23.72	
4	Yoshikazu Sakai (JPN)	2:27.85	
5	Robert Musiorski (POL)	2:31.31	
6	Yury Rudzenok (BLR)	2:32.76	

== Final round ==
22 Sept. 2004, evening session

Rank	Athlete	Time	Notes
1st place, gold medalist(s)	Sergei Punko (BLR)	2:14.42	WR
2nd place, silver medalist(s)	Raman Makarau (BLR)	2:17.88	
3rd place, bronze medalist(s)	Enrique Floriano (ESP)	2:18.02	
4	Sergiy Klippert (UKR)	2:20.10	
5	Dmytro Kuzmin (UKR)	2:22.26	
6	Yoshikazu Sakai (JPN)	2:27.93	
7	Israel Oliver (ESP)	2:28.40	
8	Robert Musiorski (POL)	2:29.45	
