= Swimming at the 2004 Summer Paralympics – Men's 50 metre freestyle S5 =

Men's 50m Freestyle S5 at the XII Paralympic Games
- Paralympic Swimming
- Venue: Olympic Aquatic Centre
- Dates: 27 September 2004
- Competitors: 10 from 8 nations
- Winning time: 32.62

Medalists
1st place, gold medalist(s)		Sebastián Rodríguez	Spain
2nd place, silver medalist(s)		Dmytro Kryzhanovskyy	Ukraine
3rd place, bronze medalist(s)		Anthony Stephens	Great Britain

The Men's 50 metre freestyle S5 swimming event at the 2004 Summer Paralympics was competed on 27 September. It was won by Sebastián Rodríguez, representing Spain.

== 1st round ==
Qualified for final round

Heat 1

27 Sept. 2004, morning session

Rank	Athlete	Time	Notes
1	Anthony Stephens (GBR)	36.54	
2	He Junquan (CHN)	36.64	
3	Jordi Gordillo (ESP)	38.29	
4	Francisco Avelino (BRA)	42.17	
5	Back Min Jun (KOR)	42.99	

Heat 2

27 Sept. 2004, morning session

Rank	Athlete	Time	Notes
1	Dmytro Kryzhanovskyy (UKR)	34.54	
2	Sebastián Rodríguez (ESP)	36.19	
3	Ryszard Beczek (POL)	39.13	
4	Sanit Songnork (THA)	40.52	
5	Voravit Kaewkham (THA)	40.68	

== Final round ==
27 Sept. 2004, evening session

Rank	Athlete	Time	Notes
1st place, gold medalist(s)	Sebastián Rodríguez (ESP)	32.62	WR
2nd place, silver medalist(s)	Dmytro Kryzhanovskyy (UKR)	33.63	
3rd place, bronze medalist(s)	Anthony Stephens (GBR)	35.65	
4	He Junquan (CHN)	36.61	
5	Ryszard Beczek (POL)	36.65	
6	Jordi Gordillo (ESP)	38.91	
7	Voravit Kaewkham (THA)	39.23	
8	Sanit Songnork (THA)	40.10	
