= Cycling at the 2004 Summer Paralympics – Men's individual pursuit (CP 3) =

Men's Individual Pursuit CP Div 3 at the XII Paralympic Games
- Paralympic Cycling (track)
- Venue: Olympic Velodrome
- Dates: 19–20 September 2004
- Competitors: 7 from 6 nations

Medalists
1st place, gold medalist(s)		Darren Kenny	Great Britain
2nd place, silver medalist(s)		Javier Otxoa	Spain
3rd place, bronze medalist(s)		Andrew Panazzolo	Australia

The Men's individual pursuit CP Div 3 track cycling event at the 2004 Summer Paralympics was competed from 19 to 20 September. It was won by Darren Kenny, representing Great Britain.

== Qualifying ==
Qualified for gold final
Qualified for bronze final

19 Sept. 2004, 10:50

Rank	Athlete	Time	Notes
1	Javier Otxoa (ESP)	3:57.48	WR
2	Darren Kenny (GBR)	3:59.19	
3	Andrew Panazzolo (AUS)	4:06.52	
4	Maurice Eckhard (ESP)	4:08.55	
5	Daniel Nicholson (USA)	4:09.29	
6	Rodrigo Lopez (ARG)	4:17.98	
	Jean Quevillon (CAN)	DSQ	

== Final round ==
Gold

20 Sept. 2004, 14:15

Rank	Athlete	Time	Notes
1st place, gold medalist(s)	Darren Kenny (GBR)	3:46.26	WR
2nd place, silver medalist(s)	Javier Otxoa (ESP)	3:54.17	

Bronze

Rank	Athlete	Time	Notes
3rd place, bronze medalist(s)	Andrew Panazzolo (AUS)	3:58.87	
4	Maurice Eckhard (ESP)	4:07.41	
