= Swimming at the 2004 Summer Paralympics – Men's 200 metre individual medley SM9 =

Men's 200m Individual Medley SM9 at the XII Paralympic Games
- Paralympic Swimming
- Venue: Olympic Aquatic Centre
- Dates: 23 September 2004
- Competitors: 13 from 8 nations
- Winning time: 2:21.80

Medalists
1st place, gold medalist(s)		Matthew Cowdrey	Australia
2nd place, silver medalist(s)		Andriy Kalyna	Ukraine
3rd place, bronze medalist(s)		James Crisp	Great Britain

The Men's 200 metre individual medley SM9 swimming event at the 2004 Summer Paralympics was competed on 23 September. It was won by Matthew Cowdrey, representing Australia.

== 1st round ==
Qualified for final round

Heat 1

23 Sept. 2004, morning session

Rank	Athlete	Time	Notes
1	Matthew Cowdrey (AUS)	2:26.44	
2	Michael Prout (USA)	2:27.17	
3	Cody Bureau (USA)	2:28.00	
4	Guo Zhi (CHN)	2:31.90	
5	Alex Racoveanu (SWE)	2:38.40	
6	Taras Yastremskyy (UKR)	2:46.25	

Heat 2

23 Sept. 2004, morning session

Rank	Athlete	Time	Notes
1	James Crisp (GBR)	2:26.27	
2	Andriy Kalyna (UKR)	2:27.04	
3	Jarrett Perry (USA)	2:29.48	
4	Xiong Xiao Ming (CHN)	2:32.04	
5	Andrew Haley (CAN)	2:32.64	
6	David Hill (GBR)	2:39.47	
	Manasa Marisiale (FIJ)	DSQ	

== Final round ==
23 Sept. 2004, evening session

Rank	Athlete	Time	Notes
1st place, gold medalist(s)	Matthew Cowdrey (AUS)	2:21.80	WR
2nd place, silver medalist(s)	Andriy Kalyna (UKR)	2:22.13	
3rd place, bronze medalist(s)	James Crisp (GBR)	2:24.88	
4	Michael Prout (USA)	2:25.15	
5	Cody Bureau (USA)	2:25.81	
6	Jarrett Perry (USA)	2:29.59	
7	Guo Zhi (CHN)	2:32.29	
	Xiong Xiao Ming (CHN)	DSQ	
