= Swimming at the 2004 Summer Paralympics – Men's 100 metre breaststroke SB6 =

Men's 100m Breaststroke SB6 at the XII Paralympic Games
- Paralympic Swimming
- Venue: Olympic Aquatic Centre
- Dates: 24 September 2004
- Competitors: 8 from 8 nations
- Winning time: 1:29.93

Medalists
1st place, gold medalist(s)		Gareth Duke	Great Britain
2nd place, silver medalist(s)		Travis Mohr	United States
3rd place, bronze medalist(s)		Eric Lindmann	France

The men's 100 metre breaststroke SB6 swimming event at the 2004 Summer Paralympics was competed on 24 September. It was won by Gareth Duke, representing Great Britain.

== Final round ==
24 Sept. 2004, evening session

Rank	Athlete	Time	Notes
1st place, gold medalist(s)	Gareth Duke (GBR)	1:29.93	PR
2nd place, silver medalist(s)	Travis Mohr (USA)	1:29.96	
3rd place, bronze medalist(s)	Eric Lindmann (FRA)	1:33.57	
4	Kirill Sokolov (RUS)	1:35.12	
5	Gledson Soares (BRA)	1:38.90	
6	Jumpei Kimura (JPN)	1:41.96	
7	Jose Gonzales-Mugaburu (PER)	1:43.26	
8	Dalibor Mach (CZE)	1:44.11	
