= Swimming at the 2004 Summer Paralympics – Women's 100 metre breaststroke SB5 =

Women's 100m Breaststroke SB5 at the XII Paralympic Games
- Paralympic Swimming
- Venue: Olympic Aquatic Centre
- Dates: 24 September 2004
- Competitors: 8 from 8 nations
- Winning time: 1:52.81

Medalists
1st place, gold medalist(s)		Kirsten Bruhn	Germany
2nd place, silver medalist(s)		Nyree Lewis	Great Britain
3rd place, bronze medalist(s)		Gitta Raczko	Hungary

The Women's 100 metre breaststroke SB5 swimming event at the 2004 Summer Paralympics was competed on 24 September. It was won by Kirsten Bruhn, representing Germany.

== Final round ==
24 Sept. 2004, evening session

Rank	Athlete	Time	Notes
1st place, gold medalist(s)	Kirsten Bruhn (GER)	1:52.81	PR
2nd place, silver medalist(s)	Nyree Lewis (GBR)	1:54.48	
3rd place, bronze medalist(s)	Gitta Ráczkó (HUN)	1:55.87	
4	Noelia García (ESP)	2:01.16	
5	Natalia Shavel (BLR)	2:06.84	
6	Yuri Kitamura (JPN)	2:07.64	
7	Elizabeth Freiin von Wechmar (RSA)	2:10.16	
	Maryna Klemyashova (UKR)	DNF	
