= Swimming at the 2004 Summer Paralympics – Men's 200 metre individual medley SM5 =

Men's 200m Individual Medley SM5 at the XII Paralympic Games
- Paralympic Swimming
- Venue: Olympic Aquatic Centre
- Dates: 23 September 2004
- Competitors: 11 from 11 nations
- Winning time: 3:04.15

Medalists
| 1st place, gold medalist(s) | | He Junquan | China |
| 2nd place, silver medalist(s) | | Ervin Kovacs | Hungary |
| 3rd place, bronze medalist(s) | | Pascal Pinard | France |

The Men's 200 metre individual medley SM5 swimming event at the 2004 Summer Paralympics was competed on 23 September. It was won by He Junquan, representing China.

== 1st round ==
| Qualified for final round |

Heat 1

23 Sept. 2004, morning session

| Rank | Athlete | Time | Notes |
|---|---|---|---|
| 1 | He Junquan (CHN) | 3:08.11 | PR |
| 2 | Pablo Cimadevilla (ESP) | 3:19.34 | |
| 3 | Anthony Stephens (GBR) | 3:33.07 | |
| 4 | Moisés Fuentes (COL) | 3:53.38 | |
| 5 | Voravit Kaewkham (THA) | 4:01.65 | |

Heat 2

23 Sept. 2004, morning session

| Rank | Athlete | Time | Notes |
|---|---|---|---|
| 1 | Ervin Kovacs (HUN) | 3:05.39 | WR |
| 2 | Pascal Pinard (FRA) | 3:18.32 | |
| 3 | Ivanildo Vasconcelos (BRA) | 3:34.79 | |
| 4 | Marcelo Ariel Quassi (ARG) | 3:45.44 | |
| 5 | Vidal Dominguez (MEX) | 3:49.80 | |
| | Park Jong Man (KOR) | DSQ | |

== Final round ==
23 Sept. 2004, evening session

| Rank | Athlete | Time | Notes |
|---|---|---|---|
| 1st place, gold medalist(s) | He Junquan (CHN) | 3:04.15 | WR |
| 2nd place, silver medalist(s) | Ervin Kovacs (HUN) | 3:06.21 | |
| 3rd place, bronze medalist(s) | Pascal Pinard (FRA) | 3:12.55 | |
| 4 | Pablo Cimadevilla (ESP) | 3:18.10 | |
| 5 | Anthony Stephens (GBR) | 3:26.64 | |
| 6 | Ivanildo Vasconcelos (BRA) | 3:26.93 | |
| 7 | Vidal Dominguez (MEX) | 3:47.98 | |
| 8 | Marcelo Ariel Quassi (ARG) | 3:48.00 | |
