= David Hill (parathlete) =

David Hill (born 1989) is a British Paralympic athlete who competed at the 2004 Summer Paralympics and the 2016 Summer Paralympics. In 2004 he competed as a swimmer in both the 100 metre backstroke S9 and the 200 metre individual medley SM9 events. In 2016 he competed in the paratriathlon PT4 event.
