= Swimming at the 2004 Summer Paralympics – Women's 100 metre breaststroke SB9 =

Women's 100m Breaststroke SB9 at the XII Paralympic Games
- Paralympic Swimming
- Venue: Olympic Aquatic Centre
- Dates: 22 September 2004
- Competitors: 12 from 10 nations
- Winning time: 1:24.17

Medalists
1st place, gold medalist(s)		Katerina Coufalova	Czech Republic
2nd place, silver medalist(s)		Sarah Bailey MBE	Great Britain
3rd place, bronze medalist(s)		Carly Haynie	United States

The Women's 100 metre breaststroke SB9 swimming event at the 2004 Summer Paralympics was competed on 22 September. It was won by Katerina Coufalova, representing Czech Republic.

== 1st round ==
Qualified for final round

Heat 1

22 Sept. 2004, morning session

Rank	Athlete	Time	Notes
1	Carly Haynie (USA)	1:26.29	
2	Yulia Nikitina (RUS)	1:27.76	
3	Mitsuki Yamauchi (JPN)	1:28.68	
4	Li Fang (CHN)	1:29.19	
5	Lara Ferguson (GBR)	1:31.81	
6	Claudia Knoth (GER)	1:35.35	

Heat 2

22 Sept. 2004, morning session

Rank	Athlete	Time	Notes
1	Katerina Coufalova (CZE)	1:23.19	
2	Sarah Bailey MBE (GBR)	1:27.72	
3	Qian Hui Yu (CHN)	1:29.11	
4	Theresa Griffin (NZL)	1:31.07	
5	Emilie Gral (FRA)	1:33.81	
	Viera Mikulasikova (SVK)	DSQ	

== Final round ==
22 Sept. 2004, evening session

Rank	Athlete	Time	Notes
1st place, gold medalist(s)	Katerina Coufalova (CZE)	1:24.17	
2nd place, silver medalist(s)	Sarah Bailey MBE (GBR)	1:25.38	
3rd place, bronze medalist(s)	Carly Haynie (USA)	1:25.92	
4	Qian Hui Yu (CHN)	1:27.66	
5	Mitsuki Yamauchi (JPN)	1:28.70	
6	Yulia Nikitina (RUS)	1:28.74	
7	Li Fang (CHN)	1:29.50	
8	Theresa Griffin (NZL)	1:30.37	
