= Swimming at the 2004 Summer Paralympics – Women's 150 metre individual medley SM4 =

Women's 150m Individual Medley SM4 at the XII Paralympic Games
- Paralympic Swimming
- Venue: Olympic Aquatic Centre
- Dates: 26 September 2004
- Competitors: 10 from 10 nations
- Winning time: 2:45.20

Medalists
1st place, gold medalist(s)		Mayumi Narita	Japan
2nd place, silver medalist(s)		Margaret McEleny MBE	Great Britain
3rd place, bronze medalist(s)		Marayke Jonkers	Australia

The Women's 150 metre individual medley SM4 swimming event at the 2004 Summer Paralympics was competed on 26 September. It was won by Mayumi Narita, representing Japan.

== 1st round ==
Qualified for final round

Heat 1

26 Sept. 2004, morning session

Rank	Athlete	Time	Notes
1	Margaret McEleny MBE (GBR)	3:14.95	
2	Sofiya Avramova (UKR)	3:24.27	
3	Natalia Popova (RUS)	3:39.67	
4	Aimee Bruder (USA)	3:40.95	
5	Sandra Erikson (SWE)	4:15.07	

Heat 2

26 Sept. 2004, morning session

Rank	Athlete	Time	Notes
1	Mayumi Narita (JPN)	2:51.67	WR
2	Marayke Jonkers (AUS)	3:26.01	
3	Karolina Hamer (POL)	3:28.62	
4	Patricia Valle (MEX)	3:47.24	
5	Rildene Firmino (BRA)	3:55.21	

== Final round ==
26 Sept. 2004, evening session

Rank	Athlete	Time	Notes
1st place, gold medalist(s)	Mayumi Narita (JPN)	2:45.20	WR
2nd place, silver medalist(s)	Margaret McEleny MBE (GBR)	3:12.62	
3rd place, bronze medalist(s)	Marayke Jonkers (AUS)	3:26.90	
4	Karolina Hamer (POL)	3:29.58	
5	Sofiya Avramova (UKR)	3:29.69	
6	Aimee Bruder (USA)	3:41.35	
7	Patricia Valle (MEX)	3:42.48	
8	Natalia Popova (RUS)	3:42.84	
