= Cycling at the 2004 Summer Paralympics – Women's sprint =

Women's Sprint Tandem B1-3 at the XII Paralympic Games
- Paralympic Cycling
- Venue: Olympic Velodrome
- Dates: 19–20 September
- Competitors: 6 from 5 nations

Medalists
1st place, gold medalist(s)		Lindy Hou; Janelle Lindsay	Australia
2nd place, silver medalist(s)		Aileen McGlynn; Ellen Hunter	Great Britain
3rd place, bronze medalist(s)		Karissa Whitsell; Katie Compton	United States

The Women's Sprint Tandem B1-3 cycling competition at the 2004 Summer Paralympics was held from 19 to 20 September at the Olympic Velodrome.

The event was won by Lindy Hou and her sighted pilot Janelle Lindsay, representing Australia.

== Results ==
=== Ranking Round ===
Qualified for final round

Rank	Competitor	Points	Notes
1	Lindy Hou (AUS); Janelle Lindsay (AUS)	11.675	WR
2	Karissa Whitsell (USA); Katie Compton (USA)	11.864	
3	Aileen McGlynn (GBR); Ellen Hunter (GBR)	11.939	
4	Jenny MacPherson (AUS); Lyn Lepore (AUS)	12.645	
5	Shawn Marsolais (CAN); Lisa Sweeney (CAN)	13.352	
6	Xu Yi Mei (CHN); Yan Xiaolei (CHN)	14.962	

=== Final Round ===
Semifinals
Lindy Hou (AUS); Janelle Lindsay (AUS)	12.973	13.920
Jenny MacPherson (AUS); Lyn Lepore (AUS)
Aileen McGlynn (GBR); Ellen Hunter (GBR)	13.117	14.363
Karissa Whitsell (USA); Katie Compton (USA)

Final
Lindy Hou (AUS); Janelle Lindsay (AUS)	13.174	12.819
Aileen McGlynn (GBR); Ellen Hunter (GBR)
Third place
Karissa Whitsell (USA); Katie Compton (USA)
Jenny MacPherson (AUS); Lyn Lepore (AUS)	------	DNS	------

=== 5-6 Place Match ===
Rank	Name	Time
5	Xu Yi Mei (CHN); Yan Xiaolei (CHN)	14.016
6	Shawn Marsolais (CAN); Lisa Sweeney (CAN)	
