= Swimming at the 2008 Summer Paralympics – Men's 100 metre freestyle S5 =

Men's 100 metre freestyle S5 at the XIII Paralympic Games
- Venue: Beijing National Aquatics Center
- Dates: September 7
- Competitors: 9 from 7 nations

Medalists
1st place, gold medalist(s)		Daniel Dias	Brazil
2nd place, silver medalist(s)		Dmytro Kryzhanovskyy	Ukraine
3rd place, bronze medalist(s)		Roy Perkins	United States

The men's 100 metre freestyle S5 event at the 2008 Paralympic Games took place on September 7, at the Beijing National Aquatics Center.

Two heats were held, with four swimmers in the first heat and five swimmers in the second heat. The swimmers with the eight fastest times advanced to the final; there, they all competed in a single final heat to earn final placements.

== Heats ==
=== Heat 1 ===
Rank	Lane	Name	Nationality	Time	Notes
1	3	Roy Perkins	United States	1:17.86	Q
2	4	Sebastián Rodríguez	Spain	1:18.44	Q
3	5	Anthony Stephens	Great Britain	1:19.10	Q
4	6	Takayuki Suzuki	Japan	1:25.51	Q

=== Heat 2 ===
Rank	Lane	Name	Nationality	Time	Notes
1	4	Daniel Dias	Brazil	1:14.14	Q
2	5	Dmytro Kryzhanovskyy	Ukraine	1:14.45	Q
3	3	Clodoaldo Silva	Brazil	1:18.81	Q
4	6	Jordi Gordillo	Spain	1:25.91	Q
5	2	Moisés Fuentes	Colombia	1:30.90	

== Final ==
Rank	Lane	Name	Nationality	Time	Notes
1	4	Daniel Dias	Brazil	1:11.05	
2	5	Dmytro Kryzhanovskyy	Ukraine	1:12.73	
3	3	Roy Perkins	United States	1:15.31	
4	7	Anthony Stephens	Great Britain	1:16.07	
5	6	Sebastián Rodríguez	Spain	1:16.15	
6	2	Clodoaldo Silva	Brazil	1:21.14	
7	1	Takayuki Suzuki	Japan	1:25.29	
8	8	Jorid Gordillo	Spain	1:25.94	
