= Swimming at the 2004 Summer Paralympics – Men's 400 metre freestyle S10 =

Men's 400m Freestyle S10 at the XII Paralympic Games
- Paralympic Swimming
- Venue: Olympic Aquatic Centre
- Dates: 24 September 2004
- Competitors: 11 from 9 nations
- Winning time: 4:15.01

Medalists
1st place, gold medalist(s)		Benoît Huot	Canada
2nd place, silver medalist(s)		Robert Welbourn	Great Britain
3rd place, bronze medalist(s)		Piotr Pijanowski	Poland

The Men's 400 metre freestyle S10 swimming event at the 2004 Summer Paralympics was competed on 24 September. It was won by Benoît Huot, representing Canada.

== 1st round ==
Qualified for final round

Heat 1

24 Sept. 2004, morning session

Rank	Athlete	Time	Notes
1	Joost de Hoogh (NED)	4:28.82	
2	Justin Zook (USA)	4:29.23	
3	Piotr Pijanowski (POL)	4:29.55	
4	Lukas Urbanek (CZE)	4:32.68	
5	Filip Coufal (CZE)	4:42.97	

Heat 2

24 Sept. 2004, morning session

Rank	Athlete	Time	Notes
1	Robert Welbourn (GBR)	4:25.91	
2	Benoît Huot (CAN)	4:28.03	
3	Mike van der Zanden (NED)	4:29.47	
4	Marcelo Collet (BRA)	4:34.11	
5	Luis Carlos Fernandez (CRC)	4:36.13	
6	Li Jun (CHN)	4:39.53	

== Final round ==
24 Sept. 2004, evening session

Rank	Athlete	Time	Notes
1st place, gold medalist(s)	Benoît Huot (CAN)	4:15.01	
2nd place, silver medalist(s)	Robert Welbourn (GBR)	4:16.60	
3rd place, bronze medalist(s)	Piotr Pijanowski (POL)	4:22.12	
4	Mike van der Zanden (NED)	4:23.81	
5	Joost de Hoogh (NED)	4:24.86	
6	Lukas Urbanek (CZE)	4:29.82	
7	Marcelo Collet (BRA)	4:32.45	
8	Justin Zook (USA)	4:35.03	
