= Swimming at the 2004 Summer Paralympics – Women's 200 metre individual medley SM6 =

Women's 200m Individual Medley SM6 at the XII Paralympic Games
- Paralympic Swimming
- Venue: Olympic Aquatic Centre
- Dates: 19 September 2004
- Competitors: 12 from 8 nations
- Winning time: 3:18.68

Medalists
1st place, gold medalist(s)		Natalie Jones	Great Britain
2nd place, silver medalist(s)		Nyree Lewis	Great Britain
3rd place, bronze medalist(s)		Maria Götze	Germany

The Women's 200 metre individual medley SM6 swimming event at the 2004 Summer Paralympics was competed on 19 September. It was won by Natalie Jones, representing Great Britain.

== 1st round ==
Qualified for final round

Heat 1

19 Sept. 2004, morning session

Rank	Athlete	Time	Notes
1	Natalie Jones (GBR)	3:24.37	
2	Ludivine Loiseau (FRA)	3:31.53	
3	Jiang Fuying (CHN)	3:32.88	
4	Doramitzi González (MEX)	3:37.77	
5	Casey Johnson (USA)	3:52.96	
6	Brandi Van Anne (USA)	3:59.57	

Heat 2

19 Sept. 2004, morning session

Rank	Athlete	Time	Notes
1	Nyree Lewis (GBR)	3:25.77	
2	Maria Götze (GER)	3:31.77	
3	Liz Johnson (GBR)	3:33.27	
4	Sarah Rose (AUS)	3:35.55	
5	Dianne Saunders (AUS)	3:48.55	
	Reeta Peltola (FIN)	DNS	

== Final round ==
19 Sept. 2004, evening session

Rank	Athlete	Time	Notes
1st place, gold medalist(s)	Natalie Jones (GBR)	3:18.68	WR
2nd place, silver medalist(s)	Nyree Lewis (GBR)	3:22.20	
3rd place, bronze medalist(s)	Maria Götze (GER)	3:25.38	
4	Ludivine Loiseau (FRA)	3:27.26	
5	Casey Johnson (USA)	3:31.37	
6	Jiang Fuying (CHN)	3:36.25	
7	Sarah Rose (AUS)	3:36.28	
8	Doramitzi González (MEX)	3:37.14	
