= Swimming at the 2004 Summer Paralympics – Women's 50 metre breaststroke SB3 =

Women's 50m Breaststroke SB3 at the XII Paralympic Games
- Paralympic Swimming
- Venue: Olympic Aquatic Centre
- Dates: 23 September 2004
- Competitors: 9 from 8 nations
- Winning time: 56.20

Medalists
1st place, gold medalist(s)		Mayumi Narita	Japan
2nd place, silver medalist(s)		Margaret McEleny MBE	Great Britain
3rd place, bronze medalist(s)		Marayke Jonkers	Australia

The Women's 50 metre breaststroke SB3 swimming event at the 2004 Summer Paralympics was competed on 23 September. It was won by Mayumi Narita, representing Japan.

== 1st round ==
Qualified for final round

Heat 1

23 Sept. 2004, morning session

Rank	Athlete	Time	Notes
1	Mayumi Narita (JPN)	57.24	
2	Patricia Valle (MEX)	1:08.09	
3	Aimee Bruder (USA)	1:12.73	
4	Takako Fujita (JPN)	1:17.03	

Heat 2

23 Sept. 2004, morning session

Rank	Athlete	Time	Notes
1	Margaret McEleny MBE (GBR)	1:01.77	
2	Marayke Jonkers (AUS)	1:02.96	
3	Rildene Firmino (BRA)	1:14.13	
4	Natalia Popova (RUS)	1:15.68	
5	Sofiya Avramova (UKR)	1:16.11	

== Final round ==
23 Sept. 2004, evening session

Rank	Athlete	Time	Notes
1st place, gold medalist(s)	Mayumi Narita (JPN)	56.20	WR
2nd place, silver medalist(s)	Margaret McEleny MBE (GBR)	1:01.72	
3rd place, bronze medalist(s)	Marayke Jonkers (AUS)	1:02.63	
4	Patricia Valle (MEX)	1:08.14	
5	Aimee Bruder (USA)	1:13.40	
6	Natalia Popova (RUS)	1:14.07	
7	Sofiya Avramova (UKR)	1:15.05	
8	Rildene Firmino (BRA)	1:15.45	
