= Betiana Basualdo =

Argentinian swimmer

Personal information
- Born: 12 May 1976 (age 50) Buenos Aires, Argentina

Sport
- Sport: Paralympic swimming
- Disability class: S2
Medal record
Representing Argentina
Paralympic Games
Gold medal – first place	1996 Atlanta	100m freestyle S2
Silver medal – second place	1996 Atlanta	50m freestyle S2
Bronze medal – third place	1996 Atlanta	50m backstroke S2
Bronze medal – third place	2004 Athens	100m freestyle S2
World Championships
Gold medal – first place	1994 Malta	50m freestyle S1-2
Silver medal – second place	1994 Malta	50m backstroke S1-2
Silver medal – second place	1998 Christchurch	200m freestyle S2
Bronze medal – third place	1998 Christchurch	50m backstroke S2
Bronze medal – third place	2002 Mar del Plata	50m freestyle S2
Bronze medal – third place	2002 Mar del Plata	200m freestyle S2
Bronze medal – third place	2002 Mar del Plata	50m backstroke S2
Parapan American Games
Bronze medal – third place	2007 Rio de Janeiro	200m freestyle S3
Bronze medal – third place	2007 Rio de Janeiro	50m backstroke S3

Betiana Basualdo (born May 12, 1976) is an Argentinian S2 para-swimmer. She has won two gold medals, three silver medals, and six bronze medals between the Paralympic Games and IPC Swimming World Championships.

== Career ==
Basualdo was born on May 12, 1976, in Buenos Aires. Basualdo made her Paralympic debut for Argentina during the 1996 Summer Paralympics at the age of 18. She won three medals during the games; a silver medal in the women’s 50m freestyle, bronze in the 50m backstroke, and gold in the 100m freestyle. Following this, Basualdo competed at the 1998 IPC Swimming World Championships where she won a silver medal in the women's 200 meter freestyle and bronze in the women's 50 meter backstroke.

After failing to medal at the 2000 Summer Paralympics, Basualdo won three bronze medals at the 2002 IPC Swimming World Championships in Argentina. Basualdo eventually returned to the Paralympic podium in 2004 after placing third in the women's 100 m freestyle behind Spain's Sara Carracelas García and Great Britain's Danielle Watts.
