= Sara Carracelas García =

Spanish Paralympic swimmer (born 1981)

Personal information
- Nationality: Spain
- Born: 15 September 1981 (age 44) Guipúzcoa

Sport
- Sport: Swimming
Medal record
Women's swimming
Representing Spain
Paralympic Games
Gold medal – first place	1996 Atlanta	50 m freestyle S2
Gold medal – first place	1996 Atlanta	50 m backstroke S2
Gold medal – first place	2000 Sydney	50 m backstroke S2
Gold medal – first place	2004 Athens	50 m freestyle S2
Gold medal – first place	2004 Athens	100 m freestyle S2
Gold medal – first place	2004 Athens	50 m backstroke S2
Silver medal – second place	2000 Sydney	100 m freestyle S2
Bronze medal – third place	1996 Atlanta	100 m freestyle S2
Bronze medal – third place	2000 Sydney	50 m freestyle S2
Bronze medal – third place	2008 Beijing	50 m backstroke S2
IPC European Championships
Bronze medal – third place	2009 Reykjavik	4x50m medley relay 20pts

Sara Carracelas Garcia (born 15 September 1981 in Guipúzcoa) is an S2 swimmer from Spain. She has cerebral palsy. She started swimming when she was four years old. She competed at the 1996 Summer Paralympics, winning a gold medal in the 50 meter backstroke and the 50 meter freestyle. She also won a bronze in the 100 meter freestyle. She competed at the 2000 Summer Paralympics, winning a gold medal in the 50 meter backstroke a bronze in the 50 meter freestyle and a silver in the 100 meter freestyle. She competed at the 2004 Summer Paralympics. She finished first in the 50 meter backstroke, the 50 meter freestyle and in the 100 meter freestyle. She raced at the 2008 Summer Paralympics, winning a bronze in the 50 meter backstroke. In 2010, she competed at the Tenerife International Open.
