= Sinclair Thomas =

British wheelchair basketball player and coach

Sinclair Thomas (born 26 November 1968) is a former wheelchair basketball player. He was part of the Great Britain team that came fourth at the 2000 Summer Paralympics and won bronze medals at the 2004 event. He retired from playing in 2007 to become head coach of the Wolverhampton Rhinos, and was assistant coach of Great Britain team that won bronze at the 2008 Paralympics.
