= Jan Pike =

Australian equestrian

Personal information
- Born: 10 February 1952 (age 74) Sydney, Australia
Medal record
Equestrian
Paralympic Games
Silver medal – second place	2004 Athens	Mixed Dressage – Championship grade I
Bronze medal – third place	2004 Athens	Mixed Dressage – Freestyle grade I

Jan Pike ' OAM (born 10 February 1952) is a Paralympic equestrian competitor from Australia. She was born in Sydney. Pike won a bronze medal at the 2004 Athens Games in the Mixed Dressage – Freestyle grade I event and a silver medal in the Mixed Dressage – Championship grade I event.

Her horse for these events was named Dr Doulittle. She was also a member of the Australian Paralympic Team at the 2008 Summer Paralympics, the equestrian events of which were held in Hong Kong. She is an Honorary Life member of Equestrian Australia. In June 2021, she was awarded Medal of the Order of Australia (OAM) for service to people with disability.

== Introduction to horseriding ==
Pike, who has quadriplegic cerebral palsy, only started riding at the age of 27 when she took up the sport with Riding for the Disabled NSW and says, "The first time I sat in the saddle and experienced the freedom of movement I fell in love. While riding with RDA NSW, she competed in several State and National Championships.

After leasing her own horse and beginning private lessons in 1999, she was selected to the Paralympic Squad.
