= Beata Drozdowska =

Polish Paralympic swimmer

Personal information
- Born: 8 March 1984 (age 42) Białystok, Poland

Sport
- Country: Poland
- Sport: Paralympic swimming
- Disability class: S9
- Coached by: Piotr Daszuta
Medal record
Paralympic swimming
Representing Poland
Paralympic Games
Silver medal – second place	2000 Sydney	100m backstroke S9
World Championships
Silver medal – second place	2002 Mar del Plata	50m freestyle S9
Silver medal – second place	2002 Mar del Plata	100m backstroke S9
Bronze medal – third place	2002 Mar del Plata	100m freestyle S9

Beata Drozdowska (born 8 March 1984) is a Polish retired Paralympic swimmer who competed in international swimming competitions. She is a Paralympic silver medalist, a double World silver medalist and four-time Polish champion in freestyle swimming, she competed at the 2000 and 2004 Summer Paralympics.
