= Gareth Duke =

British Paralympic swimmer (born 1986)

Personal information
- Full name: Gareth Andrew Duke
- Nationality: Welsh
- Born: 18 June 1986 (age 40) Cwmbran, Wales
- Height: 1.40 m (4 ft 7 in)
- Weight: 60 kg (132 lb)

Sport
- Sport: Swimming
- Strokes: Freestyle, breaststroke
- Coach: Billy Pye
Medal record
| Event | 1st | 2nd | 3rd |
|---|---|---|---|
| Paralympic Games | 1 | 1 | 1 |
| World Championships | 1 | 1 | 3 |
| European Championships | 0 | 0 | 0 |
Swimming
Representing United Kingdom
Paralympic Games
| Gold medal – first place | 2004 Athens | 100m breastroke - SB6 |
| Silver medal – second place | 2008 Beijing | 100 metre breastroke - SB6 |
| Bronze medal – third place | 2008 Beijing | 4x50m freestyle relay - 20pts |
IPC World Championships
| Gold medal – first place | 2006 Durban | 100m breaststroke - SB6 |
| Silver medal – second place | 2002 Mar del Plata | 100m breaststroke - SB5 |
| Bronze medal – third place | 2002 Mar del Plata | 4x50m Freestyle Relay 20 Pts |
| Bronze medal – third place | 2006 Durban | 200m medley - SM6 |
| Bronze medal – third place | 2006 Durban | 4x50m Freestyle Medley 20 Pts |

Gareth Andrew Duke (born 18 June 1986) is a former Paralympic swimmer from Great Britain competing in S6 classification events. Duke attended two Summer Paralympic Games winning gold in the 2004 Summer Paralympics in Athens. Duke has represented Britain at two IPC Swimming World Championships and has also held world records in several events. He is the cousin of para-athlete Kyron Duke.

== Personal history ==
Duke was born on 18 June 1986 in Cwmbran, South Wales. As well as having achondroplasia, Duke was born with Alport syndrome, a kidney disease, and suffers from reducing hearing and asthma. After suffering kidney failure he received a donor kidney in 2006 from his father, but when this failed Duke was forced to go on dialysis. He underwent another kidney transplant in 2010, receiving a kidney from his uncle, however the organ failed after about 16 months in July 2011, resulting in Duke retiring from swimming.

== Personal life ==
In December 2025, Duke was sentenced to six months in prison, suspended for 18 months, after engaging in online sexual activity with a child.
