= Nimrod Zviran =

Israeli Paralympic swimmer

Olympic medal record

Swimming (Paralympics)
Bronze medal – third place	2004 Athens	400m freestyle

Nimrod Zviran (Hebrew: נמרוד צבירן) is an Israeli paralympic champion.

Zviran has had cerebral palsy since birth. He started rehabilitation through sports when he was two years old and joined the Maccabi Tel Aviv swimming team at six. Despite the team being designed for able-bodied athletes, Zviran remained a member until he turned 18. He graduated from high school in Tel Aviv and volunteered for army service at the Ministry of Defense's Comptroller's office.

During his military service, Zviran dedicated himself to practice paralympic swimming. In 2002 he reached 4th place at the World Championship. In the 2004 Summer Paralympics he won a bronze medal in 400m freestyle, reached 4th place in 50m and 6th place in 100m.
