= Alex Hadley =

Australian Paralympic swimmer

Personal information
- Nationality: Australia
- Born: 14 September 1973 (age 52) Staines, England
Medal record
Swimming
Paralympic Games
| Gold medal – first place | 2004 Athens | Men's 4x100 m Medley 34 pts |
| Silver medal – second place | 2004 Athens | Men's 4x100 m Freestyle 34 pts |
IPC Swimming World Championships
| Gold medal – first place | 1998 Christchurch | Men's 4 x 100m Freestyle Open |
| Bronze medal – third place | 1998 Christchurch | Men's 100 m Freestyle S7 |
| Gold medal – first place | 2002 Mar Del Plata | Men's 400 m Freestyle S7 |
| Bronze medal – third place | 2002 Mar Del Plata | Men's 100 m Freestyle S7 |

Alex Hadley (born 14 September 1973) is an Australian Paralympic swimmer from the United Kingdom. He was born in Staines, England. He competed but did not win any medals at the 1996 Atlanta Games. At the 2004 Athens Games, he won a gold medal in the Men's 4 × 100 m Medley 34 pts event and a silver medal in the Men's 4 × 100 m Freestyle 34 pts event. He also competed but did not win any medals at the 2008 Beijing Games.
