= Andrew Lindsay (swimmer) =

British Paralympic swimmer

Personal information
- Nationality: British
- Born: 25 October 1979 (age 46) Dunfermline, Scotland
- Height: 1.67 m (5 ft 6 in) (2008)
- Weight: 57.2 kg (126 lb) (2008)

Sport
- Sport: Swimming
- Club: Incas, Stirling Swim
Medal record
Men's para swimming
Representing Great Britain
Paralympic Games
Gold medal – first place	2000 Sydney	100 m backstroke S7
Gold medal – first place	2004 Athens	100 m backstroke S7
Silver medal – second place	1996 Atlanta	100 m backstroke S7

Andrew Lindsay (born 25 October 1979) is a British paralympic swimmer who has represented Great Britain at four Paralympic Games from 1996 to 2008 winning three medals. He competes in the S7 category.

At the 1996 Paralympic Games in Atlanta Lindsay competed in men's 50, 100 and 400 m freestyle and 100 m backstroke, winning the silver medal in the latter. He repeated the events at the 2000 Games in Sydney, this time winning gold in the 100 m backstroke. In 2004 in Athens he once again took gold in the 100 m backstroke.

He is the current world record holder for the S7 category over 200 m backstroke.

Lindsay was inducted into the Scottish Swimming Hall of Fame in 2018.
