= Danielle Watts =

British Paralympic swimmer (born 1980)

Danielle Swann (née Watts)
Personal information
- Nationality: British
- Born: 13 October 1980 (age 45) Oxford, England, UK
- Height: 1.65 m (5 ft 5 in) (2008)

Sport
- Sport: Swimming
- Club: City of Oxford
Medal record
Women's swimming
Representing Great Britain
Paralympic Games
Silver medal – second place	2004 Athens	100 m freestyle S2
Bronze medal – third place	2004 Athens	50 m freestyle S2
Bronze medal – third place	2004 Athens	50 m backstroke S2

Danielle Watts (born 13 October 1980) is a British Paralympic swimmer who represented Great Britain at three Paralympic Games from 2000 to 2008 winning three medals. She is classified as an S1 category swimmer.

At the 2000 Paralympic Games in Sydney, Watts competed in the women's 50 and 100 m freestyle and 50 m backstroke (all S2 category). She repeated these events at the 2004 Games in Athens, this time winning silver in the 100 m freestyle (S2) and bronze in both the 50 m freestyle (S2) and 50 m backstroke (S2).

She swam in two events at the 2008 Beijing Paralympic Games, finishing 7th in the 50 m backstroke (S2) and 13th in the 50 m freestyle (S3).

She is the current world record holder for the S1 category over 50, 100, and 200 m freestyle and 100 m backstroke.

In 2003, she was awarded Swimming World Magazine's Swimming World's World Disabled Swimmers of the Year.

Danielle married Jamie Swann in 2011 and changed her own surname to Swann. She is a Christian and, in 2011, appeared on BBC News talking about unsuitable housing conditions for disabled people.
