= Swimming at the 2004 Summer Paralympics – Women's 4 × 50 metre medley relay 20pts =

Women swimming event

Women's 4x50m Medley 20 pts at the XII Paralympic Games
- Paralympic Swimming
- Venue: Olympic Aquatic Centre
- Dates: 24 September 2004
- Competitors: 7
- Winning time: 3:16.34

Medalists
| 1st place, gold medalist(s) | | Nyree Lewis; Margaret McEleny MBE; Natalie Jones; Jane Stidever | Great Britain |
| 2nd place, silver medalist(s) | | Vanesa Capo; Teresa Perales; Noelia Garcia; Regina Cachan | Spain |
| 3rd place, bronze medalist(s) | | Mayumi Narita; Noriko Kajiwara; Erika Nara; Takako Fujita | Japan |

The Women's 4 x 50 metre medley relay 20pts swimming event at the 2004 Summer Paralympics was competed on 24 September. It was won by the team representing Great Britain.

== Final round ==
| Rank | Team | Time | Notes |
|---|---|---|---|
| 1st place, gold medalist(s) | Great Britain | 3:16.34 | |
| 2nd place, silver medalist(s) | Spain | 3:31.47 | |
| 3rd place, bronze medalist(s) | Japan | 3:33.11 | |
| 4 | Ukraine | 3:38.42 | |
| 5 | United States | 3:38.62 | |
| 6 | Germany | 3:44.83 | |
| | Mexico | DSQ | |

== Team Lists ==
| Great Britain; Nyree Lewis; Margaret McEleny MBE; Natalie Jones; Jane Stidever | Spain; Vanesa Capo; Teresa Perales; Noelia Garcia; Regina Cachan | Japan; Mayumi Narita; Noriko Kajiwara; Erika Nara; Takako Fujita | Ukraine; Valentyna Riznychenko; Olena Akopyan; Maryna Klemyashova; Sofiya Avramova |
| United States; Melanie Benn; Sarah Castle; Casey Johnson; Cheryl Angelelli | Germany; Maria Goetze; Claudia Knoth; Christina Ziegler; Annke Conradi | Mexico; Virginia Hernandez; Velia Flores; Patricia Valle; Doramitzi Gonzalez | |
