= Swimming at the 2008 Summer Paralympics – Women's 50 metre butterfly S6 =

Women's 50m Butterfly S6 at the XIII Paralympic Games
- Venue: Beijing National Aquatics Center
- Dates: 13 September
- Competitors: 14 from 11 nations
- Winning time: 38.44

Medalists
1st place, gold medalist(s)		Jiang Fuying	China
2nd place, silver medalist(s)		Anastasia Diodorova	Russia
3rd place, bronze medalist(s)		Olena Akopyan	Ukraine

The women's 50m butterfly S6 event at the 2008 Summer Paralympics took place at the Beijing National Aquatics Center on 13 September. There were two heats; the swimmers with the eight fastest times advanced to the final.

== Results ==
=== Heats ===
Competed from 09:21.

==== Heat 1 ====
Rank	Name	Nationality	Time	Notes
1	Olena Akopyan	Ukraine	40.51	Q
2	Sarah Rose	Australia	41.37	Q
3	Doramitzi Gonzalez	Mexico	44.00	
4	Natalie Jones	Great Britain	44.69	
5	Elizabeth Johnson	Great Britain	45.94	
6	Maria Teresa Perales	Spain	48.05	
7	Natallia Shavel	Belarus	48.72	

==== Heat 2 ====
Rank	Name	Nationality	Time	Notes
1	Jiang Fuying	China	39.32	Q, WR
2	Inbal Shwartz	Israel	40.79	Q
3	Anastasia Diodorova	Russia	40.90	Q
4	Eleanor Simmonds	Great Britain	43.69	Q
5	Miranda Uhl	United States	43.98	Q
6	Casey Johnson	United States	43.99	Q
7	Maria Goetze	Germany	44.65	

=== Final ===
Competed at 17:16.

Rank	Name	Nationality	Time	Notes
1st place, gold medalist(s)	Jiang Fuying	China	38.44	WR
2nd place, silver medalist(s)	Anastasia Diodorova	Russia	39.93	
3rd place, bronze medalist(s)	Olena Akopyan	Ukraine	40.72	
4	Sarah Rose	Australia	40.95	
5	Inbal Schwartz	Israel	41.05	
6	Casey Johnson	United States	42.35	
7	Miranda Uhl	United States	42.50	
8	Eleanor Simmonds	Great Britain	43.14	

Q = qualified for final. WR = World Record.
