= Swimming at the 2008 Summer Paralympics – Women's 100 metre backstroke S6 =

Women's 100m Backstroke S6 at the XIII Paralympic Games
- Venue: Beijing National Aquatics Center
- Dates: 9 September
- Competitors: 13 from 12 nations
- Winning time: 1:28.34

Medalists
1st place, gold medalist(s)		Mirjam de Koning-Peper	Netherlands
2nd place, silver medalist(s)		Nyree Lewis	Great Britain
3rd place, bronze medalist(s)		Jiang Fuying	China

The women's 100m backstroke S6 event at the 2008 Summer Paralympics took place at the Beijing National Aquatics Center on 9 September. There were two heats; the swimmers with the eight fastest times advanced to the final.

== Results ==
=== Heats ===
Competed from 09:18.

==== Heat 1 ====
Rank	Name	Nationality	Time	Notes
1	Mirjam de Koning-Peper	Netherlands	1:32.65	Q
2	Jiang Fuying	China	1:33.11	Q
3	Doramitzi Gonzalez	Mexico	1:42.21	Q
4	Maria Goetze	Germany	1:43.11	Q
5	Julia Castelló	Spain	1:44.00	
6	Fanni Illes	Hungary	1:44.37	

==== Heat 2 ====
Rank	Name	Nationality	Time	Notes
1	Nyree Lewis	Great Britain	1:30.34	Q
2	Karina Lauridsen	Denmark	1:33.63	Q
3	Anastasia Diodorova	Russia	1:36.20	Q
4	Miranda Uhl	United States	1:41.74	Q
5	Sarah Bowen	Australia	1:43.98	
6	Inbal Schwartz	Israel	1:48.14	
7	Casey Johnson	United States	1:51.42	

=== Final ===
Competed at 17:12.

Rank	Name	Nationality	Time	Notes
1st place, gold medalist(s)	Mirjam de Koning-Peper	Netherlands	1:28.34	PR
2nd place, silver medalist(s)	Nyree Lewis	Great Britain	1:29.35	
3rd place, bronze medalist(s)	Jiang Fuying	China	1:30.53	
4	Anastasia Diodorova	Russia	1:33.96	
5	Karina Lauridsen	Denmark	1:34.41	
6	Doramitzi Gonzalez	Mexico	1:36.90	
7	Maria Goetze	Germany	1:39.85	
8	Miranda Uhl	United States	1:40.44	

Q = qualified for final. PR = Paralympic Record.
