= Swimming at the 2008 Summer Paralympics – Women's 100 metre freestyle S6 =

Swimming event

Women's 100m Freestyle S6 at the XIII Paralympic Games
- Venue: Beijing National Aquatics Center
- Dates: 8 September
- Competitors: 11 from 8 nations
- Winning time: 1:18.75

Medalists
1st place, gold medalist(s)		Eleanor Simmonds	Great Britain
2nd place, silver medalist(s)		Mirjam de Koning-Peper	Netherlands
3rd place, bronze medalist(s)		Doramitzi Gonzalez	Mexico

The women's 100m freestyle S6 event at the 2008 Summer Paralympics took place at the Beijing National Aquatics Center on 8 September. There were two heats; the swimmers with the eight fastest times advanced to the final.

== Results ==
=== Heats ===
Competed from 09:20.

==== Heat 1 ====
Rank	Name	Nationality	Time	Notes
1	Eleanor Simmonds	Great Britain	1:21.86	Q
2	Natalie Jones	Great Britain	1:23.43	Q
3	Erika Nara	Japan	1:25.17	Q
4	Mhairi Love	Great Britain	1:29.76	
5	Sarah Rose	Australia	1:30.31	

==== Heat 2 ====
Rank	Name	Nationality	Time	Notes
1	Mirjam de Koning-Peper	Netherlands	1:18.56	Q
2	Doramitzi Gonzalez	Mexico	1:23.37	Q
3	Maria Goetze	Germany	1:23.40	Q
4	Miranda Uhl	United States	1:23.73	Q
5	Casey Johnson	United States	1:27.75	Q
6	Luo Alice Hsiao Hung	Chinese Taipei	1:33.64	

=== Final ===
Competed at 17:15.

Rank	Name	Nationality	Time	Notes
1st place, gold medalist(s)	Eleanor Simmonds	Great Britain	1:18.75	
2nd place, silver medalist(s)	Mirjam de Koning-Peper	Netherlands	1:19.29	
3rd place, bronze medalist(s)	Doramitzi Gonzalez	Mexico	1:19.36	
4	Maria Goetze	Germany	1:19.53	
5	Natalie Jones	Great Britain	1:21.53	
6	Erika Nara	Japan	1:21.81	
7	Miranda Uhl	United States	1:22.22	
8	Casey Johnson	United States	1:26.42	

Q = qualified for final.
