= Swimming at the 2008 Summer Paralympics – Women's 50 metre freestyle S6 =

Women's 50m Freestyle S6 at the XIII Paralympic Games
- Venue: Beijing National Aquatics Center
- Dates: 15 September
- Competitors: 13 from 10 nations
- Winning time: 35.60

Medalists
1st place, gold medalist(s)		Mirjam de Koning-Peper	Netherlands
2nd place, silver medalist(s)		Doramitzi Gonzalez	Mexico
3rd place, bronze medalist(s)		Natalie Jones	Great Britain

The women's 50m freestyle S6 event at the 2008 Summer Paralympics took place at the Beijing National Aquatics Center on 15 September. There were two heats; the swimmers with the eight fastest times advanced to the final.

== Results ==
=== Heats ===
Competed from 10:18.

==== Heat 1 ====
Rank	Name	Nationality	Time	Notes
1	Natalie Jones	Great Britain	38.13	Q
2	Doramitzi Gonzalez	Mexico	38.20	Q
3	Miranda Uhl	United States	39.20	Q
4	Sarah Rose	Australia	40.90	
5	Casey Johnson	United States	41.95	
	Jiang Fuying	China		DQ

==== Heat 2 ====
Rank	Name	Nationality	Time	Notes
1	Mirjam de Koning-Peper	Netherlands	36.38	Q
2	Erika Nara	Japan	37.46	Q
3	Eleanor Simmonds	Great Britain	38.39	Q
4	Maria Goetze	Germany	38.70	Q
5	Elizabeth Johnson	Great Britain	39.71	Q
6	Luo Alice Hsiao Hung	Chinese Taipei	44.42	
	Inbal Schwartz	Israel		DNS

=== Final ===
Competed at 19:30.

Rank	Name	Nationality	Time	Notes
1st place, gold medalist(s)	Mirjam de Koning-Peper	Netherlands	35.60	WR
2nd place, silver medalist(s)	Doramitzi Gonzalez	Mexico	36.52	
3rd place, bronze medalist(s)	Natalie Jones	Great Britain	37.21	
4	Maria Goetze	Germany	37.28	
5	Eleanor Simmonds	Great Britain	37.77	
6	Erika Nara	Japan	38.32	
7	Miranda Uhl	United States	39.14	
8	Elizabeth Johnson	Great Britain	39.41	

Q = qualified for final. WR = World Record. DQ = Disqualified. DNS = Did not start.
