= Swimming at the 2004 Summer Paralympics – Women's 100 metre backstroke S6 =

Women's 100m Backstroke S6 at the XII Paralympic Games
- Paralympic Swimming
- Venue: Olympic Aquatic Centre
- Dates: 21 September 2004
- Competitors: 11 from 10 nations
- Winning time: 1:32.03

Medalists
1st place, gold medalist(s)		Nyree Lewis	Great Britain
2nd place, silver medalist(s)		Ludivine Loiseau	France
3rd place, bronze medalist(s)		Doramitzi Gonzalez	Mexico

The Women's 100 metre backstroke S6 swimming event at the 2004 Summer Paralympics was competed on 21 September. It was won by Nyree Lewis, representing Great Britain.

== 1st round ==
Qualified for final round

Heat 1

21 Sept. 2004, morning session

Rank	Athlete	Time	Notes
1	Ludivine Loiseau (FRA)	1:36.93	
2	Anastasia Diodorova (RUS)	1:39.68	
3	Sarah Bowen (AUS)	1:42.62	
4	Maria Goetze (GER)	1:45.49	
5	Vanesa Capo (ESP)	1:48.54	

Heat 2

21 Sept. 2004, morning session

Rank	Athlete	Time	Notes
1	Nyree Lewis (GBR)	1:32.92	PR
2	Doramitzi Gonzalez (MEX)	1:34.58	
3	Jiang Fuying (CHN)	1:38.93	
4	Natalie Jones (GBR)	1:40.53	
5	Inbal Schwartz (ISR)	1:45.23	
6	Natalia Shavel (BLR)	2:15.41	

== Final round ==
21 Sept. 2004, evening session

Rank	Athlete	Time	Notes
1st place, gold medalist(s)	Nyree Lewis (GBR)	1:32.03	PR
2nd place, silver medalist(s)	Ludivine Loiseau (FRA)	1:33.94	
3rd place, bronze medalist(s)	Doramitzi Gonzalez (MEX)	1:34.47	
4	Anastasia Diodorova (RUS)	1:37.06	
5	Natalie Jones (GBR)	1:37.13	
6	Jiang Fuying (CHN)	1:39.56	
7	Sarah Bowen (AUS)	1:40.35	
8	Inbal Schwartz (ISR)	1:46.45	
