= Swimming at the 2004 Summer Paralympics – Women's 100 metre freestyle S5 =

Women's 100m Freestyle S5 at the XII Paralympic Games
- Paralympic Swimming
- Venue: Olympic Aquatic Centre
- Dates: 19 September 2004
- Competitors: 11 from 10 nations
- Winning time: 1:19.96

Medalists
1st place, gold medalist(s)		Teresa Perales	Spain
2nd place, silver medalist(s)		Beatrice Hess	France
3rd place, bronze medalist(s)		Olena Akopyan	Ukraine

The Women's 100 metre freestyle S5 swimming event at the 2004 Summer Paralympics was competed on 19 September. It was won by Teresa Perales, representing Spain.

== 1st round ==
Qualified for final round

Heat 1

19 Sept. 2004, morning session

Rank	Athlete	Time	Notes
1	Beatrice Hess (FRA)	1:21.56	
2	Běla Hlaváčková (CZE)	1:25.80	
3	Katerina Liskova (CZE)	1:32.77	
4	Jane Stidever (GBR)	1:40.96	
5	Maria João Morgado (POR)	1:44.99	

Heat 2

19 Sept. 2004, morning session

Rank	Athlete	Time	Notes
1	Teresa Perales (ESP)	1:19.68	
2	Olena Akopyan (UKR)	1:21.01	
3	Inbal Pezaro (ISR)	1:25.68	
4	Theresa Goh (SIN)	1:40.62	
5	Daila Dameno (ITA)	1:44.52	
6	Takako Fujita (JPN)	1:50.82	

== Final round ==
19 Sept. 2004, evening session

Rank	Athlete	Time	Notes
1st place, gold medalist(s)	Teresa Perales (ESP)	1:19.96	
2nd place, silver medalist(s)	Beatrice Hess (FRA)	1:20.46	
3rd place, bronze medalist(s)	Olena Akopyan (UKR)	1:21.33	
4	Inbal Pezaro (ISR)	1:23.59	
5	Běla Hlaváčková (CZE)	1:25.36	
6	Katerina Liskova (CZE)	1:30.18	
7	Theresa Goh (SIN)	1:39.12	
8	Jane Stidever (GBR)	1:40.80	
