= Swimming at the 2008 Summer Paralympics – Women's 400 metre freestyle S6 =

Women's 400m Freestyle S6 at the XIII Paralympic Games
- Venue: Beijing National Aquatics Center
- Dates: 14 September
- Competitors: 10 from 7 nations
- Winning time: 5:41.34

Medalists
1st place, gold medalist(s)		Eleanor Simmonds	Great Britain
2nd place, silver medalist(s)		Mirjam de Koning-Peper	Netherlands
3rd place, bronze medalist(s)		Maria Goetze	Germany

The women's 400m freestyle S6 event at the 2008 Summer Paralympics took place at the Beijing National Aquatics Center on 14 September. There were two heats; the swimmers with the eight fastest times advanced to the final.

== Results ==
=== Heats ===
Competed from 09:49.

==== Heat 1 ====
Rank	Name	Nationality	Time	Notes
1	Miranda Uhl	United States	6:00.34	Q
2	Maria Goetze	Germany	6:06.49	Q
3	Nyree Lewis	Great Britain	6:13.85	Q
4	Erika Nara	Japan	6:31.92	Q
5	Casey Johnson	United States	6:49.80	

==== Heat 2 ====
Rank	Name	Nationality	Time	Notes
1	Eleanor Simmonds	Great Britain	5:56.24	Q
2	Mirjam de Koning-Peper	Netherlands	5:57.72	Q
3	Doramitzi Gonzalez	Mexico	6:15.97	Q
4	Mhairi Love	Great Britain	6:20.31	Q
5	Fanni Illes	Hungary	6:43.09	

=== Final ===
Competed at 18:16.

Rank	Name	Nationality	Time	Notes
1st place, gold medalist(s)	Eleanor Simmonds	Great Britain	5:41.34	WR
2nd place, silver medalist(s)	Mirjam de Koning-Peper	Netherlands	5:43.76	
3rd place, bronze medalist(s)	Maria Goetze	Germany	5:49.70	
4	Miranda Uhl	United States	5:55.64	
5	Doramitzi Gonzalez	Mexico	6:06.84	
6	Nyree Lewis	Great Britain	6:10.82	
7	Mhairi Love	Great Britain	6:15.31	
8	Erika Nara	Japan	6:26.60	

Q = qualified for final. WR = World Record.
