= Swimming at the 2016 Summer Paralympics – Women's 50 metre freestyle S5 =

Women's 50 metre freestyle S5 at the XV Paralympic Games
- Venue: Olympic Aquatics Stadium
- Dates: 12 September 2016
- Competitors: 16 from 13 nations

Medalists
1st place, gold medalist(s)		Li Zhang	China
2nd place, silver medalist(s)		Joana Maria Silva	Brazil
3rd place, bronze medalist(s)		Běla Hlaváčková	Czech Republic

The women's 50 metre freestyle S5 event at the 2016 Paralympic Games took place on 12 September 2016, at the Olympic Aquatics Stadium. Two heats were held. The swimmers with the eight fastest times advanced to the final.

== Heats ==
=== Heat 1 ===
12:01 12 September 2016:

Rank	Lane	Name	Nationality	Time	Notes
1	4	Joana Maria Silva	Brazil	37.22	Q
2	5	Li Zhang	China	37.37	Q
3	3	Sarah Louise Rung	Norway	41.68	Q
4	6	Anita Fatis	France	41.72	Q
5	2	Susana Ribeiro	Brazil	42.92	
6	7	Alyssa Gialamas	United States	44.48	
7	8	Rui Si Theresa Goh	Singapore	45.45	
8	1	Katalin Engelhardt	Hungary	50.04	

=== Heat 2 ===
12:05 12 September 2016:

Rank	Lane	Name	Nationality	Time	Notes
1	4	Teresa Perales	Spain	37.87	Q
2	6	Mayumi Narita	Japan	39.68	Q
3	3	Inbal Pezaro	Israel	40.82	Q
4	5	Běla Hlaváčková	Czech Republic	41.44	Q
5	2	Cuan Yao	China	41.87	
6	7	Xihan Xu	China	44.12	
7	8	Reka Kezdi	Hungary	45.02	
8	1	Simone Fragoso	Portugal	46.49	

== Final ==
20:35 12 September 2016:

Rank	Lane	Name	Nationality	Time	Notes
1st place, gold medalist(s)	5	Li Zhang	China	36.87	
2nd place, silver medalist(s)	4	Joana Maria Silva	Brazil	37.13	
3rd place, bronze medalist(s)	7	Běla Hlaváčková	Czech Republic	37.37	
4	3	Teresa Perales	Spain	38.13	
5	6	Mayumi Narita	Japan	39.23	
6	2	Inbal Pezaro	Israel	39.73	
7	1	Sarah Louise Rung	Norway	40.42	
8	8	Anita Fatis	France	42.66	
