= Swimming at the 2004 Summer Paralympics – Women's 50 metre freestyle S6 =

Paralympic sports event

Women's 50m Freestyle S6 at the XII Paralympic Games
- Paralympic Swimming
- Venue: Olympic Aquatic Centre
- Dates: 27 September 2004
- Competitors: 13 from 10 nations
- Winning time: 36.14

Medalists
1st place, gold medalist(s)		Doramitzi Gonzalez	Mexico
2nd place, silver medalist(s)		Ludivine Loiseau	France
3rd place, bronze medalist(s)		Erika Nara	Japan

The women's 50 metre freestyle S6 swimming event at the 2004 Summer Paralympics was competed on 27 September. It was won by Doramitzi Gonzalez, representing Mexico.

== 1st round ==
Qualified for final round

Heat 1

27 Sept. 2004, morning session

Rank	Athlete	Time	Notes
1	Doramitzi Gonzalez (MEX)	38.51	
2	Valentyna Riznychenko (UKR)	39.49	
3	Natalie Jones (GBR)	40.10	
4	Mhairi Love (GBR)	40.27	
5	Vanesa Capo (ESP)	41.04	
6	Sarah Bowen (AUS)	42.43	

Heat 2

27 Sept. 2004, morning session

Rank	Athlete	Time	Notes
1	Erika Nara (JPN)	37.66	
2	Ludivine Loiseau (FRA)	38.67	
3	Reeta Peltola (FIN)	39.66	
4	Jeanette Chippington (GBR)	40.83	
5	Stephanie Brooks (USA)	42.80	
6	Sarah Rose (AUS)	42.89	
7	Inbal Schwartz (ISR)	43.00	

== Final round ==
27 Sept. 2004, evening session

Rank	Athlete	Time	Notes
1st place, gold medalist(s)	Doramitzi Gonzalez (MEX)	36.14	
2nd place, silver medalist(s)	Ludivine Loiseau (FRA)	36.43	
3rd place, bronze medalist(s)	Erika Nara (JPN)	37.65	
4	Reeta Peltola (FIN)	39.38	
5	Natalie Jones (GBR)	39.55	
6	Jeanette Chippington (GBR)	39.63	
7	Valentyna Riznychenko (UKR)	39.75	
8	Mhairi Love (GBR)	40.77	
