= Swimming at the 2004 Summer Paralympics – Women's 100 metre freestyle S6 =

Women's 100m Freestyle S6 at the XII Paralympic Games
- Paralympic Swimming
- Venue: Olympic Aquatic Centre
- Dates: 20 September 2004
- Competitors: 16 from 12 nations
- Winning time: 1:17.43

Medalists
1st place, gold medalist(s)		Doramitzi Gonzalez	Mexico
2nd place, silver medalist(s)		Ludivine Loiseau	France
3rd place, bronze medalist(s)		Erika Nara	Japan

The Women's 100 metre freestyle S6 swimming event at the 2004 Summer Paralympics was competed on 20 September. It was won by Doramitzi Gonzalez, representing Mexico.

== 1st round ==
Qualified for final round

Heat 1

20 Sept. 2004, morning session

Rank	Athlete	Time	Notes
1	Reeta Peltola (FIN)	1:23.99	
2	Maria Goetze (GER)	1:25.29	
3	Mhairi Love (GBR)	1:25.76	
4	Stephanie Brooks (USA)	1:28.13	
5	Vanesa Capo (ESP)	1:28.41	
6	Sarah Rose (AUS)	1:30.75	
7	Sarah Bowen (AUS)	1:35.00	
8	Noelia Garcia (ESP)	1:40.32	

Heat 2

20 Sept. 2004, morning session

Rank	Athlete	Time	Notes
1	Doramitzi Gonzalez (MEX)	1:21.57	
2	Ludivine Loiseau (FRA)	1:24.10	
3	Erika Nara (JPN)	1:25.52	
4	Jeanette Chippington (GBR)	1:25.59	
5	Valentyna Riznychenko (UKR)	1:31.09	
6	Inbal Schwartz (ISR)	1:33.14	
7	Brandi Van Anne (USA)	1:44.03	
8	Natalia Shavel (BLR)	1:48.71	

== Final round ==
20 Sept. 2004, evening session

Rank	Athlete	Time	Notes
1st place, gold medalist(s)	Doramitzi Gonzalez (MEX)	1:17.43	WR
2nd place, silver medalist(s)	Ludivine Loiseau (FRA)	1:19.52	
3rd place, bronze medalist(s)	Erika Nara (JPN)	1:22.87	
4	Maria Goetze (GER)	1:23.95	
5	Reeta Peltola (FIN)	1:24.38	
6	Mhairi Love (GBR)	1:26.04	
7	Jeanette Chippington (GBR)	1:27.09	
8	Stephanie Brooks (USA)	1:28.59	
