= Swimming at the 2000 Summer Paralympics – Women's 200 metre individual medley SM6 =

Women's 200m individual medley SM6 at the XI Paralympic Games
- Paralympic Swimming
- Venue: Sydney International Aquatics Centre
- Dates: 20 October 2000

Medalists
1st place, gold medalist(s)		Beatrice Hess	France
2nd place, silver medalist(s)		Erin Popovich	United States
3rd place, bronze medalist(s)		Maria Goetze	Germany

The women's 200m individual medley SM6 event took place on 20 October 2000 in Sydney, Australia.

== Results ==
=== Heat 1 ===
Rank	Athlete	Time	Notes
1	Erin Popovich (USA)	3:22.07	Q, WR
2	Ludivine Loiseau (FRA)	3:41.51	Q
3	Virginie Tripier-Martheau (FRA)	3:58.47	Q
4	Lucy Williams (AUS)	3:59.75	
5	Diana Zambo (HUN)	4:15.00	
6	Katalin Engelhardt (HUN)	4:17.01	

=== Heat 2 ===
Rank	Athlete	Time	Notes
1	Beatrice Hess (FRA)	3:14.09	Q, WR
2	Maria Goetze (GER)	3:33.25	Q
3	Nyree Lewis (GBR)	3:37.06	Q
4	Nora Prochazka (SWE)	3:54.05	Q
5	Brandi Van Anne (USA)	3:59.67	Q
6	Yang Libo (CHN)	4:03.81	
7	Alicia Jenkins (AUS)	4:25.42	

=== Final ===
Rank	Athlete	Time	Notes
1st place, gold medalist(s)	Beatrice Hess (FRA)	3:13.58	WR
2nd place, silver medalist(s)	Erin Popovich (USA)	3:19.87	
3rd place, bronze medalist(s)	Maria Goetze (GER)	3:31.26	
4	Nyree Lewis (GBR)	3:36.54	
5	Ludivine Loiseau (FRA)	3:38.50	
6	Brandi Van Anne (USA)	3:58.53	
7	Virginie Tripier-Martheau (FRA)	3:59.70	
	Nora Prochazka (SWE)		DQ
