= Swimming at the 2004 Summer Paralympics – Women's 400 metre freestyle S6 =

Women's 400m Freestyle S6 at the XII Paralympic Games
- Paralympic Swimming
- Venue: Olympic Aquatic Centre
- Dates: 26 September 2004
- Competitors: 10 from 7 nations
- Winning time: 5:49.18

Medalists
1st place, gold medalist(s)		Doramitzi González	Mexico
2nd place, silver medalist(s)		Mhairi Love	Great Britain
3rd place, bronze medalist(s)		Nyree Lewis	Great Britain

The Women's 400 metre freestyle S6 swimming event at the 2004 Summer Paralympics was competed on 26 September. It was won by Doramitzi González, representing Mexico.

== 1st round ==
Qualified for final round

Heat 1

26 Sept. 2004, morning session

Rank	Athlete	Time	Notes
1	Nyree Lewis (GBR)	6:13.16	PR
2	Doramitzi González (MEX)	6:14.40	
3	Stephanie Brooks (USA)	6:39.98	
4	Noelia García (ESP)	7:10.33	
5	Elizabeth Freiin von Wechmar (RSA)	7:21.61	

Heat 2

26 Sept. 2004, morning session

Rank	Athlete	Time	Notes
1	Erika Nara (JPN)	6:13.77	
2	Mhairi Love (GBR)	6:15.67	
3	Maria Götze (GER)	6:18.38	
4	Vanesa Capó (ESP)	6:43.40	
5	Brandi Van Anne (USA)	7:30.83	

== Final round ==
26 Sept. 2004, evening session

Rank	Athlete	Time	Notes
1st place, gold medalist(s)	Doramitzi González (MEX)	5:49.18	WR
2nd place, silver medalist(s)	Mhairi Love (GBR)	6:02.59	
3rd place, bronze medalist(s)	Nyree Lewis (GBR)	6:05.24	
4	Maria Goetze (GER)	6:09.99	
5	Erika Nara (JPN)	6:14.65	
6	Stephanie Brooks (USA)	6:37.20	
7	Vanesa Capó (ESP)	6:50.40	
8	Noelia García (ESP)	7:03.84	
