= Swimming at the 2004 Summer Paralympics – Women's 50 metre freestyle S5 =

Women's 50m Freestyle S5 at the XII Paralympic Games
- Paralympic Swimming
- Venue: Olympic Aquatic Centre
- Dates: 27 September 2004
- Competitors: 9 from 8 nations
- Winning time: 37.26

Medalists
1st place, gold medalist(s)		Olena Akopyan	Ukraine
2nd place, silver medalist(s)		Beatrice Hess	France
3rd place, bronze medalist(s)		Teresa Perales	Spain

The Women's 50 metre freestyle S5 swimming event at the 2004 Summer Paralympics was competed on 27 September. It was won by Olena Akopyan, representing Ukraine.

== 1st round ==
Qualified for final round

Heat 1

27 Sept. 2004, morning session

Rank	Athlete	Time	Notes
1	Teresa Perales (ESP)	37.42	
2	Běla Hlaváčková (CZE)	38.46	
3	Katerina Liskova (CZE)	43.56	
4	Jane Stidever (GBR)	49.72	

Heat 2

27 Sept. 2004, morning session

Rank	Athlete	Time	Notes
1	Olena Akopyan (UKR)	37.94	
2	Beatrice Hess (FRA)	39.28	
3	Inbal Pezaro (ISR)	41.42	
4	Daila Dameno (ITA)	46.77	
5	Takako Fujita (JPN)	53.27	

== Final round ==
27 Sept. 2004, evening session

Rank	Athlete	Time	Notes
1st place, gold medalist(s)	Olena Akopyan (UKR)	37.26	
2nd place, silver medalist(s)	Beatrice Hess (FRA)	37.53	
3rd place, bronze medalist(s)	Teresa Perales (ESP)	37.62	
4	Běla Hlaváčková (CZE)	38.42	
5	Inbal Pezaro (ISR)	40.71	
6	Katerina Liskova (CZE)	43.83	
7	Daila Dameno (ITA)	45.71	
8	Jane Stidever (GBR)	45.94	
