= Swimming at the 2008 Summer Paralympics – Women's 200 metre individual medley SM6 =

Event at the 2008 Summer Paralympics

Women's 200m Individual Medley SM6 at the XIII Paralympic Games
- Venue: Beijing National Aquatics Center
- Dates: 7 September
- Competitors: 13 from 9 nations
- Winning time: 3:13.05

Medalists
1st place, gold medalist(s)		Miranda Uhl	United States
2nd place, silver medalist(s)		Maria Goetze	Germany
3rd place, bronze medalist(s)		Natalie Jones	Great Britain

The women's 200m individual medley SM6 event at the 2008 Summer Paralympics took place at the Beijing National Aquatics Center on 7 September. There were two heats; the swimmers with the eight fastest times advanced to the final.

== Results ==
=== Heats ===
Competed from 10:07.

==== Heat 1 ====
Rank	Name	Nationality	Time	Notes
1	Miranda Uhl	United States	3:16.95	Q, PR
2	Nyree Lewis	Great Britain	3:26.94	Q
3	Sarah Rose	Australia	3:30.68	Q
4	Anastasia Diodorova	Russia	3:33.32	Q
5	Florence Lancial	France	3:54.35	
6	Casey Johnson	United States	3:56.80	

==== Heat 2 ====
Rank	Name	Nationality	Time	Notes
1	Jiang Fuying	China	3:18.17	Q
2	Eleanor Simmonds	Great Britain	3:19.91	Q
3	Natalie Jones	Great Britain	3:21.34	Q
4	Maria Goetze	Germany	3:25.03	Q
5	Natallia Shavel	Belarus	3:40.74	
6	Sarah Bowen	Australia	3:40.89	
7	Fanni Illes	Hungary	3:58.59	

=== Final ===
Competed at 18:46.

Rank	Name	Nationality	Time	Notes
1st place, gold medalist(s)	Miranda Uhl	United States	3:13.05	WR
2nd place, silver medalist(s)	Maria Goetze	Germany	3:14.59	
3rd place, bronze medalist(s)	Natalie Jones	Great Britain	3:15.20	
4	Jiang Fuying	China	3:15.23	
5	Eleanor Simmonds	Great Britain	3:18.41	
6	Nyree Lewis	Great Britain	3:23.93	
7	Sarah Rose	Australia	3:29.54	
8	Anastasia Diodorova	Russia	3:33.24	

Q = qualified for final. WR = World Record. PR = Paralympic Record.
