= Swimming at the 2004 Summer Paralympics – Women's 100 metre breaststroke SB4 =

Women's 100m Breaststroke SB4 at the XII Paralympic Games
- Paralympic Swimming
- Venue: Olympic Aquatic Centre
- Dates: 24 September 2004
- Competitors: 11 from 11 nations
- Winning time: 1:59.38

Medalists
1st place, gold medalist(s)		Beatrice Hess	France
2nd place, silver medalist(s)		Inbal Pezaro	Israel
3rd place, bronze medalist(s)		Teresa Perales	Spain

The Women's 100 metre breaststroke SB4 swimming event at the 2004 Summer Paralympics was competed on 24 September. It was won by Beatrice Hess, representing France.

== 1st round ==
Qualified for final round

Heat 1

24 Sept. 2004, morning session

Rank	Athlete	Time	Notes
1	Noriko Kajiwara (JPN)	2:01.50	
2	Teresa Perales (ESP)	2:03.28	
3	Katalin Engelhardt (HUN)	2:06.33	
4	Valeria Fantasia (ARG)	2:11.81	
5	Kara Sheridan (USA)	2:19.53	

Heat 2

24 Sept. 2004, morning session

Rank	Athlete	Time	Notes
1	Beatrice Hess (FRA)	2:00.94	
2	Inbal Pezaro (ISR)	2:02.00	
3	Theresa Goh (SIN)	2:02.88	
4	Běla Hlaváčková (CZE)	2:04.58	
5	Karolina Hamer (POL)	2:25.72	
6	Naiver Mercedes Ome (COL)	2:28.04	

== Final round ==
24 Sept. 2004, evening session

Rank	Athlete	Time	Notes
1st place, gold medalist(s)	Beatrice Hess (FRA)	1:59.38	
2nd place, silver medalist(s)	Inbal Pezaro (ISR)	2:00.07	
3rd place, bronze medalist(s)	Teresa Perales (ESP)	2:00.93	
4	Noriko Kajiwara (JPN)	2:01.15	
5	Theresa Goh (SIN)	2:03.93	
6	Běla Hlaváčková (CZE)	2:06.17	
7	Katalin Engelhardt (HUN)	2:08.98	
8	Valeria Fantasia (ARG)	2:12.35	
