= Swimming at the 2004 Summer Paralympics – Women's 50 metre butterfly S6 =

Ludivine Loise dominates Women's 50 metre butterfly at Summer Paralympics

Women's 50m Butterfly S6 at the XII Paralympic Games
- Paralympic Swimming
- Venue: Olympic Aquatic Centre
- Dates: 25 September 2004
- Competitors: 15 from 10 nations
- Winning time: 40.25

Medalists
1st place, gold medalist(s)		Ludivine Loiseau	France
2nd place, silver medalist(s)		Doramitzi Gonzalez	Mexico
3rd place, bronze medalist(s)		Sarah Rose	Australia

The Women's 50 metre butterfly S6 swimming event at the 2004 Summer Paralympics was competed on 25 September. It was won by Ludivine Loiseau, representing France.

== 1st round ==
Qualified for final round

Heat 1

25 Sept. 2004, morning session

Rank	Athlete	Time	Notes
1	Anastasia Diodorova (RUS)	42.81	
2	Doramitzi Gonzalez (MEX)	44.55	
3	Casey Johnson (USA)	44.56	
4	Angel Langner (USA)	45.62	
5	Maria Goetze (GER)	47.16	
6	Dianne Saunders (AUS)	52.32	
7	Erika Nara (JPN)	53.34	

Heat 2

25 Sept. 2004, morning session

Rank	Athlete	Time	Notes
1	Ludivine Loiseau (FRA)	41.59	
2	Jiang Fuying (CHN)	42.20	
3	Sarah Rose (AUS)	42.26	
4	Yang Libo (CHN)	43.82	
5	Liz Johnson (GBR)	46.64	
6	Natalie Jones (GBR)	47.02	
7	Natalia Shavel (BLR)	53.46	
8	Brandi Van Anne (USA)	55.46	

== Final round ==
25 Sept. 2004, evening session

Rank	Athlete	Time	Notes
1st place, gold medalist(s)	Ludivine Loiseau (FRA)	40.25	
2nd place, silver medalist(s)	Doramitzi Gonzalez (MEX)	41.03	
3rd place, bronze medalist(s)	Sarah Rose (AUS)	41.96	
4	Anastasia Diodorova (RUS)	42.62	
5	Jiang Fuying (CHN)	42.98	
6	Yang Libo (CHN)	43.03	
7	Angel Langner (USA)	44.08	
8	Casey Johnson (USA)	45.37	
