= Swimming at the 2016 Summer Paralympics – Women's 200 metre freestyle S5 =

Women's 200 metre freestyle S5 at the XV Paralympic Games
- Venue: Olympic Aquatics Stadium
- Dates: 8 September 2016
- Competitors: 12 from 10 nations

Medalists
1st place, gold medalist(s)		Li Zhang	China
2nd place, silver medalist(s)		Teresa Perales	Spain
3rd place, bronze medalist(s)		Sarah Louise Rung	Norway

The women's 200 metre freestyle S5 event at the 2016 Paralympic Games took place on 8 September 2016, at the Olympic Aquatics Stadium. Two heats were held. The swimmers with the eight fastest times advanced to the final.

== Heats ==
=== Heat 1 ===
11:43 8 September 2016:

Rank	Lane	Name	Nationality	Time	Notes
1	4	Inbal Pezaro	Israel	3:03.35	Q
2	5	Cuan Yao	China	3:04.71	Q
3	3	Joana Maria Silva	Brazil	3:12.16	Q
4	6	Anita Fatis	France	3:14.40	Q
5	7	Chrysoula Antoniadou	Greece	3:48.62	
6	2	Rui Si Theresa Goh	Singapore	4:02.37	

=== Heat 2 ===
11:49 8 September 2016:

Rank	Lane	Name	Nationality	Time	Notes
1	4	Sarah Louise Rung	Norway	2:54.73	Q
2	3	Li Zhang	China	2:55.67	Q
3	5	Teresa Perales	Spain	2:56.53	Q
4	6	Alyssa Gialamas	United States	3:16.22	Q
5	2	Susana Ribeiro	Brazil	3:19.03	
6	7	Reka Kezdi	Hungary	3:36.70	

== Final ==
20:08 8 September 2016:

Rank	Lane	Name	Nationality	Time	Notes
1st place, gold medalist(s)	5	Li Zhang	China	2:48.33	
2nd place, silver medalist(s)	3	Teresa Perales	Spain	2:50.91	
3rd place, bronze medalist(s)	4	Sarah Louise Rung	Norway	2:51.37	
4	2	Cuan Yao	China	3:00.93	
5	6	Inbal Pezaro	Israel	3:03.29	
6	7	Joana Maria Silva	Brazil	3:12.73	
7	8	Alyssa Gialamas	United States	3:15.04	
8	1	Anita Fatis	France	3:18.23	
