= Swimming at the 2016 Summer Paralympics – Women's 100 metre freestyle S5 =

Women's 100 metre freestyle S5 at the XV Paralympic Games
- Venue: Olympic Aquatics Stadium
- Dates: 17 September 2016
- Competitors: 13 from 11 nations

Medalists
1st place, gold medalist(s)		Li Zhang	China
2nd place, silver medalist(s)		Teresa Perales	Spain
3rd place, bronze medalist(s)		Joana Maria Silva	Brazil

The women's 100 metre freestyle S5 event at the 2016 Paralympic Games took place on 17 September 2016, at the Olympic Aquatics Stadium. Two heats were held. The swimmers with the eight fastest times advanced to the final.

== Heats ==
=== Heat 1 ===
11:01 17 September 2016:

Rank	Lane	Name	Nationality	Time	Notes
1	3	Li Zhang	China	1:22.83	Q
2	5	Joana Maria Silva	Brazil	1:24.57	Q
3	4	Sarah Louise Rung	Norway	1:26.41	Q
4	6	Bela Trebinova	Czech Republic	1:27.60	Q
5	2	Alyssa Gialamas	United States	1:37.15	
6	7	Rui Si Theresa Goh	Singapore	1:42.04	

=== Heat 2 ===
11:05 17 September 2016:

Rank	Lane	Name	Nationality	Time	Notes
1	4	Teresa Perales	Spain	1:24.37	Q
2	5	Inbal Pezaro	Israel	1:24.38	Q
3	3	Cuan Yao	China	1:24.44	Q
4	2	Mayumi Narita	Japan	1:26.91	Q
5	6	Anita Fatis	France	1:34.13	
6	1	Reka Kezdi	Hungary	1:40.45	
7	7	Xihan Xu	China	1:40.88	

== Final ==
19:29 17 September 2016:

Rank	Lane	Name	Nationality	Time	Notes
1st place, gold medalist(s)	4	Li Zhang	China	1:18.85	
2nd place, silver medalist(s)	5	Teresa Perales	Spain	1:20.47	
3rd place, bronze medalist(s)	2	Joana Maria Silva	Brazil	1:23.21	
4	6	Cuan Yao	China	1:23.99	
5	3	Inbal Pezaro	Israel	1:24.04	
6	7	Sarah Louise Rung	Norway	1:25.04	
7	1	Mayumi Narita	Japan	1:26.39	
8	8	Bela Trebinova	Czech Republic	1:27.59	
