= Olena Akopyan =

Ukrainian Paralympic competitor

Personal information
- Full name: Olena Hrachykivna Akopyan
- Born: 4 October 1969 (age 56) Yenakiieve, Ukrainian SSR, Soviet Union

Sport
- Sport: Skiing
Medal record
Representing Ukraine
Paralympic Games
Swimming
Gold medal – first place	2004 Athens	50 metre freestyle – S5
Silver medal – second place	1996 Atlanta	50 metre freestyle – S5
Silver medal – second place	1996 Atlanta	100 metre freestyle – S5
Silver medal – second place	1996 Atlanta	200 metre freestyle – S5
Silver medal – second place	2000 Sydney	50 metre freestyle – S5
Silver medal – second place	2000 Sydney	100 metre freestyle – S5
Silver medal – second place	2000 Sydney	200 metre freestyle – S5
Silver medal – second place	2004 Athens	50 metre butterfly – S5
Silver medal – second place	2004 Athens	200 metre freestyle – S5
Bronze medal – third place	2004 Athens	100 metre freestyle – S5
Bronze medal – third place	2008 Beijing	50 metre butterfly – S6
Bronze medal – third place	2008 Beijing	50 metre freestyle – S6
Bronze medal – third place	2008 Beijing	200 metre freestyle - S6
Biathlon
Bronze medal – third place	1998 Nagano	7.5 kilometre sitski - LW10-12
Cross-country skiing
Bronze medal – third place	1998 Nagano	5 kilometre sitski - LW10-12
Swimming
World Championships
Gold medal – first place	1998 Christchurch	50 m butterfly S5
Gold medal – first place	2002 Mar del Plata	200 m medley SM5
Gold medal – first place	2002 Mar del Plata	100 m freestyle S5
Gold medal – first place	2002 Mar del Plata	50 m freestyle S5
Gold medal – first place	2006 Durban	50 m freestyle S5
Gold medal – first place	2006 Durban	200 m freestyle S5
Gold medal – first place	2006 Durban	50 m butterfly S5
Gold medal – first place	2006 Durban	100 m freestyle S5
Silver medal – second place	1998 Christchurch	200 m freestyle S5
Silver medal – second place	1998 Christchurch	50 m freestyle S5
Silver medal – second place	1998 Christchurch	100 m freestyle S5
Silver medal – second place	1998 Christchurch	50 m backstroke S5
Silver medal – second place	2002 Mar del Plata	200 m freestyle S5

Olena Hrachykivna Akopyan (Ukrainian: Олена Грачиківна Акопян, born 4 October 1969) is a Paralympic swimmer from Ukraine competing mainly in category S5 events. She is also one of the rare sportswomen to have competed in both the summer and winter Paralympics having competed in the biathlon and cross-country skiing in the winter Paralympics. The majority of Akopyan's Paralympic success came in the pool where she won thirteen of her fifteen medals including her only gold medal.

== Career ==
At the 1996 Summer Paralympics, Akopyan won three silvers in the 50 metres (160 ft), 100 metres (330 ft) and 200 metres (660 ft) freestyle. Each time she finishing behind France's Beatrice Hess, who set two world records and a Paralympic record in the three events. Akopyan placed sixth in the 100m breaststroke.

At the 1998 Winter Paralympics in Nagano, Akopyan won a bronze in the 7.5 kilometres (4.7 mi) sitski biathlon and the 5 kilometres (3.1 mi) sitski cross-country. She placed fifth in the 10 kilometres (6.2 mi) and fourth in the 2.5 kilometres (1.6 mi) cross-country events.

At the 2000 Summer Paralympics, Akopyan again won silver medals in the 50m, 100m and 200m freestyle including, breaking the Paralympic record in the 50m freestyle first heat only to see Hess break it in the second heat and then set a world record in the final. Akopyan came in fourth in the 50m butterfly and 50m backstroke.

At the 2004 Summer Paralympics, Akopyan won a silver in the 50m butterfly behind Teresa Perales of Spain and another silver in the 200m freestyle behind Hess. She beat Hess to the gold medal in the 50m freestyle. Sheh also picked up a bronze medal in the 200m freestyle, behind both Perales and Hess, and was a member of the Ukrainian 4x50m medley squad that finished fourth. Akopyan was coached by Maryna Kuzmina (Honored coach of Ukraine) from 2001- 2005.

At the 2008 Summer Paralympics, Akopyan broke the World record in the 50m butterfly only to see both China's Fuying Jiang and Russia's Anastasia Diodorova swim quicker in the final leaving her with the bronze medal. She took the bronze medal in the 50m and 200m freestyle and finished fourth in the 100m freestyle.

== Personal life ==
Akopyan was disabled as a teenager as a result of a knife attack in Belgorod, where she had moved to attend a music school. She was married in August 2008. In 2010, she gave birth to a son and daughter.
