= Swimming at the 2016 Summer Paralympics – Women's 50 metre backstroke S5 =

Women's 50 metre backstroke S5 at the XV Paralympic Games
- Venue: Olympic Aquatics Stadium
- Dates: 16 September 2016
- Competitors: 11 from 10 nations

Medalists
1st place, gold medalist(s)		Teresa Perales	Spain
2nd place, silver medalist(s)		Bela Trebinova	Czech Republic
3rd place, bronze medalist(s)		Sarah Louise Rung	Norway

The women's 50 metre backstroke S5 event at the 2016 Paralympic Games took place on 16 September 2016, at the Olympic Aquatics Stadium. Two heats were held. The swimmers with the eight fastest times advanced to the final.

== Heats ==
=== Heat 1 ===
11:24 16 September 2016:

Rank	Lane	Name	Nationality	Time	Notes
1	4	Bela Trebinova	Czech Republic	44.49	Q
2	6	Mayumi Narita	Japan	46.74	Q
3	3	Anita Fatis	France	50.93	Q
4	5	Qi Wu	China	52.52	
5	2	Giulia Ghiretti	Italy	54.68	
6	7	Vladyslava Kravchenko	Malta	1:03.12	

=== Heat 2 ===
11:28 16 September 2016:

Rank	Lane	Name	Nationality	Time	Notes
1	4	Teresa Perales	Spain	44.48	Q
2	6	Li Zhang	China	48.30	Q
3	3	Alyssa Gialamas	United States	48.65	Q
4	5	Sarah Louise Rung	Norway	49.37	Q
5	2	Natallia Shavel	Belarus	50.36	Q

== Final ==
19:58 16 September 2016:

Rank	Lane	Name	Nationality	Time	Notes
1st place, gold medalist(s)	4	Teresa Perales	Spain	43.03	
2nd place, silver medalist(s)	5	Bela Trebinova	Czech Republic	44.51	
3rd place, bronze medalist(s)	7	Sarah Louise Rung	Norway	45.40	
4	6	Li Zhang	China	47.07	
5	3	Mayumi Narita	Japan	47.63	
6	2	Alyssa Gialamas	United States	47.95	
7	8	Anita Fatis	France	49.23	
8	1	Natallia Shavel	Belarus	50.41	
