= Swimming at the 2012 Summer Paralympics – Women's 200 metre freestyle S5 =

Freestyle swimming event

Women's 200 metre Freestyle S5 at the XIV Paralympic Games
- Venue: London Aquatics Centre
- Dates: 1 September
- Competitors: 13 from 11 nations

Medalists
1st place, gold medalist(s)		Sarah Louise Rung	Norway
2nd place, silver medalist(s)		Teresa Perales	Spain
3rd place, bronze medalist(s)		Inbal Pezaro	Israel

The women's 200 metre freestyle S5 event at the 2012 Paralympic Games took place on 1 September, at the London Aquatics Centre.

Two heats were held, one with six swimmers and one with seven swimmers. The swimmers with the eight fastest times advanced to the final.

== Heats ==
=== Heat 1 ===
Rank	Lane	Name	Nationality	Time	Notes
1	4	Inbal Pezaro	Israel	2:57.14	Q
2	5	Anita Fatis	France	3:02.70	Q
3	3	Joana Maria Silva	Brazil	3:16.27	Q
4	6	Aimee Bruder	United States	3:58.00	
5	7	Patricia Valle	Mexico	4:19.57	PR
6	2	Stefania Chiarioni	Italy	4:22.87	

=== Heat 2 ===
Rank	Lane	Name	Nationality	Time	Notes
1	4	Sarah Louise Rung	Norway	2:56.22	Q
2	5	Teresa Perales	Spain	3:05.44	Q
3	6	Alyssa Gialamas	United States	3:15.22	Q
4	3	Lisette Teunissen	Netherlands	3:27.74	Q
5	2	Reka Kezdi	Hungary	3:46.27	Q
6	7	Jaide Childs	United States	4:19.35	
7	1	Valerie Drapeau	Canada	4:56.32	

== Final ==
Rank	Lane	Name	Nationality	Time	Notes
1st place, gold medalist(s)	4	Sarah Louise Rung	Norway	2:49.74	
2nd place, silver medalist(s)	6	Teresa Perales	Spain	2:51.79	
3rd place, bronze medalist(s)	5	Inbal Pezaro	Israel	2:56.11	
4	3	Anita Fatis	France	3:03.81	
5	2	Alyssa Gialamas	United States	3:15.66	
6	7	Joana Maria Silva	Brazil	3:17.43	
7	1	Lisette Teunissen	Netherlands	3:22.67	
8	8	Reka Kezdi	Hungary	3:45.66	
