= Swimming at the 2008 Summer Paralympics – Women's 100 metre breaststroke SB4 =

Women's 100m Breaststroke SB4 at the XIII Paralympic Games
- Venue: Beijing National Aquatics Center
- Dates: 12 September
- Competitors: 10 from 10 nations
- Winning time: 1:55.55

Medalists
1st place, gold medalist(s)		Běla Hlaváčková	Czech Republic
2nd place, silver medalist(s)		Inbal Pezaro	Israel
3rd place, bronze medalist(s)		Teresa Perales	Spain

The women's 100m breaststroke SB4 event at the 2008 Summer Paralympics took place at the Beijing National Aquatics Center on 12 September. There were two heats; the swimmers with the eight fastest times advanced to the final.

== Results ==
=== Heats ===
Competed from 10:09.

==== Heat 1 ====
Rank	Name	Nationality	Time	Notes
1	Inbal Pezaro	Israel	2:01.28	Q
2	Noriko Kajiwara	Japan	2:04.22	Q
3	Teresa Perales	Spain	2:04.68	Q
4	Luo Alice Hsiao-hung	Chinese Taipei	2:06.04	Q
5	Adri Visser	South Africa	2:28.79	

==== Heat 2 ====
Rank	Name	Nationality	Time	Notes
1	Běla Hlaváčková	Czech Republic	1:57.53	Q
2	Theresa Goh	Singapore	2:00.86	Q
3	Katalin Engelhardt	Hungary	2:10.62	Q
4	Naiver Ramos	Colombia	2:20.93	Q
5	Diana Guimarães	Portugal	2:22.77	

=== Final ===
Competed at 18:20.

Rank	Name	Nationality	Time	Notes
1st place, gold medalist(s)	Běla Hlaváčková	Czech Republic	1:55.55	
2nd place, silver medalist(s)	Inbal Pezaro	Israel	1:57.75	
3rd place, bronze medalist(s)	Teresa Perales	Spain	2:01.25	
4	Theresa Goh	Singapore	2:01.99	
5	Noriko Kajiwara	Japan	2:04.22	
6	Luo Alice Hsiao-hung	Chinese Taipei	2:04.88	
7	Katalin Engelhardt	Hungary	2:09.72	
8	Naiver Ramos	Colombia	2:28.28	

Q = qualified for final.
