= Swimming at the 2004 Summer Paralympics – Women's 200 metre freestyle S5 =

Women's 200m Freestyle S5 at the XII Paralympic Games
- Paralympic Swimming
- Venue: Olympic Aquatic Centre
- Dates: 21 September 2004
- Competitors: 9 from 9 nations
- Winning time: 2:49.99

Medalists
1st place, gold medalist(s)		Beatrice Hess	France
2nd place, silver medalist(s)		Olena Akopyan	Ukraine
3rd place, bronze medalist(s)		Inbal Pezaro	Israel

The Women's 200 metre freestyle S5 swimming event at the 2004 Summer Paralympics was competed on 21 September. It was won by Beatrice Hess, representing France.

== 1st round ==
Qualified for final round

Heat 1

21 Sept. 2004, morning session

Rank	Athlete	Time	Notes
1	Olena Akopyan (UKR)	2:59.35	
2	Katerina Liskova (CZE)	3:15.54	
3	Kaley McLean (CAN)	3:41.06	
4	Takako Fujita (JPN)	3:57.69	

Heat 2

21 Sept. 2004, morning session

Rank	Athlete	Time	Notes
1	Beatrice Hess (FRA)	2:52.33	
2	Inbal Pezaro (ISR)	3:05.11	
3	Theresa Goh (SIN)	3:32.21	
4	Maria João Morgado (POR)	3:45.32	
5	Daila Dameno (ITA)	3:53.22	

== Final round ==
21 Sept. 2004, evening session

Rank	Athlete	Time	Notes
1st place, gold medalist(s)	Beatrice Hess (FRA)	2:49.99	
2nd place, silver medalist(s)	Olena Akopyan (UKR)	2:53.86	
3rd place, bronze medalist(s)	Inbal Pezaro (ISR)	2:58.74	
4	Katerina Liskova (CZE)	3:18.55	
5	Theresa Goh (SIN)	3:29.58	
6	Maria João Morgado (POR)	3:41.21	
7	Kaley McLean (CAN)	3:44.21	
8	Daila Dameno (ITA)	3:53.62	
