= Swimming at the 2004 Summer Paralympics – Women's 50 metre butterfly S5 =

Women's 50m Butterfly S5 at the XII Paralympic Games
- Paralympic Swimming
- Venue: Olympic Aquatic Centre
- Dates: 22 September 2004
- Competitors: 8 from 7 nations
- Winning time: 44.70

Medalists
1st place, gold medalist(s)		Teresa Perales	Spain
2nd place, silver medalist(s)		Olena Akopyan	Ukraine
3rd place, bronze medalist(s)		Katalin Engelhardt	Hungary

The Women's 50 metre butterfly S5 swimming event at the 2004 Summer Paralympics was competed on 22 September. It was won by Teresa Perales, representing Spain.

== Final round ==
22 Sept. 2004, evening session

Rank	Athlete	Time	Notes
1st place, gold medalist(s)	Teresa Perales (ESP)	44.70	
2nd place, silver medalist(s)	Olena Akopyan (UKR)	46.57	
3rd place, bronze medalist(s)	Katalin Engelhardt (HUN)	48.88	
4	Diána Zámbó (HUN)	49.50	
5	Běla Hlaváčková (CZE)	50.84	
6	Theresa Goh (SIN)	55.23	
7	Daila Dameno (ITA)	1:04.08	
8	Kaley McLean (CAN)	1:05.25	
