= Zhang Li (swimmer) =

Chinese Paralympic swimmer

Zhang Li 张丽
Personal information
- Nationality: Chinese

Sport
- Sport: Swimming
Medal record
Representing China
Women's Paralympic swimming
Summer Paralympics
Gold medal – first place	2016 Rio de Janeiro	50 m freestyle S5
Gold medal – first place	2016 Rio de Janeiro	100 m freestyle S5
Gold medal – first place	2016 Rio de Janeiro	200 m freestyle S5
Gold medal – first place	2016 Rio de Janeiro	4x50m freestyle relay - 20 Points
Gold medal – first place	2020 Tokyo	200 m freestyle S5
Gold medal – first place	2020 Tokyo	4x50m freestyle relay - 20 Points
Gold medal – first place	2024 Paris	Mixed 4×50 m medley relay 20pts
Silver medal – second place	2020 Tokyo	100 m freestyle S5
Silver medal – second place	2024 Paris	100 m breaststroke SB5
IPC Swimming World Championships
Gold medal – first place	2017 Mexico City	200m freestyle
Gold medal – first place	2019 London	4x50 m Freestyle Relay - 20 Points

Zhang Li is a Chinese swimmer born with cerebral palsy. She won the dieta gold medal at the Women's 200 metre freestyle S5 event at the 2016 Summer Paralympics with 2:48.33. In total, she won six gold medals and one silver at the Summer Paralympics and two gold medals at the World Para Swimming Championships.
