= Daila Dameno =

Italian para-alpine skier, para-archer and para-swimmer (born 1968)

Personal information
- Born: 18 June 1968 (age 58) Milan, Lombardy, Italy

Sport
- Country: Italy
Medal record
Para-archery
Paralympic Games
Bronze medal – third place	2024 Paris	Mixed team W1
World Championships
Silver medal – second place	2023 Plzeň	Women W1 Doubles
European Para Championships
Gold medal – first place	2023 Rotterdam	Women's team W1
Para-alpine skiing
Paralympic Games
Silver medal – second place	2006 Turin	Slalom LW10-2
Bronze medal – third place	2006 Turin	Giant slalom LW10-2

Daila Dameno (born 18 June 1968) is an Italian para-archer, para-alpine skier and para-swimmer. She represented Italy in para-swimming at the 2004 Summer Paralympics and in para-alpine skiing at the 2006 and 2010 Winter Paralympics, the former in which she won two medals, a silver in the slalom and a bronze in the giant slalom.

== Background ==
Dameno was left tetraplegic following a car accident.

== Sporting career ==
=== Para-swimming ===
Dameno represented Italy in the Paralympic swimming competitions at the 2004 Summer Paralympics, finishing 8th in the 200 m freestyle S5, 7th in the 50 m freestyle S5 and 50 m butterfly S5.

=== Para-alpine skiing ===
Dameno also competed in para-lpine skiing, in the 2006 Winter Paralympics, where in the slalom race she achieved a time of 1:49.53, winning the silver medal; on the podium, gold for the American Stephani Victor in 1:48.54 and bronze for the Japanese Tatsuko Aoki in 1:51.39. She came third in the giant slalom race, with a result of 2:08.08, behind Kuniko Obinata in 2:05.03 and Laurie Stephens in 2:05.11.

=== Para-archery ===
In 2022, Dameno started shooting with the compound bow, achieving exceptional results in a short time. She made her debut in her first Italian Championship in Lanciano in 2022, coming in 2nd place both in the qualifications and in the clash with Asia Pellizzari in the W1 category. In Faeza at the Italian Indoor Championships she won the silver medal in the qualification and the title of Italian Indoor Champion. In July 2023, with the call to the national team, she won the silver medal at the 2023 World Championships in Plzeň (CZE) in pairs with Pellizzari, beaten only by the Chinese pair who set the new world record in the Double W1 category. 2024 has also given great satisfaction so far. In Novara, she won the gold in the qualifications and the silver in the final with Pellizzari.
