= Ludivine Loiseau =

French Paralympic swimmer

Personal information
- Born: 27 August 1980 (age 45) Nantua, France

Sport
- Country: France
- Sport: Paralympic swimming
- Disability class: S6
Medal record
Paralympic swimming
Representing France
Paralympic Games
Gold medal – first place	1996 Atlanta	Women's 50m freestyle S6
Gold medal – first place	2000 Sydney	Women's 4x50m medley relay
Gold medal – first place	2004 Athens	Women's 50m butterfly S6
Silver medal – second place	1996 Atlanta	Women's 100m freestyle S6
Silver medal – second place	1996 Atlanta	Women's 200m freestyle S6
Silver medal – second place	1996 Atlanta	Women's 4x50m freestyle relay S1-6
Silver medal – second place	2000 Sydney	Women's 50m butterfly S6
Silver medal – second place	2004 Athens	Women's 50m freestyle S6
Silver medal – second place	2004 Athens	Women's 100m backstroke S6
Silver medal – second place	2004 Athens	Women's 100m freestyle S6
Bronze medal – third place	1996 Atlanta	Women's 200m individual medley SM6
Bronze medal – third place	2000 Sydney	Women's 100m backstroke S6
World Championships
Gold medal – first place	1994 Malta	Women's 50m butterfly S6
Gold medal – first place	1998 Christchurch	Women's 100m backstroke S6
Gold medal – first place	1998 Christchurch	Women's 4x50m medley open
Gold medal – first place	2002 Mar del Plata	Women's 50m freestyle S6
Gold medal – first place	2002 Mar del Plata	Women's 50m butterfly S6
Gold medal – first place	2002 Mar del Plata	Women's 100m freestyle S6
Silver medal – second place	2002 Mar del Plata	Women's 100m backstroke S6
Bronze medal – third place	1994 Malta	Women's 50m freestyle S6
Bronze medal – third place	1994 Malta	Women's 100m backstroke S6
Bronze medal – third place	1994 Malta	Women's 200m freestyle S6
Bronze medal – third place	1994 Malta	Women's 200m individual medley SM6
Bronze medal – third place	1998 Christchurch	Women's 400m freestyle S6
Bronze medal – third place	1998 Christchurch	Women's 4x50m freestyle open

Ludivine Loiseau (born 27 August 1980) is a former French Paralympic swimmer who has competed in three Paralympic Games and has won twelve medals. She was born with a short arm and leg on her right hand side. Loiseau was awarded the Legion of Honor by Jacques Chirac for her medal success in both Paralympic and world championship events.
