= Noriko Kajiwara =

Japanese Paralympic swimmer

Medal record

Women's swimming

Representing Japan

Paralympic Games
Gold medal – first place	1996 Atlanta	50 m backstroke - SB3
Gold medal – first place	2004 Athens	4x400 m relay - 20 pts
Bronze medal – third place	2004 Athens	4x400 m relay - 20 pts

Noriko Kajiwara (梶原 紀子, Kajiwara Noriko) is a Paralympic swimmer from Japan competing mainly in category SB3 events.

Noriko competed in four Paralympic games winning two gold medals and a bronze. At her first games in 1996 Summer Paralympics she won gold in the 50m breaststroke having set a world record in the heat and then improving by over a second in the final. She also finished as ninth fastest in the heats of the 50m freestyle narrowly missing out on a final place, finished eighth in both the 50m backstroke and 100m freestyle finals. In the 2000 Summer Paralympics she could only manage eighth in the 100m breaststroke final and finished sixth in her heat of the 50m freestyle. In the 2004 games Japan entered successful relay teams and Noriko was part of them winning gold in the 4x50m freestyle in a new world-record time and bronze in the 4x50m medley she also swam in the individual 100m breaststroke finishing fourth less than a quarter of a second behind France's Teresa Perales in bronze. At her fourth games she competed in just the 100m breaststroke where she could only manage fifth.
