= Takako Fujita =

Japanese Paralympic swimmer

Medal record

Women's swimming

Representing Japan

Paralympic Games
Gold medal – first place	2000 Sydney	4x400 m relay 20 pts
Gold medal – first place	2004 Athens	4x400 m relay 20 pts
Bronze medal – third place	2004 Athens	4x50 m medley relay 20 pts

Takako Fujita (藤田 多佳子, Fujita Takako) is a paralympic swimmer from Japan competing mainly in category S5 events.

Takako was part of the highly successful Japanese 4x50m freestyle at both the 2000 and 2004 Summer Paralympics that not only won gold medals but also on both occasions broke the world record. At the 2004 games she also swam in the 50m freestyle finishing last in her heat, finished eighth in the 100m and 200m freestyle finals. At the 2004 games she also won a bronze in the 4x50m medley finished last in her heat of the 50m, 100m and 200m freestyle and 50m breaststroke.
