= Mirjam de Koning =

Dutch Paralympic swimmer (born 1969)

Medal record

Women's para swimming

Representing Netherlands

Paralympic Games
Gold medal – first place	2008 Beijing	100 m backstroke S6
Gold medal – first place	2008 Beijing	50 m freestyle S6
Silver medal – second place	2008 Beijing	100 m freestyle S6
Silver medal – second place	2008 Beijing	400 m freestyle S6
Bronze medal – third place	2012 London	100 m backstroke S6

World Championships
Gold medal – first place	2006 Durban	50 m freestyle S6
Silver medal – second place	2010 Eindhoven	50 m freestyle S6
Silver medal – second place	2010 Eindhoven	100 m freestyle S6
Bronze medal – third place	2006 Durban	100 m freestyle S6
Bronze medal – third place	2006 Durban	100 m backstroke S6

Mirjam de Koning (born Peper) (born 16 July 1969 in Amsterdam) is a Dutch paraplegic swimmer.

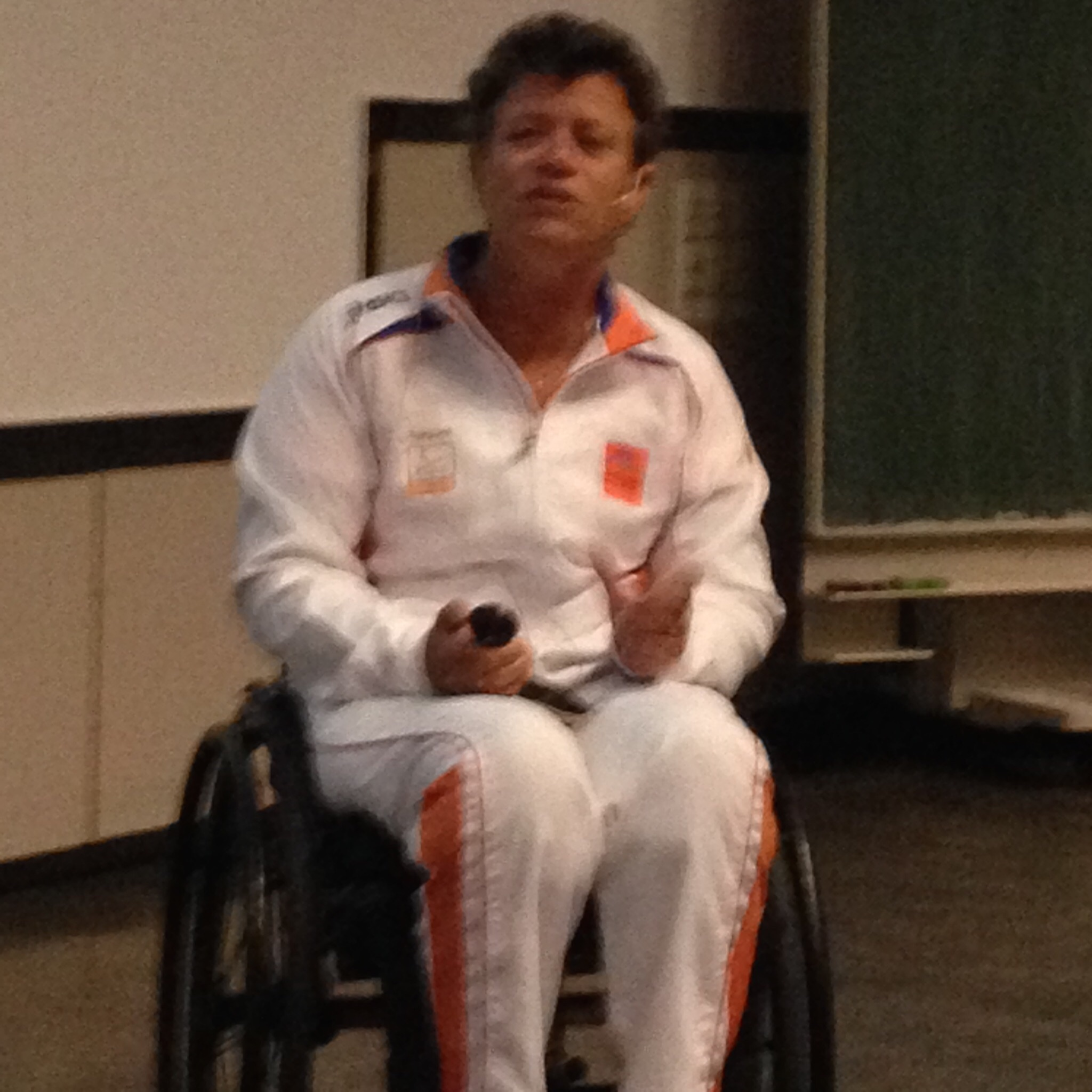
Mirjam de Koning

De Koning was born with damaged connective tissue. After her daughter Sarina was born in 1993, she had seven anterior cruciate ligament surgeries. In 1999 she suffered from a hernia and during a back-surgery and a nerve was damaged. This left her with a form of paraplegia, hence she competes in the S6 classification. Swimming and wheelchair basketball were her sports, but as wheelchair basketball caused a lot of injuries, she decided to mainly focus on swimming. She started to train five times a week with local swim team called Oceanus in Aalsmeer. Not much later she was one of the fastest swimmers at her club, being able to keep up with swimmers without a disability. That year she swam seven Dutch national records in both 25 and 50 metres pools.

In 2005, she was ready to take part in the Dutch national championships, but to participate she had to be a member of the national swimming association. Just a few days before the start she became a member and she won four gold medals, breaking all four Dutch national records as well as a European record. The national records were in the 50 m freestyle, 50 m butterfly and at the 100 m freestyle. The European record and thus fourth Dutch record she swam at the 50m backstroke. De Koning broke her first World Record at the Open Danish swimming championships in Esbjerg, March 2006. She won seven medals at the Championships, of which four golds, one silver and two bronze as well as a new World Record at the 50m backstroke in a time of 45.46 seconds. She also broke another four Dutch national records. She then qualified for the 2006 World Championships in Durban, South Africa and she won two bronze medals. At the 100 m freestyle she swam a time of 1:22.50 and at the 100m backstroke she came to a time of 1:35.26 to take her second bronze. A few days later she became World Champion at the 50m freestyle after winning her race in 37.67 seconds to take her third medal of the Championships. At the 400m freestyle she finished in fourth place.

She represented the Netherlands at the 2008 Summer Paralympics in Beijing for a total of four events. At her first event, the 100m freestyle she won her first round heat in a time of 1:18.56, which was by far the best time of all finalists, with Eleanor Simmonds with 1:21.86 coming in second place. In the final Simmonds managed to improve her time to 1:18.75 while De Koning was only able to swim January 19, 2029 and take the silver, finishing still in front of Paralympic and World Record holder Doramitzi Gonzalez. Later in the week she beat Simmonds in the 50 m freestyle and came second behind Simmonds in the 400 freestyle. She also won a gold medal in the 100 m backstroke event.

== Personal best times ==
Short course
Event	Time	Date	Location
50 m backstroke	47.36	2007-11-17	Houten, Netherlands
50 m breaststroke	58.40	2005-03-26	Gorinchem, Netherlands
50 m freestyle	37.70 WR	2008-02-02	Bussum, Netherlands
75 m medley	1:18.23	2005-02-26	Aalsmeer, Netherlands
100 m backstroke	1:39.85 NR	2005-10-08	Breda, Netherlands
100 m breaststroke	2:10.23 NR	2006-01-22	Deventer, Netherlands
100 m freestyle	1:21.96 WR	2008-02-02	Bussum, Netherlands
100 m medley	1:45.20	2007-11-17	Houten, Netherlands
200 m backstroke	3:35.23 NR	2006-05-06	Delft, Netherlands
200 m breaststroke	4:38.94	2005-02-26	Aalsmeer, Netherlands
200 m freestyle	2:54.08 WR	2008-02-02	Bussum, Netherlands
200 m medley	3.50.47 NR	2006-05-06	Delft, Netherlands
400 m freestyle	6:30.69 NR	2005-10-08	Deventer, Netherlands
800 m freestyle	13:17.54	2007-01-20	Heerenveen, Netherlands
1500 m freestyle	25:33.07	2007-01-21	Heerenveen, Netherlands

Long course
Event	Time	Date	Location
50 m backstroke	43.44 NR	2006-12-02	Durban, South Africa
50 m breaststroke	55.20 NR	2005-06-11	Dordrecht, Netherlands
50 m butterfly	57.33 NR	2006-06-03	Eindhoven, Netherlands
50 m freestyle	36.86	2008-03-09	Esbjerg, Denmark
100 m backstroke	1:32.72 NR	2006-02-12	Durban, South Africa
100 m freestyle	1:19.69 NR	2008-03-07	Esbjerg, Denmark
200 m freestyle	3.06.00 NR	2006-06-10	Brno, Czech Republic
200 m medley	3:45.18 NR	2006-06-10	Brno, Czech Republic
400 m freestyle	5:57.68 NR	2008-05-25	Berlin, Germany
800 m freestyle	12:22.49 WR	2008-05-22	Berlin, Germany

== See also ==
- List of IPC world records in swimming
- List of Paralympic records in swimming
- Netherlands at the 2008 Summer Paralympics
- Swimming at the 2008 Summer Paralympics
