= Alyssa Gialamas =

American Paralympic swimmer

Personal information
- Born: December 5, 1995 (age 30) Oaklawn, Rhode Island, U.S.
- Home town: Naperville, Illinois, U.S.
- Height: 5 ft 4 in (163 cm)
- Weight: 105 lb (48 kg)

Sport
- Country: United States
- Sport: Paralympic swimming
- Disability: Arthrogryposis
- Disability class: S5, SB4, SM5
- Club: Loyola University Maryland
- Coached by: Brian Loeffler
Medal record
Paralympic swimming
Representing United States
World Championships
| Bronze medal – third place | 2013 Montreal | Women's 4x50m medley relay |
Parapan American Games
| Silver medal – second place | 2011 Guadalajara | Women's 50m freestyle S5 |
| Silver medal – second place | 2011 Guadalajara | Women's 100m freestyle S5 |
| Silver medal – second place | 2011 Guadalajara | Women's 200m freestyle S5 |
| Silver medal – second place | 2011 Guadalajara | Women's 50m backstroke S5 |
| Silver medal – second place | 2019 Lima | Women's 200m freestyle S5 |

Alyssa Gialamas (born December 5, 1995) is an American Paralympic swimmer who competes in backstroke and freestyle swimming events in international level events.
