= Inbal Pezaro =

Israeli Paralympic swimmer

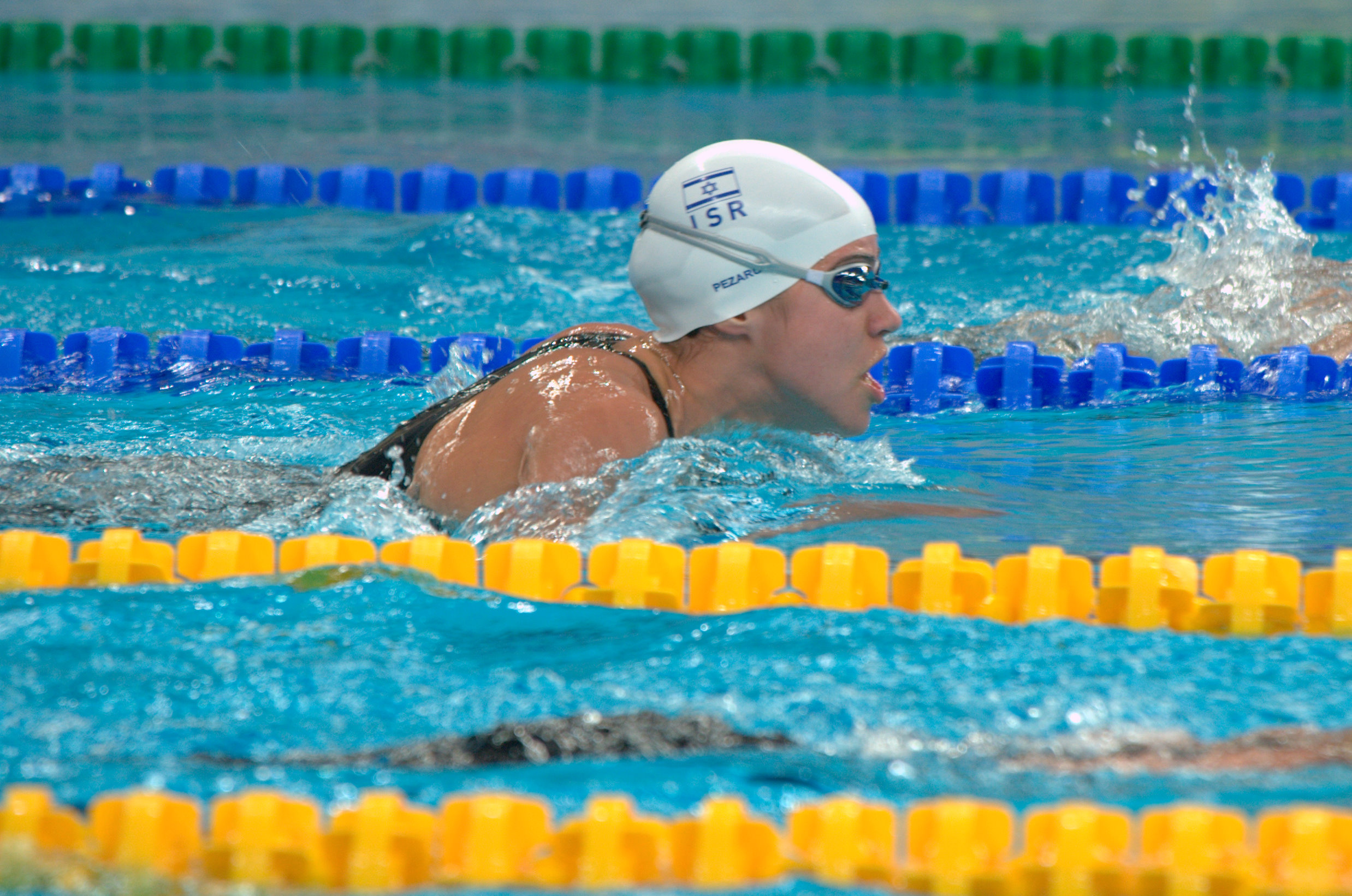
- Pezaro competing at the Beijing Paralympics in 2008

Personal information
- Native name: ענבל פיזרו
- Nationality: Israeli
- Born: 26 March 1987 (age 39) Yizre'el, Israel

Sport
- Sport: Swimming
- Strokes: freestyle backstroke breaststroke
- Club: ILAN Haifa
- Coach: Noah Ram
Medal record
Event	1st	2nd	3rd
Paralympic Games	0	4	5
IPC World Championships	3	6	3
IPC European Championships	3	2	5
Women's para swimming
Representing Israel
Paralympic Games
Silver medal – second place	2004 Athens	100 m breaststroke SB4
Silver medal – second place	2008 Beijing	100 m freestyle S5
Silver medal – second place	2008 Beijing	200 m freestyle S5
Silver medal – second place	2008 Beijing	100 m breaststroke SB4
Bronze medal – third place	2004 Athens	200 m freestyle S5
Bronze medal – third place	2012 London	50 m freestyle S5
Bronze medal – third place	2012 London	100 m freestyle S5
Bronze medal – third place	2012 London	200 m freestyle S5
Bronze medal – third place	2016 Rio de Janeiro	200 m medley SM5
World Championships
Gold medal – first place	2002 Mar del Plata	100 m breaststroke SB4
Gold medal – first place	2006 Durban	100 m breaststroke SB4
Gold medal – first place	2010 Eindhoven	100 m freestyle S5
Silver medal – second place	2006 Durban	100 m freestyle S5
Silver medal – second place	2006 Durban	200 m freestyle S5
Silver medal – second place	2010 Eindhoven	200 m freestyle S5
Silver medal – second place	2013 Montreal	200 m freestyle S5
Silver medal – second place	2015 Glasgow	200 m freestyle S5
Silver medal – second place	2015 Glasgow	200 m medley SM5
Bronze medal – third place	2015 Glasgow	50 m freestyle S5
Bronze medal – third place	2017 Mexico City	50 m freestyle S5
Bronze medal – third place	2017 Mexico City	100 m freestyle S5
European Championships
Gold medal – first place	2009 Reykjavik	200 m freestyle S5
Gold medal – first place	2014 Eindhoven	200 m freestyle S5
Gold medal – first place	2018 Dublin	200 m freestyle
Silver medal – second place	2014 Eindhoven	50 m freestyle S5
Silver medal – second place	2016 Funchal	200 m medley SM5
Bronze medal – third place	2014 Eindhoven	100 m freestyle S5
Bronze medal – third place	2016 Funchal	100 m freestyle S5
Bronze medal – third place	2016 Funchal	200 m freestyle S5
Bronze medal – third place	2018 Dublin	100 m freestyle
Bronze medal – third place	2018 Dublin	200 m medley

Inbal Pezaro (Hebrew: ענבל פיזרו; born 26 March 1987) is an Israeli Paralympic swimmer.

== Biography ==
Pezaro was born on Kibbutz Yizre'el. At birth she suffered from a complex with blood vessels at her spinal cord, which caused her to become paralyzed in her lower limbs. At the age of five she began practicing sports at the ILAN center in Haifa, progressing to compete in national championships only six years later.

== Swimming career ==
From the age of 12 Pezaro had been competing in international swimming competitions. Following her exemption from military service with the Israel Defense Forces (IDF), she volunteered to service and was certified as a swimming instructor.

She took part at the 2004 Summer Paralympics, 2008 Summer Paralympics, 2012 Summer Paralympics and 2016 Summer Paralympics.

At the 2012 Paralympic Games, Pezaro won a silver medal on the opening day, after coming in second place in the 100-meter freestyle competition. She set a new Israeli record with 1:12.57 minutes. Pezaro claimed her second medal, finishing second in the 200 meters freestyle S5 competition. Bela Hlaváčková of the Czech Republic beat Pezaro in the women's 100 breast SB4, giving Inbal her third silver medal of the Beijing Paralympics.

Pezaro emerged as one of the country's biggest stars in the Paralympics in Beijing. She won a bronze medal in the 2016 Rio Paralympics 200 meter freestyle, coming in at 3:38.20 minutes.

== Honors ==
In 2002, she was honored to light a torch at the national Independence Day celebrations. In 2007, she was awarded "Sportswoman of the Year" title by the Israeli Association for Disabled Sports.
