= Anita Fatis =

French Paralympic swimmer

Personal information
- Born: 10 September 1963 (age 62) Dunkirk, France

Sport
- Country: France
- Sport: Paralympic swimming
- Disability: Multiple sclerosis
- Disability class: S5
- Event(s): Backstroke; Freestyle swimming
- Club: Association Thionvilloise Handisport
- Coached by: Cyril Bourdeau
Medal record
Paralympic swimming
Representing France
World Championships
| Bronze medal – third place | 2010 Eindhoven | Women's 50m freestyle S5 |
| Bronze medal – third place | 2010 Eindhoven | Women's 100m freestyle S5 |
European Championships
| Gold medal – first place | 2014 Eindhoven | Women's 50m backstroke S5 |
| Gold medal – first place | 2014 Eindhoven | Women's 50m freestyle S5 |
| Gold medal – first place | 2016 Funchal | Women's 50m freestyle S5 |
| Silver medal – second place | 2011 Berlin | Women's 50m backstroke S5 |
| Bronze medal – third place | 2011 Berlin | Women's 50m freestyle S5 |

Anita Fatis (born 10 September 1963) is a French Paralympic swimmer who competes in backstroke and freestyle swimming events in international level events. She is also a political candidate to become a mayor of Thionville.
