= Doramitzi González =

Mexican Paralympic swimmer

Personal information
- Born: 4 January 1983 (age 43) Morelia, Mexico

Sport
- Country: Mexico
- Sport: Paralympic swimming
- Disability: Limb deficiency
- Disability class: S6
- Coached by: Fernando Velez
- Retired: 2017
Medal record
Paralympic swimming
Representing Mexico
Paralympic Games
Gold medal – first place	2000 Sydney	Women's 50m freestyle S6
Gold medal – first place	2000 Sydney	Women's 100m backstroke S6
Gold medal – first place	2004 Athens	Women's 50m freestyle S6
Gold medal – first place	2004 Athens	Women's 100m freestyle S6
Gold medal – first place	2004 Athens	Women's 400m freestyle S6
Silver medal – second place	2000 Sydney	Women's 100m freestyle S6
Silver medal – second place	2004 Athens	Women's 50m butterfly S6
Silver medal – second place	2008 Beijing	Women's 50m freestyle S6
Bronze medal – third place	2000 Sydney	Women's 50m butterfly S6
Bronze medal – third place	2004 Athens	Women's 100m backstroke S6
Bronze medal – third place	2008 Beijing	Women's 100m freestyle S6
World Championships
Gold medal – first place	2006 Durban	Women's 100m freestyle S6
Silver medal – second place	2006 Durban	Women's 50m freestyle S6
Silver medal – second place	2006 Durban	Women's 400m freestyle S6
Silver medal – second place	2006 Durban	Women's 4x50m freestyle relay
Bronze medal – third place	2006 Durban	Women's 4x50m medley relay
Parapan American Games
Gold medal – first place	2011 Guadalajara	Women's 50m freestyle S6
Gold medal – first place	2011 Guadalajara	Women's 100m freestyle S6
Gold medal – first place	2015 Toronto	Women's 50m freestyle S6
Gold medal – first place	2015 Toronto	Women's 100m freestyle S6
Silver medal – second place	2011 Guadalajara	Women's 400m freestyle S6
Silver medal – second place	2011 Guadalajara	Women's 100m backstroke S6
Silver medal – second place	2015 Toronto	Women's 100m backstroke S6
Bronze medal – third place	2015 Toronto	Women's 400m freestyle S6

Doramitzi González Hernández Nació (born 4 January 1983) is a Mexican former Paralympic swimmer and former world record holder.
