= Vanesa Capó Pérez =

Spanish swimmer

Personal information
- Nationality: Spain
- Born: 3 October 1982 (age 43) Balearic Islands

Sport
- Sport: Swimming
Medal record
Women's swimming
Representing Spain
Paralympic Games
Silver medal – second place	2004 Athens	4x50m medley relay 20pts

Vanesa Capó Pérez (born October 3, 1982, in Balearic Islands) is an S6 swimmer from Spain. She has cerebral palsy. She competed at the 2000 Summer Paralympics. She competed at the 2004 Summer Paralympics, where she earned a silver medal in the 4 x 50 meter Relay 20pts race.
