= Inbal Schwarz =

Israeli Paralympic swimmer

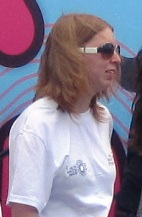
- Schwarz at the London Paralympics in 2012

Personal information
- Native name: ענבל שוורץ
- Nationality: Israeli
- Born: 13 October 1984 (age 41)

Sport
- Sport: Swimming
- Strokes: freestyle backstroke butterfly
- Coach: Noah Ram (national)
Medal record
Representing Israel
Swimming
IPC World Championships
Bronze medal – third place	2010 Eindhoven	50m butterfly S6
IPC European Championships
Gold medal – first place	2009 Reykjavik	50m butterfly S6

Inbal Schwarz (Hebrew: ענבל שוורץ; born October 13, 1984) is an Israeli Paralympic swimmer.

Schwarz, suffering from cerebral palsy, began practicing disabled sports at the Israel Sports Center for the Disabled at a young age. By the age of 15 she was competing internationally, finishing in 4th place at the 2002 IPC Swimming World Championships in 100 meters. Schwarz then volunteered to serve at the IDF, trained as a swimming instructor. Today (2008) she is a student in departments of communications and management.

Schwarz took part in the 2004 Summer Paralympics, participating in tournaments for 100m backstroke (8th place), 100m freestyle (6th place in heats) and 50m freestyle (7th place in heats). At the 2006 world championship she was 4th in the 50m butterfly tournament, while winning a bronze medal at the 2010 IPC Swimming World Championships in the 50m butterfly - S6. Her achievements in 2007 tournaments (including 4th place in 100m freestyle and 5th place in 50m freestyle) qualified her to take part in the 2008 Summer Paralympics.
