= Sarah Rose (swimmer) =

Australian Paralympic swimmer

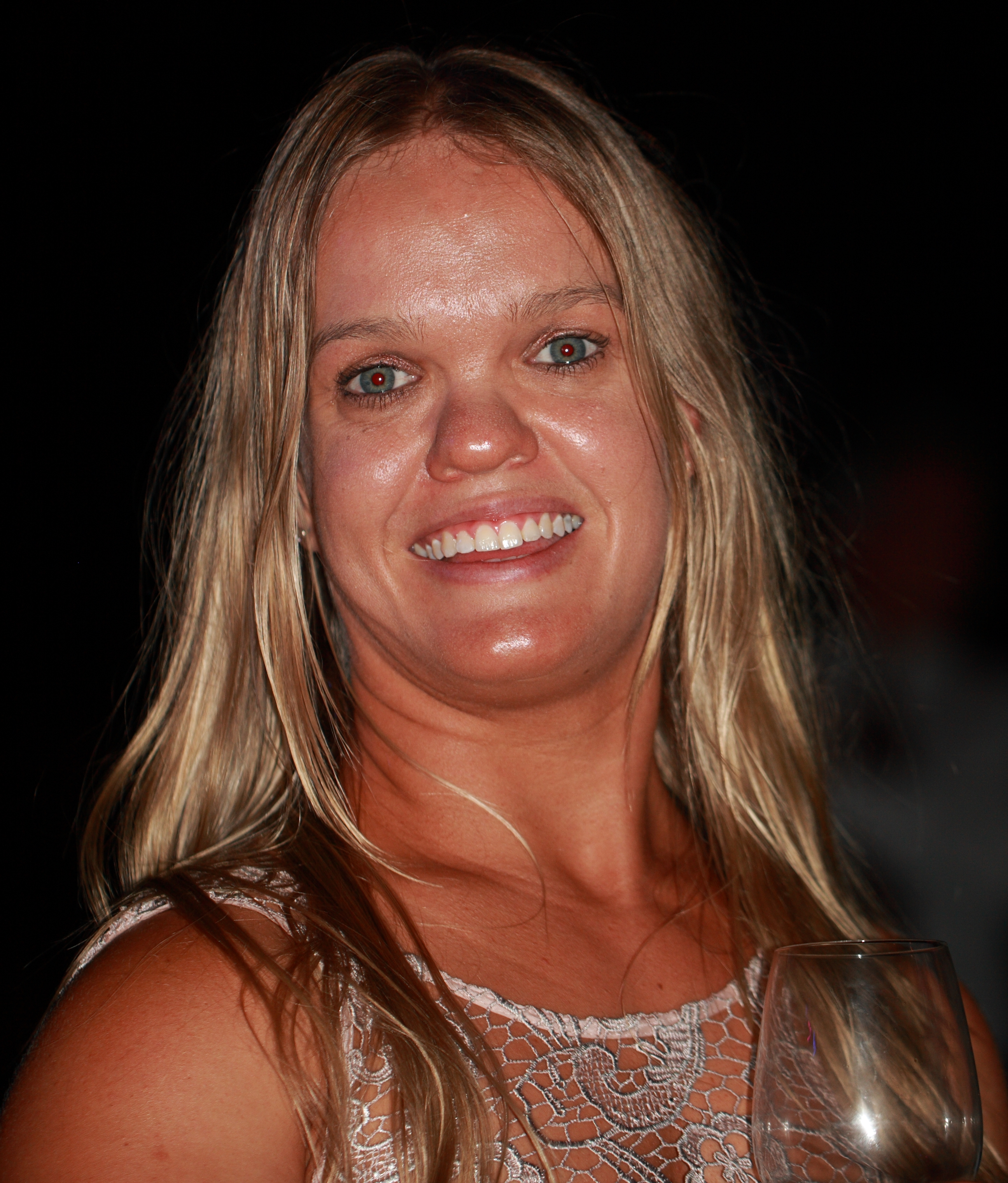
- Sarah Rose in November 2012

Personal information
- Full name: Sarah Rose
- Nationality: Australia
- Born: 18 February 1986 (age 40) Sydney, New South Wales, Australia

Sport
- Sport: Swimming
- Strokes: Freestyle, butterfly
- Classifications: S8, SB7, SM8
Medal record
Women's paralympic swimming
Representing Australia
Paralympic Games
Bronze medal – third place	2004 Athens	50 m butterfly S6
World Championships (LC)
Silver medal – second place	2006 Durban	50 m butterfly S6

Sarah Rose (born 18 February 1986) is a Paralympic swimming competitor from Australia. She was born in Sydney with dwarfism. At the 2004 Athens Games, she competed in four events and won a bronze medal in the Women's 50 m Butterfly S6 event. At the 2008 Beijing Games she competed in four events.

At the 2006 IPC Swimming World Championships, she won a silver medal in the Women's 50m Butterfly S6.

In 2012, she made a comeback after a serious back injury and achieved her aim of selection for the Australian team to represent at the 2012 London Games.

She was an Australian Institute of Sport paralympic swimming scholarship holder from 2004 to 2009. She works as an administrative assistant for The House with No Steps, an organisation set up to help disabled people.

In 2016, she was awarded Speedo Services to the Australian Swim Team at the Swimming Australia Awards.

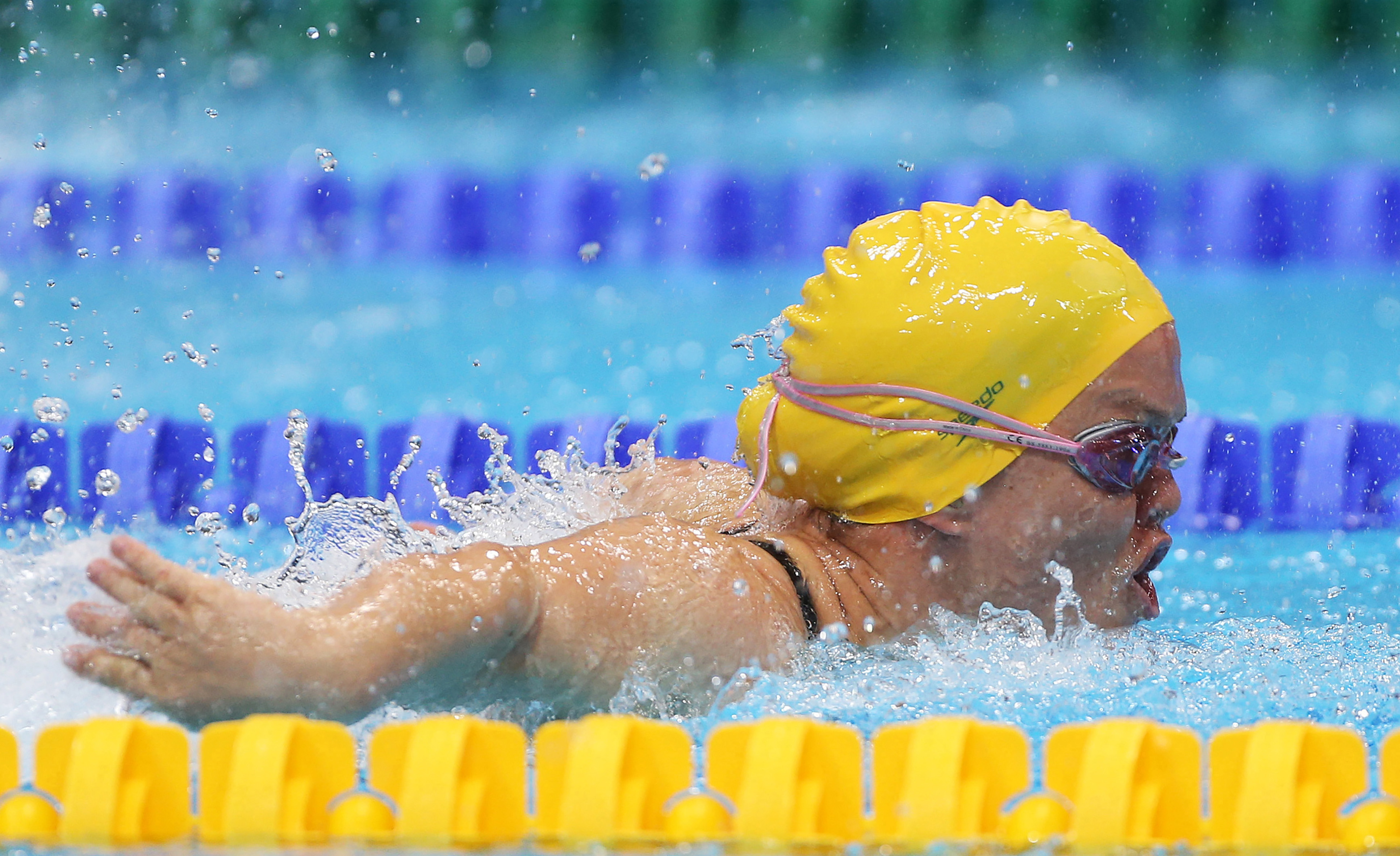
Rose at the 2012 London Paralympics

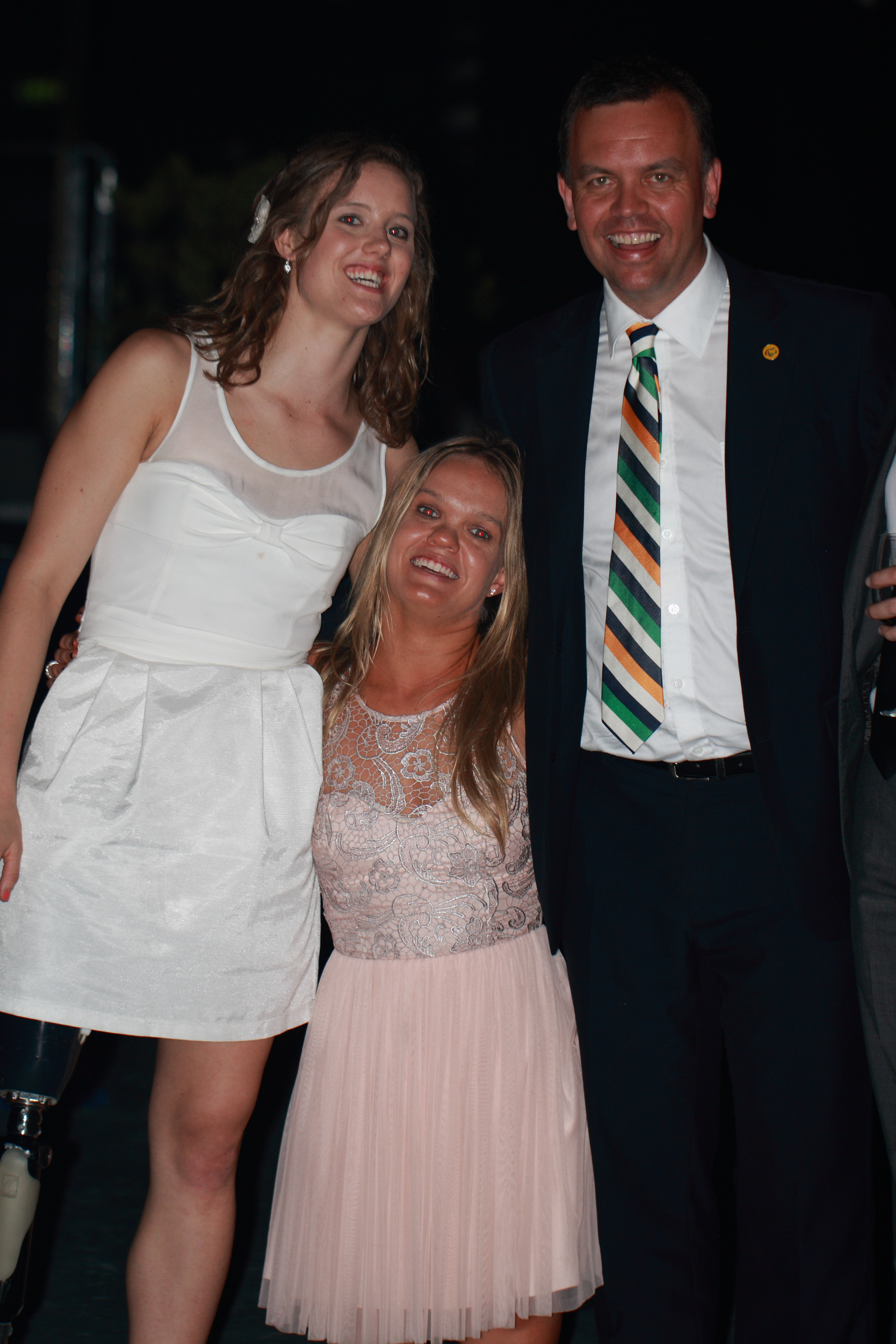
Rose with Ellie Cole and Jason Hellwig at the 2012 Australian Paralympian of the Year ceremony
