= Erika Nara =

Japanese Paralympic swimmer

Medal record

Swimming

Representing Japan

Paralympic Games
Gold medal – first place	2000 Sydney	4x400 metre relay - 20 points
Gold medal – first place	2004 Athens	4x400 metre relay - 20 points
Bronze medal – third place	2004 Athens	4 x 50 metre medley relay - 20 points
Bronze medal – third place	2004 Athens	50 metre freestyle - S6
Bronze medal – third place	2004 Athens	100 metre freestyle - S6

Asian Para Games
Gold medal – first place	2018 Jakarta	Mixed 4×50 m freestyle relay-20Points

Erika Nara (奈良 恵里加, Nara Erika; born 1978 in Maebashi, Gunma) is a Paralympic swimmer from Japan, competing mainly in category S6 events.

Nara was part of the Japanese team that broke the world record in the 4 x 50 m freestyle at the 2000 Summer Paralympics, At the same games she also finished fourth in the 100 m freestyle, sixth in the 400 m freestyle and finished fifth in her heat of the 50 m butterfly. She was also at the Paralympics in 2004, where she was again part of the Japanese 4 x 50 m freestyle team that broke the world record and finished third as part of the Japanese squad in the 4 x 50 m medley. She won bronze medals in both the 50 m and 100 m freestyle, finished fourth in the 400 m freestyle and finished last in the 50m butterfly. In 2008 she finished sixth in the 50 m and 100 m freestyle and eighth in the 400 m freestyle.
