= Miranda Uhl =

American Paralympic swimmer (born 1992)

Personal information
- Nationality: United States
- Born: October 15, 1992 (age 33) Gainesville, Florida, United States
- Height: 4 ft 2 in (1.27 m)

Sport
- Sport: Swimming
- Strokes: Individual medley, butterfly, freestyle, backstroke
- Club: Gator Swim Club
Medal record
Women's swimming
Representing United States
Paralympic Games
Gold medal – first place	2008 Beijing	200 m individual medley
Paralympic World Cup
Bronze medal – third place	2007 Manchester	100 m butterfly
Parapan American Games
Gold medal – first place	2007 Rio de Janeiro	50 m butterfly
Gold medal – first place	2007 Rio de Janeiro	100 m backstroke
Gold medal – first place	2007 Rio de Janeiro	100 m breaststroke
Gold medal – first place	2007 Rio de Janeiro	100 m breaststroke
Gold medal – first place	2007 Rio de Janeiro	200 m individual medley
Gold medal – first place	2007 Rio de Janeiro	400 m freestyle
Silver medal – second place	2007 Rio de Janeiro	500 m freestyle
Silver medal – second place	2007 Rio de Janeiro	100 m backstroke
Silver medal – second place	2007 Rio de Janeiro	4 x 100 metre medley

Miranda Uhl (born October 15, 1992) is an American Paralympic swimmer. She won a gold medal at the 2008 Summer Paralympics. At the Parapan American Games, Uhl won six gold medals and three silver medals.

Born with achondroplasia, Uhl began to swim competitively at ten years old. She competed in the 2007 Parapan Games, where she won 8 medals.

== Personal life ==
Uhl was born to Deanna and Alan Uhl on October 15, 1992. A day after being born, Uhl was determined to have achondroplasia, restricting the growth of her limbs. She has a younger sister. When she was ten years old, Uhl started swimming competitively. She joined the Dwarf Athletic Association of America (DAAA) and started preparing for the Paralympics.

At twelve years old, she joined the Gator Swim Club with Jennifer Davis as her coach. When she was fifteen years old, Uhl started having excruciating pain in her back and knees. Her coach, Jennifer Davis, convinced her to postpone surgery to straighten her spine. The surgery would have prevented Uhl from competing in the 2008 Summer Paralympics, and Davis told her that anything could happen to her between the 2008 and 2012 Paralympics that might prevent her from competing in later Paralympics. According to Davis, "she's just an amazing swimmer — if she were normal size she'd be one of the best in the world, easily — and I would hate to see her lose an opportunity like this." Miranda Uhl swam two hours a day, six days a week.

In middle school, Uhl attended St. Patrick's Catholic School in Gainesville, Florida. She attended St. Francis High School, which is also in Gainesville, Florida. Her hometown is in Alachua, Florida. She attended Florida Atlantic University, where she joined the swim team and was a biology–pre-medical major.

== Swimming career ==
Miranda Uhl competed on the 2007 U.S. Parapan American swimming team. She won eight medals at the Parapan Games, five were gold and three were silver. In the 2008 Summer Paralympics, Miranda Uhl won a gold medal in the 200-meter individual medley. She broke the world record in that competition with a 3:13.05 finish.
