= Nyree Kindred =

Welsh Paralympic swimmer

Nyree Kindred MBE
Personal information
- Full name: Nyree Elise Kindred
- Nationality: Welsh
- Born: 21 September 1980 (age 45) Rhondda, Wales
- Height: 1.60 m (5 ft 3 in)

Sport
- Sport: Swimming
- Club: Leominster Kingfisher
Medal record
Women's swimming
Representing Great Britain
Paralympic Games
| Gold medal – first place | 2004 Athens | 100 m backstroke S6 |
| Gold medal – first place | 2004 Athens | 4×50 m medley 20 pts |
| Silver medal – second place | 2000 Sydney | 100 m backstroke S6 |
| Silver medal – second place | 2004 Athens | 100 m breaststroke SB5 |
| Silver medal – second place | 2004 Athens | 200 m ind. medley SM6 |
| Silver medal – second place | 2008 Beijing | 100 m backstroke S6 |
| Silver medal – second place | 2012 London | 100 m backstroke S6 |
| Bronze medal – third place | 2000 Sydney | 100 m breaststroke SB5 |
| Bronze medal – third place | 2000 Sydney | 400 m freestyle S6 |
| Bronze medal – third place | 2000 Sydney | 4×50 m medley 20 pts |
IPC World Championships
| Gold medal – first place | 2002 Mar del Plata | 100 m backstroke S6 |
| Gold medal – first place | 2002 Mar del Plata | 4x100 m medley relay 20pts |
| Gold medal – first place | 2006 Durban | 100 m backstroke S6 |
| Gold medal – first place | 2006 Durban | 100 m breaststroke SB5 |
| Silver medal – second place | 2002 Mar del Plata | 100 m breaststroke SB5 |
| Silver medal – second place | 2002 Mar del Plata | 200 m medley SM6 |
| Bronze medal – third place | 2006 Durban | 200 m medley SM6 |
| Bronze medal – third place | 2010 Eindhoven | 4×50 m medley 20 pts |
IPC European Championships
| Gold medal – first place | 2009 Reykjavik | 100 m backstroke S6 |

Nyree Elise Kindred MBE (née Lewis; born 21 September 1980 in Rhondda, Wales) is a Welsh swimmer who has competed in the Paralympic Games on four occasions winning ten medals.

== Early life ==
Kindred took up swimming at the age of 5, having been taken to a swimming pool by her aunt. Kindred has a form of cerebral palsy and therefore competes in the S6 (butterfly, backstroke, freestyle), SM6 (medley) and SB5 (breaststroke) classifications.

== Paralympic career ==
Kindred's first appearance at a Paralympics came at the 2000 Games in Sydney, where she won 3 medals, 2 silver and a bronze.

At the 2004 Summer Paralympics Kindred won her first Paralympic gold medal in the S6 100 metres backstroke event, in a new Paralympic record time of 1:32.03. She followed this up with another gold in the 4×50 m medley 20 pts relay, silver medals in both the 100 m breaststroke SB5 and 200 m SM6 individual medley, and a bronze in the 400 m freestyle S6.

In the 100 metres S6 backstroke at the 2008 Paralympic Games in Beijing Kindred was beaten into second place by Dutch swimmer Mirjam de Koning-Peper. Kindred explained her defeat by saying "My legs were spasming, but to be honest, there are no excuses for that, ... I should have gone quicker but it just wasn't there tonight". In addition to this medal winning performance Kindred also reached the finals of the 100 m breaststroke SB5 (finishing 4th), 200 m SM6 individual medley (finishing 6th) and 400 m freestyle S6 (finishing 6th). In April 2012 she qualified for the 2012 Summer Paralympics in the S6 100m backstroke. In the final she finished second to collect the silver medal with a time of 1:26.23.

On top of her success at the Paralympics, Kindred has won seven International Paralympic Committee World Championship medals and seven European Championship medals.

== Personal life ==
Kindred's husband is fellow British Paralympic gold medal-winning swimmer Sascha Kindred. Together the pair, who live in Herefordshire, are known as the "golden couple" of British disability swimming. The couple's first child, Ella, was born in 2011. Kindred was appointed Member of the Order of the British Empire (MBE) in the 2009 Birthday Honours for services to disability sport.

== See also ==
- List of Paralympic records in swimming
- Great Britain at the 2008 Summer Paralympics
- Swimming at the 2000 Summer Paralympics
- Swimming at the 2004 Summer Paralympics
- Swimming at the 2008 Summer Paralympics
