= Natalie Jones (swimmer) =

British Paralympic swimmer (born 1984)

Personal information
- Full name: Natalie Jones
- Nationality: British (English)
- Born: 31 October 1984 (age 41) Colchester, England

Sport
- Sport: Swimming
- Club: Manchester HPC
Medal record
Swimming
Representing Great Britain
Paralympic Games
Gold medal – first place	2004 Athens	200 m individual medley S6
Gold medal – first place	2004 Athens	50 m medley relay (20 pts)
Bronze medal – third place	2008 Beijing	50 m freestyle S6
Bronze medal – third place	2008 Beijing	200 m individual medley S6
Bronze medal – third place	2012 London	200 m individual medley SM6
IPC World Championships
Bronze medal – third place	2010 Eindhoven	50 m freestyle S6
Bronze medal – third place	2010 Eindhoven	400 m freestyle S6
Bronze medal – third place	2010 Eindhoven	200 m individual medley SM6
Bronze medal – third place	2010 Eindhoven	4x50 m medley relay 20Pts
IPC European Championships
Silver medal – second place	2009 Reykjavik	100 m freestyle – S6
Silver medal – second place	2009 Reykjavik	400 m freestyle – S6
Silver medal – second place	2009 Reykjavik	200 m individual medley SM6

Natalie Jones (born 31 October 1984) is a British Paralympic swimmer. She competes in S6 classification events and has represented Great Britain at four Paralympics winning five medals, including two golds at Athens in 2004.

== Career history ==
Jones was born in Colchester, England, and after being delivered via an emergency caesarean she failed to breathe for the first nine minutes of her life. Jones, who has cerebral palsy, was first introduced to the sport of swimming by a school teacher at the age of ten. At the age of 15, she was selected for the Great Britain team at the 2000 Summer Paralympics in Sydney, becoming the swimming squad's youngest member. She competed in four events at Sydney, with her best result being in the 4x50m Medley Relay (20pts), where she and her teammates finished 6th.

In 2004, Jones moved from her homebase in Colchester to Manchester where she joined Manchester HPC. Later that year she was re-selected to represent Great Britain at the 2004 Summer Paralympics in Athens. She took part in six events, finishing on the podium twice. She won the gold in both the 200m Individual Medley (SM6) and as part of the 4x50m Medley Relay (20pts) along with Nyree Lewis, Maggie McEleny and Jane Stidever.

Jones continued to compete at an international level, and won two gold medals and a silver at the 2006 IPC World Championships held in South Africa. By 2008 Jones was in a relationship with fellow Paralympian Rik Waddon, and both qualified for the 2008 Summer Paralympics in Beijing. Jones won another two medals, this time a pair of bronzes in the 50m Freestyle (S6) and the 200m Individual Medley (SM6). Waddon also medalled, with a silver in the 1 km time trial.

At the 2009 IPC World Swimming Championships in Rio de Janeiro, Jones won medals in all five of the events she entered. She took bronze in the 50m Butterfly (S6), silver in the 50m Freestyle (S6), 100m Freestyle (S6) and her favoured 200m Individual Medley 100m and a gold in the Individual Medley (SM6). She followed this with four bronzes at the 2010 IPC World Championships in Eindhoven. She married Waddon in 2010. They are each the subject of a Lego minifigure.

Jones was selected for her fourth Paralympics, after making the team for the 2012 Games in London. At London Jones was selected for five events. She qualified for three finals, the 100m freestyle (S6), 400m freestyle (S6) and the 200m individual medley (SM6). She finished seventh in both 100m and 400m freestyle events and took bronze in the 200m individual medley, finishing just 0.01 seconds behind Verena Schott of Germany who took the silver medal.
