= Béatrice Hess =

French Paralympic swimmer (born 1961)

Medal record

Women's para swimming (S5)

Representing France

Paralympic Games
| Gold medal – first place | 1984 New York | 25 m backstroke C3 |
| Gold medal – first place | 1984 New York | 25 m freestyle C3 |
| Gold medal – first place | 1984 New York | 50 m freestyle C3 |
| Gold medal – first place | 1984 New York | 100 m freestyle C3 |
| Gold medal – first place | 1988 Seoul | 25 m backstroke L1 |
| Gold medal – first place | 1996 Atlanta | 50 m backstroke S5 |
| Gold medal – first place | 1996 Atlanta | 50 m butterfly S5 |
| Gold medal – first place | 1996 Atlanta | 50 m freestyle S5 |
| Gold medal – first place | 1996 Atlanta | 100 m freestyle S5 |
| Gold medal – first place | 1996 Atlanta | 200 m freestyle S5 |
| Gold medal – first place | 1996 Atlanta | 200 m individual medley SM5 |
| Gold medal – first place | 2000 Sydney | 50 m backstroke S5 |
| Gold medal – first place | 2000 Sydney | 50 m butterfly S5 |
| Gold medal – first place | 2000 Sydney | 50 m freestyle S5 |
| Gold medal – first place | 2000 Sydney | 100 m freestyle S5 |
| Gold medal – first place | 2000 Sydney | 200 m freestyle S5 |
| Gold medal – first place | 2000 Sydney | 200 m individual medley SM6 |
| Gold medal – first place | 2000 Sydney | 4×50 m medley relay 20 pts |
| Gold medal – first place | 2004 Athens | 100 m breaststroke SB4 |
| Gold medal – first place | 2004 Athens | 200 m freestyle S5 |
| Silver medal – second place | 1988 Seoul | 50 m freestyle L1 |
| Silver medal – second place | 1996 Atlanta | 4×50 m freestyle S1–6 |
| Silver medal – second place | 2004 Athens | 50 m backstroke S5 |
| Silver medal – second place | 2004 Athens | 50 m freestyle S5 |
| Silver medal – second place | 2004 Athens | 100 m freestyle S5 |

Béatrice Pierre Hess (born 10 November 1961 in Colmar) is a French Paralympic swimmer. The French newspaper L'Humanité has described her as "one of the best swimmers in the world",

Competing at the Paralympic Games, Hess won four gold medals in 1984, one in 1988, six in 1996, and seven in 2000. She also broke nine world records at the 2000 Paralympics in Sydney. At the 2004 Games, she won two gold and three silver medals.

Hess has cerebral palsy, and competes in the S5 disability classification.

== See also ==
- Athletes with most gold medals in one event at the Paralympic Games
