= Teresa Perales =

Spanish Paralympic swimmer

The Most Illustrious Teresa Perales 1st Marchioness of Perales
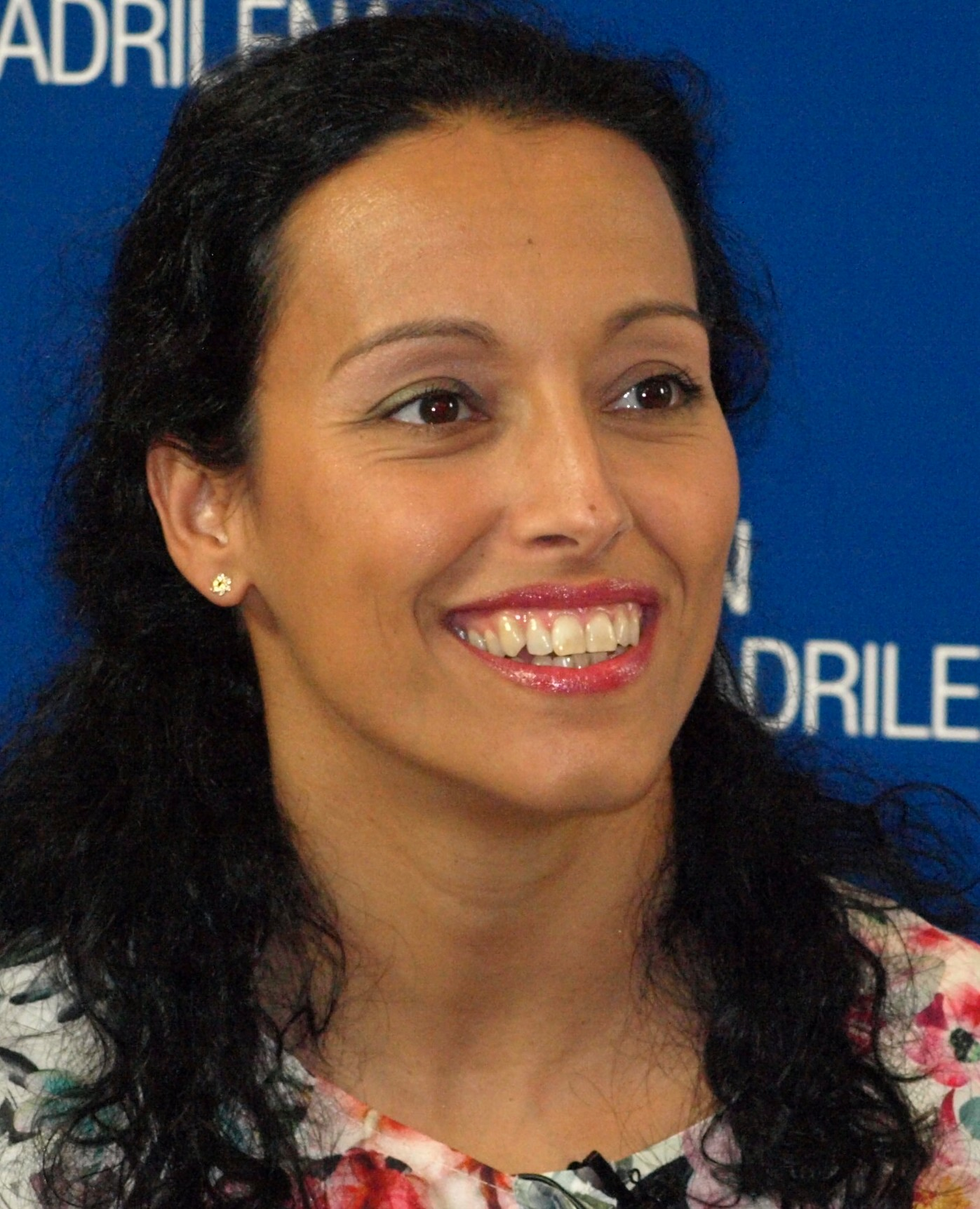

Personal information
- Full name: Teresa Perales Fernández
- Nationality: Spain
- Born: 29 December 1975 (age 50) Zaragoza, Spain
- Website: TeresaPerales.es

Sport
- Sport: Swimming
- Disability: paraplegia impaired muscular power in arm
- Disability class: S2
- Club: CD Asser: Spain
Medal record
Women's para swimming
Representing Spain
Paralympic Games
Gold medal – first place	2004 Athens	100 m freestyle
Gold medal – first place	2004 Athens	50 m butterfly
Gold medal – first place	2008 Beijing	50 m freestyle
Gold medal – first place	2008 Beijing	100 m freestyle
Gold medal – first place	2008 Beijing	200 m freestyle
Gold medal – first place	2012 London	100 m freestyle
Gold medal – first place	2016 Rio de Janeiro	50 m backstroke
Silver medal – second place	2000 Sydney	50 m butterfly
Silver medal – second place	2004 Athens	4x50 m relay
Silver medal – second place	2008 Beijing	50 m backstroke
Silver medal – second place	2012 London	50 m freestyle
Silver medal – second place	2012 London	200 m freestyle
Silver medal – second place	2012 London	50 m butterfly
Silver medal – second place	2016 Rio de Janeiro	200 m freestyle
Silver medal – second place	2016 Rio de Janeiro	200 m medley
Silver medal – second place	2016 Rio de Janeiro	100 m freestyle
Silver medal – second place	2020 Tokyo	50 m backstroke
Bronze medal – third place	2000 Sydney	50 m freestyle
Bronze medal – third place	2000 Sydney	100 m freestyle
Bronze medal – third place	2000 Sydney	200 m freestyle
Bronze medal – third place	2000 Sydney	50 m backstroke
Bronze medal – third place	2004 Athens	50 m freestyle
Bronze medal – third place	2004 Athens	50 m backstroke
Bronze medal – third place	2004 Athens	100 m breaststroke
Bronze medal – third place	2008 Beijing	100 m breaststroke
Bronze medal – third place	2012 London	100 m breaststroke
Bronze medal – third place	2012 London	200 m medley
Bronze medal – third place	2024 Paris	50 m backstroke S2
World Championships
Gold medal – first place	2015 Glasgow	50 m freestyle S5
Silver medal – second place	2015 Glasgow	200 m butterfly S5
Silver medal – second place	2015 Glasgow	50 m freestyle S5
Silver medal – second place	2025 Singapore	200 m freestyle S2
Bronze medal – third place	2015 Glasgow	200 m freestyle S5
Bronze medal – third place	2015 Glasgow	200 m medley SM5
European Championships
Gold medal – first place	2014 Eindhoven	50 m freestyle S5
Gold medal – first place	2014 Eindhoven	50 m backstroke S5
Gold medal – first place	2014 Eindhoven	100 m freestyle S5
Gold medal – first place	2014 Eindhoven	4x50 m mixed freestyle relay 20pts
Gold medal – first place	2016 Funchal	100 m freestyle S5
Gold medal – first place	2016 Funchal	50 m backstroke S5
Gold medal – first place	2016 Funchal	100m freestyle relay 34pts
Silver medal – second place	2014 Eindhoven	100 m freestyle relay 34pts
Silver medal – second place	2016 Funchal	200 m freestyle S5
Silver medal – second place	2016 Funchal	50 m butterfly S5
Silver medal – second place	2026 Kocaeli	100 m backstroke S2
Silver medal – second place	2026 Kocaeli	50 m freestyle S3
Silver medal – second place	2026 Kocaeli	100 m freestyle S3
Bronze medal – third place	2016 Funchal	200m medley SM5
Bronze medal – third place	2016 Funchal	Mixed 50m medley relay 20pts
Bronze medal – third place	2026 Kocaeli	50 m breaststroke SB2

Teresa Perales Fernández, 1st Marchioness of Perales (born 29 December 1975), is an S2 classified Spanish swimmer, politician and motivational speaker who has won a total of 28 Paralympic medals at the 2000, 2004, 2008, 2012, 2016, 2020 and 2024 Summer Paralympics. She is the most decorated Spanish Paralympian in history, and holds the current Paralympic record in women's 100m freestyle (S2) following the 2024 Summer Paralympics.

In 1995, at the age of nineteen, Perales was diagnosed with neuropathy and lost the use of her legs within three months. Following the 2000 Games, she earned a Diploma in Physiotherapy and married Mariano Menor. She later had a child with him following the 2008 Games. In addition to swimming, Perales has been a politician, teacher, entrepreneur and motivational speaker. As an Aragonese Party (PAR) politician, she was in office from 2003 to 2007. Following her departure, she co-wrote an autobiography with her husband. Despite having no plans to return to politics, she was symbolically on the 2011 ballot for PAR as a member of the Congreso de los Diputados. Perales has supported a number of causes including Doctors Without Borders, Fundación Carlos Sanz and Fundación Vicente Ferrer.

Taking up swimming at the age of 19, she joined the Aragon-based disability sport club CAI CDM a year later. A year after that, in 1997, she competed in her first Spanish championships, in which she earned several medals. The following year, she made her national team debut at the IPC (International Paralympic Committee) Swimming World Championships in Christchurch, New Zealand, where she earned a bronze medal. She then went on to compete in the 1999 European Championship, 2000 Summer Paralympics, 2001 European Championships, 2002 IPC World Championship, 2004 Summer Paralympics, 2006 IPC World Swimming Championship, and 2008 Summer Paralympics. She took a break from swimming following the 2008 Games to give birth to her son. She returned to the pool in 2011 for the European Championship and then competed at the 2012 Summer Paralympics. She earned at least one medal in every Paralympics, European Championship, and World Championship in which she competed.

Because of her sporting achievements, Perales was awarded the Gran Cruz del Mérito Deportivo and the Medalla de Oro de la Real Orden del Mérito Deportivo. She has earned several other honors including being named the Woman of the Year by the Spanish women's magazine Mujer hoy.

== Personal ==
Perales was born in Zaragoza on 29 December 1975. She has one sibling, a brother, who is seven years younger than her. When she was 15 years old, her father died from leukemia, and she was then raised by her single mother. At the age of 19, she developed neuropathy and lost feeling in her legs over a three-month period. The condition is relatively rare, and doctors did not initially know how to treat it. Instead, they were waiting to see how it progressed before deciding on the proper treatment. When she left the hospital for the first time in a wheelchair, she was embarrassed because she felt a need to explain to others the events that led to her becoming a paraplegic. She has very little leg strength and no sensation in her legs, and if she cuts herself while shaving her legs, she cannot feel the cut. Prior to contracting neuropathy, she was an active karate practitioner. The last time she was able to walk without assistance was on 10 May 1995 during the celebration of Zaragoza's la Recopa victory. Perales earned a Diploma in Physiotherapy, which she earned from the Universidad de Zaragoza where she was a student from 1996 to 1999.

Perales is married to Mariano Menor and has one child, a son. Perales met her husband, a journalist, during the 2000 Sydney Paralympics because he was interviewing her. They started dating following those Games. He proposed to Perales at the Eiffel Tower following a taxi ride to the location and a limo ride back to a Paris hotel. She married him in 2004 after the Athens Paralympics. She had problems selecting a wedding dress because some interfered with her ability to roll in her wheel chair. She got married in the Basilica of Our Lady of the Pillar in 2005. She stood up from her wheelchair in order to take her vows. The ceremony was attended by a number of high-ranking political figures. She had her son after the 2008 Beijing Paralympics.

Perales was an Aragonese Party politician. She served as the directora general for Ayuda a la Dependencia in 2003 after having been approached to run following her success at the Sydney Paralympics. She served as the Deputy of Cortes de Aragón from June 2003 to February 2006. She left office in 2007, has no plans to return and does not consider herself very political. In 2008, she worked as an adviser and Sports Development in Zaragoza. In 2008, she also served as the executive of Las juventudes del PAR. In this role, she served as the president of the ninth Rolde Choben Congress. She ventured back into politics on a symbolic level in 2011 when she was on the ballot for PAR as a member of the Congress of Deputies. She has also served as the CEO of Care Dependence on the Government of Aragon.

In 2007, Perales co-wrote an autobiography with her husband about her life titled Mi Vida Sobre Ruedas, (Note: "My Life on Wheels") attending at least one event to promote the book. In 2012 in Madrid, she participated in a demonstration against the government to oppose cuts to the disability sector as they were cutting benefits to people with disabilities, a category of people who were facing high unemployment.

Perales is a teacher, entrepreneur and motivational speaker. She spent two years teaching at the Universidad de Zaragoza. She has spoken at the Universidad San Jorge de Zaragoza. She was the president of Fundación Pilotos 4x4 sin Fronteras from 2004 to 2006. She has visited the desert several times, and faced difficulties using the toilet, and solved this problem by creating a special chair for this which involves a robe and a hole in the bottom of the chair. She was active in supporting Madrid's bid for the 2016 Summer Olympics and Paralympics. She has supported efforts by Doctors Without Borders to provide a treatment on avoiding the spread of AIDS from breastfeeding mothers to their offspring.

Perales was a major sponsor for December 2012 Gala Solidaria Deportivo-Benéfica, which benefitted Fundación Carlos Sanz, an organisation that helps feed the hungry in Aragon. In 2012, while serving as an ambassador for the Fundación Vicente Ferrer, she traveled to India where she spoke with low-caste Indian women with disabilities. In December 2012, she attended an event in support of Intermón Oxfam.

As of 2013, she lives in Zaragoza.

== Swimming ==
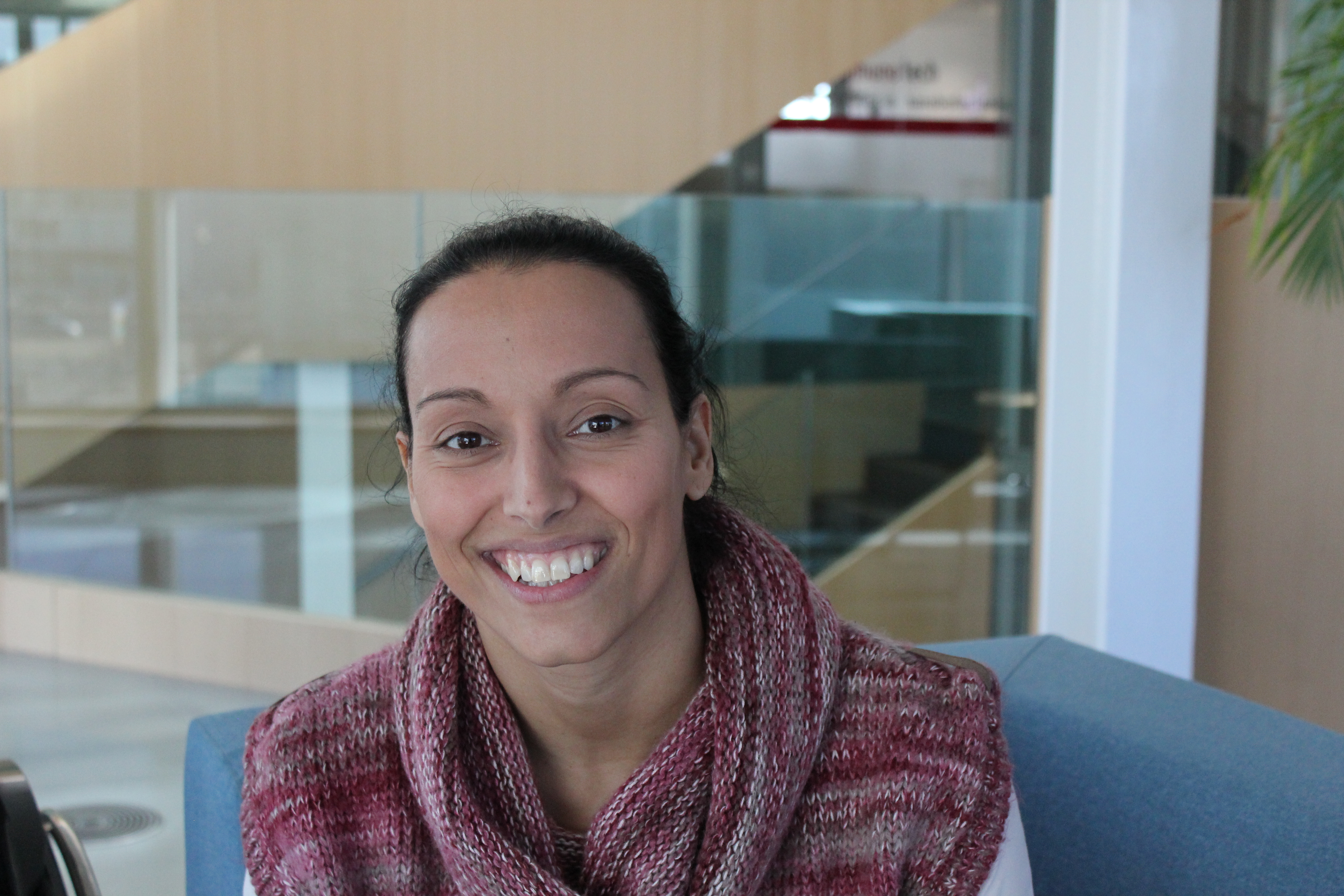
Teresa Perales in Zaragoza in January 2013

Perales is a S5, SB4, SM5 classified Paralympic swimmer and is a member of CD Asser: Spain. She is the most decorated Spanish Paralympian in history. As of 2013, her swimming coach is Angelo Santamaria, who has been with her since 2000 and during her time serving in political office. When training, Perales can spend up to four or five hours at a time in the pool and an hour in the gym for a training day lasting up to six hours. She specialises in the 50 m butterfly, her favourite stroke.

Perales took up swimming at the age of 19 at a pool in Salou by accident and stuck with the sport because she liked the feeling of being weightless in the water. When she tried swimming for the first time following contracting neuropathy, she did so wearing a lifejacket. Within a year of that first swim, she joined CAI CDM, a sports club in Zaragoza for people with disabilities.

In 1997, Perales won her first national swimming championship. She made her international debut a year later at the World Championships. At the 1999 European Championship in Braunschweig, Germany, she earned three bronze medals and three silver medals. Two years later, at the 2001 European Championships in Stockholm, Sweden, she improved on that medal haul with one gold medal, four silver medals, a bronze medal and two fourth-place finishes.

In 2007, she participated in the British Championship Short Course Swimming Championship, where she set a pair of world records in the 100 and 200 meter freestyle events and would have set qualifying times for the 2008 Beijing Paralympics if they had been in a 50-metre pool. The world records she broke were her own and dated back to 2002. That year, she also participated in the United States National Short Course Swimming Championship, where she earned five gold medals in the 50 m backstroke, freestyle and butterfly events, 100 m freestyle and 200 m freestyle event. By 2008, she had earned 14 career medals at the European Championships. In 2008, she participated in the French Swimming Championships and International Swimming Open where she earned three gold medals in the 100 m freestyle, 50 m freestyle and 50 m backstroke events.

A year after the 2008 Summer Paralympics, following the 2009 European Championships, Perales took a break from swimming in order to give birth and spend time with her young son. She returned to the pool in April 2011. Her first competition following her return was the European Championship in Berlin where she earned a gold medal in the 100 m freestyle; four silver medals in 50 and 200 m freestyle, 50 butterfly and 4x100 freestyle relay; and three bronzes in the 200 m medley and 4x100 medley relay 4x50 freestyle events. Her performance helped Spain finish third overall in the medal count.

=== World Championships ===
Perales made her international debut for Spain at the IPC World Championships in Christchurch, New Zealand, in 1998, where she earned a bronze in the 50 m freestyle event; three fourth-place finishes in the 4 x 50 m freestyle 20 points relay, 4 x 50 m medley 20 points relay and the 400 m freestyle; a seventh-place finish in the 100 m libre event; and an eighth-place finish in the 50 m butterfly. Four years later, at the 2002 IPC World Championship in Mar del Plata, Argentina, she earned five silver medals and two bronze medals. At the 2006 IPC World Swimming Championship in Durban, South Africa, she earned one silver, two bronzes and had one fourth- and one fifth-place finish. Her non-medal events were both relays.

==== Results ====
Medal	Year	Event	Time
Bronze	1998	50 m Freestyle S6	38.08
Silver	2002	50 m Freestyle S5	37.36
Silver	2002	100 m Freestyle S5	01:20.9
Bronze	2002	200 m Freestyle S5	02:58.4
Bronze	2002	50 m Backstroke S5	45.63
Silver	2002	100 m Breaststroke SB4	02:06.3
Silver	2002	50 m Butterfly S5	43.47
Silver	2002	200 m Individual Medley SM5	03:39.0
Bronze	2006	50 m Freestyle S5	39.24
Bronze	2006	50 m Backstroke S5	49.11
Silver	2006	50 m Butterfly S5	49.46

=== Paralympics ===
Perales competed at four Paralympic Games: the 2000 Summer Paralympics, 2004 Summer Paralympics, 2008 Summer Paralympics and 2012 Summer Paralympics. She won her first medals at the 2000 Summer Paralympics, earning a bronze in the 100 and 200 m. freestyle, bronze in the 50 m. backstroke and 50 m. freestyle, and a silver in the 50 m. butterfly. The only events for which she failed to make the podium were the 20 point relays in the Medley Relay 4 x 50 and 4 x 50 Freestyle Relay events, in which her teams finished seventh and fifth respectively.

At the 2004 Athens Games, aged 27, Perales won two gold medals, the first gold medals in her Paralympic career. She also earned three bronze medals and a silver at the 2004 Games. She made the finals in every event she was scheduled to compete in, failing to medal only in the 4 x 50 freestyle relay 20 point event, in which her relay team finished fourth. While in Athens, she visited the Greek Parliament as a representative of Cortes de Aragón and was presented with a copy of the epitaph of Pericles. Going into the 2004 Games, she was dealing with problems with her stroke rate. She was one of three Argonese competitors representing Spain at the Games, and finished the Games as Spain's most decorated athlete. While in Athens, the vice president primera of Parlamento autónomo, Ana Fernández, and Argonese party leader Javier Allué visited Perales to congratulate her on her success. She finished the Games with eleven all-time Paralympic medals. Following the Games, there was some speculation by her swimming rivals that she would retire, but Perales assured them that was not her plan.

Perales then won three more gold medals at the 2008 Summer Paralympics, where she also won a bronze and a silver. Perales failed to medal in only one event she competed in, the 50 m butterfly, in which she failed to make it out of qualifying round. At these games, she set her first world record on the Paralympic stage. Her first medal, a gold in the 100 meters freestyle, was the first earned by a Spanish athlete at the Beijing Paralympics and also broke a world record that had been set by Beatrice Hess in 2000. Her second gold was set in a world record time of 35.88 seconds in the 50 m freestyle, a little over half a second faster than the existing world record of 36.42 seconds set in 2003. She was also the first Spanish athlete to earn two medals at the Games. By the time she earned her third medal, her personal total accounted for a third of Spain's total medals. At the conclusion of the Games, she had sixteen total medals, tied with Purificación Santamarta, a blind sprinter, for the most medals earned at the Paralympics by a Spanish athlete.

During the closing ceremonies of the 2008 Games, she was voted by her Paralympic peers to serve on the Council of the International Paralympic Committee as the athlete representative for the four years preceding the London Games. In this role, she spoke before the International Olympic Committee in 2009. She was re-elected following the 2012 Games. One of the reasons she wanted to hold the position again was to support Madrid's bid for the 2020 Summer Olympics and Paralympics.

Going into the 2012 London Games, Perales was one of three Aragon based Spanish Paralympians and was selected to serve as her country's flag-bearer during the opening ceremonies. Her roommate at the 2012 Paralympics was Esther Morales Fernández.

Perales received a large amount of national media attention as a result of her performance at the 2012 Paralympics, having won a gold medal at 100 m freestyle, three silver medals at 50 m and 200 m freestyle and 50 m butterfly and two bronze medals at 200 individual medley and 100 breaststroke. She medaled in each of the 6 individual events in which she competed. She set a personal best in the 50 m butterfly event. Participating in relay events, her team finished fifth in the 4 x 100 relay est 34 point event with a time of 5:06.04 and fourth in the 4 x 100 relay free 34 point event 4:35.09. Following her gold medal win in the 100 m Freestyle S5, she gave her medal to her two-year-old son. Before her gold medal race, she got ready by listening to music. Following one of her victories, the Spanish Prime Minister, Mariano Rajoy, sent her a telegram to congratulate her on her success. By the conclusion of the London Paralympics, she had amassed 22 Paralympic medals during the course of her Paralympic career. As a result of her performance and the resulting media coverage during the London Paralympics, she became a trending topic on Twitter in Spain.

Her six medals in a single Games tied Michael Phelps' record for the most ever won by an Olympian or Paralympian at a single Games. The total made swimming helped the largest medal sport for Spaniards at the 2012 Games, Spanish swimmers picking up eleven total medals in the pool compared to seven earned by Spanish cyclists.

While in London in advance of the London Paralympics, Perales had the opportunity to see Michael Phelps swim. During and after the Games, the Spanish media drew numerous comparisons between her London performance and Phelp's performance.

Following the 2012 Games, Perales indicated she planned to keep competing and to try to qualify for the 2016 Summer Paralympics in Rio. She went on to take part in the 2016, 2020 and 2024 Summer Paralympics, earning at least one medal in each. In the 2024 Summer Paralympics she broke the previous record and became the new holder of the Paralympic record in women's 100m freestyle (S2).

==== Results ====
Medal	Year	Event	Time
Bronze	2000 Sydney	50 m Freestyle S5	38.36
Bronze	2000 Sydney	100 m Freestyle S5	1:23.4
Bronze	2000 Sydney	200 m Freestyle S5	2:56.5
Bronze	2000 Sydney	50 m Backstroke S5	49.41
Silver	2000 Sydney	50 m Butterfly S5	46.56
Bronze	2004 Athens	50 m Freestyle S5	37.62
Gold	2004 Athens	100 m Freestyle S5	1:20.0
Bronze	2004 Athens	50 m Backstroke S5	45.39
Bronze	2004 Athens	100 m Breaststroke SB4	2:00.9
Gold	2004 Athens	50 m Butterfly S5	44.7
Silver	2004 Athens	4 x 50 m Medley Relay 20 Points	3:31.5
Gold	2008 Beijing	50 m Freestyle S5	35.88
Gold	2008 Beijing	100 m Freestyle S5	1:16.6
Gold	2008 Beijing	200 m Freestyle S5	2:47.5
Silver	2008 Beijing	50 m Backstroke S5	44.58
Bronze	2008 Beijing	100 m Breaststroke SB4	2:01.3
Silver	2012 London	50 m Freestyle S5	36.5
Bronze	2012 London	200 m Individual Medley SM5	3:28.6
Silver	2012 London	200 m Freestyle S5	2:51.8
Bronze	2012 London	100 m Breaststroke SB4	1:56.2
Silver	2012 London	50 m Butterfly S5	42.67
Gold	2012 London	100 m Freestyle S5	1:18.5
Silver	2016 Rio de Janeiro	200 m Freestyle S5	2:50.91
Silver	2016 Rio de Janeiro	200 m Individual Medley SM5	3:36.14
Gold	2016 Rio de Janeiro	50 m Backstroke S5	43.03
Silver	2016 Rio de Janeiro	100 m Freestyle S5	1:20.47
Silver	2020 Tokyo	50 m Backstroke S5	43.02
Bronze	2024 Paris	50m backstroke S2	1:10.95

== Awards and recognition ==
Perales was awarded the Gran Cruz del Mérito Deportivo. She was the first Spanish Paralympian to be awarded this honour, and the 34th person in the nation's history to receive the award. She has also been awarded the Medalla de Oro de la Real Orden del Mérito Deportivo and the Medalla al Mérito Deportivo del Gobierno de Aragón.

The House of Aragon honoured her following the 2004 Summer Paralympics. In September 2008, Perales was named the IPC Athlete of the Month. In 2008, she was honoured by being named a Beloved Daughter of the city of Zaragosa. That year, she was also honoured with the Homenaje a las Heroínas medal at a ceremony that took place during the Fiestas del Pilar. In earning this recognition, the organization presenting it said that she was an "example of perseverance, hard work and tenacity. Her figure exceeds the limits sports to become a social relation that makes you feel proud to belong to that community." (Note: "ejemplo de superación, esfuerzo y tenacidad. Su figura sobrepasa los límites deportivos para convertirse en un referente social que hace sentir orgullo a la comunidad a la que pertenece") In 2011, she was one of five Spanish athletes with disabilities featured in La Teoría del Espiralismo, a documentary produced by New Atlantis and Mafalda Entertainment.

In 2012, La Asociación de la Prensa Deportiva de Zaragoza named her the best female Best Athlete Aragoneses of the year. That year, she was also voted by readers of Marca as the second best Spanish athlete for the year. She was presented with a special award as part of the 2012 AS Award ceremony in Madrid hosted by the Spanish newspaper Diario AS. In September 2012, she was featured in Unidad móvil, a television special that had two reporters who followed her around for her 48 hours in Madrid following her return from the London Paralympics.

Perales was honored at the 2012 Fiestas del Pilar and gave the festival's opening speech. That year, she was also given an award by the Spanish women's magazine Mujer hoy for Woman of the Year. The recipient of the award was chosen by the magazine's readers. Princess Letizia of Spain was the award ceremony's presenter. She was also recognised as an exemplary citizen of her hometown in 2012.

Cadena SER said that she changed the future of Paralympic sport in Spain. (Note: "La hazaña de Teresa Perales. La silla le cambió la vida y ella ha cambiado la historia del deporte paraolímpico español.") Spanish female basketball star Laura Gil said if she were to have given the 2012 FIFA Ballon d'Or to someone, she would have given it to Perales.

In 2013, she was awarded the Grand Cross in the Royal Order of Sporting Merit, Spain's highest recognition to a sportsperson.

In 2021, she was awarded the Princess of Asturias Award for sports.

Since 2022, Teresa Perales has been a Global Advisor for the ACE Global Leaders of Excellence Network, a diverse platform of ACE Health Foundation. ACE Health Foundation is a non-profit organization in United States that connects leaders who are globally committed to international leadership development; grounded in the premise that focused sharing of knowledge, expertise, and resources increases the probability of productive and powerful outcomes.

== Notable published works ==
- Teresa Perales (2007). Mi vida sobre ruedas: La lucha de una mujer, campeona paralímpica, de natación y política, para afrontar con optimismo su discapacidad. Esfera de los libros. ISBN 9788497346535.
- Teresa Perales (2014). La fuerza de un sueño. Conecta. ISBN 9788415431886.
