= Maria Götze =

German Paralympic swimmer

Personal information
- Born: 24 December 1980 (age 45) Frankenberg, East Germany

Sport
- Country: Germany
- Sport: Paralympic swimming
- Disability: Achondroplasia
- Disability class: S6, SM6
- Retired: 2010
Medal record
Paralympic swimming
Representing Germany
Paralympic Games
Gold medal – first place	1996 Atlanta	Women's 50m butterfly S6
Silver medal – second place	1996 Atlanta	Women's 200m individual emdley SM6
Silver medal – second place	2000 Sydney	Women's 4x50m medley relay 20pts
Silver medal – second place	2008 Beijing	Women's 200m individual medley SM6
Bronze medal – third place	2000 Sydney	Women's 400m freestyle S6
Bronze medal – third place	2000 Sydney	Women's 200m individual medley SM6
Bronze medal – third place	2004 Athens	Women's 200m individual medley SM6
Bronze medal – third place	2008 Beijing	Women's 400m freestyle S6
World Championships
Gold medal – first place	2002 Mar del Plata	Women's 200m individual medley SM6
Gold medal – first place	2002 Mar del Plata	Women's 400m freestyle S6
Silver medal – second place	1998 Christchurch	Women's 50m butterfly S6
Silver medal – second place	1998 Christchurch	Women's 200m individual medley SM6
Silver medal – second place	2002 Mar del Plata	Women's 50m butterfly S6
Silver medal – second place	2002 Mar del Plata	Women's 100m freestyle S6
Bronze medal – third place	1998 Christchurch	Women's 100m backstroke S6
Bronze medal – third place	1998 Christchurch	Women's 4x100m medley open
Bronze medal – third place	2002 Mar del Plata	Women's 50m freestyle S6
Bronze medal – third place	2002 Mar del Plata	Women's 100m backstroke S6
Bronze medal – third place	2002 Mar del Plata	Women's 100m breaststroke SB6
Bronze medal – third place	2006 Durban	Women's 400m freestyle S6

Maria Götze (born 24 December 1980) is a retired German Paralympic swimmer.
