= Swimming at the 2008 Summer Paralympics – Women's 100 metre freestyle S4 =

Women's 100m Freestyle S4 at the XIII Paralympic Games
- Venue: Beijing National Aquatics Center
- Dates: 7 September
- Competitors: 9 from 7 nations
- Winning time: 1:44.11

Medalists
1st place, gold medalist(s)		Nely Miranda	Mexico
2nd place, silver medalist(s)		Cheryl Angelelli	United States
3rd place, bronze medalist(s)		Aimee Bruder	United States

The women's 100m freestyle S4 event at the 2008 Summer Paralympics took place at the Beijing National Aquatics Center on 7 September. There were two heats; the swimmers with the eight fastest times advanced to the final.

== Results ==
=== Heats ===
Competed from 09:39.

==== Heat 1 ====
Rank	Name	Nationality	Time	Notes
1	Aimee Bruder	United States	1:56.69	Q
2	Jennie Ekstrom	Sweden	2:00.22	Q
3	Patricia Valle	Mexico	2:03.82	Q, WR
4	Karolina Hamer	Poland	2:05.65	Q

==== Heat 2 ====
Rank	Name	Nationality	Time	Notes
1	Nely Miranda	Mexico	1:45.89	Q
2	Cheryl Angelelli	United States	1:50.51	Q
3	Edenia Garcia	Brazil	1:59.11	Q
4	Annke Conradi	Germany	2:20.93	Q
5	Cecilie Kristiansen	Denmark	2:22.42	

=== Final ===
Competed at 17:48.

Rank	Name	Nationality	Time	Notes
1st place, gold medalist(s)	Nely Miranda	Mexico	1:44.11	
2nd place, silver medalist(s)	Cheryl Angelelli	United States	1:50.25	
3rd place, bronze medalist(s)	Aimee Bruder	United States	1:55.33	
4	Edenia Garcia	Brazil	1:58.02	
5	Karolina Hamer	Poland	1:59.28	
6	Jennie Ekstrom	Sweden	2:00.68	
7	Patricia Valle	Mexico	2:02.50	WR
8	Annke Conradi	Germany	2:19.95	

Q = qualified for final. WR = World Record.
