= Swimming at the 2004 Summer Paralympics – Women's 200 metre freestyle S4 =

Women's 200m Freestyle S4 at the XII Paralympic Games
- Paralympic Swimming
- Venue: Olympic Aquatic Centre
- Dates: 21 September 2004
- Competitors: 9 from 7 nations
- Winning time: 3:02.00

Medalists
1st place, gold medalist(s)		Mayumi Narita	Japan
2nd place, silver medalist(s)		Karen Breumsoe	Denmark
3rd place, bronze medalist(s)		Cheryl Angelelli	United States

The Women's 200 metre freestyle S4 swimming event at the 2004 Summer Paralympics was competed on 21 September. It was won by Mayumi Narita, representing Japan.

== 1st round ==
Qualified for final round

Heat 1

21 Sept. 2004, morning session

Rank	Athlete	Time	Notes
1	Karen Breumsoe (DEN)	3:56.20	
2	Cheryl Angelelli (USA)	3:57.44	
3	Anne Cecile Lequien (FRA)	4:10.82	
4	Annke Conradi (GER)	4:36.27	

Heat 2

21 Sept. 2004, morning session

Rank	Athlete	Time	Notes
1	Mayumi Narita (JPN)	3:20.50	
2	Aimee Bruder (USA)	3:58.00	
3	Edenia Garcia (BRA)	4:15.78	
4	Patricia Valle (MEX)	4:25.15	
5	Claudia Silva (BRA)	5:08.71	

== Final round ==
21 Sept. 2004, evening session

Rank	Athlete	Time	Notes
1st place, gold medalist(s)	Mayumi Narita (JPN)	3:02.00	WR
2nd place, silver medalist(s)	Karen Breumsoe (DEN)	3:50.92	
3rd place, bronze medalist(s)	Cheryl Angelelli (USA)	3:51.41	
4	Aimee Bruder (USA)	3:55.87	
5	Anne Cecile Lequien (FRA)	3:58.54	
6	Edenia Garcia (BRA)	4:10.91	
7	Patricia Valle (MEX)	4:25.69	
8	Annke Conradi (GER)	4:38.03	
