= Swimming at the 2016 Summer Paralympics – Women's 50 metre breaststroke SB3 =

Women's 50 metre breaststroke SB3 at the XV Paralympic Games
- Venue: Olympic Aquatics Stadium
- Dates: 14 September 2016
- Competitors: 15 from 9 nations

Medalists
1st place, gold medalist(s)		Jiao Cheng	China
2nd place, silver medalist(s)		Mariia Lafina	Ukraine
3rd place, bronze medalist(s)		Patricia Valle	Mexico

The women's 50 metre breaststroke SB3 event at the 2016 Paralympic Games took place on 14 September 2016, at the Olympic Aquatics Stadium. Two heats were held. The swimmers with the eight fastest times advanced to the final.

== Heats ==
=== Heat 1 ===
10:36 14 September 2016:

Rank	Lane	Name	Nationality	Time	Notes
1	4	Patricia Valle	Mexico	1:01.34	Q
2	5	Mariia Lafina	Ukraine	1:02.23	Q
3	1	Yue Deng	China	1:07.32	Q
4	3	Rildene Firmino	Brazil	1:07.66	Q
5	2	Rachael Watson	Australia	1:08.19	
6	6	Qiuping Peng	China	1:13.95	PR
7	7	Tammy Cunnington	Canada	1:19.78	

=== Heat 2 ===
10:41 14 September 2016:

Rank	Lane	Name	Nationality	Time	Notes
1	2	Jiao Cheng	China	59.87	Q
2	5	Olga Sviderska	Ukraine	1:01.31	Q
3	3	Arjola Trimi	Italy	1:06.55	Q
4	7	Patricia Pereira dos Santos	Brazil	1:07.38	Q
5	6	Maryna Verbova	Ukraine	1:08.21	
6	1	Zulfiya Gabidullina	Kazakhstan	1:19.01	
7	8	Zsanett Adami	Hungary	1:32.44	
	4	Nely Miranda Herrera	Mexico		DSQ

== Final ==
19:24 14 September 2016:

Rank	Lane	Name	Nationality	Time	Notes
1st place, gold medalist(s)	4	Jiao Cheng	China	58.28	
2nd place, silver medalist(s)	6	Mariia Lafina	Ukraine	1:01.92	
3rd place, bronze medalist(s)	3	Patricia Valle	Mexico	1:02.40	
4	5	Olga Sviderska	Ukraine	1:03.20	
5	1	Patricia Pereira dos Santos	Brazil	1:07.42	
6	2	Arjola Trimi	Italy	1:07.69	
7	7	Yue Deng	China	1:08.49	
8	8	Rildene Firmino	Brazil	1:08.59	
