= Swimming at the 2004 Summer Paralympics – Women's 100 metre freestyle S4 =

Women's 100m Freestyle S4 at the XII Paralympic Games
- Paralympic Swimming
- Venue: Olympic Aquatic Centre
- Dates: 19 September 2004
- Competitors: 9 from 6 nations
- Winning time: 1:25.07

Medalists
1st place, gold medalist(s)		Mayumi Narita	Japan
2nd place, silver medalist(s)		Karen Breumsoe	Denmark
3rd place, bronze medalist(s)		Melanie Benn	United States

The Women's 100 metre freestyle S4 swimming event at the 2004 Summer Paralympics was competed on 19 September. It was won by Mayumi Narita, representing Japan.

== 1st round ==
Qualified for final round

Heat 1

19 Sept. 2004, morning session

Rank	Athlete	Time	Notes
1	Cheryl Angelelli (USA)	1:52.56	
2	Edenia Garcia (BRA)	1:53.81	
3	Aimee Bruder (USA)	1:53.92	
4	Sandra Erikson (SWE)	2:12.11	

Heat 2

19 Sept. 2004, morning session

Rank	Athlete	Time	Notes
1	Mayumi Narita (JPN)	1:32.70	
2	Karen Breumsoe (DEN)	1:50.96	
3	Melanie Benn (USA)	1:51.56	
4	Anne Cécile Lequien (FRA)	1:55.37	
5	Claudia Silva (BRA)	2:26.04	

== Final round ==
19 Sept. 2004, evening session

Rank	Athlete	Time	Notes
1st place, gold medalist(s)	Mayumi Narita (JPN)	1:25.07	WR
2nd place, silver medalist(s)	Karen Breumsoe (DEN)	1:51.00	
3rd place, bronze medalist(s)	Melanie Benn (USA)	1:51.59	
4	Cheryl Angelelli (USA)	1:52.07	
5	Anne Cécile Lequien (FRA)	1:53.27	
6	Aimee Bruder (USA)	1:53.99	
7	Edenia Garcia (BRA)	1:55.23	
8	Sandra Erikson (SWE)	2:09.49	
