= Swimming at the 2004 Summer Paralympics – Women's 50 metre freestyle S4 =

Women's 50m Freestyle S4 at the XII Paralympic Games
- Paralympic Swimming
- Venue: Olympic Aquatic Centre
- Dates: 27 September 2004
- Competitors: 10 from 7 nations
- Winning time: 39.22

Medalists
1st place, gold medalist(s)		Mayumi Narita	Japan
2nd place, silver medalist(s)		Melanie Benn	United States
3rd place, bronze medalist(s)		Karen Breumsoe	Denmark

The Women's 50 metre freestyle S4 swimming event at the 2004 Summer Paralympics was competed on 27 September. It was won by Mayumi Narita, representing Japan.

== 1st round ==
Qualified for final round

Heat 1

27 Sept. 2004, morning session

Rank	Athlete	Time	Notes
1	Edenia Garcia (BRA)	53.37	
1	Cheryl Angelelli (USA)	53.37	
3	Aimee Bruder (USA)	56.60	
4	Natalia Popova (RUS)	1:00.70	
5	Claudia Silva (BRA)	1:07.68	

Heat 2

27 Sept. 2004, morning session

Rank	Athlete	Time	Notes
1	Mayumi Narita (JPN)	44.90	
2	Karen Breumsoe (DEN)	53.80	
3	Anne Cecile Lequien (FRA)	55.35	
4	Melanie Benn (USA)	56.42	
5	Sandra Erikson (SWE)	57.09	

== Final round ==
27 Sept. 2004, evening session

Rank	Athlete	Time	Notes
1st place, gold medalist(s)	Mayumi Narita (JPN)	39.22	WR
2nd place, silver medalist(s)	Melanie Benn (USA)	52.50	
3rd place, bronze medalist(s)	Karen Breumsoe (DEN)	53.18	
4	Cheryl Angelelli (USA)	53.23	
5	Edenia Garcia (BRA)	53.88	
6	Anne Cecile Lequien (FRA)	54.32	
7	Sandra Erikson (SWE)	56.54	
8	Aimee Bruder (USA)	56.60	
