= Swimming at the 2016 Summer Paralympics – Women's 150 metre individual medley SM4 =

Women's 150 metre individual medley SM4 at the XV Paralympic Games
- Venue: Olympic Aquatics Stadium
- Dates: 12 September 2016
- Competitors: 12 from 9 nations

Medalists
1st place, gold medalist(s)		Jiao Cheng	China
2nd place, silver medalist(s)		Olga Sviderska	Ukraine
3rd place, bronze medalist(s)		Yue Deng	China

The women's 150 metre individual medley SM4 event at the 2016 Paralympic Games took place on 12 September 2016, at the Olympic Aquatics Stadium. Two heats were held. The swimmers with the eight fastest times advanced to the final.

== Heats ==
=== Heat 1 ===
10:11 12 September 2016:

Rank	Lane	Name	Nationality	Time	Notes
1	5	Jiao Cheng	China	2:47.57	WR Q
2	4	Olga Sviderska	Ukraine	2:58.72	WR Q
3	3	Karolina Hamer	Poland	3:21.26	Q
4	2	Zulfiya Gabidullina	Kazakhstan	3:24.81	Q
5	6	Patricia Valle	Mexico	3:27.82	
6	7	Rachael Watson	Australia	3:38.66	

=== Heat 2 ===
10:18 12 September 2016:

Rank	Lane	Name	Nationality	Time	Notes
1	4	Mariia Lafina	Ukraine	2:54.27	Q
2	6	Yue Deng	China	2:58.54	Q
3	5	Arjola Trimi	Italy	3:02.37	Q
4	3	Nely Miranda Herrera	Mexico	3:09.89	Q
5	7	Rildene Firmino	Brazil	3:34.63	
6	2	Tammy Cunnington	Canada	3:38.53	

== Final ==
17:58 12 September 2016:

Rank	Lane	Name	Nationality	Time	Notes
1st place, gold medalist(s)	4	Jiao Cheng	China	2:49.69	
2nd place, silver medalist(s)	6	Olga Sviderska	Ukraine	2:54.14	WR
3rd place, bronze medalist(s)	3	Yue Deng	China	2:57.26	
4	7	Nely Miranda Herrera	Mexico	2:57.76	
5	2	Arjola Trimi	Italy	2:57.91	
6	5	Mariia Lafina	Ukraine	3:01.30	
7	8	Zulfiya Gabidullina	Kazakhstan	3:25.30	
	1	Karolina Hamer	Poland		DSQ
