= Swimming at the 2016 Summer Paralympics – Women's 50 metre backstroke S4 =

Women's 50 metre backstroke S4 at the XV Paralympic Games
- Venue: Olympic Aquatics Stadium
- Dates: 16 September 2016
- Competitors: 9 from 7 nations

Medalists
1st place, gold medalist(s)		Jiao Cheng	China
2nd place, silver medalist(s)		Yue Deng	China
3rd place, bronze medalist(s)		Maryna Verbova	Ukraine

The women's 50 metre backstroke S4 event at the 2016 Paralympic Games took place on 16 September 2016, at the Olympic Aquatics Stadium. Two heats were held. The swimmers with the eight fastest times advanced to the final.

== Heats ==
=== Heat 1 ===
10:23 16 September 2016:

Rank	Lane	Name	Nationality	Time	Notes
1	4	Jiao Cheng	China	47.68	WR Q
2	5	Edenia Garcia	Brazil	54.59	Q
3	3	Nely Miranda Herrera	Mexico	56.05	Q
4	6	Sonja Sigurðardóttir	Iceland	1:01.65	Q

=== Heat 2 ===
10:27 16 September 2016:

Rank	Lane	Name	Nationality	Time	Notes
1	6	Mariia Lafina	Ukraine	51.62	Q
2	3	Yue Deng	China	51.94	Q
3	5	Maryna Verbova	Ukraine	53.38	Q
4	4	Arjola Trimi	Italy	57.09	Q
5	2	Karolina Hamer	Poland	1:03.11	

== Final ==
18:30 16 September 2016:

Rank	Lane	Name	Nationality	Time	Notes
1st place, gold medalist(s)	4	Jiao Cheng	China	48.11	
2nd place, silver medalist(s)	3	Yue Deng	China	50.01	
3rd place, bronze medalist(s)	6	Maryna Verbova	Ukraine	52.28	
4	7	Nely Miranda Herrera	Mexico	53.42	
5	1	Arjola Trimi	Italy	54.03	
6	5	Mariia Lafina	Ukraine	54.08	
7	2	Edenia Garcia	Brazil	55.50	
8	8	Sonja Sigurdardottir	Iceland	59.97	
