= Swimming at the 2008 Summer Paralympics – Women's 50 metre freestyle S4 =

Women's 50m Freestyle S4 at the XIII Paralympic Games
- Venue: Beijing National Aquatics Center
- Dates: 15 September
- Competitors: 7 from 6 nations
- Winning time: 46.27

Medalists
1st place, gold medalist(s)		Nely Miranda	Mexico
2nd place, silver medalist(s)		Cheryl Angelelli	United States
3rd place, bronze medalist(s)		Edenia Garcia	Brazil

The women's 50m freestyle S4 event at the 2008 Summer Paralympics took place at the Beijing National Aquatics Center on 15 September. There were no heats in this event.

== Final ==
Competed at 18:38.

Rank	Name	Nationality	Time	Notes
1st place, gold medalist(s)	Nely Miranda	Mexico	46.27	WR
2nd place, silver medalist(s)	Cheryl Angelelli	United States	52.81	
3rd place, bronze medalist(s)	Edenia Garcia	Brazil	53.28	
4	Jennie Ekstrom	Sweden	53.74	
5	Aimee Bruder	United States	55.04	
6	Karolina Hamer	Poland	58.46	
7	Cecilie Kristiansen	Denmark	1:04.48	

WR = World Record.
