= Swimming at the 2004 Summer Paralympics – Women's 50 metre backstroke S4 =

Women's 50m Backstroke S4 at the XII Paralympic Games
- Paralympic Swimming
- Venue: Olympic Aquatic Centre
- Dates: 20 September 2004
- Competitors: 9 from 8 nations
- Winning time: 49.54

Medalists
| 1st place, gold medalist(s) | | Mayumi Narita | Japan |
| 2nd place, silver medalist(s) | | Edenia Garcia | Brazil |
| 3rd place, bronze medalist(s) | | Anne Cecile Lequien | France |

The Women's 50 metre backstroke S4 swimming event at the 2004 Summer Paralympics was competed on 20 September. It was won by Mayumi Narita, representing Japan.

== 1st round ==
| Qualified for final round |

Heat 1

20 Sept. 2004, morning session

| Rank | Athlete | Time | Notes |
|---|---|---|---|
| 1 | Mayumi Narita (JPN) | 51.08 | |
| 2 | Natalia Popova (RUS) | 59.35 | |
| 3 | Sofiya Avramova (UKR) | 1:00.51 | |
| 4 | Aimee Bruder (USA) | 1:10.06 | |

Heat 2

20 Sept. 2004, morning session

| Rank | Athlete | Time | Notes |
|---|---|---|---|
| 1 | Edenia Garcia (BRA) | 52.61 | |
| 2 | Anne Cecile Lequien (FRA) | 54.05 | |
| 3 | Melanie Benn (USA) | 1:05.64 | |
| 4 | Karolina Hamer (POL) | 1:06.68 | |
| 5 | Regina Cachan (ESP) | 1:12.50 | |

== Final round ==
20 Sept. 2004, evening session

| Rank | Athlete | Time | Notes |
|---|---|---|---|
| 1st place, gold medalist(s) | Mayumi Narita (JPN) | 49.54 | PR |
| 2nd place, silver medalist(s) | Edenia Garcia (BRA) | 51.51 | |
| 3rd place, bronze medalist(s) | Anne Cecile Lequien (FRA) | 53.37 | |
| 4 | Natalia Popova (RUS) | 57.18 | |
| 5 | Sofiya Avramova (UKR) | 1:01.27 | |
| 6 | Melanie Benn (USA) | 1:04.59 | |
| 7 | Karolina Hamer (POL) | 1:06.09 | |
| 8 | Aimee Bruder (USA) | 1:07.76 | |
