= Swimming at the 2012 Summer Paralympics – Women's 50 metre backstroke S4 =

Women's 50m Backstroke S4 at the XIV Paralympic Games
- Venue: London Aquatics Centre
- Dates: 6 September
- Competitors: 13 from 12 nations
- Winning time: 51.51

Medalists
| 1st place, gold medalist(s) | | Lisette Teunissen | Netherlands |
| 2nd place, silver medalist(s) | | Edênia Garcia | Brazil |
| 3rd place, bronze medalist(s) | | Bai Juan | China |

The women's 50m backstroke S4 event at the 2012 Summer Paralympics took place at the London Aquatics Centre on 6 September. There were two heats, and the swimmers with the eight fastest times advanced to the final. Lisette Teunissen, representing the Netherlands, won gold.

== Results ==
=== Heats ===
Competed from 10:53.

==== Heat 1 ====
| Rank | Lane | Name | Nationality | Time | Notes |
|---|---|---|---|---|---|
| 1 | 5 | Bai Juan | China | 54.00 | Q, AS |
| 2 | 4 | Edênia Garcia | Brazil | 54.70 | Q |
| 3 | 6 | Irina Kolmogorova | Russia | 56.51 | Q |
| 4 | 3 | Aimee Bruder | United States | 1:03.44 | Q |
| 5 | 2 | Semicha Rizaoglou | Greece | 1:08.13 | |
| 6 | 7 | Zulfiya Gabidullina | Kazakhstan | 1:10.12 | |

==== Heat 2 ====
| Rank | Lane | Name | Nationality | Time | Notes |
|---|---|---|---|---|---|
| 1 | 4 | Lisette Teunissen | Netherlands | 52.90 | Q |
| 2 | 5 | Olga Sviderska | Ukraine | 59.82 | Q |
| 3 | 3 | Jennie Ekström | Sweden | 1:01.53 | Q |
| 4 | 6 | Karolina Hamer | Poland | 1:05.62 | Q |
| 5 | 7 | Jeon Mikyoung | South Korea | 1:06.97 | |
| 6 | 2 | Annke Conradi | Germany | 1:07.24 | |
| 7 | 1 | Vera Thamm | Germany | 1:16.89 | |

=== Final ===
Competed at 19:00.

| Rank | Lane | Name | Nationality | Time | Notes |
|---|---|---|---|---|---|
| 1st place, gold medalist(s) | 4 | Lisette Teunissen | Netherlands | 51.51 | |
| 2nd place, silver medalist(s) | 3 | Edênia Garcia | Brazil | 53.85 | |
| 3rd place, bronze medalist(s) | 5 | Bai Juan | China | 54.33 | |
| 4 | 6 | Irina Kolmogorova | Russia | 55.37 | |
| 5 | 2 | Olga Sviderska | Ukraine | 58.20 | EU |
| 6 | 7 | Jennie Ekström | Sweden | 1:00.37 | |
| 7 | 1 | Aimee Bruder | United States | 1:04.50 | |
| 8 | 8 | Karolina Hamer | Poland | 1:06.08 | |

'Q = qualified for final. EU = European Record. AS = Asian Record.
