= Swimming at the 2008 Summer Paralympics – Women's 50 metre backstroke S3 =

Women's 50m Backstroke S3 at the XIII Paralympic Games
- Venue: Beijing National Aquatics Center
- Dates: 15 September
- Competitors: 10 from 9 nations
- Winning time: 58.75

Medalists
| 1st place, gold medalist(s) | | Yip Pin Xiu | Singapore |
| 2nd place, silver medalist(s) | | Fran Williamson | Great Britain |
| 3rd place, bronze medalist(s) | | Xia Jiangbo | China |

The women's 50m backstroke S3 event at the 2008 Summer Paralympics took place at the Beijing National Aquatics Center on 15 September. There were two heats; the swimmers with the eight fastest times advanced to the final.

== Results ==
=== Heats ===
Competed from 09:47.

==== Heat 1 ====
| Rank | Name | Nationality | Time | Notes |
|---|---|---|---|---|
| 1 | Annke Conradi | Germany | 1:07.61 | Q |
| 2 | Xia Jiangbo | China | 1:13.73 | Q |
| 3 | Patricia Valle | Mexico | 1:17.89 | Q |
| 4 | Beth Kolbe | United States | 1:18.81 | Q |
| 5 | Perpetua Vaza | Portugal | 1:21.95 | |

==== Heat 2 ====
| Rank | Name | Nationality | Time | Notes |
|---|---|---|---|---|
| 1 | Yip Pin Xiu | Singapore | 57.92 | Q, WR |
| 2 | Fran Williamson | Great Britain | 1:06.75 | Q |
| 3 | Esther Overton | Australia | 1:12.49 | Q |
| 4 | Sarah Shannon | South Africa | 1:14.24 | Q |
| 5 | Fabiola Ramirez | Mexico | 1:21.71 | |

=== Final ===
Competed at 18:12.

| Rank | Name | Nationality | Time | Notes |
|---|---|---|---|---|
| 1st place, gold medalist(s) | Yip Pin Xiu | Singapore | 58.75 | |
| 2nd place, silver medalist(s) | Fran Williamson | Great Britain | 1:06.07 | |
| 3rd place, bronze medalist(s) | Xia Jiangbo | China | 1:07.97 | |
| 4 | Patricia Valle | Mexico | 1:12.88 | |
| 5 | Esther Overton | Australia | 1:13.33 | |
| 6 | Sarah Shannon | South Africa | 1:13.83 | |
| 7 | Annke Conradi | Germany | 1:14.93 | |
| 8 | Beth Kolbe | United States | 1:17.97 | |

Q = qualified for final. WR = World Record.
