= Fran Williamson =

British Paralympic swimmer

Personal information
- Full name: Frances Williamson
- Nationality: British
- Born: 16 June 1985 (age 41) Sunderland, England
- Height: 1.70 m (5 ft 7 in)
- Spouse: Chris Whitaker

Sport
- Sport: Swimming
- Strokes: freestyle, backstroke
- Club: Colchester Phoenix
Medal record
Representing Great Britain
Women's swimming
Paralympic Games
Silver medal – second place	2004 Athens	4x50m freestyle relay 20pts
Silver medal – second place	2004 Athens	50m freestyle S3
Silver medal – second place	2004 Athens	50m backstroke S3
Silver medal – second place	2008 Beijing	50m backstroke S3
Bronze medal – third place	2004 Athens	100m freestyle S3
Bronze medal – third place	2008 Beijing	50m freestyle S3
IPC World Championships
Gold medal – first place	2002 Mar del Plata	4x50m freestyle relay 20pts
Gold medal – first place	2006 Durban	4x50m freestyle relay 20pts
Gold medal – first place	2006 Durban	4x50m medley relay 20pts
Gold medal – first place	2006 Durban	50m backstroke S3
Gold medal – first place	2010 Eindhoven	50m backstroke S3
Silver medal – second place	2002 Mar del Plata	50m freestyle S3
Silver medal – second place	2002 Mar del Plata	50m backstroke S3
Silver medal – second place	2006 Durban	50m freestyle S3
Silver medal – second place	2006 Durban	200m freestyle S3
Silver medal – second place	2010 Eindhoven	50m freestyle S3
Bronze medal – third place	2002 Mar del Plata	100m freestyle S3
Bronze medal – third place	2002 Mar del Plata	200m freestyle S3
Bronze medal – third place	2010 Eindhoven	4x50m medley relay 20pts

Frances Williamson (born 16 June 1985) is a retired British Paralympic swimmer. Williamson competed in the S3 classification mainly in the freestyle and backstroke preferring shorter distances. She participated in two Summer Paralympic Games winning six medals. At the 2006 IPC World Championships she won three gold medals including the 50m backstroke S3, which she successfully defended four years later at Eindhoven.

== Personal history ==
Williamson was born in 1985 in Sunderland, Tyne and Wear, England. She was born with athetoid cerebral palsy, which affects her movement, motor skills and speech. In 1988 her family moved to Malawi, returning after five years, Williamson eventually settling in Cambridge. She matriculated to Anglia Ruskin University where she was awarded a First Class degree in Social Policy. She later returned to education to complete a master's degree in Disability Studies at Leeds University.

Williamson has also received an Honorary Doctorate from Anglia Ruskin University and an Honorary Fellowship from The University of Sunderland.

In July 2014, Williamson married Dr Chris Whitaker at the Selwyn College Chapel, Cambridge University. Fran now goes by both Fran Williamson and Fran Whitaker.

== Career history ==
Williamson was introduced to swimming as a child and began competing while at secondary school, having been terrified of water during her primary years. She was classified as a S3 classification swimmer and her first competitive meet as part of the Great Britain team was in 2001 at the European Championships in Stockholm. In 2002 Williamson travelled to Mar del Plata in Argentina to represent Great Britain at her first IPC Swimming World Championships. She took part in five events, winning a medal in each including a gold as part of the 4x50m Freestyle Relay (20 Points). In her individual events she won two silvers and two bronze.

Williamson qualified for the 2004 Summer Paralympics in Athens and entered into the 50m Freestyle S3, 100m Freestyle S3, 50m Backstroke S3 and the 4x50m freestyle relay (20 Points). In the 4x50m freestyle relay, Williamson was joined by teammates Jeanette Chippington, Mhairi Love and Jane Stidever. They finished well behind the winning Japanese team but edged out the American team by a twentieth of a second to claim silver. Williamson also won silver in the 50m freestyle and 50m backstroke, and a third place bronze medal in the 100m freestyle.

In 2005 an operation to repair damage to a tendon in her ankle resulted in a nine-month absence from swimming, but she returned to the sport in 2006. At the 2006 IPC Swimming World Championships in Durban, Williamson won her first individual gold medal at a major international meet when she won the 50m backstroke S3, beating the Olympic champion Annke Conradi who finished in third place. She took two further golds in the 20-point freestyle and medley relays, and added silver in the 50m and 200m freestyle S3.

Williamson only had two events available to her in the 2008 Summer Paralympics in Beijing. Battling from a serious shoulder injury, which later required reconstruction, Williamson's ability to compete was questioned on numerous occasions. Nevertheless, despite excruciating pain, she fought through both of her Paralympic events.

The first being the 50m freestyle S3. In the heats Williamson came third behind Yip Pin Xiu of Singapore and Patricia Valle of Mexico, but all three women set faster times than the winner of the other heat. In the final Valle took gold, Yip silver and Williamson bronze.

Two days later on 15 September, Williamson entered her final Paralympic event, the 50m backstroke S3. Although qualifying easily in second place, she finished almost nine seconds behind Yip of Singapore who set a new world record. In the final Williamson recorded a time of 1:06.75 which was enough to secure second place and her fourth career Paralympic silver medal.

After reconstructive surgery in 2008/2009, Williamson entered her final IPC World Championship, held in Eindhoven in 2010. There she successfully defended her 50m backstroke title, taking gold. She followed this with a silver in the 50m freestyle S3 and a bronze in the 4x50 medley freestyle. She followed this with two bronze medals at the European Championships in Berlin, but this was to be her final major international competition but just two months later Williamson announced her retirement from competitive swimming. She cited the quality of the next generation of athletes coming through the system would make a podium finish at the 2012 Paralympics in London difficult.

Fran was awarded an Honorary Doctorate from Anglia Ruskin University and an Honorary Fellowship from the University of Sunderland. These added to her First Class Degree in Social Policy from Anglia Ruskin University. As well as a master's degree in Disability Studies from the University of Leeds.

Fran is now the founder and owner of The Happy Journals Group - a collection of websites centred around personal development, and using & creating journals. The most popular of these being The Happy Journals and She Creates Colour.

In October 2024, Fran and her husband, Chris Whitaker, founded Purple Advantage - a company to help organisations make greater use of disability talent in the workplace and unlock the competitive advantages this brings.
