= Swimming at the 2008 Summer Paralympics – Women's 50 metre freestyle S3 =

Women's 50m Freestyle S3 at the XIII Paralympic Games
- Venue: Beijing National Aquatics Center
- Dates: 13 September
- Competitors: 14 from 11 nations
- Winning time: 57.05

Medalists
1st place, gold medalist(s)		Patricia Valle	Mexico
2nd place, silver medalist(s)		Yip Pin Xiu	Singapore
3rd place, bronze medalist(s)		Fran Williamson	Great Britain

The women's 50m freestyle S3 event at the 2008 Summer Paralympics took place at the Beijing National Aquatics Center on 13 September. There were two heats; the swimmers with the eight fastest times advanced to the final.

== Results ==
=== Heats ===
Competed from 10:26.

==== Heat 1 ====
Rank	Name	Nationality	Time	Notes
1	Xia Jiangbo	China	1:05.83	Q
2	Annke Conradi	Germany	1:07.76	Q
3	Esther Overton	Australia	1:11.99	Q
4	Sarah Shannon	South Africa	1:15.59	Q
5	Sara Carracelas	Spain	1:17.28	
6	Danielle Watts	Great Britain	1:28.74	PR
7	Maria Liaskou	Greece	1:29.31	

==== Heat 2 ====
Rank	Name	Nationality	Time	Notes
1	Yip Pin Xiu	Singapore	57.04	Q, WR
2	Patricia Valle	Mexico	59.84	Q
3	Fran Williamson	Great Britain	1:05.39	Q
4	Beth Kolbe	United States	1:11.69	Q
5	Perpetua Vaza	Portugal	1:16.18	
6	Fabiola Ramirez	Mexico	1:17.92	
7	Maria Kalpakidou	Greece	1:25.39	

=== Final ===
Competed at 19:26.

Rank	Name	Nationality	Time	Notes
1st place, gold medalist(s)	Patricia Valle	Mexico	57.05	
2nd place, silver medalist(s)	Yip Pin Xiu	Singapore	57.43	
3rd place, bronze medalist(s)	Fran Williamson	Great Britain	1:04.22	
4	Xia Jiangbo	China	1:08.32	
5	Beth Kolbe	United States	1:10.55	
6	Esther Overton	Australia	1:12.26	
7	Sarah Shannon	South Africa	1:13.39	
8	Annke Conradi	Germany	1:17.94	

Q = qualified for final. WR = World Record. PR = Paralympic Record.
