= Swimming at the 2004 Summer Paralympics – Women's 4 × 50 metre freestyle relay 20pts =

Women's 4x50m Freestyle 20 pts at the XII Paralympic Games
- Paralympic Swimming
- Venue: Olympic Aquatic Centre
- Dates: 24 September 2004
- Competitors: 7
- Winning time: 3:00.62

Medalists
1st place, gold medalist(s)		Erika Nara; Noriko Kajiwara; Takako Fujita; Mayumi Narita	Japan
2nd place, silver medalist(s)		Jeanette Chippington; Mhairi Love; Fran Williamson; Jane Stidever	Great Britain
3rd place, bronze medalist(s)		Stephanie Brooks; Melanie Benn; Casey Johnson; Cheryl Angelelli	United States

The Women's 4 x 50 metre freestyle relay 20pts swimming event at the 2004 Summer Paralympics was competed on 24 September. It was won by the team representing Japan.

== Final round ==
24 Sept. 2004, evening session

Rank	Team	Time	Notes
1st place, gold medalist(s)	Japan	3:00.62	WR
2nd place, silver medalist(s)	Great Britain	3:12.75	
3rd place, bronze medalist(s)	United States	3:12.80	
4	Spain	3:16.00	
5	Portugal	3:48.84	
6	Germany	3:50.79	
7	Mexico	4:07.09	

== Team Lists ==
Japan; Erika Nara; Noriko Kajiwara; Takako Fujita; Mayumi Narita	Great Britain; Jeanette Chippington; Mhairi Love; Fran Williamson; Jane Stidever	United States; Stephanie Brooks; Melanie Benn; Casey Johnson; Cheryl Angelelli	Spain; Teresa Perales; Vanesa Capo; Noelia Garcia; Amaia Zuazua
Portugal; Leila Marques; Susana Barroso; Maria Joao Morgado; Perpetua Vaza	Germany; Kirsten Bruhn; Christina Ziegler; Annke Conradi; Maria Goetze	Mexico; Doramitzi Gonzalez; Patricia Valle; Virginia Hernandez; Velia Flores	
