= Swimming at the 2004 Summer Paralympics – Women's 50 metre butterfly S4 =

Women's 50m Butterfly S4 at the XII Paralympic Games
- Paralympic Swimming
- Venue: Olympic Aquatic Centre
- Dates: 22 September 2004
- Competitors: 8 from 8 nations
- Winning time: 56.36

Medalists
1st place, gold medalist(s)		Sandra Erikson	Sweden
2nd place, silver medalist(s)		Patricia Valle	Mexico
3rd place, bronze medalist(s)		Anne Cecile Lequien	France

The Women's 50 metre butterfly S4 swimming event at the 2004 Summer Paralympics was competed on 22 September. It was won by Sandra Erikson, representing Sweden.

== Final round ==
22 Sept. 2004, evening session

Rank	Athlete	Time	Notes
1st place, gold medalist(s)	Sandra Erikson (SWE)	56.36	WR
2nd place, silver medalist(s)	Patricia Valle (MEX)	58.84	WR
3rd place, bronze medalist(s)	Anne Cecile Lequien (FRA)	1:07.91	
4	Sofiya Avramova (UKR)	1:11.74	
5	Regina Cachan (ESP)	1:19.15	
6	Karolina Hamer (POL)	1:19.82	
7	Elise Soland Olsen (NOR)	1:21.26	
	Karen Breumsoe (DEN)	DSQ	
