= Swimming at the 2016 Summer Paralympics – Women's 50 metre breaststroke =

The women's 50 metre breaststroke swimming events for the 2016 Summer Paralympics take place at the Rio Olympic Stadium from 8 to 15 September. Only one event was contested for one classification.

== Competition format ==
Each event consists of two rounds: heats and final. The top eight swimmers overall in the heats progress to the final. If there are eight or fewer swimmers in an event, no heats are held and all swimmers qualify for the final.

== Results ==
=== SB3 ===
19:24 14 September 2016:

Rank	Lane	Name	Nationality	Time	Notes
1st place, gold medalist(s)	4	Jiao Cheng	China	58.28	
2nd place, silver medalist(s)	6	Mariia Lafina	Ukraine	1:01.92	
3rd place, bronze medalist(s)	3	Patricia Valle	Mexico	1:02.40	
4	5	Olga Sviderska	Ukraine	1:03.20	
5	1	Patricia Pereira dos Santos	Brazil	1:07.42	
6	2	Arjola Trimi	Italy	1:07.69	
7	7	Yue Deng	China	1:08.49	
8	8	Rildene Firmino	Brazil	1:08.59	
