= Swimming at the 2020 Summer Paralympics – Women's 50 metre backstroke S2 =

Women's 50 metre backstroke S2 at the XVI Paralympic Games
- Venue: Tokyo Aquatics Centre
- Dates: 2 September 2021
- Competitors: 9 from 9 nations

Medalists
1st place, gold medalist(s)		Yip Pin Xiu	Singapore
2nd place, silver medalist(s)		Miyuki Yamada	Japan
3rd place, bronze medalist(s)		Feng Yazhu	China

The Women's 50 metre backstroke S2 event at the 2020 Paralympic Games took place on 2 September 2021, at the Tokyo Aquatics Centre.

== Heats ==
The swimmers with the top eight times, regardless of heat, advanced to the final.

Rank	Heat	Lane	Name	Nationality	Time	Notes
1	2	4	Yip Pin Xiu	Singapore	1:03.61	Q
2	1	3	Miyuki Yamada	Japan	1:09.44	Q
3	2	4	Fabiola Ramírez	Mexico	1:12.59	Q
4	2	3	Veronika Medchainova	RPC	1:13.23	Q
5	1	5	Angela Procida	Italy	1:14.16	Q
6	2	5	Feng Yazhu	China	1:17.58	Q
7	2	6	Zsanett Adami	Hungary	1:27.13	Q
8	2	2	Elif Ildem	Turkey	1:32.86	Q
9	1	6	Katarina Draganov Čordaš	Serbia	1:32.98	

== Final ==
50m backstroke final
Rank	Lane	Name	Nationality	Time	Notes
1st place, gold medalist(s)	4	Yip Pin Xiu	Singapore	1:02.04	
2nd place, silver medalist(s)	5	Miyuki Yamada	Japan	1:06.98	
3rd place, bronze medalist(s)	7	Feng Yazhu	China	1:11.55	
4	3	Fabiola Ramirez	Mexico	1:12.66	
5	2	Angela Procida	Italy	1:12.69	
6	6	Veronika Medchainova	RPC	1:14.59	
7	1	Zsanett Adami	Hungary	1:27.48	
8	8	Elif Ildem	Turkey	1:32.49	
