= Mexico at the Paralympics =

- IPC code: MEX
- NPC: Comité Paralímpico Mexicano
- Website: www.copame.org.mx (in Spanish)
- Medals: Gold 107 Silver 98 Bronze 123 Total 328

Summer appearances
- 1972; 1976; 1980; 1984; 1988; 1992; 1996; 2000; 2004; 2008; 2012; 2016; 2020; 2024

Winter appearances
- 2006; 2010; 2014; 2018; 2022; 2026

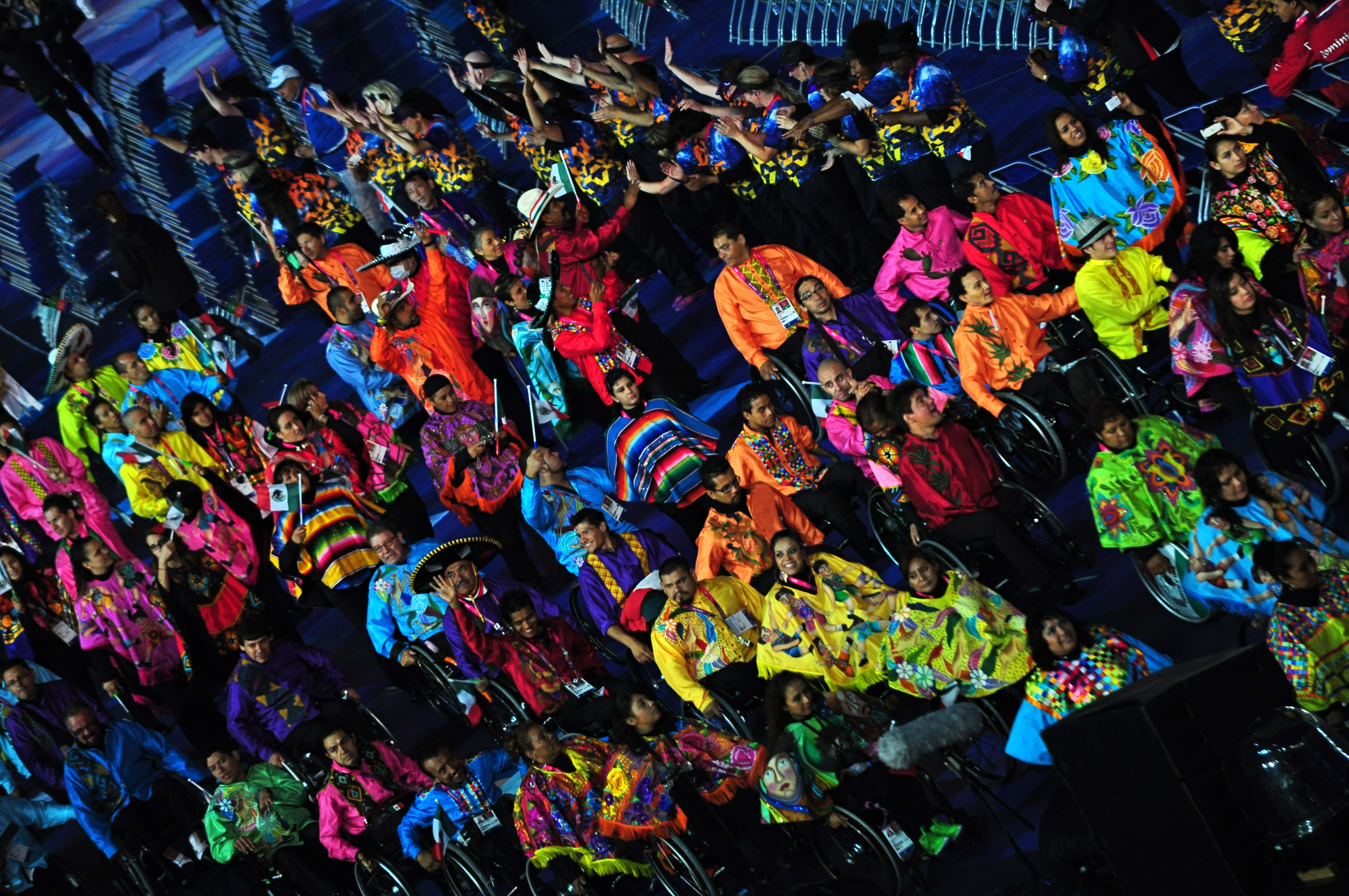
Paraylimpic team in London 2012

Mexico made its Paralympic Games debut at the 1972 Summer Paralympics in Heidelberg, with a delegation of seven athletes competing in track and field, swimming, weightlifting and wheelchair fencing. It has competed in every edition of the Summer Paralympics since then, and made its Winter Paralympics debut in 2006.

Mexican Paralympians have won a total of 328 medals, of which 107 are gold, 98 silver and 123 bronze, placing the Top-30 on the all-time Paralympic Games medal table. Although Mexicans did not win any medals at the 1972 Games, they swept up sixteen gold (fifteen in athletics, one in swimming) in 1976, along with fourteen silver and nine bronze, and continued to win medals during every subsequent edition of the Summer Games.

Among the most successful Mexican Paralympians, Josefina Cornejo won four gold medals in track and field at the 1976 Games, reiterating that result four years later. Runner Juana Soto also took four gold medals in 1980, as did Leticia Torres in 1988.

Mexican delegations at the Winter Games, by contrast, have been small (one competitor in 2006, two in 2010, and one each from 2014 to 2026), and have not won any medals.

== Medals ==
=== Medals by Summer Games ===
Games	Athletes	Gold medal	Silver medal	Bronze medal	Total	Rank by gold medals	Rank by total medals
(Italy) 1960 Rome	Did not participate						
(Japan) 1964 Tokyo	Did not participate						
(Israel) 1968 Tel-Aviv	Did not participate						
(West Germany) 1972 Heidelberg	7	0	0	0	0	—N/a	—N/a
(Canada) 1976 Toronto	32	16	14	9	39	12	13
(Netherlands) 1980 Arnhem	28	20	16	6	42	9	12
(United States) 1984 New York / (United Kingdom) Stoke Mandeville	54	6	14	17	37	25	20
(South Korea) 1988 Seoul	34	8	9	7	24	24	25
(Spain) 1992 Barcelona	19	0	1	10	11	46	25
(United States) 1996 Atlanta	38	3	5	4	12	31	31
(Australia) 2000 Sydney	77	10	12	12	34	17	15
(Greece) 2004 Athens	77	14	10	10	34	15	14
(China) 2008 Beijing	67	10	3	7	20	14	20
(United Kingdom) 2012 London	81	6	4	11	21	23	18
(Brazil) 2016 Rio de Janeiro	71	4	2	9	15	29	25
(Japan) 2020 Tokyo	60	7	2	13	22	20	18
(France) 2024 Paris	67	3	6	8	17	30	23
(United States) 2028 Los Angeles	Future event						
(Australia) 2032 Brisbane	Future event						
Total	641	107	98	123	328	22	20

=== Medals by Winter Games ===
Games	Athletes	Gold medal	Silver medal	Bronze medal	Total	Rank
1976-2002	Did not participate					
(Italy) 2006 Turin	1	0	0	0	0	-
(Canada) 2010 Vancouver	2	0	0	0	0	-
(Russia) 2014 Sochi	1	0	0	0	0	-
(South Korea) 2018 Pyeongchang	1	0	0	0	0	-
(China) 2022 Beijing	1	0	0	0	0	-
(Italy) 2026 Milan-Cortina	1	0	0	0	0	-
(France) 2030 French Alps	Future event					
(United States) 2034 Utah	Future event					
Total	7	0	0	0	0	-

=== Medals by Summer sport ===
Games	Gold	Silver	Bronze	Total
Archery	1	0	0	1
Athletics	69	70	71	210
Judo	3	1	3	7
Powerlifting	4	3	10	17
Swimming	29	20	35	84
Table Tennis	0	2	1	3
Taekwondo	1	1	1	3
Weightlifting	0	1	1	2
Wrestling	0	0	1	1
Total	107	98	123	328

=== Medals by Winter Sport ===
Games	Gold	Silver	Bronze	Total
Total	0	0	0	0

== Multi-medalists ==
Mexican athletes who have won at least three gold medals or five or more medals of any colour.

No.	Athlete	Sport	Years	Games	Gender	Gold	Silver	Bronze	Total
1	Josefina Cornejo	Athletics; Swimming; Table tennis	1976-1980	2	F	8	5	1	14
2	Juana Soto	Athletics	1980-1992	4	F	8	3	3	14
4	Martha Gustafson	Athletics; Swimming; Table tennis	1976-1980	2	F	6	6	0	12 (Note: Gustafson represented Mexico between 1976 and 1980. Subsequent medals were under Canadian representation.)
4	Doramitzi González	Swimming	2000-2016	5	F	5	3	3	11
5	Juan Ignacio Reyes	Swimming	2000-2016	5	M	5	1	1	7
6	Leticia Torres	Athletics	1988-2004	5	F	4	2	7	13
7	Amalia Pérez	Powerlifting	2000-2024	7	F	4	2	1	7
8	Arnulfo Castorena	Swimming	2000-2004, 2012, 2020-2024	5	M	4	2	1	7
9	Patricia Valle	Swimming	2000-2016	5	F	4	1	6	11
10	Salvador Hernández	Athletics	1996-2016, 2024	7	M	3	3	2	8
11	Mauro Máximo de Jesús	Athletics	1996-2012	5	M	2	3	1	6
12	Saúl Mendoza	Athletics	1988-2008	6	M	2	1	3	6

== See also ==
- Mexico at the Olympics
