= Swimming at the 2004 Summer Paralympics – Women's 50 metre backstroke S3 =

Women's 50m Backstroke S3 at the XII Paralympic Games
- Paralympic Swimming
- Venue: Olympic Aquatic Centre
- Dates: 27 September 2004
- Competitors: 8 from 6 nations
- Winning time: 1:04.88

Medalists
1st place, gold medalist(s)		Annke Conradi	Germany
2nd place, silver medalist(s)		Fran Williamson	Great Britain
3rd place, bronze medalist(s)		Susana Barroso	Portugal

The Women's 50 metre backstroke S3 swimming event at the 2004 Summer Paralympics was competed on 27 September. It was won by Annke Conradi, representing Germany.

== Final round ==
27 Sept. 2004, evening session

Rank	Athlete	Time	Notes
1st place, gold medalist(s)	Annke Conradi (GER)	1:04.88	
2nd place, silver medalist(s)	Fran Williamson (GBR)	1:07.20	
3rd place, bronze medalist(s)	Susana Barroso (POR)	1:09.32	
4	Elise Soland Olsen (NOR)	1:14.72	
5	Amaia Zuazua (ESP)	1:16.54	
6	Patricia Valle (MEX)	1:19.85	
7	Sonia Garcia (ESP)	1:25.56	
8	Perpetua Vaza (POR)	1:25.74	
