= Swimming at the 2020 Summer Paralympics – Women's 100 metre backstroke S2 =

Women's 100 metre backstroke S2 at the XVI Paralympic Games
- Venue: Tokyo Aquatics Centre
- Dates: 25 August 2021
- Competitors: 9 from 9 nations

Medalists
1st place, gold medalist(s)		Yip Pin Xiu	Singapore
2nd place, silver medalist(s)		Miyuki Yamada	Japan
3rd place, bronze medalist(s)		Fabiola Ramirez	Mexico

The Women's 100 metre backstroke S2 event at the 2020 Paralympic Games took place on 25 August 2021 at the Tokyo Aquatics Centre.

== Heats ==
The swimmers with the top eight times, regardless of heat, advanced to the final.

Rank	Heat	Lane	Name	Nationality	Time	Notes
1	2	4	Yip Pin Xiu	Singapore	2:14.46	Q
2	2	5	Feng Yazhu	China	2:32.44	Q
3	1	4	Miyuki Yamada	Japan	2:34.35	Q
4	2	3	Angela Procida	Italy	2:40.54	Q
5	1	3	Veronika Medchainova	RPC	2:40.97	Q
6	1	5	Fabiola Ramirez	Mexico	2:52.80	Q
7	2	6	Zsanett Adámi	Hungary	3:09.16	Q
8	1	6	Elif Ildem	Turkey	3:16.84	Q
9	2	2	Katarina Draganov Čordaš	Serbia	3:28.25	

== Final ==
Rank	Lane	Name	Nationality	Time	Notes
1st place, gold medalist(s)	4	Yip Pin Xiu	Singapore	2:16.61	
2nd place, silver medalist(s)	3	Miyuki Yamada	Japan	2:26.18	
3rd place, bronze medalist(s)	7	Fabiola Ramirez	Mexico	2:36.54	
4	5	Feng Yazhu	China	2:37.04	
5	2	Veronika Medchainova	RPC	2:40.05	
6	6	Angela Procida	Italy	2:43.58	
7	1	Zsanett Adámi	Hungary	3:11.88	
8	8	Elif Ildem	Turkey	3:13.39	
