= Miyuki Yamada =

Japanese Paralympic swimmer (born 2006)

Personal information
- Born: 15 September 2006 (age 19)

Sport
- Country: Japan
- Sport: Paralympic swimming
- Disability class: S2
Medal record
Paralympic swimming
Representing Japan
Paralympic Games
Silver medal – second place	2020 Tokyo	50 m backstroke S2
Silver medal – second place	2020 Tokyo	100 m backstroke S2

Miyuki Yamada (born 15 September 2006) is a Japanese Paralympic swimmer. She represented Japan at the 2020 Summer Paralympics.

== Career ==
Yamada represented Japan at the 2020 Summer Paralympics in the 50 metre backstroke S2 event and won silver. She also competed in the 100 metre backstroke S2 event and won a silver medal.
