= Mexico at the 2018 Winter Paralympics =

- IPC code: MEX
- NPC: Federacion Mexicana de Deporte

in Sochi
- Competitors: 1 in 1 sport
- Flag bearer: Arly Velásquez
- Medals: Gold 0 Silver 0 Bronze 0 Total 0

Winter Paralympics appearances (overview)
- 2006; 2010; 2014; 2018; 2022; 2026

Mexico participated in the 2018 Winter Paralympics in Pyeongchang, South Korea. Their sole competitor is para-alpine skier Arly Velásquez. This marks their fourth Winter Paralympics. They first went to the 2006 Winter Paralympics in Turin. Mexico's best winter sport is para-alpine skiing.

== Team ==
As mentioned the team's sole representative is para-alpine skier Arly Velásquez.

The table below contains the list of members of people (called "Team Mexico") that will be participating in the 2018 Games.

Team Mexico
Name	Sport	Gender	Classification	Events	ref
Arly Velásquez	para-alpine skiing	male	LW11		

== History ==
Mexico arrives in Pyeongchang to compete in their fourth Winter Paralympics. They first went to the 2006 Winter Paralympics in Turin. Mexico's best winter sport is para-alpine skiing.

=== Alpine skiing ===
For the super combined event, the first run is the super-G and the second run is the slalom.

Men

Athlete	Class	Event	Run 1		Run 2		Total	
Athlete	Class	Event	Time	Rank	Time	Rank	Time	Rank
Arly Velasquez	LW10-1	Downhill, sitting	—N/a				DNF	
Arly Velasquez	LW10-1	Super-G, sitting	—N/a				1:32.67	17
Arly Velasquez	LW10-1	Giant slalom, sitting	DNF		—N/a			
