= Swimming at the 2004 Summer Paralympics – Women's 50 metre freestyle S3 =

Women's 50m Freestyle S3 at the XII Paralympic Games
- Paralympic Swimming
- Venue: Olympic Aquatic Centre
- Dates: 25 September 2004
- Competitors: 9 from 6 nations
- Winning time: 58.16

Medalists
1st place, gold medalist(s)		Patricia Valle	Mexico
2nd place, silver medalist(s)		Fran Williamson	Great Britain
3rd place, bronze medalist(s)		Annke Conradi	Germany

The Women's 50 metre freestyle S3 swimming event at the 2004 Summer Paralympics was competed on 25 September. It was won by Patricia Valle, representing Mexico.

== 1st round ==
Qualified for final round

Heat 1

25 Sept. 2004, morning session

Rank	Athlete	Time	Notes
1	Annke Conradi (GER)	1:06.40	
2	Susana Barroso (POR)	1:16.54	
3	Perpetua Vaza (POR)	1:18.57	
4	Christina Ziegler (GER)	1:28.66	

Heat 2

25 Sept. 2004, morning session

Rank	Athlete	Time	Notes
1	Patricia Valle (MEX)	1:01.17	
2	Fran Williamson (GBR)	1:08.15	
3	Elise Soland Olsen (NOR)	1:14.41	
4	Amaia Zuazua (ESP)	1:16.34	
5	Sonia Garcia (ESP)	1:22.96	

== Final round ==
25 Sept. 2004, evening session

Rank	Athlete	Time	Notes
1st place, gold medalist(s)	Patricia Valle (MEX)	58.16	WR
2nd place, silver medalist(s)	Fran Williamson (GBR)	1:06.57	
3rd place, bronze medalist(s)	Annke Conradi (GER)	1:06.60	
4	Susana Barroso (POR)	1:09.00	
5	Elise Soland Olsen (NOR)	1:13.68	
6	Amaia Zuazua (ESP)	1:15.53	
7	Perpetua Vaza (POR)	1:20.36	
8	Sonia Garcia (ESP)	1:24.81	
