= Beijing Institute of Technology Gymnasium =

Sports venue in Beijing, China

Coordinates: 39°57′28″N 116°18′30″E

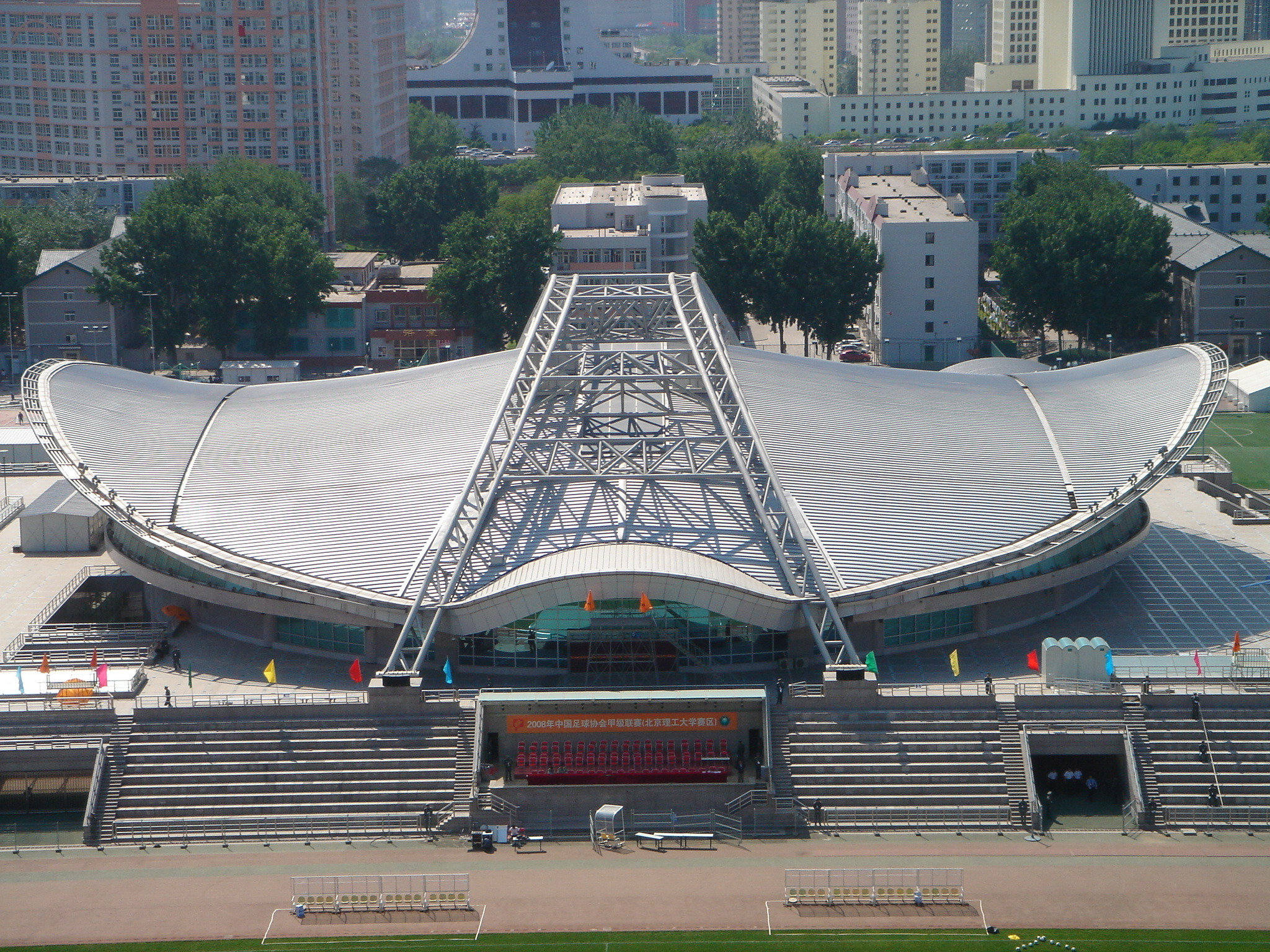
- The Stadium from above
- Interactive map of Beijing Institute of Technology Gymnasium
- Location: Beijing Institute of Technology
- Owner: Beijing Institute of Technology
- Capacity: 5,000

Construction
- Opened: 2008

Tenant
- Beijing Institute of Technology

Beijing Institute of Technology Gymnasium (simplified Chinese: 北京理工大学体育馆; traditional Chinese: 北京理工大學體育館; pinyin: Běijīng Lǐgōng Dàxué Tǐyùguǎn) is a 5,000-seat indoor arena located on the campus of Beijing Institute of Technology in Beijing, China. It hosted volleyball competitions at the 2008 Summer Olympics and the goalball competition at the 2008 Summer Paralympics.
