= Armando Ruiz =

Mexican alpine skier

Juan Armando Ruiz Hernández is a lawyer from Mexico City, who represented Mexico in the 2010 Paralympics, under the Alpine skiing discipline and represented Mexico in the 2006 Paralympics. He was the lone Mexican competitor in the 2006 Torino paralympic games, however Arly Velásquez joined him in representing Mexico in 2010.

Paralympics
Preceded by Saúl Mendoza	Flagbearer for Mexico; Vancouver 2010	Succeeded by Patricia Valle

== See also ==
- Mexico at the 2006 Winter Paralympics
- Mexico at the 2010 Winter Paralympics
- 2010 Winter Paralympics national flag bearers
