= Mexico at the 2006 Winter Paralympics =

- IPC code: MEX
- NPC: Federacion Mexicana de Deporte

in Turin
- Competitors: 1 in 1 sport
- Medals: Gold 0 Silver 0 Bronze 0 Total 0

Winter Paralympics appearances (overview)
- 2006; 2010; 2014; 2018; 2022; 2026

Mexico participated in the ninth Winter Paralympics in Turin, Italy, entering one athlete. Mexico was the only nation participating in the 2006 Winter Paralympics that did not send a delegation to the 2006 Winter Olympics.

Alpine skier Armando Ruiz (LW 11, b. August 27, 1963), a lawyer from Mexico City, competed in the giant slalom, finishing 41st out of 41 finishers in the men's sitting category with a combined two-run adjusted time of 5:43.45, nearly four minutes behind winner Martin Braxenthaler of Germany and nearly three minutes behind 40th-place finisher Xavier Barios of Andorra. It was the first ski race he had ever competed in, and he received a huge ovation from the crowd after completing each run.

Ruiz was one of the 3 men finalists for the Whang Youn Dai Overcome Prize of the Paralympic Games.

== See also ==
- 2006 Winter Paralympics
- Mexico at the 2006 Winter Olympics
