= Arly Velásquez =

Mexican Paralympic alpine skier (born 1988)

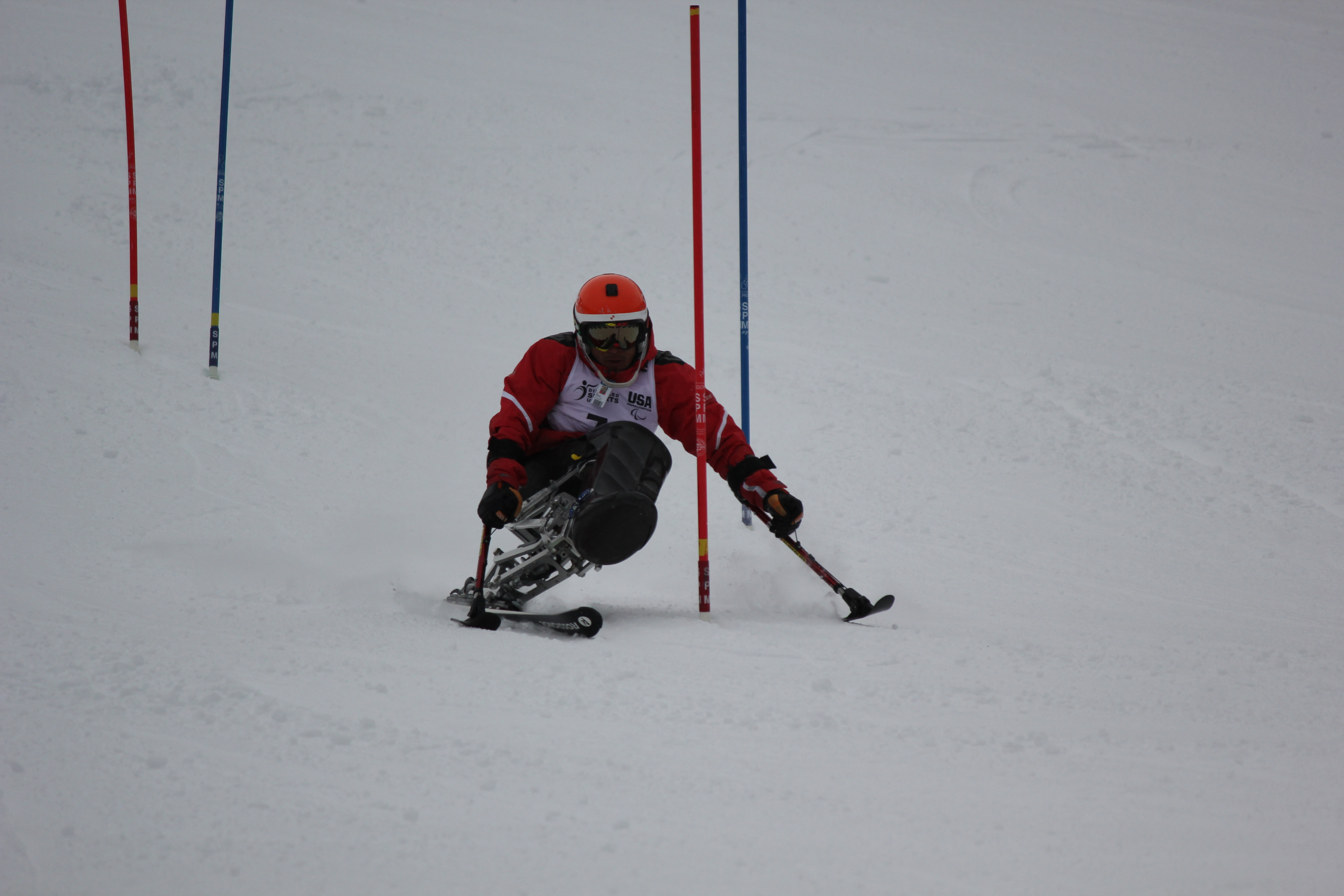
Arly Velásquez at the 2012 IPC NorAm Cup

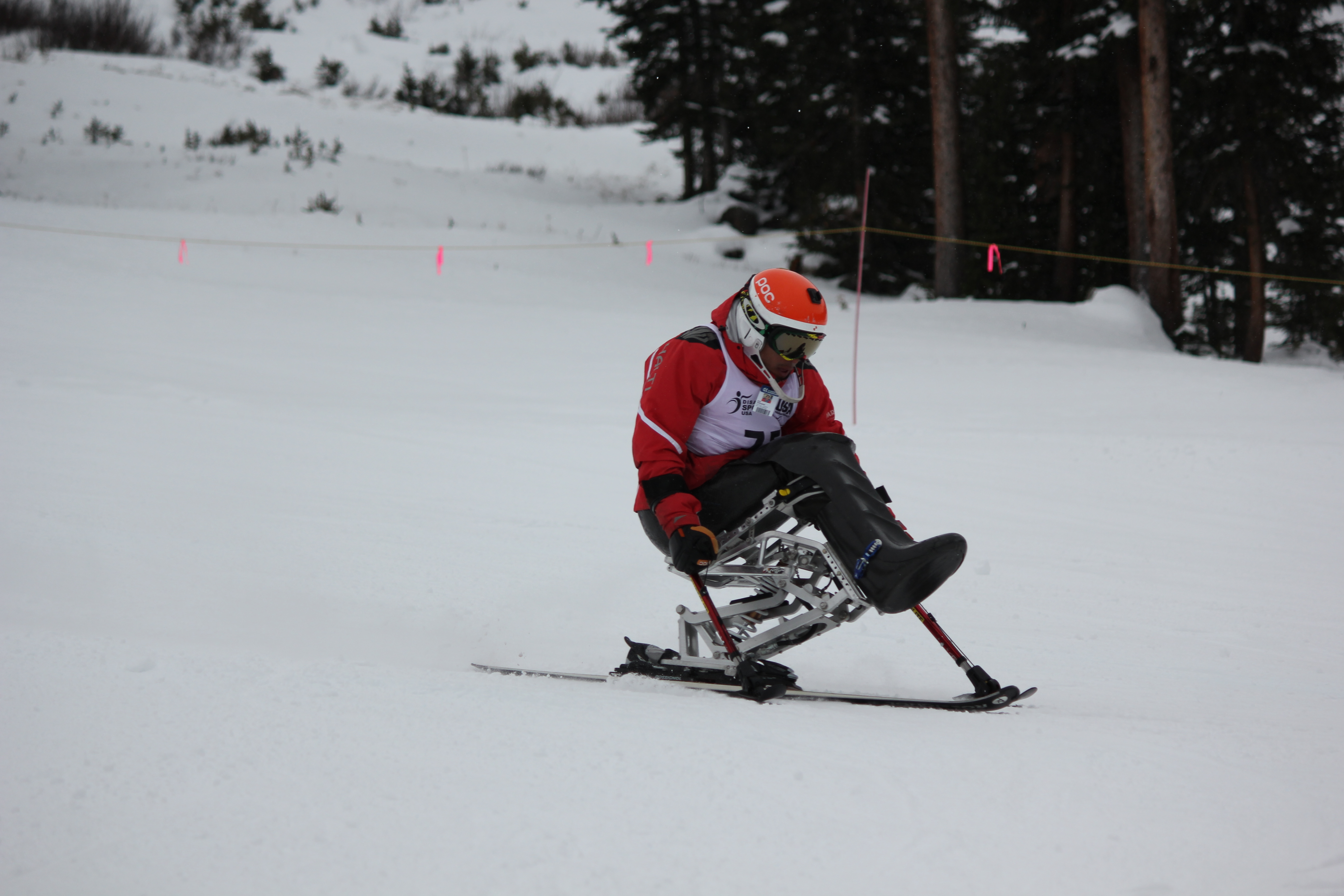
Arly Velásquez at the 2012 IPC NorAm Cup

Arly Aristides Velásquez Peñaloza (Note: In this Spanish name, the first or paternal surname is Velásquez and the second or maternal family name is Peñaloza.) (born August 17, 1988) is a Paralympian who represented Mexico at the 2010 Winter Paralympics, along with teammate Armando Ruiz. Velasquez broke his back in a mountain biking accident in 2001. After trying many wheelchair sports, such as shot put, wheelchair basketball and tennis, he discovered the sport of mono-skiing. Mono-skiing is similar to skiing for able-bodied however, athletes sit on a single ski with crutch-like ski poles using their hips to make turns. Velásquez also represented Mexico at the 2014, 2018 and 2022 Winter Paralympics, and competed again at the 2026 edition.

== Biography ==
At 13 years of age, Velásquez suffered an accident that left him with broken vertebrae and an irreversible spinal cord injury. He was informed he would never walk again and would be bedridden for the rest of his life. Despite his accident, at age 15 he attempted several wheelchair sports, such as shot put, wheelchair basketball, wheel chair javelin and swimming, before discovering the sport of mono-skiing.

Velásquez pursued film studies in Argentina.

== Notes ==
Paralympics
Preceded by Patricia Valle	Flagbearer for Mexico; Sochi 2014	Succeeded by Nely Miranda
Preceded by Nely Miranda	Flagbearer for Mexico; Pyeongchang 2018	Succeeded by Diego López Díaz and Amalia Pérez
Preceded by Diego López Díaz and Amalia Pérez	Flagbearer for Mexico; Beijing 2022	Succeeded by Salvador Hernández and Fabiola Ramírez
Preceded by Salvador Hernández and Fabiola Ramírez	Flagbearer for Mexico; Milano Cortina 2026	Succeeded by Incumbent
