= Mexico at the 2014 Winter Paralympics =

- IPC code: MEX
- NPC: Federacion Mexicana de Deporte

in Sochi
- Competitors: 1 in 1 sport
- Flag bearer: Arly Velásquez
- Medals: Gold 0 Silver 0 Bronze 0 Total 0

Winter Paralympics appearances (overview)
- 2006; 2010; 2014; 2018; 2022; 2026

Mexico competed at the 2014 Winter Paralympics in Sochi, Russia, held between 7–16 March 2014. This was Mexico's third appearance at a Winter Paralympic Games. They were represented by a single athlete, alpine skier Arly Velásquez, who was participating in his second Paralympics. His best finish was 11th place in the sitting super-G.

== Background ==
Mexico first joined Paralympic competition at the 1972 Summer Paralympics, and have competed at every Summer Paralympics since. They did not enter a Winter Paralympics until the 2006 Winter Paralympics. Sochi was Mexico's third appearance at a Winter Paralympic Games. Although Mexico has won many medals at the Summer Paralympics, they have never won a Winter Paralympic medal. Arly Velásquez, an alpine skier, was the only athlete sent by Mexico to Sochi. Velásquez was chosen as the Mexican flag-bearer for the parade of nations during the opening ceremony, and for the closing ceremony.

== Disability classification ==
Every participant at the Paralympics has their disability grouped into one of five disability categories: amputation, the condition may be congenital or sustained through injury or illness; cerebral palsy; wheelchair athletes, though there is often overlap between this and other categories; visual impairment, including blindness; and Les autres, any physical disability that does not fall strictly under one of the other categories, like dwarfism or multiple sclerosis. Each Paralympic sport then has its own classifications, dependent upon the specific physical demands of competition. Events are given a code, made of numbers and letters, describing the type of event and classification of the athletes competing. Events with "B" in the code are for athletes with visual impairment, codes LW1 to LW9 are for athletes who stand to compete and LW10 to LW12 are for athletes who compete sitting down. Alpine skiing events grouped athletes into separate competitions for sitting, standing and visually impaired athletes.

== Alpine skiing ==
Velásquez was 25 years old at the time of the Sochi Paralympics. Velásquez suffered a spinal cord injury that left him without feeling below his nipples, and he competes in a sitting position, classified as an LW11. He had previously worked as a composer, and took up competitive skiing in 2008. On 8 March, he skied in the downhill, and suffered a crash that The New York Times called "horrific". The next day, in the Super-G, he said his goal was to finish in the top 15. In that race, he finished with a time of 1 minute and 30 seconds, 11 seconds behind the gold medallist, Akira Kano of Japan, and in 11th place overall, beating his goal. This was the best Winter Paralympics finish by any Latin American athlete up to this point. On 15 March, in the giant slalom, he finished the first run in a time of 1 minute and 25 seconds, but he was unable to finish the second leg. He was scheduled to compete in the super combined but ultimately did not do so. Due to injuries suffered in Sochi, he required surgery and was out of competition for two years. He returned to compete for Mexico at the 2018 Winter Paralympics.

Athlete	Event	Run 1			Run 2			Final/total			Source(s)
Athlete	Event	Time	Diff	Rank	Time	Diff	Rank	Time	Diff	Rank	Source(s)
Arly Velásquez	Downhill, sitting	—N/a						DNF			
Arly Velásquez	Super-G, sitting	—N/a						1:30.57	+11.06	11	
Arly Velásquez	Giant slalom, sitting	1:25.14	+7.04	17	DNF						

== See also ==
- Mexico at the Paralympics
- Mexico at the 2014 Winter Olympics
