= Mexico at the 2010 Winter Paralympics =

- IPC code: MEX
- NPC: Federacion Mexicana de Deporte

in Vancouver
- Competitors: 2 in 1 sport
- Flag bearer: Juan Armando Ruiz Hernandez
- Medals: Gold 0 Silver 0 Bronze 0 Total 0

Winter Paralympics appearances (overview)
- 2006; 2010; 2014; 2018; 2022; 2026

Mexico sent a delegation to compete at the 2010 Winter Paralympics in Vancouver, British Columbia, Canada. The country fielded two athletes, both in alpine skiing.

== Alpine skiing ==
Mexico's two representatives in alpine skiing were Arly Velásquez and Armando Ruiz.

Athlete	Event	Final					
Athlete	Event	Run 1	Rank	Run 2	Rank	Total Time	Final Rank
Arly Velásquez	Giant slalom	1:45.67	32	2:12.88	26	3:58.55	26
Arly Velásquez	Slalom	1:41.84	40	1:35.6	33	3:17.41	33
Armando Ruiz	Giant slalom	2:27.02	36	3:00.10	27	5:27.12	27
Armando Ruiz	Slalom	2:07.22	42	2:06.5	34	4:13.67	35

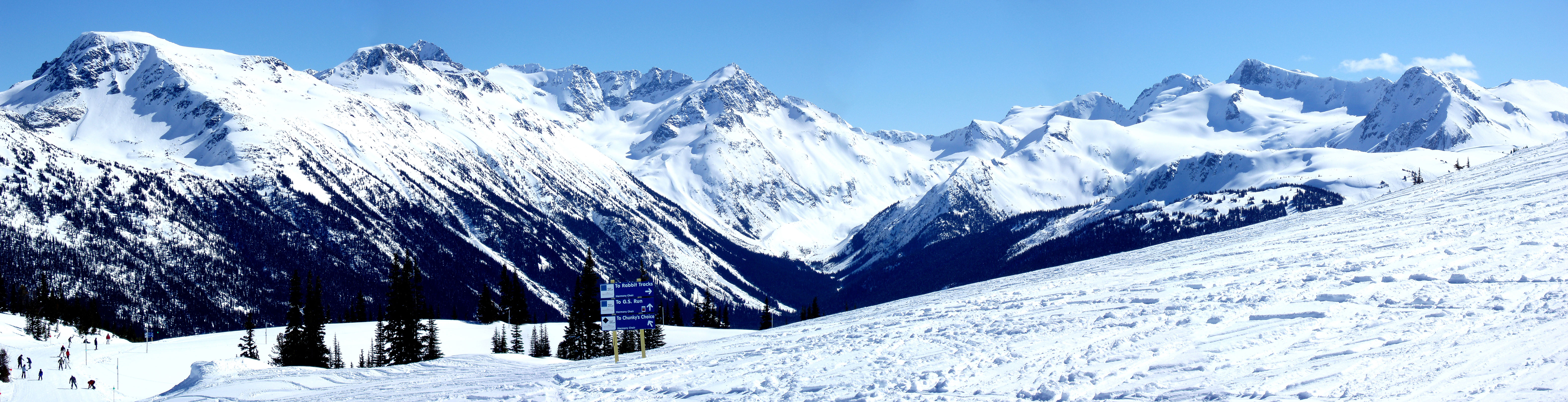
Panorama of the Whistler Blackcomb resort, the official alpine skiing venue for the 2010 Olympic and Paralympic Winter Games.

== See also ==
- Mexico at the 2010 Winter Olympics
