= Swimming at the 2004 Summer Paralympics – Women's 100 metre freestyle S3 =

Women's 100m Freestyle S3 at the XII Paralympic Games
- Paralympic Swimming
- Venue: Olympic Aquatic Centre
- Dates: 19 September 2004
- Competitors: 9 from 6 nations
- Winning time: 2:08.09

Medalists
1st place, gold medalist(s)		Patricia Valle	Mexico
2nd place, silver medalist(s)		Annke Conradi	Germany
3rd place, bronze medalist(s)		Fran Williamson	Great Britain

The Women's 100 metre freestyle S3 swimming event at the 2004 Summer Paralympics was competed on 19 September. It was won by Patricia Valle, representing Mexico.

== 1st round ==
Qualified for final round

Heat 1

19 Sept. 2004, morning session

Rank	Athlete	Time	Notes
1	Annke Conradi (GER)	2:17.27	
2	Susana Barroso (POR)	2:28.95	
3	Elise Soland Olsen (NOR)	2:45.52	
4	Perpetua Vaza (POR)	2:51.98	

Heat 2

19 Sept. 2004, morning session

Rank	Athlete	Time	Notes
1	Patricia Valle (MEX)	2:07.78	
2	Fran Williamson (GBR)	2:20.75	
3	Amaia Zuazua (ESP)	2:34.45	
4	Christina Ziegler (GER)	3:01.96	
5	Sonia Garcia (ESP)	3:02.20	

== Final round ==
19 Sept. 2004, evening session

Rank	Athlete	Time	Notes
1st place, gold medalist(s)	Patricia Valle (MEX)	2:08.09	
2nd place, silver medalist(s)	Annke Conradi (GER)	2:16.24	
3rd place, bronze medalist(s)	Fran Williamson (GBR)	2:19.06	
4	Susana Barroso (POR)	2:32.66	
5	Amaia Zuazua (ESP)	2:34.14	
6	Elise Soland Olsen (NOR)	2:44.23	
7	Perpetua Vaza (POR)	2:47.15	
8	Christina Ziegler (GER)	3:01.40	
