= 2015 IPC Swimming World Championships – Women's 150 metre individual medley =

The women's 150 metre individual medley at the 2015 IPC Swimming World Championships was held at the Tollcross International Swimming Centre in Glasgow, United Kingdom from 13 to 17 July.

== Medalists ==
Event	Gold		Silver		Bronze	
SM4	Nely Miranda Herrera (SM4); Mexico	3:06.48 AM	Mariia Lafina (SM4); Ukraine	3:07.31	Olga Sviderska (SM3); Ukraine	3:08.32 WR

Legend
WR: World record, CR: Championship record, AF: Africa record, AM: Americas record, AS: Asian record, EU: European record, OS: Oceania record

== See also ==
- List of IPC world records in swimming
