= Mexico at the 2026 Winter Paralympics =

- Flag of Mexico
- IPC code: MEX
- NPC: Comité Paralímpico Mexicano
- Website: www.copame.org.mx (in Spanish)

in Milan and Cortina d'Ampezzo, Italy 6 March 2026 – 15 March 2026
- Competitors: 1 (1 man) in 1 sport
- Flag bearer (opening): Arly Velásquez
- Flag bearer (closing): Arly Velásquez
- Medals: Gold 0 Silver 0 Bronze 0 Total 0

Winter Paralympics appearances (overview)
- 2006; 2010; 2014; 2018; 2022; 2026

Mexico competed at the 2026 Winter Paralympics in Milan and Cortina d'Ampezzo, Italy from 6 to 15 March 2026.

One alpine skier, Arly Velásquez, represented the country and competed for the fifth consecutive time at the Winter Paralympics.

== Competitors ==
The following is a list of the number of competitors who participated at the Games per sport/discipline.

| Sport | Men | Women | Total |
|---|---|---|---|
| Para alpine skiing | 1 | 0 | 1 |
| Total | 1 | 0 | 1 |

== Alpine skiing ==
One alpine skier represented the country. He was scheduled to compete in three events in the category LW10-1. However, he suffered an injury during a training session before the giant slalom and could not participate in it.

| Athlete | Event | Run 1 | | Run 2 | | Total | |
| Athlete | Event | Time | Rank | Time | Rank | Time | Rank |
|---|---|---|---|---|---|---|---|
| Arly Velásquez | Men's downhill, sitting | —N/a | | | | DNF | |
| Arly Velásquez | Men's super-G, sitting | —N/a | | | | 1:21.53 | 15 |

== See also ==
- Mexico at the Paralympics
- Mexico at the 2026 Winter Olympics
