= 2018 World Para Swimming European Championships – Women's 150 metres individual medley =

The women's 150 metres individual medley at the 2018 World Para Swimming European Championships was held at the National Aquatic Centre in Dublin from 13 to 19 August. A single classification final was held in all over this event.

== Medalists ==
Event	Gold		Silver		Bronze	
SM4	Maryna Verbova (UKR)	3:08.12	Olga Sviderska (UKR)	3:11.80	Gina Böttcher (GER)	3:29.97
WR world record | AR area record | CR championship record | GR games record | NR national record | OR Olympic record | PB personal best | SB season best | WL world leading (in a given season)

== See also ==
- List of IPC world records in swimming
