= Mexico at the 2022 Winter Paralympics =

- Flag of Mexico
- IPC code: MEX
- NPC: Federacion Mexicana de Deporte

in Beijing, China 4 March 2022 – 13 March 2022
- Competitors: 1 (1 man) in 1 sport
- Flag bearer: Arly Velásquez
- Medals: Gold 0 Silver 0 Bronze 0 Total 0

Winter Paralympics appearances (overview)
- 2006; 2010; 2014; 2018; 2022; 2026

Mexico competed at the 2022 Winter Paralympics in Beijing, China which took place between 4–13 March 2022. One alpine skier competed.

== Competitors ==
The following is the list of number of competitors participating at the Games per sport/discipline.

Sport	Men	Women	Total
Alpine skiing	1	0	1
Total	1	0	1

== Alpine skiing ==
One alpine skier represented Mexico.

Athlete	Event	Run 1		Run 2		Total	
Athlete	Event	Time	Rank	Time	Rank	Time	Rank
Arly Velásquez	Men's giant slalom, sitting	DNF		—N/a			

== See also ==
- Mexico at the Paralympics
- Mexico at the 2022 Winter Olympics
