= Maryna Verbova =

Ukrainian Paralympic swimmer

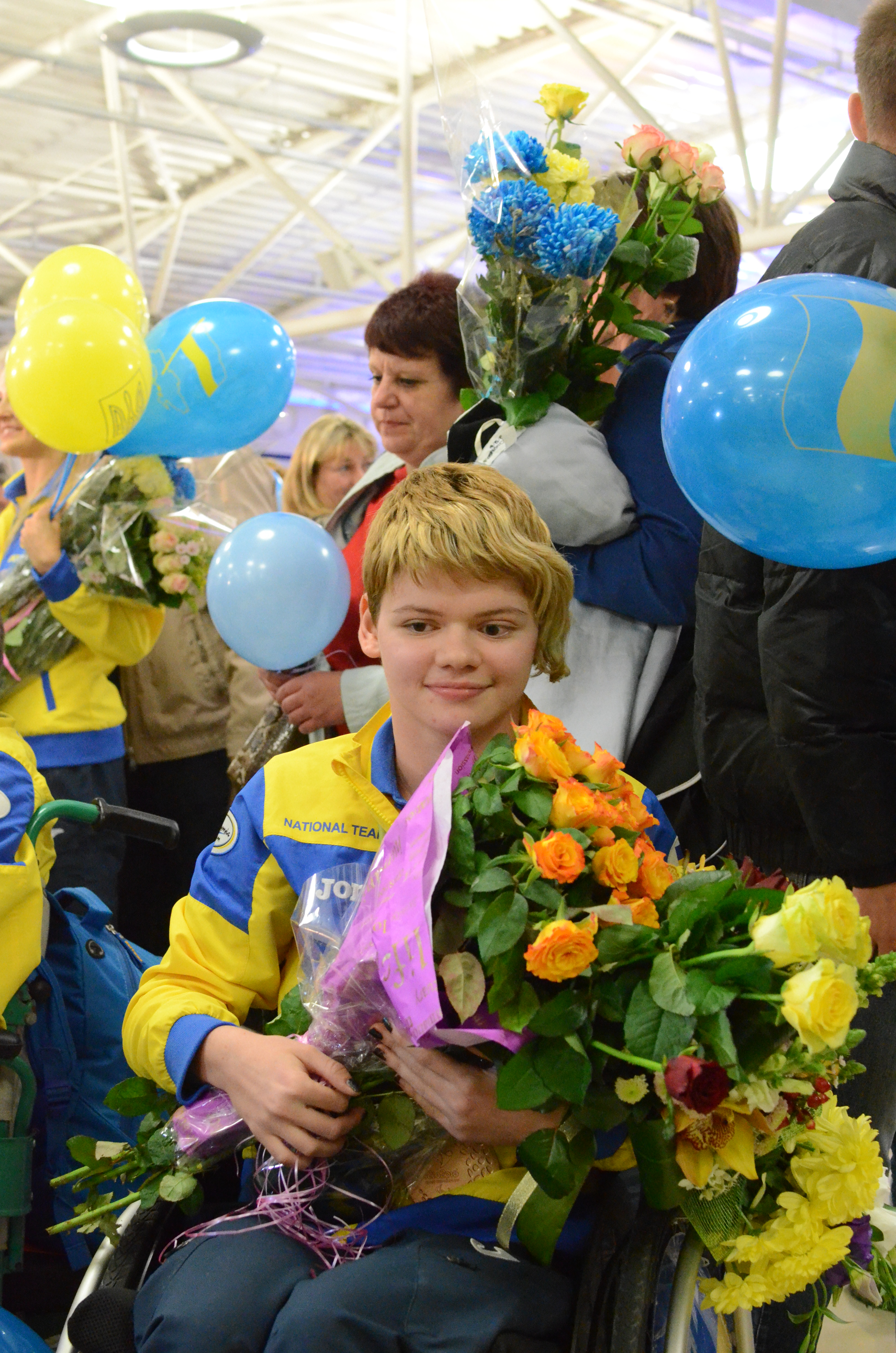
- Maryna Verbova (2016)

Personal information
- Born: 5 August 1998 (age 28)

Sport
- Country: Ukraine
- Sport: Paralympic swimming
- Disability: Cerebral palsy
- Disability class: S4
Medal record
Paralympic Games
Bronze medal – third place	2016 Rio de Janeiro	50 m backstroke S4
European Championships
Bronze medal – third place	2026 Kocaeli	50 m breaststroke SB3
Bronze medal – third place	2026 Kocaeli	4×50 m medley 20pts

Maryna Verbova (born 5 August 1998) is a Ukrainian Paralympic swimmer competing in S4-classification events. She represented Ukraine at the 2016 Summer Paralympics and she won the bronze medal in the women's 50 metre backstroke S4 event. She also competed at the 2020 Summer Paralympics in Tokyo, Japan.

== Career ==
She won the silver medal in the women's 50 metre backstroke S4 event at the 2014 IPC Swimming European Championships held in Eindhoven, the Netherlands.

At the 2018 World Para Swimming European Championships she won the gold medal in the women's 150 metres individual medley S4 and the silver medal in the women's 50 metres backstroke S4 event.
