= Melanie Benn =

American Paralympic swimmer

Personal information
- Born: Hillcrest, San Diego, California, U.S.

Sport
- Country: United States
- Sport: Paralympic swimming
- Disability: Survivor of meningococcal disease
- Disability class: S4
- Coached by: Alan Voisard
Medal record
Paralympic swimming
Representing United States
Paralympic Games
Silver medal – second place	2000 Sydney	Women's 4x50m freestyle relay 20pts
Silver medal – second place	2004 Athens	Women's 50m freestyle S4
Bronze medal – third place	2004 Athens	Women's 100m freestyle S4
Bronze medal – third place	2004 Athens	Women's 4x50m freestyle relay 20pts

Melanie Benn is a former American Paralympic swimmer who is a quadruple amputee after contracting meningococcemia. She now works as a social worker and raises her awareness of the contraction of blood disease and importance of immunization relating to her disability.

== Contraction of disease ==
On Christmas Eve 1995 while studying psychology at Humboldt State University, Benn was aged 18 and had the first signs of the disease when she had difficulty walking along with burning pain in her legs and numbness on the right side of her body. She went to the emergency room to see a doctor after her mother concerned with the symptoms that Benn was showing, within one hour of arriving at the hospital she went into shock and was admitted into the intensive care unit where she was under supervision with doctors who took various tests to determine the diagnosis. After she received the diagnosis of meningococcemia, a rare and fatal bacterial blood infection, she was forced to have her arms amputated below the elbows and legs above the knee to save her life after contracting gangrene from kidney failure and poor blood circulation.

== Swimming career ==
Benn started swimming after she received a kidney transplant from her father and began rehabilitation. She began long-distance swimming by competing in a 1.2 mile open water swimming event at La Jolla, California where she was noticed by a triathlon coach who trained with disabled swimmers.

Benn's teammate Joe McCarthy, who too is a disabled due to paralysis, encouraged her to compete in the Paralympics and participate in the Paralympic trials in Indianapolis in June 2000. She qualified to compete in the 2000 Paralympic Games where she won a silver medal then won a silver and two bronze medals at 2004 Summer Paralympics.
