= Cecilie Kristiansen =

Danish Paralympic swimmer (born 1990)

Personal information
- Born: 6 July 1990 (age 35) Thisted, Denmark

Sport
- Sport: Paralympic swimming
- Disability class: S4
Medal record
Representing Denmark
World Championships
Bronze medal – third place	2010 Eindhoven	50m breaststroke SB2
Bronze medal – third place	2010 Eindhoven	150m individual medley SM3
European Championships
Bronze medal – third place	2009 Reykjavik	100m freestyle S4
Bronze medal – third place	2011 Berlin	50m breaststroke SB2
Bronze medal – third place	2014 Eindhoven	50m breaststroke SB2

Cecilie Møller Kristiansen (born 6 July 1990) is a Danish retired Paralympic swimmer who competed at international swimming competitions. She is a two-time World and three-time European bronze medalist. She competed at the 2008 Summer Paralympics but did not medal.

Kristiansen was born with shortened femurs and no right arm.
