= Cheryl Angelelli =

American Paralympic swimmer (born 1968)

Personal information
- Nationality: American
- Born: August 1, 1968 (age 57)

Sport
- Country: United States
- Sport: Paralympic swimming
- Disability: Spinal cord injury (quadriplegia)
- Disability class: S4, SB3, SM4
- Retired: 2013
Medal record
Paralympic swimming
Representing United States
Paralympic Games
Silver medal – second place	2008 Beijing	Women's 50m freestyle S4
Silver medal – second place	2008 Beijing	Women's 100m freestyle S4
Bronze medal – third place	2004 Athens	Women's 200m freestyle S4
Bronze medal – third place	2004 Athens	Women's 4x50m freestyle relay
World Championships (Long Course)
Gold medal – first place	2006 Durban	Women's 100m freestyle S4
Gold medal – first place	2006 Durban	Women's 200m freestyle S4
Silver medal – second place	2002 Mar del Plata	Women's 4x50m freestyle relay
Silver medal – second place	2002 Mar del Plata	Women's 4x50m medley relay
Silver medal – second place	2006 Durban	Women's 50m freestyle S4
Silver medal – second place	2010 Eindhoven	Women's 100m freestyle S4
Silver medal – second place	2010 Eindhoven	Women's 200m freestyle S4
Bronze medal – third place	2013 Montreal	Women's 4x50m medley relay
World Championships (Short Course)
Gold medal – first place	2009 Rio de Janeiro	Women's 50m freestyle S4
Gold medal – first place	2009 Rio de Janeiro	Women's 100m freestyle S4
Gold medal – first place	2009 Rio de Janeiro	Women's 4x50m freestyle relay
Gold medal – first place	2009 Rio de Janeiro	Women's 4x50m medley relay
Silver medal – second place	2009 Rio de Janeiro	Women's 200m freestyle S5

Cheryl Angelelli-Kornoelje is a retired American para swimmer, an Oakland University bachelor's degree's graduate and a motivational speaker. She was inducted into the Michigan Athletes with Disabilities Hall of Fame in 2000, and was named Female Amateur Athlete of the Year by the State of Michigan twice, once in 2000 and once in 2003.

== Biography ==
When Angelelli was a teenager, she sustained a spinal cord injury after breaking her neck from hitting her head on the bottom of the pool after diving off a starting block in 1983. She was practicing her start off the swimming block. She took up para swimming in 1998 in Detroit. She created a documentary film titled Untold Dreams to raise the awareness of the many abilities of disabled people and knowledge of the Paralympics as well as talking about her success in competitive swimming.

Angelelli retired from swimming in 2013 and switched to wheelchair ballroom dancing.

Angelelli was a 1993 Oakland University graduate with a communications major. Oakland University had a highly competitive women's swim team at the time, winning a number of NCAA Division II national championships, though paralympic competition was not offered. As of 2025, she remains one of the only Oakland University graduate women to compete and medal in swimming in the Olympics. The women's swim teach coach while she attended the university was Tracy Huth.
