= Anne Cécile Lequien =

French Paralympic swimmer

Anne Lequien
Personal information
- Full name: Anne Cécile Lequien
- Born: 24 December 1977 (age 48) Clamart, France

Sport
- Country: France
- Sport: Para swimming
- Disability: Meningitis survivor
- Disability class: S4
Medal record
Women's para swimming
Representing France
Paralympic Games
Gold medal – first place	2000 Sydney	4x50m medley relay 20pts
Silver medal – second place	1992 Barcelona	4x50m medley relay S1-6
Silver medal – second place	2000 Sydney	50m backstroke S4
Bronze medal – third place	1992 Barcelona	50m backstroke S5
Bronze medal – third place	1992 Barcelona	4x50m freestyle relay S1-6
Bronze medal – third place	2004 Athens	50m backstroke S4
Bronze medal – third place	2004 Athens	50m butterfly S4
World Championships
Silver medal – second place	2002 Mar del Plata	50m backstroke S4
Bronze medal – third place	2002 Mar del Plata	50m butterfly S4

Anne Cécile Lequien (born 24 December 1977) is a former French Paralympic swimmer. She had her forearms and her right leg amputated after suffering from meningitis when she was two years old.
