= Nely Miranda =

Mexican swimmer and politician (born 1972)

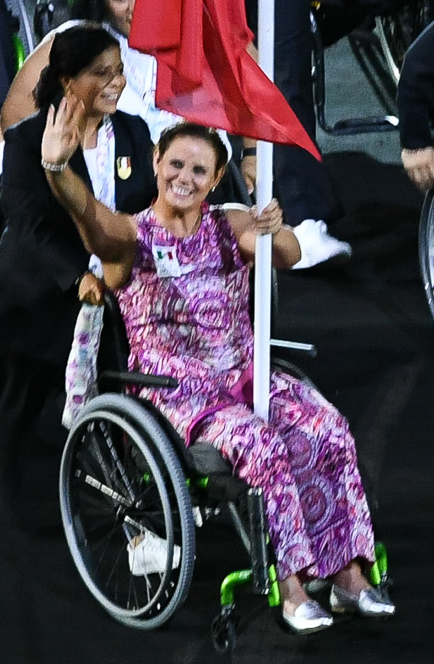
- Miranda as the Mexican flag bearer at the 2016 Summer Paralympics Parade of Nations

Personal information
- Full name: Nely Edith Miranda Herrera
- Born: 2 August 1972 (age 53) Puebla, Puebla, Mexico

Sport
- Sport: Swimming
- Strokes: Freestyle
Medal record
Women's para swimming
Representing Mexico
Paralympic Games
Gold medal – first place	2008 Beijing	50m freestyle S4
Gold medal – first place	2008 Beijing	100m freestyle S4
Bronze medal – third place	2016 Rio de Janeiro	50m freestyle S4
Bronze medal – third place	2020 Tokyo	50m breaststroke SB3
World Championships
Gold medal – first place	2010 Eindhoven	50m freestyle S4
Gold medal – first place	2010 Eindhoven	100m freestyle S4
Gold medal – first place	2010 Eindhoven	200m freestyle S4
Gold medal – first place	2015 Glasgow	50m freestyle S4
Gold medal – first place	2015 Glasgow	150m medley SM4
Silver medal – second place	2006 Durban	4x50m freestyle relay
Silver medal – second place	2015 Glasgow	50 m breaststroke SB3
Silver medal – second place	2017 Mexico City	50m freestyle S4
Bronze medal – third place	2006 Durban	4x50m medley relay
Bronze medal – third place	2010 Eindhoven	4x50m freestyle relay
Parapan American Games
Gold medal – first place	2015 Toronto	50m freestyle S4
Gold medal – first place	2015 Toronto	100m freestyle S4
Gold medal – first place	2015 Toronto	200m freestyle S4
Gold medal – first place	2015 Toronto	150m medley SM4
Gold medal – first place	2023 Santiago	50m backstroke S4
Gold medal – first place	2023 Santiago	150m medley SM4
Silver medal – second place	2007 Rio de Janeiro	200m freestyle S5
Silver medal – second place	2015 Toronto	50m backstroke S4
Silver medal – second place	2015 Toronto	50m breaststroke SB3
Silver medal – second place	2023 Santiago	50m breaststroke SB3
Bronze medal – third place	2011 Guadalajara	50m freestyle S5
Bronze medal – third place	2011 Guadalajara	100m freestyle S5
Bronze medal – third place	2011 Guadalajara	200m freestyle S5
Bronze medal – third place	2023 Santiago	50m freestyle S4

Nely Edith Miranda Herrera (Note: In this Spanish name, the first or paternal surname is Miranda and the second or maternal family name is Herrera.) (born 2 August 1972) is a Mexican paralympic swimmer and a politician from the Institutional Revolutionary Party (PRI). She served as a member of the Chamber of Deputies from 2010 to 2012, representing Veracruz's 12th congressional district.

== Career ==
She competed at the 2008 and 2016 Paralympics and won two gold and one bronze medals. The bronze medal was won in the 50 meters freestyle S4, which she entered as World Record holder from two months earlier but failed to win gold.

== Notes ==
Paralympics
Preceded by Arly Velásquez	Flagbearer for Mexico; Rio 2016	Succeeded by Arly Velásquez
