= Zsanett Adámi =

Hungarian Paralympic swimmer

Personal information
- Born: 20 December 1994 (age 31)

Sport
- Sport: Paralympic swimming
- Disability class: S2
- Strokes: Backstroke, freestyle
Medal record
Representing Hungary
European Championships
Bronze medal – third place	2011 Berlin	4x50m freestyle relay
Bronze medal – third place	2024 Madeira	100m backstroke

Zsanett Adámi-Rózsa (born 20 December 1994) is a Hungarian Paralympic swimmer who competes in international swimming competitions. She is a two-time European bronze medalist, she has competed at the 2016 and 2020 Summer Paralympics.

Adámi-Rózsa is a PhD student at Corvinus University.
