= Fabiola Ramírez =

Mexican Paralympic swimmer (born 1990)

Personal information
- Full name: Fabiola Ramirez Martinez
- Born: 19 January 1990 (age 36) Aguascalientes City, Mexico

Sport
- Country: Mexico
- Sport: Para swimming
- Disability class: S2
Medal record
Para swimming
Representing Mexico
Paralympic Games
Bronze medal – third place	2020 Tokyo	100 m backstroke S2
World Championships
Bronze medal – third place	2025 Singapore	200 m freestyle S2
Parapan American Games
Silver medal – second place	2011 Guadalajara	50 m breaststroke SB2

Fabiola Ramirez Martinez (born 19 January 1990) is a Mexican para swimmer.

== Career ==
She represented Mexico at the 2020 Summer Paralympics and won a bronze medal in the 100 metre backstroke S2 event. She served as the flag bearer for Mexico at the 2024 Summer Paralympics along with Salvador Hernández.

Paralympics
Preceded by Arly Velásquez	Flagbearer for Mexico (with Salvador Hernández); Paris 2024	Succeeded by Arly Velásquez
