= Mariia Lafina =

Ukrainian Paralympic swimmer (born 1993)

Personal information
- Born: 7 May 1993 (age 33)

Sport
- Country: Ukraine
- Sport: Paralympic swimming
Medal record
Women's para swimming
Representing Ukraine
Paralympic Games
| Silver medal – second place | 2016 Rio de Janeiro | 50 m breaststroke SB3 |
IPC World Championships
| Silver medal – second place | 2015 Glasgow | 150 m medley SM4 |

Mariia Lafina (born 7 May 1993) is a Ukrainian Paralympic swimmer. She represented Ukraine at the 2016 Summer Paralympics in Rio de Janeiro, Brazil and she won the silver medal in the women's 50 metre breaststroke SB3.

At the 2014 European Championships she won two gold medals and three bronze medals.

At the 2015 World Championships she won the silver medal in the women's 150 metre individual medley event.

At the 2016 European Championships she won one gold medal, four silver medals and one bronze medal.
