= Rildene Firmino =

Brazilian Paralympic swimmer

Personal information
- Born: 1974 (age 51–52) Natal, Rio Grande do Norte, Brazil
- Height: 1.55 m (5 ft 1 in)
- Weight: 52 kg (115 lb)

Sport
- Country: Brazil
- Sport: Paralympic swimming
- Disability: Paraplegia
- Disability class: S5, SB3, SM4
Medal record
Paralympic swimming
Representing Brazil
World Championships
Bronze medal – third place	2002 Mar del Plata	4x50m medley relay 20pts
Bronze medal – third place	2010 Eindhoven	150m individual medley
Parapan American Games
Gold medal – first place	2003 Mar del Plata	50m backstroke S5
Gold medal – first place	2003 Mar del Plata	150m individual medley SM4
Silver medal – second place	2003 Mar del Plata	50m breaststroke SB3
Silver medal – second place	2007 Rio de Janeiro	150m individual medley SM4
Silver medal – second place	2007 Rio de Janeiro	50m breaststroke SB3
Bronze medal – third place	2007 Rio de Janeiro	50m backstroke S5
Bronze medal – third place	2015 Toronto	50m breaststroke SB3
Bronze medal – third place	2015 Toronto	150m individual medley SM4

Rildene Fonseca Firmino (born 1974) is a retired Brazilian Paralympic swimmer who competed at international elite competitions, she is a double Parapan American Games champion and a two-time World bronze medalist.

== Disability ==
Firmino and her cousin Ivanildo Fonseca, both aged six at the time, were involved in a shooting incident. Fonseca got a hold of Firmino's grandfather's .38 caliber revolver and was play shooting the gun with Firmino, the gun had a single bullet in the drum and Firmino was shot in the T11 vertebra and it exited her right lung. Her injuries were so severe that she had near-fatal lung and liver complications and spent three days recovering in an intensive care unit at a nearby hospital. She was left with life-changing injuries and was paraplegic for the rest of her life.
