= Karen Breumsø =

Danish Paralympic swimmer

Personal information
- Born: 13 June 1979 (age 47) Esbjerg, Denmark

Sport
- Sport: Paralympic swimming
- Disability class: S4
Medal record
Representing Denmark
World Championships
Silver medal – second place	1994 Malta	50m freestyle S4
Paralympic Games
Silver medal – second place	2004 Athens	100m freestyle S4
Silver medal – second place	2004 Athens	200m freestyle S4
Bronze medal – third place	1996 Atlanta	50m freestyle S4
Bronze medal – third place	1996 Atlanta	50m backstroke S4
Bronze medal – third place	2000 Sydney	50m freestyle S4
Bronze medal – third place	2000 Sydney	100m freestyle S4
Bronze medal – third place	2000 Sydney	200m freestyle S4
Bronze medal – third place	2004 Athens	50m freestyle S4

Karen Breumsø (born 13 June 1979) is a Danish retired Paralympic swimmer who competed at international swimming competitions. She is an eight-time Paralympic medalist and has competed at the 1996, 2000 and 2004 Summer Paralympics.

Breumsø was born without lower legs, half a left hand and no right forearm.
