= Edênia Garcia =

Brazilian Paralympic swimmer

Personal information
- Nickname: De
- Born: 30 April 1987 (age 39) Crato, Brazil
- Height: 1.64 m (5 ft 5 in)
- Weight: 67 kg (148 lb)

Sport
- Country: Brazil
- Sport: Paralympic swimming
- Disability: Charcot-Marie-Tooth disease
- Disability class: S3
- Event(s): Freestyle swimming Backstroke
- Club: Associacao Paralimpica de Campinas
- Coached by: Fabiano Quirino da Silva
Medal record
Paralympic swimming
Representing Brazil
Paralympic Games
Silver medal – second place	2004 Athens	50m backstroke S4
Silver medal – second place	2012 London	50m backstroke S4
Bronze medal – third place	2008 Beijing	50m freestyle S4
World Championships (LC)
Gold medal – first place	2002 Mar del Plata	50m backstroke S4
Gold medal – first place	2006 Durban	50m freestyle S4
Gold medal – first place	2006 Durban	50m backstroke S4
Gold medal – first place	2010 Eindhoven	50m backstroke S4
Gold medal – first place	2019 London	50m backstroke S3
Silver medal – second place	2002 Mar del Plata	50m freestyle S4
Silver medal – second place	2002 Mar del Plata	100m freestyle S4
Silver medal – second place	2002 Mar del Plata	200m freestyle S4
Silver medal – second place	2006 Durban	100m freestyle S4
Silver medal – second place	2006 Durban	200m freestyle S4
Silver medal – second place	2010 Eindhoven	Women's 4x50m freestyle relay 20pts
Silver medal – second place	2013 Montreal	50m backstroke S4
Silver medal – second place	2017 Mexico City	50m backstroke S3
Bronze medal – third place	2002 Mar del Plata	Women's 4x50m medley relay 20pts
Bronze medal – third place	2006 Durban	Women's 4x50m freestyle relay 20pts
Bronze medal – third place	2010 Eindhoven	50m freestyle S4
Bronze medal – third place	2015 Glasgow	50m backstroke S4
Bronze medal – third place	2019 London	100m freestyle S3
World Championships (SC)
Gold medal – first place	2009 Rio de Janeiro	50m backstroke S4
Parapan American Games
Gold medal – first place	2003 Mar del Plata	50m freestyle S4
Gold medal – first place	2003 Mar del Plata	100m freestyle S4
Gold medal – first place	2003 Mar del Plata	200m freestyle S4
Gold medal – first place	2003 Mar del Plata	50m backstroke S4
Gold medal – first place	2011 Guadalajara	50m backstroke S5
Gold medal – first place	2015 Toronto	50m backstroke S4
Gold medal – first place	2019 Lima	50m backstroke S3

Edênia Nogueira Garcia (born 30 April 1987) is a Brazilian Paralympic swimmer who competes in international level events. She specializes in the backstroke and has won multiple World and Parapan titles including three Paralympic medals.

At the 2019 Parapan American Games, Garcia revealed that she was a lesbian during an interview.
