= Annke Conradi =

German Paralympic swimmer

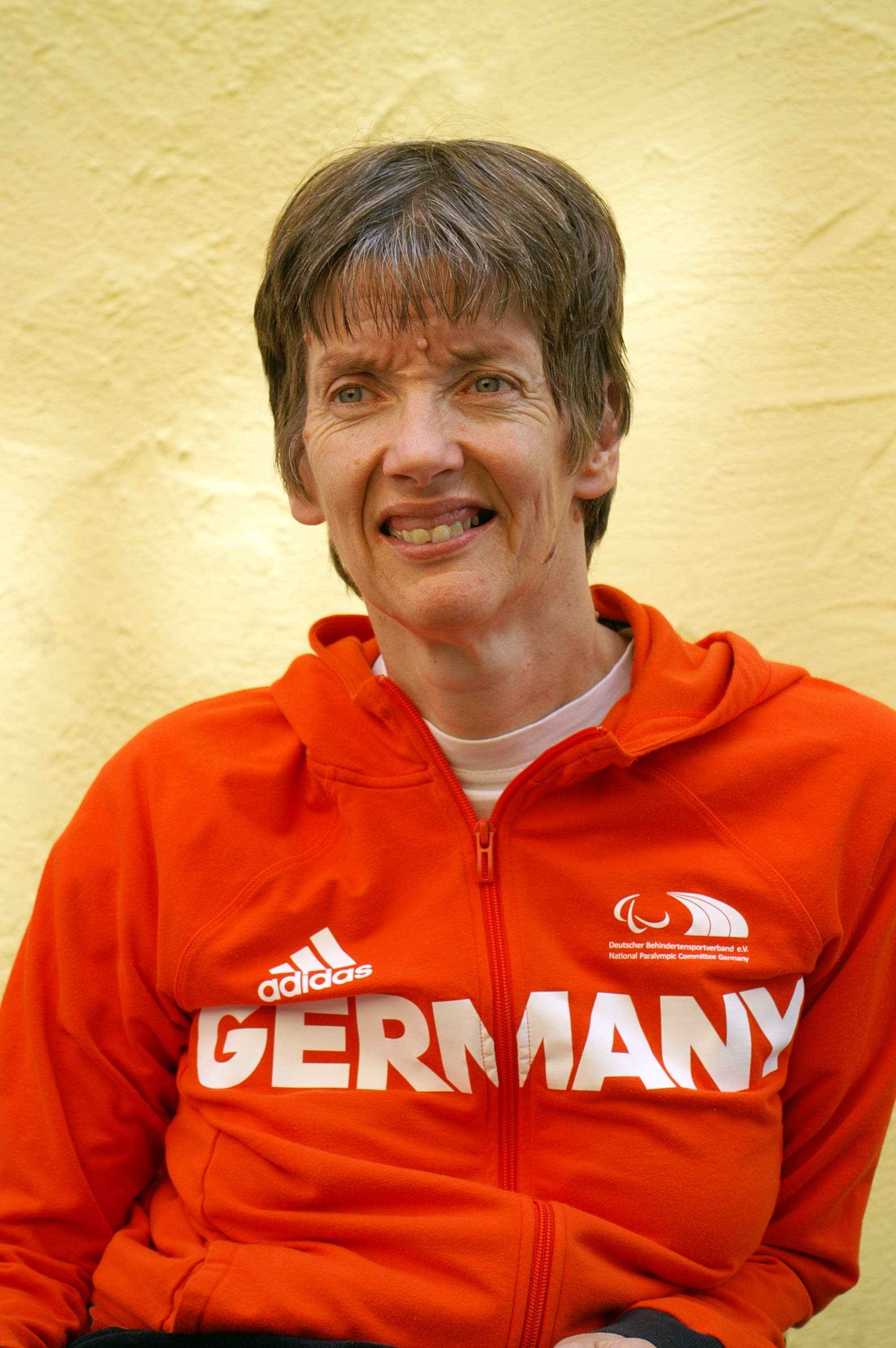

Personal information
- Born: 30 August 1965 (age 60)
- Home town: Regensburg, West Germany

Sport
- Country: Germany
- Sport: Paralympic swimming
- Disability: Cerebral palsy
- Disability class: S3
- Club: SC Regensburg
- Coached by: Heike Oehlert; Ute Schinkitz
Medal record
Paralympic swimming
Representing Germany
Paralympic Games
Gold medal – first place	2000 Sydney	Women's 50m backstroke S3
Gold medal – first place	2004 Athens	Women's 50m backstroke S3
Silver medal – second place	1996 Atlanta	Women's 100m freestyle S3
Silver medal – second place	2000 Sydney	Women's 50m backstroke S3
Silver medal – second place	2000 Sydney	Women's 50m freestyle S3
Silver medal – second place	2000 Sydney	Women's 100m freestyle S3
Silver medal – second place	2004 Athens	Women's 100m freestyle S3
Bronze medal – third place	1996 Atlanta	Women's 50m backstroke S3
Bronze medal – third place	1996 Atlanta	Women's 50m freestyle S3
Bronze medal – third place	2004 Athens	Women's 50m freestyle S3
World Championships
Gold medal – first place	1998 Christchurch	Women's 50m backstroke S3
Gold medal – first place	2002 Mar del Plata	Women's 50m backstroke S3
Silver medal – second place	1998 Christchurch	Women's 50m freestyle S3
Silver medal – second place	1998 Christchurch	Women's 100m freestyle S3
Silver medal – second place	2002 Mar del Plata	Women's 100m freestyle S3
Silver medal – second place	2002 Mar del Plata	Women's 200m freestyle S3
Silver medal – second place	2010 Eindhoven	Women's 100m freestyle S3
Silver medal – second place	2010 Eindhoven	Women's 200m freestyle S3
Bronze medal – third place	2002 Mar del Plata	Women's 50m freestyle S3
Bronze medal – third place	2006 Durban	Women's 50m backstroke S3
Bronze medal – third place	2006 Durban	Women's 100m freestyle S3
Bronze medal – third place	2006 Durban	Women's 200m freestyle S3
Bronze medal – third place	2010 Eindhoven	Women's 50m backstroke S3
Bronze medal – third place	2010 Eindhoven	Women's 50m freestyle S3

Annke Conradi (born 30 August 1965) is a German Paralympic swimmer who specialises in backstroke and freestyle and is a double world and Paralympic champion.
