= Aimee Bruder =

American Paralympic swimmer (born 1974)

Personal information
- Nationality: United States
- Born: August 3, 1974 (age 51) Cincinnati, Ohio, U.S.
- Height: 4 ft 9 in (145 cm)
- Weight: 110 lb (50 kg)

Sport
- Sport: Swimming
- Strokes: Freestyle, medley
Medal record
Women's swimming
Representing the United States
Paralympic Games
Silver medal – second place	2000 Sydney	4×50m freestyle
Bronze medal – third place	1996 Atlanta	4×50m freestyle S1–6
Bronze medal – third place	1996 Atlanta	100m freestyle S4
Bronze medal – third place	1996 Atlanta	200m freestyle S4
Bronze medal – third place	2008 Beijing	200m freestyle S4
IPC Swimming World Championships
Gold medal – first place	1998 Christchurch	4×50m freestyle relay
Gold medal – first place	1998 Christchurch	100m freestyle
Silver medal – second place	1998 Christchurch	50m freestyle
Silver medal – second place	1998 Christchurch	150m individual medley
Silver medal – second place	1998 Christchurch	200m freestyle
Silver medal – second place	2002 Mar del Plata	4×50m freestyle relay
Silver medal – second place	2002 Mar del Plata	4×50m medley relay
Silver medal – second place	2006 Durban	150m individual medley
Bronze medal – third place	1998 Christchurch	50m backstroke
Bronze medal – third place	2006 Durban	50m freestyle
Bronze medal – third place	2006 Durban	100m freestyle
Bronze medal – third place	2006 Durban	200m freestyle

Aimee Bruder (born August 3, 1974, in Cincinnati, Ohio) is an American Paralympic swimmer.

She won three bronze medals at 1996 Summer Paralympics for 100 m, 200 m and 4x50 freestyle swimming. Four years later she won a silver medal in the Sydney Paralympic Games for 4x50 freestyle and eight years later she was awarded another bronze medal at the 2008 Summer Paralympics in Beijing, China for another 100 metre freestyle swim. In March 2002 she received two silver medals for 4x50 freestyle and medley swimming at the IPC Swimming World Championships in Mar del Plata.
