= Karolina Hamer =

Polish Paralympic swimmer

Personal information
- Born: 12 February 1981 (age 45) Tychy, Poland
- Education: College of Humanities, Wrocław, Poland

Sport
- Country: Poland
- Sport: Paralympic swimming
- Disability: Paraparesis
- Disability class: S4, SB4, SM4
- Club: START Katowice
- Coached by: Ninomyslaw Jakubczyk; Wojciech Seidel
Medal record
Paralympic swimming
Representing Poland
World Championships (LC)
Silver medal – second place	2010 Eindhoven	Women's 50m backstroke S4
Silver medal – second place	2010 Eindhoven	Women's 150m individual medley SM4
Bronze medal – third place	2002 Mar del Plata	Women's 150m individual medley SM4
Bronze medal – third place	2013 Montreal	Women's 150m individual medley SM4
World Championships (SC)
Silver medal – second place	2009 Rio de Janeiro	Women's 50m backstroke S4
Bronze medal – third place	2009 Rio de Janeiro	Women's 50m freestyle S4
Bronze medal – third place	2009 Rio de Janeiro	Women's 100m freestyle S4
Bronze medal – third place	2009 Rio de Janeiro	Women's 200m freestyle S5

Karolina Hamer (born 12 February 1981) is a Polish Paralympic swimmer who competes in international level events. She is also a disability rights activist.

== Personal life ==
In 2018, she publicly came out as bisexual becoming the first active Polish sportswoman to do so.
