= Patricia Valle =

Mexican Paralympic swimmer

Personal information
- Full name: Patricia Valle Benítez
- Nickname: Paty
- Born: 7 February 1979 (age 47) Cuernavaca, Mexico
- Education: Anahuac University, Querétaro
- Height: 145 cm (4 ft 9 in)

Sport
- Country: Mexico
- Sport: Paralympic swimming
- Disability: Polio
- Disability class: S3
- Club: Mexican National Paralympic Training Centre, Mexico City
- Coached by: Fernando Gutierrez Velez
Medal record
Paralympic swimming
Representing Mexico
Paralympic Games
Gold medal – first place	2000 Sydney	100m freestyle S3
Gold medal – first place	2004 Athens	50m freestyle S3
Gold medal – first place	2004 Athens	100m freestyle S3
Gold medal – first place	2008 Beijing	50m freestyle S3
Silver medal – second place	2004 Athens	50m butterfly
Bronze medal – third place	2000 Sydney	50m freestyle S3
Bronze medal – third place	2000 Sydney	50m breaststroke SB3
Bronze medal – third place	2008 Beijing	150m individual medley SM4
Bronze medal – third place	2012 London	50m freestyle S3
Bronze medal – third place	2012 London	100m freestyle S3
Bronze medal – third place	2016 Rio de Janeiro	50m breaststroke SB3
World Championships
Gold medal – first place	1998 Christchurch	50m freestyle S3
Gold medal – first place	1998 Christchurch	50m butterfly S3
Gold medal – first place	1998 Christchurch	100m freestyle S3
Gold medal – first place	1998 Christchurch	200m freestyle S3
Gold medal – first place	2002 Mar del Plata	50m freestyle S3
Gold medal – first place	2002 Mar del Plata	50m butterfly S3
Gold medal – first place	2002 Mar del Plata	100m freestyle S3
Gold medal – first place	2002 Mar del Plata	200m freestyle S3
Gold medal – first place	2002 Mar del Plata	150m individual medley SM3
Gold medal – first place	2006 Durban	50m butterfly S3
Gold medal – first place	2006 Durban	200m freestyle S3
Gold medal – first place	2006 Durban	150m individual medley SM3
Gold medal – first place	2010 Eindhoven	50m butterfly S3
Gold medal – first place	2010 Eindhoven	100m freestyle S3
Gold medal – first place	2010 Eindhoven	200m freestyle S3
Gold medal – first place	2013 Montreal	50m butterfly S3
Silver medal – second place	1998 Christchurch	50m breaststroke SB3
Silver medal – second place	1998 Christchurch	150m individual medley SM3
Silver medal – second place	2006 Durban	100m freestyle S3
Silver medal – second place	2010 Eindhoven	50m breaststroke SB3
Silver medal – second place	2010 Eindhoven	150m individual medley SM3
Silver medal – second place	2013 Montreal	200m freestyle S3
Silver medal – second place	2019 London	100m freestyle S3
Bronze medal – third place	2002 Mar del Plata	50m breaststroke SB3
Bronze medal – third place	2006 Durban	50m freestyle S3
Bronze medal – third place	2006 Durban	50m breaststroke SB3
Bronze medal – third place	2010 Eindhoven	4x50m freestyle relay
Bronze medal – third place	2013 Montreal	150m individual medley SM3
Bronze medal – third place	2015 Glasgow	50m breaststroke SB3
Bronze medal – third place	2017 Mexico City	50m freestyle S3
Bronze medal – third place	2017 Mexico City	50m breaststroke SB3
Bronze medal – third place	2017 Mexico City	Mixed 4x50m freestyle relay
Bronze medal – third place	2019 London	50m breaststroke SB3
Bronze medal – third place	2022 Madeira	50m freestyle S3
Bronze medal – third place	2022 Madeira	100m freestyle S3
Bronze medal – third place	2025 Singapore	200m freestyle S3
Parapan American Games
Gold medal – first place	2011 Guadalajara	50m freestyle S3
Gold medal – first place	2011 Guadalajara	100m freestyle S3
Gold medal – first place	2015 Toronto	50m breaststroke SB3
Gold medal – first place	2019 Lima	50m breaststroke SB3
Silver medal – second place	2015 Toronto	150m individual medley SM4
Bronze medal – third place	2015 Toronto	50m freestyle S4

Patricia Valle Benítez (born 7 February 1979) is a Mexican Paralympic swimmer and councillor of Corregidora Municipality. She is a multiple medalist in both Summer Paralympics, World Para Swimming Championships and Parapan American Games.

Paralympics
Preceded by Armando Ruiz	Flagbearer for Mexico; London 2012	Succeeded by Arly Velásquez
