= Swimming at the 2000 Summer Paralympics – Men's 200 metre individual medley SM8 =

Men's 200m individual medley SM8 at the XI Paralympic Games
- Paralympic Swimming

Medalists
1st place, gold medalist(s)		Tian Hengheng	China
2nd place, silver medalist(s)		Ben Austin	Australia
3rd place, bronze medalist(s)		Holger Kimmig	Germany

The men's 200m individual medley SM8 event took place on 20 October 2000 in Sydney, Australia.

== Results ==
=== Heat 1 ===
Rank	Athlete	Time	Notes
1	Ben Austin (AUS)	2:48.36	Q
2	Christoph Burkard (GER)	2:49.05	Q
3	Giles Long (GBR)	2:49.78	Q
4	Travis Mohr (USA)	2:53.20	Q
5	Karl Mayr (AUT)	3:09.57	
6	Ali Uzun (TUR)	3:18.69	
	Mihovil Spanja (CRO)		DQ
	Stefan Larsson (SWE)		DQ

=== Heat 2 ===
Rank	Athlete	Time	Notes
1	Tian Hengheng (CHN)	2:43.29	Q
2	Martin Jacobsen (DEN)	2:43.71	Q
3	Holger Kimmig (GER)	2:46.48	Q
4	Emil Broendum (DEN)	2:48.67	Q
5	David Malone (IRL)	2:55.60	
6	Moises Galindo (MEX)	2:57.56	
7	Tero Huttunen (FIN)	3:02.12	
	Geert Jaehrig (GER)		DNS

=== Final ===
Rank	Athlete	Time	Notes
1st place, gold medalist(s)	Tian Hengheng (CHN)	2:38.11	WR
2nd place, silver medalist(s)	Ben Austin (AUS)	2:39.70	
3rd place, bronze medalist(s)	Holger Kimmig (GER)	2:40.15	
4	Giles Long (GBR)	2:41.96	
5	Martin Jacobsen (DEN)	2:43.38	
6	Emil Broendum (DEN)	2:47.64	
7	Travis Mohr (USA)	2:48.13	
8	Christoph Burkard (GER)	2:48.26	
