= Swimming at the 2004 Summer Paralympics – Men's 100 metre freestyle S8 =

Paralympic event

Men's 100m Freestyle S8 at the XII Paralympic Games
- Paralympic Swimming
- Venue: Olympic Aquatic Centre
- Dates: 20 September 2004
- Competitors: 14 from 10 nations
- Winning time: 59.83

Medalists
| 1st place, gold medalist(s) | | Ben Austin | Australia |
| 2nd place, silver medalist(s) | | Konstantinos Fykas | Greece |
| 3rd place, bronze medalist(s) | | Ricardo Moffatti | Australia |

The Men's 100 metre freestyle S8 swimming event at the 2004 Summer Paralympics was competed on 20 September. It was won by Ben Austin, representing Australia.

== 1st round ==
| Qualified for final round |

Heat 1

20 Sept. 2004, morning session

| Rank | Athlete | Time | Notes |
|---|---|---|---|
| 1 | Ben Austin (AUS) | 1:01.44 | PR |
| 2 | Ricardo Moffatti (AUS) | 1:03.73 | |
| 3 | Christopher Kueken (GER) | 1:05.01 | |
| 4 | Tiaan du Plessis (RSA) | 1:05.73 | |
| 5 | Gert-Jan Schep (NED) | 1:06.86 | |
| 6 | Giles Long (GBR) | 1:07.32 | |
| 7 | Matteo Lenza (ITA) | 1:07.82 | |

Heat 2

20 Sept. 2004, morning session

| Rank | Athlete | Time | Notes |
|---|---|---|---|
| 1 | Konstantinos Fykas (GRE) | 1:01.74 | |
| 2 | Matt Levy (AUS) | 1:05.21 | |
| 3 | Christoph Burkard (GER) | 1:05.69 | |
| 4 | Travis Mohr (USA) | 1:05.86 | |
| 5 | Juan Francisco Jimenez (ESP) | 1:05.97 | |
| 6 | Wang Xiao Fu (CHN) | 1:06.00 | |
| 7 | Oliver Nathan (RSA) | 1:07.48 | |

== Final round ==
20 Sept. 2004, evening session

| Rank | Athlete | Time | Notes |
|---|---|---|---|
| 1st place, gold medalist(s) | Ben Austin (AUS) | 59.83 | WR |
| 2nd place, silver medalist(s) | Konstantinos Fykas (GRE) | 1:00.37 | |
| 3rd place, bronze medalist(s) | Ricardo Moffatti (AUS) | 1:03.12 | |
| 4 | Christopher Kueken (GER) | 1:03.84 | |
| 5 | Matt Levy (AUS) | 1:04.99 | |
| 6 | Christoph Burkard (GER) | 1:05.59 | |
| 7 | Travis Mohr (USA) | 1:06.09 | |
| 8 | Tiaan du Plessis (RSA) | 1:06.11 | |
