= Swimming at the 2002 Commonwealth Games – Men's EAD 50 metre freestyle =

Men's EAD 50 metre freestyle at the 2002 Commonwealth Games
- Venue: Manchester Aquatics Centre
- Dates: 3 August (semifinals, heats); 4 August (final)
- Competitors: 51 from 13 nations
- Winning time: −0.34

Medalists
gold medal	Ben Austin	Australia
silver medal	Philippe Gagnon	Canada
bronze medal	Benoit Huot	Canada

The Men's EAD 50 metre freestyle event at the 2002 Commonwealth Games was held on 1 August at the Manchester Aquatics Centre.

== Classification ==
The events were run on a multi-disability format, which included both physically disabled and visually impaired swimmers i.e. the International Paralympic Committee’s Swimming Classification S1 – S13.

- Classes S1 – S10 are allocated to swimmers with a physical disability ranging from swimmers with a severe disability (S1) to those with a minimal disability (S10).
- Classes S11 – S13 are allocated to swimmers with a visual impairment ranging from swimmers with no vision or may have light perception (S11) to those with some visual acuity (S13).

== Format ==
All classes, 1 through 13 swan together in 3 heats and a final event. Positions were determined by each athlete’s time relative to the current world record for the appropriate classification of the swimmer. This may have meant that the swimmer touching first may not have been the winner.

World records were time standardised to identify both the finalists and medal winners throughout the competition. This meant that the same ‘time marker’ was used in the heats and the final irrespective of whether the world record had been broken during the course of competition.

== Records ==
Prior to this competition, the existing world records were as follows;

Class	Name	Time	Location	Date
S1	Itzhak Mamistalov (ISR)	1:11.30	Stockholm, Sweden	31 July 2001
S2	Curtis Lovejoy (USA)	1:10.11	Sydney, Australia	27 October 2000
S3	Jamie Eurlert (PER)	49.03	Sydney, Australia	27 October 2000
S4	Richard Orive (ESP)	38.84	Sydney, Australia	27 October 2000
S5	Sebastian Rodriguez Veloso (ESP)	33.33	Spain	26 July 2002
S6	Peter Lund Andersen (DEN)	31.26	Atlanta, United States	25 August 1996
S7	David Roberts (WAL)	28.58	Sydney, Australia	28 October 2000
S8		27.93		
S9	Xiaoming Xiong (CHN)	26.36	Sydney, Australia	28 October 2000
S10	Benoit Huot (CAN)	25.04	Winnipeg, Canada	24 March 2002
S11	John Morgan (USA)	25.96	New York, United States	1 January 1987
S12	Ebert Phillipus Kleynhans (RSA)	25.79	Sydney, Australia	28 October 2000
S13	Andrey Strokin (RUS)	24.67	Sydney, Australia	28 October 2000

The following records were established during the competition:

Date	Event	Class	Name	Nationality	Time	Result	Record
1 August	Heats	S5	Chee Kin Wong	Malaysia	47.34	+13.20	GR
1 August	Heats	S6	Yusup Dewa	Malaysia	37.31	+6.05	GR
1 August	Heats	S6	Andreas Potamitis	Cyprus	35.74	+4.48	GR
1 August	Heats	S7	Alex Harris	Australia	29.50	+0.92	GR
1 August	Final	S7	David Roberts	Wales	28.71	+0.13	GR
1 August	Heats	S8	Ben Austin	Australia	27.48	−0.45	WR
1 August	Heats	S9	Aidan McGlynn	Northern Ireland	28.88	+2.52	GR
1 August	Heats	S10	Philippe Gagnon	Canada	25.41	+0.37	GR
1 August	Heats	S10	Benoit Huot	Canada	25.23	+0.19	GR
1 August	Final	S10	Philippe Gagnon	Canada	25.04	0.00	GR
1 August	Heats	S11	Ou Dona	Papua New Guinea	40.74	+14.78	GR
1 August	Heats	S12	Darren Leach	England	26.10	+0.31	GR
1 August	Final	S12	Darren Leach	England	25.91	+0.12	GR
1 August	Heats	S13	Scott Field	South Africa	26.09	+1.42	GR

== Results ==
=== Heats ===
The 8 fastest swimmers in the heats qualified for the semifinals.

Rank	Heat	Lane	Name	Class	Nationality	Time	Result	Notes
1	3	3	Ben Austin	S8	Australia	27.48	−0.45	Q, WR, GR
2	2	6	David Roberts	S7	Wales	28.75	+0.17	Q, GR
3	3	4	Benoit Huot	S10	Canada	25.23	+0.19	Q, GR
4	1	4	Darren Leach	S12	England	26.10	+0.31	Q, GR
5	2	4	Philippe Gagnon	S10	Canada	25.41	+0.37	Q, GR
6	2	5	Ebert Phillipus Kleynhans	S12	South Africa	26.35	+0.56	Q
7	1	6	Alex Harris	S7	Australia	29.50	+0.92	Q, GR
7	3	6	Matt Walker	S7	England	29.50	+0.92	Q
9	2	3	Ian Sharpe	S12	Isle of Man	27.21	+1.42	
9	3	5	Scott Field	S13	South Africa	26.09	+1.42	GR
11	1	3	Aidan McGlynn	S9	Northern Ireland	28.88	+2.52	GR
12	2	2	Andrew Lindsay	S7	Scotland	31.52	+2.94	
13	1	5	Paul Noble	S10	Scotland	28.03	+2.99	GR
14	3	2	Nick Gibbon	S10	Wales	29.34	+4.30	
15	3	7	Andreas Potamitis	S6	Cyprus	35.74	+4.48	GR
16	2	7	Meng Ee Wong	S12	Singapore	31.27	+5.48	
17	1	7	Yusup Dewa	S6	Malaysia	37.31	+6.05	GR
18	1	2	Abdulgani Ashur Abeid	S10	Kenya	36.11	+11.07	
19	1	1	Chee Kin Wong	S5	Malaysia	47.34	+13.20	GR
20	2	1	Ioannis Mavrou	S6	Cyprus	44.90	+13.64	
21	3	1	Ou Dona	S11	Papua New Guinea	40.74	+14.78	GR

=== Final ===
The final was held on 1 August at 19:37.

Rank	Lane	Name	Class	Nation	Time	Result	Notes
1st place, gold medalist(s)	4	Ben Austin	S8	Australia	27.59	−0.34	
2nd place, silver medalist(s)	2	Philippe Gagnon	S10	Canada	25.04	0.00	GR
3rd place, bronze medalist(s)	3	Benoit Huot	S10	Canada	25.07	+0.03	GR
4	6	Darren Leach	S12	England	25.91	+0.12	GR
5	5	David Roberts	S7	Wales	28.71	+0.13	GR
6	1	Alex Harris	S7	Australia	29.00	+0.42	
7	7	Ebert Phillipus Kleynhans	S12	South Africa	26.55	+0.76	
8	8	Matt Walker	S7	England	29.55	+0.97	
