= Denmark at the Paralympics =

- IPC code: DEN
- NPC: Paralympic Committee Denmark
- Website: www.paralympic.dk
- Medals: Gold 106 Silver 95 Bronze 119 Total 320

Summer appearances
- 1968; 1972; 1976; 1980; 1984; 1988; 1992; 1996; 2000; 2004; 2008; 2012; 2016; 2020; 2024

Winter appearances
- 1980; 1984; 1988; 1992; 1994; 1998; 2002; 2006; 2010; 2014; 2018; 2022; 2026

Denmark made its Paralympic Games début at the 1968 Summer Paralympics in Tel Aviv with a delegation of eight competitors, in swimming and table tennis. The country has participated in every subsequent edition of the Summer Paralympics, and in every edition of the Winter Games since 1980.

Danish athletes have won a total of 320 Paralympic medals, of which 106 are gold. All but six of these have been won at the Summer Games. Denmark won its first medals in 1976, when Jorn Nielsen notably took three gold medals in track and field. The country was most successful in the 1980s, when it recorded its greatest medal hauls at the Summer Games, and in the 1990s - the only decade during which it won medals at the Winter Paralympics.

Among Denmark's most successful athletes are Ingrid Lauridsen, who swept up six gold medals in athletics in 1984, followed by two more in 1988; Anders Christensen, winner of five gold medals in swimming in 1988; and Connie Hansen, who won a total of nine gold medals in athletics in 1988 and 1992.

Denmark's Winter Paralympics medallists are:

- Lars Nielsen: silver in the Men's Giant Slalom (B2 category) in 1992
- Anne-Mette Bredahl-Christensen: gold in the Women's 7.5 km Free Technique (B1-3) in biathlon, and bronze in two cross-country skiing events, in 1994; then gold in the Women's 5 km Free Technique (B1) in cross-country skiing and bronze in the 7.5 km Free Technique (B1) in biathlon, in 1998.

== Medal tallies ==
=== Summer Paralympics ===
Event	Gold	Silver	Bronze	Total	Ranking
1968 Summer Paralympics	0	0	0	0	-
1972 Summer Paralympics	0	0	0	0	-
1976 Summer Paralympics	3	0	3	6	24th
1980 Summer Paralympics	6	4	7	17	21st
1984 Summer Paralympics	30	13	16	59	10th
1988 Summer Paralympics	23	19	22	64	11th
1992 Summer Paralympics	12	22	12	46	11th
1996 Summer Paralympics	7	17	17	41	24th
2000 Summer Paralympics	8	8	14	30	19th
2004 Summer Paralympics	5	3	7	15	29th
2008 Summer Paralympics	3	2	4	9	35th
2012 Summer Paralympics	1	0	4	5	50th
2016 Summer Paralympics	1	2	4	7	51st
2020 Summer Paralympics	3	1	1	5	40th
2024 Summer Paralympics	2	3	5	10	38th
Total	104	92	114	304	

=== Winter Paralympics ===
Event	Gold	Silver	Bronze	Total	Ranking
1980 Winter Paralympics	0	0	0	0	-
1984 Winter Paralympics	0	0	0	0	-
1988 Winter Paralympics	0	0	0	0	-
1992 Winter Paralympics	0	1	0	1	18th
1994 Winter Paralympics	1	0	2	3	16th
1998 Winter Paralympics	1	0	1	2	16th
2002 Winter Paralympics	0	0	0	0	-
2006 Winter Paralympics	0	0	0	0	-
2010 Winter Paralympics	0	0	0	0	-
2014 Winter Paralympics	0	0	0	0	-
2018 Winter Paralympics	0	0	0	0	-
2022 Winter Paralympics	0	0	0	0	-
Total	2	1	3	6	

== Multi-medalists ==
Danish athletes who have won at least three gold medals or five or more medals of any colour.

No.	Athlete	Sport	Years	Games	Gender	Gold	Silver	Bronze	Total
1	Connie Hansen	Athletics	1984-1992	3	F	9	4	1	14
2	Ingrid Lauridsen	Athletics	1980-1992	4	F	8	5	4	17
3	John Petersson	Swimming	1984-2000	5	M	6	2	7	15
4	Anders Christensen	Swimming	1988-1992	1	M	5	0	5	10
5	Henrik Jorgensen	Athletics; Boccia	1984-1996, 2004	5	M	4	3	2	9
6	Jackie Christiansen	Athletics	2004-2012	3	M	3	2	0	5
7	Jakob Mathiasen	Athletics	1996-2004	3	M	2	2	1	5
8	Peter Rosenmeier	Table tennis	2004-2024	6	M	2	1	3	6
8	Ricka Stenger	Swimming	1996-2000	2	F	2	1	3	6

== See also ==
- Denmark at the Olympics
