= Swimming at the 2004 Summer Paralympics – Men's 200 metre individual medley SM8 =

Men's 200m Individual Medley SM8 at the XII Paralympic Games
- Paralympic Swimming
- Venue: Olympic Aquatic Centre
- Dates: 23 September 2004
- Competitors: 8 from 7 nations
- Winning time: 2:26.82

Medalists
1st place, gold medalist(s)		Wang Xiao Fu	China
2nd place, silver medalist(s)		Benoit Austin	Australia
3rd place, bronze medalist(s)		Mihovil Spanja	Croatia

The Men's 200 metre individual medley SM8 swimming event at the 2004 Summer Paralympics was competed on 23 September. It was won by Wang Xiao Fu, representing China.

== Final round ==
23 Sept. 2004, evening session

Rank	Athlete	Time	Notes
1st place, gold medalist(s)	Wang Xiao Fu (CHN)	2:26.82	WR
2nd place, silver medalist(s)	Benoit Austin (AUS)	2:32.19	
3rd place, bronze medalist(s)	Mihovil Spanja (CRO)	2:39.62	
4	Travis Mohr (USA)	2:39.79	
5	Gert-Jan Schep (NED)	2:40.90	
6	Giles Long (GBR)	2:40.98	
7	Christoph Burkard (GER)	2:42.53	
8	Christopher Kueken (GER)	2:53.40	
