= Denmark at the 1996 Summer Paralympics =

- IPC code: DEN
- NPC: Paralympic Committee Denmark
- Website: www.paralympic.dk

in Atlanta
- Competitors: 45 (25 men and 20 women)
- Medals Ranked 24th: Gold 7 Silver 17 Bronze 17 Total 41

Summer Paralympics appearances (overview)
- 1968; 1972; 1976; 1980; 1984; 1988; 1992; 1996; 2000; 2004; 2008; 2012; 2016; 2020; 2024

45 athletes (25 men and 20 women) from Denmark competed at the 1996 Summer Paralympics in Atlanta, United States.

== Medallists ==
Medal	Name	Sport	Event
Gold	Brita Andersen	Equestrian	Mixed dressage grade I
Gold	Peter Lund Andersen	Swimming	Men's 50m freestyle S6
Gold	Emil Brondum	Swimming	Men's 50m freestyle S8
Gold	Christian Bundgaard	Swimming	Men's 100m backstroke B1
Gold	Emil Brondum	Swimming	Men's 100m freestyle S8
Gold	Pernille Thomsen	Swimming	Women's 50m freestyle S8
Gold	Brian Nielsen	Table tennis	Men's singles 6
Silver	Jakob Mathiasen	Athletics	Men's javelin F42
Silver	Henrik Jorgensen	Boccia	Mixed individual C1
Silver	Charlotte Jensen	Equestrian	Mixed kur canter grade IV
Silver	Brita Andersen	Equestrian	Mixed kur trot grade I
Silver	Mixed	Equestrian	Mixed team open
Silver	Lone Overbye	Shooting	Women's air pistol SH1
Silver	Kazimierz Mechula	Shooting	Mixed air rifle prone SH1
Silver	John Petersson	Swimming	Men's 50m breaststroke SB3
Silver	Kasper Hansen	Swimming	Men's 100m backstroke S8
Silver	Ivan Nielsen	Swimming	Men's 100m breaststroke B3
Silver	Emil Brondum	Swimming	Men's 100m butterfly S8
Silver	Peter Lund Andersen	Swimming	Men's 100m freestyle S6
Silver	Christian Bundgaard	Swimming	Men's 200m breaststroke B2
Silver	Ivan Nielsen	Swimming	Men's 200m breaststroke B3
Silver	Peter Lund Andersen	Swimming	Men's 200m freestyle S6
Silver	Ivan Nielsen	Swimming	Men's 400m freestyle B3
Silver	Pernille Thomsen	Swimming	Women's 100m freestyle S8
Bronze	Jakob Mathiasen	Athletics	Men's pentathlon P42
Bronze	Britta Sorensen	Equestrian	Mixed dressage grade IV
Bronze	Britta Sorensen	Equestrian	Mixed kur canter grade IV
Bronze	John Petersson	Swimming	Men's 50m butterfly S4
Bronze	Peter Lund Andersen	Swimming	Men's 50m butterfly S6
Bronze	Ivan Nielsen	Swimming	Men's 100m butterfly B3
Bronze	John Petersson	Swimming	Men's 100m freestyle S4
Bronze	Kasper Hansen	Swimming	Men's 100m freestyle S8
Bronze	John Petersson	Swimming	Men's 150m medley SM4
Bronze	Flemming Berthelsen	Swimming	Men's 200m medley B3
Bronze	Peter Lund Andersen	Swimming	Men's 200m medley SM5
Bronze	Emil Brondum	Swimming	Men's 400m freestyle S8
Bronze	Karen Breumsoe	Swimming	Women's 50m backstroke S4
Bronze	Karen Breumsoe	Swimming	Women's 50m freestyle S4
Bronze	Ricka Stenger	Swimming	Women's 50m freestyle S9
Bronze	Ricka Stenger	Swimming	Women's 100m breaststroke SB10
Bronze	Ricka Stenger	Swimming	Women's 200m medley SM9

== See also ==
- Denmark at the Paralympics
- Denmark at the 1996 Summer Olympics
