= Swimming at the 2000 Summer Paralympics – Women's 200 metre individual medley SM9 =

Women's 200m individual medley SM9 at the XI Paralympic Games
- Paralympic Swimming
- Venue: Sydney International Aquatics Centre
- Dates: 20 October 2000

Medalists
| 1st place, gold medalist(s) | | Ricka Stenger | Denmark |
| 2nd place, silver medalist(s) | | Stephanie Dixon | Canada |
| 3rd place, bronze medalist(s) | | Katerina Coufalova | Czech Republic |

The women's 200m individual medley SM9 event took place on 20 October 2000 in Sydney, Australia.

== Results ==
=== Heat 1 ===
| Rank | Athlete | Time | Notes |
|---|---|---|---|
| 1 | Kate Bailey (AUS) | 2:50.77 | Q |
| 2 | Katerina Coufalova (CZE) | 2:50.85 | Q |
| 3 | Sisse Grynet Egeborg (DEN) | 2:53.00 | Q |
| 4 | Lara Ferguson (GBR) | 2:56.52 | Q |
| 5 | Zuzana Sustrikova (SVK) | 3:03.24 | |
| 6 | Dianna Ley (AUS) | 3:10.72 | |

=== Heat 2 ===
| Rank | Athlete | Time | Notes |
|---|---|---|---|
| 1 | Ricka Stenger (DEN) | 2:46.89 | Q |
| 2 | Casey Redford (AUS) | 2:56.87 | |
| 3 | Katarzyna Michalczyk (POL) | 2:59.33 | |
| 4 | Tatiana Outekina (RUS) | 3:00.06 | |
| 5 | Beata Drozdowska (POL) | 3:01.10 | |
| 6 | Alexandra Guarascio (CAN) | 3:02.86 | |

=== Heat 3 ===
| Rank | Athlete | Time | Notes |
|---|---|---|---|
| 1 | Stephanie Dixon (CAN) | 2:47.36 | Q |
| 2 | Sabrina Bellavia (BEL) | 2:52.58 | Q |
| 3 | Claudia Knoth (GER) | 2:54.48 | Q |
| 4 | Beate Lobenstein (GER) | 2:59.87 | |
| 5 | Darda Geiger (CAN) | 3:00.60 | |
| 6 | Leila Marques (POR) | 3:01.90 | |

=== Final ===
| Rank | Athlete | Time | Notes |
|---|---|---|---|
| 1st place, gold medalist(s) | Ricka Stenger (DEN) | 2:44.89 | WR |
| 2nd place, silver medalist(s) | Stephanie Dixon (CAN) | 2:47.59 | |
| 3rd place, bronze medalist(s) | Katerina Coufalova (CZE) | 2:47.84 | |
| 4 | Kate Bailey (AUS) | 2:48.74 | |
| 5 | Claudia Knoth (GER) | 2:50.37 | |
| 6 | Sisse Grynet Egeborg (DEN) | 2:52.79 | |
| 7 | Sabrina Bellavia (BEL) | 2:53.69 | |
| 8 | Lara Ferguson (GBR) | 2:55.37 | |
