= Swimming at the 2000 Summer Paralympics – Men's 150 metre individual medley SM4 =

Men's 150m individual medley SM4 at the XI Paralympic Games
- Paralympic Swimming
- Venue: Sydney International Aquatics Centre
- Dates: 20 October 2000

Medalists
1st place, gold medalist(s)		Javier Torres	Spain
2nd place, silver medalist(s)		Krzysztof Sleczka	Poland
3rd place, bronze medalist(s)		John Petersson	Denmark

The men's 150 metre individual medley event took place on 20 October 2000 in Sydney, Australia.

== Results ==
=== Heat 1 ===
Rank	Athlete	Time	Notes
1	Javier Torres (ESP)	2:43.63	Q
2	Zeng Huabin (CHN)	2:57.10	Q
3	Miguel Luque (ESP)	3:03.70	Q
4	Sebastian Facundo Ramirez (ARG)	3:04.18	Q
5	Thomas Rosenberger (AUT)	3:15.58	

=== Heat 2 ===
Rank	Athlete	Time	Notes
1	Krzysztof Sleczka (POL)	2:43.57	Q
2	John Petersson (DEN)	2:53.75	Q
3	Sanit Songnork (THA)	2:56.71	Q
4	Hiroshi Karube (JPN)	3:02.29	Q
5	Emilio Montiel (MEX)	3:04.67	
6	Chee Kin Wong (MAS)	3:11.90	

=== Final ===
Rank	Athlete	Time	Notes
1st place, gold medalist(s)	Javier Torres (ESP)	2:37.94	WR
2nd place, silver medalist(s)	Krzysztof Sleczka (POL)	2:40.29	
3rd place, bronze medalist(s)	John Petersson (DEN)	2:46.99	
4	Sanit Songnork (THA)	2:50.52	
5	Zeng Huabin (CHN)	2:54.66	
6	Sebastian Facundo Ramirez (ARG)	2:59.61	
7	Miguel Luque (ESP)	3:08.04	
8	Hiroshi Karube (JPN)	3:09.52	
