= Swimming at the 2002 Commonwealth Games – Men's EAD 100 metre freestyle =

Men's EAD 100 metre freestyle at the 2002 Commonwealth Games
- Venue: Manchester Aquatics Centre
- Dates: 3 August
- Competitors: 17 from 11 nations
- Winning time: -1.26

Medalists
gold medal	Ben Austin	Australia
silver medal	Scott Field	South Africa
bronze medal	David Roberts	Wales

The Men's EAD 100 metre freestyle event at the 2002 Commonwealth Games was held on 3 August at the Manchester Aquatics Centre.

== Classification ==
The events were run on a multi-disability format, which included both physically disabled and visually impaired swimmers i.e. the International Paralympic Committee’s Swimming Classification S1 – S13.

- Classes S1 – S10 are allocated to swimmers with a physical disability ranging from swimmers with a severe disability (S1) to those with a minimal disability (S10).
- Classes S11 – S13 are allocated to swimmers with a visual impairment ranging from swimmers with no vision or may have light perception (S11) to those with some visual acuity (S13).

== Format ==
All classes, 1 through 13 swan together in 3 heats and a final event. Positions were determined by each athlete’s time relative to the current world record for the appropriate classification of the swimmer. This may have meant that the swimmer touching first may not have been the winner.

World records were time standardised to identify both the finalists and medal winners throughout the competition. This meant that the same ‘time marker’ was used in the heats and the final irrespective of whether the world record had been broken during the course of competition.

== Records ==
Prior to this competition, the existing world records were as follows;

Class	Name	Time	Location	Date
S1	Itzhak Mamistalov (ISR)	2:32.70	Stockholm, Sweden	5 August 2001
S2	Curtis Lovejoy (USA)	2:10.48	Sydney, Australia	26 October 2000
S3	Kenneth Cairns (SCO)	1:54.03	Greve, Denmark	11 March 2000
S4	Richard Oribe (ESP)	1:25.92	Sydney, Australia	26 October 2000
S5	Sebastián Rodríguez (ESP)	1:17.21	Spain	27 July 2002
S6	Jianhua Yin (CHN)	1:08.10	Sydney, Australia	26 October 2000
S7		1:02.62		
S8		1:01.47		
S9	Xiaoming Xiong (CHN)	58.62	Sydney, Australia	25 October 2000
S10		53.84		
S11	John Morgan (USA)	56.67	Gothenburg, Sweden	9 August 1986
S12	John Morgan (USA)	56.22	New York City, United States	18 June 1984
S13		55.69		

The following records were established during the competition:

Date	Event	Class	Name	Nationality	Time	Result	Record
3 August	Heats	S3	Kenneth Cairns	Scotland	1:57.77	+3.74	GR
3 August	Heats	S6	Gareth Duke	Wales	1:18.08	+9.98	GR
3 August	Heats	S7	David Roberts	Wales	1:02.77	+0.15	GR
3 August	Final	S7	David Roberts	Wales	1:02.50	-0.12	WR
3 August	Heats	S8	Ben Austin	Australia	1:00.27	-1.20	WR
3 August	Final	S8	Ben Austin	Australia	1:00.21	-1.26	WR
3 August	Heats	S8	Kong Thye Kwong	Malaysia	1:26.33	+24.86	GR
3 August	Heats	S9	James Crisp	England	1:00.44	+1.82	GR
3 August	Heats	S10	Benoît Huot	Canada	55.25	+1.41	GR
3 August	Final	S10	Benoît Huot	Canada	53.76	-0.08	WR
3 August	Heats	S10	Philippe Gagnon	Canada	54.64	+0.80	GR
3 August	Heats	S11	Ou Dona	Papua New Guinea	1:36.04	+39.37	GR
3 August	Heats	S12	Darren Leach	England	58.34	+2.12	GR
3 August	Final	S12	Darren Leach	England	57.60	+1.38	GR
3 August	Heats	S13	Scott Field	South Africa	55.03	-0.66	WR

== Results ==
=== Heats ===
The 8 fastest swimmers in the heats qualified for the semifinals.

Rank	Heat	Lane	Name	Class	Nationality	Time	Result	Notes
1	3	3	Ben Austin	S8	Australia	1:00.27	-1.20	Q, WR
2	3	5	Scott Field	S13	South Africa	55.03	-0.66	Q, WR
3	1	3	David Roberts	S7	Wales	1:02.77	+0.15	Q, GR
4	3	4	Philippe Gagnon	S10	Canada	54.64	+0.80	Q, GR
5	2	4	Benoît Huot	S10	Canada	55.25	+1.41	Q, GR
6	1	5	James Crisp	S9	England	1:00.44	+1.82	Q, GR
7	1	4	Darren Leach	S12	England	58.34	+2.12	Q, GR
8	2	5	Ian Sharpe	S12	Isle of Man	59.93	+3.71	Q
9	3	1	Kenneth Cairns	S3	Scotland	1:57.77	+3.74	GR
10	2	6	Alex Harris	S7	Australia	1:06.71	+4.09	
11	1	6	Andrew Lindsay	S7	Scotland	1:09.25	+6.63	
12	1	2	Gareth Duke	S6	Wales	1:18.08	+9.98	GR
13	3	7	Yusup Dewa	S6	Malaysia	1:23.84	+15.74	
14	3	2	Meng Ee Wong	S12	Singapore	1:12.24	+16.02	
15	2	2	Abdulgani Ashur Abeid	S10	Kenya	1:18.26	+24.42	
16	2	7	Kong Thye Kwong	S8	Malaysia	1:26.33	+24.86	GR
17	1	7	Ou Dona	S11	Papua New Guinea	1:36.04	+39.37	GR

=== Final ===
The final was held on 3 August at 20:25.

Rank	Lane	Name	Class	Nation	Time	Result	Notes
1st place, gold medalist(s)	4	Ben Austin	S8	Australia	1:00.21	-1.26	WR
2nd place, silver medalist(s)	5	Scott Field	S13	South Africa	55.12	-0.57	
3rd place, bronze medalist(s)	3	David Roberts	S7	Wales	1:02.50	-0.12	WR
4	2	Benoît Huot	S10	Canada	53.76	-0.08	WR
5	6	Philippe Gagnon	S10	Canada	54.65	+0.81	
6	1	Darren Leach	S12	England	57.60	+1.38	GR
7	7	James Crisp	S9	England	1:00.88	+2.26	
8	8	Ian Sharpe	S12	Isle of Man	1:00.25	+4.03	
