= Swimming at the 2004 Summer Paralympics – Men's 100 metre butterfly S8 =

Men's 100m Butterfly S8 at the XII Paralympic Games
- Paralympic Swimming
- Venue: Olympic Aquatic Centre
- Dates: 19 September 2004
- Competitors: 13 from 8 nations
- Winning time: 1:05.20

Medalists
1st place, gold medalist(s)		Wang Xiao Fu	China
2nd place, silver medalist(s)		Benoit Austin	Australia
3rd place, bronze medalist(s)		Giles Long	Great Britain

The Men's 100 metre butterfly S8 swimming event at the 2004 Summer Paralympics was competed on 19 September. It was won by Wang Xiao Fu, representing China.

== 1st round ==
Qualified for final round

Heat 1

19 Sept. 2004, morning session

Rank	Athlete	Time	Notes
1	Giles Long (GBR)	1:07.61	PR
2	Oliver Nathan (RSA)	1:15.17	
3	Liu Jing Yan (CHN)	1:17.20	
4	Rudy Garcia (USA)	1:17.60	
5	Silvester Skuliba (SVK)	1:23.40	
	Konstantinos Fykas (GRE)	DSQ	

Heat 2

19 Sept. 2004, morning session

Rank	Athlete	Time	Notes
1	Benoit Austin (AUS)	1:05.79	WR
2	Wang Xiao Fu (CHN)	1:06.89	
3	Wang Jia Chao (CHN)	1:12.54	
4	Ricardo Moffatti (AUS)	1:13.72	
5	Justin Fleming (USA)	1:16.94	
6	Matt Levy (AUS)	1:18.32	
7	Chikara Ara (JPN)	1:19.96	

== Final round ==
19 Sept. 2004, evening session

Rank	Athlete	Time	Notes
1st place, gold medalist(s)	Wang Xiao Fu (CHN)	1:05.20	WR
2nd place, silver medalist(s)	Benoit Austin (AUS)	1:06.57	
3rd place, bronze medalist(s)	Giles Long (GBR)	1:07.12	
4	Wang Jia Chao (CHN)	1:11.29	
5	Ricardo Moffatti (AUS)	1:13.72	
6	Oliver Nathan (RSA)	1:14.57	
7	Justin Fleming (USA)	1:18.21	
8	Liu Jing Yan (CHN)	1:18.85	
