= Swimming at the 2006 Commonwealth Games – Men's 100 metre EAD freestyle =

== Men's 100 m EAD Freestyle - Final ==
Pos.	Lane	Athlete	R.T.	50 m	100 m	Tbh.
	4	(Australia) Matthew John Cowdrey (AUS)	0.71	27.44; 27.44	56.73 (WR/AR/NR); 29.29	3.51
	3	(Canada) Benoît Huot (CAN)	0.81	25.53; 25.53	53.22 (WR); 27.69	
	6	(Wales) David Roberts (WAL)	1.06	29.93; 29.93	1:01.85; 31.92	8.63
4	5	(Australia) Benjamin James Austin (AUS)	0.74	28.80; 28.80	1:00.50; 31.70	7.28
5	7	(England) Matthew Benedict Walker (ENG)	0.90	30.35; 30.35	1:03.71; 33.36	10.49
6	2	(Australia) Sam Julian Bramham (AUS)	0.86	28.89; 28.89	1:00.15; 31.26	6.93
7	1	(New Zealand) Daniel Robert Sharp (NZL)	0.73	27.12; 27.12	58.42; 31.30	5.20
8	8	(Canada) Donovan Tildesley (CAN)	0.78	29.12; 29.12	1:01.51; 32.39	8.29

== Men's 100 m EAD Freestyle - Heats ==
=== Men's 100 m EAD Freestyle - Heat 01 ===
Pos.	Lane	Athlete	R.T.	50 m	100 m	Tbh.
1	5	(Australia) Sam Julian Bramham (AUS)	0.86	28.84; 28.84	1:00.17; 31.33	1.85
2	3	(England) Matthew Benedict Walker (ENG)	0.95	30.07; 30.07	1:05.33; 35.26	7.01
3	4	(New Zealand) Daniel Robert Sharp (NZL)	0.89	27.50; 27.50	58.32; 30.82	
4	2	(India) Tirumalai Kumar Subbaiah (IND)	1.01	37.76; 37.76	1:22.49; 44.73	24.17
5	7	(India) Prem Kumar (IND)	1.01	40.63; 40.63	1:27.07; 46.44	28.75
DSQ	6	(Malaysia) Jaranding Stanley Anak (MAS)		30.90; 30.90	DSQ	

=== Men's 100 m EAD Freestyle - Heat 02 ===
Pos.	Lane	Athlete	R.T.	50 m	100 m	Tbh.
1	3	(Wales) David Roberts (WAL)	0.96	30.63; 30.63	1:03.62; 32.99	4.04
2	5	(Canada) Donovan Tildesley (CAN)	0.75	28.87; 28.87	1:00.59; 31.72	1.01
3	4	(Canada) Brian Hill (CAN)	0.85	28.09; 28.09	59.58; 31.49	
4	7	(Cyprus) Andreas Potamitis (CYP)	0.85	37.54; 37.54	1:19.82; 42.28	20.24
5	2	(Singapore) Chen Hai Leow (SIN)	0.94	33.82; 33.82	1:11.80; 37.98	12.22
6	6	(Malaysia) Tambi Razak Binti (MAS)	0.95	33.02; 33.02	1:10.22; 37.20	10.64

=== Men's 100 m EAD Freestyle - Heat 03 ===
Pos.	Lane	Athlete	R.T.	50 m	100 m	Tbh.
1	5	(Australia) Matthew John Cowdrey (AUS)	0.74	27.73; 27.73	57.97; 30.24	3.55
2	3	(Australia) Benjamin James Austin (AUS)	0.75	28.75; 28.75	1:00.21; 31.46	5.79
3	4	(Canada) Benoît Huot (CAN)	0.87	26.86; 26.86	54.42; 27.56	
4	1	(Northern Ireland) Jonathan Cummings (NIR)	0.00	37.56; 37.56	1:18.99; 41.43	24.57
5	2	(Singapore) Keng Joo Lim (SIN)	0.86	33.51; 33.51	1:11.39; 37.88	16.97
6	6	(Malaysia) Dawan Fraidden (MAS)	0.95	32.12; 32.12	1:08.59; 36.47	14.17
7	7	(Singapore) Teck Hua Lieu (SIN)	0.76	36.21; 36.21	1:17.03; 40.82	22.61
