= Swimming at the 2004 Summer Paralympics – Men's 50 metre freestyle S8 =

Men's 50m Freestyle S8 at the XII Paralympic Games
- Paralympic Swimming
- Venue: Olympic Aquatic Centre
- Dates: 26 September 2004
- Competitors: 9 from 7 nations
- Winning time: 26.84

Medalists
1st place, gold medalist(s)		Wang Xiao Fu	China
2nd place, silver medalist(s)		Konstantinos Fykas	Greece
3rd place, bronze medalist(s)		Benoit Austin	Australia

The Men's 50 metre freestyle S8 swimming event at the 2004 Summer Paralympics was competed on 26 September. It was won by Wang Xiao Fu, representing China.

== 1st round ==
Qualified for final round

Heat 1

26 Sept. 2004, morning session

Rank	Athlete	Time	Notes
1	Benoit Austin (AUS)	28.23	
2	Matt Levy (AUS)	29.98	
3	Gert-Jan Schep (NED)	30.32	
4	Tiaan du Plessis (RSA)	30.76	

Heat 2

26 Sept. 2004, morning session

Rank	Athlete	Time	Notes
1	Wang Xiao Fu (CHN)	27.33	WR
2	Konstantinos Fykas (GRE)	27.97	
3	Ricardo Moffatti (AUS)	29.60	
4	Christopher Kueken (GER)	30.38	
5	Matteo Lenza (ITA)	31.67	

== Final round ==
26 Sept. 2004, evening session

Rank	Athlete	Time	Notes
1st place, gold medalist(s)	Wang Xiao Fu (CHN)	26.84	WR
2nd place, silver medalist(s)	Konstantinos Fykas (GRE)	27.54	
3rd place, bronze medalist(s)	Benoit Austin (AUS)	28.42	
4	Ricardo Moffatti (AUS)	29.42	
5	Matt Levy (AUS)	30.14	
5	Gert-Jan Schep (NED)	30.14	
7	Christopher Kueken (GER)	30.24	
8	Tiaan du Plessis (RSA)	30.26	
