= Swimming at the 2006 Commonwealth Games – Men's 50 metre EAD freestyle =

== Men's 50m EAD Freestyle - Final ==
Pos.	Lane	Athlete	R.T.	50m	Tbh.
	4	(Australia) Matthew John Cowdrey (AUS)	0.72	26.06 (WR)	1.22
	5	(Canada) Benoît Huot (CAN)	0.82	24.84	
	3	(England) Matthew Benedict Walker (ENG)	0.96	28.94	4.10
4	6	(Wales) David Roberts (WAL)	0.95	28.97	4.13
5	2	(New Zealand) Daniel Robert Sharp (NZL)	0.83	25.81	0.97
6	7	(Australia) Benjamin James Austin (AUS)	0.77	28.03	3.19
7	8	(Canada) Donovan Tildesley (CAN)	0.81	27.74	2.90
8	1	(Australia) Alex James Harris (AUS)	0.92	30.56	5.72

== Men's 50m EAD Freestyle - Heats ==
=== Men's 50m EAD Freestyle - Heat 01 ===
Pos.	Lane	Athlete	R.T.	50m	Tbh.
1	4	(Australia) Matthew John Cowdrey (AUS)	0.69	26.16	
2	3	(Wales) David Roberts (WAL)	0.99	29.20	3.04
3	5	(Australia) Benjamin James Austin (AUS)	0.87	27.78	1.62
4	6	(Australia) Alex James Harris (AUS)	0.91	29.93	3.77
5	7	(Cyprus) Andreas Potamitis (CYP)	0.92	35.28	9.12
6	2	(Singapore) Keng Joo Lim (SIN)	0.83	32.14	5.98
7	1	(Mauritius) Jean Pascal Laperotine (MRI)	1.14	41.02	14.86

=== Men's 50m EAD Freestyle - Heat 02 ===
Pos.	Lane	Athlete	R.T.	50m	Tbh.
1	3	(England) Matthew Benedict Walker (ENG)	1.00	29.03	3.45
2	4	(New Zealand) Daniel Robert Sharp (NZL)	0.83	25.58	
3	5	(Sri Lanka) Chaminda P. Kalugala Vithanage (SRI)	0.89	28.56	2.98
4	6	(Malaysia) Jaranding Stanley Anak (MAS)	0.86	29.03	3.45
5	2	(Singapore) Chen Hai Leow (SIN)	0.87	31.72	6.14
6	1	(Northern Ireland) Jonathan Cummings (NIR)	0.00	36.75	11.17
7	7	(India) Prem Kumar (IND)	1.11	36.57	10.99

=== Men's 50m EAD Freestyle - Heat 03 ===
Pos.	Lane	Athlete	R.T.	50m	Tbh.
1	4	(Canada) Benoît Huot (CAN)	0.85	25.08	
2	3	(Canada) Donovan Tildesley (CAN)	0.81	27.86	2.78
3	5	(Canada) Brian Hill (CAN)	0.85	26.68	1.60
4	6	(Malaysia) Tambi Razak Binti (MAS)	0.89	30.32	5.24
5	2	(Malaysia) Dawan Fraidden (MAS)	0.94	31.42	6.34
6	7	(India) Tirumalai Kumar Subbaiah (IND)	1.01	36.08	11.00
7	1	(Singapore) Teck Hua Lieu (SIN)	0.76	38.53	13.45
