= Denmark at the 2022 Winter Paralympics =

- Flag of Denmark
- IPC code: DEN
- NPC: Paralympic Committee Denmark
- Website: www.paralympic.dk

in Beijing, China 4 March 2022 – 13 March 2022
- Competitors: 1 (1 man) in 1 sport
- Flag bearer: Games Volunteer
- Medals: Gold 0 Silver 0 Bronze 0 Total 0

Winter Paralympics appearances (overview)
- 1980; 1984; 1988; 1992; 1994; 1998; 2002; 2006; 2010; 2014; 2018; 2022; 2026

Denmark competed at the 2022 Winter Paralympics in Beijing, China which took place between 4–13 March 2022. One alpine skier competed.

== Administration ==
Adam Nybo was not able to attend the opening ceremony after testing positive for COVID-19. He was also not able to compete in the men's giant slalom competition.

Michael Møllgaard Nielsen served as Chef de Mission.

== Competitors ==
The following is the list of number of competitors participating at the Games per sport/discipline.

Sport	Men	Women	Total
Alpine skiing	1	0	1
Total	1	0	1

== Alpine skiing ==
Athlete	Event	Run 1		Run 2		Total	
Athlete	Event	Time	Rank	Time	Rank	Time	Rank
Adam Nybo	Men's slalom, sitting	57.63	24	Disqualified			

== See also ==
- Denmark at the Paralympics
- Denmark at the 2022 Winter Olympics
