= Denmark at the 2014 Winter Paralympics =

- IPC code: DEN
- NPC: Paralympic Committee Denmark
- Website: www.paralympic.dk

in Sochi
- Competitors: 2 in 1 sport
- Medals: Gold 0 Silver 0 Bronze 0 Total 0

Winter Paralympics appearances (overview)
- 1980; 1984; 1988; 1992; 1994; 1998; 2002; 2006; 2010; 2014; 2018; 2022; 2026

Denmark sent a delegation to compete at the 2014 Winter Paralympics in Sochi, Russia from 7–16 March 2014. This was Denmark's tenth appearance at a Winter Paralympic Games. The Danish delegation to Sochi consisted of two alpine skiers, Ulrik Nyvold and Line Damgaard. Nyvold failed to finish either of his events, while Damgaard placed 12th in the women's standing slalom and 15th in the women's standing giant slalom.

== Background ==
Denmark first joined Paralympic competition at the 1968 Summer Paralympics, and first participated in the Winter Paralympics at the 1980 Winter Paralympics. Since their respective debuts, they have taken part in every Summer and Winter Paralympics, making Sochi their tenth appearance at a Winter Paralympics. The 2014 Winter Paralympics were held from 7–16 March 2014, in Sochi, Russia; 45 countries and 547 athletes took part in the multi-sport event. The Danish delegation to Sochi consisted of two alpine skiers, Ulrik Nyvold and Line Damgaard. Nyvold was chosen as the Danish flag-bearer for the parade of nations during the opening ceremony, and Damgaard was chosen to carry the flag for the closing ceremony.

== Disability classification ==
Every participant at the Paralympics has their disability grouped into one of five disability categories: amputation, the condition may be congenital or sustained through injury or illness; cerebral palsy; wheelchair athletes, though there is often overlap between this and other categories; visual impairment, including blindness; and Les autres, any physical disability that does not fall strictly under one of the other categories, like dwarfism or multiple sclerosis. Each Paralympic sport then has its own classifications, dependent upon the specific physical demands of competition. Events are given a code, made of numbers and letters, describing the type of event and classification of the athletes competing. Events with "B" in the code are for athletes with visual impairment, codes LW1 to LW9 are for athletes who stand to compete and LW10 to LW12 are for athletes who compete sitting down. Alpine skiing events grouped athletes into separate competitions for sitting, standing and visually impaired athletes.

== Alpine skiing ==
Ulrik Nyvold was 39 years old at the time of the Sochi Paralympics. He broke his back in a car wreck in 2005, and is classified as LW10-1, meaning he competes in a sitting position. On 13 March, he did not start the men's sitting slalom for unspecified reasons. Two days later, he participated in the Men's sitting giant slalom, finishing the first run in a time of 1 minute and 41.21 seconds and in 27th place. In the second run, he fell as he was nearing the bottom of the course, missing a gate. He was officially recorded as a "Did Not Finish" (DNF) for the competition.

Line Damgaard was 32 years old at the time of the Sochi Paralympics. A cancer survivor, her right leg was amputated in 2002. She is classified as LW2 and competes in a standing position. On 12 March, she took part in the women's standing slalom, finishing her first leg in a time of 1 minute and 54.94 seconds and her second in 1 minute and 58.96 seconds. Her total time was 3 minutes and 53.90 seconds, which put her in 12th and last place among those who finished the race; the gold medal was won by Andrea Rothfuss of Germany in 1 minute and 59.85 seconds. Four days later, she competed in the women's standing giant slalom, finishing her first run in 2 minutes and 8.4 seconds. She was significantly faster in her second run, posting a time of 1 minute and 53 seconds. Her final time was 4 minutes and 1.4 seconds, finishing in 15th and last place among classified finishers; the gold medal was won by Marie Bochet of France in a time of 2 minutes and 38.84 seconds.

Athlete	Event	Run 1			Run 2			Final/Total		
Athlete	Event	Time	Diff	Rank	Time	Diff	Rank	Time	Diff	Rank
Ulrik Nyvold	Men's slalom, sitting	DNS								
Ulrik Nyvold	Men's giant slalom, sitting	1:41.21	+23.11	27	DNF					
Line Damgaard	Women's slalom, standing	1:54.94	+55.57	12	1:58.96	+58.48	12	3:53.90	+1:54.05	12
Line Damgaard	Women's giant slalom, standing	2:08.40	+43.42	18	1:53.00	+39.14	15	4:01.40	+1:22.56	15

== See also ==
- Denmark at the Paralympics
- Denmark at the 2014 Winter Olympics
