= Ben Austin =

Australian Paralympic swimmer (born 1980)

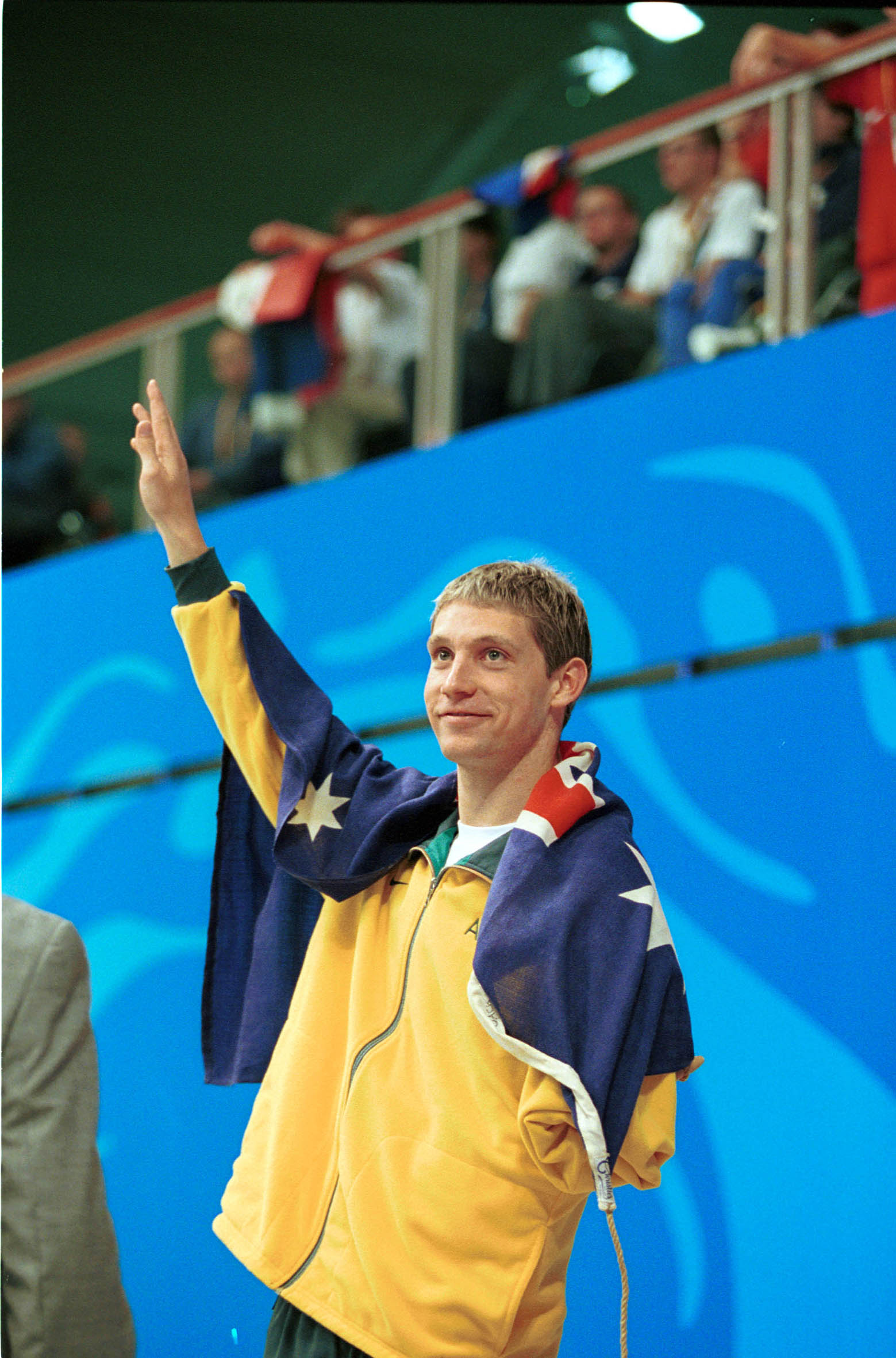
- Austin waves to the crowd as he celebrates his silver medal win in the 200 m medley SM8 event at the 2000 Summer Paralympics

Personal information
- Full name: Benjamin James Austin
- Nationality: Australia
- Born: 7 November 1980 (age 46) Wellington, New South Wales, Australia
- Height: 1.87 m (6 ft 2 in)
- Weight: 83 kg (183 lb)

Sport
- Sport: Swimming
- Strokes: Freestyle, medley, butterfly
- Classifications: S8, SB7, SM8
Medal record
Men's Paralympic swimming
Representing Australia
Paralympic Games
Gold medal – first place	2004 Athens	100 m freestyle S8
Gold medal – first place	2004 Athens	4×100 m medley
Gold medal – first place	2008 Beijing	4×100 m medley
Silver medal – second place	2000 Sydney	200 m medley SM8
Silver medal – second place	2000 Sydney	4×100 m freestyle
Silver medal – second place	2004 Athens	100 m butterfly S8
Silver medal – second place	2004 Athens	200 m medley SM8
Silver medal – second place	2004 Athens	4×100 m freestyle
Silver medal – second place	2008 Beijing	4×100 m freestyle
Bronze medal – third place	2000 Sydney	100 m butterfly S8
Bronze medal – third place	2000 Sydney	4×100 m medley
Bronze medal – third place	2004 Athens	50 m freestyle S8
IPC Swimming World Championships
Bronze medal – third place	2002 Mar del Plata	Men's 50 m Freestyle S8
Bronze medal – third place	2002 Mar del Plata	Men's 100 m Freestyle S8
Silver medal – second place	2002 Mar del Plata	Men's 100 m Freestyle Relay 34 pts
Gold medal – first place	2006 Durban	4×100 m medley 34 pts
Silver medal – second place	2006 Durban	4×100 m freestyle 34 pts
Bronze medal – third place	2006 Durban	100 m butterfly S8
Commonwealth Games
Gold medal – first place	2002 Manchester	EAD 50 m freestyle
Gold medal – first place	2002 Manchester	EAD 100 m freestyle
Gold medal – first place	2010 Delhi	100 m freestyle S8

Benjamin James Austin, OAM (born 7 November 1980) is an Australian Elite Athlete with a Disability (EAD) swimmer. His classification is S8 (above elbow amputee).

== Early life ==
Austin was born on 7 November 1980 in the New South Wales town of Wellington. He is Aboriginal via his maternal grandmother. When he was a few weeks old, doctors amputated his left arm above the elbow due to birth-related complications. Outside of swimming, he plays rugby league, rugby union, water polo and basketball. He is a university student, working on a degree that will allow him to become an English as a Second Language teacher. He is also studying kinesiology. He currently resides in Sydney, Australia. He is 187 centimetres (6 ft 2 in) tall and weighs 83 kilograms (183 lb). He has four sisters.

== Swimming ==
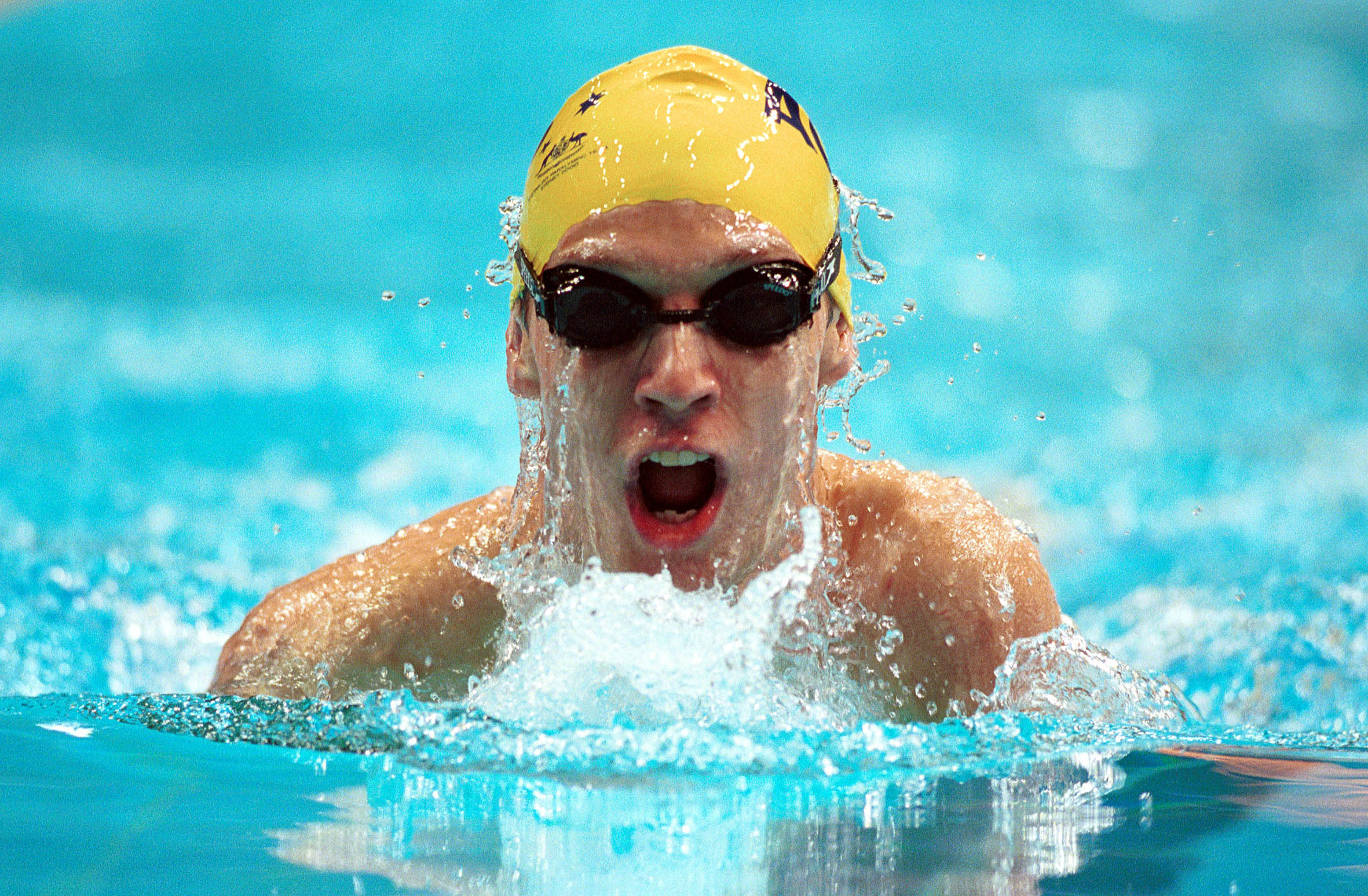
Austin swims his way to silver in the 200 m medley SM8 at the 2000 Summer Paralympics

Austin started swimming at five years of age, and began swimming competitively in 1996. He represented Australia for the first time in 1999. While he is primarily known for being a Paralympic swimmer, he also competed in able bodied swimming. He swims for Warringah Aquatic and is coached by Ben Davies. In 2008, he was coached by Graeme Carroll. He was an Australian Institute of Sport scholarship holder.

He has competed at the 2000 Summer Paralympics, the 2004 Summer Paralympics and the 2008 Summer Paralympics. At the 2000 Games, he won a silver medal in the 200 m individual medley, and two bronze medals in the 100 m butterfly and 4x100 m medley relay events. He went into the Sydney 2000 Games ranked number one for the 200m individual medley and held top 5 rankings in both the 100m and 50m freestyle and butterfly events. At the 2004 Games, he won two gold medals in the 100 m freestyle and 4×100 m medley events, for which he received a Medal of the Order of Australia, three silver medals in the 100 m butterfly, 200 m individual medley, and 4×100 m freestyle relay events, and a bronze medal in the 4x100 m freestyle relay. He set two world records at the 2004 Paralympic Games in the 100 m freestyle and 100 m butterfly events. At the 2008 Games, he won a gold medal in the Men's 4x100 m Medley 34 pts relay and a silver medal in the 4x100 m freestyle relay. He finished in fifth place in the 100 m butterfly event, and fourth in the 100 m freestyle event.

He competed at the IPC Swimming World Championships in 2002 and 2006. At the 2008 Australian Championships, he set a personal best time in the 100 m Freestyle event with a time of 0:59.08.

Austin became a pioneer of Australian swimming and he did this by bridging the gap of respect, recognition and equality to the Paralympic swimming movement in Australia, through his inspiring achievements and growing public profile.

Ben became the first Paralympic Telstra Dolphins Ambassador and also the first Paralympic ambassador for Austswim.

=== 2002 Manchester Commonwealth Games ===
Austin set two world records at the 2006 Commonwealth Games.

Heats
- 50 m EAD freestyle
  - 27.48 (WR) - 1st
- 100 m EAD freestyle
  - 1:00.27 (WR) - 1st
Finals
- 50 m EAD freestyle
  - 27.59 - 1st
- 100 m EAD freestyle
  - 1:00.21 (WR) - 1st

=== 2006 Melbourne Commonwealth Games ===
Austin set six world records at the 2006 Commonwealth Games.

Heats
- 50 m EAD freestyle
  - 27.78 - 3rd
- 100 m EAD freestyle
  - 1:00.21 - 2nd
Finals
- 50 m EAD freestyle
  - 28.03 - 6th
- 100 m EAD freestyle
  - 1:00.50 - 4th
