= Denmark at the 2026 Winter Paralympics =

- Flag of Denmark
- IPC code: DEN
- NPC: Paralympic Committee Denmark

in Milan & Cortina d'Ampezzo, Italy 6 March 2026 – 15 March 2026
- Competitors: 1 (1 man) in 1 sport
- Medals: Gold 0 Silver 0 Bronze 0 Total 0

Winter Paralympics appearances (overview)
- 1980; 1984; 1988; 1992; 1994; 1998; 2002; 2006; 2010; 2014; 2018; 2022; 2026

Denmark will compete at the 2026 Winter Paralympics in Milan & Cortina d'Ampezzo, Italy, which will take place between 6–15 March 2026.

== Competitors ==
The following is the list of number of competitors participating at the Games per sport/discipline.

Sport	Men	Women	Total
Para alpine skiing	1	0	1
Total	1	0	1

== Para alpine skiing ==
Athlete	Class	Event	Run 1		Run 2		Total	
Athlete	Class	Event	Time	Rank	Time	Rank	Time	Rank
Adam Nybo	LW12–1	Men's giant slalom, sitting	DNF					
Adam Nybo	LW12–1	Men's slalom, sitting	1:00.07	20	54.59	18	1:54.66	17

== See also ==
- Denmark at the Paralympics
- Denmark at the 2026 Winter Olympics
