= Denmark at the 2010 Winter Paralympics =

- IPC code: DEN
- NPC: Paralympic Committee Denmark
- Website: www.paralympic.dk

in Vancouver
- Competitors: 2 in 2 sports
- Flag bearer: Marianne Maibøll
- Medals: Gold 0 Silver 0 Bronze 0 Total 0

Winter Paralympics appearances (overview)
- 1980; 1984; 1988; 1992; 1994; 1998; 2002; 2006; 2010; 2014; 2018; 2022; 2026

Denmark sent two competitors to compete in two disciplines at the 2010 Winter Paralympics in Vancouver, British Columbia, Canada.

== Biathlon ==
| Athlete | Events | Final | | | | |
| Athlete | Events | Real time | Missed shots | Factor % | Finish time | Rank |
|---|---|---|---|---|---|---|
| Anne-Mette Bredahl | | | | | | |

== Cross-country skiing ==
| Athlete | Event | Final | | |
| Athlete | Event | Time | Calculated Time | Rank |
|---|---|---|---|---|
| Anne-Mette Bredahl | | | | |
| Marianne Maibøll | | | | |

== See also ==
- Denmark at the 2010 Winter Olympics
