= Denmark at the 1998 Winter Paralympics =

- IPC code: DEN
- NPC: Paralympic Committee Denmark
- Website: www.paralympic.dk

in Nagano
- Competitors: 3
- Medals Ranked 16th: Gold 1 Silver 0 Bronze 1 Total 2

Winter Paralympics appearances (overview)
- 1980; 1984; 1988; 1992; 1994; 1998; 2002; 2006; 2010; 2014; 2018; 2022; 2026

Denmark competed at the 1998 Winter Paralympics in Nagano, Japan. 3 competitors from Denmark won 2 medals, 1 gold and 1 bronze, and finished joint 16th in the medal table with Australia.

== See also ==
- Denmark at the Paralympics
- Denmark at the 1998 Winter Olympics
