= Denmark at the 1980 Winter Paralympics =

- IPC code: DEN
- NPC: Paralympic Committee Denmark
- Website: www.paralympic.dk
- Competitors: 8 (6 men and 2 women) in 1 sport
- Medals Ranked 11th: Gold 0 Silver 0 Bronze 0 Total 0

Winter Paralympics appearances (overview)
- 1980; 1984; 1988; 1992; 1994; 1998; 2002; 2006; 2010; 2014; 2018; 2022; 2026

Denmark competed at the 1980 Winter Paralympics in held in Geilo, Norway. Eight competitors (six men and two women) from Denmark did not win any medals and so finished last in the medal table.

All athletes competed in cross-country skiing.

== Cross-country ==
The following athletes represented Denmark:

- Jens Bromann
- Arne Christensen
- Bent Christensen
- Jorn Clausen
- Else Hansen
- Michael Hansen
- Peder Hansen
- Helene Helledi

No medals were won.

== See also ==
- Denmark at the Paralympics
- Denmark at the 1980 Summer Paralympics
