= Denmark at the 2018 Winter Paralympics =

- IPC code: DEN
- NPC: Paralympic Committee Denmark
- Website: http://www.paralympic.dk

in Pyeongchang
- Competitors: 1 in 1 sport
- Flag bearer: Daniel Wagner
- Medals: Gold 0 Silver 0 Bronze 0 Total 0

Winter Paralympics appearances (overview)
- 1980; 1984; 1988; 1992; 1994; 1998; 2002; 2006; 2010; 2014; 2018; 2022; 2026

Denmark sent one competitor to the 2018 Winter Paralympics in Pyeongchang, South Korea.

== Team ==
The table below contains the list of members of people (called "Team Denmark") that will be participating in the 2018 Games.

Team Denmark
Name	Sport	Gender	Classification	Events	Ref.
Daniel Wagner	Para-snowboarding	Male			

== Background ==
In the autumn of 2017, responsibility for sending a team to the Paralympics was changed from Parasport Denmark, the National Paralympic Committee of Denmark, to the National Olympic Committee and Sports Confederation of Denmark (DIF). The decision was made because people wanted to make Olympic and Paralympic sport more equal. Niels Christiansen, secretary general of Parasport Denmark, said, "We are very happy with the move, and we look forward to working together with DIF. The Paralympics and the development and preparation of world class Para-athletes is still very much a focal point of our work in Parasport Denmark, but allowing DIF to take the reigns [sic] sends an important message and hopefully it will lead to even more Paralympic success for Denmark." Despite this change, Parasport Denmark was still in charge of preparing to send a team to the Winter Paralympic Games.

== History ==
Denmark first went to the Winter Paralympics in 1980 in Geilo. Before South Korea, they had won a total of two gold medals, one silver medal and three bronze medals at the Winter Games. Both of their gold medals and all of their bronze medals were won by para-Nordic blind skier Anne-Mette Bredahl. Her gold medals were in the biathlon 7.5 kilometres free technique B 1-3 race. The last time the country won a medal was at the 1994 Winter Paralympics. Denmark sends few people to the Winter Paralympics. They sent six people to the 2006 Winter Paralympics, and two to the 2010 and 2014 Games.

== Snowboarding ==
Banked slalom

Athlete	Event	Run 1	Run 2	Run 3	Best	Rank
Daniel Wagner	Men's banked slalom, SB-LL1	1:07.24	1:12.11	1:08.32	1:07.24	9

Snowboard cross

Athlete	Event	Seeding						1/8 final	Quarterfinal	Semifinal	Final	
Athlete	Event	Run 1		Run 2		Best	Seed	1/8 final	Quarterfinal	Semifinal	Final	
Athlete	Event	Time	Rank	Time	Rank	Best	Seed	Position	Position	Position	Position	Rank
Daniel Wagner	Men's snowboard cross, SB-LL1	1:11.76	8	Canceled		1:11.76	8 Q	Moen (NOR); W	Elliott (USA); L	did not advance		8
