= Swimming at the 2004 Summer Paralympics – Men's 400 metre freestyle S8 =

Men's 400m Freestyle S8 at the XII Paralympic Games
- Paralympic Swimming
- Venue: Olympic Aquatic Centre
- Dates: 24 September 2004
- Competitors: 11 from 9 nations
- Winning time: 4:40.30

Medalists
1st place, gold medalist(s)		Christoph Burkard	Germany
2nd place, silver medalist(s)		Christopher Kueken	Germany
3rd place, bronze medalist(s)		Mihovil Spanja	Croatia

The Men's 400 metre freestyle S8 swimming event at the 2004 Summer Paralympics was competed on 24 September. It was won by Christoph Burkard, representing Germany.

== 1st round ==
Qualified for final round

Heat 1

24 Sept. 2004, morning session

Rank	Athlete	Time	Notes
1	Mihovil Spanja (CRO)	4:58.61	
2	Justin Fleming (USA)	5:02.77	
3	Wang Xiao Fu (CHN)	5:07.23	
4	Matt Levy (AUS)	5:07.73	
5	Oliver Nathan (RSA)	5:20.56	

Heat 2

24 Sept. 2004, morning session

Rank	Athlete	Time	Notes
1	Christopher Kueken (GER)	4:54.97	
2	Christoph Burkard (GER)	4:55.64	
3	Juan Francisco Jimenez (ESP)	5:00.80	
4	Tiaan du Plessis (RSA)	5:01.72	
5	Matteo Lenza (ITA)	5:14.45	
	Konstantinos Fykas (GRE)	DNS	

== Final round ==
24 Sept. 2004, evening session

Rank	Athlete	Time	Notes
1st place, gold medalist(s)	Christoph Burkard (GER)	4:40.30	WR
2nd place, silver medalist(s)	Christopher Kueken (GER)	4:47.66	
3rd place, bronze medalist(s)	Mihovil Spanja (CRO)	4:48.88	
4	Juan Francisco Jimenez (ESP)	4:55.50	
5	Wang Xiao Fu (CHN)	4:58.73	
6	Tiaan du Plessis (RSA)	5:02.13	
7	Justin Fleming (USA)	5:04.60	
8	Matt Levy (AUS)	5:04.64	
