= Denmark at the 1994 Winter Paralympics =

- IPC code: DEN
- NPC: Paralympic Committee Denmark
- Website: www.paralympic.dk

in Lillehammer
- Competitors: 3
- Medals Ranked 16th: Gold 1 Silver 0 Bronze 2 Total 3

Winter Paralympics appearances (overview)
- 1980; 1984; 1988; 1992; 1994; 1998; 2002; 2006; 2010; 2014; 2018; 2022; 2026

Denmark competed at the 1994 Winter Paralympics in Lillehammer, Norway. 3 competitors from Denmark won 3 medals, 1 gold and 2 bronze, and finished 16th in the medal table.

== See also ==
- Denmark at the Paralympics
- Denmark at the 1994 Winter Olympics
