= Denmark at the 1992 Winter Paralympics =

- IPC code: DEN
- NPC: Paralympic Committee Denmark
- Website: www.paralympic.dk

in Tignes-Albertville
- Competitors: 5
- Medals Ranked 18th: Gold 0 Silver 1 Bronze 0 Total 1

Winter Paralympics appearances (overview)
- 1980; 1984; 1988; 1992; 1994; 1998; 2002; 2006; 2010; 2014; 2018; 2022; 2026

Denmark competed at the 1992 Winter Paralympics in Tignes/Albertville, France. 5 competitors from Denmark won a single silver medal and finished 18th in the medal table.

== See also ==
- Denmark at the Paralympics
- Denmark at the 1992 Winter Olympics
