= Denmark at the 1988 Winter Paralympics =

- Flag of Denmark
- IPC code: DEN
- NPC: Paralympic Committee Denmark
- Competitors: 3 (3 men and 0 women) in 2 sports and 6 events
- Medals Ranked 16th: Gold 0 Silver 0 Bronze 0 Total 0

Winter Paralympics appearances (overview)
- 1980; 1984; 1988; 1992; 1994; 1998; 2002; 2006; 2010; 2014; 2018; 2022; 2026

Denmark competed at the 1988 Winter Paralympics in held in Innsbruck, Austria. Three competitors from Denmark did not win any medals and so finished last in the medal table. Two athletes competed in alpine skiing and one athlete competed in cross-country skiing.

== Alpine skiing ==
Hans Ole Nielsen competed in the following events:

- Men's Downhill B1 (finished in 6th place)
- Men's Giant Slalom B1 (did not finish)

Lars Nielsen competed in the following events:

- Men's Downhill B2 (finished in 5th place)
- Men's Giant Slalom B2 (finished in 5th place)

== Cross-country ==
Arne Christensen competed in cross-country skiing in the following events:

- Men's Short Distance 15 km B1 (finished in 13th place)
- Men's Long Distance 30 km B1 (finished in 15th place)

== See also ==
- Denmark at the Paralympics
- Denmark at the 1988 Summer Paralympics
