= Denmark at the 2006 Winter Paralympics =

- IPC code: DEN
- NPC: Paralympic Committee Denmark
- Website: www.paralympic.dk

in Turin
- Competitors: 6 in 2 sports
- Medals Ranked 20th: Gold 0 Silver 0 Bronze 0 Total 0

Winter Paralympics appearances (overview)
- 1980; 1984; 1988; 1992; 1994; 1998; 2002; 2006; 2010; 2014; 2018; 2022; 2026

Denmark participated in the ninth Winter Paralympics in Turin, Italy.

Denmark entered six athletes in the following sports:

- Nordic skiing: 1 female
- Wheelchair curling: 3 male, 2 female

== Medalists ==
	(gold)	(silver)	(bronze)	Total
Denmark	0	0	0	0

== See also ==
- 2006 Winter Paralympics
- Denmark at the 2006 Winter Olympics
