= Denmark at the 1984 Winter Paralympics =

- IPC code: DEN
- NPC: Paralympic Committee Denmark
- Competitors: 5 (3 men and 2 women) in 2 sports
- Medals Ranked 14th: Gold 0 Silver 0 Bronze 0 Total 0

Winter Paralympics appearances (overview)
- 1980; 1984; 1988; 1992; 1994; 1998; 2002; 2006; 2010; 2014; 2018; 2022; 2026

Denmark competed at the 1984 Winter Paralympics in held in Innsbruck, Austria. Five competitors from Denmark did not win any medals and so finished last in the medal table.

Four athletes (two men, two women) competed in cross-country skiing and one male athlete competed in alpine skiing.

== Alpine skiing ==
Lars Lauridsen competed at four events in alpine skiing:

- Men's Alpine Combination LW2
- Men's Giant Slalom LW2
- Men's Slalom LW2'
- Men's Downhill LW2

== Cross-country ==
The following athletes competed at cross-country skiing:

- Arne Christensen
- Else Hansen
- Michael Hansen
- Inger Joergensen

== See also ==
- Denmark at the Paralympics
- Denmark at the 1984 Summer Paralympics
