= Denmark at the 2002 Winter Paralympics =

- IPC code: DEN
- NPC: Paralympic Committee Denmark
- Website: www.paralympic.dk

in Salt Lake City
- Competitors: 1
- Medals: Gold 0 Silver 0 Bronze 0 Total 0

Winter Paralympics appearances (overview)
- 1980; 1984; 1988; 1992; 1994; 1998; 2002; 2006; 2010; 2014; 2018; 2022; 2026

Denmark competed at the 2002 Winter Paralympics in Salt Lake City, United States. One competitor from Denmark won no medals and so did not place in the medal table.

== See also ==
- Denmark at the Paralympics
- Denmark at the 2002 Winter Olympics
