= Ricka Stenger =

Danish Paralympic swimmer

Personal information
- Born: 1979 (age 46–47) Esbjerg, Denmark

Sport
- Sport: Paralympic swimming
- Disability class: S9
Medal record
Representing Denmark
World Championships
Gold medal – first place	1998 Christchurch	50m freestyle S9
Silver medal – second place	1998 Christchurch	100m freestyle S9
Bronze medal – third place	1998 Christchurch	200m individual medley SM9
Paralympic Games
Gold medal – first place	2000 Sydney	50m freestyle S9
Gold medal – first place	2000 Sydney	200m individual medley SM9
Silver medal – second place	2000 Sydney	100m butterfly S9
Bronze medal – third place	1996 Atlanta	50m freestyle S9
Bronze medal – third place	1996 Atlanta	100m breaststroke SB10
Bronze medal – third place	1996 Atlanta	200m individual medley SM9

Ricka Stenger (born 1979) is a Danish former Paralympic swimmer who competed at international swimming competitions. She is a Paralympic and World champion and has competed at the 1996 and 2000 Summer Paralympics, Stenger was first Danish Paralympic swimmer to win gold at the Summer Paralympics.

Stenger was born without her left hand.
