= Matt Walker (swimmer) =

British Paralympic swimmer (born 1978)

Matt Walker MBE
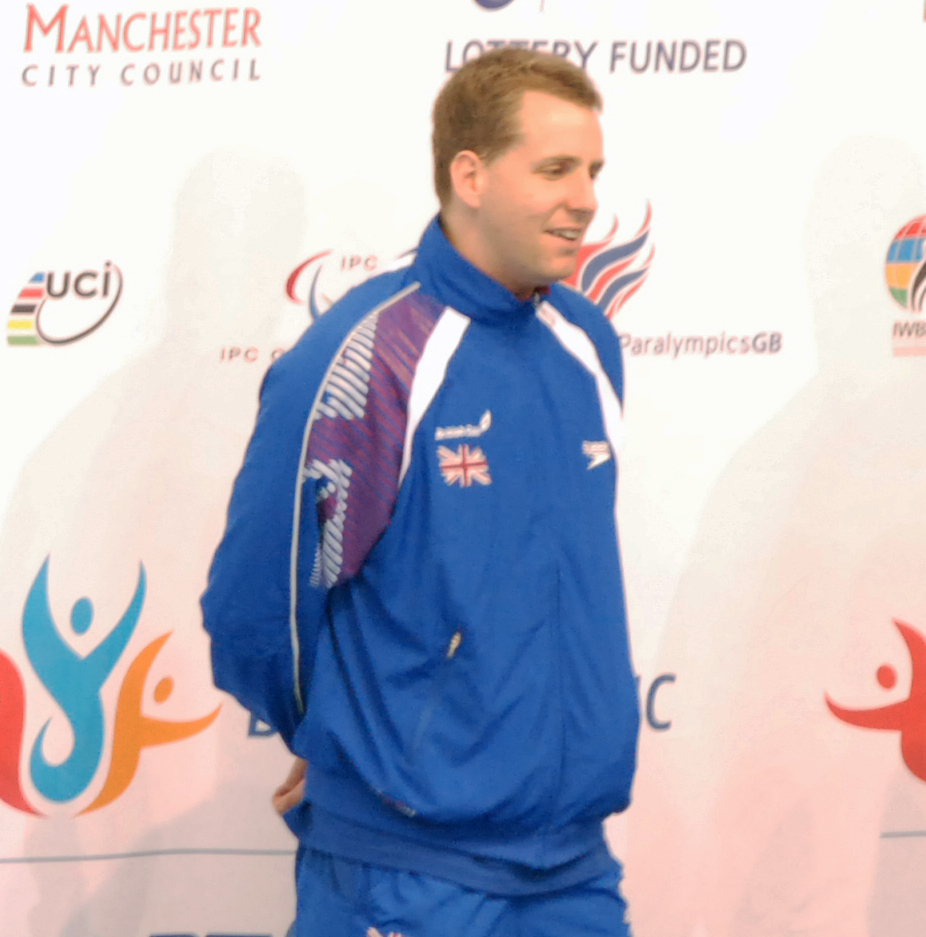
- Walker at the 2009 BT Paralympic World Cup.

Personal information
- Full name: Matthew Benedict Walker
- Nationality: British
- Born: 25 April 1978 (age 48) Stockport, England
- Height: 1.83 m (6 ft 0 in)

Sport
- Sport: Swimming
- Club: Marple
Medal record
Men's swimming
Event	1st	2nd	3rd
Paralympic Games	3	5	4
World Championships	4	3	3
European Championships	4	4	0
Commonwealth Games	0	0	1
Representing Great Britain
Paralympic Games
Gold medal – first place	2000 Sydney	4×100 m freestyle 34 pts
Gold medal – first place	2004 Athens	4×100 m freestyle 34 pts
Gold medal – first place	2008 Beijing	4×100 m freestyle 34 pts
Silver medal – second place	2000 Sydney	50 m freestyle S7
Silver medal – second place	2004 Athens	50 m freestyle S7
Silver medal – second place	2004 Athens	100 m freestyle S7
Silver medal – second place	2008 Beijing	50 m freestyle S7
Silver medal – second place	2008 Beijing	50 m butterfly S7
Bronze medal – third place	2000 Sydney	100 m breaststroke SB7
Bronze medal – third place	2008 Beijing	100 m freestyle S7
Bronze medal – third place	2008 Beijing	200 m individual medley SM7
Bronze medal – third place	2012 London	50 m freestyle SM7
World Championships
Gold medal – first place	1998 Christchurch	50 m freestyle S7
Gold medal – first place	2006 Durban	4x100 m medley relay 34pts
Gold medal – first place	2010 Eindhoven	50 m freestyle S7
Gold medal – first place	2013 Montreal	50 m freestyle S7
Silver medal – second place	2002 Mar del Plata	50 m freestyle S7
Silver medal – second place	2002 Mar del Plata	200 m medley SM7
Silver medal – second place	2010 Eindhoven	50 m butterfly S7
Bronze medal – third place	2006 Durban	50 m freestyle S7
Bronze medal – third place	2006 Durban	100 m freestyle S7
Bronze medal – third place	2010 Eindhoven	4x100 m medley relay 34pts
European Championships
Gold medal – first place	2009 Reykjavik	50 m freestyle S7
Gold medal – first place	2009 Reykjavik	100 m freestyle S7
Gold medal – first place	2009 Reykjavik	50 m butterfly S7
Gold medal – first place	2009 Reykjavik	4x100 m freestyle relay 34pts
Silver medal – second place	2009 Reykjavik	200 m individual medley SM7
Silver medal – second place	2014 Eindhoven	50 m freestyle S7
Silver medal – second place	2014 Eindhoven	100 m freestyle S7
Silver medal – second place	2014 Eindhoven	4x100 m medley 34pts
Representing England
Commonwealth Games
Bronze medal – third place	2006 Melbourne	50 m EAD freestyle

Matthew "Matt" Benedict Walker MBE (born 25 April 1978 in Stockport, England) is a British swimmer who has participated in four Paralympic Games, winning eleven medals. He competes in the S7 (butterfly and freestyle), SM7 (medley) and SB7 (breaststroke) classifications.

== Career ==
Walker's first international medal came with a bronze in the 100 m breaststroke at the 1997 European Championships in Spain. Since then he has gone on to win four further European Championship medals and eight World Championship medals. He also won a bronze medal in the 50 m freestyle and finished fourth in the 100 m freestyle, at the 2006 Commonwealth Games in Melbourne, where he was the only disabled swimmer representing England.

=== Paralympics ===
Walker competed in the Paralympics for the first time during the 2000 games, in Sydney. In all he took home three medals from these games, a bronze in the 100 m breaststroke SB7, silver in the 50 m freestyle S7 and gold in the 4×100 m freestyle 34 pts. As part of the gold medal winning relay team, which also included Jody Cundy, Giles Long and David Roberts, he set a new world record time of 4:06.85.

In the 2004 Summer Paralympics, in Athens, Walker won a further two individual medals, silvers in both the 50 and 100 m S7 freestyle events. He was again part of the gold medal winning 4×100 m freestyle 34 pts relay team, which also included Roberts, Graham Edmunds and Robert Welbourn, that set a new world record of 3:59.62.

Beijing 2008 was Walker's third appearance at a Paralympics, and his most successful to date with five medals won. He medalled in both the 50 and 100 m S7 freestyle events, as he had done in Athens, and picked up medals in butterfly and medley events for the first time, winning silver in the 50 m S7 butterfly, with a European record time of 32.24 seconds, and bronze in the 200 m individual medley SM7. Competing alongside David Roberts, Robert Welbourn and Graham Edmunds, Walker won a gold medal in the 4×100 m freestyle 34 pts for the third time in as many Games. This meant that he has now won eleven Paralympic medals, with all of his silver and bronze medals being won individually and all three of his golds being in relay events.

Walker was appointed Member of the Order of the British Empire (MBE) in the 2009 New Year Honours for services to disabled sport.

In the 2012 Paralympics, within the S7 category, Walker participated in the 50m freestyle, 100m freestyle, 50m butterfly, winning bronze in the former category.

== See also ==
- List of IPC world records in swimming
- Swimming at the 2000 Summer Paralympics
- Swimming at the 2004 Summer Paralympics
- Swimming at the 2008 Summer Paralympics
- Swimming at the 2012 Summer Paralympics
