= Denmark at the 2000 Summer Paralympics =

- IPC code: DEN
- NPC: Paralympic Committee Denmark
- Website: www.paralympic.dk

in Sydney
- Medals Ranked 19th: Gold 8 Silver 8 Bronze 14 Total 30

Summer Paralympics appearances (overview)
- 1968; 1972; 1976; 1980; 1984; 1988; 1992; 1996; 2000; 2004; 2008; 2012; 2016; 2020; 2024

There were 12 female and 26 male athletes representing the country at the 2000 Summer Paralympics.

== Medallists ==
Medal	Name	Sport	Event
Gold	Thomas Bradal	Athletics	Men's Javelin F55
Gold	Jakob Mathiasen	Athletics	Men's Javelin F42
Gold	Rene Nielsen	Athletics	Men's Javelin F46
Gold	Martin Enggaard Pedersen; Kenneth Hansen; Soren Jensen; Ferundun Kahraman; Henri Nooyen; Peter Weichel; Thomas Wetche	Goalball	Men's tournament
Gold	Peter Lund Andersen	Swimming	Men's 400 m Freestyle S6
Gold	Sisse Grynet Egeborg	Swimming	Women's 100 m Breaststroke SB8
Gold	Ricka Stenger	Swimming	Women's 200 m Medley SM9
Gold	Ricka Stenger	Swimming	Women's 50 m Freestyle S9
Silver	Jakob Mathiasen	Athletics	Men's Pentathlon P42
Silver	Rene Nielsen	Athletics	Men's Shot Put F56
Silver	Brita Andersen	Equestrian	Mixed Dressage - Championship grade I
Silver	Brita Andersen	Equestrian	Mixed Dressage - Freestyle grade I
Silver	Jens Als Andersen	Sailing	Mixed Single Person 2.4mr
Silver	Emil Broendum	Swimming	Men's 100 m Butterfly S8
Silver	Christian Bundgaard	Swimming	Men's 100 m Breaststroke SB11
Silver	Ricka Stenger	Swimming	Women's 100 m Butterfly S9
Bronze	Rene Nielsen	Athletics	Men's Pentathlon P58
Bronze	Peter Lund Andersen	Swimming	Men's 100 m Freestyle S6
Bronze	Peter Lund Andersen	Swimming	Men's 50 m Freestyle S6
Bronze	Karen Breumsoe	Swimming	Women's 100 m Freestyle S4
Bronze	Karen Breumsoe	Swimming	Women's 200 m Freestyle S4
Bronze	Karen Breumsoe	Swimming	Women's 50 m Freestyle S4
Bronze	Emil Broendum	Swimming	Men's 400 m Freestyle S8
Bronze	Emil Broendum	Swimming	Men's 50 m Freestyle S8
Bronze	Martin Jacobsen	Swimming	Men's 100 m Breaststroke SB8
Bronze	Ivan Nielsen	Swimming	Men's 100 m Breaststroke SB13
Bronze	John Petersson	Swimming	Men's 150 m Medley SM4
Bronze	John Petersson	Swimming	Men's 200 m Freestyle S4
Bronze	John Petersson	Swimming	Men's 50 m Butterfly S4
Bronze	Pernille Thomsen	Swimming	Women's 50 m Freestyle S8

== See also ==
- 2000 Summer Paralympics

== Bibliography ==
- International Paralympic Committee (2000). "Appendix C: Athlete Numbers - By Delegation". Sydney 2000 Paralympic Games Post Games Report. Sydney.
