= Philippe Gagnon (swimmer) =

Canadian Paralympic swimmer

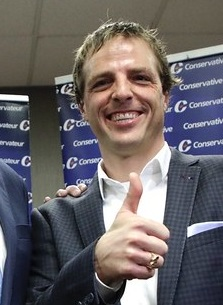

Personal information
- Full name: Philippe Gagnon
- Nationality: Canadian
- Born: January 20, 1980 (age 46) Chicoutimi, Quebec
- Height: 6 ft 0 in (1.83 m)
- Weight: 165 lb (75 kg)

Sport
- Sport: Swimming
- Strokes: butterfly, freestyle
Medal record
Paralympics
| Gold medal – first place | 2000 Sydney | 100 m freestyle S10 |
| Gold medal – first place | 2000 Sydney | 400 m freestyle S10 |
| Gold medal – first place | 2000 Sydney | 4×100 m medley 34pts |
| Silver medal – second place | 2000 Sydney | 100 m butterfly S10 |
Commonwealth Games
| Silver medal – second place | 2002 Manchester | 50 m EAD freestyle |
- Updated on January 19, 2014

Philippe Gagnon (born January 20, 1980) is a Canadian retired Paralympic swimmer and politician. Gagnon ran as a Conservative in the riding of Jonquière in the 2019 federal election.

== Swimming career ==
A native of Chicoutimi, Quebec, Gagnon was born with clubfeet. He first competed for Canada at the 2000 Summer Paralympics in Sydney, where he won gold in the 100 metre freestyle S10 in a world record time of 54.30, gold in the 400 metre freestyle S10 in a Paralympic record time of 4:11.44, and silver in the 100 metre butterfly S10 in 1:00.25. In the relays, Gagnon, along with Benoît Huot, Adam Purdy, and Andrew Haley, won gold in the 4×100 metre medley 34pts in a world record time of 4:32.39, and with Haley, Purdy, and Brad Sales finished 4th in the 4×100 metre freestyle 34pts in 4:14.69.

At the 2002 Commonwealth Games in Manchester, Gagnon won silver in the 50 metre EAD freestyle. Competing against swimmers in other classifications, Gagnon covered the distance in 25.04, equaling the world record. In the 100 metre EAD freestyle, Gagnon finished 5th in 54.65.

== Politics ==
Gagnon ran for a seat in the House of Commons of Canada for the Conservative Party in the riding of Jonquière in the 2019 federal election.

=== Electoral record ===
2019 Canadian federal election: Jonquière
| Party | Candidate | Votes | % | ±% | Expenditures |
|---|---|---|---|---|---|
| Bloc Québécois | Mario Simard | 17,577 | 35.6 | +12.31 | $11,695.16 |
| New Democratic | Karine Trudel | 12,141 | 24.6 | -4.59 | $58,005.08 |
| Conservative | Philippe Gagnon | 10,338 | 20.9 | +4.01 | $52,967.51 |
| Liberal | Vincent Garneau | 7,849 | 15.9 | -12.58 | $42,992.12 |
| Green | Lyne Bourdages | 1,009 | 2.0 | +0.64 | $0.00 |
| People's | Sylvie Théodore | 453 | 0.9 | | $1,360.01 |
| Total valid votes/expense limit | | 49,367 | 100.0 | | |
| Total rejected ballots | | 999 | | | |
| Turnout | | 50,366 | 69.3 | | |
| Eligible voters | | 72,713 | | | |
| Bloc Québécois gain from New Democratic | | Swing | | +8.45 | |
Source: Elections Canada
