= Ricardo Moffatti =

Personal information
- Nationality: Australia
- Born: 16 December 1986 (age 39) Mount Isa, Queensland, Australia
Medal record
Swimming
Paralympic Games
Silver medal – second place	2004 Athens	Men's 4x100 m Freestyle 34 pts
Bronze medal – third place	2004 Athens	Men's 100 m Freestyle S8
IPC Swimming World Championships
Silver medal – second place	2006 Durban	4×100 m freestyle 34 pts

Ricardo Moffatti (born 16 December 1986) is a Paralympic swimming competitor from Australia. He was born in Mount Isa, Queensland. He won a bronze medal at the 2004 Athens Games in the Men's 100 m Freestyle S8 event, and a silver medal in the Men's 4 × 100 m Freestyle 34 pts event. He also competed at the 2008 Summer Paralympics. Moffatti is from Queensland.
