= Christoph Burkard =

German Paralympic swimmer

Personal information
- Born: 14 November 1983 (age 42) Rottweil, West Germany
- Height: 182 cm (6 ft 0 in)
- Weight: 63 kg (139 lb)

Sport
- Country: Germany
- Sport: Paralympic swimming
- Disability: Dysmelia
- Disability class: S8, SB6, SM8
Medal record
Paralympic swimming
Representing Germany
Paralympic Games
Gold medal – first place	2004 Athens	Men's 400m freestyle S8
Bronze medal – third place	2012 London	Men's 100m breaststroke SB6
World Championships (LC)
Silver medal – second place	2006 Durban	Men's 400m freestyle S8
Silver medal – second place	2010 Eindhoven	Men's 400m freestyle S8
Bronze medal – third place	2010 Eindhoven	Men's 100m breaststroke SB6
World Championships (SC)
Gold medal – first place	2009 Rio de Janeiro	Men's 100m breaststroke SB6
Bronze medal – third place	2009 Rio de Janeiro	Men's 400m freestyle S8
European Championships
Bronze medal – third place	2014 Eindhoven	Men's 100m breaststroke SB6

Christoph Burkard (born 14 November 1983) is a retired German Paralympic swimmer who specialises in freestyle swimming and breaststroke and he competes in international level events. He is a four time World medalist, Paralympic champion and a European bronze medalist. He was born without his lower legs.
