= Jakob Mathiasen =

Danish Paralympic athlete

Medal record

Track and field (P42)

Representing Denmark

Paralympic Games
Gold medal – first place	2000 Sydney	Javelin throw F42
Gold medal – first place	2004 Athens	Javelin throw F42
Silver medal – second place	1996 Atlanta	Javelin throw F42
Silver medal – second place	2000 Sydney	Pentathlon P42
Bronze medal – third place	1996 Atlanta	Pentathlon P42

Jakob Mathiasen is a Paralympian athlete from Denmark competing mainly in category P42 javelin throw events.

He competed in the 1996 Summer Paralympics in Atlanta, United States. There he won a silver medal in the men's Javelin throw - F42 event, a bronze medal in the men's Pentathlon - P42 event and finished eighth in the men's High jump - F42-44 event. He also competed at the 2000 Summer Paralympics in Sydney, Australia. There he won a gold medal in the men's Javelin throw - F42 event, a silver medal in the men's Pentathlon - P42 event, finished eighth in the men's Discus throw - F42 event and finished ninth in the men's Long jump - F42 event. He also competed at the 2004 Summer Paralympics in Athens, Greece. There he won a gold medal in the men's Javelin throw - F42 event
