= Travis Mohr =

American Paralympic swimmer (born 1981)

Personal information
- Born: 1981 (age 44–45) Northampton, Pennsylvania
- Height: 4 ft 3 in (130 cm)

Sport
- Country: United States
- Sport: Paralympic swimming
- Disability class: S8
Medal record
Men's Swimming
Paralympic Games
| Gold medal – first place | 2000 Sydney | 100m breaststroke SB6 |
| Gold medal – first place | 2004 Athens | 100m backstroke S8 |
| Silver medal – second place | 2004 Athens | 100m breaststroke SB6 |
| Bronze medal – third place | 2000 Sydney | 100m backstroke S8 |
World Championships
| Gold medal – first place | 1998 Christchurch | 100m breaststroke SB6 |
| Gold medal – first place | 2002 Mar del Plata | 100m breaststroke SB6 |
| Gold medal – first place | 2002 Mar del Plata | 100m backstroke S8 |
| Silver medal – second place | 1998 Christchurch | 200m individual medley SM8 |
| Silver medal – second place | 2006 Durban | 100m backstroke S8 |
| Silver medal – second place | 2006 Durban | 100m breaststroke SB6 |
| Bronze medal – third place | 1998 Christchurch | 100m backstroke S8 |

Travis Mohr (born May 1, 1981) is a former world record setting Paralympic swimmer and civil engineer.

Born without femurs in both of his legs, Mohr began swimming lessons at the age of 5. Mohr went on to compete in the 1996 Summer Paralympics at the age of 15. Though he did not medal, Mohr continued competing and qualified for the 2000 Sydney Paralympic Games where he won a bronze and gold medal in his classification.

In 2002 at the IPC World Championships he won two more gold medals. At the Canadian Open in 2003 he set three new world records: the 100m freestyle, the 200m individual medley and the 100m breaststroke. He broke his own 100m breaststroke record later that year at the Last Chance Meet in Indianapolis, Indiana.

In 2004 Mohr broke his own record for the second time at the Paralympic swim trials in Minnesota and set a new world record in the 50m breaststroke.

Mohr went on to win a gold and silver medal at the 2004 Summer Paralympics. Mohr broke his world record again for the 50m breaststroke.

Mohr graduated from Drexel University in 2004 with a degree in civil engineering.

In 2003 and 2004 Mohr was the recipient of the USA Swimming Trischa L. Zorn Award.

Mohr was nominated in 2004 for an ESPY Award for Best Athlete with a Disability.
