= David Roberts (swimmer) =

Welsh swimmer (born 1980)

David Roberts CBE
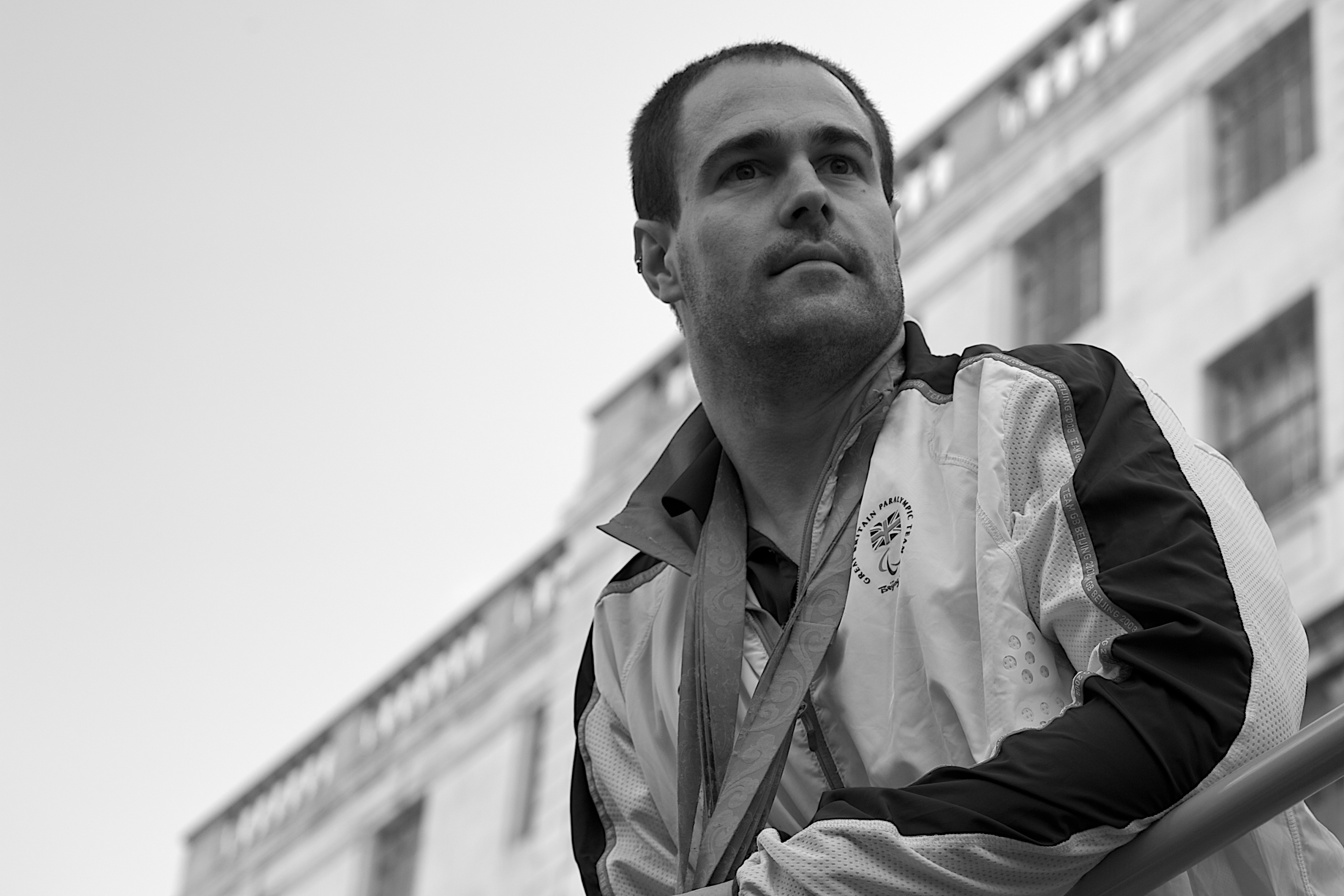
- Roberts at the London 2008 Olympic victory parade

Personal information
- Full name: David Evan Roberts
- Born: 25 May 1980 (age 46) Llantwit Fardre, Wales, United Kingdom

Sport
- Country: Great Britain; Wales
- Sport: Para swimming
- Disability class: S7
Medal record
Men's para swimming (S7)
Representing Great Britain
Paralympic Games
Gold medal – first place	2000 Sydney	50 m freestyle S7
Gold medal – first place	2000 Sydney	100 m freestyle S7
Gold medal – first place	2000 Sydney	4×100 m freestyle 34 pts
Gold medal – first place	2004 Athens	50 m freestyle S7
Gold medal – first place	2004 Athens	100 m freestyle S7
Gold medal – first place	2004 Athens	400 m freestyle S7
Gold medal – first place	2004 Athens	4×100 m freestyle 34 pts
Gold medal – first place	2008 Beijing	100 m freestyle S7
Gold medal – first place	2008 Beijing	4×100 m freestyle 34 pts
Gold medal – first place	2008 Beijing	400 m freestyle S7
Gold medal – first place	2008 Beijing	50 m freestyle S7
Silver medal – second place	2000 Sydney	100 m backstroke S7
Silver medal – second place	2000 Sydney	400 m freestyle S7
Silver medal – second place	2000 Sydney	4×100 m medley 34 pts
Silver medal – second place	2004 Athens	200 m indiv. medley SM7
Bronze medal – third place	2000 Sydney	4×50 m freestyle 20 pts
World Championships
Gold medal – first place	2002 Mar Del Plata	50 m freestyle S7
Gold medal – first place	2002 Mar Del Plata	100 m freestyle S7
Gold medal – first place	2002 Mar Del Plata	4×100 m medley 34 pts
Gold medal – first place	2006 Durban	50 m freestyle S7
Gold medal – first place	2006 Durban	100 m freestyle S7
Gold medal – first place	2006 Durban	400 m freestyle S7
Gold medal – first place	2006 Durban	4×100 m freestyle 34 pts
Gold medal – first place	2010 Eindhoven	100 m freestyle S7
Silver medal – second place	2002 Mar Del Plata	400 m freestyle S7
Silver medal – second place	2006 Durban	4×100 m medley 34 pts
Silver medal – second place	2010 Eindhoven	400 m freestyle S7
Bronze medal – third place	2002 Mar Del Plata	4×100 m freestyle 34 pts
Bronze medal – third place	2006 Durban	200 m individual medley S7
Bronze medal – third place	2010 Eindhoven	50 m freestyle S7
Bronze medal – third place	2010 Eindhoven	4×100 m freestyle 34 pts
Representing Wales
Commonwealth Games
Bronze medal – third place	2002 Manchester	100 m freestyle MD
Bronze medal – third place	2006 Melbourne	100 m freestyle MD

David Evan Roberts CBE (born 25 May 1980), is a Welsh swimmer. An eleven-time Paralympic gold medallist, he is one of Great Britain's most successful Paralympians ever.

His achievements put him in 34th place on the all time list of Paralympic Gold Medallists.

== Swimming career ==
Roberts went to Llwyncrwn Primary School and moved on to Bryn Celynnog Comprehensive School. He currently lives in Cardiff. He is a professional disabled swimmer who represents Caerphilly County Swim Squad, Wales and Great Britain. He previously trained at the Swansea High Performance Centre at the Wales National Pool in Swansea but now trains with Caerphilly County Swim Squad with his new coach Peter Key. He was diagnosed with cerebral palsy at age eleven and was encouraged to participate in swimming activities as a form of physical therapy. His International Paralympic Committee (IPC) swimming category is S7 SB7 SM7.

His first represented Wales in competition in Glasgow in 1993. His first major competition for Great Britain was at the 1999 European Disabled swimming Championships in Braunschweig, Germany where he won all four of his races. He competed in his first Paralympic Games in Sydney in the summer of 2000. Here he won an impressive haul of seven medals.

At the 2001 European Disabled Swimming Championships in Stockholm, Sweden, David won five gold medals including a clean sweep of the S7 50 m, 100 m and 400 m freestyle events.

The Manchester 2002 Commonwealth Games saw Elite Athletes with Disabilities (EAD) competing alongside able-bodied athletes at a major competition for the first time. David was the only disabled swimmer from Great Britain to win a medal, taking the bronze in the men's multi disability 100 m freestyle.

Roberts won his first IPC World Swimming Championship medals in Mar Del Plata, Argentina in December 2002. He won three gold medals, one silver and one bronze.

His second experience of Paralympic action came at the Athens 2004 Summer Paralympics. Here David won four golds and one silver. His medals came in the following events:

- Men's 50 m freestyle S7 – Gold
- Men's 100 m freestyle S7 – Gold
- Men's 400 m freestyle S7 – Gold
- Men's 200 m individual medley SM7 – Silver
- Men's 4 × 100 m freestyle relay 34 pts – Gold

His achievements at the 2000 and 2004 Paralympics, alongside his previous successes for Great Britain, earned David an MBE for his services to disabled sport in the Queen's New Years Honours. He received his award from the Queen at Buckingham Palace in March 2005. He also made it onto the shortlist of the 2004 BBC Wales Sports Personality of the Year Award which was won by Dame Tanni Grey-Thompson.

David retained his Commonwealth Games men's multi disability 100 m freestyle bronze medal at the 2006 event held in Melbourne, Australia. At the 2006 IPC World Swimming Championships, held in Durban, South Africa, he won four gold, 1 silver and a bronze. Included in the medal haul was another clean sweep in the S7 freestyle events.

The first half of 2008 saw David set new world records for the S7 50 m, 100 m, 200 m and 400 m freestyle events in the space of six weeks. He retained his S7 50 m freestyle World record off Great Britain rival Matthew Walker in April at the British Swimming Championships in Sheffield setting a new time of 27.67. At the same event he lowered his S7 100 m freestyle world record to a new time of 1:00.34.

He set a new S7 200 m world record of 2:18.86 at the German Open Championships in May 2008. For the first time in his career he finally took the S7 400 m freestyle world record, which had been held by Dean Booth from New Zealand for eight years previously, at the British International Swimming Championships held in Sheffield in April, recording a time of 4:49.12.

He achieved selection for his third consecutive Paralympics in May 2008 by being named as part of the squad to attend the Beijing Paralympics.

He won four gold medals at the Beijing 2008 Paralympic Games taking the S7 50 m, 100 m and 400 m freestyle events and was part of the gold medal-winning Great Britain 34 point 4×100 m freestyle relay team that broke the world record by seven seconds. Other members of the team were Graham Edmunds, Robert Welbourn and Matthew Walker.

To show support for his, at the time, coach Billy Pye, who supports Cardiff City Roberts performed The Ayatollah in front of the Western Mail reporters to celebrate winning his 11th gold medal. David is a keen supporter of Wrexham FC and regularly attends games as a supporter of Welsh rugby team, Bridgend Ravens. In winning this 11th gold, David Roberts equalled Dame Tanni Grey-Thompson's record as being Wales and Britain's most successful Paralympian.

After winning four golds in the Beijing 2008 Paralympics, David was selected to carry out the British flag at the closing ceremony.

He appeared as a guest on an episode of the popular British TV sports quiz Question of Sport which aired on Friday 24 October 2008 on BBC One. He took a seat alongside regular team captain Matt Dawson and guest teammate, English cricketer Marcus Trescothick.

He was nominated for the BBC Wales Sports Personality of the Year Awards for the second time in December 2008.

Already a Member of the Order of the British Empire (MBE), Roberts was appointed Commander of the Order of the British Empire (CBE) in the 2009 New Year Honours for services to disabled sport. He received his CBE off Princess Anne in a ceremony held at Buckingham Palace on Wednesday 24 June 2009.

David was inducted into the Welsh Sports Hall of Fame along with J.J. Williams and Clive Sullivan at a ceremony held in Cardiff on 5 June 2009.

Penn Pharmaceuticals were the first corporate sponsor of David, from 2008 to date

At the start of 2010, David made the move from the Swansea High Performance Centre to Caerphilly County Swim Squad and a new coach in Peter Key. On 4 March 2010 David was chosen to be a patron of the Jaguar Sports Academy. In August 2010 he once again represented Britain at the IPC World Swimming Championships, which were held in Eindhoven in the Netherlands. Despite only recently returning to action after a period of prolonged injury and illness, he still managed to retain his S7 100m Freestyle crown, alongside picking up a silver and two bronze medals. He was selected and competed for Wales at the Delhi 2010 Commonwealth Games, coming 4th in the S7 100m Freestyle, an event which saw him swim against competitors a class higher than his own.

In April 2012 Roberts was omitted from the GB Swimming Team for the Paralympics at London 2012 because he did not meet his qualifying times due to having pneumonia three weeks before the trials.

He proposed to his long-term partner Agata Jankowska on a holiday trip to New York in October 2010. On 11 March he was invited to address the Human Rights Council in Geneva on London 2012 and the rights of people with disabilities.

He was selected to carry the Paralympic flame through Tower Hamlets on 29 August at 1:07pm.

== See also ==
- List of IPC world records in swimming
- Athletes with most gold medals in one event at the Paralympic Games
