= John Petersson =

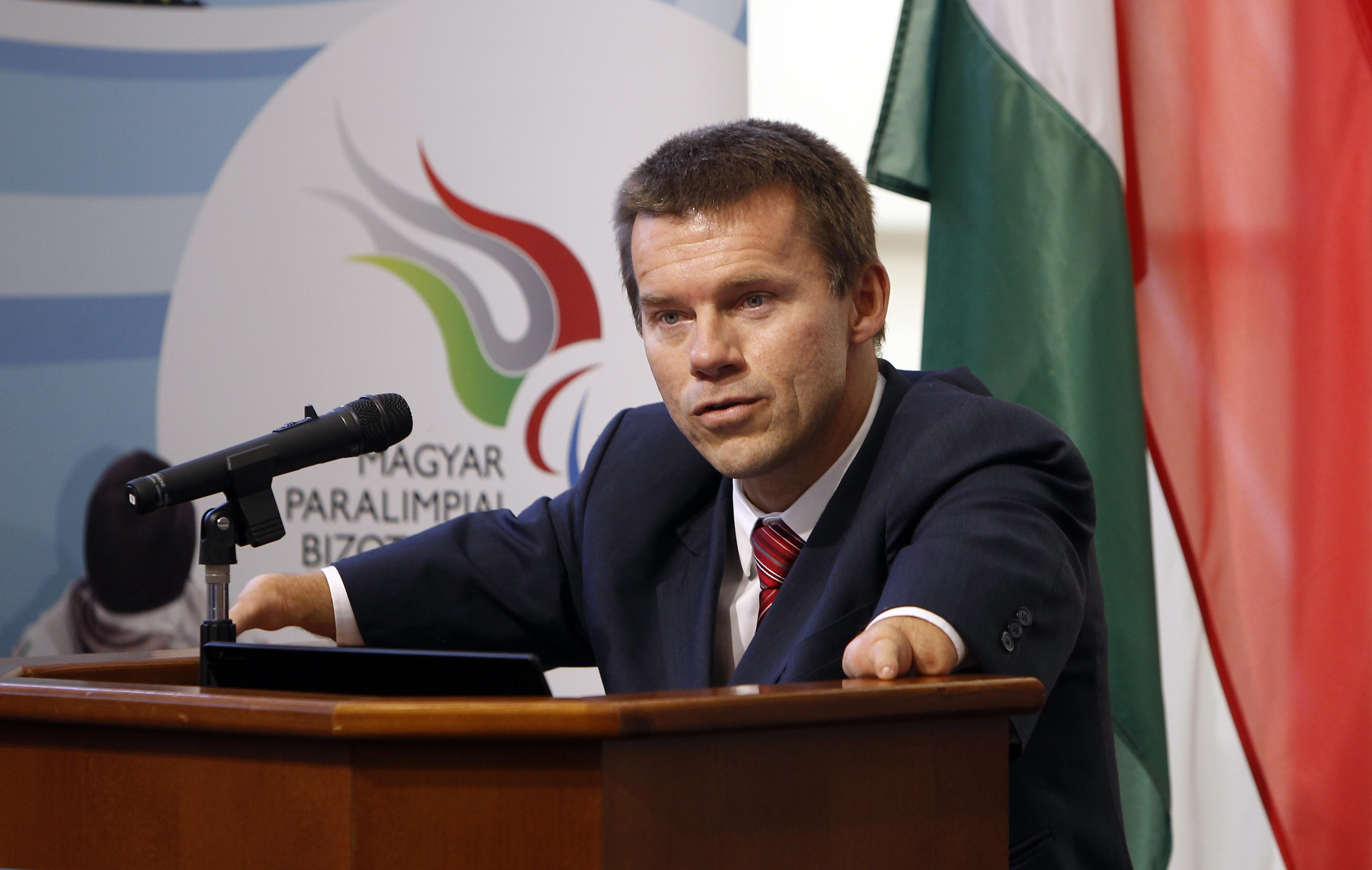
John Petersson in 2015

John Petersson (born 22 January 1970) is president of the European Paralympic Committee and a former swimmer from Denmark. He is also one of the 12 members of the International Paralympic Committee and he has been a member of the Danish Handicap-Federal Board of Directors since 2000. Petersson is an accountant who studied at Copenhagen Business School.

== Paralympics career ==
John Petersson participated for the first time at the 1984 Paralympic Games and ended his career at the 2000 Paralympic Games in Sydney. It was during the games in 1988, that he by a journalist got nicknamed 'Piskeriset', which has kept by his side. John Petersson won a total of fifteen Paralympic medals in his career.

- 5 Paralympic Games (1984–2000): 6 gold, 2 silver, 7 bronze, 6 world records
- 3 World Championships (1986–1998): 4 gold, 3 silver, 2 bronze, 4 world records
- 1 European Championships (1995): 2 gold, 1 silver, 1 bronze

== Awards ==
- 2009: Danish Sports Award for People with an impairment by the Danish Minister of Culture and Sport.

== Personal life ==
Petersson is married and has two children.
