= Giles Long =

British swimmer, public speaker, TV presenter & commentator

Medal record

Swimming (S8), (SM8)

Representing Great Britain

Paralympic Games
Gold medal – first place	1996 Atlanta	100 m Butterfly PR
Gold medal – first place	2000 Sydney	100 m Butterfly WR
Gold medal – first place	2000 Sydney	4×100 m Freestyle (heats)
Silver medal – second place	1996 Atlanta	4x100 m Medley Relay
Silver medal – second place	2000 Sydney	4×100 m Medley Relay
Bronze medal – third place	1996 Atlanta	200 m Individual Medley
Bronze medal – third place	2004 Athens	100 m Butterfly

IPC World Championships
Gold medal – first place	1994 Malta	100 m Butterfly WR
Silver medal – second place	1994 Malta	4×100 m Freestyle
Silver medal – second place	1998 Christchurch, NZ	100 m Butterfly
Silver medal – second place	2002 Mar Del Plata, Argentina	100 m Butterfly
Bronze medal – third place	1994 Malta	200 m Individual Medley
Bronze medal – third place	1998 Christchurch, NZ	4×100 m Medley Relay
Bronze medal – third place	2002 Mar Del Plata, Argentina	200 m Individual Medley

IPC European Championships
Gold medal – first place	1995 Perpignan, France	100 m Butterfly ER
Gold medal – first place	1999 Braunsweig, Germany	100 m Butterfly ER
Gold medal – first place	1999 Braunsweig, Germany	200 m Individual Medley ER
Gold medal – first place	2001 Stockholm, Sweden	100 m Butterfly
Silver medal – second place	1995 Perpignan, France	200 m Individual Medley
Silver medal – second place	2001 Stockholm, Sweden	200 m Individual Medley

Giles Bruce Long MBE (born 9 July 1976, Harold Wood, London), is a retired British swimmer, public speaker, TV presenter & commentator. He is also the inventor of LEXI.

== Swimmer ==
Long's international swimming career highlight was winning gold in the S8 100 m Butterfly in a new world-record time at the Sydney 2000 Paralympics.

The 1994 World Championships was his first major international. He won gold in the S8 100 m butterfly, breaking the world record in the process. He represented Great Britain at the 1996 Summer Paralympics in Atlanta, and won three medals, including gold in the 100 m butterfly. He competed again at the 2000 Summer Paralympics in Sydney, where he won two gold medals and one silver, and set a new world record in the 100 m butterfly. He also took part in the 2004 Summer Paralympics in Athens, winning bronze in the S8 100 m Butterfly.

In the 2006 New Year Honours, Long was appointed a Member of the Order of the British Empire (MBE) for services to disabled sport.

He announced his retirement from competitive swimming in 2007.

On 5 July 2012 he was a Torchbearer as part of the Olympic Torch Relay. He was the first leg of Day 48 and started on top of Norwich Castle. He then carried the torch down inside the castle and round the walls before passing the flame on as it travelled towards Ipswich.

== Early life ==
Long grew up in Braintree, Essex in the UK. He enjoyed being in the water and joined Braintree & Bocking Swimming Club in 1983 aged seven.

At the age of 13 he was diagnosed with an Osteosarcoma, a form of bone cancer, in his right Humerus (the bone which connects shoulder to elbow). He underwent chemotherapy at University College Hospital, London and had an operation to insert a full humeral prosthetic replacement (a metal bone) into his right arm at the Royal National Orthopaedic Hospital (RNOH), Stanmore. After the treatment and operation Long resumed swimming and returned to able-bodied competition though by now swimming with just his left arm.

Life returned to relative normality with a return to school but in late 1991 the disease returned with a serious infection during which Long nearly died. He was admitted to the now demolished Middlesex Hospital, London and was treated, again with chemotherapy, in the UK's first Teenage Cancer Trust unit. He was operated on by Mr Cannon at the RNOH and then spent six weeks in isolation to treat the infection. He was then operated on again before finishing his chemotherapy. The final part of the treatment was a course of Radiotherapy at Middlesex Hospital.

== Education ==
Long read Geology at the University of Leeds and graduated with BSc 2:1 with honours in 1997.

== Television & Radio ==
Giles was part of the UK Channel 4 presenting and commentary team for the London 2012 Paralympics. His contribution was very well received. Clive James in the Daily Telegraph wrote "Giles Long, himself three times a Paralympics swimming gold medallist, who was so thorough in explaining the requirements of swimming with a damaged body that you learned a lot about swimming in general."

On the lead up to the 2012 Paralympics he presented the IPC World Swimming Championships in 2010 (both highlights and live web broadcast), BT Paralympic World Cup live coverage in 2011, the highlights of the IPC European Wheelchair Fencing Championships and packages for That Paralympic Show.

In 2010 and 2011 he worked on the sports desk at Sky News and for the BBC News Channel.

Earlier in his career he had untaken work placements with BBC Radio 1 on the Mark & Lard Show, BBC Radio 5 Live, BBC Radio Manchester.

== LEXI ==
Long is the inventor of LEXI a groundbreaking graphics system that, for the first time, effectively explained the confusing system of classification in Paralympic sports on television. It was first used by London 2012 host broadcaster Channel 4 in the UK. It was also sub-licensed to ABC for use in Australia.

On 28 November 2012 he was awarded an honorary doctorate by the University of East London for the invention of LEXI and his contribution to the coverage of the London 2012 Paralympic Games.

Lexicon Decoder is the global rights holder for LEXI.

== Writer & Author ==
Giles wrote Changing to Win, an autobiography and motivational book, which was first published by Piatkus (now part of Little, Brown and Company) in October 2008. It was then reprinted in April 2010.

He wrote briefly for the Daily Telegraph in 2004 describing the emotional roller-coaster of competing at the Athens 2004 Paralympic Games. He also wrote a column in The Swimming Times from May 2008 to July 2009.

== Awards ==
On 12 May 2013 he was part of the Channel 4 team that won at the British Academy of Film and Television Arts award (BAFTA) in the Sport & Best Live Event category.
