= Swimming at the 1984 Summer Paralympics =

Swimming at the VII Paralympic Games
- Paralympic Swimming

Paralympic symbol (1988-1994)

Swimming at the 1984 Summer Paralympics consisted of 345 events.

== Medal table ==
Rank	Nation	Gold	Silver	Bronze	Total
1	Netherlands (NED)	41	34	14	89
2	United States (USA)	38	30	43	111
3	France (FRA)	36	23	21	80
4	Canada (CAN)	34	30	32	96
5	Sweden (SWE)	32	22	21	75
6	Poland (POL)	27	17	8	52
7	Great Britain (GBR)	26	33	39	98
8	West Germany (FRG)	24	30	18	72
9	Australia (AUS)	19	32	24	75
10	Spain (ESP)	19	8	9	36
11	Norway (NOR)	16	12	17	45
12	Hungary (HUN)	10	5	1	16
13	Denmark (DEN)	9	2	10	21
14	Israel (ISR)	3	12	6	21
15	Italy (ITA)	3	8	5	16
16	Ireland (IRL)	3	2	2	7
17	Austria (AUT)	2	2	0	4
18	Brazil (BRA)	1	5	1	7
19	Finland (FIN)	1	3	5	9
20	New Zealand (NZL)	1	2	1	4
21	Luxembourg (LUX)	1	2	0	3
22	Yugoslavia (YUG)	1	1	4	6
23	China (CHN)	0	6	4	10
24	Belgium (BEL)	0	3	3	6
25	Iceland (ISL)	0	2	5	7
26	Kuwait (KUW)	0	1	2	3
27	Switzerland (SUI)	0	1	1	2
28	Japan (JPN)	0	0	2	2
29	Egypt (EGY)	0	0	1	1
29	Hong Kong (HKG)	0	0	1	1
29	Trinidad and Tobago (TTO)	0	0	1	1
Totals (31 entries)		347	328	301	976

=== Participating nations ===
- Australia (29)
- Austria (4)
- Belgium (3)
- Brazil (5)
- Canada (53)
- China (15)
- Denmark (15)
- Ecuador (1)
- Egypt (3)
- Faroe Islands (3)
- Finland (7)
- France (29)
- Great Britain (70)
- Guatemala (2)
- Hong Kong (2)
- Hungary (9)
- Iceland (7)
- India (2)
- Indonesia (1)
- Ireland (5)
- Israel (13)
- Japan (7)
- Kenya (2)
- Kuwait (5)
- Luxembourg (1)
- Malta (1)
- Mexico (8)
- Netherlands (27)
- New Zealand (1)
- Norway (23)
- Poland (14)
- Spain (20)
- Sweden (23)
- Switzerland (3)
- Thailand (2)
- Trinidad and Tobago (4)
- United States (63)
- Venezuela (1)
- West Germany (35)
- Yugoslavia (7)
- Zimbabwe (1)

== Medal summary ==
=== Men's events ===
Event	Gold	Silver	Bronze
25 m backstroke 1A	Mike Kenny; Great Britain	Pekka Kantola; Finland	H. Tietze; West Germany
25 m backstroke 1B	Kenneth Cairns; Great Britain	Eero Maki; Finland	Amedeo Cirioni; Italy
25 m backstroke 1C	Krzysztof Sleczka; Poland	D. Goodman; United States	Robert Staddon; Australia
25 m backstroke C3	Didier Cougouille; France	Martin Weber; West Germany	Brendan Crean; Ireland
25 m backstroke C6	Henri Kaude; Luxembourg	William Maxwell McKay; Great Britain	J. Murray; Great Britain
25 m backstroke L1	John Petersson; Denmark	Pascal Jacquot; France	Lauritz Ellefsen; Norway
25 m backstroke L2	Michel Landra; France	Mickey Macri; Canada	
25 m breaststroke 1A	Mike Kenny; Great Britain	H. Tietze; West Germany	Pekka Kantola; Finland
25 m breaststroke 1B	Kenneth Cairns; Great Britain	Tadeusz Zabrzeski; Poland	Rick Mason; United States
25 m breaststroke 1C	Krzysztof Sleczka; Poland		D. Goodman; United States
25 m breaststroke 1C	Luca Pancalli; Italy		D. Goodman; United States
25 m butterfly 1B	S. Green; United States	H. Tietze; West Germany	Rick Mason; United States
25 m butterfly 1C	Luca Pancalli; Italy	J. Opstaele; Belgium	D. Goodman; United States
25 m butterfly 2	Marek Szpojnarowicz; Poland	Roby Crichton; New Zealand	Ernesto Giussani; Italy
25 m butterfly 3	Arkadiusz Pawlowski; Poland	Miroslaw Owczarek; Poland	Ian Jaquiss; United States
25 m freestyle 1A	Mike Kenny; Great Britain	H. Tietze; West Germany	Pekka Kantola; Finland
25 m freestyle 1B	Kenneth Cairns; Great Britain	S. Green; United States	Rick Mason; United States
25 m freestyle 1C	Luca Pancalli; Italy	Krzysztof Sleczka; Poland	D. Goodman; United States
25 m freestyle C2	Ari Jonkari; Finland	Mark Chard; Great Britain	Bill Reilly; United States
25 m freestyle C3	Didier Cougouille; France		
25 m freestyle C6	Robert Walden; Australia	Henri Kaude; Luxembourg	Bob Scrace; Canada
25 m freestyle L1	John Petersson; Denmark	Pascal Jacquot; France	Bernt Petersson; Sweden
25 m freestyle L2	Michel Landra; France	Mickey Macri; Canada	
25 m freestyle with aids C1	Rick Resa; United States	Brian Kelly; Canada	Russell Cecchini; Canada
25 m freestyle with aids C2	Mike Bowen; United States	Steven Varden; Great Britain	Ken Thomas; Canada
50 m backstroke 2	Marek Szpojnarowicz; Poland	Ernesto Giussani; Italy	Pascal Cornelis; Belgium
50 m backstroke 3	Miroslaw Owczarek; Poland	Mohamed Ait Aissa; France	Joseph Wengier; Israel
50 m backstroke A5	Bogdan Kozon; Poland	Andreas Brand; West Germany	David Foppolo; France
50 m backstroke A9	Frits Hildebrandt; Netherlands	Tom Nordtvedt; Norway	Roko Mikelin; Yugoslavia
50 m backstroke C4	Robin Surgeoner; Great Britain	Jorn Ole Jensen; Denmark	Joe Higgins; Canada
50 m backstroke C5	Martin Mansell; Great Britain	Stephan Dahl; Denmark	Michael Quickert; West Germany
50 m backstroke C7	Eric Pittens; Netherlands	Regis Mettraux; Switzerland	Chris Hampshire; Great Britain
50 m backstroke C8	Bill Parry; Canada	Charles Mowery; United States	
50 m backstroke L3	Andras Toth; Hungary	Francisco Flores; Spain	Thierry Legloanic; France
50 m breaststroke 2	Chris Hallam; Great Britain	Winfried Sigg; West Germany	Ernesto Giussani; Italy
50 m breaststroke 3	Arkadiusz Pawlowski; Poland	Joseph Wengier; Israel	Ian Jaquiss; United States
50 m breaststroke A5	Bogdan Kozon; Poland	Ronald West; Great Britain	Andreas Brand; West Germany
50 m breaststroke A9	Gerrie de Hoop; Netherlands	Frits Hildebrandt; Netherlands	Tom Nordtvedt; Norway
50 m breaststroke B1	Rene Waayer; Netherlands	Keith Zoller; United States	Thomas Wetche; Denmark
50 m breaststroke B2	Eric Ghysel; France	Miqiang Li; China	Jim Visser; Canada
50 m breaststroke B3	Robert Hatcher; United States	Kingsley Bugarin; Australia	Stephen Cheung; Hong Kong
50 m breaststroke C8	Charles Mowery; United States	Bill Parry; Canada	Rick Gronman; Canada
50 m breaststroke L3	Francisco Flores; Spain	Peter Williams; Great Britain	Mogens Christensen; Denmark
50 m butterfly 4	Anders Olsson; Sweden	Shlomo Pinto; Israel	P. Wiedeman; West Germany
50 m butterfly C8	Karl Mayr; Austria	Bill Parry; Canada	
50 m freestyle 2	Roby Crichton; New Zealand	Ernesto Giussani; Italy	Pascal Cornelis; Belgium
50 m freestyle 3	Arkadiusz Pawlowski; Poland	Miroslaw Owczarek; Poland	Joseph Wengier; Israel
50 m freestyle B1	Rodney Hyder; United States	Ken Booth; Canada	Alastair Fairweather; Great Britain
50 m freestyle B2	Eric Ghysel; France	Todd Hodgin; United States	Chris Hogans; United States
50 m freestyle B3	Robert Hatcher; United States	Kingsley Bugarin; Australia	Scott Smith; Great Britain
50 m freestyle C3	Didier Cougouille; France	Martin Weber; West Germany	
50 m freestyle C4	Robin Surgeoner; Great Britain	Joe Higgins; Canada	Steve Marossy; United States
50 m freestyle C5	Stephan Dahl; Denmark	Per Ove Alsethaug; Norway	Anders Christensen; Denmark
50 m freestyle C6	Robert Walden; Australia	Henri Kaude; Luxembourg	Bob Scrace; Canada
50 m freestyle C7	Stig Osland; Norway	Sergio Calega; Italy	Eric Pittens; Netherlands
50 m freestyle C8	Markus Schnitzer; West Germany	Ronald Roselle; Netherlands	Bill Parry; Canada
50 m freestyle L3	Francisco Flores; Spain	Gordon Crowe; Great Britain	Bill Lehr; United States
100 m backstroke 4	Gunnar Nilsson; Sweden	Shlomo Pinto; Israel	J. Stanfield; Canada
100 m backstroke 5	G. Betega; France	Marcelo Amorim; Brazil	H, Heijnen; Netherlands
100 m backstroke 6	Gerard Dunne; Ireland	Bernard Micorec; France	Naser Eldin Nabil; Egypt
100 m backstroke A1	Streen Rosager; Denmark	Jozef Banfi; Yugoslavia	Wolfgang Goris; West Germany
100 m backstroke A2	Bernd Rubner; West Germany	Jonas Oskarson; Iceland	Anthony Stickland; Great Britain
100 m backstroke A3	Erling Trondsen; Norway	Xian Zhang; China	Dave Reynolds; United States
100 m backstroke A4	Gary Simpson; Canada	Gary Gudgeon; Australia	Johan Mosterd; Netherlands
100 m backstroke A6	Karl Schroeder; West Germany	Baruch Peretzman; Israel	Sauro Nicolini; Italy
100 m backstroke A7	Heinz Barnbeck; West Germany	Andrzej Wojciechowski; Poland	Jiliang Shen; China
100 m backstroke A8	Andre van Buiten; Netherlands	Philip Mindorf; Canada	Janusz Kozak; Poland
100 m backstroke B1	Hans Sjogren; Sweden	Greg Thompson; Canada	James Muirhead; Great Britain
100 m backstroke B2	Per Andersson; Sweden	Todd Hodgin; United States	Idar Hunstad; Norway
100 m backstroke B3	Carsten Othmar; West Germany	Michael Edgson; Canada	Brian Hudson; United States
100 m backstroke C4	Jorn Ole Jensen; Denmark	Kare Adler; Norway	Claus Petersen; Denmark
100 m backstroke C5	Stephan Dahl; Denmark	Martin Mansell; Great Britain	Anders Christensen; Denmark
100 m backstroke C7	Eric Pittens; Netherlands	Chris Hampshire; Great Britain	Regis Mettraux; Switzerland
100 m backstroke C8	Markus Schnitzer; West Germany	Ronald Roselle; Netherlands	
100 m backstroke L4	Eugenio Jimenez; Spain	Michael Lapp; West Germany	Andrew Gilbert; Great Britain
100 m backstroke L5	Alberto Gomez; Spain	Holger Woelk; West Germany	Jorge Gotzens; Spain
100 m backstroke L6	Ferenc Stettner; Hungary	Kevin McGee; Great Britain	Gareth Thomas; Great Britain
100 m breaststroke 4	P. Wiedeman; West Germany	Anders Olsson; Sweden	J. Stanfield; Canada
100 m breaststroke 5	G. Betega; France	Marcelo Amorim; Brazil	H. Heijnen; Netherlands
100 m breaststroke 6	Tomas Hainey; Canada	Andrzej Jezierski; Poland	Marek Wegrzyn; Poland
100 m breaststroke A1	Geza Dukai; Hungary	Wolfgang Goris; West Germany	Jozef Banfi; Yugoslavia
100 m breaststroke A2	Jan Chryczyk; Poland	Erwin Klabecek; Austria	Dennis Quenneville; Canada
100 m breaststroke A3	Erling Trondsen; Norway	Xian Zhang; China	Etsuo Inoue; Japan
100 m breaststroke A4	Gary Gudgeon; Australia	Grzegorz Biela; Poland	Sven Eryd; Sweden
100 m breaststroke A6	Karl Schroeder; West Germany	Baruch Peretzman; Israel	Heikki Miettinen; Finland
100 m breaststroke A8	Greg Hammond; Australia	Andre van Buiten; Netherlands	Janusz Kozak; Poland
100 m breaststroke B1	Lars-Ove Nederman; Sweden	Timothy McIsaac; Canada	Hans Anton Aalien; Norway
100 m breaststroke B2	Anders Eriksson; Sweden	Bruce Vandermolen; Canada	
100 m breaststroke B3	Mark Hoyle; Canada	Brian Hudson; United States	Carsten Othmar; West Germany
100 m breaststroke C8	Ronald Roselle; Netherlands	Hans Pauwels; Belgium	Markus Schnitzer; West Germany
100 m breaststroke L4	Eric Fleury; France	Juan Castane; Spain	Michael Lapp; West Germany
100 m breaststroke L5	Theo van der Meijden; Netherlands	Alberto Gomez; Spain	Roberto Garcia; Spain
100 m breaststroke L6	Attila Jeszenszky; Hungary	Tom Bruer; Norway	Malcom Chalmers; Australia
100 m butterfly 5	G. Betega; France	Nezar Ahmad; Kuwait	Yousuf Naser; Kuwait
100 m butterfly 6	Gerard Dunne; Ireland	Tomas Hainey; Canada	Uri Bergman; Israel
100 m butterfly A1	Geza Dukai; Hungary	Wolfgang Goris; West Germany	Qianming Cao; China
100 m butterfly A2	Peter Aldous; Great Britain	Jan Chryczyk; Poland	David Griffin; Australia
100 m butterfly A3	Erling Trondsen; Norway	Xian Zhang; China	
100 m butterfly A4	Gary Gudgeon; Australia	Ron Bolotin; Israel	Sven Eryd; Sweden
100 m butterfly A8	Andre van Buiten; Netherlands	Greg Hammond; Australia	Janusz Kozak; Poland
100 m butterfly B1	James Muirhead; Great Britain	Hans Sjogren; Sweden	Ken Booth; Canada
100 m butterfly B2	John Morgan; United States	Lee Grenon; Canada	Per Andersson; Sweden
100 m butterfly B3	Michael Edgson; Canada	Craig Blackburn; Australia	Brian Hudson; United States
100 m butterfly L4	Alberto Jofre; Spain	Marcel Poulisse; Netherlands	Eric Fleury; France
100 m butterfly L5	Claude Dupin; France	Theo van der Meijden; Netherlands	Alberto Gomez; Spain
100 m butterfly L6	Attila Jeszenszky; Hungary	Malcom Chalmers; Australia	Dieter Durchdewald; West Germany
100 m freestyle 1A	Mike Kenny; Great Britain	J. P. Sandbraaten; Norway	Phillip Tracey; Australia
100 m freestyle 1B	Kenneth Cairns; Great Britain	Tadeusz Zabrzeski; Poland	C. Trog; France
100 m freestyle 1C	Krzysztof Sleczka; Poland	Luca Pancalli; Italy	Robert Staddon; Australia
100 m freestyle 4	Anders Olsson; Sweden	Shlomo Pinto; Israel	P. Wiedeman; West Germany
100 m freestyle 5	Wayne Ryding; Australia	H. Heijnen; Netherlands	Marcelo Amorim; Brazil
100 m freestyle 6	Tomas Hainey; Canada		Gerard Dunne; Ireland
100 m freestyle 6	Uri Bergman; Israel		Gerard Dunne; Ireland
100 m freestyle A1	Streen Rosager; Denmark	Wolfgang Goris; West Germany	Geza Dukai; Hungary
100 m freestyle A2	Bernd Rubner; West Germany	Holger Gruber; West Germany	Gerard van Vliet; Netherlands
100 m freestyle A3	Erling Trondsen; Norway	Dave Reynolds; United States	Etsuo Inoue; Japan
100 m freestyle A4	Sven Eryd; Sweden	Ron Bolotin; Israel	Mark Ludbrook; Canada
100 m freestyle A5	Bogdan Kozon; Poland	David Foppolo; France	Andreas Brand; West Germany
100 m freestyle A6	Karl Schroeder; West Germany	Sauro Nicolini; Italy	Baruch Peretzman; Israel
100 m freestyle A7	Andrzej Wojciechowski; Poland	Heinz Barnbeck; West Germany	Jiliang Shen; China
100 m freestyle A8	Greg Hammond; Australia	Andre van Buiten; Netherlands	Hanoch Budin; Israel
100 m freestyle A9	Frits Hildebrandt; Netherlands	Gerrie de Hoop; Netherlands	Roko Mikelin; Yugoslavia
100 m freestyle B1	Hans Sjogren; Sweden	James Muirhead; Great Britain	Lars-Ove Nederman; Sweden
100 m freestyle B2	John Morgan; United States	Per Andersson; Sweden	Eric Ghysel; France
100 m freestyle B3	Carsten Othmar; West Germany	Craig Blackburn; Australia	
100 m freestyle B3	Carsten Othmar; West Germany	Richard Ropka; United States	
100 m freestyle C4	Robin Surgeoner; Great Britain	Joe Higgins; Canada	Steve Marossy; United States
100 m freestyle C5	Stephan Dahl; Denmark	Martin Mansell; Great Britain	Anders Christensen; Denmark
100 m freestyle C6	Robert Walden; Australia		
100 m freestyle C7	Stig Osland; Norway	Sergio Calega; Italy	Alexander Wilczoch; Sweden
100 m freestyle C8	Ronald Roselle; Netherlands	Markus Schnitzer; West Germany	Hans Pauwels; Belgium
100 m freestyle L4	Marcel Poulisse; Netherlands	Alberto Jofre; Spain	Andrew Gilbert; Great Britain
100 m freestyle L5	Alberto Gomez; Spain	Gyorgy Tory; Hungary	Theo van der Meijden; Netherlands
100 m freestyle L6	Malcom Chalmers; Australia	Dieter Durchdewald; West Germany	Tom Bruer; Norway
150 m individual medley A5	Bogdan Kozon; Poland	David Foppolo; France	Andreas Brand; West Germany
150 m individual medley A9	Gerrie de Hoop; Netherlands	Frits Hildebrandt; Netherlands	Tom Nordtvedt; Norway
200 m freestyle 2	Marek Szpojnarowicz; Poland	Roby Crichton; New Zealand	Jean Marc Durieux; France
200 m freestyle 3	Arkadiusz Pawlowski; Poland	Miroslaw Owczarek; Poland	Mohamed Ait Aissa; France
200 m freestyle C4	Robin Surgeoner; Great Britain	Joe Higgins; Canada	Kare Adler; Norway
200 m freestyle C5	Stephan Dahl; Denmark	Martin Mansell; Great Britain	Anders Christensen; Denmark
200 m freestyle C6	Robert Walden; Australia		
200 m freestyle C7	Stig Osland; Norway	Eric Pittens; Netherlands	Alexander Wilczoch; Sweden
200 m freestyle C8	Karl Mayr; Austria		
200 m individual medley A1	Geza Dukai; Hungary	Wolfgang Goris; West Germany	Qianming Cao; China
200 m individual medley A2	Jan Chryczyk; Poland	Anthony Stickland; Great Britain	Gerard van Vliet; Netherlands
200 m individual medley A3	Erling Trondsen; Norway	Xian Zhang; China	Dave Reynolds; United States
200 m individual medley A4	Gary Gudgeon; Australia	Sven Eryd; Sweden	Gary Simpson; Canada
200 m individual medley A6	Karl Schroeder; West Germany	Baruch Peretzman; Israel	Sauro Nicolini; Italy
200 m individual medley A7	Andrzej Wojciechowski; Poland	Heinz Barnbeck; West Germany	
200 m individual medley A8	Andre van Buiten; Netherlands	Greg Hammond; Australia	Janusz Kozak; Poland
200 m individual medley B1	Hans Sjogren; Sweden	Timothy McIsaac; Canada	James Muirhead; Great Britain
200 m individual medley B2	John Morgan; United States	Per Andersson; Sweden	Eric Ghysel; France
200 m individual medley B3	Michael Edgson; Canada	Carsten Othmar; West Germany	Brian Hudson; United States
200 m individual medley L4	Juan Castane; Spain	Marcel Poulisse; Netherlands	Eric Fleury; France
200 m individual medley L5	Claude Dupin; France	Gyorgy Tory; Hungary	Roberto Garcia; Spain
200 m individual medley L6	Attila Jeszenszky; Hungary	Ferenc Stettner; Hungary	Malcom Chalmers; Australia
400 m breaststroke B1	Timothy McIsaac; Canada	Lars-Ove Nederman; Sweden	Rodney Hyder; United States
400 m breaststroke B2	Anders Eriksson; Sweden	Miqiang Li; China	Jim Visser; Canada
400 m breaststroke B3	Mark Hoyle; Canada	Brian Hudson; United States	Kingsley Bugarin; Australia
400 m freestyle 4	Shlomo Pinto; Israel	Gunnar Nilsson; Sweden	
400 m freestyle 5	G. Betega; France	Wayne Ryding; Australia	H. Heijnen; Netherlands
400 m freestyle 6	Tomas Hainey; Canada	Gerard Dunne; Ireland	Bernard Micorec; France
400 m freestyle A2	Bernd Rubner; West Germany	Dennis Quenneville; Canada	Jan Chryczyk; Poland
400 m freestyle A4	Gary Gudgeon; Australia	Sven Eryd; Sweden	Ron Bolotin; Israel
400 m freestyle B1	Hans Sjogren; Sweden	Timothy McIsaac; Canada	James Muirhead; Great Britain
400 m freestyle B2	John Morgan; United States	Lee Grenon; Canada	Anders Eriksson; Sweden
400 m freestyle B3	Carsten Othmar; West Germany	Craig Blackburn; Australia	Mark Hoyle; Canada
400 m individual medley B1	Timothy McIsaac; Canada	Scott Herron; Canada	Mark Heaphy; United States
400 m individual medley B2	John Morgan; United States	Per Andersson; Sweden	Lee Grenon; Canada
400 m individual medley B3	Michael Edgson; Canada	Robert Hatcher; United States	Arne Pedersen; Denmark
3×25 m freestyle relay 1A–1C	West Germany (FRG)	Great Britain (GBR); Kenneth Cairns; Chris Davies; Mike Kenny	Australia (AUS)
3×25 m individual medley 1B	Mike Kenny; Great Britain	Kenneth Cairns; Great Britain	Tadeusz Zabrzeski; Poland
3×25 m individual medley 1C	Krzysztof Sleczka; Poland	Luca Pancalli; Italy	D. Goodman; United States
4×25 m individual medley 2	Marek Szpojnarowicz; Poland	Ernesto Giussani; Italy	Roby Crichton; New Zealand
4×25 m individual medley 3	Arkadiusz Pawlowski; Poland	Joseph Wengier; Israel	W. Stroet; Netherlands
3×50 m individual medley C8	Ronald Roselle; Netherlands	Hans Pauwels; Belgium	
3×50 m medley relay 2–4	Israel (ISR): Joseph Wengier; Shlomo Pinto; Assaf Agmon	Poland (POL)	New Zealand (NZL)
4×50 m freestyle relay 2–6	Poland (POL)	Israel (ISR): Uri Bergman; Joseph Wengier; Shlomo Pinto; Assaf Agmon	France (FRA)
4×50 m freestyle relay A1–A9	Yugoslavia (YUG)	West Germany (FRG)	
4×50 m freestyle relay C1–C8	Great Britain (GBR)	Austria (AUT)	Canada (CAN)
4×50 m freestyle relay L1–L6	Spain (ESP)	Great Britain (GBR)	France (FRA)
4×50 m individual medley 4	Anders Olsson; Sweden	Shlomo Pinto; Israel	P. Wiedeman; West Germany
4×50 m individual medley 5	G. Betega; France	Marcelo Amorim; Brazil	Yousuf Naser; Kuwait
4×50 m individual medley 6	Tomas Hainey; Canada	Andrzej Jezierski; Poland	Bernard Micorec; France
4×50 m medley relay A1–A9	West Germany (FRG)		
4×50 m medley relay L1–L6	Hungary (HUN); Attila Jeszenszky; Laszlo Palinkas; Ferenc Stettner; Gyorgy Tory	Spain (ESP)	Great Britain (GBR)
4 × 100 m freestyle relay A1–A9	West Germany (FRG)	Australia (AUS)	Canada (CAN)
4 × 100 m freestyle relay B1–B3	United States (USA)	Canada (CAN)	Sweden (SWE)
4 × 100 m medley relay 1A–6	France (FRA)	West Germany (FRG)	Poland (POL)
4 × 100 m medley relay A1–A9	Australia (AUS)	Canada (CAN)	West Germany (FRG)
4 × 100 m medley relay B1–B3	Canada (CAN)	United States (USA)	Sweden (SWE)

=== Women's events ===
Event	Gold	Silver	Bronze
25 m backstroke 1B	S. Bonisch; West Germany	M. Gustafson; Canada	Isabel Barr; Great Britain
25 m backstroke 1C	Kerstin Eriksson; Sweden	M. Klaeth; Norway	
25 m backstroke C3	Beatrice Pierre; France	Sigrun Petursdottir; Iceland	Violette Spoka; France
25 m backstroke C6	Morna Cloonan; Ireland	Helene Binet; France	Susan Chick; Canada
25 m backstroke L1	Anne-Lie Osterstrom; Sweden	Tara Flood; Great Britain	Lisa Barker; Great Britain
25 m backstroke L2	Annika Ahnell; Sweden	Mary McCann; Great Britain	Mary Lou Baranski; United States
25 m breaststroke 1B	Isabel Barr; Great Britain	S. Bonisch; West Germany	B. Smith; United States
25 m breaststroke 1C	Kerstin Eriksson; Sweden		
25 m butterfly 1B	Isabel Barr; Great Britain	F. Maury; France	B. Smith; United States
25 m butterfly 2	J. Fauche; Canada	S. Abels; Netherlands	D. Weber; West Germany
25 m butterfly 3	Monika Lundborg; Sweden	Malgorzata Adamik; Poland	Ursula King; Australia
25 m freestyle 1B	M. Gustafson; Canada	F. Maury; France	Isabel Barr; Great Britain
25 m freestyle 1C	Kerstin Eriksson; Sweden	M. Klaeth; Norway	
25 m freestyle C2	Diane Wiscombe; Great Britain	Nancy Anderson; United States	
25 m freestyle C3	Beatrice Pierre; France	Wendy Shugol; United States	Sigrun Petursdottir; Iceland
25 m freestyle C6	Susan Chick; Canada	Helene Binet; France	Anna Blake; Great Britain
25 m freestyle L1	Genevieve Payroux; France	Anne-Lie Osterstrom; Sweden	Tara Flood; Great Britain
25 m freestyle L2	Annika Ahnell; Sweden	Mary McCann; Great Britain	Mary Lou Baranski; United States
25 m freestyle with aids C1	Debbie Willows; Canada		
25 m freestyle with aids C2	Valerie Smith; Great Britain	Monica O'Kelly; Ireland	Carol Johnson; Great Britain
50 m backstroke 2	S. Abels; Netherlands	Jose Faucher; Canada	D. Weber; West Germany
50 m backstroke 3	M. Therese Crespo; France	Malgorzata Adamik; Poland	Corinne D'Urzo; France
50 m backstroke A9	Josee Lake; Canada	Jolande van de Zaag; Netherlands	Jennifer Veenboer; Canada
50 m backstroke C5	Jolanda Romero; Netherlands	Sylvie Delplauque; France	Anne Sandberg; Sweden
50 m backstroke C7	Diane Hendriks; Netherlands	Stephanie Proust; France	Beverley Leaper; Great Britain
50 m backstroke C8	Judy Goodrich; Canada	Linda Nilson; United States	Gayle Ginnish; United States
50 m backstroke L3	Petra Schad; West Germany	Teresa Herreras; Spain	Marjolein van Riel; Netherlands
50 m breaststroke 2	Margit Quell; West Germany	D. Weber; West Germany	S. Abels; Netherlands
50 m breaststroke 3	Monika Lundborg; Sweden	D. Smith; Great Britain	A. Geirsdottir; Iceland
50 m breaststroke A9	Josee Lake; Canada	Jolande van de Zaag; Netherlands	Jennifer Veenboer; Canada
50 m breaststroke B1	Janice Burton; Great Britain	Mary Ann Low; Great Britain	Tamara Boccaccio; Canada
50 m breaststroke B2	Jean Witters; United States	Norma Brown; United States	Heather Taylor; Great Britain
50 m breaststroke B3	Marie Vanliere; United States	Tonia McHugh; United States	Kristy Satterfield; United States
50 m breaststroke C8	Ineke Hageraats; Netherlands	Susan Smith; Canada	
50 m breaststroke L3	Teresa Herreras; Spain	Lewis Hotchin; Great Britain	Eva Lundquist; Sweden
50 m butterfly 4	Marcia Bevard; United States	Kerri-Anne Connor; Australia	Bente Gronli; Norway
50 m freestyle 2	Jose Faucher; Canada	S. Abels; Netherlands	D. Weber; West Germany
50 m freestyle 3	Malgorzata Adamik; Poland	Ursula King; Australia	Monika Lundborg; Sweden
50 m freestyle B1	Mary Ann Low; Great Britain	Tamara Boccaccio; Canada	Gunilla Moline; Sweden
50 m freestyle B2	Eva Andersson; Sweden	Norma Brown; United States	Jean Witters; United States
50 m freestyle B3	Lori Johnson; United States	Jane Lawson; Great Britain	Tonia McHugh; United States
50 m freestyle C3	Beatrice Pierre; France	Wendy Shugol; United States	Sigrun Petursdottir; Iceland
50 m freestyle C4	Vibeke Hagen; Norway	Patricia Hennin; Canada	Jane Stidever; Great Britain
50 m freestyle C5	Jolanda Romero; Netherlands	Sylvie Delplauque; France	Martha Johnson; Canada
50 m freestyle C6	Susan Chick; Canada	Helene Binet; France	Anna Blake; Great Britain
50 m freestyle C7	Stephanie Proust; France	Diane Hendriks; Netherlands	Susan Moucha; United States
50 m freestyle C8	Judy Goodrich; Canada	Ineke Hageraats; Netherlands	Brenda Woodcock; Great Britain
50 m freestyle L3	Teresa Herreras; Spain	Petra Schad; West Germany	Irene Hotchin; Great Britain
100 m backstroke 4	Marcia Bevard; United States	Kerri-Anne Connor; Australia	Jenny Orpwood; Great Britain
100 m backstroke 5	P. Delorme; France	Malgorzata Kozlowska; Poland	Sigrid Voth; Canada
100 m backstroke 6	H. Pettersen; Norway	Maria Jussara Matos; Brazil	
100 m backstroke A1	Britta Siegers; West Germany	Cheryl Anderson; United States	Maj Britt Mastad; Norway
100 m backstroke A2	Karen Gesierich; West Germany	Liesbeth Raes; Netherlands	Wendy Mason; Great Britain
100 m backstroke A4	Helena Brunner; Australia	Janet Verkuil; Netherlands	Meredith Evans; Australia
100 m backstroke A6	Annemiek van Duyn; Netherlands	Rosemary Eames; Australia	
100 m backstroke A8	Annelie Ahrenstrand; Sweden	Tracey Lewis; Australia	Isabelle Durandeau; France
100 m backstroke B1	Yvette Michel; Canada	Janice Burton; Great Britain	Eeva Riitta Kukkonen; Finland
100 m backstroke B2	Trischa Zorn; United States	Eva Andersson; Sweden	Therese Donovan; Australia
100 m backstroke B3	Barbara Eiler; United States	Cathy Schmitt; United States	Marie Vanliere; United States
100 m backstroke C4	Henriette de Later; Netherlands	Vibeke Hagen; Norway	Miri Sisso; Israel
100 m backstroke C5	Jolanda Romero; Netherlands	Sylvie Delplauque; France	Anne Sandberg; Sweden
100 m backstroke C7	Diane Hendriks; Netherlands	Stephanie Proust; France	Susan Moucha; United States
100 m backstroke C8	Ineke Hageraats; Netherlands	Judy Goodrich; Canada	Linda Nilson; United States
100 m backstroke L4	Ana Peiro; Spain	Mirjam Sanders; Netherlands	Katarina Jewall; Sweden
100 m backstroke L5	Agnes Beraudias; France	Pilar Jabaloyas; Spain	Petra Heirbaut; Netherlands
100 m backstroke L6	Manuela Aguilera; Spain	Judit Hoffman; Hungary	
100 m breaststroke 4	Marcia Bevard; United States	Jenny Orpwood; Great Britain	Kerri-Anne Connor; Australia
100 m breaststroke 5	S. Jonker; Netherlands	Sigrid Voth; Canada	E. Bergmann; Iceland
100 m breaststroke A1	Cheryl Anderson; United States	Britta Siegers; West Germany	Lene Olesen; Denmark
100 m breaststroke A2	Jan Wilson; United States	Carol Young; Australia	Mona Hovik; Norway
100 m breaststroke A4	Janet Verkuil; Netherlands	Meredith Evans; Australia	Helena Brunner; Australia
100 m breaststroke A6	Rosemary Eames; Australia	Annemiek van Duyn; Netherlands	
100 m breaststroke A8	Isabelle Durandeau; France	Annelie Ahrenstrand; Sweden	Charlotte Hede; Denmark
100 m breaststroke B1	Magdalena Tjernberg; Sweden	Yvette Michel; Canada	Lorraine Robinson; Great Britain
100 m breaststroke B2	Vurah Runyon; United States	Therese Donovan; Australia	Kelly Carroll; Great Britain
100 m breaststroke B3	Gabriella Tjernberg; Sweden	Cathy Schmitt; United States	Helen Bendiksen; Norway
100 m breaststroke C8	Ineke Hageraats; Netherlands		
100 m breaststroke L4	Mirjam Sanders; Netherlands	Maj Berger; Norway	Ana Peiro; Spain
100 m breaststroke L5	Petra Heirbaut; Netherlands	Agnes Beraudias; France	Laura Tramuns; Spain
100 m breaststroke L6	Judit Hoffman; Hungary		
100 m butterfly 5	Malgorzata Kozlowska; Poland		
100 m butterfly 6	H. Pettersen; Norway		
100 m butterfly A2	Liesbeth Raes; Netherlands	Jan Wilson; United States	Carol Young; Australia
100 m butterfly A6	Annemiek van Duyn; Netherlands	Rosemary Eames; Australia	
100 m butterfly A8	Annelie Ahrenstrand; Sweden	Tracey Lewis; Australia	Isabelle Durandeau; France
100 m butterfly B1	Magdalena Tjernberg; Sweden	Eeva Riitta Kukkonen; Finland	Andrea Rossi; Canada
100 m butterfly B2	Trischa Zorn; United States	Eva Andersson; Sweden	Heather Taylor; Great Britain
100 m butterfly B3	Barbara Eiler; United States	Mary-Anne Wallace; Australia	Helen Bendiksen; Norway
100 m butterfly L4	Ana Peiro; Spain	Katarina Jewall; Sweden	Mirjam Sanders; Netherlands
100 m butterfly L5	Agnes Beraudias; France	Petra Heirbaut; Netherlands	Pilar Jabaloyas; Spain
100 m butterfly L6	Immaculada Palencia; Spain		
100 m freestyle 1B	S. Bonisch; West Germany	Isabel Barr; Great Britain	F. Maury; France
100 m freestyle 4	Marcia Bevard; United States	Kerri-Anne Connor; Australia	Jenny Orpwood; Great Britain
100 m freestyle 5	P. Delorme; France	Malgorzata Kozlowska; Poland	Sigrid Voth; Canada
100 m freestyle 6	H. Pettersen; Norway	Maria Jussara Matos; Brazil	
100 m freestyle A1	Britta Siegers; West Germany	Cheryl Anderson; United States	Anne Currie; Australia
100 m freestyle A2	Liesbeth Raes; Netherlands	Karen Gesierich; West Germany	Jan Wilson; United States
100 m freestyle A4	Helena Brunner; Australia	Janet Verkuil; Netherlands	Meredith Evans; Australia
100 m freestyle A6	Annemiek van Duyn; Netherlands	Rosemary Eames; Australia	
100 m freestyle A8	Annelie Ahrenstrand; Sweden	Tracey Lewis; Australia	Isabelle Durandeau; France
100 m freestyle A9	Josee Lake; Canada	Jolande van de Zaag; Netherlands	Terri Turnbull; United States
100 m freestyle B1	Yvette Michel; Canada	Magdalena Tjernberg; Sweden	Janice Burton; Great Britain
100 m freestyle B2	Trischa Zorn; United States	Therese Donovan; Australia	Kelly Carroll; Great Britain
100 m freestyle B3	Barbara Eiler; United States	Gabriella Tjernberg; Sweden	Mary-Anne Wallace; Australia
100 m freestyle C3	Beatrice Pierre; France	Violette Spoka; France	Oddny Ottarsdottir; Iceland
100 m freestyle C4	Vibeke Hagen; Norway	Jane Stidever; Great Britain	Patricia Hennin; Canada
100 m freestyle C5	Jolanda Romero; Netherlands	Sylvie Delplauque; France	Anne Sandberg; Sweden
100 m freestyle C7	Stephanie Proust; France	Diane Hendriks; Netherlands	Susan Moucha; United States
100 m freestyle C8	Judy Goodrich; Canada	Ineke Hageraats; Netherlands	Gayle Ginnish; United States
100 m freestyle L4	Mirjam Sanders; Netherlands	Katarina Jewall; Sweden	Ana Peiro; Spain
100 m freestyle L5	Agnes Beraudias; France	Petra Heirbaut; Netherlands	Brigita Galicic; Yugoslavia
100 m freestyle L6	Immaculada Palencia; Spain	Manuela Aguilera; Spain	Rachael Marshall; Trinidad and Tobago
150 m individual medley A9	Josee Lake; Canada	Jolande van de Zaag; Netherlands	Jennifer Veenboer; Canada
200 m freestyle 2	Jose Faucher; Canada	S. Abels; Netherlands	D. Weber; West Germany
200 m freestyle 3	Malgorzata Adamik; Poland	Monika Lundborg; Sweden	Ursula King; Australia
200 m freestyle C4	Vibeke Hagen; Norway	Patricia Hennin; Canada	Jane Stidever; Great Britain
200 m freestyle C5	Jolanda Romero; Netherlands	Sylvie Delplauque; France	Anne Sandberg; Sweden
200 m freestyle C7	Stephanie Proust; France	Diane Hendriks; Netherlands	
200 m individual medley A1	Cheryl Anderson; United States	Maj Britt Mastad; Norway	Karen Davidson; Great Britain
200 m individual medley A2	Liesbeth Raes; Netherlands	Karen Gesierich; West Germany	Jan Wilson; United States
200 m individual medley A4	Janet Verkuil; Netherlands	Helena Brunner; Australia	Meredith Evans; Australia
200 m individual medley A6	Annemiek van Duyn; Netherlands	Rosemary Eames; Australia	
200 m individual medley A8	Annelie Ahrenstrand; Sweden	Isabelle Durandeau; France	Tracey Lewis; Australia
200 m individual medley B1	Yvette Michel; Canada	Andrea Rossi; Canada	Eeva Riitta Kukkonen; Finland
200 m individual medley B2	Trischa Zorn; United States	Eva Andersson; Sweden	Therese Donovan; Australia
200 m individual medley B3	Barbara Eiler; United States	Helen Bendiksen; Norway	Mary-Anne Wallace; Australia
200 m individual medley L4	Ana Peiro; Spain	Mirjam Sanders; Netherlands	Katarina Jewall; Sweden
200 m individual medley L5	Agnes Beraudias; France	Petra Heirbaut; Netherlands	Pilar Jabaloyas; Spain
200 m individual medley L6	Manuela Aguilera; Spain	Judit Hoffman; Hungary	
400 m breaststroke B1	Magdalena Tjernberg; Sweden	Lorraine Robinson; Great Britain	Andrea Rossi; Canada
400 m breaststroke B3	Cathy Schmitt; United States	Lori Johnson; United States	Marie Vanliere; United States
400 m freestyle 4	Marcia Bevard; United States	Jenny Orpwood; Great Britain	Bente Gronli; Norway
400 m freestyle 5	P. Delorme; France	Sigrid Voth; Canada	Kerrie Engel; Australia
400 m freestyle 6	H. Pettersen; Norway		
400 m freestyle A2	Liesbeth Raes; Netherlands	Karen Gesierich; West Germany	Jan Wilson; United States
400 m freestyle A4	Helena Brunner; Australia	Janet Verkuil; Netherlands	Meredith Evans; Australia
400 m freestyle B1	Magdalena Tjernberg; Sweden	Yvette Michel; Canada	Andrea Rossi; Canada
400 m freestyle B2	Eva Andersson; Sweden	Therese Donovan; Australia	Vurah Runyon; United States
400 m freestyle B3	Mary-Anne Wallace; Australia	Gabriella Tjernberg; Sweden	Helen Bendiksen; Norway
400 m individual medley B1	Andrea Rossi; Canada	Janice Burton; Great Britain	Lorraine Robinson; Great Britain
400 m individual medley B2	Trischa Zorn; United States		
400 m individual medley B3	Cathy Schmitt; United States	Gabriella Tjernberg; Sweden	Marie Vanliere; United States
3×25 m individual medley 1B	Isabel Barr; Great Britain	F. Maury; France	B. Smith; United States
4×25 m individual medley 2	Jose Faucher; Canada	D. Weber; West Germany	S. Abels; Netherlands
4×25 m individual medley 3	Malgorzata Adamik; Poland	Monika Lundborg; Sweden	M. Therese Crespo; France
3×50 m medley relay 2–4	Great Britain (GBR)	France (FRA)	
4×50 m freestyle relay 2–6	France (FRA)	Great Britain (GBR)	
4×50 m freestyle relay C1–C8	Canada (CAN)	United States (USA)	France (FRA)
4×50 m freestyle relay L1–L6	Spain (ESP)	Great Britain (GBR)	Norway (NOR)
4×50 m individual medley 4	Marcia Bevard; United States	Kerri-Anne Connor; Australia	Bente Gronli; Norway
4×50 m individual medley 5	P. Delorme; France	Malgorzata Kozlowska; Poland	S. Voth; Canada
4×50 m individual medley 6	Maria Jussara Matos; Brazil	H. Pettersen; Norway	
4×50 m medley relay L1–L6	Spain (ESP)	Great Britain (GBR)	Norway (NOR)
4 × 100 m freestyle relay A1–A9	Australia (AUS)	United States (USA)	Great Britain (GBR)
4 × 100 m freestyle relay B1–B3	Sweden (SWE)	United States (USA)	Great Britain (GBR)
4 × 100 m medley relay A1–A9	Australia (AUS)	United States (USA)	Great Britain (GBR)
4 × 100 m medley relay B1–B3	United States (USA)	Sweden (SWE)	Great Britain (GBR)
