= Athletics at the 1984 Summer Paralympics – Men's 100 metres B1 =

Men's 100 metres B1 at the VII Paralympic Games
- Paralympic Athletics
- Competitors: 31 from 22 nations

Medalists
1st place, gold medalist(s)		Winford Haynes	United States
2nd place, silver medalist(s)		Yvan Bourdeau	Canada
3rd place, bronze medalist(s)		Soedjeman Dipowidjojo; Stefan Bidzinski	Netherlands

The Men's 100 metres B1 was a sprinting event in athletics at the 1984 Summer Paralympics, for blind athletes. For the first time, category B was subdivided, with totally blind athletes running in the B1 event. Thirty-one athletes took part, representing twenty-two nations. Defending champion Jerzy Landos of Poland was not among them, but 1976 champion and 1980 silver medallist Winford Haynes, of the United States, was. Haynes won gold, setting a new Paralympic record in 11.78s.

The International Paralympic Committee's database does not record any heats, merely a "final round" in which all thirty-one athletes took part. Of these, twenty-nine have a recorded time and rank, while Burma's Hla Myint is recorded as having been disqualified. Greece's Charalambos Korbakis and Israel's David Jakubovich have no recorded time or rank, but the records do not specify whether they were non-starters, or whether they failed to finish due to injury, or whether they were disqualified.

Dutchman Soedjeman Dipowidjojo and Poland's Stefan Bidzinski both finished in 12.10 seconds, the third fastest time. Bidzinski is recorded as having finished fourth, behind Dipowidjojo, but both men were nonetheless awarded a bronze medal.

== Results ==
=== "Final round" ===
Place	Athlete	Time
1	Winford Haynes (USA)	11.78 (PR)
2	Yvan Bourdeau (CAN)	11.80
3	Soedjeman Dipowidjojo (NED)	12.10
4	Stefan Bidzinski (POL)	12.10
5	William McLeod (GBR)	12.30
6	Klaus Meyer (FRG)	12.44
7	Johan van Hoof (BEL)	12.48
8	Mario Sergio Fontes (BRA)	12.49
9	Urs Rehmann (SUI)	12.51
10	Lau Chung Wai (HKG)	12.54
11	Lonzey Jenkins (USA)	12.57
12	Kenji Abe (JPN)	12.90
13	Thant Zin (BIR)	12.91
14	Keith Myette (CAN)	12.98
15	Antonio Delgado (ESP)	13.02
16	Patrick York (CAN)	13.10
17	Kenji Marutani (JPN)	13.30
18	John Motley (USA)	13.49
19	Victor Diaz (VEN)	13.50
20	Murray Buck (AUS)	13.50
21	Fernando Lauriano (BRA)	13.55
22	Mwaniki Joseph (KEN)	13.70
23	Nicky Gleeson (AUS)	13.74
24	Bailey Compton (AUS)	13.90
25	Abdu Sheril Mohamed (EGY)	14.00
26	Ramon Flores (ARG)	14.31
27	Yafed (INA)	15.46
28	Sultan Al-Mutairi (KUW)	16.39
-	Hla Myint (BIR)	dq
-	David Jakubovich (ISR)	urc
-	Charalambos Korbakis (GRE)	urc
