= Spain at the 1984 Summer Paralympics =

- IPC code: ESP
- NPC: Spanish Paralympic Committee
- Website: www.paralimpicos.es (in Spanish)

in Stoke Mandeville/New York
- Medals: Gold 22 Silver 10 Bronze 12 Total 44

Summer Paralympics appearances (overview)
- 1968; 1972; 1976; 1980; 1984; 1988; 1992; 1996; 2000; 2004; 2008; 2012; 2016; 2020; 2024

Spain participated in the 1984 Summer Paralympics, where it won 22 gold medals, 10 silver medals and 12 bronze medals.

These were the first Games where Spain sent participants who had cerebral palsy.

In 1984, Spain had competitors in archery, wheelchair basketball, swimming, weightlifting, table tennis and athletics.

== Background ==
The 1984 Games were held in Stoke Mandeville, England and in New York, United States. The Games did not use the same venues as the Summer Olympics. Competitors with spinal cord injuries, amputations, cerebral palsy and vision impairments were eligible to compete in these Games.

At the 1984 Games, Great Britain won the most medals among all Les Autres events. They claimed 55. Spain was second with 38 and the United States was third with 26.

== Archery ==
One of Spain's silver medals came in archery. It was won by an athlete with a physical disability.

| Event | Gold | Silver | Bronze |
|---|---|---|---|
| Double FITA round integrated | Jan Thulin; Sweden | Antonio Rebollo; Spain | Raimo Tirronen; Finland |

== Athletics ==
Three of Spain's gold medals, one silver medal and three bronze medals came in athletics. Four of the medals were won by athletes with visual impairments. Three were won by athletes with physical disabilities.

| Event | Gold | Silver | Bronze |
|---|---|---|---|
| Long jump B1 | Yvan Bourdeau; Canada | Stefan Bidzinski; Poland | Antonio Delgado; Spain |
| Triple jump B1 | Soedjeman Dipowidjojo; Netherlands | José Manuel Rodríguez; Spain | Pauli Viertonen; Finland |
| Discus throw L3 | Eric Pearce; Great Britain | Peter Sorensen; Sweden | Alfredo Martin; Spain |
| Javelin throw L3 | Alfredo Martin; Spain | Peter Sorensen; Sweden | Eric Pearce; Great Britain |
| Shot put L3 | Peter Sorensen; Sweden | Eric Pearce; Great Britain | Alfredo Martins; Spain |
| 100 m B1 | Purificacion Santamarta; Spain | Lori Bennett; United States | Joke van Rijswijk; Netherlands |
| 400 m B1 | Purificacion Santamarta; Spain | Refija Okic; Yugoslavia | Rossella Inverni; Italy |

== Swimming ==
Nineteen of Spain's gold medals, eight silver medals and nine bronze medals came in swimming. All medals were won by athletes with physical disabilities.

| Event | Gold | Silver | Bronze |
|---|---|---|---|
| 50 m backstroke L3 | Andras Toth; Hungary | Francisco Flores; Spain | Thierry Legloanic; France |
| 50 m breaststroke L3 | Francisco Flores; Spain | Peter Williams; Great Britain | Mogens Christensen; Denmark |
| 50 m freestyle L3 | Francisco Flores; Spain | Gordon Crowe; Great Britain | Bill Lehr; United States |
| 100 m backstroke L4 | Eugenio Jimenez; Spain | Michael Lapp; West Germany | Andrew Gilbert; Great Britain |
| 100 m backstroke L5 | Alberto Gomez; Spain | Holger Woelk; West Germany | Jorge Gotzens; Spain |
| 100 m breaststroke L4 | Eric Fleury; France | Juan Castane; Spain | Michael Lapp; West Germany |
| 100 m breaststroke L5 | Theo van der Meijden; Netherlands | Alberto Gomez; Spain | Roberto Garcia; Spain |
| 100 m butterfly L4 | Alberto Jofre; Spain | Marcel Poulisse; Netherlands | Eric Fleury; France |
| 100 m butterfly L5 | Claude Dupin; France | Theo van der Meijden; Netherlands | Alberto Gomez; Spain |
| 100 m freestyle L4 | Marcel Poulisse; Netherlands | Alberto Jofre; Spain | Andrew Gilbert; Great Britain |
| 100 m freestyle L5 | Alberto Gomez; Spain | Gyorgy Tory; Hungary | Theo van der Meijden; Netherlands |
| 200 m individual medley L4 | Juan Castane; Spain | Marcel Poulisse; Netherlands | Eric Fleury; France |
| 200 m individual medley L5 | Claude Dupin; France | Gyorgy Tory; Hungary | Roberto Garcia; Spain |
| 4×50 m freestyle relay L1–L6 | Spain (ESP) | Great Britain (GBR) | France (FRA) |
| 4×50 m medley relay L1–L6 | Hungary (HUN); Attila Jeszenszky; Laszlo Palinkas; Ferenc Stettner; Gyorgy Tory | Spain (ESP) | Great Britain (GBR) |
| 50 m backstroke L3 | Petra Schad; West Germany | Teresa Herreras; Spain | Marjolein van Riel; Netherlands |
| 50 m breaststroke L3 | Teresa Herreras; Spain | Irene Hotchin; Great Britain | Eva Lundquist; Sweden |
| 50 m freestyle L3 | Teresa Herreras; Spain | Petra Schad; West Germany | Irene Hotchin; Great Britain |
| 100 m backstroke L4 | Ana Peiro; Spain | Mirjam Sanders; Netherlands | Katarina Jewall; Sweden |
| 100 m backstroke L5 | Agnes Beraudias; France | Pilar Jabaloyas; Spain | Petra Heirbaut; Netherlands |
| 100 m backstroke L6 | Manuela Aguilera; Spain | Judit Hoffman; Hungary | |
| 100 m breaststroke L4 | Mirjam Sanders; Netherlands | Maj Berger; Norway | Ana Peiro; Spain |
| 100 m breaststroke L5 | Petra Heirbaut; Netherlands | Agnes Beraudias; France | Laura Tramuns; Spain |
| 100 m butterfly L4 | Ana Peiro; Spain | Katarina Jewall; Sweden | Mirjam Sanders; Netherlands |
| 100 m butterfly L5 | Agnes Beraudias; France | Petra Heirbaut; Netherlands | Pilar Jabaloyas; Spain |
| 100 m butterfly L6 | Immaculada Palencia; Spain | | |
| 100 m freestyle L4 | Mirjam Sanders; Netherlands | Katarina Jewall; Sweden | Ana Peiro; Spain |
| 100 m freestyle L6 | Immaculada Palencia; Spain | Manuela Aguilera; Spain | Rachael Marshall; Trinidad and Tobago |
| 200 m individual medley L4 | Ana Peiro; Spain | Mirjam Sanders; Netherlands | Katarina Jewall; Sweden |
| 200 m individual medley L5 | Agnes Beraudias; France | Petra Heirbaut; Netherlands | Pilar Jabaloyas; Spain |
| 200 m individual medley L6 | Manuela Aguilera; Spain | Judit Hoffman; Hungary | |
| 4×50 m freestyle relay L1–L6 | Spain (ESP) | Great Britain (GBR) | Norway (NOR) |
| 4×50 m medley relay L1–L6 | Spain (ESP) | Great Britain (GBR) | Norway (NOR) |
