= Archery at the 1984 Summer Paralympics – Men's double FITA round team 1A-6 =

Men's double FITA round team 1A-6 at the VII Paralympic Games
- Paralympic Archery
- Competitors: 9 from 3 nations

The Men's double FITA round team 1A-6 was an archery competition at the 1984 Summer Paralympics.

The Belgian team won the gold medal.

== Results ==
Rank	Team	Points
1st place, gold medalist(s)	Belgium (BEL)	6774
2nd place, silver medalist(s)	Netherlands (NED)	6726
3rd place, bronze medalist(s)	Great Britain (GBR)	6533
