= Archery at the 1984 Summer Paralympics – Women's double FITA round division 3 =

Women's double FITA round division 3 at the VII Paralympic Games
- Paralympic Archery
- Competitors: 2 from 1 nation

Medalists
1st place, gold medalist(s)		Helen Hilderley	Great Britain
2nd place, silver medalist(s)		Beverley Leaper	Great Britain

The Women's double FITA round division 3 was an archery competition at the 1984 Summer Paralympics.

The British archer Helen Hilderley won the gold medal.

== Results ==
Rank	Athlete	Points
1st place, gold medalist(s)	Helen Hilderley (GBR)	427
2nd place, silver medalist(s)	Beverley Leaper (GBR)	96
