= Great Britain at the 1984 Summer Paralympics =

- Flag of the United Kingdom
- IPC code: GBR
- NPC: British Paralympic Association
- Website: www.paralympics.org.uk

in Stoke Mandeville/New York
- Competitors: 227 in 15 sports
- Medals Ranked 2nd: Gold 107 Silver 112 Bronze 112 Total 331

Summer Paralympics appearances (overview)
- 1960; 1964; 1968; 1972; 1976; 1980; 1984; 1988; 1992; 1996; 2000; 2004; 2008; 2012; 2016; 2020; 2024

Great Britain was the co-host of the 1984 Summer Paralympics in Stoke Mandeville, United Kingdom and New York City, United States. It was represented by 227 athletes competing in archery, athletics, boccia, cycling, equestrian, football, lawn bowls, powerlifting, shooting, snooker, swimming, table tennis, volleyball, wheelchair basketball, and wheelchair fencing. It finished second in the overall medal count, with a total of 331 medals.

By hosting the Games in Stoke Mandeville, Britain was returning them to their roots. The Paralympic Games had grown out of the Stoke Mandeville Games, founded in 1948.

At the 1984 Games, Great Britain won the most medals among all Les Autres events. They claimed 55. Spain was second with 38 and the United States was third with 26.

== Medalists ==
=== Gold medalists ===
Medal	Name	Sport	Event
Gold	Philip Thorne	Archery	Men's double FITA round C3/C6
Gold	Helen Hilderley	Archery	Women's FITA round division 3
Gold	Colin Keay	Athletics	Men's 60m C6
Gold	John Welsh	Athletics	Men's 60m L1
Gold	Derek Nixon	Athletics	Men's 100m L5
Gold	Colin Keay	Athletics	Men's 400m C6
Gold	John Fisher	Athletics	Men's 400m L4
Gold	Robert Matthews	Athletics	Men's 800m B1
Gold	James Brown	Athletics	Men's 800m B3
Gold	Colin Keay	Athletics	Men's 1000m cross country C6
Gold	Robert Matthews	Athletics	Men's 1500m B1
Gold	James Brown	Athletics	Men's 1500m B3
Gold	Robert Matthews	Athletics	Men's 5000m B1
Gold	Gary Gardner; Darren Rabin; Gerard McConnell; Paul Taylor	Athletics	Men's 4 × 100 m relay C7-8
Gold	Norman Burns	Athletics	Men's club throw C4
Gold	Anthony Griffin	Athletics	Men's club throw C6
Gold	John Harris	Athletics	Men's discus throw 5
Gold	Robert Tee	Athletics	Men's discus throw L2
Gold	Eric Pearce	Athletics	Men's discus throw L3
Gold	Robert Lowe	Athletics	Men's discus throw L4
Gold	Kevin McGee	Athletics	Men's discus throw L6
Gold	Norman Burns	Athletics	Men's javelin throw C4
Gold	Anthony Griffin	Athletics	Men's javelin throw C6
Gold	Derek Nixon	Athletics	Men's javelin throw L6
Gold	Tom O'Brien	Athletics	Men's shot put L1
Gold	Robert Lowe	Athletics	Men's shot put L4
Gold	Barry Antonio	Athletics	Men's shot put L6
Gold	Merle Whiteley	Athletics	Men's pentathlon B3
Gold	Aileen Harper	Athletics	Women's 60m C3
Gold	Loraine Charters	Athletics	Women's 60m C6
Gold	Wilma Lawrie	Athletics	Women's 100m L2
Gold	Brenda Woodcock	Athletics	Women's 200m C8
Gold	Brenda Woodcock	Athletics	Women's 400m C8
Gold	Wilma Lawrie	Athletics	Women's 400m L2
Gold	Julia Scarlett	Athletics	Women's 800m A6
Gold	Brenda Woodcock	Athletics	Women's 1000m cross country C8
Gold	Catherine Welsby	Athletics	Women's high jump B1
Gold	Evelyn Dicks	Athletics	Women's long jump A2
Gold	Valerie Smith	Athletics	Women's club throw C2
Gold	Aileen Harper	Athletics	Women's club throw C3
Gold	Jane Peters	Athletics	Women's club throw C5
Gold	Lisa Barker	Athletics	Women's club throw L1
Gold	Barbara Joscelyne	Athletics	Women's discus throw A6
Gold	Amanda Kyffin	Athletics	Women's discus throw C6
Gold	Mary McCann	Athletics	Women's discus throw L2
Gold	Kim White	Athletics	Women's discus throw L3
Gold	Margaret Heald	Athletics	Women's discus throw L6
Gold	Anne Swann	Athletics	Women's distance C2
Gold	Dzaier Neil	Athletics	Women's javelin throw 1B
Gold	Janice Moores	Athletics	Women's javelin throw B1
Gold	Linda Fyfe	Athletics	Women's javelin throw C3
Gold	Susan Stevenson	Athletics	Women's javelin throw C4
Gold	Jane Peters	Athletics	Women's javelin throw C5
Gold	Mary McCann	Athletics	Women's javelin throw L2
Gold	Kim White	Athletics	Women's javelin throw L3
Gold	Amanda Beverley Little	Athletics	Women's precision throw C1
Gold	Dorothy Ripley	Athletics	Women's shot put 3
Gold	Karen Davidson	Athletics	Women's shot put A1
Gold	Anne Swann	Athletics	Women's shot put C2
Gold	Linda Fyfe	Athletics	Women's shot put C3
Gold	Irene Hotchin	Athletics	Women's shot put L2
Gold	Kim White	Athletics	Women's shot put C5
Gold	Anne Swann	Athletics	Women's medicine ball thrust C2
Gold	Aileen Harper	Athletics	Women's slalom C3
Gold	Clovee Fox	Athletics	Women's slalom C4
Gold	Carol Johnson	Boccia	Women's individual C1
Gold	Jane Stidever	Equestrian	Dressage - Elementary walk/trot C4-5
Gold	Richard Coates; Anthony Prowse	Lawn bowls	Men's pairs A6/8
Gold	Richard Coates	Lawn bowls	Men's singles A6/8
Gold	K. Ellison	Lawn bowls	Men's singles tetraplegic
Gold	R. Thompson; T. Ure	Lawn bowls	Mixed pairs paraplegic
Gold	A. Smith	Lawn bowls	Women's singles A2/4
Gold	Yvonne Hawtin	Lawn bowls	Women's singles paraplegic
Gold	Peter Haslam	Shooting	Men's air rifle kneeling 1A-1C
Gold	Isabel Barr	Shooting	Women's air pistol 1A-1C
Gold	Peter Haslam	Snooker	Men's tetraplegic
Gold	Mike Kenny	Swimming	Men's 25m backstroke 1A
Gold	Kenneth Cairns	Swimming	Men's 25m backstroke 1B
Gold	Mike Kenny	Swimming	Men's 25m breaststroke 1A
Gold	Kenneth Cairns	Swimming	Men's 25m breaststroke 1B
Gold	Mike Kenny	Swimming	Men's 25m freestyle 1A
Gold	Kenneth Cairns	Swimming	Men's 25m freestyle 1B
Gold	Robin Surgeoner	Swimming	Men's 50m backstroke C4
Gold	Martin Mansell	Swimming	Men's 50m backstroke C5
Gold	Chris Hallam	Swimming	Men's 50m breaststroke 2
Gold	Robin Surgeoner	Swimming	Men's 50m freestyle C4
Gold	Peter Aldous	Swimming	Men's 100m butterfly A2
Gold	James Muirhead	Swimming	Men's 100m butterfly B1
Gold	Mike Kenny	Swimming	Men's 100m freestyle 1A
Gold	Kenneth Cairns	Swimming	Men's 100m freestyle 1B
Gold	Robin Surgeoner	Swimming	Men's 100m freestyle C4
Gold	Robin Surgeoner	Swimming	Men's 200m freestyle C4
Gold	Mike Kenny	Swimming	Men's 3x25m individual medley 1B
Gold	Men's relay team	Swimming	Men's 4x50m freestyle relay C1-C8
Gold	Isabel Barr	Swimming	Women's 25m breaststroke 1B
Gold	Isabel Barr	Swimming	Women's 25m butterfly 1B
Gold	Diane Wiscombe	Swimming	Women's 25m freestyle C2
Gold	Valerie Smith	Swimming	Women's 25m freestyle with aids C2
Gold	Janice Burton	Swimming	Women's 50m breaststroke B1
Gold	Mary Ann Low	Swimming	Women's 50m freestyle B1
Gold	Isabel Barr	Swimming	Women's 3x25m individual medley 1B
Gold	Women's relay team	Swimming	Women's 3x50m medley relay 2-4
Gold	Jane Blackburn	Table tennis	Women's singles 1bB
Gold	Becker	Table tennis	Women's singles 1C
Gold	Women's team	Table tennis	Women's 1A-C
Gold	Brian Stones	Weightlifting	Men's 57kg paraplegic
Gold	Kevin Davies	Wheelchair fencing	Men's sabre individual 4-5

=== Silver medalists ===
Medal	Name	Sport	Event
Silver	Beverley Leaper	Archery	Women's double FITA round division 3
Silver	Peter Williams	Athletics	Men's 100m L6
Silver	John Watson	Athletics	Men's 400m A6
Silver	Noel Thatcher	Athletics	Men's 400m B3
Silver	Gordon Robertson	Athletics	Men's 400m C6
Silver	Gary Gardner	Athletics	Men's 1500m cross country C7
Silver	Peter Williams	Athletics	Men's 1500m L6
Silver	Neil Pearson	Athletics	Men's 5000m B3
Silver	Norman Burns; Michael Hipkin; Anthony Honour; Paul Williams	Athletics	Men's 4 × 100 m relay C4
Silver	Anthony Willis	Athletics	Men's high jump A2
Silver	Ronald West	Athletics	Men's high jump A5
Silver	John Simpson	Athletics	Men's club throw C3
Silver	Paul McGinty	Athletics	Men's club throw C5
Silver	Philip Sadler	Athletics	Men's discus throw A9
Silver	John Simpson	Athletics	Men's discus throw C3
Silver	Gerard McConnell	Athletics	Men's discus throw C8
Silver	Tom O'Brien	Athletics	Men's discus throw L1
Silver	Derek Nixon	Athletics	Men's discus throw L6
Silver	Leslie Jones	Athletics	Men's javelin throw 4
Silver	Philip Sadler	Athletics	Men's javelin throw A9
Silver	John Simpson	Athletics	Men's javelin throw C3
Silver	Kevan McNicholas	Athletics	Men's shot put 2
Silver	John Simpson	Athletics	Men's shot put C3
Silver	Robert Tee	Athletics	Men's shot put L2
Silver	Eric Pearce	Athletics	Men's shot put L3
Silver	Amanda Kyffin	Athletics	Women's 60m C6
Silver	Barbara Joscelyne	Athletics	Women's 100m A6
Silver	Amanda Kyffin	Athletics	Women's 200m C6
Silver	Anne Trotman	Athletics	Women's club throw C3
Silver	Susan Stevenson	Athletics	Women's club throw C4
Silver	Isabel Barr	Athletics	Women's discus throw 1B
Silver	Dorothy Ripley	Athletics	Women's discus throw 3
Silver	Karen Davidson	Athletics	Women's discus throw A1
Silver	Michelle Message	Athletics	Women's discus throw B2
Silver	Jane Peters	Athletics	Women's discus throw C5
Silver	Irene Hotchin	Athletics	Women's discus throw L2
Silver	Amanda Beverley Little	Athletics	Women's distance throw C1
Silver	Maria Brooks	Athletics	Women's distance throw C2
Silver	Dorothy Ripley	Athletics	Women's javelin throw 3
Silver	Mary Clark	Athletics	Women's javelin throw B2
Silver	Anne Trotman	Athletics	Women's javelin throw C3
Silver	Helen Hilderley	Athletics	Women's javelin throw C4
Silver	Isabel Barr	Athletics	Women's shot put 1B
Silver	Barbara Joscelyne	Athletics	Women's shot put A6
Silver	Michelle Message	Athletics	Women's shot put B2
Silver	Valerie Smith	Athletics	Women's shot put C2
Silver	Susan Stevenson	Athletics	Women's shot put C4
Silver	Jane Peters	Athletics	Women's shot put C5
Silver	Amanda Kyffin	Athletics	Women's shot put C6
Silver	Mary McCann	Athletics	Women's shot put L2
Silver	Maria Brooks	Athletics	Women's medicine ball thrust C2
Silver	Maria Brooks	Athletics	Women's slalom (leg) C2
Silver	Valerie Smith	Athletics	Women's slalom C2
Silver	Anne Trotman	Athletics	Women's slalom C3
Silver	Diane Wiscombe	Boccia	Women's individual C2
Silver	Carol Johnson; Alin Kerwin; Paula Monzani	Boccia	Mixed team
Silver	J. Gladman; Bernard Wessier	Lawn bowls	Men's pairs A2/4
Silver	Paul Hubball	Lawn bowls	Men's singles paraplegic
Silver	Isabel Barr	Lawn bowls	Men's singles tetraplegic
Silver	Ken Bridgeman; Yvonne Hawtin	Lawn bowls	Mixed pairs paraplegic
Silver	Yvonne Hawtin; R. Thompson	Lawn bowls	Women's pairs paraplegic
Silver	R. Thompson	Lawn bowls	Women's singles paraplegic
Silver	Anthony Griffin	Powerlifting	Men's 52kg
Silver	Peter Haslam	Shooting	Men's air rifle prone 1A-1C
Silver	Men's team	Shooting	Men's pistol team 1A-6
Silver	Anne Picot	Shooting	Women's air rifle integrated
Silver	Deanna Coates	Shooting	Women's air rifle kneeling 2-6
Silver	Deanna Coates	Shooting	Women's air rifle standing 2-6
Silver	Peter Haslam	Shooting	Mixed air rifle 3 positions 1A-1C
Silver	Jim Buchanan	Snooker	Men's paraplegic
Silver	K. Ellison	Snooker	Men's tetraplegic
Silver	William Maxwell McKay	Swimming	Men's 25m backstroke C6
Silver	Mark Chard	Swimming	Men's 25m freestyle C2
Silver	Steven Varden	Swimming	Men's 25m freestyle with aids C2
Silver	Ronald West	Swimming	Men's 50m breaststroke A5
Silver	Peter Williams	Swimming	Men's 50m breaststroke L3
Silver	Gordon Crowe	Swimming	Men's 50m freestyle L3
Silver	Martin Mansell	Swimming	Men's 100m backstroke C5
Silver	Chris Hampshire	Swimming	Men's 100m backstroke C7
Silver	Kevin McGee	Swimming	Men's 100m backstroke L6
Silver	James Muirhead	Swimming	Men's 100m freestyle B1
Silver	Martin Mansell	Swimming	Men's 100m freestyle C5
Silver	Martin Mansell	Swimming	Men's 200m freestyle C5
Silver	Anthony Stickland	Swimming	Men's 200m individual medley A2
Silver	Kenneth Cairns; Chris Davies; Mike Kenny	Swimming	Men's 3x25m freestyle relay 1A-1C
Silver	Kenneth Cairns	Swimming	Men's 3x25m individual medley 1B
Silver	Men's relay team	Swimming	Men's 4x50m freestyle relay L1-L6
Silver	Tara Flood	Swimming	Women's 25m backstroke L1
Silver	Mary McCann	Swimming	Women's 25m backstroke L2
Silver	Mary McCann	Swimming	Women's 25m freestyle L2
Silver	D. Smith	Swimming	Women's 50m breaststroke 23
Silver	Mary Ann Low	Swimming	Women's 50m breaststroke B1
Silver	Irene Hotchin	Swimming	Women's 50m breaststroke L3
Silver	Jane Lawson	Swimming	Women's 50m freestyle B3
Silver	Janice Burton	Swimming	Women's 100m backstroke B1
Silver	Jenny Orpwood	Swimming	Women's 100m breaststroke 4
Silver	Isabel Barr	Swimming	Women's 100m freestyle 1B
Silver	Jane Stidever	Swimming	Women's 100m freestyle C4
Silver	Lorraine Robinson	Swimming	Women's 400m breaststroke B1
Silver	Jenny Orpwood	Swimming	Women's 400m freestyle 4
Silver	Janice Burton	Swimming	Women's 400m individual medley B1
Silver	Women's relay team	Swimming	Women's 4x50m freestyle relay 2-6
Silver	Women's relay team	Swimming	Women's 4x50m freestyle L1-L6
Silver	Women's relay team	Swimming	Women's 4x50m medley relay L1-L6
Silver	Tony Edge	Table tennis	Men's singles 1B
Silver	Allen Francis	Table tennis	Men's singles C1
Silver	Dzaier Neil	Table tennis	Women's singles 1C
Silver	J. Petersen	Table tennis	Women's singles C3
Silver	Margaret Heald	Table tennis	Women's singles L3
Silver	Chris Wood	Weightlifting	Men's 57kg paraplegic
Silver	Anthony Bishop	Weightlifting	Men's 95kg integrated
Silver	Ralph Rowe	Weightlifting	Men's 95kg paraplegic

=== Bronze medalists ===
Medal	Name	Sport	Event
Bronze	Ernest Arnold	Archery	Men's double advanced metric round tetraplegic
Bronze	Jim Buchanan; Michael Harvey-Murray; Sandy Gregory	Archery	Men's double FITA round team 1A-6
Bronze	Ernest Arnold; Kevin Bowser; James Martin	Archery	Men's short metric round team 1A-6
Bronze	Anne Gray	Archery	Women's double short metric round paraplegic
Bronze	Edwin Moore	Athletics	Men's 60m C2
Bronze	Gordon Robertson	Athletics	Men's 60m C6
Bronze	Keith Whiley	Athletics	Men's 100m L3
Bronze	Robert Love	Athletics	Men's 100m L6
Bronze	Edwin Moore	Athletics	Men's 200m C2
Bronze	Graham Salmon	Athletics	Men's 400m B1
Bronze	John Grant	Athletics	Men's 400m L3
Bronze	Peter Williams	Athletics	Men's 400m L6
Bronze	John Grant	Athletics	Men's 800m L3
Bronze	Paul Taylor	Athletics	Men's 1500m cross country C8
Bronze	Robert Love	Athletics	Men's 1500m L6
Bronze	Anthony Willis	Athletics	Men's long jump A2
Bronze	Robert Latham	Athletics	Men's triple jump B2
Bronze	Edwin Moore	Athletics	Men's club throw C2
Bronze	Eric Green	Athletics	Men's club throw C5
Bronze	Tom O'Brien	Athletics	Men's club throw L1
Bronze	Jason Beasley	Athletics	Men's discus throw C3
Bronze	David Pearce	Athletics	Men's distance throw C1
Bronze	Peter Barnes	Athletics	Men's javelin throw A3
Bronze	Eric Pearce	Athletics	Men's javelin throw L3
Bronze	Leslie Jones	Athletics	Men's shot put 4
Bronze	Steven Varden	Athletics	Men's shot put C2
Bronze	Paul Taylor	Athletics	Men's shot put C8
Bronze	Christopher McKeown	Athletics	Men's shot put L5
Bronze	Derek Nixon	Athletics	Men's shot put L6
Bronze	Terry Hudson	Athletics	Men's slalom C1
Bronze	Jason Beasley	Athletics	Men's slalom C3
Bronze	Norman Burns	Athletics	Men's slalom C4
Bronze	Valerie Smith	Athletics	Women's 20m (arm) C2
Bronze	Susan Stevenson	Athletics	Women's 100m C4
Bronze	Loraine Charters	Athletics	Women's 200m C6
Bronze	D. Smith	Athletics	Women's marathon 3
Bronze	Catherine Welsby	Athletics	Women's long jump B1
Bronze	Linda Fyfe	Athletics	Women's club throw C3
Bronze	Helen Hilderley	Athletics	Women's club throw C4
Bronze	Paula Knapper	Athletics	Women's club throw C5
Bronze	Anne Trotman	Athletics	Women's discus throw C3
Bronze	Helen Hilderley	Athletics	Women's discus throw C4
Bronze	Dawn McDade	Athletics	Women's discus throw L5
Bronze	Karen Davidson	Athletics	Women's javelin throw A1
Bronze	Amanda Kyffin	Athletics	Women's javelin throw C6
Bronze	Dzaier Neil	Athletics	Women's shot put 1B
Bronze	Helen Hilderley	Athletics	Women's shot put C4
Bronze	Mary Clark	Athletics	Women's pentathlon B2
Bronze	Jason Beasley; Maria Brooks; Anne Trotman	Athletics	Mixed 3x60m relay C2-3
Bronze	Terry Hudson	Boccia	Men's individual C1
Bronze	Mark Chard	Boccia	Men's individual C2
Bronze	Men's CP football 7-a-side team	Football 7-a-side	Men's CP tournament
Bronze	Men's wheelchair football 7-a-side team	Football 7-a-side	Men's wheelchair tournament
Bronze	John Gronow; Paul Hubball	Lawn bowls	Men's pairs paraplegic
Bronze	Chris Gibson	Lawn bowls	Men's singles paraplegic
Bronze	Tommy Taylor	Lawn bowls	Men's singles tetraplegic
Bronze	Keith Bell	Powerlifting	Men's 75kg
Bronze	Peter Haslam	Shooting	Men's air rifle standing 1A-1C
Bronze	Deanna Coates	Shooting	Women's air rifle 3 positions 2-6
Bronze	Mike Langley	Snooker	Men's paraplegic
Bronze	Tommy Taylor	Snooker	Men's tetraplegic
Bronze	J. Murray	Swimming	Men's 25m backstroke C6
Bronze	Chris Hampshire	Swimming	Men's 50m backstroke C7
Bronze	Alastair Fairweather	Swimming	Men's 50m freestyle B1
Bronze	Scott Smith	Swimming	Women's 50m freestyle B3
Bronze	Anthony Stickland	Swimming	Men's 100m backstroke A2
Bronze	James Muirhead	Swimming	Men's 100m backstroke B1
Bronze	Andrew Gilbert	Swimming	Men's 100m backstroke L4
Bronze	Gareth Thomas	Swimming	Men's 100m backstroke L6
Bronze	Andrew Gilbert	Swimming	Men's 100m freestyle L4
Bronze	James Muirhead	Swimming	Men's 200m individual medley B1
Bronze	James Muirhead	Swimming	Men's 400m freestyle B1
Bronze	Men's relay team	Swimming	Men's 4x50m medley relay L1-L6
Bronze	Isabel Barr	Swimming	Women's 25m backstroke 1B
Bronze	Lisa Barker	Swimming	Women's 25m backstroke L1
Bronze	Isabel Barr	Swimming	Women's 25m freestyle 1B
Bronze	Anna Blake	Swimming	Women's 25m freestyle C6
Bronze	Tara Flood	Swimming	Women's 25m freestyle L1
Bronze	Carol Johnson	Swimming	Women's 25m freestyle with aids C2
Bronze	Beverley Leaper	Swimming	Women's 50m backstroke C7
Bronze	Heather Taylor	Swimming	Women's 50m breaststroke B2
Bronze	Jane Stidever	Swimming	Women's 50m freestyle C4
Bronze	Anna Blake	Swimming	Women's 50m freestyle C6
Bronze	Brenda Woodcock	Swimming	Women's 50m freestyle C8
Bronze	Irene Hotchin	Swimming	Women's 50m freestyle L3
Bronze	Jenny Orpwood	Swimming	Women's 100m backstroke 4
Bronze	Wendy Mason	Swimming	Women's 100m backstroke A2
Bronze	Lorraine Robinson	Swimming	Women's 100m breaststroke B1
Bronze	Kelly Carroll	Swimming	Women's 100m breaststroke B2
Bronze	Heather Taylor	Swimming	Women's 100m butterfly B2
Bronze	Jenny Orpwood	Swimming	Women's 100m freestyle 4
Bronze	Janice Burton	Swimming	Women's 100m freestyle B1
Bronze	Kelly Carroll	Swimming	Women's 100m freestyle B2
Bronze	Jane Stidever	Swimming	Women's 200m freestyle C4
Bronze	Karen Davidson	Swimming	Women's 200m individual medley A1
Bronze	Lorraine Robinson	Swimming	Women's 400m individual medley B1
Bronze	Women's relay team	Swimming	Women's 4 × 100 m freestyle relay A1-A9
Bronze	Women's relay team	Swimming	Women's 4 × 100 m freestyle relay B1-B3
Bronze	Women's relay team	Swimming	Women's 4 × 100 m medley relay A1-A9
Bronze	Women's relay team	Swimming	Women's 4 × 100 m medley relay B1-B3
Bronze	John Welsh	Table tennis	Men's singles L1
Bronze	Mick Dolan; Brian Smith	Table tennis	Men's teams 1A
Bronze	Tony Edge; James Munkley; Tom Doughty	Table tennis	Men's teams 1B
Bronze	A. Smith	Table tennis	Women's singles L4
Bronze	Women's team	Table tennis	Women's teams 2
Bronze	Alper Ali	Weightlifting	Men's 65kg integrated
Bronze	Fred McKenzie	Weightlifting	Men's 85kg integrated
Bronze	Barry Travis	Wheelchair fencing	Men's foil individual 1B
Bronze	John Clark	Wheelchair fencing	Men's foil individual 4-5
Bronze	John Clark; Kevin Davies; David Hickson; Jim Parkinson	Wheelchair fencing	Men's foil team
Bronze	Brian Dickinson	Wheelchair fencing	Men's sabre individual 2-3
Bronze	Kevin Davies; Brian Dickinson; Tom Killin; Terry Willett	Wheelchair fencing	Men's sabre team

=== Medals by sport ===
Medals by sport
Sport	Gold medal	Silver medal	Bronze medal	Total
Athletics	63	53	45	161
Swimming	26	33	39	98
Lawn Bowls	6	6	3	15
Table tennis	3	5	5	13
Shooting	2	6	2	10
Archery	2	1	4	7
Weightlifting	1	3	2	6
Boccia	1	2	2	5
Snooker	1	2	2	5
Wheelchair Fencing	1	0	5	6
Equestrian	1	0	0	1
Powerlifting	0	1	1	2
Football 7-a-side	0	0	2	2
Total	107	112	112	331

== See also ==
- Great Britain at the Paralympics
- Great Britain at the 1984 Summer Olympics
