= Archery at the 1984 Summer Paralympics – Men's double advanced metric round tetraplegic =

Men's double advanced metric round tetraplegic at the VII Paralympic Games
- Paralympic Archery
- Competitors: 6 from 6 nations

Medalists
1st place, gold medalist(s)		Gerhard Frank	Austria
2nd place, silver medalist(s)		Ian Trewhella	Australia
3rd place, bronze medalist(s)		Ernest Arnold	Great Britain

The Men's Double Advanced Metric Round Tetraplegic was an archery competition in the 1984 Summer Paralympics.

The Austrian competitor, Gerhard Frank, won the gold medal.

== Results ==
Rank	Athlete	Points
1st place, gold medalist(s)	Gerhard Frank (AUT)	1646
2nd place, silver medalist(s)	Ian Trewhella (AUS)	1504
3rd place, bronze medalist(s)	Ernest Arnold (GBR)	1436
4	Martti Rantavuori (FIN)	1429
4	Bo-Anders Fjallner (SWE)	1339
4	David Hynds (NZL)	1109
