= 1984 Summer Paralympics medal table =

1984 Summer Paralympics medals
- Location: Stoke Mandeville and New york Great Britain, United States

Highlights
- Most gold medals: United States (137)
- Most total medals: United States (397)
- Medalling NPCs: 43

The 1984 Summer Paralympics medal table is a list of National Paralympic Committees (NPCs) ranked by the number of gold medals won by their athletes during the 1984 Summer Paralympics, held in Stoke Mandeville, United Kingdom from July 22 to August 1, 1984, and Nassau County, New York, United States, from June 17 to 30, 1984.

== Medal table ==
The ranking in this table is based on information provided by the International Paralympic Committee (IPC) and is consistent with IPC convention in its published medal tables. By default, the table is ordered by the number of gold medals the athletes from a nation have won (in this context, a "nation" is an entity represented by a National Paralympic Committee). The number of silver medals is taken into consideration next and then the number of bronze medals. If nations are still tied, equal ranking is given and they are listed alphabetically by IPC country code.

Historian Dr. Ian Brittain’s research has shown that many medals were awarded for events that don’t appear in the official results; thus, some athletes will never take their place in Paralympic history.

To sort this table by nation, total medal count, or any other column, click on the icon next to the column title.

Rank	Nation	Gold	Silver	Bronze	Total
1	United States (USA)*	137	131	129	397
2	Great Britain (GBR)*	107	112	112	331
3	Canada (CAN)	87	82	69	238
4	Sweden (SWE)	83	43	34	160
5	West Germany (FRG)	81	76	75	232
6	France (FRA)	71	69	46	186
7	Netherlands (NED)	55	52	28	135
8	Australia (AUS)	49	54	51	154
9	Poland (POL)	46	39	21	106
10	Norway (NOR)	30	30	30	90
11	Denmark (DEN)	30	13	16	59
12	Spain (ESP)	22	10	12	44
13	Belgium (BEL)	21	23	14	58
14	Ireland (IRL)	20	15	31	66
15	Finland (FIN)	18	14	27	59
16	Switzerland (SUI)	18	13	12	43
17	Austria (AUT)	14	20	10	44
18	Hungary (HUN)	12	13	3	28
19	Israel (ISR)	11	21	12	44
20	Yugoslavia (YUG)	11	10	11	32
21	Italy (ITA)	9	19	14	42
22	Japan (JPN)	9	7	8	24
23	New Zealand (NZL)	8	10	7	25
24	Brazil (BRA)	7	17	4	28
25	Mexico (MEX)	6	14	17	37
26	Portugal (POR)	4	3	7	14
27	Hong Kong (HKG)	3	5	9	17
28	China (CHN)	2	12	8	22
29	Trinidad and Tobago (TRI)	2	0	1	3
30	Luxembourg (LUX)	1	4	1	6
31	Kuwait (KUW)	1	3	4	8
32	Burma (BIR)	1	2	1	4
33	Egypt (EGY)	1	1	5	7
34	Kenya (KEN)	1	1	1	3
35	East Germany (GDR)	0	3	1	4
36	Iceland (ISL)	0	2	8	10
37	India (IND)	0	2	2	4
37	South Korea (KOR)	0	2	2	4
39	Jordan (JOR)	0	1	2	3
39	Zimbabwe (ZIM)	0	1	2	3
41	Bahamas (BAH)	0	1	1	2
41	Indonesia (INA)	0	1	1	2
43	Bahrain (BRN)	0	0	2	2
Totals (43 entries)		978	951	851	2,780

== See also ==
- 1984 Summer Olympics medal table
- 1984 Winter Paralympics medal table
