= Athletics at the 1984 Summer Paralympics – Women's marathon 3 =

Women's marathon 3 at the VII Paralympic Games
- Paralympic Athletics
- Competitors: 4 from 4 nations

Medalists
1st place, gold medalist(s)		Gabriele Beyer	West Germany
2nd place, silver medalist(s)		Julie Russell	Australia
3rd place, bronze medalist(s)		D. Smith	Great Britain

The Women's marathon 3 was a wheelchair marathon event in athletics at the 1984 Summer Paralympics. The race was won by Gabriele Beyer.

== Results ==
Place	Athlete	Time
1	Gabriele Beyer (FRG)	2:48:18
2	Julie Russell (AUS)	3:07:21
3	D. Smith (GBR)	4:00:37
4	M. D. L. A. Valdes (MEX)	-

== See also ==
- Marathon at the Paralympics
