= Archery at the 1984 Summer Paralympics – Men's double FITA round C3,C6 =

Men's double FITA Round C3,C6 at the VII Paralympic Games
- Paralympic Archery
- Competitors: 1 from 1 nation

Medalists
1st place, gold medalist(s)		Philip Thorne	Great Britain

The Men's double FITA round C3,C6 was an archery competition in the 1984 Summer Paralympics.

The British archer, Philip Thorne won the gold medal unopposed.

== Results ==
Rank	Athletes	Points
1st place, gold medalist(s)	Philip Thorne (GBR)	158
