= Roly Crichton =

New Zealand Paralympian

Roly Crichton ONZM
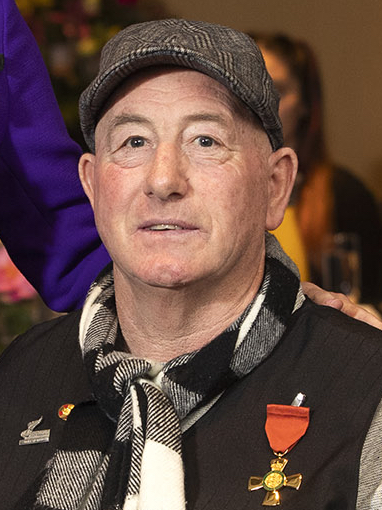
- Crichton in 2020

Personal information
- Full name: Ronald Crichton

Sport
- Country: New Zealand
- Sport: Swimming
Medal record
Men's para swimming
Representing New Zealand
Paralympic Games
| Gold medal – first place | 1984 New York & Stoke Mandeville | 50m Freestyle 2 |
| Silver medal – second place | 1984 New York & Stoke Mandeville | 200m Freestyle 2 |
| Silver medal – second place | 1984 New York & Stoke Mandeville | 25m Butterfly 2 |
| Silver medal – second place | 1988 Seoul | 200m Freestyle 2 |
| Bronze medal – third place | 1984 New York & Stoke Mandeville | 100m Individual Medley 2 |
| Bronze medal – third place | 1988 Seoul | 50m Freestyle 2 |

Ronald "Roly" Crichton ONZM is a New Zealand para-swimmer and coach. At the 1984 Summer Paralympics, he won a gold medal in the 50m Freestyle 2, silver medals in the 200m Freestyle 2 and 25m Butterfly 2, and a bronze medal in the 100m Individual Medley 2. At the 1988 Summer Paralympics, he won a silver medal in the 200m Freestyle 2 and a bronze medal in the 50m Freestyle 2.

Crichton is the former coach of para-swimmer Sophie Pascoe, and in the 2019 New Year Honours, he was made an Officer of the New Zealand Order of Merit for services to Paralympic sport.
