= Kenneth Cairns =

British swimmer

Kenneth Cairns MBE
Personal information
- Born: 20 December 1957 (age 68)

Sport
- Country: Great Britain
- Sport: Paralympic swimming
- Club: Port Glasgow Otters
- Coached by: Eddie McCluskey
Medal record
Paralympic Games
Swimming
Gold medal – first place	1984 Stoke Mandeville / New York	Men's 25 m Backstroke 1B
Gold medal – first place	1984 Stoke Mandeville / New York	Men's 25 m Breaststroke 1B
Gold medal – first place	1984 Stoke Mandeville / New York	Men's 25 m Freestyle 1B
Gold medal – first place	1984 Stoke Mandeville / New York	Men's 100 m Freestyle 1B
Gold medal – first place	2000 Sydney	Men's 100 m Freestyle S3
Silver medal – second place	1984 Stoke Mandeville / New York	Men's 3×25 m Individual Medley 1B
Silver medal – second place	1984 Stoke Mandeville / New York	Men's 3x25 m Freestyle Relay 1A-1C
Silver medal – second place	1992 Barcelona	Men's 150 m Medley SM3
Silver medal – second place	1996 Atlanta	Men's 50 m Butterfly S3
Silver medal – second place	2000 Sydney	Men's 200 m Freestyle S3
Silver medal – second place	2000 Sydney	Men's 50 m Freestyle S3
Bronze medal – third place	2000 Sydney	Men's 4×50 m Freestyle 20 pts
Bronze medal – third place	2004 Athens	Men's 4x50 m Freestyle 20 pts

Kenneth Cairns MBE (born 20 December 1957) is a British swimmer who won five Paralympic gold medals across five Games, along with several world titles. He broke several records in swimming events, and was appointed Member of the Order of the British Empire (MBE) in the 2001 New Year Honours for services to disabled sports.

Cairns was inducted into the Scottish Sports Hall of Fame in 2015, and into the Scottish Swimming Hall of Fame in 2018.

== Biography ==
At the age of 16 Cairns was involved in a motorcycle accident which resulted in damage to his spine, after which he began using a wheelchair. He began swimming to improve his fitness in 1976 and, at the National Stoke Mandeville Games the following year, won all of the swimming events that he entered. Before dedicating his time fully to swimming he chose to go to college and finish his education. He returned to the pool in 1982 and began competed in class S3 events up until he retired due to ill health just before the 2008 Paralympic Games in Beijing. When not swimming Cairns is a keen harmonica player who regularly competes in the annual National Championships in Bristol. In 2009 he won in the jazz section.

Cairns made his Paralympic Games debut in 1984, winning four gold medals, one individual silver, and a team silver in the relay. While this would prove to be his greatest Paralympic performance he was able to win at least one medal in every Paralympic Games from 1992 to 2004, finding particular success in the freestyle events. Between 1990 and 2006 Cairns won 16 medals in World Championship competitions, including 7 golds, and 21 medals in European Championships until 2001. He swam relay events with Mike Kenny and Sascha Kindred amongst others.

Now retired, Cairns continues to support swimming galas around the country that are organised by Scottish Disability Sport. At one such event Cairns met and inspired Andrew Mullen who went on to find World Championship and Paralympic swimming success.
