= China at the 1984 Summer Paralympics =

- IPC code: CHN
- NPC: China Administration of Sports for Persons with Disabilities
- Website: www.caspd.org.cn

in Stoke Mandeville/New York
- Competitors: 24 in 3 sports
- Medals Ranked 28th: Gold 2 Silver 12 Bronze 8 Total 22

Summer Paralympics appearances (overview)
- 1984; 1988; 1992; 1996; 2000; 2004; 2008; 2012; 2016; 2020; 2024

China competed at the 1984 Summer Paralympics, held in New York City, United States and in Stoke Mandeville, United Kingdom. This was China's debut at the summer Paralympics. The country sent 24 athletes who competed in three sports: athletics, swimming, and table tennis.

Chinese competitors won two gold medals, twelve silver, and eight bronze, placing China 23rd on the medal table. Ping Yali won China's first ever Paralympic gold medal.

== Medalists ==
Medal	Name	Sport	Event
Gold	Ping Yali	Athletics	Women's long jump B2
Gold	Zhao Jihong	Athletics	Women's long jump B3
Silver	Zheng Jieping	Athletics	Men's long jump A5
Silver	Zhen Yu Yao	Athletics	Men's shot put A4
Silver	Zhao Jihong	Athletics	Women's 100m B3
Silver	Zhao Jihong	Athletics	Women's high jump B3
Silver	Wang Shuyun	Athletics	Women's javelin throw A6
Silver	Li Miqiang	Swimming	Men's 50m breaststroke B2
Silver	Zhang Xian	Swimming	Men's 100m backstroke A3
Silver	Zhang Xian	Swimming	Men's 100m breaststroke A3
Silver	Zhang Xian	Swimming	Men's 100m butterfly A3
Silver	Zhang Xian	Swimming	Men's 200m individual medley A3
Silver	Li Miqiang	Swimming	Men's 400m breaststroke B2
Silver	Wang Shuyun	Table tennis	Women's singles L5
Bronze	Zhao Bin	Athletics	Men's discus throw A3
Bronze	Ping Yali	Athletics	Women's 100m B2
Bronze	Zhao Jihong	Athletics	Women's 400m B3
Bronze	Wang Shuyun	Athletics	Women's discus throw A6
Bronze	Shen Jiliang	Swimming	Men's 100m backstroke A7
Bronze	Cao Qianming	Swimming	Men's 100m butterfly A1
Bronze	Shen Jiliang	Swimming	Men's 100m freestyle A7
Bronze	Cao Qianming	Swimming	Men's 200m individual medley A1

== See also ==
- China at the Paralympics
- China at the 1984 Summer Olympics
- Sports in China
