= Josée Lake =

Canadian Paralympic swimmer

Personal information
- Born: 1963-1964 Montreal, Canada

Sport
- Sport: Swimming
Medal record
Representing Canada
Paralympic Games
Gold medal – first place	1980 Arnhem	50m freestyle J
Gold medal – first place	1980 Arnhem	50m backstroke J
Gold medal – first place	1980 Arnhem	50m breaststroke J
Gold medal – first place	1984 Stoke Mandeville / New York	50m backstroke A9
Gold medal – first place	1984 Stoke Mandeville / New York	50m breaststroke A9
Gold medal – first place	1984 Stoke Mandeville / New York	100m freestyle A9
Gold medal – first place	1984 Stoke Mandeville / New York	150m individual medley A9

Josée Lake (born 1963 or 1964) is a Canadian paralympic gold medallist swimmer, and thalidomide survivor. In 2019, she served as president of the Thalidomide Victims Association of Canada.

== Personal life ==
Lake was born in Montreal, in the Villeray neighbourhood, in 1963. She has no right hand or foot, and her left foot has no arch and only three toes. After her swimming career she worked as a social worker in the area of suicide prevention. She has three children.

== Swimming career ==
Lake started to learn to swim at the age of five, having to travel long distances to find classes which would accept a child with a disability. At the 1980 Summer Paralympics she won gold in Women's 50 m Backstroke J, Women's 50 m Breaststroke J and Women's 50 m Freestyle J. At the 1984 Summer Paralympics she won gold in the Women's 100 m Freestyle A9, the Women's 50 m Backstroke A9, the Women's 50 m Breaststroke A9 and the Women's 150 m Individual Medley A9. She retired from swimming in 1986. In 2012 she was inducted into Swimming Canada's Circle of Excellence, an honour given to the "greatest Canadian swimmers of all time".

== Thalidomide ==
In 2019, Lake became president of the Thalidomide Victims Association of Canada, a group for people suffering the effects of the drug thalidomide which was given to pregnant women and caused birth defects. She has said that she hopes "that TVAC will continue to use its voice to promote pharmacovigilance, so that the thalidomide tragedy will never be forgotten. I believe that by sharing our history, as Thalidomide survivors, TVAC can help make our world a much safer place for unborn children."
