= Patricia Hennin =

Canadian multi-sport athlete

Personal information
- National team: Canada
- Born: 1963 or 1964 (age 61–62) Windsor, Ontario, Canada

Sport
- Country: Canada
- Sport: Para-swimming
- Disability: Cerebral palsy
- Disability class: C4
- Team: Windsor Bulldogs
- Coached by: Doug Wilton
Medal record
Women's Para-swimming
Representing Canada
Event	1st	2nd	3rd
Paralympic Games	0	2	1
Total	0	2	1
Paralympic Games
Silver medal – second place	1984 New York City	Women's 50 m freestyle C4
Silver medal – second place	1984 New York City	Women's 200 m freestyle C4
Bronze medal – third place	1984 New York City	Women's 100 m freestyle C4

Patricia Hennin (born in either 1963 or 1964) is a Canadian C4-category Paralympic swimmer, track and field athlete and para association football player who has the brain disease cerebral palsy that has paralyzed her legs. She won silver medals in each of the women's 50-metre and 200-metre freestyle C4 competitions and a single bronze medal in the women's 100 freestyle C4 event at the 1984 Summer Paralympics in New York City. Hennin also won medals at the regional and national level in both Canada and the United States, setting multiple class records.

== Biography ==
Hennin was born in either 1963 or 1964, and comes from Windsor, Ontario. She is a graduate of William Hands Secondary School and of St. Clair College, where she qualified to be a medical secretary. Hennin had cerebral palsy that has caused her legs to be paralyzed. She competed in the C4 category in track and field events, and was trained by coach Doug Wilton. Hennin commenced competitive swimming when she was 14 years old, and she would be encouraged by her parents to train despite their initial apprehension she would be injured doing swimming.

She won five gold medals in the D cerebral palsy division at the 1980 Regional Games for the Physically Disabled in Brantford. Hennin claimed four gold medals in the 50-metre freestyle swimming, the 100-metre sprint, the pentathlon and shot put with a new United States record of 12.5 ft (3.8 m) throw and won two silver medals at the Michigan International Games for Cerebral Palsy Athletes at Ypsilanti, Michigan. At the Ontario Games for the Physically Disabled at Sault Ste. Marie, Ontario, she took five gold medals in the 25, 50, 100-metre freestyle swimming and the 60-metre wheelchair dash and the discus throw events and recorded four new Ontario records.

Hennin took four gold medals in the 50 and 100-metre freestyle swimming, the 100-metre wheelchair and the club throw competitions and three silver medals in the 4 x 25-metre swimming relay, the discus throw and the 200-metre sprint at the 1981 World Invitational Cerebral Palsy Games at Nottingham, England. At the 1981 United States National Cerebral Palsy Championships in Kingston, Rhode Island, Hennin set three new American records in the 25-metre and 50-metre freestyle swimming competitions and in the discus throw. She was part of the Windsor soccer team that won the gold medal in the cerebral palsy division with victories over Toronto and Michigan Tri-City at the 1982 Windsor Classic Games for the Physically Disabled.

As a member of the Windsor Bulldogs at the 1982 Regional Games for Disabled Athletes, Hennin won the gold medal in each of the 25, 50, 100-metre freestyle swimming, the discus throw and the 200-metre dash competitions. She earned 1982 Disabled Athlete of the Year honors for both Ontario and Windsor. She earned five more medals in the 25, 50 and 100-metre freestyle swimming as well as the 200 and 400-metre sprints at the 1983 Ontario Games for the Physically Disabled in Brampton. Hennin went on to claim a further four gold medals in the 50 and 100-metre freestyle swimming, the 800-metre and the discus throw events at that year's United States National Championships and earned selection to the 1984 Summer Paralympic Games training camp.

In May 1984, she was accepted as a member of the Canadian Paralympic team at the 1984 Summer Paralympics held in New York City the following month after winning four gold medals at the 50-metre freestyle, 50-metre backstroke, discus and the 4 x 50-metre freestyle competitions at the Michigan Regional Cerebral Palsy Games. Hennin won the silver medal in each of the women's 50-metre and 200-metre freestyle C4 events and a single bronze medal in the women's 100 freestyle C4 events. She also competed in the women's discus throw C4 and women's 100-metre backstroke C4 competitions where she finished fifth and fourth respectively.
