= Rick Resa =

American Paralympic athlete

Medal record

Representing United States

Paralympic Games

Swimming
Gold medal – first place	1984 New York / Stoke Mandeville	Men's 25 m Freestyle with Aids C1

Rick Resa is a paralympic athlete from the United States competing mainly in category C2 events.

Resa competed in the 1984 Summer Paralympics in athletics and swimming. In swimming, he won a gold medal in Men's 25 m Freestyle with Aids C1.
