= Isabel Newstead =

British Paralympic swimmer

Medal record

Representing United Kingdom

Paralympic Games

Women's para swimming
Gold medal – first place	1980 Arnhem	25 m backstroke
Gold medal – first place	1980 Arnhem	25 m breastroke
Gold medal – first place	1980 Arnhem	25 m freestyle
Gold medal – first place	1984 Stoke Mandeville	25 m breaststroke
Gold medal – first place	1984 Stoke Mandeville	25 m butterfly
Gold medal – first place	1984 Stoke Mandeville	3 x 25 m individual medley
Silver medal – second place	1984 Stoke Mandeville	100 m freestyle
Bronze medal – third place	1984 Stoke Mandeville	25 m backstroke
Bronze medal – third place	1984 Stoke Mandeville	25 m freestyle

Women's shooting para sport
Gold medal – first place	1984 Stoke Mandeville	air pistol
Gold medal – first place	2000 Sydney	air pistol
Gold medal – first place	2004 Athens	air pistol
Bronze medal – third place	1988 Seoul	air pistol

Women's para athletics
Gold medal – first place	1988 Seoul	discus
Silver medal – second place	1984 Stoke Mandeville	shot put
Silver medal – second place	1984 Stoke Mandeville	discus
Silver medal – second place	1988 Seoul	shot put
Bronze medal – third place	1988 Seoul	javelin

Isabel Newstead, MBE (née Barr; 3 May 1955 – 18 January 2007) was a British paralympic athlete who competed at seven consecutive Paralympic Games from 1980 to 2004. Overall, Newstead won ten gold, four silver and four bronze medals in three different sports. She was inducted into the Scottish Sports Hall of Fame in 2008.

== Career ==
Isabel Barr was born in Glasgow, Scotland. At the age of nineteen her spinal cord was damaged by a flu virus, which would eventually lead to tetraplegia, partial or complete paralysis of all four limbs. Newstead had already competed at regional level before her illness and as part of her rehabilitation continued swimming. Whilst swimming with the Port Glasgow Otters Swimming Club she was noticed by the British paraplegic swimming team. Newstead moved to Harlow, Essex in the late seventies to work as a systems analyst with Rank Hovis McDougall.

At her first 1980 Summer Paralympics in Arnhem, Newstead won three gold medals in the swimming pool. At the 1984 Summer Paralympics in Stoke Mandeville she won three golds and a silver medal in the pool. Most notably, Newstead also won a gold in the air pistol shooting event as well as silver medals in the shot put and discus events.

Newstead did not compete in the swimming events at the 1988 Summer Paralympics in Seoul due to health challenges. However, she did win a silver medal in the shot put and two bronzes in the air pistol and javelin events. She married John Newstead after the Seoul games, having previously competed as Isabel Barr.

Newstead competed at the 1992 Summer Paralympics in Barcelona and the 1996 Summer Paralympics in Atlanta, though she did not win any medals. In Barcelona, an error by her coach led to her missing the final of one event, when she was in the lead after the preliminary rounds. In Atlanta, on the eve of the opening ceremony, Newstead fell from her wheelchair and required surgery on a broken hip. Undeterred, she completed her event but finished outside the medals.

At the 2000 Summer Paralympics in Sydney, Newstead won Gold in the air pistol SH1 category. She defended her title four years later at the 2004 Summer Paralympics in Athens, setting a world-record score. In The New Year Honours 2001 Newstead was appointed a Member of the Order of the British Empire for services to Disabled Sport.

In 2006 Newstead was diagnosed with cancer and died in January 2007. She was in the process of training to defend her shooting title in Beijing and learning Mandarin.

== Awards ==
Inducted into Scottish Women in Sport Hall of Fame in 2018.

== See also ==
- List of multiple Paralympic gold medalists
- List of multiple Paralympic gold medalists at a single Games
