= Krzysztof Ślęczka =

Polish Paralympic swimmer

Personal information
- Born: 18 July 1956 Czechowice-Dziedzice, Poland
- Died: 7 April 2022 (aged 65)

Sport
- Country: Poland
- Sport: Paralympic swimming
- Disability class: S5, SM4, SB4
- Club: Delfin Masters, Tarnobrzeg
Medal record
Paralympic swimming
Representing Poland
Paralympic Games
Gold medal – first place	1984 Stoke Mandeville / New York	Men's 25m backstroke 1C
Gold medal – first place	1984 Stoke Mandeville / New York	Men's 25m breaststroke 1C
Gold medal – first place	1984 Stoke Mandeville / New York	Men's 100m freestyle 1C
Gold medal – first place	1984 Stoke Mandeville / New York	Men's 3x25m individual medley 1C
Gold medal – first place	1988 Seoul	Men's 25m backstroke 1C
Gold medal – first place	1992 Barcelona	Men's 150m individual medley SM4
Silver medal – second place	1984 Stoke Mandeville / New York	Men's 25m freestyle 1C
Silver medal – second place	1988 Seoul	Men's 25m breaststroke 1C
Silver medal – second place	1988 Seoul	Men's 50m freestyle 1C
Silver medal – second place	1988 Seoul	Men's 100m freestyle 1C
Silver medal – second place	1992 Barcelona	Men's 50m freestyle S5
Silver medal – second place	1992 Barcelona	Men's 100m freestyle S5
Silver medal – second place	1992 Barcelona	Men's 50m backstroke S5
Silver medal – second place	2000 Sydney	Men's 150m individual medley SM4
Bronze medal – third place	1996 Atlanta	Men's 50m freestyle S5
Bronze medal – third place	1996 Atlanta	Men's 100m freestyle S5
Bronze medal – third place	1996 Atlanta	Men's 200m freestyle S5
Bronze medal – third place	2000 Sydney	Men's 50m backstroke S5
World Championships
Silver medal – second place	1994 Malta	Men's 50m backstroke S5
Silver medal – second place	1994 Malta	Men's 50m breaststroke SB3
Silver medal – second place	1994 Malta	Men's 150m individual medley SM3-4
Silver medal – second place	1998 Christchurch	Men's 50m freestyle S5
Silver medal – second place	1998 Christchurch	Men's 100m freestyle S5
Silver medal – second place	1998 Christchurch	Men's 50m backstroke S5
Silver medal – second place	1998 Christchurch	Men's 150m individual medley SM4
Silver medal – second place	1998 Christchurch	Men's 4x50m medley open
Bronze medal – third place	1998 Christchurch	Men's 200m freestyle S5

Krzysztof Ślęczka (18 July 1956 - 7 April 2022) was a Polish Paralympic swimmer who competed in international level events.
