= Jane Stidever =

British Paralympic swimmer and equestrian

Personal information
- Born: 15 January 1966 (age 60) Cyprus

Sport
- Country: United Kingdom
- Sport: Paralympic swimming and equestrianism
- Club: Leicester Penguins
Medal record
Representing Great Britain
Paralympic Games
Women's para swimming
Gold medal – first place	1988 Seoul	4x50 m Medley S1-6
Gold medal – first place	1988 Seoul	400 m Freestyle C3-4
Gold medal – first place	1996 Atlanta	4x50 m Freestyle S1-6
Gold medal – first place	2004 Athens	4x50 m Medley 20 pts
Silver medal – second place	1984 New York	100 m Freestyle C4
Silver medal – second place	1988 Seoul	100 m Breaststroke C4
Silver medal – second place	1988 Seoul	100 m Freestyle C4
Silver medal – second place	1988 Seoul	200 m Freestyle C4
Silver medal – second place	2004 Athens	4x50 m Freestyle 20 pts
Bronze medal – third place	1984 New York	200 m Freestyle C4
Bronze medal – third place	1984 New York	50 m Freestyle C4
Bronze medal – third place	1992 Barcelona	100 m Backstroke C4
Bronze medal – third place	1996 Atlanta	50 m Backstroke S5
Bronze medal – third place	2000 Sydney	4x50 m Medley 20 pts
Para equestrian
Gold medal – first place	1984 New York	Mixed Dressage - Elementary Walk/Trot C4-5

Jane Stidever (born 15 January 1966) is a retired Paralympic swimmer and equestrian. She competed in six Paralympics and won five gold medals. Stidever won her first Paralympic medals in 1984, representing Great Britain in both the swimming and the dressage. She did not continue with her equestrian success but went on to win four gold medals in swimming events between 1988 and 2004.
