= James Muirhead (swimmer) =

British Paralympic swimmer

Personal information
- Born: 21 September 1953 (age 72)
- Died: 17 October 2021 (aged 68)

Sport
- Country: Great Britain
- Sport: Paralympic swimming
Medal record
Paralympic Games
Swimming
Gold medal – first place	1976 Toronto	Men's 100 m Butterfly A
Gold medal – first place	1976 Toronto	Men's 4x100 m Individual Medley A
Gold medal – first place	1980 Arnhem	Men's 100 m Freestyle A
Gold medal – first place	1980 Arnhem	Men's 100 m Backstroke A
Gold medal – first place	1984 Stoke Mandeville / New York	Men's 100 m Butterfly B1
Silver medal – second place	1976 Toronto	Men's 100 m Freestyle A
Silver medal – second place	1976 Toronto	Men's 100 m Backstroke A
Silver medal – second place	1980 Arnhem	Men's 100 m Butterfly A
Silver medal – second place	1980 Arnhem	Men's 4x100 m Individual Medley A
Silver medal – second place	1984 Stoke Mandeville / New York	Men's 100 m Freestyle B1
Bronze medal – third place	1984 Stoke Mandeville / New York	Men's 400 m Freestyle B1
Bronze medal – third place	1984 Stoke Mandeville / New York	Men's 100 m Backstroke B1
Bronze medal – third place	1984 Stoke Mandeville / New York	Men's 200 m Individual Medley B1

James Muirhead (21 September 1953 - 17 October 2021) was a British Paralympic swimmer who won thirteen medals at the Summer Paralympic Games. His Paralympic debut was at the 1976 Summer Paralympics where he won two gold medals and two silvers. Muirhead repeated that feat in Arnhem for the 1980 Games, albeit in different events. He returned from the 1984 Summer Paralympics with a fifth gold, another silver, and three bronze medals.

Muirhead lost his sight at age 17. He qualified and worked as a physiotherapist.

He died of cancer in October 2021. He is still the most decorated Scottish Paralympic swimmer of all time.
