= Steven Varden =

British Paralympic athlete

Sport
- Country: United Kingdom
- Sport: Para-athletics; Paralympic swimming

Steven Varden is a British Paralympic athlete and swimmer. He won the bronze medal in the men's shot put C2 event at the 1984 Summer Paralympics. He also competed in swimming and he won the silver medal in the men's 25 metre freestyle with aids C2 event.

In 1988, he won the silver medal in the men's club throw C2 event at the 1988 Summer Paralympics held in Seoul, South Korea.
