= Manuela Aguilera =

Spanish paralympic swimmer

Sport
- Country: Spain
- Sport: Paralympic swimming
Medal record
Paralympic swimming
Representing Spain
Paralympic Games
| Gold medal – first place | 1984 Stoke Mandeville/New York | 100m backstroke L6 |
| Gold medal – first place | 1984 Stoke Mandeville/New York | 200m individual medley L6 |
| Silver medal – second place | 1984 Stoke Mandeville/New York | 100m freestyle L6 |

Manuela Aguilera is a Spanish Paralympic swimmer. She won three medals at the 1984 New York and Stoke Mandeville Paralympics.

== Career ==
At the 1984 Summer Paralympics, she won a gold medal in the 100 meters backstroke L6, and 200 meters individual medley L6. She won a silver medal in the 100 meters freestyle L6.
