= Shlomo Pinto =

Israeli Paralympic swimmer

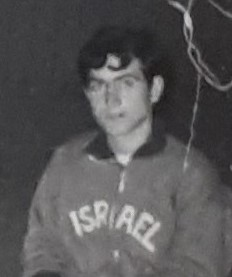

Personal information
- Native name: שלמה פינטו

Sport
- Country: Israel
Medal record
Representing Israel
Summer Paralympic Games
Swimming
Gold medal – first place	1976 Toronto	3x50m medley relay
Gold medal – first place	1980 Arnhem	4X50 freestyle relay
Gold medal – first place	1984 New York	400m freestyle 4
Gold medal – first place	1984 New York	4X50 freestyle relay
Gold medal – first place	1988 Seoul	100m freestyle 4
Gold medal – first place	1988 Seoul	50m butterfly 4
Gold medal – first place	1988 Seoul	200m individual medley
Silver medal – second place	1976 Toronto	50m freestyle 4
Silver medal – second place	1980 Arnhem	100m freestyle 4
Silver medal – second place	1980 Arnhem	3X50 medley relay
Silver medal – second place	1984 New York	100m freestyle 4
Silver medal – second place	1984 New York	4x50m individual medley
Silver medal – second place	1984 New York	100m backstroke 4
Silver medal – second place	1984 New York	50m butterfly 4
Silver medal – second place	1988 Seoul	100m breaststroke 4
Silver medal – second place	1988 Seoul	400m freestyle 4
Bronze medal – third place	1976 Toronto	25m butterfly 4
Bronze medal – third place	1988 Seoul	4X100 medley relay
Bronze medal – third place	1992 Barcelona	4X100 freestyle relay
Men's wheelchair basketball
Gold medal – first place	1980 Arnhem	Wheelchair basketball

Shlomo Pinto (Hebrew: שלמה פינטו) was an Israeli paralympic champion.

Pinto was a soldier with the IDF's Golani Brigade during the Yom Kippur War. Injured during the battle at Mount Hermon, his legs were paralyzed and Pinto began practicing sports with the IDF Disabled Veterans' Organization.

Pinto practiced badminton, wheelchair basketball and swimming, representing Israel in the latter field in all Paralympic Games between 1976 and 1992 and winning 20 medals.

Pinto died 18 June 2011 at the age of 57, several weeks after suffering a brain seizure.
