= Martin Mansell =

British Paralympic athlete and swimmer

Personal information
- Nationality: Great Britain
- Born: 13 December 1960 (age 65)
Medal record
Representing Great Britain
Paralympic Games
Swimming
Gold medal – first place	1984 New York / Stoke Mandeville	Men's 50 m Backstroke C5
Gold medal – first place	1988 Seoul	Men's 100 m Backstroke C5
Silver medal – second place	1984 New York / Stoke Mandeville	Men's 100 m Backstroke C5
Silver medal – second place	1984 New York / Stoke Mandeville	Men's 100 m Freestyle C5
Silver medal – second place	1984 New York / Stoke Mandeville	Men's 200 m Freestyle C5
Silver medal – second place	1988 Seoul	Men's 200 m Freestyle C5
Silver medal – second place	1988 Seoul	Men's 200 m Individual Medley C5
Bronze medal – third place	1988 Seoul	Men's 200 m Backstroke C5

Martin Mansell (born 13 December 1960) is a former Paralympic athlete from Great Britain competing mainly in swimming.

Mansell represented Great Britain at the 1984 and 1988 Summer Paralympics in athletics and swimming. In swimming Mansell won three gold medals 2 in the backstroke and 1 in relay.

In 1990, Mansell was appointed as one of the first Professional Sports Development Officers for People with Disabilities within a Local Education Authority in England as a result of the sports ministers' report.

He also set up and chaired the first Athletes Committee for the Newly formed British Paralympic Association and the International Paralympic committee from 1989-1996.
