= Ana María Peiró =

Athlete

Personal information
- Born: Barcelona, Spain

Sport
- Country: Spain
- Sport: Paralympic swimming
- Disability: Polio
Medal record
Paralympic swimming
Representing Spain
Paralympic Games
Gold medal – first place	1984 Stoke Mandeville/New York	100m backstroke L4
Gold medal – first place	1984 Stoke Mandeville/New York	100m butterfly L4
Gold medal – first place	1984 Stoke Mandeville/New York	200m individual medley L4
Gold medal – first place	1988 Seoul	100m freestyle 5
Gold medal – first place	1988 Seoul	400m freestyle 5
Gold medal – first place	1988 Seoul	100m backstroke 5
Bronze medal – third place	1984 Stoke Mandeville/New York	100m freestyle L4
Bronze medal – third place	1984 Stoke Mandeville/New York	100m breaststroke L4

Ana María Peiró is a Spanish paralympic athlete who competed in Para swimming. She won eight medals at the 1984 Summer Paralympics and 1988 Summer Paralympics.

== Career ==
At the 1984 Summer Paralympics, she won a gold medal in the 100 meter backstroke L4, 100 meter butterfly L4, and 200 meter medley L4. She won a bronze medal in 100 meter breaststroke L4, and 100 meter freestyle L4.

At the 1988 Summer Paralympics, in Seoul, she won a gold medal, in 100 meter backstroke 5, 100 meter freestyle 5, and 400 meter freestyle 5.
