= Helen Hilderley =

British Paralympic athlete

Sport
- Country: United Kingdom
- Sport: Para-archery; Para-athletics

Helen Hilderley is a British Paralympic athlete. In 1984, she won one silver medal and three bronze medals in athletics at the 1984 Summer Paralympics.

She also competed in archery and she won the gold medal in the women's double FITA round division 3 event.
