= Mike Kenny (swimmer) =

British swimmer (born 1945)

Mike Kenny MBE
Personal information
- Born: 30 January 1945 (age 81)

Sport
- Country: Great Britain
- Sport: Paralympic swimming
- Retired: 1988
Medal record
Paralympic Games
Gold medal – first place	1976 Toronto	25 m Back. 1A
Gold medal – first place	1976 Toronto	25 m Breast. 1A
Gold medal – first place	1976 Toronto	25 m Free. 1A
Gold medal – first place	1980 Arnhem	25 m Back. 1A
Gold medal – first place	1980 Arnhem	25 m Breast. 1A
Gold medal – first place	1980 Arnhem	25 m Free. 1A
Gold medal – first place	1984 Stoke M'ville	100 m Free. 1A
Gold medal – first place	1984 Stoke M'ville	25 m Back. 1A
Gold medal – first place	1984 Stoke M'ville	25 m Breast. 1A
Gold medal – first place	1984 Stoke M'ville	25 m Free. 1A
Gold medal – first place	1984 Stoke M'ville	3x25 m Ind. Med. 1B
Gold medal – first place	1988 Seoul	100 m Free. 1A
Gold medal – first place	1988 Seoul	25 m Back. 1A
Gold medal – first place	1988 Seoul	25 m Breast. 1A
Gold medal – first place	1988 Seoul	50 m Free. 1A
Gold medal – first place	1988 Seoul	75 m Ind. Med. 1A
Silver medal – second place	1984 Stoke M'ville	3x25 m Free. Relay 1A-1C
Silver medal – second place	1988 Seoul	3×25 m Free. Relay 1A-1C

Mike Kenny, MBE (born 30 January 1945) is a retired British swimmer. He won 16 gold medals and two silvers over four Paralympic Games, making him the second most successful British Paralympian of all time. He twice retained his gold medals in three swimming events, breaking numerous world records in the process.

== Biography ==
Michael Joseph Kenny was born on 30 January 1945. Kenny was an engineer in the nuclear power industry and in 1971, while working a shift as a favour for a friend, he fell from the ladder he was using to work on a metal rig. He landed on his heels and the force was sent straight up his spine to his neck causing permanent damage and paralysing him. He began swimming as part of the recovery process.

While competing at the Toronto 1976 Paralympic Games, Kenny shared a room with future International Paralympic Committee (IPC) president Philip Craven, in Canada's York University, where the British athletes were housed. He did not attend the University of York in the UK, as is often mistakenly asserted.

Kenny is one of the most successful British Paralympians, having won 16 individual gold medals and two team relay silver medals. His achievements were not fully recognised at the time because the IPC and the British Paralympic Association were not established until 1989 and the results were not compiled until after Kenny had retired. Wheelchair racer Tanni Grey-Thompson was given the title of Britain's most prolific Paralympian until the discovery of Kenny's successes. Regarding Grey-Thompson, Kenny has said:

"It's been suggested I am annoyed because she has all the glory. But that's not true. She is a smashing ambassador for the Paralympic movement and I have never had a cross word with her in my life."

Kenny has been a local magistrate in Salford, Greater Manchester since 1993. He initially applied to become a magistrate upon his retirement from sport in 1988, but had to wait four years for step-free access to be installed. Kenny received an MBE for his services to paraplegic sport at Buckingham Palace on 7 November 1989.

=== Swimming results ===
In 1973, Kenny started competing at national level, entering his first Paralympics in 1976 in Toronto. He took part in three 25 m class 1A swimming events (backstroke, breaststroke, and freestyle) winning gold in each of them and taking the world record in the freestyle and backstroke events. He defended all three titles in 1980 and once again broke the freestyle and backstroke world records. In 1984 he again won gold in those three events, breaking the world records in each one. He also won the 3 × 25 m individual medley and was part of the Great Britain relay team who won silver in the 3 × 25 m Free. Relay. He repeated his successes in 1988 winning five individual golds and a relay silver but did not improve on his times and retired from competitive swimming after the Games.
