= Japan at the 1984 Summer Paralympics =

- IPC code: JPN
- NPC: Japan Paralympic Committee
- Website: www.jsad.or.jp (in Japanese)

in Stoke Mandeville/New York
- Competitors: 37
- Medals Ranked 22nd: Gold 9 Silver 7 Bronze 8 Total 24

Summer Paralympics appearances (overview)
- 1964; 1968; 1972; 1976; 1980; 1984; 1988; 1992; 1996; 2000; 2004; 2008; 2012; 2016; 2020; 2024

Japan competed at the 1984 Summer Paralympics in Stoke Mandeville, Great Britain and New York City, United States. 37 competitors from Japan won 24 medals including 9 gold, 7 silver and 8 bronze and finished 22nd in the medal table.

== See also ==
- Japan at the Paralympics
- Japan at the 1984 Summer Olympics
