= Kuwait at the 1984 Summer Paralympics =

- IPC code: KUW
- NPC: Kuwait Paralympic Committee

in Stoke Mandeville/New York
- Competitors: 22
- Medals Ranked 31st: Gold 1 Silver 3 Bronze 4 Total 8

Summer Paralympics appearances (overview)
- 1980; 1984; 1988; 1992; 1996; 2000; 2004; 2008; 2012; 2016; 2020; 2024

Kuwait competed at the 1984 Summer Paralympics in Stoke Mandeville, Great Britain and New York City, United States. 22 competitors from Kuwait won 8 medals including 1 gold, 3 silver and 4 bronze and finished 31st in the medal table.

== See also ==
- Kuwait at the Paralympics
- Kuwait at the 1984 Summer Olympics
