= Denmark at the 1984 Summer Paralympics =

- IPC code: DEN
- NPC: Paralympic Committee Denmark
- Website: www.paralympic.dk

in Stoke Mandeville/New York
- Competitors: 36
- Medals Ranked 11th: Gold 30 Silver 13 Bronze 16 Total 59

Summer Paralympics appearances (overview)
- 1968; 1972; 1976; 1980; 1984; 1988; 1992; 1996; 2000; 2004; 2008; 2012; 2016; 2020; 2024

Denmark competed at the 1984 Summer Paralympics in Stoke Mandeville, Great Britain and New York City, United States. 36 competitors from Denmark won 59 medals including 30 gold, 13 silver and 16 bronze and finished 11th in the medal table.

== See also ==
- Denmark at the Paralympics
- Denmark at the 1984 Summer Olympics
