= Sweden at the 1984 Summer Paralympics =

- IPC code: SWE
- NPC: Swedish Parasports Federation

in Stoke Mandeville/New York
- Competitors: 97
- Medals Ranked 4th: Gold 83 Silver 43 Bronze 34 Total 160

Summer Paralympics appearances (overview)
- 1960; 1964; 1968; 1972; 1976; 1980; 1984; 1988; 1992; 1996; 2000; 2004; 2008; 2012; 2016; 2020; 2024

Sweden competed at the 1984 Summer Paralympics in Stoke Mandeville, Great Britain and New York City, United States. 97 competitors from Sweden won 160 medals including 83 gold, 43 silver and 34 bronze and finished 4th in the medal table.

== See also ==
- Sweden at the Paralympics
- Sweden at the 1984 Summer Olympics
