= Poland at the 1984 Summer Paralympics =

- IPC code: POL
- NPC: Polish Paralympic Committee
- Website: www.paralympic.org.pl

in Stoke Mandeville/New York
- Competitors: 34
- Medals Ranked 9th: Gold 46 Silver 39 Bronze 21 Total 106

Summer Paralympics appearances (overview)
- 1972; 1976; 1980; 1984; 1988; 1992; 1996; 2000; 2004; 2008; 2012; 2016; 2020; 2024

Poland competed at the 1984 Summer Paralympics in Stoke Mandeville, Great Britain and New York City, United States. 34 competitors from Poland won 106 medals including 46 gold, 39 silver and 21 bronze, finishing 9th in the medal table.

== See also ==
- Poland at the Paralympics
- Poland at the 1984 Summer Olympics
