= Netherlands at the 1984 Summer Paralympics =

- Flag of the Netherlands
- IPC code: NED (HOL used at these Games)
- NPC: Nederlands Olympisch Comité * Nederlandse Sport Federatie
- Website: paralympisch.nl (in Dutch)

in Stoke Mandeville/New York
- Competitors: 61 (40 men and 21 women)
- Medals Ranked 7th: Gold 55 Silver 52 Bronze 28 Total 135

Summer Paralympics appearances (overview)
- 1960; 1964; 1968; 1972; 1976; 1980; 1984; 1988; 1992; 1996; 2000; 2004; 2008; 2012; 2016; 2020; 2024

Netherlands competed at the 1984 Summer Paralympics in Stoke Mandeville/New York City, United States. The team included 61 athletes, 40 men and 21 women. Competitors from Netherlands won 135 medals, including 55 gold, 52 silver and 28 bronze to finish 7th in the medal table.

== See also ==
- Netherlands at the Paralympics
- Netherlands at the 1984 Summer Olympics
