= West Germany at the 1984 Summer Paralympics =

- Flag of Germany
- IPC code: FRG
- NPC: National Paralympic Committee Germany
- Website: www.dbs-npc.de (in German)

in Stoke Mandeville/New York
- Competitors: 142
- Medals Ranked 5th: Gold 81 Silver 76 Bronze 75 Total 232

Summer Paralympics appearances (overview)
- 1960; 1964; 1968; 1972; 1976; 1980; 1984; 1988; 1992; 1996; 2000; 2004; 2008; 2012; 2016; 2020; 2024

Other related appearances
- East Germany (1984)

West Germany competed at the 1984 Summer Paralympics in Stoke Mandeville, Great Britain and New York City, United States. 142 competitors from West Germany won 232 medals including 81 gold, 76 silver and 75 bronze and finished 5th in the medal table.

== See also ==
- West Germany at the Paralympics
- West Germany at the 1984 Summer Olympics
