= Stoke Mandeville =

Village in Buckinghamshire, England

Coordinates: 51.7861°N 0.7914°W

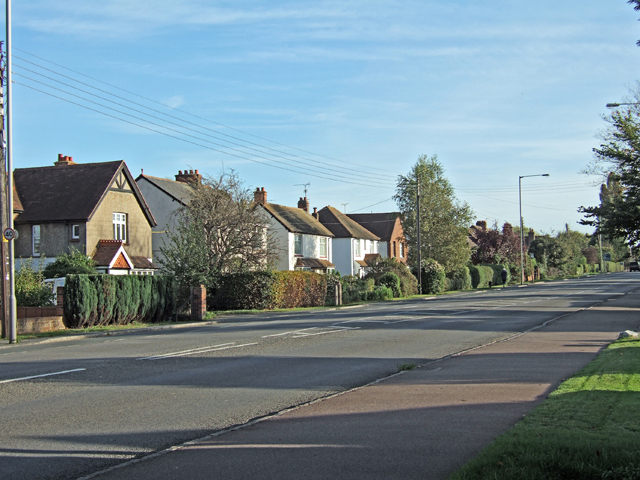
- The A413 in Stoke Mandeville, going towards Wendover

- Location within Buckinghamshire
- Population: 5,825 (2011 Census)
- OS grid reference: SP835105
- Civil parish: Stoke Mandeville
- Unitary authority: Buckinghamshire
- Ceremonial county: Buckinghamshire
- Region: South East
- Country: England
- Sovereign state: United Kingdom
- Post town: AYLESBURY
- Postcode district: HP22
- Dialling code: 01296
- Police: Thames Valley
- Fire: Buckinghamshire
- Ambulance: South Central
- UK Parliament: Mid Buckinghamshire

Stoke Mandeville is a village and civil parish in the Vale of Aylesbury in Buckinghamshire, England. It is located three miles (5 km) from Aylesbury and 3.4 miles (5.5 km) from the market town of Wendover. Although a separate civil parish, the village falls within the Aylesbury Urban Area. According to the Census Report the area of this parish is 1,460 acres (5.9 km^{2}).

Stoke Mandeville Hospital, although named after the village, is located in Aylesbury. The hospital has the largest spinal injuries ward in Europe, and is best known internationally as the birthplace of the Paralympic movement; the Stoke Mandeville Games, instituted at the hospital by Sir Ludwig Guttmann in 1948 evolved to become the first Paralympic Games in Rome in 1960, which were also the 9th Stoke Mandeville Games. Stoke Mandeville hospital and stadium were also joint host of the 1984 Summer Paralympics with New York, with the wheelchair elements of the Games being held at the hospital and stadium.

Stoke Mandeville Stadium, although in Aylesbury, gave its name to the Paralympic Games mascot, Mandeville, in 2012.

== History ==
The village was originally recorded as Stoches in the Domesday Book of 1086, from the Old English word stoc meaning an outlying farm or hamlet. The suffix Mandeville was first recorded in 1284 when the manor was listed as being in the hands of the powerful Norman de Mandeville family.

The former medieval parish church, St Mary the Virgin, unusually stood alone on a damp site 1 km from the old village for no apparent reason. Therefore, it had been postulated that a Roman mausoleum was present on the site before the church was built. The church was condemned in the mid-20th century and was demolished in January 1966 by the Royal Engineers. In 2018 in preparation for the construction of the HS2 high-speed railway, archaeological excavations began on the site of the old church. As well as excavating the church, the process involved moving the remains of those buried in the churchyard, which dates back to 1080. In September 2021, archaeologists from LP-Archaeology, led by Rachel Wood, announced the discovery of remains on the site of the church. They unearthed a possible square foundation trench enclosed by a circular ditch containing burials and two Roman statues. In January 2022 the archaeological excavation of the site, and the discovery of significant Roman statuary and burial urns, was featured in the BBC's Digging for Britain.

The newer red brick parish church of St Mary, consecrated in July 1866 by the Bishop of Oxford, Samuel Wilberforce, remains the only church in the village apart from the Methodist church in Eskdale Road.

On 13 May 2000, the new Stoke Mandeville Millennium village sign was unveiled. It stands on a small brick plinth on the green outside the primary school. The sign shows colourful images on both sides of aspects of village life over the centuries.

== Transport ==
Stoke Mandeville railway station is on the London to Aylesbury Line between Aylesbury station and Wendover station, served by Chiltern Railways, which terminates at Aylesbury Vale Parkway northbound and London Marylebone southbound. Arriva Shires & Essex number 50 bus also serves the area on Station Road, as do services 130 and X9/X90 – which stop in the centre of the village. High Speed 2 passes to the southwest of the village, but doesn't stop.

== Education ==
Stoke Mandeville Combined School is a mixed community school which takes children from the age of four through to the age of eleven. (Year R – 6) The school has approximately 220 pupils. It also has a hearing impaired department, which currently helps up to 15 children through their school day.

== Gallery ==
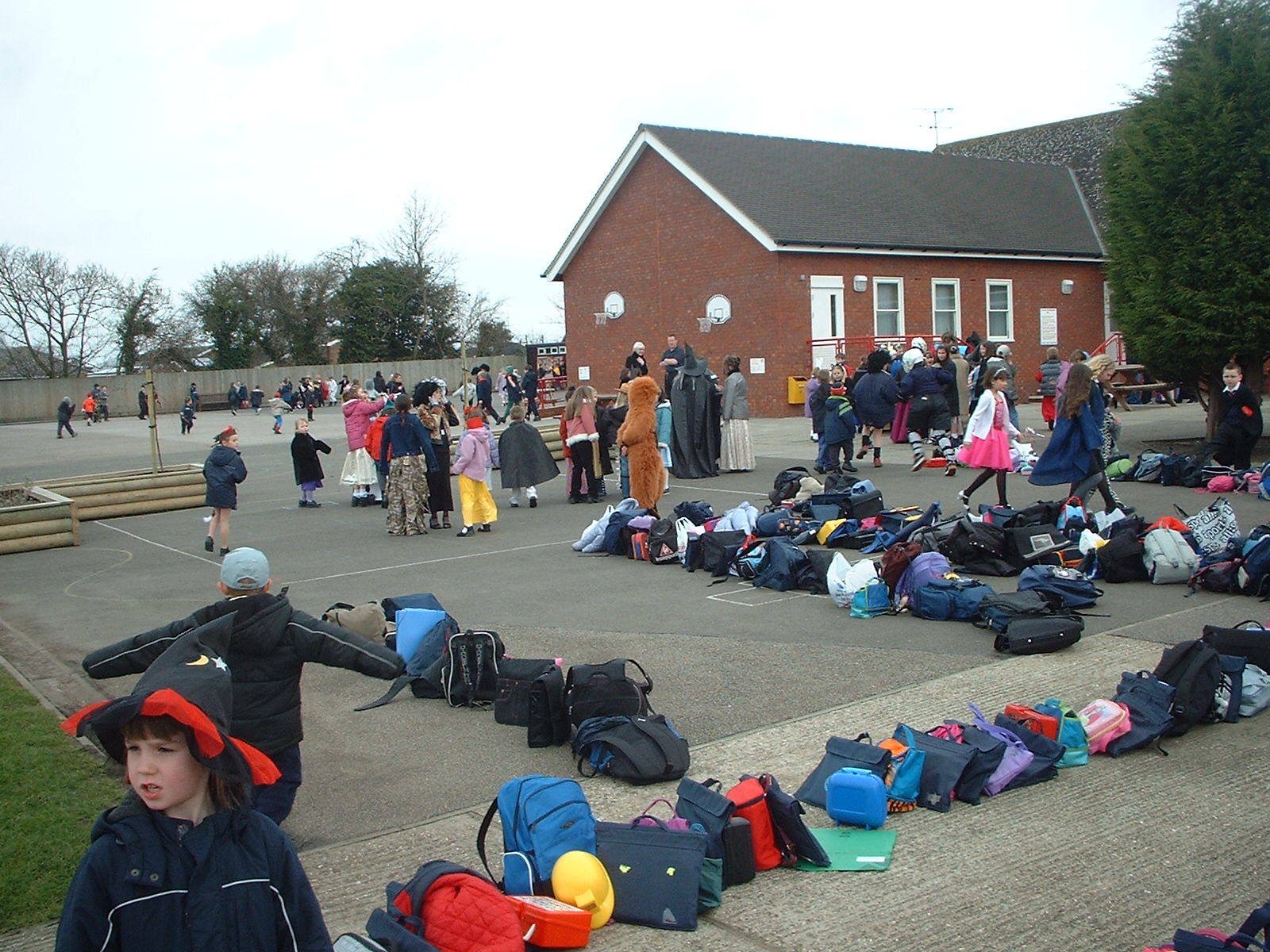
The back of Stoke Mandeville Combined School

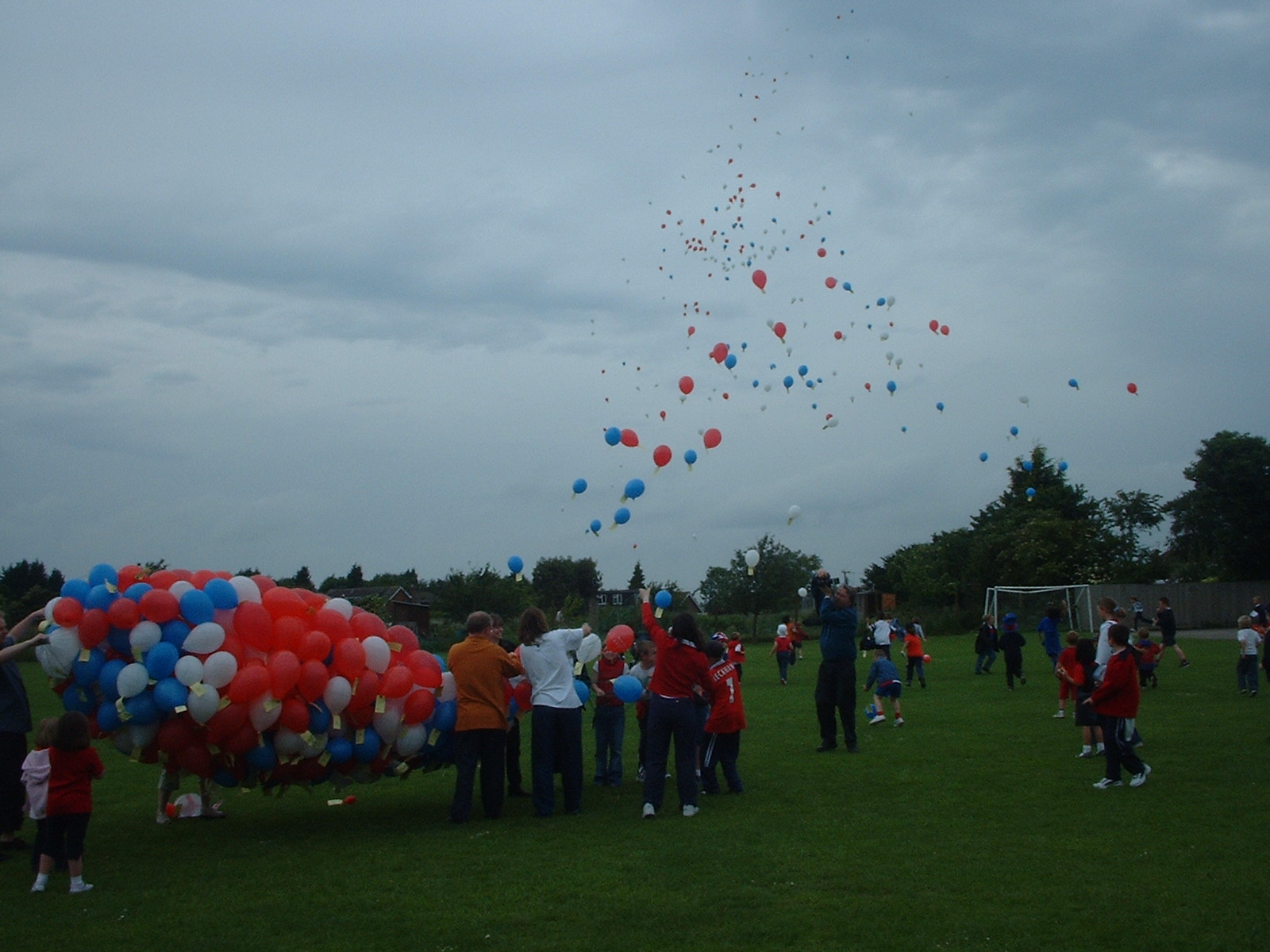
Stoke Mandeville Combined School Balloon Release Event
