= 1984 Summer Paralympics =

Multi-parasport event in the US and UK

VII Paralympic Games
- Location: Nassau County, New York, United States; Stoke Mandeville, United Kingdom
- Nations: 45 (USA); 41 (GBR)
- Athletes: 1,800 (USA); 1,100 (GBR)
- Events: 375 in 15 sports (USA); 603 in 10 sports (GBR)
- Opening: 17 June 1984 (USA); 22 July 1984 (GBR)
- Closing: 30 June 1984 (USA); 1 August 1984 (GBR)
- Opened by: President Ronald Reagan (USA); Charles, Prince of Wales (GBR)
- Stadium: Mitchel Athletic Complex (USA); Stoke Mandeville Stadium (GBR)

The 1984 International Games for the Disabled, commonly known as the 1984 Summer Paralympics, were the seventh Paralympic Games to be held. There were two separate competitions: one in Stoke Mandeville, England, United Kingdom for wheelchair athletes with spinal cord injuries and the other at the Mitchel Athletic Complex and Hofstra University on Long Island, New York, United States for wheelchair and ambulatory athletes with cerebral palsy, amputees, and les autres [the others] (conditions as well as blind and visually impaired athletes). Stoke Mandeville had been the location of the Stoke Mandeville Games from 1948 onwards, seen as the precursors to the Paralympic Games, as the 9th International Stoke Mandeville Games in Rome in 1960 are now recognised as the first Summer Paralympics.

As with the 1984 Summer Olympics held in Los Angeles, the Soviet Union and other communist countries, except China, East Germany, Hungary, Poland and Yugoslavia, did not participate in the Paralympic Games. The Soviet Union did not participate in the Paralympics at the time, arguing that "there are no invalids" in the USSR. A delegation of 18 blind Soviet athletes registered for the International Games for the Disabled, but withdrew its participation weeks before the opening ceremony, citing concerns for the safety of Soviet athletes. The USSR made its Paralympic debut in 1988, the same site for the 1988 Seoul Olympics.

The 1984 Paralympic Games were the last Summer Games not to be staged by the same host city as the Olympic Games. Seoul hosted both events in 1988, a pattern maintained thereafter.

== Organization ==
=== World Wheelchair Games ===
Since the 1960 inception of the international event that retroactively became known as the Paralympic Games, the organizers had held the event in the same country as the Summer Olympics every four years, except when they were prevented from doing so by the national government (Mexico in 1968 and the Soviet Union in 1980). With the selection of the United States as the host of the 1984 Summer Olympics, it was expected that the U.S. would also host the Paralympics, but the two events were not officially connected at the time.

The National Wheelchair Athletic Association (NWAA) was responsible for finding an institution in the United States that would host and financially sponsor the Paralympic Games. By June 1981, the choice of a host institution had been narrowed to three finalists: the Daniel Freeman Memorial Hospital in Inglewood, California, the University of Illinois Urbana-Champaign, and the University of Washington in Seattle. Another proposal was made by the University of Texas at Arlington, but this was dropped due to a lack of clarity about the source of funding for the Games. In December, the University of Illinois was chosen as the host for the event.

Organizers approached the U.S. Olympic Committee (USOC) to seek its support for the event. Instead, the USOC demanded that the NWAA stop using the term "Paralympics". The Amateur Sports Act of 1978 had given the USOC exclusive control over the use of the term "Olympics" in sporting competitions in the United States, and the USOC had previously sued events like the Gay Olympics in San Francisco to stop them from using the name. The name of the Illinois event was changed to the World Wheelchair Games. The change of name contributed to the NWAA's difficulties in raising funds for the event, as the name "Paralympics" was familiar to many but "World Wheelchair Games" was not.

The University of Illinois, not wanting to take on debt to host the Games, gave the NWAA a deadline of January 31, 1984, to raise $2 million or the event would be cancelled. Despite several nationwide fundraising efforts, including a General Mills sponsorship which encouraged donations on the back of every box of Wheaties, the fundraising goal was not met. The following month, the university terminated its contract with the World Wheelchair Games, leaving the event without a host. The organizers contacted the IOC and the Los Angeles Olympic Organizing Committee for emergency support, but without success.

On March 4, 1984, the Executive Committee of the International Stoke Mandeville Games Federation (ISMGF), which had organized the Paralympics before 1976, announced that it would host a replacement event if the problems in Illinois could not be resolved. At the time, the ISMGF held an edition of the International Stoke Mandeville Games every summer except in Paralympic years, so this meant hosting an extra event in 1984.

=== International Games for the Disabled ===
Beginning in 1976, the International Games for the Disabled, consisting of events for disabled athletes other than those with paraplegia, were organized by the International Sports Organization for the Disabled (ISOD). The event had been held in tandem with the Paralympic Games in Canada in 1976 and in the Netherlands in 1980, but the NWAA decided in October 1980 that its plans in Illinois would not include non-wheelchair athletes. Therefore, the ISOD was responsible for organizing its own event, and also sought to do so in the United States.

The 1984 International Games for the Disabled were sponsored by the U.S. Association for Blind Athletes, the U.S. Amputee Athletic Association, and the National Association of Sports for Cerebral Palsy. Nassau County, New York, was chosen as the host area of the Games in October 1982.

== Ceremonies ==
In the opening ceremonies, patchy showers greeted the 14,000 spectators packed into the Mitchel Park stadium for the 2pm start of the New York Games opening ceremony on 19 June. New York radio personality William B. Williams introduced everyone with a welcome speech. Entertainers such as Bill Buzzeo and the Dixie Ramblers, Richie Havens, The New Image Drum and Bugle Corps, the ARC Gospel Chorus and the Square Dance Extravaganza followed the introduction speech. At the closing ceremonies, Commander Archie Cameron, President of ICC officially closed the games with a short speech acknowledging the athletes and the next host city, Seoul, South Korea and was to be held in conjunction with the 1988 Summer Olympics. The flag of the Games was lowered and American athletes carried the flag back to the honor stand where they handed over to the President of the Organizing Committee, Dr William T. Callahan and Cameron.

== Mascot ==
Dan D. Lion

Mascot of the 1984 Summer Paralympics (New York)
- Creator: Maryanne McGrath Higgins
- Significance: A lion

The mascot for the 1984 Paralympic Games was Dan D. Lion, which was designed by an art teacher, Maryanne McGrath Higgins. The name was voted on by students of the Human Resources School (now Henry Viscardi School), a school in Albertson, New York for students with severe physical impairments. Another mascot named Dan D. Lion, with a different design, was the mascot for the British team in the Stoke Mandeville portion of the Games.

== Sports ==
Competitors were divided into five disability-specific categories: amputee, cerebral palsy, visually impaired, wheelchair, and les autres (athletes with physical disabilities that had not been eligible to compete in previous Games). The wheelchair category was for those competitors who used a wheelchair due to a spinal cord disability. However some athletes in the amputee and cerebral palsy categories also competed in wheelchairs. Within the sport of athletics, a wheelchair marathon event was held for the first time. The trials for the two wheelchair events to be held at the 1984 Los Angeles Olympic Games was held in conjunction with the New York Games. However, despite the long and established history of using "paralympic" terminology, in the United States the US Olympic Committee prohibited the Games organizers from using the term. The seventeen contested sports are listed below, along with the disability categories which competed in each.

- Archery – Cerebral palsy, wheelchair, and les autres
- Athletics – All
- Boccia – Cerebral palsy
- Cycling – Cerebral palsy
- Equestrian – Cerebral palsy
- Football 7-a-side – Cerebral palsy
- Goalball – Visually impaired
- Lawn bowls – Amputee and wheelchair
- Lifting – Amputee, cerebral palsy, wheelchair, and les autres
  - Powerlifting
  - Weightlifting
- Shooting – Amputee, cerebral palsy, wheelchair, and les autres
- Snooker – Wheelchair
- Swimming – All
- Table tennis – Amputee, cerebral palsy, wheelchair, and les autres
- Volleyball – Amputee and les autres
- Wheelchair basketball – Wheelchair and les autres
- Wheelchair fencing – Wheelchair
- Wrestling – Visually impaired

== Medal table ==
The host nations, Great Britain and the United States, are highlighted. Bahrain, China, Jordan, Trinidad and Tobago won their first ever medals, with Luxembourg winning a first ever gold.

Rank	Nation	Gold	Silver	Bronze	Total
1	United States*	137	131	129	397
2	Great Britain*	107	112	112	331
3	Canada	87	82	69	238
4	Sweden	83	43	34	160
5	West Germany	81	76	75	232
6	France	71	69	46	186
7	Netherlands	55	52	28	135
8	Australia	49	54	51	154
9	Poland	46	39	21	106
10	Norway	30	30	30	90
11	Denmark	30	13	16	59
12	Spain	22	10	12	44
13	Belgium	21	23	14	58
14	Ireland	20	15	31	66
15	Finland	18	14	27	59
16	Switzerland	18	13	12	43
17	Austria	14	20	10	44
18	Hungary	12	13	3	28
19	Israel	11	21	12	44
20	Yugoslavia	11	10	11	32
21	Italy	9	19	14	42
22	Japan	9	7	8	24
23	New Zealand	8	10	7	25
24	Brazil	7	17	4	28
25	Mexico	6	14	17	37
26	Portugal	4	3	7	14
27	Hong Kong	3	5	9	17
28	China	2	12	8	22
29	Trinidad and Tobago	2	0	1	3
30	Luxembourg	1	4	1	6
31	Kuwait	1	3	4	8
32	Burma	1	2	1	4
33	Egypt	1	1	5	7
34	Kenya	1	1	1	3
35	East Germany	0	3	1	4
36	Iceland	0	2	8	10
37	India	0	2	2	4
37	South Korea	0	2	2	4
39	Jordan	0	1	2	3
39	Zimbabwe	0	1	2	3
41	Bahamas	0	1	1	2
41	Indonesia	0	1	1	2
43	Bahrain	0	0	2	2
Totals (43 entries)		978	951	851	2,780

== Participating delegations ==
Fifty-four delegations took part in the 1984 Paralympics. Bahrain, China, East Germany, Faroe Islands, Jordan, Liechtenstein, Papua New Guinea, Thailand, Trinidad and Tobago and Venezuela made their first appearances, India and Portugal returned to the Games after a 12-year absence.

- Argentina (6)
- Australia (108)
- Austria (45)
- Bahamas (2)
- Bahrain (12)
- Belgium (35)
- Brazil (30)
- Burma (10)
- Canada (166)
- China (23)
- Denmark (36)
- East Germany (4)
- Ecuador (2)
- Egypt (28)
- Faroe Islands (3)
- Finland (57)
- France (115)
- Great Britain (224)
- Greece (3)
- Guatemala (4)
- Hong Kong (25)
- Hungary (26)
- Iceland (13)
- India (5)
- Indonesia (8)
- Ireland (51)
- Israel (47)
- Italy (60)
- Jamaica (1)
- Japan (37)
- Jordan (9)
- Kenya (13)
- Kuwait (22)
- Liechtenstein (1)
- Luxembourg (5)
- Malta (1)
- Mexico (54)
- Netherlands (61)
- New Zealand (13)
- Norway (64)
- Papua New Guinea (4)
- Poland (34)
- Portugal (17)
- South Korea (18)
- Spain (29)
- Sweden (97)
- Switzerland (43)
- Thailand (4)
- Trinidad and Tobago (8)
- United States (236)
- Venezuela (6)
- West Germany (142)
- Yugoslavia (30)
- Zimbabwe (8)

== Reception at the host cities ==
Odeda Rosenthal, a professor of humanities at a local community college on Long Island and translator for the Austrian team highlighted a number of problems at the games in a series of articles. She highlighted a number of issues such as poor communication, administrative hiccups and even bus drivers not knowing the routes to scheduled events that even caused some teams to miss events completely. Rosenthal continues by slamming the work by the Police Chief claiming the Chief "took the opposite tack of anything that was suggested to sort out the mess". However, overall reports and the general impression exuded by the games included a friendly atmosphere and volunteers trying their hardest under difficult conditions.

== See also ==
- 1984 Summer Olympics
- 1984 Winter Olympics
- 1984 Winter Paralympics

Preceded by Arnhem	Summer Paralympics; New York–Stoke Mandeville; VII Paralympic Summer Games (1984)	Succeeded by Seoul
