= Athletics at the 1984 Summer Paralympics =

Athletics at the VII Paralympic Games
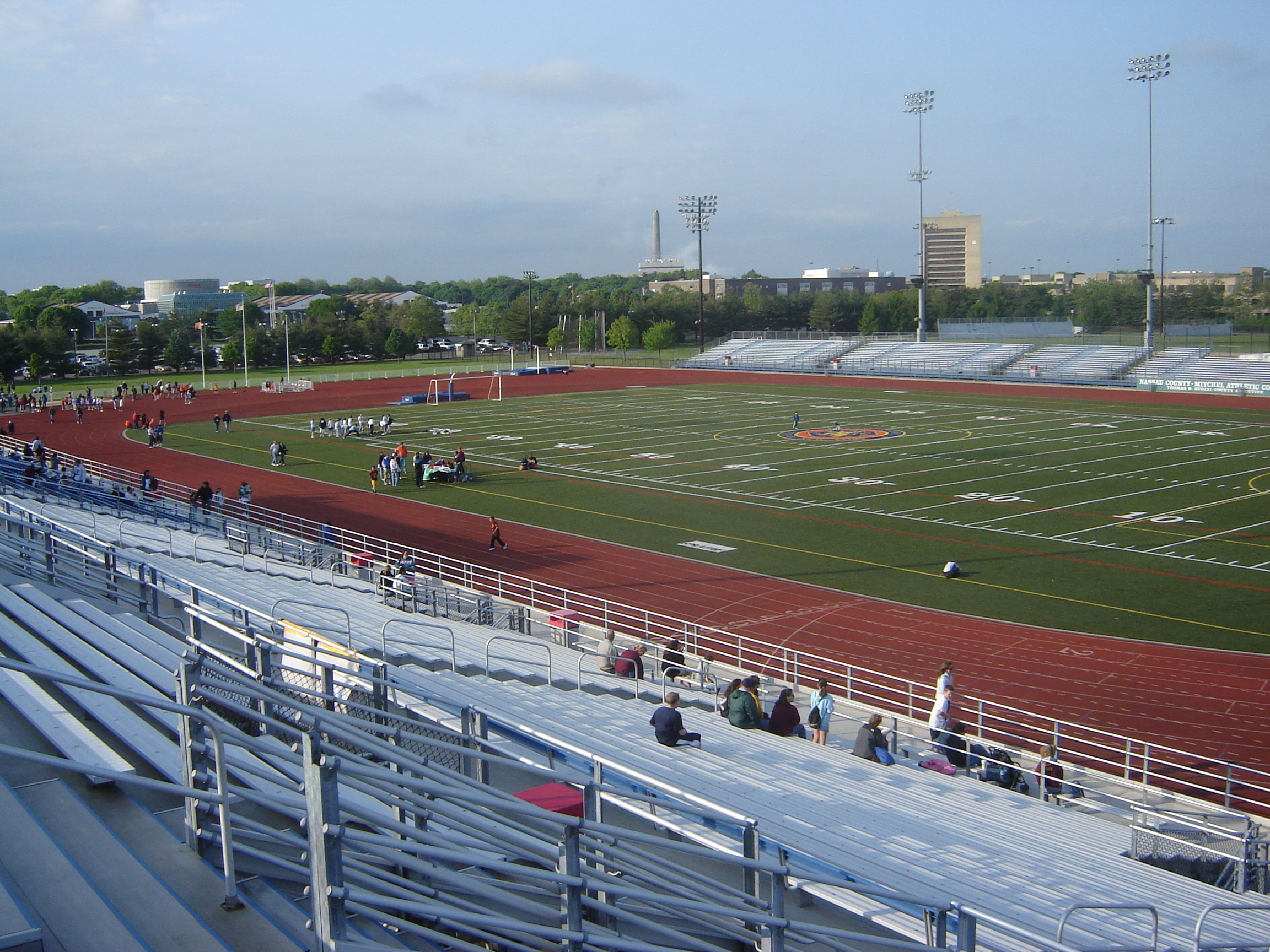
- Host stadium (shown in 2007)
- Competitors: 1198 from 51 nations

Athletics at the 1984 Summer Paralympics consisted of 447 events.

== Participating nations ==
- Argentina (6)
- Australia (54)
- Austria (30)
- Bahamas (2)
- Bahrain (12)
- Belgium (18)
- Brazil (25)
- Burma (10)
- Canada (114)
- China (12)
- Denmark (11)
- East Germany (4)
- Ecuador (2)
- Egypt (18)
- Finland (34)
- France (27)
- Great Britain (130)
- Greece (3)
- Hong Kong (17)
- Hungary (12)
- Iceland (5)
- India (4)
- Indonesia (8)
- Ireland (43)
- Israel (10)
- Italy (34)
- Jamaica (1)
- Japan (28)
- Jordan (7)
- Kenya (13)
- Kuwait (17)
- Liechtenstein (1)
- Luxembourg (3)
- Mexico (47)
- Netherlands (16)
- New Zealand (10)
- Norway (31)
- Papua New Guinea (4)
- Poland (20)
- Portugal (15)
- South Korea (5)
- Spain (7)
- Sweden (25)
- Switzerland (26)
- Thailand (1)
- Trinidad and Tobago (7)
- United States (167)
- Venezuela (5)
- West Germany (74)
- Yugoslavia (16)
- Zimbabwe (7)

== Medal summary ==
=== Medal table ===
1984 Summer Paralympics Athletics medal table
| Rank | NPC | Gold | Silver | Bronze | Total |
|---|---|---|---|---|---|
| 1 | United States (USA) | 83 | 80 | 72 | 235 |
| 2 | Great Britain (GBR) | 57 | 43 | 41 | 141 |
| 3 | Canada (CAN) | 48 | 30 | 28 | 106 |
| 4 | West Germany (FRG) | 34 | 34 | 38 | 106 |
| 5 | Sweden (SWE) | 31 | 11 | 7 | 49 |
| 6 | Poland (POL) | 17 | 22 | 13 | 52 |
| 7 | Australia (AUS) | 16 | 18 | 21 | 55 |
| 8 | Belgium (BEL) | 16 | 14 | 7 | 37 |
| 9 | Switzerland (SUI) | 15 | 10 | 7 | 32 |
| 10 | Ireland (IRL) | 13 | 11 | 24 | 48 |
| 11 | Denmark (DEN) | 12 | 5 | 2 | 19 |
| 12 | Norway (NOR) | 11 | 14 | 11 | 36 |
| 13 | Finland (FIN) | 11 | 8 | 16 | 35 |
| 14 | France (FRA) | 9 | 22 | 14 | 45 |
| 15 | Japan (JPN) | 9 | 6 | 4 | 19 |
| 16 | New Zealand (NZL) | 7 | 8 | 4 | 19 |
| 17 | Yugoslavia (YUG) | 7 | 8 | 3 | 18 |
| 18 | Mexico (MEX) | 6 | 12 | 15 | 33 |
| 19 | Brazil (BRA) | 6 | 12 | 3 | 21 |
| 20 | Netherlands (NED) | 6 | 10 | 8 | 24 |
| 21 | Austria (AUT) | 5 | 11 | 7 | 23 |
| 22 | Italy (ITA) | 4 | 6 | 2 | 12 |
| 23 | Israel (ISR) | 3 | 5 | 3 | 11 |
| 24 | Portugal (POR) | 3 | 2 | 5 | 10 |
| 25 | Spain (ESP) | 3 | 1 | 3 | 7 |
| 26 | Hungary (HUN) | 2 | 7 | 2 | 11 |
| 27 | China (CHN) | 2 | 5 | 4 | 11 |
| 28 | Hong Kong (HKG) | 2 | 2 | 5 | 9 |
| 29 | Trinidad and Tobago (TRI) | 2 | 0 | 0 | 2 |
| 30 | Burma (BIR) | 1 | 2 | 1 | 4 |
| 30 | Kuwait (KUW) | 1 | 2 | 1 | 4 |
| 32 | Kenya (KEN) | 1 | 1 | 1 | 3 |
| 33 | East Germany (GDR) | 0 | 3 | 0 | 3 |
| 34 | India (IND) | 0 | 2 | 2 | 4 |
| 35 | Luxembourg (LUX) | 0 | 2 | 0 | 2 |
| 36 | Jordan (JOR) | 0 | 1 | 2 | 3 |
| 37 | Bahamas (BAH) | 0 | 1 | 1 | 2 |
| 38 | Egypt (EGY) | 0 | 0 | 4 | 4 |
| 39 | Bahrain (BRN) | 0 | 0 | 2 | 2 |
| 39 | Iceland (ISL) | 0 | 0 | 2 | 2 |
| 39 | Zimbabwe (ZIM) | 0 | 0 | 2 | 2 |
| Totals (41 entries) | | 443 | 431 | 387 | 1,261 |

=== Men's events ===
| Event | Gold | Silver | Bronze |
|---|---|---|---|
| 20 m (arm) C2 | Brian Kelly; Canada | Ignacio Juárez Domínguez; Mexico | Mike Bowen; United States |
| 60 m C2 | Mogens Justesen; Denmark | Tom Cush; United States | Edwin Moore; Great Britain |
| 60 m C3 | Per Boman; Sweden | Erich Christ; West Germany | Rene Rivera; United States |
| 60 m C6 | Colin Keay; Great Britain | Andre Havard; France | Gordon Robertson; Great Britain |
| 60 m L1 | John Welsh; Great Britain | Doug Harris; United States | Tony Worley; United States |
| 100 m 1A | J. Lewellyn; United States | Rainer Küschall; Switzerland | H. Lobbering; West Germany |
| 100 m 1B | Leif Hedman; Sweden | Peter Schmid; Switzerland | Terry Gehlert; Canada |
| 100 m 1C | Eduardo Monsalvo; Mexico | Dino Wallen; United States | J. Hayes; United States |
| 100 m 2 | Eusebio Valdez; Mexico | David McPherson; Australia | Jorge Luna; Mexico |
| 100 m 3 | Marc de Vos; Belgium | Paul van Winkel; Belgium | Jorge Graciano; Brazil |
| 100 m 4 | Robert Courtney; New Zealand | Hans Schroder; West Germany | Ron Minor; Canada |
| 100 m 5 | D. Barret; United States | Franz Nietlispach; Switzerland | Adel Sultan; Bahrain |
| 100 m A1–3 | Jim Martinson; United States | Kris Lenzo; United States | Gerry O'Rourke; Ireland |
| 100 m A4 | Kazimierz Suchocki; Poland | Jurgen Johann; West Germany | Joe Egan; Australia |
| 100 m A5 | Mathias Berghoter; West Germany | Jerzy Szlezak; Poland | Felix Abele; West Germany |
| 100 m A6 | Harri Jauhiainen; Finland | Ira Rankin; United States | Peter Kirby; Australia |
| 100 m B1 | Winford Haynes; United States | Yvan Bourdeau; Canada | Soedjeman Dipowidjojo; Netherlands |
| 100 m B1 | Winford Haynes; United States | Yvan Bourdeau; Canada | Stefan Bidzinski; Poland |
| 100 m B2 | Mark Davies; Australia | Kurt Prall; Austria | Walter Knors; West Germany |
| 100 m B3 | Paul Smith; United States | Lucien Quemond; France | Yoshinori Simazu; Japan |
| 100 m C4 | Robert Easton; Canada | Jean Louis Janneay; France | Waymon Ware; United States |
| 100 m C5 | John Sacco; United States | Dean Houle; United States | Mark Kemp; United States |
| 100 m C7 | Henrik Thomsen; Denmark | Michel Bapte; France | Mario Debaene; Belgium |
| 100 m C8 | Reinaldo Jose Pereira; Portugal | Antonio Carlos Martins; Portugal | Franz Hlozek; Austria |
| 100 m L2 | Scott Schneider; United States | Patrick de Uylder; Belgium | Gary Stone; United States |
| 100 m L3 | Hikan Eriksson; Sweden | Bill Lehr; United States | Keith Whiley; Great Britain |
| 100 m L5 | Derek Nixon; Great Britain | Mathias Bingen; Luxembourg | |
| 100 m L6 | Reino Peltonen; Finland | Peter Williams; Great Britain | Robert Love; Great Britain |
| 200 m 1A | Rainer Küschall; Switzerland | Bart Dodson; United States | H. Lobbering; West Germany |
| 200 m 1B | J. Matsson; Sweden | Peter Schmid; Switzerland | Leif Hedman; Sweden |
| 200 m 1C | Dino Wallen; United States | Alan Dufty; Australia | J. Hayes; United States |
| 200 m 2 | Jorge Luna; Mexico | Paul Clark; Canada | David McPherson; Australia |
| 200 m 3 | Marc de Vos; Belgium | Paul van Winkel; Belgium | H. Jansson; Sweden |
| 200 m 4 | Ron Minor; Canada | Remi van Ophem; Belgium | Hans Schroder; West Germany |
| 200 m 5 | Franz Nietlispach; Switzerland | D. Barret; United States | Tom Foran; United States |
| 200 m C2 | Mogens Justesen; Denmark | Tom Cush; United States | Edwin Moore; Great Britain |
| 200 m C3 | Erich Christ; West Germany | Per Boman; Sweden | Richard Simon; United States |
| 200 m C7 | Henrik Thomsen; Denmark | Michel Bapte; France | Haukur Gunnarsson; Iceland |
| 200 m C8 | Antonio Carlos Martins; Portugal | Franz Hlozek; Austria | Reinaldo Jose Perier; Portugal |
| 400 m 1A | Rainer Küschall; Switzerland | J. Lewellyn; United States | Heinrich Koeberle; West Germany |
| 400 m 1B | J. Matsson; Sweden | N. Jorgensen; United States | Peter Schmid; Switzerland |
| 400 m 1C | Alan Dufty; Australia | D. Goodman; United States | Eduardo Monsalvo; Mexico |
| 400 m 2 | Mike Nugent; Australia | Paul Clark; Canada | Heinz Frei; Switzerland |
| 400 m 3 | Paul van Winkel; Belgium | Marc de Vos; Belgium | Gregor Golombek; West Germany |
| 400 m 4 | Ron Minor; Canada | Randy Snow; United States | Remi van Ophem; Belgium |
| 400 m 5 | Franz Nietlispach; Switzerland | D. Barret; United States | Tom Foran; United States |
| 400 m A1–3 | Kris Lenzo; United States | Gerry O'Rourke; Ireland | Jim Martinson; United States |
| 400 m A4 | Kazimierz Suchocki; Poland | Stephen Sargolia; Australia | Jurgen Johann; West Germany |
| 400 m A5 | Jerzy Szlezak; Poland | Matthias Berg; West Germany | Slobodan Adzic; Yugoslavia |
| 400 m A6 | Harri Jauhiainen; Finland | John Watson; Great Britain | Peter Kirby; Australia |
| 400 m B1 | Winford Haynes; United States | Lonzey Jenkins; United States | Graham Salmon; Great Britain |
| 400 m B2 | Walter Knors; West Germany | Mats Lindblad; Sweden | |
| 400 m B2 | Walter Knors; West Germany | Ramon Odzakovic; Yugoslavia | |
| 400 m B3 | Lucien Quemond; France | Noel Thatcher; Great Britain | Paul Smith; United States |
| 400 m C4 | Robert Easton; Canada | Jean Louis Janneay; France | Antoine Delaune; France |
| 400 m C6 | Colin Keay; Great Britain | Gordon Robertson; Great Britain | Andre Havard; France |
| 400 m C7 | Rudi Kocmut; Yugoslavia | Robert Mearns; Canada | Haukur Gunnarsson; Iceland |
| 400 m L2 | Patrick de Uylder; Belgium | Scott Schneider; United States | Gary Stone; United States |
| 400 m L3 | Hikan Eriksson; Sweden | Bill Lehr; United States | John Grant; Great Britain |
| 400 m L4 | John Fisher; Great Britain | | |
| 400 m L6 | Jouko Grip; Finland | Reino Peltonen; Finland | Peter Williams; Great Britain |
| 800 m 1A | Heinrich Koeberle; West Germany | J. Lewellyn; United States | Rainer Küschall; Switzerland |
| 800 m 1B | J. Matsson; Sweden | Peter Schmid; Switzerland | N. Jorgensen; United States |
| 800 m 1C | D. Goodman; United States | Eduardo Monsalvo; Mexico | Alan Dufty; Australia |
| 800 m 2 | Paul Clark; Canada | Heinz Frei; Switzerland | Mike Nugent; Australia |
| 800 m 3 | Marc de Vos; Belgium | Gregor Golombek; West Germany | J. Rodolf; United States |
| 800 m 4 | Ron Minor; Canada | Randy Snow; United States | Peter Trotter; Australia |
| 800 m 5 | Franz Nietlispach; Switzerland | Robert McIntyre; Australia | Mel Fitzgerald; Canada |
| 800 m A1–3 | Mustapha Badid; France | Jim Martinson; United States | Gerry O'Rourke; Ireland |
| 800 m B1 | Robert Matthews; Great Britain | Tofiri Kibuuka; Norway | Patrick Kelly; Ireland |
| 800 m B2 | Freddy Matton; Belgium | Ramon Odzakovic; Yugoslavia | Sixten Berner; Sweden |
| 800 m B3 | James Brown; Great Britain | Leamon Stansell; United States | Fintan O'Donnell; Ireland |
| 800 m C4 | Robert Easton; Canada | Jean Louis Janneay; France | Gino Vendetti; Canada |
| 800 m C8 | Robert Mearns; Canada | Ari Lehto; Finland | Antonio Carlos Martins; Portugal |
| 800 m L3 | Hikan Eriksson; Sweden | Bill Lehr; United States | John Grant; Great Britain |
| 1000 m cross country C6 | Colin Keay; Great Britain | Tony Harborn; Sweden | Salvin Ficara; United States |
| 1500 m cross country C7 | Robert Mearns; Canada | Gary Gardner; Great Britain | John Jansen; Netherlands |
| 1500 m cross country C8 | Antonio Carlos Martins; Portugal | Ari Lehto; Finland | Paul Taylor; Great Britain |
| 1500 m 2 | Heinz Frei; Switzerland | Paul Clark; Canada | Mike Nugent; Australia |
| 1500 m 3 | Paul van Winkel; Belgium | Gregor Golombek; West Germany | André Viger; Canada |
| 1500 m 4 | Rick Hansen; Canada | Peter Trotter; Australia | Randy Snow; United States |
| 1500 m 5 | Franz Nietlispach; Switzerland | Mel Fitzgerald; Canada | Robert McIntyre; Australia |
| 1500 m A5 | Cato Zahl Pedersen; Norway | Slobodan Adzic; Yugoslavia | Axel Hecker; West Germany |
| 1500 m A6 | Harri Jauhiainen; Finland | Michael Ocallaghan; New Zealand | Giuseppe Pavan; Italy |
| 1500 m B1 | Robert Matthews; Great Britain | Tofiri Kibuuka; Norway | Patrick Kelly; Ireland |
| 1500 m B2 | Sixten Berner; Sweden | Sverre Fuglerud; Norway | Gunnar Thomsson; Sweden |
| 1500 m B3 | James Brown; Great Britain | Patrick de Ryck; Belgium | Leamon Stansell; United States |
| 1500 m L6 | Jouko Grip; Finland | Peter Williams; Great Britain | Robert Love; Great Britain |
| 5000 m 2 | Heinz Frei; Switzerland | Paul Clark; Canada | Erwin Zemp; Switzerland |
| 5000 m 3 | Gregor Golombek; West Germany | George Murray; United States | J. Rodolf; United States |
| 5000 m 4 | Peter Trotter; Australia | Rick Hansen; Canada | Jean Francois Poitevin; France |
| 5000 m 5 | Tom Foran; United States | Mel Fitzgerald; Canada | Robert McIntyre; Australia |
| 5000 m A5 | Cato Zahl Pedersen; Norway | Slobodan Adzic; Yugoslavia | Yekutiel Gershoni; Israel |
| 5000 m A6 | Giuseppe Pavan; Italy | Michael Ocallaghan; New Zealand | Heikki Miettinen; Finland |
| 5000 m B1 | Robert Matthews; Great Britain | Tofiri Kibuuka; Norway | Joerund Gaasemyr; Norway |
| 5000 m B2 | Gunnar Thomsson; Sweden | Freddy Matton; Belgium | Terje Loevaas; Norway |
| 5000 m B3 | Leamon Stansell; United States | Neil Pearson; Great Britain | Giulio Gusmeroli; Italy |
| Marathon 1A | Heinrich Koeberle; West Germany | | |
| Marathon 1B | J. Matsson; Sweden | Peter Schmid; Switzerland | Ronan Rooney; Ireland |
| Marathon 1C | Alan Dufty; Australia | Dino Wallen; United States | Eduardo Monsalvo; Mexico |
| Marathon 2 | Heinz Frei; Switzerland | Paul Clark; Canada | Graham Condon; New Zealand |
| Marathon 3 | André Viger; Canada | Gregor Golombek; West Germany | R. Sampson; Canada |
| Marathon 4 | Rick Hansen; Canada | Jean Francois Poitevin; France | Ron Minor; Canada |
| Marathon 5 | Mel Fitzgerald; Canada | B. Hedrick; United States | Tom Foran; United States |
| 4 × 100 m relay 1A–1C | United States (USA) | Switzerland (SUI); Werner Kaiser; Rainer Küschall; Peter Schmid; Eric Walter | Australia (AUS) |
| 4 × 100 m relay 2–5 | Belgium (BEL) | United States (USA) | Sweden (SWE) |
| 4 × 100 m relay A4–9 | Australia (AUS) | Poland (POL) | United States (USA) |
| 4 × 100 m relay C4 | Canada (CAN) | Great Britain (GBR); Norman Burns; Michael Hipkin; Anthony Honour; Paul Williams | |
| 4 × 100 m relay C7–8 | Great Britain (GBR); Gary Gardner; Darren Rabin; Gerard McConnell; Paul Taylor | Portugal (POR) | Ireland (IRL) |
| 4 × 200 m relay 1A–1C | Canada (CAN) | Australia (AUS) | |
| 4 × 200 m relay 2–5 | Belgium (BEL) | Canada (CAN) | West Germany (FRG) |
| 4 × 400 m relay 2–5 | Belgium (BEL) | Canada (CAN) | Australia (AUS) |
| 4 × 400 m relay A4–9 | Poland (POL) | Australia (AUS) | Austria (AUT) |
| High jump A2 | Arnold Boldt; Canada | Bert Bottemanne; Netherlands | |
| High jump A2 | Arnold Boldt; Canada | Anthony Willis; Great Britain | |
| High jump A3 | Ngwe Tin; Burma | Ronan Tynan; Ireland | |
| High jump A3 | Ngwe Tin; Burma | Gyi Aung; Burma | |
| High jump A4 | Ronnie Alsup; United States | James Hoggan; Australia | |
| High jump A4 | Ronnie Alsup; United States | Kazimierz Suchocki; Poland | |
| High jump A5 | Matthias Berg; West Germany | Jeff Tiessen; Canada | |
| High jump A5 | Matthias Berg; West Germany | Jerzy Szlezak; Poland | |
| High jump A5 | Matthias Berg; West Germany | Ronald West; Great Britain | |
| High jump A6 | Michael Morley; Australia | Brett Holcombe; Australia | |
| High jump A6 | Michael Morley; Australia | Peter Lorencz; Hungary | |
| High jump B1 | Italo Sacchetto; Italy | Stefan Bidzinski; Poland | Beat Camenzind; Switzerland |
| High jump B2 | Stephane Saas; France | Rudy de Meersman; Belgium | Norbert Antlitz; West Germany |
| High jump B3 | Yosef Olah; Hungary | Claudio Foresti; Italy | George Morris; United States |
| High jump B3 | Yosef Olah; Hungary | Claudio Foresti; Italy | Warren Lawton; Australia |
| Long jump A2 | Kerrod McGregor; Australia | Hans Santschi; Switzerland | Anthony Willis; Great Britain |
| Long jump A3 | Ronan Tynan; Ireland | Ngwe Tin; Burma | Gyi Aung; Burma |
| Long jump A4 | Ronnie Alsup; United States | Stephen Sargolia; Australia | Kazimierz Suchocki; Poland |
| Long jump A5 | Jerzy Szlezak; Poland | Jieping Zheng; China | Felix Abele; West Germany |
| Long jump A6 | Brett Holcombe; Australia | Jan Krauz; Poland | Peter Kirby; Australia |
| Long jump B1 | Yvan Bourdeau; Canada | Stefan Bidzinski; Poland | Antonio Delgado; Spain |
| Long jump B2 | Mineho Ozaki; Japan | | Walter Knors; West Germany |
| Long jump B2 | Ante Pehar; Yugoslavia | | Walter Knors; West Germany |
| Long jump B3 | Paul Smith; United States | Siegmund Hegeholz; East Germany | Garland Burress; United States |
| Long jump C7 | Mario Debaene; Belgium | Michel Bapte; France | Timo Solmari; Finland |
| Long jump C8 | David McNally; Ireland | Wolfgang Frenzel; West Germany | Antonio Carlos Martins; Portugal |
| Triple jump A5 | Jerzy Szlezak; Poland | Stephen Muir; Australia | |
| Triple jump A6 | Brett Holcombe; Australia | Odd Lovseth; Norway | Michael Morley; Australia |
| Triple jump B1 | Soedjeman Dipowidjojo; Netherlands | José Manuel Rodríguez; Spain | Pauli Viertonen; Finland |
| Triple jump B2 | Ante Pehar; Yugoslavia | Mineho Ozaki; Japan | Robert Latham; Great Britain |
| Triple jump B3 | Garland Burress; United States | Paul Smith; United States | Pawel Janowicz; Poland |
| Club throw 1A | Bart Dodson; United States | Francisco de las Fuentes; Mexico | S. Wilkins; United States |
| Club throw C2 | Zeljko Dereta; Yugoslavia | Tom Leahy; Ireland | Edwin Moore; Great Britain |
| Club throw C3 | Brendan Crean; Ireland | John Simpson; Great Britain | Joe Mulhall; Ireland |
| Club throw C4 | Norman Burns; Great Britain | Ragnar Anundsen; Norway | Rene Rivera; United States |
| Club throw C5 | Michael Quickert; West Germany | Paul McGinty; Great Britain | Eric Green; Great Britain |
| Club throw C6 | Anthony Griffin; Great Britain | Stefan Krieger; West Germany | Marvin Ross; United States |
| Club throw L1 | Lauritz Ellefsen; Norway | John Creedon; Ireland | Tom O'Brien; Great Britain |
| Discus throw 1C | Siegmar Henker; West Germany | Luiz Cláudio Pereira; Brazil | David Hynds; New Zealand |
| Discus throw 2 | Mats Laveborn; Sweden | Ryszard Tomaszewski; Poland | John Twomey; Ireland |
| Discus throw 3 | J. Sampaga; United States | Japheth Musyoki; Kenya | Jone Grant Malmin; Norway |
| Discus throw 4 | Terry Giddy; Australia | Remi van Ophem; Belgium | L. Kylma; Finland |
| Discus throw 5 | John Harris; Great Britain | Rudi van der Abbeele; France | Jacek Kowalik; Poland |
| Discus throw 6 | Nachman Wolf; Israel | Chaim Fliter; Israel | Raymond Clark; Sweden |
| Discus throw A1 | Richard Gould; United States | Klaus Detlef Lang; West Germany | John Jerome; United States |
| Discus throw A2 | David Bowers; United States | Kerrod McGregor; Australia | Andrzej Zmitrowicz; Poland |
| Discus throw A3 | Ronan Tynan; Ireland | Stanislaw Mielczarek; Poland | Bin Zhao; China |
| Discus throw A4 | Antoine Archie; United States | Hans Josefiak; West Germany | Jim McElhiney; United States |
| Discus throw A6–8 | Dan Leonard; Canada | Rinus de Moor; Netherlands | Harri Jauhiainen; Finland |
| Discus throw A9 | Robert Hoskins; United States | Philip Sadler; Great Britain | Jan Buczak; Poland |
| Discus throw B1 | Leroy Franks; United States | Pekka Kujala; Finland | Dieter Grundmann; West Germany |
| Discus throw B2 | Todd Hodgin; United States | James Mastro; United States | Mineho Ozaki; Japan |
| Discus throw C3 | Martin Frey; Switzerland | John Simpson; Great Britain | Jason Beasley; Great Britain |
| Discus throw C4 | Ragnar Anundsen; Norway | Eric Owens; United States | Antoine Delaune; France |
| Discus throw C5 | Giovanni Lo Jacono; Italy | Robert Gordon; United States | Manfred Atteneder; Austria |
| Discus throw C6 | Alex Hermans; Belgium | Walter Butt; Canada | Reinhard Kruger; West Germany |
| Discus throw C7 | Bjorn Tangen; Norway | Timo Solmari; Finland | Sven Hanson; Sweden |
| Discus throw C8 | Tom Becke; United States | Gerard McConnell; Great Britain | Denis Sevigny; Canada |
| Discus throw L1 | Lauritz Ellefsen; Norway | Tom O'Brien; Great Britain | Tony Worley; United States |
| Discus throw L2 | Robert Tee; Great Britain | Tibor Szabo; Hungary | Scott Schneider; United States |
| Discus throw L3 | Eric Pearce; Great Britain | Peter Sorensen; Sweden | Alfredo Martin; Spain |
| Discus throw L4 | Robert Lowe; Great Britain | Shaun Graham; United States | |
| Discus throw L5 | Richard Schule; West Germany | Wolfgang Maier; West Germany | Lajos Nyin; Hungary |
| Discus throw L6 | Kevin McGee; Great Britain | Derek Nixon; Great Britain | Joginder Singh Bedi; India |
| Distance throw C1 | William Johnston; Ireland | Claude Prophete; United States | David Pearce; Great Britain |
| Distance throw C2 | Ari Jonkari; Finland | Tom Cush; United States | Raimund Eckstein; West Germany |
| Javelin throw 1B | Douglas Heir; United States | P. Schmidt; West Germany | C. Weiss; France |
| Javelin throw 1C | Luiz Cláudio Pereira; Brazil | Christoph Etzlstorfer; Austria | Guenter Spiess; West Germany |
| Javelin throw 2 | Mats Laveborn; Sweden | J. Levestone; Netherlands | Hermann Nortmann; West Germany |
| Javelin throw 3 | Marjan Peternelj; Yugoslavia | J. Sampaga; United States | Jone Grant Malmin; Norway |
| Javelin throw 4 | Johann Schuhbauer; West Germany | Leslie Jones; Great Britain | Walter Pfaller; Austria |
| Javelin throw 5 | Jacek Kowalik; Poland | M. de Meyer; Belgium | K. Alqatam; Bahrain |
| Javelin throw 6 | Raymond Clark; Sweden | Nachman Wolf; Israel | Chaim Fliter; Israel |
| Javelin throw A1 | John Jerome; United States | Walter Zierl; Austria | Richard Bryant; United States |
| Javelin throw A2 | Kerrod McGregor; Australia | Jos van der Donk; Netherlands | Leon Sur; France |
| Javelin throw A3 | Hubert Berschgens; West Germany | Stanislaw Mielczarek; Poland | Peter Barnes; Great Britain |
| Javelin throw A4 | Antoine Archie; United States | Donald Dann; Australia | Gilbert Pflanzer; Austria |
| Javelin throw A6–8 | Harald Roth; Austria | Dan Leonard; Canada | Rinus de Moor; Netherlands |
| Javelin throw A9 | Jan Buczak; Poland | Philip Sadler; Great Britain | Robert Hoskins; United States |
| Javelin throw B1 | Terje Hansen; Norway | Miroslav Jancic; Yugoslavia | William Fennessee; United States |
| Javelin throw B2 | Timo Sulisalo; Finland | Reni Jackson; United States | Kalle Hautalahti; Finland |
| Javelin throw B3 | Raimo Heikkinen; Finland | Gabor Czuth; Hungary | Lucien Quemond; France |
| Javelin throw C3 | Martin Frey; Switzerland | John Simpson; Great Britain | Joe Mulhall; Ireland |
| Javelin throw C4 | Norman Burns; Great Britain | Mons Skjelvik; Norway | Martin Costello; Ireland |
| Javelin throw C5 | Michael Quickert; West Germany | Manfred Atteneder; Austria | Lionel Creyf; Belgium |
| Javelin throw C6 | Anthony Griffin; Great Britain | Stefan Krieger; West Germany | Reinhard Kruger; West Germany |
| Javelin throw C7 | Bjorn Tangen; Norway | Sven Hanson; Sweden | Michel Bapte; France |
| Javelin throw C8 | Tom Becke; United States | Franz Hlozek; Austria | Gert Bestebreurtje; Netherlands |
| Javelin throw L3 | Alfredo Martin; Spain | Peter Sorensen; Sweden | Eric Pearce; Great Britain |
| Javelin throw L5 | Wolfgang Maier; West Germany | Mathias Bingen; Luxembourg | Lajos Nyin; Hungary |
| Javelin throw L6 | Derek Nixon; Great Britain | Bhimrao Kesarkar; India | Joginder Singh Bedi; India |
| Precision throw C1 | Henrik Jorgensen; Denmark | William Johnston; Ireland | Ted Judge; United States |
| Shot put 1A | Edund Weber; West Germany | S. Wilkins; United States | Heinrich Koeberle; West Germany |
| Shot put 1B | Douglas Heir; United States | John Donahue; Canada | Bob Schmid; Canada |
| Shot put 1C | Luiz Cláudio Pereira; Brazil | Siegmar Henker; West Germany | Guenter Spiess; West Germany |
| Shot put 2 | Mats Laveborn; Sweden | Kevan McNicholas; Great Britain | Ryszard Tomaszewski; Poland |
| Shot put 3 | Japheth Musyoki; Kenya | Jone Grant Malmin; Norway | Marjan Peternelj; Yugoslavia |
| Shot put 4 | Jacques Martin; Canada | J. Zajac; United States | Leslie Jones; Great Britain |
| Shot put 5 | Jacek Kowalik; Poland | Rudi van der Abbeele; France | A. S. Adel; Egypt |
| Shot put 6 | Nachman Wolf; Israel | Raymond Clark; Sweden | Chaim Fliter; Israel |
| Shot put A1 | Peter Falkenhain; West Germany | John Jerome; United States | John Belanger; Canada |
| Shot put A2 | Andrzej Zmitrowicz; Poland | Rudolf Gandler; Austria | Isschar Navon; Israel |
| Shot put A3 | Ronan Tynan; Ireland | Hubert Berschgens; West Germany | Peter Palubicki; Canada |
| Shot put A4 | Hans Josefiak; West Germany | Zhen Yu Yao; China | Jim McElhiney; United States |
| Shot put A6–8 | Alois Beez; West Germany | Dan Leonard; Canada | Atte Karkkainen; Finland |
| Shot put A9 | Robert Hoskins; United States | Jan Buczak; Poland | Peter Kieweg; Austria |
| Shot put B1 | James Neppl; United States | Dieter Grundmann; West Germany | |
| Shot put B1 | James Neppl; United States | Jan Bengston; Norway | |
| Shot put B2 | James Mastro; United States | Todd Hodgin; United States | Kalle Hautalahti; Finland |
| Shot put B3 | Gosta Karlsson; Sweden | Kevin Szott; United States | Kari Luusua; Finland |
| Shot put C2 | Tom Leahy; Ireland | Zeljko Dereta; Yugoslavia | Steven Varden; Great Britain |
| Shot put C3 | Martin Frey; Switzerland | John Simpson; Great Britain | Joe Mulhall; Ireland |
| Shot put C4 | Antoine Delaune; France | Mons Skjelvik; Norway | Glenn Whitford; Canada |
| Shot put C5 | Manfred Atteneder; Austria | Giovanni Lo Jacono; Italy | Robert Gordon; United States |
| Shot put C6 | Alex Hermans; Belgium | Reinhard Kruger; West Germany | Bill Hunsberger; United States |
| Shot put C7 | Franjo Izlakar; Yugoslavia | Sven Hanson; Sweden | Timo Solmari; Finland |
| Shot put C8 | Tom Becke; United States | Denis Sevigny; Canada | Paul Taylor; Great Britain |
| Shot put L1 | Tom O'Brien; Great Britain | Tony Worley; United States | Lauritz Ellefsen; Norway |
| Shot put L2 | Tibor Szabo; Hungary | Robert Tee; Great Britain | Francis Genockey; Ireland |
| Shot put L3 | Peter Sorensen; Sweden | Eric Pearce; Great Britain | Alfredo Martins; Spain |
| Shot put L4 | Robert Lowe; Great Britain | Shaun Graham; United States | |
| Shot put L5 | Wolfgang Maier; West Germany | Richard Schule; West Germany | Christopher McKeown; Great Britain |
| Shot put L6 | Barry Antonio; Great Britain | Joginder Singh Bedi; India | Derek Nixon; Great Britain |
| Medicine ball thrust C2 | Tom Cush; United States | Gerardo López Rosas; Mexico | David Boland; Ireland |
| King of the straight - 100 m 1A–6 | Marc de Vos; Belgium | D. Barret; United States | Robert Courtney; New Zealand |
| Slalom (leg) C2 | Tom Cush; United States | Mogens Justesen; Denmark | Ken Thomas; Canada |
| Slalom 1A | Paolo D'Agostini; Italy | Francisco de las Fuentes; Mexico | Sebastian DeFrancesco; United States |
| Slalom 1B | Akihiko Onodera; Japan | C. Weiss; France | Michael Quinn; Australia |
| Slalom 1C | D. Miller; New Zealand | T. Sakurai; Japan | R. Zeyher; West Germany |
| Slalom 2 | Hermann Nortmann; West Germany | Motoharu Matsuo; Japan | Graham Condon; New Zealand |
| Slalom 3 | N. Ogawa; Japan | Chris Stoddard; Canada | Paul van Winkel; Belgium |
| Slalom 4 | Masanori Nakamura; Japan | Rolf Johansson; Sweden | Ruedi Sommer; Switzerland |
| Slalom 5 | Franz Nietlispach; Switzerland | John Federico; Australia | K. Nakahashi; Japan |
| Slalom C1 | Henrik Jorgensen; Denmark | Ted Judge; United States | Terry Hudson; Great Britain |
| Slalom C2 | Dermot Walsh; Ireland | Mike Bowen; United States | Brian Kelly; Canada |
| Slalom C3 | Ron Mullis; United States | Rene Rivera; United States | Jason Beasley; Great Britain |
| Slalom C4 | Eric Owens; United States | Robert Easton; Canada | Norman Burns; Great Britain |
| Pentathlon 1A | Bart Dodson; United States | Heinrich Koeberle; West Germany | H. Lobbering; West Germany |
| Pentathlon 1B | P. Schmidt; West Germany | Douglas Heir; United States | C. Weiss; France |
| Pentathlon 1C | Siegmar Henker; West Germany | Luiz Cláudio Pereira; Brazil | D. Wallen; United States |
| Pentathlon 2 | Mats Laveborn; Sweden | Hermann Nortmann; West Germany | Matti Leinonen; Finland |
| Pentathlon 3 | Jone Grant Malmin; Norway | Cornelio Núñez; Mexico | H. Kulzer; West Germany |
| Pentathlon 4 | Remi van Ophem; Belgium | Walter Pfaller; Austria | J. Zajac; United States |
| Pentathlon 5 | Rudi van der Abbeele; France | M. de Meyer; Belgium | Eugen Weiberle; West Germany |
| Pentathlon 6 | Raymond Clark; Sweden | Nachman Wolf; Israel | A. Pérez; Mexico |
| Pentathlon B1 | Miroslav Jancic; Yugoslavia | Laszlo Nemeth; Hungary | Svein Andersen; Norway |
| Pentathlon B2 | Mark Davies; Australia | Rudy de Meersman; Belgium | Zbigniew Duzikowski; Poland |
| Pentathlon B3 | Merle Whiteley; Great Britain | Siegmund Hegeholz; East Germany | Garland Burress; United States |

=== Women's events ===
| Event | Gold | Silver | Bronze |
|---|---|---|---|
| 20 m (arm) C2 | Nancy Anderson; United States | Ursula Pieperrek; West Germany | Valerie Smith; Great Britain |
| 60 m A1–3 | Youlanda Barker; United States | Valene Deconde; France | Melody Williamson; United States |
| 60 m C2 | Laura Misciagna; Canada | Terri Feinstein; United States | Maria Helena Martins; Portugal |
| 60 m C3 | Aileen Harper; Great Britain | Ans Bouwmeester; Netherlands | Elizabeth Fleming; United States |
| 60 m C6 | Loraine Charters; Great Britain | Amanda Kyffin; Great Britain | Marcia Malsar; Brazil |
| 100 m 1A | Martha Gustafson; Canada | Miracema Ferraz; Brazil | K. Holm; United States |
| 100 m 1B | J. Mora; United States | P. Delevacque; France | Aida Sheshani; Jordan |
| 100 m 1C | Tham Simpson; Canada | Gregoria Gutiérrez; Mexico | |
| 100 m 2 | Ingrid Lauridsen; Denmark | Glee Lyford; United States | B. Moore; United States |
| 100 m 3 | Debbi Kostelyk; Canada | S. Hadfield; New Zealand | Sabrina Bulleri; Italy |
| 100 m 4 | Monica Saker; Sweden | Milena Balsamo; Italy | Lilia Harasimczuk; Poland |
| 100 m 5 | Martine Prieur; France | A. Orvefors; Sweden | Juana Soto; Mexico |
| 100 m A4 | Reinhild Moller; West Germany | Karen Farmer; United States | Anne Farrell; Canada |
| 100 m A6 | Petra Buddelmeyer; West Germany | Barbara Joscelyne; Great Britain | Paivi Kaunisto; Finland |
| 100 m B1 | Purificacion Santamarta; Spain | Lori Bennett; United States | Joke van Rijswijk; Netherlands |
| 100 m B2 | Malgorzata Zalenska; Poland | Anelise Hermany; Brazil | Yali Ping; China |
| 100 m B3 | Beth Bishop; United States | Jihong Zhao; China | Carmen del Marquez; Mexico |
| 100 m C4 | Merja Jaaroa; Sweden | Kimala Searcy; United States | Susan Stevenson; Great Britain |
| 100 m C5 | Kathie Kessler; United States | Irene Larochelle; Canada | Sandy Morgan; Canada |
| 100 m C7 | Zita Andrey; Switzerland | Veronique Rochette; France | Theresa Ward; Ireland |
| 100 m C8 | Toshiko Kobayashi; Japan | Deborah Hearn; United States | |
| 100 m L2 | Wilma Lawrie; Great Britain | Terri Dixon; United States | |
| 100 m L3 | Twyanna Caldwell; United States | | |
| 200 m 1A | Martha Gustafson; Canada | Miracema Ferraz; Brazil | K. Holm; United States |
| 200 m 1B | J. Mora; United States | P. Delevacque; France | Aida Sheshani; Jordan |
| 200 m 1C | Tham Simpson; Canada | Gregoria Gutiérrez; Mexico | Judy Zelman; Canada |
| 200 m 2 | Ingrid Lauridsen; Denmark | Dora García; Mexico | B. Moore; United States |
| 200 m 3 | S. Hadfield; New Zealand | Debbi Kostelyk; Canada | Gabriele Beyer (Paralympian); West Germany |
| 200 m 4 | Monica Saker; Sweden | Connie Hansen; Denmark | Chris de Craene; Belgium |
| 200 m 5 | A. Orvefors; Sweden | A. Ieretti; Canada | Martine Prieur; France |
| 200 m A1–3 | Youlanda Barker; United States | Valene Deconde; France | Melody Williamson; United States |
| 200 m C2 | Laura Misciagna; Canada | Terri Feinstein; United States | Angela Davis; United States |
| 200 m C3 | Ans Bouwmeester; Netherlands | Elizabeth Fleming; United States | Elaine Hewitt; Canada |
| 200 m C6 | Marcia Malsar; Brazil | Amanda Kyffin; Great Britain | Loraine Charters; Great Britain |
| 200 m C7 | Veronique Rochette; France | Theresa Ward; Ireland | Anette Saeger; West Germany |
| 200 m C8 | Brenda Woodcock; Great Britain | Toshiko Kobayashi; Japan | |
| 400 m 1A | Martha Gustafson; Canada | Miracema Ferraz; Brazil | K. Holm; United States |
| 400 m 1B | J. Mora; United States | P. Delevacque; France | |
| 400 m 1C | Tham Simpson; Canada | Gregoria Gutiérrez; Mexico | Judy Zelman; Canada |
| 400 m 2 | Ingrid Lauridsen; Denmark | B. Moore; United States | Glee Lyford; United States |
| 400 m 3 | Debbi Kostelyk; Canada | Gabriele Beyer (Paralympian); West Germany | Ángeles Valdez; Mexico |
| 400 m 4 | Monica Saker; Sweden | Chris de Craene; Belgium | Connie Hansen; Denmark |
| 400 m 5 | A. Orvefors; Sweden | Angela Leriti; Canada | Martine Prieur; France |
| 400 m A4 | Reinhild Moller; West Germany | Karen Farmer; United States | Anne Farrell; Canada |
| 400 m B1 | Purificacion Santamarta; Spain | Refija Okic; Yugoslavia | Rossella Inverni; Italy |
| 400 m B2 | Carol Carr; Ireland | Malgorzata Zalenska; Poland | Emanuela Grigio; Italy |
| 400 m B3 | Beth Bishop; United States | Halina Wozniak; Poland | Jihong Zhao; China |
| 400 m C4 | Merja Jaaroa; Sweden | Kimala Searcy; United States | Cathy Brown; United States |
| 400 m C7 | Anette Saeger; West Germany | Veronique Rochette; France | Susanne Schmid; West Germany |
| 400 m C8 | Brenda Woodcock; Great Britain | Henrike Noller; West Germany | Toshiko Kobayashi; Japan |
| 400 m L2 | Wilma Lawrie; Great Britain | Terri Dixon; United States | |
| 800 m 1A | Martha Gustafson; Canada | Miracema Ferraz; Brazil | K. Holm; United States |
| 800 m 1C | Tham Simpson; Canada | J. Mora; United States | Gregoria Gutiérrez; Mexico |
| 800 m 2 | Ingrid Lauridsen; Denmark | Jayne Schiff; United States | B. Moore; United States |
| 800 m 3 | Gabriele Beyer (Paralympian); West Germany | Bernadette Melliger; Switzerland | Y. M. Wong; Hong Kong |
| 800 m 4 | Monica Saker; Sweden | D. Rakieki; Canada | S. Norman; United States |
| 800 m 5 | Angela Leriti; Canada | A. Orvefors; Sweden | Ana Beatriz Cisneros; Mexico |
| 800 m A6 | Julia Scarlett; Great Britain | Christelle Donnez; France | |
| 800 m B1 | Lori Bennett; United States | Rossella Inverni; Italy | Gabriele Rossmeier; West Germany |
| 800 m B2 | Malgorzata Zalenska; Poland | Emanuela Grigio; Italy | Anelise Hermany; Brazil |
| 800 m B3 | Wanda Watts; United States | Halina Wozniak; Poland | Agnese Grigio; Italy |
| 800 m C4 | Merja Jaaroa; Sweden | Kimala Searcy; United States | Cathy Brown; United States |
| 1000 m cross country C6 | Morna Cloonan; Ireland | Marcia Malsar; Brazil | Katrin Metz; West Germany |
| 1000 m cross country C7 | Susan Moucha; United States | Susanne Schmid; West Germany | Maria Albertina Cabral; Portugal |
| 1000 m cross country C8 | Brenda Woodcock; Great Britain | Ann Marie Roberts; United States | Deborah Hearn; United States |
| 1500 m 2 | Ingrid Lauridsen; Denmark | B. Moore; United States | Glee Lyford; United States |
| 1500 m 3 | Y. L. Mui; Hong Kong | Gabriele Beyer (Paralympian); West Germany | Y. M. Wong; Hong Kong |
| 1500 m 4 | Monica Saker; Sweden | Connie Hansen; Denmark | S. Norman; United States |
| 1500 m 5 | Angela Leriti; Canada | A. Orvefors; Sweden | Juana Soto; Mexico |
| 1500 m B1 | Margaret Heger; Austria | Cheryl Hurd; Canada | Susanne Wittje; West Germany |
| 1500 m B2 | Christine Nicholas; Canada | Carol Carr; Ireland | Malgorzata Zalenska; Poland |
| 1500 m B3 | Halina Wozniak; Poland | Norah Good; Canada | Wanda Watts; United States |
| 3000 m B1 | Cheryl Hurd; Canada | Margaret Heger; Austria | Prue-Anne Reynalds; Australia |
| 3000 m B2 | Christine Nicholas; Canada | Malgorzata Zalenska; Poland | Maria Serrat; United States |
| 3000 m B3 | Norah Good; Canada | Halina Wozniak; Poland | Kim Umbach; Canada |
| 5000 m 2 | Ingrid Lauridsen; Denmark | B. Moore; United States | Jayne Schiff; United States |
| 5000 m 3 | Gabriele Beyer (Paralympian); West Germany | Y. M. Wong; Hong Kong | Y. L. Mui; Hong Kong |
| 5000 m 4 | S. Norman; United States | Connie Hansen; Denmark | Jan Randles; Australia |
| 5000 m 5 | Angela Leriti; Canada | Juana Soto; Mexico | Y. Wong; Hong Kong |
| Marathon 2 | Jayne Schiff; United States | Patricia Hill; New Zealand | Dora Garcia; Mexico |
| Marathon 3 | Gabriele Beyer (Paralympian); West Germany | Julie Russell; Australia | D. Smith; Great Britain |
| Marathon 4 | Jan Randles; Australia | Kay McShane; Ireland | S. Norman; United States |
| Marathon 5 | Juana Soto; Mexico | Esperanza Belmont; Mexico | |
| 4 × 100 m relay 2–5 | Canada (CAN) | United States (USA) | Hong Kong (HKG) |
| 4 × 200 m relay 2–5 | United States (USA) | Hong Kong (HKG) | |
| 4 × 400 m relay 2–5 | Hong Kong (HKG) | United States (USA) | Italy (ITA); Silvana Vettorello; Milena Balsamo; Sabrina Bulleri; Christina Ploner |
| High jump A6 | Petra Buddelmeyer; West Germany | Julie Holley; United States | |
| High jump B1 | Catherine Welsby; Great Britain | Vera Kroes; Netherlands | Joke van Rijswijk; Netherlands |
| High jump B2 | Janet Rowley; United States | Margaret Murphy; Australia | |
| High jump B3 | Melba Houghton; United States | Jihong Zhao; China | |
| Long jump A2 | Valerie Woodbridge; Australia | | Cheril Barrer; Canada |
| Long jump A2 | Evelyn Dicks; Great Britain | | Cheril Barrer; Canada |
| Long jump A6 | Petra Buddelmeyer; West Germany | Paivi Kaunisto; Finland | Zofia Mielech; Poland |
| Long jump B1 | Joke van Rijswijk; Netherlands | Ursula Buschbeck; West Germany | Catherine Welsby; Great Britain |
| Long jump B2 | Yali Ping; China | Anelise Hermany; Brazil | Margaret Murphy; Australia |
| Long jump B3 | Jihong Zhao; China | Beth Bishop; United States | Mona Ullmann; Norway |
| Long jump C7 | Heike Bogie; West Germany | Veronique Rochette; France | Joanne Bouw; Canada |
| Long jump C8 | Toshiko Kobayashi; Japan | | |
| Club throw C2 | Valerie Smith; Great Britain | Jane Spitzley; United States | Monica O'Kelly; Ireland |
| Club throw C3 | Aileen Harper; Great Britain | Anne Trotman; Great Britain | Linda Fyfe; Great Britain |
| Club throw C4 | Joan Blalark; United States | Susan Stevenson; Great Britain | Helen Hilderley; Great Britain |
| Club throw C5 | Jane Peters; Great Britain | Denise Cook; New Zealand | Paula Knapper; Great Britain |
| Club throw C6 | Susanne Schmidt; Denmark | Morna Cloonan; Ireland | Tone Karlsen; Norway |
| Club throw L1 | Lisa Barker; Great Britain | | |
| Discus throw 1B | Martha Gustafson; Canada | Isabel Barr; Great Britain | Rosaleen Gallagher; Ireland |
| Discus throw 1C | Gregoria Gutiérrez; Mexico | Amintas Piedade; Brazil | |
| Discus throw 2 | Adelah Al-Roumi; Kuwait | Marie-Line Pollet; Belgium | Krystyna Owczarczyk; Poland |
| Discus throw 3 | Cathy Dunne; Ireland | Dorothy Ripley; Great Britain | Waltraud Hagenlocher; West Germany |
| Discus throw 4 | Kathryne Lynne Carlton; United States | Lilia Harasimczuk; Poland | M. Bartheiel; West Germany |
| Discus throw 5 | Martine Prieur; France | Elka Munker; West Germany | M. Ndlovu; Zimbabwe |
| Discus throw 6 | Zipora Rubin-Rosenbaum; Israel | Christine Morgan; Bahamas | |
| Discus throw A1 | Barbara Tomaszewska; Poland | Karen Davidson; Great Britain | Gaber Ali Nagat; Egypt |
| Discus throw A2 | Stephania Balta; Canada | Valerie Woodbridge; Australia | Donna Smith; Australia |
| Discus throw A4 | Karen Farmer; United States | Liisa Makela; Finland | |
| Discus throw A6 | Barbara Joscelyne; Great Britain | Zofia Mielech; Poland | Shuyun Wang; China |
| Discus throw B1 | Brigitte Otto-Lange; West Germany | Rita Gerstenberger; East Germany | Abdulla Nagla; Egypt |
| Discus throw B2 | Janet Rowley; United States | Michelle Message; Great Britain | Renata Honisch; Austria |
| Discus throw C3 | Cecelia Pierce; United States | Manyon Lyons; United States | Anne Trotman; Great Britain |
| Discus throw C4 | Ans Bouwmeester; Netherlands | Joan Blalark; United States | Helen Hilderley; Great Britain |
| Discus throw C5 | Denise Cook; New Zealand | Jane Peters; Great Britain | Susan Smith; Canada |
| Discus throw C6 | Amanda Kyffin; Great Britain | Tone Karlsen; Norway | Shirley Coleman; United States |
| Discus throw C7 | Zita Andrey; Switzerland | Mieke Roelofsen; Netherlands | Joanne Bouw; Canada |
| Discus throw C8 | Ann Marie Roberts; United States | Dinie Westrate; Netherlands | |
| Discus throw L2 | Mary McCann; Great Britain | Irene Hotchin; Great Britain | Mary Lou Baranski; United States |
| Discus throw L3 | Kim White; Great Britain | Twyanna Caldwell; United States | |
| Discus throw L5 | Liisa Solmari; Finland | Jozsafine Kiraly; Hungary | Dawn McDade; Great Britain |
| Discus throw L6 | Margaret Heald; Great Britain | Doris Kogelbauer; Austria | |
| Distance throw C1 | Maureen Gaynor; United States | Amanda Beverley Little; Great Britain | Debbie Willows; Canada |
| Distance throw C2 | Anne Swann; Great Britain | Maria Brooks; Great Britain | Harriet Lahman; Canada |
| Javelin throw 1B | Dzaier Neil; Great Britain | Rosaleen Gallagher; Ireland | R. Mukuya; Zimbabwe |
| Javelin throw 1C | Amintas Piedade; Brazil | Gregoria Gutiérrez; Mexico | Judy Zelman; Canada |
| Javelin throw 2 | Krystyna Owczarczyk; Poland | Margit Quell; West Germany | Annette Houk; United States |
| Javelin throw 3 | Milka Milinkovic; Yugoslavia | Dorothy Ripley; Great Britain | Lucy Wanjiru; Kenya |
| Javelin throw 4 | Julie Dowling; Australia | Kathryne Lynne Carlton; United States | Lilia Harasimczuk; Poland |
| Javelin throw 5 | Zipora Rubin-Rosenbaum; Israel | Martine Prieur; France | Elka Munker; West Germany |
| Javelin throw A1 | Gaber Ali Nagat; Egypt | Barbara Tomaszewska; Poland | Karen Davidson; Great Britain |
| Javelin throw A2 | Donna Smith; Australia | Stephania Balta; Canada | Melody Williamson; United States |
| Javelin throw A4 | Anne Farrell; Canada | Karen Farmer; United States | Liisa Makela; Finland |
| Javelin throw A6 | Zofia Mielech; Poland | Shuyun Wang; China | |
| Javelin throw B1 | Janice Moores; Great Britain | Ilse Bohning; West Germany | Rita Gerstenberger; East Germany |
| Javelin throw B2 | Karen Helmacy; United States | Mary Clark; Great Britain | Janet Rowley; United States |
| Javelin throw B3 | Lori Johnson; United States | Mona Ullmann; Norway | Merja Vahamaa; Finland |
| Javelin throw C3 | Linda Fyfe; Great Britain | Anne Trotman; Great Britain | Gaxiola Goerne Chico; Mexico |
| Javelin throw C4 | Susan Stevenson; Great Britain | Helen Hilderley; Great Britain | |
| Javelin throw C5 | Jane Peters; Great Britain | Denise Cook; New Zealand | Susan Smith; Canada |
| Javelin throw C6 | Tone Karlsen; Norway | Susanne Schmidt; Denmark | Amanda Kyffin; Great Britain |
| Javelin throw C7 | Joanne Bouw; Canada | Theresa Ward; Ireland | Birte Oddny Larsen; Norway |
| Javelin throw C8 | Judy Goodrich; Canada | Deborah Hearn; United States | Dinie Westrate; Netherlands |
| Javelin throw L2 | Mary McCann; Great Britain | Mary Lou Baranski; United States | |
| Javelin throw L3 | Kim White; Great Britain | Twyanna Caldwell; United States | |
| Javelin throw L5 | Rachael Marshall; Trinidad and Tobago | Jozsafine Kiraly; Hungary | Liisa Solmari; Finland |
| Precision throw C1 | Amanda Beverley Little; Great Britain | Debbie Willows; Canada | |
| Precision throw C1 | Amanda Beverley Little; Great Britain | Candy Demarois; United States | |
| Precision throw C1 | Amanda Beverley Little; Great Britain | Hayat Al-Sabih; Kuwait | |
| Shot put 1A | Miracema Ferraz; Brazil | Maha Bargouthi; Jordan | |
| Shot put 1B | Rosaleen Gallagher; Ireland | Isabel Barr; Great Britain | Dzaier Neil; Great Britain |
| Shot put 1C | Amintas Piedade; Brazil | Judy Zelman; Canada | Gregoria Gutiérrez; Mexico |
| Shot put 2 | Marie-Line Pollet; Belgium | Adelah Al-Roumi; Kuwait | Christina Dodrill; Ireland |
| Shot put 3 | Dorothy Ripley; Great Britain | Milka Milinkovic; Yugoslavia | Waltraud Hagenlocher; West Germany |
| Shot put 4 | M. Bartheiel; West Germany | Lilia Harasimczuk; Poland | D. Lapornik; Yugoslavia |
| Shot put 5 | Elka Munker; West Germany | Zipora Rubin-Rosenbaum; Israel | Martine Prieur; France |
| Shot put A1 | Karen Davidson; Great Britain | Barbara Tomaszewska; Poland | Gaber Ali Nagat; Egypt |
| Shot put A2 | Stephania Balta; Canada | Donna Smith; Australia | Valerie Woodbridge; Australia |
| Shot put A4 | Karen Farmer; United States | Liisa Makela; Finland | |
| Shot put A6 | Zofia Mielech; Poland | Barbara Joscelyne; Great Britain | |
| Shot put B1 | Vera Kroes; Netherlands | Ilse Bohning; West Germany | Brigitte Otto-Lange; West Germany |
| Shot put B2 | Janet Rowley; United States | Michelle Message; Great Britain | Gabriele Berghofer; Austria |
| Shot put B3 | Merja Vahamaa; Finland | Maria Hansson-Boe; Sweden | Mona Ullmann; Norway |
| Shot put C2 | Anne Swann; Great Britain | Valerie Smith; Great Britain | Monica O'Kelly; Ireland |
| Shot put C3 | Linda Fyfe; Great Britain | Gaxiola Goerne Chico; Mexico | Jennifer Keily; Ireland |
| Shot put C4 | Ans Bouwmeester; Netherlands | Susan Stevenson; Great Britain | Helen Hilderley; Great Britain |
| Shot put C5 | Denise Cook; New Zealand | Jane Peters; Great Britain | Martha Johnson; Canada |
| Shot put C6 | Morna Cloonan; Ireland | Amanda Kyffin; Great Britain | Tone Karlsen; Norway |
| Shot put C7 | Joanne Bouw; Canada | Birte Oddny Larsen; Norway | Mieke Roelofsen; Netherlands |
| Shot put C8 | Ann Marie Roberts; United States | Dinie Westrate; Netherlands | Deborah Hearn; United States |
| Shot put L2 | Irene Hotchin; Great Britain | Mary McCann; Great Britain | Mary Lou Baranski; United States |
| Shot put L3 | Kim White; Great Britain | Twyanna Caldwell; United States | |
| Shot put L5 | Rachael Marshall; Trinidad and Tobago | Jozsafine Kiraly; Hungary | Liisa Solmari; Finland |
| Medicine ball thrust C2 | Anne Swann; Great Britain | Maria Brooks; Great Britain | Harriet Lahman; Canada |
| Queen of the straight - 100 m 1A–6 | M. Saker; Sweden | Martine Prieur; France | Ingrid Lauridsen; Denmark |
| Slalom (leg) C2 | Laura Misciagna; Canada | Maria Brooks; Great Britain | Monica O'Kelly; Ireland |
| Slalom 1B | Ruth Rosenbaum; United States | Miracema Ferraz; Brazil | Rosaleen Gallagher; Ireland |
| Slalom 1C | Tham Simpson; Canada | Amintas Piedade; Brazil | Gregoria Gutiérrez; Mexico |
| Slalom 2 | Patricia Hill; New Zealand | Margit Quell; West Germany | Adelah Al-Roumi; Kuwait |
| Slalom 3 | K. Shiota; Japan | S. Hadfield; New Zealand | J. Dilorenzo; United States |
| Slalom 4 | Masami Morimoto; Japan | K. Yoshida; Japan | Kathryne Lynne Carlton; United States |
| Slalom 5 | K. Sugeno; Japan | T. Morita; Japan | Rosa Zaugg; Switzerland |
| Slalom C1 | Maureen Gaynor; United States | Lyn Coleman; Australia | Alison Barnes; Ireland |
| Slalom C2 | Nancy Anderson; United States | Valerie Smith; Great Britain | Ursula Pieperrek; West Germany |
| Slalom C3 | Aileen Harper; Great Britain | Anne Trotman; Great Britain | Jennifer Keily; Ireland |
| Slalom C4 | Clovee Fox; Great Britain | Joan Blalark; United States | Cathy Brown; United States |
| Pentathlon 2 | Marie-Line Pollet; Belgium | Patricia Hill; New Zealand | Margit Quell; West Germany |
| Pentathlon 3 | S. Hadfield; New Zealand | Waltraud Hagenlocher; West Germany | Julie Russell; Australia |
| Pentathlon 4 | Kathryne Lynne Carlton; United States | Lilia Harasimczuk; Poland | M. Bartheiel; West Germany |
| Pentathlon 5 | Juana Soto; Mexico | Elka Munker; West Germany | Ana Beatriz Cisneros; Mexico |
| Pentathlon 6 | Martine Prieur; France | Zipora Rubin-Rosenbaum; Israel | Christine Morgan; Bahamas |
| Pentathlon B1 | Margaret Heger; Austria | | |
| Pentathlon B2 | Gabriele Berghofer; Austria | Renata Honisch; Austria | Mary Clark; Great Britain |
| Pentathlon B3 | Mona Ullmann; Norway | Agnese Grigio; Italy | |

=== Mixed events ===
| Event | Gold | Silver | Bronze |
|---|---|---|---|
| 3×60 m relay C2–3 | United States (USA) | Canada (CAN) | Great Britain (GBR); Maria Brooks; Jason Beasley; Anne Trotman |

== See also ==
• Wheelchair racing at the 1984 Summer Olympics
