= Athletics at the 1984 Summer Paralympics – Men's marathon 2 =

Men's marathon 2 at the VII Paralympic Games
- Paralympic Athletics
- Competitors: 17 from 8 nations

Medalists
1st place, gold medalist(s)		Heinz Frei	Switzerland
2nd place, silver medalist(s)		Paul Clark	Canada
3rd place, bronze medalist(s)		Graham Condon	New Zealand

The Men's marathon 2 was a wheelchair marathon event in athletics at the 1984 Summer Paralympics. The race was won by Heinz Frei.

== Results ==
Place	Athlete	Time
1	Heinz Frei (SUI)	1:58:52
2	Paul Clark (CAN)	1:59:22
3	Graham Condon (NZL)	2:04:56
4	Alain Baillargeon (CAN)	2:08:03
5	Erwin Zemp (SUI)	2:09:24
6	Errol Marklein (FRG)	2:17:08
7	Josef Odermatt (SUI)	2:19:48
8	Hermann Nortmann (FRG)	2:29:07
9	Eusebio Valdez (MEX)	2:45:01
10	Greg Cochrane (NZL)	2:46:56
11	Ron Thompson (CAN)	2:47:03
12	Motoharu Matsuo (JPN)	2:50:14
13	Mike Nugent (AUS)	3:10:23
-	Robert Turner (AUS)	DNF
-	S. Solorzand (MEX)	DNF
-	Jorge Luna (MEX)	DNF
-	A. Jaffar (BRN)	DNF

== See also ==
- Marathon at the Paralympics
