= Athletics at the 1984 Summer Paralympics – Men's marathon 4 =

Men's marathon 4 at the VII Paralympic Games
- Paralympic Athletics
- Competitors: 17 from 10 nations

Medalists
1st place, gold medalist(s)		Rick Hansen	Canada
2nd place, silver medalist(s)		Jean-François Poitevin	France
3rd place, bronze medalist(s)		Ron Minor	Canada

The Men's marathon 4 was a wheelchair marathon event in athletics at the 1984 Summer Paralympics. The race was won by Rick Hansen.

== Results ==
Place	Athlete	Time
1	Rick Hansen (CAN)	1:49:53
2	Jean-François Poitevin (FRA)	1:58:51
3	Ron Minor (CAN)	1:58:53
4	John Boyko (CAN)	1:59:28
5	K. van Landeghen (BEL)	1:59:29
6	Uriel Martinez (MEX)	2:04:47
7	Jeff Wiseman (AUS)	2:05:55
8	F. Dessaune (FRA)	2:08:03
9	Ruben Rojas (MEX)	2:19:41
10	E. Martinez (MEX)	2:25:42
11	P. Jakobsen (NOR)	2:40:28
12	Paul Cartwright (GBR)	2:41:57
13	A. Mushaima (BRN)	3:00:30
-	Robert Courtney (NZL)	DNF
-	Mick Karaphillides (GBR)	DNF
-	Masanori Nakamura (JPN)	DNF
-	Peter Trotter (AUS)	DNF

== See also ==
- Marathon at the Paralympics
