= Wheelchair racing at the 1988 Summer Olympics =

Wheelchair racing at the 1988 Summer Olympics featured as a demonstration event within the athletics programme on 30 September 1988. There were two events, an 800 m race for women and a 1500 m race for men. Medals were not awarded, as the sport was not part of the official competition.

== Men's 1500 m wheelchair ==
Rank	Name	Nationality	Time	Notes
1st place, gold medalist(s)	Mustapha Badid	France	3:33.51	
2nd place, silver medalist(s)	Paul van Winkel	Belgium	3:33.61	
3rd place, bronze medalist(s)	Craig Blanchette	United States	3:34.37	
4	Farid Amarouche	France	3:50.40	
5	Gregor Golombek	West Germany	3:51.14	
—	André Viger	Canada	—	DNF
—	Robert Figl	West Germany	—	DNF
—	Yoo Hee-sang	South Korea	—	DNF

== Women's 800 m wheelchair ==
Rank	Name	Nationality	Time	Notes
1st place, gold medalist(s)	Sharon Hedrick	United States	2:11.49	
2nd place, silver medalist(s)	Connie Hansen	Denmark	2:18.29	
3rd place, bronze medalist(s)	Candace Cable-Brooks	United States	2:18.68	
4	Ingrid Lauridsen	Denmark	2:28.24	
5	Jeannette Jansen	Netherlands	2:28.56	
6	Ann Cody-Morris	United States	2:28.78	
7	Monica Wetterström	Sweden	2:30.28	
8	Kang Hyung-soon	South Korea	3:16.28	

== See also ==
- Athletics at the 1988 Summer Paralympics
