= Wheelchair racing at the 1984 Summer Olympics =

Wheelchair racing at the 1984 Summer Olympics featured as a demonstration event within the athletics programme on 11 August 1984. There were two events, an 800 m race for women and a 1500 m race for men.

== Men's 1500 m wheelchair ==
Rank	Name	Nationality	Time	Notes
1st place, gold medalist(s)	Paul van Winkel	Belgium	3:58.50	
2nd place, silver medalist(s)	Randy Snow	United States	4:00.02	
3rd place, bronze medalist(s)	André Viger	Canada	4:00.47	
4	Mel Fitzgerald	Canada	4:00.65	
5	Jürgen Geider	West Germany	4:00.71	
6	Peter Trotter	Australia	4:00.83	
7	Rick Hansen	Canada	4:02.75	
8	Jim Martinson	United States	4:21.37	

== Women's 800 m wheelchair ==
Rank	Name	Nationality	Time	Notes
1st place, gold medalist(s)	Sharon Hedrick	United States	2:15.73	WR
2nd place, silver medalist(s)	Monica Wetterström	Sweden	2:20.73	
3rd place, bronze medalist(s)	Candace Cable	United States	2:28.37	
4	Sacajuwea Hunter	United States	2:32.22	
5	Anna-Maria Orvefors	Sweden	2:32.49	
6	Angela Leriti	Canada	2:41.43	
7	Connie Hansen	Denmark	2:41.53	
8	Ingrid Lauridsen	Denmark	2:43.06	

== See also ==
- Athletics at the 1984 Summer Paralympics
