= New Zealand at the 1984 Summer Paralympics =

- IPC code: NZL
- NPC: Paralympics New Zealand
- Website: paralympics.org.nz

in Stoke Mandeville/New York
- Medals: Gold 8 Silver 10 Bronze 6 Total 24

Summer Paralympics appearances (overview)
- 1968; 1972; 1976; 1980; 1984; 1988; 1992; 1996; 2000; 2004; 2008; 2012; 2016; 2020; 2024

New Zealand won 24 medals at the 1984 Summer Paralympics: 8 golds, 10 silver and 6 bronze medals.

== Medallists ==
Medal	Name	Sport	Event
Gold	Robert Courtney	Athletics	Men's 100 metres 4
Gold	Dennis Miller	Athletics	Men's slalom 1C
Gold	Michelle Hadfield	Athletics	Women's 200 metres 3
Gold	Denise Cook	Athletics	Women's discus throw C5
Gold	Denise Cook	Athletics	Women's shot put C5
Gold	Michelle Hadfield	Athletics	Women's pentathlon 3
Gold	Patricia Hill	Athletics	Women's slalom 2
Gold	Roly Crichton	Swimming	Men's 50 metres freestyle 2
Silver	Michael O'Callaghan	Athletics	Men's 1500m A6
Silver	Michael O'Callaghan	Athletics	Men's 5000m A6
Silver	Michelle Hadfield	Athletics	Women's 100m 3
Silver	Patricia Hill	Athletics	Women's marathon 2
Silver	Denise Cook	Athletics	Women's club throw C5
Silver	Denise Cook	Athletics	Women's javelin throw C5
Silver	Michelle Hadfield	Athletics	Women's slalom 3
Silver	Patricia Hill	Athletics	Women's pentathlon 2
Silver	Roly Crichton	Swimming	Men's 25m butterfly 1C
Silver	Roly Crichton	Swimming	Men's 200m freestyle 2
Bronze	Graham Condon	Athletics	Men's marathon 2
Bronze	David Hynds	Athletics	Men's discus throw 1C
Bronze	Robert Courtney	Athletics	Men's King of the Straight 100m 1A-6
Bronze	Graham Condon	Athletics	Men's slalom 2
Bronze	Alison Smith	Shooting	Women's air rifle integrated
Bronze	Roly Crichton	Swimming	Men's 4x25m individual medley 2

== See also ==
- New Zealand at the Paralympics
- New Zealand at the 1984 Summer Olympics
