= Italy at the 1984 Summer Paralympics =

- IPC code: ITA
- NPC: Comitato Italiano Paralimpico
- Website: www.comitatoparalimpico.it (in Italian)

in Stoke Mandeville/New York
- Competitors: 61
- Medals Ranked 21st: Gold 9 Silver 19 Bronze 14 Total 42

Summer Paralympics appearances (overview)
- 1960; 1964; 1968; 1972; 1976; 1980; 1984; 1988; 1992; 1996; 2000; 2004; 2008; 2012; 2016; 2020; 2024

Italy competed at the 1984 Summer Paralympics in Stoke Mandeville, Great Britain and New York City, United States. 61 competitors from Italy won 42 medals including 9 gold, 19 silver and 14 bronze and finished 21st in the medal table.

== Medalists ==
=== Medals by sports ===
Sport	Gold	Silver	Bronze	Total
Athletics	4	8	7	19
Swimming	3	6	4	13
Fencing	2	5	0	7
Archery	0	0	2	2
Total	9	19	14	42

=== Gold medals ===
Medal	Athlete	Sport	Event
Gold	Paolo D'Agostini	Athletics	Slalom - class 1A
Gold	Giovanni Lo Jacono	Athletics	Discus - class C5
Gold	Giuseppe Pavan	Athletics	5000 m - class A6
Gold	Italo Sacchetto	Athletics	High jump - class B1
Gold	Luca Pancalli	Swimming	25 m breaststroke - class 1C
Gold	Luca Pancalli	Swimming	25 m butterfly - class 1C
Gold	Luca Pancalli	Swimming	25 m freestyle - class 1C
Gold	Santo Mangano	Fencing	Foil - class 1B
Gold	Giulio Martelli	Fencing	Epee - class 2-3

=== Silver medals ===
Medal	Athlete	Sport	Event
Silver	Milena Balsamo	Athletics	100 m - class 4
Silver	Claudio Foresti	Athletics	High jump - class B3
Silver	Agnese Grigio	Athletics	Pentathlon - class B3
Silver	Emanuela Grigio	Athletics	800 m - class B2
Silver	Rossella Inverni	Athletics	800 m - class B1
Silver	Giovanni Lo Jacono	Athletics	Shot put - class C5
Silver	Sergio Caleca	Swimming	100 m freestyle - class C7
Silver	Sergio Caleca	Swimming	50 m freestyle - class C7
Silver	Ernesto Giussani	Swimming	4×25 m individuali medley - class 2
Silver	Ernesto Giussani	Swimming	50 m dorso - class 2
Silver	Ernesto Giussani	Swimming	50 m freestyle - class 2
Silver	Sauro Nicolini	Swimming	100 m freestyle - class A6
Silver	Luca Pancalli	Swimming	100 m freestyle - class 1C
Silver	Luca Pancalli	Swimming	3×25 m medley- class 1C
Silver	Fabio Bernagozzi	Fencing	Foil - class 1B
Silver	Mariella Bertini	Fencing	Foil - class 2-3
Silver	Pierino Scarcella	Fencing	Sabre - class 2-3
Silver	Pierino Scarcella; Luigi Zonchi; Giulio Martelli; Giuseppe Alfieri	Fencing	Foil team
Silver	Pierino Scarcella; Enzo De Benedettis; Giuseppe Alfieri	Fencing	Sabre team

=== Bronze medals ===
Medal	Athlete	Sport	Event
Bronze	Irene Monaco	Archery	double FITA round
Bronze	Pasquale De Masi	Archery	double short mc round
Bronze	Sabrina Bulleri	Athletics	100m - class 3
Bronze	Sabrina Bulleri; Christina Ploner; Milena Balsamo; Silvana Vettorello	Athletics	relays 4×400 m class 2-5
Bronze	Agnese Grigio	Athletics	800 m class B3
Bronze	Emanuela Grigio	Athletics	400 m class B2
Bronze	Giulio Gusmeroli	Athletics	5000 m class B3
Bronze	Rossella Inverni	Athletics	400 m class B1
Bronze	Giuseppe Pavan	Athletics	1500 m class A6
Bronze	Ernesto Giussani	Swimming	25 m butterfly class 2
Bronze	Ernesto Giussani	Swimming	50 m breaststroke class 2
Bronze	Sauro Nicolini	Swimming	100 m backstroke class A6
Bronze	Sauro Nicolini	Swimming	200 m medley- class A6

=== Multi-medallists ===
Athlete	Sport	Gold	Silver	Bronze	Total
Luca Pancalli	Swimming	3	2	0	5

== See also ==
- Italy at the Paralympics
- Italy at the 1984 Summer Olympics
