= Wheelchair racing at the 1992 Summer Olympics =

Wheelchair racing at the 1992 Summer Olympics was featured as a demonstration event within the athletics programme on 2 August 1992. There were two events; an 800 m race for women and a 1500 m race for men. Medals were not awarded, as the sport was not part of the official competition.

== Men's 1500 m wheelchair ==
Rank	Name	Nationality	Time	Notes
1st place, gold medalist(s)	Claude Issorat	France	3:13.92	WR
2nd place, silver medalist(s)	Franz Nietlispach	Switzerland	3:14.07	
3rd place, bronze medalist(s)	Michael Noe	United States	3:14.76	
4	Jean-Marc Berset	Switzerland	3:14.95	
5	Scot Hollonbeck	United States	3:14.98	
6	Jorge Luna	Mexico	3.19.01	
7	Jeff Adams	Canada	3:26.06	
8	Ricardo Nunez Alcade	Mexico	—	DNF

== Women's 800 m wheelchair ==
Rank	Name	Nationality	Time	Notes
1st place, gold medalist(s)	Connie Hansen	Denmark	1:55.62	WR
2nd place, silver medalist(s)	Jean Driscoll	United States	1:56.56	
3rd place, bronze medalist(s)	Monica Wetterström	Sweden	1:56.57	
4	Jeannette Jansen	Netherlands	1:56.71	
5	Candace Cable	United States	1:57.45	
6	Barbara Maier	Germany	1:57.69	
7	Deanna Sodoma	United States	1:57.74	
8	Tanni Grey	Great Britain	1:57.75	

== See also ==
- Athletics at the 1992 Summer Paralympics
