= Archery at the 1984 Summer Paralympics – Men's double FITA round paraplegic =

Men's double FITA round 2-6 at the VII Paralympic Games
- Paralympic Archery
- Competitors: 11 from 7 nations

Medalists
| 1st place, gold medalist(s) | | Guy Grun | Belgium |
| 2nd place, silver medalist(s) | | J. Weijers | Netherlands |
| 3rd place, bronze medalist(s) | | Heikki Laukkanen | Finland |

The Men's Double Advanced Metric Round Paraplegic was an archery competition in the 1984 Summer Paralympics.

The gold medalist was Belgian Guy Grun.

== Results ==
| Rank | Athlete | Points |
|---|---|---|
| 1st place, gold medalist(s) | Guy Grun (BEL) | 2349 |
| 2nd place, silver medalist(s) | J. Weijers (NED) | 2348 |
| 3rd place, bronze medalist(s) | Heikki Laukkanen (FIN) | 2328 |
| 4 | Fabio Amadi (ITA) | 2310 |
| 5 | Yoshihiro Inoue (JPN) | 2287 |
| 6 | Jappie Walstra (NED) | 2281 |
| 7 | Kari Autio (FIN) | 2249 |
| 8 | Jim Buchanan (GBR) | 2234 |
| 9 | Hans-Jürgen Anuth (FRG) | 2224 |
| 10 | K. Fuchigami (JPN) | 2222 |
| 11 | Filip Bardoel (BEL) | 2214 |
| 12 | Pierre Delaunois (BEL) | 2211 |
| 13 | Jay Brown (USA) | 2210 |
| 14 | Giuliano Koten (ITA) | 2209 |
| 15 | Michael Harvey-Murray (GBR) | 2207 |
| 16 | Wolfgang Stieg (AUT) | 2203 |
| 17 | Walter Bollier (SUI) | 2194 |
| 18 | Roland Born (SUI) | 2186 |
| 18 | Alfredo Chavez (MEX) | 2186 |
| 20 | Ki Ki Jang (KOR) | 2179 |
| 21 | M. Petschnig (AUT) | 2178 |
| 22 | Patrick McLoughlin (IRL) | 2170 |
| 23 | Karl-Erik Jonsson (SWE) | 2154 |
| 24 | F. Blum (FRG) | 2111 |
| 25 | M. Goodling (USA) | 2107 |
| 26 | T. Sneders (NED) | 2097 |
| 27 | Sandy Gregory (GBR) | 2092 |
| 28 | Eric Klein (AUS) | 2085 |
| 29 | E. Hammel (FRG) | 2070 |
| 30 | J. Wallsten (SWE) | 2062 |
| 31 | T. Aasen (NOR) | 1932 |
| 32 | C. Focht (USA) | 1915 |
| 31 | S. Beduz (ITA) | 1726 |
