= Manfred Atteneder =

Austrian Paralympic athlete (born 1962)

Personal information
- Born: 3 September 1962 (age 64)

Sport
- Country: Austria
- Sport: Para-athletics; Paralympic powerlifting
- Events: Discus throw; Javelin throw; Shot put
Medal record
Men's para-athletics
Paralympic Games
Gold medal – first place	1984 New York	Shot put C5
Silver medal – second place	1984 New York	Javelin throw C5
Bronze medal – third place	1984 New York	Discus throw C5
Bronze medal – third place	1988 Seoul	Shot put C5
Men's powerlifting
Paralympic Games
Silver medal – second place	1984 New York	+90 kg

Manfred Atteneder (born 3 September 1962) is a former Austrian Paralympic athlete. He represented Austria at the 1984 Summer Paralympics and he won three medals in athletics, including the gold medal in the men's shot put C5 event, and a silver medal in powerlifting. He also represented Austria at the 1988 Summer Paralympics held in Seoul, South Korea and he won the bronze medal in the men's shot put C5 event. He also competed in the men's discus throw C5 and men's javelin throw C5 events.
