= Athletics at the 1984 Summer Paralympics – Men's 400 metres L4 =

Men's 400 metres L4 at the VII Paralympic Games
- Paralympic Athletics
- Competitors: 1 from 1 nation

Medalists
1st place, gold medalist(s)		John Fisher	Great Britain

The Men's 400 metres L4 was a sprinting event in athletics at the 1984 Summer Paralympics. It was unusual in that only one athlete took part. Although single athlete races had not been entirely uncommon during the 1960s, they had become very rare by 1984.

As the sole competitor, John Fisher of Great Britain needed only to complete the race in order to win gold. He did so in a time of 1:35.20.

Rank	Athlete	Time
1st place, gold medalist(s)	John Fisher (GBR)	1:35.20
2nd place, silver medalist(s)	no silver medal awarded	-
3rd place, bronze medalist(s)	no bronze medal awarded	-
