= Archery at the 1984 Summer Paralympics - Women's double short metric round paraplegic =

Women's double short metric round paraplegic at the VII Paralympic Games
- Paralympic Archery
- Competitors: 3 from 3 nations

Medalists
1st place, gold medalist(s)		M. P. Balme	France
2nd place, silver medalist(s)		Rosa Schweizer	Austria
3rd place, bronze medalist(s)		Anne Gray	Great Britain

The Women's double short metric round paraplegic was an archery competition at the 1984 Summer Paralympics.

The French archer M. P. Balme won the gold medal.

== Results ==
Rank	Athlete	Points
1st place, gold medalist(s)	M. P. Balme (FRA)	1078
2nd place, silver medalist(s)	Rosa Schweizer (AUT)	960
3rd place, bronze medalist(s)	Anne Gray (GBR)	940
