= Robert Courtney =

Robert Courtney may refer to:

- Robert Courtney (fraudster) (born 1952), American pharmacist and convicted fraudster
- Robert Courtney (Paralympian) (1959–2016), New Zealand Paralympian

== See also ==
- Robert I, Latin Emperor (died 1228), also known as Robert of Courtenay
- Bob Courtney (1922–2010), British-born South African actor and broadcaster
