= Rudolf Gandler =

Austrian Paralympic athlete

Sport
- Country: Austria
- Sport: Athletics
Medal record
Paralympic Games
Silver medal – second place	1984 Stoke Mandeville	Shot put A2

Rudolf Gandler is an Austrian Paralympic athlete. He competed at the 1984 Summer Paralympics in the men's discus throw A2 and men's shot put A2 events.

He won the silver medal in the men's shot put A2 event.
