= Gert Bestebreurtje =

Dutch Paralympic athlete

Sport
- Country: Netherlands
- Sport: Athletics
Medal record
Paralympic Games
Bronze medal – third place	1984 Stoke Mandeville	Javelin throw C8

Gert Bestebreurtje is a Dutch Paralympic athlete. He represented the Netherlands at the 1984 Summer Paralympics held in Stoke Mandeville, United Kingdom and New York City, United States. He competed in athletics at the 1984 Summer Paralympics in the men's javelin throw C8 and men's 100 metres C8 events. He won the bronze medal in the men's javelin throw C8 event.
