= Michael O'Callaghan (Paralympian) =

New Zealand Paralympian

Sport
- Country: New Zealand
- Sport: Athletics
Medal record
Men's para athletics
Representing New Zealand
Paralympic Games
Silver medal – second place	1984 New York & Stoke Mandeville	1500m A6
Silver medal – second place	1984 New York & Stoke Mandeville	5000m A6

Michael O'Callaghan is a New Zealand Paralympian who competed in athletics. At the 1984 Summer Paralympics, he won silver medals in the 1500m A6 and 5000m A6.
