= Ted Judge =

American Paralympic athlete

Medal record

Representing United States

Paralympic Games

Athletics
Silver medal – second place	1984 New York / Stoke Mandeville	Men's Slalom C1
Bronze medal – third place	1984 New York / Stoke Mandeville	Men's Precision Throw C1

Ted Judge is a paralympic athlete from the United States who primarily competes in category C1 events. Ted participated in two events at the 1984 Summer Paralympics in athletics. He won a silver and a bronze medal in both events.
