= Tom Cush =

American paralympic athlete

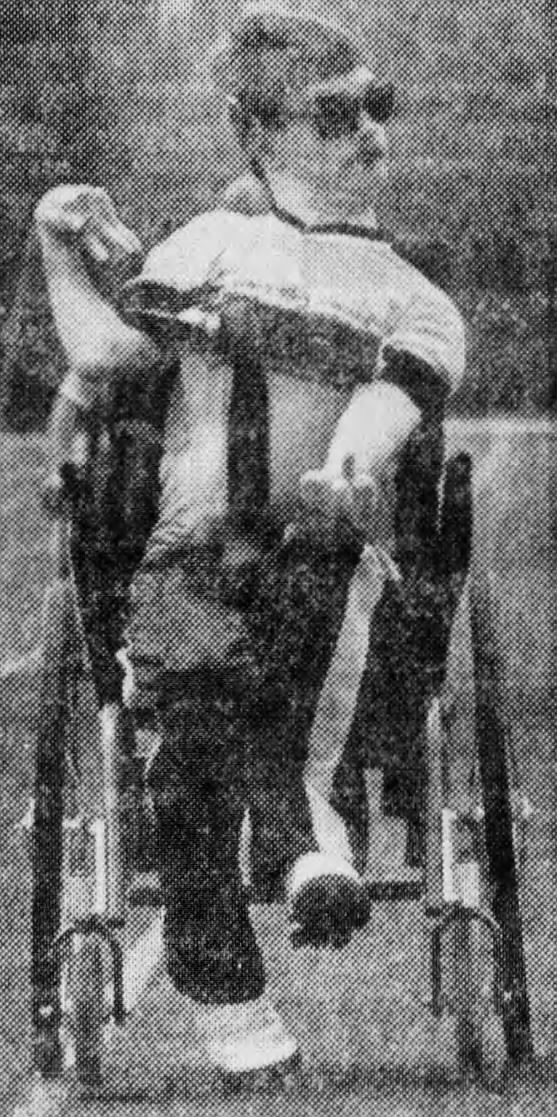
- Cush in 1988

Personal information
- Born: 1961 or 1962 (age 64–65)

Sport
- Country: United States
- Sport: Para-athletics
- Disability: Cerebral palsy
Medal record
Representing United States
Paralympic Games
Para-athletics
Silver medal – second place	1984 Stoke Mandeville / New York	Men's 60 m C2
Silver medal – second place	1984 Stoke Mandeville / New York	Men's 200 m C2
Gold medal – first place	1984 Stoke Mandeville / New York	Men's slalom (leg) C2
Silver medal – second place	1984 Stoke Mandeville / New York	Men's distance throw C2
Gold medal – first place	1984 Stoke Mandeville / New York	Men's medicine ball thrust C2

Tom Cush (born 1961/1962) (Note: Cush was 26 years old in 1988) is an American paralympic athlete. He competed at the 1984 Summer Paralympics.

== Life and career ==
Cush was born with cerebral palsy.

Cush represented the United States at the 1984 Summer Paralympics, winning three silver medals and two gold medals in athletics.
