= Amanda Beverley Little =

British Paralympic athlete

Personal information
- Nationality: British
- Born: 1962 (age 63–64) Swindon, Wiltshire

Sport
- Sport: Athletics
Medal record
Representing Great Britain
Paralympic Games
Athletics
Gold medal – first place	1984 New York / Stoke Mandeville	Women's Precision Throw C1
Silver medal – second place	1984 New York / Stoke Mandeville	Women's Distance Throw C1

Amanda Beverley Pedder (née Little) (born 1962 in Swindon) is a paralympic athlete from Great Britain competing mainly in category C1 events. She was born with cerebral palsy.

Amanda competed in two events in the 1984 Summer Paralympics in athletics. She won a gold and silver medal.

She got married the year after her Paralympic successes.
