= Keith Whiley =

British Paralympian

Personal information
- Full name: Keith Christopher Whiley
- Nationality: Great Britain
- Born: 3 October 1948 (age 77) Birmingham, Warwickshire, England, UK
Medal record
Representing United Kingdom
Paralympic Games
Athletics
Bronze medal – third place	1984 New York / Stoke Mandeville	Men's 100 m L3

Keith Christopher Whiley (born 3 October 1948) is a former multi-sport Paralympian from Great Britain and is the father of wheelchair tennis player Jordanne Whiley. In the 1984 Summer Paralympics he took part in athletics and shooting. He has the same disease as his daughter, osteogenesis imperfecta.

He won the bronze medal in Men's 100 m L3 1984 Summer Paralympics.
