= Karen Davidson =

Karen Davidson may refer to:

- Karen Davidson (athlete), former British wheelchair athlete
- Karen Lynn Davidson (born 1943), Latter-day Saint hymnwriter, author and literary critic
