= Christopher McKeown =

British Paralympic athlete

Sport
- Country: United Kingdom
- Sport: Para-athletics
Medal record
Men's para-athletics
Paralympic Games
Bronze medal – third place	1984 Stoke Mandeville/New York	Shot put L5

Christopher McKeown is a British Paralympic athlete. He won a bronze medal in the men's shot put L5 event at the 1984 Summer Paralympics.
