= Tham Simpson =

Canadian Paralympic athlete

Personal information
- Nationality: Canada
- Born: 8 April 1969 (age 57) Vietnam

Sport
- Sport: Athletics
Medal record
Representing Canada
Paralympic Games
Athletics
Gold medal – first place	1984 New York / Stoke Mandeville	Women's 100 m 1C
Gold medal – first place	1984 New York / Stoke Mandeville	Women's 200 m 1C
Gold medal – first place	1984 New York / Stoke Mandeville	Women's 400 m 1C
Gold medal – first place	1984 New York / Stoke Mandeville	Women's 800 m 1C
Gold medal – first place	1984 New York / Stoke Mandeville	Women's Slalom 1C

Tham Simpson (born 8 April 1969 in Vietnam) is a paralympic athlete from Canada competing mainly in category 1C events. She was born in Vietnam but adopted by Canadian parents in Toronto.

Simpson competed in the 1984 Summer Paralympics in athletics aged just 15, winning five gold medals.
