= Athletics at the 1988 Summer Paralympics – Women's 100 metres B1 =

Women's 100 metres B1 at the VIII Paralympic Games
- Paralympic Athletics
- Competitors: 6 from 6 nations

Medalists
1st place, gold medalist(s)		Purificacion Santamarta	Spain
2nd place, silver medalist(s)		Kim Bang-wol	South Korea
3rd place, bronze medalist(s)		Rossella Inverni	Italy

The Women's 100 metres B1 was a sprinting event in athletics at the 1988 Summer Paralympics in Seoul, for blind athletes. Six athletes took part, representing six nations. They included defending champion Purificacion Santamarta, of Spain, who retained her title, improving on her 1984 time by close to a second. Kim Bang-wol, competing in the event for the first time, won a silver medal for the host nation, while Italy's Rossella Inverni, who had finished eleventh four years earlier, improved significantly to win bronze. Fourth was Soviet sprint Tamara Pankova, whose country was making its first and only appearance at the Summer Paralympic Games.

The International Paralympic Committee's database does not record any heats, merely a final round in which the six athletes took part.

== Results ==
Place	Athlete	Time
1	Purificacion Santamarta (ESP)	13.48
2	Kim Bang-wol (KOR)	13.88
3	Rossella Inverni (ITA)	13.89
4	Tamara Pankova (URS)	14.00
5	Joke van Rijswijk (NED)	14.02
6	Lori Bennett (USA)	14.37
