= Maureen Gaynor =

American Paralympic athlete

Medal record

Representing United States

Paralympic Games

Athletics
Gold medal – first place	1984 New York / Stoke Mandeville	Women's Distance Throw C1
Gold medal – first place	1984 New York / Stoke Mandeville	Women's Slalom C1

Maureen Gaynor is a paralympic athlete from the United States competing mainly in category C1 events.

Gaynor competed in two events in the 1984 Summer Paralympics in athletics. She won gold medals in both.
