= Ingrid Lauridsen =

Danish wheelchair racer

Personal information
- National team: Denmark
- Born: 5 March 1960 (age 66) Tistrup, Varde, Denmark

Sport
- Country: Denmark
- Sport: Wheelchair racing
- Disability: Paraplegia
- Disability class: TW3
Medal record
Women's Para-athletics
Event	1st	2nd	3rd
Paralympic Games	8	5	4
IPC Athletics World Championships	0	1	2
Total	8	6	6
Representing Denmark
Paralympic Games
Gold medal – first place	1984 New York/Stoke Mandeville	Women's 100 m 2
Gold medal – first place	1984 New York/Stoke Mandeville	Women's 200 m 2
Gold medal – first place	1984 New York/Stoke Mandeville	Women's 400 m 2
Gold medal – first place	1984 New York/Stoke Mandeville	Women's 800 m 2
Gold medal – first place	1984 New York/Stoke Mandeville	Women's 1500 m 2
Gold medal – first place	1984 New York/Stoke Mandeville	Women's 5000 m 2
Gold medal – first place	1988 Seoul	Women's 400 m 2
Gold medal – first place	1988 Seoul	Women's 800 m 2
Silver medal – second place	1980 Arnhem	Women's Slalom 2
Silver medal – second place	1992 Barcelona	Women's 100 m TW3
Silver medal – second place	1992 Barcelona	Women's 200 m TW3
Silver medal – second place	1992 Barcelona	Women's 400 m TW3
Silver medal – second place	1992 Barcelona	Women's 800 m TW3
Bronze medal – third place	1984 New York/Stoke Mandeville	Women's Queen of the Straight - 100 m 1A-6
Bronze medal – third place	1988 Seoul	Women's 1500 m 2
Bronze medal – third place	1988 Seoul	Women's 5000 m 2
Bronze medal – third place	1988 Seoul	Women's 10000 m 2
IPC Athletics World Championships
Silver medal – second place	1994 Berlin	Women's T3 100 metres wheelchair
Bronze medal – third place	1994 Berlin	Women's T3 200 metres wheelchair
Bronze medal – third place	1994 Berlin	Women's T3 400 metres wheelchair

Ingrid Lauridsen (born 5 March 1960) is a Danish TW3 classified wheelchair racer who competed in the Paralympic Games and the IPC Athletics World Championships. She won a silver medal at the 1980 Summer Paralympics in Arnhem and took six gold medals and one bronze medal at the 1984 Summer Paralympics in New York and Stoke Mandeville. Lauridsen finished third in the women's 800 metres wheelchair event at the 1987 World Championships in Athletics in Rome. She took two gold medals and three bronze medals at the 1988 Summer Paralympics in Seoul and four silver medals at the 1992 Summer Paralympics in Barcelona. Lauridsen won three medals at the 1994 IPC Athletics World Championships in Berlin.

== Biography ==
She was born in Tistrup, Varde, Denmark, on 5 March 1960. Lauridsen is a paraplegic and used a wheelchair during competition with a classification of TW3 by the International Paralympic Committee. At the 1980 Summer Paralympics in Arnhem, the Netherlands, she won the silver medal in the women's Slalom 2 event. Lauridsen also competed in each of the women's 60 metres 2, women's 200 metres 2, the women's shot put 2 and the women's discus throw 2 but without winning a medal in any of those events.

She attained qualification to the demonstration wheelchair racing events of the 1984 Summer Olympics in Los Angeles at an event held in Uniondale, New York. Lauridsen finished the women's 800 metres wheelchair event in eighth position. She also partook in the 1984 Summer Paralympics in both New York, United States, and Stoke Mandeville, United Kingdom. Lauridsen finished first in each of the women's 100 metres 2; women's 200 metres 2; women's 400 metres 2; women's 800 metres 2; women's 1500 metres 2 and the women's 5000 metres 2 competitions. She also claimed a bronze medal in the women's queen of the straight 100 metres 1A-6 event.

In January 1986, she reset a new world record she had held at the Australian National Wheelchair Games in Adelaide in the women's Class 2 paraplegic 100 metres in winning a Class 4 competition. Lauridsen finished third to claim the bronze medal in the women's 800 metres wheelchair event at the 1987 World Championships in Athletics in Rome. At the 1988 Summer Paralympics in Seoul, South Korea, she won two gold medals in both the women's 400 metres 2 and the women's 800 metres 2 competitions. Lauridsen also secured three bronze medals in each of the women's 1500 metres 2, the women's 5000 metres 2 and the women's 10000 metres 2 events.

She also competed in the wheelchair racing competitions at the 1988 Summer Olympics. Lauridsen finished in fourth position at the women's 800 metres wheelchair race. She placed, fourth in the women's 800 paraplegic event of the 1990 Eight-Country Metro Toronto Wheelchair Challenge Track and Field in Toronto, Canada, and went on to finish second in the women's wheelchair race of the 1990 London Marathon and in the women's marathon wheelchair event at the 1990 Stoke Mandeville Games in Aylesbury, England. Lauridsen also won the women's wheelchair division of the 1990 Canberra Marathon with a new course record. She partook in the 1992 Summer Paralympics in Barcelona, Spain. Laurdisen won silver medals in each of the women's 100 metres TW3; women's 200 metres TW3; women's 400 metres TW3 and the women's 800 metres TW3. Lauridsen also entered the women's 1500 metres TW3-4 competition, finishing tenth overall.

She entered the 1994 IPC Athletics World Championships in Berlin, Germany. Lauridsen was second in the women's T3 100 metres wheelchair, and third in each of the women's T3 400 metres wheelchair and the women's T3 200 metres wheelchair competitions.
