= Eric Pearce (athlete) =

British Paralympic athlete

Personal information
- Born: 1936 Nottingham, England
- Died: 1997 (aged 60–61)

Sport
- Country: Great Britain
- Sport: Paralympic athletics
- Disability class: L3
Medal record
Paralympic athletics
Representing Great Britain
Paralympic Games
Gold medal – first place	1984 New York	Discus throw L3
Silver medal – second place	1984 New York	Shot put L3
Bronze medal – third place	1984 New York	Javelin throw L3

Eric Pearce (1936–1997) was an English Paralympic athlete, who represented Great Britain at the 1984 Summer Paralympics.

== Biography ==
Pearce was born in Nottingham. After leaving school, he went to work at Gedling Colliery before joining the RAF. Eric spent 12 years in the RAF during which he was stationed in Cypress, Singapore, Darlington and the Isle of Man.

After leaving the RAF he returned to work at Gedling Colliery. During this time, he was involved in an accident whereby a roof collapsed on him, injuring his back and leaving him hospitalised for several months. He was unable to work again because he had trouble walking and was reliant on a wheelchair.

After the incident, he began helping disabled children with sports. He also started to train himself to have something to focus on. Eventually, he was offered a place on the team to represent Great Britain at the 1984 Summer Paralympics in New York City.

Soon after, he had a mild heart attack whilst on holiday in Las Vegas, ending his sporting career.

Pearce died on 31 March 1997 from pancreatic cancer. He was 61 years old.
