= Alison Smith (sport shooter) =

New Zealand Paralympian

Sport
- Country: New Zealand
- Sport: Shooting
Medal record
Women's shooting para sport
Representing New Zealand
Paralympic Games
Bronze medal – third place	1984 New York & Stoke Mandeville	Air Rifle; Integrated

Alison Smith is a New Zealand Paralympian who competed in sport shooting. At the 1984 Summer Paralympics, she won a bronze medal in the Air Rifle Integrated event.
