= Robert Lowe (athlete) =

British Paralympic athlete

Personal information
- Nationality: Great Britain
- Born: 3 May 1945 (age 81)
- Died: 23 August 2023 Bolton
Medal record
Representing Great Britain
Paralympic Games
Athletics
| Gold medal – first place | 1984 New York / Stoke Mandeville | Men's Discus Throw L4 |
| Gold medal – first place | 1984 New York / Stoke Mandeville | Men's Shot Put L4 |

Robert Lowe (born 4 May 1945) is a former Paralympic athlete from Great Britain competing mainly in throwing events.

Lowe represented Great Britain at the 1984 Summer Paralympics in athletics taking a clean sweep of the field events of Javelin, Shot Put and Discus.

After he retired as a competitor, Lowe went onto coach the Great Britain bowls team at the 1988 Summer Paralympics in Seoul and was the International Paralympic Committee’s Chairman for Bowls from 1988-1996.

Robert (or Bob to friends) was a lifelong Amateur Radio enthusiast, holding the CallSign G0FRL. Bob spent many years helping others to pass their Amateur Radio exams and he devoted many hours teaching Morse Code.

Lowe died on 23 August 2023.

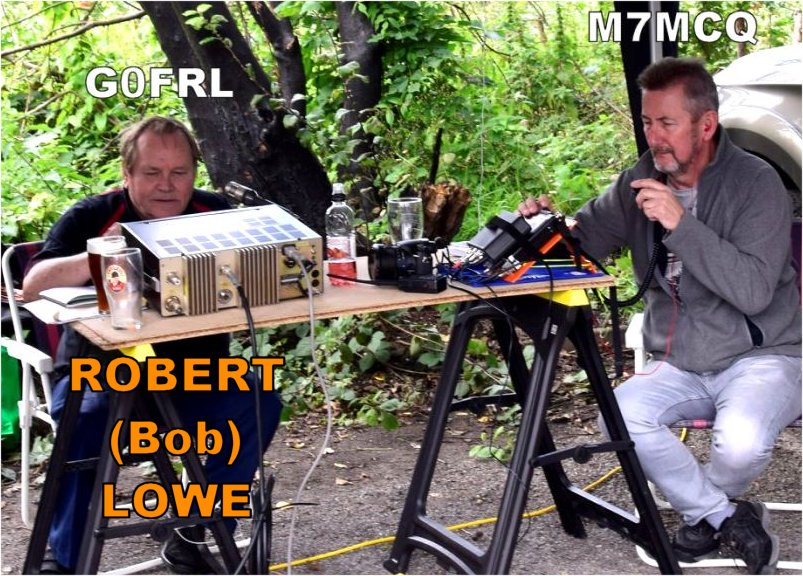
Robert Lowe, former Olympic athlete on his radio.
