= Kris Lenzo =

American paralympic athlete

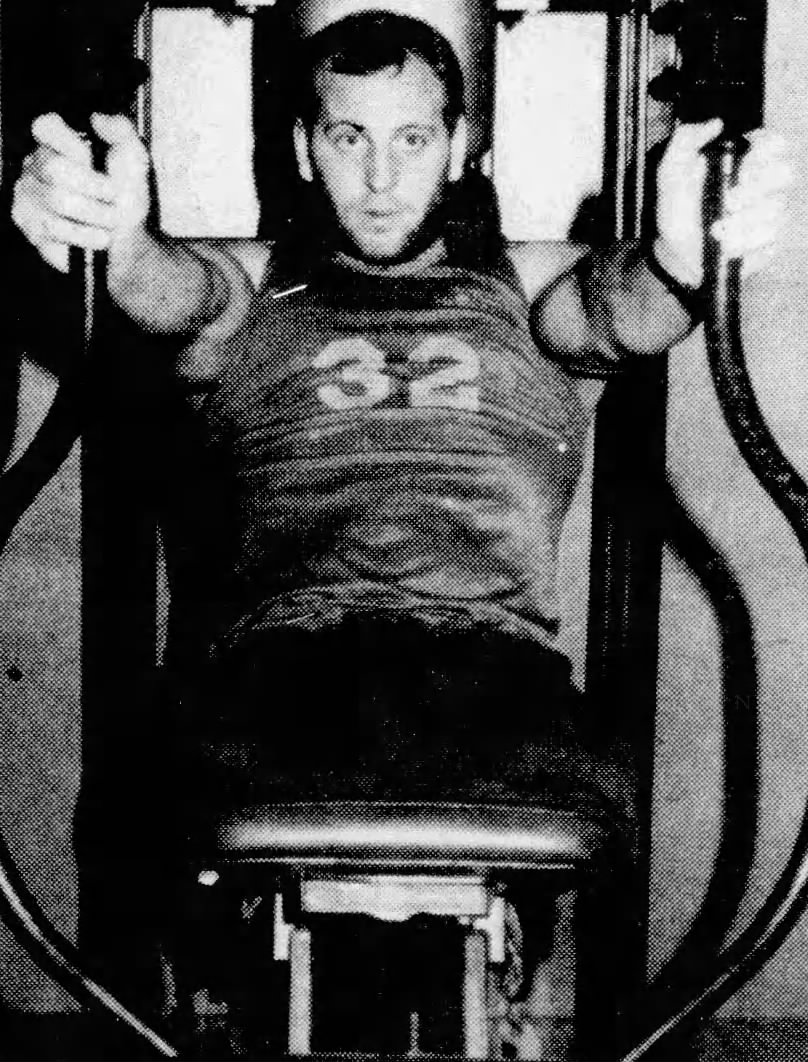
- Lenzo in 1984

Personal information
- Born: 1959 or 1960 (age 65–66)
- Education: University of Michigan

Sport
- Country: United States
- Sport: Para-athletics
Medal record
Representing United States
Paralympic Games
Para-athletics
Silver medal – second place	1984 Stoke Mandeville / New York	Men's 100 m A1-3
Gold medal – first place	1984 Stoke Mandeville / New York	Men’s 400 m A1-3

Kris Lenzo (born 1959/1960) (Note: Lenzo was 56 years old in 2016) is an American paralympic athlete. He competed at the 1984 Summer Paralympics.

== Life and career ==
Lenzo attended the University of Michigan, earning his psychology degree. He was a sales representative for Linden Medical Supply.

Lenzo represented the United States at the 1984 Summer Paralympics, winning a gold and silver medal in athletics.
