= Kevan McNicholas =

British Paralympic athlete

Personal information
- Died: 11 November 2014

Sport
- Country: United Kingdom
- Sport: Para-athletics
Medal record
Paralympic athletics
Representing Great Britain
Paralympic Games
Silver medal – second place	1984 New York	Shot put 2
Silver medal – second place	1988 Seoul	Shot put 2

Kevan McNicholas was a British Paralympic athlete. In 1984, he won the silver medal in the men's shot put 2 event at the 1984 Summer Paralympics held in Stoke Mandeville, United Kingdom and New York City, United States.

In 1988, he won the silver medal in the men's shot put 2 event at the 1988 Summer Paralympics held in Seoul, South Korea.

McNicholas died on 11 November 2014.
