= Ans Bouwmeester =

Dutch Paralympic athlete

Sport
- Country: Netherlands
- Sport: Para-athletics
Medal record
Paralympic athletics
Representing Netherlands
Paralympic Games
Gold medal – first place	1984 Stoke Mandeville	200m C3
Gold medal – first place	1984 Stoke Mandeville	Discus throw C4
Gold medal – first place	1984 Stoke Mandeville	Shot put C4
Gold medal – first place	1988 Seoul	Shot put C4
Silver medal – second place	1984 Stoke Mandeville	60m C3

Ans Bouwmeester is a Dutch Paralympic athlete. She won three gold medals at the 1984 Summer Paralympics. She won the gold medal in the women's 200 metre C3 event, in the women's discus throw C4 event and in the women's shot put C4 event. She also won the silver medal in the women's 60 metre C3 event.

In 1988, she won the gold medal in the women's shot put C4 event at the Summer Paralympics held in Seoul, South Korea.
