= Laura Misciagna =

Canadian Paralympic athlete

Personal information
- Born: 29 February 1960 (age 66) Toronto, Ontario, Canada

Sport
- Country: Canada
- Sport: Athletics
Medal record
Representing Canada
Paralympic Games
Athletics
Gold medal – first place	1984 New York / Stoke Mandeville	Women's 200 m C2
Gold medal – first place	1984 New York / Stoke Mandeville	Women's 60 m C2
Gold medal – first place	1984 New York / Stoke Mandeville	Women's Slalom (Leg) C2
Bronze medal – third place	1988 Seoul	Mixed 4×100 m C2-3

Laura Misciagna (born 29 February 1960 in Toronto, Ontario) is a paralympic athlete from Canada competing mainly in category C2 events.

Misciagna competed in the 1984 Summer Paralympics in athletics and boccia, winning gold medals in the athletics in Women's 200 metres, 60 metres and Slalom. In the 1988 Summer Paralympics, she won bronze in the mixed 4×100 metres.
