= Robert Easton (athlete) =

Canadian wheelchair racer

Personal information
- Nationality: Canadian
- Born: 1960 or 1961 (age 65–66) Edmonton, Alberta, Canada

Sport
- Country: Canada
- Sport: Wheelchair racing Athletics
- Disability: Cerebral palsy
Medal record
Para athletics
Representing Canada
Paralympic Games
Gold medal – first place	1988 Seoul	100m C4/C5
Gold medal – first place	1988 Seoul	200m C4/C5
Gold medal – first place	1988 Seoul	400m C4/C5
Gold medal – first place	1984 Stoke Mandeville / New York	100m C4
Gold medal – first place	1984 Stoke Mandeville / New York	400m C4
Gold medal – first place	1984 Stoke Mandeville / New York	800m C4
Silver medal – second place	1984 Stoke Mandeville / New York	Slalom C4

Robert Easton (born 1960 or 1961) is a Canadian retired Paralympic athlete who competed in wheelchair racing. He is a member of the Canadian Paralympic Committee Hall of Fame, the Alberta Sports Hall of Fame and Canadian Cerebral Palsy Sports Hall of Fame.

Easton is from Edmonton, Alberta and has cerebral palsy. He initially played wheelchair basketball prior to taking to wheelchair racing in 1977. An accountant by profession, he later moved to Victoria, British Columbia and served as Chief Financial Officer for the Ministry of Healthy Living and Sport and as an executive director with the Ministry of Community, Sport and Cultural Development.
