= William Johnston (athlete) =

Irish Paralympic athlete

Personal information
- Nationality: Irish
- Born: 19 April 1964 (age 62)
Medal record
Representing Ireland
Paralympic Games
Athletics
Gold medal – first place	1984 New York / Stoke Mandeville	Men's Distance Throw C1
Silver medal – second place	1984 New York / Stoke Mandeville	Men's Precision Throw C1
Boccia
Bronze medal – third place	1992 Barcelona	Mixed Team C1-C2

William Johnston is a paralympic athlete from Ireland competing mainly in category C1 events.

William has competed in three consecutive Paralympic Games. In 1984, he won a gold and silver medal. In 1988, he failed to win a medal. In 1992, he won a bronze medal as part of Ireland's mixed boccia team.
