= Judy Zelman =

Canadian Paralympic athlete

Personal information
- Full name: Judith Zelman
- Born: 15 May 1967 Ottawa, Ontario
- Died: 3 February 2007 (aged 39) Ottawa, Ontario

Sport
- Country: Canada
- Sport: Various
Medal record
Representing Canada
Paralympic Games
Athletics
Silver medal – second place	1984 New York / Stoke Mandeville	Women's Shot Put 1C
Bronze medal – third place	1984 New York / Stoke Mandeville	Women's 200 m 1C
Bronze medal – third place	1984 New York / Stoke Mandeville	Women's Javelin 1C
Bronze medal – third place	1984 New York / Stoke Mandeville	Women's 200 m 1C

Judith (Judy) Zelman (born 16 May 1967 in Ottawa, Ontario - died 3 February 2007) was a paralympic athlete from Canada competing mainly in category 1C events.

Zelman competed in the 1984 Summer Paralympics in athletics. Her best result came in the Women's Shot Put 1C where she won a silver medal. Her other three medals came in the form of bronze medals.

Zelman also competed in the 1988 Summer Paralympics and 1992 Summer Paralympics. She died on 3 February 2007 after a brief battle with breast cancer, aged 39
