= David Pearce (athlete) =

British Paralympic athlete

Medal record

Representing Great Britain

Paralympic Games

Athletics
Bronze medal – third place	1984 New York / Stoke Mandeville	Men's Distance Throw C1

David Pearce is a paralympic athlete from Great Britain competing mainly in category C1 events. Pearce competed in three events in the 1984 Summer Paralympics in athletics. He won the bronze medal in men's Distance Throw.
