= Emanuela Grigio =

Italian Paralympic athlete (born 1964)

Personal information
- Born: 7 October 1964 (age 61) Albignasego, Italy

Sport
- Country: Italy
- Sport: Paralympic athletics
- Disability class: B2
- Retired: 1992
Medal record
Paralympic athletics
Representing Italy
Paralympic Games
Silver medal – second place	1984 Stoke Mandeville/New York	800m B2
Bronze medal – third place	1984 Stoke Mandeville/New York	400m B2

Emanuela Grigio (born 7 October 1964) is a visually impaired Italian Paralympic athlete. She won a silver medal and bronze medal.

== Career ==
She competed at the 1984 Summer Paralympic Games in New York. She won a silver medal, in the 800 meters B2, and a bronze medal in the 400 meters B2.

At the 1988 Summer Paralympic Games in she competed, and earned a fourth place in 400 meters B2, and a sixth place in 800 meters B2.

Later she participated in the IBSA European Championships in Rome, in 1985.

She retired from her international athletic career before 1992, devoting herself exclusively to torball (a sport not present at the Paralympics), which she practiced nationally and internationally.

She is the sister of Agnese Grigio.
