= Claude Prophete =

American paralympic athlete

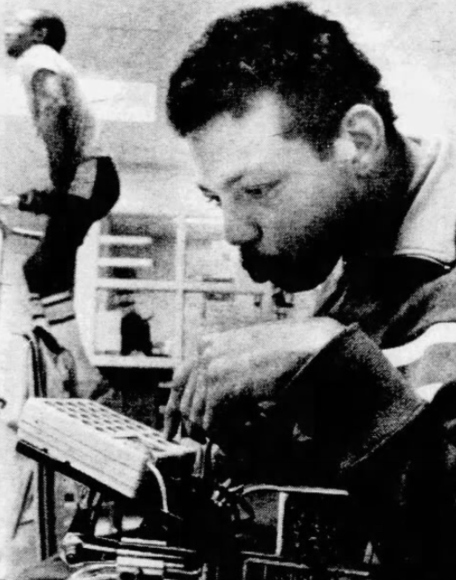
- Prophete in 1984

Personal information
- Born: 1959 or 1960 (age 66–67)

Sport
- Country: United States
- Sport: Para-athletics
- Disability class: CP1 (Note: Prophete played in Class P1 in beanbag throw (distance))
Medal record
Representing United States
Paralympic Games
Para-athletics
Silver medal – second place	1984 Stoke Mandeville / New York	Men's distance throw C1

Claude Prophete (born 1959/1960) (Note: Prophete was 24 years old in 1984) is an American paralympic athlete. He competed at the 1984 Summer Paralympics.

== Life and career ==
Prophete was a member of the New York Knights Team.

Phophete competed at the 1984 Summer Paralympics, winning the silver medal in the men's distance throw C1 event.
