= Peter Trotter =

Australian wheelchair racer

Personal information
- Full name: Peter Thomas Trotter
- Nationality: Australia
- Born: 22 May 1956
- Died: 21 October 2014 (aged 58) Sydney, New South Wales, Australia
Medal record
Men's wheelchair racing
Representing Australia
Paralympic Games
| Gold medal – first place | 1984 New York & Stoke Mandeville | 5,000 m 4 |
| Silver medal – second place | 1984 New York & Stoke Mandeville | 5,000 m 4 |
| Bronze medal – third place | 1984 New York & Stoke Mandeville | 800 m 4 |

Peter Thomas Trotter (22 May 1956 – 21 October 2014) was an Australian Paralympic wheelchair racer.

Trotter lost the use of his legs at the age of 12 following complications from a spinal aneurysm. Trotter became a paraplegic when he dived into the Ulladulla sea pool and had spinal aneurysm.

== Athletics career ==
At the 1984 New York & Stoke Mandeville Paralympics, he won a gold medal in the Men's 5,000 m 4 event, a silver medal in the Men's 1,500 m 4 event and a bronze medal in the Men's 800 m 4 event. He was the first Australian to compete in the 1500 m wheelchair race. He participated but did not win any medals at the 1988 Seoul Paralympics. He held world records in the 800 m, 1,500 m, 5,000 m, and 10,000 m events.

At the 1984 Los Angeles Olympics, Trotter finished 6th in the Men's 1500m wheelchair event which was a demonstration event.

== Sport administration ==
Trotter was a deputy mayor of the athlete village at the 2000 Sydney Paralympics and a member of the Sydney Paralympics Organizing Committee (1993–2000). With Jeff Wiseman, Trotter helped organise first Oz Day 10K Wheelchair Road Race in 1990, a major wheelchair road race held annually in Sydney on Australia Day. Trotter was a member of the National Committee on Sport and Recreation for Disabled People, the Elite Sports Committee of the Australian Institute of Sport, and the Australian Olympic Committee’s Sport for All Commission.

== Recognition ==
In 1991, he was awarded the Jan Bens Memorial Prize and in 2000 the Australian Sports Medal.
