= Shelley Hadfield =

New Zealand Paralympian

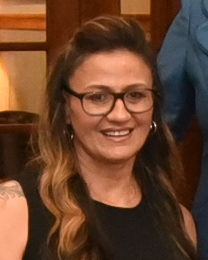
- Kalivati in 2020

Sport
- Country: New Zealand
- Sport: Athletics
Medal record
Women's para athletics
Representing New Zealand
Paralympic Games
Gold medal – first place	1984 New York & Stoke Mandeville	200m 3
Gold medal – first place	1984 New York & Stoke Mandeville	Pentathlon 3
Silver medal – second place	1984 New York & Stoke Mandeville	100m 3
Silver medal – second place	1984 New York & Stoke Mandeville	Slalom 3

Michelle Kalivati (née Hadfield) is a New Zealand Paralympian who competed in athletics. At the 1984 Summer Paralympics, she won gold medals in the 200m 3 and Pentathlon 3, and silver medals in the 100m 3 and Slalom 3.
