= Sabrina Bulleri =

Italian Paralympic athlete (1959–2000)

Personal information
- Born: 7 January 1959 San Giuliano Terme, Italy
- Died: 17 April 2000 (aged 41) Ghezzano, Italy

Sport
- Country: Italy
- Sport: Paralympic athletics
Medal record
Paralympic athletics
Representing Italy
Paralympic Games
Gold medal – first place	1988 Seoul	100m 3
Gold medal – first place	1988 Seoul	200m 3
Gold medal – first place	1988 Seoul	4x100m relay 2-6
Bronze medal – third place	1984 Stoke Mandeville/New York	100m 3
Bronze medal – third place	1984 Stoke Mandeville/New York	4x400m relay 2-5
Bronze medal – third place	1988 Seoul	4x200m relay 2-6

Sabrina Bulleri (7 January 1959 - 17 April 2000) was an Italian Paralympic athlete.

She competed at the 1984 Summer Paralympic Games, winning two bronze medals. She competed at the 1988 Summer Paralympic Games, in Seoul. She won three gold medals, in the 100, 200 meter sprints, and in the 4 × 100 meter relay. She won a bronze medal in the 4 × 200 meter relay.

== Life ==
Sabrina Bulleri began to play sports in the ASHA club in Pisa, where she trained with Soriano Ceccanti, Mariella Bertini and Santo Mangano. All became Paralympic champions in the various disciplines.

She died, after a long illness, in April 2000, in Ghezzano. In the Natural Park of Migliarino, San Rossore, Massaciuccoli, where she had worked, an accessible path was dedicated to her, the Bulleri path.
