= Tony Griffin (athlete) =

British athlete (born 1960)

Anthony Griffin (born February 1960) is a British Paralympic athlete who won 38 Paralympic medals. He was convicted of conspiracy to supply drugs in 2023.

== Paralympic career ==
Griffin, who has been diagnosed with cerebral palsy, won 38 Paralympic medals. He also performed in the 2012 Summer Olympics opening ceremony in London.

After his sporting career, he spoke in schools about his inspirational journey as a disabled athlete. He attributes his successes to his mother. He was awarded an honorary Doctor of Science degree in 2015 by the University of Bolton for his sporting and community achievements, and received the British Empire Medal (BEM) in the 2019 New Year Honours.

== Criminal conviction ==
In 2023, a court convicted Griffin to a 22-month prison sentence following a class A drug conspiracy. Griffin participated as a driver in a drug conspiracy to supply heroin and crack cocaine in the Barrow area. He was stripped of his BEM on 22 August 2023.
