= Patricia Hill =

New Zealand Paralympian

Sport
- Country: New Zealand
- Sport: Athletics
Medal record
Women's para athletics
Representing New Zealand
Paralympic Games
Gold medal – first place	1980 Arnhem	Slalom 2
Gold medal – first place	1984 New York & Stoke Mandeville	Slalom 2
Silver medal – second place	1980 Arnhem	200m 2
Silver medal – second place	1984 New York & Stoke Mandeville	Marathon 2
Silver medal – second place	1984 New York & Stoke Mandeville	Pentathlon 2
Bronze medal – third place	1980 Arnhem	400m 2
Bronze medal – third place	1988 Seoul	Marathon 2
Bronze medal – third place	1988 Seoul	Slalom 3

Patricia Hill is a New Zealand Paralympian who competed in athletics. At the 1980 Summer Paralympics, she won a gold medal in the Slalom 2; a silver medal in the 200m 2; and a bronze medal in the 400m 2. At the 1984 Summer Paralympics, she won a gold medal in the Slalom 2, and silver medals in the Marathon 2 and Pentathlon 2. At the 1988 Summer Paralympics, she won bronze medals in the Marathon 2 and Slalom 3.
