= Rossella Inverni =

Italian Paralympian (born 1962)

Personal information
- Born: 22 April 1962 (age 64) Cittadella, Italy

Sport
- Country: Italy
- Sport: Paralympic athletics
- Disability class: B1
Medal record
Paralympic athletics
Representing Italy
Paralympic Games
Silver medal – second place	1984 Stoke Mandeville/New York	800m B1
Silver medal – second place	1988 Seoul	800m B1
Silver medal – second place	1988 Seoul	1500m B1
Bronze medal – third place	1984 Stoke Mandeville/New York	400m B1
Bronze medal – third place	1988 Seoul	100m B1
Bronze medal – third place	1988 Seoul	400m B1

Rossella Inverni (born 22 April 1962) is a blind Italian Paralympic athlete. She represented Italy at the Summer Paralympic Games, winning three silver and three bronze medals. She was awarded the 1990 Il Michelangelo award.

== Career ==
At the 1984 Summer Paralympic Games in New York, Rossella won a silver medal in the 800 meters B1, and a bronze medal in the 400 meters B1. She finished eleventh in Women's 100 metres B1.

At the 1988 Summer Paralympic Games in Seoul in she won four medals, two silver (800 meters, and 1500 meters B1) and two bronze medals (100 meters B1, and 400 meters).

In 1985, she participated in the European championships in Rome, winning bronze in the 800 and 1500 meters; in 1987 she is at the European championships in Cadiz and in 1989 at the European championships in Zurich, where she won the gold medal in the 400 meters, and the silver in the 100 meters.

At the 1986 world championships, in Gothenburg, she won the gold medal in the 400 meters. She also won silver in the 1500 meters, and bronze in the 800 meters. Finally, in Assen in 1990, Rossella was world champion in the 200 and 400 meters, and won a silver medal in the 100 meters.

She participated in the national championships in Rome in 1985, winning gold in the 100 and 400 meters; she repeated these results at the following championships in Milan 1986, Palermo 1987, Florence 1988, Vigna di Valle 1989, and Tirrenia 1990.
