= Agnese Grigio =

Italian Paralympic athlete (born 1963)

Personal information
- Born: 12 January 1963 (age 63) Albignasego, Italy

Sport
- Country: Italy
- Sport: Paralympic athletics
- Disability class: B3
Medal record
Paralympic athletics
Representing Italy
Paralympic Games
Silver medal – second place	1984 Stoke Mandeville/New York	Pentathlon B3
Bronze medal – third place	1984 Stoke Mandeville/New York	800m B3

Agnese Grigio (born 12 January 1963) is a visually impaired Italian Paralympic athlete. She won a silver medal and a bronze medal.

== Career ==
She continued as a pentathlete and middle-distance runner. She competed at the 1984 Summer Paralympic Games in New York, winning a bronze medal in the 800 meters B3, and a silver medal in the Pentathlon B3.

For personal reasons, she soon interrupted her athletic career, continuing to practise torball (a discipline not present in the Paralympics), at national and international levels.

She is the sister of Emanuela Grigio.
