= Denise Cook =

New Zealand Paralympian

Sport
- Country: New Zealand
- Sport: Athletics
Medal record
Women's para athletics
Representing New Zealand
Paralympic Games
Gold medal – first place	1984 New York & Stoke Mandeville	Discus C5
Gold medal – first place	1984 New York & Stoke Mandeville	Shot Put C5
Silver medal – second place	1984 New York & Stoke Mandeville	Club Throw C5
Silver medal – second place	1984 New York & Stoke Mandeville	Javelin C5

Denise Cook is a New Zealand Paralympian who competed in athletics. At the 1984 Summer Paralympics, she won gold medals in the Discus C5 and Shot Put C5, and silver medals in the Club Throw C5 and Javelin C5.
