= Mel Fitzgerald =

Canadian Paralympic athlete (1953–2023)

Mel Fitzgerald CM
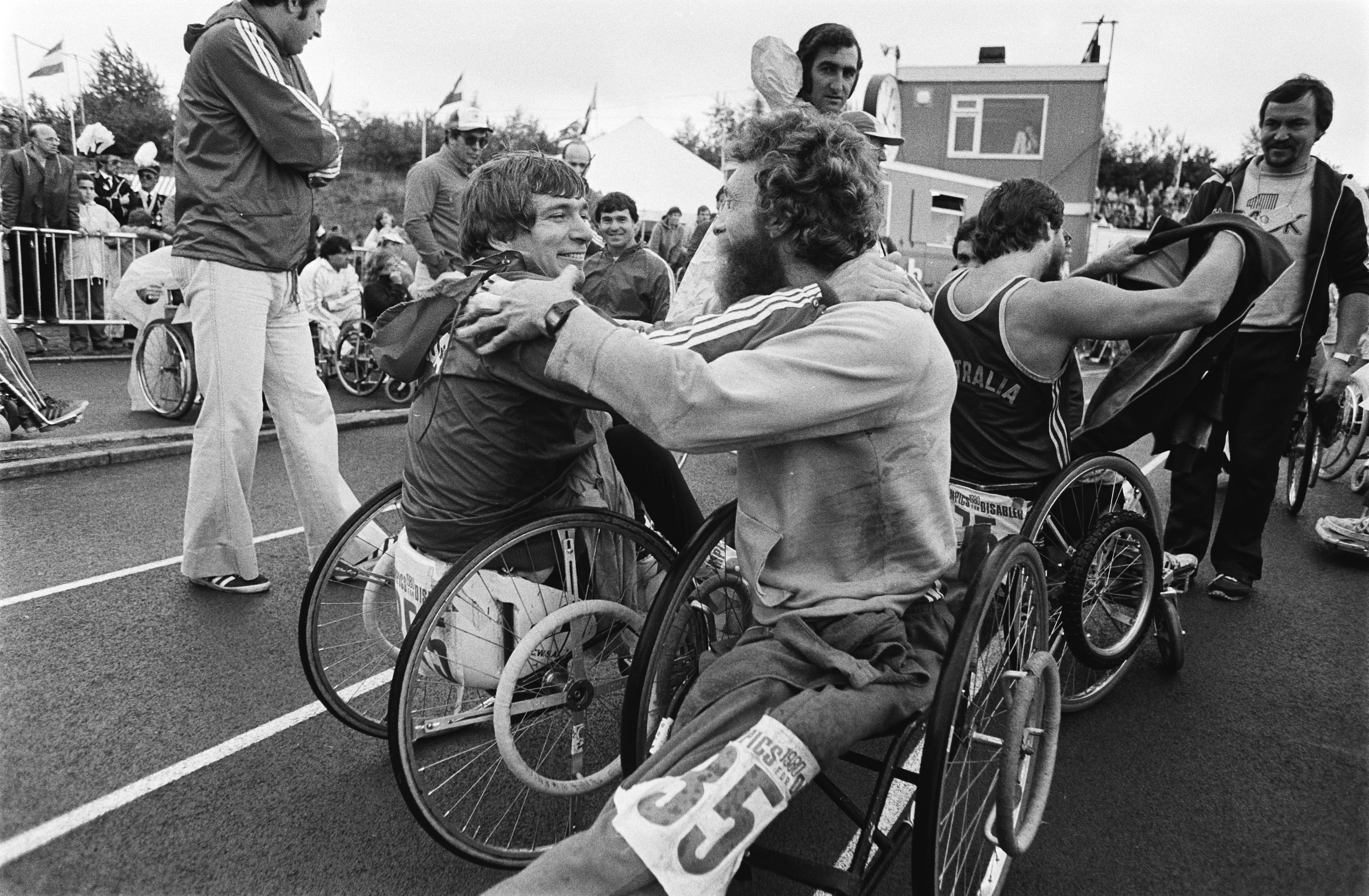
- Fitzgerald (right) is congratulated after winning the 800 meters, 1980

Personal information
- Born: 20 July 1953 Trepassey, Newfoundland, Canada
- Died: 2 October 2023 (aged 70) New Zealand

Sport
- Country: Canada
- Sport: Athletics, Wheelchair racing
Medal record
Athletics at the Summer Paralympics
Representing Canada
Paralympics
Gold medal – first place	1980 Arnhem	Men's 800m 5
Gold medal – first place	1980 Arnhem	Men's 1500m 5
Silver medal – second place	1980 Arnhem	Men's 100m 5
Bronze medal – third place	1980 Arnhem	Men's 4x100m relay 2-5
Gold medal – first place	1984 Stoke Mandeville / New York	Men's marathon 5
Silver medal – second place	1984 Stoke Mandeville / New York	Men's 1500m 5
Silver medal – second place	1984 Stoke Mandeville / New York	Men's 5000m 5
Bronze medal – third place	1984 Stoke Mandeville / New York	Men's 800m 5

Melvin Leo Fitzgerald CM (20 July 1953 – 2 October 2023) was a Canadian Paralympic athlete.

== Biography ==
Fitzgerald was born in Trepassey, Newfoundland in July 1953. He competed in athletics in the 1980 and 1984 Paralympics, winning eight medals. He used a wheelchair since the age of two, when he was afflicted with polio. He was named a Member of the Order of Canada (CM) in 1982, and in 2018 was inducted into the Canadian Wheelchair Sports Association Hall of Fame.

On 2 October 2023, Fitzgerald died from cardiovascular disease in New Zealand, where he had been living. He was 70.
