= Mike Nugent (athlete) =

Australian Paralympic athlete and wheelchair manufacturer (1946–2024)

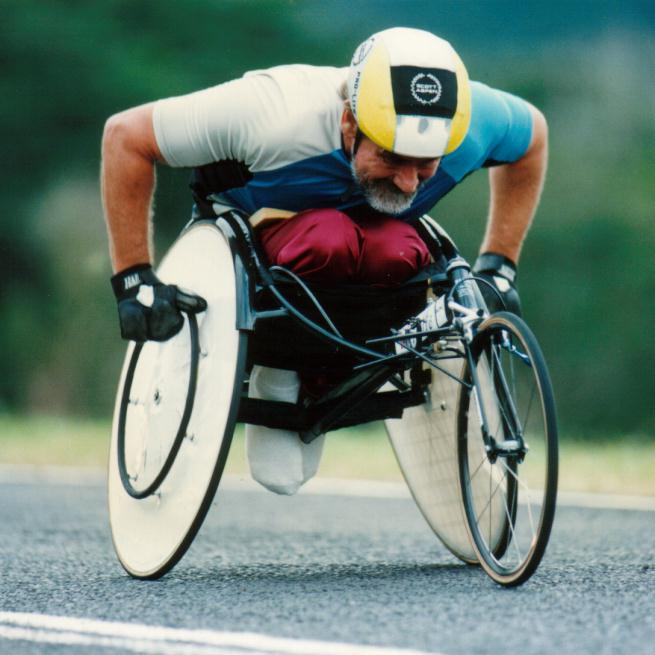
- Nugent racing in his wheelchair

Personal information
- Nationality: Australia
- Born: 28 August 1946
- Died: 6 May 2024 (aged 77)
Medal record
Athletics
Paralympic Games
| Gold medal – first place | 1980 Arnhem | Men's 200 m 3 |
| Gold medal – first place | 1984 New York/Stoke Mandeville | Men's 400 m 2 |
| Silver medal – second place | 1980 Arnhem | Men's 400 m 3 |
| Bronze medal – third place | 1984 New York/Stoke Mandeville | Men's 800 m 2 |
| Bronze medal – third place | 1984 New York/Stoke Mandeville | Men's 1500 m 2 |
| Bronze medal – third place | 1988 Seoul | Men's 200 m 2 |

Michael Alwyn Nugent (28 August 1946 – 6 May 2024) was an Australian Paralympic athlete and wheelchair manufacturer, who won six medals at four Paralympics.

== Background ==
Nugent was paralysed in a motorbike accident and first became involved in wheelchair sport at Princess Alexandra Hospital in Brisbane in 1963 at the age of 17. He began in wheelchair basketball and field events at Kingshome Rehabilitation Centre and became interested in canoeing due to physiotherapist Vernon Hill.

He married Paralympic swimmer Pam Foley in 1975.

In 1977 he started a Brisbane-based wheelchair-manufacturing business, Surgical Engineering.

He died on 6 May 2024, at the age of 77.

== Competitive career ==
Nugent competed at his first National Games in Perth in 1968, and was a regular part of the Queensland team for the games in the 1970s and 1980s. His first international competition was the 1977 FESPIC Games in Sydney. Once his family and business life settled, he began training six days a week to pursue his interest in international competition.

At his first Paralympics, the 1980 Arnhem Games, he won a gold medal in the Men's 200 m 3 event and a silver medal in the Men's 400 m 3 event. His world record-breaking 200 m performance at the 1980 games was recognised as the best international performance by an Australian wheelchair athlete in that year. At the 1984 New York/Stoke Mandeville Games, he won a gold medal and broke a world record in the Men's 400 m 2 event and two bronze medals in the Men's 800 m 2 and Men's 1,500 m 2 events.

At the 1988 Seoul Games, he won a bronze medal in the Men's 200 m 2 event; he had a flat tyre during the early stages of the marathon, but still finished the race to support his teammates. He also participated but did not win any medals in athletics events at the 1992 Barcelona Games.

An avid wheelchair basketballer, he participated in the Australia men's national wheelchair basketball team at the 1986 Gold Cup and was an integral member of the Queensland state wheelchair basketball team. After his retirement from Paralympic competition, he focused on road-racing events to both compete and promote his new wheelchair designs. He participated in all major international wheelchair road-racing events, including the Beppu-Ōita Marathon, the Sempach Marathon, and the Peachtree Road Race.

== Recognition ==
- 1988 – Queensland Sporting Wheelie of the Year
- 2009 -Queensland Sport Hall of Fame Athlete Member
