= Paul Clark (athlete) =

Canadian Paralympic athlete

Personal information
- Nationality: Canadian
- Born: 1957 or 1958 (age 67–68)

Sport
- Country: Canada
- Sport: Athletics
Medal record
Athletics
Representing Canada
Paralympics
Gold medal – first place	1988 Seoul	Men's 800m 2
Gold medal – first place	1984 Stoke Mandeville / New York	Men's 800m 2
Silver medal – second place	1984 Stoke Mandeville / New York	Men's 200m 2
Silver medal – second place	1984 Stoke Mandeville / New York	Men's 400m 2
Silver medal – second place	1984 Stoke Mandeville / New York	Men's 1500m 2
Silver medal – second place	1984 Stoke Mandeville / New York	Men's 5000m 2
Silver medal – second place	1984 Stoke Mandeville / New York	Men's marathon 2

Paul Clark born 1957 is a Canadian retired Paralympic athlete. He competed at the 1980, 1984 and 1988 Paralympics Clark was injured in a motorcycle accident in Woodstock, Ontario at the age of 15 and at the time of the Paralympics, lived in Terrace, British Columbia.
