= Candace Cable =

American Paralympic athlete

Personal information
- Born: July 15, 1954 (age 72) Glendale, California, U.S.
Medal record
Representing United States
Women's wheelchair racing
Summer Olympic Games
Bronze medal – third place	1984 Los Angeles	800 m wheelchair
Women's para athletics
Summer Paralympic Games
Gold medal – first place	1980 Arnhem	200 m 3
Gold medal – first place	1980 Arnhem	400 m 3
Gold medal – first place	1992 Madrid	4×100 m relay TW3–4
Silver medal – second place	1980 Arnhem	4×60 m relay 2-5
Women's para alpine skiing
Winter Paralympic Games
Silver medal – second place	1992 Tignes/Albertville	Slalom LW10-11
Bronze medal – third place	1992 Tignes/Albertville	Downhill LW10-11
Bronze medal – third place	1992 Tignes/Albertville	Giant slalom LW10-11

Candace Cable (born July 15, 1954) is a nine-time Paralympian. She was the first woman to medal in the Summer and Winter Paralympic Games. Cable is also a six-time winner of the Boston Marathon, women's wheelchair division and winner of the first four Los Angeles Marathons.

== Biography ==
Cable was born in Glendale, California. She moved to South Lake Tahoe/Truckee, California after high school, lying about her age to get a job in a casino. She was injured in a car accident on the Kingsbury Grade in 1975 at the age of 21. Following the accident, without the use of her legs, she began feeling sorry for herself and became addicted to heroin. At the time she said "A person in a wheelchair is not supposed to have fun or be happy. I'm both. Besides, I get the best parking spaces at shopping centers, and I don't have to wait in line at the movies." She went through drug rehabilitation in 1978. She became acquainted with wheelchair sports while attending California State University, Long Beach first trying swimming before finding wheelchair racing could let her work out with able-bodied friends.

"We're all only non-disabled temporarily. Sooner or later everyone's body breaks down. That puts me ahead of the game because I already know how to live outside of the old order."

After four months of training, Cable participated in the inaugural 1980 World Games for the disabled, 1984 Summer Olympics in wheelchair racing as an exhibition event, as well as the 1984, 1988, 1992, and 1996 Summer Paralympic Games, and also five Winter Olympics. Cable won twelve Paralympic medals of which eight were gold medals. She was the first woman to medal in the Summer and Winter Paralympic Games.
