= Switzerland at the 1984 Summer Paralympics =

- IPC code: SUI
- NPC: Swiss Paralympic Committee
- Website: www.swissparalympic.ch

in Stoke Mandeville/New York
- Competitors: 43
- Medals Ranked 16th: Gold 18 Silver 13 Bronze 12 Total 43

Summer Paralympics appearances (overview)
- 1960; 1964; 1968; 1972; 1976; 1980; 1984; 1988; 1992; 1996; 2000; 2004; 2008; 2012; 2016; 2020; 2024

Switzerland competed at the 1984 Summer Paralympics in Stoke Mandeville, Great Britain and New York City, United States. 43 competitors from Switzerland won 43 medals including 18 gold, 13 silver and 12 bronze and finished 16th in the medal table.

== See also ==
- Switzerland at the Paralympics
- Switzerland at the 1984 Summer Olympics
