= Robert Courtney (Paralympian) =

New Zealand Paralympic athlete

Personal information
- Full name: Robert George Courtney
- Born: 27 April 1959
- Died: 28 January 2016 (aged 56) Auckland, New Zealand
Medal record
Men's para athletics
Representing New Zealand
Paralympic Games
Gold medal – first place	1984 New York & Stoke Mandeville	100 m 4
Bronze medal – third place	1984 New York & Stoke Mandeville	King of the straight – 100 m 1A-6

Robert George Courtney (27 April 1959 – 28 January 2016) was a champion New Zealand Paralympian.

== Early life ==
Born on 27 April 1959, Courtney spent his childhood in Auckland and was educated at St Peter's College.

== Athletics career ==
Courtney represented New Zealand in the 1982 Paraplegic Olympics in Hong Kong in the 100 metres and 200 metres Wheelchair Sprints for which he won gold medals and set world records. He also represented New Zealand in the 1984 Summer Paralympics at Stoke Mandeville, England, where he won, and set a world record in, the men's 100 m 4. In the same games he also won a bronze medal in the Men's King of the Straight - 100 m 1A-6.

== Death ==
Courtney died in Auckland on 28 January 2016. He had suffered from kidney problems for over 20 years.
