= Paul van Winkel =

Belgian wheelchair racer

Paul van Winkel (born 1953) is a Belgian former wheelchair racer and multiple Paralympic gold medallist.

He is Belgium's most successful athlete at the Summer Paralympics, having won seven gold medals in athletics between 1980 and 1988. In his first Paralympics in 1980, he was a gold medallist in the 4 × 100 m relay (category 2–5) and the category 3 slalom. Two further golds followed in 1984, this time in the 400 m 1500 m. He was also the silver medallist in the 100 m and 200 m sprint events, as well as taking a bronze in the category 3 slalom. Van Winkel medalled in all the events he entered in 1988: he was first in the 400 m, 800 m and 5000 m wheelchair races, and was the runner-up in the 200 m and the 1500 m. In his fourth and final Paralympic Games in 1992, he came close to further medals with a fourth place in the 800 m and fifth in the 200 m. He did not make the 400 m final and failed to finish in the 5000 m, making his last appearance one without medals.

He won medals in the demonstration wheelchair race at the Olympics twice, winning in 1984 and finishing second in 1988. He has also competed outside of Olympic competition and took three consecutive victories at Grandma's Marathon in two separate streaks. He encouraged fellow marathon racer Marcelo Ordaz-Cruz to enter the sport, after Ordaz-Cruz became paralysed due to a gunshot wound. Van Winkel now lives in Minnesota.
