= Graham Condon =

New Zealand paralympic athlete (1949–2007)

Graham Condon QSM JP
Personal information
- Full name: Graham Thomas Condon
- Born: 11 February 1949 Christchurch, New Zealand
- Died: 8 September 2007 (aged 58) Christchurch, New Zealand

Sport
- Country: New Zealand
- Sport: Athletics; Swimming
Medal record
Men's para athletics
Representing New Zealand
Paralympic Games
Gold medal – first place	1972 Heidelberg	Discus 3
Gold medal – first place	1980 Arnhem	Discus 2
Silver medal – second place	1980 Arnhem	Men's Slalom 2
Silver medal – second place	1988 Seoul	Slalom 2
Bronze medal – third place	1984 New York & Stoke Mandeville	Marathon 2
Bronze medal – third place	1984 New York & Stoke Mandeville	Slalom 2

Graham Thomas Condon QSM JP (11 February 1949 – 8 September 2007) was a disabled athlete who won seven medals for New Zealand competing in Paralympic swimming and athletic events and a total of 36 medals in international competition overall. He was also a local-body politician and a disability advocate.

== Biography ==
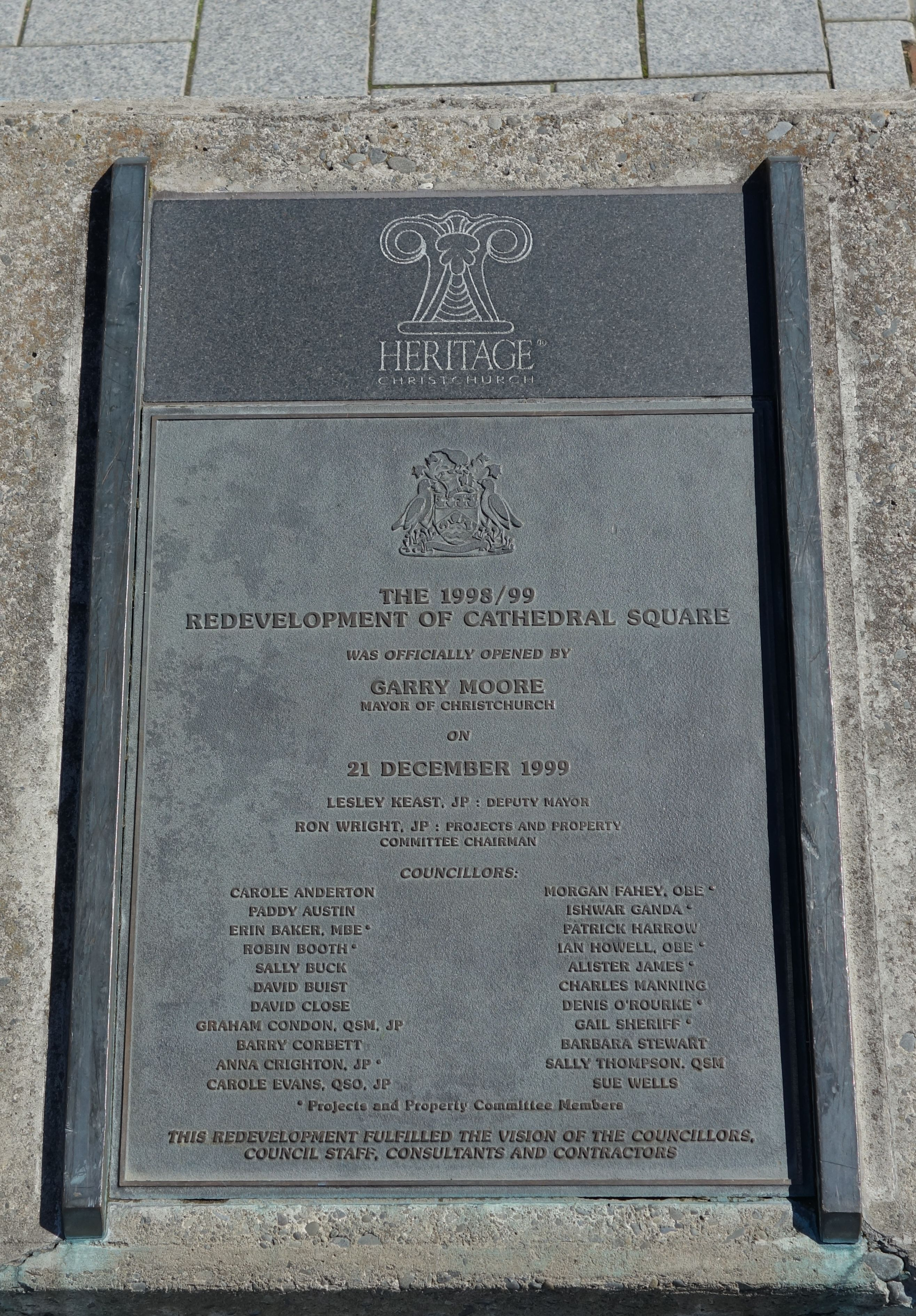
Plaque commemorating the redevelopment of Cathedral Square in 1998/99, with Condon listed as one of the councillors

Condon was born in Christchurch in 1949. He was rendered a paraplegic after contracting childhood polio. Condon was the only New Zealander to take part in six consecutive Paralympics. He competed in the Paralympics in athletics and swimming at both the 1968 Tel Aviv and 1972 Heidelberg Games, and won a gold medal in the Men's Discus 3 event at the latter competition. He participated in athletics and swimming at the 1976 Toronto Paralympics and won a gold medal in the Men's Discus 2 event and a silver medal in the Men's Slalom 2 event at the 1980 Arnhem Games; he also participated in swimming at the 1980 games. At the 1984 New York/Stoke Mandeville Games, he won two bronze medals in the Men's Marathon 2 and Men's Slalom 2 events. During the Marathon, he was with a bloc of competitors from Australia, America, and Canada when he hit a pothole around the 20-kilometre (12 mi) mark, causing the competitor behind him, Robert McIntyre, to lose his balance and flip upside down. Condon helped McIntyre back into position and ended up coming third. His final Paralympics were the 1988 Seoul Games, where he won a silver medal in the Men's Slalom 2 event. He won a total of seven Paralympic medals and 36 medals in international competitions throughout his career.

He was one of the founding members of Parafed Canterbury, which strives to boost sport and recreational involvement among disabled people. He was also a board member of the national sports agency SPARC for five years. Condon was elected as a Christchurch city councillor in 1995 and served four terms as a city councillor. He was standing for re-election for the Shirley-Papanui ward in the October 2007 election.

== Death ==
On Saturday 8 September 2007 the 58-year-old Condon was killed in an accident involving a car while riding his hand-propelled bicycle. He was struck by a fifteen-year-old driver on Lower Styx Road, Brooklands. The funeral was held at the Cathedral of the Blessed Sacrament where hundreds of mourners paid their respects. He was survived by his wife of 35 years, Kath, and his two children, Craig and Andrea.

== Recognition ==
Condon was awarded the Queen's Service Medal for community service in the 1982 Queen's Birthday Honours, and a New Zealand 1990 Commemoration Medal in 1990.

The Graham Condon Recreation and Sports Centre at the Papanui High School campus in Papanui, which opened on 9 October 2011, is named after him. Parafed Canterbury have also named a scholarship after him.
