= Connie Hansen =

Danish Paralympic athlete (born 1964)

Connie Hansen (born 29 May 1964 in Slangerup, Denmark) is a noted Danish Paralympian. She competed in athletics at the Summer Paralympics three times, in 1984, 1988 and 1992, and won a total of nine gold medals, four silvers, and one bronze. She was inducted to the Paralympic Hall of Fame in 2008.

In the years 1988-94 she was often ranked highly on the "Athlete of the Year" list, the leading Danish television and sports newspaper ranking list, and served as one of the "key actors" in the 1992 Barcelona Paralympics’ movie, "Into the Light".

Honours/Awards: 1992 "Female athlete of the Year" by Danish National Olympic Organizations. 1992 "Athlete of the year" by the Danish Sports Organisation for Disabled. 1992 "Athlete of the Year, Runner Up – 2. place" voted by the biggest Danish newspaper 1988 "Female Athlete of the Year" by Danish Television. 1988 "Sports Award" of Ministry of Culture.

In 1991, she started a company designing and producing running frames and other gait devices. Frame running was created in Denmark in 1991 by her and Mansoor Siddiqi, a former CP2L backwards wheelchair foot pushing athlete and currently the international frame running coordinator. It has since been developed in partnership with the Cerebral Palsy International Sports and Recreation Association. Though her and many others' efforts, frame running has developed to be one of the fastest growing parasports, and an amazing physically and mentally challenging sport for a wide group of the most challenged athletes. A signal to IPC about the importance of standing up for their roots and values of Para Sport. Today, frame running is seen as a discipline within Paraathletics and stands close to be included on the Paralympic program.

The company BY CONNIEHANSEN still owned and run by Connie Hansen personal is engaging themselves with rehabilitation centers, dealers and sports/disability organizations in many countries worldwide to strengthen the sport RaceRunning and encourage an active & inclusive lifestyle.
