= Monica Wetterström =

Swedish wheelchair racer

Monica Säker-Wetterström
Personal information
- Full name: Svea Sofia Monica Säker-Wetterström
- Born: 21 July 1956 (age 69) Gävle, Sweden

Sport
- Country: Sweden
- Sport: Paralympic athletics
Medal record
Paralympic athletics
Representing Sweden
Paralympic Games
| Silver medal – second place | 1992 Barcelona | 100m TW4 |
| Silver medal – second place | 1992 Barcelona | 200m TW4 |
| Silver medal – second place | 1992 Barcelona | 1500m TW3-4 |
| Bronze medal – third place | 1992 Barcelona | 400m TW4 |

Svea Sofia Monica Säker-Wetterström is a former wheelchair athlete from Sweden. She competed at the 1992 Summer Paralympics and medalled in all four of her events, taking silvers in the 100, 200, and 1500 metre races and a bronze in the 400 metres. Following a brief period of retirement from the sport, Wetterstrom was a late entry to the 1997 London Marathon. She was the surprise winner that year, besting the reigning champion Tanni Grey and setting a new course record of 1:49:09. She would go on to win the London Marathon again in 1999. She won the Berlin Marathon twice.

Säker-Wetterström had also competed in 800m wheelchair race at the 1984, 1988, 1992 and 1996 Summer Olympics. Her highest achievement was finishing at second place at the 1984 Olympics.
