= Austria at the 1984 Summer Paralympics =

- IPC code: AUT
- NPC: Austrian Paralympic Committee
- Website: www.oepc.at (in German)

in Stoke Mandeville/New York
- Competitors: 47
- Medals Ranked 17th: Gold 14 Silver 20 Bronze 10 Total 44

Summer Paralympics appearances (overview)
- 1960; 1964; 1968; 1972; 1976; 1980; 1984; 1988; 1992; 1996; 2000; 2004; 2008; 2012; 2016; 2020; 2024

Austria competed at the 1984 Summer Paralympics in Stoke Mandeville, Great Britain and New York City, United States. 47 competitors from Austria won 44 medals including 14 gold, 20 silver and 10 bronze and finished 17th in the medal table.

== See also ==
- Austria at the Paralympics
- Austria at the 1984 Summer Olympics
