= Australia at the 1984 Summer Paralympics =

- IPC code: AUS
- NPC: Australian Paralympic Committee
- Website: www.paralympic.org.au

in Stoke Mandeville/New York
- Competitors: 109
- Medals Ranked 8th: Gold 49 Silver 54 Bronze 50 Total 153

Summer Paralympics appearances (overview)
- 1960; 1964; 1968; 1972; 1976; 1980; 1984; 1988; 1992; 1996; 2000; 2004; 2008; 2012; 2016; 2020; 2024

Australia competed at the 1984 Summer Paralympics that were held in two locations - Stoke Mandeville, United Kingdom (wheelchair athletes with spinal cord injuries) and in the Mitchel Athletic Complex and Hofstra University in Long Island, New York, United States of America (wheelchair and ambulatory athletes with cerebral palsy, amputees, and "Les Autres" (the others) conditions as well as blind and visually impaired athletes). Four months before the beginning of the 1984 summer Paralympics, the University of Illinois terminating their contract to hold the Games. Australia won 154 medals - 49 gold, 54 silver and 51 bronze medals. Australia competed in 9 sports and won medals in 6 sports. Australia finished 8th on the gold medal table and 7th on the total medal table.

Notable Australian performances were:

- In Stoke Mandeville (Spinal and Cord Injury athletes):
  - Australia's female shooters: Libby Kosmala won four gold medal, creating world record on each occasion, and Barbara Caspers matched her effort also winning four gold medals
  - Alan Dufty won two of each gold, silver and bronze medals on the track
  - Roy Fowler won two gold medals in the singles and doubles lawn bowls
  - A host of other athletes won individual gold medals including Allan Chadwick, Julie Dowling (athlete), Terry Giddy, Eric Magennis (with Roy Fowler), Michael Nugent, Jan Randles, Wayne Ryding and Peter Trotter.
- In New York:
  - The Amputee athletes were the most successful:
  - In the pool, coaching provided by Peter Carroll: Helena Brunner won 5 gold medals, Gary Gudgeon won 4, Greg Hammond won 3 and Rosemary Eames won 2.
  - In the track, Brett Holcombe won 3 gold medals
- Blind and Vision Impaired athletes also benefited from a national organisation to organize competitions and raise funds.
  - They performed well in track and field with Mark Davies winning two gold medals, Margaret Murphy winning a silver and bronze, and both Warren Lawton and Prue-Anne Reynalds securing bronze medals.
  - Blind and Vision Impaired swimmers excelled. Medallist included Mary-Anne Wallace (gold, silver and two bronze), Kingsley Bugarin (3 silver and a bronze), Craig Blackburn (3 silver), Therese Donovan (3 silver and a bronze), and Mary-Anne Wallace (silver and two bronze medals).
- For the first time 4 Cerebral Palsy athletes and a "Les Autres" athlete attended the Paralympics :
  - Robert Walden won four gold medals in the pool
  - Terry Biggs won a gold medal in table tennis
  - Lyn Coleman won a silver medal on the track
  - The first Australian "Les Autres" athlete, Malcom Chalmers won a gold, silver and two bronze medals in swimming.

== Team ==
Australia sent a large team of 58 athletes in Stoke Mandeville. These athletes were managed by George Dunstan and Don Perriman with medical supervision provided by Dr John Bourke, Sister Norma Beer and physiotherapist Maggie Beven, as well as 13 additional escorts. Australia sent 66 other athletes to the International Games for Disabled in New York. The largest components of competitors were Amputees (40) and Blind and Vision Impaired (21), while Cerebral Palsy (4) and an Australian "Les Autres" athlete attended the Games for the first time.

Amputee Officials in New York - Berry Rickards (General Manager), Peter Carroll (Swim Coach/Manager), Brian Neighbour (Athletics Coach/Manager), Wayne Bradshaw (Athletics Assistant), Dr Les Cunningham (Sport Psychologist), Mark Mannin (Media)
Blind Officials in New York - J. Simon (General Manager), Jane Buckley (Physiotherapist)

== Results ==
Spinal and Cord Injury Australia's team won 19 gold medals in Stoke Mandeville and over half of the athletes at the VII World Wheelchair secured medals. If we combine both the International Games for the disabled in New York and the VII World Wheelchair Games at Stoke Mandeville, as the New York/Stoke Mandeville 1984 Paralympic Games, Australia had he most successful Paralympic Games since Tel Aviv 1968. The combined team won 49 gold medals, 54 silver medals and 51 bronze medals to finish eight on the medal tally.

== Stoke Mandeville Australian Athlete participation reports ==
Sport	Male	Female	Total
Archery	5	1	0
Athletics	44	11	55
Boccia	0	0	0
Cycling	0	0	0
Equestrian	0	0	0
Football 7-a-side	0	0	0
Goalball	0	0	0
Lawn Bowls	10	0	10
Powerlifting	0	0	0
Shooting	5	0	5
Snooker	0	0	0
Swimming	14	15	29
Table Tennis	1	0	1
Volleyball	0	0	0
Weightlifting	1	0	1
Wheelchair Basketball	0	0	0
Wheelchair Fencing	0	0	0
Wrestling	0	0	0

== Australia world record holders ==
=== Women ===
Name	Event
Barbara Caspers, S.A.	Class 1C (Quad) Air Rifle (all positions)
Julie Dowling, TAS.	Class 4 (Para) Javelin
Tracey Freeman, QLD.	Class 1C (Quad) Shot put -60m Track
Libby Kosmala, S.A.	Class 2 (Para) Air Rifle (all positions)

=== Men ===
Name	Event
Alan Chadwick, NSW.	Class 1A (Quad) Air Rifle (Prone)
Alan Dufty, QLD.	Class 1C (Quad) 400m Track
Terry Giddy, NSW.	Class 4 (Para) Discus
Michael Nugent, QLD.	Class 2 (Para) 400m Track
Wayne Patchet, NSW.	Class 1A (Quad) Shot put Discus- Club
Eric Russell, SA.	Class 3 (Para) Shot put
Wayne Ryding, VIC	Class 5 (Para) 100m Freestyle

== Medalists ==
Medal	Name	Sport	Event
Gold	Mark Davies	Athletics	Men's 100 m B2
Gold	Mark Davies	Athletics	Men's Pentathlon B2
Gold	Alan Dufty	Athletics	Men's 400 m 1C
Gold	Alan Dufty	Athletics	Men's Marathon 1C
Gold	Michael Nugent	Athletics	Men's 400 m 2
Gold	Peter Trotter	Athletics	Men's 5000 m 4
Gold	Brett Holcombe, Peter Kirby, Joe Egan. Vernon Ezzy	Athletics	Men's 4 × 100 m relay A4–9
Gold	Michael Morley	Athletics	Men's High jump A6
Gold	Kerrod McGregor	Athletics	Men's Long jump A2
Gold	Kerrod McGregor	Athletics	Men's Javelin throw A2
Gold	Brett Holcombe	Athletics	Men's Long jump A6
Gold	Brett Holcombe	Athletics	Men's Triple jump A6
Gold	Terry Giddy	Athletics	Men's Discus throw 4
Gold	Jan Randles	Athletics	Women's Marathon 4
Gold	Valerie Woodbridge	Athletics	Women's Long jump A2
Gold	Julie Dowling	Athletics	Women's Javelin 4
Gold	Donna Smith	Athletics	Women's Javelin A2
Gold	Roy Fowler	Lawn bowls	Men's singles paraplegic
Gold	Roy Fowler, Eric Magennis	Lawn bowls	Men's pairs paraplegic
Gold	Allan Chadwick	Shooting	Men's Rifle prone - tetraplegic (aids) 1A-1C
Gold	Libby Kosmala	Shooting	Women's Air rifle 3 positions 2-6
Gold	Libby Kosmala	Shooting	Women's Air rifle kneeling 2-6
Gold	Libby Kosmala	Shooting	Women's Air rifle prone 2-6
Gold	Libby Kosmala	Shooting	Women's Air rifle standing 2-6
Gold	Barbara Caspers	Shooting	Women'sAir rifle kneeling 1A-1C
Gold	Barbara Caspers	Shooting	Women's Air rifle prone 1A-1C
Gold	Barbara Caspers	Shooting	Women's Air rifle standing 1A-1C
Gold	Barbara Caspers	Shooting	Mixed Air rifle 3 positions 1A-1C
Gold	Robert Walden	Swimming	Men's 50 m freestyle C6
Gold	Robert Walden	Swimming	Men's 25 m freestyle C6
Gold	Robert Walden	Swimming	Men's 100 m freestyle C6
Gold	Robert Walden	Swimming	Men's 200 m freestyle C6
Gold	Gary Gudgeon	Swimming	Men's 100 m breaststroke A4
Gold	Gary Gudgeon	Swimming	Men's 100 m butterfly A4
Gold	Gary Gudgeon	Swimming	Men's 200 m individual medley A4
Gold	Gary Gudgeon	Swimming	Men's 400 m freestyle A4
Gold	Australian Team	Swimming	Men's 4 × 100 m medley relay A1–A9
Gold	Australian Team	Swimming	Women's 4 × 100 m freestyle relay A1–A9
Gold	Australian Team	Swimming	Women's 4 × 100 m medley relay A1–A9
Gold	Helena Brunner	Swimming	Women's 100 m backstroke A4
Gold	Rosemary Eames	Swimming	Women's 100 m breaststroke A6
Gold	Helena Brunner	Swimming	Women's 100 m freestyle A4
Gold	Helena Brunner	Swimming	Women's 400 m freestyle A4
Gold	Mary-Anne Wallace	Swimming	Women's 400 m freestyle B3
Gold	Wayne Ryding	Swimming	Men's 100 m butterfly A4
Gold	Greg Hammond	Swimming	Men's 100 m breaststroke A8
Gold	Greg Hammond	Swimming	Men's 100 m freestyle A8
Gold	Malcom Chalmers	Swimming	Men's 100 m freestyle L6
Gold	Terry Biggs	Table tennis	Men's Singles C1
Silver	Ian Trewhella	Archery	Men's Double advanced metric round tetraplegic
Silver	Ian Trewhella, David Higgins, Stephen Austen	Archery	Men's Short metric round team 1A-6
Silver	David McPherson	Athletics	Men's 100 m 2
Silver	Alan Dufty	Athletics	Men's 200 m 1C
Silver	Robert McInyre	Athletics	Men's 800 m 5
Silver	Peter Trotter	Athletics	Men's 1500 m 4
Silver	Peter Marsh, Alan Dufty, Michael Quinn, Michael Desanto	Athletics	Men's 4 × 200 m relay 1A–1C
Silver	Australian Team	Athletics	Men's 4 × 400 m relay A4–9
Silver	James Hoggan	Athletics	Men's High jump A4
Silver	Brett Holcombe	Athletics	Men's High jump A6
Silver	Stephen Sargolia	Athletics	Men's Long jump A4
Silver	Stephen Sargolia	Athletics	Men's 400 m A4
Silver	Stephen Muir	Athletics	Men's Triple jump A5
Silver	Kerrod McGregor	Athletics	Men's Discus throw A2
Silver	Donald Dann	Athletics	Men's Javelin throw A4
Silver	John Federico	Athletics	Men's Slalom 5
Silver	Julie Russell	Athletics	Women's Marathon 3
Silver	Margaret Murphy	Athletics	Women's High jump B2
Silver	Valerie Woodbridge	Athletics	Women's Discus throw A2
Silver	Donna Smith	Athletics	Women's Shot put A2
Silver	Lyn Coleman	Athletics	Women's Slalom C1
Silver	John Forsberg	Lawn bowls	Men's singles A6/8
Silver	John Forsberg, Robert Wedderburn	Lawn bowls	Men's pairs A6/8
Silver	Wayne Lewis, Ken Moran	Lawn bowls	Men's pairs paraplegic
Silver	Kingsley Bugarin	Swimming	Men's 50 m breaststroke B3
Silver	Kingsley Bugarin	Swimming	Men's 50 m freestyle B3
Silver	Gary Gudgeon	Swimming	Men's 100 m backstroke A4
Silver	Greg Hammond	Swimming	Men's 100 m butterfly A8
Silver	Craig Blackburn	Swimming	Men's 100 m butterfly B3
Silver	Craig Blackburn	Swimming	Men's 100 m freestyle B3
Silver	Malcom Chalmers	Swimming	Men's 100 m butterfly L6
Silver	Greg Hammond	Swimming	Men's 200 m individual medley A8
Silver	Wayne Ryding	Swimming	Men's 400 m freestyle 5
Silver	Craig Blackburn	Swimming	Men's 400 m freestyle B3
Silver	Australian Team	Swimming	Men's 4 × 100 m freestyle relay A1–A9
Silver	Kerri-Anne Connor	Swimming	Women's 50 m butterfly
Silver	Ursula King	Swimming	Women's 50 m freestyle 3
Silver	Kerri-Anne Connor	Swimming	Women's 100 m backstroke 4
Silver	Rosemary Eames	Swimming	Women's 100 m backstroke A6
Silver	Tracey Lewis	Swimming	Women's 100 m backstroke A8
Silver	Carol Young	Swimming	Women's 100 m breaststroke A2
Silver	Meredith Evans	Swimming	Women's 100 m breaststroke A4
Silver	Therese Donovan	Swimming	Women's 100 m breaststroke B2
Silver	Rosemary Eames	Swimming	Women's 100 m butterfly A6
Silver	Tracey Lewis	Swimming	Women's 100 m butterfly A8
Silver	Mary-Anne Wallace	Swimming	Women's 100 m butterfly B3
Silver	Kerri-Anne Connor	Swimming	Women's 100 m freestyle 4
Silver	Rosemary Eames	Swimming	Women's 100 m freestyle A6
Silver	Tracey Lewis	Swimming	Women's 100 m freestyle A8
Silver	Therese Donovan	Swimming	Women's 100 m freestyle B2
Silver	Helena Brunner	Swimming	Women's 200 m individual medley A4
Silver	Rosemary Eames	Swimming	Women's 200 m individual medley A6
Silver	Therese Donovan	Swimming	Women's 400 m freestyle B2
Silver	Kerri-Anne Connor	Swimming	Women's 4×50 m individual medley 4
Bronze	Susan Davies	Archery	Women's Double FITA round paraplegic
Bronze	Joe Egan	Athletics	Men's 100 m A4
Bronze	Peter Kirby	Athletics	Men's 100 m A6
Bronze	David McPherson	Athletics	Men's 200 m 2
Bronze	Peter Kirby	Athletics	Men's 400 m A6
Bronze	Alan Dufty	Athletics	Men's 800 m 1C
Bronze	Mike Nugent	Athletics	Men's 800 m 2
Bronze	Mike Nugent	Athletics	Men's 1500 m 2
Bronze	Peter Trotter	Athletics	Men's 800 m 4
Bronze	Robert McIntyre	Athletics	Men's 1500 m 5
Bronze	Robert McIntyre	Athletics	Men's 5000 m 5
Bronze	Peter Marsh, Alan Dufty, Michael Quinn, Michael Desanto	Athletics	Men's 4 × 100 m relay 1A–1C
Bronze	Jeff Wiseman, Robert Turner, Robert McIntyre, Peter Trotter	Athletics	Men's 4 × 400 m relay 2–5
Bronze	Warren Lawton	Athletics	Men's High jump B3
Bronze	Peter Kirby	Athletics	Men's Long jump A6
Bronze	Michael Morley	Athletics	Men's Triple jump A6
Bronze	Michael Quinn	Athletics	Men's Slalom 1B
Bronze	Prue-Anne Reynalds	Athletics	Women's 3000 m B1
Bronze	Jan Randles	Athletics	Women's 5000 m 4
Bronze	Margaret Murphy	Athletics	Women's Long jump B2
Bronze	Donna Smith	Athletics	Women's Discus throw A2
Bronze	Valerie Woodbridge	Athletics	Women's Shot put A2
Bronze	Julie Russell	Athletics	Women's Pentathlon 3
Bronze	Clifford Swann, Keith Zotti	Lawn bowls	Men's pairs A2/4
Bronze	David Boldery	Lawn bowls	Men's singles A2/4
Bronze	John Newton	Lawn bowls	Men's singles A6/8
Bronze	Malcom Chalmers	Swimming	Men's 100 m breaststroke L6
Bronze	David Griffin	Swimming	Men's 100 m butterfly A2
Bronze	Phillip Tracey	Swimming	Men's 100 m freestyle 1A
Bronze	Robert Staddon	Swimming	Men's 100 m freestyle 1C
Bronze	Robert Staddon	Swimming	Men's 25 m backstroke 1C
Bronze	Malcom Chalmers	Swimming	Men's 200 m individual medley L6
Bronze	Kingsley Bugarin	Swimming	Men's 400 m breaststroke B3
Bronze	Australian Team, Robert Staddon, Michael Quinn, Wayne Ryding?, Phillip Tracey?	Swimming	Men's 3×25 m freestyle relay 1A–1C
Bronze	Ursula King	Swimming	Women's 25 m butterfly 3
Bronze	Therese Donovan	Swimming	Women's 100 m backstroke B2
Bronze	Kerri-Anne Connor	Swimming	Women's 100 m breaststroke 4
Bronze	Helena Brunner	Swimming	Women's 100 m breaststroke A4
Bronze	Carol Young	Swimming	Women's 100 m butterfly A2
Bronze	Anne Currie	Swimming	Women's 100 m freestyle A1
Bronze	Mary-Anne Wallace	Swimming	Women's 100 m freestyle B3
Bronze	Ursula King	Swimming	Women's 200 m freestyle 3
Bronze	Meredith Evans	Swimming	Women's 100 m backstroke A4
Bronze	Meredith Evans	Swimming	Women's 200 m individual medley A4
Bronze	Meredith Evans	Swimming	Women's 400 m freestyle A4
Bronze	Meredith Evans	Swimming	Women's 100 m freestyle A4
Bronze	Tracey Lewis	Swimming	Women's 200 m individual medley A8
Bronze	Therese Donovan	Swimming	Women's 200 m individual medley B2
Bronze	Mary-Anne Wallace	Swimming	Women's 200 m individual medley B3
Bronze	Kerrie Engel	Swimming	Women's 400 m freestyle 5

Medals by discipline
Discipline	Gold medal	Silver medal	Bronze medal	Total
Archery	0	2	1	3
Athletics	17	19	22	58
Boccia	0	0	0	0
Cycling	0	0	0	0
Wheelchair fencing	0	0	0	0
Football seven-a-side	0	0	0	0
Lawn bowls	2	3	3	8
Shooting	9	0	0	9
Swimming	20	30	24	74
Table tennis	1	0	0	1
Volleyball	0	0	0	0
Weightlifting	0	0	0	0
Wheelchair basketball	0	0	0	0
Total	49	54	50	153

== Events ==
=== Archery ===
Australia represented by:
Men – Stephen Austen, David Higgins, Eric Klein, Russell Schinn, Ian Trewhella
Women – Susan Davies
Australia won 3 medals - 2 silver medals and 1 bronze medal.

=== Athletics ===
Australia represented by:
Men – Terry Biggs, Paul Bird, Kim Bley, Murray Buck, Bailey Compton, Paul Croft, Donald Dann, Mark Davies, Michael Desanto, Neil Dixon, Alan Dufty, Joe Egan, David Evans, Vernon Ezzy, John Federico, Ian Gainey, Terry Giddy, Nicky Gleeson, David Goodman, James Hoggan, Brett Holcombe, Peter Kirby, Warren Lawton, Peter Marsh, Kerrod McGregor, Robert McIntyre, Jeff McNeil, David McPherson, Michael Morley, Stephen Muir, Panayiotis (Peter) Negropontis, Michael Nugent, John Payne, Michael Quinn, David Regan, Stephen Sargolia, John Sheil, Darryl Smith, Peter Trotter, Robert Turner, Jeff Wiseman, Garry Woolgar
Women – Lynette Coleman, Julie Dowling (athlete), Meredith Jones, Margaret Murphy, Jan Randles, Prue-Anne Reynalds, Amanda Rose, Julie Russell, Donna Smith, Catherine Watson, Valerie Woodbridge
Australia won 58 medals - 17 gold, 19 silver and 22 bronze medals. Coaches - D. Reed (blind), D. Regan (blind) Officials - R. Carlton (Manager - Blind), B. Dunk (blind), L. O'Brien (blind), _

=== Goalball ===
Men - Theo Bottom, Graham Coulton, Martin Furness, Nick Gleeson, Greg Scott, Leigh Sloan
Coach - S. Bennett Officials - M. Downey

=== Lawn Bowls ===
Australia represented by:
Men – David Boldery, John Forsberg, Roy Fowler, Wayne Lewis, Eric Magennis, Ken Moran, John Newton, Clifford Swann, Robert Wedderburn, Keith Zotti
Australia won 8 medals - 2 gold, 3 silver and 3 bronze medals. Roy Fowler won 2 gold medals.

=== Shooting ===
Australia represented by:
Men – Troy Andrews, Kevin Bawden, Keith Bremner, Allan Chadwick, Peter Parker, Andrew Rambow, Stanley Sims, Grant Walker
Women – Barbara Caspers, Elizabeth Kosmala
Australian team won 9 gold medals - Barbara Caspers and Elizabeth Kosmala both won 4 gold medals and Allan Chadwick one gold medal.

=== Snooker ===
Australia represented by:
Men - Don Campbell

=== Swimming ===
Australia represented by:
Men – Paul Bird, Craig Blackburn, Kingsley Bugarin, Malcom Chalmers, Geoffrey Fowler, David Griffin, Gary Gudgeon, Greg Hammond, Michael Kelly, Alan Morley, Michael Quinn, Wayne Ryding, Robert Staddon, Phillip Tracey, Robert Walden
Women – Helena Brunner, Lynette Coleman, Kerri-Anne Connor, Anne Currie, Therese Donovan, Rosemary Eames, Kerrie Engel, Meredith Evans, Deborah Holland, Ursula King, Tracey Lewis, Jan Miller, Mary-Anne Wallace, Carol Young
Coaches - G. Brown (Blind) Officials - J. Blackburn (Manager - Blind) Swimming was Australia's most successful sport at the combined Games winning 74 medals - 20 gold, 30 silver and 24 bronze.

=== Table Tennis ===
Australia represented by:
Men – Terry Biggs, Paul Croft, Garry Croker, Joe Marlow, Errol Smith
Women – Carmel Williams

Australian won a gold medal through Terry Biggs performance.

=== Weightlifting ===
Australia represented by:

Men – Brian McNicholl
Australia did not win a medal. Brian McNicholl came 4th in his event.

=== Wheelchair Basketball ===
Australia represented by:
Men – Michael Callahan, Kevin Coombs, David Gould, Erich Hubel, Charlie Ikstrum, Michael McFawn, Bruno Moretti (playing coach), Nick Morozoff, Richard Oliver, Peter Peterson, Mark Pope
Australia did not win a medal.

== See also ==
- Australia at the Paralympics
- Libby Kosmala
