= List of Australian Paralympic medallists =

This list includes Summer and Winter Australian Paralympic Medallists up to the 2014 Sochi Winter Paralympics.

Name	Gold	Silver	Bronze	Sport	Games	State	Refs
Alicia Aberley	0	2	2	Swimming	2000	New South Wales	
Ashley Adams	0	1	1	Shooting	2004	Queensland	
Julianne Adams	0	1	0	Wheelchair basketball	2000		
Rene Ahrens	0	0	2	Athletics	1980, 1988		
Dylan Alcott	1	0	0	Wheelchair basketball	2008		
Bryce Alman	0	2	0	Wheelchair rugby	2000, 2004, 2008		
Chris Alp	0	0	2	Athletics	1980		
Mark Altmann	0	0	1	Swimming	2000		
Michael Anderson	0	1	0	Swimming	2008		
Troy Andrews	1	0	0	Wheelchair basketball	1996		
Kieran Ault-Connell	2	1	0	Athletics	2000, 2004	Victoria	
Ben Austin	2	4	3	Swimming	2000, 2004	New South Wales	
Kate Bailey	0	0	4	Swimming	2000, 2004		
Greg Ball	3	0	1	Cycling	2000, 2004, 2008	Queensland	
Angie Ballard	0	1	1	Athletics	2004, 2008		
Petrea Barker	0	0	1	Swimming	1996		
Kelly Barnes	0	2	0	Swimming	1992		
Paul Barnett	1	0	1	Swimming	2000		
Tracy Barrell	2	0	0	Swimming	1992		
Ryley Batt	0	1	0	Wheelchair rugby	2004, 2008	New South Wales	
Denise Beckwith	0	0	1	Swimming	2000		
Daniel Bell	0	0	1	Swimming	2000		
Paul Benz	1	0	0	Athletics	2004		
Robert Biancucci	1	1	1	Athletics	1988		
Anthony Biddle	1	0	1	Athletics	2004		
Terry Biggs	1	0	0	Table Tennis	1984		
Kris Bignall	0	0	1	Boccia	1996		
Craig Blackburn	0	3	0	Swimming	1984		
Fabian Blattman	2	3	2	Athletics	1992, 1996, 2000		
Sandy Blythe	1	0	0	Wheelchair Basketball	1996		
Russell Boaden	0	0	1	Sailing	2008		
David Boldery	1	0	1	Lawn Bowls	1984, 1988		
Anthony Bonaccurso	0	0	1	Wheelchair Tennis	2004		
Eric Boulter	1	1	0	Swimming	1972		
Sarah Bowen	1	1	0	Swimming	2004, 2008		
Grant Boxall	0	1	0	Wheelchair Rugby	2008		
Brett Boylan	0	1	0	Wheelchair Rugby	2000		
Joanne Bradshaw	1	0	0	Athletics	2000		
Sam Bramham	2	2	1	Swimming	2004, 2008		
Shane Brand	0	1	0	Wheelchair Rugby	2008		
Scott Brockenshire	0	2	4	Swimming	1996, 2000		
Peter Brooks	2	0	1	Cycling Road	2004		
Georgia Bruce	0	0	2	Equestrian	2008		
Helena Brunner	5	1	1	Swimming	1984		
Kingsley Bugarin	5	8	6	Swimming	1984, 1988, 1992, 1996, 2000		
Bart Bunting	2	1	0	Alpine Skiing	2002		
Brendan Burkett	1	3	1	Swimming	1992, 1996, 2000		
Damien Burroughs	1	0	0	Athletics	1996		
Claire Burzynski	0	0	1	Wheelchair Basketball	2008		
Pauline Cahill	0	0	1	Lawn Powls	1996		
Melissa Carlton	2	4	2	Swimming	1996, 2000		
Cameron Carr	0	1	0	Wheelchair Rugby	2008, 2012		
Amanda Carter	0	2	0	Wheelchair Basketball	2000, 2012		
Barbara Caspers	5	1	1	Shooting	1980, 1984		
Orfeo Cecconato	1	0	0	Wheelchair Basketball	1996		
Daphne Ceeney	3	5	6	Archery, Athletics, Swimming, Table Tennis, Wheelchair Fencing	1960, 1964		
Allan Chadwick	1	0	0	Shooting	1984		
Lisa Chaffey	0	1	0	Wheelchair Basketball	2004		
Malcom Chalmers	1	1	2	Swimming	1984		
Shelley Chaplin	0	2	1	Wheelchair Basketball	2004, 2008, 2012		
Aaron Chatman	0	1	1	Athletics	2008		
June Clark	0	1	0	Lawn Bowls	1996		
Anthony Clarke	1	0	0	Judo	1996	South Australia	
Clifford Clarke	0	2	0	Wheelchair Rugby	1996		
Lichelle Clarke	0	1	1	Swimming	2004		
Paul Clohessy	1	1	1	Cycling Track	1996, 2000	Western Australia	
Blake Cochrane	2	1	0	Swimming	2008, 2012	Queensland	
Paula Coghlan	0	2	0	Wheelchair Basketball	2000, 2004		
Ellie Cole	4	1	4	Swimming	2008, 2012	Victoria	
Lyn Coleman	0	2	0	Athletics	1984	Queensland	
Darren Collins	0	0	2	Athletics	1992		
Dominic Collins	0	1	0	Swimming	1996		
Richard Colman	2	2	2	Athletics	2004, 2008, 2012		
Mick Connell	0	2	0	Wheelchair Tennis	1988, 1996		
Kerri-Anne Connor	0	4	1	Swimming	1984	Queensland	
Carolyn Connors	0	2	1	Swimming	1980	New South Wales	
Kevin Coombs				Athletics		Victoria	
Priya Cooper	9	3	4	Swimming	1992, 1996, 2000		
Richard Cordukes	0	1	1	Athletics	1988		
Leroi Court	0	0	1	Athletics	1996		
Lionel Cousens	0	1	0	Archery	1964		
Matthew Cowdrey	13	5	3	Swimming	2004, 2008, 2012		
Benjamin Cox	1	0	0	Wheelchair Basketball	1996		
Lee Cox	0	1	0	Athletics	2000		
Rachael Cox		1		Sailing	2008		
Charmaine Cree	1	1	3	Athletics	1980		
Cobi Crispin	0	1	1	Wheelchair Basketball	2008, 2012		
Garry Croker	0	1	0	Wheelchair Rugby	2000		
Paul Cross	1	0	0	Swimming	2000		
Tracey Cross	4	5	1	Swimming	1992, 1996, 2000		
Robert Crowe	1	0	1	Cycle Track	2004		
Anne Currie	3	0	2	Swimming	1984, 1992		
Roy Daniell	0	1	1	Athletics	2000, 2004		
Donald Dann	0	1	0	Athletics	1984		
Gemma Dashwood	4	3	1	Swimming	1996, 2000		
Christie Dawes	0	1	1	Athletics	2008, 2012		
Mark Davies	2	0	0	Athletics	1984		
Cameron de Burgh	0	3	1	Swimming	1996, 2000		
Ben Demery	0	2	0	Cycling Track	2008		
Madison de Rozario	0	1	0	Athletics	2008		
Michael Desanto	0	1	1	Athletics	1988		
Jason Diederich	0	1	0	Swimming	1992		
Daniela Di Toro	0	1	1	Wheelchair Tennis	2000, 2004		
Lorraine Dodd	3	1	1	Athletics, Swimming	1968		
Jay Dohnt	0	0	1	Swimming	2008		
Melanie Domaschenz	0	1	1	Wheelchair Basketball	2004, 2008		
Patrick Donachie	1	0	0	Swimming	2000		
Therese Donovan	0	3	2	Swimming	1984		
Michael Dow	2	1	1	Swimming, Weightlifting	1964		
Brendan Dowler	1	1	0	Wheelchair Basketball	2004, 2008		
Julie Dowling	1	0	0	Athletics	1984		
Jeremy Doyle	1	3	2	Swimming	1988, 1992		
Mandy Drennan	0	0	1	Swimming	2004		
Brad Dubberley	0	1	0	Wheelchair Rugby	2000		
Alan Dufty	2	4	4	Athletics	1984, 1988, 1992		
Mellissa Dunn	0	1	0	Wheelchair Basketball	2000		
Jamie Dunross	1	0	0	Sailing	2000		
Rosemary Eames	1	4	0	Swimming	1984		
Stephen Eaton	1	0	1	Athletics	1996, 2000		
John Eden	0	2	1	Athletics	1988, 1992, 1996		
Elizabeth Edmondson	5	1	0	Swimming	1964, 1968		
Joe Egan				Volleyball Standing	1964		
Don Elgin	1	3	0		2000		
Kerrie Engel	0	0	1	Swimming	1984		
Pauline English	2	0	3	Swimming, Athletics	1972, 1976, 1980		
Nazim Erdem	1	2	0	Wheelchair Rugby	2000, 2008, 2012		
Stuart Ewin	1	0	0	Wheelchair Basketball	1996		
David Evans	2	1	0	Athletics	1996		
Meredith Evans	0	1	4	Swimming	1984		
Justin Eveson	1	3	1	Swimming, Wheelchair Basketball	2000, 2004, 2008, 2012		
Rosalie Fahey	0	0	1	Equestrian	2000		
Janelle Falzon	1	0	2	Swimming	1996		
Karen Farrell	0	2	0	Wheelchair Basketball	2000, 2004		
Michael Farrell	0	0	1	Powerlifting	1988		
Kurt Fearnley	3	6	2	Athletics	2000, 2004, 2008, 2012		
John Federico	0	1	0	Athletics	1984		
Karl Feifar	1	1	0	Athletics	1992		
Rebecca Feldman	1	1	1	Athletics	2000		
Daniel Fitzgibbon	1	1	0	Sailing	2008, 2012		
Grant Fitzpatrick	0	2	0	Swimming	1996		
Andrew Flavel	0	1	0	Whellchair Basketball	2004		
Anton Flavel	1	0	0	Athletics	2000		
Trish Flavel	0	0	1	Athletics	2000		
Pam Foley	0	2	0	Swimming	1972		
John Forsberg	0	2	1	Lawn Bowls	1984, 1988		
Roy Fowler	6	3	1	Archery, Lawn Bowls, Swimming	1964, 1972, 1984, 1988	Queensland	
Heath Francis	6	4	3	Athletics	2000, 2004, 2008	New South Wales	
Amanda Fraser	0	3	2	Swimming	2000, 2004, 2008	Queensland	
Tracey Freeman	6	4	0	Athletics	1972, 1976		
Trevor French	0	1	0	Swimming	1964		
Jacqueline Freney	8	0	3	Swimming	2008, 2012	Queensland	
Neil Fuller	6	6	3	Athletics	1992, 1996, 2000, 2004		
Jessica Gallagher	0	0	2	Skiing	2010, 2014	Victoria	
Michael Gallagher	2	0	2	Cycling	2008, 2012		
Toireasa Gallagher	0	3	1	Cycling	2004, 2008	New South Wales	
Darren Gardiner	0	2	0	powerlifting	2004, 2008		
Kylie Gauci	0	2	1	Wheelchair Basketball	2004, 2008, 2012		
Steven George	0	0	1	Cycling	2008		
Terry Giddy	1	3	2	Athletics	1972, 1984, 1988, 1992, 1996		
Karen Gill	0	1	0	Athletics	1988		
Paul Gockel	0	1	0	Swimming	1996		
Murray Goldfinch	0	0	1	Athletics	2000		
Kerry Golding	1	0	0	Cycling	1996	New South Wales	
David Goodman	1	0	0	Athletics	1988		
David Gould	1	0	0	Wheelchair basketball	1996		
Matthew Gray	2	1	0	Cycling	1996, 2000	Western Australia	
Judith Green	1	0	0	Swimming	2000		
Marsha Green	0	1	1	Athletics	1992		
David Griffin	0	0	3	Swimming	1984, 1988	New South Wales	
Adrian Grogan	2	0	0	Athletics	2000	New South Wales	
Gary Gudgeon	5	3	1	Swimming	1980, 1984		
Michael Hackett	0	1	1	Athletics	1988, 1992		
Alex Hadley	1	1	0	Swimming	2004		
Benjamin Hall	1	0	0	Athletics	2004	South Australia	
Melanie Hall	0	0	1	Wheelchair basketball	2008		
Greg Hammond	5	4	0	Swimming	1984, 1988		
Peter Harding	0	1	0	Wheelchair rugby	2000	Victoria	
Jeff Hardy	3	0	1	Swimming	1996, 2000	New South Wales	
Alex Harris	0	2	2	Swimming	2000	Victoria	
Colin Harrison	0	0	1	Sailing	2008		
Darren Harry	1	0	0	Cycling	2000		
Michael Hartnett	1	1	0	Wheelchair basketball	2008, 2012		
Brian Harvey	1	1	0	Athletics	1996, 2000		
Tony Head	0	1	0	Athletics	1992		
Gerry Hewson	1	0	0	Wheelchair basketball	1996		
David Higgins	0	1	0	Archery	1984		
Julie Higgins	2	0	0	Equestrian	2000		
Brad Hill	1	1	0	Athletics	1988		
Katie Hill	0	1	1	Wheelchair Basketball	2008, 2012		
Peter Hill	0	2	0	Swimming	1980		
Marita Hird	0	0	1	Equestrian	2000	Victoria	
Sue Hobbs	0	3	0	Athletics	1980		
Madeleine Hogan	0	0	2	Athletics	2008, 2012	Victoria	
Brett Holcombe	3	1	0	Athletics	1984		
Deborah Holland	0	0	1	Swimming	1988		
Eddy Hollands	0	1	1	Cycling	1996, 2000	Western Australia	
Lynda Holt	0	1	0	Athletics	2000		
Peter Homann	3	3	1	Cycling	1996, 2000, 2004		
Gary Hooper	2	5	0	Athletics, Weightlifting	1960, 1964, 1968		
Shaun Hopkins	0	2	0	Cycling	2008		
Lindy Hou	1	3	2	Cycling	2004, 2008		
Erich Hubel	0	1	2	Athletics	1980		
George Hucks	0	2	0	Wheelchair rugby	2000, 2008		
Catherine Huggett	1	1	0	Swimming	1988, 1992		
Tu Huyhn	0	0	1	Boccia	1996		
David Johnson	0	1	0	Wheelchair tennis	2000		
Felicity Johnson	1	1	0	Cycling	2008, 2012		
Lachlan Jones	1	0	0	Athletics	1996		
Marayke Jonkers	0	1	2	Swimming	2004, 2008		
Meredith Jones	0	1	0	Athletics	1988		
Toby Kane	0	0	2	Alpine skiing	2006, 2014	New South Wales	
Bridie Kean	0	1	1	Wheelchair Basketball	2008, 2012	Victoria	
Tom Kennedy	0	1	0	Wheelchair Rugby	2000 Sydney	New South Wales	1
John Kestel	1	0	1	Dartchery, Athletics	1976		
Adrian King	1	1	0	Wheelchair Basketball	2004, 2008	New South Wales	
Peter Kirby	1	1	3	Athletics	1984		
Tristan Knowles	1	2	0	Wheelchair Basketball	2004, 2008, 2012		
Susan Knox	0	0	1	Swimming	1988		
Norma Koplick	0	1	0	Athletics	2000	Queensland	
Libby Kosmala	9	3	1	Shooting, Swimming	1972, 1976, 1980, 1984, 1988		
Stan Kosmala	1	0	0	Lawn Bowls	1988		
Roy Kubig	0	0	1	Swimming	1976	Queensland	
Paul Lake	1	2	1	Cycling	1996, 2000	Victoria	
Bill Latham	0	1	0	Wheelchair Basketball	2012		
Tyson Lawrence	1	0	1	Cycling	2008		
Mark le Flohic	2	1	1	Cycling	1988, 2004	Western Australia	
Peter Leek	3	4	1	Swimming	2008	New South Wales	
Jason Lees	1	0	0	Wheelchair Rugby	2012		
Lyn Lepore	1	1	1	Cycling	2000	Western Australia	
Matt Levy	2	1	3	Swimming	2008, 2012		
Kat Lewis	0	0	2	Swimming	2004, 2008		
Tracey Lewis	0	3	1	Swimming	1984		
Wayne Lewis	0	1	0	Lawn bowls	1984		
Dianna Ley	0	0	1	Swimming	2000		
Karni Liddell	0	0	2	Swimming	1996, 2000		
Lyn Lillecrapp	0	3	3	Swimming	1976, 1988		
Bryce Lindores	0	1	1	Cycling	2008, 2012		
Janelle Lindsay	1	0	1	Cycling	2004		
John Lindsay	3	3	3	Athletics	1992, 1996, 2000		
Alexandra Lisney (née Green)	0	0	1	Cycling	2012		
Lisa Llorens	4	1	1	Athletics	1996, 2000		
Adrian Lowe	2	3	0	Athletics	1988		
Hamish MacDonald	1	1	0	Athletics	1996, 2004		
Hannah MacDougall	0	0	1	Swimming	2004	Victoria	
John Maclean	0	1	0	Rowing	2008		
Eric Magennis	3	0	0	Lawn Bowls	1972, 1976, 1984		
Timothy Maloney	1	0	0	Wheelchair Basketball	1996	South Australia	
Peter Marsh	0	0	2	Athletics	1976	Queensland	
Graeme Martin	1	0	1	Sailing	2000, 2008	Western Australia	
John Martin	0	1	0	Archery	1964		
Terry Mason	0	0	2	Athletics, Weightlifting	1972, 1976		
Bill Mather-Brown	0	2	0	Table tennis	1960, 1968		
Tim Matthews	3	0	2	Athletics	1996, 2000		
Marty Mayberry	0	1	0	Men's alpine skiing	2010		
Mandy Maywood	1	1	3	Swimming	1988, 1992		
Kelly McCombie	0	0	2	Cycling	2004		
Kerrod McGregor	3	4	2	Track and field	1984, 1988, 1996		
Lisa McIntosh	5	1	1	Athletics	2000, 2004, 2008		
Deahnne McIntyre	1	2	1	Athletics	1988		
Robert McIntyre	1	1	4	Athletics	1968, 1972, 1980, 1984		
Tina Mckenzie	0	2	1	Wheelchair basketball	2004, 2008, 2012		
Claire McLean	0	1	0	Cycling	2004	Western Australia	
Yvette McLellan	0	2	0	Athletics	1988		
Allan McLucas	2	0	1	Athletics, Table Tennis, Archery	1964, 1968		
Brian McNicholl	1	2	2	Athletic, Weightlifting, Powerlifting	1976, 1980, 1988, 1992, 1996		
John Mcphail							
Campbell Message	0	1	0	Wheelchair Basketball	2004	Victoria	
Michael Milton	6	3	2	Alpine Skiing	1992, 1994, 2002, 2006	Canberra	
Paul Mitchell	1	0	0	Athletics	2000		
Grant Mizens	1	2	0	Wheelchair Basketball	2004, 2008, 2012	New South Wales	
Kieran Modra	5	0	4	Swimming, Cycling	1992, 1996, 2004, 2008, 2012		
Tania Modra	2	0	0	Cycling	2000		
Ricardo Moffatti	0	1	1	Swimming	2004		
Patricia Molseed	1	0	0	Athletics	1988		
Jemima Moore	0	1	0	Paralympic athletics	2008		
Ken Moran	0	1	0	Lawn bowls	1984		
Bruno Moretti	1	3	0	Table tennis, Athletics	1968		
Michael Morley	1	0	1	Athletics	1984		
Nick Morris	1	0	0	Men's wheelchair basketball	1996		
Alison Mosely	0	2	0	Wheelchair basketball	2000, 2004		
Christopher Mullins	1	0	0	Athletics	2008		
David Munk	0	0	2	Alpine Skiing	1992, 1994		
Kevin Munro	1	1	0	Athletics	1968	South Australia	
Brad Ness	1	2	0	Wheelchair Basketball	2004, 2008, 2012	Western Australia	
Andrew Newell	0	0	2	Athletics	2000	New South Wales	
Richard Nicholson	0	2	1	Powerlifting	2000, 2004, 2012		
Lynette Nixon	1	1	1	Cycling	2000		
James Nomarhas	0	1	0	Shooting	1996	New South Wales	
Shaun Norris	1	2	0	Wheelchair Basketball	2004, 2008, 2012		
Michael Norton	2	0	1	Alpine Skiing	1992, 1994		
Tamara Nowitzki	0	1	0	Swimming	2000	Queensland	
Rodney Nugent							
Paul Nunnari							
Marion O'Brien							
Evan O'Hanlon							
Kathleen O'kelly-Kennedy							
Paul O'Neill							
Lisa O'Nion							
Andrew O'Sullivan							
Richard Oliver							
Tracey Oliver							
Andrew Panazzolo	0	1	1	Cycling	2004	South Australia	
Jayme Paris	0	0	2	Cycling	2008, 2012	New South Wales	
Katie Parker	0	1	0	Cycling	2008		
Sarnya Parker	2	0	0	Cycling	2000	South Australia	
Craig Parsons	0	1	0	Wheelchair Rugby	2000	Western Australia	
Nigel Parsons	2	0	0	Athletic	1988		
Wayne Patchett	4	1	0	Athletics	1976, 1980		
Siobhan Paton	6			Swimming	2000		
James Patterson	1	1	2	Alpine Skiing	1994, 1998		
Rick Pendleton	3	0	2	Swimming	2004, 2008, 2012		
Jan Pike							
Stewart Pike							
Matthew Poble							
Fred Pointer							
Daniel Polson							
Frank Ponta							
Teresa Poole							
Katrina Porter							
Steve Porter							
Kath Proudfoot							
Branka Pupovac	0	1	0	Wheelchair Tennis	2000		
Alison Quinn	3	1	1	Athletics	1992, 1996, 2000	New South Wales	
Sharon Rackham	1	1	0	Athletics	1996, 2000		
Cameron Rahles Rahbula	0	0	2	Alpine Skiing	2010		
Paul Raison	0	1	1		2008		
Neville Read	0	0	1	Lawn Bowls	1988		
Casey Redford	0	0	1	Swimming	2000		
Brett Reid							
Vic Renalson							
Cliff Rickard							
Sam Rickard							
Donna Ritchie							
Noel Robins							
David Rolfe							
Jaime Romaguera							
Nadya Romeo							
Sarah Rose							
Kathryn Ross							
Margaret Ross							
Julie Russell							
Patrick Ryan							
Wayne Ryding							
Jane Sachs							
Troy Sachs							
Louise Sauvage							
Elaine Schreiber							
Brad Scott							
Christopher Scott							
Ryan Scott							
David Selby							
Janet Shaw							
David Short							
Russell Short							
Jeff Simmonds							
Stephen Simmonds							
Tige Simmons							
Sharon Slann							
Jason Smart							
Donna Smith							
Greg Smith							
Julie Smith							
Ralph Smith							
Sandra Smith							
Robert Staddon							
Kial Stewart							
Sarah Stewart							
Brett Stibners							
Brooke Stockham							
Carla Sullivan							
Tim Sullivan	10			Athletics	2000, 2004, 2008, 2012		
Ross Sutton							
Clifford Swann							
Danae Sweetapple							
Peter Tait							
Charlie Tapscott							
Daryl Taylor							
Liesl Tesch							
Bradley Thomas	1	1	2	Athletics	1988, 1992, 1996	Tasmania, New South Wales	
Darren Thrupp							
Bruce Thwaite							
Phillip Tracey							
Geoff Trappett							
Ian Trewhella							
Peter Trotter							
Vincenzo Vallelonga							
Matthew van Eldik							
Scott Vitale							
Robert Walden							
Mary-Anne Wallace							
Bruce Wallrodt							
Jason Walsh							
Shane Walsh							
Prue Watt							
Katrina Webb							
Rod Welsh							
Annabelle Williams							
Lucy Williams							
Stacey Williams							
Jodi Willis-Roberts							
Melissa Willson							
Stephen Wilson							
Amy Winters							
Christine Wolf							
Chantel Wolfenden							
Valerie Woodbridge							
Elizabeth Wright	0	1	2	Swimming	1996, 2000	New South Wales	
Sandra Yaxley	1	0	1	Swimming	1992		.
Judith Young	0	3	1	Swimming	1996		
Melinda Young	0	1	0	Wheelchair basketball	2004		
