= Lawn bowls at the 1984 Summer Paralympics =

Lawn bowls at the VII Paralympic Games
- Paralympic Lawn bowls

Paralympic symbol (1988-1994)

Lawn bowls at the 1984 Summer Paralympics consisted of eleven events.

== Medal summary ==
Event	Gold	Silver	Bronze
Men's pairs A2/4	Ireland (IRL); Bill Ensor; Paul Smyth	Great Britain (GBR); J. Gladman; Bernard Wessier	Australia (AUS); Clifford Swann; Keith Zotti
Men's pairs A6/8	Great Britain (GBR); Richard Coates; Anthony Prowse	Australia (AUS); John Forsberg; Robert Wedderburn	Indonesia (INA); Kurnianto; Lesmana Memed
Men's pairs paraplegic	Australia (AUS); Roy Fowler; Eric Magennis	Australia (AUS); Wayne Lewis; Ken Moran	Great Britain (GBR); John Gronow; Paul Hubball
Men's singles A2/4	Paul Smyth; Ireland	Eddie van der Heiden; Zimbabwe	David Boldery; Australia
Men's singles A6/8	Richard Coates; Great Britain	John Forsberg; Australia	John Newton; Australia
Men's singles paraplegic	Roy Fowler; Australia	Paul Hubball; Great Britain	Chris Gibson; Great Britain
Men's singles tetraplegic	K. Ellison; Great Britain	Isabel Barr; Great Britain	Tommy Taylor; Great Britain
Mixed pairs paraplegic	Great Britain (GBR); R. Thompson; T. Ure	Great Britain (GBR); Ken Bridgeman; Yvonne Hawtin	Ireland (IRL); Alice Bailey; Angela Hendra
Women's pairs paraplegic	Ireland (IRL); Alice Bailey; Angela Hendra	Great Britain (GBR); Yvonne Hawtin; R. Thompson	Japan (JPN); Ekeda; N. Tamaya
Women's singles A2/4	A. Smith; Great Britain	Umardiyani Ninik; Indonesia	Melody Williamson; United States
Women's singles paraplegic	Yvonne Hawtin; Great Britain	R. Thompson; Great Britain	Angela Hendra; Ireland
