= Julie Dowling =

Julie Dowling may refer to:

- Julie Dowling (artist) (born 1969), Indigenous Australian artist
- Julie Dowling (athlete) (born 1959), Australian Paralympian
