= Margaret Booth (disambiguation) =

Margaret Booth (1898–2002) was an American film editor.

Margaret Booth may also refer to:

- Margaret Booth (judge) (1933–2021), British High Court judge
- Margaret Booth (Paralympian), Australian Paralympic athlete and goalball player
- Margaret Booth (jockey), winner of Torrey Pines Stakes
