= Carol Young (swimmer) =

Australian Paralympic swimmer

Personal information
- Nationality: Australia
Medal record
Swimming
Paralympic Games
Silver medal – second place	1984 New York/Stoke Mandeville	Women's 100 m Breaststroke A2
Bronze medal – third place	1984 New York/Stoke Mandeville	Women's 100 m Butterfly A2

Carol Young is a Paralympic swimmer from Australia. She was a classified "A2" competitor at the 1984 New York/Stoke Mandeville Paralympics representing Australia in backstroke, freestyle, individual medley, butterfly and breaststroke events. She won a silver medal in the 100 m breaststroke A2 event and a bronze medal in the 100 m butterfly A2 event.
