= David McPherson (Paralympian) =

Australian Paralympic athlete

Personal information
- Nationality: Australia
Medal record
Athletics
Paralympic Games
Silver medal – second place	1984 New York / Stoke Mandeville	Men's 100 m 2
Bronze medal – third place	1984 New York / Stoke Mandeville	Men's 200 m 2

David McPherson is a Paralympic athletics and swimming competitor from Australia who competed in the 1980 Summer Paralympics and 1984 Summer Paralympics as a classified "2" athlete. At the 1984 Summer Paralympics he won two medals in athletics: a silver medal in the Men's 100 m 2 event and a bronze in the Men's 200 m 2 event.
