= Jan Randles =

Australian Paralympic athlete (1945–2025)

Jan Randles OAM
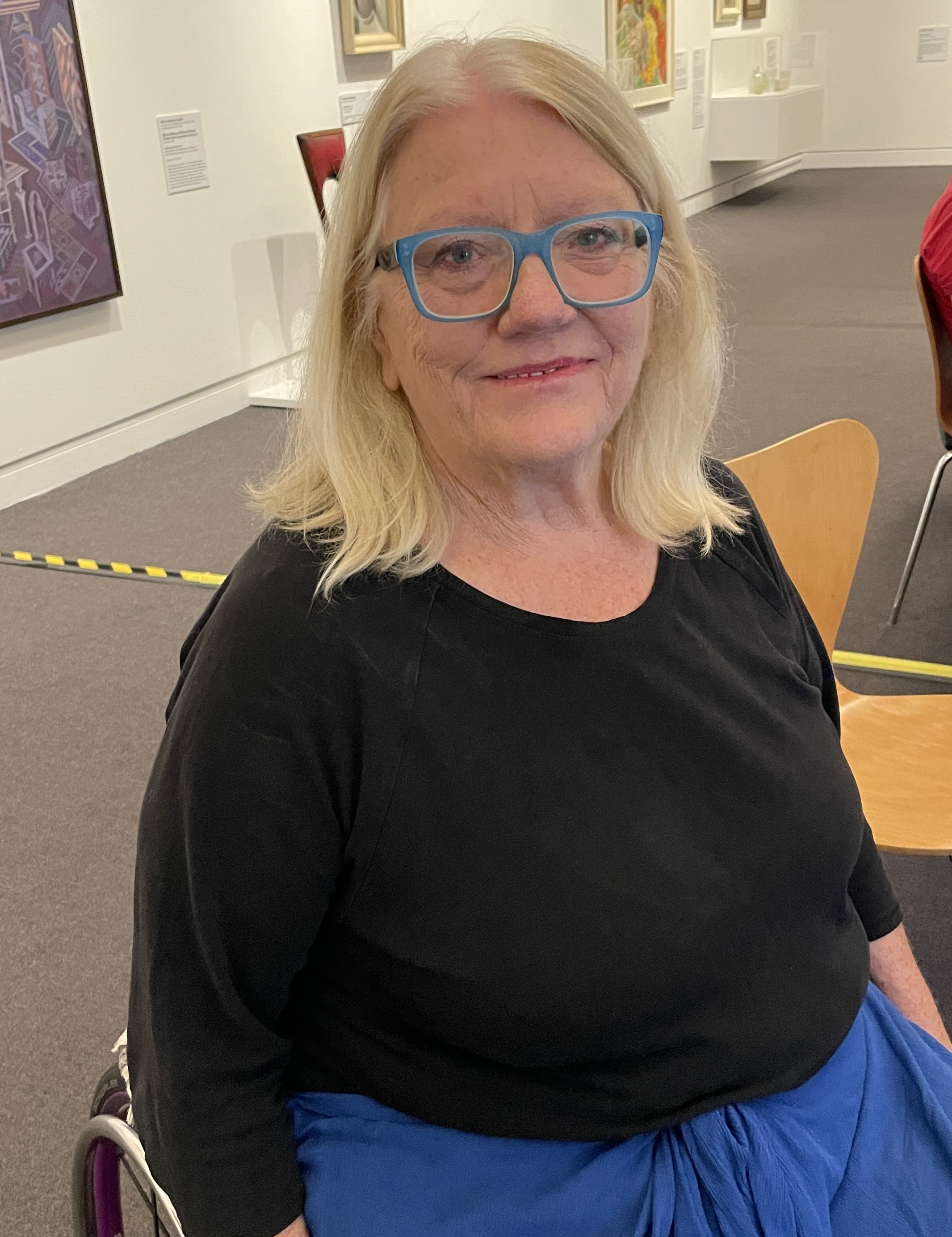
- Randles in 2024

Personal information
- Nationality: Australia
- Born: 23 August 1945 Melbourne, Victoria, Australia
- Died: 12 January 2025 (aged 79) Frankston, Victoria, Australia
Medal record
Athletics
Paralympic Games
Gold medal – first place	1984 New York/Stoke Mandeville	Women's Marathon 4
Bronze medal – third place	1984 New York/Stoke Mandeville	Women's 5000 m 4

Janice Margaret Randles OAM (23 August 1945 – 12 January 2025) was an Australian Paralympic athlete who competed in the 1984 New York/Stoke Mandeville Paralympics and won two medals - gold and bronze. She was the first female Australian Paralympian to win a Paralympic Games marathon. The next Australian woman to win a Paralympic marathon was Madison de Rozario at the 2020 Summer Paralympics.

Randles was awarded Medal of the Order of Australia (OAM) in June 2024 for service to Paralympic sports.

== Background ==
Randles was born in Melbourne on 23 August 1945. In 1974 whilst holidaying in Bali, she fell off a motorbike and broke her back. Her working career was in the advertising industry. Randles died at the Frankston Palliative Care Centre, in Frankston, Victoria, on 12 January 2025, at the age of 79.

== Sporting career ==
Randles was classified "4" athlete in the Women's Marathon, 5000 m, 1500 m and 800 m at the 1984 New York/Stoke Mandeville Paralympics. She won two medals: a gold medal in the Women's Marathon 4 event and a bronze in the Women's 5000 m 4 event.

In 1985, she won the 100m, 200m and 400m events at the Australia Games. She competed at the 1985 World Cup in Athletics in Canberra in the women’s 800m demonstration race where she came second to world champion Monika Saker.

At the 32nd International Stoke Mandeville Games in 1986, she won gold medals in the Women's 5000m and marathon, silver in the Women's 400m and bronze medals in the Women's 800m and 1500m.

== Resources about ==
A collection of biographical cuttings on Randles is available at the National Library of Australia, and she is featured in a video published in 2012 to mark the 50th anniversary of Disability Sport and Recreation.
