= Stephen Muir =

Australian Paralympic athlete

Personal information
- Nationality: Australia
Medal record
Athletics
Paralympic Games
| Silver medal – second place | 1984 New York/Stoke Mandeville | Men's Triple Jump A5 |

Stephen Muir is an Australian Paralympic amputee athletics competitor from the Sunshine Coast, Queensland.

He was born without any hands. At the 1984 New York Games, he won a silver medal in the Men's Triple Jump A5.

He supported his athletics career by operating a lawn mowing business. In 2005, he worked as a traffic controller and a groundsman. In 2005, he was awarded a certificate for fifteen years service to Queensland State Emergency Service.
