= Michael Quinn (Paralympian) =

Australian Paralympic athlete

Personal information
- Nationality: Australia
Medal record
Paralympic Games
Athletics
Silver medal – second place	1984 New York/Stoke Mandeville	Men's 4 x 200m Relay 1A-1C
Bronze medal – third place	1984 New York/Stoke Mandeville	Men's Slalom 1B
Bronze medal – third place	1984 New York/Stoke Mandeville	Men's 4 x 100m Relay 1A-1C
Swimming
Bronze medal – third place	1984 New York/Stoke Mandeville	Men's 3 x 25m Freestyle Relay 1A-1C

Michael Mike Quinn is an Australian Paralympic athletics, swimming and snooker competitor.

In 1972, at the age of 19, a car accident left him a quadriplegic. Before the accident, he played in the Brisbane schoolboy rugby union team and was junior belt champion for the Bribie Island Surf Life Saving Club. While he was in hospital, Roy Fowler, an Australian Paralympian was in the bed next to him having his kidney removed. Fowler encouraged him to stay involved in sport. Nine months after the accident, he was competing in wheelchair sports events.

He competed at the 1984 Stoke Mandeville Games in athletics and swimming. He won a silver medal in the athletics Men's 4 × 200 m 1A-1C and bronze medals in athletics Men's 4 × 100 m Relay 1A-1C, Men's Slalom IB, and swimming Men's 3 x 25m Freestyle Relay 1A-1C. After the Games, he dedicated himself to snooker as it was the only sport that allowed him to compete against able-bodied people. He competed in snooker at the 1988 Seoul Paralympics. In 1992, he was selected in the first Australian wheelchair rugby team to compete in an international tournament.
