= Stephen Sargolia =

Australian Paralympic athlete

Personal information
- Nationality: Australia
Medal record
Athletics
Paralympic Games
Silver medal – second place	1984 New York/Stoke Mandeville	Men's 400 m A4
Silver medal – second place	1984 New York/Stoke Mandeville	Men's Long Jump A4

Stephen Sargolia is an Australian Paralympic amputee athletics competitor. At the 1984 New York Games, he won two silver medals in Men's 400 m A4 and Men's Long Jump A4.
