= James Hoggan (athlete) =

Australian paralympic athlete (1959–2020)

Personal information
- Nickname: Peg Leg
- Nationality: Australia
- Born: 24 March 1959
- Died: 22 April 2020 (aged 61) Melbourne
Medal record
Athletics
Paralympic Games
Silver medal – second place	1984 New York/Stoke Mandeville	Men's High Jump A4
FESPIC Games
Gold medal – first place	1982 Sha Tin	Men's High Jump
Silver medal – second place	1982 Sha Tin	Men's Long Jump

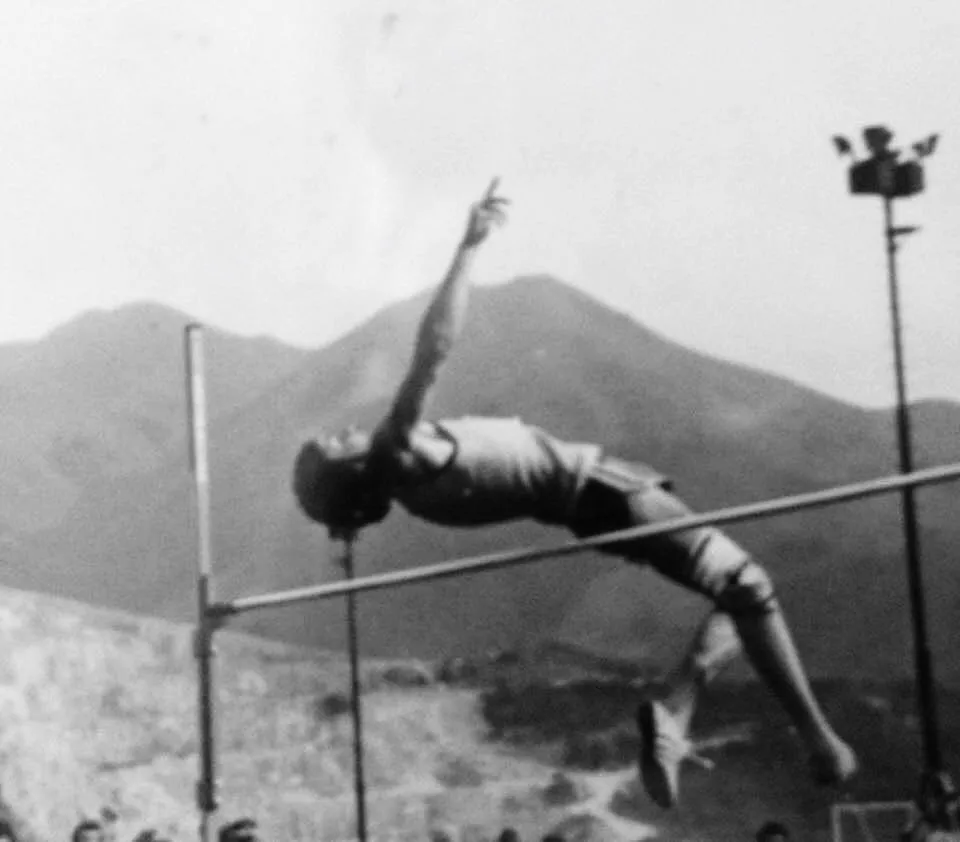

James Vernon Hoggan (24 March 1959 – 22 April 2020) was an Australian Paralympic amputee athletics competitor. At the 1984 New York Games, he won a silver medal in the Men's High Jump A4.

== Personal ==
Hoggan's father Colin moved to Australia from Scotland due to more opportunities as a professional runner. His father won the 1956 Stawell Gift mile. Hoggan attended Wangaratta Technical College from 1973 to 1977. On his eighteenth birthday, Hoggan suffered severe injuries when his motorbike collided with a utility vehicle. After being in hospital for 18 months and 22 operations, Hoggan decided to have the lower part of his right leg amputated. Two months after the amputation, he had a prosthesis fitted and returned to work at Valchem in Wangaratta. He had the nickname 'Peg Leg'. He was married to Cheryl and they had two sons - Peter and Justin. In the later part of his life, Hoggan developed Hodgkin's lymphoma. On 11 April 2020, he experienced a massive heart attack and died at Royal Melbourne Hospital on 22 April 2020 aged 61 years.

== Sporting career ==
As a twelve year old, Hoggan won 1500 m and finished third in the long jump at Victorian Amateur Athletic Championships. At the age of sixteen, he moved to playing basketball. After his leg amputation, he returned to athletics. In 1980, he finished second in the high jump at an able bodied competition. At his first major disability sport competition, Victorian Amputee Association Championships, he broke the Class C high jump world record of 1.45 m with a jump of 1.60m. In March 1981, he increased the world record to 1.67 m and later in the year jumped 1.74 m.

At the 1982 FESPIC Games in Sha Tin, Hong Kong, he won the gold medal in the high jump with a world record of 1.80 m and a silver medal in the long jump. At the 1984 New York Paralympic Games, he won the silver medal in the Men's High Jump A4 with a jump of 1.73 m. After Hoggan retired, he became President of Victorian Amputees Association North East Branch.

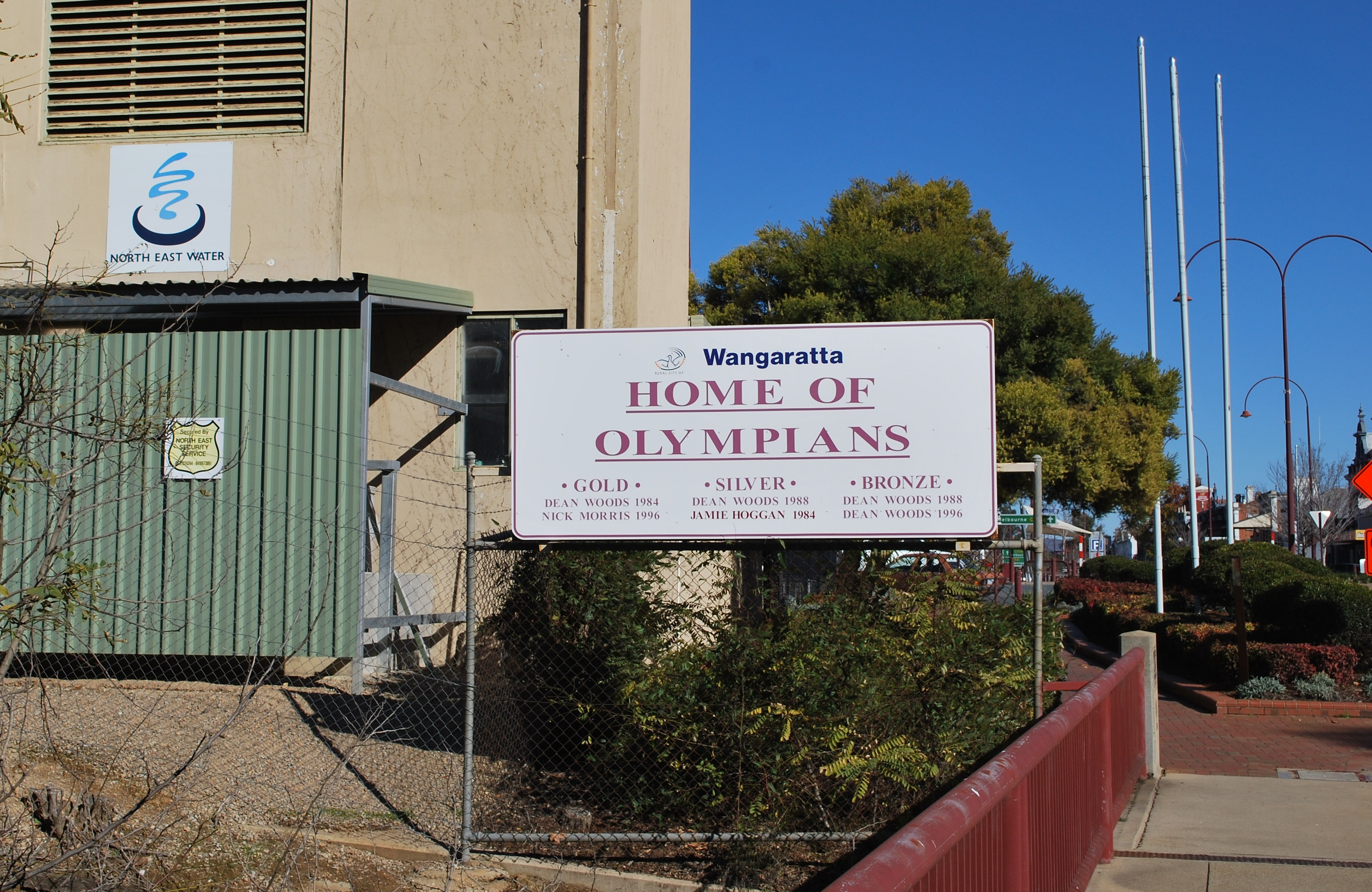
Wangaratta City Entry Sign - Woods, Morris and Hoggan

Hoggan has been one of Wangaratta's most successful athletes and he listed with Olympian Dean Woods and Paralympian Nick Morris on the entry sign into the city centre.
