= Prue-Anne Reynalds =

Australian Paralympic athlete

Personal information
- Nationality: Australia
Medal record
Athletics
Paralympic Games
Bronze medal – third place	1984 New York/Stoke Mandeville	Women's 3000 m B1

Prue-Anne Reynalds is an Australian Paralympic athlete and cyclist. She competed in the 1984 New York/Stoke Mandeville Paralympics in athletics events as a classified "B1" athlete where she won a bronze in the Women's 3000 m B1 event. She also competed in the mixed tandem open cycling road event at the 1992 Summer Paralympics but did not win a medal.
