= Ursula King =

Australian Paralympic swimmer

Personal information
- Nationality: Australia
Medal record
Swimming
Paralympic Games
Silver medal – second place	1984 New York/Stoke Mandeville	Women's 50 m Freestyle 3
Bronze medal – third place	1984 New York/Stoke Mandeville	Women's 200 m Freestyle 3
Bronze medal – third place	1984 New York/Stoke Mandeville	Women's 25 m Butterfly 3

Ursula King is a Paralympic swimmer from Australia. She was a classified "3" competitor at the 1984 New York Stoke/Mandeville Paralympics representing Australia in freestyle and butterfly events. She won silver in the 50m freestyle, and two bronzes in the 200 m freestyle and 25 m butterfly.
