= John Federico =

Australian Paralympic athlete

Personal information
- Nationality: Australia
Medal record
Athletics
Paralympic Games
Silver medal – second place	1984 New York/Stoke Mandeville	Men's Slalom 5

John Federico is an Australian Paralympic athlete. He won a silver medal at the 1984 New York/Stoke Mandeville Paralympics in the Men's Slalom 5 event and participated in athletics at the 1988 Seoul Paralympics.
