= Donald Dann =

Personal information
- Full name: Donald William Dann
- Nickname: Doc
- Nationality: Australia
- Born: 12 February 1949 Wynyard, Tasmania
- Died: 31 July 2005 (aged 56) Burnie, Tasmania
Medal record
Athletics
Paralympic Games
Silver medal – second place	1984 New York/Stoke Mandeville	Men's Javelin A4

Donald "Doc" William Dann, OAM (12 February 1949 – 31 July 2005) was an Australian Paralympic athlete and table tennis player. He was born in the Tasmanian town of Wynyard. He lost a leg to a land mine in the Vietnam War, where he served in the 3rd Cavalry Regiment from 3 December 1968 to 2 June 1969. He competed in athletics and table tennis at the 1980 Arnhem Paralympics and won a silver medal in the Men's Javelin A4 event at the 1984 New York/Stoke Mandeville Paralympics.

He founded the Tasmanian Amputee Sporting Association, was involved with several charity military and civilian organisations, and was involved with local football. He was awarded life membership of the Burnie sub-branch of the Returned and Services League of Australia in 2002, along with a Medal of the Order of Australia in 2004, due to his strong involvement in the organisation. He died on 31 July 2005, aged 56, in Burnie.
