= Robert Staddon (swimmer) =

Australian Paralympic swimmer

Personal information
- Nationality: Australian
- Born: 1960 (age 65–66)
Medal record
Men's swimming
Representing Australia
Paralympic Games
Bronze medal – third place	1984 New York/ Stoke Mandeville	100 m Freestyle 1C
Bronze medal – third place	1984 New York/ Stoke Mandeville	25 m Backstroke 1C
Bronze medal – third place	1984 New York/ Stoke Mandeville	3×25 m Freestyle Relay 1A–1C

Robert "Bob" Staddon (born 1960) is an Australian Paralympic swimmer who won three bronze medals at the 1984 New York/Stoke Mandeville Paralympics.

== Personal ==
Staddon was born in 1960 and grew up in the Sydney suburb of Avalon. In 1972, his family moved to Cooranbong and in 1973 to the Newcastle suburb of New Lambton. He attended Broadmeadow High School until 1977. After leaving school, he joined the Royal Australian Navy as an able seaman. In September 1980, he had a water slide accident in Jakarta, Indonesia that resulted him becoming a quadriplegic. He underwent rehabilitation including swimming at Royal North Shore Hospital. He was coached by Eric Arnold at the Junction Swim Centre in Newcastle. From 1982 to 1986, he focussed on swimming and worked as an instructor at Forster and Junction Swim Centre. He then lectured on the prevention of spinal injuries for Royal North Shore Hospital. He became the first quadriplegic in Australia to gain an advanced open water diving certificate and a coxwain's certificate.

== Sporting career ==
At the 1981 Para-Quad national Games in Melbourne, he won a gold medal and two silver medals. He won two gold medals and a silver medal at the 1982 FESPIC Games in Hong Kong. At the 1983 International Stoke Mandeville Games he won two gold medals and a bronze medal. He competed at the 1984 New York/Stoke Mandeville Games, where he won three bronze medals in the Men's 100 m Freestyle 1C, Men's 25 m Backstroke 1C and Men's 3×25 m Freestyle Relay 1A–1C events.

== Recognition ==
In 1984, Staddon received the "Best Single Sporting Performance" award from Sport Australia, the NBN Sport Star of the Year Special Award, and the Para-Quad Sporting Federation's "Most Outstanding Swimming Award". He was named "Citizen of the Year" by the Newcastle Australia Day Council in 1987, and was inducted into the Hunter Region Sporting Hall of Fame in 1999.
