= Wayne Lewis (bowls) =

Australian Paralympic lawn bowls player

Personal information
- Nationality: Australian
- Born: 1951/1952
Medal record
Men's lawn bowls
Representing Australia
Paralympic Games
Silver medal – second place	1984 New York/ Stoke Mandeville	Pairs paraplegic

Wayne Lewis (born 1951/1952) is an Australian Paralympic lawn bowler. He became a paraplegic while working on a farm with his father. He was sitting underneath a slasher and changing the blades; the hydraulics broke and the slasher collapsed on him. His father pulled him out, and played a major role in his rehabilitation, encouraging him back into driving tractors on the farm.

After the accident, Lewis taught himself to ski and play lawn bowls. He won a silver medal in the men's lawn bowls pairs with Ken Moran at the 1984 New York/Stoke Mandeville Paralympics.

Lewis and his wife Carol run a 1,600-hectare (4,000-acre) sheep and cattle property and a bed and breakfast lodge called Ruth's House near Tatong in Victoria. He is a Life Member of the Tatong Football Netball Club.
