= Mary-Anne Wallace =

Australian Paralympic swimmer

Personal information
- Nationality: Australia
Medal record
Swimming
Paralympic Games
Gold medal – first place	1984 New York/Stoke Mandeville	Women's 400 m Freestyle B3
Silver medal – second place	1984 New York/Stoke Mandeville	Women's 100 m Butterfly B3
Bronze medal – third place	1984 New York/Stoke Mandeville	Women's 100 m Freestyle B3
Bronze medal – third place	1984 New York/Stoke Mandeville	Women's 200 m Individual Medley B3

Mary-Anne Wallace is an Australian Paralympic swimmer with a vision impairment. At the 1984 New York/Stoke Mandeville Games, she won a gold medal in the Women's 400 m Freestyle B3 event, a silver medal in the Women's 100 m Butterfly B3 event, and two bronze medals in the Women's 100 m Freestyle B3 and Women's 200 m Individual Medley B3 events.
