= Peter Kirby (athlete) =

Australian Paralympic athlete

Personal information
- Nationality: Australian
- Born: 1964/1965
Medal record
Men's para-athletics
Representing Australia
Paralympic Games
Gold medal – first place	1984 New York	4×100 m relay A4–9
Silver medal – second place	1984 New York	4×400 m relay A4–9
Bronze medal – third place	1984 New York	100 m A6
Bronze medal – third place	1984 New York	400 m A6
Bronze medal – third place	1984 New York	Long jump A6

Peter Kirby (born 1964/1965) is an Australian Paralympic arm amputee athlete. He won one gold, one silver and three bronze medals at the 1984 New York Paralympics.

Kirby was born in Bega, New South Wales and was the son of a Wiradjuri father and mother. His family moved around New South Wales during the period of indigenous segregation but finally settled in Eden, New South Wales. At the age of 13, he lost his right hand and forearm when he touched fallen high voltage power lines at Eden sportsground.

Before the accident, he was a top athlete at high school. Kirby has stated that one of his teachers Phil Gould assisted him to adjust his running style to compensate for his amputated right forearm. At the age of 19, he competed at the 1984 Summer Paralympics in New York in five athletics events and won five medals – a gold medal in the Men's 4×100 m Relay A4–9 event, a silver medal in the Men's 4 x 400 m Relay A4–9 event, and three bronze medals in the Men's 100 m A6, Men's 400 m A6 and Men's Long jump A6 events. He was the first indigenous Australian Paralympian to win a gold medal.

After returning from the New York Games, he was presented with a silver tray during half-time at the next first grade rugby league match. The Eden community played a significant role in him going to the Games as they fundraised to meet his travel costs. Kirby competed at the 1985 Australia Games where the relay team from New York Games broke the world record.

Kirby also played Rugby League for the Eden Tigers, Pambula-Merimbula Bulldogs and South Coast United. He also played soccer for over 11 years.
