= Lyn Coleman =

Australian Paralympic sportsperson (1964–2023)

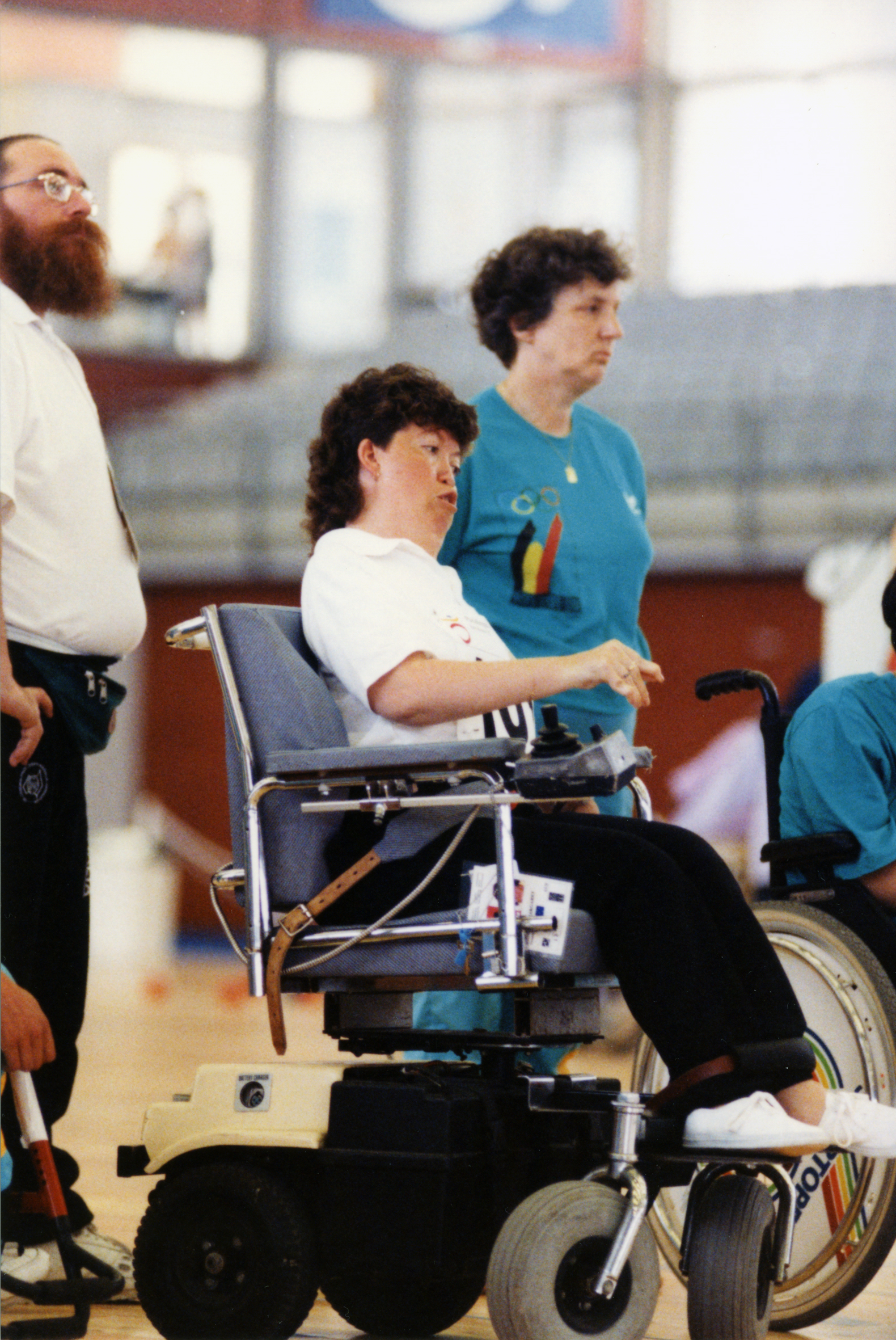
- Coleman at the 1992 Barcelona Paralympics

Personal information
- Nationality: Australia
- Born: 16 September 1964 Brisbane
- Died: 22 May 2023 (aged 58)
Medal record
Athletics
Paralympic Games
Silver medal – second place	1984 New York/Stoke Mandeville	Women's Slalom C1

Lynette Coleman (16 September 1964 – 22 May 2023) was an Australian Paralympic boccia player, athlete and swimmer with cerebral palsy.

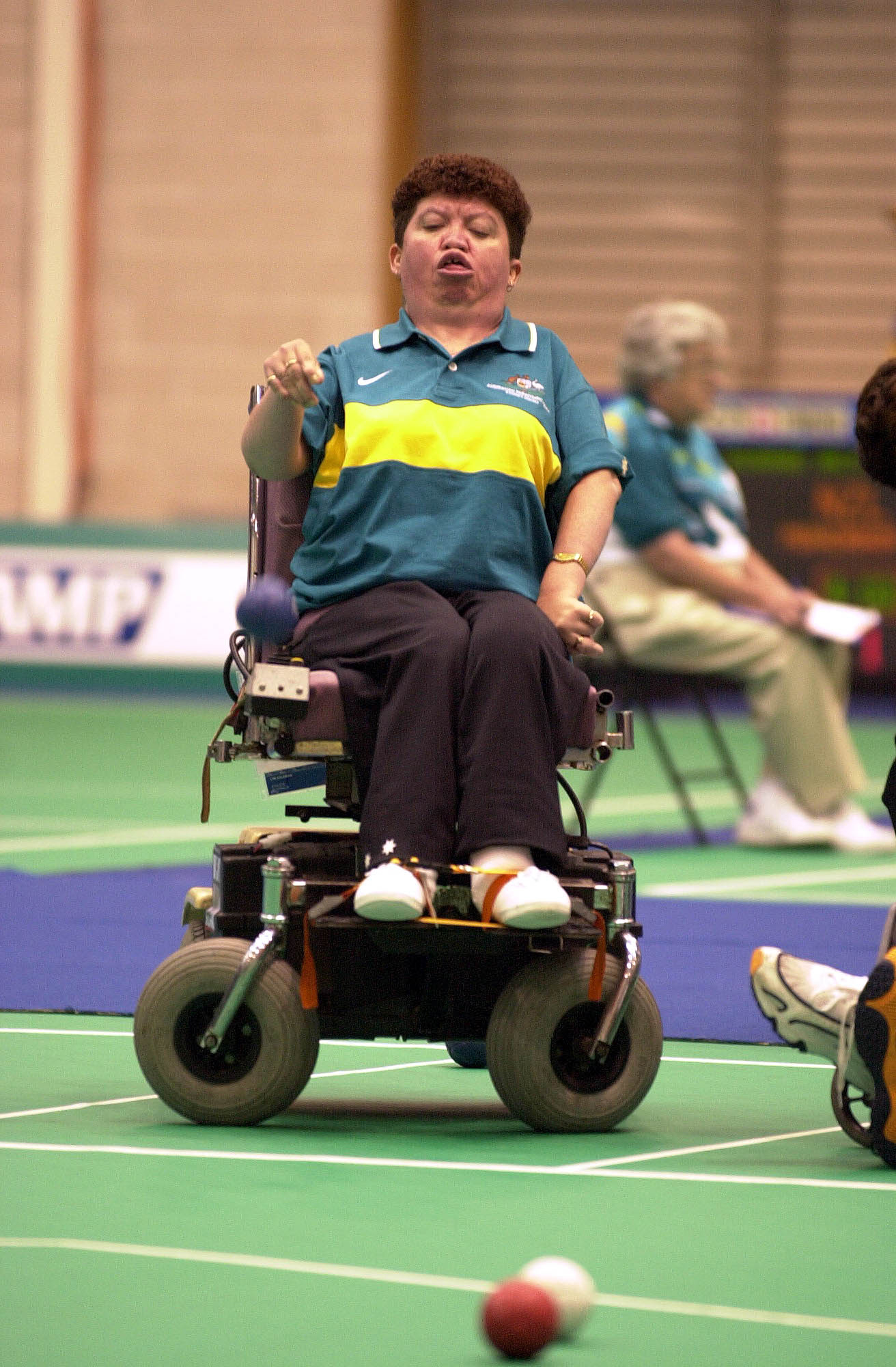
Coleman in action at the 2000 Sydney Paralympics

== Career ==
Coleman was born in Brisbane on 16 September 1964. At the 1984 New York/Stoke Mandeville Paralympics, she won a silver medal in the Women's Slalom C1 event and also competed in swimming . At the 1988 Seoul Paralympics, she competed in athletics and boccia events, and she competed solely in boccia at the 1992 Barcelona, 1996 Atlanta, and 2000 Sydney Paralympics. From 1995 to 2000, her international ranking climbed every year. In 2000, she received an Australian Sports Medal.

In July 2005, she won the BC3 singles and BC3 pairs (with Laura Solomon) and in September of that year, she reached the quarter finals of the BC3 Singles event and was part of the team that came fourth in the BC3 Teams event in the Asia and South Pacific Boccia Championships.

She died on 22 May 2023, aged 58, after an operation.
