= Terry Biggs =

Australian table tennis player

Personal information
- Nationality: Australia
Medal record
Table tennis
Representing Australia
Paralympic Games
Gold medal – first place	1984 New York/Stoke Mandeville	Singles C1

Terry Biggs is an Australian Paralympic table tennis player, athlete, and administrator. At the 1984 New York/Stoke Mandeville Games, he won a gold medal in the men's singles C1 table tennis event against Allen Francis from the United Kingdom, came sixth in the men's slalom C3 event, and came seventh in the men's club throw C3 event, He was one of the first Paralympic gold medallists with cerebral palsy. He was the Director of the Australian Paralympic Federation (now the Australian Paralympic Committee) from 1992 to 1995, and was the President of the Cerebral Palsy Australian Sport & Recreation Federation from 1992 to at least 2000. In 2000, he received an Australian Sports Medal.
