= Michael Morley (athlete) =

Australian Paralympic athlete

Personal information
- Nationality: Australia
Medal record
Athletics
Paralympic Games
Gold medal – first place	1984 New York/Stoke Mandeville	Men's High Jump A6
Bronze medal – third place	1984 New York/Stoke Mandeville	Men's Triple Jump A6

Michael Morley is an Australian Paralympic athlete. At the 1984 New York/Stoke Mandeville Games, he won a gold medal in the Men's High Jump A6 event and a bronze medal in the Men's Triple Jump A6 event.
