= Helena Brunner =

Australian Paralympic swimmer

Helena Brunner OAM
Personal information
- Full name: Helena Martha Brunner
- Nationality: Australia
Medal record
Swimming
Paralympic Games
| Gold medal – first place | 1984 New York/Stoke Mandeville | Women's 100 m Backstroke A4 |
| Gold medal – first place | 1984 New York/Stoke Mandeville | Women's 100 m Freestyle A4 |
| Gold medal – first place | 1984 New York/Stoke Mandeville | Women's 400 m Freestyle A4 |
| Gold medal – first place | 1984 New York/Stoke Mandeville | Women's 4x100 m Freestyle Relay A1–A9 |
| Gold medal – first place | 1984 New York/Stoke Mandeville | Women's 4x100 m Medley Relay A1–A9 |
| Silver medal – second place | 1984 New York/Stoke Mandeville | Women's 200 m Individual Medley A4 |
| Bronze medal – third place | 1984 New York/Stoke Mandeville | Women's 100 m Breaststroke A4 |

Helena Martha Brunner is an Australian swimmer. A right-leg below-the-knee amputee, she won seven medals at the 1984 New York/Stoke Mandeville Games.

== Biography ==
As a teenager, Brunner represented her state of New South Wales in national able-bodied swimming competitions, but she quit swimming at the age of seventeen. She subsequently took up water polo, but withdrew from the sport when she moved to Goulburn to study general primary teaching at the Goulburn College of Advanced Education, due to a lack of heated pools in the area.

In February 1978 at the age of 20, while delivering mail for Australia Post during a break from college, she received severe injuries including a crushed right leg after her motorcycle collided with a taxi. She spent six months at Prince of Wales Hospital overcoming her injuries and undergoing six operations to preserve her leg. After leaving hospital she returned to college, having changed her major from physical education to art, but her injured leg forced her to be reliant on crutches. Nearly two years after the accident, she requested that her right leg be amputated after a traumatic injury when she jumped out of bed during a nightmare. While recovering from the amputation, she was informed by a local amputee sporting association that she could take up competitive swimming again as an amputee.

She competed in her first international event in 1980 in Oida, Japan, breaking a world record in freestyle and winning a gold medal in long jump, in which she had not previously competed. She continued winning medals and breaking records, notably competing at the 1981 International Stoke Mandeville Games and the 1982 FESPIC Games. At the 1984 New York/Stoke Mandeville Paralympics, Brunner won five gold medals in the Women's 100 m Backstroke A4, Women's 100 m Freestyle A4, Women's 400 m Freestyle A4, Women's 4x100 m Freestyle Relay A1–A9, and Women's 4x100 m Individual Medley Relay A1–A9 events, a silver medal in the Women's 200 m Individual Medley A4 event, and a bronze medal in the Women's 100 m Breaststroke A4 event. She broke five world records at the 1984 games and a total of nineteen throughout her career. Her daughter was born eighteen months after the Paralympics. Brunner is also a local visual artist and singer in the Central Coast area.

== Recognition ==
Brunner received a Junior Chamber Australia achievement award in 1981. At the 1985 Australia Day Honours, she received a Medal of the Order of Australia "in recognition of service to the sport of swimming". She presented the floral tributes to medallists in the amputee swimming events at the 2000 Sydney Paralympics. In 2026, she was inducted into the Central Coast Sporting Hall of Fame, having previously been recognised as a Central Coast Sports Star of the Year in 1984. An award at a primary school where she previously taught, Kincumber Public School, is named the Helena Brunner Encouragement Award in her honour.
