= Valerie Woodbridge =

Australian Paralympic athlete

Personal information
- Nationality: Australia
Medal record
Athletics
Paralympic Games
Gold medal – first place	1984 New York/Stoke Mandeville	Women's Long Jump A2
Silver medal – second place	1984 New York/Stoke Mandeville	Women's Discus A2
Bronze medal – third place	1984 New York/Stoke Mandeville	Women's Shot Put A2

Valerie Woodbridge is an Australian Paralympic athlete. At the 1984 New York/Stoke Mandeville Games, she won a gold medal in the Women's Long Jump A2 event, a silver medal in the Women's Discus A2 event, and a bronze medal in the Women's Shot Put A2 event.
