= Kerri-Anne Connor =

Australian Paralympic swimmer

Personal information
- Nationality: Australia
- Born: 3 April 1963 (age 63)
Medal record
Swimming
Paralympic Games
Silver medal – second place	1984 New York/Stoke Mandeville	Women's 100 m Backstroke 4
Silver medal – second place	1984 New York/Stoke Mandeville	Women's 100 m Freestyle 4
Silver medal – second place	1984 New York/Stoke Mandeville	Women's 4x50 m Individual Medley 4
Silver medal – second place	1984 New York/Stoke Mandeville	Women's 50 m Butterfly 4
Bronze medal – third place	1984 New York/Stoke Mandeville	Women's 100 m Breaststroke 4

Kerri-Anne Weston (née Connor) (born 3 April 1963) is an Australian swimmer with paraplegia who won five medals at the 1984 New York/Stoke Mandeville Paralympics.

== Personal ==
Connor was born on 3 April 1963 in the Atherton Tableland, as the eldest of three children. Her father ran a contract drainage company, which her mother, formerly a teacher, worked for. She lived in Townsville until she was ten, when she moved with her parents to the Gold Coast. She won a gold medal in the under 7's 50 m backstroke. She competed in squash, basketball, and synchronised swimming, and became one of the first Australian women to receive a surf-lifesaving bronze Medallion.

On New Year's Eve in 1980, when she was seventeen and had recently graduated high school, she had a bout of transverse myelitis that left her paraplegic. A cyst in her spine that she had removed in 1985 caused her to lose some strength in her arms, and later that year, she had two protruding spinal discs removed; the latter operation restored some muscle function in her lower body. She tried learning to walk again after this operation, but severe nerve root pain forced her to abandon this ambition.

She has been married to Grant since 1986. The couple have four children, three daughters and a son.

== Competitive career ==
Connor began training in swimming for the National Wheelchair Games in 1981, and won five gold medals at her first national competition. Coached by Laurie Lawrence, she went to the 1982 World Wheelchair Games, where she won two gold medals in the 50 m butterfly and 100 m backstroke events (setting a world record in the former race), a silver medal in the 100 m freestyle event and a bronze medal in the 100 m breaststroke event. After she returned she received many awards in both disabled and able-bodied competitions including Sports Australia's Female Athlete of the Year and National Caltex-Berlei Disabled Athlete of the Year, and two awards from the Sporting Wheelies and Disabled Association, Queensland's Sporting Wheelie of the Year and Most Improved Athlete of the Year. She was disappointed by her performance at the 1983 World Wheelchair Games, where she did not win a gold medal.

Before the 1984 New York/Stoke Mandeville Games, she took up the Pritikin Diet to lose weight. The diet caused a vitamin deficiency which put her position in the Paralympic swim team in doubt, and meant that she required constant medical attention at the games. Despite this, she won four silver medals in the Women's 100 m Backstroke 4, Women's 100 m Freestyle 4, Women's 4x50 m Individual Medley 4 and Women's 50 m Butterfly 4 events, and a bronze medal in the Women's 100 m Breaststroke 4 event.

She then retired from swimming and took up wheelchair basketball. No other women were playing the sport in Queensland, so she joined the state men's team. She later played for the Australia women's national wheelchair basketball team, and was planning to be part of the team for the first women's Wheelchair Basketball World Championship in 1990. She then changed her mind after discovering that she was expecting her first child, who was born in May 1989.

== Recognition ==
Connor was named the 1982 Junior Athlete of the Year in the Australian Sport Awards. In 1999 she was Inducted into the Gold Coast Sporting Hall of Fame.
