= Donna Smith (athlete) =

Australian Paralympic athlete and wheelchair basketballer

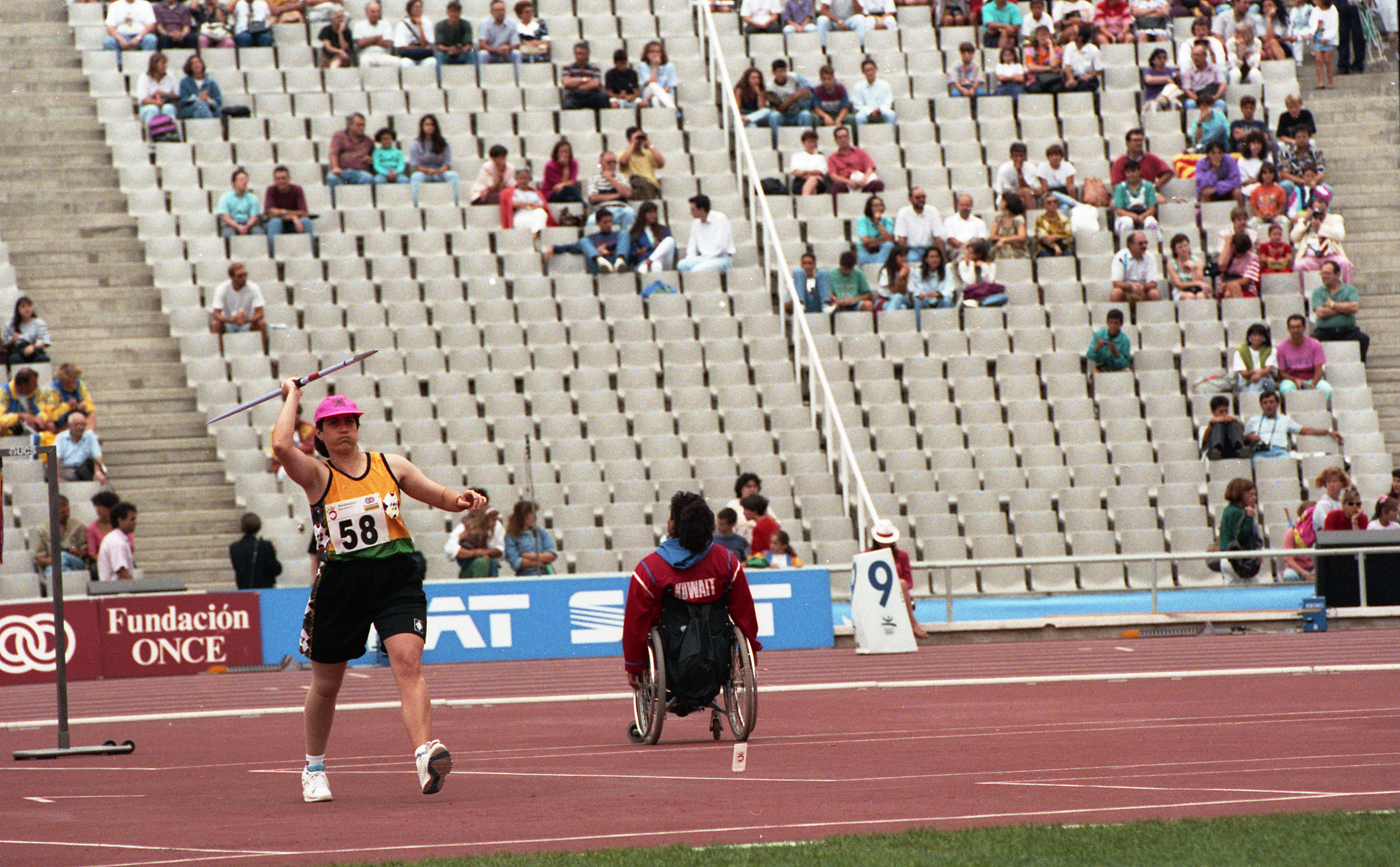
- Donna Smith throwing a Javelin at the 1992 Barcelona Paralympics

Personal information
- Full name: Donna Maree Philp (née Smith)
- Nationality: Australia
- Born: 28 June 1965 Brisbane
- Died: 22 May 1999 (aged 33)
Medal record
Athletics
Paralympic Games
Gold medal – first place	1984 New York/Stoke Mandeville	Women's Javelin A2
Gold medal – first place	1992 Barcelona	Women's Javelin THS2
Silver medal – second place	1984 New York/Stoke Mandeville	Women's Shot Put A2
Silver medal – second place	1988 Seoul	Women's Javelin A6A8A9L6
Silver medal – second place	1992 Barcelona	Women's Shot Put THS2
Bronze medal – third place	1984 New York/Stoke Mandeville	Women's Discus A2

Donna Maree Philp (née Smith), OAM (28 June 1965 – 22 May 1999) was an Australian Paralympic athlete and wheelchair basketballer, who won six medals at four Paralympics.

== Biography ==
Born in Brisbane, Smith was diagnosed with bone cancer at the age of thirteen, and one of her legs was amputated above the knee.

At the 1984 New York/Stoke Mandeville Paralympics, she won a gold medal in the Women's Javelin A2 event, a silver medal in the Women's Shot Put A2 event, and a bronze medal in the Women's Discus A2 event. She won a silver medal at the 1988 Seoul Paralympics in the Women's Javelin A6A8A9L6 event. At the 1992 Barcelona Paralympics, she won a gold medal in the Women's Javelin THS2 event, for which she received a Medal of the Order of Australia, and a silver medal in the Women's Shot Put THS2 event.

She then married Tom Philp, and was part of the Australia women's national wheelchair basketball team at the 1996 Atlanta Paralympics. The couple's son was 10 months old when, while playing wheelchair basketball on 22 May 1999, she died of a heart attack at the age of 33.
