= Michael Desanto =

Australian Paralympic athlete

Personal information
- Nationality: Australia
- Born: 1953 (age 72–73)
Medal record
Athletics
Paralympic Games
Silver medal – second place	1988 Seoul	Men's 4x100 m Relay 1A–1C
Bronze medal – third place	1988 Seoul	Men's 4x200 m Relay 1A–1C

Michael Desanto (born 1953) from Victoria is an Australian Paralympic athlete. He competed without winning any medals at the 1984 New York/Stoke Mandeville Paralympics. At the 1988 Seoul Paralympics, he won a silver medal in the Men's 4x100 m Relay 1A–1C event and a bronze medal in the Men's 4x200 m Relay 1A–1C event.
