= Meredith Evans =

Australian Paralympic swimmer

Personal information
- Nationality: Australia
Medal record
Swimming
Paralympic Games
Silver medal – second place	1984 New York/Stoke Mandeville	Women's 100 m Breaststroke A4
Bronze medal – third place	1984 New York/Stoke Mandeville	Women's 100 m Backstroke A4
Bronze medal – third place	1984 New York/Stoke Mandeville	Women's 100 m Freestyle A4
Bronze medal – third place	1984 New York/Stoke Mandeville	Women's 400 m Freestyle A4
Bronze medal – third place	1984 New York/Stoke Mandeville	Women's 200 m Individual Medley A4

Meredith Evans is an Australian Paralympic swimmer. At the 1984 New York/Stoke Mandeville Paralympics, she won a silver medal in the Women's 100 m Breaststroke A4 event and four bronze medals in the Women's 100 m Backstroke A4, Women's 100 m Freestyle A4, Women's 400 m Freestyle A4, and Women's 200 m Individual Medley A4 events.
