= Craig Blackburn =

Australian Paralympic swimmer

Personal information
- Nationality: Australia
Medal record
Swimming
Paralympic Games
Silver medal – second place	1984 New York/Stoke Mandeville	Men's 100 m Butterfly B3
Silver medal – second place	1984 New York/Stoke Mandeville	Men's 100 m Freestyle B3
Silver medal – second place	1984 New York/Stoke Mandeville	Men's 400 m Freestyle B3

Craig Blackburn is an Australian Paralympic swimmer with a vision impairment. At the 1984 New York/Stoke Mandeville Games, he won three silver medals in the Men's 100 m Butterfly B3, Men's 100 m Freestyle B3, and Men's 400 m Freestyle B3 events.
