= Robert Walden (swimmer) =

Australian Paralympic swimmer

Personal information
- Nationality: Australia
Medal record
Swimming
Paralympic Games
Gold medal – first place	1984 New York/Stoke Mandeville	Men's 25 m Freestyle C6
Gold medal – first place	1984 New York/Stoke Mandeville	Men's 50 m Freestyle C6
Gold medal – first place	1984 New York/Stoke Mandeville	Men's 100 m Freestyle C6
Gold medal – first place	1984 New York/Stoke Mandeville	Men's 200 m Freestyle C6

Robert Walden is an Australian Paralympic swimmer. At the 1984 New York/Stoke Mandeville Games, he won four gold medals in the Men's 25 m Freestyle C6, Men's 50 m Freestyle C6, Men's 100 m Freestyle C6 and Men's 200 m Freestyle C6 events. He also participated without winning any medals at the 1988 Seoul Games.
