= Joe Egan (Paralympian) =

Australian athlete and volleyball player

Joseph Egan
Personal information
- Full name: Joseph Stephen Egan
- Nationality: Australia
- Born: 31 October 1953 (age 72)
Medal record
Athletics
Paralympic Games
Gold medal – first place	1984 New York	Men’s 4×100 m relay A4–9
Silver medal – second place	1984 New York	Men’s 4×400 m relay A4–9
Bronze medal – third place	1980 Arnhem	Men's 100 m C
Bronze medal – third place	1980 Arnhem	Men's 400 m C
Bronze medal – third place	1984 New York	Men's 100 m A4

Joseph Stephen Egan (born 31 October 1953) is an Australian athlete and volleyball player, who has won five medals at four Paralympics from 1980 to 2000.

== Personal ==
Egan was born on 31 October 1953. He was a keen sportsman during his youth, competing in sprinting, hurdling, and both rugby union and rugby league, the latter for South Sydney. His right leg was amputated below the knee after a 1971 motorcycle accident.

In 1999 he founded Dynamicaxtion (later named ProsMedix), a company based on the New South Wales Central Coast that makes prosthetic limbs. He has a patent for a "Method of construction of moulded products" with Wong Cheng-Hing.

== Career ==
Egan was the captain of the Australian team at the 1980 Arnhem Paralympics, where he won two bronze medals in the Men's 100 m C and Men's 400 m C events. At the 1984 New York Games, he won a gold medal in the men's 4×100 m relay A4–9 event, a silver medal in the men's 4×400 m relay A4–9 event, and a bronze medal in the Men's 100 m A4 event. In 1984 he became the first person to remove the flesh-coloured covering from his prosthetic leg to improve its performance in competition. He competed in athletics at the 1988 Seoul Paralympics, after which he retired from competition. In a 2000 interview, he said: "That was it. Finished. I'd had enough. ``I had a young family, and then there were the costs of travelling. You had to pay your way everywhere."

Inspired by the prospect of the upcoming 2000 Sydney Paralympics, he began training again in 1996. However, he could no longer compete at an elite level in athletics, so he started playing volleyball, initially in sitting volleyball. He then recruited and participated in Australia's Paralympic standing volleyball team for the 2000 games.
