= John Newton (bowls player) =

Australian Paralympic athlete

Personal information
- Nationality: Australia
Medal record
Lawn bowls
Paralympic Games
Bronze medal – third place	1984 New York/Stoke Mandeville	Men's singles A6–8
Snooker
Paralympic Games
Bronze medal – third place	1968 Tel Aviv	Men's Open

John Newton is a Paralympic athlete from Australia. He competed in Wheelchair Fencing, Snooker and Table Tennis at the 1968 Tel Aviv Paralympics, winning a bronze medal in Snooker, after losing in the semi-final to the eventual gold medalist, Michael Shelton, of Great Britain. At the 1984 New York/Stoke Mandeville Paralympics he competed in Lawn Bowls, winning a bronze medal in the men's singles A6/8 event.
