= Margaret Murphy (Paralympian) =

Australian Paralympic athlete

Personal information
- Nationality: Australia

Sport
- Sport: Para-athletics, Goalball
Medal record
Women's para-athletics
Representing Australia
Paralympic Games
Silver medal – second place	1984 New York/Stoke Mandeville	High Jump B2
Bronze medal – third place	1984 New York/Stoke Mandeville	Long Jump B2

Margaret Booth (née Murphy) is an Australian vision-impaired Paralympic Games athletics and goalball competitor.

== Personal life ==
Murphy was diagnosed with the genetic eye condition, retinitis pigmentosa, when she was just four-years-old; the same eye condition as her mother. During her high school years her sight began to deteriorate rapidly and she was enrolled into the Royal Institute for Deaf and Blind Children. After learning how to use a white cane through a program tailored by a Guide Dogs orientation and mobility specialist, she received her first guide dog, Matilda, in 1989. After finishing school, she undertook a secretarial course at TAFE before working for the Commonwealth Bank for nine years. During her career she taught people how to use computers. In 2016 Murphy was appointed as a Guide Dogs NSW/ACT public relations speaker.

== Sporting career ==
At the 1984 New York/Stoke Mandeville Paralympics as a classified B2 athlete in the women's 100 m, 400 m, shot put, long jump and high jump. Miurphy won two medals: a silver medal in the women's high jump B2 event and a bronze in the women's long jump B2 event.

As Margaret Booth, she competed at the Seoul 1988 Summer Paralympics in goalball.
