= Keith Zotti =

Australian Paralympic lawn bowler

Personal information
- Nationality: Australia
Medal record
Lawn bowls
Paralympic Games
Bronze medal – third place	1984 New York/Stoke Mandeville	Men's Pairs A2/4

Keith Zotti is a Paralympic lawn bowler from Australia. He competed at the 1984 New York/Stoke Mandeville Paralympics winning a bronze medal in the Men's Pairs A2/4 event.
