= Malcom Chalmers =

Australian Paralympic swimmer

Personal information
- Nationality: Australia
Medal record
Swimming
Paralympic Games
Gold medal – first place	1984 New York/Stoke Mandeville	Men's 100 m Freestyle L6
Silver medal – second place	1984 New York/Stoke Mandeville	Men's 100 m Butterfly L6
Bronze medal – third place	1984 New York/Stoke Mandeville	Men's 100 m Breaststroke L6
Bronze medal – third place	1984 New York/Stoke Mandeville	Men's 200 m Individual Medley L6

Malcom Chalmers is an Australian Paralympic swimmer. At the 1984 New York/Stoke Mandeville Games, he won a gold medal in the Men's 100 m Freestyle L6 event, a silver medal in the Men's 100 m Butterfly L6 event, and two bronze medals in the Men's 100 m Breaststroke L6 and Men's 200 m Individual Medley L6 events.
