= David Griffin (swimmer) =

Australian Paralympic swimmer

Personal information
- Nationality: Australia
- Born: 1967 (age 58–59) Kempsey, New South Wales
Medal record
Swimming
Paralympic Games
Bronze medal – third place	1984 New York	Men's 100 m Butterfly A2
Bronze medal – third place	1988 Seoul	Men's 100 m Butterfly A2
Bronze medal – third place	1988 Seoul	Men's 100 m Freestyle A2

David Griffin (born 1967 in Kempsey, New South Wales) is an Australian swimmer. He lost his right leg above the knee in a tractor accident when he was 11 years of age. At the age of 15 he was noticed by a local swim coach Roger Whitmore and began training in earnest for the NSW Amputee championships.

David competed in the 1984 Games for the Disabled in New York where he won a bronze medal in the 100 m butterfly. At the 1988 Seoul Paralympics he won bronze medals in both the 100 m butterfly and freestyle events.
