= Brett Holcombe =

Australian Paralympic athlete

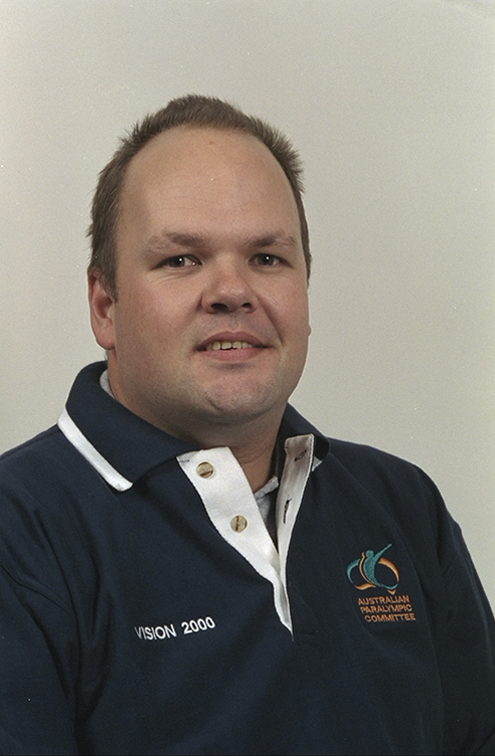
- 2000 Australian Paralympic team portrait of Holcombe

Personal information
- Nationality: Australia
Medal record
Athletics
Paralympic Games
Gold medal – first place	1984 New York/Stoke Mandeville	Men's Long Jump A6
Gold medal – first place	1984 New York/Stoke Mandeville	Men's Triple Jump A6
Gold medal – first place	1984 New York/Stoke Mandeville	Men's 4×100 m relay A4–9
Silver medal – second place	1984 New York/Stoke Mandeville	Men's High Jump A6

Brett Holcombe is an Australian Paralympic amputee athlete. At the 1984 New York/Stoke Mandeville Games, he won three gold medals in the Men's Long Jump A6, Men's Triple Jump A6, and Men's 4×100 m relay A4–9 events and a silver medal in the Men's High Jump A6 event. He also participated in the Australian men's standing volleyball team at the 2000 Sydney Games.
