= Kerrie Engel =

Australian swimmer

Personal information
- Nationality: Australia
- Born: 1966 (age 59–60) Melbourne
Medal record
Swimming
Paralympic Games
Bronze medal – third place	1984 New York/Stoke Mandeville	Women's 400 m Freestyle 5
FESPIC Games
Gold medal – first place	1982 Hong Kong	100 m Freestyle 5
Gold medal – first place	1982 Hong Kong	4 x 100 m Freestyle Relay
Gold medal – first place	1994 Beijing	100 m Freestyle 5
Gold medal – first place	1994 Beijing	400 m Freestyle 5
Silver medal – second place	1982 Hong Kong	200 m Freestyle 5
Silver medal – second place	1994 Beijing	100 m Backstroke 5
Bronze medal – third place	1982 Hong Kong	100 m Backstroke 5

Kerrie Duff (née Engel) (born 1966) is an Australian swimmer and Paralympic bronze medalist.

== Early life ==
Born in Melbourne with spina bifida, Engel attended Nepean Special School until the end of grade 2, at the age of seven. She then moved to the local primary school at Brandon Park Primary School in 1972 before moving to Brentwood Secondary College. In year 9 she transferred to Korowa Anglican Girls' School.

== Competitive career ==
In 1981, Engel was one of four Victorians chosen to compete in the First Invitational Junior Games at Newcastle upon Tyne, UK. The other juniors were Peta Jayne Goodwin, Rodney Young and Paul Stitt. When Engel returned to Australia, she had won many medals in swimming events and also track and field.

After that, she competed in the Melbourne Senior Nationals and began training a lot more after school. She was coached in swimming at North Lodge Swimming academy under June O'Doherty ('Mrs Boss') and track and field training was overseen by one of the senior Paravics athletes, Ivan Rasojovic.

While studying in year 10 she was selected to compete in the FESPIC Games in Sha Tin, Hong Kong. She continued to train at Northlodge during the same era as Greg Fasala who was trained by Jim O'Doherty ('Boss') so the pool deck often held cheering kids watching both overseas athletes do time trials. Two PE teacher students, Paul and Tim Hannon, were the track coaches. At the same time she was coached at Monash University's pool by the Paravics coaches, Greg Frost and then Brian where she met fellow wheelchair sports athletes. Engel swam at the same meet as Fasala when the First Australia Day Games occurred in Melbourne and remembers walking in the parade at the Glass House alongside the 'Mean Machine'.

She swam personal bests in freestyle and backstroke (100 m and 100 m) as well as track events, winning bronze and silver medals in swimming at FESPIC Games. Dawn Fraser was the team motivator and Engel recalls the Australian swimmer leading the 'Aussie, Aussie, Aussie' chant in the arena as the team made its entrance. Throughout her career, Engel competed in class 5, though she was borderline class 4, which was apparent when she swam against Sue at the border class between Victoria and South Australia in a few Mount Gambier competitions.

The highlight of Engel's swimming career was representing Australia at the 1984 Summer Paralympics. She won bronze in the 400 m Freestyle event in a personal best time of 7.11 in Class 5.

As a result of this, she represented students on Monash University's Sports And Recreation Association Executive between 1984 and 1989 whilst undertaking her Bachelor of Arts. She was awarded a Full Blue in 1984 and inducted into the Monash University Hall of Fame in 2005. Overall Engel competed in four Senior National Games in the years 1981, 1984, 1986 and 1988.

== After the Paralympics ==
Engel received special permission to join Northlodge A.U.S.S.I. when she was 23 although people generally needed to be over 30 to swim in MASTERS. She swam in a number of short and long meets with the Northlodge Neptune team.

Engel also had fun sharing her swimming skills by training Paravics' juniors, and playing a little bit of wheelchair tennis (in Frankston) and basketball (at Preston) but was happier in the pool. Her team contained other notable Paralympic swimmers such as Anne Currie, who was also in the 1984 Paralympics, but competed on Long Island.

Although born with spina bifida, Engel swam against other athletes with paralysis and spinal injuries such as polio and cerebral palsy. She was team captain in the Perth Nationals.

In 1991, Engel received a Bachelor of Arts from Monash University. She returned to competitive swimming in 1994 while working at World Vision Australia to swim in Beijing's FESPIC Games and was pleased with swimming comparative and faster times to her 1983 personal best. She came away with two gold and one silver.

In 1999, she co-wrote the book Challenge and Hope: Disability, Disease and Trauma in the Developing World with Jill Burn.

Engel is married and lives in Western Australia. In 2014 she graduated with a Masters in Human Rights from Curtin University.She gained her Cert IV TAE and runs Kerrie Duff Consulting . In her spare time Engel enjoys sharing her life experiences at community events such as 2016 Anti Poverty Week or 2017 TedxPerth as a Living Book through The Human Library project.
