= Tracey Lewis =

Australian Paralympic swimmer

Personal information
- Nationality: Australian
Medal record
Women's swimming
Representing Australia
Paralympic Games
Silver medal – second place	1984 New York/ Stoke Mandeville	100 m Backstroke A8
Silver medal – second place	1984 New York/ Stoke Mandeville	100 m Freestyle A8
Silver medal – second place	1984 New York/ Stoke Mandeville	100 m Butterfly A8
Bronze medal – third place	1984 New York/ Stoke Mandeville	200 m Individual Medley A8

Tracey Lewis is an Australian Paralympic amputee swimmer.

== Career ==
She was born in Gympie, Queensland. At the 1984 New York/Stoke Mandeville Games, she competed in five events. She won three silver medals in the Women's 100 m Backstroke A8, Women's 100 m Butterfly A8, and Women's 100 m Freestyle A8 events and a bronze medal in the Women's 200 m Individual Medley A8 event. Her performances resulted in her being awarded the 1984 Queensland Sportsman of the Year.
