= Greg Hammond =

Australian Paralympic swimmer

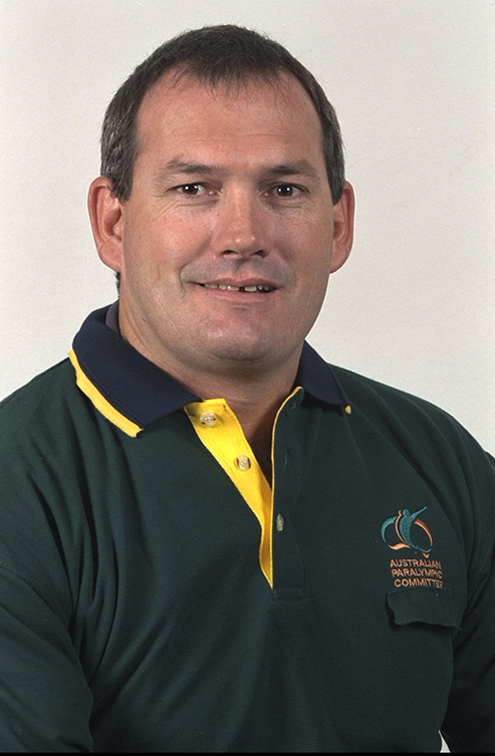
- 2000 Australian Paralympic team portrait of Hammond

Personal information
- Full name: Gregory John Hammond
- Nationality: Australia
- Born: 10 May 1967 (age 59)
- Height: 1.96 m (6 ft 5 in)
Medal record
Swimming
Paralympic Games
Gold medal – first place	1984 New York/Stoke Mandeville	Men's 100 m Breaststroke A8
Gold medal – first place	1984 New York/Stoke Mandeville	Men's 100 m Freestyle A8
Gold medal – first place	1984 New York/Stoke Mandeville	Men's 4x100 m Medley Relay A1–A9
Gold medal – first place	1988 Seoul	Men's 100 m Breaststroke A8
Gold medal – first place	1988 Seoul	Men's 100 m Freestyle A8
Silver medal – second place	1984 New York/Stoke Mandeville	Men's 100 m Butterfly A8
Silver medal – second place	1984 New York/Stoke Mandeville	Men's 200 m Individual Medley A8
Silver medal – second place	1984 New York/Stoke Mandeville	Men's 4x100 m Freestyle Relay A1–A9
Silver medal – second place	1988 Seoul	Men's 4x50 m Freestyle Relay A1–A8

Gregory John Hammond , OAM (born 10 May 1967) is an Australian Paralympic swimmer who also competed at an international level in sailing and volleyball.

== Personal ==
Hammond was born on 10 May 1967 in Sydney, with a shortened right forearm. While growing up around Manly, one of his favourite sports was sailing. As of 2000, he had two children, and was working as a mechanical engineer.

== Career ==
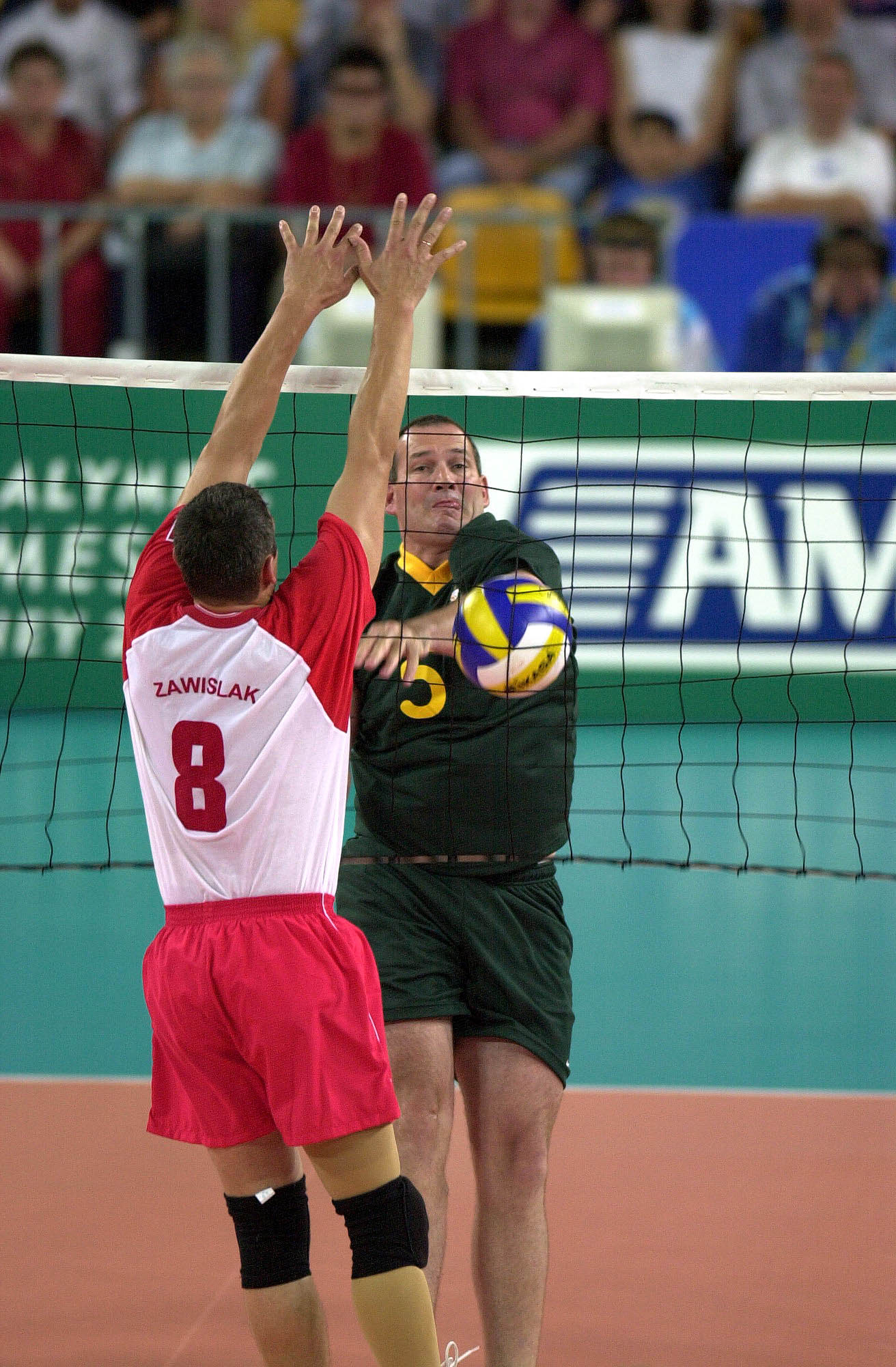
Hammond (right) at the net during 2000 Summer Paralympics standing volleyball match

At the 1984 New York/Stoke Mandeville Paralympics, Hammond won three gold medals in the Men's 100 m Breaststroke A8, Men's 100 m Freestyle A8, and Men's 4x100 m Medley Relay A1–A9 events, and three silver medals in the Men's 100 m Butterfly A8, Men's 200 m Individual Medley A8, and Men's 4x100 m Freestyle Relay A1–A9 events. At the 1988 Seoul Paralympics, he won two gold medals in the Men's 100 m Breaststroke A8 and Men's 100 m Freestyle A8 events, and a silver medal in the Men's 4x50 m Freestyle Relay A1–A8 event. During his swimming career, he was coached by Peter Ryan and Harry Gallagher.

He gave up swimming after the 1988 Summer Paralympics because he had achieved all his goals in that sport, and concentrated on sailing. He was part of a Sonar team that was aiming to participate in the 1996 Atlanta Paralympics, but it did not qualify because it came ninth in a pre-games regatta in Florida. His crew then prepared to sail at the 2000 Sydney Paralympics, but in November 1999, one of the members quit due to business reasons. An old friend then invited him to participate in the volleyball campaign, and he became part of the men's "standing" team, where his height of 1.96 metres (6 ft 5 in) gave him a distinct advantage.

== Recognition ==
In 2007, Hammond was inducted into the Northern Beaches Sporting Hall of Fame. In 2010, he received a Medal of the Order of Australia "For service to sport, particularly through achievements as a paralympian".
