= Mark Davies (athlete) =

Australian Paralympic athlete

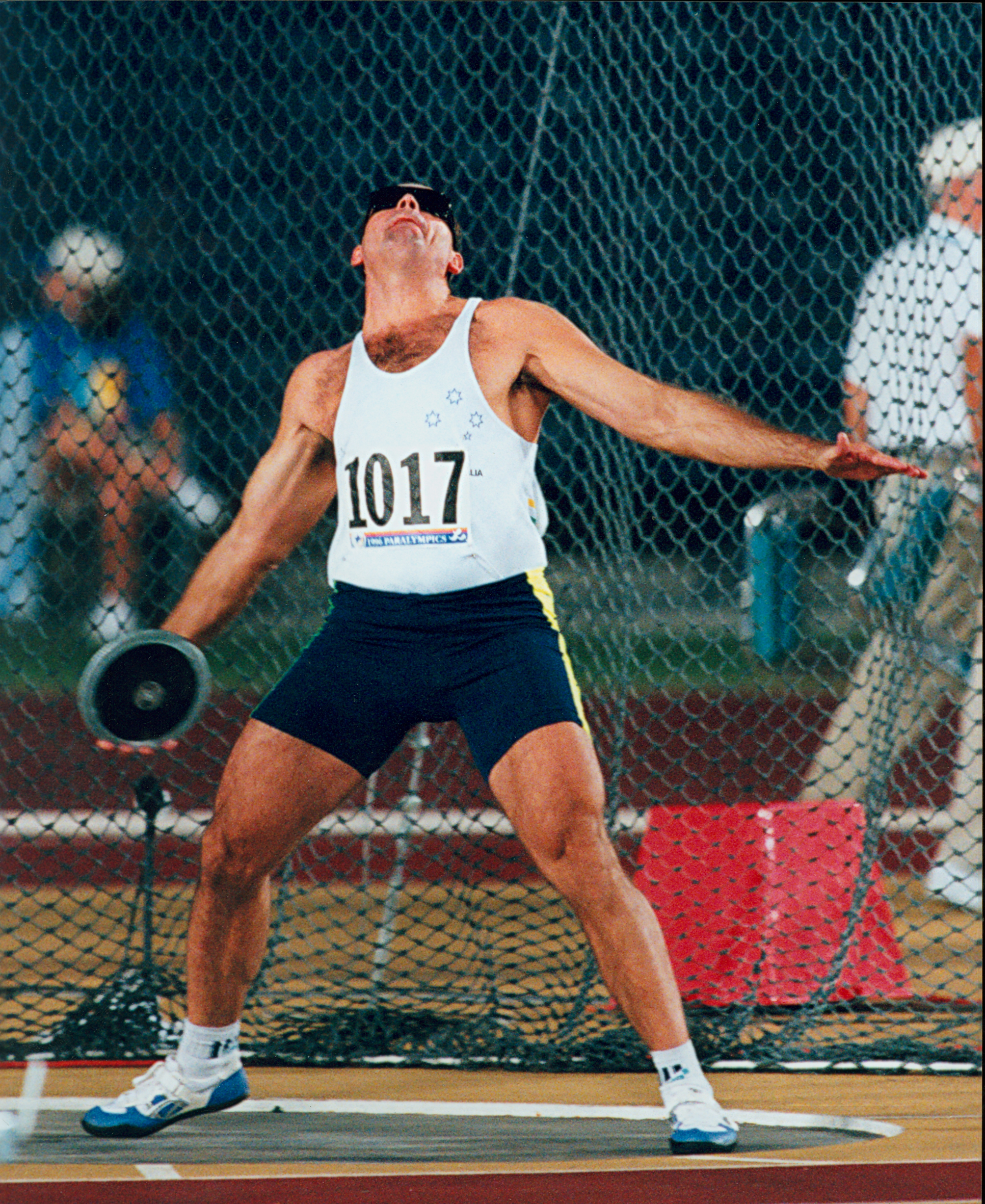
- Davies at the Atlanta Paralympics in 1996

Personal information
- Full name: Mark Hedley Davies
- Nationality: Australia
- Born: 30 June 1960 Darwin, Northern Territory
- Died: 9 January 2011 (aged 50) Darwin, Northern Territory
Medal record
Men's athletics
Paralympic Games
Gold medal – first place	1984 New York/Stoke Mandeville	Men's 100 m B2
Gold medal – first place	1984 New York/Stoke Mandeville	Men's Pentathlon B2
IPC Athletics World Championships
Bronze medal – third place	1998 Birmingham	Men's Discus F11

Mark Hedley Davies (30 June 1960 – 9 January 2011) was an Australian Paralympic athlete. He was born in Darwin, and was the first man to represent the Northern Territory in sport for the blind. He had a degenerative eye condition that caused tunnel vision; he found it more difficult to compete in able-bodied sports as he got older, and by 2000, he had lost all of his sight.

He began his athletic career before the establishment of the Northern Territory Institute of Sport, so he had to organise all his training and transport independently. In 1982 he joined the newly formed Northern Territory Blind Sports Association, and went on to win many medals and break Australian records at national blind sporting championships. At the 1984 New York/Stoke Mandeville Paralympics, he won gold medals in the Men's Pentathlon B2, where he broke a world record, and the Men's 100 m B2. He also competed in athletics without winning any medals at the 1988 Seoul, 1992 Barcelona, 1996 Atlanta, and 2000 Sydney Games. He worked as an athletics coach, and assisted other blind sportspeople in the Northern Territory. In 2000, he received an Australian Sports Medal.

He died in Darwin on 9 January 2011, a week after the death of his wife. The Australian Paralympic Committee described him as "a genuine pioneer of the Australian Paralympic movement".
