= Meredith Jones (athlete) =

Australian Paralympic athlete

Personal information
- Nationality: Australia
Medal record
Athletics
Paralympic Games
Silver medal – second place	1988 Seoul	Women's 4x400 m Relay 2–6

Meredith Jones is an Australian Paralympic athlete. She participated in athletics in the 1984 New York/Stoke Mandeville Games and won a silver medal at the 1988 Seoul Games in the Women's 4x400 m Relay 2–6 event.
