= Rosemary Eames =

Australian Paralympic swimmer

Personal information
- Full name: Rosemary Clare Elliott (née Eames)
- Nationality: Australia
- Born: 1965
- Died: 2002 (age 36) Brisbane
Medal record
Swimming
Paralympic Games
Gold medal – first place	1984 New York/Stoke Mandeville	Women's 100 m Breaststroke A6
Silver medal – second place	1984 New York/Stoke Mandeville	Women's 100 m Backstroke A6
Silver medal – second place	1984 New York/Stoke Mandeville	Women's 100 m Butterfly A6
Silver medal – second place	1984 New York/Stoke Mandeville	Women's 100 m Freestyle A6
Silver medal – second place	1984 New York/Stoke Mandeville	Women's 200 m Individual Medley A6

Rosemary Clare Elliott (née Eames) (1965–2002) was an Australian swimmer with one arm. She won six medals at the 1984 Summer Paralympics and broke many world records in swimming.

== Personal ==
Eames was raised in the Sydney suburb of Kingsgrove. At the age of five, she fell off a slide and damaged a bone in her left wrist while holidaying in Batemans Bay. Her left arm was plastered, but it developed gas gangrene and had to be amputated a few weeks later. After her recovery, she resumed gymnastics due to the encouragement of her parents, and took up jazz ballet, impressing the local community so much that she received a Canterbury Council Centenary Medal for Achievement.

When she began swimming soon after the accident, she was only taught sidestroke because her swimming teachers thought that it was the only stroke that could be performed by a person with one arm. However, she met a swimming teacher with one arm in North Ryde who showed her how to swim the other strokes by example. She entered school competitions with her able-bodied peers, then progressed to district competitions, where she was constantly disqualified from breaststroke and butterfly races because she did not finish with two hands. In 1985, at the age of 20, she was working as an accounting machine operator for the New South Wales state government. She played an active role in the New South Wales Amputee Sports Association, often serving as their spokesperson. She married Paul Elliott in 1988 and had three children with him, Chloe, Nathan and Alexa; the family moved to Brisbane in 1999, where Eames worked at Qantas. She died in a car accident in 2002 at the age of 36.

== Career ==
Eames began competitive swimming at the age of 14. At the 1982 FESPIC Games, she won four gold medals and broke four world records. At the 1984 New York/Stoke Mandeville Paralympics, she won two gold medals, one of which was in the Women's 100 m Breaststroke A6 event, and four silver medals in the Women's 100 m Backstroke A6, Women's 100 m Butterfly A6, Women's 100 m Freestyle A6 and Women's 200 m Individual Medley A6 events; she broke two world and Paralympic records at the games. At the 1985 Canadian National Games for the Physically Disabled, she won gold medals in the 100 m freestyle, backstroke, breaststroke, and butterfly, and the 200 m individual medley; she broke world records in the freestyle, backstroke, and breaststroke events. She won five gold medals and broke two world records at the 1986 FESPIC Games.

In total, she broke more than 20 world records and 2 Paralympic records in her career. She won 10 gold medals and 4 silver medals in international events.

== Recognition ==
In 1986, Eames received the Portfolio Magazine Independent Woman of the Year Award for Sport for her work with the New South Wales Amputee Sports Association. She was made a life member of the Hurstville Amateur Swimming Club, and in 2000, she received an Australian Sports Medal.
