= Therese Donovan =

Australian Paralympic swimmer

Personal information
- Nationality: Australia
Medal record
Swimming
Paralympic Games
Silver medal – second place	1984 New York/Stoke Mandeville	Women's 100 m Breaststroke B2
Silver medal – second place	1984 New York/Stoke Mandeville	Women's 100 m Freestyle B2
Silver medal – second place	1984 New York/Stoke Mandeville	Women's 400 m Freestyle B2
Bronze medal – third place	1984 New York/Stoke Mandeville	Women's 100 m Backstroke B2
Bronze medal – third place	1984 New York/Stoke Mandeville	Women's 200 m Individual Medley B2

Therese Donovan is an Australian Paralympic swimmer with a vision impairment. At the 1984 New York/Stoke Mandeville Games, she won three silver medals in the Women's 100 m Breaststroke B2, Women's 100 m Freestyle B2 and Women's 400 m Freestyle B2 events, and two bronze medals in the Women's 100 m Backstroke B2 and Women's 200 m Individual Medley B2 events.
