= Alan Dufty =

Australian Paralympic athlete

Personal information
- Full name: Alan Rex Dufty
- Nationality: Australia
- Born: 1947 (age 78–79)
Medal record
Athletics
Paralympic Games
| Gold medal – first place | 1984 New York/Stoke Mandeville | Men's 400 m 1C |
| Gold medal – first place | 1984 New York/Stoke Mandeville | Men's Marathon 1C |
| Silver medal – second place | 1984 New York/Stoke Mandeville | Men's 200 m 1C |
| Silver medal – second place | 1984 New York/Stoke Mandeville | Men's 4x200 m Relay 1A–1C |
| Silver medal – second place | 1988 Seoul | Men's 4x100 m Relay 1A–1C |
| Silver medal – second place | 1988 Seoul | Men's Marathon 1C |
| Silver medal – second place | 1992 Barcelona | Men's 4x100 m Relay TW1–2 |
| Bronze medal – third place | 1984 New York/Stoke Mandeville | Men's 800 m 1C |
| Bronze medal – third place | 1984 New York/Stoke Mandeville | Men's 4x100 m Relay 1A–1C |
| Bronze medal – third place | 1988 Seoul | Men's 1,500 m 1C |
| Bronze medal – third place | 1988 Seoul | Men's 4x200 m Relay 1A–1C |
| Bronze medal – third place | 1992 Barcelona | Men's 4x400 m Relay TW1–2 |

Alan Rex Dufty (born 1947) is an Australian Paralympic athlete who won twelve medals at three Paralympics from 1984 to 1992.

== Personal ==
Born in the Riverina region of New South Wales, Dufty moved to the Queensland town of Proserpine, to be with his wife, Olga, whom he married in 1970. He competed in rugby league, rugby union, and amateur boxing while living in New South Wales. In August 1973, he broke his back and became paraplegic after a motorcycle accident. He worked for the Shire of Proserpine from 1975 to 2003, at first as a parking inspector. He has served on the committees of many organisations related to disability and sport. In 2003, he won a by-election to select a councillor of the Whitsunday Shire Council after the previous holder of that position died suddenly, and he served out the remainder of her term. He and his family were the subject of a 1981 documentary that aired throughout Australia.

== Competitive career ==
Dufty competed in wheelchair sport from 1976 to 1996. At the 1984 New York/Stoke-Mandeville Paralympics, he won two gold medals in the Men's 400 m 1C and Men's Marathon 1C events, two silver medals in the Men's 200 m 1C and Men's 4x200 m Relay 1A–1C events, and two bronze medals in the Men's 800 m 1C and Men's 4x100 m Relay 1A–1C events.

At the 1988 Seoul Games, he won two silver medals in the Men's 4x100 m Relay 1A–1C and Men's Marathon 1C events and two bronze medals in the Men's 1,500 m 1C and Men's 4x200 m Relay 1A–1C events. At the 1992 Barcelona Games, he won a silver medal in the Men's 4x100 m Relay TW1–2 event and a bronze medal in the Men's 4x400 m Relay TW1–2 event.
