= Wayne Ryding =

English Paralympic swimmer

Personal information
- Nationality: United Kingdom
- Born: Wigan, United Kingdom
Medal record
Swimming
Paralympic Games
Gold medal – first place	1984 New York/Stoke Mandeville	Men's 100 Freestyle 5
Silver medal – second place	1984 New York/Stoke Mandeville	Men's 400 Freestyle 5
Bronze medal – third place	1988 Seoul	Men's 400 Freestyle 5
Bronze medal – third place	2000 Sydney	Men's 100 m Breaststroke SB6
World Championships and Games for the Disabled
Bronze medal – third place	1990 Assen	Men's 200m Freestyle S8
Bronze medal – third place	1990 Assen	Men's 400m Freestyle S8
Bronze medal – third place	1990 Assen	Men's 4 x 100m Freestyle S7

Wayne Ryding is an English Paralympic swimmer, who was born in Wigan and initially competed for Australia. At the 1984 New York/Stoke Mandeville Paralympics, he won a gold medal in the Men's 100 m Freestyle 5 event, in which he set a new world record, and a silver medal in the Men's 400 m Freestyle 5 event. At the 1988 Seoul Paralympics, he won a bronze medal in the Men's 400 m Freestyle 5 event. He then married an Englishwoman and moved to England. He represented England at the 1994 Victoria Commonwealth Games, and represented Great Britain at both the 1996 Atlanta and 2000 Sydney Paralympics; he won a bronze medal at the 2000 games in the Men's 100 m Breaststroke SB6 event.
