= Gary Gudgeon =

Australian Paralympic swimmer

Personal information
- Nationality: Australia
Medal record
Swimming
Paralympic Games
Gold medal – first place	1980 Arnhem	Men's 400 m Freestyle C–D
Gold medal – first place	1984 New York/Stoke Mandeville	Men's 100 m Breaststroke A4
Gold medal – first place	1984 New York/Stoke Mandeville	Men's 100 m Butterfly A4
Gold medal – first place	1984 New York/Stoke Mandeville	Men's 200 m Individual Medley A4
Gold medal – first place	1984 New York/Stoke Mandeville	Men's 400 m Freestyle A4
Silver medal – second place	1980 Arnhem	Men's 100 m Backstroke C–D
Silver medal – second place	1980 Arnhem	Men's 4x50 m Individual Medley C
Silver medal – second place	1984 New York/Stoke Mandeville	Men's 100 m Backstroke A4
Bronze medal – third place	1980 Arnhem	Men's 100 m Freestyle C–D

Gary Gudgeon is an Australian Paralympic swimmer. At the 1980 Arnhem Games, he won a gold medal in the Men's 400 m Freestyle C–D event, two silver medals in the Men's 100 m Backstroke C–D and Men's 4x50 m Individual Medley C events, and a bronze medal in the Men's 100 m Freestyle C–D event. At the 1984 New York/Stoke Mandeville Games, he won four gold medals in the Men's 100 m Breaststroke A4, Men's 100 m Butterfly A4, Men's 200 m Individual Medley A4 and Men's 400 m Freestyle A4 events, and a silver medal in the Men's 100 m Backstroke A4 event.
