= Phillip Tracey =

Australian paralympic swimmer (born 1963/4)

Personal information
- Full name: Phillip John Tracey
- Nationality: Australian
- Born: 1963 or 1964 (age 61–62)
Medal record
Men's swimming
Representing Australia
Paralympic Games
Silver medal – second place	1988 Seoul	25 m backstroke 1A
Silver medal – second place	1988 Seoul	50 m freestyle 1A
Silver medal – second place	1988 Seoul	100 m freestyle 1A
Bronze medal – third place	1984 New York/ Stoke Mandeville	100 m freestyle 1A

Phillip John Tracey (born 1963 or 1964) is a quadriplegic Australian Paralympic swimmer. At the 1984 New York/Stoke Mandeville Paralympics, he won a bronze medal in the Men's 100 m Freestyle 1A event. He won three silver medals at the 1988 Seoul Games in the Men's 100 m Freestyle 1A, Men's 25 m Backstroke 1A and Men's 50 m Freestyle 1A events. He competed in swimming without winning a medal at the 1992 Barcelona Paralympics. He was from Murrumbeena, Victoria and 34 at the time of the Games.

In 2002, Tracey in a specially designed wheelchair for paragliding had a paraglider flight Mystic near Bright, Victoria. This was a first paraglider flight for a quadriplegic. At the time, Tracey was Chairman of Wheelchair Sports Victoria.
