= John Forsberg =

Australian Paralympic lawn bowls player

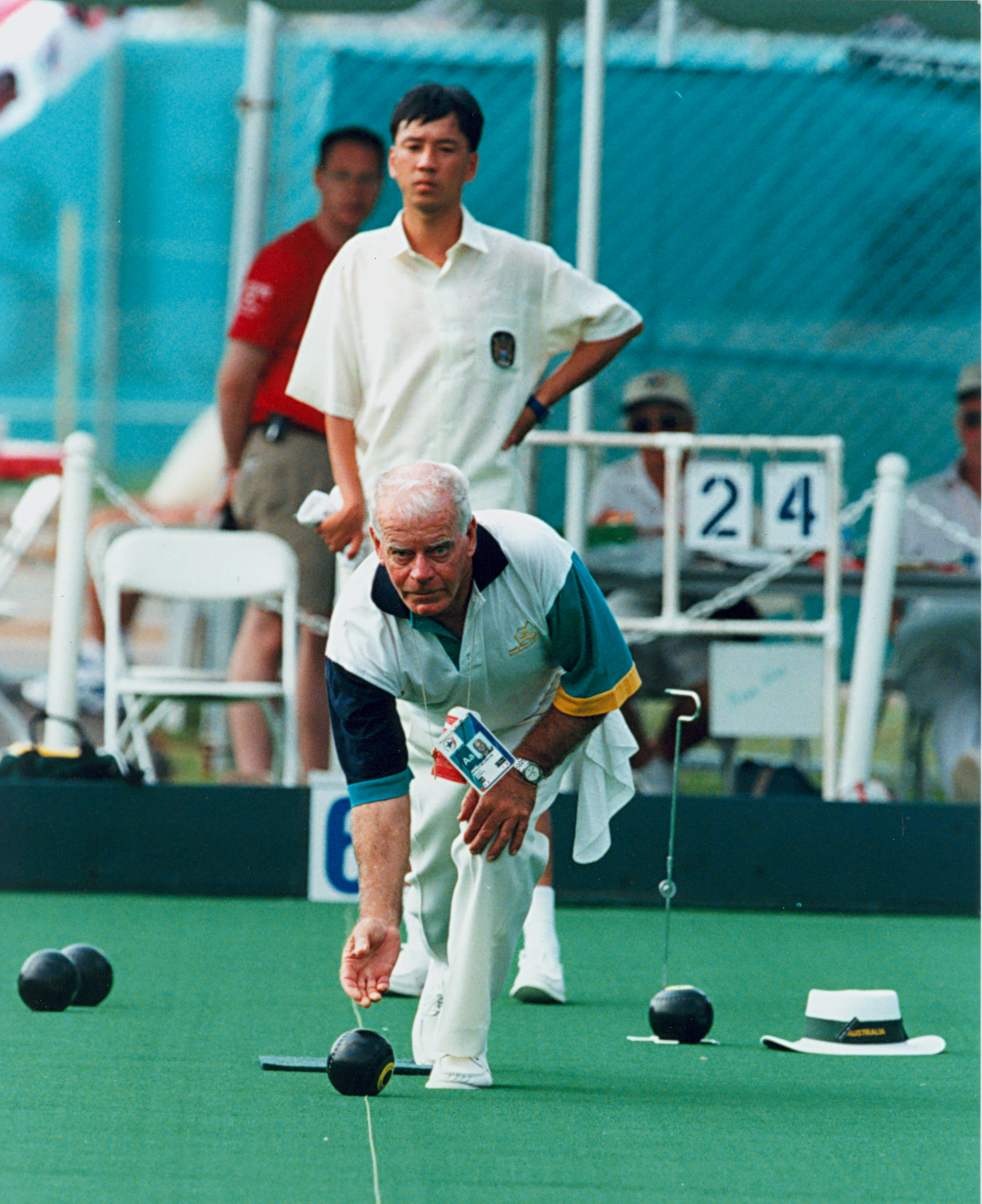
- Forsberg competing at the 1996 Summer Paralympics in Atlanta

Personal information
- Nationality: Australia
- Born: 15 April 1932 (age 94) Melbourne
Medal record
Lawn bowls
Paralympic Games
Silver medal – second place	1984 New York/Stoke Mandeville	Men's Pairs A6/8
Silver medal – second place	1984 New York/Stoke Mandeville	Men's Singles A6/8
Bronze medal – third place	1988 Seoul	Men's Singles LB3

John Forsberg (born 15 April 1932) is an Australian Paralympic lawn bowls player. He was born in Melbourne and is an amputee. At the 1984 New York/Stoke Mandeville Games, he won two silver medals in the Men's Pairs A6/8 and Men's Singles A6/8events. At the 1988 Seoul Paralympics, he won a bronze medal in the Men's Singles LB3 event. He won five gold medals at the 1990 and 1993 world championships. He also competed in lawn bowls at the 1996 Atlanta Paralympics.
