= Ken Moran =

Personal information
- Full name: Kenneth James Moran
- Nationality: Australia
- Born: 27 February 1925 Beaudesert, Queensland
- Died: 6 August 2009 (aged 84) Beaudesert, Queensland
Medal record
Lawn bowls
Paralympic Games
Silver medal – second place	1984 New York/ Stoke Mandeville	Men's Pairs paraplegic
Table tennis
Commonwealth Paraplegic Games
Bronze medal – third place	1974 Dunedin	?

Kenneth "Ken" James Moran, MBE (27 February 1925 – 6 August 2009) was an Australian Paralympic lawn bowler. He won a silver medal in the Men's Pairs at the 1984 Summer Paralympics.

== Personal ==
Moran was born in the Queensland town of Beaudesert on 27 February 1925, the sixth of eight children of Tom and Johanna Moran. He grew up on the family farm during the Great Depression, and had a busy and active young life which included farm duties, schooling and playing tennis and cricket. At age 14, he left school to work full-time on the farm to help support his family during the difficult economic times. While playing a representative cricket match in February 1945, he experienced serious physical symptoms - a sudden but lasting dizziness, loss of balance and inability to focus - that forced him to retire from the match. Within a couple of days, he was diagnosed with polio and spent the next two years in a polio ward at the Royal Brisbane Hospital. When he was finally discharged, he spent a year with an uncle in Brisbane, managing his own rehabilitation and transition to life in a wheelchair before returning to Beaudesert. He studied accounting by correspondence and worked in the field, and began a lifelong involvement in community work.

== Sport ==
Moran took up table tennis and lawn bowls to keep active, playing against and alongside able-bodied players. He won a bronze medal in table tennis at the 1974 Commonwealth Paraplegic Games in Dunedin, New Zealand. He won a silver medal in the men's lawn bowls pairs with Wayne Lewis at the 1984 New York/Stoke Mandeville Paralympics.

== Recognition ==
In the Queen's Birthday Honours 1986 Moran was appointed as a Member of the Order of the British Empire for service to the community and paraplegic sport. On 16 September 2010, the Ken Moran Life Centre was officially opened in Beaudesert.
