= Clifford Swann =

Australian Paralympic lawn bowls player

Personal information
- Nationality: Australia
Medal record
Lawn bowls
Paralympic Games
| Bronze medal – third place | 1984 New York/Stoke Mandeville | Men's Pairs A2/4 |
| Silver medal – second place | 1988 Seoul | Men's Pairs LB2 |

Clifford Swann is an Australian Paralympic lawn bowls player. At the 1984 New York/Stoke Mandeville Games, he won a bronze medal in the Men's Pairs A2/4 event. At the 1988 Seoul Games, he won a silver medal in the Men's Pairs LB2 event with David Boldery.
