= Julie Dowling (athlete) =

Australian Paralympic athlete

Julie Dowling BEM
Personal information
- Full name: Julie Caroline Dowling
- Nationality: Australia
- Born: 7 December 1959 (age 66)
Medal record
Athletics
Paralympic Games
Gold medal – first place	1984 New York/Stoke Mandeville	Women's Javelin 4

Julie Caroline Van Keulen (née Dowling), BEM (born 7 December 1959) is an Australian Paralympic athlete.

== Biography ==
Born in Tasmania, Dowling had a car accident as a teenager that left her paraplegic. Her first national competition was the 1981 National Para Quad Games, where she won three gold medals and broke three Australian records in javelin, shot put and discus. She then competed at the 1982 FESPIC Games, where she won three gold medals at the same events, breaking a world record in the javelin. At the 1983 Stoke Mandeville Games, she won a gold medal in the javelin with yet another world record, a silver medal in the discus and a bronze medal in the shot put. At the 1984 New York/Stoke Mandeville Paralympics, she won a gold medal in the Women's Javelin 4 event, breaking a Paralympic record. She also finished fourth in the Women's Shot Put and Women's Discus. She retired from competition after the games.

== Recognition ==
After the 1984 games, Dowling won three Mercury W.D. & H.O. Wills Star of Sport awards, a Sport Australia Award, a national Para Quad trophy for the best female athlete in international events, and a TAS TV Sportswoman of the Year Award. She was awarded the British Empire Medal (BEM) in the 1985 New Year Honours "for services to the physically handicapped." In 2005, she was inducted into the Tasmanian Sporting Hall of Fame.
