= Canada at the 1984 Summer Paralympics =

- Flag of Canada
- IPC code: CAN
- NPC: Canadian Paralympic Committee
- Website: www.paralympic.ca

in Stoke Mandeville/New York
- Competitors: 166
- Medals Ranked 3rd: Gold 87 Silver 82 Bronze 69 Total 238

Summer Paralympics appearances (overview)
- 1968; 1972; 1976; 1980; 1984; 1988; 1992; 1996; 2000; 2004; 2008; 2012; 2016; 2020; 2024

Canada competed at the 1984 Summer Paralympics in Stoke Mandeville, Great Britain and New York City, United States. 166 competitors from Canada won 238 medals including 87 gold, 82 silver and 69 bronze and finished 3rd in the medal table.

== Medallists ==
Medal	Name	Sport	Event
Gold	David Barefoot	Archery	Men's FITA round C1-C2
Gold	Brian Kelly	Athletics	Men's 20m (arm) C2
Gold	Robert Easton	Athletics	Men's 100m C4
Gold	Ron Minor	Athletics	Men's 200m 4
Gold	Ron Minor	Athletics	Men's 400m 4
Gold	Robert Easton	Athletics	Men's 400m C4
Gold	Paul Clark	Athletics	Men's 800m 2
Gold	Ron Minor	Athletics	Men's 800m 4
Gold	Robert Easton	Athletics	Men's 800m C4
Gold	Robert Mearns	Athletics	Men's 800m C8
Gold	Robert Mearns	Athletics	Men's 1500m cross country C7
Gold	Rick Hansen	Athletics	Men's 1500m 4
Gold	André Viger	Athletics	Men's marathon 3
Gold	Rick Hansen	Athletics	Men's marathon 4
Gold	Mel Fitzgerald	Athletics	Men's marathon 5
Gold	Men's relay team	Athletics	Men's 4x100m relay C4
Gold	Men's relay team	Athletics	Men's 4x200m relay 1A-1C
Gold	Arnold Boldt	Athletics	Men's high jump A2
Gold	Yvan Bourdeau	Athletics	Men's long jump B1
Gold	Dan Leonard	Athletics	Men's discus throw A6-8
Gold	Jacques Martinez	Athletics	Men's shot put 4
Gold	Laura Misciagna	Athletics	Women's 60m C2
Gold	Martha Gustafson	Athletics	Women's 100m 1A
Gold	Tham Simpson	Athletics	Women's 100m 1C
Gold	Debbi Kostelyk	Athletics	Women's 100m 3
Gold	Martha Gustafson	Athletics	Women's 200m 1A
Gold	Tham Simpson	Athletics	Women's 200m 1C
Gold	Laura Misciagna	Athletics	Women's 200m C2
Gold	Martha Gustafson	Athletics	Women's 400m 1A
Gold	Tham Simpson	Athletics	Women's 400m 1C
Gold	Debbi Kostelyk	Athletics	Women's 400m 3
Gold	Martha Gustafson	Athletics	Women's 800m 1A
Gold	Tham Simpson	Athletics	Women's 800m 1C
Gold	Angela Leriti	Athletics	Women's 800m 5
Gold	Angela Leriti	Athletics	Women's 1500m 5
Gold	Christine Nicholas	Athletics	Women's 1500m B2
Gold	Cheryl Hurd	Athletics	Women's 3000m B1
Gold	Christine Nicholas	Athletics	Women's 3000m B3
Gold	Norah Good	Athletics	Women's 3000m B3
Gold	Angela Leriti	Athletics	Women's 5000m 5
Gold	Women's relay team	Athletics	Women's 4x100m relay 2-5
Gold	Martha Gustafson	Athletics	Women's discus throw 1B
Gold	Stephania Balta	Athletics	Women's discus throw A2
Gold	Anne Farrell	Athletics	Women's javelin throw A4
Gold	Joanne Bouw	Athletics	Women's javelin throw C7
Gold	Judy Goodrich	Athletics	Women's javelin throw C8
Gold	Stephania Balta	Athletics	Women's shot put A2
Gold	Joanne Bouw	Athletics	Women's shot put C7
Gold	Laura Misciagna	Athletics	Women's slalom (leg) C2
Gold	Tham Simpson	Athletics	Women's slalom 1C
Gold	Leslie Lord	Cycling	Women's tricycle 1500m CP div 2
Gold	Bill Parry	Swimming	Men's 50m backstroke C8
Gold	Gary Simpson	Swimming	Men's 100m backstroke A4
Gold	Tomas Hainey	Swimming	Men's 100m breaststroke 6
Gold	Mark Hoyle	Swimming	Men's 100m breaststroke B3
Gold	Michael Edgson	Swimming	Men's 100m butterfly B3
Gold	Tomas Hainey	Swimming	Men's 100m freestyle 6
Gold	Michael Edgson	Swimming	Men's 200m individual medley B3
Gold	Timothy McIsaac	Swimming	Men's 400m breaststroke B1
Gold	Mark Hoyle	Swimming	Men's 400m breaststroke B3
Gold	Tomas Hainey	Swimming	Men's 400m freestyle 6
Gold	Timothy McIsaac	Swimming	Men's 400m individual medley B1
Gold	Michael Edgson	Swimming	Men's 400m individual medley B3
Gold	Tomas Hainey	Swimming	Men's 150m individual medley 6
Gold	Men's relay team	Swimming	Men's 4x100m medley relay B1-B3
Gold	Jose Faucher	Swimming	Women's 25m butterfly 2
Gold	Martha Gustafson	Swimming	Women's 25m freestyle 1B
Gold	Susan Chick	Swimming	Women's 25m freestyle C6
Gold	Debbie Willows	Swimming	Women's 25m freestyle with aids C1
Gold	Josee Lake	Swimming	Women's 50m backstroke A9
Gold	Judy Goodrich	Swimming	Women's 50m backstroke C8
Gold	Josee Lake	Swimming	Women's 50m breaststroke A9
Gold	Jose Faucher	Swimming	Women's 50m freestyle 2
Gold	Susan Chick	Swimming	Women's 50m freestyle C6
Gold	Judy Goodrich	Swimming	Women's 50m freestyle C8
Gold	Yvette Michel	Swimming	Women's 100m backstroke B1
Gold	Josee Lake	Swimming	Women's 100m freestyle A9
Gold	Yvette Michel	Swimming	Women's 100m freestyle B1
Gold	Judy Goodrich	Swimming	Women's 100m freestyle C8
Gold	Josee Lake	Swimming	Women's 150m individual medley A9
Gold	Jose Faucher	Swimming	Women's 200m freestyle 2
Gold	Yvette Michel	Swimming	Women's 200m individual medley B1
Gold	Andrea Rossi	Swimming	Women's 400m individual medley B1
Gold	Jose Faucher	Swimming	Women's 75m individual medley 2
Gold	Women's relay team	Swimming	Women's 4x50m freestyle C1-C8
Gold	Wayne Bell	Wrestling	Men's 48kg
Gold	Eddie Morten	Wrestling	Men's 68kg
Silver	Yvan Bourdeau	Athletics	Men's 100m B1
Silver	Paul Clark	Athletics	Men's 200m 2
Silver	Paul Clark	Athletics	Men's 400m 2
Silver	Robert Mearns	Athletics	Men's 400m C7
Silver	Paul Clark	Athletics	Men's 1500m 2
Silver	Mel Fitzgerald	Athletics	Men's 1500m 5
Silver	Paul Clark	Athletics	Men's 5000m 2
Silver	Rick Hansen	Athletics	Men's 5000m 4
Silver	Mel Fitzgerald	Athletics	Men's 5000m 5
Silver	Paul Clark	Athletics	Men's marathon 2
Silver	Men's relay team	Athletics	Men's 4x200m relay 2-5
Silver	Men's relay team	Athletics	Men's 4x400m relay 2-5
Silver	Jeff Tiessen	Athletics	Men's high jump A5
Silver	Walter Butt	Athletics	Men's discus throw C6
Silver	Dan Leonard	Athletics	Men's javelin throw A6-8
Silver	John Donahue	Athletics	Men's shot put 1B
Silver	Dan Leonard	Athletics	Men's shot put A6-8
Silver	Denis Sevigny	Athletics	Men's shot put C8
Silver	Chris Stoddard	Athletics	Men's slalom 3
Silver	Robert Easton	Athletics	Men's slalom C4
Silver	Irene Larochelle	Athletics	Women's 100m C5
Silver	Debbi Kostelyk	Athletics	Women's 200m 3
Silver	A. Ieretti	Athletics	Women's 200m 5
Silver	Angela Leriti	Athletics	Women's 400m 5
Silver	D. Rakieki	Athletics	Women's 800m 4
Silver	Cheryl Hurd	Athletics	Women's 1500m B1
Silver	Norah Good	Athletics	Women's 1500m B3
Silver	Stephania Balta	Athletics	Women's javelin throw A2
Silver	Debbie Willows	Athletics	Women's precision throw C1
Silver	Judy Zelman	Athletics	Women's shot put 1C
Silver	Mixed relay team	Athletics	Mixed 3x60m relay C2-3
Silver	Russell Cecchini	Boccia	Men's individual C1
Silver	Gord Hamilton	Boccia	Men's individual C2
Silver	Dean Dwyer	Cycling	Men's bicycle 1500m CP div 3
Silver	Dean Dwyer	Cycling	Men's bicycle 5000m CP div 3
Silver	Arlene Aikenhead	Equestrian	Dressage - elementary walk C1-2
Silver	Tim Hamilton	Equestrian	Obstacle course - walk C1-3
Silver	Men's team	Football 7-a-side	Men's wheelchair
Silver	Women's team	Goalball	Women's tournament
Silver	Al Slater	Powerlifting	Men's -82.5kg
Silver	Gino Vendetti	Powerlifting	Men's -90kg
Silver	Mickey Macri	Swimming	Men's 25m backstroke L2
Silver	Mickey Macri	Swimming	Men's 25m freestyle L2
Silver	Brian Kelly	Swimming	Men's 25m freestyle with aids C1
Silver	Bill Parry	Swimming	Men's 50m breaststroke C8
Silver	Bill Parry	Swimming	Men's 50m butterfly C8
Silver	Ken Booth	Swimming	Men's 50m freestyle B1
Silver	Joe Higgins	Swimming	Men's 50m freestyle C4
Silver	Philip Mindorf	Swimming	Men's 100m backstroke A8
Silver	Greg Thompson	Swimming	Men's 100m backstroke B1
Silver	Michael Edgson	Swimming	Men's 100m backstroke B3
Silver	Timothy McIsaac	Swimming	Men's 100m breaststroke B1
Silver	Bruce Vandermolen	Swimming	Men's 100m breaststroke B2
Silver	Tomas Hainey	Swimming	Men's 100m butterfly 6
Silver	Lee Grenon	Swimming	Men's 100m butterfly B2
Silver	Joe Higgins	Swimming	Men's 100m freestyle C4
Silver	Joe Higgins	Swimming	Men's 200m freestyle C4
Silver	Timothy McIsaac	Swimming	Men's 200m individual medley B1
Silver	Dennis Quenneville	Swimming	Men's 400m freestyle A2
Silver	Timothy McIsaac	Swimming	Men's 400m freestyle B1
Silver	Lee Grenon	Swimming	Men's 400m freestyle B2
Silver	Scott Herron	Swimming	Men's 400m individual medley B1
Silver	Men's relay team	Swimming	Men's 4x100m freestyle relay B1-B3
Silver	Men's relay team	Swimming	Men's 4x100m medley relay A1-A9
Silver	Martha Gustafson	Swimming	Women's 25m backstroke 1B
Silver	Jose Faucher	Swimming	Women's 50m backstroke 2
Silver	Susan Smith	Swimming	Women's 50m breaststroke C8
Silver	Tamara Boccaccio	Swimming	Women's 50m freestyle B1
Silver	Patricia Hennin	Swimming	Women's 50m freestyle C4
Silver	Judy Goodrich	Swimming	Women's 100m backstroke C8
Silver	Sigrid Voth	Swimming	Women's 100m breaststroke 5
Silver	Yvette Michel	Swimming	Women's 100m breaststroke B1
Silver	Patricia Hennin	Swimming	Women's 200m freestyle C4
Silver	Andrea Rossi	Swimming	Women's 200m individual medley B1
Silver	Sigrid Voth	Swimming	Women's 400m freestyle 5
Silver	Yvette Michel	Swimming	Women's 400m freestyle B1
Silver	Chris Gabriel	Wrestling	Men's 52kg
Silver	Gord Hope	Wrestling	Men's 57kg
Silver	Pier Morten	Wrestling	Men's 62kg
Silver	Frank Diperdomenico	Wrestling	Men's 74kg
Silver	Wayne Prymych	Wrestling	Men's 82kg
Silver	Dave Duncan	Wrestling	Men's 90kg
Bronze	Terry Gehlert	Athletics	Men's 100m 1B
Bronze	Ron Minor	Athletics	Men's 100m 4
Bronze	Mel Fitzgerald	Athletics	Men's 800m 5
Bronze	Gino Vendetti	Athletics	Men's 800m C4
Bronze	André Viger	Athletics	Men's 1500m 3
Bronze	R. Sampson	Athletics	Men's marathon 3
Bronze	Ron Minor	Athletics	Men's marathon 4
Bronze	Bob Schmid	Athletics	Men's shot put 1B
Bronze	John Belanger	Athletics	Men's shot put A1
Bronze	Peter Palubicki	Athletics	Men's shot put A3
Bronze	Glenn Whitford	Athletics	Men's shot put C4
Bronze	Ken Thomas	Athletics	Men's slalom (leg) C2
Bronze	Anne Farrell	Athletics	Women's 100m A4
Bronze	Sandy Morgan	Athletics	Women's 100m C5
Bronze	Judy Zelman	Athletics	Women's 200m 1C
Bronze	Elaine Hewitt	Athletics	Women's 200m C3
Bronze	Judy Zelman	Athletics	Women's 400m 1C
Bronze	Anne Farrell	Athletics	Women's 400m A4
Bronze	Kim Umbach	Athletics	Women's 3000m B3
Bronze	Cheril Barrer	Athletics	Women's long jump A2
Bronze	Joanne Bouw	Athletics	Women's long jump C7
Bronze	Susan Smith	Athletics	Women's discus throw C5
Bronze	Joanne Bouw	Athletics	Women's discus throw C7
Bronze	Debbie Willows	Athletics	Women's distance throw C1
Bronze	Harriet Lahman	Athletics	Women's distance throw C2
Bronze	Judy Zelman	Athletics	Women's javelin throw 1C
Bronze	Susan Smith	Athletics	Women's javelin throw C5
Bronze	Martha Johnson	Athletics	Women's shot put C5
Bronze	Harriet Lahman	Athletics	Women's medicine ball thrust C2
Bronze	Debbie Willows	Boccia	Women's individual C1
Bronze	Chene la Rochelle	Equestrian	Dressage - advanced walk/trot C4-5
Bronze	Tim Hamilton	Equestrian	Dressage - elementary walk C1-2
Bronze	Chene la Rochelle	Equestrian	Dressage - elementary walk/trot C4-5
Bronze	Arlene Aikenhead	Equestrian	Obstacle course - walk C1-3
Bronze	Bob Scrace	Swimming	Men's 25m freestyle C6
Bronze	Russell Cecchini	Swimming	Men's 25m freestyle with aids C1
Bronze	Ken Thomas	Swimming	Men's 25m freestyle with aids C2
Bronze	Joe Higgins	Swimming	Men's 50m backstroke C4
Bronze	Jim Visser	Swimming	Men's 50m breaststroke B2
Bronze	Rick Gronman	Swimming	Men's 50m breaststroke C8
Bronze	Bob Scrace	Swimming	Men's 50m freestyle C6
Bronze	Bill Parry	Swimming	Men's 50m freestyle C8
Bronze	J. Stanfield	Swimming	Men's 100m backstroke 4
Bronze	J. Stanfield	Swimming	Men's 100m breaststroke 4
Bronze	Dennis Quenneville	Swimming	Men's 100m breaststroke A2
Bronze	Ken Booth	Swimming	Men's 100m butterfly B1
Bronze	Mark Ludbrook	Swimming	Men's 100m freestyle A4
Bronze	Gary Simpson	Swimming	Men's 200m individual medley A4
Bronze	Jim Visser	Swimming	Men's 400m breaststroke B2
Bronze	Mark Hoyle	Swimming	Men's 400m freestyle B3
Bronze	Lee Grenon	Swimming	Men's 400m individual medley B2
Bronze	Men's relay team	Swimming	Men's 4x50m freestyle relay C1-C8
Bronze	Men's relay team	Swimming	Men's 4x100m freestyle relay A1-A9
Bronze	Susan Chick	Swimming	Women's 25m backstroke C6
Bronze	Jennifer Veenboer	Swimming	Women's 50m backstroke A9
Bronze	Jennifer Veenboer	Swimming	Women's 50m breaststroke A9
Bronze	Tamara Boccaccio	Swimming	Women's 50m breaststroke B1
Bronze	Martha Johnson	Swimming	Women's 50m freestyle C5
Bronze	Sigrid Voth	Swimming	Women's 100m backstroke 5
Bronze	Andrea Rossi	Swimming	Women's 100m butterfly B1
Bronze	Sigrid Voth	Swimming	Women's 100m freestyle 5
Bronze	Patricia Hennin	Swimming	Women's 100m freestyle C4
Bronze	Jennifer Veenboer	Swimming	Women's 150m individual medley A9
Bronze	Andrea Rossi	Swimming	Women's 400m breaststroke B1
Bronze	Andrea Rossi	Swimming	Women's 400m freestyle B1
Bronze	Sigrid Voth	Swimming	Women's 150m individual medley 5
Bronze	Martha Johnson	Table tennis	Women's singles C3

== See also ==
- Canada at the Paralympics
- Canada at the 1984 Summer Olympics
