= Canada at the 1988 Summer Paralympics =

- Flag of Canada
- IPC code: CAN
- NPC: Canadian Paralympic Committee
- Website: www.paralympic.ca

in Seoul
- Competitors: 157
- Medals Ranked 4th: Gold 55 Silver 42 Bronze 55 Total 152

Summer Paralympics appearances (overview)
- 1968; 1972; 1976; 1980; 1984; 1988; 1992; 1996; 2000; 2004; 2008; 2012; 2016; 2020; 2024

Canada competed at the 1988 Summer Paralympics in Seoul, South Korea. 157 competitors from Canada won 152 medals including 55 gold, 42 silver and 55 bronze and finished 4th in the medal table.

== Medallists ==
Medal	Name	Sport	Event
Gold	Daniel Wesley	Athletics	Men's 100m A1-3/A9/L2
Gold	Jamie Bone	Athletics	Men's 100m C3
Gold	Robert Easton	Athletics	Men's 100m C4-5
Gold	Serge Raymond	Athletics	Men's 200m 1B
Gold	Andre Beaudoin	Athletics	Men's 200m 1C
Gold	Jamie Bone	Athletics	Men's 200m C3
Gold	Robert Easton	Athletics	Men's 200m C4-5
Gold	Clayton Gerein	Athletics	Men's 400m 1B
Gold	Jeff Tiessen	Athletics	Men's 400m A5/A7
Gold	Jamie Bone	Athletics	Men's 400m C3
Gold	Clayton Gerein	Athletics	Men's 800m 1B
Gold	Paul Clark	Athletics	Men's 800m 2
Gold	Daniel Wesley	Athletics	Men's 800m A1-3/A9/L2
Gold	Serge Raymond	Athletics	Men's 1500m 1B
Gold	Clayton Gerein	Athletics	Men's 5000m 1B
Gold	Serge Raymond	Athletics	Men's marathon 1B
Gold	Marc Quessy	Athletics	Men's marathon 2
Gold	Andre Viger	Athletics	Men's marathon 3
Gold	Arnold Boldt	Athletics	Men's high jump A2/A9
Gold	Richard Reelie	Athletics	Men's discus throw 1B
Gold	Richard Reelie	Athletics	Men's javelin throw 1B
Gold	Richard Reelie	Athletics	Men's shot put 1B
Gold	Jacques Martinez	Athletics	Men's shot put 4
Gold	Claude Poumerol	Athletics	Women's 100m A4/A9
Gold	Sylvie Bergeron	Athletics	Women's 200m C8
Gold	Joanne Bouw	Athletics	Women's discus throw C7
Gold	Joanne Bouw	Athletics	Women's javelin throw C7
Gold	Joanne Bouw	Athletics	Women's shot put C7
Gold	Halldor Bjarnason	Cycling	Men's tricycle 1500m C5-6
Gold	Dean Dwyer	Cycling	Men's 60 km LC3
Gold	Michael Edgson	Swimming	Men's 50m freestyle B3
Gold	Michael Edgson	Swimming	Men's 100m freestyle B3
Gold	Stephane Lecours	Swimming	Men's 400m freestyle A2
Gold	Timothy McIsaac	Swimming	Men's 400m freestyle B1
Gold	Lee Grenon	Swimming	Men's 400m freestyle B2
Gold	Michael Edgson	Swimming	Men's 400m freestyle B3
Gold	Stephane Lecours	Swimming	Men's 100m backstroke A2
Gold	Timothy McIsaac	Swimming	Men's 100m backstroke B1
Gold	Michael Edgson	Swimming	Men's 100m backstroke B3
Gold	Stephane Lecours	Swimming	Men's 100m breaststroke A2
Gold	Stephane Lecours	Swimming	Men's 100m butterfly A2
Gold	Timothy McIsaac	Swimming	Men's 100m butterfly B1
Gold	Lee Grenon	Swimming	Men's 100m butterfly B2
Gold	Michael Edgson	Swimming	Men's 100m butterfly B3
Gold	Stephane Lecours	Swimming	Men's 200m individual medley A2
Gold	Timothy McIsaac	Swimming	Men's 200m individual medley B1
Gold	Michael Edgson	Swimming	Men's 200m individual medley B3
Gold	Michael Edgson	Swimming	Men's 400m individual medley B3
Gold	Men's relay team	Swimming	Men's 4 × 100 m freestyle relay B1-B3
Gold	Men's relay team	Swimming	Men's 4 × 100 m medley relay B1-B3
Gold	Tammy Barker	Swimming	Women's 100m freestyle C4
Gold	Tammy Barker	Swimming	Women's 200m freestyle C4
Gold	Joanne Mucz	Swimming	Women's 400m freestyle A4
Gold	Yvette Weicker	Swimming	Women's 100m backstroke B1
Silver	Andre Beaudoin	Athletics	Men's 100m 1C
Silver	Marc Quessy	Athletics	Men's 100m 2
Silver	William Wiebe	Athletics	Men's 100m A6/A8-9/L4
Silver	Michael Johner	Athletics	Men's 100m C4-5
Silver	Daniel Wesley	Athletics	Men's 200m A1-3/A9/L2
Silver	Gino Vendetti	Athletics	Men's 200m C4-5
Silver	Daryl Stubel	Athletics	Men's 400m 1B
Silver	Andre Beaudoin	Athletics	Men's 400m 1C
Silver	Daniel Wesley	Athletics	Men's 400m A1-3/A9/L2
Silver	Michael Johner	Athletics	Men's 400m C4-5
Silver	Clayton Gerein	Athletics	Men's 1500m 1B
Silver	Paul Clark	Athletics	Men's 1500m 2
Silver	Daniel Wesley	Athletics	Men's 1500m A1-3/A9/L2
Silver	Daniel Wesley	Athletics	Men's 5000m A1-3/A9/L2
Silver	Andre Viger	Athletics	Men's 10000m 3
Silver	Paul Clark	Athletics	Men's marathon 2
Silver	Arnold Boldt	Athletics	Men's long jump A2/A9
Silver	Gary Schaff	Athletics	Men's discus throw 2
Silver	Stewart McKeown	Athletics	Men's discus throw 3
Silver	John Belanger	Athletics	Men's discus throw A1-3/A9/L3
Silver	John Belanger	Athletics	Men's javelin throw A1-3/A9/L3
Silver	James Enright	Athletics	Men's javelin throw A4/A9
Silver	Debbi Kostelyk	Athletics	Women's 100m 3
Silver	Claude Poumerol	Athletics	Women's 200m A4/A9
Silver	Linda Hamilton	Athletics	Women's 400m A1-3/A9/L2
Silver	Sylvie Bergeron	Athletics	Women's 400m C8
Silver	Linda Hamilton	Athletics	Women's 800m A1-3/A9/L2
Silver	Norma Lorincz	Athletics	Women's 800m C7
Silver	Halldor Bjarnason	Cycling	Men's tricycle 3000m C5-6
Silver	Michael Johnson	Powerlifting	Men's 82.5 kg
Silver	Heather Kuttai	Shooting	Women's air pistol 2-6
Silver	Bernard Gehring; Heather Kuttai; Richard Schell	Shooting	Mixed air pistol team open
Silver	Tomas Hainey	Swimming	Men's 100m freestyle 6
Silver	Tomas Hainey	Swimming	Men's 400m freestyle 6
Silver	Jeff Worobetz	Swimming	Men's 50m breaststroke C6
Silver	Tomas Hainey	Swimming	Men's 100m butterfly 6
Silver	Tomas Hainey	Swimming	Men's 200m individual medley 6
Silver	Joanne Mucz	Swimming	Women's 100m freestyle A4
Silver	Yvette Weicker	Swimming	Women's 100m freestyle B1
Silver	Joanne Mucz	Swimming	Women's 100m backstroke A4
Silver	Tammy Barker	Swimming	Women's 100m backstroke C4
Silver	Judy Goodrich	Swimming	Women's 100m backstroke C8
Bronze	David Severin	Athletics	Men's 100m C3
Bronze	Michael Johner	Athletics	Men's 200m C4-5
Bronze	Ted Vince	Athletics	Men's 400m A1-3/A9/L2
Bronze	David Severin	Athletics	Men's 400m C3
Bronze	Andre Beaudoin	Athletics	Men's 800m 1C
Bronze	Andre Viger	Athletics	Men's 800m 3
Bronze	Jeff Adams	Athletics	Men's 800m 5-6
Bronze	Keith Myette	Athletics	Men's 800m B1
Bronze	Ken Thomas	Athletics	Men's 800m C2
Bronze	Robert Mearns	Athletics	Men's 800m C7
Bronze	Jeff Adams	Athletics	Men's 1500m 5-6
Bronze	Robert Mearns	Athletics	Men's 1500m C7
Bronze	David Howe	Athletics	Men's 5000m cross country C7
Bronze	James Enright	Athletics	Men's high jump A4/A9
Bronze	Andre Viger	Athletics	Men's 5000m 3
Bronze	Clayton Gerein	Athletics	Men's marathon 1B
Bronze	Ted Vince	Athletics	Men's marathon A1-3/A9/L1-2
Bronze	Jacques Martinez	Athletics	Men's discus throw 4
Bronze	Stewart McKeown	Athletics	Men's shot put 3
Bronze	John Belanger	Athletics	Men's shot put A1-3/A9/L3
Bronze	Terry Robinson	Athletics	Men's slalom C1
Bronze	Linda Hamilton	Athletics	Women's 100m A1-3/A9/L2
Bronze	Lynette Wildeman	Athletics	Women's 100m A6/A8-9/L4
Bronze	Sylvie Sauve	Athletics	Women's 100m C6
Bronze	Linda Hamilton	Athletics	Women's 200m A1-3/A9/L2
Bronze	Lynette Wildeman	Athletics	Women's 200m A6/A8-9/L4
Bronze	Sonja Atkins	Athletics	Women's 400m C7
Bronze	Racquel Head	Athletics	Women's 800m C7
Bronze	Linda Hamilton	Athletics	Women's 1500m A1-3/A9/L2
Bronze	Jacqueline Toews	Athletics	Women's discus throw B2
Bronze	Trish Lovegrove	Athletics	Women's shot put B1
Bronze	Ljiliana Wubisic	Athletics	Women's shot put B2
Bronze	Marjorie Lynch	Athletics	Women's shot put C4
Bronze	Jamie Bone; Andre Lavallee; Laura Misciagna; David Severin	Athletics	Mixed 4 × 100 m relay C2-3
Bronze	Patricia Campion; Lucy Greco; Danielle Lessard; Lisa McLeod; Dianne Robitaille; Helena Rooyakkers	Goalball	Women's tournament
Bronze	Pier Morten	Judo	Men's 65 kg
Bronze	Eddie Morten	Judo	Men's 71 kg
Bronze	Adam Salamandyk	Shooting	Men's air rifle 2 positions with aids 1A-1C
Bronze	Adam Salamandyk	Shooting	Men's air rifle kneeling with aids 1A-1C
Bronze	Timothy McIsaac	Swimming	Men's 50m freestyle B1
Bronze	Timothy McIsaac	Swimming	Men's 100m freestyle B1
Bronze	Philip Mindorff	Swimming	Men's 100m backstroke A8
Bronze	Timothy McIsaac	Swimming	Men's 200m breaststroke B1
Bronze	Lee Grenon	Swimming	Men's 400m individual medley B2
Bronze	Yvette Weicker	Swimming	Women's 50m freestyle B1
Bronze	Susan Chick	Swimming	Women's 100m freestyle C6
Bronze	Judy Goodrich	Swimming	Women's 100m freestyle C8
Bronze	Michelle Arnold	Swimming	Women's 400m freestyle B3
Bronze	Michelle Arnold	Swimming	Women's 100m backstroke B3
Bronze	Yvette Weicker	Swimming	Women's 50m breaststroke B1
Bronze	Yvette Weicker	Swimming	Women's 100m breaststroke B1
Bronze	Tamara Boccaccio	Swimming	Women's 200m breaststroke B1
Bronze	Yvette Weicker	Swimming	Women's 200m individual medley B1
Bronze	Michelle Arnold	Swimming	Women's 200m individual medley B3
Bronze	Michelle Arnold	Swimming	Women's 400m individual medley B3
Bronze	Women's relay team	Swimming	Women's 4 × 100 m medley relay B1-B3

== See also ==
- Canada at the Paralympics
- Canada at the 1988 Summer Olympics
