= Athletics at the 1984 Summer Paralympics – Men's marathon 3 =

Men's marathon 3 at the VII Paralympic Games
- Paralympic Athletics
- Competitors: 15 from 8 nations

Medalists
1st place, gold medalist(s)		André Viger	Canada
2nd place, silver medalist(s)		Gregor Golombek	West Germany
3rd place, bronze medalist(s)		Ross Sampson	Canada

The Men's marathon 3 was a wheelchair marathon event in athletics at the 1984 Summer Paralympics. The race was won by André Viger.

== Results ==
Place	Athlete	Time
1	André Viger (CAN)	1:54:41
2	Gregor Golombek (FRG)	2:01:36
3	Ross Sampson (CAN)	2:04:42
4	Morice Hennessy (NZL)	2:16:03
5	Ian Gainey (AUS)	2:17:14
6	Chris Stoddard (CAN)	2:19:42
7	Rafael Ibarra (USA)	2:25:31
8	H. Kulzer (FRG)	2:29:07
9	Terje Roel (NOR)	2:32:26
10	N. Ogawa (JPN)	2:34:25
-	G. Murray (USA)	DNF
-	Cornelio Nunez (MEX)	DNF
-	Ron Payette (CAN)	DNF
-	J. Rodolf (USA)	DNF
-	Ron van Elswyk (CAN)	DNF

== See also ==
- Marathon at the Paralympics
