= Kim Kilpatrick =

Canadian para-swimmer and therapist

Personal information
- National team: Canada
- Born: c. 1966 Ottawa, Ontario, Canada

Sport
- Country: Canada
- Sport: Para-swimming
- Disability: Visual impairment
Medal record
Women's Para-swimming
Representing Canada
Event	1st	2nd	3rd
Paralympic Games	1	2	0
Total	1	2	0
Paralympic Games
Gold medal – first place	1980 Arnhem	women's 4x100 m individual medley A
Silver medal – second place	1980 Arnhem	women's 4x100 m freestyle relay A-B
Silver medal – second place	1980 Arnhem	women's 4x100 m medley relay A-B

Kim Kilpatrick (born c. 1966) is a Canadian para-swimmer and therapist with a visual impairment. She won the gold medal in the women's 4 × 100-metre individual medley A competition as well as the silver medal in the women's 4 × 100-metre freestyle relay A-B and the women's 4 × 100-metre medley relay A-B events alongside Lisa Bentz, Yvette Michel and Andrea Rossi at the 1980 Summer Paralympics in Arnhem, Netherlands.

== Early life ==
Kilpatrick was born c. 1966, and comes from Ottawa, Ontario, Canada. She was born completely blind but has limited vision in one eye and can see shadows and distinguish between dark and light colors. Kilpatrick's parents had extensive experience participating in sports and she has one sibling. She began swimming competitively from the age of ten and was guided by the use of a special tapper to tap me on the head that was invented by her father to tap her on the head when she reached the end of the pool to avoid striking her head against the wall. She attended W. Ross Macdonald School for the Blind and liked studying English as well as History and disliked learning Geography. In 1977, Kilpatrick began swimming and was entered in Class A category events since she is blind.

== Swimming career ==
She gained qualification to the 1978 Ontario Games for the Physically Disabled that were staged in Windsor by achieving the minimum qualifying standard at a sports competition for the blind at her school. Kilpatrick won the 50-metre freestyle, 400-metre freestyle and the 50-metre breaststroke in the blind division. She placed second in the 50-metre freestroke and the 100-metre breastroke competitions. In the 1979 Brewer Park Centennial held at the Ottawa Coliseum, Kilpatrick won six events in her division, such as a gold medal in the relay event. She went on to achieve four first places in the Class A blind division at the Central-West Ontario Regional Games in Brantford. At the 1980 Ontario Games for the Disabled, she placed first in the women's 400-metre freestyle and the women's 100-metre butterfly events.

Kilpatrick qualified for her first international competition, the 1980 Summer Paralympics in Arnhem, Netherlands. She failed to qualify for the final of the women's 400 metres A athletics competition by finishing second in her heat and placed fourth in the final of the women's 800 metres A event. Kilpatrick went on to come fourth in the women's 4 × 50-metre individual medley A swimming event and won the gold medal in the women's 4 × 10-metre individual medley A. Kilpatrick also finished seventh in the Women's 100 m Freestyle A. She was part of the Canada team that won the silver in both the women's 4 × 100-metre freestyle relay A-B and the women's 4 × 100-metre medley relay A-B events alongside Lisa Bentz, Yvette Michel and Andrea Rossi.

At the 1982 Ontario Games for the Disabled in Sarnia, Kilpatrick won five gold medals in swimming and set two new personal records in the 100-metre freestyle and 200-metre freestyle disciplines. She qualified as one of ten students at her school who would compete in the 1984 Summer Paralympics in Long Island, New York. Kilpatrick finished seventh in the women 100-metre backstroke B1 competition, sixth in each of the women's 200-metre individual medley B1 and the women's 100-metre freestyle B1 events and fourth in the women's 100-metre breaststroke B1 competition.

== Later life ==
Kilpatrick became a therapist and worked to assist in the direction of a Canadian National Institute for the Blind summer activities program for legally blind preadolescent children in Eastern Ontario in 1988. She subsequently became a music therapist and worked for the Victorian Order of Nurses program for those with various disabilities. Kilpatrick is also a disability advocate as well as a storyteller. She is a 2013 inductee of the Ontario Blind Sports Association Hall of Fame.
