= Ranfurly Castle =

- Riccarton, East Ayrshire, Scotland; UK grid reference NS414407
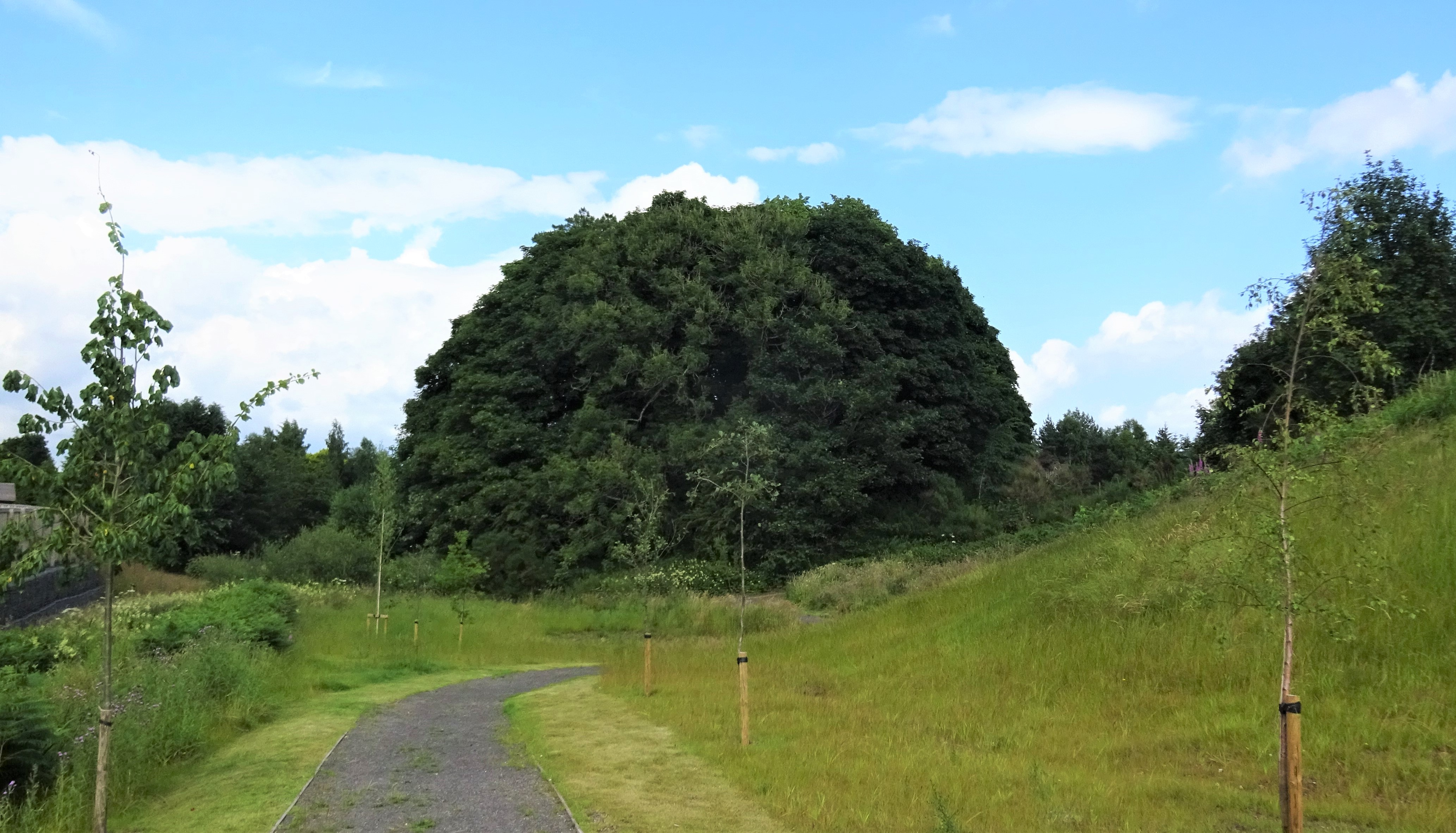
- The wooded Ranfurly Castle motte

Site information
- Type: Keep and Motte
- Open to the public: No
- Condition: Ruin

Location
- Ranfurly Castle
- Coordinates: 55.8526°N 4.5841°W

Site history
- Built: 15th century
- Built by: Knox family
- In use: 15th to 18th centuries
- Materials: Ashlar masonry

Ranfurly Castle is a ruined 15th century castle, about 0.5 miles (0.8 km) south west of Bridge of Weir, Renfrewshire, Scotland, in Ranfurly golf course. Alternatively the castle may be called Ranfurlie Castle.

== History ==
The castle was built by the Knox family in about 1440, but passed to the Earl of Dundonald, a Cochrane in 1665, and subsequently to the Aitkenheads.

== Structure ==
Ranfurly Castle was a small keep, with a courtyard. Two storeys of the keep remain, although there were previously at least three storeys, and three cellars of the buildings once in the courtyard.

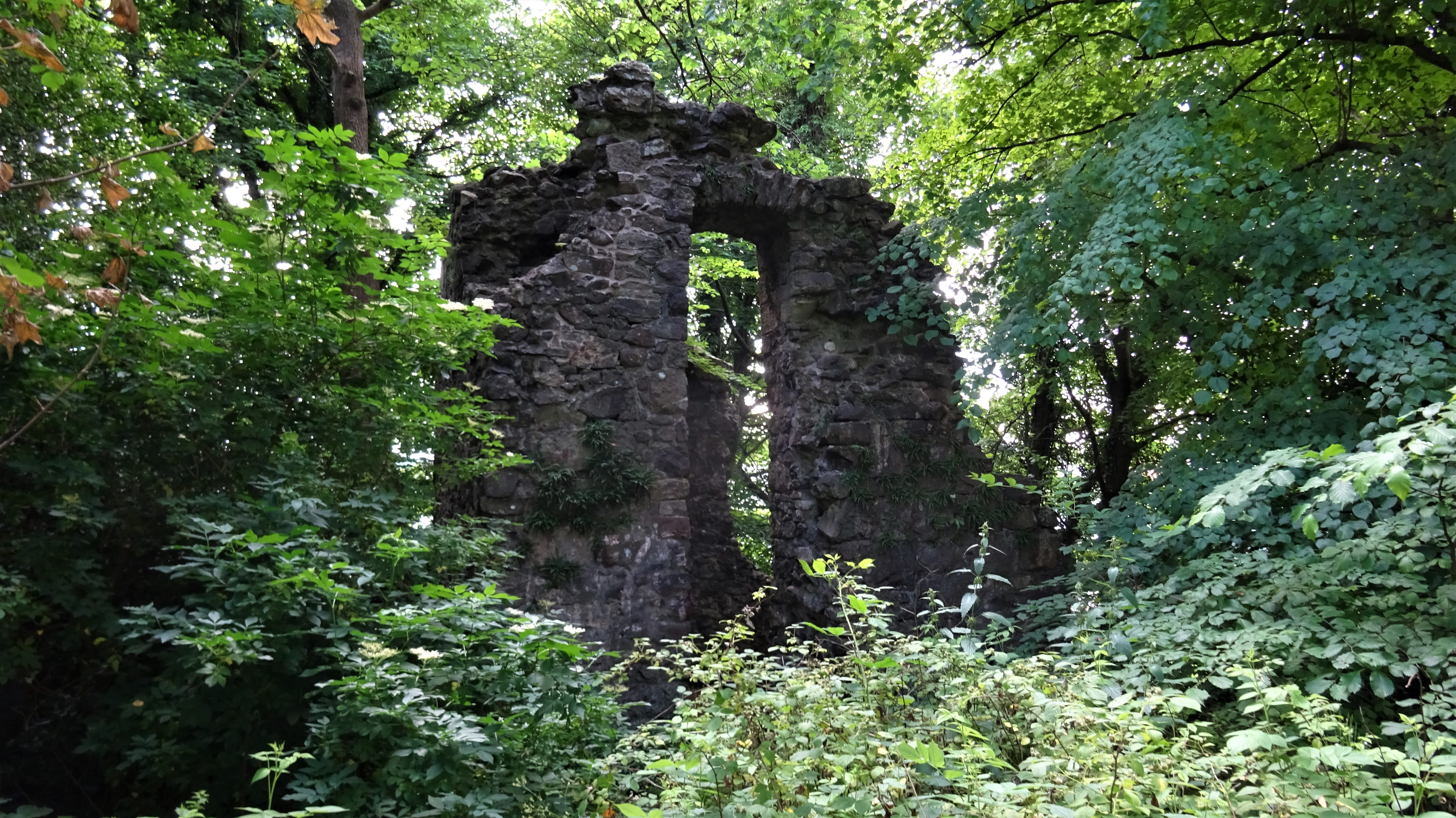
The ruins of the keep.

The walls of the ground floor had arrowslits. The main entrance was at first floor level. The east wing, which was added about 200 years after initial construction, is the most modern part of the building. A south wing providing three vaults for cattle and stores on the ground floor and probably three rooms for the family above were also added, although the date is unknown. The keep was 6.0 metres (19.7 ft) square, and it survives to around 7.0 metres (23.0 ft). The walls are constructed of rough random rubble, although there are quoins of dressed stone. In the east wall there is a doorway, and a slit window with a wide internal splay. It is likely that there were adjustments to the initial building at the time of the additions.

== See also ==
- Castles in Great Britain and Ireland
- List of castles in Scotland
