= Cycling at the 1984 Summer Paralympics =

Cycling at the VII Paralympic Games
- Paralympic Cycling

Paralympic symbol (1988-1994)

Cycling at the 1984 Summer Paralympics consisted of seven road cycling events, six for men and one for women.

== Medal summary ==
| Event | Gold | Silver | Bronze |
|---|---|---|---|
| Men's bicycle 1500 m CP div 3 | Morten Fromyr; Norway | Dean Dwyer; Canada | Toine Meijris; Netherlands |
| Men's bicycle 1500 m CP div 4 | Dominique Molle; France | Richard Lufkin; United States | Candido Leite; Portugal |
| Men's bicycle 5000 m CP div 3 | Morten Fromyr; Norway | Dean Dwyer; Canada | Toine Meijris; Netherlands |
| Men's bicycle 5000 m CP div 4 | Dominique Molle; France | Antonio Jose Silva; Portugal | Richard Lufkin; United States |
| Men's tricycle 1500 m CP div 2 | Johnny Kuiserud; Norway | Hans Peter Burk; West Germany | Stefan Krieger; West Germany |
| Men's tricycle 3000 m CP div 2 | Johan Smolders; Netherlands | Johnny Kuiserud; Norway | Hans Peter Burk; West Germany |
| Women's tricycle 1500 m CP div 2 | Leslie Lord; Canada | Marie Krisi Ranninen; Finland | |

=== Medal table ===
This ranking sorts countries by the number of gold medals earned by their cyclists (in this context a country is an entity represented by a National Paralympic Committee). The number of silver medals is taken into consideration next and then the number of bronze medals. If, after the above, countries are still tied, equal ranking is given and they are listed alphabetically.

| Rank | Nation | Gold | Silver | Bronze | Total |
|---|---|---|---|---|---|
| 1 | Norway (NOR) | 3 | 1 | 0 | 4 |
| 2 | France (FRA) | 2 | 0 | 0 | 2 |
| 3 | Canada (CAN) | 1 | 2 | 0 | 3 |
| 4 | Netherlands (NED) | 1 | 0 | 2 | 3 |
| 5 | West Germany (FRG) | 0 | 1 | 2 | 3 |
| 6 | Portugal (POR) | 0 | 1 | 1 | 2 |
| 6 | United States (USA) | 0 | 1 | 1 | 2 |
| 8 | Finland (FIN) | 0 | 1 | 0 | 1 |
| Totals (8 entries) | | 7 | 7 | 6 | 20 |
