= Al Slater =

Al Slater may refer to:

- Al Slater (powerlifter), Canadian Paralympic powerlifter
- Alistair Slater (1956–1984), British Army soldier
- Alistair Slater (cyclist) (born 1993), British cyclist
