= Wrestling at the 1984 Summer Paralympics =

Wrestling at the VII Paralympic Games
- Paralympic Wrestling

Paralympic symbol (1988-1994)

Wrestling at the 1984 Summer Paralympics consisted of at least nine events for men. Records from reliable sources mention other wrestling medalists beyond those shown here. Research has revealed that, at these Games in a number of sports, many medals were awarded for events that don’t appear in the official results.

== Medal summary ==
Event	Gold	Silver	Bronze
Men's 48 kg	Wayne Bell; Canada	Shaible; United States	
Men's 52 kg	Darly Podacheenie; United States	Chris Gabriel; Canada	
Men's 57 kg	Ken Sparks; United States	Gord Hope; Canada	
Men's 62 kg	Keith West; United States	Pier Morten; Canada	Rolando Vazquez; Mexico
Men's 68 kg	Eddie Morten; Canada	Winford Haynes; United States	
Men's 74 kg	Jack Gibbs; United States	Frank DiPierdomenico; Canada	
Men's 82 kg	George Morris; United States	Wayne Prymych; Canada	
Men's 90 kg	Garland Burress; United States	Dave Duncan; Canada	
Men's 100 kg	James Mastro; United States	Ernst Wurnig; Austria	
