= Goalball at the 1984 Summer Paralympics =

Goalball at the VII Paralympic Games
- Paralympic Goalball

Paralympic symbol (1988-1994)

Goalball at the 1984 Summer Paralympics consisted of men's and women's team events.

== Medal summary ==
Event	Gold	Silver	Bronze
Men	United States (USA) John Cutliff; Winford Haynes; Reni Jackson; George Morris; James Neppl; Kevin Szott	Egypt (EGY)	Yugoslavia (YUG)
Women	United States (USA) Norma (Brown) Mawhinney; Catherine (Brown) Farnes; Angie (Garlick) Green; Karen (Helmacy) Zabel; Tonia (McHugh) Walters; Janet (Rowley) Cebula	Canada (CAN)	Denmark (DEN)
