= Frykman =

Frykman is a surname. Notable people with the surname include:

- Anna-Lisa Frykman (1889–1960), Swedish composer, song lyricist, and teacher
- John Frykman (1932–2017), American Lutheran minister and psychotherapist
- Gösta Frykman (1909–1974), Swedish Army officer
- Götrik Frykman (1891–1944), Swedish bandy player and footballer
- Nils Frykman (1842–1911), Swedish teacher, evangelist, and hymnwriter
- Per Frykman (born 1964), Swedish paralympic equestrian
