= Athletics at the 1984 Summer Paralympics – Men's marathon 1C =

Men's marathon 1C at the VII Paralympic Games
- Paralympic Athletics
- Competitors: 9 from 6 nations

Medalists
1st place, gold medalist(s)		Alan Dufty	Australia
2nd place, silver medalist(s)		Dino Wallen	United States
3rd place, bronze medalist(s)		Eduardo Monsalvo	Mexico

The Men's marathon 1C was a wheelchair marathon event in athletics at the 1984 Summer Paralympics. The race was won by Alan Dufty.

== Results ==
Place	Athlete	Time
1	Alan Dufty (AUS)	2:51:18
2	Dino Wallen (USA)	2:54:18
3	Eduardo Monsalvo (MEX)	3:00:37
4	Werner Kaiser (SUI)	3:12:13
5	R. Zeyher (FRG)	3:13:12
-	West Brownlow (USA)	dnf
-	J. Hayes (USA)	dnf
-	D. Goodman (USA)	dnf
-	Dennis Miller (NZL)	dnf

== See also ==
- Marathon at the Paralympics
