= Powerlifting at the 1984 Summer Paralympics =

Powerlifting at the VII Paralympic Games
- Paralympic Powerlifting

Paralympic symbol (1988–1994)

Powerlifting at the 1984 Summer Paralympics consisted of seven events for men.

== Medal summary ==
Event	Gold	Silver	Bronze
Men's 52 kg	Alfred Dore; United States	Anthony Griffin; Great Britain	
Men's 60 kg	Dean Houle; United States	Patrick Fornet; France	
Men's 60 kg	Dean Houle; United States	Didier Menage; France	
Men's 67.5 kg	Michel Abalain; France		
Men's 75 kg	Jonas Oman; Sweden	Juan Dixon; United States	Keith Bell; Great Britain
Men's 82.5 kg	Roland Isaksson; Sweden	Al Slater; Canada	Tom Becke; United States
Men's 90 kg	Daniel Hardy; France	Gino Vendetti; Canada	
Men's +90 kg	Charles Reid; United States	Manfred Atteneder; Austria	
