= W. Ross Macdonald School =

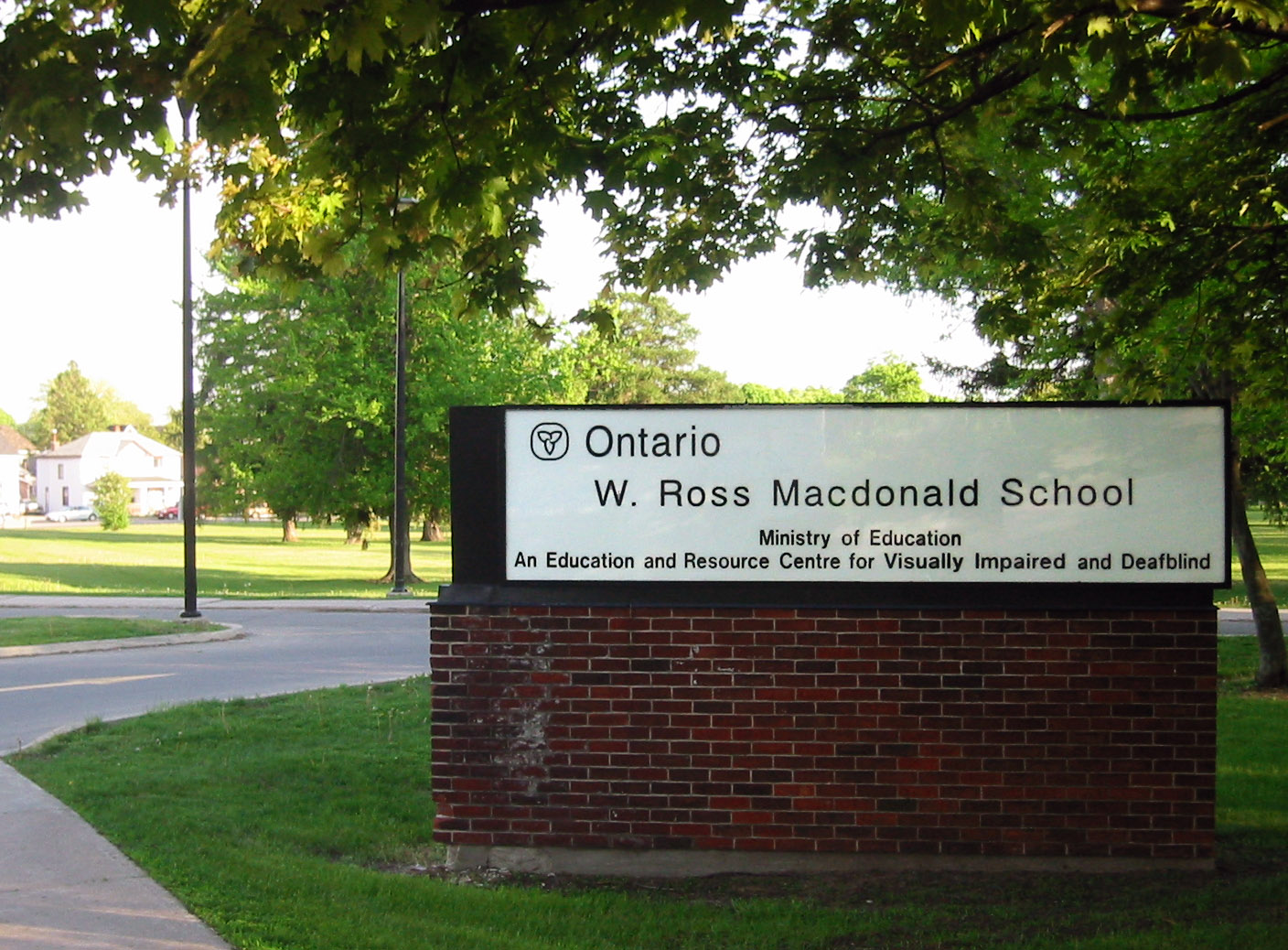

Location
- 350 Brant Avenue; Brantford, Ontario, N3T 3J9; Canada; 43.15257°N 80.2844°W

Information
- School type: Public Day/Boarding Co-Ed for blind, visually impaired and deafblind students
- Motto: "The Impossible is only the Untried"
- Founded: 1872 as "Ontario Institution for the Education of the Blind"
- Oversight: Ministry of Education
- Principal: Daniel Maggiacomo
- Grades: kindergarten-12
- Enrollment: 200
- Language: English
- Website: wrms.pdsbnet.ca

The W. Ross Macdonald School was founded as the Ontario Institution for the Education of the Blind in March 1872 in Brantford, Ontario, Canada. Its first principal was Ezekiel Stone Wiggins.

It provides instruction from kindergarten to secondary school graduation for blind and deafblind students.

W. Ross Macdonald is the only school in Ontario for blind and deafblind students and the only such school in Canada serving academic students. It draws students from across Ontario and other provinces and has residences to accommodate those that do not live in the local area. Placement at W. Ross Macdonald is a decision made by students, parents and their local school board, when it is decided that such an environment would be the best option at that time. In addition to their own students, the school provides services to District School Boards for students who are blind or Deafblind through Short Term Programs and Vision and Deafblind Resource Consultants. All services are provided free of charge for both parents and school boards.

The school was originally named the Ontario Institution for the Education of the Blind when it opened in 1872, and later called the Ontario School for the Blind. It was given its current name in 1974 in honour of Brantford citizen William Ross Macdonald, who served as Lieutenant Governor of Ontario from 1968 to 1974.

Students receive instruction in all areas of the Expanded Core Curriculum, according to individual student need. This instruction is supported by student support staff after school for those students who reside at the school from Monday to Friday. All students return home each weekend. Day programming starts at Junior Kindergarten, with accommodation offered on campus for students when it is deemed they have maturity to benefit.

The school's motto is "The Impossible is only the Untried".

== Special features ==
In recent years, a concerted effort has been made to provide landmarks in the physical layout of the newer buildings, to aid students in navigation. A variety of materials and textures are used in the building floors and walls to allow for more efficient orientation. The classroom windows are above eye-level of the students in order to provide indirect light because students with a vision impairment can find direct lighting difficult. Artificial lighting uses special lights with dimmer switch. As well, student lockers are larger than conventional school lockers and include seating.

== Superintendents ==
- Ezekiel Stone Wiggins (1872)
- J.H. Hunter (1874)
- A.H. Dymond (1881)
- H.F. Gardiner (1903)
- C.W. James (1916)
- W.B. Race (1917)
- W.H. Little (1933)
- H.J. Vallentyne (1935)
- S.E. Armstrong (1956)
- G.C. Whetstone (1972)
- David A. Neill (1977)
- Clive. J. Hodder (1991)
- Nancy Sanders (2006)
- Kevin Cutler (2010)
- Suzanne Moffat (2013)
- Ginette Faubert (2015)

== Notable alumni ==
- Molly Burke
- Priscilla Gagné
- Jeff Healey
- William Morgan
- W.G. Raymond
- Timothy McIsaac
- Eddie Morten
- Pier Morten
