= Equestrian events at the 1984 Summer Paralympics =

Equestrian at the VII Paralympic Games
- Paralympic Equestrian

Paralympic symbol (1988-1994)

Equestrian sports at the 1984 Summer Paralympics consisted of twelve demonstration events. All events were mixed, meaning that men and women competed together.

Equestrian had a combined class for spinal cord injuries and Les Autres at the 1984 Summer Paralympics, with the competition being held in Texas. There were 16 total competitors, with three having spinal cord injuries, two having multiple sclerosis, two with other neurological impairments, and nine others.

== Medal summary ==
Event	Gold	Silver	Bronze
Dressage - Advanced walk/trot C3/6	Torben Anton Hansen; Denmark	Steve Roloff; United States	
Dressage - Advanced walk/trot C4-5	Bertil Andreasen; Sweden	Cynthia Good; United States	Chene la Rochelle; Canada
Dressage - Advanced walk/trot C7	Hans Lykkestrig Nielsen; Denmark	Tom Pedersen; Norway	
Dressage - Elementary/advanced walk C3	Wendy Shugal; United States	Tim Saxton; United States	
Dressage - Elementary walk C1-2	Tim Saxton; United States	Arlene Aikenhead; Canada	Tim Hamilton; Canada
Dressage - Elementary walk/trot C3/6	Steve Roloff; United States	Wendy Shugal; United States	
Dressage - Elementary walk/trot C4-5	Jane Stidever; Great Britain	Cynthia Good; United States	Chene la Rochelle; Canada
Inst level test 1 open	Kurt Krueger; United States	Susan Ragowski; United States	Per Trykman; Sweden
Obstacle course - Relay race open	Denmark (DEN); Torben Anton Hansen; Hans Lykkestrig Nielsen	Norway (NOR) ? Tom Pedersen	United States (USA); Susan Ragowski; Wendy Shugal
Obstacle course - Walk C1-3	Tim Saxton; United States	Tim Hamilton; Canada	Arlene Aikenhead; Canada
Obstacle course - Walk/trot C4-8	Hans Lykkestrig Nielsen; Denmark	Cynthia Good; United States	Torben Anton Hansen; Denmark
Training level test 1 open	Per Trykman; Sweden	Hans Lykkestrig Nielsen; Denmark	Torben Anton Hansen; Denmark
