= Akenhead =

Akenhead is a surname. Notable people with the surname include:

- James Akenhead (born 1983), English poker player
- Robert Akenhead (born 1949), English judge

== See also ==
- Aikenhead
