= Boccia at the 1988 Summer Paralympics =

Boccia at the VIII Paralympic Games
- Paralympic Boccia
- Venue: Jeonglip Rehabilitation Center
- Dates: 17 to 21 October

Paralympic symbol (1988-1994)

Boccia at the 1988 Summer Paralympics consisted of three events.

== Medal table ==
* Host nation (South Korea)

| Rank | Nation | Gold | Silver | Bronze | Total |
|---|---|---|---|---|---|
| 1 | South Korea (KOR) | 1 | 2 | 0 | 3 |
| 2 | Portugal (POR) | 1 | 0 | 2 | 3 |
| 3 | Ireland (IRL) | 1 | 0 | 0 | 1 |
| 4 | Denmark (DEN) | 0 | 1 | 1 | 2 |
| Totals (4 entries) | | 3 | 3 | 3 | 9 |

== Medal summary ==
| Event | Gold | Silver | Bronze |
|---|---|---|---|
| Mixed individual C1 | Yun Kang-no; South Korea | Henrik Jorgensen; Denmark | João Alves; Portugal |
| Mixed individual C2 | Thomas Leahy; Ireland | Lee Jin-woo; South Korea | Fernando Ferreira; Portugal |
| Mixed team C1–C2 | Portugal (POR); João Alves; António Marques; Maria Melo | South Korea (KOR); Choi Koh-dong; Jung Yu-seok; Yun Kang-no | Denmark (DEN); Lone Bak-Pedersen; Henrik Jorgensen; Mansoor Siddiqi |
