= Boccia at the 1992 Summer Paralympics =

Boccia at the IX Paralympic Games
- Paralympic Boccia

Paralympic symbol (1988-1994)

Boccia at the 1992 Summer Paralympics consisted of three events.

== Medal summary ==
Event	Gold	Silver	Bronze
Mixed individual C1	Antonio Cid; Spain	James Thomson; United States	Henrik Jorgensen; Denmark
Mixed individual C2	Lee Jin-woo; South Korea	Fernando Ferreira; Portugal	Lim Shin-hyuk; South Korea
Mixed team C1–C2	Spain (ESP); Manuel Fernandez; Daniel Outeiro; Juan Tellechea; Antonio Cid	Denmark (DEN); Henrik Jorgensen; Mansoor Siddiqi; Lone Bak-Pedersen; Tove Jacobsen	Ireland (IRL); Martin McDonagh; Thomas Leahy; Jason Kearney; William Johnston

=== Medal table ===
Rank	Nation	Gold	Silver	Bronze	Total
1	Spain (ESP)	2	0	0	2
2	South Korea (KOR)	1	0	1	2
3	Denmark (DEN)	0	1	1	2
4	Portugal (POR)	0	1	0	1
4	United States (USA)	0	1	0	1
6	Ireland (IRL)	0	0	1	1
Totals (6 entries)		3	3	3	9
