= Henrik Jorgensen (Paralympian) =

Medal record

Representing Denmark

Paralympic Games

Para athletics (track & field)
Gold medal – first place	1984 New York/ Stoke Mandeville	Precision Throw - C1
Gold medal – first place	1984 New York/ Stoke Mandeville	Slalom - C1
Gold medal – first place	1988 Seoul	Slalom - C1

Boccia
Gold medal – first place	1984 New York/ Stoke Mandeville	Individual - C1
Silver medal – second place	1988 Seoul	Individual - C1
Silver medal – second place	1992 Barcelona	Team - C1-C2
Silver medal – second place	1996 Atlanta	Individual - C1
Bronze medal – third place	1988 Seoul	Team - C1-C2
Bronze medal – third place	1992 Barcelona	Individual - C1

Henrik Jorgensen is a Danish Paralympic athlete and boccia player who has competed in five Paralympic Games.

== Career ==
Henrik made his Paralympic debut in 1984, competing in athletics and boccia. In New York/Stoke Mandeville 1984 he won three gold medals, the men's slalom and precision throw and individual boccia C1. In 1984, boccia was making its Paralympics debut, so he became one of its first champions. In the boccia, he beat Russell Cecchini of Canada in the final. Starting from Seoul 1988 he moved into boccia permanently and became a master player, winning three silver and two bronze medals in the sport.

In Barcelona 1992, he won the individual bronze medal match against Juan Tellechea from Spain. Henrik had lost in the semifinal to James Thomson from the USA.

In Atlanta 1996, he won the silver medal in Boccia Individual C1 after losing to Hae Ryung Kim from South Korea.

After missing the Sydney 2000 Paralympics, he returned for Athens 2004, but failed to medal. In the Individual Event, he lost in the quarter-final. In the Team Event, he didn't make it into the finals. It was his last Paralympics to date.
