= Athletics at the 1984 Summer Paralympics – Women's 100 metres L3 =

Women's 100 metres L3 at the VII Paralympic Games
- Paralympic Athletics
- Competitors: 1 from 1 nation

Medalists
1st place, gold medalist(s)		Twyanna Caldwell	United States

The Women's 100 metres L3 was a sprinting event in athletics at the 1984 Summer Paralympics. It was unusual in that only one athlete took part. Although single athlete races had not been entirely uncommon during the 1960s, they had become very rare by 1984.

As the sole competitor, Twyanna Caldwell of the United States needed only to complete the race in order to win gold. She did so in a time of 21.73s.

Rank	Athlete	Time
1st place, gold medalist(s)	Twyanna Caldwell (USA)	21.73s
2nd place, silver medalist(s)	no silver medal awarded	-
3rd place, bronze medalist(s)	no bronze medal awarded	-
