= Athletics at the 1984 Summer Paralympics – Women's 100 metres L2 =

Women's 100 metres L3 at the VII Paralympic Games
- Paralympic Athletics
- Competitors: 2 from 2 nations

Medalists
1st place, gold medalist(s)		Wilma Lawrie	Great Britain
2nd place, silver medalist(s)		Terri Dixon	United States

The Women's 100 metres L2 was a sprinting event in athletics at the 1984 Summer Paralympics. It was one of few events that year not to be contested by at least three athletes. The only two competitors were Wilma Lawrie of Great Britain and Terri Dixon of the United States. Lawrie completed the race in 24.91s to take gold, well ahead of Dixon, who obtained silver upon finishing the race in 31.13s.

Rank	Athlete	Time
1st place, gold medalist(s)	Wilma Lawrie (GBR)	24.91s
2nd place, silver medalist(s)	Terri Dixon (USA)	31.13s
3rd place, bronze medalist(s)	no bronze medal awarded	-
