= Football 7-a-side at the 1984 Summer Paralympics =

Football 7-a-side at the VII Paralympic Games
- Football 7-a-side

Paralympic symbol (1988-1994)

Football 7-a-side at the 1984 Summer Paralympics consisted of two events for men.

At the 1984 Summer Paralympics, the first cerebral palsy only sports were added to the program with the inclusion of CP football and boccia.

== Medal summary ==
| Event | Gold | Silver | Bronze |
|---|---|---|---|
| Men's CP | Belgium (BEL) | Ireland (IRL) | Great Britain (GBR); Chris Hampshire; David Chalmers; Darren Rabin; Robert Bebbington; Paul Taylor; Andrew Ferguson; Anthony Griffin; Gerard McConnell; Gordon Robertson |
| Men's wheelchair | United States (USA) | Canada (CAN) | Great Britain (GBR); Paul McGinty; Steven Varden; Norman Burns; Anne Trotman; Susan Stevenson; Carol Johnson; Anthony Honour; Alyn Haskey |

== Men's CP ==
Six teams competed in the men's CP football 7-a-side competition, Belgium won the gold medal against Ireland while Great Britain won the bronze medals after beating Portugal.

=== Preliminaries ===
Group A

| Great Britain (GBR) | 8 – 0 | United States (USA) |

| Belgium (BEL) | 10 – 0 | United States (USA) |

| Belgium (BEL) | 3 – 1 | Great Britain (GBR) |

Group B

| Canada (CAN) | 0 – 0 | Portugal (POR) |

| Ireland (IRL) | 7 – 0 | Canada (CAN) |

| Ireland (IRL) | 3 – 0 | Portugal (POR) |

=== Bronze medal match ===
| Great Britain (GBR) | 3 – 1 | Portugal (POR) |

=== Gold medal match ===
| Belgium (BEL) | 1 – 0 | Ireland (IRL) |

== Men's wheelchair ==
Three teams competed in the men's wheelchair football competition, the United States won the gold medal after winning against Canada and Great Britain who got the silver and bronze medals respectively.

| United States (USA) | 6 – 4 | Great Britain (GBR) |

| Canada (CAN) | 6 – 1 | Great Britain (GBR) |

| United States (USA) | 4 – 1 | Canada (CAN) |
