= Boccia at the 1984 Summer Paralympics =

Boccia at the VII Paralympic Games
- Paralympic Boccia

Paralympic symbol (1988-1994)

Boccia at the 1984 Summer Paralympics consisted of five events.

At the 1984 Summer Paralympics, the first cerebral palsy only sports were added to the program with the inclusion of CP football and boccia.

== Medal summary ==
Event	Gold	Silver	Bronze
Men's individual C1	Henrik Jorgensen; Denmark	Russell Cecchini; Canada	Terry Hudson; Great Britain
Men's individual C2	Craig Clifton; United States	Gord Hamilton; Canada	Mark Chard; Great Britain
Women's individual C1	Carol Johnson; Great Britain	Candy Demarois; United States	Debbie Willows; Canada
Women's individual C2	Nancy Anderson; United States	Diane Wiscombe; Great Britain	Jane Spitzley; United States
Mixed team	Portugal (POR); António Baltazar; Maria Helena Martins; António José Mateus	Great Britain (GBR); Carol Johnson; Alin Kerwin; Paula Monzani	United States (USA); Nancy Anderson; Craig Clifton; Candy Demarois
