= United States at the 1984 Summer Paralympics =

- Flag of the United States
- IPC code: USA
- NPC: United States Paralympic Committee
- Website: www.teamusa.org/US-Paralympics

in Stoke Mandeville/New York
- Medals Ranked 1st: Gold 137 Silver 131 Bronze 129 Total 397

Summer Paralympics appearances (overview)
- 1960; 1964; 1968; 1972; 1976; 1980; 1984; 1988; 1992; 1996; 2000; 2004; 2008; 2012; 2016; 2020; 2024

The United States sent a delegation to compete at the 1984 Summer Paralympics in Stoke Mandeville, United Kingdom and New York City, United States of America. Its athletes finished first in the gold and overall medal count.

The 15 members of the United States Paralympic team at the 1984 Summer Paralympics in Les Autres classes included four people with muscular dystrophy, two with multiple sclerosis, two with Friedreich's ataxia, one with arthrogryposis, three with osteogenesis imperfecta, and one with short stature.

At the 1984 Games, Great Britain won the most medals among all Les Autres events. They claimed 55. Spain was second with 38 and the United States was third with 26.

== Medalists ==
=== Gold medalists ===
Medal	Name	Sport	Event
Gold	Susan Hagel	Archery	Women's double FITA round paraplegic
Gold	J. Lewellyn	Athletics	Men's 100m 1A
Gold	D. Barret	Athletics	Men's 100m 5
Gold	Jim Martinson	Athletics	Men's 100m A1-3
Gold	Winford Haynes	Athletics	Men's 100m B1
Gold	Paul Smith	Athletics	Men's 100m B3
Gold	John Sacco	Athletics	Men's 100m C5
Gold	Scott Schneider	Athletics	Men's 100m L2
Gold	Dino Wallen	Athletics	Men's 200m 1C
Gold	Kris Lenzo	Athletics	Men's 400m A1-3
Gold	Winford Haynes	Athletics	Men's 400m B1
Gold	D. Goodman	Athletics	Men's 800m 1C
Gold	Tom Foran	Athletics	Men's 5000m 5
Gold	Leamon Stansell	Athletics	Men's 5000m B3
Gold	Men's relay team	Athletics	Men's 4 × 100 m relay 1A-1C
Gold	Ronnie Alsup	Athletics	Men's high jump A4
Gold	Ronnie Alsup	Athletics	Men's long jump A4
Gold	Paul Smith	Athletics	Men's long jump B3
Gold	Garland Burress	Athletics	Men's triple jump B3
Gold	Bart Dodson	Athletics	Men's club throw 1A
Gold	J. Sampaga	Athletics	Men's discus throw 3
Gold	Richard Gould	Athletics	Men's discus throw A1
Gold	David Bowers	Athletics	Men's discus throw A2
Gold	Antoine Archie	Athletics	Men's discus throw A4
Gold	Robert Hoskins	Athletics	Men's discus throw A9
Gold	Leroy Franks	Athletics	Men's discus throw B1
Gold	Todd Hodgin	Athletics	Men's discus throw B2
Gold	Tom Becke	Athletics	Men's discus throw C8
Gold	Douglas Heir	Athletics	Men's javelin throw 1B
Gold	John Jerome	Athletics	Men's javelin throw A1
Gold	Antoine Archie	Athletics	Men's javelin throw A4
Gold	Tom Becke	Athletics	Men's javelin throw C8
Gold	Douglas Heir	Athletics	Men's shot put 1B
Gold	Robert Hoskins	Athletics	Men's shot put A9
Gold	James Neppl	Athletics	Men's shot put B1
Gold	James Mastro	Athletics	Men's shot put B2
Gold	Tom Becke	Athletics	Men's shot put C8
Gold	Tom Cush	Athletics	Men's medicine ball thrust C2
Gold	Tom Cush	Athletics	Men's slalom (leg) C2
Gold	Ron Mullis	Athletics	Men's slalom C3
Gold	Eric Owens	Athletics	Men's slalom C4
Gold	Bart Dodson	Athletics	Men's pentathlon 1A
Gold	Nancy Anderson	Athletics	Women's 20m (arm) C2
Gold	Youlanda Barker	Athletics	Women's 60m A1-3
Gold	J. Mora	Athletics	Women's 100m 1B
Gold	Beth Bishop	Athletics	Women's 100m B3
Gold	Kathy Kessler	Athletics	Women's 100m C5
Gold	Twyanna Caldwell	Athletics	Women's 100m L3
Gold	J. Mora	Athletics	Women's 200m 1B
Gold	Youlanda Barker	Athletics	Women's 200m A1-3
Gold	J. Mora	Athletics	Women's 400m 1B
Gold	Beth Bishop	Athletics	Women's 400m B3
Gold	Lori Bennett	Athletics	Women's 800m B1
Gold	Wanda Watts	Athletics	Women's 800m B3
Gold	Susan Moucha	Athletics	Women's 1000m cross country C7
Gold	S. Norman	Athletics	Women's 5000m 4
Gold	Jayne Schiff	Athletics	Women's marathon 2
Gold	Women's relay team	Athletics	Women's 4 × 200 m relay 2-5
Gold	Janet Rowley	Athletics	Women's high jump B2
Gold	Melba Houghton	Athletics	Women's high jump B3
Gold	Joan Blalark	Athletics	Women's club throw C4
Gold	Kathryne Lynne Carlton	Athletics	Women's discus throw 4
Gold	Karen Farmer	Athletics	Women's discus throw A4
Gold	Janet Rowley	Athletics	Women's discus throw B2
Gold	Cecelia Pierce	Athletics	Women's discus throw C3
Gold	Ann Marie Roberts	Athletics	Women's discus throw C8
Gold	Maureen Gaynor	Athletics	Women's distance throw C1
Gold	Karen Helmacy	Athletics	Women's javelin throw B2
Gold	Lori Johnson	Athletics	Women's javelin throw B3
Gold	Karen Farmer	Athletics	Women's shot put A4
Gold	Janet Rowley	Athletics	Women's shot put B2
Gold	Ann Marie Roberts	Athletics	Women's shot put C8
Gold	Ruth Rosenbaum	Athletics	Women's slalom 1B
Gold	Maureen Gaynor	Athletics	Women's slalom C1
Gold	Nancy Anderson	Athletics	Women's slalom C2
Gold	Kathryne Lynne Carlton	Athletics	Women's pentathlon 4
Gold	Mixed relay team	Athletics	Mixed 3x60m relay C2-3
Gold	Craig Clifton	Boccia	Men's individual C2
Gold	Nancy Anderson	Boccia	Women's individual C2
Gold	Wendy Shugal	Equestrian	Dressage - elementary/advanced walk C3
Gold	Tim Saxton	Equestrian	Dressage - elementary walk C1-2
Gold	Steve Roloff	Equestrian	Dressage - elementary walk/trot C3/6
Gold	Kurt Krueger	Equestrian	Inst level test 1 open
Gold	Tim Saxton	Equestrian	Obstacle course - walk C1-3
Gold	Men's football team	Football 7-a-side	Men's wheelchair
Gold	Men's goalball team	Goalball	Men's team
Gold	Women's goalball team	Goalball	Women's team
Gold	Alfred Dore	Powerlifting	Men's 52 kg
Gold	Dean Houle	Powerlifting	Men's 60 kg
Gold	Charles Reid	Powerlifting	Men's +90 kg
Gold	Roger Withrow	Shooting	Men's air rifle prone 2-6
Gold	S. Green	Swimming	Men's 25m butterfly 1B
Gold	Rick Resa	Swimming	Men's 25m freestyle with aids C1
Gold	Mike Bowen	Swimming	Men's 25m freestyle with aids C2
Gold	Robert Hatcher	Swimming	Men's 50m breaststroke B3
Gold	Charles Mowery	Swimming	Men's 50m breaststroke C8
Gold	Rodney Hyder	Swimming	Men's 50m freestyle C1
Gold	Robert Hatcher	Swimming	Men's 50m freestyle B3
Gold	John Morgan	Swimming	Men's 100m butterfly B2
Gold	John Morgan	Swimming	Men's 100m freestyle B2
Gold	John Morgan	Swimming	Men's 200m individual medley B2
Gold	John Morgan	Swimming	Men's 400m freestyle B2
Gold	John Morgan	Swimming	Men's 400m individual medley B2
Gold	Men's relay team	Swimming	Men's 4 × 100 m freestyle relay B1-B3
Gold	Jean Witters	Swimming	Women's 50m breaststroke B2
Gold	Marie Vanliere	Swimming	Women's 50m breaststroke B3
Gold	M. Bevard	Swimming	Women's 50m butterfly 4
Gold	Lori Johnson	Swimming	Women's 50m freestyle B3
Gold	M. Bevard	Swimming	Women's 100m backstroke 4
Gold	Trischa Zorn	Swimming	Women's 100m backstroke B2
Gold	Barbara Eiler	Swimming	Women's 100m backstroke B3
Gold	M. Bevard	Swimming	Women's 100m breaststroke 4
Gold	Cheryl Anderson	Swimming	Women's 100m breaststroke A1
Gold	Jan Wilson	Swimming	Women's 100m breaststroke A2
Gold	Vurah Runyon	Swimming	Women's 100m breaststroke B2
Gold	Trischa Zorn	Swimming	Women's 100m butterfly B2
Gold	Barbara Eiler	Swimming	Women's 100m butterfly B3
Gold	M. Bevard	Swimming	Women's 100m freestyle 4
Gold	Trischa Zorn	Swimming	Women's 100m freestyle B2
Gold	Barbara Eiler	Swimming	Women's 100m freestyle B3
Gold	Cheryl Anderson	Swimming	Women's 200m individual medley A1
Gold	Trischa Zorn	Swimming	Women's 200m individual medley B2
Gold	Barbara Eiler	Swimming	Women's 200m individual medley B3
Gold	Cathy Schmitt	Swimming	Women's 400m breaststroke B3
Gold	M. Bevard	Swimming	Women's 400m freestyle 4
Gold	Trischa Zorn	Swimming	Women's 400m individual medley B2
Gold	Cathy Schmitt	Swimming	Women's 400m individual medley B3
Gold	M. Bevard	Swimming	Women's 4x50m individual medley 4
Gold	Women's relay team	Swimming	Women's 4 × 100 m medley relay B1-B3
Gold	Darly Podacheenie	Wrestling	Men's 52 kg
Gold	Ken Sparks	Wrestling	Men's 57 kg
Gold	Keith West	Wrestling	Men's 62 kg
Gold	Jack Gibbs	Wrestling	Men's 74 kg
Gold	George Morris	Wrestling	Men's 82 kg
Gold	Garland Burress	Wrestling	Men's 90 kg
Gold	James Mastro	Wrestling	Men's 100 kg

=== Silver medalists ===
Medal	Name	Sport	Event
Silver	Tom Cush	Athletics	Men's 60m C2
Silver	Doug Harris	Athletics	Men's 60m L1
Silver	Dino Wallen	Athletics	Men's 100m 1C
Silver	Kris Lenzo	Athletics	Men's 100m A1-3
Silver	Ira Rankin	Athletics	Men's 100m A6
Silver	Dean Houle	Athletics	Men's 100m C5
Silver	Bill Lehr	Athletics	Men's 100m L3
Silver	Bart Dodson	Athletics	Men's 200m 1A
Silver	D. Barret	Athletics	Men's 200m 5
Silver	Tom Cush	Athletics	Men's 200m C2
Silver	J. Lewellyn	Athletics	Men's 400m 1A
Silver	N. Jorgensen	Athletics	Men's 400m 1B
Silver	D. Goodman	Athletics	Men's 400m 1C
Silver	Randy Snow	Athletics	Men's 400m 4
Silver	D. Barret	Athletics	Men's 400m 5
Silver	Lonzey Jenkins	Athletics	Men's 400m B1
Silver	Scott Schneider	Athletics	Men's 400m L2
Silver	Bill Lehr	Athletics	Men's 400m L3
Silver	J. Lewellyn	Athletics	Men's 800m 1A
Silver	Randy Snow	Athletics	Men's 800m 4
Silver	Jim Martinson	Athletics	Men's 800m A1-3
Silver	Leamon Stansell	Athletics	Men's 800m B3
Silver	Bill Lehr	Athletics	Men's 800m L3
Silver	George Murray	Athletics	Men's 5000m 3
Silver	Dino Wallen	Athletics	Men's marathon 1C
Silver	B. Hedrick	Athletics	Men's marathon 5
Silver	Men's relay team	Athletics	Men's 4 × 100 m relay 2-5
Silver	Paul Smith	Athletics	Men's triple jump B3
Silver	James Mastro	Athletics	Men's discus throw B2
Silver	Eric Owens	Athletics	Men's discus throw C4
Silver	Robert Gordon	Athletics	Men's discus throw C5
Silver	Shaun Graham	Athletics	Men's discus throw L4
Silver	Claude Prophete	Athletics	Men's distance throw C1
Silver	Tom Cush	Athletics	Men's distance C2
Silver	J. Sampaga	Athletics	Men's javelin throw 3
Silver	Reni Jackson	Athletics	Men's javelin throw B2
Silver	S. Wilkins	Athletics	Men's shot put 1A
Silver	J. Zajac	Athletics	Men's shot put 4
Silver	John Jerome	Athletics	Men's shot put A1
Silver	Todd Hodgin	Athletics	Men's shot put B2
Silver	Kevin Szott	Athletics	Men's shot put B3
Silver	Tony Worley	Athletics	Men's shot put L1
Silver	Shaun Graham	Athletics	Men's shot put L4
Silver	D. Barret	Athletics	Men's King of the straight 100m 1A-6
Silver	Ted Judge	Athletics	Men's slalom C1
Silver	Mike Bowen	Athletics	Men's slalom C2
Silver	Rene Rivera	Athletics	Men's slalom C3
Silver	Douglas Heir	Athletics	Men's pentathlon 1B
Silver	Terri Feinstein	Athletics	Women's 60m C2
Silver	Glee Lyford	Athletics	Women's 100m 2
Silver	Karen Farmer	Athletics	Women's 100m A4
Silver	Lori Bennett	Athletics	Women's 100m B1
Silver	Kimala Searcy	Athletics	Women's 100m C4
Silver	Deborah Hearn	Athletics	Women's 100m C8
Silver	Terri Dixon	Athletics	Women's 100m L2
Silver	Terri Feinstein	Athletics	Women's 200m C2
Silver	Elizabeth Fleming	Athletics	Women's 200m C3
Silver	B. Moore	Athletics	Women's 400m 2
Silver	Karen Farmer	Athletics	Women's 400m A4
Silver	Kimala Searcy	Athletics	Women's 400m C4
Silver	Terri Dixon	Athletics	Women's 400m L2
Silver	J. Mora	Athletics	Women's 800m 1C
Silver	Jayne Schiff	Athletics	Women's 800m 2
Silver	Kimala Searcy	Athletics	Women's 800m C4
Silver	Ann Marie Roberts	Athletics	Women's 1000m cross country C8
Silver	B. Moore	Athletics	Women's 1500m 2
Silver	B. Moore	Athletics	Women's 5000m 2
Silver	Women's relay team	Athletics	Women's 4 × 100 m relay 2-5
Silver	Women's relay team	Athletics	Women's 4 × 400 m relay 2-5
Silver	Julie Holley	Athletics	Women's high jump A6
Silver	Beth Bishop	Athletics	Women's long jump C3
Silver	Jane Spitzley	Athletics	Women's club throw C2
Silver	Manyon Lyons	Athletics	Women's discus throw C3
Silver	Joan Blalark	Athletics	Women's discus throw C4
Silver	Twyanna Caldwell	Athletics	Women's discus throw L3
Silver	Kathryne Lynne Carlton	Athletics	Women's javelin throw 4
Silver	Karen Farmer	Athletics	Women's javelin throw A4
Silver	Deborah Hearn	Athletics	Women's javelin throw C8
Silver	Mary Lou Baranski	Athletics	Women's javelin throw L2
Silver	Twyanna Caldwell	Athletics	Women's javelin throw L3
Silver	Candy Demarois	Athletics	Women's precision throw C1
Silver	Twyanna Caldwell	Athletics	Women's shot put L3
Silver	Joan Blalark	Athletics	Women's slalom C4
Silver	Candy Demarois	Boccia	Women's individual C1
Silver	Richard Lufkin	Cycling	Men's bicycle 1500m CP div 4
Silver	Steve Roloff	Equestrian	Dressage - advanced walk/trot C3/6
Silver	Cynthia Good	Equestrian	Dressage - advanced walk/trot C4-5
Silver	Tim Saxton	Equestrian	Dressage - elementary/advanced walk C3
Silver	Wendy Shugal	Equestrian	Dressage - elementary walk/trot C3/6
Silver	Cynthia Good	Equestrian	Dressage - elementary walk/trot C4-5
Silver	Susan Ragowski	Equestrian	Inst level test 1 open
Silver	Cynthia Good	Equestrian	Obstacle course - walk/trot C4-8
Silver	Juan Dixon	Powerlifting	Men's 75 kg
Silver	D. Goodman	Swimming	Men's 25m backstroke 1C
Silver	S. Green	Swimming	Men's 25m freestyle 1B
Silver	Charles Mowery	Swimming	Men's 50m backstroke C8
Silver	Keith Zoller	Swimming	Men's 50m breaststroke B1
Silver	Todd Hodgin	Swimming	Men's 50m freestyle B2
Silver	Todd Hodgin	Swimming	Men's 100m backstroke B2
Silver	Brian Hudson	Swimming	Men's 100m breaststroke B3
Silver	Dave Reynolds	Swimming	Men's 100m freestyle A3
Silver	Richard Ropka	Swimming	Men's 100m freestyle B3
Silver	Brian Hudson	Swimming	Men's 400m breaststroke B3
Silver	Robert Hatcher	Swimming	Men's 400m individual medley B3
Silver	Men's relay team	Swimming	Men's 4 × 100 m medley relay B1-B3
Silver	Nancy Anderson	Swimming	Women's 25m freestyle C2
Silver	Wendy Shugal	Swimming	Women's 25m freestyle C3
Silver	Linda Nilson	Swimming	Women's 50m backstroke C8
Silver	Norma Brown	Swimming	Women's 50m breaststroke B2
Silver	Tonia McHugh	Swimming	Women's 50m breaststroke B3
Silver	Norma Brown	Swimming	Women's 50m freestyle B2
Silver	Wendy Shugal	Swimming	Women's 50m freestyle C3
Silver	Cheryl Anderson	Swimming	Women's 100m backstroke A1
Silver	Cathy Schmitt	Swimming	Women's 100m backstroke B3
Silver	Cathy Schmitt	Swimming	Women's 100m breaststroke B3
Silver	Jan Wilson	Swimming	Women's 100m butterfly A2
Silver	Cheryl Anderson	Swimming	Women's 100m freestyle A1
Silver	Lori Johnson	Swimming	Women's 400m breaststroke B3
Silver	Women's relay team	Swimming	Women's 4x50m freestyle relay C1-C8
Silver	Women's relay team	Swimming	Women's 4 × 100 m freestyle relay A1-A9
Silver	Women's relay team	Swimming	Women's 4 × 100 m freestyle relay B1-B3
Silver	Women's relay team	Swimming	Women's 4 × 100 m medley relay A1-A9
Silver	M. Stephens	Table tennis	Men's singles L2
Silver	Marcelino Monasterial	Table tennis	Men's singles L5
Silver	Men's team	Table tennis	Men's teams 1A
Silver	J. Brown	Table tennis	Women's singles 3
Silver	Pamela Fontaine	Table tennis	Women's teams 1A-C
Silver	Donald Deutsch	Weightlifting	Men's 75 kg integrated
Silver	Charles Roedelbronn	Weightlifting	Men's 75 kg paraplegic
Silver	David Bowers	Weightlifting	Men's +95 kg integrated
Silver	Shaible	Wrestling	Men's 48 kg
Silver	Winford Haynes	Wrestling	Men's 68 kg

=== Bronze medalists ===
Medal	Name	Sport	Event
Bronze	Patrick Krishner	Archery	Men's double advanced metric round paraplegic
Bronze	Mike Bowen	Athletics	Men's 20m (arm) C2
Bronze	Rene Rivera	Athletics	Men's 60m C3
Bronze	Tony Worley	Athletics	Men's 60m L1
Bronze	J. Hayes	Athletics	Men's 100m 1C
Bronze	Waymon Ware	Athletics	Men's 100m C4
Bronze	Mark Kemp	Athletics	Men's 100m C5
Bronze	Gary Stone	Athletics	Men's 100m L2
Bronze	J. Hayes	Athletics	Men's 200m 1C
Bronze	Tom Foran	Athletics	Men's 200m 5
Bronze	Richard Simon	Athletics	Men's 200m C3
Bronze	Tom Foran	Athletics	Men's 400m 5
Bronze	Jim Martinson	Athletics	Men's 400m A1-3
Bronze	Paul Smith	Athletics	Men's 400m B3
Bronze	Gary Stone	Athletics	Men's 400m L2
Bronze	N. Jorgensen	Athletics	Men's 800m 1B
Bronze	J. Rodolf	Athletics	Men's 800m 3
Bronze	Salvin Ficara	Athletics	Men's 1000m cross country C6
Bronze	Randy Snow	Athletics	Men's 1500m 4
Bronze	Leamon Stansell	Athletics	Men's 1500m B3
Bronze	J. Rodolf	Athletics	Men's 5000m 3
Bronze	Tom Foran	Athletics	Men's marathon 5
Bronze	Men's relay team	Athletics	Men's 4 × 100 m relay A4-9
Bronze	George Morris	Athletics	Men's high jump B3
Bronze	Garland Burress	Athletics	Men's long jump B3
Bronze	S. Wilkins	Athletics	Men's club throw 1A
Bronze	Rene Rivera	Athletics	Men's club throw C4
Bronze	Marvin Ross	Athletics	Men's club throw C6
Bronze	John Jerome	Athletics	Men's discus throw A1
Bronze	Jim McElhiney	Athletics	Men's discus throw A4
Bronze	Tony Worley	Athletics	Men's discus throw L1
Bronze	Scott Schneider	Athletics	Men's discus throw L2
Bronze	Richard Bryant	Athletics	Men's javelin throw A1
Bronze	Robert Hoskins	Athletics	Men's javelin throw A9
Bronze	William Fennessee	Athletics	Men's javelin throw B1
Bronze	Ted Judge	Athletics	Men's precision throw C1
Bronze	Jim McElhiney	Athletics	Men's shot put A4
Bronze	Robert Gordon	Athletics	Men's shot put C5
Bronze	Bill Hunsberger	Athletics	Men's shot put C6
Bronze	Sebastian de Francesco	Athletics	Men's slalom 1A
Bronze	Dino Wallen	Athletics	Men's pentathlon 1C
Bronze	J. Zajac	Athletics	Men's pentathlon 4
Bronze	Garland Burress	Athletics	Men's pentathlon B3
Bronze	Melody Williamson	Athletics	Women's 60m A1-3
Bronze	Elizabeth Fleming	Athletics	Women's 60m C3
Bronze	K. Holm	Athletics	Women's 100m 1A
Bronze	B. Moore	Athletics	Women's 100m 2
Bronze	K. Holm	Athletics	Women's 200m 1A
Bronze	B. Moore	Athletics	Women's 200m 2
Bronze	Melody Williamson	Athletics	Women's 200m A1-3
Bronze	Angela Davis	Athletics	Women's 200m C2
Bronze	K. Holm	Athletics	Women's 400m 1A
Bronze	Glee Lyford	Athletics	Women's 400m 2
Bronze	Cathy Brown	Athletics	Women's 400m C4
Bronze	K. Holm	Athletics	Women's 800m 1A
Bronze	B. Moore	Athletics	Women's 800m 2
Bronze	S. Norman	Athletics	Women's 800m 4
Bronze	Cathy Brown	Athletics	Women's 800m C4
Bronze	Deborah Hearn	Athletics	Women's 1000m cross country C8
Bronze	Glee Lyford	Athletics	Women's 1500m 2
Bronze	S. Norman	Athletics	Women's 1500m 4
Bronze	Wanda Watts	Athletics	Women's 1500m B3
Bronze	Maria Serrat	Athletics	Women's 3000m B2
Bronze	Jayne Schiff	Athletics	Women's 5000m 2
Bronze	S. Norman	Athletics	Women's marathon 4
Bronze	Shirley Coleman	Athletics	Women's discus throw C6
Bronze	Mary Lou Baranski	Athletics	Women's discus throw L2
Bronze	Annette Houk	Athletics	Women's javelin throw 2
Bronze	Melody Williamson	Athletics	Women's javelin throw A2
Bronze	Janet Rowley	Athletics	Women's javelin throw B2
Bronze	Deborah Hearn	Athletics	Women's shot put C8
Bronze	Mary Lou Baranski	Athletics	Women's shot put L2
Bronze	J. Dilorenzo	Athletics	Women's slalom 3
Bronze	Kathryne Lynne Carlton	Athletics	Women's slalom 4
Bronze	Cathy Brown	Athletics	Women's slalom C4
Bronze	Jane Spitzley	Boccia	Women's individual C2
Bronze	Nancy Anderson; Craig Clifton; Candy Demarois	Boccia	Mixed team
Bronze	Richard Lufkin	Cycling	Men's bicycle 5000m CP div 4
Bronze	Susan Ragowski; Wendy Shugal	Equestrian	Obstacle course - relay race open
Bronze	Melody Williamson	Lawn bowls	Women's singles A2/4
Bronze	Tom Becke	Powerlifting	Men's 82.5 kg
Bronze	West Brownlow	Shooting	Men's air pistol 1A-1C
Bronze	West Brownlow	Shooting	Men's air rifle kneeling 1A-1C
Bronze	Rick Mason	Swimming	Men's 25m breaststroke 1B
Bronze	D. Goodman	Swimming	Men's 25m breaststroke 1C
Bronze	Rick Mason	Swimming	Men's 25m butterfly 1B
Bronze	D. Goodman	Swimming	Men's 25m butterfly 1C
Bronze	Ian Jaquiss	Swimming	Men's 25m butterfly 3
Bronze	Rick Mason	Swimming	Men's 25m freestyle 1B
Bronze	D. Goodman	Swimming	Men's 25m freestyle 1C
Bronze	Bill Reilly	Swimming	Men's 25m freestyle C2
Bronze	Ian Jaquiss	Swimming	Men's 50m breaststroke 3
Bronze	Chris Hogans	Swimming	Men's 50m freestyle B2
Bronze	Steve Marossy	Swimming	Men's 50m freestyle C4
Bronze	Bill Lehr	Swimming	Men's 50m freestyle L3
Bronze	Dave Reynolds	Swimming	Men's 100m backstroke A3
Bronze	Brian Hudson	Swimming	Men's 100m backstroke B3
Bronze	Brian Hudson	Swimming	Men's 100m butterfly B3
Bronze	Steve Marossy	Swimming	Men's 100m freestyle C4
Bronze	Dave Reynolds	Swimming	Men's 200m individual medley A3
Bronze	Brian Hudson	Swimming	Men's 200m individual medley B3
Bronze	Rodney Hyder	Swimming	Men's 400m breaststroke B1
Bronze	Mark Heaphy	Swimming	Men's 400m individual medley B1
Bronze	D. Goodman	Swimming	Men's 3x25m individual medley 1C
Bronze	Mary Lou Baranski	Swimming	Women's 25m backstroke L2
Bronze	B. Smith	Swimming	Women's 25m breaststroke 1B
Bronze	B. Smith	Swimming	Women's 25m butterfly 1B
Bronze	Mary Lou Baranski	Swimming	Women's 25m freestyle L2
Bronze	Gayle Ginnish	Swimming	Women's 50m backstroke C8
Bronze	Kristy Satterfield	Swimming	Women's 50m breaststroke B3
Bronze	Jean Witters	Swimming	Women's 50m freestyle B2
Bronze	Tonia McHugh	Swimming	Women's 50m freestyle B3
Bronze	Susan Moucha	Swimming	Women's 50m freestyle C7
Bronze	Marie Vanliere	Swimming	Women's 100m backstroke B3
Bronze	Susan Moucha	Swimming	Women's 100m backstroke C7
Bronze	Linda Nilson	Swimming	Women's 100m backstroke C8
Bronze	Jan Wilson	Swimming	Women's 100m freestyle A2
Bronze	Terri Turnbull	Swimming	Women's 100m freestyle A9
Bronze	Susan Moucha	Swimming	Women's 100m freestyle C7
Bronze	Gayle Ginnish	Swimming	Women's 100m freestyle C8
Bronze	Jan Wilson	Swimming	Women's 200m individual medley A2
Bronze	Marie Vanliere	Swimming	Women's 400m breaststroke B3
Bronze	Jan Wilson	Swimming	Women's 400m freestyle A2
Bronze	Vurah Runyon	Swimming	Women's 400m freestyle B2
Bronze	Marie Vanliere	Swimming	Women's 400m individual medley B3
Bronze	B. Smith	Swimming	Women's 3x25m individual medley 1B
Bronze	Michael Dempsey	Table tennis	Men's singles 4
Bronze	M. Knutson	Weightlifting	Men's 51 kg paraplegic
Bronze	Mitchell Strickland	Weightlifting	Men's 85 kg paraplegic

== See also ==
- United States at the Paralympics
- United States at the 1984 Summer Olympics
