= Aikenhead =

Origin
- Language: Lowland Scots
- Region of origin: British Isles

Other names
- Variant forms: Akenhead, Akenhed, Aikenhed, Akinhead, Aikinhead

Aikenhead is a Scots language surname of medieval Scottish origin. Its oldest public record dates to 1372, when Robert II granted the lands of "Akynheuide" in Lanark to John de Maxwell, and in the same year, Convallus de Akinhead was recorded as witness to another land grant.

Notable people with the surname Aikenhead include:

- Arlene Aikenhead, Canadian Paralympic equestrian
- Mary Aikenhead (1787–1858), Roman Catholic nun
- Thomas Aikenhead (1676–1697), executed for blasphemy
- William Aikenhead (1842–1902), Australian politician from Tasmania

== See also ==
- Aitkenhead, surname
