= Lee Jin-woo (boccia) =

South Korean Paralympic boccia player

Personal information
- Born: 1972 (age 53–54)

Korean name
- Hangul: 이진우
- RR: I Jinu
- MR: I Chinu

Sport
- Sport: Boccia
- Disability class: BC2
Medal record
Paralympic Games
Gold medal – first place	1992 Barcelona	Individual C2
Gold medal – first place	2000 Sydney	Team BC1–BC2
Silver medal – second place	1988 Seoul	Individual C2
Silver medal – second place	2000 Sydney	Individual BC2

Lee Jin-woo (Korean: 이진우; born c. 1972) is a Paralympic boccia player of South Korea. He won a silver medal at the 1988 Summer Paralympics, a gold at the 1992 Summer Paralympics, and a gold and a silver at the 2000 Summer Paralympics.

He began playing the sport in around 1987.
