= Terry Hudson =

British Paralympic athlete

Medal record

Representing Great Britain

Paralympic Games

Men's para athletics
Silver medal – second place	1988 Seoul	Men's Slalom C1
Bronze medal – third place	1984 New York / Stoke Mandeville	Men's Slalom C1

Men's boccia
Bronze medal – third place	1984 New York / Stoke Mandeville	Men's Individual C1

Terry Hudson is a paralympic athlete from Great Britain competing mainly in category C1 events.

Terry competed in the 1984 Summer Paralympics in athletics and boccia. In Athletics, he won a bronze medal in Men's Slalom C1. In Boccia, he won another bronze medal in the Men's Individual C1 event.

He also competed in track athletics in the 1988 Summer Paralympics and won silver in his only event that year, the Men's Slalom C1, his best result at a Games.
