= Athletics at the 1984 Summer Paralympics – Women's marathon 5 =

Women's marathon 5 at the VII Paralympic Games
- Paralympic Athletics
- Competitors: 2 from 1 nation

Medalists
1st place, gold medalist(s)		Juana Soto	Mexico
2nd place, silver medalist(s)		Esperanza Belmont	Mexico

The Women's marathon 5 was a wheelchair marathon event in athletics at the 1984 Summer Paralympics. The race was won by Juana Soto. Only two athletes, both from Mexico, competed. Both reached the finish.

== Results ==
Place	Athlete	Time
1	Juana Soto (MEX)	3:04:36
2	Esperanza Belmont (MEX)	3:21:20

== See also ==
- Marathon at the Paralympics
