= Shelley Morten =

Canadian wrestler

Personal information
- Born: November 24, 1959 (age 65); Halifax, Nova Scotia
- Height: 1.63 m (5 ft 4 in)
- Weight: 57 kg (126 lb) (2012)

Sport
- Country: Canada
- Sport: Wrestling
- Club: Burnaby South
- Updated on September 1, 2012

Shelley Morten (born November 24, 1959) is a retired Canadian wrestler, current wrestling coach, and documentary film director and producer. As a competitor, Morten won gold in the Canadian Wrestling Championships three times and represented Canada at the World Wrestling Championships in 1995, placing seventh. She was BC Wrestling Women's Senior Athlete of the year 1995. After retiring from competition, Morten became a coach for the British Columbia women's wrestling team, and won the BC Blind Sports President's Award in 1999. She is a co-founder of VanWestFilm Productions, which recently released a documentary titled Wrestling With Attitude (2012) about the evolution of women's wrestling in Canada. Morten is married to deaf-blind judoka and wrestler Pier Morten, who has won four medals at the Paralympic Games.

== See also ==
- Wrestling in Canada
