= Aitkenhead =

Aitkenhead is a surname. Notable people with the surname include:

- Andy Aitkenhead (1904–1968), Canadian ice hockey player
- Decca Aitkenhead (born 1971), English journalist and writer
- John Aitkenhead (1910–1998), Scottish educationist
- Johnny Aitkenhead (1923–1987), Scottish footballer
- Walter Aitkenhead (1887–1966), Scottish footballer

== See also ==
- Aikenhead (name)
- Aitkenhead Glacier, glacier of Antarctica
