= Tim Hamilton (equestrian) =

Canadian Paralympic equestrian

Medal record
Para equestrian
Representing Canada
Paralympic Games
Silver medal – second place	1984 New York & Stoke Mandeville	Mixed Obstacle Course - Walk C1-3
Bronze medal – third place	1984 New York & Stoke Mandeville	Mixed Dressage - Elementary Walk C1-2

Tim Hamilton is a paralympic equestrian from Canada.

He competed in the 1984 Summer Paralympics and won a silver and bronze medal.
