= Stephane Lecours =

Canadian Paralympic swimmer

Personal information
- Nationality: Canadian
- Born: 1971 or 1972 (age 53–54)

Sport
- Country: Canada
- Sport: Swimming
Medal record
Swimming
Representing Canada
Paralympics
Gold medal – first place	1988 Seoul	Men's 400m freestyle A2
Gold medal – first place	1988 Seoul	Men's 100m backstroke A2
Gold medal – first place	1988 Seoul	Men's 100m breaststroke A2
Gold medal – first place	1988 Seoul	Men's 100m butterfly A2
Gold medal – first place	1988 Seoul	Men's 200m individual medley A2

Stephane Lecours (born 1971 or 1972) is a Canadian retired Paralympic swimmer. He competed at the 1988 Paralympics and won five gold medals. He is from Hearst, Ontario.
