= Mexico at the 1984 Summer Paralympics =

- IPC code: MEX
- NPC: Federacion Mexicana de Deporte

in Stoke Mandeville/New York
- Medals Ranked 25th: Gold 6 Silver 14 Bronze 17 Total 37

Summer Paralympics appearances (overview)
- 1972; 1976; 1980; 1984; 1988; 1992; 1996; 2000; 2004; 2008; 2012; 2016; 2020; 2024

Mexico sent a delegation to compete at the 1984 Summer Paralympics in Stoke Mandeville/New York. Its athletes finished twenty-fifth in the overall medal count.

== Medalists ==
Medal	Name	Sport	Event
Gold	Gregoria Gutiérrez	Athletics	Women's − discus throw 1C
Gold	Jorge Luna Zepeda	Athletics	Men's − 200m 2
Gold	Eduardo Monsalvo	Athletics	Men's − 100m 1C
Gold	Juana Soto	Athletics	Women's − marathon 5
Gold	Juana Soto	Athletics	Women's − pentathlon 5
Gold	Eusebio Valdez	Athletics	Men's − 100m 2
Silver	Esperanza Belmont	Athletics	Women's − marathon 5
Silver	Francisco de las Fuentes	Athletics	Men's − club throw 1A
Silver	Francisco de las Fuentes	Athletics	Men's − slalom 1A
Silver	Dora Elia García	Athletics	Women's − 200m 2
Silver	Gaxiola Goerne Chico	Athletics	Women's − shot put C3
Silver	Gregoria Gutiérrez	Athletics	Women's − 100m 1C
Silver	Gregoria Gutiérrez	Athletics	Women's − 200m 1C
Silver	Gregoria Gutiérrez	Athletics	Women's − 400m 1C
Silver	Gregoria Gutiérrez	Athletics	Women's − javelin throw 1C
Silver	Ignacio Juárez Domínguez	Athletics	Men's − 20 m (arm) C2
Silver	Geraldo López Rosas	Athletics	Men's − medicine ball thrust C2
Silver	Eduardo Monsalvo	Athletics	Men's − 800m 1C
Silver	Cornelio Núñez	Athletics	Men's − pentathlon 3
Silver	Juana Soto	Athletics	Women's − 5000m 5
Bronze	Ana Beatriz Cisneros	Athletics	Women's − 800m 5
Bronze	Ana Beatriz Cisneros	Athletics	Women's − pentathlon 5
Bronze	Carmen del Márquez	Athletics	Women's − 100m B3
Bronze	Dora Elia García	Athletics	Women's − marathon 2
Bronze	Gaxiola Goerne Chico	Athletics	Women's − javelin throw C3
Bronze	Gregoria Gutiérrez	Athletics	Women's − 800m 1C
Bronze	Gregoria Gutiérrez	Athletics	Women's − shot put 1C
Bronze	Gregoria Gutiérrez	Athletics	Women's − slalom 1C
Bronze	Jorge Luna Zepeda	Athletics	Men's − 100m 2
Bronze	Eduardo Monsalvo	Athletics	Men's − 400m 1C
Bronze	Eduardo Monsalvo	Athletics	Men's − marathon 1C
Bronze	A. Pérez	Athletics	Men's − pentathlon 6
Bronze	Juana Soto	Athletics	Women's − 100m 5
Bronze	Juana Soto	Athletics	Women's − 1500m 5
Bronze	Ángeles Valdez	Athletics	Women's − 400m 3
Bronze	Víctor Valdez	Athletics	Men's − -95 kg paraplegic
Bronze	Rolando Vázquez	Athletics	Men's − 62 kg

== See also ==
- 1984 Summer Paralympics
- Mexico at the 1984 Summer Olympics
