= Dino Wallen =

American paralympic athlete and swimmer

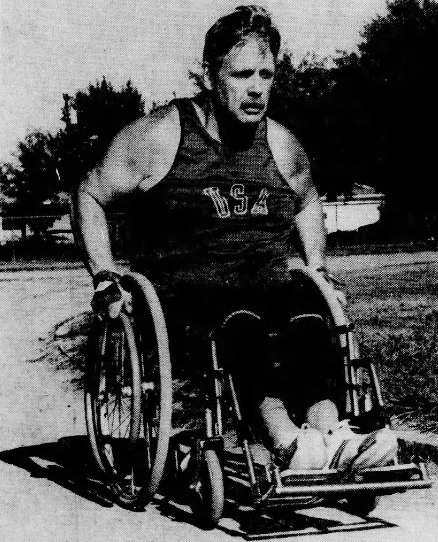
- Wallen in 1980

Personal information
- Born: February 3, 1932 Oklahoma City, Oklahoma, U.S.
- Died: March 22, 2006 (aged 74)
- Education: Oklahoma State University
- Weight: 218 lb (99 kg) (Note: Wallen weighed about 218 pounds in 1980)

Sport
- Country: United States
- Sport: Para-athletics; Swimming
Medal record
Representing United States
Paralympic Games
Para-athletics
Silver medal – second place	1980 Arnhem	Men's 4x60 m 1A-1C
Silver medal – second place	1984 Stoke Mandeville / New York	Men's 100 m 1C
Gold medal – first place	1984 Stoke Mandeville / New York	Men's 200 m 1C
Silver medal – second place	1984 Stoke Mandeville / New York	Men's marathon 1C
Bronze medal – third place	1984 Stoke Mandeville / New York	Men's pentathlon 1C
Swimming
Silver medal – second place	1980 Arnhem	Men's 3x25 m freestyle Relay 1A-1C

Dino Wallen (February 3, 1932 – March 22, 2006) was an American paralympic athlete and swimmer. He competed at the 1980 and 1984 Summer Paralympics.

== Life and career ==
Wallen was born in Oklahoma City, Oklahoma. He attended Oklahoma State University.

Wallen was a member of the San Jose Spinners Team.

Wallen competed at the 1980 Summer Paralympics, winning two silver medals in athletics and swimming. He then competed at the 1984 Summer Paralympics, winning two silver medals, a gold medal and a bronze medal in athletics.

Wallen died on March 22, 2006, at the age of 74.
