= Sandy Morgan =

Australian cricketer (born 1945)

Personal information
- Full name: Oliver John Morgan
- Born: 7 June 1945 (age 81); Brisbane, Queensland, Australia
- Nickname: Sandy
- Batting: Left-handed
- Bowling: Right-arm fast-medium
- Role: All-rounder

Domestic team information
- Years: Team
- 1965-66 to 1969-70: Queensland

Career statistics
Competition	FC	List A
Matches	37	1
Runs scored	1410	13
Batting average	25.17	13.00
100s/50s	0/6	0/0
Top score	81	13
Balls bowled	6515	64
Wickets	113	1
Bowling average	28.90	47.00
5 wickets in innings	5	0
10 wickets in match	0	0
Best bowling	6/42	1/47
Catches/stumpings	28/–	0/–
- Source: Cricinfo, 18 December 2021

Oliver John "Sandy" Morgan (born 7 June 1945) is an Australian cricketer. He played in 37 first-class matches for Queensland between 1965 and 1970.

== Early life ==
Morgan was born in Brisbane, Queensland, Australia. He attended Brisbane State High School.

== See also ==
- List of Queensland first-class cricketers
