= Dean Houle =

American paralympic athlete and powerlifter

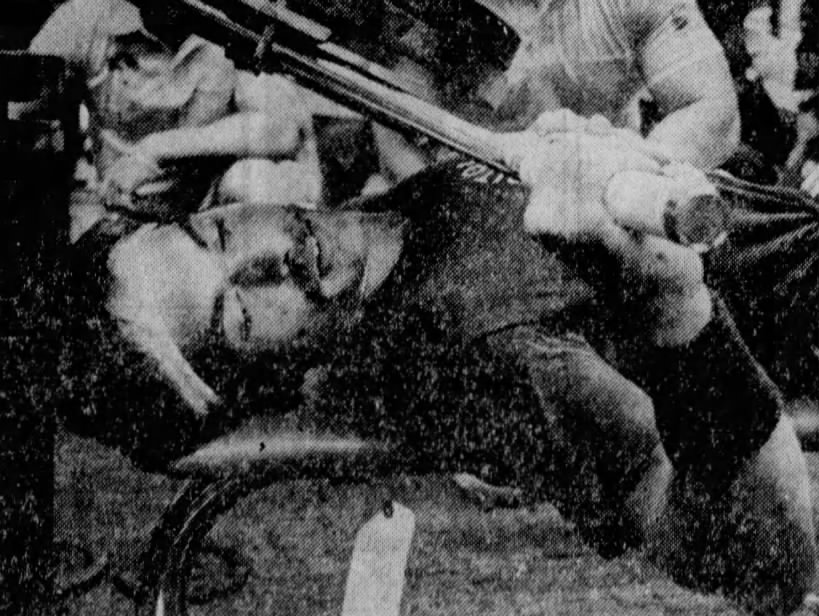
- Houle in 1983

Personal information
- Born: 1962 or 1963 (age 63–64)

Sport
- Country: United States
- Sport: Para-athletics; Powerlifting
- Disability: Cerebral palsy
Medal record
Representing United States
Paralympic Games
Para-athletics
Silver medal – second place	1984 Stoke Mandeville / New York	Men's 100 m C5
Powerlifting
Gold medal – first place	1984 Stoke Mandeville / New York	Men's 60 kg

Dean Houle (born 1962/1963) (Note: Houle was 21 years old in 1983) is an American paralympic athlete and powerlifter. He competed at the 1984 Summer Paralympics.

== Life and career ==
Houle graduated from Conard High School in 1981. (Note: Houle was a 1981 graduate of Conard High School)

Houle represented the United States at the 1984 Summer Paralympics, winning a gold and silver medal in athletics and powerlifting.
