= Per Frykman =

Paralympic equestrian from Sweden

Personal information
- Born: 1964 (age 61–62)
Medal record
Para equestrian
Representing Sweden
Paralympic Games
Gold medal – first place	1984 New York & Stoke Mandeville	Training level test 1 open
Bronze medal – third place	1984 New York & Stoke Mandeville	Inst level test 1 open

Per Frykman (born 1964) is a paralympic equestrian from Sweden.

He was a member of the riding club in Kristianstad and competed in the 1984 Summer Paralympics, where he won a gold and a bronze medal in dressage.
