= Debbie Willows =

Canadian Paralympic athlete

Personal information
- Full name: Deborah Willows
- Nickname: Debbie
- Born: 29 March 1961 (age 65) London, Ontario, Canada
- Other interests: Wrote a novel about her journey with Cerebral Paisley in 2013 titled, "Living Beyond My Circumstances: The Deborah Willows Story"≥÷

Sport
- Country: Canada
- Sport: Wheelchair Soccer, Swimming, Slalom & Boccia

Achievements and titles
- Personal best(s): Gold medal Paralympic Athlete and broke a world record in 50m Backstroke
Medal record
Representing Canada
Paralympic Games
Women's para athletics
Silver medal – second place	1984 New York / Stoke Mandeville	Precision throw C1
Bronze medal – third place	1984 New York / Stoke Mandeville	Distance throw C1
Women's boccia
Bronze medal – third place	1984 New York / Stoke Mandeville	Individual C1
Women's para swimming
Gold medal – first place	1984 New York / Stoke Mandeville	25 m Freestyle with Aids C1

Deborah Willows (born 29 March 1961) is a paralympic athlete from Canada competing mainly in category C1 events.

== Career ==
Willows competed in the 1984 Summer Paralympics in athletics, boccia and swimming. Her best result came in swimming, winning a gold medal in the Women's 25 m Freestyle with Aids C1. Her other medals came when she won bronze in the women's C1 boccia, and in distance and precision throwing events, she won bronze and silver respectively. Willows also competed in the 1988 Summer Paralympics.

== Awards and honours ==
Willows was inducted into the Canadian Cerebral Palsy Sports Association Hall of Fame in 2007.
