= Todd Hodgin =

American paralympic athlete and swimmer

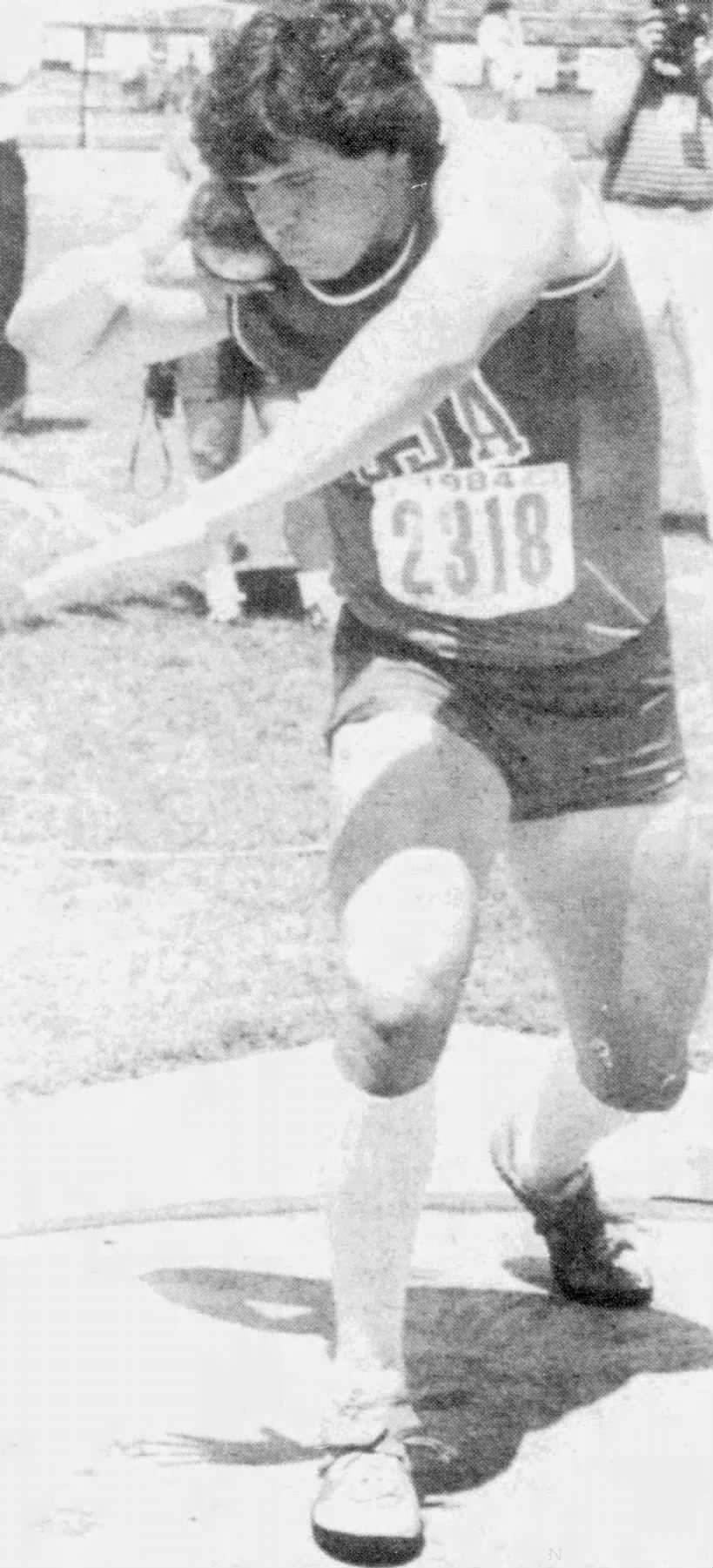
- Hodgin in 1984

Sport
- Country: United States
- Sport: Para-athletics; Swimming
- Disability class: B2 (Note: Hodgin played in B2 in discus, pentathlon and shot put)
Medal record
Representing United States
Paralympic Games
Para-athletics
Gold medal – first place	1984 Stoke Mandeville / New York	Men's discus throw B2
Silver medal – second place	1984 Stoke Mandeville / New York	Men's shot put B2
Swimming
Silver medal – second place	1984 Stoke Mandeville / New York	Men's 50 m freestyle B2
Silver medal – second place	1984 Stoke Mandeville / New York	Men's 100 m backstroke B2

Todd Hodgin is an American paralympic athlete and swimmer. He competed at the 1984 Summer Paralympics.

== Life and career ==
Hodgin graduated from Richfield High School. (Note: Hodgin was a graduate of Richfield High School)

Hodgin represented the United States at the 1984 Summer Paralympics, winning three silver medals and a gold medal in athletics and swimming.
