= Bill Lehr =

American paralympic athlete and swimmer

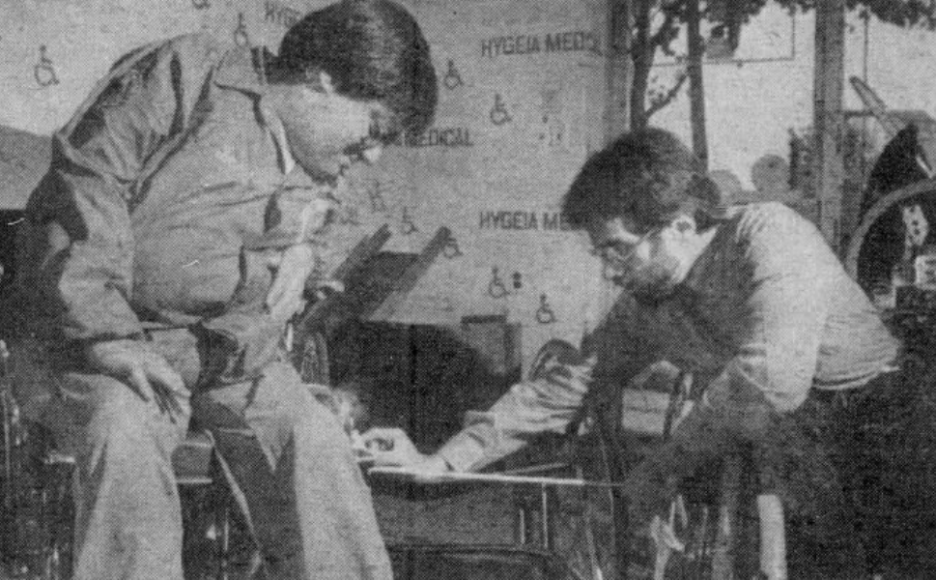
- Lehr (right) with Stuart Jacobs, 1984

Personal information
- Born: 1957 or 1958 (age 68–69)

Sport
- Country: United States
- Sport: Para-athletics; Swimming
- Disability: Osteogenesis imperfecta
Medal record
Representing United States
Paralympic Games
Para-athletics
Silver medal – second place	1984 Stoke Mandeville / New York	Men's 100 m L3
Silver medal – second place	1984 Stoke Mandeville / New York	Men's 400 m L3
Silver medal – second place	1984 Stoke Mandeville / New York	Men's 800 m L3
Swimming
Bronze medal – third place	1984 Stoke Mandeville / New York	Men's 50 m freestyle L3

Bill Lehr (born 1957/1958) (Note: Lehr was 26 years old in 1984) is an American paralympic athlete and swimmer. He competed at the 1984 and 1988 Summer Paralympics.

== Life and career ==
Lehr was born with osteogenesis imperfecta.

Lehr represented the United States at the 1984 Summer Paralympics, winning three silver medals and a bronze medal in athletics and swimming.
