= Tammy Barker =

Canadian Paralympic swimmer

Personal information
- Nationality: Canadian
- Born: 1969 or 1970 (age 55–56)

Sport
- Country: Canada
- Sport: Swimming
- Disability: Cerebral palsy
Medal record
Swimming
Representing Canada
Paralympics
Gold medal – first place	1988 Seoul	Women's 100m freestyle C4
Gold medal – first place	1988 Seoul	Women's 200m freestyle C4

Tammy Barker (born 1969 or 1970) is a Canadian retired Paralympic swimmer. She competed at the 1988 Paralympics and is from Edmonton, Alberta.
