= Chene la Rochelle =

Canadian paralympic equestrian

Medal record
Para equestrian
Representing Canada
Paralympic Games
Bronze medal – third place	1984 New York & Stoke Mandeville	Mixed Dressage - Advanced Walk/Trot C4-5
Bronze medal – third place	1984 New York & Stoke Mandeville	Mixed Dressage - Elementary Walk/Trot C4-5

Chene La Rochelle is a paralympic equestrian from Canada.

She competed in the 1984 Summer Paralympics, where she won two bronze medals in dressage.
