= Yvette Michel =

Canadian Paralympic swimmer

Personal information
- Nationality: Canadian
- Born: 1965 (age 60–61) Vancouver, British Columbia, Canada

Sport
- Country: Canada
- Sport: Swimming
Medal record
Athletics at the Summer Paralympics
Representing Canada
Paralympics
| Gold medal – first place | 1980 Arnhem | Women's 100m backstroke A |
| Gold medal – first place | 1980 Arnhem | Women's 100m breaststroke A |
| Gold medal – first place | 1980 Arnhem | Women's 100m freestyle A |
| Gold medal – first place | 1980 Arnhem | Women's 200m individual medley A |
| Gold medal – first place | 1984 Stoke Mandeville / New York | Women's 100m backstroke B1 |
| Gold medal – first place | 1984 Stoke Mandeville / New York | Women's 100m freestyle B1 |
| Gold medal – first place | 1984 Stoke Mandeville / New York | Women's 200m individual medley B1 |
| Silver medal – second place | 1984 Stoke Mandeville / New York | Women's 100m breaststroke B1 |
| Silver medal – second place | 1984 Stoke Mandeville / New York | Women's 400m freestyle B1 |

Yvette Michel (born 1965) is a Canadian retired Paralympic swimmer. She competed at the 1980 and 1984 Paralympics. Michel is blind, having lost her sight at the age of three, and first competed when she was 14 years old.
