= Judy Goodrich (Paralympian) =

Canadian retired Paralympic athlete (born 1963)

Personal information
- Born: 5 May 1963 (age 63) Calgary, Alberta, Canada

Sport
- Country: Canada
- Sport: Swimming, wheelchair basketball, and javelin
- Disability: Cerebral palsy
Medal record
Athletics
Representing Canada
Paralympics
Gold medal – first place	1992 Barcelona	Women's tournament
Bronze medal – third place	1988 Seoul	100m Freestyle C8
Silver medal – second place	1988 Seoul	100m Backstroke C8
Gold medal – first place	1984 Stoke Mandeville / New York	50m Freestyle C8
Gold medal – first place	1984 Stoke Mandeville / New York	100m Freestyle C8
Gold medal – first place	1984 Stoke Mandeville / New York	50m Backstroke C8
Gold medal – first place	1984 Stoke Mandeville / New York	Javelin C8
Silver medal – second place	1984 Stoke Mandeville / New York	100m Backstroke C8

Judy Goodrich (born 5 May 1963) is a Canadian retired Paralympic athlete. She competed in javelin, swimming, and wheelchair basketball.
