= Arlene Aikenhead =

Canadian Paralympic Equestrian and Boccia Player

Medal record
Para equestrian
Representing Canada
Paralympic Games
Silver medal – second place	1984 New York & Stoke Mandeville	Mixed Dressage - Elementary Walk C1-2
Bronze medal – third place	1984 New York & Stoke Mandeville	Mixed Obstacle Course - Walk C1-3

Arlene Aikenhead is a Canadian Paralympic equestrian and boccia player from Alberta.

She competed in the 1984 Summer Paralympics and won silver in mixed dressage, Elementary walk C1-2, and bronze in Obstacle course - Walk C1-3.
