= Al Slater (powerlifter) =

Canadian Paralympic powerlifter

Sport
- Country: Canada
- Sport: Paralympic powerlifting
Medal record
Paralympic Games
Silver medal – second place	1984 New York	82.5 kg

Al Slater is a former Canadian Paralympic powerlifter. He won the silver medal in the men's 82.5 kg event at the 1984 Summer Paralympics held in Stoke Mandeville, United Kingdom and New York City, United States. He also competed in several athletics events.
