= Lee Grenon =

Canadian Paralympic swimmer

Personal information
- Nationality: Canadian
- Born: 1963 or 1964 (age 61–62)

Sport
- Country: Canada
- Sport: Swimming
Medal record
Athletics
Representing Canada
Paralympics
Bronze medal – third place	1980 Anhem	Men's 400m individual medley B
Silver medal – second place	1984 Stoke Mandeville / New York	Men's 100m butterfly B2
Silver medal – second place	1984 Stoke Mandeville / New York	Men's 400m freestyle B2
Bronze medal – third place	1984 Stoke Mandeville / New York	Men's 400m individual medley B2
Gold medal – first place	1988 Seoul	Men's 400m freestyle B2
Gold medal – first place	1988 Seoul	Men's 100m butterfly B2
Bronze medal – third place	1988 Seoul	Men's 400m individual medley B2

Lee Grenon (born 1963 or 1964) is a Canadian retired Paralympic swimmer. He competed at the 1980, 1984, and 1988 Paralympics. He is from North Vancouver, British Columbia.
