= Russell Cecchini =

Canadian Paralympic athlete

Medal record

Representing Canada

Paralympic Games

Men's boccia
Silver medal – second place	1984 New York / Stoke Mandeville	Individual C1

Men's swimming
Bronze medal – third place	1984 New York / Stoke Mandeville	25 m Freestyle with Aids C1

Russell Cecchini is a paralympic athlete from Canada competing mainly in category C1 events.

Russell competed in the 1984 Summer Paralympics, in athletics, boccia and swimming. In Boccia, he won a silver medal in the Men's Individual C1 event. In Swimming, he won a bronze medal in the Men's 25 m Freestyle with Aids C1.
