= Gino Vendetti =

Canadian Paralympic athlete

Sport
- Country: Canada
- Sport: Para-athletics; Paralympic powerlifting
- Events: 200 metres; 400 metres; 800 metres
Medal record
Men's para-athletics
Paralympic Games
Silver medal – second place	1988 Seoul	200 m C4-5
Silver medal – second place	1988 Seoul	400 m C4-5
Bronze medal – third place	1984 New York	800 m C4
Men's powerlifting
Paralympic Games
Silver medal – second place	1984 New York	90 kg

Gino Vendetti is a former Canadian Paralympic athlete. He competed in para-athletics and in powerlifting and he won three silver medals and a bronze medal at the Summer Paralympics. He won a silver medal in powerlifting at the 1984 Summer Paralympics held in Stoke Mandeville, United Kingdom and New York City, United States. He also won the bronze medal in the men's 800 metres C4 event. At the 1988 Summer Paralympics held in Seoul, South Korea, he won the silver medal in both the men's 200 metres C4-5 and the men's 400 metres C4-5 events.

In 2015, he carried the torch as part of the torch relay of the Pan American Games held in Toronto, Canada.
