= Pier Morten =

Canadian judoka and wrestler

Personal information
- Born: 15 February 1959 (age 67)
- Home town: Burnaby, British Columbia
- Occupation: Judoka

Sport
- Country: Canada
- Sport: Para judo; Wrestling
- Disability: Deaf–blind
- Disability class: B1 and deaf
- Rank: 1st dan black belt
Medal record
Men's wrestling
Paralympic Games
Silver medal – second place	1984 Stoke Mandeville	-62 kg
Men's para judo
Paralympic Games
Bronze medal – third place	1988 Seoul	-65 kg
Bronze medal – third place	1992 Barcelona	-71 kg
Bronze medal – third place	2000 Sydney	-73 kg
World Cup of Blind Judo
Bronze medal – third place	1991	-71 kg
Bronze medal – third place	2001	-73 kg
World Blind Judo Championships
Silver medal – second place	1998	-73 kg
European Open Blind Judo Championships
Gold medal – first place	1987	-65 kg

Profile at external databases
- JudoInside.com: 89819
- Updated on 1 September 2012

Pier Morten (born 15 February 1959) is a Canadian judoka and wrestler, and is the world's first deaf-blind black belt in Judo. Morten competed in seven Paralympic Games, four in Judo and three in Wrestling, and served as Canada's flag-bearer for the closing ceremony at the 2000 Paralympics. He won bronze in Judo in the -65 kg category in 1988, 71 kg category in 1992, and -73 kg category in 2000, and silver in Wrestling in the -64 kg category in 1984.

Morten has won many awards for his achievements. He was named British Columbia's Disabled Athlete of the Year in 1987 for both Wrestling and Judo, and then again for Judo in 2000. In 1988, Morten became the first man presented with the Whang Youn Dai Achievement Award for exemplifying the spirit of the Paralympic Games. He was also awarded Sport BC's Harry Jerome Comeback Award in 1998, and won the International Blind Sports Federation's Athlete of the Year Award in 2002. Morten was inducted into the Canadian Foundation for Physically Disabled Persons Hall of Fame in 1999, and the Judo Canada Hall of Fame in 2012.

Morten is the brother of fellow Paralympian Eddie Morten, and married to former wrestler and current documentary filmmaker Shelley Morten.

== See also ==
- Judo in British Columbia
- Judo in Canada
- List of Canadian judoka
- Wrestling in Canada
