= Eddie Morten =

Canadian judoka (born 1962)

Personal information
- Born: 29 May 1962 (age 64)
- Home town: Burnaby, British Columbia
- Occupation: Judoka

Sport
- Country: Canada
- Sport: Para judo; Wrestling; Racewalking
- Disability: Deaf–blind

Achievements and titles
- Paralympic Games: 1988 Summer Paralympics: Judo; 1984 Summer Paralympics: Wrestling; 1980 Summer Paralympics: 5 km Walk
Medal record
Paralympic Games
Wrestling
| Gold medal – first place | 1984 Stoke Mandeville/New York | -65 kg |
Racewalking
| Bronze medal – third place | 1980 Arnhem | 5 km walk |
Para judo
| Bronze medal – third place | 1988 Seoul | -71 kg |

Profile at external databases
- JudoInside.com: 89952
- Updated on 2 September 2012

Eddie Morten (born 29 May 1962), also spelled 'Eddy', is a Canadian Paralympic athlete who won bronze in the 5 km Walk in 1980, gold in the -65 kg category in Wrestling in 1984, and bronze in Para judo in the -71 kg category in Para judo in 1988. Morten has been the Coordinator of the Deafblind Services Society of British Columbia's Volunteer Intervention Program since 2007, and in 2009 was awarded the Western Institute for the Deaf and Hard of Hearing's Award of Merit for his advocacy on behalf of the deaf-blind community. He is the younger brother of Pier Morten, another successful Canadian Paralympian. Morten was born deaf but with good vision, which has gradually deteriorated due to Usher Syndrome. He is now completely blind in his left eye and has severely limited vision in his right eye.

== Human Rights Tribunal ==
In August 2004, Morten asked his travel agent to book him a flight from Vancouver, British Columbia to San Francisco, California, but was told that the airline, Air Canada, would not allow him to fly without an attendant because he is deaf and partially blind. Morten filed a complaint with the Canadian Human Rights Commission in September 2005, alleging that Air Canada had discriminated against him because of his disability. In January 2009, the Tribunal ruled that Air Canada had discriminated against Morten and ordered the airline to pay him $10,000 plus interest for pain and suffering.

== See also ==
- Judo in British Columbia
- Judo in Canada
- List of Canadian judoka
- Wrestling in Canada
