= Paralympic symbols =

The Paralympic symbols are the icons, flags, and symbols used by the International Paralympic Committee (IPC) to promote the Paralympic Movement and the Paralympic Games.

== Motto ==
Since 2019, the Paralympic motto has been "Change Starts with Sport" which highlights the transformational impact of the Paralympic Movement's activities on society. Before this, the motto was "Spirit in Motion", which was introduced at the 2004 Summer Paralympics.

== Symbol ==
=== Current ===
Emblem of the Paralympic Games ("Paralympic Agitos")
- Armiger: Andrew Parsons, President of the International Paralympic Committee
- Adopted: 28 September 2004; 22 years ago
- Shield: Three agitos, coloured red, blue, and green, the three colours.

The symbol of the IPC consists of three red, blue, and green crescents encircling a single point on a white field. It was modernized from the 1992 emblem by advertising agency Scholz & Friends and was formally used for the first time during the closing ceremony of the 2004 Summer Paralympics.

In October 2019, the IPC unveiled a new version of the emblem with more consistent geometry, and brightened colours to match those used in the Olympic rings.

=== Previous ===
The first Paralympic symbol (1988–1994) used five pa.

The first IPC logo was created for the 1988 Summer Paralympics in Seoul and based on a traditional Korean decorative component called a pa, two of which make up the taegeuk symbol used in the flag of South Korea. The first Paralympic flag used five identically colored pas arranged similarly to the Olympic rings.

In 1991, the International Olympic Committee (IOC) requested that the IPC modify its logo due to its similarity to the Olympic emblem. As a result, a new Paralympic symbol utilizing only three pas was revealed at the 1992 Winter Paralympics. It took effect after the 1994 Winter Paralympics and officially remained through the 2004 Summer Paralympics.

== Paralympic emblems ==
Like the Olympics, each Paralympic Games has a unique emblem containing the name and year of the event, and reflecting the distinctive and cultural elements of the host nation. Due to the increased integration and synergy between the two events, recent Paralympics have generally shared their overall branding with their corresponding Olympics, and have accordingly used emblems with concepts that are a complement to their corresponding Olympic emblem. The 2012 Summer Paralympics were the first to share a common design with the Olympic emblem, while the 2024 Summer Paralympics were the first to use the exact same emblem with no variation between the two events.

== Flag ==
The International Paralympic Committee
- The Paralympic agitos
- Use: Sport
- Proportion: 3:5 or 1:2
- Adopted: 20 October 2019

The Paralympic flag consists of the Paralympic symbol on a white background. The current version of the flag was first flown in 2019.

== Flame and torch relay ==
As with the Olympic Games, ahead of each edition of a Paralympic Games a torch relay is held in order to build awareness and engagement in the upcoming event. During the torch relay the Paralympic flame is transferred from torchbearer to torchbearer while taking in key locations often in the host city and country. The flame is used to light the Paralympic cauldron during the Opening Ceremony of the Paralympic Games.

In October 2023, the IPC announced that beginning for the Paris 2024 Paralympic Games, the Paralympic flame would be created in Stoke Mandeville, the spiritual birthplace of the Paralympic Movement, just as the Olympic flame is ceremonially created in Olympia, Greece. Until 2024, Stoke Mandeville was used from 2014 onwards to create a "heritage flame" which then contributed to the Paralympic flame in the host country of the Games.

For Paris 2024, the Paralympic Flame was transferred from the UK through the Channel Tunnel to France before it was split into 12 parts and visited multiple French cities before coming together again as one flame for the Opening Ceremony.

A common format for the Paralympic torch relays between 2012 and 2022 was to have multiple ceremonial flames kindled in different regions of the host nation (with London using four flames kindled by scouts at the highest peaks of each country in the United Kingdom, and Tokyo using flames from each of Japan's prefectures), which are then united to form the official Paralympic flame for the remainder of the route.

== Medals ==
Paralympic medals are made of gold-plated silver, silver, or bronze and are awarded to the top 3 finishers in each event. They are designed differently for each Paralympic Games.

== Anthem ==
Anthem of the Future French: Hymne de l’Avenir German: Hymne der Zukunft
- Hymne de l’Avenir; Hymne der Zukunft
- Official anthem of the Paralympic Games and the International Paralympic Committee
- Lyrics: Graeme Connors, 2001
- Music: Thierry Darnis, March 1996
- Adopted: 1996

The Paralympic Anthem, also known as the Paralympic Hymn, is played during the raising of the Paralympic Flag. The anthem, "Hymne de l’Avenir" (en. "Anthem of the Future"), was composed by Thierry Darnis. It was approved by the IPC in March 1996, and lyrics were added by Australian country singer Graeme Connors in 2001.

== Paralympic Oath ==
The Paralympic Oath is recited at every Paralympic opening ceremony. It is a solemn promise made while holding the Paralympic Flag by one athlete, judge, and coach representing, respectively, all participating competitors, officiating referees and officials, and coaches.

=== History ===
The Paralympic Oath has been taken since the first Paralympic Games and is identical to the original Olympic Oath written by Pierre de Coubertin, with the exception of the word 'Olympic' being substituted by 'Paralympic".

== Paralympic Order ==
The Paralympic Order is the highest award given by the Paralympic Movement to individuals for particularly distinguished contributions to the Movement.

== Post nominal letters ==
Starting in 2022, the IPC introduced the post nominal letters PLY, similar to the IOC's OLY, to recognize individuals' contribution to the Paralympic movement. They was first awarded to Ragnhild Myklebust and Kevin Coombs.

== Mascots ==
Each Paralympic Games has a mascot, usually an animal native to the area or, occasionally, human figures representing the host nation's cultural heritage.

== See also ==
- Olympic symbols
