= Finland at the 1968 Summer Paralympics =

- IPC code: FIN
- NPC: Finnish Paralympic Committee
- Website: www.paralympia.fi/en

in Tel Aviv
- Competitors: 1 in 1 sport
- Medals Ranked -th: Gold 0 Silver 0 Bronze 0 Total 0

Summer Paralympics appearances (overview)
- 1960; 1964; 1968; 1972; 1976; 1980; 1984; 1988; 1992; 1996; 2000; 2004; 2008; 2012; 2016; 2020; 2024

Finland competed at the 1968 Summer Paralympics in Tel Aviv. It was the country's second participation in the Paralympics. Despite a good result in 1960 (with its sole representative winning gold in his single event), Finland did not take part in the 1964 Games. Finland again sent just one competitor: Veikko Puputti, who entered the men's javelin and club throw. He did not win any medal.

== Background ==
Finland did not take part in the 1964 Games.

== Team ==
In 1968, Finland again sent just one competitor: Veikko Puputti, who entered the men's javelin and club throw. He did not win any medal. This is the only time Finland has taken part in the Summer Paralympic Games without winning a medal.

== Opening ceremony ==
Finland the stadium during the Open Ceremonies behind Ethiopia.

== Athletics ==
Puputti entered events in disability category A. In the javelin, he achieved a throw of 13.05m, placing him 22nd out of 35 competitors in the qualifying round. This was insufficient for him to advance to the final, where South Africa's Daniel Erasmus went on to win gold with a throw of 19.79m.

Puputti's other event was the club throw. Here, a result of 25.90m ranked him 19th out of 45, causing him to be eliminated at the qualifying stage. Vic Renalson of Australia subsequently won gold, with a world record throw of 39.02m in the final round.

== See also ==
- Finland at the 1968 Summer Olympics
