= Swimming at the 1960 Summer Paralympics – Men's 25 metre crawl juniors incomplete class 4 =

Men's 25 metre crawl juniors incomplete class 4 at the I Paralympic Games
- Paralympic Swimming
- Competitors: 1 from 1 nation

Medalists
1st place, gold medalist(s)		Ersud	Norway

The Men's 25 metre crawl juniors incomplete class 4 was one of the events held in swimming at the 1960 Summer Paralympics in Rome.

It was one of several races which only a single competitor entered. Ersud (full name not recorded) of Norway swam uncontested, needing only to complete the race in order to win gold. He finished the race with a time of 21.9s.

Rank	Athlete	Time
1st place, gold medalist(s)	Ersud (NOR)	21.9s
