= Switzerland at the 1960 Summer Paralympics =

- IPC code: SUI (SVI used at these Games)
- NPC: Swiss Paralympic Committee
- Website: www.swissparalympic.ch

in Rome
- Competitors: 2
- Medals Ranked 13th: Gold 1 Silver 3 Bronze 0 Total 4

Summer Paralympics appearances (overview)
- 1960; 1964; 1968; 1972; 1976; 1980; 1984; 1988; 1992; 1996; 2000; 2004; 2008; 2012; 2016; 2020; 2024

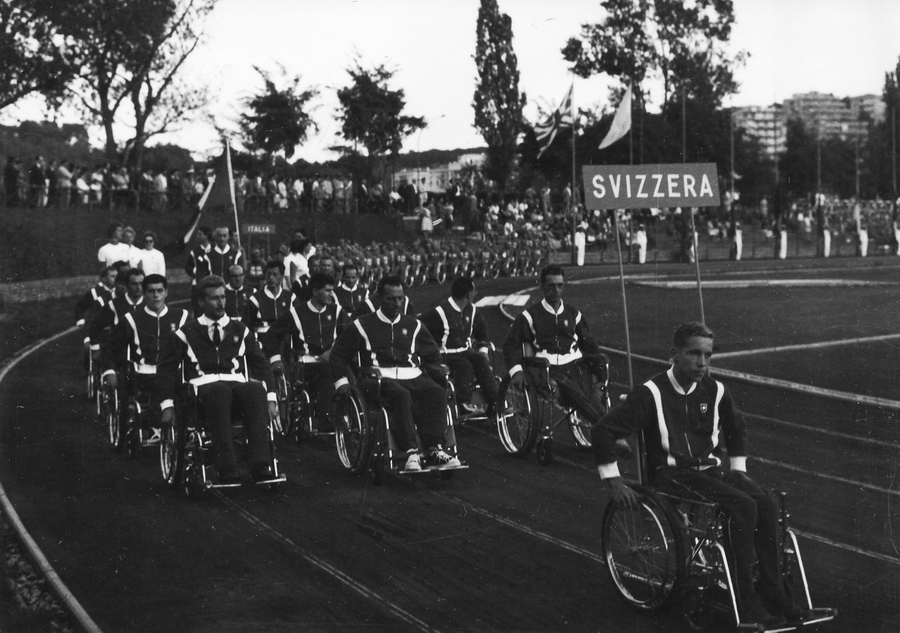
Switzerland at Rome 1960

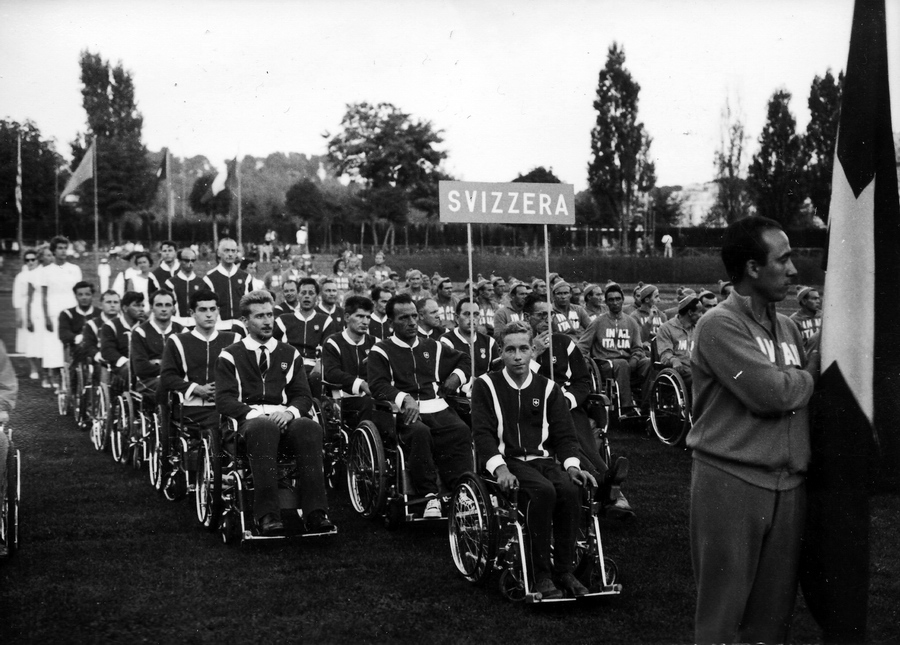
Switzerland at Rome 1960

Switzerland was one of the seventeen nations that competed at the inaugural Summer Paralympic Games in 1960 held in Rome, Italy, from September 19 to 24, 1960. Preparations for the Games began two years prior in 1958 to stage what was at the time called the 9th Annual International Stoke Mandeville Games. The team finished thirteenth in the medal table with a total of four medals, one gold and three silver. The Swiss team consisted of two athletes: Denis Favre, a man who competed in athletics and swimming events, and Simone Knusli, a woman who competed in swimming.

== Disability classifications ==
Athletes at the first Paralympics in 1960 were all afflicted by spinal cord injuries and required the use of a wheelchair. This is in contrast to later Paralympics that include events for participants that fit into any of five different disability categories; amputation, either congenital or sustained through injury or illness; cerebral palsy; wheelchair athletes; visual impairment, including blindness; Les autres, any physical disability that does not fall strictly under one of the other categories, for example dwarfism or multiple sclerosis. Each Paralympic sport then has its own classifications, dependent upon the specific physical demands of competition. Events are given a code, made of numbers and letters, describing the type of event and classification of the athletes competing.

== Medalists ==
Medal	Name	Sport	Event
Gold	Denis Favre	Swimming	Men's 50m crawl complete class 5
Silver	Denis Favre	Athletics	Men's javelin throw C
Silver	Denis Favre	Athletics	Men's shot put C
Silver	Simone Knusli	Swimming	Women's 25m breaststroke complete class 2

== Athletics ==
Denis Favre took part in two field events; the men's javelin C and the men's shot put C. In the javelin Favre threw 21.71 metres to win the silver medal; gold was won by Enzo Santini of host nation Italy, who threw 22.90 metres, and the bronze medal went to Hepple of Great Britain. Favre also won the silver medal in the shot put; his distance of 8.05 metres split the American pair of Ron Stein and Welger who took gold and bronze medals with distances of 10.13 metres and 7.77 metres respectively.

== Swimming ==
Both of the Swiss athletes took part in a swimming event at the Games. Each won a medal as their events contained only three competitors. Denis Favre won the gold medal in the men's 50 metres crawl complete class 5, beating his nearest rival Sznitowski of Argentina by 0.2 seconds. In the women's 25 metres breaststroke complete class 2 Simone Knusli won the silver medal after finishing 2.1 seconds behind the winner of the event, Great Britain's Susan Masham.

== See also ==
- Switzerland at the 1960 Summer Olympics
