= Finland at the 1960 Summer Paralympics =

- IPC code: FIN
- NPC: Finnish Paralympic Committee
- Website: www.paralympia.fi/en

in Rome
- Competitors: 1 in 1 sport
- Medals Ranked 15th: Gold 1 Silver 0 Bronze 0 Total 1

Summer Paralympics appearances (overview)
- 1960; 1964; 1968; 1972; 1976; 1980; 1984; 1988; 1992; 1996; 2000; 2004; 2008; 2012; 2016; 2020; 2024

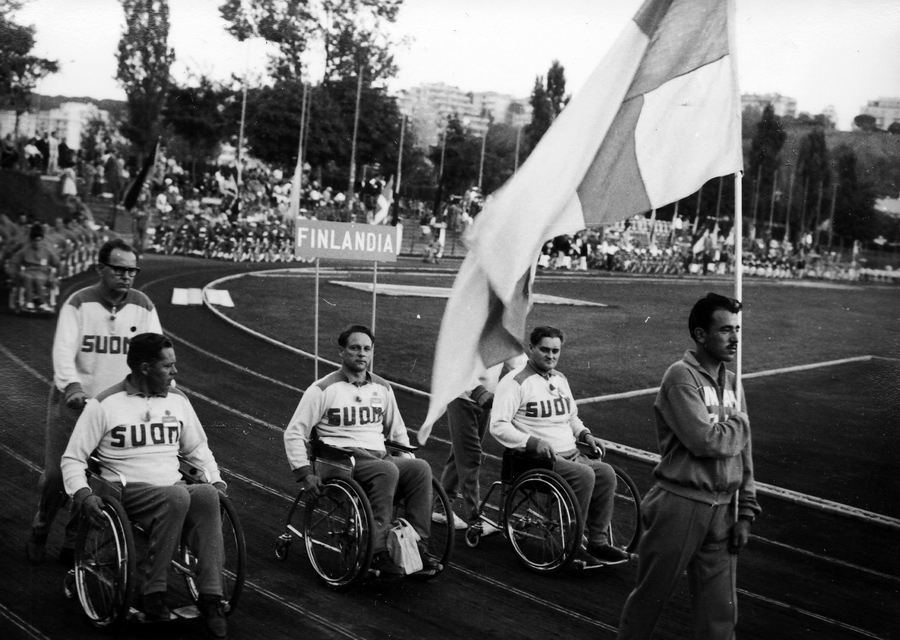
Finland at Rome 1960

Finland competed at the inaugural Summer Paralympic Games in 1960 in Rome. Like Rhodesia and Ireland, it sent only one competitor: swimmer Tauno Valkama. He entered a single event, the 50m crawl (class 4), and won gold - giving his country a perfect success rate for its first Paralympics.

== Medallists ==
Medal	Name	Sport	Event
Gold	Tauno Valkama	Swimming	Men's 50 metre crawl complete class 4

== Swimming ==
Just like all other events at the 1960 Paralympics, swimming races were held with no more than three swimmers per event, thereby guaranteeing a medal to every swimmer completing his or her race. In his sole event, Valkama competed against two Americans: R. Maduro and Hall (full names not recorded).

Valkama was a clear winner, completing the race in exactly 51 seconds, making Finland's only medal at the 1960 Games a gold. Maduro finished in 57.7s, beating his compatriot for silver; Hall swam the race in 59.8s, for bronze.

== See also ==
- Finland at the 1960 Summer Olympics
