= Argentina at the 2000 Summer Paralympics =

- IPC code: ARG
- NPC: Argentine Paralympic Committee
- Website: www.coparg.org.ar

in Sydney
- Competitors: 43 (31 on foot, 12 on wheelchairs)
- Medals Ranked 54th: Gold 0 Silver 2 Bronze 3 Total 5

Summer Paralympics appearances (overview)
- 1960; 1964; 1968; 1972; 1976; 1980; 1984; 1988; 1992; 1996; 2000; 2004; 2008; 2012; 2016; 2020; 2024

There were 12 athletes on wheelchairs and 31 athletes on foot representing the country at the 2000 Summer Paralympics.

== Medallists ==
Medal	Name	Sport	Event
Silver	Jorge Godoy	Athletics	Men's discus F11
Silver	Horàcio Bascioni	Athletics	Men's discus F52
Bronze	Elisabel Delgado	Athletics	Women's 100m T20
Bronze	Claudia Rut Vignatti	Athletics	Women's javelin F37
Bronze	Guillermo Marro	Swimming	Men's 100m backstroke S7

== See also ==
- Argentina at the 2000 Summer Olympics
- Argentina at the Paralympics

== Bibliography ==
- International Paralympic Committee (2000). "Appendix C: Athlete Numbers - By Delegation". Sydney 2000 Paralympic Games Post Games Report. Sydney.
