= Finland at the 2020 Summer Paralympics =

- IPC code: FIN
- NPC: Finnish Paralympic Committee
- Website: www.paralympia.fi/en

in Tokyo
- Competitors: 16 in 7 sports
- Flag bearers: Henry Manni; Pia-Pauliina Reitti
- Medals: Gold 1 Silver 3 Bronze 1 Total 5

Summer Paralympics appearances (overview)
- 1960; 1964; 1968; 1972; 1976; 1980; 1984; 1988; 1992; 1996; 2000; 2004; 2008; 2012; 2016; 2020; 2024

Finland competed at the 2020 Summer Paralympics in Tokyo, Japan, from 24 August to 5 September 2021. They won five medals; one gold, three silver and one bronze, all in athletics.

== Medalists ==
Medal	Name	Sport	Event	Date
Gold	Toni Piispanen	Athletics	Men's 200 metres T51	31 August
Silver	Leo-Pekka Tähti	Athletics	Men's 100 metres T54	1 September
Silver	Amanda Kotaja	Athletics	Women's 100 metres T54	1 September
Silver	Toni Piispanen	Athletics	Men's 100 metres T51	3 September
Bronze	Marjaana Heikkinen	Athletics	Women's javelin throw F34	29 August

== Competitors ==
The following is the list of number of competitors participating in the Games:

Sport	Men	Women	Total
Archery	1	0	1
Athletics	4	2	6
Cycling	2	0	2
Equestrian	0	2	2
Shooting	1	0	1
Swimming	3	0	3
Table tennis	0	1	1
Total	11	5	16

Liisa Lilja was also qualified and selected but had to withdraw due to an injury shortly before the games.

== Archery ==
Jere Forsberg qualified to compete.

Athlete	Event	Ranking round		Round of 64	Round of 32	Round of 16	Quarterfinals	Semifinals	Finals	Rank
Athlete	Event	Score	Seed	Opposition Score	Opposition Score	Opposition Score	Opposition Score	Opposition Score	Opposition Score	Rank
Jere Forsberg	Men's individual compound	682	20	Bye	Polish (USA); W 145–143	Manshaezadeh (IRI); W 145–143	Pavlík (SVK); L 141–144	did not advance		8

== Athletics ==
Six Finnish athletes (Toni Piispanen, Leo Pekka Tahti, Amanda Kotaja & Marjaana Heikkinen have qualified to compete.

Track events

Athlete	Event	Heats		Final	
Athlete	Event	Result	Rank	Result	Rank
Henry Manni	100m T34	—N/a		15.84	5
Henry Manni	800m T34	1:46.84	3 Q	1:47.34	4
Esa-Pekka Mattila	100m T54	14.71	6	did not advance	
Toni Piispanen	100m T51	—N/a		20.68	2nd place, silver medalist(s)
Toni Piispanen	200m T51	—N/a		36.81 PR	1st place, gold medalist(s)
Leo-Pekka Tähti	100m T54	13.81	1 Q	13.85	2nd place, silver medalist(s)
Leo-Pekka Tähti	400m T54	46.91	5	did not advance	

Women's track

Athlete	Event	Heats		Final	
Athlete	Event	Result	Rank	Result	Rank
Amanda Kotaja	100m T54	16.43	1 Q	15.93	2nd place, silver medalist(s)
Amanda Kotaja	400m T54	57.70	5	did not advance	

Field events

Athlete	Event	Final	
Athlete	Event	Result	Rank
Marjaana Heikkinen	Javelin throw F34	17.47	3rd place, bronze medalist(s)

== Cycling ==
Teppo Polvi and Harri Sopanen have both qualified to compete.

=== Road ===
Athlete	Event	Time	Rank
Teppo Polvi	Men's road race H1–2	1 LAP	7
Teppo Polvi	Men's road time trial H1	56:29.24	5
Harri Sopanen	Men's road race H1–2	did not start	
Harri Sopanen	Men's road time trial H1	did not finish	

== Equestrian ==
Katja Karjalainen and Pia-Pauliina Reitti have both qualified to compete.

Athlete	Horse	Event	Final	
Athlete	Horse	Event	Result	Rank
Katja Karjalainen	Dr Doolittle	Individual Championship test grade I	71.893	6
Katja Karjalainen	Dr Doolittle	Individual Freestyle test grade I	74.640	6
Pia-Pauliina Reitti	Supremo Road	Individual Championship test grade IV	66.269	12

== Paratriathlon ==
Liisa Lilja was qualified and scheduled to compete but had to withdraw after being injured in a car accident shortly before the games.

== Shooting ==
Finland entered one athletes into the Paralympic competition. Jarkko Mylly successfully break the Paralympic qualification at the 2018 WSPS World Cup which was held in Châteauroux, France.

Athlete	Event	Qualification		Final	
Athlete	Event	Score	Rank	Score	Rank
Jarkko Mylly	Mixed 10 m air rifle prone SH1	625.3	41	did not advance	
Jarkko Mylly	Mixed 50 m air rifle prone SH1	615.2	15	did not advance	

== Swimming ==
Three swimmers, all male, have qualified to compete.

Men

Athlete	Event	Heats		Final	
Athlete	Event	Result	Rank	Result	Rank
Nader Khalili	100m backstroke S14	1:07.04	17	did not advance	
Leo Lähteenmäki	50m freestyle S9	26.64	14	did not advance	
Antti Latikka	100m backstroke S13	1:03.75	8 Q	1:04.21	7

== Table tennis ==
Aino Tapola qualified to compete. She is Finland's first female para table tennis player to compete at the Paralympics.

Women

Athlete	Event	Group Stage			Round of 16	Quarterfinals	Semifinals	Final	
Athlete	Event	Opposition Result	Opposition Result	Rank	Opposition Result	Opposition Result	Opposition Result	Opposition Result	Rank
Aino Tapola	Individual C1–2	Oliveira (BRA); L 1–3	Bucław (POL); L 0–3	3	did not advance				

== See also ==
- Finland at the Paralympics
- Finland at the 2020 Summer Olympics
