= Finland at the 1996 Summer Paralympics =

- IPC code: FIN
- NPC: Finnish Paralympic Committee
- Website: www.paralympia.fi/en

in Atlanta
- Competitors: 65 (53 men and 12 women)
- Medals Ranked 30th: Gold 4 Silver 5 Bronze 4 Total 13

Summer Paralympics appearances (overview)
- 1960; 1964; 1968; 1972; 1976; 1980; 1984; 1988; 1992; 1996; 2000; 2004; 2008; 2012; 2016; 2020; 2024

65 athletes (53 men and 12 women) from Finland competed at the 1996 Summer Paralympics in Atlanta, United States.

== Medallists ==
Medal	Name	Sport	Event
Gold	Martti Rantavouri	Archery	Men's individual W1
Gold	Mikael Saleva	Athletics	Men's javelin F54
Gold	Juha Oikarainen; Arttu Makinen; Jani Kallunki; Jorma Kivinen; Asko Kinnunen; Marko Kauppila	Goalball	Men's team
Gold	Matti Launonen; Jari Kurkinen	Table tennis	Men's team 1-2
Silver	Rauno Saunavaara	Athletics	Men's javelin F53
Silver	Maria-Terttu Piiroinen; Iris Keitel; Mari Pekkala; Tarja Pelkonen; Merja Hanski	Goalball	Women's team
Silver	Eeva Riitta Fingerroos	Swimming	Women's 100m backstroke B1
Silver	Eeva Riitta Fingerroos	Swimming	Women's 100m butterfly B1
Silver	Matti Launonen	Table tennis	Men's singles 1
Bronze	Eeva Riitta Fingerroos	Swimming	Women's 100m freestyle B1
Bronze	Eeva Riitta Fingerroos	Swimming	Women's 200m medley B1
Bronze	Jari Kurkinen	Table tennis	Men's singles 2
Bronze	Veli-Matti Tuominen; Matti Pulli; Lauri Venalainen; Esa Liukkonen; Jari Heino; Lauri Melanen; Sami Tervo; Pekka Norola; Keijo Hanninen; Reijo Salonen; Jukka Laine; Petri Kapiainen	Volleyball	Men's sitting volleyball

== See also ==
- Finland at the Paralympics
- Finland at the 1996 Summer Olympics
