= Argentina at the 1972 Summer Paralympics =

- IPC code: ARG
- NPC: Argentine Paralympic Committee
- Website: www.coparg.org.ar

in Heidelberg
- Competitors: 21
- Medals Ranked 20th: Gold 2 Silver 4 Bronze 3 Total 9

Summer Paralympics appearances (overview)
- 1960; 1964; 1968; 1972; 1976; 1980; 1984; 1988; 1992; 1996; 2000; 2004; 2008; 2012; 2016; 2020; 2024

Argentina sent a team to compete at the 1972 Summer Paralympics in Heidelberg, West Germany. They sent twenty one competitors, twelve male and nine female. The team finished twentieth in the medal table and won nine medals, two gold, four silver and three bronze.

== Team ==
Athletes at the Paralympics in 1972 were all afflicted by spinal cord injuries and required the use of a wheelchair., although people who were hard of sight could compete in the demonstration event. This is in contrast to later Paralympics that include events for participants that fit into any of five different disability categories; amputation, either congenital or sustained through injury or illness; cerebral palsy; wheelchair athletes; visual impairment, including blindness; Les autres, any physical disability that does not fall strictly under one of the other categories, for example dwarfism or multiple sclerosis. Each Paralympic sport then has its own classifications, dependent upon the specific physical demands of competition. Events are given a code, made of numbers and letters, describing the type of event and classification of the athletes competing.

== Team ==
Noemi Tortul was back again for her third consecutive Games. Noemi Tortul won her first gold medal at these Games.

== Athletics ==
Argentina entered nineteen of its twenty one competitors, ten male and nine female. They won six medals, one gold, four silver and one bronze in this event. Benedetti, Cristina, Ferrari, Richetti and di Paolo won medals in this event.

== Swimming ==
Argentina entered seven of its twenty one competitors, two male and five female. They won one medal, a bronze in this event. Richetti won the medal in this event.

== Table tennis ==
Argentina entered two of its twenty one competitors, both male. They won no medals in this event.

== Wheelchair basketball ==
Noemi Tortul won her first gold medal at these Games after two previous Paralympic Games appearances. Her gold came in women's wheelchair basketball.
