= Argentina at the 1976 Summer Paralympics =

- IPC code: ARG
- NPC: Argentine Paralympic Committee
- Website: www.coparg.org.ar

in Toronto
- Competitors: 20
- Medals Ranked 23rd: Gold 3 Silver 4 Bronze 7 Total 14

Summer Paralympics appearances (overview)
- 1960; 1964; 1968; 1972; 1976; 1980; 1984; 1988; 1992; 1996; 2000; 2004; 2008; 2012; 2016; 2020; 2024

Argentina sent a delegation to compete at the 1976 Summer Paralympics in Toronto, Ontario, Canada. Its athletes finished twenty third in the overall medal count.

== See also ==
- 1976 Summer Paralympics
- Argentina at the 1976 Summer Olympics
