= Argentina at the 1992 Summer Paralympics =

- IPC code: ARG
- NPC: Argentine Paralympic Committee
- Website: www.coparg.org.ar

in Barcelona
- Competitors: 27
- Medals Ranked 44th: Gold 1 Silver 1 Bronze 0 Total 2

Summer Paralympics appearances (overview)
- 1960; 1964; 1968; 1972; 1976; 1980; 1984; 1988; 1992; 1996; 2000; 2004; 2008; 2012; 2016; 2020; 2024

Argentina competed at the 1992 Summer Paralympics in Barcelona, Spain. 27 competitors from Argentina won 2 medals, 1 gold and 1 silver, to finish 40th in the medal table.

== See also ==
- Argentina at the Paralympics
- Argentina at the 1992 Summer Olympics
