= Finland at the 2024 Summer Paralympics =

- IPC code: FIN
- NPC: Finnish Paralympic Committee
- Website: www.paralympia.fi/en

in Paris, France August 28, 2024 – September 8, 2024
- Competitors: 16 in 6 sports
- Flag bearers: Laura Kangasniemi; Leo-Pekka Tähti
- Medals Ranked 71st: Gold 0 Silver 1 Bronze 3 Total 4

Summer Paralympics appearances (overview)
- 1960; 1964; 1968; 1972; 1976; 1980; 1984; 1988; 1992; 1996; 2000; 2004; 2008; 2012; 2016; 2020; 2024

Finland competed at the 2024 Summer Paralympics in Paris, France, from 28 August to 8 September.

== Competitors ==
The following is the list of number of competitors in the Games.

Sport	Men	Women	Total
Archery	2	0	2
Athletics	4	4	8
Cycling	1	0	1
Equestrian	0	3	3
Shooting	1	0	1
Table tennis	0	1	1
Total	8	8	16

== Archery ==
Finland entered two male athletes into the games by virtue of his result at the 2023 European Para Championships in Rotterdam, Netherlands; and through 2024 World Qualification Tournament in Dubai, United Arab Emirates.

Legends: L= Lost W= Won

Athlete	Event	Ranking Round		Round of 32	Round of 16	Quarterfinals	Semifinals	Finals	
Athlete	Event	Score	Seed	Opposition Score	Opposition Score	Opposition Score	Opposition Score	Opposition Score	Rank
Jean-Pierre Antonios	Men's individual W1	633	10	—N/a	Tonon (ITA); L 132-130	Did not advance			
Jere Forsberg	Men's individual compound	697	3	Ka (HKG); W142-137	Stutzman (USA); L 141-141*	Did not advance			

== Athletics ==
Finnish track and field athletes achieved quota places for the following events based on their results at the 2023 World Championships, 2024 World Championships, or through high performance allocation, as long as they meet the minimum entry standard (MES).

Key

- Note–Ranks given for track events are within the athlete's heat only
- Q = Qualified for the next round
- q = Qualified for the next round as a fastest loser or, in field events, by position without achieving the qualifying target
- DQ = Disqualified
- PR = Paralympic Record
- AR = Area (or continental) Record
- NR = National Record
- SB = Season's Best
- N/A = Round not applicable for the event
- Bye = Athlete not required to compete in round

Track & road events

Athlete	Event	Heat		Final	
Athlete	Event	Result	Rank	Result	Rank
Henry Manni	Men's 100 m T34	15.74	3 Q	15.64	7
Henry Manni	Men's 800 m T34	1:46.27	5	Did not advance	
Toni Piispanen	Men's 100 m T51	—N/a		21.14	3rd place, bronze medalist(s)
Toni Piispanen	Men's 200 m T51	—N/a		38.55	2nd place, silver medalist(s)
Leo-Pekka Tähti	Men's 100 m T54	13.84	2 Q	13.86	3rd place, bronze medalist(s)
Iida Lounela	Women's 100 m T12	28.33	3	Did not advance	
Amanda Kotaja	Women's 100 m T54	16.00	2 Q	15.77	3rd place, bronze medalist(s)
Vilma Berg	Women's 400 m T38	DNS	—	Did not advance	

Field events

Athlete	Event	Final	
Athlete	Event	Distance	Position
Teijo Kööpikkä	Men's shot put F57	14.18	4
Iida Lounela	Women's long jump T12	5.19	4
Vilma Berg	Women's long jump T38	4.25	10
Marjaana Heikkinen	Women's javelin throw F34	16.58	6

== Cycling ==
Finland sent one male para-cyclist after finished the top eligible nation's at the 2022 UCI Nation's ranking allocation ranking.

Athlete	Event	Time	Rank
Teppo Polvi	Men's time trial H1	Withdrawn	
Teppo Polvi	Men's road race H1–2	Withdrawn	

== Equestrian ==
Finland entered two para-equestrians into the Paralympic equestrian competition, by virtue of the nations individual final world para dressage rankings.

Individual

Athlete	Horse	Event	Total	
Athlete	Horse	Event	Score	Rank
Laura Kangasniemi	Goldprins	Individual championship test grade IV	66.111	15
Laura Kangasniemi	Goldprins	Individual freestyle test grade IV	Withdrew	
Katja Karjalainen	Kameo	Individual championship test grade I	57.917	22
Katja Karjalainen	Kameo	Individual freestyle test grade I	Withdrew	
Jonna Aaltonen	Laxton For U	Individual championship test grade V	67.974	11
Jonna Aaltonen	Laxton For U	Individual freestyle test grade V	withdrew	

Team

Athlete	Horse	Event	Individual score	Total	
Athlete	Horse	Event	TT	Score	Rank
Laura Kangasniemi	See above	Team	withdrew	0	=
Katja Karjalainen	See above	Team	withdrew	0	=
Jonna Aaltonen	See above	Team	withdrew	0	=

== Shooting ==
Finland entered one athlete for the Paralympic games, qualified through the 2024 WSPS European Championships.

Athlete	Event	Qualification		Final	
Athlete	Event	Points	Rank	Points	Rank
Jarkko Mylly	Mixed 10 m air rifle prone SH1				
Jarkko Mylly	Mixed 50m rifle prone SH1				

== Table tennis ==
Finland entered one athlete for the Paralympic games. Aino Tapola qualified for the games through the allocations of the final ITTF world ranking.

Athlete	Event	Group Stage				Quarterfinals	Semifinals	Final / BM	
Athlete	Event	Opposition Result	Opposition Result	Opposition Result	Rank	Opposition Result	Opposition Result	Opposition Result	Rank
Aino Tapola	Women's individual C1–2								

== See also ==
- Finland at the 2024 Summer Olympics
- Finland at the Paralympics
