= 1960 Summer Paralympics medal table =

1960 Summer Paralympics medals
- Location: Rome Italy

Highlights
- Most gold medals: Italy (29)
- Most total medals: Italy (80)
- Medalling NPCs: 17

The 1960 Summer Paralympics medal table is a list of National Paralympic Committees (NPCs) ranked by the number of gold medals won by their athletes during the 1960 Summer Paralympics (the inaugural Paralympic Games), held in Rome, Italy, from September 18 to 25, 1960.

Due to there being no more than three competitors per event, every participant was guaranteed a medal upon successful completion of their event.

== Medal table ==
The ranking in this table is based on information provided by the International Paralympic Committee (IPC) and is consistent with IPC convention in its published medal tables. By default, the table is ordered by the number of gold medals the athletes from a nation have won (in this context, a "nation" is an entity represented by a National Paralympic Committee). The number of silver medals is taken into consideration next and then the number of bronze medals. If nations are still tied, equal ranking is given and they are listed alphabetically by IPC country code.

To sort this table by nation, total medal count, or any other column, click on the icon next to the column title.

* Host nation (Italy)

Rank	Nation	Gold	Silver	Bronze	Total
1	Italy*	29	28	23	80
2	Great Britain	20	15	20	55
3	West Germany	15	6	9	30
4	Austria	11	8	11	30
5	United States	11	7	7	25
6	Norway	9	3	4	16
7	Australia	3	6	1	10
8	Netherlands	3	6	0	9
9	France	3	3	1	7
10	Argentina	2	3	1	6
11	Rhodesia	2	1	2	5
12	Ireland	2	0	0	2
13	Switzerland	1	3	0	4
14	Belgium	1	1	1	3
15	Finland	1	0	0	1
16	Israel	0	2	2	4
16	Malta	0	2	2	4
Totals (17 entries)		113	94	84	291

== See also ==
- 1960 Summer Olympics medal table
