= Argentina at the 1984 Summer Paralympics =

- IPC code: ARG
- NPC: Argentine Paralympic Committee
- Website: www.coparg.org.ar

in Stoke Mandeville/New York
- Competitors: 6
- Medals: Gold 0 Silver 0 Bronze 0 Total 0

Summer Paralympics appearances (overview)
- 1960; 1964; 1968; 1972; 1976; 1980; 1984; 1988; 1992; 1996; 2000; 2004; 2008; 2012; 2016; 2020; 2024

Argentina competed at the 1984 Summer Paralympics in Stoke Mandeville, Great Britain and New York City, United States. 6 competitors from Argentina won no medals and so did not place in the medal table.

== See also ==
- Argentina at the Paralympics
- Argentina at the 1984 Summer Olympics
