= Finland at the 1988 Summer Paralympics =

- IPC code: FIN
- NPC: Finnish Paralympic Committee
- Website: www.paralympia.fi/en

in Seoul
- Competitors: 62
- Medals Ranked 22nd: Gold 11 Silver 23 Bronze 16 Total 50

Summer Paralympics appearances (overview)
- 1960; 1964; 1968; 1972; 1976; 1980; 1984; 1988; 1992; 1996; 2000; 2004; 2008; 2012; 2016; 2020; 2024

Finland competed at the 1988 Summer Paralympics in Seoul, South Korea. 62 competitors from Finland won 50 medals including 11 gold, 23 silver and 16 bronze and finished 22nd in the medal table.

== See also ==
- Finland at the Paralympics
- Finland at the 1988 Summer Olympics
