= Finland at the 2012 Summer Paralympics =

- IPC code: FIN
- NPC: Finnish Paralympic Committee
- Website: www.paralympia.fi/en

in London
- Flag bearer: Leo-Pekka Tähti
- Medals Ranked 27th: Gold 4 Silver 1 Bronze 1 Total 6

Summer Paralympics appearances (overview)
- 1960; 1964; 1968; 1972; 1976; 1980; 1984; 1988; 1992; 1996; 2000; 2004; 2008; 2012; 2016; 2020; 2024

Finland competed at the 2012 Summer Paralympics in London, United Kingdom, from 29 August to 9 September 2012.

== Archery ==
Men

Athlete	Event	Ranking round		Round of 32	Round of 16	Quarterfinals	Semifinals	Finals	
Athlete	Event	Score	Seed	Opposition score	Opposition score	Opposition score	Opposition score	Opposition score	Rank
Jean-Pierre Antonios	Ind. compound W1	632	4	—N/a	Bye	Kinnunen (FIN) (5); L 4-6	Did not advance		
Osmo Kinnunen	Ind. compound W1	627	5	—N/a	Bartos (CZE) (12); W 6-0	Antonios (FIN) (4); W 6-4	Drahoninsky (CZE) (1); L 0-6	Murphy (CAN) (6); L 1-7	4
Jere Forsberg	Ind. compound Open	673	2	Bye	Aygan (TUR) (18); W 6-4	Bartos (CZE) (7); W 6-0	Hanci (TUR) (3); W 7-3	Stutzman (USA) (1); W 6-4	1st place, gold medalist(s)
Keijo Kallunki	Ind. compound Open	650	12	Cancelli (ITA) (21); L 0-6	Did not advance				

Women

Athlete	Event	Ranking round		Round of 32	Round of 16	Quarterfinals	Semifinals	Finals	
Athlete	Event	Score	Seed	Opposition score	Opposition score	Opposition score	Opposition score	Opposition score	Rank
Saana-Maria Sinisalo	Ind. recurve W1/W2	523	10	Bye	Kalay (TUR) (7); L 2-6	Did not advance			

== Athletics ==
Athlete	Event	Heat		Final	
Athlete	Event	Result	Rank	Result	Rank
Aleksi Kirjonen	Men's shot put F56	—N/a		11.89	11
Aleksi Kirjonen	Men's javelin throw F56	—N/a		26.36	12
Esa-Pekka Mattila	Men's 100 m T54	14.99	6	Did not advance	
Timo Mustikkamaa	Men's discus throw F37	—N/a		39.98	12
Toni Piispanen	Men's 100 m T51	—N/a		21.72 PR	1st place, gold medalist(s)
Leo Pekka Tähti	Men's 100 m T54	13.63 WR	1 Q	13.79	1st place, gold medalist(s)
Leo Pekka Tähti	Men's 400 m T54	48.30	4 q	47.68 PB	4
Marjaana Huovinen	Women's shot put F34	—N/a		7.64 PB	4
Marjaana Huovinen	Women's javelin throw F34	—N/a		19.47 PB	3rd place, bronze medalist(s)
Amanda Kotaja	Women's 100 m T54	16.45 PB	2 Q	16.29 ER	4
Amanda Kotaja	Women's 400 m T54	58.06 PB	3 Q	57.35 PB	6
Amanda Kotaja	Women's 800 m T54	2:00.73	6	Did not advance	

== Cycling ==
- Jarmo Ollanketo
- Marko Törmänen

== Equestrian ==
- Katja Karjalainen
- Jaana Kivimäki

== Goalball ==
=== Men's tournament ===
- Toni Alenius
- Jarno Mattila
- Erkki Miinala
- Ville Montonen
- Tuomas Nousu
- Petri Posio

Group play

Team	Pld	W	D	L	GF	GA	GD	Pts	Qualification
Turkey	5	4	1	0	26	6	+20	13	Quarterfinals
Brazil	5	3	0	2	30	20	+10	9	Quarterfinals
Lithuania	5	2	2	1	33	20	+13	8	Quarterfinals
Finland	5	2	0	3	16	24	−8	6	Quarterfinals
Sweden	5	1	2	2	16	25	−9	5	Eliminated
Great Britain	5	0	1	4	9	35	−26	1	Eliminated

Source: "London 2012 Paralympic Games - Goalball results" (PDF). Paralympic.org. 2012-10-03 – via Goalball.sport.

30 August 2012; 10:15	Finland	5 – 6	Brazil	Copper Box, London; Referees: Launel Scott (CAN), Thomas Baerz (GER)
30 August 2012; 10:15	Alenius 3 Mattila 1 Minala 1	Report	Marques 4 Silvestre 2	Copper Box, London; Referees: Launel Scott (CAN), Thomas Baerz (GER)

31 August 2012; 10:15	Lithuania	10 – 0	Finland	Copper Box, London; Referees: Dawna Christy (CAN), Warrick Jackes (AUS)
31 August 2012; 10:15	Pavliukianec 5 Juchna 3 Leonavicius 1 Zibolis 1	Report		Copper Box, London; Referees: Dawna Christy (CAN), Warrick Jackes (AUS)

1 September 2012; 09:00	Turkey	4 – 0	Finland	Copper Box, London; Referees: Shinji Mizuno (JPN), Carla Da Matta (BRA)
1 September 2012; 09:00	Karakaya 3 Düzgün 1	Report		Copper Box, London; Referees: Shinji Mizuno (JPN), Carla Da Matta (BRA)

2 September 2012; 18:30	Great Britain	3 – 7	Finland	Copper Box, London; Referees: Warrick Jackes (AUS), Yasser Omar (EGY)
2 September 2012; 18:30	Knott 3	Report	Mattila 4 Montonen 1 Miinala 1 Posio 1	Copper Box, London; Referees: Warrick Jackes (AUS), Yasser Omar (EGY)

4 September 2012; 17:15	Finland	4 – 1	Sweden	Copper Box, London; Referees: Hooshang Shariati (IRI), Dawna Christy (CAN)
4 September 2012; 17:15	Mattila 4	Report	Seremeti 1	Copper Box, London; Referees: Hooshang Shariati (IRI), Dawna Christy (CAN)

Quarter-final

5 September 2012; 21:00	Iran	1 – 5	Finland	Copper Box, London; Referees: Morten Hammershoi (DEN), Kimberly Anderson (USA)
5 September 2012; 21:00	Sayahi 1	Report	Posio 3 Mattila 2	Copper Box, London; Referees: Morten Hammershoi (DEN), Kimberly Anderson (USA)

Semi-final

6 September 2012; 18:30	Turkey	0 – 2	Finland	Copper Box, London; Referees: Tony Connolly (USA), Yasser Omar (EGY)
6 September 2012; 18:30		Report	Mattila 2	Copper Box, London; Referees: Tony Connolly (USA), Yasser Omar (EGY)

Final

7 September 2012; 20:00	Brazil	1 – 8	Finland	Copper Box, London; Referees: Bülent Kimyon (TUR), Tony Connolly (USA)
7 September 2012; 20:00	Leo. Moreno da Silva 1	Report	Posio 4 Mattila 3 Miinala 1	Copper Box, London; Referees: Bülent Kimyon (TUR), Tony Connolly (USA)

=== Women's tournament ===
- Katja Heikkinen
- Kaisu Hynninen
- Iida Kauppila
- Krista Leppänen
- Maija Somerkivi
- Sanna Tynkkynen

Group play

Team	Pld	W	D	L	GF	GA	GD	Pts	Qualification
China	4	4	0	0	28	4	+24	12	Quarterfinals
Great Britain	4	2	1	1	10	9	+1	7	Quarterfinals
Brazil	4	2	0	2	8	15	−7	6	Quarterfinals
Finland	4	1	1	2	10	13	−3	4	Quarterfinals
Denmark	4	0	0	4	3	18	−15	0	Eliminated

Source: "London 2012 Paralympic Games - Goalball results" (PDF). Paralympic.org. 2012-10-03 – via Goalball.sport.

31 August 2012; 15:00	Finland	1 – 1	Great Britain	Copper Box, London; Referees: Morten Hammershoi (DEN), Ali Aldarsony (KSA)
31 August 2012; 15:00	Leppänen 1	Report	Luke 1	Copper Box, London; Referees: Morten Hammershoi (DEN), Ali Aldarsony (KSA)

1 September 2012; 21:00	Denmark	2 – 3	Finland	Copper Box, London; Referees: Christl Daentler (GER), Tony Connolly (USA)
1 September 2012; 21:00	Jørgensen 2	Report	Leppänen 2 Heikkinen 1	Copper Box, London; Referees: Christl Daentler (GER), Tony Connolly (USA)

3 September 2012; 15:00	Brazil	5 – 4	Finland	Copper Box, London

4 September 2012; 10:15	Finland	2 – 5	China	Copper Box, London; Referees: Bulent Kimyon (TUR), Launel Scott (CAN)
4 September 2012; 10:15	Hynninen 1 Somerkivi 1	Report	Wang R. 4 Chen 1	Copper Box, London; Referees: Bulent Kimyon (TUR), Launel Scott (CAN)

Quarter-final

5 September 2012; 14:15	Canada	1 – 2	Finland	Copper Box, London

Semi-final

6 September 2012; 13:30	China	4 – 1	Finland	Copper Box, London; Referees: Dawna Christy (CAN), Carla Da Matta (BRA)
6 September 2012; 13:30	Chen 2 Lin 1 Wang S. 1	Report	Leppänen 1	Copper Box, London; Referees: Dawna Christy (CAN), Carla Da Matta (BRA)

Bronze medal game

7 September 2012; 13:30	Finland	1 – 5	Sweden	Copper Box, London; Referees: Carla Da Matta (BRA), Kimberly Anderson (USA)
7 September 2012; 13:30	Heikkinen 1	Report	Naesström 2 Gustavsson 2 Jälmestål 1	Copper Box, London; Referees: Carla Da Matta (BRA), Kimberly Anderson (USA)

== Judo ==
- Jani Kallunki
- Päivi Tolppanen

== Sailing ==
- Niko Salomaa

== Shooting ==
- Minna Sinikka Leinonen
- Veli Veikko Palsamäki

== Swimming ==
Men

Athlete	Class	Event	Heats		Final	
Athlete	Class	Event	Result	Rank	Result	Rank
Antti Antero Latikka	S13	100 m backstroke	1:04.33	6 Q	1:05.89	8

Women

Athlete	Class	Event	Heats		Final	
Athlete	Class	Event	Result	Rank	Result	Rank
Meri-Maari Mäkinen	S7	50 m freestyle	40.58	16	Did not advance	
Meri-Maari Mäkinen	S7	100 m backstroke	1:42.69	16	Did not advance	
Meri-Maari Mäkinen	SB7	100 m breaststroke	2:02.32	10	Did not advance	

== Table tennis ==
Athlete	Event	Group			Quarterfinals	Semifinals	Final	
Athlete	Event	Opposition Result	Opposition Result	Rank	Opposition Result	Opposition Result	Opposition Result	Rank
Esa Miettinen	Men's individual C9	Adisa (NGR); W 3–1	Bellais (FRA); L 2–3	2	Did not advance			
