= Finland at the 1984 Summer Paralympics =

- IPC code: FIN
- NPC: Finnish Paralympic Committee
- Website: www.paralympia.fi/en

in Stoke Mandeville/New York
- Competitors: 57
- Medals Ranked 15th: Gold 18 Silver 14 Bronze 27 Total 59

Summer Paralympics appearances (overview)
- 1960; 1964; 1968; 1972; 1976; 1980; 1984; 1988; 1992; 1996; 2000; 2004; 2008; 2012; 2016; 2020; 2024

Finland competed at the 1984 Summer Paralympics in Stoke Mandeville, Great Britain and New York City, United States. 57 competitors from Finland won 59 medals including 18 gold, 14 silver and 27 bronze and finished 15th in the medal table.

== See also ==
- Finland at the Paralympics
- Finland at the 1984 Summer Olympics
