= Finland at the 2004 Summer Paralympics =

- IPC code: FIN
- NPC: Finnish Paralympic Committee
- Website: www.paralympia.fi/en

in Athens
- Competitors: 54 in 10 sports
- Medals Ranked 33rd: Gold 4 Silver 1 Bronze 3 Total 8

Summer Paralympics appearances (overview)
- 1960; 1964; 1968; 1972; 1976; 1980; 1984; 1988; 1992; 1996; 2000; 2004; 2008; 2012; 2016; 2020; 2024

Finland competed at the 2004 Summer Paralympics in Athens, Greece. The team included 54 athletes, 31 men and 23 women. Competitors from Finland won 8 medals, including 4 gold, 1 silver and 3 bronze to finish 33rd in the medal table.

== Medallists ==
Medal	Name	Sport	Event
Gold	Leo Pekka Tähti	Athletics	Men's 100m T54
Gold	Leo Pekka Tähti	Athletics	Men's 200m T54
Gold	Marjaana Vare	Athletics	Women's javelin throw F42-46
Gold	Minna Leinonen	Shooting	Mixed air rifle prone SH2
Silver	Rauno Saunavaara	Athletics	Men's javelin throw F54
Bronze	Markku Niinimaki	Athletics	Men's shot put F54
Bronze	Tiina Ala Aho	Athletics	Women's javelin throw F33/34/52/53
Bronze	Jani Kallunki	Judo	Men's 66kg

== Sports ==
=== Archery ===
Athlete	Event	Ranking round		Round of 32	Round of 16	Quarterfinals	Semifinals	Finals	
Athlete	Event	Score	Seed	Opposition score	Opposition score	Opposition score	Opposition score	Opposition score	Rank
Jean Pierre Antonios	Men's individual W1	603	9	N/A	Lehner (SUI); W 160-155	Fabry (USA); L 102-109	did not advance		

=== Athletics ===
==== Men's track ====
Athlete	Class	Event	Heats		Semifinal		Final	
Athlete	Class	Event	Result	Rank	Result	Rank	Result	Rank
Leo Pekka Tähti	T54	100m	14.03	1 Q	14.30	1 Q	14.19	1st place, gold medalist(s)
Leo Pekka Tähti	T54	200m	25.22	1 Q	N/A		25.25	1st place, gold medalist(s)

==== Men's field ====
Athlete	Class	Event	Final		
Athlete	Class	Event	Result	Points	Rank
Markku Niinimaki	F54	Javelin	24.76	-	4
Markku Niinimaki	F54	Shot put	8.88	-	3rd place, bronze medalist(s)
Rauno Saunavaara	F54	Javelin	26.79	-	2nd place, silver medalist(s)

==== Women's field ====
Athlete	Class	Event	Final		
Athlete	Class	Event	Result	Points	Rank
Tiina Ala Aho	F32-34/52/53	Shot put	4.88	899	9
Tiina Ala Aho	F33/34/52/53	Javelin	13.32	1258	3rd place, bronze medalist(s)
Marjaana Vare	F42-46	Javelin	28.79	1037 WR	1st place, gold medalist(s)
Marjaana Vare	F42-46	Shot put	6.24	833	12

=== Cycling ===
==== Women's road ====
Athlete	Event	Time	Rank
Merja Hanski; Virve Taljavirta	Women's road race/time trial tandem B1-3	-	7

==== Women's track ====
Athlete	Event	Qualification		Final	
Athlete	Event	Time	Rank	Opposition Time	Rank
Merja Hanski; Virve Taljavirta	Women's 1km time trial tandem B1-3	N/A		1:17.75	8
Merja Hanski; Virve Taljavirta	Women's individual pursuit tandem B1-3	4:01.46	11	did not advance	

=== Goalball ===
The men's goalball team didn't win any medals; they were 5th out of 8 teams.

==== Players ====
- Veli Matti Aittola
- Arttu Makinen
- Jarno Mattila
- Sami Mustonen
- Juha Oikarainen
- Petri Posio

==== Men's tournament ====
Game	Match	Score	Rank
1	Finland vs. Spain (ESP)	3 - 3	3 Q
2	Finland vs. South Korea (KOR)	10 - 0	3 Q
3	Finland vs. Hungary (HUN)	2 - 1	3 Q
4	Finland vs. Lithuania (LTU)	4 - 8	3 Q
5	Finland vs. Slovenia (SLO)	1 - 8	3 Q
Quarterfinals	Finland vs. Sweden (SWE)	1 - 5	L
Semifinals	Finland vs. South Korea (KOR)	5 - 3	W
5th/6th classification	Finland vs. Spain (ESP)	4 - 3	5

The women's goalball team didn't win any medals; they lost to Japan in the bronze medal match.

==== Players ====
- Sanna Arkko
- Katja Heikkinen
- Kaisa Penttila
- Maria-Terttu Piiroinen
- Paivi Tolppanen
- Sanna Tynkkynen

==== Women's tournament ====
Game	Match	Score	Rank
1	Finland vs. Canada (CAN)	1 - 3	4 Q
2	Finland vs. United States (USA)	1 - 3	4 Q
3	Finland vs. Japan (JPN)	1 - 2	4 Q
4	Finland vs. Netherlands (NED)	8 - 1	4 Q
5	Finland vs. Germany (GER)	5 - 1	4 Q
6	Finland vs. Brazil (BRA)	10 - 0	4 Q
7	Finland vs. Greece (GRE)	4 - 0	4 Q
Semifinals	Finland vs. Canada (CAN)	0 - 0	L
Bronze medal final	Finland vs. Japan (JPN)	1 - 2	4

=== Judo ===
==== Men ====
Athlete	Event	Preliminary	Quarterfinals	Semifinals	Repechage round 1	Repechage round 2	Final/ Bronze medal contest
Athlete	Event	Opposition Result	Opposition Result	Opposition Result	Opposition Result	Opposition Result	Opposition Result
Jani Kallunki	Men's 66kg	Lamri (ALG); W 1000-0000	Shabashov (RUS); L 0002C–0020S	N/A		Kail (GBR); W 1000-0001	Lee (TPE); W 1000-0000 (bronze)

=== Shooting ===
==== Men ====
Athlete	Event	Qualification		Final		
Athlete	Event	Score	Rank	Score	Total	Rank
Seppo Jolkkonen	Men's 10m air pistol SH1	558	9	did not advance		
Seppo Jolkkonen	Mixed 25m pistol SH1	565	4 Q	96.6	661.6	5
Kalevi Kaipainen	Mixed 10m air rifle prone SH2	596	16	did not advance		
Kalevi Kaipainen	Mixed 10m air rifle standing SH2	589	17	did not advance		
Veikko Palsamaki	Mixed 10m air rifle prone SH1	597	14	did not advance		
Veikko Palsamaki	Mixed 50m rifle prone SH1	589	5 Q	100.9	689.9	5
Erkki Pekkala	Mixed 10m air rifle prone SH1	597	14	did not advance		
Erkki Pekkala	Mixed 50m rifle prone SH1	573	27	did not advance		

==== Women ====
Athlete	Event	Qualification		Final		
Athlete	Event	Score	Rank	Score	Total	Rank
Sirkka Liisa Collin	Women's 10m air rifle standing SH1	381	10	did not advance		
Minna Leinonen	Mixed 10m air rifle prone SH2	600 =WR	1 Q	105.4	705.4	1st place, gold medalist(s)

=== Swimming ===
==== Men ====
Athlete	Class	Event	Heats		Final	
Athlete	Class	Event	Result	Rank	Result	Rank
Mikka Harju	S7	50m freestyle	32.85	13	did not advance	
Mikka Harju	S7	100m freestyle	1:12.18	10	did not advance	
Mikka Harju	S7	400m freestyle	5:43.53	11	did not advance	
Pekka Kantola	S2	50m freestyle	1:16.88	6 Q	1:15.36	6
Pekka Kantola	S2	100m freestyle	2:43.91	6 Q	2:46.07	7
Pekka Kantola	S2	200m freestyle	5:48.30	7 Q	5:39.52	6
Pekka Kantola	S2	50m backstroke	1:15.45	4 Q	1:14.42	4

==== Women ====
Athlete	Class	Event	Heats		Final	
Athlete	Class	Event	Result	Rank	Result	Rank
Reeta Peltola	S6	50m freestyle	39.66	5 Q	39.38	4
Reeta Peltola	S6	100m freestyle	1:23.99	2 Q	1:24.38	5
Reeta Peltola	SM6	200m individual medley	DNS		did not advance	

=== Table tennis ===
==== Men ====
Athlete	Event	Preliminaries				Quarterfinals	Semifinals	Final / BM	
Athlete	Event	Opposition Result	Opposition Result	Opposition Result	Rank	Opposition Result	Opposition Result	Opposition Result	Rank
Matti Launonen	Men's singles 1	Kang (KOR); W 3–0	Zumkehr (SUI); W 3–2	Maslup (ARG); W 3–0	1 Q	Nikelis (GER); L 1–3	did not advance		
Jari Kurkinen	Men's singles 2	Boury (FRA); W 3-0	Hajek (AUT); W 3-0	Mardani (IRI); W 3-0	1 Q	Kim (KOR); L 1-3	did not advance		
Matti Launonen; Jari Kurkinen	Men's teams 1-2	South Korea (KOR); L 0-3	Slovakia (SVK); L 0-3	Argentina (ARG); W 3-0	3	did not advance			

=== Volleyball ===
The men's volleyball team didn't win any medals; they were 5th out of 8 teams.

==== Players ====
- Martti Eronen
- Keijo Hanninen
- Timo Herranen
- Petri Kapiainen
- Jukka Laine
- Lauri Melanen
- Lasse Pakarinen
- Matti Pulli
- Sami Tervo
- Olavi Venalainen

==== Men's tournament ====
Game	Match	Score	Rank
1	Finland vs. Iran (IRI)	0 - 3	3
2	Finland vs. Germany (GER)	0 - 0	3
3	Finland vs. Japan (JPN)	3 - 0	3
Quarterfinals	Finland vs. Egypt (EGY)	1 - 3	L
Semifinals	Finland vs. Greece (GRE)	3 - 0	W
5th/6th classification	Finland vs. United States (USA)	3 - 0	5

The women's volleyball team didn't win any medals; they were 6th out of 6 teams.

==== Players ====
- Minna Hiltunen
- Tiina Jalo
- Annukka Jaattenmaki
- Liisa Jokipii
- Liisa Makela
- Anne Mari Maki
- Raisa Moller
- Maria Paavola
- Petra Pitkaniitty
- Paivi Sivula

==== Women's tournament ====
Game	Match	Score	Rank
1	Finland vs. China (CHN)	0 - 3	5
2	Finland vs. Netherlands (NED)	0 - 3	5
3	Finland vs. United States (USA)	2 - 3	5
4	Finland vs. Slovenia (SLO)	1 - 3	5
5	Finland vs. Ukraine (UKR)	3 - 2	5
5th/6th classification	Finland vs. Ukraine (UKR)	1 - 3	6

== See also ==
- Finland at the Paralympics
- Finland at the 2004 Summer Olympics
