= Table tennis at the 1960 Summer Paralympics =

Table-tennis at the 1960 Summer Paralympic Games

Table tennis at the I Paralympic Games
- Paralympic Table tennis

Table tennis at the 1960 Summer Paralympics consisted of eleven events, six for men and five for women.

== Medal table ==
Rank	Nation	Gold	Silver	Bronze	Total
1	Italy (ITA)	3	4	3	10
2	Austria (AUT)	3	2	1	6
3	Great Britain (GBR)	3	1	5	9
4	West Germany (FRG)	1	0	1	2
5	Belgium (BEL)	1	0	0	1
6	Australia (AUS)	0	1	0	1
6	Israel (ISR)	0	1	0	1
6	Malta (MLT)	0	1	0	1
6	Netherlands (NED)	0	1	0	1
10	Norway (NOR)	0	0	1	1
Totals (10 entries)		11	11	11	33

== Medal summary ==
=== Men's events ===
Event	Gold	Silver	Bronze
Singles A	Tommy Taylor; Great Britain	Domenico Cascella; Italy	M. Beck; Great Britain
Singles B	Engelbert Rangger; Austria	Francesco Scalzo; Italy	Federico Zarilli; Italy
Singles C	Giovanni Berghella; Italy	Moses Azzopardi; Malta	Federico Zarilli; Italy
Doubles A	Great Britain (GBR); M. Beck; Tommy Taylor	Netherlands (NED); Gerard Jacobs; Piet van Aart	Austria (AUT); Hans Paulhart; Heinz Schneider
Doubles B	Italy (ITA); Giovanni Ferraris; Federico Zarilli	Australia (AUS); Bill Mather-Brown; Bruno Moretti	Great Britain (GBR); Ronnie Foster; Phillips
Doubles C	Italy (ITA); Franco Rossi; Aroldo Ruschioni	Italy (ITA); Giovanni Ferraris; Federico Zarilli	Great Britain (GBR); Phillips; George Swindlehurst

=== Women's events ===
Event	Gold	Silver	Bronze
Singles A	Anderson; Great Britain	Mati Angel; Israel	Tora Lysoe; Norway
Singles B	Marlene Muhlendyck; West Germany	Manette Berger-Waldenegg; Austria	Anna Maria Toso; Italy
Singles C	Yvette Alloo; Belgium	Ilse Scharf; Austria	Diane Gubbin; Great Britain
Doubles B	Austria (AUT); Manette Berger-Waldenegg; Rosa Kuhnel	Italy (ITA); Maria Scutti; Anna Maria Toso	Great Britain (GBR); Froggart; Susan Masham
Doubles C	Austria (AUT); Manette Berger-Waldenegg; Ilse Scharf	Great Britain (GBR); Edwards; Diane Gubbin	West Germany (FRG); Marlene Muhlendyck; Christa Zander
