= Vincent Ward (swimmer) =

American paralympic swimmer

Personal information
- Born: Vincent Peter Ward; May 29, 1921 Rochester, New York, U.S.
- Died: September 22, 2016 (aged 95) Hamlin, New York, U.S.

Sport
- Country: United States
- Sport: Swimming
Medal record
Representing United States
Paralympic Games
Swimming
Silver medal – second place	1960 Rome	Men’s 25 m breaststroke complete class 2
Bronze medal – third place	1960 Rome	Men’s 25 m crawl complete class 2
Bronze medal – third place	1960 Rome	Men’s 25 m backstroke complete class 2

Vincent Peter Ward (May 29, 1921 – September 22, 2016) was an American paralympic swimmer. He competed at the 1960 and 1964 Summer Paralympics.

== Life and career ==
Ward was born in Rochester, New York, the son of Peter and Catherine Ward. He attended and graduated from Aquinas Institute. After graduating, he served in the United States Navy during World War II, which after his discharge, he worked as a watch repairman.

Ward competed at the 1960 Summer Paralympics, winning two bronze medals and a silver medal in swimming. He also competed in the men's 25 m freestyle supine complete class 1 event at the 1964 Summer Paralympics.

== Death ==
Ward died on September 22, 2016, in Hamlin, New York, at the age of 95.
