= Finland at the 2016 Summer Paralympics =

- IPC code: FIN
- NPC: Finnish Paralympic Committee
- Website: www.paralympia.fi/en

in Rio de Janeiro
- Competitors: 26 in 11 sports
- Medals Ranked 56th: Gold 1 Silver 1 Bronze 1 Total 3

Summer Paralympics appearances (overview)
- 1960; 1964; 1968; 1972; 1976; 1980; 1984; 1988; 1992; 1996; 2000; 2004; 2008; 2012; 2016; 2020; 2024

Finland competed at the 2016 Summer Paralympics in Rio de Janeiro, Brazil, from 7 September to 18 September 2016. They earned three medals, one gold, one silver and one bronze.

== Disability classifications ==
Every participant at the Paralympics has their disability grouped into one of five disability categories; amputation, the condition may be congenital or sustained through injury or illness; cerebral palsy; wheelchair athletes, there is often overlap between this and other categories; visual impairment, including blindness; Les autres, any physical disability that does not fall strictly under one of the other categories, for example dwarfism or multiple sclerosis. Each Paralympic sport then has its own classifications, dependent upon the specific physical demands of competition. Events are given a code, made of numbers and letters, describing the type of event and classification of the athletes competing. Some sports, such as athletics, divide athletes by both the category and severity of their disabilities, other sports, for example swimming, group competitors from different categories together, the only separation being based on the severity of the disability.

== Medalists ==
Medal	Name	Sport	Event	Class	Date
Gold	Leo-Pekka Tähti	Athletics	Men's 100 metres	T54	17 September
Silver	Marjaana Heikkinen	Athletics	Women's javelin throw	F34	9 September
Bronze	Henry Manni	Athletics	Men's 100 metres	T34	13 September

== Finnish Paralympic team ==
The Finnish Paralympic team consists of 26 athletes and 2 guide athletes, who compete in 11 sports. Chef de mission is Kimmo Mustonen.

Competitors from Finland per sport
Sport	Men	Women	Total	Guides
Archery	2	0	2	0
Athletics	4	3	7	1
Cycling	2	0	2	1
Equestrian	0	1	1	0
Goalball	6	0	6	0
Paratriathlon	0	1	1	0
Powerlifting	1	0	1	0
Sailing	1	0	1	0
Shooting	0	1	1	0
Swimming	2	1	3	0
Table tennis	1	0	1	0
Total	19	7	26	2

== Archery ==
Jere Forsberg earned Finland a spot at the Rio Games following his performance at the 2015 World Archery Para Championships. He qualified the country after his performance in the compound men's open. Jean Pierre Antonios earned Finland a second qualifying spot after making the round of eight in the W1 men event.

Athlete	Event and classification	Ranking round		1/16 Eliminations	1/8 Eliminations	Quarterfinals	Semifinals	Finals	Final rank
Athlete	Event and classification	Score	Rank	Opposition Score	Opposition Score	Opposition Score	Opposition Score	Opposition Score	Final rank
Jean-Pierre Antonios	Men's individual compound W1	594	12	—N/a	Walker (GBR); L 131–123	did not advance			9
Jere Forsberg	Men's individual compound open	672	10	Dudka (POL); W 141–136	Simonelli (ITA); L 136–140	did not advance			9

Legend: W = win, L = loss

== Athletics ==
=== Track and road events ===
Athlete	Event and classification	Round 1		Semifinals		Final	
Athlete	Event and classification	Result	Rank	Result	Rank	Result	Rank
Henry Manni	Men's 100 metres T34	15.78 SB	3 Q	—N/a		15.46 PB	3rd place, bronze medalist(s)
Henry Manni	Men's 800 metres T34	1:47.51	6 Q	—N/a		1:41.92 RR	4
Esa-Pekka Mattila	Men's 100 metres T54	15.07 SB	11	—N/a		did not advance	
Amanda Kotaja	Women's 100 metres T54	16.76	6 Q	—N/a		16.47	6
Amanda Kotaja	Women's 400 metres T54	59.17 SB	10	—N/a		did not advance	
Ronja Oja; Guide: Jesper Oja	Women's 100 metres T11	13.39 NR	13	did not advance			
Toni Piispanen	Men's 100 metres T51	—N/a				22.02	4
Toni Piispanen	Men's 400 metres T51	—N/a				1:30.27	6
Leo-Pekka Tähti	Men's 100 metres T54	14.00	1 Q	—N/a		13.90	1st place, gold medalist(s)

Legend: SB = season best, Q = qualified by place, PB = personal best, RR = European record, NR = Finnish record

=== Field events ===
Athlete	Event and classification	Final	
Athlete	Event and classification	Result	Rank
Marjaana Heikkinen	Women's javelin throw F34	18.42 SB	2nd place, silver medalist(s)
Marjaana Heikkinen	Women's shot put F34	6.26	7
Ronja Oja; Guide: Jesper Oja	Women's long jump T11	4.30 =PB	9

Legend: SB = season best, PB = personal best

== Cycling ==
With one pathway for qualification being one highest ranked NPCs on the UCI Para-Cycling male and female Nations Ranking Lists on 31 December 2014, Finland qualified for the 2016 Summer Paralympics in Rio, assuming they continued to meet all other eligibility requirements.

Athlete	Event and classification	Time	Rank
Jarmo Ollanketo; Pilot: Tommi Martikainen	Men's road race B	2:32:09	10
Jarmo Ollanketo; Pilot: Tommi Martikainen	Men's road time trial B	36:39.83	9
Jani Peltopuro	Men's road race H3	1:39:25	8
Jani Peltopuro	Men's road time trial H3	32:32.81	10

== Equestrian ==
The country earned an individual slot via the Para Equestrian Individual Ranking List Allocation method.

Athlete	Horse	Event and grade	Total	
Athlete	Horse	Event and grade	Score	Rank
Katja Karjalainen	Woikoski High Flow	Individual championship test grade Ia	71.043	7
Katja Karjalainen	Woikoski High Flow	Individual Freestyle test grade Ia	71.850	7

== Goalball ==
The Finland men's national goalball team qualified for the Rio Games after finishing second at the 2014 IBSA Goalball World Championships. Finnish women failed to qualify at the 2014 World Championships, finishing two spots out of medal contention in fifth place at the home hosted event. Finland's men enter the tournament ranked 6th in the world.

The following is the Finland roster in the men's goalball tournament of the 2016 Summer Paralympics.

No.	Player	Class	Date of birth (age)
1	Jarno Mattila	B2	1 January 1985 (aged 31)
2	Ville Montonen	B2	27 April 1986 (aged 30)
4	Erkki Miinala	B1	19 August 1986 (aged 30)
6	Markus Tihumäki	B1	29 January 1994 (aged 22)
8	Miika Honkanen	B2	21 July 1989 (aged 27)
9	Petri Posio	B2	17 May 1983 (aged 33)

Team	Event	Preliminary					Quarterfinals	Semifinals	Gold / Bronze	Rank
Team	Event	Opposition Score	Opposition Score	Opposition Score	Opposition Score	Rank	Opposition Score	Opposition Score	Opposition Score	Rank
Finland men's	Men's tournament	Lithuania (LTU); L 6–13	Turkey (TUR); L 5–8	United States (USA); L 2–6	China (CHN); W 11–7	5	did not advance			9

Legend: W = win, L = loss

== Paratriathlon ==
Athlete	Event and classification	Swim (750 m)		Transition 1		Bike (22.28 km)		Transition 2		Run (5.0 km)		Total Time	Rank
Athlete	Event and classification	Time	Rank	Time	Rank	Time	Rank	Time	Rank	Time	Rank	Total Time	Rank
Liisa Lilja	Women's PT2	13:00	4	2:23	4	43:43	4	1:21	5	25:34	2	1:26:01	4

== Powerlifting ==
Athlete	Event	Best lift (kg)	Rank
Juhani Kokko	Men's 59 kg	145	6

== Sailing ==
One pathway for qualifying for Rio involved having a boat have top seven finish at the 2015 Combined World Championships in a medal event where the country had nor already qualified through via the 2014 IFDS Sailing World Championships. Finland qualified for the 2016 Games under this criterion in the 2.4m event with a thirteenth-place finish overall and the third country who had not qualified via the 2014 Championships. The boat was crewed by Niko Salomaa.

Athlete	Event	Points per Race											Net points	Final rank
Athlete	Event	1	2	3	4	5	6	7	8	9	10	11	Net points	Final rank
Niko Salomaa	1-Person Keelboat (2.4mR)	9	11	7	9	9	7	~~14~~	9	4	6	8	79	8

Legend: ~~14~~ = excluded score

== Shooting ==
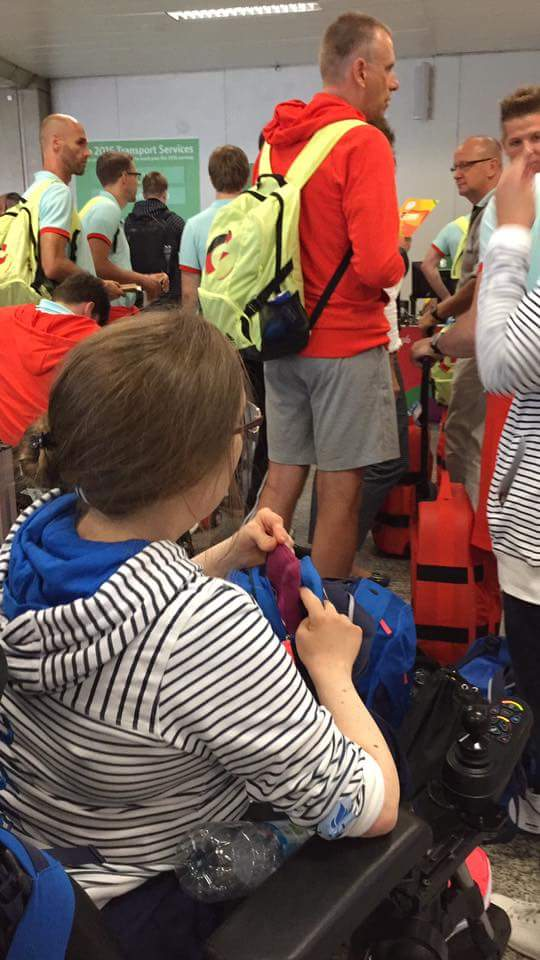
Finland's shooter at the Rio airport waiting for accreditation.

The first opportunity to qualify for shooting at the Rio Games took place at the 2014 IPC Shooting World Championships in Suhl. Shooters earned spots for their NPC. Finland earned a qualifying spot at this competition in the R5 – 10m Air Rifle Prone Mixed SH2 event as a result of the performance of Minna Sinikka Leinonen.

Athlete	Event and classification	Qualification		Final	
Athlete	Event and classification	Points	Rank	Points	Rank
Minna Leinonen	Mixed 10 metre air rifle prone SH2	630.9	18	did not advance	

== Swimming ==
Athlete	Event and classification	Heats		Final	
Athlete	Event and classification	Result	Rank	Result	Rank
Antti Latikka	Men's 50m Freestyle S13	26.22	16	did not advance	
Antti Latikka	Men's 100m Backstroke S13	1:01.93	5 Q	1:02.84	6
Antti Latikka	Men's 100m Butterfly S13	1:03.72	17	did not advance	
Antti Latikka	Men's 200m Individual Medley SM13	2:23.70	13	did not advance	
Leo Lähteenmäki	Men's 50 metre freestyle S9	26.74	10	did not advance	
Leo Lähteenmäki	Men's 100 metre butterfly S9	1:09.43	14	did not advance	
Leo Lähteenmäki	Men's 100 metre freestyle S9	59.08	15	did not advance	
Meri-Maari Mäkinen	Women's 50m Butterfly S7	44.52	10	did not advance	
Meri-Maari Mäkinen	Women's 100m Backstroke S7	1:39.56	14	did not advance	
Meri-Maari Mäkinen	Women's 100m Breaststroke SB7	1:59.79	11	did not advance	
Meri-Maari Mäkinen	Women's 200m Individual Medley SM7	Disqualified		did not advance	

Legend: Q = qualified for the next phase

== Table tennis ==
Athlete	Event and classification	Preliminaries			Round 1	Quarterfinals	Semifinals	Finals	Rank
Athlete	Event and classification	Opposition Result	Opposition Result	Rank	Opposition Result	Opposition Result	Opposition Result	Opposition Result	Rank
Esa Miettinen	Men's individual C9	Cabestany (FRA); L 0–3	Last (NED); L 2–3	3	did not advance				

Legend: L = loss

== See also ==
- Finland at the 2016 Summer Olympics
