= Argentina at the 2004 Summer Paralympics =

- IPC code: ARG
- NPC: Argentine Paralympic Committee
- Website: www.coparg.org.ar

in Athens
- Competitors: 55 in 10 sports
- Medals Ranked 62nd: Gold 0 Silver 2 Bronze 2 Total 4

Summer Paralympics appearances (overview)
- 1960; 1964; 1968; 1972; 1976; 1980; 1984; 1988; 1992; 1996; 2000; 2004; 2008; 2012; 2016; 2020; 2024

Argentina competed at the 2004 Summer Paralympics in Athens, Greece. The team included fifty-five athletes, forty-four men and eleven women. Argentinian competitors won four medals, two silver and two bronze to finish sixty-second in the medal table.

== Medallists ==
Medal	Name	Sport	Event
Silver	Gonsalo Abbas Hachache; Diego Cerega; Eduardo Diaz; Carlos Ivan Figueroa; Dario Lencina; Antonio Mendoza; Oscar Moreno; Julio Ramirez; Lucas Rodríguez; Silvio Velo	Football 5-a-side	Men's team
Silver	Guillermo Marro	Swimming	Men's 100m backstroke S7
Bronze	Rodrigo Lopez	Cycling	Men's bicycle road race/time trial CP 3
Bronze	Betiana Basualdo	Swimming	Women's 100m freestyle S2

== Sports ==
=== Athletics ===
==== Men's track ====
Athlete	Class	Event	Heats		Semifinal		Final	
Athlete	Class	Event	Result	Rank	Result	Rank	Result	Rank
Pablo Astoreca	T11	Marathon	—N/a				3:30:37	10
Ernesto Margni	T35	100m	15.67	9	Did not advance			
Ernesto Margni	T35	200m	—N/a				34.32	6
Alejandro Maldonado	T54	100m	15.16	14	Did not advance			
Alejandro Maldonado	T54	200m	27.54	17	Did not advance			
Gaston Torres	T37	800m	DNS		Did not advance			
Gaston Torres	T37	1500m	—N/a				5:15.51	11

==== Men's field ====
Athlete	Class	Event	Final		
Athlete	Class	Event	Result	Points	Rank
Sebastian Baldassarri	F11	Shot put	11.81	-	4
Horacio Bascioni	F52	Discus	15.96	-	4
Horacio Bascioni	F52-53	Javelin	13.53	847	13
Ernesto Margni	F35	Discus	26.81	-	10

==== Women's track ====
Athlete	Class	Event	Heats		Semifinal		Final	
Athlete	Class	Event	Result	Rank	Result	Rank	Result	Rank
Maria Rosales	T34	100m	—N/a				24.81	5
Maria Rosales	T34	200m	—N/a				48.52	5

==== Women's field ====
Athlete	Class	Event	Final		
Athlete	Class	Event	Result	Points	Rank
Mariela Almada	F12	Shot put	9.81	-	8
Mariela Almada	F13	Discus	35.20	-	6
Perla Amanda Munoz	F35/36	Shot put	7.25	1043	6
Perla Amanda Munoz	F35/36/38	Discus	17.20	970	9
Perla Amanda Munoz	F35-38	Javelin	17.82	1011	6

=== Boccia ===
Athlete	Event	Preliminaries			Round of 16	Quarterfinals	Semifinals	Final	
Athlete	Event	Opponent	Opposition Score	Rank	Opposition Score	Opposition Score	Opposition Score	Opposition Score	Rank
Mauricio Ibarburen	Mixed individual BC1	Jorgensen (DEN)	L 0-10	3	Did not advance				
Mauricio Ibarburen	Mixed individual BC1	Grossmayer (AUT)	L 3-11	3	Did not advance				
Mauricio Ibarburen	Mixed individual BC1	Hawker (USA)	W 5-3	3	Did not advance				
Mauricio Ibarburen	Mixed individual BC1	Lanoix-Boyer (CAN)	W 7-5	3	Did not advance				
Gabriela Villano	Mixed individual BC1	Beltran (ESP)	L 3-9	5	Did not advance				
Gabriela Villano	Mixed individual BC1	Taksee (THA)	W 7-4	5	Did not advance				
Gabriela Villano	Mixed individual BC1	Shelly (IRL)	L 0-11	5	Did not advance				
Gabriela Villano	Mixed individual BC1	Pearse (GBR)	L 2-7	5	Did not advance				
Gabriela Villano	Mixed individual BC1	Gahleitner (AUT)	W 5-1	5	Did not advance				
Pablo Cortez	Mixed individual BC2	Curto (ESP)	L 1-6	2 Q	Cordero (ESP); L 0-4	Did not advance			
Pablo Cortez	Mixed individual BC2	Loung (HKG)	W 4-2	2 Q	Cordero (ESP); L 0-4	Did not advance			
Pablo Cortez	Mixed individual BC2	Bourbonniere (CAN)	W 6-3	2 Q	Cordero (ESP); L 0-4	Did not advance			
Claudio Scalise	Mixed individual BC2	F Ferreira (POR)	L 3-4	3	Did not advance				
Claudio Scalise	Mixed individual BC2	Connolly (IRL)	L 1-4	3	Did not advance				
Claudio Scalise	Mixed individual BC2	Kwok (HKG)	W 4-1	3	Did not advance				
Vanina Ledesma	Mixed individual BC4	Dueso (ESP)	L 1-5	5	Did not advance				
Vanina Ledesma	Mixed individual BC4	de Oliveira Pereira (POR)	L 2-3	5	Did not advance				
Vanina Ledesma	Mixed individual BC4	Bogdos (GRE)	L 1-9	5	Did not advance				
Vanina Ledesma	Mixed individual BC4	Vandervies (CAN)	W 7-2	5	Did not advance				
Pablo Cortez; Mauricio Ibarburen; Claudio Scalise; Gabriela Villano	Mixed team BC1/2	Spain (ESP)	W 8-7	4	—N/a		Did not advance		
Pablo Cortez; Mauricio Ibarburen; Claudio Scalise; Gabriela Villano	Mixed team BC1/2	Great Britain (GBR)	L 0-9	4	—N/a		Did not advance		
Pablo Cortez; Mauricio Ibarburen; Claudio Scalise; Gabriela Villano	Mixed team BC1/2	Austria (AUT)	L 3-5	4	—N/a		Did not advance		
Pablo Cortez; Mauricio Ibarburen; Claudio Scalise; Gabriela Villano	Mixed team BC1/2	Canada (CAN)	W 5-4	4	—N/a		Did not advance		
Pablo Cortez; Mauricio Ibarburen; Claudio Scalise; Gabriela Villano	Mixed team BC1/2	Norway (NOR)	L 6-7	4	—N/a		Did not advance		

=== Cycling ===
==== Men's road ====
Athlete	Event	Time	Rank
Rodrigo Lopez	Men's road race/time trial CP div 3	-	3rd place, bronze medalist(s)

==== Men's track ====
Athlete	Event	Qualification		1st round		Final	
Athlete	Event	Time	Rank	Time	Rank	Opposition Time	Rank
Rodrigo Lopez	Men's 1km time trial CP div 3/4	—N/a				1:16.27	9
Rodrigo Lopez	Men's individual pursuit CP div 3	4:17.98	6	Did not advance			

=== Equestrian ===
Athlete	Event	Total	
Athlete	Event	Score	Rank
Patricio Guglialmelli	Mixed individual championship test grade III	63.600	10
Patricio Guglialmelli	Mixed individual freestyle test grade III	69.278	7

=== Football 5-a-side ===
The men's football team won a silver medal after being defeated by Brazil in the gold medal match.

==== Players ====
- Gonsalo Abbas Hachache
- Diego Cerega
- Eduardo Diaz
- Carlos Ivan Figueroa
- Dario Lencina
- Antonio Mendoza
- Oscar Moreno
- Julio Ramirez
- Lucas Rodríguez
- Silvio Velo

==== Tournament ====
Game	Match	Score	Rank
1	Argentina vs. Brazil (BRA)	0 - 2	2 Q
2	Argentina vs. Spain (ESP)	2 - 1	2 Q
3	Argentina vs. Greece (GRE)	2 - 1	2 Q
4	Argentina vs. France (FRA)	3 - 0	2 Q
5	Argentina vs. South Korea (KOR)	3 - 0	2 Q
Gold medal final	Argentina vs. Brazil (BRA)	0 - 0 (2-3)	2nd place, silver medalist(s)

=== Football 7-a-side ===
The men's football 7-a-side team didn't win any medals: they were defeated by Russia in the bronze medal match.

==== Players ====
- Claudio Bastias
- Diego Canals
- Carlos Cardinal
- Claudio Conte
- Ezequiel Jaime
- Emiliano Lopez
- Claudio Morinigo
- Gustavo Nahuelquin
- Matias Nunez
- Damian Pereyra
- Javier Sosa
- Mario Sosa

==== Tournament ====
Game	Match	Score	Rank
1	Argentina vs. Ukraine (UKR)	2 - 2	2 Q
2	Argentina vs. Iran (IRI)	2 - 2	2 Q
3	Argentina vs. Ireland (IRL)	5 - 2	2 Q
Semifinals	Argentina vs. Brazil (BRA)	1 - 4	L
Gold medal final	Argentina vs. Russia (RUS)	0 - 5	4

=== Judo ===
==== Men ====
Athlete	Event	Preliminary	Quarterfinals	Semifinals	Repechage round 1	Repechage round 2	Final/ Bronze medal contest
Athlete	Event	Opposition Result	Opposition Result	Opposition Result	Opposition Result	Opposition Result	Opposition Result
Sergio Arturo Diaz	Men's 60kg	Bye	Rahmati (IRI); L 0000–0210	—N/a	Tsang (HKG); W 1000S-0001	Zasyadkovych (UKR); L 0001C-0131S	Did not advance
Fabian Ramirez	Men's 73kg	Asakereh (IRI); L 0010S-1001	Did not advance				

=== Swimming ===
==== Men ====
Athlete	Class	Event	Heats		Final	
Athlete	Class	Event	Result	Rank	Result	Rank
Fernando Carlomagno	S6	400m freestyle	6:09.16	12	Did not advance	
Sebastian Facundo Ramirez	S5	50m backstroke	49.31	9	Did not advance	
Sebastian Facundo Ramirez	SB4	100m breaststroke	2:07.46	10	Did not advance	
Sebastian Facundo Ramirez	SM4	150m individual medley	2:51.76	5 Q	2:42.57	3rd place, bronze medalist(s)
Guillermo Marro	S7	100m backstroke	1:16.64	2 Q	1:16.98	2nd place, silver medalist(s)
Mateo Micic	S1	50m freestyle	—N/a		2:34.93	7
Mateo Micic	S1	50m backstroke	—N/a		2:22.77	5
Diego Pastore	S6	400m freestyle	6:26.71	14	Did not advance	
Diego Pastore	S6	100m backstroke	1:30.08	10	Did not advance	
Marcelo Ariel Quassi	S5	50m butterfly	50.80	9	Did not advance	
Marcelo Ariel Quassi	SB4	100m breaststroke	2:00.53	7 Q	1:59.40	6
Marcelo Ariel Quassi	SM5	200m individual medley	3:45.44	7 Q	3:48.00	8

==== Women ====
Athlete	Class	Event	Heats		Final	
Athlete	Class	Event	Result	Rank	Result	Rank
Betiana Basualdo	S2	50m freestyle	—N/a		1:33.11	4
Betiana Basualdo	S2	100m freestyle	—N/a		3:17.93	3rd place, bronze medalist(s)
Betiana Basualdo	S2	50m backstroke	—N/a		1:35.88	4
Valeria Fantasia	SB4	100m breaststroke	2:11.81	8 Q	2:12.35	8
Anabel Moro	SB12	100m breaststroke	1:32.58	9	Did not advance	
Alejandra Perezlindo	S2	50m freestyle	—N/a		1:48.61	6
Alejandra Perezlindo	S2	100m freestyle	—N/a		3:40.11	6
Alejandra Perezlindo	S2	50m backstroke	—N/a		1:48.66	6

=== Table tennis ===
==== Men ====
Athlete	Event	Preliminaries				Quarterfinals	Semifinals	Final / BM	
Athlete	Event	Opposition Result	Opposition Result	Opposition Result	Rank	Opposition Result	Opposition Result	Opposition Result	Rank
Jose Daniel Haylan	Men's singles 1	Kilger (GER); L 1–3	Cho (KOR); L 1–3	Fouillen (FRA); W 3–0	2 Q	Kang (KOR); L 2–3	Did not advance		
Carlos Maslup	Men's singles 1	Launonen (FIN); L 0-3	Kang (KOR); L 0-3	Zumkehr (SUI); L 1-3	4	Did not advance			
Jose Daniel Haylan; Carlos Maslup	Men's teams 1-2	South Korea (KOR); L 0-3	Slovakia (SVK); L 0-3	Finland (FIN); L 0-3	4	Did not advance			

==== Women ====
Athlete	Event	Preliminaries				Quarterfinals	Semifinals	Final / BM	
Athlete	Event	Opposition Result	Opposition Result	Opposition Result	Rank	Opposition Result	Opposition Result	Opposition Result	Rank
Giselle Munoz	Women's singles 6	Bengtsson Kovacs (SWE); L 0–3	Ovsjannikova (RUS); L 0–3	Darvand (FRA); L 0–3	4	Did not advance			

=== Wheelchair fencing ===
Athlete	Event	Qualification			Round of 16	Quarterfinal	Semifinal	Final / BM	
Athlete	Event	Opposition	Score	Rank	Opposition Score	Opposition Score	Opposition Score	Opposition Score	Rank
Susana Masciotra	Women's épée B	Wyrzykowska (POL)	L 1–5	5	Did not advance				
Susana Masciotra	Women's épée B	Vettraino (ITA)	L 0-5	5	Did not advance				
Susana Masciotra	Women's épée B	Lykyanenko (UKR)	L 1-5	5	Did not advance				
Susana Masciotra	Women's épée B	Hassen Bey (ESP)	L 0-5	5	Did not advance				
Susana Masciotra	Women's foil B	Chan Y C (HKG)	L 0-5	5	Did not advance				
Susana Masciotra	Women's foil B	Hassen Bey (ESP)	L 0-5	5	Did not advance				
Susana Masciotra	Women's foil B	Wyrzykowska (POL)	L 0-5	5	Did not advance				
Susana Masciotra	Women's foil B	Lykyanenko (UKR)	L 3-5	5	Did not advance				

=== Wheelchair tennis ===
Athlete	Class	Event	Round of 64	Round of 32	Round of 16	Quarterfinals	Semifinals	Finals
Athlete	Class	Event	Opposition Result	Opposition Result	Opposition Result	Opposition Result	Opposition Result	Opposition Result
Oscar Diaz	Open	Men's singles	Hall (AUS); L 0–6, 1-6	Did not advance				

== See also ==
- Argentina at the Paralympics
- Argentina at the 2004 Summer Olympics
