= Finland at the 2008 Summer Paralympics =

- IPC code: FIN
- NPC: Finnish Paralympic Committee
- Website: www.paralympia.fi/en

in Beijing
- Competitors: 30 in 13 sports
- Medals Ranked 40th: Gold 2 Silver 2 Bronze 2 Total 6

Summer Paralympics appearances (overview)
- 1960; 1964; 1968; 1972; 1976; 1980; 1984; 1988; 1992; 1996; 2000; 2004; 2008; 2012; 2016; 2020; 2024

Finland competed at the 2008 Summer Paralympics in Beijing. Athletes were selected by the Finnish Paralympic Committee on July 2, 2008.

== Medalists ==
Medal	Name	Sport	Event
Gold	Markku Niinimäki	Athletics	Men's javelin throw F53/54
Gold	Leo-Pekka Tähti	Athletics	Men's 100 metres T54
Silver	Markku Niinimäki	Athletics	Men's shot put F53–54
Silver	Jarmo Ollanketo	Cycling	Men's road race B&VI 1–3
Bronze	Jani Kallunki	Judo	Men's 66kgX1
Bronze	Leo-Pekka Tähti	Athletics	Men's 200 metres T54

== Sports ==
=== Archery ===
Athlete	Event	Ranking round		Round of 32	Round of 16	Quarterfinals	Semifinals	Finals	
Athlete	Event	Score	Seed	Opposition score	Opposition score	Opposition score	Opposition score	Opposition score	Rank
Keijo Kallunki	Men's individual compound	675	11	Bye	Bailey (USA); L 110-115	did not advance			
Jean-Pierre Antonios	Men's individual compound standing	606	8	—	Lehner (SUI); L 89-94	did not advance			
Osmo Kinnunen	Men's individual compound standing	627	4	—	Bye	Murphy (CAN); W 111-97	Drahoninsky (CZE); L 97-99	Fabry (USA); L 101-111	4

=== Athletics ===
==== Men's track ====
Athlete	Class	Event	Heats		Final	
Athlete	Class	Event	Result	Rank	Result	Rank
Leo-Pekka Tähti	T54	100m	13.76 WR	1 Q	13.81	1st place, gold medalist(s)
Leo-Pekka Tähti	T54	200m	24.92	2 Q	25.17	3rd place, bronze medalist(s)

==== Men's field ====
Athlete	Class	Event	Final		
Athlete	Class	Event	Result	Points	Rank
Markku Niinimaki	F53-54	Javelin throw	29.33 WR	1112	1st place, gold medalist(s)
Markku Niinimaki	F53-54	Shot put	9.92 WR	1021	2nd place, silver medalist(s)

==== Women's field ====
Athlete	Class	Event	Final		
Athlete	Class	Event	Result	Points	Rank
Tiina Ala-Aho	F33-34/52-53	Javelin throw	11.51	849	15
Marjaana Väre	F42-46	Javelin throw	26.63	906	9

=== Boccia ===
Athlete	Event	Preliminaries			Quarterfinals	Semifinals	Final	
Athlete	Event	Opponent	Opposition Score	Rank	Opposition Score	Opposition Score	Opposition Score	Rank
Leena Sarela	Mixed individual BC1	Fernandes (POR)	L 3-4	5	did not advance			
Leena Sarela	Mixed individual BC1	Vaquerizo (ESP)	L 2-3	5	did not advance			
Leena Sarela	Mixed individual BC1	Zhang Q (CHN)	L 2-3	5	did not advance			
Leena Sarela	Mixed individual BC1	Leung M Y (HKG)	L 2-3	5	did not advance			
Vesa Koivuniemi	Mixed individual BC2	Cordero (ESP)	L 0-15	4	did not advance			
Vesa Koivuniemi	Mixed individual BC2	Yan Z (CHN)	L 1-8	4	did not advance			
Vesa Koivuniemi	Mixed individual BC2	McLeod (CAN)	L 2-9	4	did not advance			
Timo Ollikka	Mixed individual BC2	Uchida (JPN)	L 0-6	3	did not advance			
Timo Ollikka	Mixed individual BC2	Dukovich (CAN)	L 1-4	3	did not advance			
Timo Ollikka	Mixed individual BC2	Robinson (GBR)	W 5-2	3	did not advance			
Vesa Koivuniemi; Timo Ollikka; Leena Sarela	Mixed team BC1-2	Spain (ESP)	L 1-16	3	did not advance			
Vesa Koivuniemi; Timo Ollikka; Leena Sarela	Mixed team BC1-2	Ireland (IRL)	L 3-7	3	did not advance			

=== Cycling ===
==== Men's road ====
Athlete	Event	Time	Rank
Jarmo Ollanketo; Marko Törmänen (pilot)	Men's road race B&VI 1-3	2:14:45	2nd place, silver medalist(s)
Jarmo Ollanketo; Marko Törmänen (pilot)	Men's road time trial B&VI 1-3	33:36.96	9

=== Equestrian ===
Athlete	Horse	Event	Total	
Athlete	Horse	Event	Score	Rank
Katja Karjalainen	Callan	Mixed individual championship test grade Ib	65.714	4
Katja Karjalainen	Callan	Mixed individual freestyle test grade Ib	64.999	7

=== Goalball ===
The men's team didn't win any medals; they were 7th out of 12 teams.

==== Players ====
- Veli-Matti Aittola
- Toni Alenius
- Jorma Kivinen
- Jarno Mattila
- Erkki Miinala
- Petri Posio

==== Tournament ====
7 September 2008

Finland	2 - 7	Slovenia

Beijing Institute of Technology Gymnasium
8 September 2008

Lithuania	15 - 5	Finland

Beijing Institute of Technology Gymnasium
9 September 2008

Finland	4 - 11	Denmark

Beijing Institute of Technology Gymnasium
10 September 2008

Belgium	5 - 8	Finland

Beijing Institute of Technology Gymnasium
11 September 2008

Finland	7 - 3	Spain

Beijing Institute of Technology Gymnasium

Quarterfinals

12 September 2008

China	7 - 6	Finland

Beijing Institute of Technology Gymnasium

5-8th classification

13 September 2008

Finland	5 - 6	Canada

Beijing Institute of Technology Gymnasium

7/8th classification

14 September 2008

Slovenia	5 - 6	Finland

Beijing Institute of Technology Gymnasium

=== Judo ===
Athlete	Event	First Round	Quarterfinals	Semifinals	Repechage round 1	Repechage round 2	Final/ Bronze medal contest
Athlete	Event	Opposition Result	Opposition Result	Opposition Result	Opposition Result	Opposition Result	Opposition Result
Jani Kallunki	Men's 66kg	Villemont (FRA); W 1010–0000	Fujimoto (JPN); L 0000-0101	—	Bye	Falcon (VEN); W 1000-0000	Golmohammadi (IRI); W 1000-0000 (bronze)
Rauno Peltoniemi	Men's 73kg	Pourabbas (IRI); L 0000-1011	did not advance				

=== Powerlifting ===
Athlete	Event	Result	Rank
Juhani Kokko	52kg	135.0	11
Janne Piipponen	82.5kg	172.5	8

=== Sailing ===
Finland received one national entry to the 2008 Summer Paralympics sailing events:

Men

- Juhani Mattila (Single-Person Keelboat - 2.4mR)

=== Shooting ===
==== Men ====
Athlete	Event	Qualification		Final		
Athlete	Event	Score	Rank	Score	Total	Rank
Tapani Merilainen	Mixed 10m air rifle prone SH1	592	37	did not advance		
Tapani Merilainen	Mixed 50m rifle prone SH1	566	39	did not advance		
Veikko Palsamaki	Mixed 10m air rifle prone SH1	596	25	did not advance		
Veikko Palsamaki	Mixed 50m rifle prone SH1	579	30	did not advance		
Erkki Pekkala	Mixed 10m air rifle prone SH1	595	29	did not advance		
Erkki Pekkala	Mixed 50m rifle prone SH1	584	12	did not advance		

==== Women ====
Athlete	Event	Qualification		Final		
Athlete	Event	Score	Rank	Score	Total	Rank
Minna Leinonen	Mixed 10m air rifle prone SH2	598	11	did not advance		

=== Swimming ===
Athlete	Class	Event	Heats		Final	
Athlete	Class	Event	Result	Rank	Result	Rank
Antti Latikka	S13	100m backstroke	1:08.43	8 Q	1:08.07	7

=== Table tennis ===
Athlete	Event	Preliminaries			Quarterfinals	Semifinals	Final / BM	
Athlete	Event	Opposition Result	Opposition Result	Rank	Opposition Result	Opposition Result	Opposition Result	Rank
Esa Miettinen	Men's singles C9-10	Leibovitz (USA); W 3–1	Heijnen (NED); W 3–0	1 Q	Ma L (CHN); L 0–3	did not advance		

=== Wheelchair tennis ===
Athlete	Event	Round of 64	Round of 32	Round of 16	Quarterfinals	Semifinals	Finals
Athlete	Event	Opposition Result	Opposition Result	Opposition Result	Opposition Result	Opposition Result	Opposition Result
Taneli Tenhunen	Men's singles	Okur (TUR); W 7–5, 6–3	Olsson (SWE); L 1-6, 1-6	did not advance			

== See also ==
- 2008 Summer Paralympics
- Finland at the Paralympics
- Finland at the 2008 Summer Olympics
