= Argentina at the 1996 Summer Paralympics =

- IPC code: ARG
- NPC: Argentine Paralympic Committee
- Website: www.coparg.org.ar

in Atlanta
- Competitors: 56 (49 men and 7 women)
- Medals Ranked 38th: Gold 2 Silver 5 Bronze 2 Total 9

Summer Paralympics appearances (overview)
- 1960; 1964; 1968; 1972; 1976; 1980; 1984; 1988; 1992; 1996; 2000; 2004; 2008; 2012; 2016; 2020; 2024

56 athletes (49 men and 7 women) from Argentina competed at the 1996 Summer Paralympics in Atlanta, United States.

== Medallists ==
Medal	Name	Sport	Event
Gold	Suarez Nestor	Athletics	Men's 100m T34
Gold	Betiana Basualdo	Swimming	Women's 100m freestyle S2
Silver	Fabian Ramirez	Judo	Men's 78 kg
Silver	Horácio Bascioni	Athletics	Men's discus F51
Silver	María Angélica Rodríguez	Athletics	Women's discus F34-35
Silver	Betiana Basualdo	Swimming	Women's 50m freestyle S2
Silver	Alejandra Perezlindo	Swimming	Women's 100m freestyle S2
Bronze	Betiana Basualdo	Swimming	Women's 50m backstroke S2
Bronze	José Daniel Haylan	Table tennis	Men's singles 1

== See also ==
- Argentina at the Paralympics
- Argentina at the 1996 Summer Olympics
