= Finland at the 2000 Summer Paralympics =

- IPC code: FIN
- NPC: Finnish Paralympic Committee
- Website: www.paralympia.fi/en

in Sydney
- Competitors: 50 (39 male, 11 female)
- Medals Ranked 43rd: Gold 1 Silver 3 Bronze 6 Total 10

Summer Paralympics appearances (overview)
- 1960; 1964; 1968; 1972; 1976; 1980; 1984; 1988; 1992; 1996; 2000; 2004; 2008; 2012; 2016; 2020; 2024

There were 11 female and 39 male athletes representing the country at the 2000 Summer Paralympics.

== Medallists ==
Medal	Name	Sport	Event
Gold	Tiina Ala-Aho	Athletics	Women's shot put F33-34
Silver	Mikael Saleva	Athletics	Men's javelin F55
Silver	Erkki Pekkala	Shooting	Mixed air rifle prone SH1
Silver	Matti Launonen	Table tennis	Men's singles 1
Bronze	Rauno Saunavaara	Athletics	Men's javelin F54
Bronze	Marita Tevali	Equestrian	Mixed dressage freestyle grade IV
Bronze	Pekka Kantola	Swimming	Men's 50m backstroke S2
Bronze	Eeva Riitta Fingerroos	Swimming	Women's 100m freestyle S11
Bronze	Kimmo Jokinen	Table tennis	Men's singles 8
Bronze	Veli-Matti Tuominen; Matti Pulli; Olavi Venalainen; Aulis Vistbacka; Lauri Melanen; Sami Tervo; Petri Kapiainen; Jukka Laine; Jari Heino; Keijo Hanninen; Allan Pynnonen	Volleyball	Men's sitting

== See also ==
- Finland at the 2000 Summer Olympics
- Finland at the Paralympics

== Bibliography ==
- International Paralympic Committee (2000). "Appendix C: Athlete Numbers - By Delegation". Sydney 2000 Paralympic Games Post Games Report. Sydney.
