= Argentina at the 1968 Summer Paralympics =

- IPC code: ARG
- NPC: Argentine Paralympic Committee
- Website: www.coparg.org.ar

in Tel Aviv
- Competitors: 21
- Medals Ranked 9th: Gold 10 Silver 10 Bronze 10 Total 30

Summer Paralympics appearances (overview)
- 1960; 1964; 1968; 1972; 1976; 1980; 1984; 1988; 1992; 1996; 2000; 2004; 2008; 2012; 2016; 2020; 2024

Argentina competed at the 1968 Summer Paralympics in Tel Aviv, Israel. The team finished ninth in the medal table and won a total of 30 medals; 10 gold, 10 silver and 10 bronze.

== Team ==
The Argentine team included Susana Masciotra, who competed in swimming and athletics. She then appear in four more Paralympic Games, with her last being in 1980 where she primarily competed in swimming events. After this, she took another multi-cycle break from the Paralympic Games. She would return for the 2016 Summer Paralympics, where she competed in wheelchair fencing.

Noemi Tortul and Susana Beatriz Olarte returned to represent Argentina again at the Games, after having previously represented the country in 1964. Between them, the women won 9 total medals in Tel Aviv.

== Medals ==
The team finished ninth in the medal table and won a total of 30 medals; 10 gold, 10 silver and 10 bronze.

== Athletics ==
Susana Masciotra competed in athletics. She came away with a gold medal in the women's slalom cervical class event.

== Swimming ==
Susana Masciotra competed in swimming.

== Wheelchair basketball ==
Susana Masciotra competed in wheelchair basketball. Her team won a silver medal in the women's event debut at the Paralympic Games.

== See also ==
- Argentina at the 1968 Summer Olympics
