= Finland at the Paralympics =

- IPC code: FIN
- NPC: Finnish Paralympic Committee
- Website: www.paralympia.fi
- Medals: Gold 155 Silver 151 Bronze 170 Total 476

Summer appearances
- 1960; 1964; 1968; 1972; 1976; 1980; 1984; 1988; 1992; 1996; 2000; 2004; 2008; 2012; 2016; 2020; 2024

Winter appearances
- 1976; 1980; 1984; 1988; 1992; 1994; 1998; 2002; 2006; 2010; 2014; 2018; 2022; 2026

Finland participated in the inaugural Paralympic Games in 1960 in Rome, with a single representative, swimmer Tauno Valkama - who won gold in his sole event, the 50m crawl. The country was absent from the 1964 Games, but returned in 1968, and has participated in every subsequent edition of the Summer Paralympics. Finland has also taken part in every edition of the Winter Paralympics, from the first in 1976.

Finland's 'awakening' to the Paralympics came in 1976, both at the inaugural Winter Games (where it finished third on the medal chart), and at the Summer Games, where it won fifty medals - forty-seven more than it had at the previous summer edition. The country performed strongly throughout the 1980s, then began to decline, in terms of both medal hauls and ranking. In 2004, Finns won only eight medals - the first time since 1972 that they had won fewer than ten. At the Winter Games, Finland was initially a major power, ranking in the top 3 until 1988, and in the top 10 until 2002, despite a gradual yet steady decline. At the 2006 Winter Games, Finland failed to win a single medal; the country won only a silver and a bronze in 2010.

== Medals ==
=== Summer Paralympics ===
Event	Gold	Silver	Bronze	Total	Ranking
1960 Summer Paralympics	1	0	0	1	15th
1964 Summer Paralympics	did not participate				
1968 Summer Paralympics	0	0	0	0	-
1972 Summer Paralympics	0	2	1	3	28th
1976 Summer Paralympics	12	20	18	50	13th
1980 Summer Paralympics	8	19	13	40	17th
1984 Summer Paralympics	19	13	27	59	15th
1988 Summer Paralympics	11	23	16	50	22nd
1992 Summer Paralympics	8	6	12	26	20th
1996 Summer Paralympics	4	5	4	13	30th
2000 Summer Paralympics	1	3	6	10	43rd
2004 Summer Paralympics	4	1	3	8	33rd
2008 Summer Paralympics	2	2	2	6	40th
2012 Summer Paralympics	4	1	1	6	27th
2016 Summer Paralympics	1	1	1	3	56th
2020 Summer Paralympics	1	3	1	5	52nd
2024 Summer Paralympics	0	1	3	4	71st
Total	76	100	108	283	21

=== Winter Paralympics ===
Event	Gold	Silver	Bronze	Total	Ranking
1976 Winter Paralympics	8	7	7	22	3rd
1980 Winter Paralympics	16	7	12	35	2nd
1984 Winter Paralympics	19	9	6	34	2nd
1988 Winter Paralympics	9	8	8	25	4th
1992 Winter Paralympics	7	3	4	14	5th
1994 Winter Paralympics	6	7	12	25	7th
1998 Winter Paralympics	7	5	7	19	9th
2002 Winter Paralympics	4	1	3	8	9th
2006 Winter Paralympics	0	0	0	0	-
2010 Winter Paralympics	0	1	1	2	17th
2014 Winter Paralympics	0	1	0	1	16th
2018 Winter Paralympics	1	0	2	3	16th
2022 Winter Paralympics	2	2	0	4	13th
2026 Winter Paralympics	0	2	0	2	20th
Total	79	53	62	194	6

== Multi-medalists ==
Finnish athletes who have won at least three gold medals or five or more medals of any colour.

No.	Athlete	Sport	Years	Games	Gender	Gold	Silver	Bronze	Total
1	Jouko Grip	Athletics; Cross-country skiing	1980-2002	9	M	12	5	0	17
2	Tanja Kari	Athletics; Cross-country skiing	1988-1994	4	F	6	2	0	8
3	Leo-Pekka Tahti	Athletics	2004-2024	6	M	5	1	2	8
4	Lahja Hamalainen	Ice sledge speed racing	1980-1984	2	F	4	0	3	7
5	Matti Launonen	Athletics; Swimming; Table tennis	1972-2004	8	M	2	7	4	13
6	Toni Piispanen	Athletics	2012, 2020-2024	3	M	2	2	1	5

== See also ==
- Finland at the Olympics
