= Argentina at the 1964 Summer Paralympics =

- IPC code: ARG
- NPC: Argentine Paralympic Committee
- Website: www.coparg.org.ar

in Tokyo
- Competitors: 24 in 3 sports
- Medals Ranked 8th: Gold 6 Silver 15 Bronze 16 Total 37

Summer Paralympics appearances (overview)
- 1960; 1964; 1968; 1972; 1976; 1980; 1984; 1988; 1992; 1996; 2000; 2004; 2008; 2012; 2016; 2020; 2024

Argentina was one of the nineteen nations that competed at the Summer Paralympic Games in 1964 held in Tokyo, Japan from November 3 to 12, 1964. The team finished eighth in the medal table with a total of thirty seven medals, six gold, fourteen silver and sixteen bronze. The Argentinian team consisted of twenty four athletes, eighteen male and six female.

== Team ==
The Argentinian team consisted of twenty four athletes, eighteen male and six female. (Note: Data is taken from the International Paralympic Committee website and is based on information contained/sourced in the original hardcopy final results publications. Some information from earlier Paralympic Games (ie 1960 - 1984) is incomplete and is missing first names of some athletes. Additionally some athletes whose gender could not be clearly identified from the source information are registered as 'x' based on their participation in mixed events. The IPC data doesn`t include the five of the Argentina basquetball players: Eduardo Albelo, Wilmer González, Juan Grusovin, Federico Marín and Rodolfo Novoa. "Historia de las Medallas Paraolímpicas Argentinas". Periodismo Deportivo. 25 Sep 2008.) The team included Noemi Tortul and Susana Beatriz Olarte. In 2014, the pair would become one of the first two Argentine para-athletes to be recognized by the Congress of Sport and Tourism in Rosario, Argentina.

== Medals ==
The Argentinian team consisted of twenty four athletes, eighteen male and six female. (Note: Data is taken from the International Paralympic Committee website and is based on information contained/sourced in the original hardcopy final results publications. Some information from earlier Paralympic Games (ie 1960 - 1984) is incomplete and is missing first names of some athletes. Additionally some athletes whose gender could not be clearly identified from the source information are registered as 'x' based on their participation in mixed events. The IPC data doesn`t include the five of the Argentina basquetball players: Eduardo Albelo, Wilmer González, Juan Grusovin, Federico Marín and Rodolfo Novoa. "Historia de las Medallas Paraolímpicas Argentinas". Periodismo Deportivo. 25 Sep 2008.)

== Track and field (athletics) ==
Argentina entered nine of its twenty four athletes in the athletic events, four male and five female. They won fifteen medals, one gold, six silver and eight bronze. Six individual competitors won a medal, with Olarte and Diz winning four medals each.

Noemi Tortul won a pair of bronze medals at these Games in the shot put and javelin. Susana Beatriz Olarte won four medals, including a gold in the shot put, silver in javelin and discus, and bronze in the speed race.

== Swimming ==
Argentina entered eight of its nineteen athletes in the swimming events, five male and three female. They won sixteen medals, four gold, six silver and six bronze. All eight individual competitors won a medal, with Cochetti, Faloco and Mier winning three medals each.

== Table tennis ==
Argentina entered three of its nineteen athletes in the table-tennis event, all male. They won 2 medals, all silver. Each competitor won one medal.

== Weightlifting ==
Argentina entered three of its nineteen athletes in the weightlifting event, all male. They won two medals, one gold and one bronze. Bartelli and Brandoni won one medal each.

== Wheelchair basketball ==
Argentina entered eleven of its twenty four athletes in the wheelchair basketball event, all male. They won one silver medal at the Men's Tournament B incomplete. The team players were: Eduardo Albelo, Héctor Brandoni, Fernando Bustelli, Jorge Diz, Wilmer González, Juan Grusovin, Roberto Iglesias, Federico Marín, Rodolfo Novoa, Juan Sznitowski y Dante Tosi.
