= Argentina at the 1960 Summer Paralympics =

- IPC code: ARG
- NPC: Argentine Paralympic Committee
- Website: www.coparg.org.ar

in Rome
- Competitors: 5 in 1 sport
- Medals Ranked 10th: Gold 2 Silver 3 Bronze 1 Total 6

Summer Paralympics appearances (overview)
- 1960; 1964; 1968; 1972; 1976; 1980; 1984; 1988; 1992; 1996; 2000; 2004; 2008; 2012; 2016; 2020; 2024

Argentina was one of the seventeen nations that competed at the inaugural Summer Paralympic Games in 1960 held in Rome, Italy, from September 19 to 24, 1960. Preparations for the Games began two years prior in 1958 to stage what was at the time called the 9th Annual International Stoke Mandeville Games. The team finished tenth in the medal table with a total of six medals, two gold, three silver and one bronze. The Argentinian team consisted of five athletes, one man and four women. (Note: Data is taken from the International Paralympic Committee website and is based on information contained/sourced in the original hardcopy final results publications. Some information from earlier Paralympic Games (ie 1960 - 1984) is incomplete and is missing first names of some athletes. Additionally some athletes whose gender could not be clearly identified from the source information are registered as 'x' based on their participation in mixed events.)

== Disability classifications ==
Athletes at the first Paralympics in 1960 were all afflicted by spinal cord injuries and required the use of a wheelchair. This is in contrast to later Paralympics that include events for participants that fit into any of five different disability categories; amputation, either congenital or sustained through injury or illness; cerebral palsy; wheelchair athletes; visual impairment, including blindness; Les autres, any physical disability that does not fall strictly under one of the other categories, for example dwarfism or multiple sclerosis. Each Paralympic sport then has its own classifications, dependent upon the specific physical demands of competition. Events are given a code, made of numbers and letters, describing the type of event and classification of the athletes competing.

== Medalists ==
Medal	Name	Sport	Event
Gold	Perazzo	Swimming	50 m crawl incomplete class 3
Gold	Juan Sznitowski	Swimming	50 m backstroke complete class 5
Silver	Mier	Swimming	50 m complete class 5
Silver	Juan Sznitowski	Swimming	50 m crawl complete class 5
Bronze	Galan	Swimming	50 m crawl incomplete class 4

== Swimming ==
All five of Argentina's athletes in Rome took part in swimming events. Each won at least one medal as none of their events contained more than three competitors. The most successful of the five was Sznitowski who won two medals; he won the gold medal in the men's 50 metres backstroke complete class 5 and the silver medal in the 50 metres crawl complete class 5. Argentina's other gold medal was won by Perazzo in the women's 50 metres crawl incomplete class 3. The only swimmer in the event, she finished in a time of 1 minute 15.3 seconds to claim the medal. Further medals were won by Djukich, silver in the women's 50 metres backstroke incomplete class 4, Galan, a bronze in the women's 50 metres crawl incomplete class 4 and Mier who took silver in the women's 50 metres crawl complete class 5.

== See also ==
- Argentina at the 1960 Summer Olympics
