= Netherlands at the 1960 Summer Paralympics =

- Flag of the Netherlands
- IPC code: NED (PBA used at these Games)
- NPC: Nederlands Olympisch Comité * Nederlandse Sport Federatie
- Website: paralympisch.nl (in Dutch)

in Rome
- Competitors: 18
- Medals Ranked 8th: Gold 3 Silver 6 Bronze 0 Total 9

Summer Paralympics appearances (overview)
- 1960; 1964; 1968; 1972; 1976; 1980; 1984; 1988; 1992; 1996; 2000; 2004; 2008; 2012; 2016; 2020; 2024

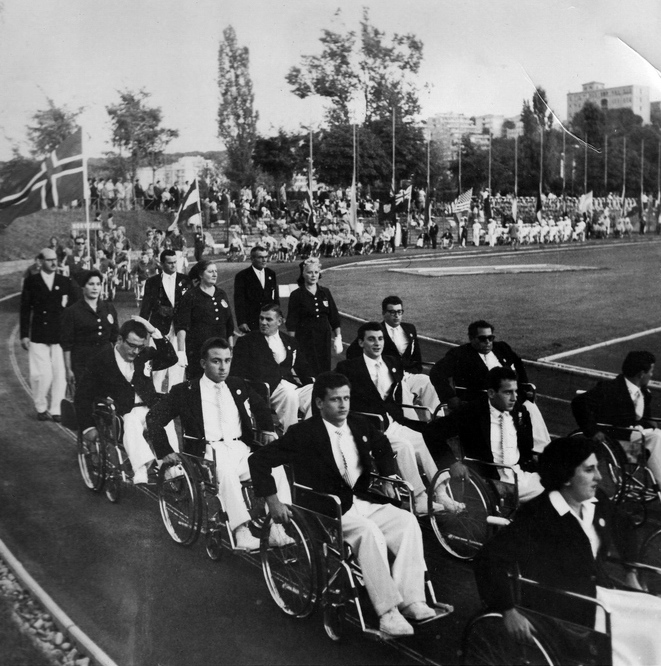
Netherlands at Rome 1960

Netherlands competed at the 1960 Summer Paralympics in Rome, Italy. The team included 18 athletes. Competitors from Netherlands won 9 medals, including 3 gold and 6 silver to finish 8th in the medal table.

== Medalists ==
Medal	Name	Sport	Event
Gold	Delphine Ariens Kappers	Swimming	Women's 25 m Backstroke incomplete class 1
Gold	Delphine Ariens Kappers	Swimming	Women's 25 m Breaststroke complete class 1
Gold	Delphine Ariens Kappers	Swimming	Women's 25 m Crawl complete class 1
Silver	Dik Kruidenier	Athletics	Men's Club Throw C
Silver	Dik Kruidenier	Athletics	Men's Pentathlon open
Silver	Netherlands swimming team names missing	Swimming	Men's 3x50 m Medley Relay open
Silver	Elka Gaarlandt	Swimming	Women's 50 m Breaststroke complete class 3
Silver	Gerard Jacobs; Piet van Aart	Table tennis	Men's Doubles A
Silver	Netherlands men's wheelchair basketball team Dik Kruidenier; T. Hogewoning; Meinema; Simons; Van Ommen	Wheelchair basketball	Men's class B

Source: www.paralympic.org & www.olympischstadion.nl

== See also ==
- Netherlands at the Paralympics
- Netherlands at the 1960 Summer Olympics
