= Swimming at the 1960 Summer Paralympics =

Swimming at the I Paralympic Games
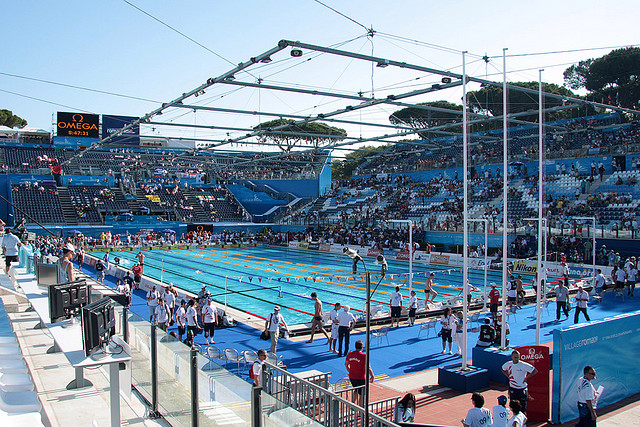

Swimming at the 1960 Summer Paralympics consisted of 62 events, 32 for men and 30 for women.

Each race had no more than three competitors so every swimmer completing a race was guaranteed a medal. All the swimmers successfully completed their races, and every swimmer at the Games therefore earned a medal.

== Medal summary ==
=== Medal table ===
Rank	Nation	Gold	Silver	Bronze	Total
1	Italy (ITA)	15	9	8	32
2	Great Britain (GBR)	15	8	5	28
3	Norway (NOR)	9	3	3	15
4	West Germany (FRG)	9	3	2	14
5	Austria (AUT)	8	5	5	18
6	United States (USA)	3	6	5	14
7	Netherlands (NED)	3	2	0	5
8	Argentina (ARG)	2	3	1	6
9	Australia (AUS)	2	0	0	2
10	Switzerland (SUI)	1	1	0	2
11	Finland (FIN)	1	0	0	1
11	Ireland (IRL)	1	0	0	1
13	Rhodesia (RHO)	0	1	2	3
14	Israel (ISR)	0	1	1	2
Totals (14 entries)		69	42	32	143

=== Participating nations ===
- Argentina (5)
- Australia (1)
- Austria (8)
- Finland (1)
- France (1)
- Great Britain (14)
- Ireland (1)
- Israel (2)
- Italy (16)
- Netherlands (2)
- Norway (10)
- Rhodesia (1)
- Switzerland (2)
- West Germany (7)
- United States (6)

=== Men's events ===
Event	Gold	Silver	Bronze
25 m crawl juniors incomplete class 2	Bernard Jarrige; France	None	None
25 m crawl juniors incomplete class 4	Ersud; Norway	None	None
25 m crawl complete class 1	Heinz Schneider; Austria	Stanley Miles; Great Britain	None
25 m crawl complete class 2	Carlo Jannucci; Italy	Fontana; Italy	Vincent Ward; United States
25 m crawl incomplete class 1	Leo Halford; Great Britain	Girardi; Italy	None
25 m crawl incomplete class 2	Renzo Rogo; Italy	Grimaldi; Italy	Ottavio Moscone; Italy
50 m crawl complete class 3	Harald Gunnerup; Norway	Eskild Hansen; Norway	Robert C. Hawkes; United States
50 m crawl complete class 4	Tauno Valkama; Finland	Richard Maduro; United States	Philip Hall; United States
50 m crawl complete class 5	Denis Favre; Switzerland	Juan Sznitowski; Argentina	Franco Rossi; Italy
50 m crawl incomplete class 3	Johann Igel; Austria	Godfrey Williams; Great Britain	Sodenkamp; West Germany
50 m crawl incomplete class 4	Enzo Santini; Italy	Paul Sones; United States	Friedrich Sintermann; West Germany
25 m backstroke juniors incomplete class 2	Kalberg; Norway	Bernard Jarrige; France	None
25 m backstroke juniors incomplete class 4	Ersud; Norway	None	None
25 m backstroke complete class 1	Stroebel; West Germany	Stanley Miles; Great Britain	Heinz Schneider; Austria
25 m backstroke complete class 2	Fred Crowder; Great Britain	Carlo Jannucci; Italy	Vincent Ward; United States
25 m backstroke incomplete class 1	Leo Halford; Great Britain	Wetzel; West Germany	Pasquarelli; Italy
25 m backstroke incomplete class 2	Ottavio Moscone; Italy	Leo Halford; Great Britain	Einar Nilsen; Norway
50 m backstroke complete class 3	Bill Johnson; United States	Robert C. Hawkes; United States	Aroldo Ruschioni; Italy
50 m backstroke complete class 4	Richard Maduro; United States	Peter Stanton; Great Britain	Israel Globus; Israel
50 m backstroke complete class 5	Juan Sznitowski; Argentina	Pasquale Carfagna; Italy	None
50 m backstroke incomplete class 3	Sodenkamp; West Germany	Johann Igel; Austria	None
50 m backstroke incomplete class 4	Enzo Santini; Italy	Paul Sones; United States	Arthur Brindle; Great Britain
25 m breaststroke complete class 1	Stroebel; West Germany	Heinz Schneider; Austria	Stanley Miles; Great Britain
25 m breaststroke complete class 2	Carlo Jannucci; Italy	Vincent Ward; United States	Fontana; Italy
25 m breaststroke incomplete class 1 and 2	Wetzel; West Germany	Leo Halford; Great Britain	None
25 m breaststroke incomplete class 2	Renzo Rogo; Italy	Grimaldi; Italy	Ottavio Moscone; Italy
50 m breaststroke complete class 3	Robert C. Hawkes; United States	Bill Johnson; United States	Cipriano Gasperini; Italy
50 m breaststroke complete class 4	Eivind Brager; Norway	Elvio Di Pasquo; Italy	Walter Telsnig; Austria
50 m breaststroke complete class 5	Franco Rossi; Italy	None	None
50 m breaststroke incomplete class 3	Sodenkamp; West Germany	Kadau; West Germany	Johann Igel; Austria
50 m breaststroke incomplete class 4	Harald Gunnerup; Norway	Leira; Norway	Paul Sones; United States
3×50 m medley relay open	West Germany (FRG)	Netherlands (NED)	Norway (NOR)

=== Women's events ===
Event	Gold	Silver	Bronze
25 m crawl juniors incomplete class 4	Vagrum; Norway	None	None
25 m crawl complete class 1	Delphine Ariens Kappers; Netherlands	None	None
25 m crawl complete class 2	Joan Horan; Ireland	Rosa Kuhnel; Austria	None
25 m crawl incomplete class 1	Barbara Anderson; Great Britain	None	None
25 m crawl incomplete class 2	Anna Maria Toso; Italy	None	None
50 m crawl complete class 3	Manette Berger-Waldenegg; Austria	Ilse Driessler; Austria	None
50 m crawl complete class 4	Pauline Foulds; Great Britain	None	None
50 m crawl complete class 5	Daphne Ceeney; Australia	Amelia Mier; Argentina	None
50 m crawl incomplete class 3	Beatriz Perazzo; Argentina	None	None
50 m crawl incomplete class 4	Christa Zander; West Germany	Margaret Harriman; Rhodesia	Beatriz Galán; Argentina
25 m backstroke juniors incomplete class 4	Birgith Reklev; Norway	Myrheim; Norway	Vagrum; Norway
25 m backstroke complete class 1	Barbara Anderson; Great Britain	None	None
25 m backstroke complete class 2	Rosa Kuhnel; Austria	Susan Masham; Great Britain	None
25 m backstroke incomplete class 1	Delphine Ariens Kappers; Netherlands	None	None
25 m backstroke incomplete class 2	Masson; Great Britain	Anna Maria Toso; Italy	Mazzoni; Italy
50 m backstroke complete class 3	Manette Berger-Waldenegg; Austria	Ilse Driessler; Austria	Janet Laughton; Great Britain
50 m backstroke complete class 4	Pauline Foulds; Great Britain	Maria Scutti; Italy	Frieda Dorfel; Austria
50 m backstroke complete class 5	Margaret Maughan; Great Britain	None	None
50 m backstroke incomplete class 3	Ilse Scharf; Austria	Marlene Muhlendyck; West Germany	Phyllis Waller; Great Britain
50 m backstroke incomplete class 4	Christa Zander; West Germany	María Djukich; Argentina	Margaret Harriman; Rhodesia
25 m breaststroke juniors incomplete class 4	Birgith Reklev; Norway	None	None
25 m breaststroke complete class 1	Delphine Ariens Kappers; Netherlands	Mati Angel; Israel	None
25 m breaststroke complete class 2	Susan Masham; Great Britain	Simone Knusli; Switzerland	Rosa Kuhnel; Austria
25 m breaststroke incomplete class 1	Barbara Anderson; Great Britain	None	None
25 m breaststroke incomplete class 2	Anna Maria Toso; Italy	None	None
50 m breaststroke complete class 3	Manette Berger-Waldenegg; Austria	Elka Gaarlandt; Netherlands	Janet Laughton; Great Britain
50 m breaststroke complete class 4	Maria Scutti; Italy	None	None
50 m breaststroke complete class 5	Daphne Ceeney; Australia	None	None
50 m breaststroke incomplete class 3	Ilse Scharf; Austria	None	None
50 m breaststroke incomplete class 4	Christa Zander; West Germany	Edwards; Great Britain	Margaret Harriman; Rhodesia
