= Great Britain at the 1960 Summer Paralympics =

- Flag of the United Kingdom
- IPC code: GBR (GRB used at these Games)
- NPC: British Paralympic Association
- Website: www.paralympics.org.uk

in Rome
- Competitors: 31 in 6 sports
- Medals Ranked 2nd: Gold 20 Silver 15 Bronze 20 Total 55

Summer Paralympics appearances (overview)
- 1960; 1964; 1968; 1972; 1976; 1980; 1984; 1988; 1992; 1996; 2000; 2004; 2008; 2012; 2016; 2020; 2024

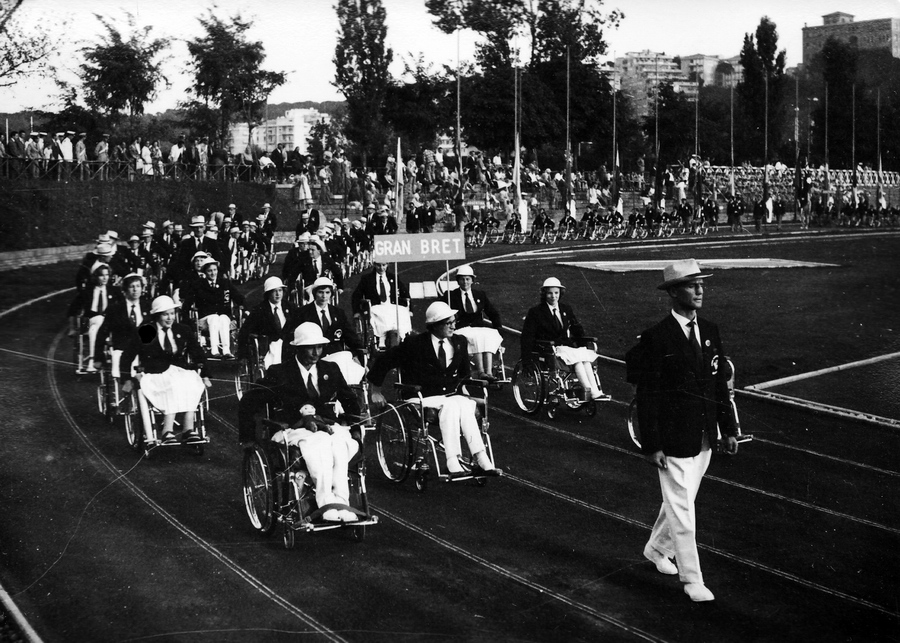
Great Britain at Rome 1960

The United Kingdom of Great Britain and Northern Ireland, competing as Great Britain, participated in the inaugural Paralympic Games in 1960 in Rome. The 1960 Paralympics, now considered to have been the first Paralympic Games, were initially known as the ninth Stoke Mandeville Games, Games for athletes with disabilities founded in Great Britain in 1948.

Great Britain fielded the second largest delegation at the 1960 Games (after Italy's), with 31 competitors (18 men and 13 women) in archery, athletics, snooker, swimming, table tennis and wheelchair basketball. It also fielded by far the greatest number of female athletes (13), whereas all other countries fielded four or less (with the exception of Austria, which sent seven). All British competitors won medals in every event they entered, putting Great Britain second on the medal table with 20 gold, 15 silver and 20 bronze. Britain's first ever Paralympic gold medal was won by Margaret Maughan, in archery.

== Medalists ==
Medal	Name	Sport	Event
Gold	Margaret Maughan	Archery	Women's Columbia round open
Gold	Dick Thompson	Athletics	Men's club throw A
Gold	Dick Thompson	Athletics	Men's javelin throw A
Gold	Dick Thompson	Athletics	Men's javelin throw B
Gold	Dick Thompson	Athletics	Men's precision javelin throw A
Gold	Cliff Keaton	Snooker	Men's paraplegics open
Gold	Leo Halford	Swimming	Men's 25m crawl incomplete class 1
Gold	Fred Crowder	Swimming	Men's 25m backstroke complete class 2
Gold	Leo Halford	Swimming	Men's 25m backstroke incomplete class 1
Gold	Barbara Anderson	Swimming	Women's 25m crawl incomplete class 1
Gold	Pauline Foulds	Swimming	Women's 50m crawl complete class 4
Gold	Barbara Anderson	Swimming	Women's 25m backstroke complete class 1
Gold	Masson	Swimming	Women's 25m backstroke incomplete class 2
Gold	Pauline Foulds	Swimming	Women's 50m backstroke complete class 4
Gold	Margaret Maughan	Swimming	Women's 50m backstroke complete class 5
Gold	Susan Masham	Swimming	Women's 25m breaststroke complete class 2
Gold	Barbara Anderson	Swimming	Women's 25m breaststroke incomplete class 1
Gold	Tommy Taylor	Table tennis	Men's singles A
Gold	M. Beck; Tommy Taylor	Table tennis	Men's doubles A
Gold	Barbara Anderson	Table tennis	Women's singles A
Silver	Cliff Bradley	Archery	Men's FITA round open
Silver	Cliff Bradley	Archery	Men's Windsor round open
Silver	Kathleen Comley	Archery	Women's FITA round open
Silver	Robin Irvine	Archery	Women's Windsor round open
Silver	Michael Shelton	Snooker	Men's paraplegics open
Silver	Stanley Miles	Swimming	Men's 25m crawl complete class 1
Silver	Godfrey Williams	Swimming	Men's 50m crawl incomplete class 3
Silver	Stanley Miles	Swimming	Men's 25m backstroke complete class 1
Silver	Leo Halford	Swimming	Men's 25m backstroke incomplete class 2
Silver	Peter Stanton	Swimming	Men's 50m backstroke complete class 4
Silver	Leo Halford	Swimming	Men's 25m breaststroke incomplete class 1 and 2
Silver	Susan Masham	Swimming	Women's 25m backstroke complete class 2
Silver	Edwards	Swimming	Women's 50m breaststroke incomplete class 4
Silver	Edwards; Gubbin	Table tennis	Women's doubles C
Silver	Men's team class A names:	Wheelchair basketball	Men's class A tournament
Bronze	Carl Hepple	Archery	Men's Columbia round open
Bronze	Tony Potter	Archery	Men's FITA round open
Bronze	Diana Gubbin	Archery	Women's Columbia round open
Bronze	Robin Irvine	Archery	Women's FITA round open
Bronze	Kathleen Comley	Archery	Women's Windsor round open
Bronze	Russ Scott	Athletics	Men's club throw C
Bronze	Carl Hepple	Athletics	Men's javelin throw C
Bronze	Dick Thompson	Athletics	Men's shot put A
Bronze	Russ Scott	Athletics	Men's pentathlon open
Bronze	Arthur Brindle	Swimming	Men's 50m backstroke incomplete class 4
Bronze	Stanley Miles	Swimming	Men's 25m breaststroke complete class 1
Bronze	Janet Laughton	Swimming	Women's 50m backstroke complete class 3
Bronze	Janet Laughton	Swimming	Women's 50m breaststroke complete class 3
Bronze	Waller	Swimming	Women's 50m backstroke incomplete class 3
Bronze	M. Beck	Table tennis	Men's singles A
Bronze	Ronnie Foster	Table tennis	Men's doubles B
Bronze	Philips; George Swindlehurst	Table tennis	Men's doubles C
Bronze	Gubbin	Table tennis	Women's singles C
Bronze	Froggart; Susan Masham	Table tennis	Women's doubles B
Bronze	Men's team class B	Wheelchair basketball	Men's class B

=== Medals by sport ===
Medals by sport
Sport	Gold medal	Silver medal	Bronze medal	Total
Swimming	11	8	5	24
Athletics	4	0	4	8
Table Tennis	3	1	5	9
Archery	1	4	5	10
Snooker	1	1	0	2
Wheelchair Basketball	0	1	1	2
Total	20	15	20	55

== See also ==
- Great Britain at the 1960 Summer Olympics
