= Norway at the 1960 Summer Paralympics =

- IPC code: NOR
- NPC: Norwegian Olympic and Paralympic Committee and Confederation of Sports
- Website: www.idrett.no (in Norwegian)

in Rome
- Medals Ranked 6th: Gold 9 Silver 3 Bronze 4 Total 16

Summer Paralympics appearances (overview)
- 1960; 1964; 1968; 1972; 1976; 1980; 1984; 1988; 1992; 1996; 2000; 2004; 2008; 2012; 2016; 2020; 2024

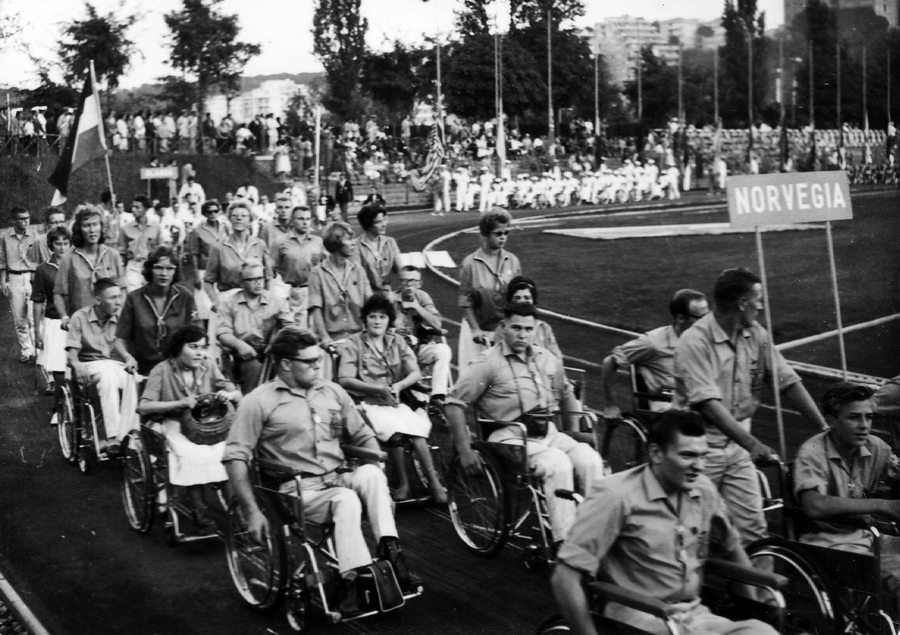
Norway at Rome 1960

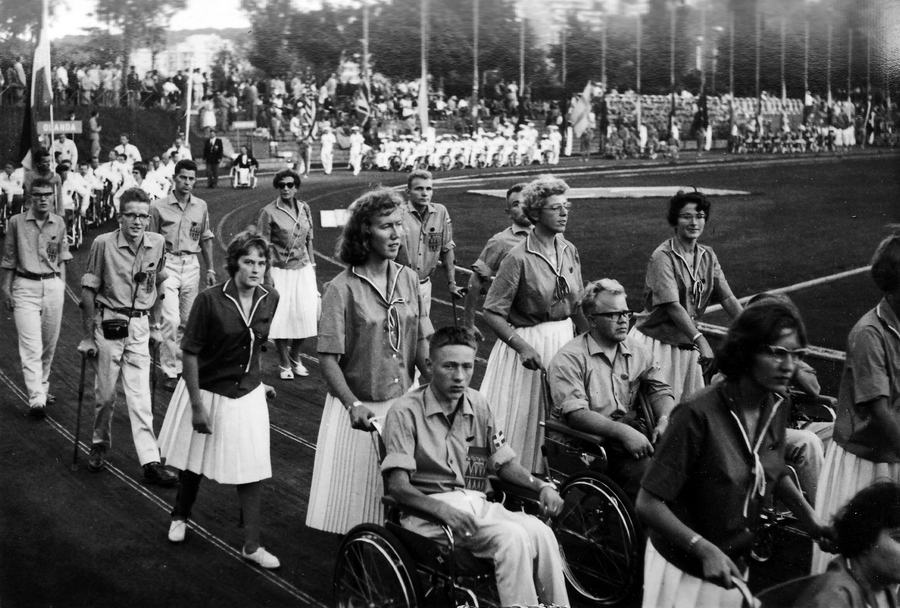

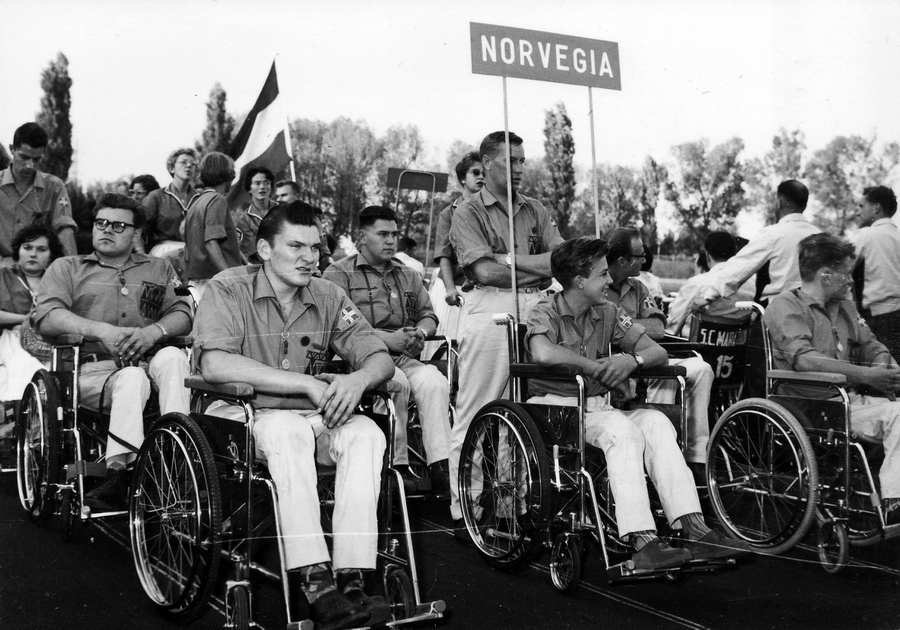

Norway sent a delegation to compete at the 1960 Summer Paralympics in Rome, Italy. Its athletes finished sixth in the overall medal count. Most of their medals were won in swimming.

== Medalists ==
Medal	Name	Sport	Event
Gold	Roar Ersrud	Swimming	Men's 25m crawl juniors incomplete class 4
Gold	Harald Gunnerup	Swimming	Men's 50m crawl complete class 3
Gold	Torbjørn Kalberg	Swimming	Men's 25m backstroke juniors incomplete class 2
Gold	Roar Ersrud	Swimming	Men's 25m backstroke juniors incomplete class 4
Gold	Eivind Brager	Swimming	Men's 50m breaststroke complete class 4
Gold	Harald Gunnerup	Swimming	Men's 50m breaststroke incomplete class 4
Gold	Torill Vagrum	Swimming	Women's 25m crawl juniors incomplete class 4
Gold	Birgith Reklev	Swimming	Women's 25m backstroke juniors incomplete class 4
Gold	Birgith Reklev	Swimming	Women's 25m breaststroke juniors incomplete class 4
Silver	Eskild Hansen	Swimming	Men's 50m crawl complete class 3
Silver	Oddvar Leira	Swimming	Men's 50m breaststroke incomplete class 4
Silver	Hilde Myrheim	Swimming	Women's 25m backstroke juniors incomplete class 4
Bronze	Einar Nilsen	Swimming	Men's 25m backstroke incomplete class 2
Bronze	Men's team Eivind Brager; Harald Gunnerup; Oddvar Leira	Swimming	Men's 3x50m medley relay open
Bronze	Torill Vagrum	Swimming	Women's 25m juniors incomplete class 4
Bronze	Tora Lysø	Table tennis	Women's singles A

== See also ==
- Norway at the Paralympics
- Norway at the 1960 Summer Olympics
