= Austria at the 1960 Summer Paralympics =

- IPC code: AUT
- NPC: Austrian Paralympic Committee
- Website: www.oepc.at (in German)

in Rome
- Medals Ranked 4th: Gold 11 Silver 8 Bronze 11 Total 30

Summer Paralympics appearances (overview)
- 1960; 1964; 1968; 1972; 1976; 1980; 1984; 1988; 1992; 1996; 2000; 2004; 2008; 2012; 2016; 2020; 2024

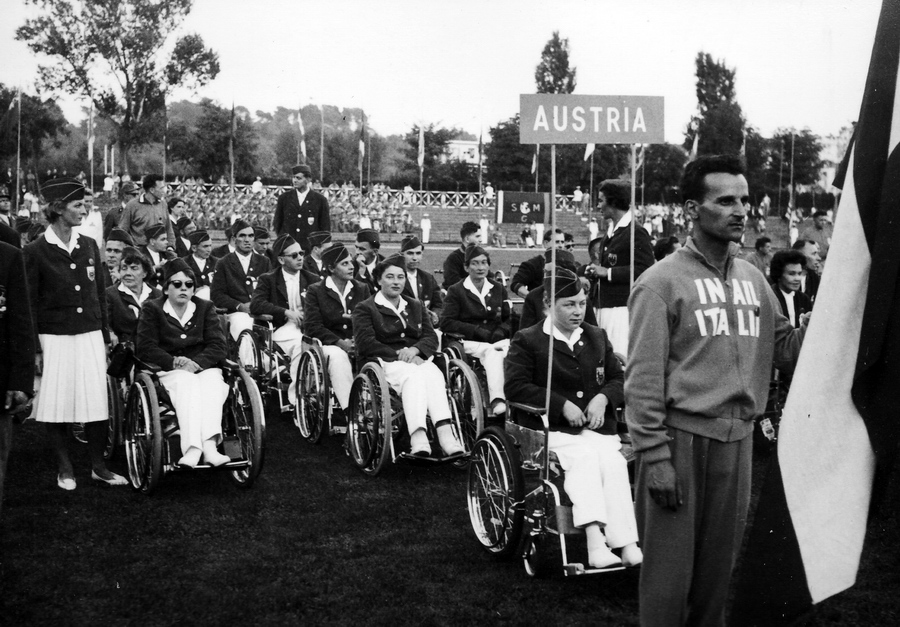
Austria at Rome 1960

Austria sent a delegation to compete at the 1960 Summer Paralympics in Rome, Italy. Its athletes finished fourth in the overall medal count.

== Medalists ==
Medal	Name	Sport	Event
Gold	Manette Berger-Waldenegg	Swimming	50 m crawl complete class 3
Gold	Manette Berger-Waldenegg	Swimming	50 m backstroke complete class 3
Gold	Manette Berger-Waldenegg	Swimming	50 m breaststroke complete class 3
Gold	Johann Igel	Swimming	50 m crawl incomplete class 3
Gold	R. Kuhnel	Swimming	25 m backstroke complete class 2
Gold	Scharf	Swimming	50 m backstroke incomplete class 3
Gold	Scharf	Swimming	50 m breaststroke incomplete class 3
Gold	Schneider	Swimming	25 m crawl complete class 1
Gold	Engelbert Rangger	Table tennis	Singles B
Gold	Manette Berger-Waldenegg; R. Kuhnel	Table tennis	Doubles B
Gold	Manette Berger-Waldenegg; Scharf	Table tennis	Doubles C
Silver	Walter Telsnig	Athletics	Precision javelin throw C
Silver	I. Driessler	Swimming	50 m crawl complete class 3
Silver	I. Driessler	Swimming	50 m backstroke complete class 3
Silver	Johann Igel	Swimming	50 m backstroke incomplete class 3
Silver	R. Kuhnel	Swimming	25 m crawl complete class 2
Silver	Schneider	Swimming	25 m breaststroke complete class 1
Silver	Manette Berger-Waldenegg	Table tennis	Singles B
Silver	Scharf	Table tennis	Singles C
Bronze	Manette Berger-Waldenegg	Athletics	Club throw A
Bronze	Manette Berger-Waldenegg	Athletics	Javelin throw A
Bronze	I. Driessler	Athletics	Precision javelin throw A
Bronze	Kohlmannhuber	Athletics	Precision javelin throw C
Bronze	Englebert Rangger	Athletics	Precision javelin throw C
Bronze	Dorfel	Swimming	50 m backstroke complete class 4
Bronze	Johann Igel	Swimming	50 m breaststroke incomplete class 3
Bronze	R. Kuhnel	Swimming	25 m breaststroke complete class 2
Bronze	Schneider	Swimming	25 m backstroke complete class 1
Bronze	Walter Telsnig	Swimming	50 m breaststroke complete class 4
Bronze	Paulhart; Schneider	Table tennis	Doubles A

== See also ==
- 1960 Summer Paralympics
- Austria at the 1960 Summer Olympics
