= Heinz Schneider =

German table tennis player

Personal information
- Nationality: Germany
- Born: 12 October 1932 Mulhouse
- Died: 20 August 2007 (aged 74)
Medal record
Representing East Germany
World Table Tennis Championships
Bronze medal – third place	1957	Men's Singles

Heinz Schneider (October 12, 1932 – August 20, 2007) was a male East German international table tennis player.

He won a bronze medal at the 1957 World Table Tennis Championships in the men's singles.

Between 1950 and 1961 Schneider won six East German Championships in singles and six times in doubles. He was the first German to win a medal in table tennis after the Second World War. He played 26 international matches for Germany and more than 100 international matches for the East German team.

== See also ==
- List of table tennis players
- List of World Table Tennis Championships medalists
