= 1960 Summer Paralympics =

Multi-parasport event in Rome, Italy

I Paralympic Games
- Location: Rome, Italy
- Nations: 23
- Athletes: 400
- Events: 114 in 8 sports
- Opening: 18 September 1960
- Closing: 25 September 1960
- Opened by: Camillo Giardina
- Stadium: Aqua Acetosa

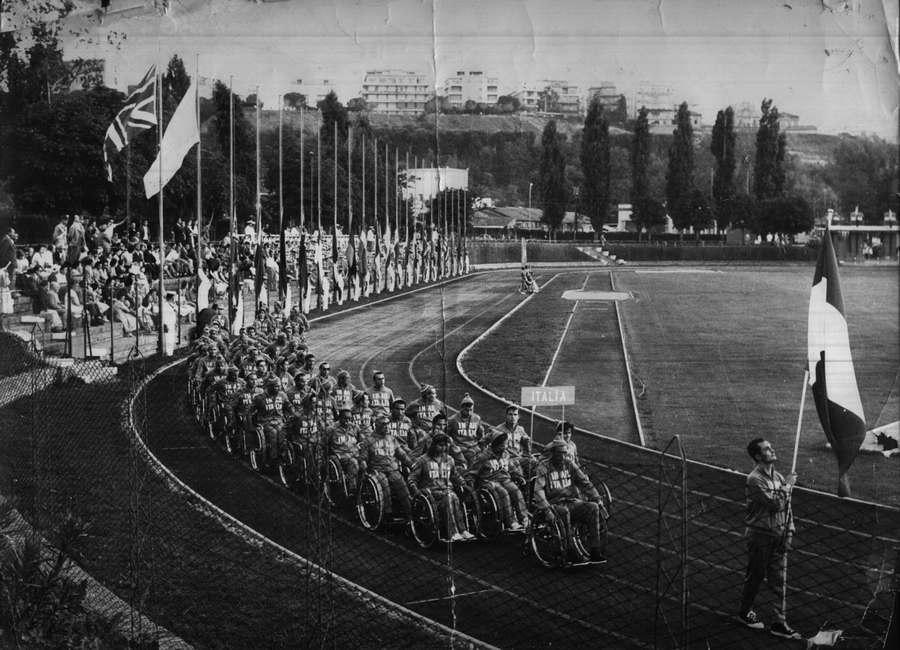
Italian Team at the Opening Ceremony

The 9th Annual International Stoke Mandeville Games, retroactively designated as the 1960 Summer Paralympics, were the first international Paralympic Games, following on from the Stoke Mandeville Games of 1948 and 1952. They were organised under the aegis of the International Stoke Mandeville Games Federation. The term "Paralympic Games" was approved by the International Olympic Committee (IOC) first in 1984, while the International Paralympic Committee (IPC) was formed in 1989.

The Games were held in Rome, Italy from September 18 to 25, 1960, with the 1960 Summer Olympics. The only disability included in these Paralympics was spinal cord injury. There were 400 athletes from 23 countries.

== Organisation ==
Dr. Ludwig Guttmann, the founder of the Stoke Mandeville Games along with Antonio Maglio, head of the Spinal Centre in Rome organised the event which was the first Stoke Mandeville Games to be held outside the UK.

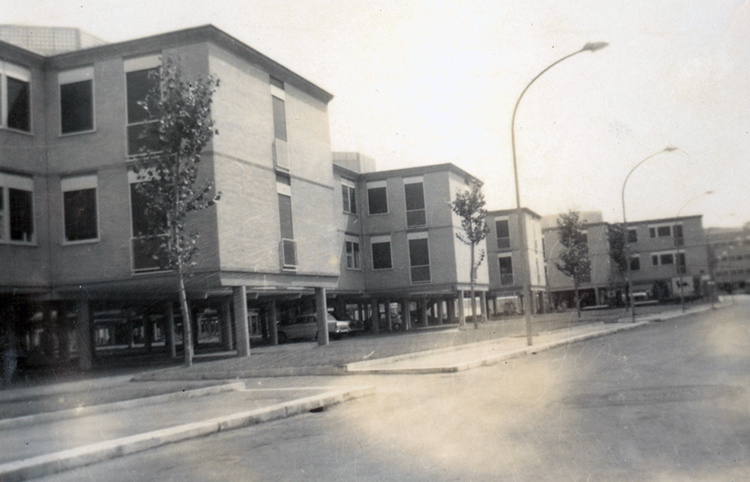
Paralympic Athletes' Village 1960

== Sports ==
- Archery
- Athletics
- Dartchery
- Snooker
- Swimming
- Table tennis
- Wheelchair basketball
- Wheelchair fencing

== Medal table ==
The top 10 NPCs by number of gold medals are listed below. The host nation, Italy, is highlighted.

* Host nation (Italy)

Rank	Nation	Gold	Silver	Bronze	Total
1	Italy*	29	28	23	80
2	Great Britain	20	15	20	55
3	West Germany	15	6	9	30
4	Austria	11	8	11	30
5	United States	11	7	7	25
6	Norway	9	3	4	16
7	Australia	3	6	1	10
8	Netherlands	3	6	0	9
9	France	3	3	1	7
10	Argentina	2	3	1	6
Totals (10 entries)		106	85	77	268

== Participating delegations ==
The number in parentheses indicates the number of participants from each NPC.

- Argentina (16)
- Australia (13)
- Austria (22)
- Belgium (18)
- Canada (1)
- Finland (3)
- France (24)
- Great Britain (51)
- Ireland (5)
- Israel (13)
- Italy (31)
- Lebanon (1)
- Malta (13)
- Netherlands (19)
- Norway (18)
- Rhodesia (2)
- Sweden (5)
- Switzerland (19)
- United States (25)
- West Germany (16)
- Yugoslavia (4)

New sporting event	Summer Paralympics; Rome; I Paralympic Summer Games (1960)	Succeeded by Tokyo
