= Argentine Paralympic Committee =

National Paralympic Committee of Argentina

Argentine Paralympic Committee Comité Paralímpico Argentino
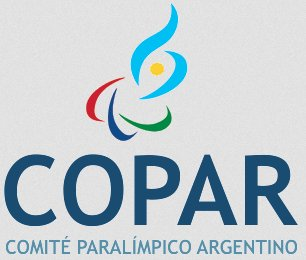

National Paralympic Committee
- Country: Argentina
- Code: ARG
- Created: 2004
- Continental association: APC
- President: Alberto Rodriguez
- Website: www.coparg.org.ar

The Argentine Paralympic Committee (COPAR; Spanish: Comité Paralímpico Argentino – COPAR) is the private, non-profit organization representing Argentine Paralympic athletes in the International Paralympic Committee (IPC), the Parapan American Games and the South American Para Games. It is the governing body of Argentine Paralympic sport.

== See also ==
- Argentina at the Paralympics
- Argentine Olympic Committee
