= Finnish Paralympic Committee =

National Paralympic Committee of Finland

National Paralympic Committee
- Country: Finland
- Code: FIN
- Created: 1994
- Continental association: EPC
- Headquarters: Helsinki, Finland
- President: Sari Rautio
- Secretary General: Antti Heikkinen
- Website: www.paralympia.fi

Finnish Paralympic Committee (Finnish: Suomen Paralympiakomitea) is the National Paralympic Committee in Finland for the Paralympic Games movement. It is a non-profit organisation that selects teams, and raises funds to send Finnish competitors to Paralympic events organised by the International Paralympic Committee (IPC).

The organisation was founded in 1994.

The visual identity was created by British designer Richard Johnson.

== See also ==
- Finland at the Paralympics
- Finnish Olympic Committee
