= Swimming at the 1988 Summer Paralympics =

Swimming at the VIII Paralympic Games
- Paralympic Swimming
- Venue: Jamsil Indoor Swimming Pool
- Dates: 17 to 26 October,1988

Paralympic symbol (1988-1994)

Swimming at the 1988 Summer Paralympics consisted of 257 events.

== Medal table ==
Rank	Nation	Gold	Silver	Bronze	Total
1	United States (USA)	33	28	22	83
2	Sweden (SWE)	31	26	7	64
3	Great Britain (GBR)	24	37	22	83
4	Canada (CAN)	24	10	17	51
5	West Germany (FRG)	20	11	10	41
6	Netherlands (NED)	19	17	18	54
7	France (FRA)	16	21	23	60
8	Poland (POL)	13	20	20	53
9	Denmark (DEN)	12	11	12	35
10	Spain (ESP)	12	10	8	30
11	Israel (ISR)	12	6	12	30
12	China (CHN)	9	7	2	18
13	Norway (NOR)	7	3	4	14
14	Australia (AUS)	5	12	14	31
15	Italy (ITA)	5	5	9	19
16	Belgium (BEL)	4	3	1	8
17	Finland (FIN)	2	4	4	10
18	Ireland (IRL)	2	0	4	6
19	Faroe Islands (FRO)	1	3	3	7
20	Iceland (ISL)	1	2	5	8
21	Brazil (BRA)	1	1	7	9
22	New Zealand (NZL)	1	1	4	6
23	Mexico (MEX)	1	1	1	3
24	South Korea (KOR)	1	0	3	4
25	Japan (JPN)	1	0	2	3
26	Soviet Union (URS)	0	11	9	20
27	Argentina (ARG)	0	3	1	4
28	Hungary (HUN)	0	1	5	6
29	Yugoslavia (YUG)	0	1	2	3
30	Austria (AUT)	0	1	1	2
30	Greece (GRE)	0	1	1	2
32	Egypt (EGY)	0	0	2	2
33	Morocco (MAR)	0	0	1	1
33	Switzerland (SUI)	0	0	1	1
Totals (34 entries)		257	257	257	771

=== Participating nations ===
- Argentina (2)
- Australia (25)
- Austria (3)
- Belgium (2)
- Brazil (9)
- Canada (27)
- China (10)
- Colombia (4)
- Cyprus (1)
- Denmark (48)
- Egypt (46)
- Faroe Islands (4)
- Finland (7)
- France (25)
- Great Britain (42)
- Greece (2)
- Hong Kong (3)
- Hungary (8)
- Iceland (10)
- Indonesia (1)
- Ireland (5)
- Israel (12)
- Italy (20)
- Japan (37)
- Kuwait (3)
- Macau (1)
- Malaysia (2)
- Mexico (1)
- Morocco (3)
- Netherlands (18)
- New Zealand (3)
- Norway (6)
- Philippines (1)
- Poland (17)
- Singapore (2)
- Spain (19)
- South Korea (16)
- Soviet Union (8)
- Sweden (24)
- Switzerland (5)
- Thailand (2)
- United States (73)
- West Germany (14)
- Yugoslavia (2)

== Medal summary ==
=== Men's events ===
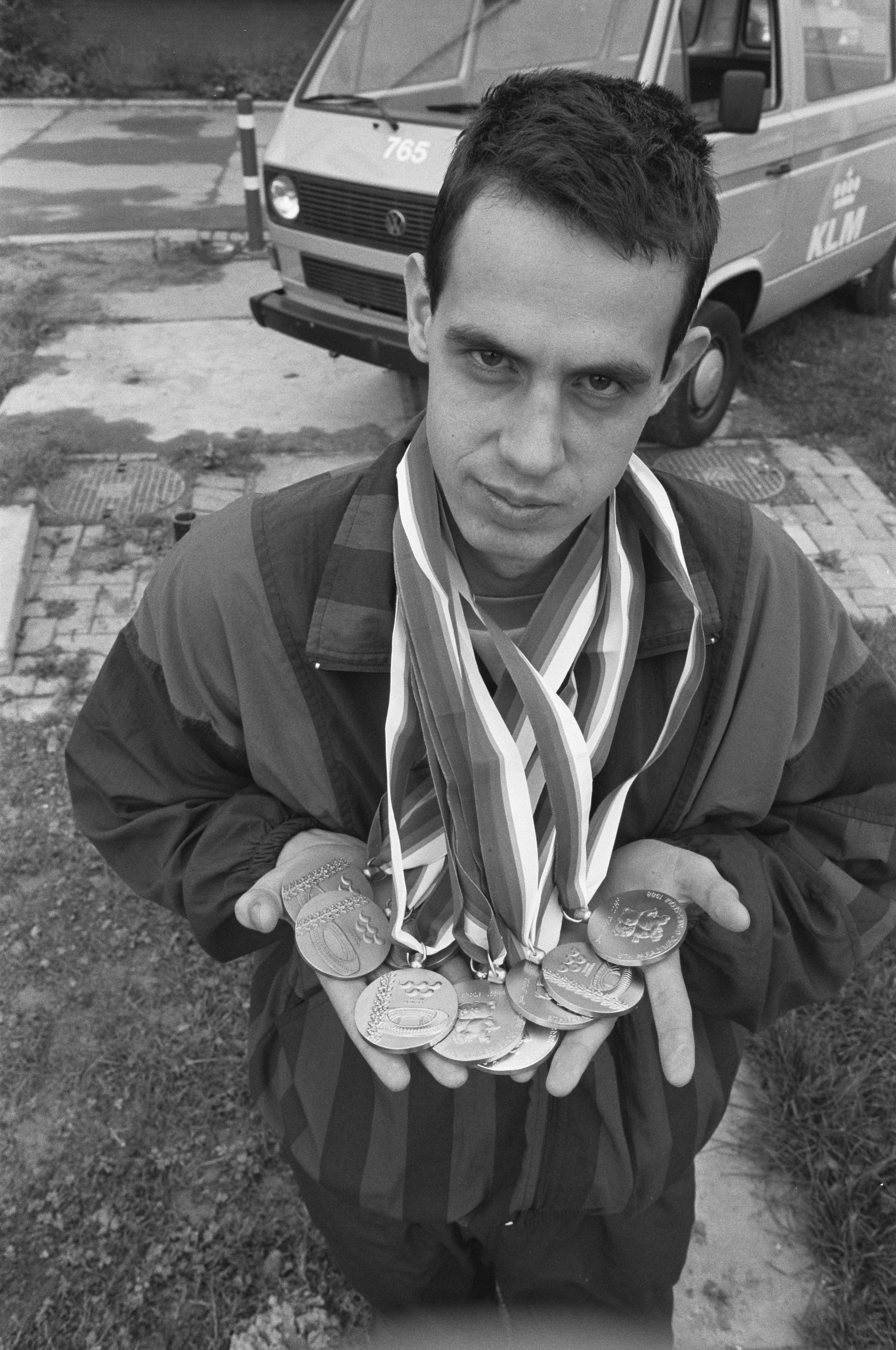
Johan Mosterd

Event	Gold	Silver	Bronze
50 m freestyle 1A	Mike Kenny; Great Britain	Phillip Tracey; Australia	Maurizio Galliano; Italy
50 m freestyle 1B	James Thompson; United States	Gerhard Hausleitner; West Germany	Kyriakos Griveas; Greece
50 m freestyle 1C	Luca Pancalli; Italy	Krzysztof Sleczka; Poland	Rick Ciccotto; United States
50 m freestyle 2	Kevin Sullivan; United States	Tal Golan; Israel	Roby Crichton; New Zealand
50 m freestyle 3	Andrew Blake; Great Britain	Arkadiusz Pawlowski; Poland	Brent Gibson; New Zealand
50 m freestyle B1	Izhar Cohen; Israel	Oleg Cher; Soviet Union	Timothy McIsaac; Canada
50 m freestyle B2	Eric Ghysel; France	Christopher Holmes; Great Britain	Mikhail Kapitonov; Soviet Union
50 m freestyle B3	Michael Edgson; Canada	Ian Sharpe; Great Britain	Flemming Berthelsen; Denmark
50 m freestyle L1	John Petersson; Denmark	Hans Coster; Sweden	Franck Maille; France
100 m freestyle 1A	Mike Kenny; Great Britain	Phillip Tracey; Australia	Maurizio Galliano; Italy
100 m freestyle 1B	James Thompson; United States	Tomasz Dabrowski; Poland	Gerhard Hausleitner; West Germany
100 m freestyle 1C	Luca Pancalli; Italy	Krzysztof Sleczka; Poland	Fábio Ricci; Brazil
100 m freestyle 4	Shlomo Pinto; Israel	Jeffrey van Loon; Netherlands	Pascal Auclair; France
100 m freestyle 5	Piotr Finder; Poland	Bernard Micorec; France	Moisés Galindo; Mexico
100 m freestyle 6	Uri Bergman; Israel	Tomas Hainey; Canada	Gerard Dunne; Ireland
100 m freestyle A1	Oliver Jones; Great Britain	Yan Hu Wu; China	Geza Dukai; Hungary
100 m freestyle A2	Vincent Maassen; Netherlands	Michael Doyle; United States	David Griffin; Australia
100 m freestyle A4	Johan Mosterd; Netherlands	Ron Bolotin; Israel	Michael Boucherie; France
100 m freestyle A5	David Foppolo; France	Eric Richard; France	Stefano Giovannetti; Italy
100 m freestyle A6	Zebing Liu; China	Kim Due Andersen; Denmark	Zbigniew Odachowski; Poland
100 m freestyle A7	Heinz Barnbeck; West Germany	Andrzej Wojciechowski; Poland	Ralph Smith; Australia
100 m freestyle A8	Greg Hammond; Australia	Emmanuel Lacroix; France	Hanoch Budin; Israel
100 m freestyle B1	Izhar Cohen; Israel	Oleg Cher; Soviet Union	Timothy McIsaac; Canada
100 m freestyle B2	Eric Ghysel; France	Wieslaw Krol; Poland	Christopher Holmes; Great Britain
100 m freestyle B3	Michael Edgson; Canada	John Friedrick; United States	Ian Sharpe; Great Britain
100 m freestyle C3	Haakon Henne; Norway	Claude Badie; France	Boaz Avhar; Israel
100 m freestyle C4	Robin Surgeoner; Great Britain	Mats Brisenfelt; Sweden	Martin Parker; United States
100 m freestyle C5	Anders Christensen; Denmark	Kasper Engel; Netherlands	Michael Quickert; West Germany
100 m freestyle C6	Joris van Geel; Netherlands	Paul Hancock; Great Britain	Min Soon Lim; South Korea
100 m freestyle C8	Thomas Klinger; West Germany	Hans Pauwels; Belgium	Patrick Buygel; Netherlands
100 m freestyle L1	John Petersson; Denmark	Hans Coster; Sweden	Franck Maille; France
100 m freestyle L3	Jorgen Magner; Sweden	Danijel Pavlinec; Yugoslavia	Marco Elout; Netherlands
100 m freestyle L4	Marcel Poulisse; Netherlands	Erling Trondsen; Norway	Andrew Gilbert; Great Britain
100 m freestyle L5	Holger Woelk; West Germany	Paul Noble; Great Britain	Pil Sung Yong; South Korea
100 m freestyle L6	Mats Einarsson; Sweden	Gianluca Saini; Italy	Jochen Hahnengress; West Germany
200 m freestyle 2	Marek Szpojnarowicz; Poland	Roby Crichton; New Zealand	Ernesto Giussani; Italy
200 m freestyle 3	Brent Gibson; New Zealand	Miroslaw Owczarek; Poland	Arkadiusz Pawlowski; Poland
200 m freestyle C4	Robin Surgeoner; Great Britain	Mats Brisenfelt; Sweden	Martin Parker; United States
200 m freestyle C5	Anders Christensen; Denmark	Martin Mansell; Great Britain	Michael Quickert; West Germany
200 m freestyle C8	Hans Pauwels; Belgium	Thomas Klinger; West Germany	Patrick Buygel; Netherlands
200 m freestyle L3	Jorgen Magner; Sweden	Marco Elout; Netherlands	Danijel Pavlinec; Yugoslavia
400 m freestyle 4	Jeffrey van Loon; Netherlands	Shlomo Pinto; Israel	Abdeljalal Biare; Morocco
400 m freestyle 5	Piotr Finder; Poland	Bernard Micorec; France	Wayne Ryding; Australia
400 m freestyle 6	Luis Leardy; Spain	Tomas Hainey; Canada	Gerard Dunne; Ireland
400 m freestyle A2	Stephane Lecours; Canada	Vincent Maassen; Netherlands	Michael Doyle; United States
400 m freestyle A4	Johan Mosterd; Netherlands	David Moreton; Great Britain	Ron Bolotin; Israel
400 m freestyle A6	Hideaki Mogi; Japan	Kim Due Andersen; Denmark	None
400 m freestyle A8	Gui Ping Liu; China	Tomas Kjellqvist; Sweden	Hanoch Budin; Israel
400 m freestyle B1	Timothy McIsaac; Canada	Lars-Ove Nederman; Sweden	Oleg Cher; Soviet Union
400 m freestyle B2	Lee Grenon; Canada	Christopher Holmes; Great Britain	Wieslaw Krol; Poland
400 m freestyle B3	Michael Edgson; Canada	John Friedrick; United States	Flemming Berthelsen; Denmark
400 m freestyle C3–4	Robin Surgeoner; Great Britain	Martin Parker; United States	Mats Brisenfelt; Sweden
400 m freestyle C5	Anders Christensen; Denmark	Michael Quickert; West Germany	Kasper Engel; Netherlands
400 m freestyle C8	Hans Pauwels; Belgium	Thomas Klinger; West Germany	Karl Mayr; Austria
400 m freestyle L4	Marcel Poulisse; Netherlands	Michael Lapp; West Germany	Andrew Gilbert; Great Britain
400 m freestyle L5	Holger Woelk; West Germany	Paul Noble; Great Britain	Olafur Eiriksson; Iceland
400 m freestyle L6	Mats Einarsson; Sweden	Gyorgy Tory; Hungary	Gianluca Saini; Italy
25 m backstroke 1A	Mike Kenny; Great Britain	Phillip Tracey; Australia	William Gilly; United States
25 m backstroke 1B	James Thompson; United States	Kyriakos Griveas; Greece	Gerhard Hausleitner; West Germany
25 m backstroke 1C	Krzysztof Sleczka; Poland	Luca Pancalli; Italy	Fábio Ricci; Brazil
25 m backstroke L1	John Petersson; Denmark	Hans Coster; Sweden	Franck Maille; France
50 m backstroke 2	Ernesto Giussani; Italy	Marek Szpojnarowicz; Poland	Jean Marc Durieux; France
50 m backstroke 3	Miroslaw Owczarek; Poland	Mohamed Ait Aissa; France	Arkadiusz Pawlowski; Poland
50 m backstroke A5	David Foppolo; France	Eric Richard; France	Bogdan Kozon; Poland
50 m backstroke C6	Joris van Geel; Netherlands	Paul Hancook; Great Britain	Darron Crouse; United States
50 m backstroke L3	Jorgen Magner; Sweden	Marco Elout; Netherlands	Andras Toth; Hungary
100 m backstroke 4	Adam Pielak; Poland	Jeffrey van Loon; Netherlands	James Terpenning; United States
100 m backstroke 5	Bernard Micorec; France	Zbigniew Sajkiewicz; Poland	Herve Prisset; France
100 m backstroke 6	Gerard Dunne; Ireland	Jorge Gotzens; Spain	Juan Castane; Spain
100 m backstroke A2	Stephane Lecours; Canada	Jonas Oskarson; Iceland	Vincent Maassen; Netherlands
100 m backstroke A4	Johan Mosterd; Netherlands	Robert Gallais; France	Marc Woods; Great Britain
100 m backstroke A6	Zusheng Cai; China	Zebing Liu; China	Kim Due Andersen; Denmark
100 m backstroke A7	Heinz Barnbeck; West Germany	Andrzej Wojciechowski; Poland	Roko Mikelin; Yugoslavia
100 m backstroke A8	Hanoch Budin; Israel	Emmanuel Lacroix; France	Philip Mindorff; Canada
100 m backstroke B1	Timothy McIsaac; Canada	Oleg Cher; Soviet Union	Corrado Daglio; Italy
100 m backstroke B2	Wieslaw Krol; Poland	Pablo Corral; Spain	Jack Krier; United States
100 m backstroke B3	Michael Edgson; Canada	Noel Pedersen; Norway	John Friedrick; United States
100 m backstroke C3	Haakon Henne; Norway	Claude Badie; France	Boaz Avhar; Israel
100 m backstroke C5	Martin Mansell; Great Britain	Michael Quickert; West Germany	Anders Christensen; Denmark
100 m backstroke L4	Joop Stokkel; Netherlands	Andrew Gilbert; Great Britain	Michael Lapp; West Germany
100 m backstroke L5	Holger Woelk; West Germany	Paul Noble; Great Britain	Henk de Groot; Netherlands
100 m backstroke L6	Mats Einarsson; Sweden	Alberto Gomez; Spain	Alessandro Pisetta; Italy
200 m backstroke C3	Jong Woo Kim; South Korea	Claude Badie; France	Boaz Avhar; Israel
200 m backstroke C5	Anders Christensen; Denmark	Michael Quickert; West Germany	Martin Mansell; Great Britain
25 m breaststroke 1A	Mike Kenny; Great Britain	Carlos Maslup; Argentina	William Gilly; United States
25 m breaststroke 1B	James Thompson; United States	Gerhard Hausleitner; West Germany	Tomasz Dabrowski; Poland
25 m breaststroke 1C	Luca Pancalli; Italy	Krzysztof Sleczka; Poland	Fábio Ricci; Brazil
25 m breaststroke L1	John Petersson; Denmark	Hans Coster; Sweden	Franck Maille; France
50 m breaststroke 2	Bernd Eickemeyer; West Germany	Chris Hallam; Great Britain	Ernesto Giussani; Italy
50 m breaststroke 3	Ian Jaquiss; United States	Arkadiusz Pawlowski; Poland	Joseph Wengier; Israel
50 m breaststroke B1	Izhar Cohen; Israel	Lars-Ove Nederman; Sweden	Yuefu Huang; China
50 m breaststroke B2	Jose Pedrajas; Spain	Eric Ghysel; France	Roman Reszczyński; Poland
50 m breaststroke B3	Noel Pedersen; Norway	Brian Hudson; United States	Kingsley Bugarin; Australia
50 m breaststroke C6	Joris van Geel; Netherlands	Jeff Worobetz; Canada	Takeshi Ohori; Japan
50 m breaststroke L3	Matthias Schlubeck; West Germany	Marco Elout; Netherlands	Mogens Christensen; Denmark
100 m breaststroke 4	Jeffrey van Loon; Netherlands	Shlomo Pinto; Israel	Adam Pielak; Poland
100 m breaststroke 5	Bernard Micorec; France	Zbigniew Sajkiewicz; Poland	Simon Ahlstad; Sweden
100 m breaststroke A1	Yan Hu Wu; China	Wenhua Liu; China	Geza Dukai; Hungary
100 m breaststroke A2	Stephane Lecours; Canada	Michael Doyle; United States	Jan Chryczyk; Poland
100 m breaststroke A4	Johan Mosterd; Netherlands	Jiaman Zhang; China	Sean McGrath; Ireland
100 m breaststroke A5	Eric Richard; France	Stefano Giovannetti; Italy	Bogdan Kozon; Poland
100 m breaststroke A6	Zusheng Cai; China	Zebing Liu; China	Sandor Takacs; Hungary
100 m breaststroke A8	Greg Hammond; Australia	Geir Sverrisson; Iceland	Hanoch Budin; Israel
100 m breaststroke B1	Lars-Ove Nederman; Sweden	Izhar Cohen; Israel	Vladimir Sigidov; Soviet Union
100 m breaststroke B2	Jose Pedrajas; Spain	Alexandre Gapon; Soviet Union	Roman Reszczyński; Poland
100 m breaststroke B3	Noel Pedersen; Norway	Brian Hudson; United States	Kingsley Bugarin; Australia
100 m breaststroke C4	Robin Surgeoner; Great Britain	Mats Brisenfelt; Sweden	Hansole Noe; Denmark
100 m breaststroke C8	Hans Pauwels; Belgium	Patrick Buygel; Netherlands	Sang Tae Bae; South Korea
100 m breaststroke L4	Joop Stokkel; Netherlands	Eric Fleury; France	Erling Trondsen; Norway
100 m breaststroke L5	Henk de Groot; Netherlands	Holger Woelk; West Germany	Rutger Sturkenboom; Netherlands
100 m breaststroke L6	Jochen Hahnengress; West Germany	Mats Einarsson; Sweden	Alberto Gomez; Spain
200 m breaststroke B1	Lars-Ove Nederman; Sweden	Vladimir Sigidov; Soviet Union	Timothy McIsaac; Canada
200 m breaststroke B2	Jose Pedrajas; Spain	Alexandre Gapon; Soviet Union	Roman Reszczynski; Poland
200 m breaststroke B3	Noel Pedersen; Norway	Brian Hudson; United States	Kingsley Bugarin; Australia
25 m butterfly 1A	Alvise de Vidi; Italy	William Gilly; United States	Scott Hager; United States
25 m butterfly 1B	James Thompson; United States	Gerhard Hausleitner; West Germany	Ashraf Marei; Egypt
25 m butterfly 2	Kevin Sullivan; United States	Mark Butler; Great Britain	Marek Szpojnarowicz; Poland
25 m butterfly 3	Arkadiusz Pawlowski; Poland	Patrick Moyses; France	Miroslaw Owczarek; Poland
50 m butterfly 4	Shlomo Pinto; Israel	Jeffrey van Loon; Netherlands	Pascal Auclair; France
50 m butterfly A5	David Foppolo; France	Eric Richard; France	Bogdan Kozon; Poland
50 m butterfly L3	Jorgen Magner; Sweden	Mogens Christensen; Denmark	Kim Andersen; Denmark
100 m butterfly 5	Piotr Finder; Poland	Moises Galindo; Mexico	Bernard Micorec; France
100 m butterfly 6	Gerard Dunne; Ireland	Tomas Hainey; Canada	Luis Leardy; Spain
100 m butterfly A2	Stephane Lecours; Canada	Peter Aldous; Great Britain	David Griffin; Australia
100 m butterfly A4	Ron Bolotin; Israel	David Moreton; Great Britain	Johan Mosterd; Netherlands
100 m butterfly A6	Zebing Liu; China	Zbigniew Odachowski; Poland	Kim Due Andersen; Denmark
100 m butterfly A8	Gui Ping Liu; China	Tomas Kjellqvist; Sweden	Emmanuel Lacroix; France
100 m butterfly B1	Timothy McIsaac; Canada	Alberto Dauden; Spain	Jorge Mary; Spain
100 m butterfly B2	Lee Grenon; Canada	Roman Reszczynski; Poland	Eric Ghysel; France
100 m butterfly B3	Michael Edgson; Canada	Flemming Berthelsen; Denmark	Ian Sharpe; Great Britain
100 m butterfly L4	Erling Trondsen; Norway	Marcel Poulisse; Netherlands	Joop Stokkel; Netherlands
100 m butterfly L5	Paul Noble; Great Britain	Claude Dupin; France	Olafur Eiriksson; Iceland
100 m butterfly L6	Mats Einarsson; Sweden	Alberto Gomez; Spain	Leandro Ramos Santos; Brazil
100 m individual medley 2	Marek Szpojnarowicz; Poland	Ernesto Giussani; Italy	Bernd Eickemeyer; West Germany
100 m individual medley 3	Arkadiusz Pawlowski; Poland	Miroslaw Owczarek; Poland	Brent Gibson; New Zealand
75 m individual medley 1A	Mike Kenny; Great Britain	Carlos Maslup; Argentina	Al Mootasem Haly Hegazi; Egypt
75 m individual medley 1B	James Thompson; United States	Tomasz Dabrowski; Poland	Gerhard Hausleitner; West Germany
200 m individual medley 4	Shlomo Pinto; Israel	Jeffrey van Loon; Netherlands	Pascal Auclair; France
200 m individual medley 5	Moises Galindo; Mexico	Bernard Micorec; France	Zbigniew Sajkiewicz; Poland
200 m individual medley 6	Luis Leardy; Spain	Tomas Hainey; Canada	Gerard Dunne; Ireland
200 m individual medley A1	Yan Hu Wu; China	Wenhua Liu; China	Artur Jeznach; Poland
200 m individual medley A2	Stephane Lecours; Canada	Michael Doyle; United States	Vincent Maassen; Netherlands
200 m individual medley A4	Johan Mosterd; Netherlands	Ron Bolotin; Israel	David Moreton; Great Britain
200 m individual medley A5	David Foppolo; France	Bogdan Kozon; Poland	Eric Richard; France
200 m individual medley A6	Zusheng Cai; China	Kim Due Andersen; Denmark	Zebing Liu; China
200 m individual medley A8	Hanoch Budin; Israel	Gui Ping Liu; China	Tomas Kjellqvist; Sweden
200 m individual medley B1	Timothy McIsaac; Canada	Oleg Cher; Soviet Union	Jorge Mary; Spain
200 m individual medley B2	Per Andersson; Sweden	Jose Corral; Spain	Eric Ghysel; France
200 m individual medley B3	Michael Edgson; Canada	Noel Pedersen; Norway	Brian Hudson; United States
200 m individual medley C5	Anders Christensen; Denmark	Martin Mansell; Great Britain	Michael Quickert; West Germany
200 m individual medley C8	Hans Pauwels; Belgium	Karl Mayr; Austria	Janos Becsey; Hungary
200 m individual medley L3	Jorgen Magner; Sweden	Mogens Christensen; Denmark	Marco Elout; Netherlands
200 m individual medley L4	Erling Trondsen; Norway	Joop Stokkel; Netherlands	Marcel Poulisse; Netherlands
200 m individual medley L5	Holger Woelk; West Germany	Paul Noble; Great Britain	Rutger Sturkenboom; Netherlands
200 m individual medley L6	Mats Einarsson; Sweden	Gianluca Saini; Italy	Alberto Gomez; Spain
400 m individual medley B2	Per Andersson; Sweden	Wieslaw Krol; Poland	Lee Grenon; Canada
400 m individual medley B3	Michael Edgson; Canada	Brian Hudson; United States	Noel Pedersen; Norway
3×25 m freestyle relay 1A–1C	United States (USA)	Great Britain (GBR)	Italy (ITA); Maurizio Galliani; Luca Pancalli; Franco Scotto
4×50 m freestyle relay A1–A8	France (FRA)	Australia (AUS)	Great Britain (GBR)
4 × 100 m freestyle relay A–L	Great Britain (GBR)	Netherlands (NED)	France (FRA)
4 × 100 m freestyle relay B1–B3	Canada (CAN)	Soviet Union (URS)	United States (USA)
3×50 m medley relay 2–4	United States (USA)	Poland (POL)	Israel (ISR)
4×50 m medley relay A1–A8	France (FRA)	Great Britain (GBR)	Netherlands (NED)
4 × 100 m medley relay A–L	Great Britain (GBR)	Sweden (SWE)	Netherlands (NED)
4 × 100 m medley relay B1–B3	Canada (CAN)	Soviet Union (URS)	Spain (ESP)
4 × 100 m medley relay T/P open	Spain (ESP)	France (FRA): Bernard Mikoreck; Christian Gonneau; Hervé Prisset; Pascal Auclair	Israel (ISR): Uri Bergman; Tal Golan; Shlomo Pinto; Joseph Wengier

=== Women's events ===
Event	Gold	Silver	Bronze
50 m freestyle 2	Cynthia Gettinger; United States	Judith Smith; United States	Lyn Lillecrapp; Australia
50 m freestyle B1	Janice Burton; Great Britain	Magdalena Tjernberg; Sweden	Yvette Weicker; Canada
50 m freestyle B2	Trischa Zorn; United States	Angela McDowell; Great Britain	Tatiana Chipovalova; Soviet Union
50 m freestyle B3	Debra Brandewie; United States	Nadežda Maksimova; Soviet Union	Gabriella Tjernberg; Sweden
50 m freestyle L1	Genevieve Pairoux; France	Béatrice Pierre; France	Anne-Lie Osterstrom; Sweden
50 m freestyle L2	Marita Johansson; Sweden	Nancy Stewart; United States	Ritva Nikkilä; Finland
100 m freestyle 4	Beverley Gull; Great Britain	Arden Adams; United States	Soley Axelsdottir; Iceland
100 m freestyle 5	Ana Peiro; Spain	Esther Eroles; Spain	Malgorzata Adamik; Poland
100 m freestyle 6	Graciana Moreira Alves; Brazil	Nancy Clarke; United States	Maria Jussara Matos; Brazil
100 m freestyle A2	Cecilia Karlsson; Sweden	Jan Wilson; United States	Lilja Snorradottir; Iceland
100 m freestyle A4	Gritt Barlund; Denmark	Joanne Mucz; Canada	Dianne Barr; Great Britain
100 m freestyle A8	Kristina Brokholc; Sweden	Charlotte Hede; Denmark	Staci Perrigo; United States
100 m freestyle B1	Magdalena Tjernberg; Sweden	Yvette Weicker; Canada	Janice Burton; Great Britain
100 m freestyle B2	Trischa Zorn; United States	Angela McDowell; Great Britain	Tatiana Chipovalova; Soviet Union
100 m freestyle B3	Debra Brandewie; United States	Gabriella Tjernberg; Sweden	Nadežda Maksimova; Soviet Union
100 m freestyle C4	Tammy Barker; Canada	Jane Stidever; Great Britain	Miri Sisso; Israel
100 m freestyle C6	Sandra Yaxley; Australia	Helene Binet; France	Susan Chick; Canada
100 m freestyle C8	Marga Aarts; Netherlands	Katrin Johansen; Faroe Islands	Judy Goodrich; Canada
100 m freestyle L2	Marita Johansson; Sweden	Ritva Nikkilä; Finland	Anne-Dorte Andersen; Denmark
100 m freestyle L4	Lucyna Krajewska; Poland	Britta Siegers; West Germany	Maj Berger Sether; Norway
100 m freestyle L5	Agnes Beraudias; France	Goislaine Cristallo; France	Miia Rantanen; Finland
100 m freestyle L5	Agnes Beraudias; France	Goislaine Cristallo; France	Helen Lewis; Great Britain
100 m freestyle L6	Claudia Hengst; West Germany	Tora Vid Keldu; Faroe Islands	Sjerstin Vermeulen; Netherlands
200 m freestyle C4	Tammy Barker; Canada	Jane Stidever; Great Britain	Victoria Williams; United States
400 m freestyle 4	Beverley Gull; Great Britain	Arden Adams; United States	Hisako Touchi; Japan
400 m freestyle 5	Ana Peiro; Spain	Esther Eroles; Spain	Malgorzata Adamik; Poland
400 m freestyle 6	Heidi Kopp; West Germany	Nancy Clarke; United States	Pilar Javaloyas; Spain
400 m freestyle A2	Cecilia Karlsson; Sweden	Linda Walters; Great Britain	Deborah Holland; Australia
400 m freestyle A4	Joanne Mucz; Canada	Gritt Barlund; Denmark	Dianne Barr; Great Britain
400 m freestyle A8	Judith Young; Australia	Charlotte Hede; Denmark	Isabelle Duranceau; France
400 m freestyle B1	Magdalena Tjernberg; Sweden	Janice Burton; Great Britain	Eeva Riitta Kukkonen; Finland
400 m freestyle B2	Trischa Zorn; United States	Eva Andersson; Sweden	Angela McDowell; Great Britain
400 m freestyle B3	Debra Brandewie; United States	Gabriella Tjernberg; Sweden	Michelle Arnold; Canada
400 m freestyle C3–4	Jane Stidever; Great Britain	Christina Naess; Faroe Islands	Victoria Williams; United States
400 m freestyle L6	Claudia Hengst; West Germany	Sjerstin Vermeulen; Netherlands	Tora Vid Keldu; Faroe Islands
25 m backstroke L1	Béatrice Pierre; France	Anne-Lie Osterstrom; Sweden	Genevieve Pairoux; France
50 m backstroke 2	Cynthia Gettinger; United States	Judith Smith; United States	Lyn Lillecrapp; Australia
50 m backstroke C6	Helene Binet; France	Sandra Yaxley; Australia	Stephanie Sloan; United States
50 m backstroke L2	Ritva Nikkilä; Finland	Marita Johansson; Sweden	Nancy Stewart; United States
100 m backstroke 4	Beverley Gull; Great Britain	Arden Adams; United States	LeNae Liebetrau; United States
100 m backstroke 5	Ana Peiro; Spain	Esther Eroles; Spain	Malgorzata Adamik; Poland
100 m backstroke 6	Pilar Javaloyas; Spain	Nancy Clarke; United States	Heidi Kopp; West Germany
100 m backstroke A2	Jacqueline Nannenberg; Netherlands	Cecilia Karlsson; Sweden	Lilja Snorradottir; Iceland
100 m backstroke A4	Dianne Barr; Great Britain	Joanne Mucz; Canada	Susan Knox; Australia
100 m backstroke A8	Judith Young; Australia	Joanne Round; Great Britain	Jeanette Pedersen; Denmark
100 m backstroke B1	Yvette Weicker; Canada	Janice Burton; Great Britain	Eeva Riitta Kukkonen; Finland
100 m backstroke B2	Trischa Zorn; United States	Paivi Tolonen; Finland	Angela McDowell; Great Britain
100 m backstroke B3	Debra Brandewie; United States	Gabriella Tjernberg; Sweden	Michelle Arnold; Canada
100 m backstroke C3	Christina Naess; Faroe Islands	Catherine Huggett; Australia	Anne Trotman; Great Britain
100 m backstroke C4	Jane Stidever; Great Britain	Tammy Barker; Canada	Yvonne Lumineau; France
100 m backstroke C8	Marga Aarts; Netherlands	Judy Goodrich; Canada	Katrin Johansen; Faroe Islands
100 m backstroke L4	Britta Siegers; West Germany	Jeanette Esling; Great Britain	Maj Berger Sether; Norway
100 m backstroke L6	Claudia Hengst; West Germany	Sjerstin Vermeulen; Netherlands	Thelma Young; Great Britain
25 m breaststroke L1	Genevieve Pairoux; France	Manja Haugsted; Denmark	Tara Flood; Great Britain
50 m breaststroke 2	Cynthia Gettinger; United States	Lyn Lillecrapp; Australia	Karen Lagrange; United States
50 m breaststroke B1	Magdalena Tjernberg; Sweden	Louise Byles; Great Britain	Yvette Weicker; Canada
50 m breaststroke B2	Trischa Zorn; United States	Tatiana Chipovalova; Soviet Union	Carine van Puyvelde; Belgium
50 m breaststroke B3	Gabriella Tjernberg; Sweden	Mandy Maywood; Australia	Debra Brandewie; United States
50 m breaststroke L2	Marie-Louise Freij; Sweden	Pamela Danberg; United States	Anne-Dorte Andersen; Denmark
100 m breaststroke 5	Malgorzata Adamik; Poland	Esther Eroles; Spain	Lena-Marie Hagman; Sweden
100 m breaststroke 6	Heidi Kopp; West Germany	Beatriz Greco; Argentina	Graciana Moreira Alves; Brazil
100 m breaststroke A2	Cecilia Karlsson; Sweden	Jan Wilson; United States	Smadar Tzur; Israel
100 m breaststroke A8	Kristina Brokholc; Sweden	Judith Young; Australia	Isabelle Duranceau; France
100 m breaststroke B1	Magdalena Tjernberg; Sweden	Louise Byles; Great Britain	Yvette Weicker; Canada
100 m breaststroke B2	Trischa Zorn; United States	Carine van Puyvelde; Belgium	Tatiana Chipovalova; Soviet Union
100 m breaststroke B3	Gabriella Tjernberg; Sweden	Debra Brandewie; United States	Mandy Maywood; Australia
100 m breaststroke C4	Miri Sisso; Israel	Jane Stidever; Great Britain	Janette Cordery; New Zealand
100 m breaststroke L5	Laura Tramuns; Spain	Miia Rantanen; Finland	Esthel Sauter; Switzerland
100 m breaststroke L6	Claudia Hengst; West Germany	Sjerstin Vermeulen; Netherlands	Thelma Young; Great Britain
200 m breaststroke B1	Magdalena Tjernberg; Sweden	Louise Byles; Great Britain	Tamara Boccaccio; Canada
200 m breaststroke B2	Trischa Zorn; United States	Carine van Puyvelde; Belgium	Tatiana Chipovalova; Soviet Union
200 m breaststroke B3	Gabriella Tjernberg; Sweden	Debra Brandewie; United States	Mandy Maywood; Australia
25 m butterfly 2	Cynthia Gettinger; United States	Karen Lagrange; United States	Lyn Lillecrapp; Australia
100 m butterfly 6	Pilar Javaloyas; Spain	Maria Jussara Matos; Brazil	Graciana Moreira Alves; Brazil
100 m butterfly A2	Smadar Tzur; Israel	Jan Wilson; United States	Jacqueline Nannenberg; Netherlands
100 m butterfly A8	Charlotte Hede; Denmark	Joanne Round; Great Britain	Isabelle Duranceau; France
100 m butterfly B1	Eeva Riitta Kukkonen; Finland	Magdalena Tjernberg; Sweden	Janice Burton; Great Britain
100 m butterfly B2	Trischa Zorn; United States	Angela McDowell; Great Britain	Eva Andersson; Sweden
100 m butterfly L6	Claudia Hengst; West Germany	Judith Young; Australia	Tora Vid Keldu; Faroe Islands
200 m individual medley 6	Heidi Kopp; West Germany	Nancy Clarke; United States	Beatriz Greco; Argentina
200 m individual medley A2	Lilja Snorradottir; Iceland	Jacqueline Nannenberg; Netherlands	Jan Wilson; United States
200 m individual medley A8	Charlotte Hede; Denmark	Joanne Round; Great Britain	Isabelle Duranceau; France
200 m individual medley B1	Magdalena Tjernberg; Sweden	Janice Burton; Great Britain	Yvette Weicker; Canada
200 m individual medley B2	Trischa Zorn; United States	Paivi Tolonen; Finland	Angela McDowell; Great Britain
200 m individual medley B3	Debra Brandewie; United States	Gabriella Tjernberg; Sweden	Michelle Arnold; Canada
200 m individual medley L6	Claudia Hengst; West Germany	Judith Young; Australia	Sjerstin Vermeulen; Netherlands
400 m individual medley B2	Trischa Zorn; United States	Angela McDowell; Great Britain	Tatiana Chipovalova; Soviet Union
400 m individual medley B3	Debra Brandewie; United States	Gabriella Tjernberg; Sweden	Michelle Arnold; Canada
4 × 100 m freestyle relay A–L	Great Britain (GBR)	Australia (AUS)	Denmark (DEN)
4 × 100 m freestyle relay B1–B3	United States (USA)	Sweden (SWE)	Great Britain (GBR)
4 × 100 m medley relay A–L	Great Britain (GBR)	Denmark (DEN)	France (FRA)
4 × 100 m medley relay B1–B3	United States (USA)	Sweden (SWE)	Canada (CAN)
