= Spain at the 1988 Summer Paralympics =

- IPC code: ESP
- NPC: Spanish Paralympic Committee
- Website: www.paralimpicos.es (in Spanish)

in Seoul
- Medals: Gold 18 Silver 13 Bronze 12 Total 43

Summer Paralympics appearances (overview)
- 1968; 1972; 1976; 1980; 1984; 1988; 1992; 1996; 2000; 2004; 2008; 2012; 2016; 2020; 2024

Spain won 18 gold medals, 13 silver medals and 12 bronze medals.

In 1988, Spain had competitors in archery, wheelchair basketball, swimming, weightlifting, shooting, table tennis and athletics.

== Background ==
The 1988 Games were held in Seoul, South Korea. The Games used the same venues as the Summer Olympics. Competitors with spinal cord injuries, amputations, cerebral palsy, Les Autres and vision impairments were eligible to compete in these Games.

== Closing ceremonies ==
There were concerns that the number of medals awarded on the final day of competition would mean that competitors would not be able to attend the 1988 Games closing ceremonies where the flag of Spain was to be raised as the host of the next Games.

== Archery ==
One of Spain's bronze medals came in archery. It was won by an athlete with a physical disability.

| Event | Gold | Silver | Bronze |
|---|---|---|---|
| Men's double FITA round open | Tae Sung An; South Korea | Carmelo Scalisi; Belgium | Antonio Rebollo; Spain |

== Athletics ==
Six of Spain's gold medals, three silver medals and three bronze medals came in athletics. Eight medals were won by athletes with vision impairments, four won by athletes with cerebral palsy, and nine by athletes with physical impairments.

| Event | Gold | Silver | Bronze |
|---|---|---|---|
| 800 m A6/A8–9/L4 | Angel Marin; Spain | Harri Jauhiainen; Finland | Jean-Yves Arvier; France |
| 800 m C8 | Robert Biancucci; Australia | Keith Pittman; United States | Javier Salmerón; Spain |
| 1500 m A6/A8–9/L4 | Angel Marin; Spain | Kai Pirttijärvi; Finland | Sameh Ahmed; Egypt |
| 1500 m B2 | Mariano Ruiz; Spain | Noel Thatcher; Great Britain | Michel Pavon; France |
| 5000 m A6/A8–9/L4 | Angel Marin; Spain | Hyun Sik Hwang; South Korea | Slobodan Adzic; Yugoslavia |
| 5000 m B2 | Mariano Ruiz; Spain | Michel Pavon; France | A. Pomykalov; Soviet Union |
| Long jump B1 | Mineho Ozaki; Japan | Antonio Delgado; Spain | Victor Riabochtan; Soviet Union |
| Triple jump B1 | Mineho Ozaki; Japan | Sergei Sevastianov; Soviet Union | José Manuel Rodríguez; Spain |
| 100 m B1 | Purificacion Santamarta; Spain | Bang Wol Kim; South Korea | Rossella Inverni; Italy |
| 400 m B1 | Tamara Pankova; Soviet Union | Purificacion Santamarta; Spain | Rossella Inverni; Italy |
| Long jump B1 | Joke van Rijswijk; Netherlands | Purificacion Santamarta; Spain | Lori Bennett; United States |

== Swimming ==
Twelve of Spain's gold medals, ten silver medals and eight bronze medals came in swimming. Three medals were won by athletes with vision impairments, nine by athletes with a physical disability and one by an athlete with cerebral palsy.

| Event | Gold | Silver | Bronze |
|---|---|---|---|
| 400 m freestyle 6 | Luis Leardy; Spain | Tomas Hainey; Canada | Gerard Dunne; Ireland |
| 100 m backstroke 6 | Gerard Dunne; Ireland | Jorge Gotzens; Spain | Juan Castane; Spain |
| 100 m backstroke B2 | Wieslaw Krol; Poland | Pablo Corral; Spain | Jack Krier; United States |
| 100 m backstroke L6 | Mats Einarsson; Sweden | Alberto Gomez; Spain | Alessandro Pisetta; Italy |
| 50 m breaststroke B2 | Jose Pedrajas; Spain | Eric Ghysel; France | Roman Reszczynski; Poland |
| 100 m breaststroke B2 | Jose Pedrajas; Spain | Alexandre Gapon; Soviet Union | Roman Reszczynski; Poland |
| 100 m breaststroke L6 | Jochen Hahnengress; West Germany | Mats Einarsson; Sweden | Alberto Gomez; Spain |
| 200 m breaststroke B2 | Jose Pedrajas; Spain | Alexandre Gapon; Soviet Union | Roman Reszczynski; Poland |
| 100 m butterfly 6 | Gerard Dunne; Ireland | Tomas Hainey; Canada | Luis Leardy; Spain |
| 100 m butterfly B1 | Timothy McIsaac; Canada | Alberto Dauden; Spain | Jorge Mary; Spain |
| 100 m butterfly L6 | Mats Einarsson; Sweden | Alberto Gomez; Spain | Leandro Ramos Santos; Brazil |
| 200 m individual medley 6 | Luis Leardy; Spain | Tomas Hainey; Canada | Gerard Dunne; Ireland |
| 200 m individual medley B1 | Timothy McIsaac; Canada | Oleg Cher; Soviet Union | Jorge Mary; Spain |
| 200 m individual medley B2 | Per Andersson; Sweden | Jose Corral; Spain | Eric Ghysel; France |
| 200 m individual medley L6 | Mats Einarsson; Sweden | Gianluca Saini; Italy | Alberto Gomez; Spain |
| 4 × 100 m medley relay B1–B3 | Canada (CAN) | Soviet Union (URS) | Spain (ESP) |
| 4 × 100 m medley relay T/P open | Spain (ESP) | France (FRA) | Israel (ISR) |
| 100 m freestyle 5 | Ana Peiro; Spain | Esther Eroles; Spain | Malgorzata Adamik; Poland |
| 400 m freestyle 5 | Ana Peiro; Spain | Esther Eroles; Spain | Malgorzata Adamik; Poland |
| 400 m freestyle 6 | Heidi Kopp; West Germany | Nancy Clarke; United States | Pilar Javaloyas; Spain |
| 100 m backstroke 5 | Ana Peiro; Spain | Esther Eroles; Spain | Malgorzata Adamik; Poland |
| 100 m backstroke 6 | Pilar Javaloyas; Spain | Nancy Clarke; United States | Heidi Kopp; West Germany |
| 100 m breaststroke 5 | Malgorzata Adamik; Poland | Esther Eroles; Spain | Lena-Marie Hagman; Sweden |
| 100 m breaststroke L5 | Laura Tramuns; Spain | Miia Rantanen; Finland | Esthel Sauter; Switzerland |
| 100 m butterfly 6 | Pilar Javaloyas; Spain | Maria Jussara Matos; Brazil | Graciana Moreira Alves; Brazil |
