= Archery at the 1988 Summer Paralympics =

Archery at the VIII Paralympic Games
- Paralympic Archery
- Venue: Sangmu Sports Complex
- Dates: 16 to 22 October
- Competitors: 110 from 22 nations

Paralympic symbol (1988-1994)

Archery at the 1988 Summer Paralympics consisted of nine events.

== Medal table ==
Rank	Nation	Gold	Silver	Bronze	Total
1	South Korea (KOR)	4	1	1	6
2	Great Britain (GBR)	2	0	0	2
3	Finland (FIN)	1	2	1	4
4	Belgium (BEL)	1	1	0	2
5	Switzerland (SUI)	1	0	0	1
6	Japan (JPN)	0	2	1	3
6	West Germany (FRG)	0	2	1	3
8	Italy (ITA)	0	1	1	2
9	Denmark (DEN)	0	0	1	1
9	France (FRA)	0	0	1	1
9	Spain (ESP)	0	0	1	1
9	United States (USA)	0	0	1	1
Totals (12 entries)		9	9	9	27

=== Participating nations ===
- Australia (3)
- Austria (2)
- Belgium (6)
- Canada (1)
- Colombia (1)
- Cyprus (2)
- Denmark (1)
- Finland (11)
- France (4)
- Great Britain (13)
- Hong Kong (5)
- Italy (7)
- Japan (10)
- Netherlands (1)
- New Zealand (1)
- Puerto Rico (4)
- South Korea (10)
- Spain (1)
- Sweden (7)
- Switzerland (2)
- United States (7)
- West Germany (11)

== Medal summary ==
Event	Gold	Silver	Bronze
Men's double FITA round 2–6	Michel Baudois; Switzerland	Hee Sook Kim; South Korea	Udo Wolf; West Germany
Men's double FITA round open	Tae Sung An; South Korea	Carmelo Scalisi; Belgium	Antonio Rebollo; Spain
Men's double FITA round team 2–6	South Korea (KOR); Ki Ki Jang; Hee Sook Kim; Ho Sung Kim; Choon Heung Yoon	Italy (ITA); Fabio Amadi; Giuseppe Gabelli; Giuliano Koten; Orazio Pizzorni	Japan (JPN); Yoshihiro Inoue; Michio Okanishi; Junji Uchiyama; Shigetoshi Yoshida
Men's double FITA round team open	South Korea (KOR); Tae Sung An; Hyun Kwan Cho; Sung Hee Kim; Hak Young Lee	Finland (FIN); Keijo Kallunki; Raimo Tirronen; Veijo Viinikka	France (FRA); Lucien Courtillon; Jean-Michel Favre; Daniel Lelou
Men's double short metric round 1A–1C	Martti Rantavouri; Finland	Narumi Fujii; Japan	Michael Stauner; United States
Men's single FITA round C7–C8	Alfons Kuys; Belgium	Kiyotaka Tashiro; Japan	Kyung Sun Kim; South Korea
Women's double FITA round 2–6	Karen Watts; Great Britain	Elli Korva; Finland	Paola Fantato; Italy
Women's double FITA round open	Kyung Hee Lee; South Korea	Anneliese Dersen; West Germany	Birthe Morgensen; Denmark
Women's double FITA round team 2–6	Great Britain (GBR); Wilma Anic; Joan Cooper; Karen Watts	West Germany (FRG); Ursula Drosdziok; Inge Enzmann; Karin Kieblich	Finland (FIN); Sirkka Liisa Collin; Hilkka Jokivirta; Elli Korva
