= Table tennis at the 1988 Summer Paralympics =

Table tennis at the VIII Paralympic Games
- Paralympic Table tennis
- Venue: Seoul National University Gymnasium

Paralympic symbol (1988-1994)

Table tennis at the 1988 Summer Paralympics consisted of 37 events, 27 for men and 10 for women.

== Medal table ==
Rank	Nation	Gold	Silver	Bronze	Total
1	West Germany (FRG)	10	10	8	28
2	France (FRA)	6	4	2	12
3	South Korea (KOR)	4	7	1	12
4	United States (USA)	4	1	2	7
5	China (CHN)	3	0	1	4
6	Sweden (SWE)	2	3	3	8
7	Austria (AUT)	2	2	5	9
8	Switzerland (SUI)	2	1	0	3
9	Netherlands (NED)	2	0	1	3
10	Great Britain (GBR)	1	1	1	3
11	Finland (FIN)	1	0	1	2
12	Denmark (DEN)	0	2	3	5
13	Belgium (BEL)	0	2	2	4
14	Japan (JPN)	0	2	0	2
15	Norway (NOR)	0	1	2	3
16	Yugoslavia (YUG)	0	1	0	1
17	Hungary (HUN)	0	0	3	3
18	Hong Kong (HKG)	0	0	1	1
18	Ireland (IRL)	0	0	1	1
Totals (19 entries)		37	37	37	111

== Medal summary ==
=== Men's events ===
Event	Gold	Silver	Bronze
Singles 1A–4	Michael Dempsey; United States	Guy Tisserant; France	Herbert Velroyen; West Germany
Singles 1A	Hae Gon Lee; South Korea	Kang Sung-hoon; South Korea	Matti Launonen; Finland
Singles 1B	Rudolf Hajek; Austria	Bruno Hassler; West Germany	Svein Bjornar Simensen; Norway
Singles 1C	Manfred Emmel; West Germany	Rudolf Jaksch; West Germany	Daniel Jeannin; France
Singles 2	Michel Peeters; France	Young Soo Kim; South Korea	Fritz Altendorfer; Austria
Singles 3	Peter Starl; Austria	Ki Hoon Kim; South Korea	Christian Sutter; Austria
Singles 4	Thomas Kreidel; West Germany	Peter Schmidt; West Germany	Michael Dempsey; United States
Singles C5	Harold Kersten; Netherlands	Koji Inada; Japan	Eric Hollander; Belgium
Singles C6	Thomas Axelsson; Sweden	Mikael Westling; Sweden	Kyung Sik Kim; South Korea
Singles TT open	Claude Chedeau; France	Manfred Knabe; West Germany	Torben Pehrsson; Denmark
Singles TT2	Guy Tisserant; France	Herbert Velroyen; West Germany	Michel Gauducheau; France
Singles TT3	Thomas Kurfess; West Germany	Rainer Schmidt; West Germany	Stephan Welting; West Germany
Singles TT4	David Hope; Great Britain	Marc Piras; France	Klaus Mueller; West Germany
Singles TT5	Kwang Jin Kim; South Korea	Attila Szepesi; Hungary	Wolfgang Horsch; West Germany
Singles TT6	Kimmo Jokinen; Finland	Torben Pehrsson; Denmark	Jorgen Nilsson; Sweden
Singles TT7	Manfred Koller; West Germany	Svetislav Dimitrijevic; Yugoslavia	Frands Havaleschka; Denmark
Teams 1A	South Korea (KOR)	Switzerland (SUI); Hans Rosenast; Rolf Zumkehr	United States (USA); Sebastian DeFrancesco; Skip Wilkins
Teams 1B	West Germany (FRG)	Norway (NOR)	Austria (AUT)
Teams 1C	West Germany (FRG)	South Korea (KOR)	Belgium (BEL)
Teams 2	Austria (AUT)	South Korea (KOR)	West Germany (FRG)
Teams 3	South Korea (KOR)	Austria (AUT)	Great Britain (GBR); Arnie Chan; Neil Robinson
Teams 4	West Germany (FRG)	South Korea (KOR)	Hong Kong (HKG)
Teams C5–C8	Sweden (SWE)	Belgium (BEL)	Ireland (IRL)
Teams TT2	France (FRA); Michel Gauducheau; Guy Tisserant	South Korea (KOR); Hyung Suk Choi; Tae Hyung Um	West Germany (FRG); Hans Jurgen Rehder; Herbert Velroyen
Teams TT5	West Germany (FRG); Wolfgang Horsch; Thomas Schmitt	France (FRA); Thierry Garofalo; Marc Piras	Hungary (HUN); Gyozo Kovacs; Attila Szepesi
Teams TT6	Netherlands (NED); Niels Rohof; Rein Zijda	Japan (JPN); Masaaki Kozakura; Shuzo Saiki	Hungary (HUN); Lajos Erdos; Karoly Majsai
Teams TT7	West Germany (FRG); Manfred Koller; Markus Vahle	Sweden (SWE); Jorgen Nilsson; Dennis Nyberg	Denmark (DEN); Frands Havaleschka; Torben Pehrsson

=== Women's events ===
Event	Gold	Silver	Bronze
Singles 2–4	Jennifer Johnson; United States	Gabriele Kirchmair; Austria	Christiane Weninger; West Germany
Singles 2	Elisabeth Bisquolm; Switzerland	Ruth Lamsbach; West Germany	Jolanda Paardekam; Netherlands
Singles 3	Christiane Weninger; West Germany	Jennifer Johnson; United States	Inger Lise Andersen; Norway
Singles 4	Terese Terranova; United States	Monika Sikora; West Germany	Hildegard Fetz; Austria
Singles TT open	Xiaoling Zhang; China	Ingrid Borre; Belgium	Marie-Louise Andersson; Sweden
Singles TT6	Bernadette Darvand; France	Marie-Louise Andersson; Sweden	Cheng Yu; China
Singles TT7	Guiyun Hua; China	Marianne Baertelsen; Denmark	Birgit Bauer; West Germany
Teams 2	Switzerland (SUI); Christiane Droux; Elisabeth Mettler-Kiener	Great Britain (GBR); Val Beck; Anne Peskey	West Germany (FRG)
Teams 4	United States (USA)	West Germany (FRG)	Austria (AUT)
Teams TT6	China (CHN)	France (FRA)	Sweden (SWE)
