= Archery at the 1988 Summer Paralympics – Men's double FITA round 2-6 =

Men's double FITA round 2-6 at the VIII Paralympic Games
- Paralympic Archery
- Competitors: 22 from 12 nations

Medalists
1st place, gold medalist(s)		Michel Baudois	Switzerland
2nd place, silver medalist(s)		Hee Sook Kim	South Korea
3rd place, bronze medalist(s)		Udo Wolf	West Germany

The Men's double FITA round 2-6 was an archery competition in the 1988 Summer Paralympics.

Gold medalist was Swiss Michel Baudois who won his second medal after New York / Stoke Mandeville 1984.

== Results ==
Rank	Athlete	Points
1st place, gold medalist(s)	Michel Baudois (SUI)	2482
2nd place, silver medalist(s)	Hee Sook Kim (KOR)	2435
3rd place, bronze medalist(s)	Udo Wolf (FRG)	2390
4	Orazio Pizzorni (ITA)	2390
5	Ki Ki Jang (KOR)	2362
6	Guy Grun (BEL)	2356
7	Jappie Walstra (NED)	2344
8	Alec Denys (CAN)	2343
9	Shigetoshi Yoshida (JPN)	2328
10	Michael Harvey-Murray (GBR)	2319
11	Yoshihiro Inoue (JPN)	2299
12	Fabio Amadi (ITA)	2286
13	Giuliano Koten (ITA)	2284
14	Filip Bardoel (BEL)	2280
15	Ho Sung Kim (KOR)	2280
16	Robert Norvelle (USA)	2272
17	Roger Eriksson (SWE)	2258
18	Giuseppe Gabelli (ITA)	2255
19	Ping Sun Wong (HKG)	2249
20	Michio Okanishi (JPN)	2236
21	Joseph Grejdus (USA)	2233
22	Junji Uchiyama (JPN)	2229
