= Goalball at the 1988 Summer Paralympics =

Goalball at the VIII Paralympic Games
- Paralympic Goalball
- Venue: Jamsil Indoor Arena

Paralympic symbol (1988-1994)

Goalball at the 1988 Summer Paralympics consisted of men's and women's team events.

== Medal summary ==
Event	Gold	Silver	Bronze
Men	Yugoslavia (YUG); Muhamed Arnautovic; Miroslav Jancic; Adam Kablar; Rajko Kopac; Dragan Sremcevic	United States (USA) Darryl Holden; Reni Jackson; Jeffrey May; George Morris; James Neppl; Jerry Windell	Egypt (EGY) Ahmed Mamoud Abouzeed; Hussein Mohamed Ahmed; Ahmed Mohamed Aween; El Said Mohamed El Said; Bekhit Gad; Mohamed Mohamed Sherief
Women	Denmark (DEN) Ella Andersen; Helle Brodersen; Kirste Christensen; Ann Howalt; Katja Hunersen; Lene Skov Jensen	United States (USA) Patricia Baxter; Donna Budeau; Angie Garlick; Karen Helmacy; Maureen Ryan; April Saunders	Canada (CAN) Patricia Campion; Lucy Greco; Danielle Lessard; Lisa McLeod; Dianne Robitaille; Helena Rooyakkers

== Men's tournament ==
15 men's teams competed.

=== Qualification ===
Group A

Team	W	L	D	PF	PA	PD
United States (USA)	5	1	1	14	5	+9
Yugoslavia (YUG)	5	1	1	10	5	+5
Canada (CAN)	4	0	3	22	13	+9
Italy (ITA)	4	0	3	14	9	+ 5
Bulgaria (BUL)	3	2	2	14	7	+7
Australia (AUS)	3	0	4	14	14	0
Denmark (DEN)	1	2	4	1	9	−8
South Korea (KOR)	0	0	7	5	32	–27

South Korea (KOR)	0 – 1	Denmark (DEN)

Canada (CAN)	1 – 3	Bulgaria (BUL)

United States (USA)	1 – 2	Yugoslavia (YUG)

Australia (AUS)	0 – 1	Italy (ITA)

Denmark (DEN)	0 – 0	Yugoslavia (YUG)

South Korea (KOR)	0 – 5	Bulgaria (BUL)

United States (USA)	3 – 2	Australia (AUS)

Canada (CAN)	3 – 2	Italy (ITA)

South Korea (KOR)	1 – 4	Yugoslavia (YUG)

Bulgaria (BUL)	2 – 3	Italy (ITA)

Denmark (DEN)	0 – 1	Australia (AUS)i

Canada (CAN)	1 – 2	United States (USA)

South Korea (KOR)	1 – 5	Italy (ITA)

Yugoslavia (YUG)	1 – 0	Australia (AUS)

Bulgaria (BUL)	0 – 0	United States (USA)

Denmark (DEN)	0 – 4	Canada (CAN)

South Korea (KOR)	2 – 4	Australia (AUS)

Italy (ITA)	0 – 1	United States (USA)

Yugoslavia (YUG)	1 – 0	Canada (CAN)

Bulgaria (BUL)	0 – 0	Denmark (DEN)

South Korea (KOR)	0 – 5	United States (USA)

Australia (AUS)	4 – 5	Canada (CAN)

Italy (ITA)	2 – 0	Denmark (DEN)

Yugoslavia (YUG)	0 – 2	Bulgaria (BUL)

South Korea (KOR)	1 – 8	Canada (CAN)

United States (USA)	2 – 0	Denmark (DEN)

Australia (AUS)	3 – 2	Bulgaria (BUL)

Italy (ITA)	1 – 2	Yugoslavia (YUG)

Group B

Team	W	L	D	PF	PA	PD
Hungary (HUN)	2	4	0	6	2	+4
Egypt (EGY)	2	4	0	2	0	+2
West Germany (FRG)	2	3	1	7	5	+2
Israel (ISR)	1	5	0	5	3	+2
Finland (FIN)	1	3	2	7	5	+2
Netherlands (NED)	0	1	5	0	12	–12
Iran (IRI)	0	0	6	0	6	-6

Hungary (HUN)	1 – 1	Israel (ISR)

West Germany (FRG)	4 – 0	Netherlands (NED)

Finland (FIN)	1 – 0	Iran (IRI)

Egypt (EGY)	1 – 0	Israel (ISR)

West Germany (FRG)	1 – 0	Iran (IRI)

Hungary (HUN)	1 – 1	Finland (FIN)

Netherlands (NED)	0 – 1	Egypt (EGY)

Egypt (EGY)	1 – 0	Finland (FIN)

Iran (IRI)	0 – 1	Netherlands (NED)

West Germany (FRG)	0 – 3	Hungary (HUN)

Israel (ISR)	1 – 1	Finland (FIN)

Netherlands (NED)	0 – 1	Hungary (HUN)

Egypt (EGY)	0 – 0	West Germany (FRG)

Iran (IRI)	0 – 1	Israel (ISR)

Finland (FIN)	1 – 2	West Germany (FRG)

Iran (IRI)	0 – 1	Egypt (EGY)

Israel (ISR)	2 – 0	Netherlands (NED)

Iran (IRI)	0 – 1	Hungary (HUN)

Israel (ISR)	1 – 1	West Germany (FRG)

Hungary (HUN)	0 – 0	Egypt (EGY)

Finland (FIN)	4 – 0	Netherlands (NED)

=== Classification rounds ===
Classification 11-12

Australia (AUS)	3 – 3 (6 – 5 a.e.t.)	Netherlands (NED)

Classification 9-10

Bulgaria (BUL)	1 – 1 (2 – 3 a.e.t)	Finland (FIN)

Classification 7-8

Italy (ITA)	0 – 1	Israel (ISR)

=== Final round ===
Semifinals

Yugoslavia (YUG)	1 – 0	Hungary (HUN)

Egypt (EGY)	0 – 0 (0 – 2 pen.)	United States (USA)

Bronze medal match

Egypt (EGY)	0 – 0 (2 – 1 pen.)	Hungary (HUN)

Gold medal match

United States (USA)	0 – 0 (0 – 2 a.e.t.)	Yugoslavia (YUG)

== Women's tournament ==
7 women's teams competed.

Preliminaries

Team	W	L	D	PF	PA	PD
United States (USA)	6	0	0	20	0	+20
Denmark (DEN)	3	2	1	15	3	+12
Canada (CAN)	3	1	2	11	9	+2
Netherlands (NED)	2	3	1	21	9	+12
West Germany (FRG)	2	2	2	20	10	+10
South Korea (KOR)	1	0	5	10	46	−36
Australia (AUS)	0	0	6	9	29	–20

Denmark (DEN)	1 – 1	Netherlands (NED)

West Germany (FRG)	6 – 2	Australia (AUS)

Canada (CAN)	0 – 2	United States (USA)

South Korea (KOR)	0 – 8	Denmark (DEN)

West Germany (FRG)	12 – 2	South Korea (KOR)

Canada (CAN)	2 – 2	Netherlands (NED)

United States (USA)	4 – 0	Australia (AUS)

Canada (CAN)	0 – 1	Denmark (DEN)

South Korea (KOR)	1 – 9	West Germany (FRG)

United States (USA)	7 – 0	South Korea (KOR)

Australia (AUS)	1 – 5	Netherlands (NED)

South Korea (KOR)	2 – 3	Canada (CAN)

United States (USA)	3 – 0	West Germany (FRG)

Australia (AUS)	0 – 4	Denmark (DEN)

Netherlands (NED)	12 – 1	South Korea (KOR)

Australia (AUS)	2 – 5	Canada (CAN)

South Korea (KOR)	0 – 6	United States (USA)

Netherlands (NED)	1 – 1	West Germany (FRG)

South Korea (KOR)	5 – 4	Australia (AUS)

Netherlands (NED)	0 – 3	United States (USA)

Denmark (DEN)	1 – 1	West Germany (FRG)

Denmark (DEN)	0 – 1	United States (USA)

West Germany (FRG)	0 – 1	Canada (CAN)

=== Final round ===
Semifinals

United States (USA)	4 – 0	Netherlands (NED)

Denmark (DEN)	3 – 2	Canada (CAN)

Bronze medal match

Netherlands (NED)	2 – 5	Canada (CAN)

Gold medal match

Denmark (DEN)	0 – 0 (3 – 1 pen.)	United States (USA)

== Controversy ==
The Iranian team chanted an aggressive "war cry" at the Israeli team and refused to play them. They were subsequently deemed to have committed a "gross misuse of the sporting platform for political aims" and were disqualified. Iranian team manager Asghar Dadkhan formally apologised the following day and stated that other Iranian athletes would comply with the regulations.
