= Athletics at the 1988 Summer Paralympics – Men's marathon 5–6 =

Men's marathon 5-6 at the VIII Paralympic Games
- Paralympic Athletics
- Competitors: 17 from 13 nations

Medalists
1st place, gold medalist(s)		Jonathon Puffenberger	United States
2nd place, silver medalist(s)		Tom Foran	United States
3rd place, bronze medalist(s)		Georg Schrattenecker	Austria

The Men's marathon 5-6 was a wheelchair marathon event in athletics at the 1988 Summer Paralympics. The race was won by Jonathon Puffenberger.

== Results ==
Place	Athlete	Time
1	Jon Puffenberger (USA)	1:53:39
2	Tom Foran (USA)	1:54:35
3	Georg Schrattenecker (AUT)	1:56:26
4	Satoshi Yamaguchi (JPN)	1:58:28
5	Rudi van den Abbeele (FRA)	1:58:29
6	Nezar Ahmad (KUW)	2:05:29
7	Teruo Nozaki (JPN)	2:06:26
8	Jose Manuel Rios (MEX)	2:07:23
9	Bong Ho Lee (KOR)	2:11:47
10	John Anderson (USA)	2:13:51
11	Peter Weidkamp (FRG)	2:17:07
12	Kevin Breen (IRL)	2:21:15
13	Derek Yzelman (SIN)	2:21:15
14	Adel Sultan (BRN)	2:23:43
15	Fung Sio Kam (MAC)	2:48:34
16	Ramiro Bermudez (COL)	3:02:02
17	Thanapal Sinniah (SIN)	3:33:56

== See also ==
- Marathon at the Paralympics
