= Powerlifting at the 1988 Summer Paralympics =

Powerlifting at the VIII Paralympic Games
- Paralympic Powerlifting
- Venue: Olympic Weightlifting Gymnasium

Paralympic symbol (1988-1994)

Powerlifting at the 1988 Summer Paralympics consisted of nine events.

== Medal table ==
Rank	Nation	Gold	Silver	Bronze	Total
1	France (FRA)	2	0	0	2
1	Poland (POL)	2	0	0	2
3	South Korea (KOR)	1	4	1	6
4	Great Britain (GBR)	1	1	1	3
5	United States (USA)	1	0	3	4
6	Finland (FIN)	1	0	1	2
6	Sweden (SWE)	1	0	1	2
8	Australia (AUS)	0	1	1	2
9	Canada (CAN)	0	1	0	1
9	Hungary (HUN)	0	1	0	1
9	Switzerland (SUI)	0	1	0	1
12	Norway (NOR)	0	0	1	1
Totals (12 entries)		9	9	9	27

== Medal summary ==
Event	Gold	Silver	Bronze
Men's 52 kg	Kari Ylijoki; Finland	Jae Youn Kim; South Korea	Raimo Aalto; Finland
Men's 56 kg	Sang Jin Yun; South Korea	Young Chung Cho; South Korea	Douglas McDonald; United States
Men's 67.5 kg coed	Michel Abalain; France	Daniel Grossenbacher; Switzerland	Mons Skjelvik; Norway
Men's 67.5 kg	Henryk Kohnke; Poland	Heon Cho Ji; South Korea	David Buterbaugh; United States
Men's 75 kg	Donald Deutsch; United States	Nicholas Slater; Great Britain	Myung Sun Shim; South Korea
Men's 82.5 kg	Miroslaw Maliszew; Poland	Michael Johnson; Canada	Lynn Whiteman; United States
Men's 90 kg	Bernard Barberet; France	Kyung Chung Choi; South Korea	Fred MacKenzi; Great Britain
Men's 100 kg	Arne Karlsson; Sweden	Matthew Pobjie; Australia	Michael Farrell; Australia
Men's +100 kg	Anthony Bishop; Great Britain	Istvan Nanasi; Hungary	Nils Karreberg; Sweden
