= Athletics at the 1988 Summer Paralympics – Men's marathon 4 =

Men's marathon 4 at the VIII Paralympic Games
- Paralympic Athletics
- Competitors: 17 from 11 nations

Medalists
1st place, gold medalist(s)		Jean-François Poitevin	France
2nd place, silver medalist(s)		Farid Amarouche	France
3rd place, bronze medalist(s)		Rafael Ibarra	United States

The Men's marathon 4 was a wheelchair marathon event in athletics at the 1988 Summer Paralympics. It was contested by seventeen athletes from eleven countries.

== Results ==
Place	Athlete	Time
1	Jean-François Poitevin (FRA)	1:40:18
2	Farid Amarouche (FRA)	1:45:46
3	Rafael Ibarra (USA)	1:50:21
4	Yukifumi Yamamoto (JPN)	1:50:50
5	Peter Trotter (AUS)	1:54:37
6	Laverne Achenbacher (USA)	1:58:27
7	Jeff Wiseman (AUS)	1:58:28
8	Yu Hee-sang (KOR)	1:59:44
9	Ryu Min-ho (KOR)	2:02:25
10	Ron Robillaro (CAN)	2:02:26
11	Yasuhiro Fujikawa (JPN)	2:05:35
12	Robert Courtney (USA)	2:09:58
13	Mike Bishop (GBR)	2:11:47
14	Tan Kian Meng (SIN)	2:13:42
15	Uriel Martinez (MEX)	2:13:51
16	Yiannakis Gavriel (CYP)	2:25:17
17	Daniel Boldo (PHI)	2:47:37

== See also ==
- Marathon at the Paralympics
