= Cycling at the 1988 Summer Paralympics =

Cycling at the VIII Paralympic Games
- Paralympic Cycling
- Venue: Tongillo Road Course
- Dates: 18 to 21 October

Paralympic symbol (1988-1994)

Cycling at the 1988 Summer Paralympics consisted of seven road cycling events for men.

== Medal table ==
Rank	Nation	Gold	Silver	Bronze	Total
1	South Korea (KOR)	2	3	2	7
2	Canada (CAN)	2	1	0	3
3	France (FRA)	2	0	1	3
4	Belgium (BEL)	1	1	1	3
5	United States (USA)	0	1	2	3
6	Czechoslovakia (TCH)	0	1	0	1
7	Norway (NOR)	0	0	1	1
Totals (7 entries)		7	7	7	21

== Medal summary ==
Event	Gold	Silver	Bronze
Bicycle 1500 m C5–6	Do Geol Kwak; South Korea	Jong Kil Kim; South Korea	Jung Yeol Lee; South Korea
Tricycle 1500 m C5–6	Halldor Bjarnason; Canada	Geert Couchez; Belgium	Michael McGilton; United States
Bicycle 3000 m C5–6	Jong Kil Kim; South Korea	Do Geol Kwak; South Korea	Jung Yeol Lee; South Korea
Tricycle 3000 m C5–6	Geert Couchez; Belgium	Halldor Bjarnason; Canada	Johnny Kviserud; Norway
50 km LC2	Tristan Mouric; France	Seung Yeol Lee; South Korea	PierAngelo Beltrami; United States
60 km LC3	Dean Dwyer; Canada	Josef Lachman; Czechoslovakia	Claude van Coillie; Belgium
70 km LC4	Francisco Trujillo; France	James Henry; United States	Pascal Thevenon; France
