= Terese Terranova =

American para table tennis player

Personal information
- Born: May 21, 1947 (age 79) North Bergen, New Jersey

Sport
- Country: United States
- Sport: Para table tennis
- Disability: Paraplegia
- Disability class: C4
- Club: Broward Table Tennis Club
Medal record
Para table tennis
Representing United States
Paralympic Games
Gold medal – first place	1988 Seoul	Women's singles C4
Gold medal – first place	1988 Seoul	Women's team C4
Bronze medal – third place	1992 Barcelona	Women's open singles
Bronze medal – third place	1996 Atlanta	Women's teams C3-5
World Championships
Bronze medal – third place	1990 Assen	Women's singles C5
Bronze medal – third place	1990 Assen	Women's teams C4-5
Bronze medal – third place	1998 Paris	Women's singles C5
Parapan American Games
Silver medal – second place	1999 Mexico City	Women's teams C4-5
Bronze medal – third place	1999 Mexico City	Women's singles C5

Terese Terranova (born May 21, 1947) is a retired American para table tennis player. She became disabled after being involved in a car accident where she was crushed against a concrete wall by a car and resulted in her back being broken in five separate places.

Born in North Bergen, New Jersey, Terranova was raised in Northvale, New Jersey, where she attended Northern Valley Regional High School at Old Tappan. Terranova has participated in four Paralympic Games and has won team titles along with Jennifer Johnson in both world, Paralympic and Parapan events. She returned to competition in 2019 to participate in the 2019 Parapan American Games in Lima, Peru where she failed to advance into the later stages of the competition.
