= Jacqueline Nannenberg =

Dutch Paralympic swimmer

Sport
- Country: Netherlands
- Sport: Paralympic swimming
Medal record
Representing Netherlands
Paralympic swimming
Paralympic Games
Gold medal – first place	1988 Seoul	100m backstroke A2
Gold medal – first place	1992 Barcelona	100m backstroke S9
Gold medal – first place	1996 Atlanta	100m backstroke S9
Silver medal – second place	1988 Seoul	200m individual medley A2
Bronze medal – third place	1988 Seoul	100m butterfly A2

Jacqueline Nannenberg is a Dutch Paralympic swimmer. She represented the Netherlands at the 1988 Summer Paralympics, at the 1992 Summer Paralympics and at the 1996 Summer Paralympics.

In total, she won three gold medals, one silver medal and one bronze medal. She won a gold medal on each occasion. In 1988, she also won a silver and a bronze medal.
