= Georg Schrattenecker =

Austrian Paralympic athlete

Sport
- Country: Austria
- Sport: Para-athletics
Medal record
Paralympic Games
Bronze medal – third place	1988 Seoul	Marathon 5–6

Georg Schrattenecker is a former Austrian Paralympic athlete. He represented Austria at the 1988 Summer Paralympics held in Seoul, South Korea and he won the bronze medal in the men's marathon 5–6 event. He also competed at the 1992 Summer Paralympics and the 1996 Summer Paralympics.

He also won the bronze medal in the men's wheelchair race at the 1995 London Marathon in London, United Kingdom.
