= Wolfgang Horsch =

German para table tennis player

Sport
- Country: West Germany
- Sport: Para table tennis
Medal record
Para table tennis
Representing West Germany
Paralympic Games
Gold medal – first place	1988 Seoul	Men's teams TT-5
Bronze medal – third place	1988 Seoul	Men's singles TT-5

Wolfgang Horsch is a German para table tennis player. He represented West Germany at the Summer Paralympics in 1988 and represented Germany in 1992. In total, he won one gold medal and one bronze medal.
