= Arkadiusz Pawłowski =

Polish Paralympic swimmer

Personal information
- Born: 28 August 1951 (age 74) Warsaw, Poland

Sport
- Country: Poland
- Sport: Para Swimming
Medal record
Paralympic swimming
Representing Poland
Paralympic Games
Gold medal – first place	1980 Arnhem	25m butterfly 3
Gold medal – first place	1980 Arnhem	4x25m individual medley 3
Gold medal – first place	1984 Stoke Mandeville/New York	25m butterfly 3
Gold medal – first place	1984 Stoke Mandeville/New York	50m freestyle 3
Gold medal – first place	1984 Stoke Mandeville/New York	50m breaststroke 3
Gold medal – first place	1984 Stoke Mandeville/New York	4x25m individual medley 3
Gold medal – first place	1988 Seoul	25m butterfly 3
Gold medal – first place	1988 Seoul	100m individual medley 3
Gold medal – first place	1996 Atlanta	200m individual medley SM5
Silver medal – second place	1980 Arnhem	50m freestyle 3
Silver medal – second place	1988 Seoul	50m breaststroke 3
Silver medal – second place	1988 Seoul	50m freestyle 3
Bronze medal – third place	1980 Arnhem	50m breaststroke 3
Bronze medal – third place	1988 Seoul	50m backstroke 3
Bronze medal – third place	1988 Seoul	200m freestyle 3
Bronze medal – third place	1992 Barcelona	100m breaststroke SB4
Bronze medal – third place	2000 Sydney	200m individual medley SM5

Arkadiusz Pawłowski (born 25 April 1956) is a former Polish paralympic swimmer who won fifteen medals at the Summer Paralympics.

== See also ==
- List of multiple Paralympic gold medalists
