= Miri Sisso =

Israeli Paralympic swimmer

Personal information
- Native name: מירי סיסו
- Nationality: Israel

Sport
- Sport: Swimming
Medal record
Event / 1st / 2nd / 3rd; Paralympic Games / 1 / 0 / 2
Women's para swimming
Representing Israel
Paralympic Games
Gold medal – first place	1988 Seoul	100m breaststroke C4
Bronze medal – third place	1984 Stoke Mandeville New York	100m backstroke C4
Bronze medal – third place	1988 Seoul	100m freestyle C4

Miri Sisso (Hebrew: מירי סיסו) is a former Israeli Paralympic swimmer.

== Biography ==
Sisso was the oldest of four children and grew up in Netanya. She was born with Cerebral palsy and from the age of ten joined the Israel ParaSport Center.

At the 1984 Summer Paralympics she competed in para athletics in discus throw and in shot put and in para swimming in three tournaments, winning her first bronze medal in 100m backstroke. Sisso later focused on swimming and competed at the 1988 Summer Paralympics and 1992 Summer Paralympics. In 1988 she won a gold medal and her second bronze medal for 100m breaststroke and freestyle, respectively.

Sisso is a certified special education teacher.
