= China at the 1988 Summer Paralympics =

- IPC code: CHN
- NPC: China Administration of Sports for Persons with Disabilities
- Website: www.caspd.org.cn

in Seoul
- Competitors: 43 in 4 sports
- Medals Ranked 15th: Gold 16 Silver 17 Bronze 8 Total 41

Summer Paralympics appearances (overview)
- 1984; 1988; 1992; 1996; 2000; 2004; 2008; 2012; 2016; 2020; 2024

China competed at the 1988 Summer Paralympics, held in Seoul, South Korea. The country was represented by 43 athletes competing in four sports: athletics, swimming, table tennis and shooting. Chinese competitors won 41 medals, of which 16 gold, and finished in fifteenth place on the medal table.

== Medalists ==
Medal	Name	Sport	Event
Gold	Zhen Yu Yao	Athletics	Men's discus throw A4/A9
Gold	Zhao Jihong	Athletics	Women's 100m B3
Gold	Zhao Jihong	Athletics	Women's 400m B3
Gold	Zhang Wei	Shooting	Women's air pistol 2-6
Gold	Liu Zebing	Swimming	Men's 100m freestyle A6
Gold	Liu Guiping	Swimming	Men's 400m freestyle A8
Gold	Cai Zusheng	Swimming	Men's 100m backstroke A6
Gold	Yan Hu Wu	Swimming	Men's 100m breaststroke A1
Gold	Cai Zusheng	Swimming	Men's 100m breaststroke A6
Gold	Liu Zebing	Swimming	Men's 100m butterfly A6
Gold	Liu Guiping	Swimming	Men's 100m butterfly A8
Gold	Yan Hu Wu	Swimming	Men's 200m individual medley A1
Gold	Cai Zusheng	Swimming	Men's 200m individual medley A6
Gold	Zhang Xiaoling	Table tennis	Women's singles TT open
Gold	Hua Guiyun	Table tennis	Women's singles TT7
Gold	Women's team	Table tennis	Women's teams TT6
Silver	Chang Ting Sun; Qin Zhongxing; Qiu Xuewen; Yang Shaomin	Athletics	Men's 4x100m relay A2/A4-7
Silver	Chang Ting Sun; Qin Zhongxing; Qiu Xuewen; Wang Huiyun	Athletics	Men's 4x400m relay A2/A4-7
Silver	Yang Shaomin	Athletics	Men's high jump A6/A8-9/L6
Silver	Chang Ting Sun	Athletics	Men's long jump A4/A9
Silver	Yang Shaomin	Athletics	Men's long jump A6/A8-9/L6
Silver	Yang Shaomin	Athletics	Men's triple jump A6/A8-9/L6
Silver	Zhao Bin	Athletics	Men's discus throw A3/A9
Silver	Zhao Jihong	Athletics	Women's long jump B3
Silver	Song Meijie	Athletics	Women's discus throw B1
Silver	Song Meijie	Athletics	Women's javelin throw B1
Silver	Yan Hu Wu	Swimming	Men's 100m freestyle A1
Silver	Liu Zebing	Swimming	Men's 100m backstroke A6
Silver	Liu Wenhua	Swimming	Men's 100m breaststroke A1
Silver	Zhang Jiaman	Swimming	Men's 100m breaststroke A4
Silver	Liu Zebing	Swimming	Men's 100m breaststroke A6
Silver	Liu Wenhua	Swimming	Men's 200m individual medley A1
Silver	Liu Guiping	Swimming	Men's 200m individual medley A8
Bronze	Qiu Xuewen	Athletics	Men's 100m A5/A7
Bronze	Qiu Xuewen	Athletics	Men's 200m A5/A7
Bronze	Qin Zhongxing	Athletics	Men's triple jump A6/A8-9/L6
Bronze	Chang Ting Sun	Athletics	Men's javelin throw A4/A9
Bronze	Zhao Bin	Athletics	Men's shot put A3/A9
Bronze	Huang Yuefu	Swimming	Men's 50m breaststroke B1
Bronze	Liu Zebing	Swimming	Men's 200m individual medley A6
Bronze	Cheng Yu	Table tennis	Women's singles TT6

== See also ==
- China at the Paralympics
- China at the 1988 Summer Olympics
- Sports in China
