= Vadim Kalmykov =

Soviet paralympic athlete

Medal record

Track and field (B2)

Representing the Soviet Union

Paralympic Games
Gold medal – first place	1988 Seoul	high jump
Gold medal – first place	1988 Seoul	long jump
Gold medal – first place	1988 Seoul	pentathlon
Gold medal – first place	1988 Seoul	triple jump

Representing Ukraine

Track and field (F12)

Paralympic Games
Bronze medal – third place	2000 Sydney	pentathlon

Vadim Kalmykov is a former Soviet and Ukrainian track and field athlete.

He represented the Soviet Union at the 1988 Summer Paralympics in Seoul, competing in four events in track and field and winning gold in all four. He was the USSR's most successful athlete at the 1988 Games. As this was the Soviet Union's first and only participation at the Summer Paralympic Games, he is the most successful Soviet Paralympian ever. Like all Soviet athletes, he competed in events for the visually impaired; the "B2" category denotes severe visual impairment, falling short of total blindness.

After a twelve-year absence, he returned just once to the Games, joining Ukraine's delegation to the 2000 Summer Paralympics in Sydney. He placed sixth in the triple jump, but won the bronze medal in the pentathlon.
