= Smadar Tzur =

Israeli Paralympic swimmer

Personal information
- Native name: סמדר צור

Sport
- Country: Israel
- Sport: Para swimming Wheelchair basketball
Medal record
Event / 1st / 2nd / 3rd; Paralympic Games / 1 / 1 / 1
Representing Israel
Paralympic swimming
Gold medal – first place	1988 Seoul	100 m Butterfly A2
Bronze medal – third place	1988 Seoul	100 m Breaststroke A2
Wheelchair basketball
Silver medal – second place	1984 Stoke Mandeville	Women's tournament

Smadar Tzur (Hebrew: סמדר צור) is a former Israeli Paralympic swimmer and wheelchair basketball player.

Tzur grew up in Ma'agan Michael and in 1977 was severely injured by a motorboat, causing one of her legs to be amputated. She was active in ILAN's disabled sports programs and was a member of the wheelchair basketball teams in Jerusalem and Haifa.

Tzur participated in the 1984 Summer Paralympics as a member of the national women's wheelchair basketball team.

At the 1988 Summer Paralympics Tzur competed in wheelchair basketball and in para swimming. She won a gold medal in the Women's 100 m Butterfly A2 tournament and a bronze medal in the Women's 100 m Breaststroke A2 tournament.
