= Brent Gibson =

New Zealand Paralympian

Sport
- Country: New Zealand
- Sport: Swimming
Medal record
Men's para swimming
Representing New Zealand
Paralympic Games
Gold medal – first place	1988 Seoul	200 m freestyle 3
Bronze medal – third place	1988 Seoul	100 m individual medley 3
Bronze medal – third place	1988 Seoul	50 m freestyle 3

Brent Gibson is a New Zealand para-swimmer. At the 1988 Summer Paralympics, he won a gold medal in the 200m Freestyle 3, and bronze medals in the 100m Individual Medley 3 and 50m Freestyle 3.
