= Boaz Avhar =

Israeli Paralympic swimmer

Personal information
- Native name: בועז אבהר
- Nationality: Israel

Sport
- Sport: Swimming
Medal record
Event / 1st / 2nd / 3rd; Paralympic Games / 0 / 0 / 3
Men's para swimming
Representing Israel
Paralympic Games
Bronze medal – third place	1988 Seoul	100m freestyle C3
Bronze medal – third place	1988 Seoul	100m backstroke C3
Bronze medal – third place	1988 Seoul	200m backstroke C3

Boaz Avhar (Hebrew: בועז אבהר) is a former Israeli Paralympic swimmer.

== Biography ==
Avhar has cerebral palsy.

At the 1988 Summer Paralympics he won bronze medals in all three tournaments he took part in: 100 meters freestyle, 100 meters backstroke and 200 meters backstroke in the C3 category. He returned to the 1992 Summer Paralympics and competed in five tournaments but only reached to the final in one event and failed to win any medals.

Avhar worked at Bezeq for 31 years and was later licensed in coaching and coordinates two social clubs for the disabled: a club in Holon for teenagers and a club in Tel Aviv for adults. He is married and has two children.

== See also ==
- Israel at the Paralympics
