= Ritva Nikkilä =

Finnish Paralympic swimmer

Personal information
- Born: 1961 (age 64–65) Savitaipale, Finland

Sport
- Country: Finland
- Sport: Paralympic swimming
- Disability: Dysmelia
- Disability class: S5
- Retired: 1993
Medal record
Paralympic swimming
Representing Finland
Paralympic Games
Gold medal – first place	1988 Seoul	50m backstroke L2
Silver medal – second place	1988 Seoul	100m freestyle L2
Silver medal – second place	1992 Barcelona	50m backstroke S5
Bronze medal – third place	1988 Seoul	50m freestyle L2

Ritva Nikkilä (born 1961) is a Finnish retired Paralympic swimmer who competed at international swimming competitions. She was a Paralympic champion and competed at the 1988 and 1992 Summer Paralympics.

== Personal life ==
Nikkilä was born in 1961 in a small family farm in Savitaipale, South Karelia, she was the middle child of five children: she grew up with four brothers, two older and two younger. She was born with two fingers on each hand and her right leg is shorter than her left leg. She underwent twenty corrective surgeries on her lower and upper limbs to improve mobility, she had a prosthetic limb when she was three years old. While living in a house in the countryside, she followed her brothers' footsteps and they all learned to swim at a nearby beach, Ritva became very attached to swimming from a young age. As well as swimming, she learned to knit and crochet at school.

=== Swimming career ===
Nikkilä began to swim competitively at the age of nineteen, she participated at the 1988 Summer Paralympics in her twenties and won a gold medal in the backstroke and silver and bronze medals in the freestyle. She then won a silver medal at the 1992 Summer Paralympics, after which she stopped competitive swimming to focus on studying social care at University of Kuopio.
