= Cheng Yu (disambiguation) =

Cheng Yu (程昱; Chéng Yù, 141–220) was an advisor to the warlord Cao Cao during the late Han dynasty.

Cheng Yu or Chengyu may also refer to:

- Chengyu (simplified Chinese: 成语; traditional Chinese: 成語), a type of idiomatic expression in the Chinese language
- Chengdu-Chongqing dialect or Cheng-Yu dialect
  - These characters (成渝) can also refer to Chengdu-Chongqing economic zone (which include other cities in the area)
- Cheng Yu (musician) (程玉; Chéng Yù), Chinese pipa player based in England
- Cheng Yu (table tennis) (程瑜; Chéng Yú, born c. 1952), Chinese para table tennis player
- Winnie Yu (Chinese: 俞琤; pinyin: Yú Chēng; born 1954), Hong Kong radio personality

== See also ==
- Zheng Yu (born 1996), Chinese badminton player
