= Budin =

Budin may refer to:

- Buda, a part of Budapest, Hungary
- Budin Eyalet, a Central European territory of the Ottoman Empire
- Budin (surname), a family name
