= Sebastian DeFrancesco =

American paralympic athlete and table tennis player

Personal information
- Born: Sebastian Anthony DeFrancesco; October 15, 1953 Brooklyn, New York, U.S.
- Died: August 29, 2023 (aged 69) Palo Alto, California, U.S.
- Education: University of Massachusetts; Cabrillo College

Sport
- Country: United States
- Sport: Para-athletics; Table tennis
- Disability: Quadriplegic
- Disability class: C1; C5/6
Medal record
Representing United States
Paralympic Games
Para-athletics
Bronze medal – third place	1984 Stoke Mandeville / New York	Men's slalom 1A
Table tennis
Bronze medal – third place	1988 Seoul	Men's teams 1A

Sebastian Anthony DeFrancesco (October 15, 1953 – August 29, 2023) was an American paralympic athlete and table tennis player. He competed at the 1984 and 1988 Summer Paralympics.

== Life and career ==
DeFrancesco was born in Brooklyn, New York, the son of Joseph DeFrancesco and Marion Appuliese. He attended the University of Massachusetts and Cabrillo College. He served in the United States Army Special Forces during the Vietnam War. During his military service, he was injured in a military jeep crash in Italy, which left his legs and torso paralyzed.

DeFrancesco competed at the 1984 Summer Paralympics, winning the bronze medal in the men's slalom 1A event in athletics. He also competed at the 1988 Summer Paralympics, winning the bronze medal in the men's teams 1A event in table tennis. After competing at the Paralympics, he worked as a sports and recreation director for the Disabled New England Paralyzed Association in 1995.

== Death ==
DeFrancesco died on August 29, 2023, in Palo Alto, California, at the age of 69.
