= Norway at the 1988 Summer Paralympics =

- IPC code: NOR
- NPC: Norwegian Olympic and Paralympic Committee and Confederation of Sports
- Website: www.idrett.no (in Norwegian)

in Seoul
- Competitors: 34 in 6 sports
- Medals Ranked 23rd: Gold 11 Silver 11 Bronze 15 Total 37

Summer Paralympics appearances (overview)
- 1960; 1964; 1968; 1972; 1976; 1980; 1984; 1988; 1992; 1996; 2000; 2004; 2008; 2012; 2016; 2020; 2024

Norway competed at the 1988 Summer Paralympics in Seoul, South Korea. 34 competitors from Norway won 36 medals including 11 gold, 11 silver and 14 bronze and finished 23rd in the medal table.

== Medalists ==
Medal	Name	Sport	Event
Gold	Joerund Gaasemyr	Athletics	Men's marathon B1
Gold	Siw Kristin Vestengen	Athletics	Women's 200m C7
Gold	Siw Kristin Vestengen	Athletics	Women's 400m C7
Gold	Mona Ullmann	Athletics	Women's javelin throw B2
Gold	Haakon Henne	Swimming	Men's 100m freestyle C3
Gold	Haakon Henne	Swimming	Men's 100m backstroke C3
Gold	Noel Pedersen	Swimming	Men's 50m breaststroke B3
Gold	Noel Pedersen	Swimming	Men's 100m breaststroke B3
Gold	Noel Pedersen	Swimming	Men's 200m breaststroke B3
Gold	Erling Trondsen	Swimming	Men's 100m butterfly L4
Gold	Erling Trondsen	Swimming	Men's 200m individual medley L4
Silver	Terje Loevaas	Athletics	Men's 1500m B1
Silver	Tofiri Kibuuka	Athletics	Men's 5000m B1
Silver	Ragnar Anundsen	Athletics	Men's discus throw C4
Silver	Ragnar Anundsen	Athletics	Men's shot put C4
Silver	Siw Kristin Vestengen	Athletics	Women's 100m C7
Silver	Mona Ullmann	Athletics	Women's shot put B2
Silver	Mona Ullmann	Athletics	Women's pentathlon B2
Silver	Erling Trondsen	Swimming	Men's 100m freestyle L4
Silver	Noel Pedersen	Swimming	Men's 100m backstroke B3
Silver	Noel Pedersen	Swimming	Men's 200m individual medley B3
Silver	Men's team	Table tennis	Men's teams 1B
Bronze	Tofiri Kibuuka	Athletics	Men's 1500m B1
Bronze	Terje Loevaas	Athletics	Men's 5000m B1
Bronze	Ragnar Anundsen	Athletics	Men's javelin throw C4
Bronze	Knut Amundsen	Athletics	Men's javelin throw C7
Bronze	Mona Ullmann	Athletics	Women's long jump B2
Bronze	Birte Oddny Larsen	Athletics	Women's shot put C7
Bronze	Johnny Kviserud	Cycling	Men's tricycle 3000m C5-6
Bronze	Mons Skjelvik	Powerlifting	Men's 67.5kg coed
Bronze	Erling Trondsen	Swimming	Men's 100m breaststroke L4
Bronze	Noel Pedersen	Swimming	Men's 400m individual medley B3
Bronze	Maj Berger Sether	Swimming	Women's 100m freestyle L4
Bronze	Maj Berger Sether	Swimming	Women's 100m backstroke L4
Bronze	Svein Bjornar Simensen	Table tennis	Men's singles 1B
Bronze	Inger Lise Andersen	Table tennis	Women's singles 3
Bronze	Knut Olav Brathen; Erik Halvorsen; Ole Hodnemyr; Geir Kjolsrud; Geir Kvarsvik; Kaare Lyse; Lars Moller Jensen; Oeivind Olsen; Per Willy Ormestad; Gaute Rostrup	Volleyball	Men's sitting

== See also ==
- Norway at the Paralympics
- Norway at the 1988 Summer Olympics
