= 1988 Summer Paralympics medal table =

1988 Summer Paralympics medals
- Location: Seoul South Korea

Highlights
- Most gold medals: United States (91)
- Most total medals: United States (269)
- Medalling NPCs: 49

The 1988 Summer Paralympics medal table is a list of National Paralympic Committees (NPCs) ranked by the number of gold medals won by their athletes during the 1988 Summer Paralympics, held in Seoul, South Korea, from October 15 to 24, 1988. Medalling 49 NPCs are at least one medal

== Medal table ==
The ranking in this table is based on information provided by the International Paralympic Committee (IPC) and is consistent with IPC convention in its published medal tables. By default, the table is ordered by the number of gold medals the athletes from a nation have won (in this context, a "nation" is an entity represented by a National Paralympic Committee). The number of silver medals is taken into consideration next and then the number of bronze medals. If nations are still tied, equal ranking is given and they are listed alphabetically by IPC country code.

To sort this table by nation, total medal count, or any other column, click on the icon next to the column title.

* Host nation (South Korea)

Rank	Nation	Gold	Silver	Bronze	Total
1	United States	91	90	88	269
2	West Germany	76	65	52	193
3	Great Britain	65	65	54	184
4	Canada	55	42	55	152
5	France	46	44	50	140
6	Sweden	42	38	23	103
7	South Korea*	40	35	19	94
8	Netherlands	30	24	29	83
9	Australia	23	34	38	95
10	Poland	23	25	33	81
11	Denmark	23	19	22	64
12	Soviet Union	21	20	15	56
13	Spain	18	13	12	43
14	Japan	17	12	17	46
15	China	16	17	8	41
16	Italy	16	15	27	58
17	Belgium	15	18	8	41
18	Israel	15	14	16	45
19	Ireland	13	11	18	42
20	Austria	13	7	15	35
21	Switzerland	12	12	11	35
22	Finland	11	23	16	50
23	Norway	11	11	15	37
24	Mexico	8	9	7	24
25	Kuwait	5	5	7	17
26	Brazil	4	9	14	27
27	Yugoslavia	4	4	11	19
28	Iran	4	1	3	8
29	Portugal	3	5	6	14
30	New Zealand	2	4	11	17
31	Iceland	2	2	7	11
32	Bulgaria	2	1	0	3
33	Jamaica	1	4	3	8
34	Egypt	1	3	3	7
34	Faroe Islands	1	3	3	7
36	Puerto Rico	1	2	0	3
37	Bahrain	1	1	1	3
38	Guatemala	1	0	0	1
39	Argentina	0	7	2	9
40	Hungary	0	5	7	12
41	Kenya	0	4	1	5
42	Hong Kong	0	2	7	9
43	Indonesia	0	2	0	2
44	Greece	0	1	3	4
45	Czechoslovakia	0	1	0	1
45	Thailand	0	1	0	1
47	Tunisia	0	0	2	2
48	Malaysia	0	0	1	1
48	Morocco	0	0	1	1
Totals (49 entries)		732	730	741	2,203

== See also ==
- 1988 Summer Olympics medal table
