= Tunisia at the 1988 Summer Paralympics =

- IPC code: TUN
- NPC: Tunisian Paralympic Committee

in Seoul
- Competitors: 1
- Medals Ranked 47th: Gold 0 Silver 0 Bronze 2 Total 2

Summer Paralympics appearances (overview)
- 1988; 1992; 1996; 2000; 2004; 2008; 2012; 2016; 2020; 2024

Tunisia competed at the 1988 Summer Paralympics in Seoul, South Korea. 1 competitor from Tunisia won a two bronze medals and finished 47th medal table.

== See also ==
- Tunisia at the Paralympics
- Tunisia at the 1988 Summer Olympics
