= Timothy McIsaac =

Canadian Paralympic swimmer

Personal information
- Nickname: Tim
- Born: 10 January 1959 (age 67) Winnipeg, Manitoba, Canada

Sport
- Country: Canada
- Sport: Paralympic swimming
- Disability: Blindness
- Disability class: A, B1
- Club: St. James Seals Swim Club (1976-1992)
- Coached by: Wilf and Audrey Strom
- Retired: 1992
Medal record
Men's paralympic swimming
Representing Canada
Paralympic Games
Gold medal – first place	1976 Toronto	4x100m medley A
Silver medal – second place	1976 Toronto	100m butterfly A
Silver medal – second place	1976 Toronto	400m ind. medley A
Bronze medal – third place	1976 Toronto	100m backstroke A
Bronze medal – third place	1976 Toronto	100m freestyle A
Gold medal – first place	1980 Arnhem	100m breaststroke A
Gold medal – first place	1980 Arnhem	100m butterfly
Gold medal – first place	1980 Arnhem	200m ind. medley A
Gold medal – first place	1980 Arnhem	400m ind. medley A
Gold medal – first place	1984 Stoke Mandeville/ New York	400m breaststroke B1
Gold medal – first place	1984 Stoke Mandeville/ New York	400m ind. medley B1
Silver medal – second place	1984 Stoke Mandeville/ New York	100m breaststroke B1
Gold medal – first place	1988 Seoul	100m backstroke B1
Gold medal – first place	1988 Seoul	100m butterfly B1
Gold medal – first place	1988 Seoul	200m ind. medley B1
Bronze medal – third place	1988 Seoul	400m freestyle B1

Timothy "Tim" McIsaac (born 10 January 1959) is a retired Canadian Paralympic swimmer, who was born blind. He was one of the first blind swimmers to do a tumble turn in an international competition. He began swimming at the Ross MacDonald School for the Blind in Brantford, Ontario.

== Biography ==
McIsaac was born in Winnipeg, Manitoba and has been blind since birth. When he was six years old, he would spend ten months of every year living in residence at the school and was far away from home. His father kept in contact with him whenever he attended business trips in Toronto or McIsaac would telephone his family every other week.

== Swimming career ==
=== Swimming motivation ===
McIsaac started swimming when he was aged 13: his determination to start focusing on swimming was when he was involved in a car accident in September 1973 outside of his parents' house. He suffered from fractures in both of his legs and a compound fracture on his right arm.

=== Start of his swimming career ===
McIsaac first competed in a major competition in 1975 aged sixteen at the Ontario Games for the Physically Disabled held in Cambridge. He had only been swimming for three years but he won five gold medals at his first Games.

== Contributions ==
He has been awarded the Viscount Alexander Award for Junior Male Athlete of the Year in 1976 after his success at the 1976 Summer Paralympics. He won another title in 1982 for being the Athlete of the Year in Manitoba and was honored in Manitoba Sports Hall of Fame in 2000. McIssac was additional inducted into the Canadian Paralympic Committee Hall of Fame in 2013.

As well as being the most decorated Canadian Paralympian and the first blind swimmer to the tumble turn, McIsaac is a legendary role model and his success, along with teammate Michael Edgson, they helped to build the paths of future star swimmers like Donovan Tildesley, Valerie Grand'Maison and Amber Thomas who are all blind swimmers.
