= Pilar Javaloyas =

Spanish paralympic athlete

Personal information
- Born: Valencia, Spain

Sport
- Country: Spain
- Sport: Paralympic swimming
Medal record
Paralympic swimming
Representing Spain
Paralympic Games
Gold medal – first place	1988 Seoul	100m backstroke 6
Gold medal – first place	1988 Seoul	100m butterfly 6
Silver medal – second place	1980 Arnhem	100m freestyle 6
Silver medal – second place	1980 Arnhem	100m backstroke 6
Silver medal – second place	1980 Arnhem	100m breaststroke 6
Silver medal – second place	1980 Arnhem	100m butterfly 6
Silver medal – second place	1980 Arnhem	4x50m individual medley 6
Silver medal – second place	1984 Stoke Mandeville/New York	100m backstroke L5
Bronze medal – third place	1984 Stoke Mandeville/New York	100m butterfly L5
Bronze medal – third place	1984 Stoke Mandeville/New York	200m individual medley L5
Bronze medal – third place	1988 Seoul	400m freestyle 6

Pilar Javaloyas is a Spanish paralympic athlete who competed in Para swimming. She won eleven medals at the 1980, 1984, and 1988 Summer Paralympics.

== Career ==
At the 1980 Summer Paralympics, she won silver medals in 100 meters breaststroke 6, 100 meters backstroke 6, 100 meters freestyle 6, 100 meters butterfly 6, and 200 individual medley 6.

At the 1984 Summer Paralympics, she won a silver medal 100 meters backstroke L5, and bronze medals in 100 meters butterfly L5, and 200 meters individual medley L5.

At the 1988 Summer Paralympics, in Seoul, she won gold medals, in 100 meters backstroke 6, 100 meters butterfly 6, and a bronze medal 400 meters freestyle 6.
