= Ángel Marín =

Spanish Paralympic athlete

Medal record

Paralympic athletics

Representing Spain

Paralympic Games
Gold medal – first place	1988 Seoul	800 metres - A6A8A9L4
Gold medal – first place	1988 Seoul	1500 metres - A6A8A9L4
Gold medal – first place	1988 Seoul	5000 metres - A6A8A9L4
Silver medal – second place	1992 Barcelona	10000 metres - TS4
Bronze medal – third place	1992 Barcelona	5000 metres - TS4

Ángel Marín is a paralympic athlete from Spain competing mainly in category TS4 distance events.

Marín competed in three events at the 1988 Summer Paralympics: the men's 800m, 1500m, and 5000m, winning gold in all three events and setting new world records in the 1500m and 5000m. Unfortunately at the 1992 Summer Paralympics in his home country, he did not do as well. He finished sixth in the 800m, fifth in the 1500m, and third in the 5000m, he also won a silver in the 10,000m. All four of these races were won by compatriot Javier Conde, who broke the world record in the 1500m, 5000m, and 10,000m.
