= Esther Eroles =

Spanish swimmer

Personal information
- Full name: Esther Eroles Baena

Sport
- Country: Spain
- Sport: Paralympic swimming
Medal record
Paralympic swimming
Representing Spain
Paralympic Games
Silver medal – second place	1988 Seoul	100m freestyle 5
Silver medal – second place	1988 Seoul	100m backstroke 5
Silver medal – second place	1988 Seoul	100m breaststroke 5
Silver medal – second place	1988 Seoul	400m freestyle 5
World Championships
Gold medal – first place	1994 Malta	4×100m medley S7-10
Bronze medal – third place	1994 Malta	100m butterfly S9

Esther Eroles Baena is a Spanish Paralympic swimmer. She won four silver medals at the 1988 Summer Paralympics in Seoul.

== Career ==
At the 1988 Summer Paralympics in Seoul, she won silver medals in 100 meters breaststroke 5, 100 meters backstroke 5, 100 meters freestyle 5, and 400 meters freestyle 5.

At the 1994 IPC Swimming World Championships, in Malta, she won a gold medal in Women's 4×100 meters Medley S7-10, and bronze medal in Women's 100 meters Butterfly S9.

She worked with Fundación Johan Cruyff.
