= Erling Trondsen =

Norwegian Paralympic swimmer

Personal information
- Born: 28 December 1959 (age 66)

Sport
- Country: Norway
- Sport: Paralympic swimming
- Disability class: S8
Medal record
Representing Norway
Paralympic swimming
Paralympic Games
Gold medal – first place	1976 Toronto	100m butterfly C1
Gold medal – first place	1976 Toronto	100m freestyle C1
Gold medal – first place	1976 Toronto	4x50m individual medley C1
Gold medal – first place	1980 Arnhem	100m breaststroke C1
Gold medal – first place	1980 Arnhem	3x50m individual medley C1
Gold medal – first place	1984 Stoke Mandeville/New York	100m freestyle A3
Gold medal – first place	1984 Stoke Mandeville/New York	100m backstroke A3
Gold medal – first place	1984 Stoke Mandeville/New York	100m breaststroke A3
Gold medal – first place	1984 Stoke Mandeville/New York	100m butterfly A3
Gold medal – first place	1984 Stoke Mandeville/New York	200m individual medley A3
Gold medal – first place	1988 Seoul	100m butterfly L4
Gold medal – first place	1988 Seoul	200m individual medley L4
Gold medal – first place	1992 Barcelona	100m butterfly S8
Silver medal – second place	1980 Arnhem	100m freestyle C1-D1
Silver medal – second place	1980 Arnhem	100m backstroke C1-D1
Silver medal – second place	1988 Seoul	100m freestyle L4
Silver medal – second place	1992 Barcelona	50m freestyle S8
Silver medal – second place	1992 Barcelona	100m freestyle S8
Silver medal – second place	1992 Barcelona	200m individual medley SM8
Bronze medal – third place	1988 Seoul	100m breaststroke L4
World Championships
Bronze medal – third place	1994 Malta	50m freestyle S8
Bronze medal – third place	1994 Malta	100m butterfly S8

Erling Trondsen (born 28 December 1959) is a Paralympic swimmer from Norway. He has won 20 medals, thirteen of them gold, between 1976 and 1992.

Trondsen is currently an organizer in disabled beach volleyball. and coach.
