= Budin (surname) =

Budin is a surname in various languages. Budín (feminine: Budínová) is a Czech surname. Notable people with the surnames include:

- Hanoch Budin (born 1962), Israeli para swimmer
- Pierre-Constant Budin (1846–1907), French obstetrician
- Slávka Budínová (1924–2002), Czech film actress
- Tom Budin (born 1995), Australian DJ and record producer
