= Jennifer Johnson (table tennis) =

American para-table tennis player

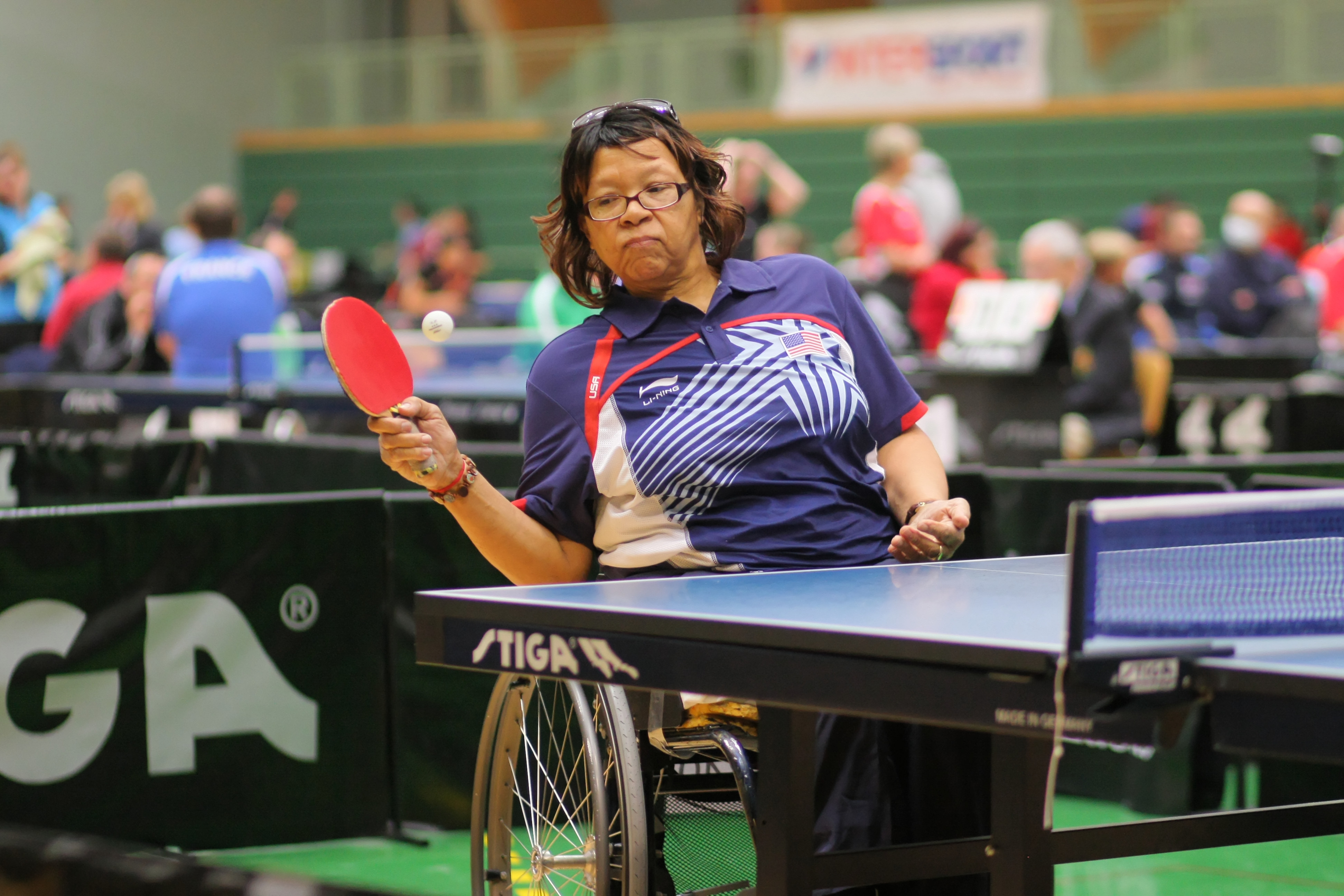

Personal information
- Full name: Jennifer Ellen Johnson
- Born: Jennifer Ellen Brown; October 25, 1948 (age 77) Mandeville, Jamaica
- Home town: Port Chester, New York, U.S.

Sport
- Country: United States
- Sport: Para table tennis
- Disability: Polio
- Disability class: C4
- Club: Westchester Table Tennis Center and Burke Table Tennis Club
- Coached by: Rawle Alleyne; Pei Zhen Shao
Medal record
Wheelchair basketball
Representing Jamaica
Paralympic Games
Silver medal – second place	1972 Heidelberg	Women's teams
Para table tennis
Representing United States
Paralympic Games
Gold medal – first place	1988 Seoul	Women's open singles
Gold medal – first place	1988 Seoul	Women's teams C4
Gold medal – first place	1996 Atlanta	Women's singles C4
Silver medal – second place	1984 Stoke Mandeville/New York	Women's singles C3
Silver medal – second place	1984 Stoke Mandeville/New York	Women's teams 1A-C
Silver medal – second place	1988 Seoul	Women's singles C4
Bronze medal – third place	1996 Atlanta	Women's teams C3-5
World Championships
Bronze medal – third place	1990 Assen	Women's singles C4
Bronze medal – third place	1990 Assen	Women's teams C4-5
Para Pan-American Championships
Silver medal – second place	2003 Brasilia	Women's singles C4
Bronze medal – third place	2001 Buenos Aires	Women's open wheelchair
Bronze medal – third place	2001 Buenos Aires	Women's singles C4-5
Bronze medal – third place	2003 Brasilia	Women's open wheelchair
Bronze medal – third place	2009 Margarita Island	Women's singles C4-5
Parapan American Games
Gold medal – first place	1999 Mexico City	Women's singles C4
Silver medal – second place	1999 Mexico City	Women's open wheelchair
Silver medal – second place	1999 Mexico City	Women's teams C4-5
Bronze medal – third place	2015 Toronto	Women's teams C4-5

Jennifer Ellen Johnson (née Brown, born October 25, 1948) is a former wheelchair basketball player and a para table tennis player. She developed polio at the age of five in Jamaica. She has represented Jamaica at the Paralympics from 1968 to 1980 and then represented the United States at the Paralympics from 1984 to 2004. She was married to Denton Johnson before his death.

== Sporting career ==
Johnson first started playing ball sports in her teens, she was introduced to a lot of sports and was interested in table tennis. She participated for home nation Jamaica at the 1972 Summer Paralympics in Heidelberg, Germany and won a silver medal in wheelchair basketball. Johnson's family immigrated to the United States after the 1972 Summer Paralympics, she joined the Paralympic table tennis team in 1983 and one year later won two silver medals in the 1984 Summer Paralympics along with Pamela Fontaine.
