= Hanoch Budin =

Israeli Paralympic swimmer and volleyball player

Personal information
- Native name: חנוך בודין
- Nationality: Israeli
- Born: 8 May 1962 (age 64)

Sport
- Country: Israel
- Sport: Para swimming, volleyball
Medal record
Event / 1st / 2nd / 3rd; Paralympic Games / 2 / 1 / 5
Representing Israel
Men's para swimming
Paralympic Games
Gold medal – first place	1988 Seoul	200m ind. medley A8
Gold medal – first place	1988 Seoul	100m backstroke A8
Silver medal – second place	1992 Barcelona	50m freestyle S9
Bronze medal – third place	1984 Stoke Mandeville	100m freestyle A8
Bronze medal – third place	1988 Seoul	100m breaststroke A8
Bronze medal – third place	1988 Seoul	400m freestyle A8
Bronze medal – third place	1988 Seoul	100m freestyle A8
Bronze medal – third place	1992 Barcelona	4X100m freestyle relay S7-10
World Championships
Bronze medal – third place	1994 Malta	50m freestyle S9

Hanoch Budin (Hebrew: חנוך בודין; born 8 May 1962) is a former Israeli para swimmer.

== Career ==
Budin represented Israel at the Summer Paralympics as a member of the swimming team in six Paralympics from 1984 through 2004, winning eight medals. At the 1984 Summer Paralympics he won his first medal winning bronze in the 100m freestyle tournament for class A8. He went on to win five medals at the 1988 Summer Paralympics, including two gold medals. His final two medals were gained at the 1992 Summer Paralympics, though he continued participating in tournaments at the 1996, 2000 and 2004 Paralympics.

Honored as the final torchbearer, Budin lit the ceremonial flame to open the 1989 Maccabiah Games.

In 2009 Budin was a contestant on Survivor.
