= Soviet Union at the 1988 Summer Paralympics =

- Flag of the Soviet Union
- IPC code: URS

in Seoul
- Competitors: 22 in 2 sports
- Medals Ranked 12th: Gold 21 Silver 20 Bronze 15 Total 56

Summer Paralympics appearances (overview)
- 1988

Other related appearances
- Unified Team (1992); Estonia (1992–pres.); Latvia (1992–pres.); Lithuania (1992–pres.); Belarus (1994–pres.); Kazakhstan (1994–pres.); Russia (1994–2014); Armenia (1996–pres.); Azerbaijan (1996–pres.); Kyrgyzstan (1996–pres.); Moldova (1996–pres.); Ukraine (1996–pres.); Turkmenistan (2000–pres.); Tajikistan (2004–pres.); Uzbekistan (2004–pres.); Georgia (2008–pres.); RPC (2020)

The Union of Soviet Socialist Republics made its Summer Paralympic début at the 1988 Summer Paralympics in Seoul. This was not only its first, but also its last appearance in the Summer Paralympics before its dissolution. The country participated only in athletics and swimming events. Soviet competitors won 56 medals, of which 21 were gold.

Vadim Kalmykov, with four gold medals in track and field, was the USSR's most successful athlete at the Games.

== Medalists ==
Medal	Name	Sport	Event
Gold	Victor Riabochtan	Athletics	Men's 100m B1
Gold	Alexandre Mokhir	Athletics	Men's 100m B2
Gold	Victor Riabochtan	Athletics	Men's 400m B1
Gold	Vadim Kalmykov	Athletics	Men's high jump B2
Gold	Oleg Chepel	Athletics	Men's high jump B3
Gold	Vadim Kalmykov	Athletics	Men's long jump B2
Gold	Oleg Chepel	Athletics	Men's long jump B3
Gold	Vadim Kalmykov	Athletics	Men's triple jump B2
Gold	Vitautas Guirnus	Athletics	Men's javelin throw B1
Gold	Alexandre Mokhir	Athletics	Men's javelin throw B2
Gold	Vitautas Guirnus	Athletics	Men's pentathlon B1
Gold	Vadim Kalmykov	Athletics	Men's pentathlon B2
Gold	Oleg Chepel	Athletics	Men's pentathlon B3
Gold	Raissa Jouravliova	Athletics	Women's 100m B2
Gold	Tamara Pankova	Athletics	Women's 400m B1
Gold	Rima Batalova	Athletics	Women's 400m B2
Gold	Tamara Pankova	Athletics	Women's 800m B1
Gold	Rima Batalova	Athletics	Women's 800m B2
Gold	Tamara Pankova	Athletics	Women's 1500m B1
Gold	Raissa Jouravliova	Athletics	Women's long jump B2
Gold	Raissa Jouravliova	Athletics	Women's pentathlon B2
Silver	Sergei Sevastianov	Athletics	Men's 100m B1
Silver	Anatoly Pomykalov	Athletics	Men's 800m B2
Silver	Farzat Timerboulatov	Athletics	Men's 800m B3
Silver	Farzat Timerboulatov	Athletics	Men's 1500m B3
Silver	Sergei Sevastianov	Athletics	Men's triple jump B1
Silver	Sergei Sevastianov	Athletics	Men's pentathlon B1
Silver	Alexandre Mokhir	Athletics	Men's pentathlon B2
Silver	Danute Chmidek	Athletics	Women's 800m B3
Silver	Raissa Jouravliova	Athletics	Women's discus throw B2
Silver	Oleg Cher	Swimming	Men's 50m freestyle B1
Silver	Oleg Cher	Swimming	Men's 100m freestyle B1
Silver	Oleg Cher	Swimming	Men's 100m backstroke B1
Silver	Alexandre Gapon	Swimming	Men's 100m breaststroke B2
Silver	Vladimir Sigidov	Swimming	Men's 200m breaststroke B1
Silver	Alexandre Gapon	Swimming	Men's 200m breaststroke B2
Silver	Oleg Cher	Swimming	Men's 200m individual medley B1
Silver	Men's relay team	Swimming	Men's 4x100m freestyle relay B1-B3
Silver	Men's relay team	Swimming	Men's 4x100m medley relay B1-B3
Silver	Nadežda Maksimova	Swimming	Women's 50m freestyle B3
Silver	Tatiana Chipovalova	Swimming	Women's 50m breaststroke B2
Bronze	Anatoly Pomykalov	Athletics	Men's 400m B2
Bronze	Anatoly Pomykalov	Athletics	Men's 5000m B2
Bronze	Victor Riabochtan	Athletics	Men's long jump B1
Bronze	Andrei Kolyvanov	Athletics	Men's javelin throw B3
Bronze	Rima Batalova	Athletics	Women's 100m B2
Bronze	Danute Chmidek	Athletics	Women's 400m B3
Bronze	Mikhail Kapitonov	Swimming	Men's 50m freestyle B2
Bronze	Oleg Cher	Swimming	Men's 400m freestyle B1
Bronze	Vladimir Sigidov	Swimming	Men's 100m breaststroke B1
Bronze	Tatiana Chipovalova	Swimming	Women's 50m freestyle B2
Bronze	Tatiana Chipovalova	Swimming	Women's 100m freestyle B2
Bronze	Nadežda Maksimova	Swimming	Women's 100m freestyle B3
Bronze	Tatiana Chipovalova	Swimming	Women's 100m breaststroke B2
Bronze	Tatiana Chipovalova	Swimming	Women's 200m breaststroke B2
Bronze	Tatiana Chipovalova	Swimming	Women's 400m individual medley B2

== See also ==
- Soviet Union at the Paralympics
- Soviet Union at the 1988 Summer Olympics
