= Argentina at the 1988 Summer Paralympics =

- IPC code: ARG
- NPC: Argentine Paralympic Committee
- Website: www.coparg.org.ar

in Seoul
- Competitors: 35
- Medals Ranked 39th: Gold 0 Silver 7 Bronze 2 Total 9

Summer Paralympics appearances (overview)
- 1960; 1964; 1968; 1972; 1976; 1980; 1984; 1988; 1992; 1996; 2000; 2004; 2008; 2012; 2016; 2020; 2024

Argentina competed at the 1988 Summer Paralympics in Seoul, South Korea. 35 competitors from Argentina won 9 medals including 7 silver and 2 bronze medals and finished 39th in the medal table.

== See also ==
- Argentina at the Paralympics
- Argentina at the 1988 Summer Olympics
