= Bulgaria at the 1988 Summer Paralympics =

- IPC code: BUL
- NPC: Bulgarian Paralympic Association

in Seoul
- Competitors: 8
- Medals Ranked 32nd: Gold 2 Silver 1 Bronze 0 Total 3

Summer Paralympics appearances (overview)
- 1988; 1992; 1996; 2000; 2004; 2008; 2012; 2016; 2020; 2024

Bulgaria competed at the 1988 Summer Paralympics in Seoul, South Korea. Eight competitors from Bulgaria won three medals, two gold and one silver and finished 32nd in the medal table.

== See also ==
- Bulgaria at the Paralympics
- Bulgaria at the 1988 Summer Olympics
