= Czechoslovakia at the 1988 Summer Paralympics =

- IPC code: TCH

in Seoul
- Competitors: 1
- Medals Ranked 45th: Gold 0 Silver 1 Bronze 0 Total 1

Summer Paralympics appearances (overview)
- 1972; 1976; 1980; 1984; 1988; 1992

Other related appearances
- Czech Republic (1994–); Slovakia (1994–)

Czechoslovakia competed at the 1988 Summer Paralympics in Seoul, South Korea. 1 competitor from Czechoslovakia won a single silver medal and finished joint 45th in the medal table along with Thailand.

== See also ==
- Czechoslovakia at the Paralympics
- Czechoslovakia at the 1988 Summer Olympics
