= Cheng Yu (table tennis) =

Chinese retired para table tennis player

Personal information
- Born: 1952 (age 73–74) Wuhan, Hubei, China

Sport
- Sport: Table tennis
Medal record
Women's para table tennis
Representing China
Paralympic Games
Gold medal – first place	1988 Seoul	Teams TT6
Bronze medal – third place	1988 Seoul	Singles TT6
FESPIC Games
Gold medal – first place	1989 Kobe	Singles TT6
Gold medal – first place	1989 Kobe	Teams TT6

Cheng Yu (Chinese: 程瑜; pinyin: Chéng Yú, born c. 1952) is a Chinese retired para table tennis player. She won a gold and a bronze medal at the 1988 Summer Paralympics. She was once trained by Feng Mengya.

She sustained injuries to both feet in a traffic accident when she was 15. As hospitals were in limbo during the Cultural Revolution, her treatment was delayed, which caused her left foot to be amputated eight years later. She has worked as a physician since her retirement.
