= Laura Tramuns =

Spanish Paralympic swimmer

Personal information
- Full name: Laura Tramuns Tripiana
- Nationality: Spanish
- Born: 19 February 1970 (age 56) Badalona, Spain

Sport
- Country: Spain
- Sport: Swimming (S8)
Medal record
Women's swimming
Representing Spain
Paralympic Games
| Silver medal – second place | 1996 Atlanta | 100 m breaststroke |

Laura Tramuns Tripiana (born 19 February 1970 in Badalona) is an S8 swimmer from Spain. She has a physical disability. She competed at the 1996 Summer Paralympics and 2000 Summer Paralympics in swimming. In 1996, she earned a silver medal in the 100 meter breaststroke race.
