= Mexico at the 1988 Summer Paralympics =

- IPC code: MEX
- NPC: Federacion Mexicana de Deporte

in Seoul
- Medals Ranked 24th: Gold 8 Silver 9 Bronze 7 Total 24

Summer Paralympics appearances (overview)
- 1972; 1976; 1980; 1984; 1988; 1992; 1996; 2000; 2004; 2008; 2012; 2016; 2020; 2024

Mexico sent a delegation to compete at the 1988 Summer Paralympics in Seoul, South Korea. Its athletes finished twenty-fourth in the overall medal count.

== Medalists ==
Medal	Name	Sport	Event
Gold	Moisés Galindo	Swimming	Men's − 200m individual medley 5
Gold	Juana Soto	Athletics	Women's − 100m 5-6
Gold	Juana Soto	Athletics	Women's − 400m 5-6
Gold	Leticia Torres	Athletics	Women's − 100m 1C
Gold	Leticia Torres	Athletics	Women's − 200m 1C
Gold	Leticia Torres	Athletics	Women's − 400m 1C
Gold	Leticia Torres	Athletics	Women's − 800m 1C
Gold	Cecilia Vázquez	Athletics	Women's − 200m 4
Silver	Moisés Galindo	Swimming	Men's − 100m butterfly 5
Silver	Saúl Mendoza	Athletics	Men's − 200m 4
Silver	José Manuel Ríos	Athletics	Men's − 5000m 5-6
Silver	Juana Soto	Athletics	Women's − 200m 5-6
Silver	Araceli Castro; Dora Elia García; Juana Soto; Cecilia Vázquez	Athletics	Women's − 4 × 200 m 2-6
Silver	Leticia Torres	Athletics	Women's − 1500m 1C
Silver	Víctor Valdez	Athletics	Men's − -95 kg paraplegic
Silver	Cecilia Vázquez	Athletics	Women's − 100m 4
Silver	Cecilia Vázquez	Athletics	Women's − 400m 4
Bronze	Dora Elia García	Athletics	Women's − 200m 2
Bronze	Moisés Galindo	Swimming	Men's − 100m freestyle 5
Bronze	Aarón Gordián	Athletics	Men's − 200m 4
Bronze	Saúl Mendoza	Athletics	Men's − 800m 4
Bronze	Saúl Mendoza	Athletics	Men's − 5000m 4
Bronze	José Manuel Ríos	Athletics	Men's − 200m 5-6
Bronze	Jorge Ernesto Varela	Athletics	Men's − pentathlon 6

== See also ==
- 1988 Summer Paralympics
- Mexico at the 1988 Summer Olympics
