= New Zealand at the 1988 Summer Paralympics =

- IPC code: NZL
- NPC: Paralympics New Zealand
- Website: paralympics.org.nz

in Seoul
- Medals Ranked 30th: Gold 2 Silver 4 Bronze 11 Total 17

Summer Paralympics appearances (overview)
- 1968; 1972; 1976; 1980; 1984; 1988; 1992; 1996; 2000; 2004; 2008; 2012; 2016; 2020; 2024

New Zealand won 17 medals at the 1988 Summer Paralympics: 2 golds, 4 silver and 11 bronze medals.

== See also ==
- New Zealand at the Paralympics
