= Tom Hainey =

Canadian Paralympic athlete (born 1965)

Personal information
- Nationality: Canadian
- Born: 6 November 1965 (age 60)

Sport
- Country: Canada
- Sport: Swimming
- Disability: Spina bifida
Medal record
Swimming
Representing Canada
Paralympics
| Silver medal – second place | 1988 Seoul | Men's 100 m Freestyle 6 |
| Silver medal – second place | 1988 Seoul | Men's 400 m Freestyle 6 |
| Silver medal – second place | 1988 Seoul | Men's 200 m Individual Medley 6 |
| Silver medal – second place | 1988 Seoul | Men's 100 m Butterfly 6 |
| Gold medal – first place | 1984 Stoke Mandeville / New York | Men's 4x50 m Individual Medley 6 |
| Silver medal – second place | 1984 Stoke Mandeville / New York | Men's 100 m Butterfly 6 |
| Gold medal – first place | 1984 Stoke Mandeville / New York | Men's 100 m Breaststroke 6 |
| Gold medal – first place | 1984 Stoke Mandeville / New York | Men's 100 m Freestyle 6 |

Thomas Hainey Jr. (born 6 November 1965) is a Canadian retired Paralympic swimmer from Atikokan, Ontario. He competed in swimming events, winning four gold and five silver medals. Hainey currently serves as community services manager for his home town.
