= Denmark at the 1988 Summer Paralympics =

- IPC code: DEN
- NPC: Paralympic Committee Denmark
- Website: www.paralympic.dk

in Seoul
- Competitors: 48
- Medals Ranked 11th: Gold 23 Silver 19 Bronze 22 Total 64

Summer Paralympics appearances (overview)
- 1968; 1972; 1976; 1980; 1984; 1988; 1992; 1996; 2000; 2004; 2008; 2012; 2016; 2020; 2024

Denmark competed at the 1988 Summer Paralympics in Seoul, South Korea. 48 competitors from Denmark won 64 medals including 23 gold, 19 silver and 22 bronze, finishing 11th in the medal table.

== See also ==
- Denmark at the Paralympics
- Denmark at the 1988 Summer Olympics
