= Austria at the 1988 Summer Paralympics =

- IPC code: AUT
- NPC: Austrian Paralympic Committee
- Website: www.oepc.at (in German)

in Seoul
- Competitors: 43
- Medals Ranked 20th: Gold 13 Silver 7 Bronze 15 Total 35

Summer Paralympics appearances (overview)
- 1960; 1964; 1968; 1972; 1976; 1980; 1984; 1988; 1992; 1996; 2000; 2004; 2008; 2012; 2016; 2020; 2024

Austria competed at the 1988 Summer Paralympics in Seoul, South Korea. 43 competitors from Austria won 35 medals including 13 gold, 7 silver and 15 bronze and finished 20th in the medal table.

== See also ==
- Austria at the Paralympics
- Austria at the 1988 Summer Olympics
