= Switzerland at the 1988 Summer Paralympics =

- IPC code: SUI
- NPC: Swiss Paralympic Committee
- Website: www.swissparalympic.ch

in Seoul
- Competitors: 41
- Medals Ranked 21st: Gold 12 Silver 12 Bronze 11 Total 35

Summer Paralympics appearances (overview)
- 1960; 1964; 1968; 1972; 1976; 1980; 1984; 1988; 1992; 1996; 2000; 2004; 2008; 2012; 2016; 2020; 2024

Switzerland competed at the 1988 Summer Paralympics in Seoul, South Korea. 41 competitors from Switzerland won 35 medals (12 gold, 12 silver and 11 bronze), and they finished 21st in the medal table.

== See also ==
- Switzerland at the Paralympics
- Switzerland at the 1988 Summer Olympics
