= Sweden at the 1988 Summer Paralympics =

- IPC code: SWE
- NPC: Swedish Parasports Federation

in Seoul
- Competitors: 103
- Flag bearer: Helene Rönnegaard
- Medals Ranked 6th: Gold 42 Silver 38 Bronze 23 Total 103

Summer Paralympics appearances (overview)
- 1960; 1964; 1968; 1972; 1976; 1980; 1984; 1988; 1992; 1996; 2000; 2004; 2008; 2012; 2016; 2020; 2024

Sweden competed at the 1988 Summer Paralympics in Seoul, South Korea. 103 competitors from Sweden won 103 medals including 42 gold, 38 silver and 23 bronze, finishing 6th in the medal table.

== See also ==
- Sweden at the Paralympics
- Sweden at the 1988 Summer Olympics
