= West Germany at the 1988 Summer Paralympics =

- Flag of Germany
- IPC code: FRG
- NPC: National Paralympic Committee Germany
- Website: www.dbs-npc.de (in German)

in Seoul
- Competitors: 188
- Medals Ranked 2nd: Gold 76 Silver 65 Bronze 52 Total 193

Summer Paralympics appearances (overview)
- 1960; 1964; 1968; 1972; 1976; 1980; 1984; 1988; 1992; 1996; 2000; 2004; 2008; 2012; 2016; 2020; 2024

Other related appearances
- East Germany (1984)

West Germany competed at the 1988 Summer Paralympics in Seoul, South Korea. 188 competitors from West Germany won 193 medals including 76 gold, 65 silver and 52 bronze and finished 2nd in the medal table.

== See also ==
- West Germany at the Paralympics
- West Germany at the 1988 Summer Olympics
