= Japan at the 1988 Summer Paralympics =

- IPC code: JPN
- NPC: Japan Paralympic Committee
- Website: www.jsad.or.jp (in Japanese)

in Seoul
- Competitors: 143
- Medals Ranked 14th: Gold 17 Silver 12 Bronze 17 Total 46

Summer Paralympics appearances (overview)
- 1964; 1968; 1972; 1976; 1980; 1984; 1988; 1992; 1996; 2000; 2004; 2008; 2012; 2016; 2020; 2024

Japan competed at the 1988 Summer Paralympics in Seoul, South Korea. 143 competitors from Japan won 46 medals including 17 gold, 12 silver and 17 bronze and finished 14th in the medal table.

== See also ==
- Japan at the Paralympics
- Japan at the 1988 Summer Olympics
