= Netherlands at the 1988 Summer Paralympics =

- Flag of the Netherlands
- IPC code: NED (HOL used at these Games)
- NPC: Nederlands Olympisch Comité * Nederlandse Sport Federatie
- Website: paralympisch.nl (in Dutch)

in Seoul
- Competitors: 110 (76 men and 34 women)
- Medals Ranked 8th: Gold 30 Silver 24 Bronze 29 Total 83

Summer Paralympics appearances (overview)
- 1960; 1964; 1968; 1972; 1976; 1980; 1984; 1988; 1992; 1996; 2000; 2004; 2008; 2012; 2016; 2020; 2024

Netherlands competed at the 1988 Summer Paralympics in Seoul, South Korea. The team included 110 athletes, 76 men and 34 women. Competitors from Netherlands won 83 medals, including 30 gold, 24 silver and 29 bronze to finish 8th in the medal table.

== See also ==
- Netherlands at the Paralympics
- Netherlands at the 1988 Summer Olympics
