= South Korea at the 1988 Summer Paralympics =

- IPC code: KOR
- NPC: Korean Paralympic Committee
- Website: www.kosad.or.kr (in Korean)

in Seoul
- Competitors: 227
- Medals Ranked 7th: Gold 40 Silver 35 Bronze 19 Total 94

Summer Paralympics appearances (overview)
- 1968; 1972; 1976; 1980; 1984; 1988; 1992; 1996; 2000; 2004; 2008; 2012; 2016; 2020; 2024

South Korea competed at the 1988 Summer Paralympics in Seoul, South Korea. 227 competitors from South Korea won 94 medals including 40 gold, 35 silver and 19 bronze and finished 7th in the medal table.

== See also ==
- South Korea at the Paralympics
- South Korea at the 1988 Summer Olympics
