= 1988 Summer Paralympics =

Multi-parasport event in Seoul, South Korea

VIII Paralympic Games
- Location: Seoul, South Korea
- Motto: United for the Challenge (Korean: 도전을 위한 화합; RR: Dojeon-eul Wihan Hwahab)
- Nations: 60
- Athletes: 3,057
- Events: 725 in 17 sports
- Opening: 15 October 1988
- Closing: 24 October 1988
- Opened by: President Roh Tae-Woo
- Stadium: Jamsil Olympic Stadium

The 1988 Summer Paralympics (Korean: 1988년 하계 패럴림픽; RR: Cheon gubaek palsip-pal nyeon hagye paereollimpik) were the first Paralympics in 24 years to take place in the same city as the Olympic Games. They took place in Seoul, South Korea.

== Name ==
This was the first time the term Paralympic was used officially.

== Bidding process ==
During the fourth meeting of the International Paralympic Committee held at the Aylesbury Civic Center in England (28 July 1983), two candidate cities made themselves known;

- Seoul, South Korea, under the initiative of Dr. Whang Youn Dai
- Melbourne, Australia, under the initiative of Dr. John Grant

The ICC sent a questionnaire to gauge the cities' interest and preparedness for hosting such an event. Both candidates were given one year to respond. In the end, only Seoul returned with a completed document; Melbourne did not respond to the ICC.

At the same time, an internal political movement in Australia to have Brisbane to bid to the 1992 Summer Olympics in which the possibility that the city could also host the 1992 Summer Paralympic Games was raised, practically nullified the move for Melbourne to bid for the event. A final choice would have to be made during the sixth meeting of ICC, scheduled for 14 June 1984 in New York City, and Seoul was acclaimed as the host of a unified Paralympics. The 1988 Olympic and Paralympic games were the first to be hosted in the same city since the 1964 Summer Paralympics. The proposal that the 1988 Summer Olympic and Paralympic Games could be held in the same city and using the same facilities, allowed a new generation and rising generation of Paralympic athletes to compete in many of the Olympic venues, something that was never held before. Starting in this edition, the host countries results have shown the importance of assistance of this athletes.

== Relation between the Olympic and Paralympic Organizing Committees ==
The Seoul Paralympic Organizing Committee (SEPOC) had only a tangential relationship with the Seoul Olympic Organizing Committee (SLOOC). But this relationship was substantial enough to recruit and train many athletes, technical officials and other common areas for the Paralympic Games.

== Background ==
For the first time in history since Tokyo 1964, the same city held the Olympics and Paralympics. This tradition was revived in Seoul and has been kept ever since. This was also the first Summer Paralympics in history under the aegis of the International Co-ordinating Committee (ICC). In 1982, the Olympic Family accepted the ICC as member, which allowed greater cooperation by the National Paralympic Committees regarding the organization of the Paralympic Games. After the first approach, and with the help of the IOC, the Seoul Olympic Organizing Committee (SLOOC) understood that the Paralympic Games were an extension of the Olympic Games and formulated a support plan that allowed the sharing of the Seoul Olympic human resources (managers, volunteers, logistics, security, protocol, public and international relations, entry and exit visas for Korea), facilities and equipment. The SLOOC gave a subsidy of US$12,857,143.

=== A specific village for the Paralympic Games ===
Before the 1988 Summer Olympic Games, local citizens had bought all 3,962 apartments at 86 buildings from the Olympic Village. Due to high local demands, the complex was hastily evicted after.

Between 1983 and 1988, Seoul authorities were in the middle of many controversies about the evictions of poor and low-income neighborhoods. Human rights monitors raised these concerns and associated the hosting of the 1986 Asian Games and the 1988 Summer Olympic Games with the actions to clean, redevelop and "beautify" the city, especially the decadent and historical Jamsil area. Despite the construction of gigantic building complexes to accommodate 720,000 people between 1983 and 1988, these new housing offers were unconceived for those who had been evicted – namely low-income or poor renters. When this situation turned public, as a result, scholars, policy-makers and lawyers advocated for a better social housing policy, including minimum housing standards and a higher degree of transparency from the city government.

Consequently, there was not enough time to convert the apartments and facilities to better conditions of accessibility. Another difficult situation was that the transition time between the two events was insufficient (the opening ceremony was scheduled for the October 15 afternoon, 13 days after the end of the Olympic Games). Thus, the government of South Korea and the prefecture of Seoul understood after the new and specific demands the needs for the building a specific Paralympic Village was necessary. This complex was 4 km from an intersection between the Seoul Olympic Park and Jamsil Complex clusters. It was the first housing complex in the Asian continent to be fully accessible to people with disabilities, as the athletes lived in ten specially designed and accessible apartment blocks with 1,316 new apartments in total. Each building had a height of fourteen stories.

Between 1982 and 1986, a delegation composed of some architects sent by Seoul and the Government of South Korea visited the Stoke Mandeville Hospital to research the accessibility of the hospital. They were also to collect information about the complex to design a project to build a specific village.

Due to specific characteristics, this would be the first and only time in history that a Village for the Paralympic Games was to be built. Since this was not foreseen (during the bidding process, the SEPOC had made plans to use the same Village and Venues), the ICC saw Seoul Paralympics Village plans as controversial in some points. One point caused some concern: three of the ten buildings would be exclusive for wheelchair users; the entity had never managed a complex of such large proportions as this.

A question was asked about wheelchair users being evacuated from the buildings in case of internal commotions (such as fires or water leaks). The answer from the architects and planners was simple - in addition to the elevators, each building planned to have a complex of ramps that would go up to the fourteenth floor; this process would be faster and safer. All services that were available in the Olympic Village were replicated on a smaller scale. The SEPOC offered catering, recreation areas, banking, post office facilities, medical and religious centers, an Olympic/Paralympic store and a mall. The 1988 Seoul Paralympic Games was also the first time the Olympics and Paralympics shared some competition venues as the common areas from each event. Since then, every Winter and Summer Paralympic Games has been held in the same cities as the Olympic Games.

== Visual identity ==
When the games ended, the logo used by the Seoul Paralympic Organizing Committee (SEPOC) turned into the first Paralympic symbol. This symbol was used from 1989 to 1994. The Five 'teardrops' (resembling the halves of the taeguk pattern, also found in the South Korean flag) in the 'W' configuration and colors of the Olympic rings represented the five oceans and the five continents. Due to many controversies starting in 1989, this symbol was eventually changed after the 1994 Winter Paralympics, as it was considered too close to the International Olympic Committee's (IOC) 5-ring emblem. Due to these actions, the 1988 Seoul Summer Paralympic Games is considered the start of the Modern Paralympic Games.

== Opening ceremony ==
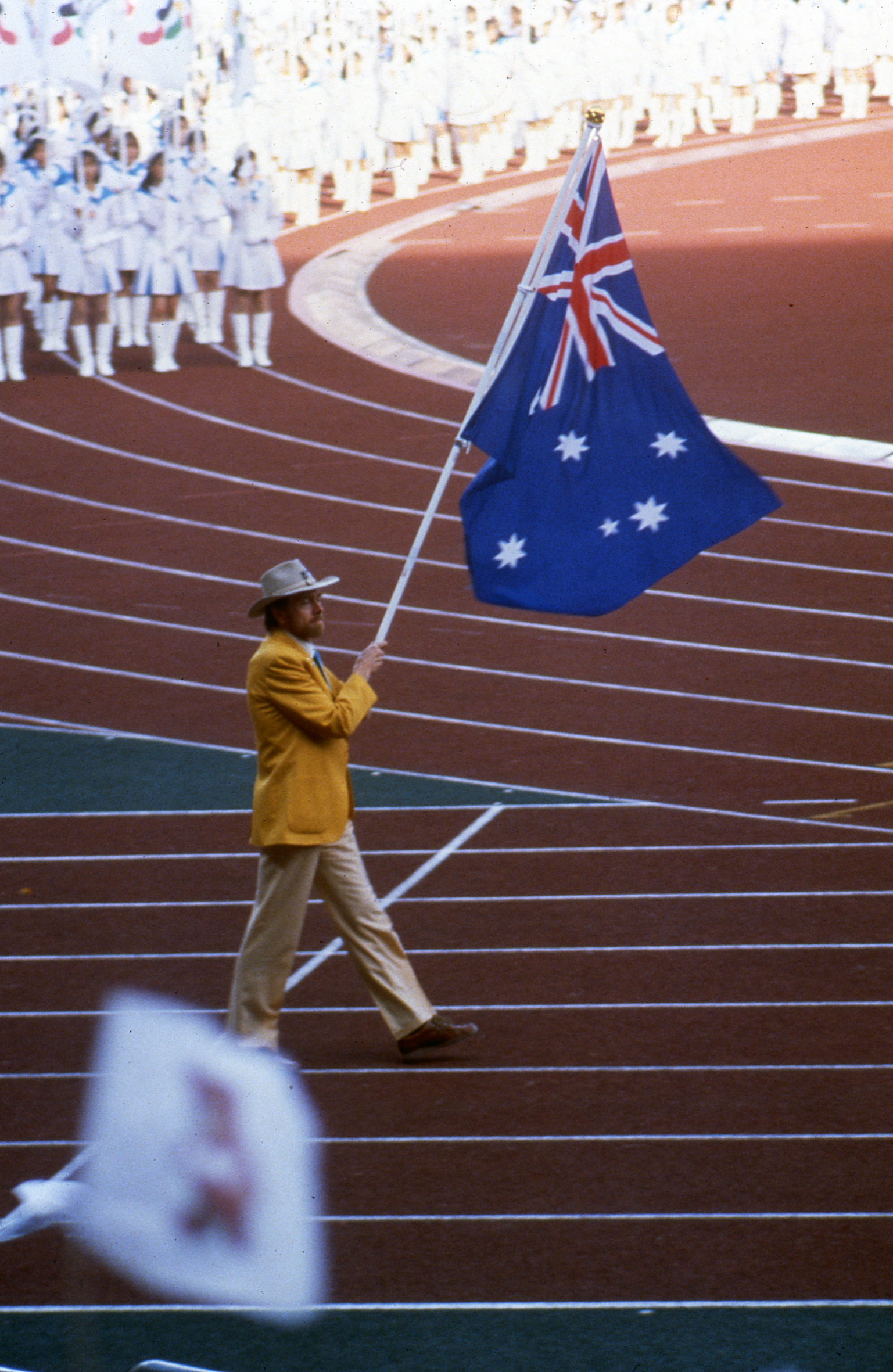
Australian flag bearer Paul Croft at the Opening Ceremony.

During the opening ceremony, over 75,000 people in the Olympic Stadium were watching the enter of then-record of 3,057 competitors from 61 nations. The president of South Korea, Roh Tae-Woo, presented the new Paralympic flag to the president of the ICC, Jens Bromann. Paul Croft, competing in his second Paralympic Games, was the flag bearer for Australia.

Several elements and segments used in the opening and closing ceremonies of the Olympic Games were reenacted or adapted for this ceremony, while interspersed with specific acts. The first entry was made by parachutists in the Paralympic colors of blue, black, red, yellow, and green. They swept into the Olympic Stadium following a procession of children in wheelchairs. The Paralympic Torch was carried in by a one-legged South Korean Paralympic volleyball player and handed to a 19-year-old athlete with cerebral palsy, who in turn passed it to Cho Hyun-hui, a wheelchair athlete. He was wheeled around the stadium by her 7-year-old daughter before handing the Torch to blind runner Lee Jae-oon, who linked hands with women's handball Olympic gold medalist Kiifi Hyun-mi. They were both carried up by an elevator platform to light the Olympic Cauldron. The 2018 Winter Paralympics opening ceremony (also held in South Korea) recreated this scene.

Chief Paralympic Organiser Koh Kwi-nam addressed the athletes. He said that "The goal you as athletes should try to reach for in the Games is not to accomplish the Olympic slogan of 'faster, higher and stronger' but to show the world your real selves as courageous challengers, glorious conquerors and impartial participants."

== Closing ceremonies ==
There were concerns that the number of medals awarded on the final day of competition would mean that competitors would not be able to attend the closing ceremonies. These doubts also existed regarding whether the Spanish flag and anthem would be present during the protocol part of the ceremony, as it was not certain that the next edition would be in Barcelona, as the host city contract and some official documents had not yet been signed by the Spanish authorities. However, as a sign of goodwill and openness, the Organizing Committee of the 1992 Summer Olympics sent a delegation of observers and confirmed its intentions by sending its director of institutional relations to receive the Paralympic flag during the closing ceremony. The host-city contract for the 1992 Summer Paralympics was signed next year. Similarly to the opening ceremony, several cultural elements from its Olympic counterpart were re-presented or adapted again with some specific additions.

== Controversies ==
Despite the advances, the Seoul Paralympic Games also took place with several controversies, embarrassments and polemics. The first one was about the men's goalball tournament draw which placed the teams from Iran and Israel in the same group. In the middle of protests and refusals the Iranian goalball team was disqualified for refusing to play against the Israelis in the first round. The summary elimination of the Iranian team was argued by the ICC "on the grounds that the sport was being misused for political causes, breaking its neutrality" sending the team home immediately. Asghar Dadkhan, the Iranian team manager, made a formal apology pledging that all other Iranian athletes would compete with full regard to the regulations and would compete against Israel and any other nation.

Due to logistic problems, the Libyan delegation arrived in Seoul during the Games; the ICC rules did not allow this situation. Their athletes could not register for the events or stay in the Paralympic Village. They had entered South Korea without having gone through the usual entry procedures. The SEPOC urged the ICC to accept the Libyan team; soon after, they reached a compromise, permitting the athletes and delegates to participate as observers and compete in the marathon events. However, they would not have any medal or official result nor be officially recognized at the closing ceremony.

Another embarrassing moment happened at the athletics slalom event: some athletes were given medals at the end of the first round. Later, officials realized that the medals should not have been awarded until after the second round of competition. The slalom events are dropped from the Paralympics since then.

== Sports ==
The games consisted of events in seventeen sports, including one demonstration sport, but the medals count for the official medal list. Powerlifting and weightlifting were considered to be a single sport.

- Archery (9)
- Athletics(337)
- Boccia(3)
- Cycling(7)
- Football 7-a-side (1)
- Goalball (2)
- Judo(6)
- Lawn bowls(6)
- Lifting
  - Powerlifting (9)
  - Weightlifting (7)
- Shooting (23)
- Snooker (1)
- Swimming (252)
- Table tennis (37)
- Volleyball (2)
- Wheelchair basketball (2)
- Wheelchair fencing

(14)

- Wheelchair tennis(2)

== Medal table ==
The top ten listed NOCs by the number of gold medals are listed below. The host nation, South Korea, is highlighted.

Rank	Nation	Gold	Silver	Bronze	Total
1	United States	91	90	88	269
2	West Germany	76	65	52	193
3	Great Britain	65	65	54	184
4	Canada	55	42	55	152
5	France	46	44	50	140
6	Sweden	42	38	23	103
7	South Korea*	40	35	19	94
8	Netherlands	30	24	29	83
9	Australia	23	34	38	95
10	Poland	23	25	33	81
Totals (10 entries)		491	462	441	1,394

== Participating delegations ==
Sixty delegations took part in the Seoul Paralympics. Burma, which had taken part in the previous Games, was absent. The Seoul Paralympics occurred weeks after the 8888 Uprising and the military coup which brought the State Peace and Development Council to power. Burma would return as Myanmar in 1992.

The Soviet Union made its Summer Paralympic debut, previously participating in the 1988 Winter Paralympics. It was not only the USSR's first participation in the Summer Games but was also to be its last, as the Union was dissolved before the 1992 Summer Paralympics. It won a total of 56 medals, of which 21 were gold. Other countries who made first appearances were Bulgaria, Cyprus, Iran, Macau, Morocco, Oman, Philippines, Singapore and Tunisia.

- Argentina (35)
- Australia (175)
- Austria (43)
- Bahamas (4)
- Bahrain (11)
- Belgium (54)
- Brazil (59)
- Bulgaria (8)
- Canada (157)
- China (41)
- Colombia (16)
- Cyprus (6)
- Czechoslovakia (1)
- Denmark (48)
- Egypt (46)
- Faroe Islands (4)
- Finland (61)
- France (116)
- Great Britain (224)
- Greece (4)
- Guatemala (1)
- Hong Kong (42)
- Hungary (34)
- Iceland (14)
- India (2)
- Indonesia (19)
- Iran (36)
- Ireland (53)
- Israel (62)
- Italy (95)
- Jamaica (5)
- Japan (143)
- Jordan (7)
- Kenya (12)
- Kuwait (30)
- Liechtenstein (2)
- Macau (7)
- Malaysia (14)
- Mexico (33)
- Morocco (14)
- Netherlands (110)
- New Zealand (16)
- Norway (34)
- Oman (9)
- Philippines (4)
- Poland (46)
- Portugal (13)
- Puerto Rico (13)
- Singapore (8)
- South Korea (226)
- Soviet Union (22)
- Spain (50)
- Sweden (103)
- Switzerland (41)
- Thailand (10)
- Trinidad and Tobago (4)
- Tunisia (1)
- United States (371)
- West Germany (188)
- Yugoslavia (34)

== See also ==
- 1988 Summer Olympics
- 1988 Winter Paralympics

Preceded by New York–Stoke Mandeville	Summer Paralympics; Seoul; VIII Paralympic Summer Games (1988)	Succeeded by Barcelona–Madrid
