= Athletics at the 1988 Summer Paralympics =

Athletics at the VIII Paralympic Games
- Host stadium (shown in 2020)
- Venue: Jamsil Olympic Stadium and Auxiliary Stadium
- Dates: 16 to 24 October,1988
- Competitors: 1141 from 57 nations

Athletics at the 1988 Summer Paralympics consisted of 345 events. Because of ties for third place in the men's 800 metre A1–3/A9/L2 and precision throw C1 events, a total of 347 bronze medals were awarded. There was also a tie for first place in the women's 100 m 5–6. That meant 345 gold medals and 344 silver medals were awarded. Bulgaria, Puerto Rico, South Korea, Thailand and Tunisia won their first ever medals in this sport.

== Participating nations ==
- Argentina (6)
- Australia (76)
- Austria (24)
- Bahamas (4)
- Bahrain (9)
- Belgium (15)
- Brazil (34)
- Bulgaria (3)
- Canada (79)
- China (19)
- Colombia (11)
- Cyprus (3)
- Denmark (7)
- Egypt (9)
- Finland (24)
- France (20)
- Great Britain (64)
- Greece (2)
- Hong Kong (14)
- Hungary (4)
- Iceland (3)
- India (2)
- Indonesia (10)
- Iran (17)
- Ireland (33)
- Israel (4)
- Italy (39)
- Jamaica (4)
- Japan (64)
- Jordan (4)
- Kenya (8)
- Kuwait (18)
- Liechtenstein (1)
- Macau (7)
- Malaysia (9)
- Mexico (20)
- Morocco (5)
- Netherlands (15)
- New Zealand (11)
- Norway (11)
- Oman (5)
- Philippines (3)
- Poland (17)
- Portugal (10)
- Puerto Rico (5)
- Singapore (7)
- South Korea (47)
- Soviet Union (14)
- Spain (11)
- Sweden (13)
- Switzerland (20)
- Thailand (6)
- Trinidad and Tobago (1)
- Tunisia (1)
- United States (195)
- West Germany (64)
- Yugoslavia (10)

== Medal summary ==
=== Medal table ===
Rank	Nation	Gold	Silver	Bronze	Total
1	United States (USA)	50	56	56	162
2	West Germany (FRG)	41	36	29	106
3	Great Britain (GBR)	30	22	19	71
4	Canada (CAN)	29	28	33	90
5	Soviet Union (URS)	21	9	6	36
6	South Korea (KOR)	16	11	9	36
7	Australia (AUS)	14	19	20	53
8	France (FRA)	14	13	11	38
9	Japan (JPN)	12	6	14	32
10	Switzerland (SUI)	9	10	9	28
11	Ireland (IRL)	9	9	12	30
12	Denmark (DEN)	9	4	5	18
13	Austria (AUT)	9	3	9	21
14	Belgium (BEL)	8	7	4	19
15	Netherlands (NED)	8	3	5	16
16	Mexico (MEX)	7	7	6	20
17	Finland (FIN)	6	17	6	29
18	Poland (POL)	6	5	12	23
19	Spain (ESP)	6	3	3	12
20	Sweden (SWE)	5	8	6	19
21	Italy (ITA)	5	4	13	22
22	Kuwait (KUW)	5	4	6	15
23	Norway (NOR)	4	7	6	17
24	China (CHN)	3	10	5	18
25	Brazil (BRA)	3	8	4	15
26	Yugoslavia (YUG)	3	1	9	13
27	Iran (IRI)	3	1	3	7
28	Portugal (POR)	2	5	4	11
29	Israel (ISR)	2	4	2	8
30	Bulgaria (BUL)	2	1	0	3
31	Jamaica (JAM)	1	4	3	8
32	Puerto Rico (PUR)	1	2	0	3
33	Bahrain (BRN)	1	1	1	3
34	Egypt (EGY)	1	1	0	2
35	Iceland (ISL)	1	0	2	3
36	Argentina (ARG)	0	4	1	5
37	New Zealand (NZL)	0	3	6	9
38	Kenya (KEN)	0	3	1	4
39	Hungary (HUN)	0	2	0	2
39	Indonesia (INA)	0	2	0	2
41	Thailand (THA)	0	1	0	1
42	Hong Kong (HKG)	0	0	3	3
43	Greece (GRE)	0	0	2	2
43	Tunisia (TUN)	0	0	2	2
Totals (44 entries)		346	344	347	1,037

=== Men's events ===
Event	Gold	Silver	Bronze
100 m 1A	Hans Lubbering; West Germany	Bart Dodson; United States	Rainer Küschall; Switzerland
100 m 1B	Peter Carruthers; Great Britain	Vincenzo Vallelonga; Australia	William Furbish; United States
100 m 1C	Randy Dorman; United States	Andre Beaudoin; Canada	Theo Duyvestijn; Netherlands
100 m 2	Errol Marklein; West Germany	Marc Quessy; Canada	Bob Gibson; United States
100 m 3	Robert Figl; West Germany	Lars Lofstrom; Sweden	Duk Ho Hong; South Korea
100 m 4	Hee Sang Yu; South Korea	Jan Kleinheerenbrink; Netherlands	Byung Woo Kim; South Korea
100 m 5–6	Bong Ho Lee; South Korea	Adel Sultan; Bahrain	Iranilson Oliveira; Brazil
100 m A1–3/A9/L2	Daniel Wesley; Canada	Mustapha Badid; France	Hakan Ericsson; Sweden
100 m A2/A9	Todd Schaffhauser; United States	Kerrod McGregor; Australia	Andreas Siegl; Austria
100 m A4/A9	Dennis Oehler; United States	Adrian Lowe; Australia	Robert Barrett; Great Britain
100 m A5/A7	Jerzy Szlezak; Poland	Matthias Bergamo; West Germany	Xuewen Qiu; China
100 m A6/A8–9/L4	Nigel Coultas; Great Britain	William Wiebe; Canada	Rodney Nugent; Australia
100 m B1	Victor Riabochtan; Soviet Union	Sergei Sevastianov; Soviet Union	Yukio Minami; Japan
100 m B2	Alexandre Mokhir; Soviet Union	Andre Asbury; United States	Marcelino Paz; Spain
100 m B3	David Goodman; Australia	Uwe Mehlmann; West Germany	Aldo Manganaro; Italy
100 m C2	David Osborn; United States	Mogens Justesen; Denmark	Darrin Jordan; Ireland
100 m C3	Jamie Bone; Canada	Par Boman; Sweden	David Severin; Canada
100 m C4–5	Robert Easton; Canada	Michael Johner; Canada	David Larson; United States
100 m C6	Henrik Thomsen; Denmark	Colin Keay; Great Britain	Naoki Matsui; Japan
100 m C7	Haukur Gunnarsson; Iceland	Michel Bapte; France	Yiu Cheung Cheung; Hong Kong
100 m C8	Hoon Son; South Korea	José Rebelo; Portugal	Thomas Dieti; United States
200 m 1A	Hans Lubbering; West Germany	Gunther Obert; West Germany	Giuseppe Forni; Switzerland
200 m 1B	Serge Raymond; Canada	Jan-Owe Mattsson; Sweden	Bruce Froendt; United States
200 m 1C	Andre Beaudoin; Canada	Stuart Minifie; New Zealand	Darrell Ray; United States
200 m 2	Errol Marklein; West Germany	Wolfgang Petersen; West Germany	Mike Nugent; Australia
200 m 3	Lars Lofstrom; Sweden	Paul van Winkel; Belgium	Robert Figl; West Germany
200 m 4	Jan Kleinheerenbrink; Netherlands	Saúl Mendoza; Mexico	Aaron Gordian; Mexico
200 m 5–6	Franz Nietlispach; Switzerland	Bong Ho Lee; South Korea	José Manuel Rios; Mexico
200 m A1–3/A9/L2	Mustapha Badid; France	Daniel Wesley; Canada	Hakan Ericsson; Sweden
200 m A4/A9	Dennis Oehler; United States	Adrian Lowe; Australia	Robert Barrett; Great Britain
200 m A5/A7	Jerzy Szlezak; Poland	Matthias Bergamo; West Germany	Xuewen Qiu; China
200 m A6/A8–9/L4	Nigel Coultas; Great Britain	Harri Jauhiainen; Finland	Rodney Nugent; Australia
200 m C2	David Osborn; United States	Darrin Jordan; Ireland	Mogens Justesen; Denmark
200 m C3	Jamie Bone; Canada	Rene Rivera; United States	Par Boman; Sweden
200 m C4-5	Robert Easton; Canada	Gino Vendetti; Canada	Michael Johner; Canada
200 m C6	Colin Keay; Great Britain	Henrik Thomsen; Denmark	Gordon Robertson; Great Britain
200 m C7	Brad Hill; Australia	Sung Kook Kang; South Korea	Haukur Gunnarsson; Iceland
200 m C8	Hoon Son; South Korea	José Rebelo; Portugal	Robert Biancucci; Australia
400 m 1A	Gunther Obert; West Germany	Hans Lubbering; West Germany	Heinrich Koeberle; West Germany
400 m 1B	Clayton Gerein; Canada	Daryl Stubel; Canada	Jan-Owe Mattsson; Sweden
400 m 1C	Jeff Worthington; United States	Andre Beaudoin; Canada	Darrell Ray; United States
400 m 2	Errol Marklein; West Germany	Richard Espinosa; United States	Chris Hallam; Great Britain
400 m 3	Paul van Winkel; Belgium	Robert Figl; West Germany	Lars Lofstrom; Sweden
400 m 4	Farid Amarouche; France	Roelof Keen; Netherlands	Jan Kleinheerenbrink; Netherlands
400 m 5–6	Franz Nietlispach; Switzerland	John Anderson; United States	Bong Ho Lee; South Korea
400 m A1–3/A9/L2	Hakan Ericsson; Sweden	Daniel Wesley; Canada	Ted Vince; Canada
400 m A4/A9	Dennis Oehler; United States	Adrian Lowe; Australia	Andrew O'Sullivan; Australia
400 m A5/A7	Jeff Tiessen; Canada	Jerzy Szlezak; Poland	Slobodan Adzic; Yugoslavia
400 m A6/A8–9/L4	Harri Jauhiainen; Finland	Nigel Coultas; Great Britain	Duk Ki Kim; South Korea
400 m B1	Victor Riabochtan; Soviet Union	César Antônio Gualberto; Brazil	Claudio Costa; Italy
400 m B2	Kurt Prall; Austria	Elmo Ribeiro; Brazil	Anatoly Pomykalov; Soviet Union
400 m B3	Simon Butler; Great Britain	Brian Pegram; United States	Jason Walsh; Australia
400 m C2	David Osborn; United States	Mogens Justesen; Denmark	Darrin Jordan; Ireland
400 m C3	Jamie Bone; Canada	Rene Rivera; United States	David Severin; Canada
400 m C4-5	Robert Easton; Canada	Gino Vendetti; Canada	David Larson; United States
400 m C6	Colin Keay; Great Britain	Gordon Robertson; Great Britain	Monaam Elabed; Tunisia
400 m C7	Sung Kook Kang; South Korea	Brad Hill; Australia	Haukur Gunnarsson; Iceland
400 m C8	Thomas Dietz; United States	Robert Biancucci; Australia	José Rebelo; Portugal
800 m 1A	Gunther Obert; West Germany	Hans Lubbering; West Germany	Heinrich Koeberle; West Germany
800 m 1B	Clayton Gerein; Canada	Peter Schmid; Switzerland	Jan-Owe Mattsson; Sweden
800 m 1C	Jeff Worthington; United States	John Brewer; United States	André Beaudoin; Canada
800 m 2	Paul Clark; Canada	Heinz Frei; Switzerland	Wolfgang Petersen; West Germany
800 m 3	Paul van Winkel; Belgium	Lars Lofstrom; Sweden	André Viger; Canada
800 m 4	Rafael Ibarra; United States	Farid Amarouche; France	Saúl Mendoza; Mexico
800 m 5–6	Franz Nietlispach; Switzerland	John Anderson; United States	Jeff Adams; Canada
800 m A1–3/A9/L2	Daniel Wesley; Canada	Hakan Ericsson; Sweden	Kevin Orr; United States
800 m A1–3/A9/L2	Daniel Wesley; Canada	Hakan Ericsson; Sweden	Philippe Couprie; France
800 m A6/A8–9/L4	Angel Marin; Spain	Harri Jauhiainen; Finland	Jean-Yves Arvier; France
800 m B1	Robert Matthews; Great Britain	Claudio Costa; Italy	Keith Myette; Canada
800 m B2	Noel Thatcher; Great Britain	Anatoly Pomykalov; Soviet Union	Michel Pavon; France
800 m B3	Anthony Hamilton; Great Britain	Farzat Timerboulatov; Soviet Union	Tyrone Branch; United States
800 m C2	David Osborn; United States	Mogens Justesen; Denmark	Ken Thomas; Canada
800 m C7	Benny Govaerts; Belgium	Sung Kook Kang; South Korea	Robert Mearns; Canada
800 m C8	Robert Biancucci; Australia	Keith Pittman; United States	Javier Salmerón; Spain
1500 m 1A	Heinrich Koeberle; West Germany	Gunther Obert; West Germany	Bart Dodson; United States
1500 m 1B	Serge Raymond; Canada	Clayton Gerein; Canada	Peter Schmid; Switzerland
1500 m 1C	Jeff Worthington; United States	John Brewer; United States	Alan Dufty; Australia
1500 m 2	Heinz Frei; Switzerland	Paul Clark; Canada	Wolfgang Petersen; West Germany
1500 m 3	Lars Lofstrom; Sweden	Paul van Winkel; Belgium	Gregor Golombek; West Germany
1500 m 4	Farid Amarouche; France	Jean Francois Poitevin; France	Robert Courtney; United States
1500 m 5–6	Franz Nietlispach; Switzerland	John Anderson; United States	Jeff Adams; Canada
1500 m A1–3/A9/L2	Mustapha Badid; France	Daniel Wesley; Canada	Philippe Couprie; France
1500 m A6/A8–9/L4	Angel Marin; Spain	Kai Pirttijärvi; Finland	Sameh Ahmed; Egypt
1500 m B1	Robert Matthews; Great Britain	Terje Loevaas; Norway	Tofiri Kibuuka; Norway
1500 m B2	Mariano Ruiz; Spain	Noel Thatcher; Great Britain	Michel Pavon; France
1500 m B3	Anthony Hamilton; Great Britain	Farzat Timerboulatov; Soviet Union	Tyrone Branch; United States
1500 m C7	Benny Govaerts; Belgium	Rudolf Kocmut; Yugoslavia	Robert Mearns; Canada
1500 m C8	Ari Lehto; Finland	John McGuinness; Ireland	Stephen Syndercombe; Great Britain
3000 m cross country C6	James Sands; Great Britain	Dae Kwan Kim; South Korea	Monaam Elabed; Tunisia
5000 m cross country C7	Benny Govaerts; Belgium	Dieter Carius; West Germany	David Howe; Canada
5000 m cross country C8	Ari Lehto; Finland	Gerard McConnell; Great Britain	John McGuinness; Ireland
5000 m 1A	Heinrich Koeberle; West Germany	Hans Lubbering; West Germany	Gunther Obert; West Germany
5000 m 1B	Clayton Gerein; Canada	Jan-Owe Mattsson; Sweden	Peter Schmid; Switzerland
5000 m 1C	Jeff Worthington; United States	Johann Kastner; West Germany	Carmelo Addaris; Italy
5000 m 2	Wolfgang Petersen; West Germany	Heinz Frei; Switzerland	Errol Marklein; West Germany
5000 m 3	Paul van Winkel; Belgium	Gregor Golombek; West Germany	André Viger; Canada
5000 m 4	Farid Amarouche; France	Jean Francois Poitevin; France	Saúl Mendoza; Mexico
5000 m 5–6	Franz Nietlispach; Switzerland	Jose Manuel Rios; Mexico	Iwan van Breemen; Netherlands
5000 m A1–3/A9/L2	Mustapha Badid; France	Daniel Wesley; Canada	Kevin Orr; United States
5000 m A6/A8–9/L4	Angel Marin; Spain	Hyun Sik Hwang; South Korea	Slobodan Adzic; Yugoslavia
5000 m B1	Robert Matthews; Great Britain	Tofiri Kibuuka; Norway	Terje Loevaas; Norway
5000 m B2	Mariano Ruiz; Spain	Michel Pavon; France	Anatoly Pomykalov; Soviet Union
5000 m B3	Carlos Talbott; United States	Mark Farnell; Great Britain	Leamon Stansell; United States
10000 m 2	Heinz Frei; Switzerland	Wolfgang Petersen; West Germany	Jean-Marc Berset; Switzerland
10000 m 3	Gregor Golombek; West Germany	André Viger; Canada	Urs Scheidegger; Switzerland
10000 m 4	Jean Francois Poitevin; France	Farid Amarouche; France	Antti Dahlberg; Finland
10000 m 5	Iwan van Breemen; Netherlands	Jonathon Puffenberger; United States	Nezar Ahmad; Kuwait
10000 m A6/A8–9/L4	Hyun Sik Hwang; South Korea	Jari Naranen; Finland	Jean-Yves Arvier; France
Marathon 1A	Heinrich Koeberle; West Germany	Rainer Küschall; Switzerland	Bart Dodson; United States
Marathon 1B	Serge Raymond; Canada	Jan-Owe Mattsson; Sweden	Clayton Gerein; Canada
Marathon 1C	John Brewer; United States	Alan Dufty; Australia	Johann Kastner; West Germany
Marathon 2	Marc Quessy; Canada	Paul Clark; Canada	Michael Trujillo; United States
Marathon 3	André Viger; Canada	Urs Scheidegger; Switzerland	Phil Carpenter; United States
Marathon 4	Jean Francois Poitevin; France	Farid Amarouche; France	Rafael Ibarra; United States
Marathon 5-6	Jonathon Puffenberger; United States	Tom Foran; United States	Georg Schrattenecker; Austria
Marathon A1–3/A9/L1–2	Mustapha Badid; France	Philippe Couprie; France	Ted Vince; Canada
Marathon B1	Joerund Gaasemyr; Norway	David Jakubovich; Israel	Carlos Roberto Sestrem; Brazil
Marathon B2	Stephen Brunt; Great Britain	Paul Collet; France	David Mills; New Zealand
Marathon B3	Carlos Talbott; United States	Mark Farnell; Great Britain	Wieslaw Miech; Poland
4×100 m relay 1A–1C	United States (USA); Bart Dodson; William Furbish; Darrell Ray; Jeff Worthington	Australia (AUS); Richard Cordukes; Michael Desanto; Alan Dufty; Vincenzo Vallelonga	Italy (ITA); Carmelo Addaris; Gennaro Maisto; Rodolfo Rossi; Alvise de Vidi
4×100 m relay 2–6	West Germany (FRG); Robert Figl; Gregor Golombek; Errol Marklein; Wolfgang Petersen	South Korea (KOR); Duk Ho Hong; Byung Woo Kim; Bong Ho Lee; Min Ho Yu	United States (USA); Robert Courtney; Frank Epperson; Bob Gibson; Abu Yilla
4×100 m relay A2/A4–7	Australia (AUS); Adrian Lowe; Rodney Nugent; Nigel Parsons; Jason Smart	China (CHN); Zhongxing Qin; Xuewen Qiu; Chang Ting Sun; Shaomin Yang	United States (USA); Ronnie Alsup; Matthew Bulow; Rick Hoang; Dennis Oehler
4×100 m relay C7–8	South Korea (KOR); Duk Kwun Hong; Sung Kook Kang; Hoon Son; Soon Dal Song	United States (USA); Thomas Dietz; Keith Pittman; Scott Row; Gregoy Taylor	Hong Kong (HKG); Shing Chung Chan; Wai Hung Chan; Siu Hung Chang; Yiu Cheung Cheung
4×200 m relay 1A–1C	United States (USA); Bart Dodson; Russ Monroe; Jeff Worthington; Dylan Young	Switzerland (SUI); Daniel Joggi; Rainer Küschall; Peter Schmid; Eric Walter	Australia (AUS); Richard Cordukes; Michael Desanto; Alan Dufty; Vincenzo Vallelonga
4×200 m relay 2–6	West Germany (FRG); Robert Figl; Gregor Golombek; Errol Marklein; Wolfgang Petersen	Switzerland (SUI); Vince Cavicchia; Guido Muller; Franz Nietlispach; Urs Scheidegger	South Korea (KOR); Duk Ho Hong; Byung Woo Kim; Bong Ho Lee; Hee Sang Yu
4×400 m relay 2–6	West Germany (FRG); Robert Figl; Gregor Golombek; Wolfgang Petersen; Sigg Winfried	Switzerland (SUI); Jean-Marc Berset; Guido Muller; Franz Nietlispach; Urs Scheidegger	United States (USA); Phil Carpenter; Robert Courtney; Rafael Ibarra; Mike Trijillo
4×400 m relay A2/A4–7	Australia (AUS); Adrian Lowe; Rodney Nugent; Andrew O'Sullivan; Nigel Parsons	China (CHN); Zhongxing Qin; Xuewen Qiu; Chang Ting Sun; Hui Yun Wang	West Germany (FRG); Matthias Berg; Max Buchin; Axel Hecker; Jurgen Johann
High jump A2/A9	Arnold Boldt; Canada	Andreas Siegl; Austria	Gunther Beltiz; West Germany
High jump A4/A9	Ronnie Alsup; United States	Michael Hackett; Australia	James Enright; Canada
High jump A6/A8–9/L6	Nigel Coultas; Great Britain	Shaomin Yang; China	Rodney Nugent; Australia
High jump B1	Italo Sacchetto; Italy	Hadi Abdulaziz; Indonesia	Yukio Minani; Japan
High jump B2	Vadim Kalmykov; Soviet Union	Norbert Antlitz; West Germany	Masanobi Horiuchi; Japan
High jump B3	Oleg Chepel; Soviet Union	Hiroaki Nakamura; Japan	Danny de Meersman; Belgium
Long jump A2/A9	Albert Mead; United States	Arnold Boldt; Canada	Kerrod McGregor; Australia
Long jump A4/A9	Ronnie Alsup; United States	Chang Ting Sun; China	Matthew Bulow; United States
Long jump A6/A8–9/L6	Rodney Nugent; Australia	Shaomin Yang; China	Georgios Toptsis; Greece
Long jump B1	Mineho Ozaki; Japan	Antonio Delgado; Spain	Victor Riabochtan; Soviet Union
Long jump B2	Vadim Kalmykov; Soviet Union	Andre Asbury; United States	Yukio Mita; Japan
Long jump B3	Oleg Chepel; Soviet Union	Ulrich Striegel; West Germany	Simon Butler; Great Britain
Long jump C7	Michel Bapte; France	Antti Makinen; Finland	Timo Solmari; Finland
Long jump C8	Hoon Son; South Korea	Thomas Dietz; United States	Keith Pittman; United States
Triple jump A6/A8–9/L6	Rodney Nugent; Australia	Shaomin Yang; China	Zhongxing Qin; China
Triple jump B1	Mineho Ozaki; Japan	Sergei Sevastianov; Soviet Union	José Manuel Rodríguez; Spain
Triple jump B2	Vadim Kalmykov; Soviet Union	Yukio Mita; Japan	Ante Pehar; Yugoslavia
Triple jump B3	Ulrich Striegel; West Germany	Donko Angelov; Bulgaria	Shoichi Otsuka; Japan
Club throw 1A	Edund Weber; West Germany	José Daniel Haylan; Argentina	Paolo D'Agostini; Italy
Club throw C2	Se Ho Park; South Korea	Steven Varden; Great Britain	Thomas Leahy; Ireland
Club throw C4	Michael Walker; Great Britain	Norman Burns; Great Britain	Josef Fuchs; Austria
Club throw C5	Paul Williams; Great Britain	Denton Johnson; United States	Michael Quickert; West Germany
Club throw C6	Naoki Matsui; Japan	Tae Joon Kwon; South Korea	Fahed Al-Mutairi; Kuwait
Discus throw 1A	Edund Weber; West Germany	Jose Daniel Haylan; Argentina	Carlos Maslup; Argentina
Discus throw 1B	Richard Reelie; Canada	Douglas Heir; United States	Gabriel Diaz de Leon; United States
Discus throw 1C	Luiz Cláudio Pereira; Brazil	Siegmar Henker; West Germany	Grant Buchanan; New Zealand
Discus throw 2	John Twomey; Ireland	Gary Schaff; Canada	Bruce Wallrodt; Australia
Discus throw 3	Mokhtar Nourafshan; Iran	Stewart McKeown; Canada	Reza Chavoshi; Iran
Discus throw 4	Luis Grieb; Austria	Terry Giddy; Australia	Jacques Martin; Canada
Discus throw 5	Mohamed Abdulla Mohamed; Egypt	John Harris; Great Britain	Rudi van den Abbeele; France
Discus throw 6	Nachman Wolf; Israel	Ayad Al-Ali; Kuwait	Rene Ahrens; Australia
Discus throw A1–3/A9/L3	Walter Pichler; Austria	John Belanger; Canada	Hassan Samavati; Iran
Discus throw A2/A9	Kerrod McGregor; Australia	Roberto Simonazzi; West Germany	John Eden; Australia
Discus throw A3/A9	Ronan Tynan; Ireland	Bin Zhao; China	Hubert Burschgens; West Germany
Discus throw A4/A9	Zhen Yu Yao; China	Hans Joseflak; West Germany	Scott Ison; United States
Discus throw A6/A8–9/L6	Jerzy Dabrowski; Poland	Thomas Nuss; West Germany	Harri Jauhiainen; Finland
Discus throw B1	Richard Ruffalo; United States	Leroy Franks; United States	Pekka Kujala; Finland
Discus throw B2	Gueorgui Sakelarov; Bulgaria	Raimo Heikkinen; Finland	Andrzej Godlewski; Poland
Discus throw B3	Russell Short; Australia	Jonathan Ward; Great Britain	Garland Burris; United States
Discus throw C3	Paul Cassin; Ireland	Walter Spangler; West Germany	Zeljko Dereta; Yugoslavia
Discus throw C4	Michael Walker; Great Britain	Ragnar Anundsen; Norway	Eric Owens; United States
Discus throw C5	Paul Williams; Great Britain	Willem Noorduin; Netherlands	Giovanni Loiacono; Italy
Discus throw C7	Anton Scheiber; Austria	Timo Solmari; Finland	Ruud Sybes; Netherlands
Discus throw L5	Ian Hayden; Great Britain	Brian Lessiter; Great Britain	Miroslaw Waliszewski; Poland
Distance throw C1	Keung Ho Ku; South Korea	Keung Ho Lee; South Korea	Ji Hwan Yun; South Korea
Javelin throw 1B	Richard Reelie; Canada	Douglas Heir; United States	Christos Agourakis; Greece
Javelin throw 1C	Luiz Cláudio Pereira; Brazil	Siegmar Henker; West Germany	Milorad Nikolic; Yugoslavia
Javelin throw 2	Bruce Wallrodt; Australia	Matti Leinonen; Finland	Hermann Nortmann; West Germany
Javelin throw 3	Mats Laveborn; Sweden	Mikael Saleva; Finland	Marjan Peternelj; Yugoslavia
Javelin throw 4	Hadi Yar-Ahmadi; Iran	Jefferson Davis; Jamaica	Johann Schuhbauer; West Germany
Javelin throw 5	Javad Abdollahzadeh; Iran	Samson Mosoti; Kenya	Leslie Jones; Great Britain
Javelin throw 6	Adnan Al-Khulefi; Kuwait	Nachman Wolf; Israel	Aly Mohamed; Kuwait
Javelin throw A1–3/A9/L3	Slawomir Karpinski; Poland	John Belanger; Canada	John Jerome; United States
Javelin throw A2/A9	Jos van der Donk; Netherlands	Roberto Simonazzi; West Germany	Kerrod McGregor; Australia
Javelin throw A3/A9	Hubert Burschgens; West Germany	Sakul Kumtan; Thailand	Ronan Tynan; Ireland
Javelin throw A4/A9	Erkki Kasma; Finland	James Enright; Canada	Chang Ting Sun; China
Javelin throw A6/A8–9/L6	Harald Roth; Austria	Jerzy Dabrowski; Poland	Toshiaki Ogura; Japan
Javelin throw B1	Vytautas Girnius; Soviet Union	Timo Sulisalo; Finland	Mineho Ozaki; Japan
Javelin throw B2	Alexandre Mokhir; Soviet Union	Raimo Heikkinen; Finland	Andrzej Godlewski; Poland
Javelin throw B3	Russell Short; Australia	Jan Brzegowski; Poland	Andrei Kolyvanov; Soviet Union
Javelin throw C4	Michael Walker; Great Britain	Norman Burns; Great Britain	Ragnar Anundsen; Norway
Javelin throw C5	Paul Williams; Great Britain	Denton Johnson; United States	Michael Quickert; West Germany
Javelin throw C6	Tae Joon Kwon; South Korea	Claudio Nunes Silva; Brazil	Stefan Krieger; West Germany
Javelin throw C7	Antti Makinen; Finland	Jang Hwan Koh; South Korea	Knut Amundsen; Norway
Javelin throw L4	Ian Hayden; Great Britain	Scott Danberg; United States	Miroslaw Maliszewski; Poland
Javelin throw L5	Dirk Mimberg; West Germany	Ahmad Rezaei; Iran	Eric Laderval; France
Precision throw C1	Keung Ho Ku; South Korea	Jayesh Amin; United States	António Marques; Portugal
Precision throw C1	Keung Ho Ku; South Korea	Jayesh Amin; United States	João Alves; Portugal
Shot put 1A	Edund Weber; West Germany	Jose Daniel Haylan; Argentina	James Richardson; Great Britain
Shot put 1B	Richard Reelie; Canada	Douglas Heir; United States	Gabriel Diaz de Leon; United States
Shot put 1C	Luiz Cláudio Pereira; Brazil	Siegmar Henker; West Germany	Grant Buchanan; New Zealand
Shot put 2	Bruce Wallrodt; Australia	Kevan McNicholas; Great Britain	Mubarak Al-Enezi; Kuwait
Shot put 3	Mats Laveborn; Sweden	Mikael Saleva; Finland	Stewart McKeown; Canada
Shot put 4	Jacques Martin; Canada	Arnold Astrada; United States	Terence Hopkins; Great Britain
Shot put 5	Jacek Kowalik; Poland	Ernest Guild; Great Britain	Mohamed Abdulla Mohamed; Egypt
Shot put 6	Husain Al-Enezi; Kuwait	Nachman Wolf; Israel	Ayad Al-Ali; Kuwait
Shot put A1–3/A9/L3	Walter Pichler; Austria	John Jerome; United States	John Belanger; Canada
Shot put A2/A9	Roberto Simonazzi; West Germany	Istvan Nanasi; Hungary	Andrzej Zmitrowicz; Poland
Shot put A3/A9	Hubert Burschgens; West Germany	Ronan Tynan; Ireland	Bin Zhao; China
Shot put A4/A9	Yuichi Yamamoto; Japan	Soeparni Soeparni; Indonesia	Scott Ison; United States
Shot put A6/A8–9/L6	Jerzy Dabrowski; Poland	Toshiaki Ogura; Japan	Thomas Nuss; West Germany
Shot put B1	James Neppl; United States	Richard Ruffalo; United States	Pekka Kujala; Finland
Shot put B2	Gueorgui Sakelarov; Bulgaria	Urpo Vainio; Finland	Andrzej Godlewski; Poland
Shot put B3	Jonathan Ward; Great Britain	Denes Nagy; Hungary	Russell Short; Australia
Shot put C2	Se Ho Park; South Korea	Thomas Leahy; Ireland	Khaled Khaled; Kuwait
Shot put C3	Martin Costello; Ireland	Phillip Laing; United States	Walter Spangler; West Germany
Shot put C4	Michael Walker; Great Britain	Ragnar Anundsen; Norway	Gerard Naughton; Ireland
Shot put C5	Denton Johnson; United States	Paul Williams; Great Britain	Manfred Atteneder; Austria
Shot put C6	Alex Hermans; Belgium	Heinz Bohlander; West Germany	Sebastião Antônio Neto; Brazil
Shot put C7	Anton Scheiber; Austria	Timo Solmari; Finland	Ruud Sybes; Netherlands
Shot put C8	Marko Luukkanen; Finland	Michael McDevitt; United States	Thomas Dietz; United States
Shot put L4	Peter Hermann; West Germany	Ian Hayden; Great Britain	Brian Lessiter; Great Britain
Shot put L5	Dirk Mimberg; West Germany	Rainer Guhl; West Germany	Ali Asghar Hadizadeh; Iran
Kick ball C2	Michael McCormack; Ireland	Manuel Baltazar; Portugal	David Boland; Ireland
Slalom 1A	Khaled Al Saqer; Bahrain	Carlos Maslup; Argentina	Ali Alhasan; Bahrain
Slalom 1B	Akihiko Onodera; Japan	Eric Walter; Switzerland	Vincenzo Vallelonga; Australia
Slalom 1C	Kiichiro Hashiba; Japan	Tareq Al-Naser; Kuwait	Carmelo Addaris; Italy
Slalom 2	In Kwon Jung; South Korea	Graham Condon; New Zealand	Kazumi Kanazawa; Japan
Slalom 3	Seiji Hayashi; Japan	Takao Ishii; Japan	Takeshi Iwasaki; Japan
Slalom 4	Katsuaki Takemura; Japan	Rolf Johansson; Sweden	Yasuhiro Fujikawa; Japan
Slalom 5–6	Franz Nietlispach; Switzerland	Nezar Ahmad; Kuwait	Teruo Nozaki; Japan
Slalom C1	Henrik Jorgensen; Denmark	Terry Hudson; Great Britain	Terry Robinson; Canada
Slalom C2	Darrin Jordan; Ireland	David Osborn; United States	Mansoor Siddiqi; Denmark
Slalom C4–5	Eric Owens; United States	Norman Burns; Great Britain	Matthew van Eldik; Australia
Pentathlon 1C	Siegmar Henker; West Germany	Luiz Cláudio Pereira; Brazil	Christoph Etzlstorfer; Austria
Pentathlon 2	Hermann Nortmann; West Germany	Matti Leinonen; Finland	Kevin Saunders; United States
Pentathlon 3	Peter Weidkamp; West Germany	Josef Loisinger; Austria	Renato Misturini; Italy
Pentathlon 4	Walter Pfaller; Austria	Remi van Ophem; Belgium	Johann Schuhbauer; West Germany
Pentathlon 5	Rudi van den Abbeele; France	Eugen Weiberle; West Germany	John Harris; Great Britain
Pentathlon 6	Adnan Al-Khulefi; Kuwait	Nachman Wolf; Israel	Jorge Ernesto Varela; Mexico
Pentathlon A4/A9	Manfred Hartl; Austria	Bradley Thomas; Australia	Alessandro Kuris; Italy
Pentathlon B1	Vytautas Girnius; Soviet Union	Sergei Sevastianov; Soviet Union	Zbigniew Kubacki; Poland
Pentathlon B2	Vadim Kalmykov; Soviet Union	Alexandre Mokhir; Soviet Union	James Osmon; United States
Pentathlon B3	Oleg Chepel; Soviet Union	Hannu Argillander; Finland	Jonathan Ward; Great Britain

=== Women's events ===
Event	Gold	Silver	Bronze
100 m 1C	Leticia Torres; Mexico	Yolande Hansen; West Germany	Mary Thompson; United States
100 m 2	Francesca Porcellato; Italy	Brenda Zajac; United States	Dora Garcia; Mexico
100 m 3	Sabrina Bulleri; Italy	Debbi Kostelyk; Canada	Min Ok Lee; South Korea
100 m 4	Charla Ramsey; United States	Cecilia Vazquez; Mexico	Marie-Line Pollet; Belgium
100 m 5–6	Juana Soto; Mexico		Deahnne McIntyre; Australia
100 m 5–6	Martine Prieur; France		Deahnne McIntyre; Australia
100 m A1–3/A9/L2	Min Ae Baek; South Korea	Valerie Deconde; France	Linda Hamilton; Canada
100 m A4/A9	Claude Poumerol; Canada	Reinhild Möller; West Germany	Karin Gambal; Austria
100 m A6/A8–9/L4	Petra Buddelmeyer; West Germany	Jessica Sachse; West Germany	Lynette Wildeman; Canada
100 m B1	Purificacion Santamarta; Spain	Bang Wol Kim; South Korea	Rossella Inverni; Italy
100 m B2	Raissa Jouravliova; Soviet Union	Adria Santos; Brazil	Rima Batalova; Soviet Union
100 m B3	Jihong Zhao; China	Lesli Mancktelow; New Zealand	Helena Leja; Poland
100 m C6	Zita Andrey; Switzerland	Marcia Malsar; Brazil	Sylvie Sauve; Canada
100 m C7	Theresa Ward; Ireland	Siw Kristin Vestengen; Norway	Leslie Roth; United States
100 m C8	Alma Rock; Ireland	Maki Okada; Japan	Camilla McMahon; Ireland
200 m 1C	Leticia Torres; Mexico	Yolande Hansen; West Germany	Jean Waters; United States
200 m 2	Brenda Zajac; United States	Francesca Porcellato; Italy	Ann Walters; United States
200 m 3	Sabrina Bulleri; Italy	Patricia Durkin; United States	Sherry Ann Ramsey; United States
200 m 4	Cecilia Vazquez; Mexico	Marie-Line Pollet; Belgium	Charla Ramsey; United States
200 m 5–6	Deahnne McIntyre; Australia	Juana Soto; Mexico	Jean Driscoll; United States
200 m A1–3/A9/L2	Min Ae Baek; South Korea	Valerie Deconde; France	Linda Hamilton; Canada
200 m A4/A9	Reinhild Möller; West Germany	Claude Poumerol; Canada	Karin Gambal; Austria
200 m A6/A8–9/L4	Petra Buddelmeyer; West Germany	Jessica Sachse; West Germany	Lynette Wildeman; Canada
200 m C7	Siw Kristin Vestengen; Norway	Maria Albertina Cabral; Portugal	Jacquelyn Payne; United States
200 m C8	Sylvie Bergeron; Canada	Tiffani McCoy; United States	Annette Saeger; West Germany
400 m 1C	Leticia Torres; Mexico	Yolande Hansen; West Germany	Jean Waters; United States
400 m 2	Ingrid Lauridsen; Denmark	Yvette McLellan; Australia	Ann Walters; United States
400 m 3	Patricia Durkin; United States	Daniela Jutzeler; Switzerland	Tanni Grey; Great Britain
400 m 4	Connie Hansen; Denmark	Cecilia Vazquez; Mexico	Maria Hill; United States
400 m 5–6	Juana Soto; Mexico	Deahnne McIntyre; Australia	Jean Driscoll; United States
400 m A1–3/A9/L2	Valerie Deconde; France	Linda Hamilton; Canada	Min Ae Baek; South Korea
400 m A6/A8–9/L4	Petra Buddelmeyer; West Germany	Tanja Tervonen; Finland	Jessica Sachse; West Germany
400 m B1	Tamara Pankova; Soviet Union	Purificacion Santamarta; Spain	Rossella Inverni; Italy
400 m B2	Rima Batalova; Soviet Union	Adria Santos; Brazil	Anelise Hermany; Brazil
400 m B3	Jihong Zhao; China	Helena Leja; Poland	Danute Chmidek; Soviet Union
400 m C7	Siw Kristin Vestengen; Norway	Maria Albertina Cabral; Portugal	Sonja Atkins; Canada
400 m C8	Maki Okada; Japan	Sylvie Bergeron; Canada	Annette Saeger; West Germany
800 m 1C	Leticia Torres; Mexico	Florence Gossiaux; France	Yolande Hansen; West Germany
800 m 2	Ingrid Lauridsen; Denmark	Ann Cody-Morris; United States	Brenda Zajac; United States
800 m 3	Candace Cable-Brooks; United States	Sherry Ann Ramsey; United States	Daniela Jutzeler; Switzerland
800 m 4	Connie Hansen; Denmark	Tracy Miller; United States	Kay McShane; Ireland
800 m A1–3/A9/L2	Jennette Jansen; Netherlands	Linda Hamilton; Canada	Valerie Deconde; France
800 m B1	Tamara Pankova; Soviet Union	Rossella Inverni; Italy	Refija Okic; Yugoslavia
800 m B2	Rima Batalova; Soviet Union	Anelise Hermany; Brazil	Paige McClean; United States
800 m B3	Patti Egensteiner; United States	Danute Chmidek; Soviet Union	Stephanie Lacour; United States
800 m C7	Susan Moucha; United States	Norma Lorincz; Canada	Racquel Head; Canada
800 m C8	Maki Okada; Japan	Barbara Buchan; United States	Annette Saeger; West Germany
1500 m 1C	Yolande Hansen; West Germany	Leticia Torres; Mexico	Monique Jannette; United States
1500 m 2	Margit Quell; West Germany	Ann Cody-Morris; United States	Ingrid Lauridsen; Denmark
1500 m 3	Candace Cable-Brooks; United States	Sherry Ann Ramsey; United States	Daniela Jutzeler; Switzerland
1500 m 4	Connie Hansen; Denmark	Tracy Miller; United States	Maria Hill; United States
1500 m A1–3/A9/L2	Jennette Jansen; Netherlands	Sacajuwea Hunter; United States	Linda Hamilton; Canada
1500 m B1	Tamara Pankova; Soviet Union	Rossella Inverni; Italy	Refija Okic; Yugoslavia
3000 m A1–3/A9/L2	Jennette Jansen; Netherlands	Sacajuwea Hunter; United States	Myung Soon Kang; South Korea
5000 m 2	Margit Quell; West Germany	Ann Cody-Morris; United States	Ingrid Lauridsen; Denmark
5000 m 4	Connie Hansen; Denmark	Tracy Miller; United States	Chris de Craene; Belgium
10000 m 2	Margit Quell; West Germany	Ann Cody-Morris; United States	Ingrid Lauridsen; Denmark
Marathon 2	Tami Oothoudt; United States	Ann Walters; United States	Patricia Hill; New Zealand
Marathon 3	Candace Cable-Brooks; United States	Sherry Ann Ramsey; United States	Itsuko Maeda; Japan
Marathon 4	Connie Hansen; Denmark	Tracy Miller; United States	Kay McShane; Ireland
4×100 m relay 2–6	Italy (ITA); Milena Balsamo; Sabrina Bulleri; Francesca Porcellato; Tina Varano	United States (USA); Jean Driscoll; Patricia Durkin; Kristine Graham; Charla Ramsey	Hong Kong (HKG); Kam Tim Chan; Ping Cho; Kam Mui Ng; Mei Lan Wong
4×200 m relay 2–6	United States (USA); Candace Cable-Brooks; Jean Driscoll; Patricia Durkin; Brenda Zajac	Mexico (MEX); Araceli Castro; Dora Garcia; Juana Soto; Cecilia Vazquez	Italy (ITA); Milena Balsamo; Sabrina Bulleri; Francesca Porcellato; Cinzia Pozzobon
4×400 m relay 2–6	United States (USA); Candace Cable-Brooks; Sherry Ann Ramsey; Ann Walters; Brenda Zajac	Australia (AUS); Meredith Jones; Deahnne McIntyre; Yvette McLellan; Julie Russell	Italy (ITA); Milena Balsamo; Francesca Porcellato; Cinzia Pozzobon; Tina Varano
Long jump B1	Joke van Rijswijk; Netherlands	Purificacion Santamarta; Spain	Lori Bennett; United States
Long jump B2	Raissa Jouravliova; Soviet Union	Mariano Susitz; Austria	Mona Ullmann; Norway
Long jump B3	Patti Egensteiner; United States	Jihong Zhao; China	Lesli Mancktelow; New Zealand
Club throw C3	Susan Edwards; United States	Lorraine Gallagher; Ireland	Anne Woffinden; Great Britain
Discus throw 1B	Isabel Barr; Great Britain	Isabel Bustamante; Puerto Rico	Minette Wilson; Jamaica
Discus throw 2	Christine Rupert; United States	Adelah Al-Roumi; Kuwait	Christina Dodrill; Ireland
Discus throw 3	Laura Schwanger; United States	Cathy Dunne-Fitzpatrick; Ireland	Julie Russell; Australia
Discus throw 4	Kathryne Lynne Carlton; United States	Marie-Line Pollet; Belgium	Halina Sobolewska; Poland
Discus throw 5	Elka Munker; West Germany	Sylvia Grant; Jamaica	Martine Prieur; France
Discus throw A6/A8-9/L6	Britta Jaenicke; West Germany	Zofia Mielech; Poland	Barbel Zielonka; West Germany
Discus throw B1	Denise Ross; Great Britain	Meijie Song; China	Hildegard Monschein; Austria
Discus throw B2	Nada Vuksanovic; Yugoslavia	Raissa Jouravliova; Soviet Union	Jacqueline Toews; Canada
Discus throw C3	Susan Edwards; United States	Lorraine Gallagher; Ireland	Anne Trotman; Great Britain
Discus throw C7	Joanne Bouw; Canada	Ann-Gael de Saint; Belgium	Zita Andrey; Switzerland
Distance throw C1	Olga Pinto; Portugal	Tracy D'Angelo; United States	Kerry Taylor; Great Britain
Javelin throw 1B	Minette Wilson; Jamaica	Isabel Bustamante; Puerto Rico	Isabel Newstead; Great Britain
Javelin throw 2	Adelah Al-Roumi; Kuwait	Grace Muteti; Kenya	Christine Rupert; United States
Javelin throw 3	Laura Schwanger; United States	Lucy Wanjiru Njorogg; Kenya	Julie Russell; Australia
Javelin throw 4	Halina Sobolewska; Poland	Kathryne Lynne Carlton; United States	Henrietta Davis; Jamaica
Javelin throw 5	Zipora Rubin; Israel	Sylvia Grant; Jamaica	Elka Munker; West Germany
Javelin throw A6/A8-9/L6	Britta Jaenicke; West Germany	Donna Smith; Australia	Jessica Sachse; West Germany
Javelin throw B1	Brigitte Otto-Lange; West Germany	Meijie Song; China	Hildegard Monschein; Austria
Javelin throw B2	Mona Ullmann; Norway	Heike Madler; West Germany	Maria Sobiech; Poland
Javelin throw C3	Susan Edwards; United States	Karen Gill; Australia	Anne Trotman; Great Britain
Javelin throw C7	Joanne Bouw; Canada	Theresa Ward; Ireland	Deborah Hearn; United States
Precision throw C1	Olga Pinto; Portugal	Kerry Taylor; Great Britain	Emilia Costa; Portugal
Shot put 1B	Isabel Bustamante; Puerto Rico	Isabel Barr; Great Britain	Minette Wilson; Jamaica
Shot put 2	Adelah Al-Roumi; Kuwait	Christina Dodrill; Ireland	Christine Rupert; United States
Shot put 3	Laura Schwanger; United States	Julie Russell; Australia	Lucy Wanjiru Njorogg; Kenya
Shot put 4	Milka Milinkovic; Yugoslavia	Kathryne Lynne Carlton; United States	Marie-Line Pollet; Belgium
Shot put 5	Dorothy Ripley; Great Britain	Elka Munker; West Germany	Zipora Rubin; Israel
Shot put B1	Patricia Molseed; Australia	Denise Ross; Great Britain	Trish Lovegrove; Canada
Shot put B2	Nada Vuksanovic; Yugoslavia	Mona Ullmann; Norway	Ljiliana Lubisic; Canada
Shot put C3	Susan Edwards; United States	Kathleen Barletta; United States	Anne Trotman; Great Britain
Shot put C4	Ans Bouwmeester; Netherlands	Martina Willms; West Germany	Marjorie Lynch; Canada
Shot put C7	Joanne Bouw; Canada	Ann-Gael de Saint; Belgium	Birte Oddny Larsen; Norway
Slalom 3	Yumi Ito; Japan	Michiyo Watanuki; Japan	Patricia Hill; New Zealand
Slalom 4	Rumi Sakauchi; Japan	Hyun Hee Cho; South Korea	Schiharu Imaizumi; Japan
Slalom C1	Kerry Taylor; Great Britain	Carol Johnson; Great Britain	Lee Graybeal; United States
Pentathlon 3	Laura Schwanger; United States	Julie Russell; Australia	Cathy Dunne-Fitzpatrick; Ireland
Pentathlon 4	Marie-Line Pollet; Belgium	Kathryne Lynne Carlton; United States	Halina Sobolewska; Poland
Pentathlon 5–6	Martine Prieur; France	Sylvia Grant; Jamaica	Zipora Rubin; Israel
Pentathlon B2	Raissa Jouravliova; Soviet Union	Mona Ullmann; Norway	Jaana Oikarainen; Finland

=== Mixed events ===
Event	Gold	Silver	Bronze
4×100 m relay C2–3	Ireland (IRL); David Boland; Martin Costello; Lorraine Gallagher; Darrin Jordan	United States (USA); Lee Jonas; Phillip Laing; David Osborn; Rene Rivera	Canada (CAN); Jamie Bone; Andre Lavallee; Laura Misciagna; David Severin
