= Puerto Rico at the Paralympics =

- IPC code: PUR
- NPC: Comite Paralimpico de Puerto Rico
- Medals Ranked 102nd: Gold 1 Silver 2 Bronze 4 Total 7

Summer appearances
- 1988; 1992; 1996; 2000; 2004; 2008; 2012; 2016; 2020; 2024

Winter appearances
- 2022

Puerto Rico made its Paralympic Games début at the 1988 Summer Paralympics in Seoul, with a delegation of twelve competitors in archery, athletics, shooting and table tennis. It has participated in every subsequent edition of the Summer Paralympics. The country is set to first compete at the Winter Paralympics in 2022.

Puerto Ricans have won a total of six Paralympic medals: a gold, two silver and three bronze. During their inaugural participation in 1988, Puerto Rico collected three medals: a gold and two silver. All three were won by Isabel Bustamante in field events (shot put, discus and javelin), in category 1B. The country then had to wait until 2000 for its next medal, when Alexis Pizarro took bronze in the men's shot put (F57 category). He was Puerto Rico's sole medallist again in 2004, this time with a bronze in the javelin. Most recent, Nilda Gomez Lopez won bronze in the women's air rifle (standing event, category SH1) in 2008.

== Medal tallies ==
=== Summer Paralympics ===
Event	Gold	Silver	Bronze	Total	Ranking
1988 Summer Paralympics	1	2	0	3	36th
1992 Summer Paralympics	0	0	1	1	55th
1996 Summer Paralympics	0	0	0	0	—
2000 Summer Paralympics	0	0	1	1	64th
2004 Summer Paralympics	0	0	1	1	73rd
2008 Summer Paralympics	0	0	1	1	69th
2012 Summer Paralympics	0	0	0	0	—
2016 Summer Paralympics	0	0	0	0	—
2020 Summer Paralympics	0	0	0	0	—
2024 Summer Paralympics	0	0	0	0	—
Total	1	2	4	7	

== Medalists ==
Medal	Name	Games	Sport	Event
Gold	Isabel Bustamante	(South Korea) 1988 Seoul	Athletics	Women's shot put 1B
Silver	Isabel Bustamante	(South Korea) 1988 Seoul	Athletics	Women's discus throw 1B
Silver	Isabel Bustamante	(South Korea) 1988 Seoul	Athletics	Women's javelin throw 1B
Bronze	Alexis Pizarro	(Australia) 2000 Sydney	Athletics	Men's shot put F57
Bronze	Alexis Pizarro	(Greece) 2004 Athens	Athletics	Men's javelin throw F58
Bronze	Nilda Gomez Lopez	(China) 2008 Beijing	Shooting	Women's 10m air rifle standing SH1

== See also ==
- Puerto Rico at the Olympics
