= 1991 London Marathon =

11th London Marathon

11th London Marathon
- Venue: London, United Kingdom
- Date: 21 April 1991

Champions
- Men: Yakov Tolstikov (2:09:17)
- Women: Katrin Dörre-Heinig (2:29:39)
- Wheelchair men: Farid Amarouche (1:52:52)
- Wheelchair women: Connie Hansen (2:04:40)

The 1991 London Marathon was the 11th running of the annual marathon race in London, United Kingdom, which took place on Sunday, 21 April. The elite men's race was won by Soviet athlete Yakov Tolstikov in a time of 2:09:17 hours and the women's race was won by Portugal's Rosa Mota in 2:26:14. Tolstikov's run was a Soviet record, which was never bettered as the country collapsed at the end of 1991.

The elite race featured high levels of international participation that year as it played host to the 1991 World Marathon Cup, where Great Britain won the men's team race and the Soviet Union won the women's team race.

In the wheelchair races, France's Farid Amarouche (1:52:52) and Denmark's Connie Hansen (2:04:40) set course records in the men's and women's divisions, respectively. This was the first time that the winning time in the women's wheelchair race surpassed that of both able-bodied races.

In the mass race, around 79,000 people applied to enter the race, of which 33,485 had their applications accepted and around 24,500 started the race. A total of 23,435 runners finished the race.

== Results ==
=== Men ===
Position	Athlete	Nationality	Time
1st place, gold medalist(s)	Yakov Tolstikov	Soviet Union	2:09:17
2nd place, silver medalist(s)	Manuel Matias	Portugal	2:10:21
3rd place, bronze medalist(s)	Jan Huruk	Poland	2:10:21
4	Dave Long	United Kingdom	2:10:30
5	Joaquim Pinheiro	Portugal	2:10:38
6	Alfredo Shahanga	Tanzania	2:11:20
7	Steve Brace	United Kingdom	2:11:45
8	Peter Maher	Ireland	2:11:46
9	Jean-Luc Assemat	France	2:11:49
10	Salvatore Bettiol	Italy	2:11:53
11	Konrad Dobler	Germany	2:11:57
12	José Esteban Montiel	Spain	2:11:59
13	Tekeye Gebrselassie	Ethiopia	2:12:05
14	Alessio Faustini	Italy	2:12:12
15	Marco Gozzano	Italy	2:12:26
16	David Buzza	United Kingdom	2:12:37
17	Isidro Rico	Mexico	2:12:38
18	Slawomir Gurny	Poland	2:12:39
19	Marcelino Crisanto	Mexico	2:12:42
20	Hugh Jones	United Kingdom	2:12:46
21	Carlos Ayala	Mexico	2:12:51
22	Luis Soares	France	2:12:53
23	Diego García	Spain	2:12:54
24	Pascal Zilliox	France	2:12:59
25	Belayneh Tadesse	Ethiopia	2:13:09
26	Wiesław Perszke	Poland	2:13:12
27	Takeshi So	Japan	2:13:15
28	Peter Daenens	Belgium	2:13:16
29	Vicente Antón	Spain	2:13:38
30	Sam Carey	United Kingdom	2:13:54
31	José Carlos da Silva	Brazil	2:14:11
32	Allister Hutton	United Kingdom	2:14:13
33	Mohamed Kamel Selmi	Algeria	2:14:20
—	Gelindo Bordin	Italy	DNF
—	Bill Reifsnyder	United States	DNF
—	Carl Thackery	United Kingdom	DNF
—	Delmir Alves Dos Santos	Brazil	DNF
—	Suleiman Nyambui	Tanzania	DNF

=== Women ===
Position	Athlete	Nationality	Time
1st place, gold medalist(s)	Rosa Mota	Portugal	2:26:14
2nd place, silver medalist(s)	Francie Larrieu Smith	United States	2:27:35
3rd place, bronze medalist(s)	Valentina Yegorova	Soviet Union	2:28:18
4	Katrin Dörre-Heinig	Germany	2:28:57
5	Maria Rebelo	France	2:29:04
6	Renata Kokowska	Poland	2:30:12
7	Ramilya Burangulova	Soviet Union	2:30:41
8	Naomi Watanabe	Japan	2:31:23
9	Tatyana Zuyeva	Soviet Union	2:31:23
10	Anna Villani	Italy	2:31:26
11	Irina Bogacheva	Soviet Union	2:31:35
12	Antonella Bizioli	Italy	2:32:30
13	Laura Fogli	Italy	2:32:41
14	Mari Tanigawa	Japan	2:33:16
15	Sissel Grottenberg	Norway	2:33:21
16	Christel Rogiers	Belgium	2:33:41
17	Ria Van Landeghem	Belgium	2:33:49
18	Joy Smith	United States	2:34:20
19	Mary O'Connor	New Zealand	2:34:31
20	Sally Ellis	United Kingdom	2:34:42
21	Véronique Marot	United Kingdom	2:34:46
22	Françoise Bonnet	France	2:34:49
23	Izabela Zatorska	Poland	2:34:55
24	Marie-Hélène Ohier	France	2:34:59
25	Kerstin Pressler	Germany	2:35:09
26	Sally Eastall	United Kingdom	2:36:19
27	Anna Rybicka	Poland	2:36:41
28	Birgit Jerschabek	Germany	2:36:48
29	Jocelyne Villeton	France	2:37:04
30	Dominique Rembert	France	2:37:05
31	Lidia Camberg	Poland	2:37:13
32	Terry Adams	Switzerland	2:37:32
33	Sylvie Laville	France	2:37:51
—	Dorthe Rasmussen	Denmark	DNF
—	Wendy Breed	New Zealand	DNF

=== Wheelchair men ===
Position	Athlete	Nationality	Time
1st place, gold medalist(s)	Farid Amarouche	France	1:52:52
2nd place, silver medalist(s)	Bo Lindkvist	Sweden	1:52:55
3rd place, bronze medalist(s)	Jean-Francois Poitevin	France	1:52:57
4	Daniel Wesley	Canada	1:52:59
5	Håkan Ericsson	Sweden	1:53:02
6	David Holding	United Kingdom	1:54:39
7	Christian Pickernell	Australia	2:04:11
8	Doug Gray	United Kingdom	2:04:51
9	Ivan Newman	United Kingdom	2:04:55
10	Rob Wickham	Zimbabwe	2:05:01

=== Wheelchair women ===
Position	Athlete	Nationality	Time
1st place, gold medalist(s)	Connie Hansen	Denmark	2:04:40
2nd place, silver medalist(s)	Rose Hill	United Kingdom	2:21:49
3rd place, bronze medalist(s)	Tanni Grey	United Kingdom	2:38:42
4	Tracy Lewis	United Kingdom	2:45:33
5	Yvonne Holloway	United Kingdom	2:51:47
