= Athletics at the 1988 Summer Paralympics – Men's marathon 1B =

Men's marathon 1B at the VIII Paralympic Games
- Paralympic Athletics
- Competitors: 7 from 5 nations

Medalists
1st place, gold medalist(s)		Serge Raymond	Canada
2nd place, silver medalist(s)		Jan-Owe Mattsson	Sweden
3rd place, bronze medalist(s)		Clayton Gerein	Canada

The Men's marathon 1B was a wheelchair marathon event in athletics at the 1988 Summer Paralympics. The race was won by Serge Raymond.

== Results ==
Place	Athlete	Time
1	Serge Raymond (CAN)	2:07:47
2	Jan-Owe Mattsson (SWE)	2:08:08
3	Clayton Gerein (CAN)	2:20:32
4	Peter Carruthers (GBR)	2:23:30
5	Chris Schaefer (USA)	2:25:08
6	Peter Schmid (SUI)	2:28:45
7	Douglas Grant (CAN)	2:42:41

== See also ==
- Marathon at the Paralympics
