= Puerto Rico at the 2004 Summer Paralympics =

- IPC code: PUR
- NPC: Comite Paralimpico de Puerto Rico

in Athens
- Competitors: 2 in 2 sports
- Flag bearer: Alexis Pizarro
- Medals Ranked 73rd: Gold 0 Silver 0 Bronze 1 Total 1

Summer Paralympics appearances (overview)
- 1988; 1992; 1996; 2000; 2004; 2008; 2012; 2016; 2020; 2024

Puerto Rico competed at the 2004 Summer Paralympics in Athens, Greece. The team included two athletes. Competitors from Puerto Rico won one bronze medal to finish 73rd in the medal table.

== Medallists ==
Medal	Name	Sport	Event
Bronze	Alexis Pizarro	Athletics	Men's javelin throw F58

== Sports ==
=== Athletics ===
==== Men's field ====
Athlete	Class	Event	Final		
Athlete	Class	Event	Result	Points	Rank
Alexis Pizarro	F58	Discus	51.80	-	4
Alexis Pizarro	F58	Javelin	46.60	-	3rd place, bronze medalist(s)
Alexis Pizarro	F58	Shot put	13.70	-	5

=== Shooting ===
==== Women ====
Athlete	Event	Qualification		Final		
Athlete	Event	Score	Rank	Score	Total	Rank
Nilda Gómez López	Mixed 10m air rifle prone SH1	586	45	did not advance		
Nilda Gómez López	Mixed 50m rifle prone SH1	DNF		did not advance		
Nilda Gómez López	Women's 10m air rifle standing SH1	377	14	did not advance		
Nilda Gómez López	Women's 50m rifle 3 positions SH1	519	10	did not advance		

== See also ==
- Puerto Rico at the Paralympics
- Puerto Rico at the 2004 Summer Olympics
