= Minifie =

Minifie is a surname. Notable people with the surname include:

- Colby Minifie (born 1992), American actress
- Margaret Minifie (1734–1803), English novelist
- Richard Minifie (1898–1969), Australian fighter pilot
- Stuart Minifie (born 20th century), New Zealand Paralympian
