= Peter Carruthers =

Peter Carruthers may refer to:

- Peter Carruthers (philosopher) (born 1952), professor of philosophy
- Peter A. Carruthers (1935–1997), physicist
- Peter Carruthers (figure skater) (born 1959), Olympic figure skater
- Peter Carruthers (athlete) (1949–2019), British wheelchair racer
