= Chris De Craene =

Belgian paralympic athlete

Sport
- Country: Belgium
- Sport: Paralympic athletics Paralympic swimming
Medal record
Paralympic athletics
Representing Belgium
Paralympic Games
Silver medal – second place	1984 Stoke Mandeville/New York	400m 4
Bronze medal – third place	1984 Stoke Mandeville/New York	200m 4
Bronze medal – third place	1988 Seoul	5000m 4

Chris De Craene is a Belgian paralympic athlete and para swimmer. She competed at the 1980, 1984, 1988 and 1992 Summer Paralympics. She won three medals, one silver and two bronze.

== Career ==
At the 1980 Summer Paralympics in Arnhem, she competed in women's 100 meters freestyle 4, women's 100 m backstroke 4, and women's 100 m breaststroke 4.

At the 1984 Summer Paralympics in New York, she won a silver medal in women's 400 meters 4, and bronze medal in women's 200 meters 4.

At the 1988 Summer Paralympics in Seoul, she won a bronze medal in women's 5000 meters 4. She competed in women's 800 meters 4, finishing fifth.

At the 1992 Summer Paralympics in Barcelona, she competed in women's 100 meters TW4, women's 200 meters TW4, and women's 400 meters TW4.
