= Jeff Worthington =

American paralympic athlete

Personal information
- Born: April 29, 1961 Atlantic, Iowa, U.S.
- Died: June 1, 2023 (aged 62)

Sport
- Country: United States
- Sport: Para-athletics
Medal record
Representing United States
Paralympic Games
Para-athletics
Gold medal – first place	1988 Seoul	Men's 400 m 1C
Gold medal – first place	1988 Seoul	Men's 800 m 1C
Gold medal – first place	1988 Seoul	Men's 1500 m 1C
Gold medal – first place	1988 Seoul	Men's 5000 m 1C
Gold medal – first place	1988 Seoul	Men's 4×100 m relay 1A–1C
Gold medal – first place	1988 Seoul	Men's 4×200 m relay 1A–1C

Jeff Worthington (April 29, 1961 – June 1, 2023) was an American paralympic athlete. He competed at the 1988 Summer Paralympics.

== Biography ==
Worthington was born in Atlantic, Iowa. He was studying at Creighton University when he was involved in a car accident leading to a spinal cord injury in 1981. He completed his rehabilitation at Craig Hospital in Colorado. After his injury, he transferred to Arizona State where he got involved in wheelchair sports. He later moved to Colorado Springs, Colorado where he trained for the Paralympics. He had met Paralympian athlete John Brewer in the 1980s and adopted Brewer’s pushing technique.

Worthington competed at the 1988 Summer Paralympics, competing in athletics. He won the gold medal in the men's 400m 1C event, and also won gold in the men's 800m 1C event, with Brewer finishing second. He also won individual gold medals in the men's 1500m 1C event. and the men's 5000m 1C event, and team golds in the men's 4×100m relay 1A–1C and the men's 4×200m relay 1A–1C.
