= Puerto Rico at the 2000 Summer Paralympics =

- IPC code: PUR
- NPC: Comite Paralimpico de Puerto Rico

in Sydney
- Competitors: 3 in 1 sport
- Medals Ranked 64th: Gold 0 Silver 0 Bronze 1 Total 1

Summer Paralympics appearances (overview)
- 1988; 1992; 1996; 2000; 2004; 2008; 2012; 2016; 2020; 2024

There were 2 female and 1 male athletes representing the country at the 2000 Summer Paralympics.

== Medallists ==
Medal	Name	Sport	Event
Bronze	Alexis Pizarro	Athletics	Men's shot put F57

== See also ==
- Puerto Rico at the 2000 Summer Olympics
- Puerto Rico at the Paralympics

== Bibliography ==
- International Paralympic Committee (2000). "Appendix C: Athlete Numbers - By Delegation". Sydney 2000 Paralympic Games Post Games Report. Sydney.
