= John Harris (wheelchair athlete) =

Paralympian athlete from Wales

Personal information
- Full name: John Harris
- Nationality: British
- Born: 1945 (age 80–81) Sebastopol, Wales

Sport
- Country: Great Britain
- Sport: Athletics
- Events: Discus; Pentathlon; Javelin throw

Achievements and titles
- Paralympic finals: 1980; 1984; 1988; 1992; 1996
Medal record
Track and field (athletics)
Representing Great Britain
Paralympic Games
Gold medal – first place	1984 Stoke Mandeville	Discus – 5
Silver medal – second place	1988 Seoul	Discus – 5
Bronze medal – third place	1988 Seoul	Pentathlon

John Harris (born 1945) is a former Paralympic athlete from Wales competing mainly in category 5 throwing events. In 1984 he became the world record holder in the discus winning gold at the Summer Paralympics, following this with silver in the discus and bronze in the Pentathlon four years later.

== Career history ==
Harris was born in Sebastopol, Torfaen, a suburb of Pontypool in south Wales. A keen athlete as a youth, Harris was involved in gymnastics, rugby union and boxing. At the age of 18, Harris was on holiday at a Butlins holiday camp when he fell 18 metres from a big wheel resulting in the paralysis of his legs. The injury left him in hospital for five months, and after his release he "wasted the next three years in the pub".

Harris' involvement in parasports began when a friend persuaded him to attend a gym in an attempt to improve his fitness and give him focus. Harris then joined a paraplegic sports club and showed promise as a competitor after winning multiple events at a local sport event. His progress was noticed and the next year he was selected for the 1980 Summer Paralympics in Arnhem in the Netherlands. Harris entered three events, the category 5 discus and shot put and the 85 kg Light-heavyweight weightlifting, but failed to medal.

Four years later Harris was back in the Great Britain team at the 1984 Summer Paralympics. Harris originally decided to not apply for the team, after being disgusted at what he saw was the poor treatment of Paralympic athletes in comparison to their Olympic counterparts. He believed that Los Angeles should not have been allowed to pull out of hosting the Paralympic Games in 1984, but was talked around to taking part by a friend. At the Games, held at short notice at Stoke Mandeville Stadium, England, Harris was entered for the discus, shot put and javelin. Before taking part in the events, he was chosen to take the Paralympic Oath on behalf of all the athletes, an event he described as a "phenomenal honour". Although Harris did not finish in the top three in either javelin or shot put, his main focus for a medal was the discus. Before his final attempt he was sitting in sixth place, but his Paralympic record breaking throw gave him the gold medal.

Harris states that his outlook to life changed after the games, becoming less self-centered and in 1986 he joined up with his training partner and good friend Chris Hallam, who was also an outstanding Paralympic athlete having won gold in the pool at Stoke Mandeville. The two decided to raise funds for, and awareness of, disability sport by taking part in a 400-mile wheelchair trip around Wales in just 11 days. This led to a further fund raising event in 1997 when the two men completed 600-mile in 37 days. The funds they raised allowed for the building of national centre for disability sport to be built at the University of Wales Institute, at the Cyncoed Campus site.

In 1988 Harris took part in his third Summer Paralympics, joining the Great Britain team when they travelled to Seoul. He entered two events, the category 5–6 pentathlon and the discus. In the discus he threw 34.98m, to take silver, 1.70m behind the eventual winner Egypt's Mohamed Abdulla Mohamed. He finished fourth in the pentathlon, but was later awarded the bronze medal. (Note: Although the Paralympic record of the Pentathlon finals state that Harris finished fourth, in contemporary reports Harris is recorded as winning the bronze in the Seoul Pentathlon which is supported by images of Harris showing his three medals including a bronze and silver Seoul medal here.)

Harris took part in two more Summer Paralympics though he did not medal again. At the 1992 Games in Barcelona he competed in the javelin, pentathlon and 4 × 100 m relay, while in 1996 he represented Britain in the Pentathlon.

== Awards and honours ==
Harris was the subject of This Is Your Life in 1986 when he was surprised by Eamonn Andrews.

In 2013 Harris was inducted into the Welsh Sports Hall of Fame.

== Footnotes ==
Notes
