= Marie-Line Pollet =

Belgian Paralympic athlete

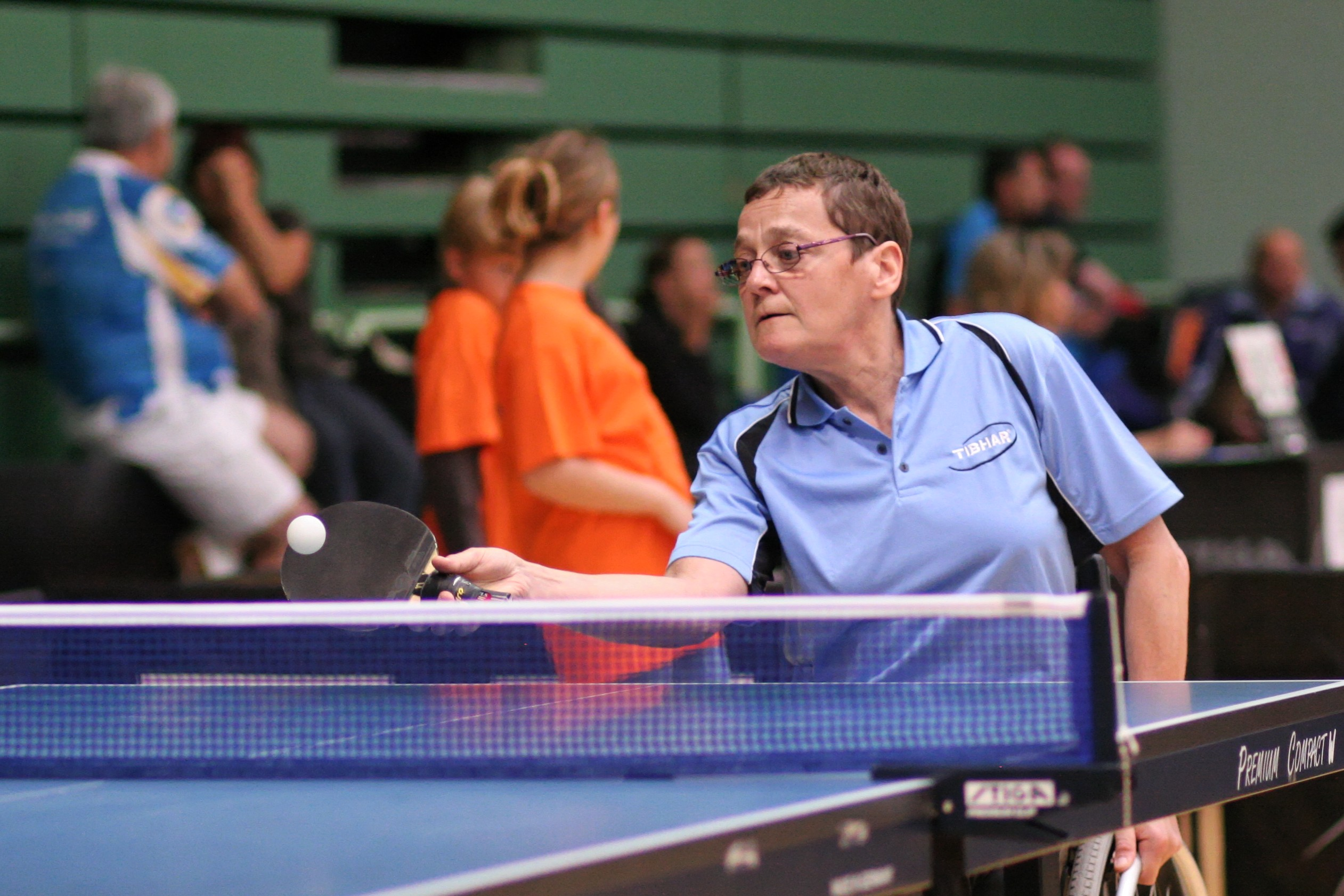
- Marie-Line Pollet at the Slovenia Open 2009

Sport
- Country: Belgium
- Sport: Paralympic athletics Paralympic table tennis
- Disability: Paraplegia
- Event(s): Pentathlon; Javelin throw Shot put Discus throw 100 metres 200 metres Table tennis
Medal record
Representing Belgium
Paralympic Games
Paralympic athletics
| Gold medal – first place | 1984 Stoke Mandeville /New York | Pentathlon 2 |
| Gold medal – first place | 1984 Stoke Mandeville /New York | Shot put 2 |
| Gold medal – first place | 1988 Seoul | Pentathlon 4 |
| Silver medal – second place | 1984 Stoke Mandeville /New York | Discus 2 |
| Silver medal – second place | 1988 Seoul | Discus 4 |
| Silver medal – second place | 1988 Seoul | 200 m 4 |
| Bronze medal – third place | 1988 Seoul | Shot put 4 |
| Bronze medal – third place | 1988 Seoul | 100 m 4 |
Paralympic table tennis
| Bronze medal – third place | 1996 Atlanta | Singles 3 |

Marie-Line Pollet is a Belgian former para-athlete, wheelchair racer and para table tennis player. She has had paraplegia since she contracted polio at 11 months old. A multiple-time Belgian, European, and world champion in parasports, she is also a multiple Paralympic medalist and former world record holder in several events.

She is Belgium's most successful athlete at the Summer Paralympics, having won nine medals between 1984 and 1996. Pollet began her Paralympic career at the 1980 Summer Paralympics, where she did not win a medal. At the 1984 Summer Paralympics, she won gold medals in the shot put (category 2) and pentathlon (category 2), and a silver medal in the discus throw (category 2). At the 1988 Summer Paralympics, she earned five medals: gold in the pentathlon (category 4), silver in the 200 m wheelchair race (category 4) and discus throw (category 4), and bronze in the 100 m wheelchair race (category 4) and shot put (category 4).

Later in her career, Pollet transitioned to table tennis and won a bronze medal in the singles (category 3) at the 1996 Summer Paralympics.
