= Nachman Wolf =

Israeli Paralympic athlete (1951–2022)

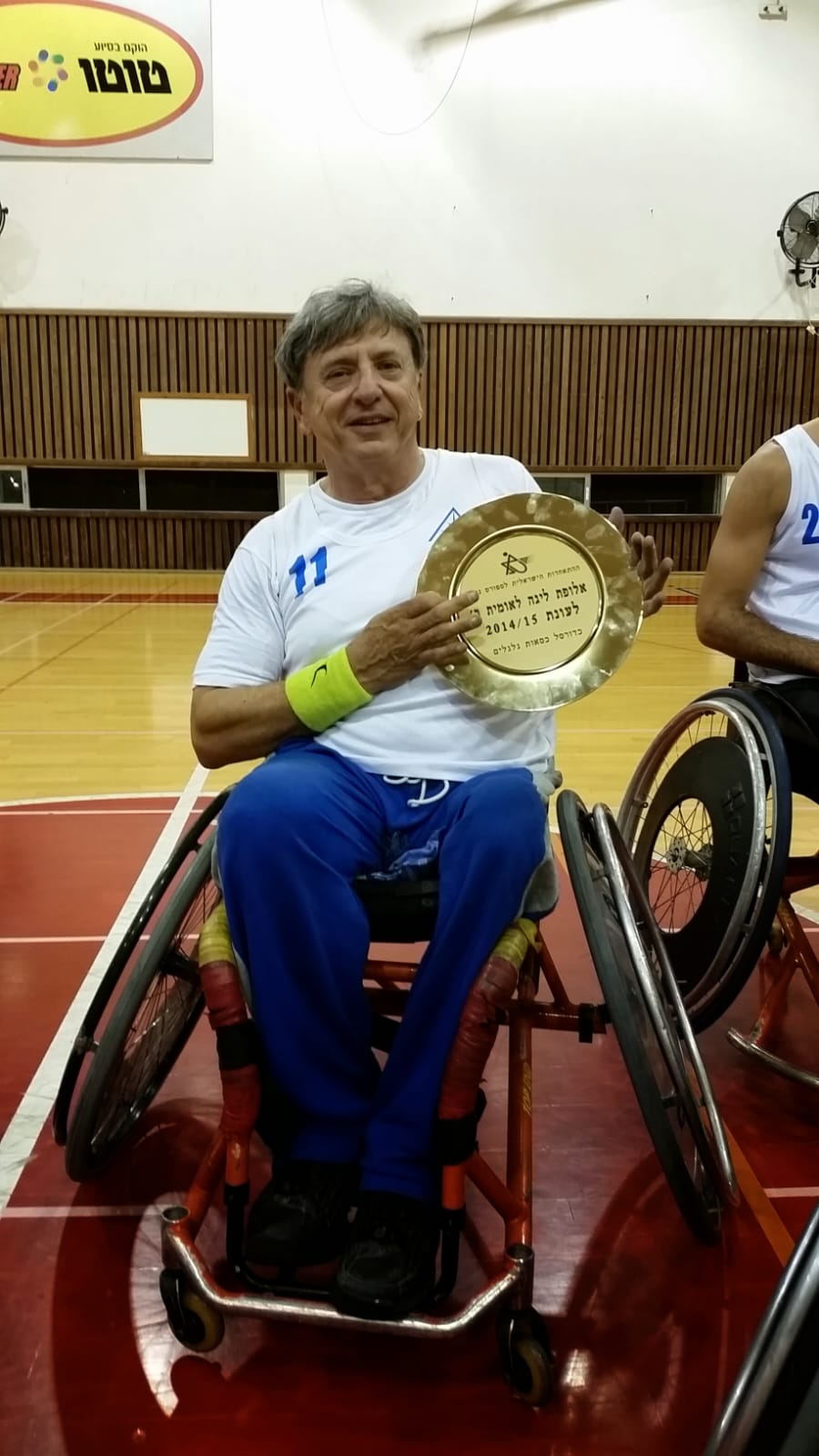

Personal information
- Native name: נחמן וולף
Medal record
Event / 1st / 2nd / 3rd; Paralympic Games / 3 / 6 / 0
Representing Israel
Paralympic Games
Paralympic athletics
Gold medal – first place	1984 Stoke Mandeville-New York	Discus Throw 6
Gold medal – first place	1984 Stoke Mandeville-New York	Shot Put 6
Gold medal – first place	1988 Seoul	Discus Throw 6
Silver medal – second place	1984 Stoke Mandeville-New York	Javelin Throw 6
Silver medal – second place	1984 Stoke Mandeville-New York	Pentathlon 6
Silver medal – second place	1988 Seoul	Javelin Throw 6
Silver medal – second place	1988 Seoul	Shot Put 6
Silver medal – second place	1988 Seoul	Pentathlon 6
Silver medal – second place	1996 Atlanta	Discus Throw F41

Nachman Wolf (Hebrew: נחמן וולף; 1951 – 15 February 2022) was an Israeli Paralympic athlete who competed mainly in category F41 throw events.

== Biography ==
Wolf competed at a total of nine Paralympics for Israel, his first games in Stoke Mandeville/New York in 1984 were his most successful as he picked up gold in the discus and shot put and silver in the javelin and pentathlon missing out on gold to Sweden's Raymond Clark in both events.

Four years later in Seoul at the 1988 Summer Paralympics Nachman won three silver medals in pentathlon, javelin throw and shot put and defended his title in the discus. After finishing way down the field in each of the throws in 1992, Nachman returned in 1996 finishing fourth in both the shot and javelin, he won a silver in the discus. He returned for a last time in the 2000 Summer Paralympics where he competed in a wheelchair in all three throws but failed to add to an impressive medal tally.

Wolf died on 15 February 2022, at the age of 70.
