= Josef Loisinger =

Austrian Paralympic athlete

Sport
- Country: Austria
- Sport: Para-athletics
Medal record
Paralympic Games
Silver medal – second place	1988 Seoul	Pentathlon 3

Josef Loisinger is a former Austrian Paralympic athlete. He represented Austria at the 1988 Summer Paralympics held in Seoul, South Korea and he won the silver medal in the men's pentathlon 3 event. He also competed at the 1992 Summer Paralympics and the 1996 Summer Paralympics.
