= Michael Walker (Paralympian) =

British Paralympic athlete

Sport
- Country: United Kingdom
- Sport: Paralympic athletics
Medal record
Paralympic Games
| Gold medal – first place | 1988 Seoul | Men's Shot Put C4 |
| Gold medal – first place | 1988 Seoul | Men's Discus Throw C4 |
| Gold medal – first place | 1988 Seoul | Men's Club Throw C4 |
| Gold medal – first place | 1988 Seoul | Men's Javelin C4 |
| Gold medal – first place | 1992 Barcelona | Men's Shot Put C3-4 |

Michael Walker is a Paralympic athlete who won five gold medals representing Great Britain. Walker won gold in four category C4 track and field events at the 1988 Summer Paralympics in Seoul, South Korea: the shot put, the discus, the club throw and the javelin. He retained the shot put title in Barcelona 1992.
