= Robert Barrett (athlete) =

British Paralympic athlete (born 1957)

Personal information
- Nationality: Great Britain
- Born: 29 July 1957 (age 69) Belfast (NI)
Medal record
Representing Great Britain
Paralympic Games
Athletics
Bronze medal – third place	1988 Seoul	Men's 100 m A4A9
Bronze medal – third place	1988 Seoul	Men's 200 m A4A9

Robert Barrett (born 28 July 1957) is a former Paralympic athlete from Great Britain competing mainly in running events.

Barrett, a below knee amputee, represented Great Britain in the 1988 Games in Seoul in athletics taking two bronze medals in the 100m and 200m Sprint (A4A9 class).
