= Mustapha Badid =

French Paralympic athlete

Medal record

Men's para athletics

Representing France

Paralympic Games
Gold medal – first place	1984 Stoke Mandeville /New York	800 m - A1-3
Gold medal – first place	1988 Seoul	200 m - A1-3A9L2
Gold medal – first place	1988 Seoul	1500 m - A1-3A9L2
Gold medal – first place	1988 Seoul	5000 m - A1-3A9L2
Gold medal – first place	1988 Seoul	Marathon - A1-3A9L1-2
Gold medal – first place	1996 Atlanta	4x400 m relay - T52-53
Silver medal – second place	1988 Seoul	100 m - A1-3A9L2
Bronze medal – third place	1996 Atlanta	800 m - T53

Mustapha Badid (born 1964) is a paralympic track and field athlete from France competing mainly in category T53 wheelchair racing events.

Mustapha competed in four Paralympics, winning eight medals six of which were gold. His first experience in the Paralympics was in 1984 when he competed in the 100m, 400m and shot put and won a gold medal in the A1-3 800m. The 1988 Summer Paralympics would prove to be his best games winning gold in the 200m, 1500m, 5000m and Marathon and winning the silver in the 100m just 0.12 seconds behind Canada's Daniel Westley. After a performance like that it was going to be difficult to match it in the 1992 but the 1992 were a complete disaster as Mustapha missed out on the medals in all his events 100m, 200m,800m and marathon. He did get back to medal winning ways in his final games in 1996 winning a gold in the 4 × 400 m and a bronze in the 800m as well as competing in the 100m, 400m and marathon.
