= Puerto Rico at the 1996 Summer Paralympics =

- IPC code: PUR
- NPC: Comite Paralimpico de Puerto Rico

in Atlanta
- Competitors: 5 (3 men and 2 women)
- Medals: Gold 0 Silver 0 Bronze 0 Total 0

Summer Paralympics appearances (overview)
- 1988; 1992; 1996; 2000; 2004; 2008; 2012; 2016; 2020; 2024

Five athletes (three men and two women) from Puerto Rico competed at the 1996 Summer Paralympics in Atlanta, United States.

== See also ==
- Puerto Rico at the Paralympics
- Puerto Rico at the 1996 Summer Olympics
