= Kai Pirttijärvi =

Finnish Paralympic athlete

Sport
- Country: Finland
- Sport: Para-athletics
Medal record
Paralympic Games
Silver medal – second place	1988 Seoul	1500 m A6A8A9L4

Kai Pirttijärvi is a Finnish former Paralympic athlete. He represented Finland at the 1988 Summer Paralympics held in Seoul, South Korea and he won the silver medal in the men's 1500 m A6A8A9L4 event.
