= William Wiebe =

Canadian Paralympic athlete

Personal information
- Born: 30 October 1963 (age 62) Fort Vermilion, Alberta, Canada

Sport
- Sport: Athletics
Medal record
Representing Canada
Paralympic Games
Athletics
Silver medal – second place	1988 Seoul	Men's 100 m A6/A8-9/L4

William Wiebe (born 30 October 1963 in Fort Vermilion) is a Canadian Paralympic athlete. He competed in the 1984 and 1988 Summer Paralympics. In the 1988 Paralympics, he won a silver medal in the men's 100 metres.
