= Karin Gambal =

Austrian Paralympic athlete

Sport
- Country: Austria
- Sport: Para-athletics
Medal record
Paralympic Games
Bronze medal – third place	1988 Seoul	100 m A4A9
Bronze medal – third place	1988 Seoul	200 m A4A9

Karin Gambal is a former Austrian Paralympic athlete. She represented Austria at the 1988 Summer Paralympics in Seoul, South Korea, winning two bronze medals in the women's 100 m A4/A9 and women's 200 m A4/A9 events.
