= Randy Dorman =

American Paralympic athlete

Sport
- Country: United States
- Sport: Para-athletics
Medal record
Paralympic Games
Gold medal – first place	1988 Seoul	100 m 1C

Randy Dorman is a former American Paralympic athlete. He represented the United States at the 1988 Summer Paralympics held in Seoul, South Korea and he won the gold medal in the men's 100 meters 1C event. He also set a new world record of 20.14 seconds.
