= Bruce Froendt =

American paralympic athlete

Personal information
- Born: Coleridge, Nebraska, U.S.
- Education: University of Nebraska

Sport
- Country: United States
- Sport: Para-athletics
- Disability: Quadriplegic
Medal record
Representing United States
Paralympic Games
Para-athletics
Bronze medal – third place	1988 Seoul	Men's 200 m 1B

Bruce Froendt is an American paralympic athlete. He competed at the 1988 Summer Paralympics.

== Life and career ==
Froendt was born and raised in Coleridge, Nebraska. He attended the University of Nebraska, where he earned his bachelor's degree in business administration.

At the age of 23, Froendt became a quadriplegic after breaking his neck when he was diving into a hotel swimming pool.

Froendt competed at the 1988 Summer Paralympics, winning a bronze medal in the men's 200 m 1B event in athletics.
