= Jamie Bone =

Canadian Paralympic athlete

Personal information
- Nationality: Canadian
- Born: July 11, 1966 (age 60) Sault Ste. Marie, Ontario

Sport
- Sport: Athletics
Medal record
Representing Canada
Paralympic Games
Athletics
Gold medal – first place	1988 Seoul	Men's 100 m C3
Gold medal – first place	1988 Seoul	Men's 200 m C3
Gold medal – first place	1988 Seoul	Men's 400 m C3
Bronze medal – third place	1988 Seoul	Men's 4x100m C2-3

Jamie Bone (born July 11, 1966, in Sault Ste. Marie, Ontario) is a Canadian Paralympic athlete. He competed in the 1988 Summer Paralympics. In the 1988 Paralympics, he won three gold medals and a bronze, taking a clean sweep of the 100, 200 and 400 metres.

In 2018 Bone was named one of the greatest 15 athletes in Nova Scotia's history.
