= Hannu Argillander =

Finnish Paralympic athlete

Sport
- Country: Finland
- Sport: Para-athletics
Medal record
Paralympic Games
Silver medal – second place	1988 Seoul	Pentathlon B3

Hannu Argillander is a Finnish former Paralympic athlete. He represented Finland at the 1988 Summer Paralympics held in Seoul, South Korea and he won the silver medal in the men's pentathlon B3 event. He also competed in the men's javelin B3 event.
