= Milena Balsamo =

Italian Paralympic athlete (born 1961)

Personal information
- Born: 26 January 1961 (age 65) Bologna, Italy

Sport
- Country: Italy
- Sport: Paralympic athletics
- Retired: 1992
Medal record
Paralympic athletics
Representing Italy
Paralympic Games
Gold medal – first place	1988 Seoul	4x100m 2-6 relay
Silver medal – second place	1984 Stoke Mandeville/New York	100m 4
Bronze medal – third place	1984 Stoke Mandeville/New York	4x400m 2-5 relay
Bronze medal – third place	1988 Seoul	4x200m 2-6 relay
Bronze medal – third place	1988 Seoul	4x400m 2-6 relay

Milena Balsamo (born 26 January 1961 in Bologna) is an Italian Paralympic athlete.

She competed in a wheelchair as a sprinter in category 4, and participated in the 1984 Stoke Mandeville Paralympics, and 1988 Summer Paralympics, in Seoul, winning a total of five medals, including four in the relay.

In 2015, she was awarded the Collare d'oro for sporting merit by the Italian National Olympic Committee.

== Life ==
She was born in Bologna. She was trained in the San Michele Society.

She won a bronze medal at the 1984 Summer Paralympics, in the 4x400 meters, and silver medal at the 100 meters. She won a gold medal at the 1988 Summer Paralympic Games in the 4x100 meters, and bronze medal at the 4x200 meters, and 4x400 meters.

In 1992, she retired from international competition.
