= Colin Keay =

Scottish and British athlete

Sport
- Country: United Kingdom
- Sport: Paralympic athletics
Medal record
Paralympic Games
Gold medal – first place	1984 Stoke Mandeville	Men's 60 m C6
Gold medal – first place	1984 Stoke Mandeville	Men's 400 m C6
Gold medal – first place	1984 Stoke Mandeville	Men's Cross Country 1000 m C6
Gold medal – first place	1988 Seoul	Men's 200 m C6
Gold medal – first place	1988 Seoul	Men's 400 m C6
Silver medal – second place	1988 Seoul	Men's 100 m C6

Colin Keay is a retired Scottish and British athlete who won medals at European, Paralympic, and world level. He won five gold medals and one silver medal in C6 athletics across the 1984 Summer Paralympics and 1988 Games.

Born with cerebral palsy and secondary sensory challenges, Keay is described as "the leading T36 athlete on the track during the 80s" by Scottish Disability Sport. He won Paralympic gold in 1984 at three different distances: 60 m, 400 m, and cross country 1000 m, then two more in 1988: the 200 m and 400 m.
