= Josef Fuchs (athlete) =

Austrian Paralympic athlete

Personal information
- Born: 13 March 1935 (age 91)

Sport
- Country: Austria
- Sport: Para-athletics
- Events: Club throw; Discus throw
Medal record
Paralympic Games
Bronze medal – third place	1988 Seoul	Club throw C4

Josef Fuchs (born 13 March 1935) is a former Austrian Paralympic athlete. He represented Austria at the 1988 Summer Paralympics held in Seoul, South Korea and he won the bronze medal in the men's club throw C4 event. He also competed in the men's discus throw C4 event.
