= Kevin Orr =

Personal information
- Nationality: United States
- Born: June 29, 1968 (age 58) Algonquin, Illinois, US
Medal record
Men's Track and field
Representing United States
Paralympic Games
Bronze medal – third place	1988 Seoul	800m A1-3/A9/L2
Bronze medal – third place	1988 Seoul	5000m A1-3/A9/L2

Kevin Orr (born June 29, 1968) is an American Paralympic athlete and coach. Orr won two bronze medals at the 1988 Summer Paralympics in the 800 and 5,000 meter races. Upon retiring from playing, Orr became a coach for Team USA (2001–2004), USA Wheelchair Track (2005–2008) Canada (2009–2016), and Japan (2017–2023).

== Early life ==
Orr was born on June 29, 1968, in Algonquin, Illinois to parents Mike and Sue. He was born with a birth defect (arthrogryposis) which caused limited use of his legs. By the age of two, with the assistance of physio therapists at McHenry County Easter Seal Therapy Center, Orr was able to walk with the assistance of crutches.

While attending Jacobs High School, Orr joined the wrestling team with his twin brother and played non-competitive soccer and basketball. Due to his birth defect, Orr was unable to compete in Algonquin's soccer program but, instead, acted as a referee. Orr competed in the 105 weight class as a sophomore but never won a meet. Due to his disability, he was forced to crawl to the mat and start in a kneeling position which resulted in an immediate point for his opponent. During his sophomore year, Orr was inspired to pursue wheelchair sports after watching Sharon Hedrick win a gold medal in the 800-meter wheelchair race at the 1984 Summer Olympics. The following year, Orr competed against older athletes in the Men's Division of the Michigan Avenue Mile Wheelchair Race and finished third with a time of 5 minutes, 29.89 seconds.

== Career ==
Upon graduating from high school, Orr enrolled at the University of Illinois due to their program for disabled athletes. By the age of 19, he had won the Chicago Area Running Association Disabled Circuit, the 10-kilometer wheelchair race in the Prairie State Games, and two bronze medals in the elite division at the Men's National Track and Field Meet of the National Wheelchair Games. As a result, Orr also qualified for the United States Nation Team to compete at the 1988 Summer Paralympics in Seoul, South Korea. He later credited the University of Illinois wheelchair basketball coach and head of recreation and athletics, Brad Hedrick, for helping him with his success.

At the 1988 Summer Paralympics, Orr won two bronze medals in the 800 and 5,000 meter races. During his four years at the university, he was a member of four consecutive National Championship Wheelchair Basketball teams and was named the MVP in his senior year. After graduating in 1990 with a degree in therapeutic recreation, Orr moved to Birmingham, Alabama, where he started a wheelchair rugby program at Lakeshore Foundation. In 1996, Orr founded the Lakeshore Demolition Derby tournament and created the 40 second shot clock. The clock was eventually adopted by the International Wheelchair Rugby Federation.

From 1999 until 2004, Orr served as the head coach of Team USA's Wheelchair Rugby team and was featured in the documentary Murderball. However, after the team lost to Canada in the 2004 Summer Paralympics, he was released from the team. Following this, he accepted a position as one of the USA wheelchair racing track coaches during the 2008 Summer Paralympics and was picked as the head coach of Team Canada’s wheelchair rugby team. Following the Rio Paralympics, Coach Orr moved on to coach the Japan Wheelchair Rugby team (2017-2023) for the 2020 Paralympics in Tokyo. Kevin's team won the World Championship in 2018 in Sydney and the bronze medal in 2021 Paralympics in Tokyo. In 2019, Orr was inducted into the U.S. Quadriplegic Rugby Hall of Fame.

== Personal life ==
Orr and his wife Stephanie have two daughters together.
