= Antti Dahlberg =

Finnish Paralympic athlete

Sport
- Country: Finland
- Sport: Para-athletics
Medal record
Paralympic Games
Bronze medal – third place	1988 Seoul	10,000 m 4

Antti Dahlberg is a Finnish former Paralympic athlete. He represented Finland at the 1988 Summer Paralympics held in Seoul, South Korea and he won the bronze medal in the men's 10,000 m 4 event. He also competed at the Summer Paralympics in 1980, 1984 and 1992.
