= James Enright (athlete) =

Canadian Paralympic athlete

Personal information
- Born: 28 April 1964 (age 62) Gatineau, Quebec, Canada

Sport
- Sport: Athletics; Wheelchair basketball
Medal record
Representing Canada
Paralympic Games
Athletics
Bronze medal – third place	1988 Seoul	Men's HighJump A4A9
Silver medal – second place	1988 Seoul	Men's Javelin A4A9

James Enright (born 28 April 1964) is a Canadian Paralympic athlete who competed in athletics and wheelchair basketball. In the 1988 Summer Paralympics he competed in athletics and received a silver medal for his loss in the men's javelin followed by a winning bronze medal performance in men's high jump. Quit 10 year athletics career after culmination of vision to experience growth of team dynamics in wheelchair basketball. Selected to National Team in 1990 and competed for fifth-place finishes at both the 1992 Summer Paralympics (co-captain) and 1996 Summer Paralympics (captain) in the wheelchair basketball competitions. Attended 2000 Summer Paralympics as Team Manager with an undefeated record to win the gold medal. He was elected in 1995 as the Men's National Team Rep and held position until retiring in 2000,
