= Puerto Rico at the 1992 Summer Paralympics =

Competition

- IPC code: PUR
- NPC: Comite Paralimpico de Puerto Rico

in Barcelona
- Competitors: 9
- Medals Ranked 55th: Gold 0 Silver 0 Bronze 1 Total 1

Summer Paralympics appearances (overview)
- 1988; 1992; 1996; 2000; 2004; 2008; 2012; 2016; 2020; 2024

Puerto Rico competed at the 1992 Summer Paralympics in Barcelona, Spain. Nine competitors from Puerto Rico won no medals and so did not place in the medal table.

== See also ==
- Puerto Rico at the Paralympics
- Puerto Rico at the 1992 Summer Olympics
