= Puerto Rico at the 2024 Summer Paralympics =

- IPC code: PUR

in Paris, France August 28, 2024 – September 8, 2024
- Competitors: 2 in 1 sport
- Flag bearer: Amaris Sofia Vazquez Collazo
- Medals: Gold 0 Silver 0 Bronze 0 Total 0

Summer Paralympics appearances (overview)
- 1988; 1992; 1996; 2000; 2004; 2008; 2012; 2016; 2020; 2024

Puerto Rico competed at the 2024 Summer Paralympics in Paris, France, from 28 August to 8 September 2024. This was the nation's tenth time competing at the Summer Paralympic Games after it made its debut at the 1988 Summer Paralympics. The delegation consisted of two competitors from one sport.

== Competitors ==
The following is the list of number of competitors in the Games.

Sport	Men	Women	Total
Athletics	0	2	2
Total	0	2	2

== Athletics ==
Athlete	Event	Heat		Final	
Athlete	Event	Result	Rank	Result	Rank
Yaimillie Marie Diaz Colon	Women's 100 metres T64	13.62	6	did not advance	
Yaimillie Marie Diaz Colon	Women's 100 metres T64				
Amaris Sofia Vazquez Collazo	Women's 100 metres T64	15.57	7	did not advance	
Amaris Sofia Vazquez Collazo	Women's 100 metres T64				
Amaris Sofia Vazquez Collazo	Women's long jump T64			4.10	12

== See also ==
- Puerto Rico at the 2024 Summer Olympics
- Puerto Rico at the Paralympics
