= Jan Kleinheerenbrink =

Dutch Paralympic athlete

Sport
- Country: Netherlands
- Sport: Para-athletics
- Events: 100 metres; 200 metres; 400 metres
Medal record
Paralympic Games
Gold medal – first place	1988 Seoul	200 metres 4
Silver medal – second place	1988 Seoul	100 metres 4
Bronze medal – third place	1988 Seoul	400 metres 4

Jan Kleinheerenbrink is a Dutch Paralympic athlete. He represented the Netherlands at the 1988 Summer Paralympics and at the 1992 Summer Paralympics. In total, he won one gold medal, one silver medal and one bronze medal.

In 1988, he won the gold medal in the 200 metres 4 event, the silver medal in the 100 metres 4 event and the bronze medal in the 400 metres 4 event.
