= Ted Vince =

Canadian wheelchair athlete

Ted Vince is a former Canadian wheelchair athlete. Vince won the 1988 London Marathon men's wheelchair race, narrowly defeating Mike Bishop and defending champion Chris Hallam to set a new course record of 2:01:37. He competed in the 1984 and 1988 Summer Paralympics, winning two bronze medals the latter year in the 400 metres and the marathon.
