= Grant Buchanan =

New Zealand Paralympic athlete

Personal information
- Nationality: New Zealander

Sport
- Sport: Athletics
Medal record
Men's para athletics
Representing New Zealand
Paralympic Games
Bronze medal – third place	1988 Seoul	Discus Throw 1C
Bronze medal – third place	1988 Seoul	Shot Put 1C

Grant Buchanan is a former New Zealand Paralympic athlete. In the 1988 Summer Paralympics he won two gold medals in the discus throw and shot put.
