= Laura Schwanger =

American Paralympic athlete (born 1958)

Personal information
- Born: November 1958 (age 67) Philadelphia, United States
- Education: Rowan College; Immaculata College

Sport
- Country: United States
- Sport: Paralympic athletics Adaptive rowing
- Disability: Multiple sclerosis
- Disability class: F53
- Event(s): Pentathlon; Javelin throw Discus throw Shot put
Medal record
Paralympic athletics
Representing United States
Paralympic Games
Gold medal – first place	1988 Seoul	Women's discus throw 3
Gold medal – first place	1988 Seoul	Women's javelin throw 3
Gold medal – first place	1988 Seoul	Women's pentathlon 3
Gold medal – first place	1988 Seoul	Women's shot put 3
Silver medal – second place	1992 Barcelona	Women's javelin throw THW5
Silver medal – second place	1992 Barcelona	Women's pentathlon PW3-4
Silver medal – second place	1992 Barcelona	Women's shot put THW5
Silver medal – second place	1996 Atlanta	Women's discus throw F53-54
Silver medal – second place	1996 Atlanta	Women's javelin throw F53-54
Silver medal – second place	1996 Atlanta	Women's shot put F53-54
Bronze medal – third place	1992 Barcelona	Women's discus throw THW5
Adaptive rowing
Paralympic Games
Bronze medal – third place	2008 Beijing	Women's single sculls

Laura Gene Schwanger (born 1958) is a retired American Paralympic athlete and adaptive rower. She has competed at three Paralympic Games in track and field and returned twelve years later to compete in rowing at the 2008 Summer Paralympics. She is a four time Paralympic champion including six silver medals and one bronze medal in athletics and won a bronze medal in rowing.

After graduating from Washington Township High School, New Jersey in 1977, Schwanger joined the United States Army and became a meteorological observer. She was diagnosed with multiple sclerosis in 1981 while on active duty.

She took up athletics soon after then retired after the 1996 Summer Paralympics, she took up rowing in later 2006 after receiving chemotherapy for breast cancer.

She studied physical education at Glassboro State College, which became Rowan College during her time there. She earned a master's degree in counseling and psychology at Immaculata College.
