= Farid Amarouche =

French wheelchair racer

Farid Amarouche is a French wheelchair athlete. He won the 1991 London Marathon men's wheelchair race in a close finish, setting a new course record of 1:52:52 and beating previous and future winners Hakan Ericsson, Daniel Wesley, and David Holding in the process. He also took part in the 1988 and 1992 Summer Paralympics, winning three gold and three silver medals in the earlier year.
