= Gary Schaff =

Canadian Paralympic athlete (1959–2020)

Personal information
- Nationality: Canadian
- Born: 13 November 1959 Vancouver, British Columbia, Canada
- Died: 7 August 2020 (aged 60) Edmonton, Alberta, Canada

Sport
- Sport: Athletics
Medal record
Representing Canada
Paralympic Games
Athletics
Bronze medal – third place	1988 Seoul	Men's Discus Throw 2

Gary Schaff (13 November 1959 – 7 August 2020) was a Canadian Paralympic athlete. In the 1988 Summer Paralympics he won a silver medal in the men's discus throw. He also placed fifth in the shot put event in the same Paralympics.
