= Ann Cody =

American Paralympic athlete

Personal information
- Born: May 14, 1963 (age 63) Binghamton, New York
Medal record
Athletics
Representing United States
Paralympic Games
Gold medal – first place	1992 Barcelona	4 x 100 m relay TW3–4
Silver medal – second place	1992 Barcelona	10000 m TW3–4
Silver medal – second place	1988 Seoul	800 m 2
Silver medal – second place	1988 Seoul	1500 m 2
Silver medal – second place	1988 Seoul	5000 m 2
Bronze medal – third place	1988 Seoul	10000 m 2

Ann Cody (born May 14, 1963) is a three-time U.S. Paralympian who works at the United States Department of State in the Bureau of Democracy, Human Rights, and Labor on the advancement of international disability rights. After debuting at the 1984 Summer Paralympics in wheelchair basketball, Cody won four silver medals in athletics at the 1988 Summer Paralympics. Cody also competed at the 1988 Summer Olympics in wheelchair racing. At her third Paralympics, Cody helped set a world record in the 4 × 100 m relay at the 1992 Summer Paralympics while winning one gold and one bronze medal.

Apart from competing at the Paralympic Games, Cody won the women's wheelchair division at the Chicago Marathon in 1989, 1990; Los Angeles Marathon in 1990; Mobile 10K National Championship 1990, 1991; and two second-place finishes at the Boston Marathon in 1990, 1991. She was the first woman Paralympian elected to the International Paralympic Committee governing board in 2005 and won re-election in 2009 and 2013, and was awarded the Paralympic Order in 2017.

== Early life and education ==
Cody was born on May 14, 1963, in Binghamton, New York. While attending Groton High School, she competed in varsity field hockey, volleyball, basketball, and softball. She became disabled her junior year in high school. At the University of Illinois Cody obtained bachelor of fine arts and Master of Science degrees while competing as a dual sport athlete in wheelchair basketball and wheelchair racing. At Illinois, Cody helped win five national championships in wheelchair basketball in 1983, 1986, 1989, 1991, and 1991.

== Career ==
Cody started her Paralympic career representing the United States in wheelchair basketball at the 1984 Summer Paralympics. Cody competed in athletics in her second Paralympic Games and won four silver medals at the 1988 Summer Paralympics in Seoul, South Korea. At her final Paralympic Games, Cody won a gold and a bronze at the 1992 Summer Paralympics in Barcelona, Spain while helping set a world record in the 4 × 100 m relay. In 2013, she ran for vice president of the International Paralympic Committee. While she was defeated by Andrew Parsons, Cody was elected to IPC's governing board that year for a third and final term. She was responsible for writing and securing passage of IPC's gender equity policy at the 2003 general assembly. As Chair of the IPC women in sport committee she developed an IPC report card on gender equity to reflect the rate of women in leadership positions across IPC, sports federations, and NPCs and set targets for increasing the number of women athletes competing in summer and winter Games. Women made up 40% of the athletes competing at the 2021 Tokyo Paralympic Games compared to just 25% in the 2000 Paralympics in Sydney, Australia.

Outside of the Paralympics, Cody appeared at the 1988 Summer Olympics in wheelchair racing. She won the 1989 Chicago Marathon and 1990 Los Angeles Marathon in the women's wheelchair division. Cody also won the wheelchair division of the 1990 Chicago Marathon. Alternatively, Cody has held positions in the non-profit, business, and public sectors. She was a venue director for the 1996 Atlanta Paralympic Organizing Committee. Cody was vice president with Sagamore Associates now Faegre Drinker the government affairs consulting firm from 1999 to 2007. At BlazeSports America she designed and led a campaign to increase interscholastic sports offerings for students with disabilities. Currently, Cody works at the United States Department of State in the Bureau of Democracy, Human Rights, and Labor.

== Awards and honors ==
Cody earned all-tournament honors from the National Wheelchair Basketball Association's women's division in 1985, 1986, 1987, 1989, 1990, and 1991. She was named athlete of the year by both USA Track & Field and Wheelchair Sports, USA in 1990. In 2004, Cody was inducted into the Adaptive Sports USA Hall of Fame. During 2007, she was named a Distinguished Alumni from the University of Illinois. In 2009, Cody was awarded the Amazing Leader award by the U.S. Paralympics.

In 2012, she received the George M. Steinbrenner III Sport Leadership Award from the U.S. Olympic Foundation. In 2017, Cody was awarded the Paralympic Order. She received a Doctorate of Humane Letters from the State University of New York at Cortland in 2019.
