= Ian Hayden =

Australian rules footballer (1941–2024)

Personal information
- Full name: Ian Michael Hayden
- Born: 14 April 1941
- Died: 2 May 2024 (aged 83); Brighton, Victoria, Australia
- Original team: University Blues (VAFA)
- Height: 185 cm (6 ft 1 in)
- Weight: 89 kg (196 lb)

Playing career^{1}
Years	Club	Games (Goals)
1962–1964	Richmond	30 (42)
- ^{1} Playing statistics correct to the end of 1964.

Ian Hayden (14 April 1941 – 2 May 2024) was an Australian rules footballer who played with Richmond in the Victorian Football League (VFL).

== History ==
Before coming to Richmond, Hayden was one of the leading players in the Victorian Amateur Football Association (VAFA), winning the Woodrow Medal in 1960 while playing for the University Blues.

A follower and key position player, Hayden made his senior VFL debut in 1962, kicking 17 goals from 13 appearances. He won the Club's Best First Year Player award. He bettered that tally in 1963, with 25 goals from 15 games, enough to top Richmond's goal-kicking. This included a personal best six goal haul, against South Melbourne at Lake Oval, one of just seven wins that he participated in over the course of his career.

In round 1 of 1964, Hayden received 3 Brownlow votes for a best-on-ground performance against Footscray. He took 18 marks at centre half back. He badly injured himself in the second round of the 1964 VFL season, against Essendon, when he tore ligaments in his knee. After having a cartilage operation, Hayden returned to training in 1965 but broke down during a practice match in April. He was advised to stay off the football field for the rest of the year in order to resume his career in 1966, fully recovered. It, however, did not work out and he was forced to retire.

Hayden's subsequent career was as a criminal barrister. He worked on some of the biggest trials in Victorian history in a 55-year career. He died on 2 May 2024 at the age of 83.
