= Stuart Minifie =

New Zealand para-athlete

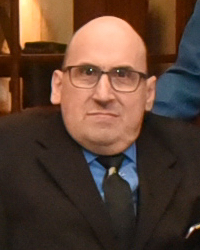
- Minifie in 2020

Personal information
- Nationality: New Zealander

Sport
- Sport: Athletics
Medal record
Men's para athletics
Representing New Zealand
Paralympic Games
Silver medal – second place	1988 Seoul	200 m 1C

Stuart Minifie is a former New Zealand Paralympic athlete. In the 1988 Summer Paralympics he won a silver medal in the men's 200 metres.
