= Chris Hallam =

Welsh Paralympian and wheelchair athlete

Chris Hallam MBE
Personal information
- Born: Christopher Alexander Hallam; 31 December 1962 Derbyshire, England, UK
- Died: 16 August 2013 (aged 50)

Sport
- Country: Great Britain; Wales
- Sport: Wheelchair racing
Medal record
Representing Great Britain
Paralympic Games
Swimming
Gold medal – first place	1984 United Kingdom	50m breaststroke 2
Silver medal – second place	1988 Seoul	50m breaststroke 2
Athletics
Bronze medal – third place	1988 Seoul	400m 2
Bronze medal – third place	1992 Barcelona	100m TW3

Christopher Alexander Hallam, MBE (31 December 1962 – 16 August 2013) was a Welsh Paralympian and wheelchair athlete. He competed at four Paralympic Games; Stoke Mandeville, England (1984), Seoul, South Korea (1988), Barcelona, Spain (1992) and Atlanta, United States (1996), as well as two Commonwealth Games; Auckland, New Zealand (1990) and Victoria, British Columbia (1994).

== Personal history ==
Born in Derbyshire, Hallam was raised in Cwmbran, South Wales. He attended Llantarnam School, where he became a competitive swimmer, with aspirations of competing for Wales. A motorcycle accident at age 17 (en route to a training session) resulted in him becoming a wheelchair user. After rehabilitation he spent some time living and travelling in South Africa, before returning to the UK and becoming involved in wheelchair sport. He later studied for his undergraduate and MBA degrees at the University of Wales Institute, Cardiff.

In 2002 he became a Winston Churchill Fellow writing his report on the access of disabled people to specialist training equipment and gyms.

In his latter years, he had ill health. He received a successful kidney transplant in 1996 (with a living donation from his father), but was diagnosed with lymphoma in 2011 and received chemotherapy treatment. He died on 16 August 2013, aged 50, and was survived by his parents (John and Anne) and a sister (Julie). Hallam was the subject of episode 1 of the 2019 BBC series Mavericks: Sport's Lost Heroes.

== Sporting career ==
In 1984 he won a gold medal for the 50m breast stroke, but it was on the track and road where he had the biggest impact. He won a bronze medal in the 400m in Seoul, and repeated this in the 100m in Barcelona. During his career he held world records in the 100m and 200m. He twice pushed his way around Wales (in 1987, 1997) with his training partner and fellow Paralympian John Harris, to raise money for a purpose-built wheelchair-accessible training centre at Cyncoed, Cardiff. He won the London marathon twice, and broke the course record both times, in 1985 and 1987. (1985: 2.19.53, and 1987: 2.08.34)

He won the Great North Run on four occasions (1986, 1987, 1989 and 1990). He competed at two Commonwealth Games, in New Zealand (1990), and in Victoria, British Columbia (1994), respectively, as well as World and European Championships. Chris took the bronze medal at the 100m wheelchair race during the 1992 paralympics in Barcelona As an administrator he organised several National events, and was Chairman of the British Wheelchair Racing Association from 1990 to 1992. In his coaching career he worked with several successful British athletes including Rose Hill, the British Record Holder for the marathon, and Dan Lucker who became world junior champion.
