= John Brewer (athlete) =

American paralympic athlete (1950–2022)

Personal information
- Born: June 6, 1950 San Francisco, California, U.S.
- Died: February 18, 2022 (aged 71)

Sport
- Country: United States
- Sport: Para-athletics
Medal record
Representing United States
Paralympic Games
Para-athletics
Silver medal – second place	1988 Seoul	Men's 800 m 1C
Silver medal – second place	1988 Seoul	Men's 1500 m 1C
Gold medal – first place	1988 Seoul	Men's marathon 1C

John Brewer (June 6, 1950 – February 18, 2022) was an American paralympic athlete. He participated at the 1988 and 2000 Summer Paralympics.

== Biography ==
Brewer was born in San Francisco, California, the son of Raymond Glen and Joan Brewer. He and his family moved to West Los Angeles where he attended and graduated from University High School. Brewer attended Santa Monica College, leaving to serve as a Mormon missionary from 1969 to 1971 before returning to complete his studies there.

Brewer had intended to attend Brigham Young University–Hawaii to obtain a degree. However, in December 1973 he was involved in a traffic collision which resulted in him being paralyzed from the chest down. He was hospitalized in California for almost a year, then moved to Utah to be with his family and receive further treatment at the University of Utah Hospital. Brewer attended the University of Utah, where he earned a Bachelor of Fine Arts degree. He worked as an art teacher in secondary schools for almost 40 years.

While at the University of Utah Brewer became involved in wheelchair sports. He became the first person to finish a marathon in a wheelchair in the Western United States in 1976.

Brewer competed in athletics at the 1988 Summer Paralympics. He was awarded silver medals in the men's 800m 1C and men's 1500m 1C events, before winning gold in the 1C men’s marathon He also competed in the marathon at the 2000 Summer Paralympics, but finished outside the medal positions.

Brewer died in February 2022 of a cardiac arrest at his home, at the age of 71.
