= Kuwait at the 1988 Summer Paralympics =

- IPC code: KUW
- NPC: Kuwait Paralympic Committee

in Seoul
- Competitors: 30
- Medals Ranked 25th: Gold 5 Silver 5 Bronze 7 Total 17

Summer Paralympics appearances (overview)
- 1980; 1984; 1988; 1992; 1996; 2000; 2004; 2008; 2012; 2016; 2020; 2024

Kuwait competed at the 1988 Summer Paralympics in Seoul, South Korea. 30 competitors from Kuwait won 17 medals including 5 gold, 5 silver and 7 bronze and finished 25th in the medal table.

== See also ==
- Kuwait at the Paralympics
- Kuwait at the 1988 Summer Olympics
