= Puerto Rico at the 2016 Summer Paralympics =

- IPC code: PUR
- NPC: Comite Paralimpico de Puerto Rico

in Rio de Janeiro
- Competitors: 4 in 3 sports
- Flag bearer: Luis Jabdiel Pérez
- Medals: Gold 0 Silver 0 Bronze 0 Total 0

Summer Paralympics appearances (overview)
- 1988; 1992; 1996; 2000; 2004; 2008; 2012; 2016; 2020; 2024

Puerto Rico competed at the 2016 Summer Paralympics in Rio de Janeiro, Brazil, from 7 to 18 September 2016.

== Archery ==
Individual

Athlete	Event	Ranking round		Round of 32	Round of 16	Quarterfinals	Semifinals	Final / BM	
Athlete	Event	Score	Seed	Opposition Score	Opposition Score	Opposition Score	Opposition Score	Opposition Score	Rank
Ricardo Alexis	Men's individual Compound open	623	29	Stutzman (USA); L 129–142	did not advance				

== Judo ==
Athlete	Event	Preliminaries	Quarterfinals	Semifinals	Repechage First round	Repechage Final	Final / BM	
Athlete	Event	Opposition Result	Opposition Result	Opposition Result	Opposition Result	Opposition Result	Opposition Result	Rank
Luis Diaz Perez	Men's −66 kg	Aajim (MGL); W 100–000	Nigmatov (UZB); L 000–010	Did not advance	Bye	Bareikis (LTU); L 000s2–001	did not advance	

== Swimming ==
Men

Athlete	Events	Heats		Final	
Athlete	Events	Time	Rank	Time	Rank
Darvin Báez Eliza	50 m freestyle S12	28.61	19	did not advance	
Darvin Báez Eliza	100 m breaststroke SB12	1:18.70	11	did not advance	

Women

Athlete	Events	Heats		Final	
Athlete	Events	Time	Rank	Time	Rank
Paola Acuña Sánchez	50 m freestyle S9	33.91	22	did not advance	
Paola Acuña Sánchez	100 m backstroke S9	1:26.61	17	did not advance	

== See also ==
- Puerto Rico at the 2016 Summer Olympics
