= Puerto Rico at the 2008 Summer Paralympics =

- IPC code: PUR
- NPC: Comite Paralimpico de Puerto Rico

in Beijing
- Medals Ranked 69th: Gold 0 Silver 0 Bronze 1 Total 1

Summer Paralympics appearances (overview)
- 1988; 1992; 1996; 2000; 2004; 2008; 2012; 2016; 2020; 2024

Puerto Rico competed at the 2008 Summer Paralympics in Beijing. The delegation consisted of three competitors, one track and field athlete, one sailor, and one sport shooter.

== Medalists ==
The country won one medal, a bronze.

Medal	Name	Sport	Event
Bronze	Nilda Gomez Lopez	Shooting	Women's 10 m air rifle standing SH1

== Track and field athletics ==
Athlete	Event	Heat		Semifinal		Final		
Athlete	Event	Result	Rank	Result	Rank	Result	Points	Rank
Alexis Pizarro-Jimenez	Men's shot put F57/58	N/A				12.99	868	12

== Sailing ==
One Puerto Rican athlete, Julio Reguero, competed in the single-person 2.4mR keelboat event. Reguero finished in ninth place out of sixteen sailors.

Athlete	Event	Race											Total points	Net points Total-(#)	Rank
Athlete	Event	1	2	3	4	5	6	7	8	9	10	11	Total points	Net points Total-(#)	Rank
Julio Reguero	2.4 mR - 1 person keelboat	7	(17); OCS	13	5	5	8	(15)	7	7	13	CAN	97	65	9

Key

- (#) = Worst two results discarded
- OCS = On the course side of the starting line (penalty)
- CAN = Race canceled

== Shooting ==
Athlete	Event	Qualification		Final	
Athlete	Event	Score	Rank	Score	Rank
Nilda Gomez Lopez	Women's air rifle standing SH1	387	5 Q	489.2	Bronze medal
Nilda Gomez Lopez	Women's sport rifle 3x20 SH1	536	17	Did not advance	

== See also ==
- Puerto Rico at the 2008 Summer Olympics
