= Kevin Saunders =

American paralympian (born 1955)

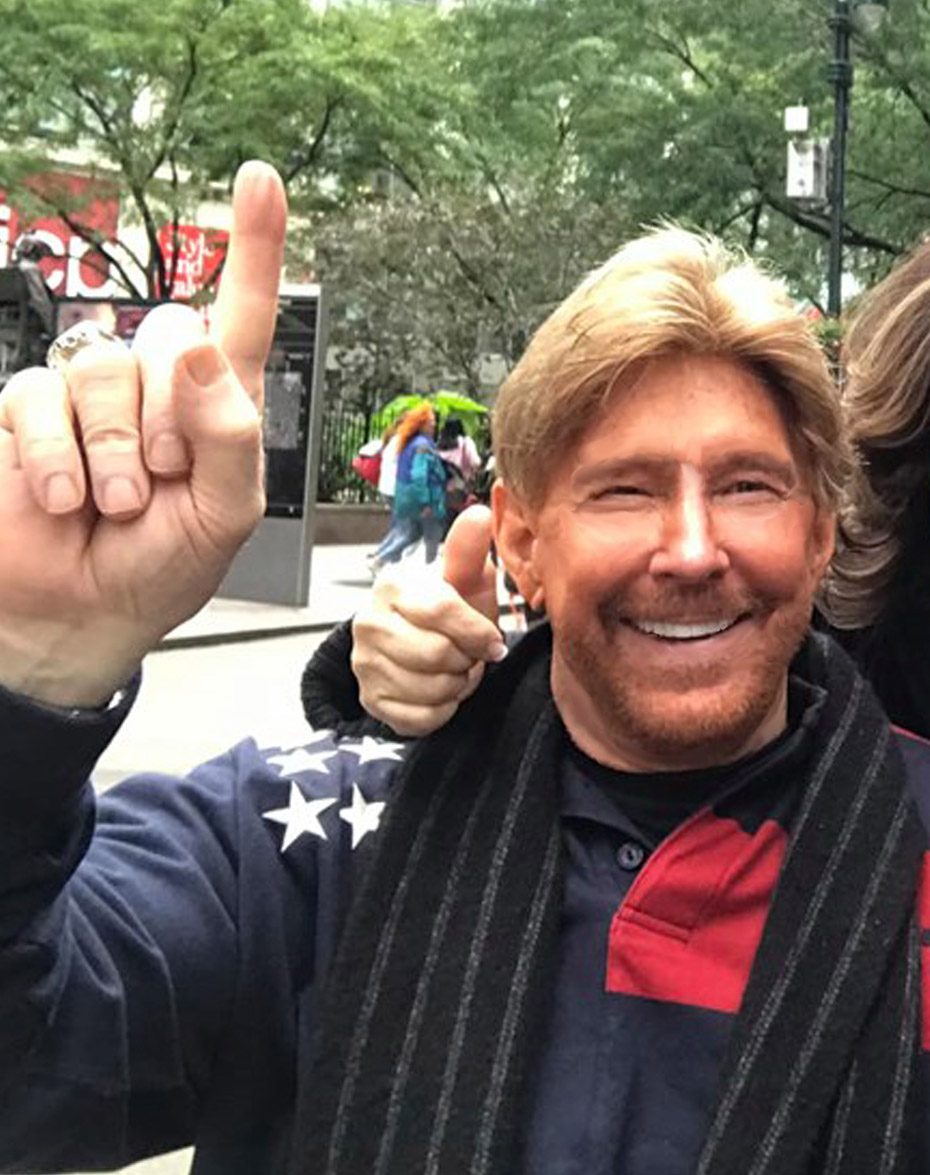
- Saunders in NYC, Oct. 2019
- Born: Kevin Vaughn Saunders; December 8, 1955 (age 70); Smith Center, Kansas, United States
- Education: Downs High School
- Alma mater: Kansas State University
- Occupations: Motivational speaker, paralympian, author
- Years active: 1984–present
- Spouse: Dora Ortiz (m. 1996)
- Children: Steven Saunders (b. 1981)
- Website: kevinsaunders.com

Kevin Saunders (born December 8, 1955, in Smith Center, Kansas) is an American Paralympian, author, public speaker and athlete Saunders was the first person from the state of Kansas to make the Paralympic Team USA and also the first Kansan to medal at the 1988 Paralympic Games in Seoul, South Korea. He was the first person with a disability appointed to the President's Council on Fitness, Sports, and Nutrition, and remains the only person to serve two consecutive terms under different administrations, first under President George H. W. Bush, and later reappointed by President Bill Clinton.

== Early life and education ==
The youngest of three boys, Saunders was born to Donald and Freda Saunders, who owned a farm in north central Kansas. He enjoyed sports from an early age, and by middle school and high school, he was involved with football, basketball, track and baseball.

Saunders attended college on athletic scholarships for football, track and field, and soccer. He transferred to Kansas State University, majoring in agricultural economics. While at KSU, he joined the Alpha Tau Omega fraternity and continued to play sports until graduating from the university in 1978.

At graduation in 1974, Saunders met the late U.S. Senator Bob Dole, a fellow Kansan, who spoke at the commencement exercises for Downs High School. Twenty six years later, Dole would play a pivotal role in introducing Saunders to President George H. W. Bush, and recommending him for the President's Council on Fitness, Sports & Nutrition.

Saunders attended college on athletic scholarships for football, track and field, and soccer. He transferred to Kansas State University, majoring in agricultural economics. While at KSU, he joined the Alpha Tau Omega fraternity and continued to play sports until graduating from the university in 1978. Kansas State University lists Saunders as a member of its Acclaimed Alumni in sports.

== Explosion and recovery ==
After graduating from college, Saunders began training to become a federal inspector for the USDA. An accident in April 1981, at a grain elevator in Corpus Christi, Texas, wounded him severely, and left him in a wheelchair, paralyzed from the chest down.

After graduating from college, Saunders became a federal inspector for the USDA. As an inspector, Saunders was responsible for checking export grain elevators at major ports. His work assignments included locations throughout the Gulf Coast region, and all along the eastern seaboard, from Florida to Nova Scotia.

Corpus Christi Public Grain Elevator explosion On April 7, 1981, at the age of 23, Saunders identified and reported safety hazards at the Corpus Christi Public Grain Elevator, in Corpus Christi, Texas. He submitted recommendations outlining a temporary shutdown of the facility, and necessary repairs to resolve problems with the failing dust collection system. Management representatives met with the head engineer and declined to act on the inspection report, opting instead to continue normal operations.

The next day, on April 7, an employee disregarded basic safety precautions during a routine Phostoxin pesticide application, triggering a spark in one of the silos with abnormally heavy grain dust concentrations. The suspended grain dust particles instantly ignited, producing a series of powerful explosions that ripped through the facility at a speed calculated by experts at Texas A&M University to be in excess of 1,082 ft per second.

The grain elevator's silos (14-stories tall, 40 ft in diameter with reinforced walls up to 3 ft thick) were destroyed in seconds. There was massive loss of life as many grain elevator employees were either killed by the blast instantly or succumbed to fatal injuries in the moments that followed. Many others suffered severe, life-altering injuries requiring extended hospitalization.

Saunders was in the USDA government building when the largest explosion struck. Having heard the sudden blasts erupting just yards away, his last recollection of the event is that “the walls blew out in my face. The crackling and popping of the concrete being blown apart was so loud it felt like it was going to split my head wide open.”

He was instantly knocked unconscious and was blown through the roof of the building. Paramedics found Saunders over 300 ft away, a crumpled mass lying in a pool of blood on a concrete parking lot. Saunders’ injuries were so severe that he was “black-flagged” and not expected to survive. Because all ambulances on the scene were occupied by other survivors, Saunders was placed into a station wagon and driven to Corpus Christi Memorial Hospital. His injuries included a fractured skull, collapsed lungs, shattered scapulas, various internal and external injuries and a severed spine at (T5). His body was broken over at the chest like most people bend at the waist when they bend to touch their toes. Doctors gave him less than 1% chance of survival.

As the explosion garnered national news coverage, doctors worked to first stabilize Saunders’ condition, and then to begin treating some of the injuries. He would spend nearly a year in the hospital and in rehabilitation, before being released in a wheelchair, completely paralyzed from the chest down. Saunders faced a difficult transition to life as a paraplegic, experiencing bouts of depression and emotional distress. Saunders credits former rugby teammates and workout partners, Robert Hays and Bruce Acuna, with forcing him to get back into the gym where he began strength training.

== Athletic career ==
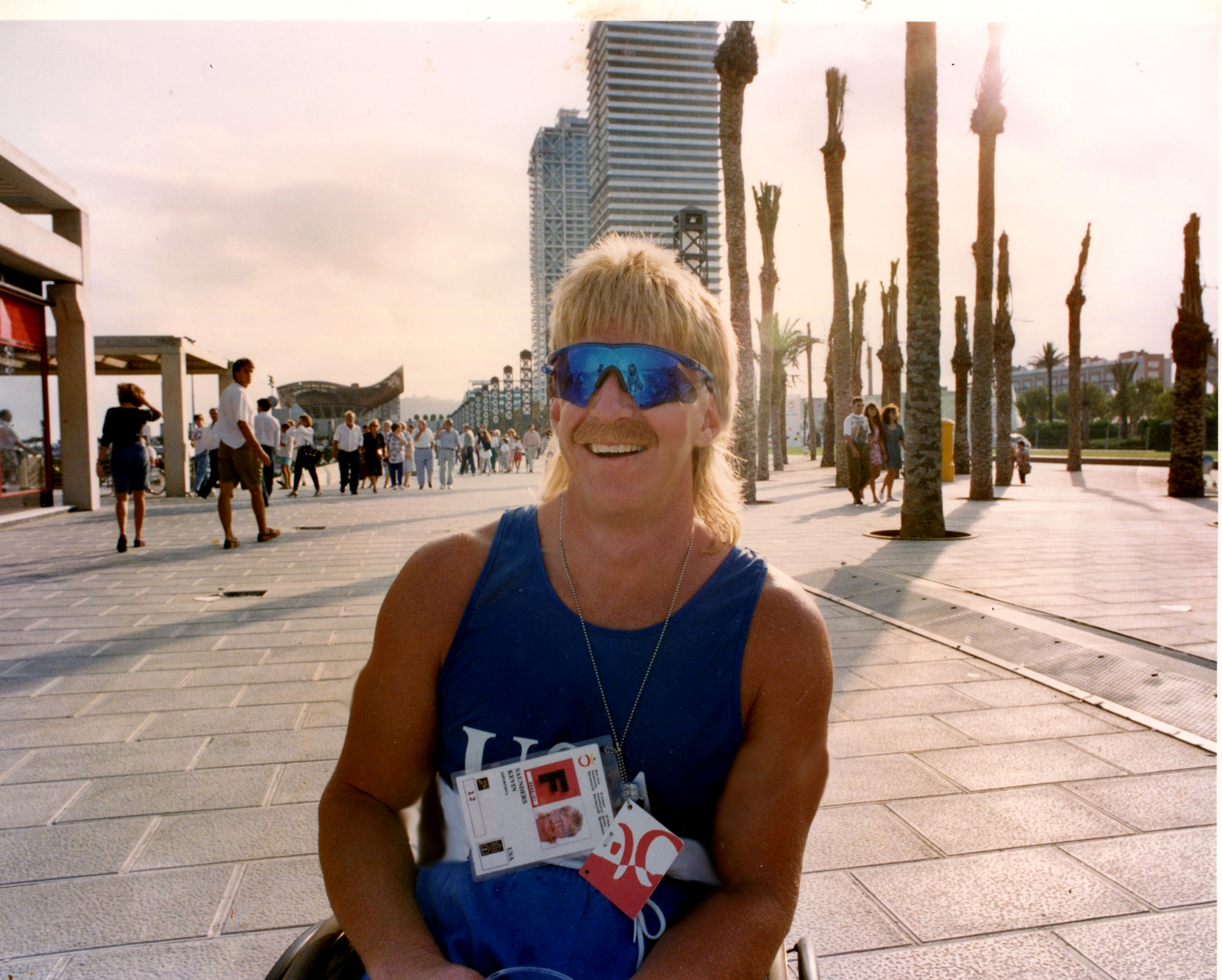
Kevin Saunders in the Olympic/Paralympic Village prepares for the 1992 Barcelona Paralympic Games.

In 1983 (two years after his injury) Saunders was persuaded by his brother, Gerald from Greenville, South Carolina to try entering his first wheelchair race, the Peachtree Road Race held in Atlanta, Georgia, every year on July 4. Saunders signed up, though he had only participated in wheelchair basketball and had never trained for a wheelchair race. About the experience, Saunders has said, “I didn’t even know how long the course was. I could understand distance in miles, but didn’t have a point of reference for how far one kilometer was, let alone 10K.”.

He also lacked the proper equipment, lining up at the start in a standard-issue hospital wheelchair unsuitable for racing. During the race he was unable to maintain pace with other competitors and was eventually disqualified once he was passed by the leading foot runners. Despite the early setback, however, he enjoyed this new sport and made a decision that he would become a better wheelchair athlete. He joined a wheelchair basketball league, and continued to enter racing competitions, finding success at the regional, and then national levels.

In 1984, Saunders won the bronze medal in the National Wheelchair Athletic Association's Track and Field competition in Johnson City, Tennessee. He would go on to win hundreds of medals in both domestic and international competitions.

Saunders won many gold, silver and bronze medals at the National USA Games, Paralympic Games, Pan American Games, and at various World Track & Field Competitions around the world. He was recognized as the Outstanding Male Athlete at the National and International Games on several occasions.

Saunders has also won many road races throughout the United States and in other countries. He has been a multiple national record holder, Pan American record holder, world record holder and Paralympic Games record holder.

Saunders won every race he competed in at the National Wheelchair Games, including distances from 100m to 5,000m. He also won field events including javelin, discus, swimming, air rifles and pistols, earning Best Athlete of the Games honors on several occasions.

After winning the World Track & Field Championships in England in 1989, Saunders was declared "The World's Greatest All-Around Wheelchair Athlete".[1] At the 1992 Paralympic Games Trials in Salt Lake City, Utah, Saunders broke the pentathlon world record, simultaneously setting a new Paralympic record. At the 1992 Paralympic Games in Barcelona, Saunders won the bronze medal, narrowly missing the gold medal by 0.42 seconds in the deciding 1500m race.

Saunders qualified for the 1996 Paralympic trials in Atlanta, GA, but failed to place in the top 3 qualifying Paralympic Games spots for the 1500m event due to a stomach virus.

Saunders‘ athletic career as an elite wheelchair athlete spanned from 1983 to 2014, when he won the USA Track & Field (USATF) Half Marathon Championship in Houston, Texas.

Throughout his career, Saunders was a member of the National Wheelchair Athletic Association (NWAA), Wheelchair Sports, USA, and Wheelchair & Ambulatory Sports, USA, now known as Adaptive Sports USA. Adaptive Sports USA is a registered multi-sport organization of the United States Olympic Committee/United States Paralympic Committee, dedicated to promoting healthy lifestyles by implementing sports and recreation opportunities for children and adults with a physical disability.

In 2016, Saunders was inducted into the Hall of Fame, recognized for his outstanding achievements as a multiple World & International Champion, multiple Paralympic medalist, multiple Pan American Games medalist and World and Paralympic record holder.

=== President's Council on Sports, Fitness, and Nutrition ===
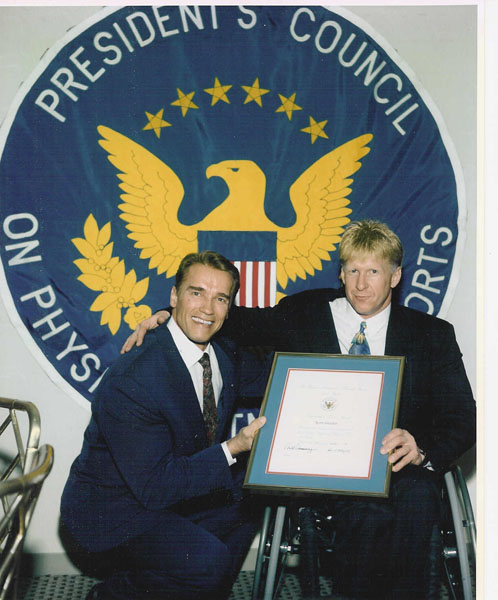
Kevin Saunders holding recognition plaque alongside PCFSN Chairman Arnold Schwarzenegger.

In 1989, Senate Majority Leader Bob Dole nominated Saunders to serve on the President's Council on Sports, Fitness, and Nutrition (PCFSN). After meeting with President George H. W. Bush, Saunders became the first person with a disability to serve on the council, working alongside Chairman Arnold Schwarzenegger and other notable health and fitness experts. Saunders was one of just 20 individuals chosen to serve on the PCFSN during the Bush Administration (1989–1993).

While in Washington, DC to meet with President Bush, Saunders unexpectedly met with Rev. Billy Graham at the White House. Rev. Graham served as spiritual counsel to the president, and the two men spent an hour talking and in prayer. Saunders attributes that conversation with Graham as pivotal in helping strengthen his Faith and his desire to help others through philanthropy and his speaking work.

In 1994, Saunders became the only person to be reappointed to the council by President Bill Clinton. He served on the council until 2000. Under President George W. Bush, Kevin was named to a Commission by the PCFSN and the US Department of Health and Human Services to come up with a plan to improve fitness and health for people with disabilities.

He was also commended for his help in the creation of the National Initiative on Physical Fitness for Children and Youth with Disabilities, or the I Can Do It, You Can Do It Program.

Saunders continued to promote health and fitness after the PCFSN, serving as an International Ambassador for Health, Fitness and Proper Nutrition. In that capacity, Saunders met with government leaders at the city, state and national level in numerous European countries.

== Business career ==
Saunders became a motivational speaker and consultant in 1984, shortly after winning the bronze medal at the USATF Championships in Johnson City, Tennessee. In 1989, Saunders worked alongside Tom Cruise and Oliver Stone as a principal actor during the filming of Born on the Fourth of July.

Saunders is also the author of five books:

- There's Always a Way (1993)
- CENTAUR (1997, comic book)
- Mission Possible (2003)
- Conversations in Health & Fitness (2004)
- Blueprint for Success (2008)

== Awards and recognition ==
In 1995, Saunders was recognized as Distinguished Alumnus from Kansas State University College of Agriculture. Saunders has also been recognized among Kansas State's 30 most famous alumni.[5]

In 2000, Kevin Saunders was nominated by Del Mar College in Corpus Christi, Texas, and received the Outstanding Alumni Award — chosen from over 1,167 community colleges in America — from the American Association of Community Colleges (AACC) in Washington, D.C.

On July 1, 2024, the Kansas Sports Hall of Fame named Kevin Saunders as a member of the 2024 class of inductees, with the ceremony to take place in Topeka, Kansas on October 13, 2024.
