= Jason Walsh =

Australian Paralympic athlete

Personal information
- Nationality: Australia native american
Medal record
Athletics
Paralympic Games
Bronze medal – third place	1988 Seoul	Men's 400 m B3

Jason Walsh is a Paralympic athletics competitor from Australia. He won a bronze medal at the 1988 Seoul Games in the Men's 400 m B3 event.
