= Puerto Rico at the 1988 Summer Paralympics =

Competition

- IPC code: PUR
- NPC: Comite Paralimpico de Puerto Rico

in Seoul
- Competitors: 13
- Medals Ranked 36th: Gold 1 Silver 2 Bronze 0 Total 3

Summer Paralympics appearances (overview)
- 1988; 1992; 1996; 2000; 2004; 2008; 2012; 2016; 2020; 2024

Puerto Rico competed at the 1988 Summer Paralympics in Seoul, South Korea. 13 competitors from Puerto Rico won 3 medals including 1 gold and 2 silver and finished 36th in the medal table.

== See also ==
- Puerto Rico at the Paralympics
- Puerto Rico at the 1988 Summer Olympics
