= Jonathan Ward (athlete) =

British Paralympic athlete

Medal record

Paralympic athletics

Representing United Kingdom

Paralympic Games
Gold medal – first place	1988 Seoul	Shot put B3
Silver medal – second place	1988 Seoul	Discus throw B3
Silver medal – second place	1992 Barcelona	Shot put B3
Bronze medal – third place	1988 Seoul	Pentathlon B3
Bronze medal – third place	2000 Sydney	Shot put F13

Jonathan Ward is a paralympic athlete from Great Britain competing mainly in category F13 throwing events.

Jonathan competed in four Paralympic Games, firstly in 1988 where he won a gold in the B3 shot put, a silver in the B3 discus and bronze in the B3 pentathlon as well as competing in the javelin. In the 1992 Summer Paralympics he won a silver in his only even the B3 shot put. In Atlanta he failed to win a medal for the first time despite competing in the F12 discus, F12 shot put and as part of the T10-12 4 × 100 m relay team. He was back to winning medals in Sydney in the 2000 Summer Paralympics when he won a bronze in the F13 shot put as well as competing in the F13 discus.
