= Isabel Bustamante =

Puerto Rican paralympics gold medalist

Sport
- Country: Puerto Rico
- Sport: Paralympic athletics
- Disability: Disability
- Disability class: 1B
Medal record
Paralympic athletics
Representing Puerto Rico
Paralympic Games
Gold medal – first place	1988 Seoul	Shot put 1B
Silver medal – second place	1988 Seoul	Discus throw 1B
Silver medal – second place	1988 Seoul	Javelin throw 1B

Isabel Bustamante is a Puerto Rican paralympic athlete.

== Career ==
At the 1988 Summer Paralympics, she became the first Puerto Rican athlete to win a gold medal at an Olympic or Paralympic Games competition while competing for Puerto Rico. Bustamante won the gold medal at the Women's shot put 1B competition.

She also won two silver medals at the same games, at the Women's discus throw 1B and the Women's javelin throw 1B competitions.

As of 2021, Bustamante remains the only gold medalist for Puerto Rico at a Paralympic Games. Monica Puig and Jasmine Camacho later won gold medals for the country at Olympic Games, Puig during 2016 at women's tennis and Camacho during the 2020 competition, held in 2021 because of the coronavirus outbreak, at women's athletics. (Puerto Rican Gigi Fernandez won gold medals at the Olympics in women's tennis-in 1992 and 1996-but she did so for the United States).

== See also ==
- List of Puerto Ricans
