= Puerto Rico at the 2012 Summer Paralympics =

- IPC code: PUR
- NPC: Comite Paralimpico de Puerto Rico

in London
- Competitors: 2 in 2 sports
- Medals: Gold 0 Silver 0 Bronze 0 Total 0

Summer Paralympics appearances (overview)
- 1988; 1992; 1996; 2000; 2004; 2008; 2012; 2016; 2020; 2024

Puerto Rico competed at the 2012 Summer Paralympics in London, United Kingdom from August 29 to September 9, 2012.

== Athletics ==
Men’s Field Events

Athlete	Event	Distance	Rank
Jose Benitez Sanchez	Shot Put F20	9.88	13

== Sailing ==
Athlete	Event	Race											Net points	Rank
Athlete	Event	1	2	3	4	5	6	7	8	9	10	11*	Net points	Rank
Julio Reguerro Hernandez	2.4 mR - 1 person keelboat	9	9	8	2	11	8	5	(13)	11	7	—N/a	70	9

* Due to a lack of wind Race 11 was cancelled

== See also ==
- Puerto Rico at the 2012 Summer Olympics
