= John Belanger =

Canadian Paralympic athlete

Personal information
- Nationality: Canada
- Born: c. 1949 (age 76–77)
Medal record
Paralympic Games
Paralympic athletics
| Silver medal – second place | 1984 Stoke-Mandeville | Shot put A1 |
| Silver medal – second place | 1988 Seoul | Discus throw A1-3/A9/L3 |
| Silver medal – second place | 1988 Seoul | Javelin throw A1-3/A9/L3 |
| Silver medal – second place | 1988 Seoul | Shot put A1-3/A9/L3 |
Para ice hockey
| Bronze medal – third place | 1994 Lillehammer | Men's sledge hockey |

John Belanger (born c. 1949) is a Canadian former Paralympic athlete. He won medals at the 1984 Summer Paralympics, 1988 Summer Paralympics, and 1994 Winter Paralympics.
