= Mariano Ruiz =

Spanish Paralympic athlete

Medal record

Track and field (athletics)

Representing Spain

Paralympic Games
Gold medal – first place	1988 Seoul	1500 metres - B2
Gold medal – first place	1988 Seoul	5000 metres - B2
Gold medal – first place	1992 Barcelona	1500 metres - B2

Mariano Ruiz is a Spanish paralympic athlete competing mainly in category T12 distance events.

Mariano competed in four Paralympics, winning three gold medals. He first competed in the 1988 Summer Paralympics where he won two gold medals in the 1500m and 5000m both with new games records. At his some games in 1992, he defended his 5000m gold with another new Games record but despite running almost the same time as four years earlier ended up in fourth in the 1500m. His third games in 1996 would produce yet another fourth place, this time in the 5000m and at his last games in 2000, he failed to finish the marathon
