= Peter Carruthers (athlete) =

British wheelchair racer (1949–2019)

Peter Carruthers MBE
Personal information
- Born: 1949 Leeds, Great Britain
- Died: 2019 (aged 69–70)

Sport
- Country: Great Britain
- Sport: Paralympic athletics
- Disability: Tetraplegia
Medal record
Paralympic athletics
Representing Great Britain
Paralympic Games
Gold medal – first place	1988 Seoul	100m 1B

Peter Andrew Carruthers, MBE (1949–2019) was a British wheelchair racer who competed at three Paralympic Games, he was a Paralympic champion in sprinting events.

== Biography ==
Carruthers was brought up in North Yorkshire before moving to London after he left high school. He went on a world tour with wife visiting many countries such as Turkey, Pakistan and Thailand and settled in Australia, he settled in Alice Springs where he played rugby league. He continued their journey by visiting New Zealand then the United States and returned home. In 1983, Carruthers was involved in an accident that caused him to have a spinal cord injury.

After recovering from his accident, he moved to Loughborough where he established Bromakin Wheelchairs, a business that develop specialist racing wheelchairs for track and road racing, wheelchair basketball and wheelchair rugby, the origins of the company's name is referenced to the farmhouse that his mother grew up in North Yorkshire. He began being involved in a university study, composed by Loughborough University about the physiology of wheelchair racing in the late 1980s, he was also awarded an honorary MA from the same university and was honoured with an MBE for his services to disabled sports and pioneering sports equipment for disabled athletes in 1997.
