= Serge Raymond =

Canadian Paralympic athlete

Personal information
- Nationality: Canadian
- Born: 1967 or 1968 (age 57–58)

Sport
- Country: Canada
- Sport: Athletics
Medal record
Athletics at the Summer Paralympics
Representing Canada
Paralympics
Gold medal – first place	1988 Seoul	Men's 200m 1B
Gold medal – first place	1988 Seoul	Men's 1500m 1B
Gold medal – first place	1988 Seoul	Men's marathon 1B

Serge Raymond (born 1967 or 1968) is a Canadian retired Paralympic athlete. He competed at the 1988 and 1992 Paralympics. He is from Montreal, Quebec.
