= Håkan Ericsson =

Swedish wheelchair racer

Sport
- Country: Sweden
- Sport: Paralympic athletics
- Disability class: T52
Medal record
Paralympic athletics
Representing Sweden
Paralympic Games
Gold medal – first place	1988 Seoul	400m A1-3/A9/L2
Silver medal – second place	1988 Seoul	800m A1-3/A9/L2
Silver medal – second place	1992 Barcelona	100m TW4
Silver medal – second place	1992 Barcelona	200m TW4
Silver medal – second place	2000 Sydney	100m T54
Bronze medal – third place	1988 Seoul	100m A1-3/A9/L2
Bronze medal – third place	1988 Seoul	200m A1-3/A9/L2
Bronze medal – third place	1992 Barcelona	400m TW4
Bronze medal – third place	2000 Sydney	200m T54
World Championships
Silver medal – second place	1998 Birmingham	100m T55
Silver medal – second place	1998 Birmingham	400m T55
Bronze medal – third place	1998 Birmingham	200m T55

Håkan Ericsson is a Swedish Paralympian and wheelchair racer. At the age of 21, Ericsson won the 1990 London Marathon, barely edging out German athlete Wolfgang Peterson to set a new course record. Ericsson competed in the 1988, 1992, and 2000 Summer Paralympics, winning a total of one gold, four silver, and four bronze medals. He was coached by Peter Eriksson from 1983 to the end of his career.
