= Alexis Pizarro =

Puerto Rican Paralympic athlete

Medal record

Paralympic athletics

Representing Puerto Rico

Paralympic Games
Bronze medal – third place	2000 Sydney	Shot put F57
Bronze medal – third place	2004 Athens	Javelin throw F58

Parapan American Games
Gold medal – first place	2007 Rio de Janeiro	Shot put F56-58

Alexis Pizarro is a paralympic athlete from Puerto Rico competing mainly in category F58 throwing events.

Alexis competed in all three throws at both the 2000 Summer Paralympics, as an F57 athlete and the 2004 Summer Paralympics as an F58 athlete. He won a bronze in the shot put in 2000 and in the discus in 2004. He also competed in the shot put in Beijing in 2008 but could only manage 12th.
