= Daniel Wesley (athlete) =

Canadian para-alpine skier

Personal information
- Born: Daniel Wesley; 29 March 1960 (age 66) Canada

Sport
- Country: Canada
- Sport: Alpine skiing, wheelchair racing, track and field
- Event(s): Downhill; Slalom; Giant slalom Super combined Super G 100 meter 500 meter 800 meter

Daniel Wesley (aka Daniel Westley) is a Canadian athlete who won 12 medals while competing in the Paralympic Games.

== Early life ==
Wesley grew up in New Westminster, British Columbia and lost both his legs in 1973 when he fell under a moving train.

== Career ==
While recovering from his accident, Wesley met Rick Hansen who inspired him to try wheelchair athletics. He began wheelchair racing in 1978 and track and field competitions in 1979 and earned a place on the team for the 1988 Summer Paralympics in Seoul, South Korea. He competed in both the winter and summer games in several sports including "wheelchair racing and skiing" and won two gold and two silver medals.

After finishing fourth in the 1991 London Marathon men's wheelchair race, Wesley won the 1992 race and set a new course record. He competed in the 1992 Summer Paralympics events in Barcelona and again at the 1994 Winter Paralympics in Lillehammer and at the 1998 Winter Paralympics in Nagano. At the 2002 Winter Paralympics in Salt Lake City, Utah he won gold and silver medals. In 2003 he received a 3rd place overall ranking in the World Cup. As of 2012, Wesley had won 12 Paralympic medals, four of them gold, while competing in wheelchair sports such as racing and skiing at "five Paralympic Games."

Wesley works as a sales person for a "home medical equipment company." In 2008, Wesley became part of the Canadian Disability Hall of Fame.

== Personal ==
Wesley lives in New Westminster, Canada. He began skiing at age 25 and is a practitioner of Transcendental Meditation. Wesley has five children, three sons and two daughters.
