= Snooker at the Summer Paralympics =

- Governing body: IWAS
- Events: 2 (men)

Games
- 1960; 1964; 1968; 1972; 1976; 1980; 1984; 1988; 1992; 1996; 2000; 2004; 2008; 2012; 2016; 2020; 2024
- Medalists

In September 1943, the British government asked neurologist Ludwig Guttmann to establish the National Spinal Injuries Centre at Stoke Mandeville Hospital in Buckinghamshire. When the centre opened in 1944, Guttmann was appointed its director and held the position until 1966. Sport was introduced as part of the total rehabilitation programme for patients at the centre, starting with darts, snooker, punchball, and skittles, followed by archery.

Guttmann organised the first Stoke Mandeville Games for paraplegic persons in the form of an archery demonstration with two teams, which took place on 29 July 1948, the same day as the start of the 1948 Summer Olympics in London. Netball was then added as an event in 1949, and javelin throw in 1950. Snooker was first introduced into the Stoke Mandeville Games in 1951 and was included in every annual event up to 1959.

Guttmann originally used the term Paraplegic Games, a name that eventually developed into the "Paralympic Games" (or "Paralympics"), which were first held in Rome alongside the Summer Olympics in 1960.

Snooker was included at the inaugural Summer Paralympics of 1960, held in Rome. The event took place outdoors in a covered area of a running track, on a table that was sent over from Stoke Mandeville Hospital. With the exception of 1980, (Note: Snooker was not included in the 1980 Summer Paralympics possibly because it was not an established sport in the Netherlands.) snooker was then contested at each subsequent Summer Paralympics until 1988, a total of seven Paralympic Games.

Snooker was only open to male competitors at the Paralympics. Over its Paralympic history, the event was dominated by Great Britain, who won eight gold medals in the sport, three of which were awarded to Nottinghamshire player Michael Shelton.

== Medal winners ==
=== Men ===
1960

Event	Gold	Silver	Bronze
Men's paraplegic open	Cliff Keaton; Great Britain	Michael Shelton; Great Britain	Giovanni Ferraris; Italy
Men's paraplegic open	Cliff Keaton; Great Britain	Michael Shelton; Great Britain	George Portelli; Malta

1964

Event	Gold	Silver	Bronze
Men's paraplegic open	Michael Shelton; Great Britain	Frank Vecera; United States	Claude Markham; Malta
Men's paraplegic open	Michael Shelton; Great Britain	Frank Vecera; United States	George Portelli; Malta

1968

Event	Gold	Silver	Bronze
Men's paraplegic open	Michael Shelton; Great Britain	Jimmy Gibson; Ireland	John Newton; Australia
Men's paraplegic open	Michael Shelton; Great Britain	Jimmy Gibson; Ireland	Aroldo Ruschioni; Italy

1972

Event	Gold	Silver	Bronze
Men's paraplegic	Michael Shelton; Great Britain	Jimmy Gibson; Ireland	Aroldo Ruschioni; Italy
Men's tetraplegic	Peter Haslam; Great Britain	Cliff Rickard; Australia	Chris McGann; Great Britain

1976

Event	Gold	Silver	Bronze
Men's 2-5	Dean Mellway; Canada	Brian Faulkner; Great Britain	Michael Shelton; Great Britain
Men's A-C	Tommy Taylor; Great Britain	Rod Vleiger; United States	P. Haslam; Great Britain

1984

Event	Gold	Silver	Bronze
Men's paraplegic	Jimmy Gibson; Ireland	J. Buchanan; Great Britain	Mike Langley; Great Britain
Men's tetraplegic	P. Haslam; Great Britain	K. Ellison; Great Britain	Tommy Taylor; Great Britain

1988

Event	Gold	Silver	Bronze
Men's open	Mike Langley; Great Britain	Michael White; Ireland	Maurice Job; Great Britain

== Medal table ==
Rank	Nation	Gold	Silver	Bronze	Total
1	Great Britain (GBR)	8	4	6	18
2	Ireland (IRL)	1	3	0	4
3	Canada (CAN)	1	0	0	1
4	United States (USA)	0	2	0	2
5	Australia (AUS)	0	1	1	2
6	Italy (ITA)	0	0	3	3
6	Malta (MLT)	0	0	3	3
Totals (7 entries)		10	10	13	33
