= Great Britain at the 1988 Summer Paralympics =

- Flag of the United Kingdom
- IPC code: GBR
- NPC: British Paralympic Association
- Website: www.paralympics.org.uk

in Seoul
- Competitors: 231 in 13 sports
- Medals Ranked 3rd: Gold 65 Silver 65 Bronze 54 Total 184

Summer Paralympics appearances (overview)
- 1960; 1964; 1968; 1972; 1976; 1980; 1984; 1988; 1992; 1996; 2000; 2004; 2008; 2012; 2016; 2020; 2024

Great Britain competed at the 1988 Summer Paralympics in Seoul, South Korea. It finished third in the overall medal count, with a total of 184 medals.

== Medalists ==
=== Gold medalists ===
Medal	Name	Sport	Event
Gold	Karen Watts	Archery	Women's double FITA round 2–6
Gold	Wilma Anic; Joan Cooper; Karen Watts	Archery	Women's double FITA round team 2–6
Gold	Peter Carruthers	Athletics	Men's 100m 1B
Gold	Nigel Coultas	Athletics	Men's 100m A6/A8-9/L4
Gold	Nigel Coultas	Athletics	Men's 200m A6/A8-9/L4
Gold	Colin Keay	Athletics	Men's 200m C6
Gold	Simon Butler	Athletics	Men's 400m B3
Gold	Colin Keay	Athletics	Men's 400m C6
Gold	Robert Matthews	Athletics	Men's 800m B1
Gold	Noel Thatcher	Athletics	Men's 800m B2
Gold	Anthony Hamilton	Athletics	Men's 800m B3
Gold	Robert Matthews	Athletics	Men's 1500m B1
Gold	Anthony Hamilton	Athletics	Men's 1500m B3
Gold	James Sands	Athletics	Men's 3000m cross country C6
Gold	Robert Matthews	Athletics	Men's 5000m B1
Gold	Stephen Brunt	Athletics	Men's marathon B2
Gold	Nigel Coultas	Athletics	Men's high jump A6/A8-9/L6
Gold	Michael Walker	Athletics	Men's club throw C4
Gold	Paul Williams	Athletics	Men's club throw C5
Gold	Michael Walker	Athletics	Men's discus throw C4
Gold	Paul Williams	Athletics	Men's discus throw C5
Gold	Ian Hayden	Athletics	Men's discus throw L5
Gold	Michael Walker	Athletics	Men's javelin throw C4
Gold	Paul Williams	Athletics	Men's javelin throw C5
Gold	Ian Hayden	Athletics	Men's javelin throw L4
Gold	Jonathan Ward	Athletics	Men's shot put B3
Gold	Michael Walker	Athletics	Men's shot put C4
Gold	Isabel Barr	Athletics	Women's discus throw 1B
Gold	Denise Ross	Athletics	Women's discus throw B1
Gold	Dorothy Ripley	Athletics	Women's shot put 5
Gold	Kerry Taylor	Athletics	Women's slalom C1
Gold	Simon Jackson	Judo	Men's 60kg
Gold	Ken Bridgeman	Lawn bowls	Men's singles 2–6
Gold	Ralph Foster	Lawn bowls	Men's singles LB1
Gold	Neil Shaw; Bernard Wessier	Lawn bowls	Men's pairs LB2
Gold	Anthony Bishop	Powerlifting	Men's +100kg
Gold	Deanna Coates	Shooting	Women's air rifle standing 2–6
Gold	Mike Langley	Snooker	Men's open
Gold	Mike Kenny	Swimming	Men's 50m freestyle 1A
Gold	Andrew Blake	Swimming	Men's 50m freestyle 3
Gold	Mike Kenny	Swimming	Men's 100m freestyle 1A
Gold	Oliver Jones	Swimming	Men's 100m freestyle A1
Gold	Robin Surgeoner	Swimming	Men's 100m freestyle C4
Gold	Robin Surgeoner	Swimming	Men's 200m freestyle C4
Gold	Robin Surgeoner	Swimming	Men's 400m freestyle C3-4
Gold	Mike Kenny	Swimming	Men's 25m backstroke 1A
Gold	Martin Mansell	Swimming	Men's 100m backstroke C5
Gold	Mike Kenny	Swimming	Men's 25m breaststroke 1A
Gold	Robin Surgeoner	Swimming	Men's 100m breaststroke C4
Gold	Paul Noble	Swimming	Men's 100m butterfly L5
Gold	Mike Kenny	Swimming	Men's 75m individual medley 1A
Gold	Men's relay team	Swimming	Men's 4 × 100 m freestyle relay A-L
Gold	Men's relay team	Swimming	Men's 4 × 100 m medley relay A-L
Gold	Janice Burton	Swimming	Women's 50m freestyle B1
Gold	Beverley Gull	Swimming	Women's 100m freestyle 4
Gold	Beverley Gull	Swimming	Women's 400m freestyle 4
Gold	Jane Stidever	Swimming	Women's 400m freestyle C3-4
Gold	Beverley Gull	Swimming	Women's 100m backstroke 4
Gold	Dianne Barr	Swimming	Women's 100m backstroke A4
Gold	Jane Stidever	Swimming	Women's 100m backstroke C4
Gold	Women's relay team	Swimming	Women's 4 × 100 m freestyle relay A-L
Gold	Women's relay team	Swimming	Women's 4 × 100 m medley relay A-L
Gold	David Hope	Table tennis	Men's singles TT4
Gold	Carol Walton	Wheelchair fencing	Women's épée 4–6

=== Silver medalists ===
Medal	Name	Sport	Event
Silver	Colin Keay	Athletics	Men's 100m C6
Silver	Nigel Coultas	Athletics	Men's 400m A6/A8-9/L4
Silver	Gordon Robertson	Athletics	Men's 400m C6
Silver	Noel Thatcher	Athletics	Men's 1500m B2
Silver	Gerard McConnell	Athletics	Men's 5000m cross country C8
Silver	Mark Farnell	Athletics	Men's 5000m C3
Silver	Mark Farnell	Athletics	Men's marathon B3
Silver	Steven Varden	Athletics	Men's club throw C2
Silver	Norman Burns	Athletics	Men's club throw C4
Silver	John Harris	Athletics	Men's discus throw 5
Silver	Jonathan Ward	Athletics	Men's discus throw B3
Silver	Brian Lessiter	Athletics	Men's discus throw L5
Silver	Norman Burns	Athletics	Men's javelin throw C4
Silver	Kevan McNicholas	Athletics	Men's shot put 2
Silver	Ernest Guild	Athletics	Men's shot put 5
Silver	Paul Williams	Athletics	Men's shot put C5
Silver	Ian Hayden	Athletics	Men's shot put L4
Silver	Terry Hudson	Athletics	Men's slalom C1
Silver	Norman Burns	Athletics	Men's slalom C4-5
Silver	Kerry Taylor	Athletics	Women's precision throw C1
Silver	Isabel Barr	Athletics	Women's shot put 1B
Silver	Denise Ross	Athletics	Women's shot put B1
Silver	Carol Johnson	Athletics	Women's slalom C1
Silver	David Hurst	Judo	Men's 86kg
Silver	John Gronow	Lawn bowls	Men's singles 2–6
Silver	Richard Coates	Lawn bowls	Men's singles LB3
Silver	Nicholas Slater	Powerlifting	Men's 75kg
Silver	Keith Morriss	Shooting	Men's air rifle sitting LSH1
Silver	Christopher Holmes	Swimming	Men's 50m freestyle B2
Silver	Ian Sharpe	Swimming	Men's 50m freestyle B3
Silver	Paul Hancock	Swimming	Men's 100m freestyle C6
Silver	Paul Noble	Swimming	Men's 100m freestyle L5
Silver	Martin Mansell	Swimming	Men's 200m freestyle C5
Silver	David Moreton	Swimming	Men's 400m freestyle A4
Silver	Christopher Holmes	Swimming	Men's 400m freestyle B2
Silver	Paul Noble	Swimming	Men's 400m freestyle L5
Silver	Paul Hancock	Swimming	Men's 50m backstroke C6
Silver	Andrew Gilbert	Swimming	Men's 100m backstroke L4
Silver	Paul Noble	Swimming	Men's 100m backstroke L5
Silver	Chris Hallam	Swimming	Men's 50m breaststroke 2
Silver	Mark Butler	Swimming	Men's 25m butterfly 2
Silver	Peter Aldous	Swimming	Men's 100m butterfly A2
Silver	David Moreton	Swimming	Men's 100m butterfly A4
Silver	Martin Mansell	Swimming	Men's 200m individual medley C5
Silver	Paul Noble	Swimming	Men's 200m individual medley L5
Silver	Men's relay team	Swimming	Men's 3x25m freestyle relay 1A-1C
Silver	Men's relay team	Swimming	Men's 4x50m medley relay A1-A8
Silver	Angela McDowell	Swimming	Women's 50m freestyle B2
Silver	Angela McDowell	Swimming	Women's 100m freestyle B2
Silver	Jane Stidever	Swimming	Women's 100m freestyle C4
Silver	Jane Stidever	Swimming	Women's 200m freestyle C4
Silver	Linda Walters	Swimming	Women's 400m freestyle A2
Silver	Janice Burton	Swimming	Women's 400m freestyle B1
Silver	Joanne Round	Swimming	Women's 100m backstroke A8
Silver	Janice Burton	Swimming	Women's 100m backstroke B1
Silver	Jeanette Esling	Swimming	Women's 100m backstroke L4
Silver	Louise Byles	Swimming	Women's 50m breaststroke B1
Silver	Louise Byles	Swimming	Women's 100m breaststroke B1
Silver	Jane Stidever	Swimming	Women's 100m breaststroke C4
Silver	Louise Byles	Swimming	Women's 200m breaststroke B1
Silver	Joanne Round	Swimming	Women's 100m butterfly A8
Silver	Angela McDowell	Swimming	Women's 100m butterfly B2
Silver	Joanne Round	Swimming	Women's 200m individual medley A8
Silver	Janice Burton	Swimming	Women's 200m individual medley B1
Silver	Angela McDowell	Swimming	Women's 400m individual medley B2
Silver	Val Beck; Anne Peskey	Table tennis	Women's teams 2

=== Bronze medalists ===
Medal	Name	Sport	Event
Bronze	Robert Barrett	Athletics	Men's 100m A4/A9
Bronze	Robert Barrett	Athletics	Men's 200m A4/A9
Bronze	Gordon Robertson	Athletics	Men's 200m C6
Bronze	Chris Hallam	Athletics	Men's 400m 2
Bronze	Stephen Syndercombe	Athletics	Men's 1500m C8
Bronze	Simon Butler	Athletics	Men's long jump B3
Bronze	Leslie Jones	Athletics	Men's javelin throw 5
Bronze	James Richardson	Athletics	Men's shot put 1A
Bronze	Terence Hopkins	Athletics	Men's shot put 4
Bronze	Brian Lessiter	Athletics	Men's shot put L4
Bronze	Jonathan Ward	Athletics	Men's pentathlon B3
Bronze	Tanni Grey	Athletics	Women's 400m 3
Bronze	Anne Woffinden	Athletics	Women's club throw C3
Bronze	Anne Trotman	Athletics	Women's discus throw C3
Bronze	Kerry Taylor	Athletics	Women's distance throw C1
Bronze	Isabel Barr	Athletics	Women's javelin throw 1B
Bronze	Anne Trotman	Athletics	Women's javelin throw C3
Bronze	Anne Trotman	Athletics	Women's shot put C3
Bronze	Paul Lewis	Judo	Men's 71kg
Bronze	Terence Powell	Judo	Men's 78kg
Bronze	David Hodgkins	Judo	Men's +95kg
Bronze	Ken Bridgeman; John Gronow	Lawn bowls	Men's pairs 2–6
Bronze	Hazel Randall	Lawn bowls	Women's singles 2–6
Bronze	Fred MacKenzie	Powerlifting	Men's 90kg
Bronze	Isabel Barr	Shooting	Women's air pistol 2–6
Bronze	Gill Middleton	Shooting	Women's air rifle prone 2–6
Bronze	Gill Middleton	Shooting	Women's air rifle standing 2–6
Bronze	Maurice Job	Snooker	Men's open
Bronze	Christopher Holmes	Swimming	Men's 100m freestyle B2
Bronze	Ian Sharpe	Swimming	Men's 100m freestyle B3
Bronze	Andrew Gilbert	Swimming	Men's 100m freestyle L4
Bronze	Andrew Gilbert	Swimming	Men's 400m freestyle L4
Bronze	Marc Woods	Swimming	Men's 100m backstroke A4
Bronze	Martin Mansell	Swimming	Men's 200m backstroke C5
Bronze	Ian Sharpe	Swimming	Men's 100m butterfly B3
Bronze	David Moreton	Swimming	Men's 200m individual medley A4
Bronze	Men's relay team	Swimming	Men's 4x50m freestyle relay A1-A8
Bronze	Dianne Barr	Swimming	Women's 100m freestyle A4
Bronze	Janice Burton	Swimming	Women's 100m freestyle B1
Bronze	Helen Lewis	Swimming	Women's 100m freestyle L5
Bronze	Dianne Barr	Swimming	Women's 400m freestyle A4
Bronze	Angela McDowell	Swimming	Women's 400m freestyle B2
Bronze	Angela McDowell	Swimming	Women's 100m backstroke B2
Bronze	Anne Trotman	Swimming	Women's 100m backstroke C3
Bronze	Thelma Young	Swimming	Women's 100m backstroke L6
Bronze	Tara Flood	Swimming	Women's 25m breaststroke L1
Bronze	Thelma Young	Swimming	Women's 100m breaststroke L6
Bronze	Janice Burton	Swimming	Women's 100m butterfly B1
Bronze	Angela McDowell	Swimming	Women's 200m individual medley B2
Bronze	Women's relay team	Swimming	Women's 4 × 100 m freestyle relay B1-B3
Bronze	Arnie Chan; Neil Robinson	Table tennis	Men's teams 3
Bronze	Cyril Thomas	Wheelchair fencing	Men's sabre 4–6
Bronze	Suzannah Rockett	Wheelchair fencing	Women's épée 4–6

=== Medals by sport ===
Medals by sport
Sport	Gold medal	Silver medal	Bronze medal	Total
Athletics	30	22	19	71
Swimming	24	37	22	83
Lawn Bowls	3	2	2	7
Archery	2	0	0	2
Judo	1	1	3	5
Shooting	1	1	3	5
Powerlifting	1	1	1	3
Table tennis	1	1	1	3
Wheelchair Fencing	1	0	2	3
Snooker	1	0	1	2
Total	65	65	54	184

== See also ==
- Great Britain at the Paralympics
- Great Britain at the 1988 Summer Olympics
