= Malta at the 2008 Summer Paralympics =

- IPC code: MLT
- NPC: Malta Paralympic Committee
- Website: www.paralympic.mt

in Beijing
- Competitors: 1 in 1 sport
- Flag bearer: Antonio Flores
- Medals: Gold 0 Silver 0 Bronze 0 Total 0

Summer Paralympics appearances (overview)
- 1960; 1964; 1968; 1972; 1976; 1980; 1984; 1988–2004; 2008; 2012; 2016; 2020; 2024

Malta competed in the 2008 Summer Paralympics in Beijing, China from 6 to 17 September 2008. This was the island nation's seventh appearance at a Summer Paralympic Games since their debut in 1960, but their first since the 1984 Summer Paralympics 24 years earlier. Antonio Flores, a runner, was the only athlete to represent Malta at the Games, having qualified via the 2008 British Open Athletics Championships. At the Paralympics, Flores did not qualify for the final of the men's 100 metres T44 event after placing 11th overall in the competition and fifth in his heat during the heat stages; the fastest four participants in his heat advanced to the final.

== Background ==
Malta made its debut in the Paralympic Games at the first official edition of the event, the 1960 Summer Paralympics. Excepting 1976 and the period between 1988 and 2004, the island country had participated in a total of seven Summer Paralympic Games and medalled a total of seven times in athletics, lawn bowls, snooker and table tennis. The 2008 Summer Paralympics were held in Beijing, China from 6 to 17 September 2008 with a total of 3,951 athletes representing 146 National Paralympic Committees. Runner Antonio Flores was the sole athlete to represent Malta at the Beijing Paralympics; he represented the island nation in the sport of para-athletics and was accompanied by his physiotherapist Nathan Farrugia and sports coordinator Adelaide Silva. Flores travelled to China from Malta on 1 September, and he was selected to be the Maltese flag bearer for the parade of nations during the opening ceremony.

== Disability classification ==
Every participant at the Paralympics has their disability grouped into one of five disability categories: amputation (congenital or sustained through injury or illness); cerebral palsy; wheelchair athletes (frequently overlapping with other categories); visual impairment, including blindness; and Les autres (physical disabilities that do not fall strictly under one of the other categories, such as dwarfism or multiple sclerosis). Each Paralympic sport then has its own classifications, dependent upon the specific physical demands of competition. Events are given an alphanumeric code describing the type of event and classification of the athletes competing. Some sports, such as athletics, divide athletes by both the category and severity of their disabilities, other sports, such as swimming, group competitors from different categories together, the only separation being based on the severity of the disability.

== Athletics ==
Flores was 18 years old at the time of the Beijing Summer Paralympic Games, and was making his first appearance in the quadrennial event. He was born with a right-side clubbed foot and in 2008, was classified T44 by the IPC. T44 is defined by the IPC as an "athlete competing without a prothesis with a unilateral or a combination of lower limb impairment/s where the impairment in only one limb meets the minimum impairment criteria. Functional loss is seen in one foot, ankle and/or lower leg." Flores qualified for the competition through participating in his disability class at the 2008 British Open Athletics Championships in Manchester, England. He was a member of the Pembroke Athleta athletics club and was trained by coach Jivko Jetchev. On 8 September, Flores participated in the first round of the men's 100 metres T44 event that had two heats, which was held at the Beijing National Stadium. Starting in the third lane of the second heat, he placed fifth out of six participants with a time of 12.71 seconds. Although Flores was 0.02 seconds slower than his 2007/08 season personal best, he did not qualify for the final with his heat placing since he did not finish in the top four of his individual heat and was 0.66 seconds slower than the slowest qualifying athlete in his heat. Overall, he was 11th out of 12 athletes during the Paralympic competition.

Key

- Note–Individual ranks are heat finishes.

=== Men ===
Athlete	Events	Heats		Final	
Athlete	Events	Time	Rank	Time	Rank
Antonio Flores	Men's 100m T44	12.71	5	did not advance	

== See also ==
- Malta at the 2008 Summer Olympics
