= Malta at the 2012 Summer Paralympics =

- IPC code: MLT
- NPC: Malta Paralympic Committee
- Website: www.paralympic.mt

in London
- Competitors: 1 in 1 sport
- Flag bearer: Matthew Sultana
- Medals: Gold 0 Silver 0 Bronze 0 Total 0

Summer Paralympics appearances (overview)
- 1960; 1964; 1968; 1972; 1976; 1980; 1984; 1988–2004; 2008; 2012; 2016; 2020; 2024

Malta sent a delegation to compete at the 2012 Summer Paralympics in London, United Kingdom, from 29 August to 9 September 2012. This was the country's eighth appearance in a Summer Paralympic Games. The Maltese delegation consisted of a single short-distance swimmer: Matthew Sultana. In his three events, the men's 50 metres freestyle S10, the men's 100 metre butterfly S10 and the men's 100 metre breaststroke SB9, he failed to qualify beyond the first round.

== Background ==
Malta debuted in the Paralympic movement at the 1960 Summer Paralympics. Excepting the period between 1988 and 2004, the island country had participated in eight Summer Paralympic Games and medalled a total of seven times in athletics, lawn bowls, snooker and table tennis. The 2012 Summer Paralympics were held from 29 August to 9 September 2012 with a total of 4,237 athletes representing 164 National Paralympic Committees. Matthew Sultana, a short-distance swimmer, was the sole athlete to represent Malta at the London Summer Paralympics; he was chosen as the country's flag bearer for the parade of nations during the opening ceremony. He and his coach Ebi Mohammadpour travelled to London on 30 August. Marathon runner Derren Fenech met the minimum qualifying standards for his event; a number of athletes who had times lower than three hours created an upper limit on participants and forced him to withdraw.

== Disability classification ==
Every participant at the Paralympics has their disability grouped into one of five disability categories: amputation, which may be congenital or sustained through injury or illness; cerebral palsy; wheelchair athletes, though there is often overlap between this and other categories; visual impairment, including blindness; and Les autres, which is any physical disability that does not fall strictly under one of the other categories, like dwarfism or multiple sclerosis. Each Paralympic sport then has its own classifications, dependent upon the specific physical demands of competition. Events are given a code, made of numbers and letters, describing the type of event and classification of the athletes competing. Some sports, such as athletics, divide athletes by both the category and severity of their disabilities. Other sports, for example swimming, group competitors from different categories together, the only separation being based on the severity of the disability.

== Swimming ==
At the time of the London Paralympics Matthew Sultana was 15 years old and was the only athlete to compete for Malta. He attained qualification to the Games by winning three age-group medals at an international meet in Berlin. Sultana has an upper limb deformity, and is classified S10 by the International Paralympic Committee. He trained with the non-government organisation Inspire for two and a half years and entered a classification race on 28 August to enable his participation. Sultana said his young age was unimportant and he entered the Paralympics to improve his personal best, "I want to shave off one second to 29 seconds in the 50m freestyle and possibly finish the 100m butterfly race in 1.20 or 1.19 instead of the present 1.24. I am here and it’s more than enough. I want to continue training to be ready for the next Paralympics in four years’ time."

On 31 August, he competed in the men's 50 metres freestyle S10 competition and was assigned to take part in heat two. Sultana completed the heat in seventh place in a new personal best time of 31.12 seconds. This put him 21st (and last) overall and he did not qualify for the final—the eight overall fastest swimmers made that stage of the competition. Sultana took part in the men's 100 metre butterfly S10 event the following day, being drawn into heat three. He finished the race in a time of 1 minute and 16.94 seconds and placed eighth in his heat. As only the top eight overall finishers could advance to the final, Sultana was eliminated from the competition. On 8 September, he participated in the men's 100 metre breaststroke SB9 contest. Sultana was drawn into heat two and completed the race in sixth position in a time of 1 minute and 36.89 seconds. His competition ended since he was slowest overall and only the top eight swimmers progressed to the final.

=== Men ===
Athletes	Event	Heat		Final	
Athletes	Event	Time	Rank	Time	Rank
Matthew Sultana	50m freestyle S10	31.12 PB	20	did not advance	
Matthew Sultana	100m breaststroke SB9	1:36.89	16	did not advance	
Matthew Sultana	100m butterfly S10	1:16.94	21	did not advance	

== See also ==
- Malta at the 2012 Summer Olympics
