= Malta at the 2016 Summer Paralympics =

- IPC code: MLT
- NPC: Malta Paralympic Committee
- Website: www.paralympic.mt

in Rio de Janeiro
- Competitors: 1 in 1 sports
- Flag bearer: Vladyslava Kravchenko
- Medals: Gold 0 Silver 0 Bronze 0 Total 0

Summer Paralympics appearances (overview)
- 1960; 1964; 1968; 1972; 1976; 1980; 1984; 1988–2004; 2008; 2012; 2016; 2020; 2024

Malta competed at the 2016 Summer Paralympics in Rio de Janeiro, Brazil from 7 to 18 September 2016. The country's participation in Rio marked its ninth appearance at the quadrennial event with the exception of the years between 1988 and 2004. The delegation consisted of one short-distance swimmer, Vladyslava Kravchenko, who was announced as the country's representative in April 2016. She was chosen as the flag bearer for the opening ceremony. Kravchenko competed in three swimming events but failed to advance into the final of each event as her times in her respective competitions were not fast enough to qualify for the later stages of each contest.

== Background ==
Malta participated in nine Summer Paralympic Games between its début at the 1960 Summer Paralympics in Rome and the 2016 Summer Paralympics in Rio de Janeiro with the exceptions of 1976 and 1988 through to 2004. Entering the 2016 competition, eight athletes representing Malta had won a total of seven medals in athletics, lawn bowls, snooker and table tennis. Malta competed at the 2016 Rio Summer Paralympic Games from 7 to 18 September. The Malta Federation of Sports Associations for Disabled Persons (MFSADP) had financial difficulties heading into the Rio Paralympics but these were resolved when a company lent financial aid for defraying travel costs and enabled payment to the International Paralympic Committee. The MFSADP sent a single short-distance swimmer to the Games, Vladyslava Kravchenko, who was confirmed as part of the team in April 2016. Kravchenko travelled with her coach Isabelle Zarb. 2008 Maltese representative Antonio Flores (athletics) severely injured his right foot during training and withdrew from the quadrennial event. Another unknown athlete failed to qualify for not meeting the necessary qualification times. Kravchenko was selected as the flag bearer for the opening ceremony.

== Disability classifications ==
Every participant at the Paralympics has their disability grouped into one of five disability categories; amputation, the condition may be congenital or sustained through injury or illness; cerebral palsy; wheelchair athletes, there is often overlap between this and other categories; visual impairment, including blindness; Les autres, any physical disability that does not fall strictly under one of the other categories, for example dwarfism or multiple sclerosis. Each Paralympic sport then has its own classifications, dependent upon the specific physical demands of competition. Events are given a code, made of numbers and letters, describing the type of event and classification of the athletes competing. Some sports, such as athletics, divide athletes by both the category and severity of their disabilities, other sports, for example swimming, group competitors from different categories together, the only separation being based on the severity of the disability.

== Swimming ==
Ukrainian-born Vladyslava Kravchenko, paralysed due to a spinal cord injury she sustained from a lighting structure falling on her at a September 2008 party in Qawra, was the sole para-athlete to represent Malta at the Rio Paralympic Games and was the first woman to represent the country in the quadrennial event since the 1980 Arnhem Paralympics. She was 25 years old at the time of the Games. She joined the Maltese Paralympic team in January 2013, and made an arrangement that enabled her to train for the Games while continuing to work as a chartered accountant for PricewaterhouseCoopers Malta.

Kravchenko was drawn in the second heat of the women's 50 metre butterfly S5 on 10 September, failing to progress into the final as her time of one minutes and 18.68 seconds placed her seventh in her heat and last overall. She was 27.12 seconds slower than the slowest competitor who reached the final. She similarly did not advance into the final of the women's 100 metre breaststroke SB4 held the following day because her time of three minutes and 21.16 seconds placed her thirteenth (and last) overall. The final swimming competition Kravchenko took part in was the women's 50 metre backstroke S5 on 16 September. She again failed to advance into the final after her time of one minute and 3.12 seconds, placed her sixth (and last overall) in the second heat and was 12.19 seconds slower than the slowest swimmer who progressed to the later stages.

Women

Athlete	Events	Heats		Final	
Athlete	Events	Time	Rank	Time	Rank
Vladyslava Kravchenko	50 m backstroke S5	1:03.12	11	did not advance	
Vladyslava Kravchenko	100 m breaststroke SB4	3:21.16	13	did not advance	
Vladyslava Kravchenko	50 m butterfly S5	1:18.68	13	did not advance	

== See also ==
- Malta at the 2016 Summer Olympics
