= Great Britain at the 1976 Summer Paralympics =

- Flag of the United Kingdom
- IPC code: GBR
- NPC: British Paralympic Association
- Website: www.paralympics.org.uk

in Toronto
- Competitors: 87 in 12 sports
- Medals Ranked 5th: Gold 29 Silver 28 Bronze 37 Total 94

Summer Paralympics appearances (overview)
- 1960; 1964; 1968; 1972; 1976; 1980; 1984; 1988; 1992; 1996; 2000; 2004; 2008; 2012; 2016; 2020; 2024

Great Britain sent a delegation to compete at the 1976 Summer Paralympics in Toronto, Ontario, Canada. Its athletes finished fifth in the overall medal count.

== Medalists ==
Medal	Name	Sport	Event
Gold	G. Anslow; Nicky Biggs; Alan Corrie	Archery	Men's short metric team open
Gold	Derek Howie	Athletics	Men's 1500m walk B
Gold	A. West	Athletics	Men's pentathlon 1A
Gold	Barbara Howie	Athletics	Women's 60m 3
Gold	Hazel Terry	Athletics	Women's discus throw 5
Gold	Peter Pienerosa	Lawn bowls	Men's singles D
Gold	Michael Shelton	Lawn bowls	Men's singles wh
Gold	J. Anderson; Ron Miller	Lawn bowls	Men's pairs C
Gold	Kate Bonnett	Lawn bowls	Women's singles B
Gold	Tommy Taylor	Snooker	Men's A-C
Gold	Mike Kenny	Swimming	Men's 25m freestyle 1A
Gold	Mike Kenny	Swimming	Men's 25m backstroke 1A
Gold	Mike Kenny	Swimming	Men's 25m breaststroke 1A
Gold	D. Bonnar	Swimming	Men's 50m butterfly 5
Gold	James Muirhead	Swimming	Men's 100m butterfly A
Gold	James Muirhead	Swimming	Men's 400m individual medley A
Gold	S. Sherrill	Swimming	Women's 25m freestyle 1A
Gold	Monica Vaughan	Swimming	Women's 100m freestyle D
Gold	S. Sherrill	Swimming	Women's 25m backstroke 1A
Gold	Monica Vaughan	Swimming	Women's 100m backstroke D
Gold	Monica Vaughan	Swimming	Women's 100m breaststroke D
Gold	Monica Vaughan	Swimming	Women's 100m butterfly D
Gold	Monica Vaughan	Swimming	Women's 200m individual medley D
Gold	Stephen Bradshaw	Table tennis	Men's singles 1B
Gold	Stephen Bradshaw; Tommy Taylor	Table tennis	Men's doubles 1B
Gold	Jane Blackburn	Table tennis	Women's singles 1B
Gold	Terry Willett	Wheelchair fencing	Men's épée individual 2-3
Gold	Cyril Thomas	Wheelchair fencing	Men's sabre individual 4-5
Gold	Janet Swann	Wheelchair fencing	Women's foil individual 2-3
Silver	L. Smith	Archery	Men's tetraplegic round A-C
Silver	M. Roberts	Athletics	Men's javelin throw F
Silver	Marie Harrower	Athletics	Women's discus throw A
Silver	Lynda Bethell	Athletics	Women's javelin throw B
Silver	Hazel Terry	Athletics	Women's shot put 5
Silver	Hazel Terry	Athletics	Women's pentathlon 5
Silver	M. Cooper; Margaret Maughan	Dartchery	Women's pairs open
Silver	William McLeod	Lawn bowls	Men's singles A
Silver	G. Morgan	Lawn bowls	Men's singles B
Silver	John Gladman; Peter Pienerosa	Lawn bowls	Men's pairs D
Silver	Gill Matthews	Lawn bowls	Women's singles wh
Silver	Iris Baker; Kate Bonnett	Lawn bowls	Women's pairs B
Silver	Margaret Maughan; Irene Nowak	Lawn bowls	Women's pairs wh
Silver	Brian Faulkner	Snooker	Men's 2-5
Silver	A. West	Swimming	Men's 25m freestyle 1A
Silver	James Muirhead	Swimming	Men's 100m freestyle A
Silver	A. West	Swimming	Men's 25m backstroke 1A
Silver	James Muirhead	Swimming	Men's 100m backstroke A
Silver	D. Smith	Swimming	Women's 25m butterfly 4
Silver	D. Smith	Swimming	Women's 150m individual medley 4
Silver	Maggy Jones; Gill Matthews	Table tennis	Women's teams 2
Silver	Gwen Buck; Janet Swann	Table tennis	Women's teams 3
Silver	Men's volleyball team	Volleyball	Men's standing
Silver	R. Rowe	Weightlifting	Men's light heavyweight
Silver	Cyril Thomas	Wheelchair fencing	Men's épée individual 4-5
Silver	John Clark; Mike Kelly; Cyril Thomas; Terry Willett	Wheelchair fencing	Men's épée team 2-5
Silver	Mike Kelly	Wheelchair fencing	Men's sabre individual 2-3
Silver	Mike Kelly; Cyril Thomas; Terry Willett	Wheelchair fencing	Men's sabre team 2-5
Bronze	Mike James	Archery	Men's FITA round tetraplegic A-C
Bronze	Alan Corrie	Archery	Men's short metric round open
Bronze	Gill Matthews	Archery	Women's short metric round open
Bronze	Terry Rae	Athletics	Men's 100m 2
Bronze	Chris Ireland	Athletics	Men's pentathlon D
Bronze	Carol Bryant	Athletics	Women's 60m 4
Bronze	Lynda Bethell	Athletics	Women's 100m B
Bronze	Lynda Bethell	Athletics	Women's discus throw B
Bronze	Marie Harrower	Athletics	Women's shot put A
Bronze	Jane Blackburn	Athletics	Women's pentathlon 1B
Bronze	Dawn Jackson	Athletics	Women's pentathlon 2
Bronze	Ron Miller	Lawn bowls	Men's singles C
Bronze	Michael McCreadie	Lawn bowls	Men's singles wh
Bronze	David Avis; Michael McCreadie	Lawn bowls	Men's pairs wh
Bronze	Iris Baker	Lawn bowls	Women's singles B
Bronze	Gwen Buck	Lawn bowls	Women's singles wh
Bronze	Gwen Buck; Gill Matthews	Lawn bowls	Women's pairs wh
Bronze	Michael Shelton	Snooker	Men's 2-5
Bronze	Peter Haslam	Snooker	Men's A-C
Bronze	B. Brooks	Swimming	Men's 25m backstroke 1C
Bronze	B. Speedy	Swimming	Men's 50m backstroke E
Bronze	B. Brooks	Swimming	Men's 25m breaststroke 1C
Bronze	D. Smith	Swimming	Women's 50m freestyle 4
Bronze	D. Smith	Swimming	Women's 50m backstroke 4
Bronze	Jenny Orpwood	Swimming	Women's 50m breaststroke 4
Bronze	B. Speedy	Table tennis	Men's singles E
Bronze	Billy Leake; Derek Williams	Table tennis	Men's teams 2
Bronze	Neil McDonald; Derek Riches	Table tennis	Men's teams 4-5
Bronze	Gill Matthews	Table tennis	Women's singles 2
Bronze	Janet Swann	Table tennis	Women's singles 3
Bronze	Carol Bryant	Table tennis	Women's singles 4-5
Bronze	John Clark	Wheelchair fencing	Men's épée individual 4-5
Bronze	Vincent Ross	Wheelchair fencing	Men's foil individual 2-3
Bronze	Howard Wardle	Wheelchair fencing	Men's foil novice individual
Bronze	Terry Willett	Wheelchair fencing	Men's sabre individual 2-3
Bronze	Carol Bryant	Wheelchair fencing	Women's foil individual 4-5
Bronze	Valerie Robertson; Janet Swann; Phyllis Waller	Wheelchair fencing	Women's foil novice team

=== Medals by sport ===
Medals by sport
Sport	Gold medal	Silver medal	Bronze medal	Total
Swimming	13	6	6	25
Lawn Bowls	4	6	6	16
Athletics	4	5	8	17
Wheelchair Fencing	3	4	6	13
Table tennis	3	2	6	11
Archery	1	1	3	5
Snooker	1	1	2	4
Dartchery	0	1	0	1
Weightlifting	0	1	0	1
Volleyball	0	1	0	1
Total	29	28	37	94

== See also ==
- Great Britain at the Paralympics
- Great Britain at the 1976 Summer Olympics
