= Malta at the 1980 Summer Paralympics =

- IPC code: MLT
- NPC: Malta Paralympic Committee
- Website: www.paralympic.mt

in Arnhem
- Competitors: 7 in 2 sports
- Medals: Gold 0 Silver 0 Bronze 1 Total 1

Summer Paralympics appearances (overview)
- 1960; 1964; 1968; 1972; 1976; 1980; 1984; 1988–2004; 2008; 2012; 2016; 2020; 2024

Malta participated in the 1980 Summer Paralympics in Arnhem, thus returning to the Games after being absent (for the first time) in 1976. The country sent seven representatives (four men and three women) to compete in athletics and lawn bowls.

C. Camilleri and L. Sammut, in the women's pairs in lawn bowls, won Malta's first Paralympic medal since 1964 - a bronze. It is also Malta's most recent Paralympic medal to date (2016).

== Medallists ==
Medal	Name	Sport	Event	Result
Bronze	C. Camilleri & L. Sammut	Lawn bowls	Women's pairs 2-5	semifinal: 9:13 loss to Margaret Maughan & R. Thompson of GBR

== See also ==
- Malta at the 1980 Summer Olympics
