= Athletics at the 1976 Summer Paralympics – Women's 100 metres B =

Women's 100 metres B at the V Paralympic Games
- Paralympic Athletics
- Competitors: 8 from 6 nations

Medalists
| 1st place, gold medalist(s) | | R. Laengen | Norway |
| 2nd place, silver medalist(s) | | Yasuko Takeuchi | Japan |
| 3rd place, bronze medalist(s) | | L. Bethel | Great Britain |

The Women's 100 metres B was a sprinting event in athletics at the 1976 Summer Paralympics in Toronto for blind athletes. (Visually impaired athletes may also have been permitted to take part; the specifics are unclear from the International Paralympic Committee's records.) It was the first time that sprinting events had taken place for athletes other than wheelchair athletes.

Eight athletes from six nations competed in the heats, and the top six advanced to the final. Poland's Bozena Kwiatkowska, who ran fastest in the heats, withdrew before the final, leaving the second fastest qualifier R. Laengen, of Norway, to take gold.

== Results ==
=== Heats ===
| Place | Athlete | Time |
|---|---|---|
| 1 | Bozena Kwiatkowska (POL) | 14.2 Q |
| 2 | R. Laengen (NOR) | 14.9 Q |
| 3 | Yasuko Takeuchi (JPN) | 15.3 Q |
| 4 | L. Lahey (CAN) | 15.8 Q |
| 5 | L. Lex (USA) | 16.1 Q |
| 6 | L. Bethel (GBR) | 16.4 Q |
| 7 | L. Baillargeon (CAN) | 16.6 |
| 8 | Simmons (CAN) | 17.3 |

=== Final ===
| Place | Athlete | Time |
|---|---|---|
| 1 | R. Laengen (NOR) | 14.4 |
| 2 | Yasuko Takeuchi (JPN) | 14.9 |
| 3 | L. Bethel (GBR) | 15.2 |
| 4 | L. Lex (USA) | 15.6 |
| 5 | L. Lahey (CAN) | 15.7 |
| - | Bozena Kwiatkowska (POL) | dns |
