= Barbara Anderson (athlete) =

British Paralympic multi-discipline athlete

Sport
- Country: United Kingdom
- Sport: Paralympic swimming, Archery, Athletics, Table tennis
Medal record
Paralympic Games
Swimming
| Gold medal – first place | 1960 Rome | Women's 25 m Backstroke class 1 |
| Gold medal – first place | 1960 Rome | Women's 25 m Breaststroke incomplete class 1 |
| Gold medal – first place | 1960 Rome | Women's 25 m Crawl incomplete class 1 |
Table Tennis
| Gold medal – first place | 1960 Rome | Women's Singles A |
| Gold medal – first place | 1972 Heidelberg | Women's Doubles 1A-1B |
Archery
| Silver medal – second place | 1972 Heidelberg | Mixed St. Nicholas Round Team tetraplegic |
| Silver medal – second place | 1972 Heidelberg | Women's St. Nicholas Round tetraplegic |

Barbara Anderson is a British athlete who won five gold medals at the Paralympic Games. A multi-discipline athlete, Anderson found particular success in class 1 swimming events in which she won three of her gold medals. Her other two gold medals came in table tennis both as an individual and with Jane Blackburn in the women's doubles. Anderson won a silver in the Mixed St. Nicholas Round Team tetraplegic archery event alongside Blackburn and Tommy Taylor as well as a silver in the individual event.

Anderson also represented Scotland at the 1970 and 1974 Commonwealth Paraplegic Games.
