= Teresa Mullen =

Irish paralympic athlete

- Born: Teresa Kelly; 27 April 1938; Dublin, Ireland
- Died: 23 August 1989 (aged 51)

Teresa Mullen (27 April 1938 – 23 August 1989) was an Irish paralympic athlete.

== Biography ==
Teresa Mullen was born in Dublin on 27 April 1938. She was the daughter of James Kelly and Lily Kelly (née Boles) of Ellenfield Road, Whitehall, Dublin. She attended school in Dublin, and worked as a machinist. In 1961 she married Christopher John Mullen. The couple had one son and two daughters. They first lived in North Strand and then moved to Coolock, Dublin.

Mullen was in her mid thirties when she began using a wheelchair following complications resulting from an epidural. She started attending the Clontarf day centre of the Irish Wheelchair Association in the mid 1980s, where she was introduced to lawn bowls, for which she proved to have a natural aptitude. She won the national special bowls novice title in 1985, winning the Irish senior titles in 1986 and 1987, making her the first bowler from the Republic of Ireland to do so. She took part in the Stoke Mandeville Games in 1986 and 1987, winning bronze in the singles and doubles events. She trained in Northern Ireland in preparation for the 1988 Paralympic Games in Seoul, Korea, training against and often defeating top able-bodied players.

Just before the 1988 games, Mullen was diagnosed with terminal cancer. Mullen travelled to Korea against the advice of her doctors, but supported by her family and medical supervision provided by the Paralympic Council of Ireland. Mullen spent a lot of time in bed during the games, only leaving to compete. Despite this, she won the gold medal in the Women's Bowls Singles category. She died at home in Coolock on 23 August 1989, and is buried Fingal cemetery, Balgriffin.
