= Paralympic sports =

Type of sport with events contested at the Paralympic Games

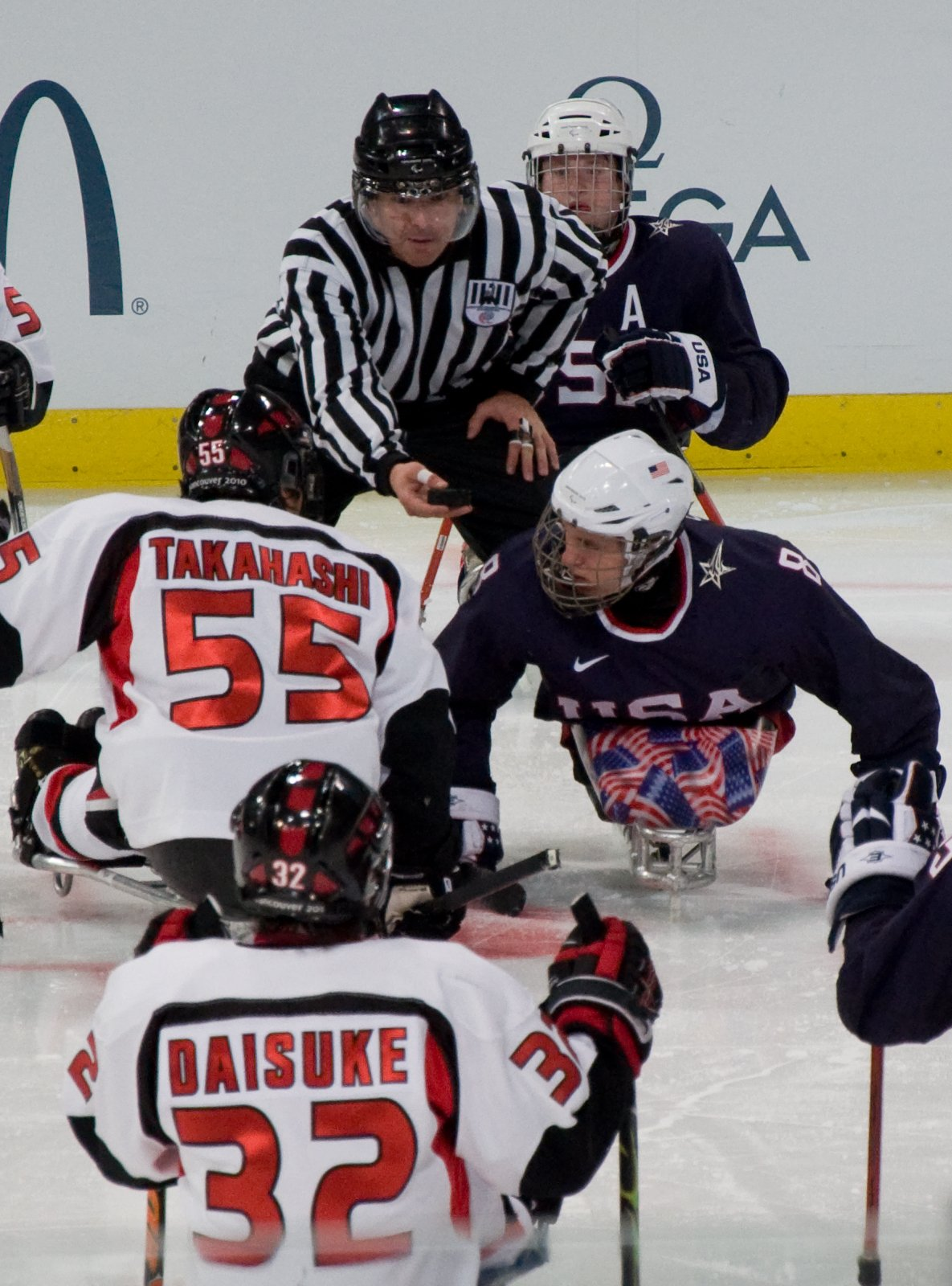
Ice Sledge Hockey: United States (blue shirts) vs Japan (white shirts) during the 2010 Paralympics in Vancouver.

The Paralympic sports comprise all the sports contested in the Summer and Winter Paralympic Games. The 2028 Summer Paralympics will include 23 sports and 560 medal events, and the 2026 Winter Paralympics included 6 sports and 79 events. The number and kinds of events may change from one Paralympic Games to another.

The Paralympic Games are a major international multi-sport event for athletes with physical disabilities or intellectual impairments. This includes athletes with mobility disabilities, amputations, blindness, and cerebral palsy. Paralympic sports refers to organised competitive sporting activities as part of the global Paralympic movement. These sports are organised and run under the supervision of the International Paralympic Committee and other international sports federations.

== History ==
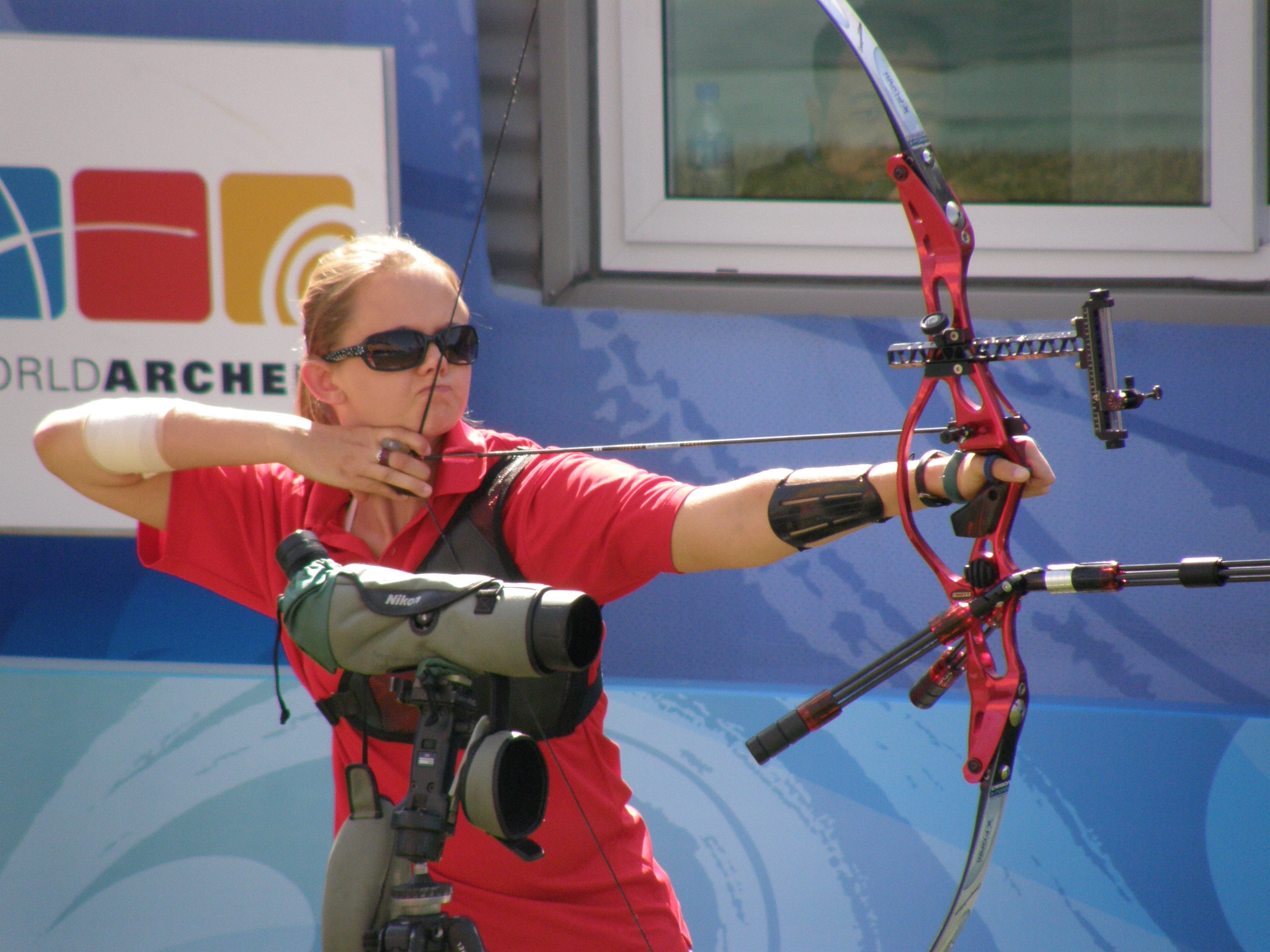
Archery: Lindsey Carmichael from the United States, at the 2008 Paralympic Games in Beijing.

Organised sport for persons with physical disabilities developed out of rehabilitation programs. Following World War II, in response to the needs of large numbers of injured ex-service members and civilians, sport was introduced as a key part of rehabilitation. Sport for rehabilitation grew into recreational sport and then into competitive sport. The pioneer of this approach was Ludwig Guttmann of the Stoke Mandeville Hospital in England. In 1948, while the Olympic Games were being held in London, England, he organised a sports competition for wheelchair athletes at Stoke Mandeville. This was the origin of the Stoke Mandeville Games, which evolved into the modern Paralympic Games.

== Organisation ==
The Paralympic symbol

Globally, the International Paralympic Committee is recognized as the leading organisation, with direct governance of five sports, and responsibility over the Paralympic Games and other multi-sport, multi-disability events. Other international organisations, notably, the International Blind Sports Federation (IBSA), Virtus Sport (formerly International Sports Federation for Persons with Intellectual Disability) and World Abilitysport (formed in 2023 from a merger between the International Wheelchair and Amputee Sports Federation and the Cerebral Palsy International Sports and Recreation Association) govern some sports that are specific to certain disability groups. In addition, certain single-sport federations govern sports for athletes with a disability, either as part of an able-bodied sports federation such as the International Federation for Equestrian Sports (FEI), or as a disabled sports federation such as the International Wheelchair Basketball Federation.

At the national level, there are a wide range of organisations that take responsibility for Paralympic sport, including National Paralympic Committees, which are members of the IPC, and many others.

== Disability categories ==
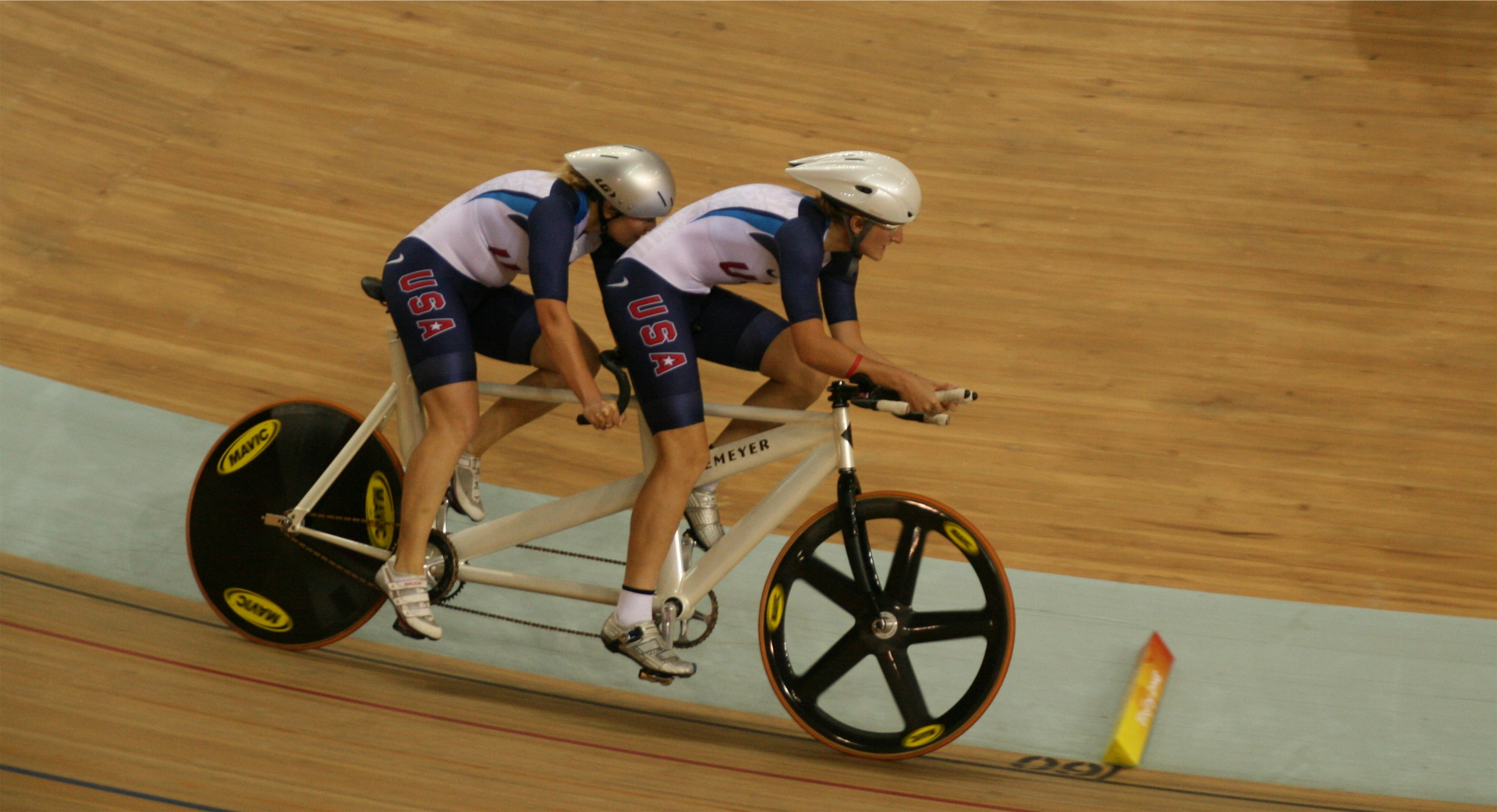
Cycling: Karissa Whitsell and Mackenzie Woodring (pilot) from the United States, compete in Beijing 2008

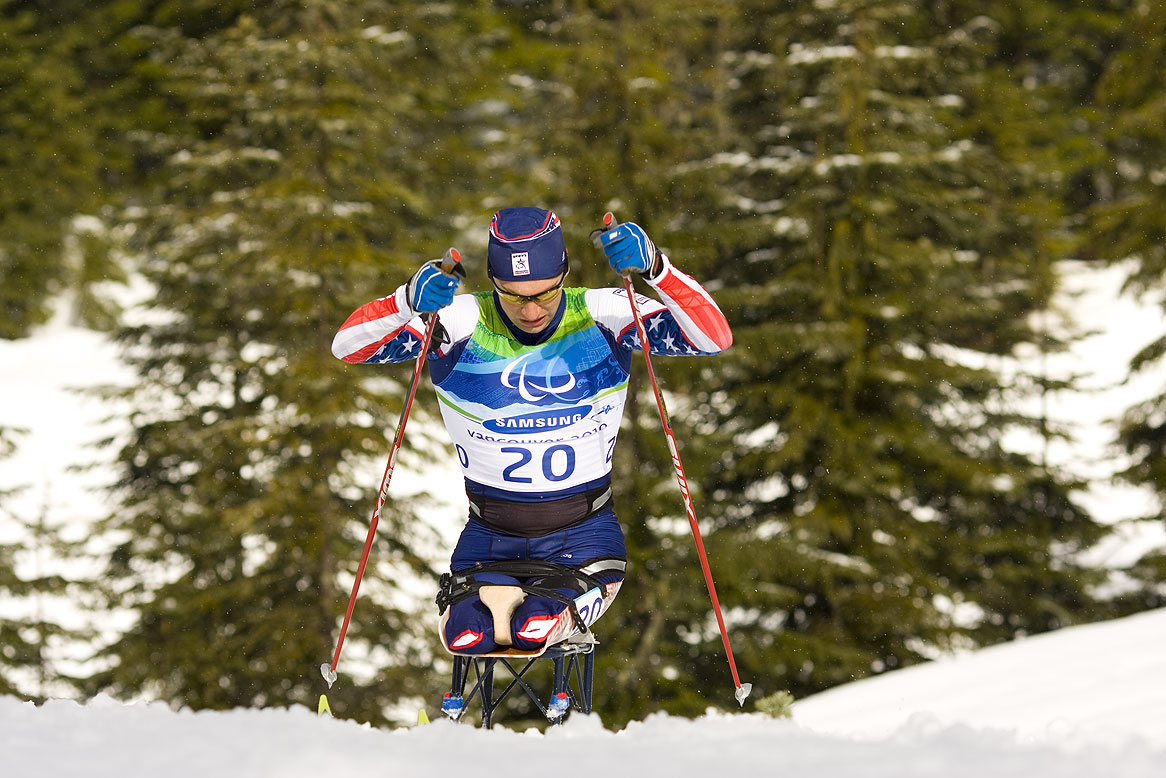
Biathlon: Andy Soule from the United States, at the 2010 Paralympics in Vancouver.

Athletes who participate in Paralympic sport are grouped into ten major categories, based on their type of disability:

Physical Impairment - There are eight different types of physical impairment recognised by the movement:

- Impaired muscle power - With impairments in this category, the force generated by muscles, such as the muscles of one limb, one side of the body or the lower half of the body is reduced, e.g. due to spinal-cord injury, spina bifida or polio.
- Impaired passive range of movement - Range of movement in one or more joints is reduced in a systematic way. Acute conditions such as arthritis are not included.
- Loss of limb or limb deficiency - A total or partial absence of bones or joints from partial or total loss due to illness, trauma, or congenital limb deficiency (e.g. dysmelia).
- Leg-length difference - Significant bone shortening occurs in one leg due to congenital deficiency or trauma.
- Short stature - Standing height is reduced due to shortened legs, arms and trunk, which are due to a musculoskeletal deficit of bone or cartilage structures.
- Hypertonia - Hypertonia is marked by an abnormal increase in muscle tension and reduced ability of a muscle to stretch. Hypertonia may result from injury, disease, or conditions which involve damage to the central nervous system (e.g. cerebral palsy).
- Ataxia - Ataxia is an impairment that consists of a lack of coordination of muscle movements (e.g. cerebral palsy, Friedreich's ataxia).
- Athetosis - Athetosis is generally characterised by unbalanced, involuntary movements and a difficulty maintaining a symmetrical posture (e.g. cerebral palsy, choreoathetosis).

Visual Impairment - Athletes with visual impairment ranging from partial vision, sufficient to be judged legally blind, to total blindness. This includes impairment of one or more component of the visual system (eye structure, receptors, optic nerve pathway, and visual cortex). The sighted guides for athletes with a visual impairment are such a close and essential part of the competition that the athlete with visual impairment and the guide are considered a team. Beginning in 2012, these guides (along with sighted goalkeepers in blind football became eligible to receive medals of their own.

Intellectual Disability - Athletes with a significant impairment in intellectual functioning and associated limitations in adaptive behaviour. The IPC primarily serves athletes with physical disabilities, but the disability group Intellectual Disability has been added to some Paralympic Games. This includes only elite athletes with intellectual disabilities diagnosed before the age of 18. However, the IOC-recognised Special Olympics World Games are open to all people with intellectual disabilities.

The disability category determines who athletes compete against and which sports they participate in. Some sports are open to multiple disability categories (e.g. cycling), while others are restricted to only one (e.g. judo). In some sports athletes from multiple categories compete, but only within their category (e.g. athletics), while in others athletes from different categories compete against one another (e.g. swimming). Events in the Paralympics are commonly labelled with the relevant disability category, such as Men's Swimming Freestyle S1, indicating athletes with a severe physical impairment, or Ladies Table Tennis 11, indicating athletes with an intellectual disability.

== Classification ==
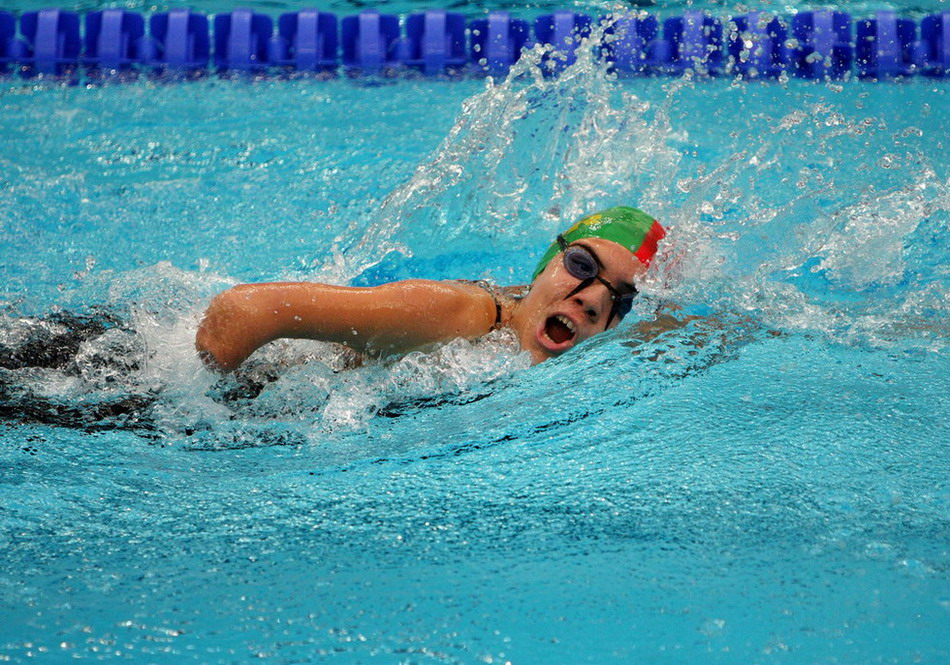
Swimming at the 2008 Summer Paralympics

A major component of Paralympic sport is classification. Classification provides a structure for competition which allows athletes to compete against others with similar disabilities or similar levels of physical function. It is similar in aim to the weight classes or age categories used in some non-disabled sports.

Athletes are classified through a variety of processes that depend on their disability group and the sport they are participating in. Evaluation may include a physical or medical examination, a technical evaluation of how the athlete performs certain sport-related physical functions, and observation in and out of competition. Each sport has its own specific classification system which factors into the rules for Paralympic competition in the sport.

== Summer Paralympics ==
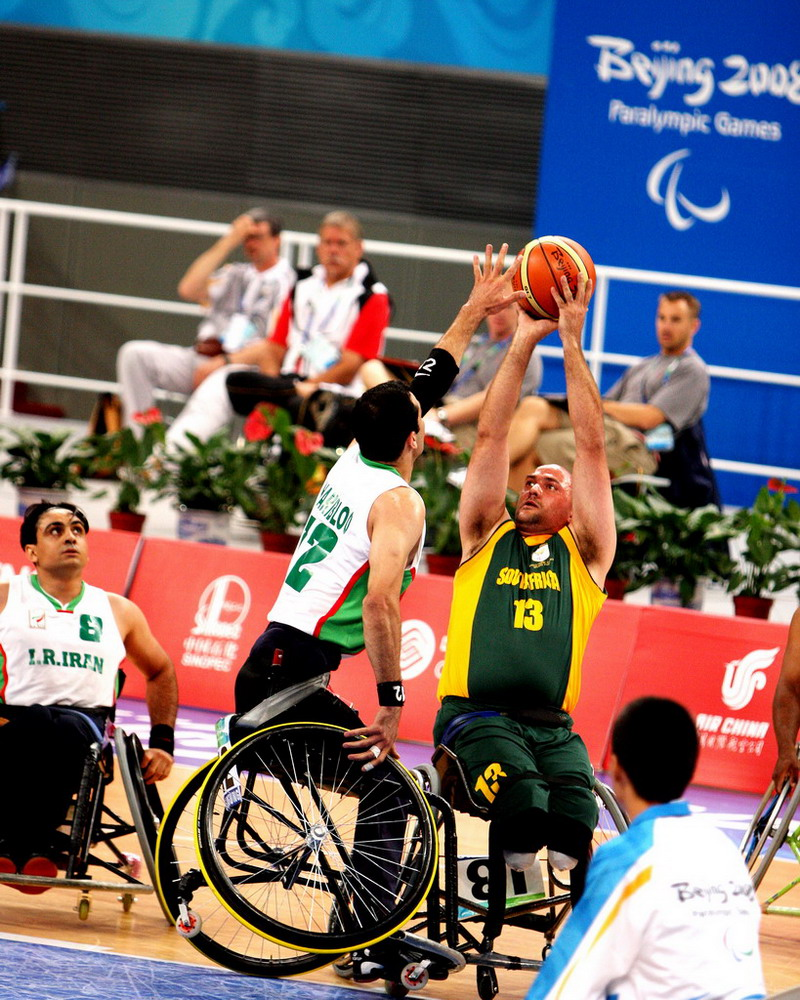
Wheelchair basketball: Iran vs South Africa at the 2008 Summer Paralympics.

Sport		Eligible impairments			Governing body	Paralympic Games status	By years																		
Sport		Physical	Visual	Intellectual	Governing body	Paralympic Games status	60	64	68	72	76	80	84	88	92	96	00	04	08	12	16	20	24	28	32
Current summer sports
Archery		Yes			WA	Summer sport (since 1960)	8	12	13	12	18	15	18	9	7	8	7	7	9	9	9	9	9	9	
Athletics		Yes	Yes	Yes	IPC	Summer sport (since 1960)	25	42	70	73	208	274	443	333	240	211	226	194	160	170	177	168	164	164	
Badminton		Yes	Yes	Yes	BWF	Summer sport (since 2020)																14	16	16	
Blind football			Yes		IBSA	Summer sport (since 2004)												1	1	1	1	1	1	1	
Boccia		Yes			World Boccia	Summer sport (since 1984)							5	3	3	5	5	7	7	7	7	7	11	11	
Canoe		Yes			ICF	Summer sport (since 2016)															6	9	10	10	
Climbing		Yes	Yes		WC	Summer sport (to be added in 2028)																		8	
Cycling:	Track cycling	Yes	Yes		UCI	Summer sport (since 1996)										11	15	16	21	18	17	17	17	17	
Cycling:	Road cycling	Yes	Yes		UCI	Summer sport (since 1984)							7	7	9	12	12	15	23	32	33	34	34	34	
Equestrian		Yes	Yes		FEI	Summer sport (since 1996)							12			9	9	9	11	11	11	11	11	11	
Fencing		Yes			World Abilitysport	Summer sport (since 1960)	3	7	10	11	14	17	15	14	14	15	15	15	10	12	14	16	16	16	
Goalball			Yes		IBSA	Summer sport (since 1976)					1	1	2	2	2	2	2	2	2	2	2	2	2	2	
Judo			Yes		IBSA	Summer sport (since 1988)								6	7	7	7	13	13	13	13	13	16	16	
Powerlifting		Yes			IPC	Summer sport (since 1984)							7	9	10	10	20	20	20	20	20	20	20	20	
Rowing		Yes	Yes		FISA	Summer sport (since 2008)													4	4	4	4	5	5	
Shooting		Yes	Yes		IPC	Summer sport (since 1976)					3	11	29	23	16	15	12	12	12	12	12	13	13	13	
Swimming		Yes	Yes	Yes	IPC	Summer sport (since 1960)	69	63	68	56	146	193	347	257	199	169	170	167	141	148	153	146	141	142	
Table tennis		Yes		Yes	ITTF	Summer sport (since 1960)	11	12	15	19	27	31	39	37	30	28	30	28	24	29	29	31	31	32	
Taekwondo		Yes	Yes	Yes	WT	Summer sport (since 2020)																6	10	10	
Triathlon		Yes	Yes		TRI	Summer sport (since 2016)															6	8	11	12	
Volleyball		Yes			WPV	Summer sport (since 1976)					2	2	2	2	2	2	2	2	2	2	2	2	2	2	
Wheelchair basketball		Yes			IWBF	Summer sport (since 1960)	2	2	2	2	2	2	2	2	2	2	2	2	2	2	2	2	2	2	
Wheelchair rugby		Yes			WWR	Summer sport (since 2000)											1	1	1	1	1	1	1	1	
Wheelchair tennis		Yes			World Tennis	Summer sport (since 1992)									4	4	4	6	6	6	6	6	6	6	
Discontinued summer sports
Basketball ID				Yes	INAS-FID	Summer sport (2000)											1								
Dartchery		Yes			IPC	Summer sport (1960–1980)	3	3	3	3	3	3													
Football 7-a-side		Yes			CP-ISRA	Summer sport (1984–2016)							2	1	1	1	1	1	1	1	1				
Lawn bowls		Yes	Yes		IPC	Summer sport (1968–1988, 1996)			4	4	16	19	11	6		8									
Sailing		Yes	Yes		IFDS	Summer sport (2000–2016)											2	2	3	3	3				
Snooker		Yes			IWAS	Summer sport (1960–1976, 1984–1988)	1	1	1	2	2		2	1											
Weightlifting		Yes			IPC	Summer sport (1964–1992)		4	4	6	6	11	15	7	5										
Wrestling			Yes			Summer sport (1980–1984)						10	9												

=== Future summer sports ===
On June 12, 2024, the organising committee for the 2028 Summer Paralympics in Los Angeles, announced they would propose Paraclimbing (a variation on sport climbing, which has been an Olympic sport since 2020). The IPC executive voted to approve the proposal during a meeting on June 26, 2024.

== Winter Paralympics ==
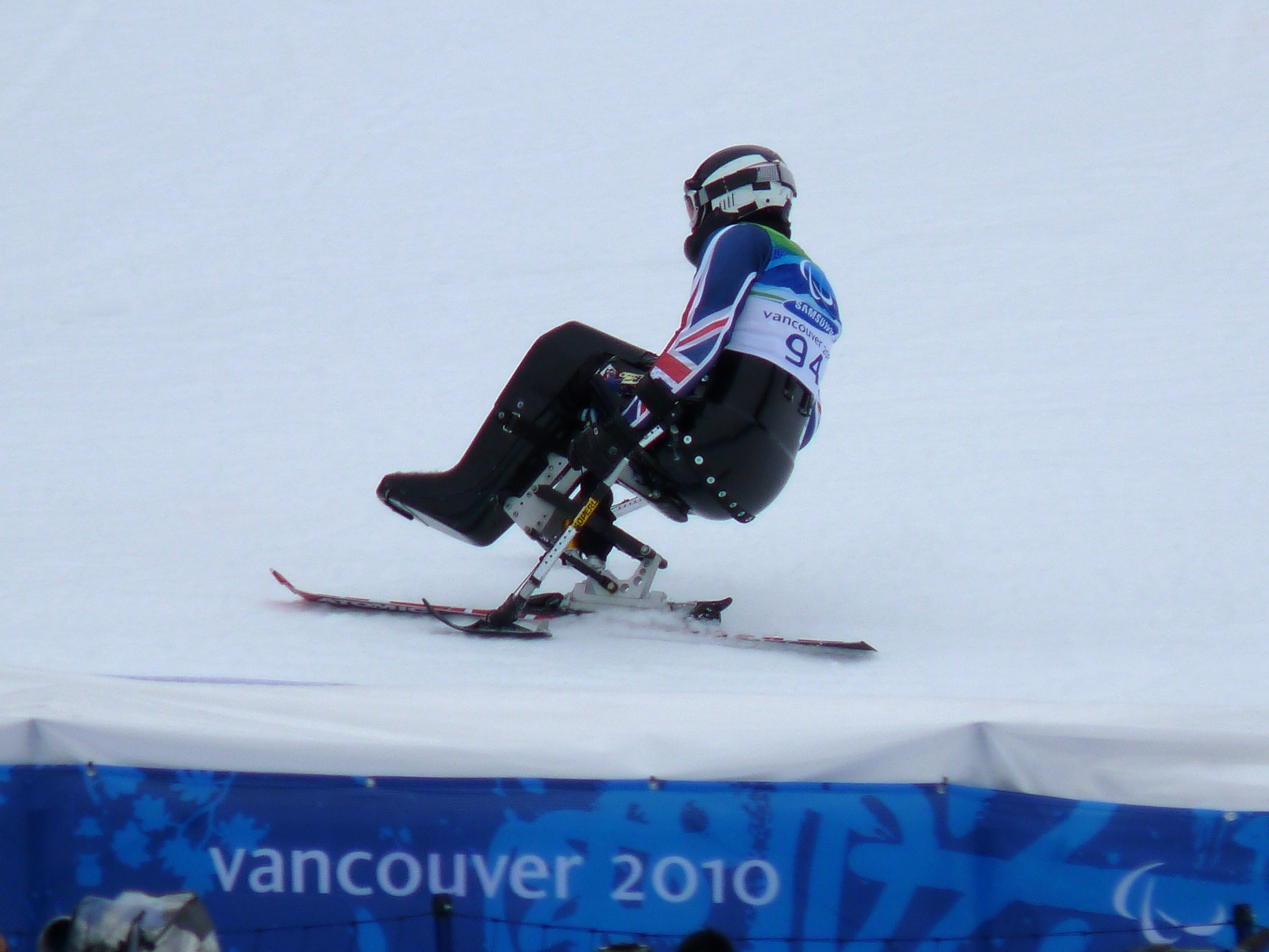
Alpine skiing: Talan Skeels-Piggins from Great Britain at the Winter Paralympics 2010 in Vancouver.

Sport	Eligible impairments			Governing body	Paralympic Games status	By years														
Sport	Physical	Visual	Intellectual	Governing body	Paralympic Games status	1976	80	84	88	92	94	98	2002	06	10	14	18	22	26	30
Current winter sports
Alpine skiing	Yes	Yes	Yes	FIS	Winter sport (since 1976)	28	22	56	43	48	66	54	53	24	30	30	30	30	30	
Biathlon	Yes	Yes		IBU	Winter sport (since 1988)				3	4	10	12	6	12	12	18	18	18	18	
Cross-country skiing	Yes	Yes		FIS	Winter sport (since 1976)	25	27	35	38	27	48	39	32	20	20	20	20	20	20	
Ice hockey	Yes			IPC	Winter sport (since 1994)							1	1	1	1	1	1	1	1	
Snowboard	Yes			FIS	Winter sport (since 2014)											2	10	8	8	
Wheelchair curling	Yes			World Curling	Winter sport (since 2006)								1	1	1	1	1	1	2	
Discontinued winter sports
Ice sledge racing	Yes				Winter Sport (1980–1988, 1994–1998)		14	16	12		8	16								

=== Possible future winter sports ===
Bob Balk, the chairman of the International Paralympic Committee (IPC) Athletes' Council, launched a campaign in early 2012 to have sliding sports (bobsleigh, luge and skeleton) included at the 2018 Winter Paralympics in Pyeongchang, South Korea.

At the meeting in Madrid, Spain, on 10 and 11 September 2018, the IPC executive board announced that Para Bobsleigh had failed in some evaluation criteria and would not be part of the official program for the 2022 Winter Paralympic Games.

== Abbreviations ==
- Governing bodies:
  - BWF — Badminton World Federation
  - CP-ISRA — Cerebral Palsy International Sports and Recreation Association
  - IFDS — International Association for Disabled Sailing
  - IBSA — International Blind Sports Federation (including Blind football, Goalball, Para judo)
  - ICF — International Canoe Federation
  - UCI — International Cycling Union
  - FEI — International Federation for Equestrian Sports
  - IPC — International Paralympic Committee (including Para athletics, Para ice hockey, Para powerlifting, Para swimming, shooting Para sport)
  - FIS — International Ski and Snowboard Federation
  - INAS-FID — International Sports Federation for Persons with an Intellectual Disability
  - ITTF — International Table Tennis Federation
  - IWAS — International Wheelchair and Amputee Sport Federation
  - IWBF — International Wheelchair Basketball Federation
  - — Virtus Sport
  - — World Abilitysport (including Para fencing)
  - WA — World Archery
  - — World Boccia
  - WC — World Climbing
  - — World Curling
  - WPV — World ParaVolley
  - FISA — World Rowing Federation
  - — World Tennis
  - TRI — World Triathlon
  - WWR — World Wheelchair Rugby

== Notes ==
The categories listed represent all those groups that participate in this sport at some level. Not all these categories may be represented in competition at the Paralympic Games.

The governing bodies listed represent those organisations responsible for the broadest level of participation. In some cases, other disability-specific organisations will also have some governance of athletes in that sport within their own group. For example, the IPC governs multi-disability athletics competitions such as the Paralympic Games; however, CP-ISRA, IBSA, and IWAS have provided single-disability events in athletics for athletes with cerebral palsy, visually impaired athletes, and wheelchair and amputee athletes respectively.

Paralympic Games status details the years these sports were practised as full medal events at the Paralympic Games.

== See also ==
- Olympic sports
