= Swimming at the 2016 Summer Paralympics – Women's 100 metre breaststroke SB4 =

Women's 100 metre breaststroke SB4 at the XV Paralympic Games
- Venue: Olympic Aquatics Stadium
- Dates: 11 September 2016
- Competitors: 13 from 11 nations

Medalists
1st place, gold medalist(s)		Sarah Louise Rung	Norway
2nd place, silver medalist(s)		Giulia Ghiretti	Italy
3rd place, bronze medalist(s)		Rui Si Theresa Goh	Singapore

The women's 100 metre breaststroke SB4 event at the 2016 Paralympic Games took place on 11 September 2016, at the Olympic Aquatics Stadium. Two heats were held. The swimmers with the eight fastest times advanced to the final.

== Heats ==
=== Heat 1 ===
11:27 11 September 2016:

Rank	Lane	Name	Nationality	Time	Notes
1	4	Giulia Ghiretti	Italy	1:55.58	Q
2	3	Inbal Pezaro	Israel	1:57.28	Q
3	5	Natallia Shavel	Belarus	2:02.11	Q
4	2	Qi Wu	China	2:11.18	
5	6	Mayumi Narita	Japan	2:11.33	
6	7	Nataliia Shestopal	Ukraine	2:22.22	

=== Heat 2 ===
11:33 11 September 2016:

Rank	Lane	Name	Nationality	Time	Notes
1	4	Sarah Louise Rung	Norway	1:45.46	Q
2	5	Rui Si Theresa Goh	Singapore	1:54.50	Q
3	3	Li Zhang	China	2:02.84	Q
4	2	Cuan Yao	China	2:05.00	Q
5	6	Chrysoula Antoniadou	Greece	2:06.92	Q
6	7	Katalin Engelhardt	Hungary	2:22.16	
7	1	Vladyslava Kravchenko	Malta	3:21.16	

== Final ==
20:04 11 September 2016:

Rank	Lane	Name	Nationality	Time	Notes
1st place, gold medalist(s)	4	Sarah Louise Rung	Norway	1:44.94	
2nd place, silver medalist(s)	3	Giulia Ghiretti	Italy	1:50.58	
3rd place, bronze medalist(s)	5	Rui Si Theresa Goh	Singapore	1:55.55	
4	7	Li Zhang	China	1:58.13	
5	2	Natallia Shavel	Belarus	2:00.71	
6	6	Inbal Pezaro	Israel	2:01.02	
7	8	Chrysoula Antoniadou	Greece	2:06.24	
8	1	Cuan Yao	China	2:07.64	
