= John Davies (bowls) =

New Zealand Paralympian

Personal information
- Full name: John Davies

Sport
- Country: New Zealand
- Sport: Lawn bowls
Medal record
Lawn bowls
Representing New Zealand
Paralympic Games
Bronze medal – third place	1988 Seoul	Pairs LB2

John Davies is a New Zealand Paralympian who competed in lawn bowls. At the 1988 Summer Paralympics, he won a bronze medal in the pairs LB2 event.
