= Peter Horne (bowls) =

New Zealand Paralympic lawn bowler

Peter Horne MNZM
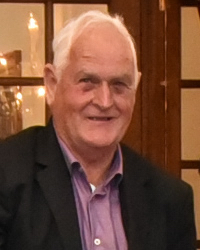
- Horne in 2020

Personal information
- Full name: Peter Ronald Horne

Sport
- Country: New Zealand
- Sport: Lawn bowls
Medal record
Lawn bowls
Representing New Zealand
Paralympic Games
Gold medal – first place	1988 Seoul	Singles LB3
Bronze medal – third place	1988 Seoul	Pairs LB2

Peter Ronald Horne MNZM is a New Zealand Paralympian who competed in lawn bowls. At the 1988 Summer Paralympics, he won a gold medal in the Singles LB3, and a bronze medal in the Pairs LB2. He also competed at the 1996 Summer Paralympics.

In the 2021 Queen's Birthday Honours, Horne was appointed a Member of the New Zealand Order of Merit, for services to bowls and Paralympic sport.
