= Malta at the Paralympics =

- IPC code: MLT
- NPC: Malta Paralympic Committee
- Website: www.paralympic.mt
- Medals: Gold 0 Silver 2 Bronze 5 Total 7

Summer appearances
- 1960; 1964; 1968; 1972; 1976; 1980; 1984; 1988–2004; 2008; 2012; 2016; 2020; 2024

Malta participated in the inaugural Paralympic Games in 1960 in Rome, sending four competitors to take part in athletics, snooker and table tennis. Its first participation was also its most successful; each of its representatives won a medal: two silver and two bronze. The country then competed in almost every edition of the Summer Paralympics up to 1984, included - being absent only at the 1976 Games. Maltese competitors won two bronze medals in 1964, and one more in 1980. Malta subsequently ceased to take part in the Paralympics, until it made its return in 2008, with a single representative, after missing five consecutive Summer Games.

Malta has never taken part in the Winter Paralympics.

In terms of size, Malta is the third smallest National Paralympic Committee to have competed at the Paralympic Games, behind Macau and Liechtenstein. With seven medals, it has been significantly more successful than either - Macau having never won a medal, and Liechtenstein only one.

== Medallists ==
Medal	Name	Games	Sport	Event	Result
Silver	Angela Scicluna	1960 Rome	Athletics	Women's shot put C	4.51
Silver	Moses Azopardi	1960 Rome	Table tennis	Men's singles C	2nd (specifics not recorded)
Bronze	C. Markham	1960 Rome	Athletics	Men's shot put B	7.03
Bronze	G. Portelli	1960 Rome	Snooker	Men's Snooker Event paraplegics - open	joint 3rd (specifics not recorded)
Bronze	C. Markham	1964 Tokyo	Snooker	Men's Snooker Event paraplegics - open	joint 3rd (specifics not recorded)
Bronze	G. Portelli	1964 Tokyo	Snooker	Men's Snooker Event paraplegics - open	joint 3rd (specifics not recorded)
Bronze	C. Camilleri & L. Sammut	1980 Arnhem	Lawn bowls	Women's pairs 2-5	semifinal: 9:13 loss to Margaret Maughan & R. Thompson of GBR

== See also ==
- Malta at the Olympics
