= Portsmouth Northsea Swimming Club =

British swimming club

Club information
- Short name: Portsmouth Northsea
- City: Portsmouth, Hampshire, United Kingdom
- Founded: c.1927
- Home pool(s): Mountbatten Leisure Centre

Portsmouth Northsea Swimming Club (PNSC) in Portsmouth, England, is the largest swimming club in South Hampshire. In recent years, the club has been well known for producing Olympic swimmers including Katy Sexton, MBE, and Gemma Spofforth, as well as Paralympic swimmer and triathlete, Lauren Steadman, OBE. Before pool closures during the COVID-19 pandemic, the club had 250 members between the ages 7 and 74, and offered 80 training sessions a week led by 10 swimming coaches, plus a strength and conditioning coach. Portsmouth Northsea SC uses four pools across the city, with Mountbatten Leisure Centre as its main base, and offers a Learn to Swim Programme, annual Club Championships, Open Meet competitions, and an Easter Swim Festival. PNSC used to compete in the Arena league but got demoted to the Rother league in the last couple of years due to lack of competitiveness.

== History ==
The club states that it was founded in 1927 and named after the Northsea Arms, a pub that has since closed, in Stamshaw. A 1933 article in the Portsmouth Evening News, however, traces the club's inception as far back as the summer of 1911, when the Stamshaw Swimming Pond first opened. In 1919, Superintendent George Byng called a meeting of his supporters to form a swimming club and resume aquatic activities, which had been on hiatus during World War I. Not wanting to call the club "Stamshaw", the committee eventually settled on the name Northsea Swimming Club rather than "Southsea", because of its location in the northern part of town. The Northsea Swimming Club subsequently formed a water polo team, which won a local competition in 1926. In 1927, Edwin A. Palmer became chairman of the club, with C. H. Webb as honorary secretary. In the first year under Palmer's leadership, club membership was expanded from 14 to 150, and by 1933, it had 516 members. At that time, the Northsea Swimming Club had one of the strongest junior sections in the county, and was known for its annual open water swimming race to the Isle of Wight.

Notable past coaches at Portsmouth Northsea SC have included international coach Chris Nesbit, who served as head coach for PNSC from 1980 to 2005. In 2009, PNSC moved from its home at the Victoria Swimming Baths to the new Mountbatten Leisure Centre, with a modern, 8-lane 50-metre swimming pool.

== Notable members ==
Over the years, Portsmouth Northsea SC has trained many British swimmers that have reached international competitions such as the Olympic and Paralympic Games, including:

- Monica Vaughan, who competed at the 1976 and 1980 Summer Paralympic Games, winning nine gold medals and one silver in swimming;
- Lauren Steadman, a long-time member of Portsmouth Northsea who also trains with the City of Portsmouth Athletics Club, and has competed in four Summer Paralympic Games – twice in swimming and twice in the triathlon – most recently winning a gold medal at the 2020 Tokyo Paralympics;
- Katy Sexton, who swam for Great Britain at the 2004 Summer Olympics; competed in three Commonwealth Games, winning a gold medal in the 200-metre backstroke in 1998; and became the first British swimmer to win a World Aquatics Championships title in 2003;
- Gemma Spofforth, who once held a world record in the 100-metre backstroke, winning a gold medal in the 2009 World Aquatics Championships, one of eight medals she won in international competitions;
- Grant Robins, team leader for England at the 2022 Commonwealth Games as well as the 2018 Commonwealth Games, who competed as a swimmer in the 1990 Games;
- Mike Goody, a former gunner for the Royal Air Force, who won four gold medals and one bronze at the 2016 Invictus Games for injured servicemen and women.
