= Lawn bowls at the Summer Paralympics =

- Events: 8 (men: 4; women: 4)

Games
- 1960; 1964; 1968; 1972; 1976; 1980; 1984; 1988; 1992; 1996; 2000; 2004; 2008; 2012; 2016; 2020; 2024
- Medalists

Lawn bowls has been contested at Summer Paralympics on six occasions, first appearing on the schedule in 1968 and having its most recent outing at the 1996 games. The competitions were initially divided by sex, with singles and doubles events for men and women. In 1976, divisions by disability category were introduced, greatly expanding the number of events and medals. Participation peaked at the 1976 edition, with 80 entrants from 13 countries competing in 16 events. Great Britain was the most successful nation in this sport at each of the games it was held.

== Summary ==
Edition	Year	Events	Nations	Athletes	Best nation
3rd	1968	4	8	31	Great Britain
4th	1972	4	7	20	Great Britain
5th	1976	16	13	80	Great Britain
6th	1980	19	13	69	Great Britain
7th	1984	11	8	52	Great Britain
8th	1988	6	10	55	Great Britain
10th	1996	8	11	64	Great Britain

=== Medal table ===
Rank	Nation	Gold	Silver	Bronze	Total
1	Great Britain (GBR)	35	29	20	84
2	Australia (AUS)	8	7	5	20
3	Ireland (IRL)	7	2	3	12
4	South Africa (RSA)	5	5	1	11
5	Canada (CAN)	4	1	2	7
6	United States (USA)	2	3	7	12
7	Japan (JPN)	2	2	1	5
8	Indonesia (INA)	2	1	5	8
9	France (FRA)	1	0	5	6
10	New Zealand (NZL)	1	0	1	2
11	West Germany (FRG)	1	0	0	1
12	Austria (AUT)	0	4	0	4
13	South Korea (KOR)	0	1	2	3
14	Hong Kong (HKG)	0	1	1	2
14	Zimbabwe (ZIM)	0	1	1	2
16	Brazil (BRA)	0	1	0	1
16	Egypt (EGY)	0	1	0	1
16	Kenya (KEN)	0	1	0	1
19	Israel (ISR)	0	0	2	2
19	Italy (ITA)	0	0	2	2
21	Malta (MLT)	0	0	1	1
Totals (21 entries)		68	60	59	187
