= Malta at the 1968 Summer Paralympics =

- IPC code: MLT
- NPC: Malta Paralympic Committee
- Website: www.paralympic.mt

in Tel Aviv
- Competitors: 6 in 2 sports
- Medals: Gold 0 Silver 0 Bronze 0 Total 0

Summer Paralympics appearances (overview)
- 1960; 1964; 1968; 1972; 1976; 1980; 1984; 1988–2004; 2008; 2012; 2016; 2020; 2024

Malta participated in the 1968 Summer Paralympics in Tel Aviv. The country sent six representatives (four men and two women) to compete in athletics and table tennis. For the first time, Maltese competitors failed to win a medal.

== See also ==
- Malta at the 1968 Summer Olympics
