= Monica Vaughan =

British Paralympic swimmer (born 1952)

Monica Vaughan OBE
Personal information
- Born: 15 April 1952 (age 74)

Sport
- Country: United Kingdom
- Sport: Paralympic swimming, volleyball
Medal record
Paralympic Games
Swimming
Gold medal – first place	1976 Toronto	Women's 100 m Freestyle D
Gold medal – first place	1976 Toronto	Women's 100 m Backstroke D
Gold medal – first place	1976 Toronto	Women's 100 m Breaststroke D
Gold medal – first place	1976 Toronto	Women's 100 m Butterfly D
Gold medal – first place	1976 Toronto	Women's 4x50 m Individual Medley D
Gold medal – first place	1980 Arnhem	Women's 100 m Freestyle C-D
Gold medal – first place	1980 Arnhem	Women's 100 m Breaststroke D
Gold medal – first place	1980 Arnhem	Women's 100 m Butterfly D
Gold medal – first place	1980 Arnhem	Women's 4x50 m Individual Medley D
Silver medal – second place	1980 Arnhem	Women's 100 m Backstroke C-D
Volleyball
Silver medal – second place	1976 Toronto	Men's Standing

Monica Vaughan (15 April 1952) is a retired British athlete and multiple gold medal-winning paralympic swimmer. She was Britain's most successful Paralympian at the 1976 Games in Toronto, winning five gold medals in swimming and a silver medal as the only woman in the British volleyball team. She returned for the 1980 Games in Arhnem, winning a further four gold medals and a silver.

== Early life ==
Vaughan grew up in Cosham, Hampshire. She had a leg amputated at the age of four, after she fell under a trolleybus. At primary school, she had swimming lessons every summer, but never learned to swim. The lessons started with the breaststroke, which was difficult to swim as a mid-thigh amputee. A science teacher at secondary school taught her the front crawl and within weeks she was able to swim.

Vaughan joined the local swimming club, Portsmouth Northsea SC. In 1966, Vaughan was disqualified from a butterfly race, because she didn't move her legs together and simultaneously. Northsea's protests against the lack of inclusion, lead to a meeting with the Amateur Swimming Association and a change of the rules. The news was covered in newspapers as far away as California and Singapore.

Vaughan worked as a podiatrist before retiring.

Vaughan was appointed Officer of the Order of the British Empire (OBE) in the 2025 Birthday Honours for services to sport.
