= Swimming at the 2016 Summer Paralympics – Women's 50 metre butterfly S5 =

Women's 50 metre butterfly S5 at the XV Paralympic Games
- Venue: Olympic Aquatics Stadium
- Dates: 10 September 2016
- Competitors: 13 from 12 nations

Medalists
1st place, gold medalist(s)		Xihan Xu	China
2nd place, silver medalist(s)		Sarah Louise Rung	Norway
3rd place, bronze medalist(s)		Giulia Ghiretti	Italy

The women's 50 metre butterfly S5 event at the 2016 Paralympic Games took place on 10 September 2016, at the Olympic Aquatics Stadium. Two heats were held. The swimmers with the eight fastest times advanced to the final.

== Heats ==
=== Heat 1 ===
10:11 10 September 2016:

Rank	Lane	Name	Nationality	Time	Notes
1	4	Xihan Xu	China	43.90	Q
2	5	Reka Kezdi	Hungary	46.13	Q
3	3	Joana Maria Silva	Brazil	51.56	Q
4	7	Haley Beranbaum	United States	52.54	
5	6	Katalin Engelhardt	Hungary	52.60	
6	2	Simone Fragoso	Portugal	56.23	

=== Heat 2 ===
10:15 10 September 2016:

Rank	Lane	Name	Nationality	Time	Notes
1	5	Teresa Perales	Spain	47.73	Q
2	6	Giulia Ghiretti	Italy	48.33	Q
3	3	Natallia Shavel	Belarus	49.78	Q
4	7	Sevilay Ozturk	Turkey	49.94	Q
5	4	Sarah Louise Rung	Norway	50.63	Q
6	2	Tammy Cunnington	Canada	53.67	PR
7	1	Vladyslava Kravchenko	Malta	1:18.68	

== Final ==
18:03 10 September 2016:

Rank	Lane	Name	Nationality	Time	Notes
1st place, gold medalist(s)	4	Xihan Xu	China	43.62	
2nd place, silver medalist(s)	1	Sarah Louise Rung	Norway	45.67	
3rd place, bronze medalist(s)	6	Giulia Ghiretti	Italy	45.74	
4	5	Reka Kezdi	Hungary	45.82	
5	3	Teresa Perales	Spain	47.36	
6	8	Joana Maria Silva	Brazil	47.51	
7	2	Natallia Shavel	Belarus	47.55	
8	7	Sevilay Ozturk	Turkey	50.89	
