= Archery at the 1960 Summer Paralympics – Women's Columbia round open =

Women's Columbia round open at the I Paralympic Games
- Paralympic Archery
- Competitors: 3 from 3 nations

Medalists
| 1st place, gold medalist(s) | | Margaret Maughan | Great Britain |
| 2nd place, silver medalist(s) | | Marc de Vos | Belgium |
| 3rd place, bronze medalist(s) | | Gubbin | Great Britain |

The Women's Columbia round open was one of the events held in archery at the 1960 Summer Paralympics in Rome.

There were only three competitors - representing Belgium and Great Britain. According to the International Paralympic Committee's records, the Belgian competitor was Marc de Vos. This is the name of a male Belgian track and field Paralympian from the early 1980s, and "Marc" is a male given name, so this may be an error in the IPC database.

Margaret Maughan of Great Britain was a clear winner with 484 points. The Belgian archer took silver with 437, while British archer Gubbin (full name not recorded) finished almost a hundred points behind her compatriot to take bronze.

| Rank | Athlete | Score |
|---|---|---|
| 1st place, gold medalist(s) | Margaret Maughan (GBR) | 484 |
| 2nd place, silver medalist(s) | Marc de Vos (BEL) | 437 |
| 3rd place, bronze medalist(s) | Gubbin (GBR) | 386 |
