= Lawn bowls at the 1980 Summer Paralympics – Women's pairs 2–5 =

Lawn bowls – Women's pairs 2–5 at the VI Paralympic Games
- Competitors: 3 from 2 nations

Medalists
1st place, gold medalist(s)		Margaret Maughan & R. Thompson	Great Britain
2nd place, silver medalist(s)		Yvonne Hawtin & G. Matthews	Great Britain
3rd place, bronze medalist(s)		C. Camilleri & L. Sammut	Malta

The women's pairs 2–5 was one of the events held in lawn bowls at the 1980 Summer Paralympics in Arnhem.

There were only three pairs of competitors. Hawtin and Matthews received a bye in the semi-finals, leaving Maughan and Thompson to face Camilleri and Sammut in the only disputed semi. The British pair defeated their Maltese opponents by 13:9. The final was thus an all-British event, where Maughan and Thompson defeated their compatriots with an unrecorded score.
