= Malta at the 1964 Summer Paralympics =

Malta in 1964 Summer Paralympics

- IPC code: MLT (MAT used at these Games)
- NPC: Malta Paralympic Committee
- Website: www.paralympic.mt

in Tokyo
- Competitors: 2 in 2 sports
- Medals: Gold 0 Silver 0 Bronze 2 Total 2

Summer Paralympics appearances (overview)
- 1960; 1964; 1968; 1972; 1976; 1980; 1984; 1988–2004; 2008; 2012; 2016; 2020; 2024

Malta participated in the 1964 Summer Paralympics in Tokyo, Japan. The country sent a delegation of two male athletes. C. Markham competed in both athletics (shot put) and snooker, while G. Portelli competed in snooker.

In the shot put (B category), Markham finished fourth (out of five contenders), with a throw of 6.40m. W. Prossl took gold for Germany, with a world record throw of 7.69m.

In snooker, the two Maltese competitors finished joint third, each winning bronze, while Michael Shelton took the gold medal for Great Britain.

Malta's two bronze medals constitute its second best result at the Paralympics to date, after its silver and two bronze in 1960.

Malta did not participate in the 1964 Summer Olympics, also held in Tokyo.

== Medallists ==
Medal	Name	Sport	Event	Result
Bronze	C. Markham	Snooker	Men's Snooker Event paraplegics - open	joint 3rd (specifics not recorded)
Bronze	G. Portelli	Snooker	Men's Snooker Event paraplegics - open	joint 3rd (specifics not recorded)
