= Archery at the 1972 Summer Paralympics =

Archery at the IV Paralympic Games
- Paralympic Archery pictogram
- Competitors: 150 from 27 nations

Archery at the 1972 Summer Paralympics consisted of twelve events.

== Medal table ==
Rank	Nation	Gold	Silver	Bronze	Total
1	West Germany (FRG)	7	1	3	11
2	South Africa (RSA)	2	2	0	4
3	France (FRA)	2	0	1	3
4	South Korea (KOR)	1	1	1	3
5	Great Britain (GBR)	0	3	1	4
6	United States (USA)	0	2	0	2
7	Australia (AUS)	0	1	1	2
7	Japan (JPN)	0	1	1	2
7	Netherlands (NED)	0	1	1	2
10	Italy (ITA)	0	0	1	1
Totals (10 entries)		12	12	10	34

=== Participating nations ===
- Australia (10)
- Austria (1)
- Belgium (4)
- Brazil (1)
- Canada (6)
- Denmark (5)
- Finland (3)
- France (12)
- Great Britain (15)
- Hong Kong (3)
- Hungary (1)
- India (1)
- Ireland (4)
- Israel (2)
- Italy (4)
- Jamaica (2)
- Japan (11)
- Kenya (1)
- Netherlands (7)
- New Zealand (1)
- Norway (8)
- South Africa (5)
- South Korea (5)
- Sweden (5)
- Switzerland (6)
- United States (11)
- West Germany (16)

== Medal summary ==
Event	Gold	Silver	Bronze
Men's FITA round open	E. Hammel; West Germany	Roy Fowler; Australia	P. Popkema; Netherlands
Men's FITA round team open	West Germany (FRG); Willi Brinkmann; Elbracht; E. Hammel	Netherlands (NED); Peter Blanker; Popke Popkema; Gérard van Opdorp	Australia (AUS); Alan Conn; Roy Fowler; Tony South
Men's short western round open	W. Kokott; South Africa	Jay Brown; United States	Keun Soo Kim; South Korea
Men's short western round team open	France (FRA); A. Piutti; Pytel; Seguin	United States (USA); Jay Brown; Patrick Krishner; McGee	West Germany (FRG); Bruckner; W. Flach; Spilger
Men's St. Nicholas round paraplegic	R. Schmidberger; West Germany	Nakamura; Japan	Busch; West Germany
Men's St. Nicholas round tetraplegic	Steiner; West Germany	Konkel; West Germany	Kazumi Ohashi; Japan
Women's FITA round open	Margaret Harriman; South Africa	Margaret Gibbs; Great Britain	Mireille Maraschin; France
Women's short western round open	Girard; France	van der Merwe; South Africa	Becker; West Germany
Women's St. Nicholas round paraplegic	Keum Im Cho; South Korea	E. Wolvaardt; South Africa	Chisa Yamahata; Japan
Women's St. Nicholas round tetraplegic	Liebrecht; West Germany	Barbara Anderson; Great Britain	Jane Blackburn; Great Britain
Mixed St. Nicholas round team paraplegic	West Germany (FRG); Busch; F. Herrmann; R. Schmidberger	South Korea (KOR); Keum Im Cho; Yong Heo; Hae Sik Lee	Italy (ITA); Iaculano Rocco Gaetano; Marras; Vittorio Paradiso
Mixed St. Nicholas round team tetraplegic	West Germany (FRG); Konkel; Liebrecht; Steiner	Great Britain (GBR); Barbara Anderson; Jane Blackburn; Tommy Taylor	None
