= Malta at the 2024 Summer Paralympics =

- IPC code: MLT
- NPC: Malta Paralympic Committee
- Website: www.paralympic.mt

in Paris, France August 28, 2024 – September 8, 2024
- Competitors: 2 (1 man and 1 woman) in 2 sports
- Flag bearers: Antonio Flores; Maja Theuma
- Medals: Gold 0 Silver 0 Bronze 0 Total 0

Summer Paralympics appearances (overview)
- 1960; 1964; 1968; 1972; 1976; 1980; 1984; 1988–2004; 2008; 2012; 2016; 2020; 2024

Malta competed at the 2024 Summer Paralympics in Paris, France, from 28 August to 8 September 2024. This was the nation's eleventh time competing at the Summer Paralympic Games after it made its debut at the 1960 Summer Paralympics. The delegation consisted of two competitors from two sports.

== Competitors ==
The following is the list of number of competitors in the Games.

| Sport | Men | Women | Total |
|---|---|---|---|
| Athletics | 1 | 0 | 1 |
| Swimming | 0 | 1 | 1 |
| Total | 1 | 1 | 2 |

== Athletics ==
| Athlete | Event | Heat | | Final | |
| Athlete | Event | Result | Rank | Result | Rank |
|---|---|---|---|---|---|
| Antonio Flores | Men's 100 metres T64 | 13.07 | 9 | Did not advance | |

== Swimming ==
| Athlete | Event | Heat | | Final | |
| Athlete | Event | Result | Rank | Result | Rank |
|---|---|---|---|---|---|
| Maja Theuma | Women's 50 metre freestyle S6 | 1:13.10 | 14 | Did not advance | |

== See also ==
- Malta at the 2024 Summer Olympics
- Malta at the Paralympics
