= Xu Xihan =

Chinese Paralympic swimmer

Personal information
- National team: China

Sport
- Sport: Swimming
- Strokes: Freestyle, butterfly
- Classifications: S5
Medal record
Paralympic Games
Gold medal – first place	2016 Rio	50 m butterfly S5

Xu Xihan is a Chinese Paralympic swimmer. She represented China at the 2016 Summer Paralympics and she won the gold medal in the women's 50 metre butterfly S5 event.
