= Snooker at the 1988 Summer Paralympics =

Snooker at the VIII Paralympic Games
- Venue: Chung-Nip Polio Centre, Seoul
- Dates: October 1988
- Competitors: 12 from 6 nations

Medalists
1st place, gold medalist(s)		Mike Langley	Great Britain
2nd place, silver medalist(s)		Michael White	Ireland
3rd place, bronze medalist(s)		Maurice Job	Great Britain

Paralympic symbol (1988-1994)

Snooker at the 1988 Summer Paralympics consisted of a men's open event. It was held at the Chung-Nip Polio Centre, Seoul.

There were twelve competitors, from six countries: three each from Great Britain and South Korea two each from Australia and Denmark, and one each from Egypt and the Republic of Ireland.

Mike Langley won the gold medal.

Snooker has not been included in the Paralympic Games since 1988.

== Medal summary ==
Event	Gold	Silver	Bronze
Men open	Mike Langley; Great Britain	Michael White; Ireland	Maurice Job; Great Britain
