= Snooker at the 1976 Summer Paralympics =

Snooker at the V Paralympic Games
- Venue: Seneca School
- Dates: August 1976
- Competitors: 18 from 6 nations

Snooker at the 1976 Summer Paralympics consisted of two men's events. The competitions were held at the Seneca School in August 1972.

There were eighteen competitors, from six countries: five each from Canada and the United States, four from Great Britain, two from Brazil, and one each from Australia and the Republic of Ireland.

Dean Mellway won the gold medal in the Men 2–5 event, and Tommy Taylor won gold in the Men's A-C competition.

== Medal summary ==
=== Medal table ===
* Host nation (Canada)

Rank	Nation	Gold	Silver	Bronze	Total
1	Great Britain	1	1	2	4
2	Canada*	1	0	0	1
3	United States	0	1	0	1
Totals (3 entries)		2	2	2	6

=== Medallists ===
Event	Gold	Silver	Bronze
Men 2–5	Dean Mellway; Canada	Brian Faulkner; Great Britain	Michael Shelton; Great Britain
Men A-C	Tommy Taylor; Great Britain	Rod Vleiger; United States	Peter Haslam; Great Britain
