= Thelma Young =

British Paralympic swimmer

Personal information
- Nationality: British
- Born: 8 September 1972 (age 53) Southampton, England

Sport
- Sport: Swimming

Thelma Young (born 8 September 1972) is a Paralympic swimmer from Great Britain.

== Early life ==
Young was born in Southampton with a congenital bi-lateral hemangioma. It is visible on the skin of her right arm. She has bone and vascular problems also.

She learnt to swim at the age of 6 years at Eastleigh Leisure Centre, Southampton. She then joined City of Southampton Swimming Club.

She was coached by father (William Young), Dave Heathcock (City of Southampton Swim Coach) and Mary Jenner (Les Autres GB Coach).

=== Sporting career ===
Thelma joined the Les Autres GB squad in 1986 after competing in their national championships.

Her first international competition was the 1987 European Championships in Paris, France. She won two gold, two silver and two bronze medals in the L6 class.

At the 1988 Seoul Games, she won two gold medals in the Women’s 4 × 100 m medley relay A-L and 4 × 100 m Freestyle relay A-L with Dianne Barr, Joanne Round and Linda Walters and two bronze medals in the Women’s 100 m Breaststroke L6 and Women’s 100 m Backstroke L6 events.[1,2,3,4]

At the 1989 World Youth Games in Miami, USA, she won four gold medals in the L6 class.

At her last international, she won one gold medal at the 1990 World Championships and Games for the Disabled in Assen, the Netherlands.

Thelma has a total of 15 international medals - 9 gold.

Young had to retire in 1991 due to ill health.

=== Personal life ===
Since retiring, Thelma has completed a Bachelor of Science(Hons)Degree in Sport Science at the University of Portsmouth - 1995-1998.

She is currently involved with the Scout Association.
