= Snooker at the 1968 Summer Paralympics =

Snooker at the III Paralympic Games
- Venue: Hayarkon Scouts Club, Tel Aviv
- Dates: 5–12 November 1968
- Competitors: 8 from 6 nations

Medalists
1st place, gold medalist(s)		Michael Shelton	Great Britain
2nd place, silver medalist(s)		Jimmy Gibson	Ireland
3rd place, bronze medalist(s)		John Newton	Australia
3rd place, bronze medalist(s)		Aroldo Ruschioni	Italy

Snooker at the 1968 Summer Paralympics consisted of a men's event. It was held at the Hayarkon Scouts Club, Tel Aviv from 5 to 12 November 1968.

There were eight competitors, from six countries: two each from Italy and Great Britain, and one each from Australia, Austria, the Republic of Ireland and Rhodesia.

Michael Shelton won the gold medal, as he had in 1964.

== Medal summary ==
Event	Gold	Silver	Bronze
Men open	Michael Shelton; Great Britain	Jimmy Gibson; Ireland	John Newton; Australia
Men open	Michael Shelton; Great Britain	Jimmy Gibson; Ireland	Aroldo Ruschioni; Italy
