= Lawn bowls at the 1988 Summer Paralympics =

(1988) Paralympic Lawn Bowls

Lawn bowls at the VIII Paralympic Games
- Paralympic Lawn bowls

Paralympic symbol (1988-1994)

Lawn bowls at the 1988 Summer Paralympics consisted of six events, five for men and one for women.

== Medal table ==
Rank	Nation	Gold	Silver	Bronze	Total
1	Great Britain (GBR)	3	2	2	7
2	Australia (AUS)	1	1	2	4
3	Ireland (IRL)	1	1	0	2
4	New Zealand (NZL)	1	0	1	2
5	South Korea (KOR)	0	1	1	2
6	Kenya (KEN)	0	1	0	1
Totals (6 entries)		6	6	6	18

== Medal summary ==
Event	Gold	Silver	Bronze
Men's singles 2–6	Ken Bridgeman; Great Britain	John Gronow; Great Britain	Neville Read; Australia
Men's singles LB1	Ralph Foster; Great Britain	Ho Joon Shon; South Korea	Chang Bok Lee; South Korea
Men's singles LB3	Peter Horne; New Zealand	Richard Coates; Great Britain	John Forsberg; Australia
Men's pairs 2–6	Australia (AUS); Roy Fowler; Stan Kosmala	Ireland (IRL); William Behan; Francis Bell	Great Britain (GBR); Ken Bridgeman; John Gronow
Men's pairs LB2	Great Britain (GBR); Neil Shaw; Bernard Wessier	Australia (AUS); David Boldery; Clifford Swann	New Zealand (NZL); John Davies; Peter Horne
Women's singles 2–6	Teresa Mullen; Ireland	Patricia Kihungi; Kenya	Hazel Randall; Great Britain
