= Dianne Barr =

British swimmer

Personal information
- Born: 13 September 1972 (age 53) Northern Ireland

Sport
- Country: United Kingdom
- Sport: Paralympic swimming
- Disability class: S10
Medal record
Paralympic swimming
Representing United Kingdom
Paralympic Games
Gold medal – first place	1988 Seoul	100m backstroke A4
Gold medal – first place	1988 Seoul	4x100m medley relay
Gold medal – first place	1988 Seoul	4x100m freestyle relay
Bronze medal – third place	1988 Seoul	100m freestyle A4
Bronze medal – third place	1988 Seoul	400m freestyle A4
Bronze medal – third place	1992 Barcelona	100m backstroke S10

Dianne Barr (born 13 September 1972) is a Northern Irish Paralympic swimmer from Larne. Barr started swimming at the age of four, and has a congenital abnormality of the lower leg. At the age of eleven, her lower leg was amputated and replaced with a prosthetic limb.

Barr represented Team GB & NI at the 1988 Summer Paralympic Games in Seoul, at the age of 16, winning gold in the 100m backstroke A4, the 4 × 100m medley relay and the 4 × 100m freestyle relay with her teammates Joanne Rout, Thelma Young and Linda Walters. She also won bronze in the 100m freestyle A4 and the 400m freestyle A4. At the 1992 Summer Paralympic Games, Barr won bronze in the 100m backstroke S10.

In 2012, Trevor Ringland, who like Barr attended Larne Grammar School, called for more recognition for Barr's impressive achievements.
