= Joanne Rout =

British Paralympic swimmer

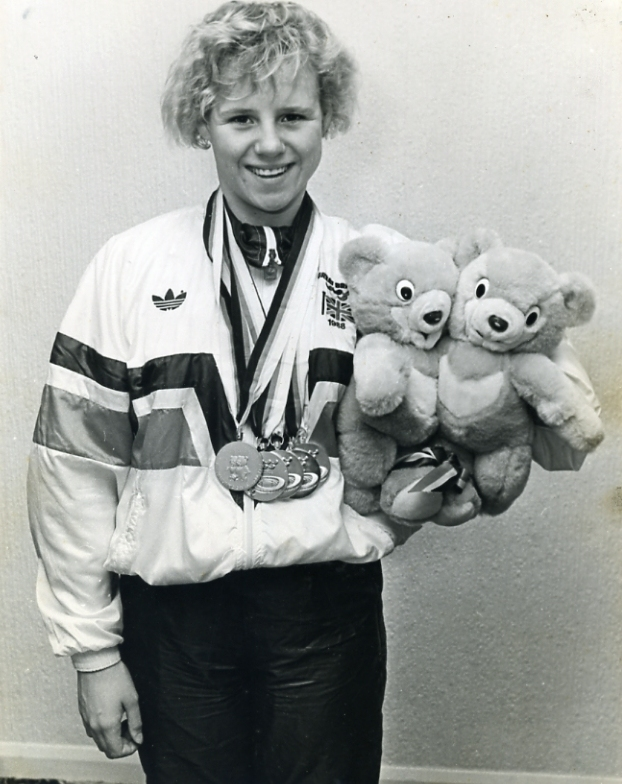
Joanne Rout, pictured here with her medals, taken in 1988 Seoul Korea

Joanne Elizabeth Rout, née Round (born 1975, Bishop Auckland, England) is a retired British Paralympic swimmer. Joanne came to national attention when she competed in the 1988 Seoul Paralympics. Round was the youngest member of the Great Britain Team aged just 12 years old, undeterred by the age and experience of the athletes around her. She won two Gold and three Silver medals and remains to this day the youngest British Gold Medal winning Paralympian.

== Personal life ==
Born on 31 October 1975, Round and her family soon moved south to Royal Tunbridge Wells. There Round attended Bishops Down Primary School and then went on to Bennett Memorial Diocesan School.

Round, who has a congenital limb deficiency, is missing her left arm from just below the elbow. She became interested in swimming at a very young age and swam for Monson Swimming Club.

She has maintained her interest in her sport and is now a qualified swimming teacher and volunteers at Beacon Swimming Club within the Life Saving section.

== Career ==
At the age of 12, Joanne Round was the youngest British athlete at the 1988 Summer Paralympics in Seoul. She competed in the 100m Breaststroke, Butterfly, Backstroke and Freestyle, the 200m Individual Medley and the 4x100 Freestyle and 4 × 100 m Medley Relays. She won Gold medals in both of the relays, also setting World Records in these events with her team mates Dianne Barr, Linda Walters and Thelma Young. Round also won individual Silver medals in the 100m Backstroke, 100m Butterfly and 200m Individual medley. She swam in what was then the A8 disability classification.

By June 1988 Round held 19 national records simultaneously.

== Honours and awards ==
Tunbridge Wells Borough Council honoured Rout with the award of their Civic Medallion after her return from Seoul in recognition of her efforts and achievements at such a young age.

In 2012 she was announced as a London 2012 Olympic Games Torchbearer. She carried the Torch through her home town of Crowborough.
