= Ralph G. Foster =

British athlete (1935–2021)

Personal information
- Full name: Ralph Gordon Foster
- Nationality: United Kingdom
- Born: 25 May 1935 Nottingham, England
- Died: 3 May 2021 (aged 85) Nottingham, England
Medal record
Lawn Bowls
Paralympic Games
Gold medal – first place	1988 Seoul	Men's Singles LB1

Ralph Gordon Foster (25 May 1935 – 3 May 2021) was a British athlete and Paralympic Games gold medal winner. After an accident in his late twenties left him a paraplegic he eventually became involved in disabled sports. He was a swimmer, snooker player and lawn bowler. Foster represented Great Britain in lawn bowling at the 1988 Summer Paralympics in Seoul and won a gold medal. He died after a long illness at his home in Nottingham, on 3 May 2021, at the age of 85.

== See also ==
- Lawn bowls at the 1988 Summer Paralympics
