= Jane Blackburn =

British Paralympic archer, athlete, lawn bowls player, swimmer and table tennis player

Personal information
- Nationality: British
Medal record
Representing Great Britain
Paralympic Games
Table tennis
Gold medal – first place	1972 Heidelberg	Women's doubles 1A-1B
Gold medal – first place	1976 Toronto	Women's doubles 1A-1B
Gold medal – first place	1980 Arnhem	Women's doubles 1A-1B
Gold medal – first place	1980 New York/Stoke Mandeville	Women's doubles 1A-1B
Silver medal – second place	1980 Arnhem	Women's Teams 2
Archery
Silver medal – second place	1972 Heidelberg	Women's singles 1B
Silver medal – second place	1972 Heidelberg	Mixed St. Nicholas round team tetraplegic
Bronze medal – third place	1972 Heidelberg	Women's St. Nicholas round tetraplegic
Lawn bowls
Gold medal – first place	1980 Arnhem	Women's Pairs 1A-1B
Silver medal – second place	1980 Arnhem	Women's Singles 1A-1B
Athletics
Bronze medal – third place	1976 Toronto	Women's pentathlon 1B

Jane Blackburn is a retired athlete who competed in a number of sports at five Paralympic Games.

At the 1972 Heidelberg Paralympics, Blackburn won gold in the table tennis Women's doubles 1A-1B alongside Barbara Anderson, and silver in the Archery women's singles 1B and Mixed St. Nicholas round team tetraplegic, alongside Anderson and Tommy Taylor. She also took bronze in the Women's St. Nicholas round tetraplegic.

Blackburn won a gold and bronze medal at the 1976 Toronto Paralympics, in the table tennis women's singles 1B and athletics women's pentathlon 1B respectively.

She again defended her table tennis singles 1B title at the 1980 Arnhem Paralympics, as well as winning lawn bowls gold and silver in the Women's Pairs 1A-1B (with Maggie McLellan) and Women's Singles 1A-1B respectively, plus a further silver in the table tennis, Women's Teams 2.

Blackburn's final Paralympic medal to date came at the 1984 New York/Stoke Mandeville Paralympics, once again in the Women's singles 1B.

In August 2021, Blackburn, alongside fellow Paralympian Susie Rodgers, lit the Paralympic Heritage Flame at Stoke Mandeville Stadium as part of the ceremony marking the start of the delayed Tokyo 2020 Paralympic Games.
