= Malta at the 1960 Summer Paralympics =

- IPC code: MLT (MAT used at these Games)
- NPC: Malta Paralympic Committee
- Website: www.paralympic.mt

in Rome
- Competitors: 4 in 3 sports
- Medals: Gold 0 Silver 2 Bronze 2 Total 4

Summer Paralympics appearances (overview)
- 1960; 1964; 1968; 1972; 1976; 1980; 1984; 1988–2004; 2008; 2012; 2016; 2020; 2024

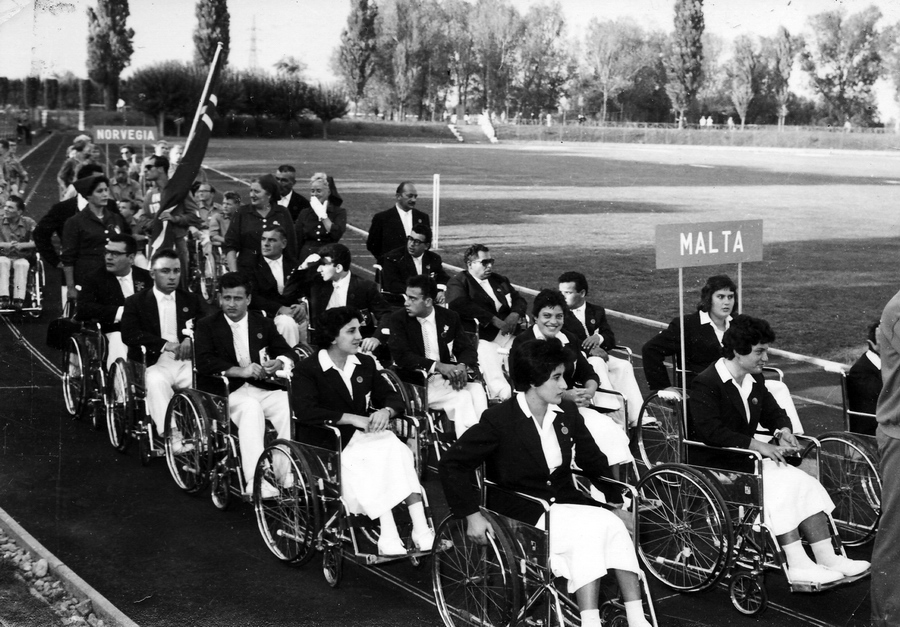
Malta at Rome 1960

Malta participated in the inaugural Paralympic Games in 1960 in Rome. The country sent four representatives (three men and a woman) to compete in athletics, snooker and table tennis. All four athletes won a medal. Malta won more medals than at any other edition of the Paralympic Games, and won its only silver medals to date; it would win bronze, at best, in subsequent Games.

== Medallists ==
Medal	Name	Sport	Event	Result
Silver	Angela Scicluna	Athletics	Women's shot put C	4.51
Silver	Moses Azzopardi	Table tennis	Men's singles C	2nd (specifics not recorded)
Bronze	Claude Markham	Athletics	Men's shot put B	7.03
Bronze	George Portelli	Snooker	Men's Snooker Event paraplegics - open	joint 3rd (specifics not recorded)

== See also ==
- Malta at the 1960 Summer Olympics
