= Snooker at the 1984 Summer Paralympics =

Snooker at the VII Paralympic Games
- Venue: Stoke Mandeville Stadium
- Dates: 22 July – 1 August 1984
- Competitors: 6 from 2 nations

Paralympic symbol (1988-1994)

Snooker at the 1984 Summer Paralympics consisted of two men's events. The competitions were held at Stoke Mandeville Stadium between 22 July and 1 August 1984.

There were six competitors: five from Great Britain, and one from the Republic of Ireland.

Jimmy Gibson won the gold medal in the Men's paraplegic event, and P. Haslam won gold in the Men's tetraplegic competition.

== Medal summary ==
Event	Gold	Silver	Bronze
Men paraplegic	Jimmy Gibson; Ireland	J. Buchanan; Great Britain	Mike Langley; Great Britain
Men tetraplegic	P. Haslam; Great Britain	K. Ellison; Great Britain	Tommy Taylor; Great Britain
