= Tommy Taylor (athlete) =

British Paralympic athlete

Sport
- Country: United Kingdom
- Sport: Para table tennis, lawn bowls, snooker, archery
Medal record
Paralympic Games
Table tennis
Gold medal – first place	Rome 1960	Men's Singles A
Gold medal – first place	Rome 1960	Men's Doubles A
Gold medal – first place	Tokyo 1964	Men's Singles A2
Gold medal – first place	Tokyo 1964	Men's Doubles A2
Gold medal – first place	Tel Aviv 1968	Men's Doubles A2
Gold medal – first place	Toronto 1976	Men's Doubles 1B
Gold medal – first place	Arnhem 1980	Men's Singles 1B
Gold medal – first place	Arnhem 1980	Men's Teams 1B
Bronze medal – third place	Heidelberg 1972	Men's Doubles 1B
Men's Pentathlon Incomplete
Bronze medal – third place	Tel Aviv 1968	Men's Pentathlon Incomplete
Archery
Silver medal – second place	Heidelberg 1972	Mixed St. Nicholas Round Team Tetraplegic
Snooker
Gold medal – first place	Toronto 1976	Men's Tournament A-C
Bronze medal – third place	Stoke Mandeville / New York 1984	Men's Tournament Tetraplegic
Lawn bowls
Gold medal – first place	Arnhem 1980	Men's Pairs 1A-1B
Bronze medal – third place	Arnhem 1980	Men's Singles 1A-1B
Bronze medal – third place	Stoke Mandeville / New York 1984	Men's Singles Tetraplegic

Tommy Taylor was a British Paralympic athlete who won sixteen medals across five sports, including ten gold medals. Taylor was treated by Ludwig Guttmann after an accident in 1956 caused severe paralysis. He went on to compete at numerous Paralympic Games, finding particular success in para table tennis from Rome 1960 to Arnhem 1980. Eight of Taylor's gold medals came in table tennis, along with one in snooker and one in lawn bowls.

== Paralympics ==
Taylor attended the first Paralympic Games in Rome in 1960, competing in the para table tennis. He won gold in both the men's singles A and, with M. Beck, the men's doubles A. His table tennis successes continued at the 1964 Games in Tokyo as he defended the titles in the reclassified A2 doubles, again with Beck, and the A2 singles against his doubles partner in the final. In Tel Aviv in 1968 Taylor lost in the quarterfinals of the singles competition but won the doubles again, this time partnered with Stephen Bradshaw. Also at these Games he entered the men's pentathlon incomplete, finishing in third place and thus securing a bronze medal.

At the 1972 Games in Heidelberg Taylor and Bradshaw lost against German competition in the semi-final, finishing in bronze medal position. Taylor did not compete for the singles title and instead entered the archery competition in a team which included fellow multiple-time Paralympian Jane Blackburn. The partnership of Taylor and Bradshaw returned to winning ways in 1976 in Toronto, while Taylor also entered and won the Men's Tournament A-C snooker.

Taylor won the Men's 1B singles table tennis competition in 1980 at the Games in Arnhem, and still competing alongside Bradshaw, beat Austria by straight sets in the doubles final to secure another gold for their country, Taylor's final Paralympic table tennis medal. Taylor found other Paralympic successes in 1980, winning medals in a fifth sport: lawn bowls. He won a bronze medal in singles competition and, alongside David Cale, won gold in the Men's Pairs 1A-1B. Taylor's final successes at the Paralympics came in 1984 in the Games jointly hosted by Stoke Mandeville and New York. Entered in the Men's Singles Tetraplegic category lawn bowls he won a bronze medal. That was equalled in the Men's Tournament Tetraplegic snooker, Taylor's second medal in the sport.
