= Snooker at the 1960 Summer Paralympics =

Snooker at the I Paralympic Games
- Venue: Tre Fontane Sports Ground, Rome

Medalists
1st place, gold medalist(s)		Cliff Keaton	Great Britain
2nd place, silver medalist(s)		Michael Shelton	Great Britain
3rd place, bronze medalist(s)		Giovanni Ferraris	Italy
3rd place, bronze medalist(s)		George Portelli	Malta

Snooker at the 1960 Summer Paralympics consisted of a men's event. It was held at the Tre Fontane Sports Ground, Rome. There were four competitors, from three different countries: two from Great Britain, and one each from Italy and Malta. Cliff Keaton won the gold medal. The event was played outdoors, in a covered area of a running track, on a table brought over from Stoke Mandeville Hospital.

== Medal summary ==
Event	Gold	Silver	Bronze
Men's paraplegics - open	Cliff Keaton; Great Britain	Michael Shelton; Great Britain	Giovanni Ferraris; Italy
Men's paraplegics - open	Cliff Keaton; Great Britain	Michael Shelton; Great Britain	George Portelli; Malta
