= Mick Langley =

British snooker player

Personal information
- Died: 14 July 2018

Sport
- Sport: Snooker
Medal record
Representing Great Britain
Paralympics
Bronze medal – third place	1984 Aylesbury	Snooker
Gold medal – first place	1988 Seoul	Snooker

Michael Langley (died 14 July 2018) was a British snooker player. He won the gold medal at the 1988 Paralympics, making him the last person to win a Paralympic snooker gold medal. He also won a bronze medal in the paraplegic snooker event at the 1984 Summer Paralympics.

Langley was a supporter of Slough Town.
