= Margaret Maughan =

British archer (1928–2020)

- in 2012

Personal information
- Born: 20 June 1928 Preston
- Died: 19 May 2020 (aged 91) Watford
Medal record
Representing Great Britain
Paralympic Games
Women's archery (B1)
Gold medal – first place	1960 Rome	Columbia Round open
Women's swimming (class 5)
Gold medal – first place	1960 Rome	50 m backstroke complete class 5
Women's dartchery
Gold medal – first place	1972 Heidelberg	Pairs open
Silver medal – second place	1976 Toronto	Pairs open
Women's lawn bowls (wh / 2-5)
Silver medal – second place	1976 Toronto	Pairs wh
Gold medal – first place	1980 Arnhem	Pairs 2–5

Margaret Gardner Maughan (20 June 1928 – 19 May 2020) was a British competitive archer, dartcher and lawn bowler. She was Britain's first gold medallist at the Paralympic Games, and won four gold and two silver medals at the Games. She lit the cauldron at the Olympic Stadium in London at the opening ceremony of the 2012 Summer Paralympics.

== Early life ==
Maughan was from Preston, Lancashire, England, and was one of four children. Her father was a miner. Maughan worked as a domestic science teacher at Bushey Meads School, Bushey, Hertfordshire. The same school as George Michael and Andrew Ridgeley. She also taught archery. Maughan was paralysed from the waist down and left unable to walk by a road accident in Nyasaland (now Malawi) in 1959. After being in hospital in Nyasaland for two months, she returned to Britain and was treated at Stoke Mandeville Hospital, where spinal injury unit founder Ludwig Guttmann pioneered the use of sport in therapy. There, she took up archery and joined an archery club. The hospital had been the site of the Stoke Mandeville Games, a sports competition for wheelchair athletes which subsequently developed into the Paralympic Games. Maughan said that archery helped her to maintain balance in her wheelchair. She competed at the 1960 National Wheelchair Games.

Maughan found gaining employment was difficult; although she was a qualified teacher it was assumed a woman in a wheelchair could not control a class of students. Prior to the accident, Maughan did not consider herself to be "sporty".

== Paralympic career ==
Maughan was selected as part of Britain's delegation to the Ninth Stoke Mandeville Games, later known as the First Summer Paralympic Games, held in Rome in 1960. Maughan competed in only one archery event, the Women's Columbia round open. Scoring 484 points, she won Britain's first ever Paralympic gold medal. Because of disorganisation in tracking the scores, she had to be taken from the coach heading back to the Olympic village to be presented with her prize. Maughan also took part in swimming, in the Women's 50 metre backstroke complete class 5. As she was the only competitor in the race, she won by completing the full 50 metres, with a time of 1:49.2.

Wheelchair accessibility in transport and housing was not a major consideration at the time, and Maughan would later relate how she and her British teammates were moved onto the plane to Rome with forklift trucks. Once at the Games, Italian army soldiers had to be called in to carry them up and down the stairs to the athletes' residences. At her archery medal ceremony, the medal podium contained ramps to allow the athletes to reach the podiums. Returning home from the Games, Maughan and her wheelchair had to travel in the guard's van on the train back to Preston.

Maughan did not take part in the 1964 Games, but returned for the 1968 Summer Paralympics in Tel Aviv. She entered two events in archery – the Women's albion round open and the Women's FITA round open. With scores of 571 and 1534, she finished fourth and fifth, respectively.

At the 1972 Games in Heidelberg, Maughan again competed in the Women's FITA round open, finishing sixth with a score of 1699. She also entered dartchery, with a teammate whose name is recorded as M. Cooper, in the Women's pairs open. They took the gold medal, ahead of France and Norway.

At the 1976 Summer Paralympics in Toronto, Maughan diversified further. She and teammate M. Cooper obtained the silver medal in the Women's pairs open in dartchery, behind the United States and ahead of South Africa. In archery, in the Women's advanced metric round open, she finished fifth with a score of 568. Entering two events in lawn bowls, she obtained two victories to finish fourth in the Women's singles wh – the gold going to South Africa's Margaret Harriman – while British competitors took silver and bronze. In the Women's pairs wh, she and teammate F. Nowak took the silver medal (behind South Africa and ahead of another British pair), with three victories. In the late 1970s, Maughan took part in the Commonwealth Games for the Paralysed, winning multiple medals.

At the 1980 Summer Paralympics, for her fifth and final appearance at the Paralympic Games, Maughan competed only in lawn bowls. In the Women's singles 2–5, she was beaten 4:21 by Germany's Swanepoel, and 12:21 by fellow British competitor R. Thompson, finishing fourth and last. But in the Women's pairs 2–5, she teamed up with R. Thompson to win her final gold medal, beating a Maltese pair 13:9 then a British pair by an unrecorded score.

== Post career and death ==
After retiring from sport, Maughan worked as a coach at the Stoke Mandeville club. She was the final torch bearer, who lit the Paralympic Flame, opening the 2012 Summer Paralympics in London.

Maughan died on 19 May 2020 at the age of 91 at Watford General Hospital. Speaking after her death was announced, Nick Webborn, chair of the British Paralympic Association, said that "although her passing is extremely sad the fact that she lived until the age of 91 is testament to the work of Sir Ludwig Guttman who transformed the care of people with spinal cord injury, and that through sport people with disabilities can enjoy rich and fulfilling lives".
