= Michael Shelton =

British sportsman

Personal information
- Nationality: British
- Born: Around 1941 Newstead/ Kirkby/ Annesley
- Died: January 2022 (aged 80–81) Newstead Village, Nottinghamshire, England
- Spouse: Iris Turner
- Relatives: Victor Shelton, Tony Dhelton, Tommy Shelton, Annie Shelton, Arthur Shelton + 2 more
Medal record
Representing Great Britain
Paralympic Games
Snooker
Gold medal – first place	1964 Tokyo	Men's open
Gold medal – first place	1968 Tel Aviv	Men's open
Gold medal – first place	1972 Heidelberg	Men's paraplegic open
Silver medal – second place	1960 Rome	Men's open
Bronze medal – third place	1976 Toronto	Men's 2-5
Lawn bowls
Gold medal – first place	1976 Toronto	Men's singles wh

Michael Shelton is a British sportsman who competed at the Summer Paralympic Games five times between 1960 and 1976 in snooker and other sports. He won six Paralympic medals, four gold, a silver and a bronze. He also won gold at the 1974 Commonwealth Paraplegic Games.

Shelton was from Newstead, Nottinghamshire and had been a miner at Newstead Colliery. His back was injured in 1958 by a roof fall, and he was paralysed from the waist down. In 1969 he married Iris Turner, who had been a nursing sister on his ward when he was in hospital.

He played for the Lodge Moor Hospital paraplegic snooker team, which in 1974 was refused entry to the Sheffield and District Works Sports Association league, on the basis that they would gain unfair advantage from playing all of their fixtures at their home venue, apparently failing to acknowledge that the team would be unable to play at other venues with stairs or limited space around the tables. The team was subsequently given the chance to participate in the Sheffield Social Snooker League and play all their games at their own home base.

== Paralympic career ==
In 1960, at the inaugural Paralympic Games in Rome, Shelton won a silver medal in the snooker, he had also competed in the precision javelin throw and shot put C where he finished 41st and 24th respectively in the events. He followed this up with three consecutive gold medals, at the 1964 Tokyo Paralympics, 1968 Tel Aviv Paralympics, and 1972 Heidelberg Paralympics.

At the 1976 Toronto Paralympics, Shelton won bronze in the Men's 2-5 Snooker, but took the gold medal in the lawn bowls, men's singles wh.
