= Fencing at the Summer Paralympics =

- Events: 12 (men: 7; women: 5)

Games
- 1960; 1964; 1968; 1972; 1976; 1980; 1984; 1988; 1992; 1996; 2000; 2004; 2008; 2012; 2016; 2020; 2024
- Medalists

Para fencing (called wheelchair fencing prior to 2025) has been contested at every Summer Paralympic Games since they were first held in 1960. The sport is governed by World Abilitysport.

== Summary ==
Games	Year	Events	Best Nation
1	1960	3	Italy
2	1964	7	Italy
3	1968	10	Italy
4	1972	11	Italy
5	1976	14	France
6	1980	17	France
7	1984	15	France
8	1988	14	France
9	1992	14	France
10	1996	15	France
11	2000	15	Poland
12	2004	15	Hong Kong
13	2008	10	China
14	2012	12	China
15	2016	14	China
16	2020	16	China
17	2024	16	China

== Medal table ==
Updated after the 2024 Summer Paralympics

Rank	Nation	Gold	Silver	Bronze	Total
1	France (FRA)	64	43	38	145
2	China (CHN)	44	23	16	83
3	Italy (ITA)	26	32	28	86
4	Hong Kong (HKG)	22	18	16	56
5	Germany (GER)	13	24	19	56
6	Great Britain (GBR)	13	15	24	52
7	Poland (POL)	10	15	11	36
8	Hungary (HUN)	4	12	11	27
9	Thailand (THA)	4	2	3	9
10	Ukraine (UKR)	3	6	8	17
11	Israel (ISR)	3	5	6	14
12	South Korea (KOR)	3	2	1	6
13	RPC (RPC)	2	2	3	7
14	Belarus (BLR)	1	1	0	2
14	Brazil (BRA)	1	1	0	2
16	Spain (ESP)	1	0	5	6
17	Iraq (IRQ)	0	2	0	2
18	Belgium (BEL)	0	1	4	5
19	Kuwait (KUW)	0	1	2	3
19	Netherlands (NED)	0	1	2	3
19	United States (USA)	0	1	2	3
22	Australia (AUS)	0	1	1	2
22	Georgia (GEO)	0	1	1	2
22	Greece (GRE)	0	1	1	2
25	Japan (JPN)	0	1	0	1
26	Turkey (TUR)	0	0	1	1
Totals (26 entries)		214	211	203	628

== Nations ==
Nation	60	64	68	72	76	80	84	88	92	96	00	04	08	12	16	20	Total
Argentina (ARG)								1		1	1	1		1			5
Australia (AUS)		4	7	1				2	1		2						6
Austria (AUT)														1			1
Belarus (BLR)													2	5	5		3
Belgium (BEL)			5	5	7	2	1		1								6
Brazil (BRA)										1	1	1		1	8		5
Canada (CAN)											2		1	2	2		4
China (CHN)												3	9	9	12		4
France (FRA)		3	9	9	10	12	10	10	10	13	10	11	9	11	9		14
Georgia (GEO)															1		1
Germany (GER)									9	10	9	7	1	1	2		7
Great Britain (GBR)		6	11	10	13	5	4	9	7	6	5	1	1	7	3		14
Greece (GRE)					1							2	3	4	4		5
Hong Kong (HKG)				2	1		1	7	5	7	6	11	6	8	7		11
Hungary (HUN)									1	2	8	6	7	8	6		7
Iraq (IRQ)									3			1		1	2		4
Israel (ISR)			8	5	5	5	4	4			1						7
Italy (ITA)	9	8	15	12	9	15	9	13	11	11	9	7	7	5	8		15
Japan (JPN)		3			1						1	2	1				5
Kuwait (KUW)							1	5	3	3	5	3	4	1			8
Latvia (LAT)															1		1
Macau (MAC)														1			1
Malaysia (MAS)												1		1			2
Mexico (MEX)				1	1												2
Netherlands (NED)						2											1
New Zealand (NZL)			2														1
Oman (OMA)								1									1
Poland (POL)										2	9	12	7	10	9		6
Russia (RUS)													5	12			2
South Korea (KOR)								5	5	2	1	1	1	1			7
Spain (ESP)									6	4	4	6	6	1			6
Thailand (THA)												1	2	1	1		4
Ukraine (UKR)											1	3	7	7	7		5
United States (USA)		3	4							8	9	8	5	6	2		8
West Germany (FRG)			4	7	6	4	3	9									6
Nations	1	6	9	9	10	7	8	11	12	13	18	20	19	24	18		
Competitors	9	27	65	52	54	45	33	71	62	70	84	88	84	105	89		
Year	60	64	68	72	76	80	84	88	92	96	00	04	08	12	16	20	

== See also ==
- Fencing at the Summer Olympics
