= Archery at the 1984 Summer Paralympics – Men's short metric round team 1A-6 =

Men's short metric round team 1A-6 at the VII Paralympic Games
- Paralympic Archery
- Competitors: 3 from 3 nations

Medalists
| 1st place, gold medalist(s) | | unknown | France |
| 2nd place, silver medalist(s) | | Ian Trewhella; David Higgins; Stephen Austen | Australia |
| 3rd place, bronze medalist(s) | | Ernest Arnold; Kevin Bowser; James Martin | Great Britain |

The Men's short metric round team 1A-6 was an archery competition in the 1984 Summer Paralympics.

The French team won the gold medal.

== Results ==
| Rank | Athlete | Points |
|---|---|---|
| 1st place, gold medalist(s) | France (FRA) | 5174 |
| 2nd place, silver medalist(s) | Australia (AUS); Ian Trewhella; David Higgins; Stephen Austen | 4634 |
| 3rd place, bronze medalist(s) | Great Britain (GBR); Ernest Arnold; Kevin Bowser; James Martin | 4368 |
