= Archery at the 1984 Summer Paralympics – Men's double advanced metric round paraplegic =

Men's double FITA round 2-6 at the VII Paralympic Games
- Paralympic Archery
- Competitors: 11 from 7 nations

Medalists
1st place, gold medalist(s)		J. M. Chapuis	France
2nd place, silver medalist(s)		C. Bouchite	France
3rd place, bronze medalist(s)		Patrick Krishner	United States

The Men's Double Advanced Metric Round Paraplegic was an archery competition in the 1984 Summer Paralympics.

Gold medalist was Frenchman J.M. Chapuis who won his fourth gold medal in archery.

== Results ==
Rank	Athlete	Points
1st place, gold medalist(s)	J. M. Chapuis (FRA)	1817
2nd place, silver medalist(s)	C. Bouchite (FRA)	1723
3rd place, bronze medalist(s)	Patrick Krishner (USA)	1675
4	P. Lajuncomme (FRA)	1634
5	S. Solorzand (MEX)	1622
6	Oskar Kreuzer (AUT)	1599
7	David Higgins (AUS)	1577
8	Stephen Austen (AUS)	1553
9	Kevin Bowser (GBR)	1526
10	James Martin (GBR)	1406
11	Gaetan Bertrand (CAN)	1371
