= Rachel Tassa =

Israeli Paralympic sportswoman

Personal information
- Native name: רחל טסה
- Born: 1952 (age 73–74)

Sport
- Country: Israel
- Sport: Wheelchair basketball Wheelchair fencing Swimming
Medal record
Representing Israel
Paralympic Games
Wheelchair fencing
Gold medal – first place	1972 Heidelberg	Team
Bronze medal – third place	1972 Heidelberg	Individual
Silver medal – second place	1976 Toronto	Individual
Silver medal – second place	1980 Arnhem	Team
Bronze medal – third place	1988 Seoul	Team
Wheelchair basketball
Bronze medal – third place	1972 Heidelberg	Women's tournament
Gold medal – first place	1976 Toronto	Women's tournament
Silver medal – second place	1980 Arnhem	Women's tournament
Silver medal – second place	1984 Stoke Mandeville	Women's tournament
Swimming
Bronze medal – third place	1972 Heidelberg	100m freestyle
Bronze medal – third place	1976 Toronto	50m butterfly

Rachel Tassa (Hebrew: רחל טסה; born 1952) is a former Israeli wheelchair fencer and wheelchair basketball player. She won 11 Paralympic medals: two individual medals in wheelchair fencing, two medals in swimming and seven medals as a member of Israel's women's team in wheelchair basketball and wheelchair fencing.

Tassa contracted polio when she was 18 months old. At the age of 11, in 1964 she began her practice at the Israel Sports Center for the Disabled.

At the 1972 Summer Paralympics, she won four medals: a gold medal in Women's Novices Foil and a bronze medal as a member of the women's wheelchair basketball team, an individual bronze medal in women's foil and a second bronze medal for swimming, reaching third place at the 100m freestyle tournament. Tassa competed in other fencing and swimming events, setting high scores but failing to achieve further medals.

At the 1976 Summer Paralympics, she won a gold medal as a member of the women's wheelchair basketball team and two individual medals: a silver medal in women's foil and a bronze medal competing at the women's 50m butterfly swimming event

At the 1980 Summer Paralympics, she won two silver medals as a member of the women's foil team in wheelchair fencing and the women's wheelchair basketball team.

At the 1984 Summer Paralympics, she won a silver medal as a member of Israel's women's wheelchair basketball team.

At the 1988 Summer Paralympics, she won her final bronze medal with the women's wheelchair fencing foil team.
