= Ariela Meizan =

Israeli paralympic athlete

Personal information
- Native name: אריאלה מייזן

Sport
- Country: Israel
- Sport: Swimming; Wheelchair basketball
Medal record
Representing Israel
Paralympic Games
Swimming
Gold medal – first place	1976 Toronto	25m freestyle
Gold medal – first place	1976 Toronto	25m backstroke
Gold medal – first place	1976 Toronto	25m breaststroke
Wheelchair basketball
Bronze medal – third place	1972 Heidelberg	Women's tournament
Gold medal – first place	1976 Toronto	Women's tournament
Silver medal – second place	1980 Arnhem	Women's tournament
Silver medal – second place	1984 Stoke Mandeville	Women's tournament

Ariela Meizan née Cohen (Hebrew: אריאלה מייזן) is a former Israeli paralympic swimmer and wheelchair basketball player. She won seven Paralympic medals, three individual medals in swimming and four medals as a member of the women's wheelchair basketball team.

At the 1972 Summer Paralympics, she won a bronze medal as a member of the women's team in wheelchair basketball. She took part in various tournaments in swimming and athletics, reaching fourth to eighth place in numerous competitions and failing to reach the final round in two others.

At the 1976 Summer Paralympics, she won four gold medals: one as a member of the women's basketball team and three individual medals in swimming.

Meizan was a member of Israel's women's wheelchair basketball team to three more Paralympic Games, winning silver medals at the 1980 Summer Paralympics and at the 1984 Summer Paralympics and making her final appearance at the 1988 Summer Paralympics.

Among her achievements at the IWAS World Games, at the 1970 Stoke Mandeville Games Meizan won three gold medals in swimming and in wheelchair fencing as well as other achievements, including a bronze medal in swimming. At the 1971 Stoke Mandeville Games she gained a gold medals in the 75m freestyle swimming tournament and as a member of the women's wheelchair fencing team. She won several gold medals in swimming at the 1978 Stoke Mandeville Games.
