= Ayala Malchan-Katz =

Israeli paralympic sportswoman

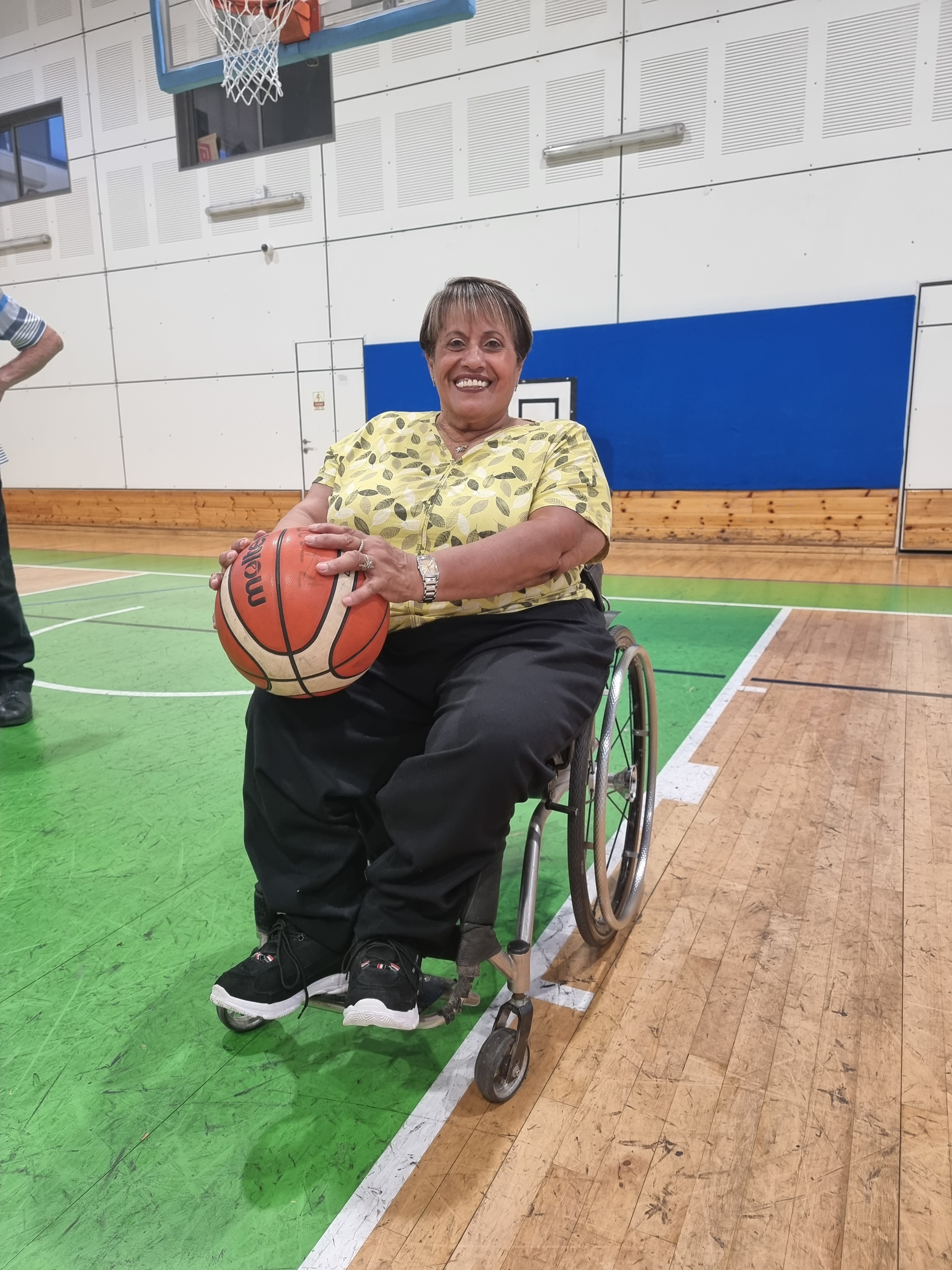

Personal information
- Native name: איילה מלצ'ן-כץ
- Born: 1949 (age 76–77) Jerusalem, Israel

Sport
- Country: Israel
- Sport: Paralympic athletics Wheelchair basketball Wheelchair fencing
- Disability: Polio
Medal record
Representing Israel
Wheelchair fencing
Gold medal – first place	1972 Heidelberg	Foil team
Gold medal – first place	1976 Toronto	Foil novice team
Gold medal – first place	1980 Arnhem	Foil individual 2-3
Silver medal – second place	1980 Arnhem	Foil team
Silver medal – second place	1984 Stoke Mandeville	Foil Team
Bronze medal – third place	1968 Tel Aviv	Novices foil
Bronze medal – third place	1976 Toronto	Foil individual 2-3
Bronze medal – third place	1988 Seoul	Foil team
Paralympic Games
Women's wheelchair basketball
Gold medal – first place	1968 Tel Aviv	wheelchair basketball
Gold medal – first place	1976 Toronto	wheelchair basketball
Silver medal – second place	1980 Arnhem	wheelchair basketball
Silver medal – second place	1984 New York	wheelchair basketball
Bronze medal – third place	1972 Heidelberg	wheelchair basketball

Ayala Malchan-Katz (Hebrew: איילה מלצ'ן-כץ; born 1949) is an Israeli Paralympic athlete. Between the years 1968-1988 she participated in six Paralympic competitions and won 13 medals, of which 5 were gold.

== Life ==
Katz fell ill at the age of three months with polio which affected her lower limbs. For nine years she was treated in a hospital in Jerusalem and at the age of nine she returned to her parents' home in Rosh HaAyin .

As part of her medical rehabilitation, she began competing in disabled sports and participated in swimming, fencing and wheelchair basketball competitions.

Katz lives in Petah Tikva and is the head of the municipal framework of the national program "Accessible Community" which works to implement a law of equal rights for people with disabilities.

== Career ==
At the 1968 Summer Paralympics, she won a gold medal in women's wheelchair basketball and a bronze medal in Women's Novices Foil. She competed in Women's Shot Put C, Women's Discus Throw C, Women's Javelin C, Women's Novices 60 meters B, Women's Slalom B, Women's Club Throw C, and Women's 50 m Backstroke Class 3 incomplete.

At the 1972 Summer Paralympics, she competed in Women's 60 meters Wheelchair 3, Women's Slalom 3, and Women's 50 m Backstroke 3. She won a gold medal as a member of the women's fencing team and a bronze medal with the Israeli wheelchair basketball team.

At the 1976 Summer Paralympics, she won a gold medal in Women's Foil Novice Team, and bronze medal in Women's Foil Individual 2-3.

At the 1980 Summer Paralympics, she won a gold medal in women's individual foil and a silver medal in Women's Foil Team.

At the 1984 Summer Paralympics, she won a silver medal in women's wheelchair fencing foil team.

At the 1988 Summer Paralympics, she won a bronze medal in Women's Foil Team. She competed in Women's Wheelchair Basketball.
