= Margalit Peretz =

Israeli paralympic athlete

Personal information
- Native name: מרגלית פרץ

Sport
- Country: Israel
- Sport: Wheelchair basketball Wheelchair fencing
Medal record
Representing Israel
Paralympic Games
Wheelchair fencing
Gold medal – first place	1972 Heidelberg	Team
Gold medal – first place	1976 Toronto	Foil Novice team
Silver medal – second place	1980 Arnhem	Foil team
Bronze medal – third place	1980 Arnhem	Individual
Silver medal – second place	1984 Stoke Mandeville	Foil team
Bronze medal – third place	1988 Seoul	Foil team
Wheelchair basketball
Bronze medal – third place	1972 Heidelberg	Women's tournament
Gold medal – first place	1976 Toronto	Women's tournament
Silver medal – second place	1980 Arnhem	Women's tournament

Margalit Peretz (Hebrew: מרגלית פרץ) is a former Israeli wheelchair fencer and wheelchair basketball player. She won nine Paralympic medals, one individual medal in wheelchair fencing, three medals as a member of the women's wheelchair basketball team and five medals as a member of the women's wheelchair fencing team.

Peretz was active in the Israel Sports Center for the Disabled.

At the 1972 Summer Paralympics, she won a gold medal in Women's Novices Foil, and reached sixth place at the individual women's wheelchair foil fencing tournament.

At the 1976 Summer Paralympics, she won a gold medal as a member of the women's foil novice team and a second gold medal as member of the women's wheelchair basketball team.

At the 1978 national wheelchair fencing championship in Israel, Peretz won the gold medal.

At the 1980 Summer Paralympics, she won a bronze medal in individual wheelchair fencing and two silver medals as a member of the women's foil team in wheelchair fencing and the women's wheelchair basketball team.

At the 1984 Summer Paralympics, she won a silver medal in women's wheelchair fencing foil team.

At the 1986 World Championship for Disabled Sports held in Belgium, Peretz won the silver medal in wheelchair fencing.

At the 1988 Summer Paralympics, she won her final bronze medal with the women's wheelchair fencing foil team.

Among her achievements at the IWAS World Games, Peretz won two gold medals at the 1971 Stoke Mandeville Games in both individual and team tournaments and an individual silver medal at the 1975 Stoke Mandeville Games.
