= Chemda Levy =

Israeli Paralympic competitor

Personal information
- Native name: חֶמְדָּה לֵבִי

Sport
- Country: Israel
- Sport: Wheelchair basketball Wheelchair fencing
Medal record
Representing Israel
Paralympic Games
Wheelchair fencing
Gold medal – first place	1976 Toronto	Foil Novice team
Silver medal – second place	1980 Arnhem	Foil team
Bronze medal – third place	1980 Arnhem	Foil individual
Silver medal – second place	1984 Stoke Mandeville	Team
Bronze medal – third place	1988 Seoul	Foil team
Wheelchair basketball
Gold medal – first place	1976 Toronto	Women's tournament
Silver medal – second place	1980 Arnhem	Women's tournament
Silver medal – second place	1984 Stoke Mandeville	Women's tournament

Chemda Levy (Hebrew: חֶמְדָּה לֵבִי) née Shevah is a former Israeli wheelchair fencer and wheelchair basketball player. She won eight Paralympic medals: one individual medal in wheelchair fencing, four medals as a member of the women's wheelchair fencing team and three medals, as a member of the women's wheelchair basketball team.

== Career ==
=== Sport ===
Levy was active at the Israel Sports Center for the Disabled.

At the 1976 Summer Paralympics, she won a gold medal as a member of the women's foil novice team and a second gold medal as member of the women's wheelchair basketball team.

At the 1980 Summer Paralympics, she won a bronze medal in individual wheelchair fencing and two silver medals as a member the women's teams in wheelchair fencing and in wheelchair basketball.

At the 1984 Summer Paralympics, she won a silver medal in women's wheelchair fencing team and an additional silver medal as a member of the women's wheelchair basketball team.

At the 1988 Summer Paralympics, she won her final bronze medal with the women's wheelchair fencing foil team.

=== Psychology ===
Levy is a psychologist who worked at Loewenstein Rehabilitation Hospital and appointed in 2014 to head its center for vocational rehabilitation and training.

== Personal life ==
She married paralympic athlete Moshe Levy.
