= Archery at the 1984 Summer Paralympics – Men's double FITA round division 3 =

Men's double FITA round division 3 at the VII Paralympic Games
- Paralympic Archery
- Competitors: 6 from 6 nations

Medalists
1st place, gold medalist(s)		Kjell Løvvold	Norway
2nd place, silver medalist(s)		Alfons Kuys	Belgium
3rd place, bronze medalist(s)		Benoit Tanquerel	France

The Men's double FITA round division 3 was an archery competition at the 1984 Summer Paralympics.

The Norwegian archer, Kjell Løvvold won the gold medal.

== Results ==
Rank	Athlete	Points
1st place, gold medalist(s)	Kjell Løvvold (NOR)	526
2nd place, silver medalist(s)	Alfons Kuys (BEL)	550
3rd place, bronze medalist(s)	Benoit Tanquerel (FRA)	490
4	Patrick Ruiz (FRA)	430
5	Kevin Reed (GBR)	298
