= Archery at the 1984 Summer Paralympics – Men's double advanced metric round team 1A-6 =

Men's double advanced metric round team 1A-6 at the VII Paralympic Games
- Paralympic Archery
- Competitors: 1 from 1 nation

Medalists
1st place, gold medalist(s)		France	France

The 'Men's Double Advanced Metric Round Paraplegic was an archery competition in the 1984 Summer Paralympics.

As the only competitors in this event, the French team won the gold medal unopposed.

== Results ==
Rank	Athlete	Points
1st place, gold medalist(s)	France (FRA)	1817
