= Archery at the 1984 Summer Paralympics – Men's double FITA round C1-C2 =

Men's double FITA round C1-C2 at the VII Paralympic Games
- Paralympic Archery
- Competitors: 1 from 1 nation

Medalists
1st place, gold medalist(s)		David Barefoot	Canada

The Men's double FITA round C1-C2 was an archery competition in the 1984 Summer Paralympics.

Canadian archer David Barefoot won the gold medal unopposed.

== Results ==
Rank	Athlete	Points
1st place, gold medalist(s)	David Barefoot (CAN)	57
