= Uplands Ski Centre =

Ski area in Vaughan, Ontario, Canada

- Location within Regional Municipality of York Location within Southern Ontario Location within Ontario
- Location: Vaughan, Ontario, Canada
- Nearest city: Within Vaughan (near Toronto)
- Coordinates: 43°49′29.24″N 79°26′17.86″W
- Vertical: 30 m (98 ft)
- Website: Uplands Ski Centre

Uplands Ski Centre is a small ski area located in Vaughan, in the Thornhill district, just north of Toronto. Operated by Uplands Golf Club, it constitutes a modest ski hill on a 36-hectare property. First opened in 1922, the club was purchased by the City of Vaughan in 1988 and features a ski hill with five runs, two terrain parks and a chair lift.

The hill is part of the valley formation along the East Don River and is one of two ski areas along the Don River (see North York Ski Centre).

Beginning with a pilot project in 2009, the City of Vaughan spends $2500 yearly to maintain part of the first hole of the golf course as a tobogganing hill through the winter by clearing obstacles and placing straw bales.

In 2022, Central Counties Tourism announced funding for ski hill upgrades at Uplands as part of a $3.6 million York Region COVID-19 pandemic tourism recovery fund.

== See also ==
- North York Ski Centre
- Centennial Park
- Beaver Valley Ski Club
- List of ski areas and resorts in Canada
