= Wheelchair basketball at the 1976 Summer Paralympics =

Wheelchair basketball at the V Paralympic Games
- Paralympic Wheelchair Basketball
- Venue: Centennial Park Olympium

Medalists
1st place, gold medalist(s)		United States (men); Israel (women)
2nd place, silver medalist(s)		Israel (men); West Germany (women)
3rd place, bronze medalist(s)		France (men); Argentina (women)

Wheelchair basketball at the 1976 Summer Paralympics consisted of men's and women's team events. The competition was held at the Centennial Park Olympium in Toronto, Ontario, Canada.

== Medal summary ==
Event	Gold	Silver	Bronze
Men's team	United States	Israel	France
Women's team	Israel Rachel Tassa; Esther Terry; Hemda Shevah; Ariela Mizan; Malee Miller; Ayala Milhan; Margalit Peretz; Zipora Rubin-Rosenbaum; Batya Shvicky	West Germany Silke Boll; B. Eckert; Gisela Hermes; Isecke; Ruth Lamsbach; Rita Laux; Stercken; Martina Tschoetschel	Argentina

Source: Paralympic.org

== See also ==
- Basketball at the 1976 Summer Olympics
