= Sicari =

Sicari is a surname of South Italian origin. Notable people with the surname include:

- Rosa Sicari (1948–2007), Italian Paralympian
- Vincenza Sicari (born 1979), Italian long-distance runner

== See also ==
- Sicarii
