= Kevin Davids =

British actor

Personal information
- Born: Doncaster, Yorkshire, England
Medal record
Wheelchair fencing
Representing Great Britain
Paralympic Games
Gold medal – first place	1984 New York/Stoke Mandeville	Sabre individual 4-5

Kevin Davids (born Kevin Davies) is a British actor and Paralympic fencing champion. He is best known for his role as Syd in the BBC television series I'm with Stupid. In 2003 he was one of the two supporting cast members in the short film Shotgun Dave Rides East, which starred Peter Capaldi and Tim Dantay as the two leads. In 2014, 2015, & 2018 he appeared in Coronation Street as an important client of the Underworld factory.

== Paralympic career ==
At the 1984 Summer Paralympics, Davies took gold in the wheelchair fencing sabre individual 4-5 event.
