= Goodknight =

Goodknight or GoodKnight is a surname. Notable people with the surname include:

- Glen GoodKnight (1941–2010), American educator
- Rosie Stephenson-Goodknight (born 1953), American Wikipedia editor
- Terri Goodknight, American Paralympic basketball player
