= Centennial Park Conservatory =

Canadian conservatory greenhouse

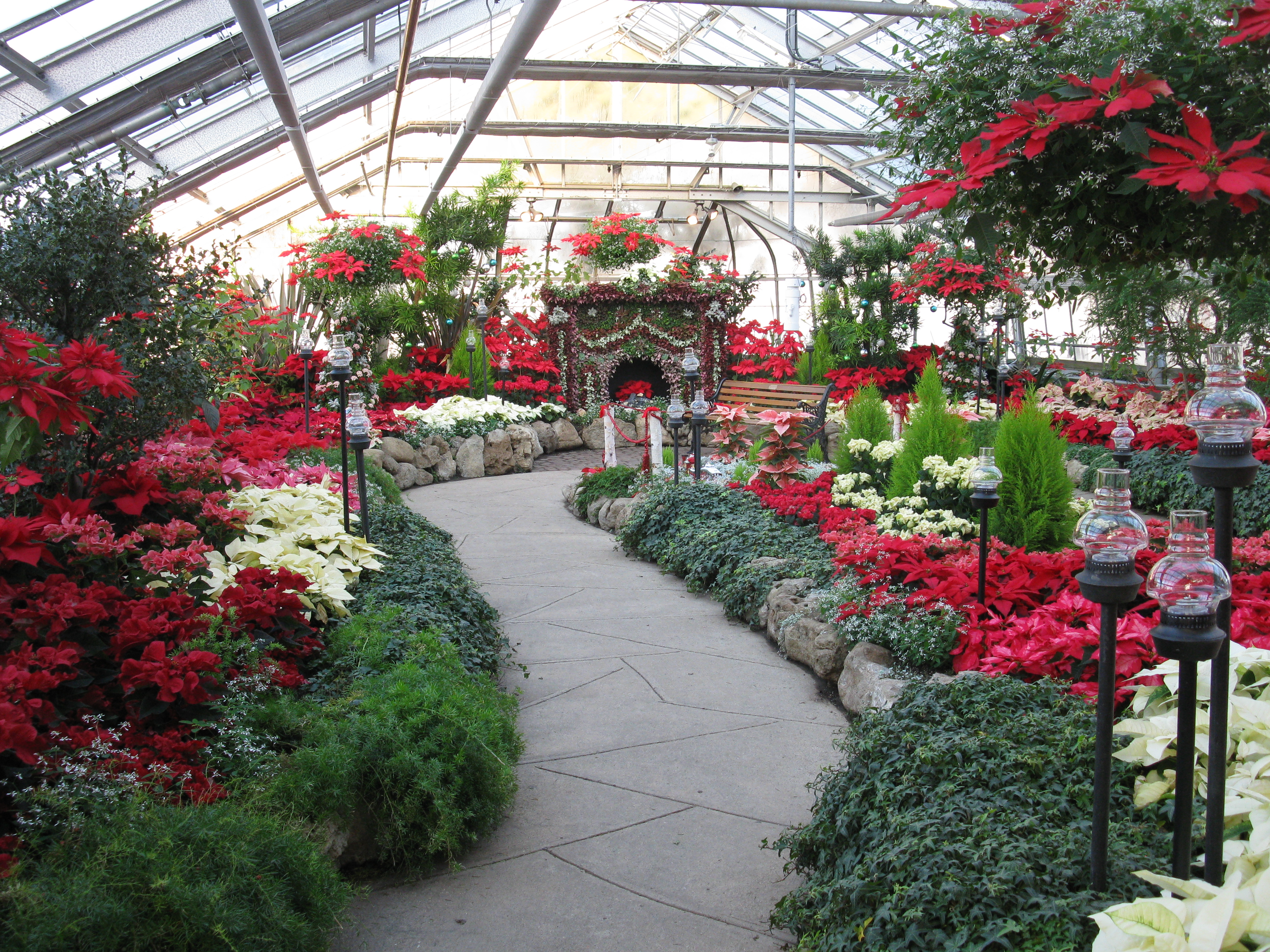
- 2010 Christmas Show at the Conservatory

- Location within Toronto
- Interactive map of Centennial Park Conservatory
- Type: Conservatory
- Location: 151 Elmcrest Road; Toronto, Ontario; M9C 3S2
- Coordinates: 43°38′58″N 79°35′18″W
- Created: 1969
- Operator: City of Toronto
- Open: 10 am to 5 pm daily

Centennial Park Conservatory is a conservatory in Toronto, Ontario, Canada. It consists of three greenhouses and 12,000 square feet (1,100 m^{2}) of plants including a cactus house, a tropical house and a show house which features seasonal displays. It is located in Centennial Park, in the former City of Etobicoke. This conservatory is cared for by Toronto Parks who also run Allan Gardens. Admission is free.

== Seasonal shows ==
The highlight is the Christmas show which opens the second Sunday of December with Christmas carollers, cookies, and hot apple cider. In December many different poinsettias are displayed, from white to red to dark purple. The Japanese chrysanthemum show occurs the first Sunday in November. The spring show at Easter features hyacinths, tulips, hydrangeas, and Easter lilies.

== Gallery ==
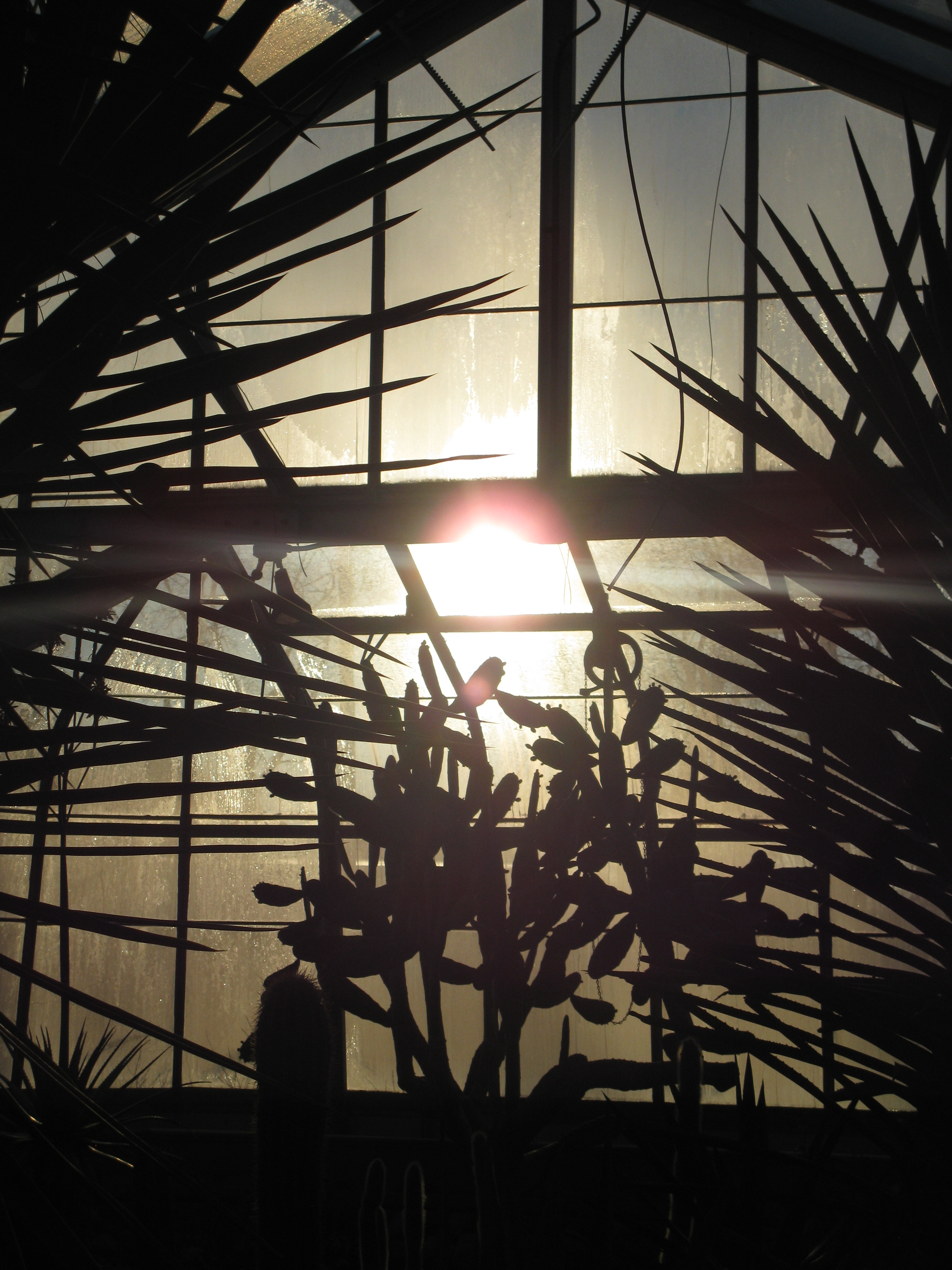
Cactus House

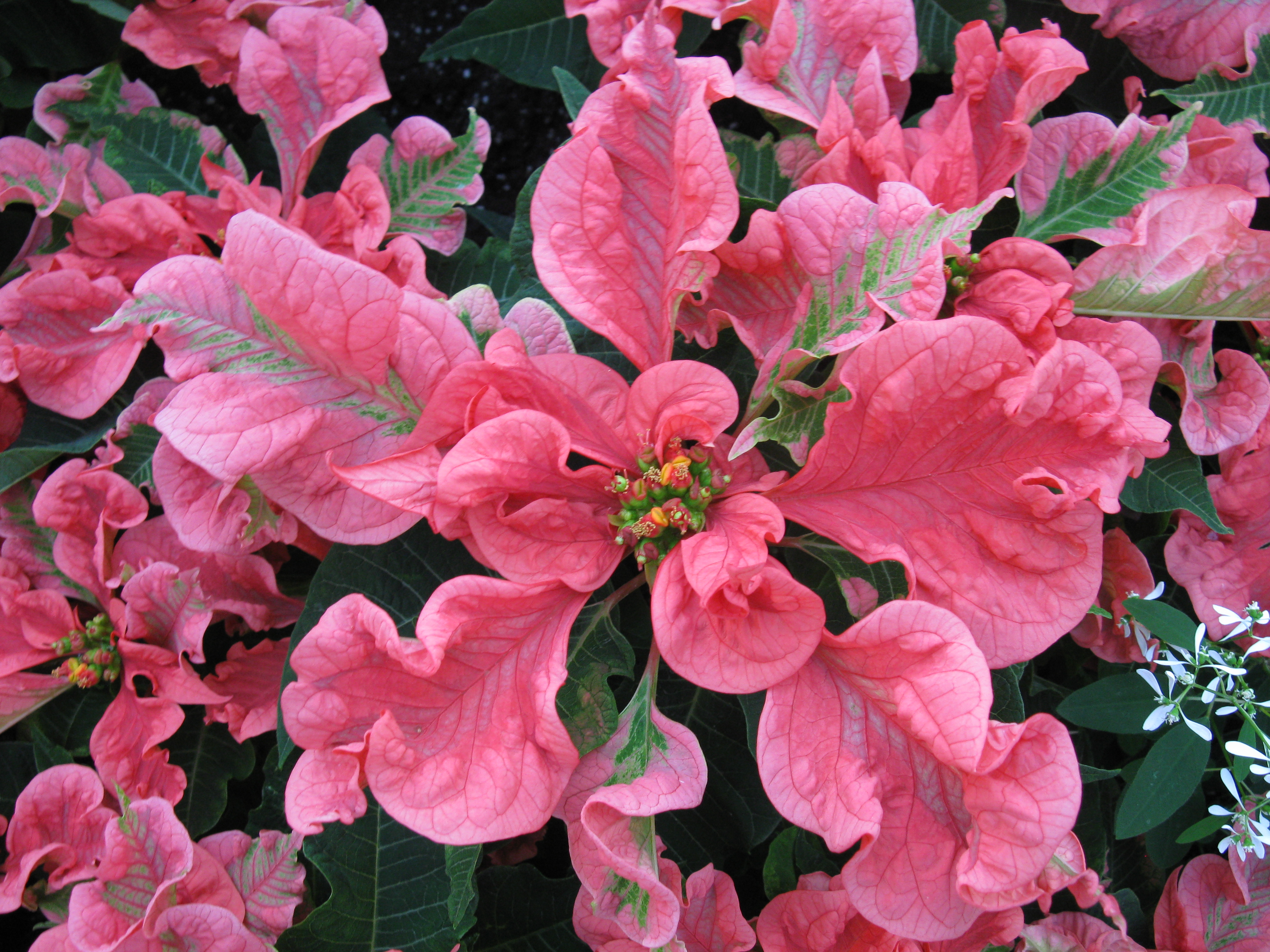
Poinsettia

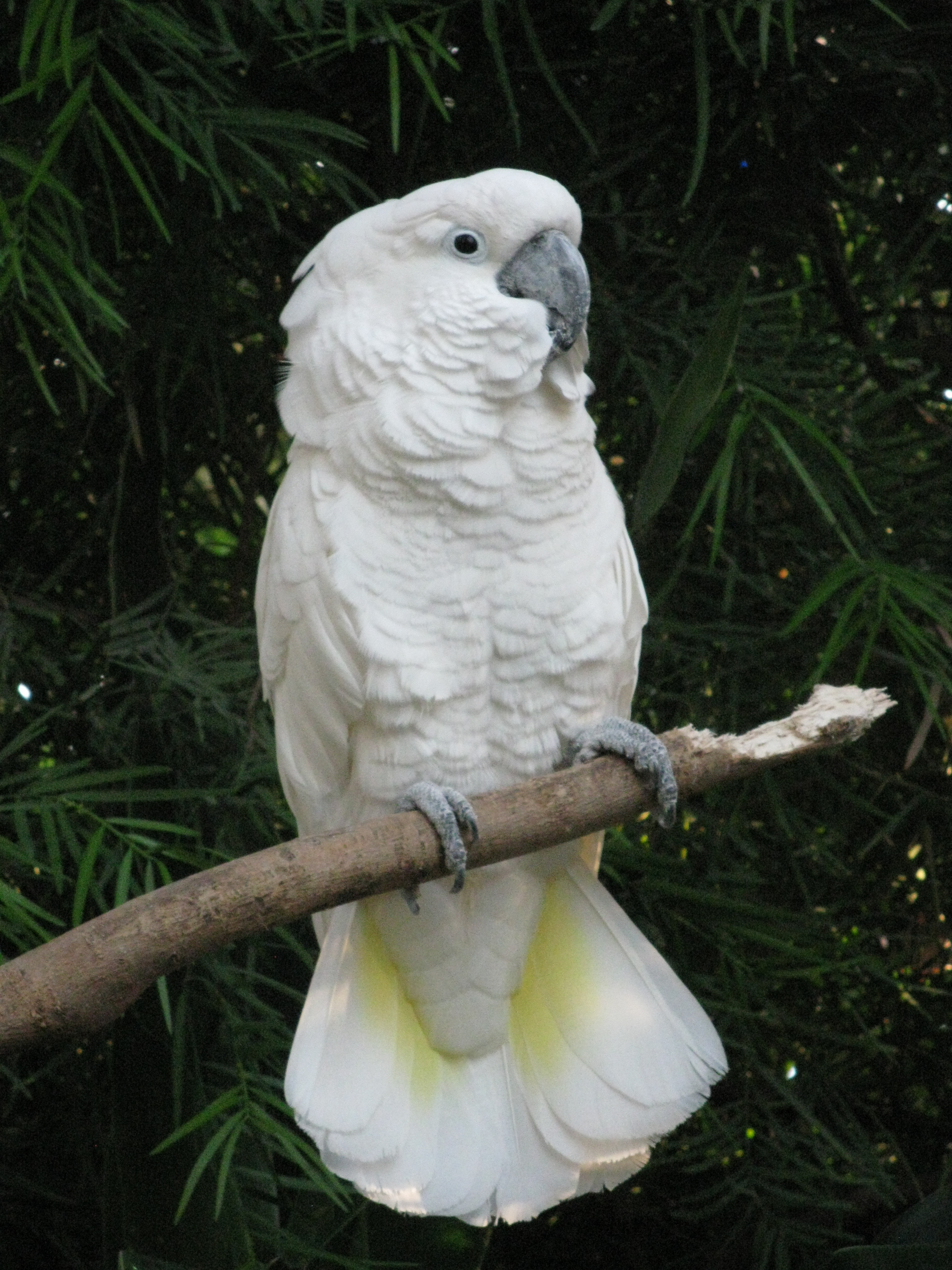
Angel, the late resident Cockatoo

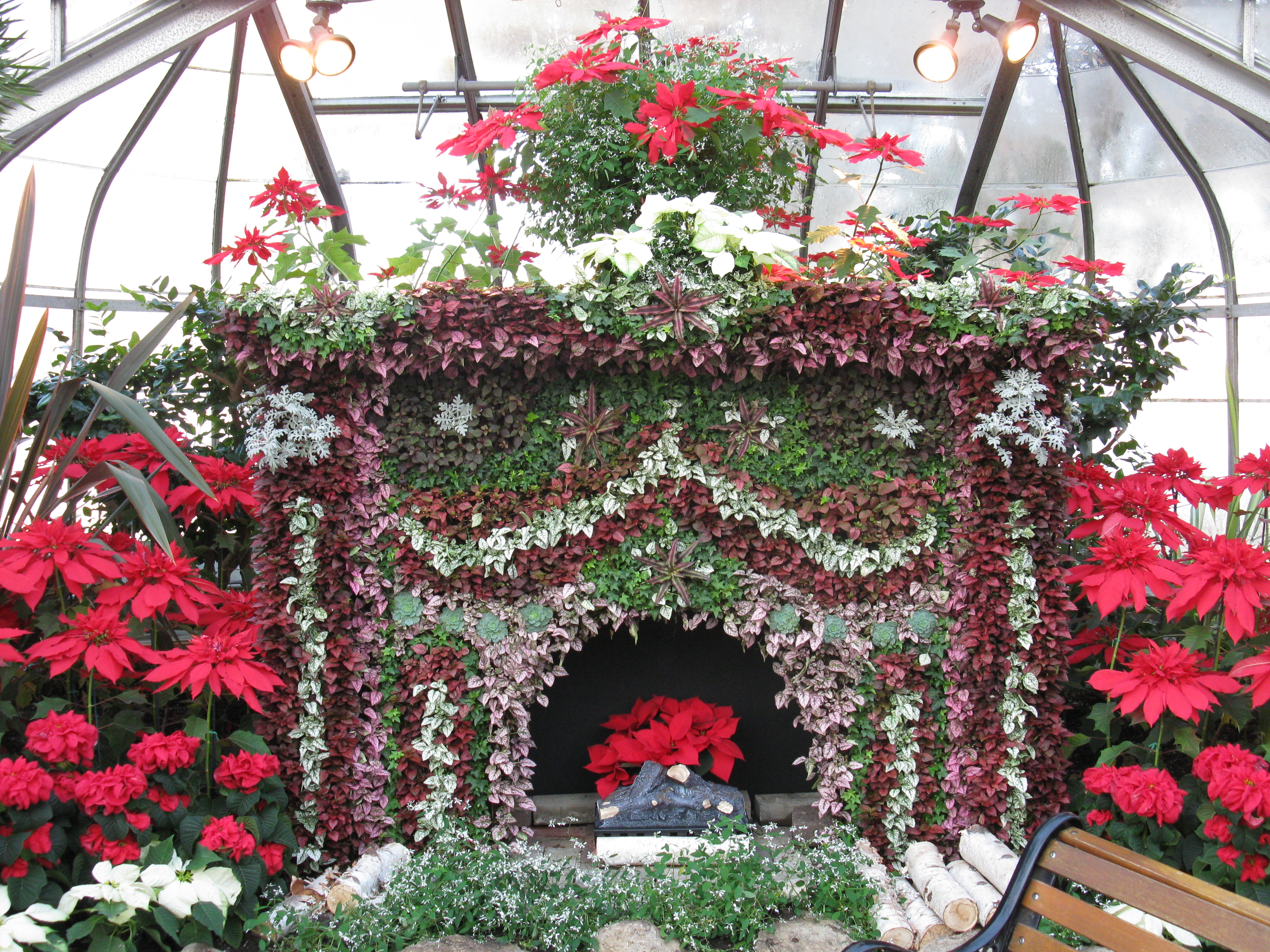
Fireplace topiary made of hypoestes, ivy, echevaria and dusty miller

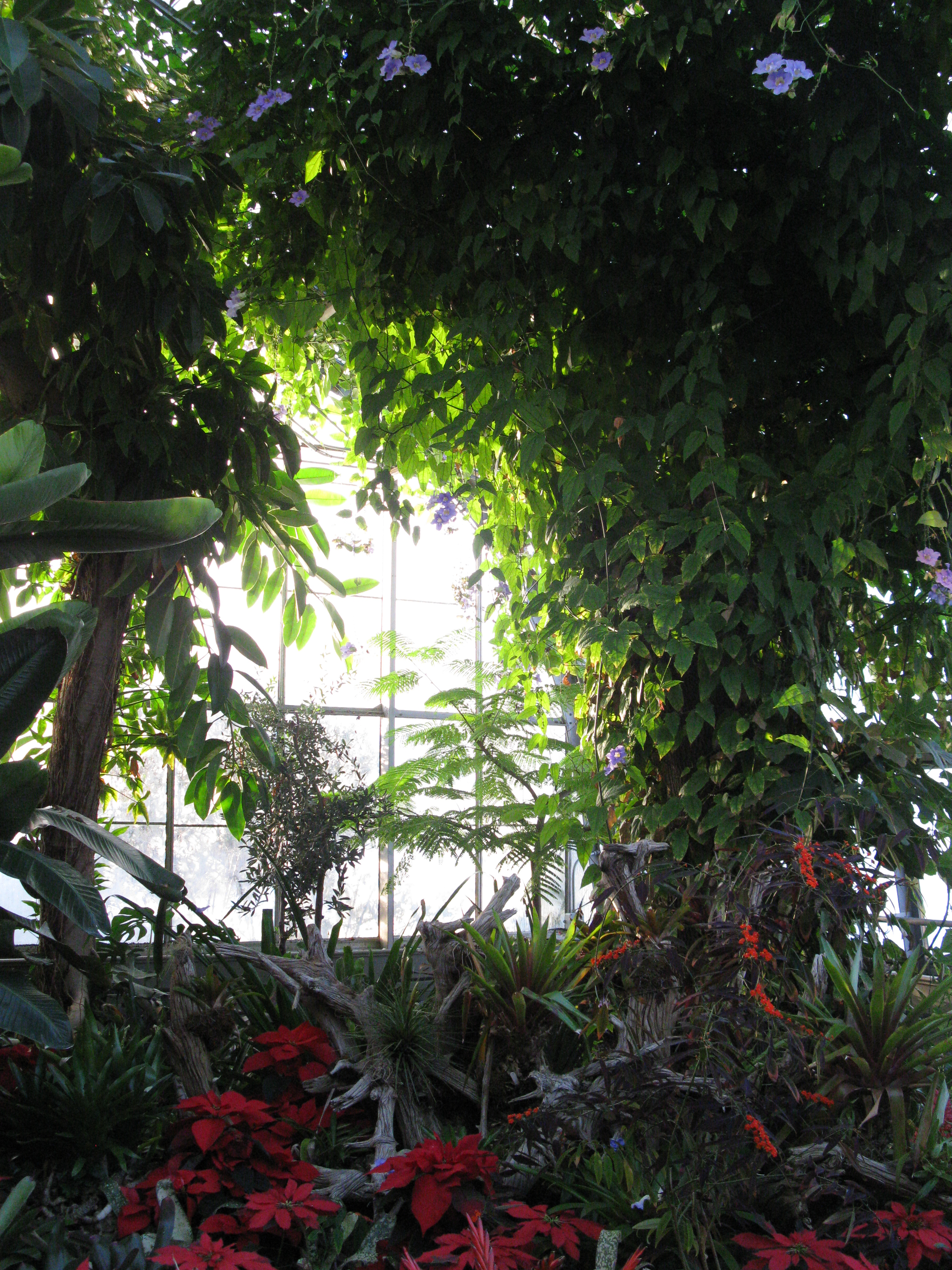

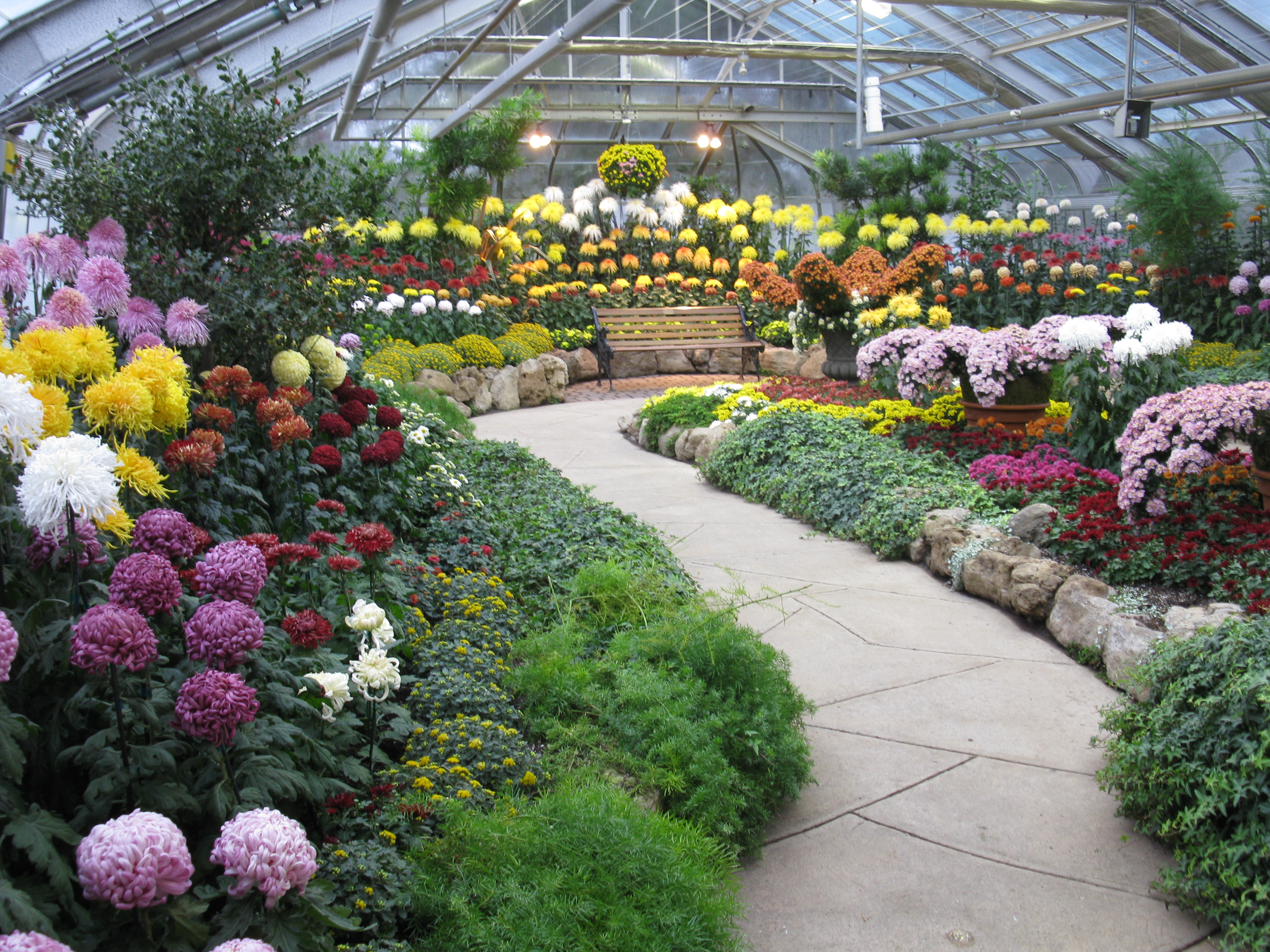
The Fall Chrysanthemum Show

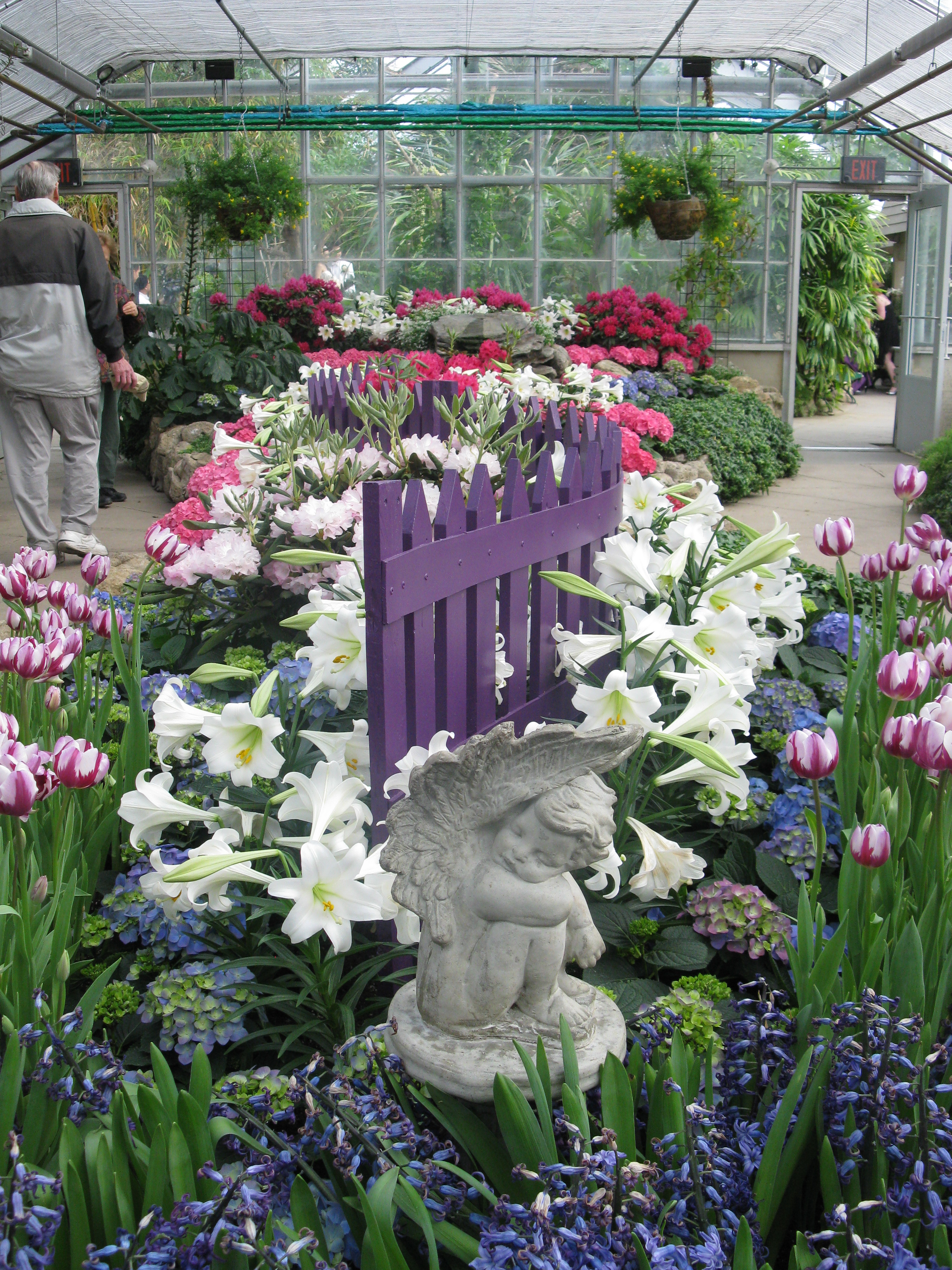
Spring Show at Centennial Park Conservatory
