= Wheelchair fencing at the 1980 Summer Paralympics =

Wheelchair fencing at the VI Paralympic Games
- Paralympic Wheelchair fencing

Wheelchair fencing at the 1980 Summer Paralympics consisted of seventeen events.

== Medal summary ==
=== Men's events ===
Event	Gold	Silver	Bronze
Épée individual 1C-3	Mohamed Benamar; France	Terry Willett; Great Britain	Massimo Penna; Italy
Épée individual 4–5	Christian Lachaud; France	Dieter Leicht; West Germany	Arthur Bellance; France
Épée team	France (FRA)	Great Britain (GBR)	West Germany (FRG)
Foil individual 2–3	Hans-Joachim Bohm; West Germany	Andre Hennaert; France	Mohamed Benamar; France
Foil individual 4–5	Arthur Bellance; France	Dieter Leicht; West Germany	Aimé Planchon; France
Foil novice individual	Giulio Martelli; Italy	Alain Siclis; France	Jean-Claude Coralie; France
Foil team	France (FRA)	West Germany (FRG)	Great Britain (GBR); John Clark; Mike Kelly; Howard Wardle
Sabre individual 2–3	Mike Kelly; Great Britain	Terry Willett; Great Britain	Hans-Joachim Bohm; West Germany
Sabre individual 4–5	Christian Lachaud; France	Aimé Planchon; France	Ronny Waterbley; Belgium
Sabre team	France (FRA); Jean-Claude Coralie; Andre Hennaert; Christian Lachaud; Aimé Planchon	Great Britain (GBR); Mike Kelly; Tom Killin; Howard Wardle; Terry Willett	Italy (ITA); Vittorio Loi; Renzo Molinari; Germano Pecchenino; Oliver Venturi

=== Women's events ===
Event	Gold	Silver	Bronze
Foil individual 2–3	Ayala Malchan; Israel	Therese Lemoine; France	Hemda Levy; Israel
Foil individual 4–5	Josette Bourgain; France	Monique Siclis; France	Margalit Peretz; Israel
Foil novice individual	Osanna Brugnoli; Italy	M. den Uyl; Netherlands	M. Tichelaar; Netherlands
Foil team	France (FRA); Josette Bourgain; Therese Lemoine; Monique Siclis	Israel (ISR); Hemda Levy; Ayala Malchan; Margalit Peretz; Rachel Tassa	Italy (ITA); Gabriella Bareggie; Irene Monaco; Rosa Sicari

=== Mixed events ===
Event	Gold	Silver	Bronze
Foil individual 1A	Paolo D'Agostini; Italy	Philip Wouters; Belgium	Maggie McLellan; Great Britain
Foil individual 1B	Rosa Sicari; Italy	Bruno Paganelli; Italy	None
Foil individual 1C	Guenter Spiess; West Germany	Aldo Licciardi; Italy	Jean-Pierre Leroux; France
