= Wheelchair fencing at the 1976 Summer Paralympics =

Wheelchair fencing at the V Paralympic Games
- Paralympic Wheelchair fencing
- Venue: Centennial Park West Arena

Wheelchair fencing at the 1976 Summer Paralympics consisted of fourteen events, ten for men and four for women. The competition was held at the Centennial Park West Arena in Toronto, Ontario, Canada.

== Medal summary ==
=== Men's events ===
Event	Gold	Silver	Bronze
Épée individual 2-3	Terry Willett; Great Britain	Mohamed Benamar; France	Giuliano Koten; Italy
Épée individual 4-5	Pierre Prestat; France	Cyril Thomas; Great Britain	John Clark; Great Britain
Épée team 2-5	France (FRA); Mohamed Benamar; Christian Lachaud; Pierre Prestat; Herbert Sok	Great Britain (GBR); John Clark; M. Kelly; Cyril Thomas; Terry Willett	Italy (ITA); Giuliano Koten; Vittorio Loi; Roberto Marson; Oliver Venturi
Foil individual 2-3	Hans-Joachim Bohm; West Germany	Vittorio Loi; Italy	Vincent Ross; Great Britain
Foil individual 4-5	Dieter Leicht; West Germany	Aimé Planchon; France	Herbert Sok; France
Foil novice individual	Christian Lachaud; France	Marc Toper; France	H. Wardle; Great Britain
Foil novice team	West Germany (FRG); Hans-Joachim Bohm; Juhlke; Dieter Leicht	France (FRA); Christian Lachaud; Aimé Planchon; Marc Toper	Italy (ITA); Giovanni Ferraris; Giuliano Koten; Vittorio Loi
Sabre individual 2-3	Andre Hennaert; France	Mike Kelly; Great Britain	Frank Jespers; Belgium
Sabre individual 2-3	Andre Hennaert; France	Mike Kelly; Great Britain	Terry Willett; Great Britain
Sabre individual 4-5	Cyril Thomas; Great Britain	Pierre Prestat; France	Aimé Planchon; France
Sabre team 2-5	France (FRA); Andre Hennaert; Aimé Planchon; Pierre Prestat	Great Britain (GBR); Mike Kelly; Cyril Thomas; Terry Willett	None

=== Women's events ===
Event	Gold	Silver	Bronze
Foil individual 2-3	Janet Swann; Great Britain	Alice Verhee; Belgium	Ayala Malchan; Israel
Foil individual 4-5	Josette Merckx; France	Rachel Tassa; Israel	Carol Bryant; Great Britain
Foil novice individual	Martine Favarcq; France	Winckelmann; West Germany	None
Foil novice team	Israel (ISR); Ayala Malchan; Margalit Peretz; Chemda Shevach	France (FRA); Martine Favarcq; Josette Merckx; Maguy Ramousse	Great Britain (GBR); Valerie Robertson; Janet Swann; Phyllis Waller
