= Rosa Sicari =

Italian paralympian

Personal information
- Born: 1948 Taurianova, Italy
- Died: 2007 (aged 58–59)

Sport
- Sport: Paralympic athletics Paralympic swimming Para table tennis Wheelchair fencing
Medal record
Representing Italy
Paralympic Games
Gold medal – first place	1972 Heidelberg	Singles 1B
Gold medal – first place	1980 Arnhem	Individual foil 1B
Bronze medal – third place	1976 Toronto	60m 1B
Bronze medal – third place	1976 Toronto	Slalom 1B
Bronze medal – third place	1976 Toronto	25m freestyle 1B
Bronze medal – third place	1976 Toronto	Singles 1B
Bronze medal – third place	1980 Arnhem	Slalom 1B
Bronze medal – third place	1980 Arnhem	Singles 1B
Bronze medal – third place	1980 Arnhem	Foil team

Rosa Sicari (1948 – 2007) was an Italian Paralympian who competed in track and field, swimming and table tennis. She was one of the first athletes from Calabria to compete at the Paralympic Games.

She competed at the 1972 Summer Paralympics winning a gold medal in table tennis, and bronze medal, 1976 Summer Paralympics, and 1980 Summer Paralympics, winning a bronze medal in table tennis.

== See also ==
- Paralympic sports
- Sport in Italy
