= Earl Bales Park =

Park in Toronto, Ontario, Canada

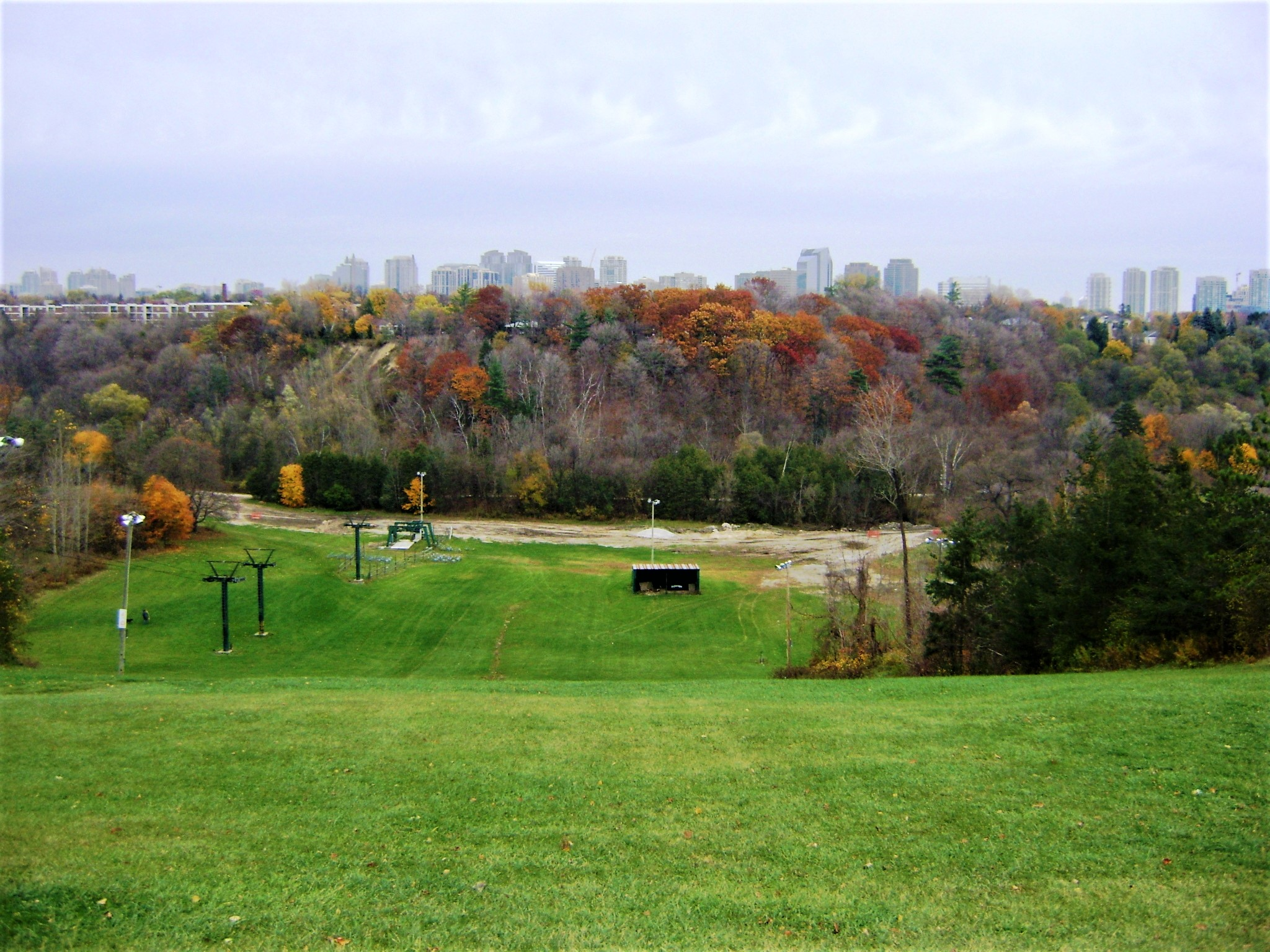
- Interactive map of Earl Bales Park
- Location: 4169 Bathurst Street
- Coordinates: 43.75336°N 79.43368°W
- Area: 127 acres (51 ha)
- Created: 1969-1975
- Operator: Toronto Parks
- Open: 1975
- Website: Earl Bales Park

Earl Bales Park is a large park in Toronto, Ontario, Canada. The West Don River runs through it. It was named after Robert Earl Bales, a former reeve of the North York township. The park contains a ski centre, community centre, dog park, amphitheatre and a Holocaust memorial, The Canadian Society for Yad Vashem Holocaust Memorial Site. There are many forested trails going through the park, as well as a 3.2 hectares (7.9 acres) stormwater management pond.

== History ==
The 51 hectares (130 acres) park was built on farm land owned by John Bales, which later became York Downs Golf and Country Club in 1922. The land was saved from development after the sale of the club which relocated in 1969 to Unionville, Ontario and was turned into an urban park in 1975. Don Valley Golf Course is located to the east and south of the park.

John Bales House, which dates back to 1824, was used as the greenskeeper's home from 1922 to 1969.

The park is named for former Reeve of North York Township (1934-1940) Robert Earl Bales (and great-grandson of John Bales).

== Services ==
Besides being a city park, it is also home to:

- North York Ski Centre
- Barry Zukerman Amphitheatre
- Earl Bales Community Centre
- Spirit of Bravery Statue

== North York Ski Centre ==
North York Ski Centre
- Interactive map of North York Ski Centre
- Location: Toronto, Ontario, Canada
- Coordinates: 43°45′14″N 79°25′47.20″W
- Night skiing: yes
- Website: Earl Bales Ski & Snowboard Centre

North York Ski Centre (also known as the Earl Bales Ski & Snowboard Centre) is a small alpine skiing hill located in Earl Bales Park, close to the intersection of Bathurst Street and Sheppard Avenue in Toronto. It features one quad chair and a rope tow, serving three intermediate slopes and one beginner slope. It is now the only alpine skiing centre located within the boundaries of Toronto, after the closure of Centennial Park in 2022. The hills are a natural formation from the edge of the Don River.

In 2011 and 2012, repeated failures of the now-retired double chair brought up talks of closing the centre. Instead, the city decided to revitalize the club by adding a quad chair. The double chair is still in place but is unused.

== Roads ==
The park has one named road, Raoul Wallenberg Road, named after Raoul Wallenberg, which connects Bathurst Street with the parking lot at the Earl Bales Community Centre. The park also has one unnamed road connecting Raoul Wallenberg road with the ski hill parking lots as well as many trails running in the forest.

== See also ==
- List of Toronto parks
- Beaver Valley Ski Club
