= Moshe Levy (athlete) =

Israeli Paralympic champion

Personal information
- Native name: משה לוי
- Born: 1952 (age 73–74)
Medal record
Representing Israel
Paralympic Games
Men's para swimming
Gold medal – first place	1968 Tel Aviv	50m backstroke 4
Gold medal – first place	1972 Heidelberg	3X50m medley
Gold medal – first place	1976 Toronto	3X50m medley relay
Gold medal – first place	1976 Toronto	4X50m freestyle relay
Gold medal – first place	1976 Toronto	4X100m medley relay
Gold medal – first place	1976 Toronto	50m backstroke 3
Gold medal – first place	1968 Tel Aviv	3X50m medley relay
Silver medal – second place	1976 Toronto	25m butterfly 3
Bronze medal – third place	1972 Heidelberg	50m backstroke 4
Bronze medal – third place	1976 Toronto	3X25m individual medley
Men's wheelchair basketball
Gold medal – first place	1980 Arnhem	Wheelchair basketball
Silver medal – second place	1972 Heidelberg	Wheelchair basketball
Silver medal – second place	1976 Toronto	Wheelchair basketball

Moshe Levy (Hebrew: משה לוי; born 1952) is an Israeli paralympic champion.

Levy was born in Israel in 1952 and contracted polio as a young baby. In 1962 he began practicing at the Israel Sports Center for the Disabled, focusing on swimming and wheelchair basketball. That same year he attended for the first time the competition for swimming across the Sea of Galilee, in which he later took part for 13 consecutive years.

Over the years Levy participated in various international competitions, including seven Paralympic Games. He won 6 paralympic medals as an individual and 7 more in swimming relay teams and as a member of the Israeli wheelchair basketball team.

In later years Levy remains active in sports and plays at "Kessem" basketball team, operated by an organization for promotion of paralympic sports. In 2003 - 2004 he coached his team.

He married paralympic athlete Chemda Levy.
