= Wheelchair fencing at the 1988 Summer Paralympics =

Wheelchair fencing at the VIII Paralympic Games
- Paralympic Wheelchair fencing
- Venue: SK Olympic Handball Gymnasium
- Dates: 18 to 23 October

Paralympic symbol (1988-1994)

Wheelchair fencing at the 1988 Summer Paralympics consisted of fourteen events, nine for men and five for women.

== Medal table ==
Rank	Nation	Gold	Silver	Bronze	Total
1	France (FRA)	7	4	3	14
2	South Korea (KOR)	3	1	0	4
3	Italy (ITA)	2	3	4	9
4	West Germany (FRG)	1	3	1	5
5	Great Britain (GBR)	1	0	2	3
6	Hong Kong (HKG)	0	2	2	4
7	Kuwait (KUW)	0	1	1	2
8	Israel (ISR)	0	0	1	1
Totals (8 entries)		14	14	14	42

== Medal summary ==
=== Men's events ===
Event	Gold	Silver	Bronze
Épée 1C–3	Luigi Zonghi; Italy	Soriano Ceccanti; Italy	Sik Lau; Hong Kong
Épée 4–6	Robert Citerne; France	Habib A.S. Ahmad; Kuwait	Wilfried Lipinski; West Germany
Team épée	West Germany (FRG); Uwe Bartmann; Dieter Leicht; Wilfried Lipinski	France (FRA); Arthur Bellance; Serge Besseiche; Robert Citerne	Italy (ITA); Soriano Ceccanti; Ernesto Lerre; Carlo Loa; Luigi Zonghi
Foil 1C–3	Il Joo Choi; South Korea	Soon Ki Jang; South Korea	Andre Hennaert; France
Foil 4–6	Arthur Bellance; France	Wolfgang Kempf; West Germany	Habib A.S. Ahmad; Kuwait
Team foil	France (FRA); Arthur Bellance; Andre Hennaert; Yvon Pacault	West Germany (FRG); Wolfgang Kempf; Dieter Leicht; Guenter Spiess	Italy (ITA); Giuseppe Alfieri; Soriano Ceccanti; Umberto Mastrofini; Luigi Zonghi
Sabre 1C–3	Tae Hoon Park; South Korea	Pascal Durand; France	Andre Hennaert; France
Sabre 4–6	Kyung Soo Roh; South Korea	Yvon Pacault; France	Cyril Thomas; Great Britain
Team sabre	France (FRA); Pascal Durand; Andre Hennaert; Yvon Pacault	West Germany (FRG); Wolfgang Kempf; Wilfried Lipinski; Reinhold Maus; Guenter Spiess	Italy (ITA); Giuseppe Alfieri; Ernesto Lerre; Umberto Mastrofini; Pierino Scarsella

=== Women's events ===
Event	Gold	Silver	Bronze
Épée 1C–3	Jannick Seveno; France	Mariella Bertini; Italy	Shuk Han Yuen; Hong Kong
Épée 4–6	Carol Walton; Great Britain	Ying Wong; Hong Kong	Suzannah Rockett; Great Britain
Foil 1C–3	Murielle Desmarets; France	Shuk Han Yuen; Hong Kong	Jannick Seveno; France
Foil 4–6	Laura Presutto; Italy	Therese Lemoine; France	Rossana Giarrizzo; Italy
Team foil	France (FRA); Sabbah Aoutar; Murielle Desmarets; Therese Lemoine; Jannick Seveno	Italy (ITA); Mariella Bertini; Rossana Giarrizzo; Laura Presutto	Israel (ISR); Chemda Levy; Ayala Malhan-Katz; Margalit Peretz; Rachel Said
