= Wheelchair basketball at the 1988 Summer Paralympics =

Wheelchair basketball at the VIII Paralympic Games
- Paralympic Wheelchair Basketball
- Venue: Jamsil Students' Gymnasium (finals) and Jamsil Arena

Medalists
1st place, gold medalist(s)		United States (USA) (men); United States (USA) (women)
2nd place, silver medalist(s)		Netherlands (NED) (men); West Germany (FRG) (women)
3rd place, bronze medalist(s)		France (FRA) (men); Netherlands (NED) (women)

Paralympic symbol (1988-1994)

Wheelchair basketball at the 1988 Summer Paralympics consisted of men's and women's team events.

At the 1988 Games, Les Autres sportspeople were not eligible to participate in wheelchair basketball.

== Medal summary ==
Event	Gold	Silver	Bronze
Men's team	United States (USA) Curtis Bell; Albert Campos; David Efferson; David Paul Kiley; Joe Manni; Ed Owen; Mike Schlappi; Rick St. John; Anardo Valdez; Darryl Waller; Rod Williams; Gary Woodring	Netherlands (NED) Frans van Breugel; Bob van den Broek; Jan Dijs; Servaas Kamerling; Hubertus Klerks; Henk Makkenze; Rene Martens; Erik Mink; Frits Streyl; Harry Venema; Friedrich Wiegmann	France (FRA) Philippe Baye; Eric Benault; Lionel Chavanne; Michel Gradelle; Jean-Luc Granzotto; Marc Guillemain; Michel Mench; Philippe Nuttin; Fabrice Pointin; Jean-Yves Regnault; Jean Reignier; Alain Trolong
Women's team	United States (USA) Cathy Cain; Terri Goodknight; Susie Grimes; Susan Hagel; Sharon Hedrick; Sharon McCarthy; Mary Ann O'Neil; Rosanne Poche; Pam Stewart; Deborah Sunderman; Barbara Yoss	West Germany (FRG) Rita Breuer; Liesel Broeckerhoff; Angelika Gerstmeier; Heidi Kirste; Rita Laux; Michaela Richter; Jutta Saggau; Martina Tschoetschel; Britt Tuna; Bettina Watz	Netherlands (NED) Yvonne Broersma-Schaefer; Jorien Buurman; Neeltje van Es; Theodora de Haan; Jolanda Kok; Guda van der Laan; Christina Makkes-Klok; Jozima Mosely; Francisca de Rijk; Marijke Ruiter; Maaike Smit; Ingeborg Tiggelman

Source: Paralympic.org

== See also ==
- Basketball at the 1988 Summer Olympics
