= Terri Goodknight =

American paralympic athlete

Sport
- Country: United States
- Sport: Paralympic athletics Wheelchair basketball
Medal record
Wheelchair basketball
Representing United States
Paralympic Games
Gold medal – first place	1988 Seoul	Women's tournament

Terri Goodknight is an American Paralympic athlete and wheelchair basketball player. She won a gold medal at the 1988 Summer Paralympics.

== Life ==
She graduated from Urbana High School, and University of Illinois Urbana-Champaign.

== Career ==
At the 1992 Summer Paralympics, she competed in Women's 200 meters TW3, Women's 400 meters TW3, and Women's 100 meters TW3 finishing tenth.

At the 1998 Summer Paralympics, in Seoul, she competed in Wheelchair Basketball, winning a gold medal.
