= Shaaban Sakhafi =

Israeli Paralympic competitor

Personal information
- Native name: שעבן סקחפי
- Born: 1961
- Died: 1985 (aged 23–24)
Medal record
Representing Israel
Paralympic Games
Men's wheelchair basketball
Gold medal – first place	1980 Arnhem	Wheelchair basketball

Shaaban Sakhafi (Hebrew: שעבן סקחפי, Arabic: شعبان سكحفي; 1961 - 11 July 1985) was an Israeli Paralympic wheelchair basketball player and a sportsman in disabled sports. He was the first Arab to represent Israel in the Paralympic Games, in 1980.

== Career ==
At the 1975 national championship for para swimming, Sakhafi won three medals: gold in the 50 metre backstroke event, gold in the 50 metre front crawl event and a silver medal in the 50 metre breaststroke event.

Sakhafi was a member of Israel Sports Center for the Disabled and in 1979 won the first snooker tournament held at the center.

At the 1979 national championship for para table tennis, he ranked first place for disability class 2.

Sakhafi was a member of Israel men's national wheelchair basketball team and took part in the basketball tournaments at the 1980 Summer Paralympics and the 1984 Summer Paralympics. In 1980, the Israeli team ranked first and achieved the gold medal.

On 11 July 1985 Sakhafi was electrocuted in his work place and died at the age of 24. The ILAN basketball team of Jaffa was renamed ILAN Shaaban Jaffa in his memory.
