= David Barefoot =

Canadian Paralympic archer

Medal record

Representing Canada

Paralympic Games

Archery
Gold medal – first place	1984 New York / Stoke Mandeville	Men's Double FITA Round C1

David "Shoeless Joe" Barefoot is a paralympic athlete from Canada competing mainly in category C1 events.

David competed in the 1984 Summer Paralympics in archery, athletics and boccia. In Archery he won the gold in Men's Double FITA Round C1.
