= France at the Paralympics =

- IPC code: FRA
- NPC: French Paralympic and Sports Committee
- Website: france-paralympique.fr
- Medals Ranked 5th: Gold 449 Silver 451 Bronze 465 Total 1,365

Summer appearances
- 1960; 1964; 1968; 1972; 1976; 1980; 1984; 1988; 1992; 1996; 2000; 2004; 2008; 2012; 2016; 2020; 2024

Winter appearances
- 1976; 1980; 1984; 1988; 1992; 1994; 1998; 2002; 2006; 2010; 2014; 2018; 2022; 2026

France participated in the inaugural Paralympic Games in 1960 in Rome, and has taken part in every edition of the Summer and Winter Paralympics since then. France was the host country of the 1992 Winter Paralympics and the 2024 Summer Paralympics.

French athletes have won a total of 1,263 medals at the Paralympic Games, of which 416 is gold, placing France fourth on the all-time Paralympic Games medal table.

Among its most successful competitors is swimmer Béatrice Hess, winner of 20 gold medals.

== Medal tables ==
Red border color indicates host nation status.

=== Medals by Summer Games ===
Games	Gold	Silver	Bronze	Total	Rank by Gold medals	Rank by Total medals
(Italy) 1960 Rome	3	3	1	7	9	9
(Japan) 1964 Tokyo	4	2	5	11	11	12
(Israel) 1968 Tel-Aviv	13	10	9	32	5	8
(Germany) 1972 Heidelberg	10	8	15	33	7	7
(Canada) 1976 Toronto	23	21	14	58	8	8
(Netherlands) 1980 Arnhem	28	26	31	85	8	8
(United States) 1984 New York (United Kingdom) 1984 Stoke Mandeville	71	69	46	186	6	6
(South Korea) 1988 Seoul	46	44	50	140	5	5
(Spain) 1992 Barcelona-Madrid	36	36	34	106	6	6
(United States) 1996 Atlanta	35	29	31	95	6	6
(Australia) 2000 Sydney	30	28	28	86	7	7
(Greece) 2004 Athens	18	26	30	74	9	6
(China) 2008 Beijing	12	21	19	52	12	9
(United Kingdom) 2012 London	8	19	18	45	16	8
(Brazil) 2016 Rio de Janeiro	9	5	14	28	12	15
(Japan) 2020 Tokyo	11	15	28	54	14	10
(France) 2024 Paris	19	28	28	75	8	6
(United States) 2028 Los Angeles	Future event					
(Australia) 2032 Brisbane	Future event					
Total	376	390	401	1167	6	5

=== Medals by Winter Games ===
Games	Gold	Silver	Bronze	Total	Rank by Gold medals	Rank by Total medals
(Sweden) 1976 Örnsköldsvik	2	0	3	5	8	7
(Norway) 1980 Geilo	1	1	1	3	9	9
(Austria) 1984 Innsbruck	4	2	0	6	8	11
(Austria) 1988 Innsbruck	5	5	3	13	7	8
(France) 1992 Tignes-Albertville	6	4	9	19	6	5
(Norway) 1994 Lillehammer	14	6	11	31	4	5
(Japan) 1998 Nagano	5	9	8	22	10	8
(United States) 2002 Salt Lake City	2	11	6	19	13	5
(Italy) 2006 Turin	7	2	6	15	4	4
(Canada) 2010 Vancouver	1	4	1	6	10	12
(Russia) 2014 Sochi	5	3	4	12	6	7
(South Korea) 2018 Pyeongchang	7	8	5	20	4	5
(China) 2022 Beijing	7	3	2	12	4	7
(Italy) 2026 Milan-Cortina	4	4	4	12	6	7
(France) 2030 French Alps	Future event					
Total	70	62	63	195	7	9

=== Medals by summer sport ===
Leading in that sport

Sport	Gold	Silver	Bronze	Total
Swimming	121	114	114	349
Athletics	74	88	78	240
Wheelchair fencing	62	43	40	145
Table tennis	36	46	59	141
Road cycling	21	16	18	55
Archery	16	11	12	39
Weightlifting	8	18	9	35
Shooting	7	12	15	34
Track cycling	7	6	10	23
Powerlifting	5	8	2	15
Judo	4	9	14	27
Wheelchair tennis	3	4	7	14
Paratriathlon	3	1	3	7
Badminton	3	1	1	5
Sailing	2	2	0	4
Dartchery	1	1	2	4
Football 5-a-side	1	1	0	2
Lawn bowls	1	0	5	6
Wheelchair basketball	1	0	3	4
Boccia	1	0	0	1
Rowing	0	2	5	7
Paracanoeing	0	2	3	5
Equestrian	0	1	1	2
Parataekwondo	0	1	0	1
Volleyball	0	0	1	1
Totals (25 entries)	377	387	402	1,166

=== Medals by winter sport ===
Leading in that sport

Sport	Gold	Silver	Bronze	Total
Alpine skiing	44	46	38	128
Cross-country skiing	15	10	20	45
Biathlon	8	5	4	17
Snowboarding	3	1	1	5
Totals (4 entries)	70	62	63	195

Best results in non-medaling sports:

Summer
Sport	Rank	Athlete	Event & Year
Goalball	7th	France men's team	Men's tournament in 2024
Wheelchair rugby	5th	France mixed team	Mixed tournament in 2024
Winter
Sport	Rank	Athlete	Event & Year
Para ice hockey	did not participate		
Wheelchair curling	did not participate		

== Multi-medalists ==
=== Summer Paralympics ===
==== Multiple medalists ====
This is a list of French athletes who have won at least three gold medals or five medals.

No.	Athlete	Sport	Years	Games	Gender	Gold	Silver	Bronze	Total
1	Béatrice Hess	Swimming	1984 - 2004	6	F	20	5	0	25
2	Assia El Hannouni	Athletics	2004 - 2012	3	F	8	2	0	10
3	Pascal Pinard	Swimming	1992 - 2004	4	M	7	5	6	18
4	Claude Issorat	Athletics	1992 - 2004	4	M	7	4	2	13
5	Mustapha Badid	Athletics	1984 - 1996	4	M	6	1	1	8
6	Robert Citerne	Wheelchair fencing	1988 - 2004	7	M	4	2	3	9

==== Multi medals in a single Games ====
This is a list of French athletes who have won at least two gold medals in a single Games. Ordered categorically by gold medals earned, sports then year.

No.	Athlete	Sport	Year	Gender	Gold	Silver	Bronze	Total
1	Pascal Pinard	Swimming	1992	M	5	1	2	8
2	Assia El Hannouni	Athletics	2004	F	4	0	0	4
3	Mustapha Badid	Athletics	1988	M	4	1	0	5
4	Claude Issorat	Athletics	1996	M	3	0	1	4

==== Multi medals in a single event ====
This is a list of French athletes who have won at least two gold medals in a single event at the Summer Paralympics. Ordered categorically by medals earned, sports then gold medals earned.

No.	Athlete	Sport	Event	Years	Games	Gender	Gold	Silver	Bronze	Total
1	Robert Citerne	Wheelchair fencing	Team épée	1988-2004	7	M	3	2	0	5
2	Charles Tolle	Athletics	4 × 400 m relay	1996-2000	2	M	2	0	0	2

==== Most appearances ====
This is a list of French athletes who have competed in four or more Summer Paralympic Games. Active athletes are in bold. Athletes who were under 15 years of age or over 40 years of age are in bold.

No.	Athlete	Sport	Birth Year	Games Years	First/Last Age	Gender	Gold	Silver	Bronze	Total
1	Robert Citerne	Wheelchair fencing	1961	1988 - 2004 (7)	27 - **43**	M	4	2	3	9
2	Béatrice Hess	Swimming	1961	1984 - 2004 (6)	22 - **42**	F	20	5	0	25
3	Vincent Boury	Table tennis	1969	1996 - 2012 (5)	30 - **43**	M	1	2	1	4
3	Pierre Fairbank	Athletics	1971	2000 - 2016 (5)	29 - **45**	M	1	2	4	7
3	Thu Kamkasomphou	Table tennis	1967	2000 - 2016 (5)	33 - **49**	F	2	2	4	8

== See also ==
- France at the Olympics
