= Wheelchair fencing at the 1984 Summer Paralympics =

Competitive sporting event

Wheelchair fencing at the VII Paralympic Games
- Paralympic Wheelchair fencing

Paralympic symbol (1988-1994)

Wheelchair fencing at the 1984 Summer Paralympics consisted of fifteen events, eleven for men and four for women.

== Medal summary ==
=== Men's events ===
Event	Gold	Silver	Bronze
Épée individual 2-3	Giulio Martelli; Italy	Hans-Joachim Bohm; West Germany	Mohamed Beldjilau; France
Épée individual 4-5	Wilfried Lipinski; West Germany	Arthur Bellance; France	Ahmad Habib Al-Saleh; Kuwait
Épée team	France (FRA)	West Germany (FRG)	Hong Kong (HKG); King Bor Cheung; Koon Tung Lau; Man Kee Lai; Sik Lau; Sze Kit Chan
Foil individual 1B	Santo Mangano; Italy	Fabio Bernagozzi; Italy	Barry Travis; Great Britain
Foil individual 1C	Guenter Spiess; West Germany	Jean-Pierre Leroux; France	
Foil individual 2-3	Andre Hennaert; France	Hans-Joachim Bohm; West Germany	
Foil individual 4-5	Arthur Bellance; France	Olivier Plane; France	John Clark; Great Britain
Foil team	France (FRA)	Italy (ITA); Giuseppe Alfieri; Giulio Martelli; Pierino Scarsella; Luigi Zonghi	Great Britain (GBR); John Clark; Kevin Davies; David Hickson; Jim Parkinson
Sabre individual 2-3	Andre Hennaert; France	Pierino Scarcella; Italy	Brian Dickinson; Great Britain
Sabre individual 4-5	Kevin Davies; Great Britain	Jason Aharoni; Israel	Ronny Waterbley; Belgium
Sabre team	France (FRA)	Italy (ITA); Giuseppe Alfieri; Pierino Scarsella de Benedettis	Great Britain (GBR); Kevin Davies; Brian Dickinson; Tom Killin; Terry Willett

=== Women's events ===
Event	Gold	Silver	Bronze
Foil individual 1C	Veronique Soetemondt; France		
Foil individual 2-3	Murielle Desmarets; France	Mariella Bertini; Italy	Jannick Seveno; France
Foil individual 4-5	Yuet Wah Fung; Hong Kong	Sylviane Meyer; France	Therese Lemoine; France
Foil team	France (FRA)	Israel (ISR): Chemda Levy; Ayala Katz; Margalit Peretz	Hong Kong (HKG); Yuet Wah Fung; Shuk Han Yuen; Anyette Chow
