= David Higgins (archer) =

Australian Paralympic archer (born 1968)

Personal information
- Full name: David P Higgins
- Nationality: Australia
- Born: 1968 (age 57–58) Bankstown, New South Wales
Medal record
Archery
Paralympic Games
Silver medal – second place	1984 New York/Stoke Mandeville	Men's Short metric round team 1A–6

David L. Higgins (born 16 February 1968) is an Australian Paralympic archery silver medalist. A paraplegic from the Lake Macquarie suburb of Eleebana, he started archery at the age of eleven and two years later he became the first paraplegic in Australia to qualify for a national championship in archery against able-bodied archers. He was Australia's youngest team member at the age of 16 at the 1984 New York/Stoke Mandeville Paralympics. He won a silver medal in the Men's Short Metric Round Team 1A–6 event and finished 7th in the Men's Double Advanced Metric Round Paraplegic event.
