= France at the 1988 Summer Paralympics =

- IPC code: FRA
- NPC: French Paralympic and Sports Committee
- Website: france-paralympique.fr

in Seoul
- Competitors: 116 in 12 sports
- Medals Ranked 5th: Gold 46 Silver 44 Bronze 50 Total 140

Summer Paralympics appearances (overview)
- 1960; 1964; 1968; 1972; 1976; 1980; 1984; 1988; 1992; 1996; 2000; 2004; 2008; 2012; 2016; 2020; 2024

France competed at the 1988 Summer Paralympics in Seoul, South Korea. 116 competitors from France won 140 medals including 46 gold, 44 silver and 50 bronze and finished 5th in the medal table.

== Medalists ==
=== Gold medalists ===
Medal	Name	Sport	Event
Gold	Mustapha Badid	Athletics	Men's 200m A1-3/A9/L2
Gold	Farid Amarouche	Athletics	Men's 400m 4
Gold	Farid Amarouche	Athletics	Men's 1500m 4
Gold	Mustapha Badid	Athletics	Men's 1500m A1-3/A9/L2
Gold	Farid Amarouche	Athletics	Men's 5000m 4
Gold	Mustapha Badid	Athletics	Men's 5000m A1-3/A9/L2
Gold	Jean Francois Poitevin	Athletics	Men's 10000m 4
Gold	Jean Francois Poitevin	Athletics	Men's marathon 4
Gold	Mustapha Badid	Athletics	Men's marathon A1-3/A9/L1-2
Gold	Michel Bapte	Athletics	Men's long jump C7
Gold	Rudi van den Abbeele	Athletics	Men's pentathlon 5–6
Gold	Martine Prieur	Athletics	Women's 100m 5–6
Gold	Valerie Deconde	Athletics	Women's 400m A1-3/A9/L2
Gold	Martine Prieur	Athletics	Women's pentathlon 5–6
Gold	Tristan Mouric	Cycling	Men's 50 km LC2
Gold	Francisco Trujillo	Cycling	Men's 70 km LC4
Gold	Michel Abalain	Powerlifting	Men's -67.5 kg coed
Gold	Bernard Barberet	Powerlifting	Men's -90 kg
Gold	Eric Ghysel	Swimming	Men's 50m freestyle B2
Gold	David Foppolo	Swimming	Men's 100m freestyle A5
Gold	Eric Ghysel	Swimming	Men's 100m freestyle B2
Gold	David Foppolo	Swimming	Men's 50m backstroke A5
Gold	Bernard Micorec	Swimming	Men's 100m backstroke 5
Gold	Bernard Micorec	Swimming	Men's 100m breaststroke 5
Gold	Eric Richard	Swimming	Men's 100m breaststroke A5
Gold	David Foppolo	Swimming	Men's 50m butterfly A5
Gold	David Foppolo	Swimming	Men's 200m individual medley A5
Gold	Men's relay team	Swimming	Men's 4x50m freestyle relay A1-A8
Gold	Men's relay team	Swimming	Men's 4x50m medley relay A1-A8
Gold	Genevieve Pairoux	Swimming	Women's 50m freestyle L1
Gold	Agnes Beraudias	Swimming	Women's 100m freestyle L5
Gold	Beatrice Pierre	Swimming	Women's 25m backstroke L1
Gold	Helene Binet	Swimming	Women's 50m backstroke C6
Gold	Genevieve Pairoux	Swimming	Women's 25m breaststroke L1
Gold	Michel Peeters	Table tennis	Men's singles 2
Gold	Claude Chedeau	Table tennis	Men's singles TT open
Gold	Guy Tisserant	Table tennis	Men's singles TT2
Gold	Michel Gauducheau; Guy Tisserant	Table tennis	Men's teams TT2
Gold	Bernadette Darvand	Table tennis	Women's singles TT6
Gold	Robert Citerne	Wheelchair fencing	Men's épée 4–6
Gold	Arthur Bellance	Wheelchair fencing	Men's foil 4–6
Gold	Arthur Bellance; Andre Hennaert; Yvon Pacault	Wheelchair fencing	Men's team foil
Gold	Pascal Durand; Andre Hennaert; Yvon Pacault	Wheelchair fencing	Men's team sabre
Gold	Jannick Seveno	Wheelchair fencing	Women's épée 1C-3
Gold	Murielle Desmarets	Wheelchair fencing	Women's foil 1C-3
Gold	Sabbah Aoutar; Murielle Desmarets; Therese Lemoine; Jannick Seveno	Wheelchair fencing	Women's team foil

=== Silver medalists ===
Medal	Name	Sport	Event
Silver	Mustapha Badid	Athletics	Men's 100m A1-3/A9/L2
Silver	Michel Bapte	Athletics	Men's 100m C7
Silver	Farid Amarouche	Athletics	Men's 800m 4
Silver	Jean Francois Poitevin	Athletics	Men's 1500m 4
Silver	Jean Francois Poitevin	Athletics	Men's 5000m 4
Silver	Michel Pavon	Athletics	Men's 5000m B2
Silver	Farid Amarouche	Athletics	Men's 10000m 4
Silver	Farid Amarouche	Athletics	Men's marathon 4
Silver	Philippe Couprie	Athletics	Men's marathon A1-3/A9/L1-2
Silver	Paul Collet	Athletics	Men's marathon B2
Silver	Valerie Deconde	Athletics	Women's 100m A1-3/A9/L2
Silver	Valerie Deconde	Athletics	Women's 200m A1-3/A9/L2
Silver	Florence Gossiaux	Athletics	Women's 800m 1C
Silver	Rene Duchemin	Judo	Men's -65 kg
Silver	Guy Dumarquez	Shooting	Men's air pistol standing LSH2
Silver	Bernard Micorec	Swimming	Men's 100m freestyle 5
Silver	Eric Richard	Swimming	Men's 100m freestyle A5
Silver	Emmanuel Lacroix	Swimming	Men's 100m freestyle A8
Silver	Claude Badie	Swimming	Men's 100m freestyle C3
Silver	Bernard Micorec	Swimming	Men's 400m freestyle 5
Silver	Mohamed Ait Aissa	Swimming	Men's 50m backstroke 3
Silver	Eric Richard	Swimming	Men's 50m backstroke A5
Silver	Robert Gallais	Swimming	Men's 100m backstroke A4
Silver	Emmanuel Lacroix	Swimming	Men's 100m backstroke A8
Silver	Claude Badie	Swimming	Men's 100m backstroke C3
Silver	Claude Badie	Swimming	Men's 200m backstroke C3
Silver	Eric Ghysel	Swimming	Men's 50m breaststroke B2
Silver	Eric Fleury	Swimming	Men's 100m breaststroke L4
Silver	Patrick Moyses	Swimming	Men's 25m butterfly 3
Silver	Eric Richard	Swimming	Men's 50m butterfly A5
Silver	Claude Dupin	Swimming	Men's 100m butterfly L5
Silver	Bernard Micorec	Swimming	Men's 200m individual medley 5
Silver	Men's relay team	Swimming	Men's 4 × 100 m medley relay T/P open
Silver	Beatrice Pierre	Swimming	Women's 50m freestyle L1
Silver	Helene Binet	Swimming	Women's 100m freestyle C6
Silver	Goislaine Cristallo	Swimming	Women's 100m freestyle L5
Silver	Guy Tisserant	Table tennis	Men's singles 1A-4
Silver	Marc Piras	Table tennis	Men's singles TT4
Silver	Thierry Garofalo; Marc Piras	Table tennis	Men's teams TT5
Silver	Women's team	Table tennis	Women's teams TT6
Silver	Arthur Bellance; Serge Besseiche; Robert Citerne	Wheelchair fencing	Men's team épée
Silver	Pascal Durand	Wheelchair fencing	Men's sabre 1C-3
Silver	Yvon Pacault	Wheelchair fencing	Men's sabre 4–6
Silver	Therese Lemoine	Wheelchair fencing	Women's foil 4–6

=== Bronze medalists ===
Medal	Name	Sport	Event
Bronze	Lucien Courtillon; Jean-Michel Favre; Daniel Lelou	Archery	Men's double FITA round team open
Bronze	Philippe Couprie	Athletics	Men's 800m A1-3/A9/L2
Bronze	Jean-Yves Arvier	Athletics	Men's 800m A6/A8-9/L4
Bronze	Michel Pavon	Athletics	Men's 800m B2
Bronze	Philippe Couprie	Athletics	Men's 1500m A1-3/A9/L2
Bronze	Michel Pavon	Athletics	Men's 1500m B2
Bronze	Jean-Yves Arvier	Athletics	Men's 10000m A6/A8-9/L4
Bronze	Rudi van den Abbeele	Athletics	Men's discus throw 5
Bronze	Eric Laderval	Athletics	Men's javelin throw L5
Bronze	Valerie Deconde	Athletics	Women's 800m A1-3/A9/L2
Bronze	Martine Prieur	Athletics	Women's discus throw 5
Bronze	Pascal Thevenon	Cycling	Men's 70 km LC4
Bronze	Daniel Fourcade	Judo	Men's -86 kg
Bronze	Serge Pittard	Shooting	Men's air rifle 3 positions 2–6
Bronze	Marie Therese Pichon	Shooting	Women's air pistol standing LSH2
Bronze	Marie Chantel Barberaud; Pierre Guivarch; Philippe Michoux	Shooting	Mixed air pistol team open
Bronze	Michel Pelon; Nicole Petit; Serge Pittard	Shooting	Mixed air rifle prone team 2–6
Bronze	Franck Maille	Swimming	Men's 50m freestyle L1
Bronze	Pascal Auclair	Swimming	Men's 100m freestyle 4
Bronze	Michael Boucherie	Swimming	Men's 100m freestyle A4
Bronze	Franck Maille	Swimming	Men's 100m freestyle L1
Bronze	Franck Maille	Swimming	Men's 25m backstroke L1
Bronze	Jean Marc Durieux	Swimming	Men's 50m backstroke 2
Bronze	Herve Prisset	Swimming	Men's 100m backstroke 5
Bronze	Franck Maille	Swimming	Men's 25m breaststroke L1
Bronze	Pascal Auclair	Swimming	Men's 50m butterfly 4
Bronze	Bernard Micorec	Swimming	Men's 100m butterfly 5
Bronze	Emmanuel Lacroix	Swimming	Men's 100m butterfly A8
Bronze	Eric Ghysel	Swimming	Men's 100m butterfly B2
Bronze	Pascal Auclair	Swimming	Men's 200m individual medley 4
Bronze	Eric Richard	Swimming	Men's 200m individual medley A5
Bronze	Eric Ghysel	Swimming	Men's 200m individual medley B2
Bronze	Men's relay team	Swimming	Men's 4 × 100 m freestyle relay A-L
Bronze	Isabelle Duranceau	Swimming	Women's 400m freestyle A8
Bronze	Genevieve Pairoux	Swimming	Women's 25m backstroke L1
Bronze	Yvonne Lumineau	Swimming	Women's 100m backstroke C4
Bronze	Isabelle Duranceau	Swimming	Women's 100m breaststroke A8
Bronze	Isabelle Duranceau	Swimming	Women's 100m butterfly A8
Bronze	Isabelle Duranceau	Swimming	Women's 200m individual medley A8
Bronze	Women's relay team	Swimming	Women's 4 × 100 m medley relay A-L
Bronze	Daniel Jeannin	Table tennis	Men's singles 1C
Bronze	Michel Gauducheau	Table tennis	Men's singles TT2
Bronze	Dominique Hainault	Weightlifting	Men's -65 kg
Bronze	Jean Grandsire	Weightlifting	Men's -75 kg
Bronze	Edmond Haddad	Weightlifting	Men's +95 kg
Bronze	Men's basketball team	Wheelchair basketball	Men's tournament
Bronze	Andre Hennaert	Wheelchair fencing	Men's foil 1C-3
Bronze	Andre Hennaert	Wheelchair fencing	Men's sabre 1C-3
Bronze	Jannick Seveno	Wheelchair fencing	Women's foil 1C-3

=== Demonstration sports ===
Wheelchair tennis debuted in the 1988 Summer Paralympics. Laurent Giammartini won the gold medal in the men's singles. He went on to win a bronze medal in the 1992 Summer Paralympics.

== See also ==
- France at the Paralympics
- France at the 1988 Summer Olympics
