= Stephen Austen =

Australian Paralympic athlete

Personal information
- Full name: Stephen Austin
- Nationality: Australia
Medal record
Archery
Paralympic Games
Silver medal – second place	1984 New York/Stoke Mandeville	Men's Short metric round team 1A-6

Stephen Austin is an Australian Paralympic archery silver medalist.

He won a silver medal in the Men's Short Metric Round Team 1A-6. He finished 8th in the Men's Double Advanced Metric Round Paraplegic.
