= Centennial Park (Toronto) =

Regional park in Toronto, Ontario, Canada

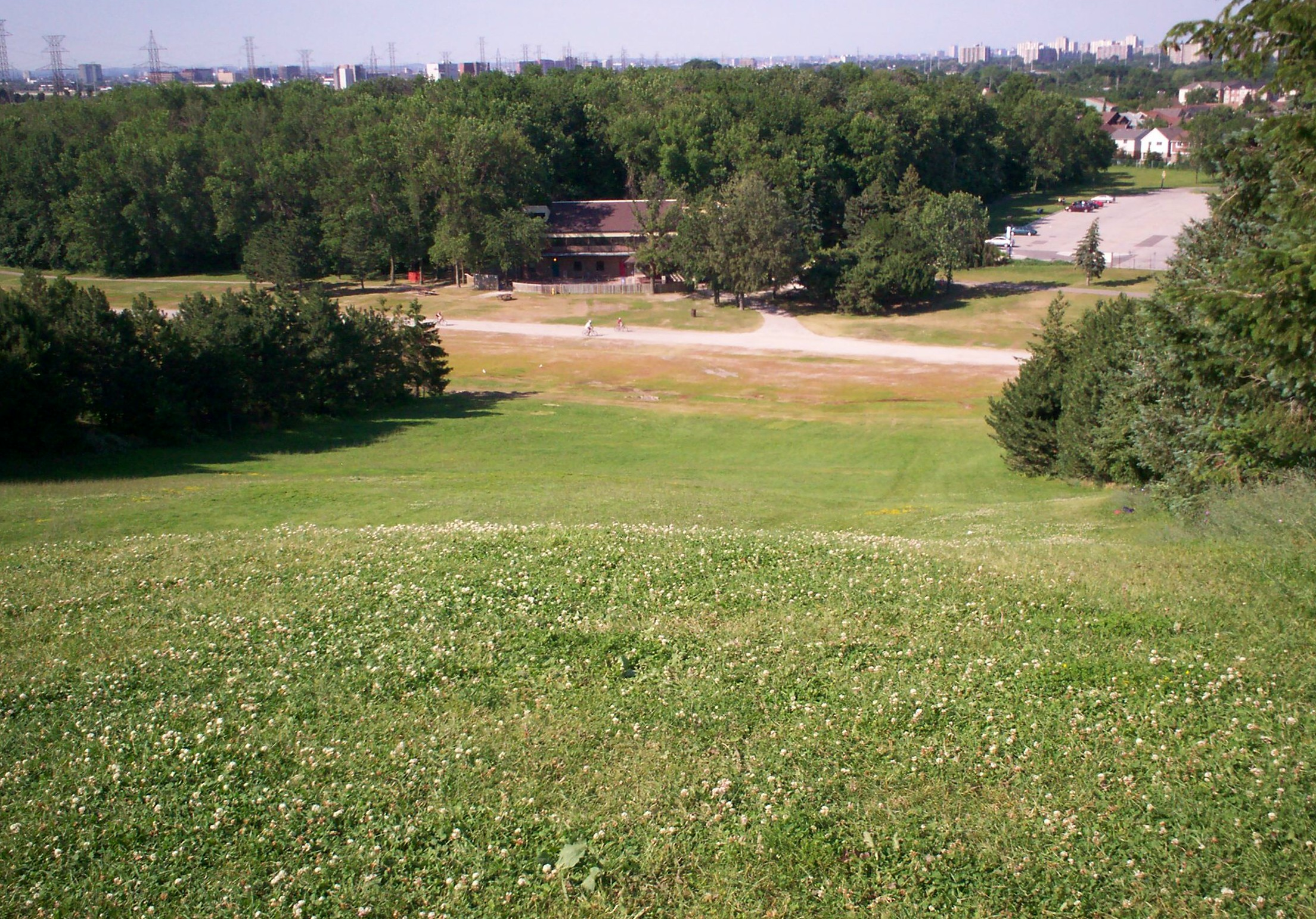
- Centennial Park ski hill during the summer.

- Location within Toronto
- Type: Public Park
- Location: Etobicoke, Toronto, Ontario, Canada
- Coordinates: 43°39′10″N 79°35′20″W
- Area: 525.2 acres (212.5 ha)
- Created: 1967
- Operator: Toronto Parks

Centennial Park is a large municipal park with many sports facilities, maintained by the Parks, Forestry and Recreation Division of the city of Toronto, Ontario, Canada.

== History ==
The park was opened in 1967 for Canada's 100th birthday by the then-Borough of Etobicoke and was part of the Hirons' dairy farm (the remaining part of the farm was sold for residential development in 1968).

In 1976, the park was one of two venue sites for the 1976 Summer Paralympics.

In 1998, when the six municipalities constituting Metropolitan Toronto were amalgamated, the park was integrated into Toronto Parks and Recreation from the former City of Etobicoke Parks Department. This should not be confused with an identically named small city park in the east end of Toronto, on Centennial Road, Scarborough, which was also inherited by the amalgamation.

In 2015, the park hosted the BMX cycling at the 2015 Pan American Games. After the Games, the BMX track became a legacy site for public use.

In November 2022, the City of Toronto announced the closure of skiing and snowboarding activities at the park, citing declining use due to the COVID-19 pandemic and mechanical issues with the lifts. Reducing snow cover during winter months may also have factored into the decision, but were not directly mentioned by the city. Earl Bales Park remains the only ski and snowboard centre in the city of Toronto.

In 2023, the City of Toronto's Centennial Park Master Plan required the closure of the go karting facilities at the park. Upgrades to the park were revealed ahead of the 2026 FIFA World Cup, where it was used by teams as a training site. Four baseball diamonds, eight beach volleyball courts, 12 pickleball courts, three soccer pitches and a new multi-use field at Centennial Park were unveiled in 2026.

== Features ==
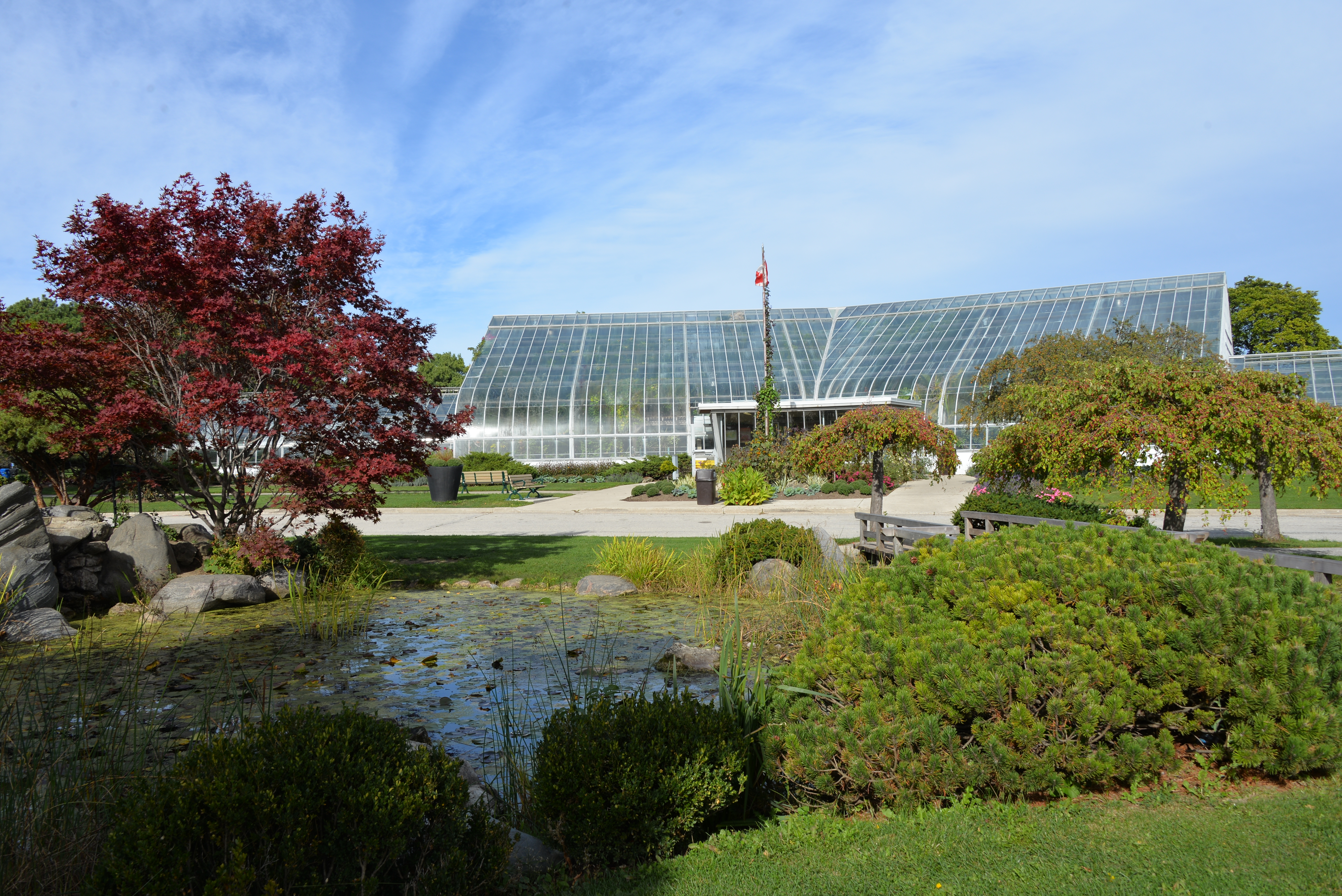
Centennial Park Conservatory

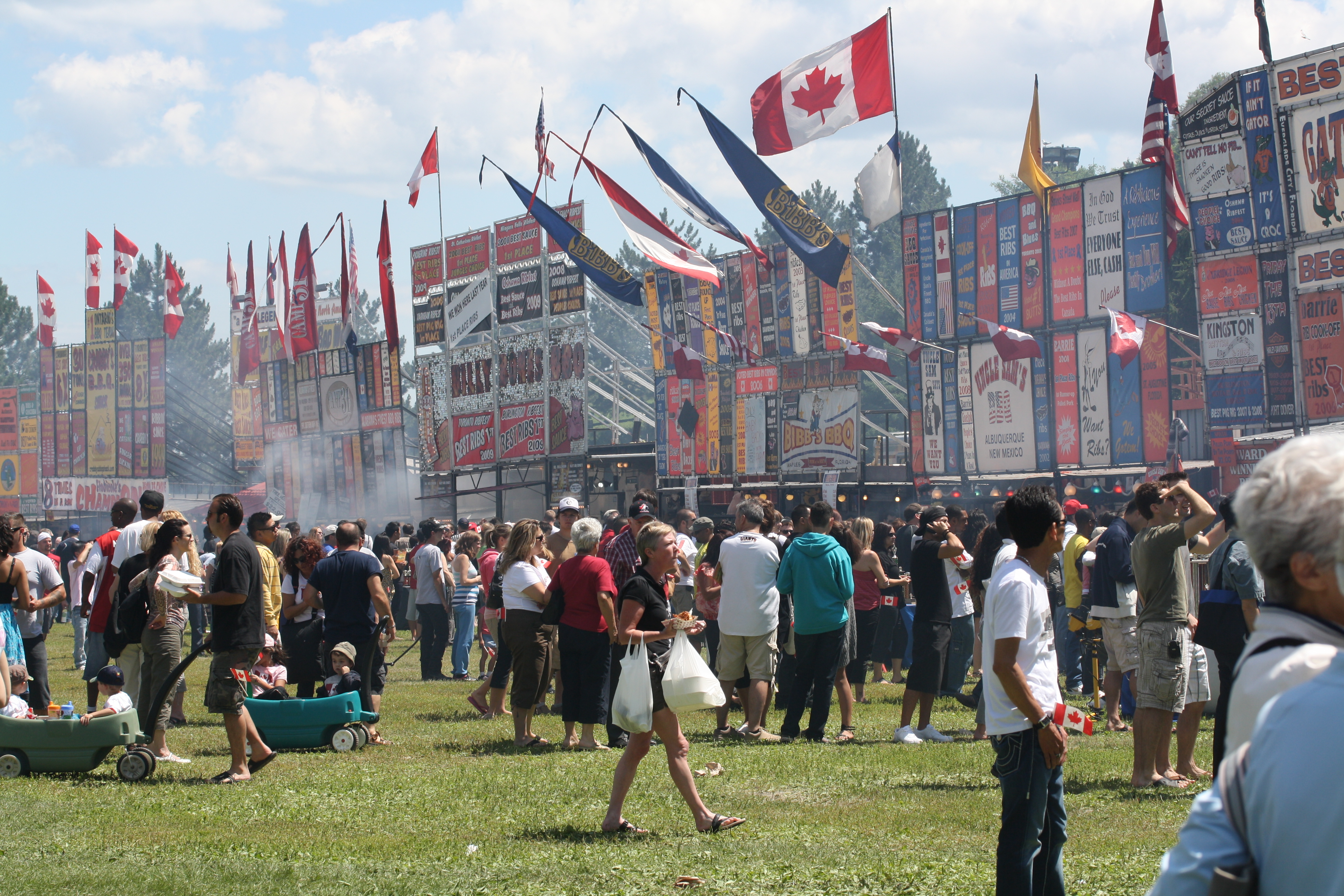
Crowds at Toronto Ribfest for Canada Day weekend in 2010

The park has a variety of features including:

- Centennial Park Conservatory
- Etobicoke Olympium, a large athletic centre that was built in 1975.
- Centennial Hill was the site of a municipal dump and the south end was used as a transfer station.
- Rob Ford Stadium, formerly Centennial Park Stadium, is a 3,500 seat capacity stadium that is primarily used for athletics, soccer and occasionally for kabaddi.
- Centennial Park Arena 2 pads
- In the mid to late 1970s there was a Motocross track at Centennial park, open for riding and also held Motocross races on Sundays. Mike Austin's MRAC Motorcycle Racing Association of Canada ran the races.
- 8-lane polytan track and field facility
- golf course 120 acres
- picnic areas
- 10 soccer fields
- 5 baseball diamonds
- 12 pickleball courts
- Multi-use field built for the 2026 FIFA World Cup
- 8 beach volleyball courts
- 5 softball diamonds
- Designated Toboggan Hill
- Splash pad
- Playground equipment
- Flying circles
- 2 cricket pitches
- Disc golf Course
- Exercise Course (Kiwanis)
- 7 acres marshland/wetlands
- 11-acre man-made pond
- Centennial Park Pan Am BMX Centre

== See also ==
- Centennial Park (Scarborough)
- North York Ski Centre
- Uplands Ski Centre
- Beaver Valley Ski Club
