= Wheelchair basketball at the 1980 Summer Paralympics =

Wheelchair basketball at the VI Paralympic Games
- Paralympic Wheelchair Basketball

Medalists
1st place, gold medalist(s)		Israel (ISR) (men); West Germany (FRG) (women)
2nd place, silver medalist(s)		Netherlands (NED) (men); Israel (ISR) (women)
3rd place, bronze medalist(s)		United States (USA) (men); United States (USA) (women)

Wheelchair basketball at the 1980 Summer Paralympics consisted of men's and women's team events.

== Medal summary ==
Event	Gold	Silver	Bronze
Men's team	Israel (ISR): Sasson Aharoni; Yossi Amoyal; Haim Cohen; Tzvi Gaziel; Baruch Hagai; Moshe Levy; Shlomo Nekava; Shlomo Pinto; Shaaban Sakhafi; Yoel Shafran; Shaul Wajima; Zion Yakov	Netherlands (NED)	United States (USA)
Women's team	West Germany (FRG)	Israel (ISR)	United States (USA)

Source: Paralympic.org

== See also ==
- Basketball at the 1980 Summer Olympics
