= Wheelchair fencing =

Fencing variation for disabled athletes

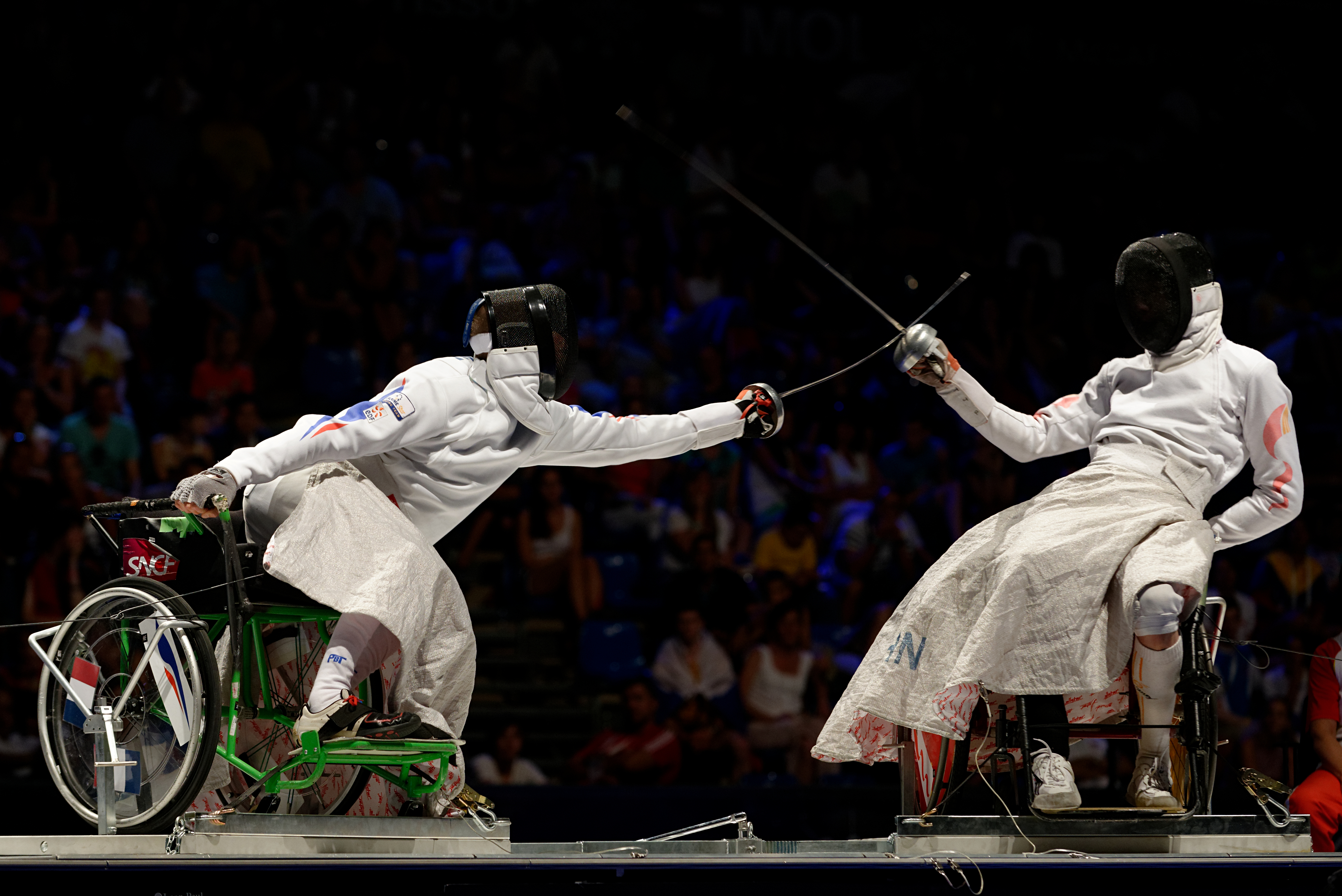
Romain Noble (L) v Tian Jianquan (R) in the final of the épée A event in the 2013 World Fencing Championships

Para fencing, previously known as wheelchair fencing, is a version of fencing for athletes with a disability. It is governed by the World Abilitysport (formally International Wheelchair and Amputee Sports Federation), which is a member of the International Paralympic Committee, and is one of the sports in the Summer Paralympic Games. The Paralympic Games take place every four years in different countries.

== History ==
Dr. Ludwig Guttmann, founder of the Paralympic Movement, initially introduced Para fencing in 1954 at the Stoke Mandeville Games. Since then, the sport has participated in every edition of the Games. Para fencing made its official debut at the 1960 Summer Paralympics in Rome, with nine wheelchair fencers from Italy, including six men and three women. There were two disciplines including sabre and foil events.

Gender equality increased, leading to the women’s epee events being added to the Seoul 1988 Paralympic Games. During the Atlanta 1996 Paralympic Games, several events were included. The sport started developing and shaping a classification system, which was introduced – category A and B.

Para fencing saw a remarkable success in the Paris 2024 Paralympic Games, by being the first Paralympic sport with sold out tickets before the Games. There was a new adjustment to the competition format, called repechage, which is a format that allows athletes to compete further for medals, even if they do not advance from the first take.

New events are going to be added to the LA 2028 Paralympic Games in mixed gender team epee and foil events.

== Equipment ==
With the development of the sport, a steady wheelchair fixed in place has been introduced, which also allows mobility, specifically designed for Para fencing.

- The three types of swords and events are foil, épée, or sabre
- Protective gear includes long trousers, mask, gloves, breeches and a chest protector

== Classification ==
Classification is a system that determines the eligibility of an athlete to compete for a certain sport and to group athletes accordingly for competition purposes. Athletes are grouped to compete against each other, depending on their common impairment.

In Para fencing there are three classes of competition – A, B and C.

Categories A and B are classes participating in the Paralympic Games involving athletes with impairments such as spinal-cord injuries, cerebral palsy and amputations. Category C is a class, which takes part in World Para Fencing competitions.

- Class A (athletes with full trunk movement and good balance)
- Class B (athletes with no leg movement and impaired trunk and balance functions)
- Class C (athletes with a disability in all four limbs, not included in the Paralympic Games program)

== Rules ==
In foil and sabre events, points can be scored by being the first to strike the rival in the torso area. In epee, both athletes may win points by striking each other. In the knockout rounds, the rival that strikes five times or most times during the last three minutes is the winner. In the final round, it is required to strike the opponent fifteen times within a span of nine minutes to achieve victory.

== Events ==
=== Stock Mandil Games ===
Since 1954/1955.

=== Paralympic Games ===
Games	Year	Events	Best Nation
1	1960	3	Italy
2	1964	7	Italy
3	1968	10	Italy
4	1972	11	Italy
5	1976	14	France
6	1980	17	France
7	1984	15	France
8	1988	14	France
9	1992	14	France
10	1996	15	France
11	2000	15	Poland
12	2004	15	Hong Kong
13	2008	10	China
14	2012	12	China
15	2016	14	China
16	2020	16	China
17	2024	16	China

=== World Championships ===
U23 and U17 Since 2015

Edition	Year	Host	Dates
1	1994	Hong Kong	
2	1998	(Germany) Euskirchen	
3	2002	(Germany) Frankfurt	
4	2006	(Italy) Turin	
5	2010	(France) Paris	12–20 November
6	2011	(Italy) Catania	8–15 October
7	2013	(Hungary) Budapest	7–12 August
8	2015	(Hungary) Eger	17–24 September
9	2017	(Italy) Rome	6–12 November
10	2019	(South Korea) Cheongju	17–23 September
11	2021	(Poland) Warsaw	5–6 July
12	2023	(Italy) Terni	3–8 October
13	2025	(South Korea) Iksan	2-7 September

=== European Championships ===
Since 1995

Junior Since 2011

Edition	Year	Host	Dates
1	2011	(United Kingdom) Sheffield	13–19 July
2	2014	(France) Strasbourg	7–12 June
3	2016	(Italy) Casale Monferrato	17–22 May
4	2018	(Italy) Terni	17–23 September
5	2021	(Hungary) Eger	14–17 May
6	2022	(Poland) Warsaw	29 November – 4 December
7	2024	(France) Paris	5–10 March

=== Asian Championships ===
1. 2016 Hong Kong
2. 2020 Cancelled
3. 2024 Thailand

=== African Championships ===
2026 in NGR : Commonwealth Games first ever

=== World Cup ===
Since 2005 Senior / U23 / U20

== See also ==
- Paralympic sports
- Fencing at the Summer Paralympics
