= Wheelchair basketball at the 1972 Summer Paralympics =

Wheelchair basketball at the IV Paralympic Games
- Paralympic Wheelchair Basketball

Medalists
1st place, gold medalist(s)		United States (USA) (men); Argentina (ARG) (women)
2nd place, silver medalist(s)		Israel (ISR) (men); Jamaica (JAM) (women)
3rd place, bronze medalist(s)		Argentina (ARG) (men); Israel (ISR) (women)

Wheelchair basketball at the 1972 Summer Paralympics consisted of men's and women's team events.

== Medal summary ==
Event	Gold	Silver	Bronze
Men's team	United States (USA)	Israel (ISR)	Argentina (ARG)
Women's team	Argentina (ARG)	Jamaica (JAM)	Israel (ISR)

Source: Paralympic.org

== Classification system ==
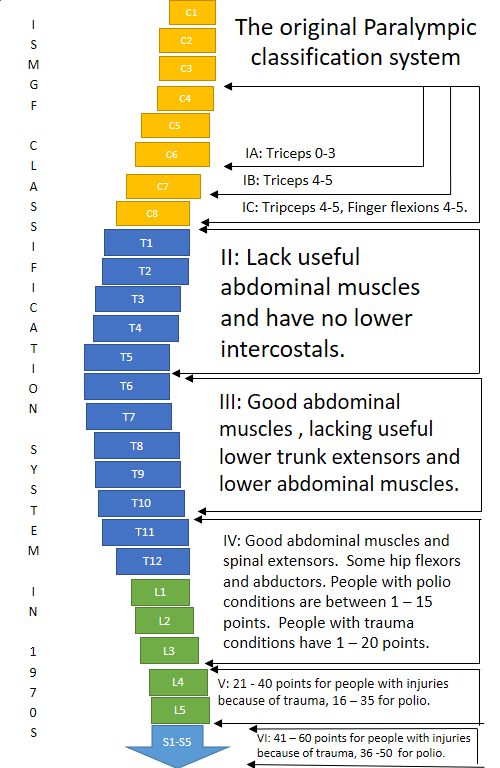
The original ISMGF classification system used at early Paralympic Games.

From 1969 to 1973, a classification system designed by Australian Dr. Bedwell was used. This system used some muscle testing to determine which class incomplete paraplegics should be classified in. It used a point system based on the ISMGF classification system. Class IA, IB and IC were worth 1 point. Class II for people with lesions between T1-T5 and no balance were also worth 1 point. Class III for people with lesions at T6-T10 and have fair balance were worth 1 point. Class IV was for people with lesions at T11-L3 and good trunk muscles. They were worth 2 points. Class V was for people with lesions at L4 to L5 with good leg muscles. Class IV was for people with lesions at S1-S4 with good leg muscles. Class V and IV were worth 3 points. The Daniels/Worthington muscle test was used to determine who was in class V and who was class IV. Paraplegics with 61 to 80 points on this scale were not eligible. A team could have a maximum of 11 points on the floor.

== See also ==
- Basketball at the 1972 Summer Olympics
