= Archery at the 1984 Summer Paralympics =

Archery at the VII Paralympic Games
- Paralympic Archery
- Competitors: 126 from 24 nations

Paralympic symbol (1988-1994)

Archery at the 1984 Summer Paralympics consisted of eighteen events, fourteen for men and four for women.

== Medal table ==
| Rank | Nation | Gold | Silver | Bronze | Total |
|---|---|---|---|---|---|
| 1 | France (FRA) | 4 | 2 | 1 | 7 |
| 2 | Sweden (SWE) | 3 | 0 | 0 | 3 |
| 3 | Belgium (BEL) | 2 | 2 | 0 | 4 |
| 4 | Great Britain (GBR) | 2 | 1 | 4 | 7 |
| 5 | Austria (AUT) | 2 | 1 | 0 | 3 |
| 6 | Norway (NOR) | 1 | 0 | 1 | 2 |
| 6 | United States (USA) | 1 | 0 | 1 | 2 |
| 6 | West Germany (FRG) | 1 | 0 | 1 | 2 |
| 9 | Canada (CAN) | 1 | 0 | 0 | 1 |
| 9 | Switzerland (SUI) | 1 | 0 | 0 | 1 |
| 11 | Netherlands (NED) | 0 | 3 | 0 | 3 |
| 12 | Australia (AUS) | 0 | 2 | 1 | 3 |
| 13 | Japan (JPN) | 0 | 1 | 0 | 1 |
| 13 | South Korea (KOR) | 0 | 1 | 0 | 1 |
| 13 | Spain (ESP) | 0 | 1 | 0 | 1 |
| 16 | Finland (FIN) | 0 | 0 | 2 | 2 |
| 16 | Italy (ITA) | 0 | 0 | 2 | 2 |
| Totals (17 entries) | | 18 | 14 | 13 | 45 |

=== Participating nations ===
- Australia (6)
- Austria (6)
- Belgium (5)
- Canada (4)
- Denmark (1)
- Finland (7)
- France (15)
- Great Britain (15)
- Hong Kong (1)
- Hungary (3)
- Ireland (1)
- Italy (7)
- Japan (4)
- Luxembourg (1)
- Mexico (3)
- Netherlands (4)
- New Zealand (1)
- Norway (5)
- South Korea (5)
- Spain (2)
- Sweden (11)
- Switzerland (3)
- United States (6)
- West Germany (10)

== Medal summary ==
=== Men's events ===
| Event | Gold | Silver | Bronze |
|---|---|---|---|
| Double advanced metric round paraplegic | J. M. Chapuis; France | C. Bouchite; France | Patrick Krishner; United States |
| Double advanced metric round team 1A-6 | France (FRA) | | |
| Double advanced metric round tetraplegic | G. Frank; Austria | Ian Trewhella; Australia | Ernest Arnold; Great Britain |
| Double FITA round C1-C2 | David Barefoot; Canada | | |
| Double FITA round C3,C6 | Philip Thorne; Great Britain | | |
| Double FITA round division 3 | Kjell Løvvold; Norway | Alfons Kuys; Belgium | Benoit Tanquerel; France |
| Double FITA round integrated | Jan Thulin; Sweden | Antonio Rebollo; Spain | Raimo Tirronen; Finland |
| Double FITA round paraplegic | Guy Grun; Belgium | J. Weijers; Netherlands | Heikki Laukkanen; Finland |
| Double FITA round team 1A-6 | Belgium (BEL) | Netherlands (NED) | Great Britain (GBR); Jim Buchanan; Michael Harvey-Murray; Sandy Gregory |
| Double FITA round team integrated | Sweden (SWE); Jan Thulin; Nicolai Babkin; Arne Tjernell | France (FRA); Rene Ducret; George Hamart; Daniel Lelon | West Germany (FRG); Manfred Boeckers; Manfred Brenne; Kilmar Butenhoff |
| Double FITA round tetraplegic | Felix Lettner; Austria | K. Koneman; Netherlands | Oddbjorn Stebekk; Norway |
| Double short metric round paraplegic | Michel Baudois; Switzerland | H. S. Kim; South Korea | Pasquale de Masi; Italy |
| Double short metric round tetraplegic | Kenneth Holm; Sweden | | |
| Short metric round team 1A-6 | France (FRA) | Australia (AUS); Ian Trewhella; David Higgins; Stephen Austen | Great Britain (GBR); Ernest Arnold; Kevin Bowser; James Martin |

=== Women's events ===
| Event | Gold | Silver | Bronze |
|---|---|---|---|
| Double FITA round division 3 | Helen Hilderley; Great Britain | Beverley Leaper; Great Britain | |
| Double FITA round integrated | Anneliese Dersen; West Germany | Martine Lacomblez; Belgium | Irene Monaco; Italy |
| Double FITA round paraplegic | Susan Hagel; United States | Hifumi Suzuki; Japan | Susan Davies; Australia |
| Double short metric round paraplegic | M. P. Balme; France | Rosa Schweizer; Austria | Anne Gray; Great Britain |
