= France at the 1984 Summer Paralympics =

- IPC code: FRA
- NPC: French Paralympic and Sports Committee
- Website: france-paralympique.fr

in Stoke Mandeville/New York
- Competitors: 115 in 12 sports
- Medals Ranked 6th: Gold 71 Silver 69 Bronze 46 Total 186

Summer Paralympics appearances (overview)
- 1960; 1964; 1968; 1972; 1976; 1980; 1984; 1988; 1992; 1996; 2000; 2004; 2008; 2012; 2016; 2020; 2024

France competed at the 1984 Summer Paralympics in Stoke Mandeville, Great Britain and New York City, United States. 115 competitors from France won 186 medals including 71 gold, 69 silver and 46 bronze and finished 6th in the medal table.

== Medalists ==
=== Gold medalists ===
Medal	Name	Sport	Event
Gold	J. M. Chapuis	Archery	Men's double advanced metric round paraplegic
Gold	Men's team	Archery	Men's double advance metric round team 1A-6
Gold	Men's team	Archery	Men's short metric round team 1A-6
Gold	M. P. Balme	Archery	Women's double short metric round paraplegic
Gold	Lucien Quemond	Athletics	Men's 400m B3
Gold	Mustapha Badid	Athletics	Men's 800m A1-3
Gold	Stephane Saas	Athletics	Men's high jump B2
Gold	Antoine Delaune	Athletics	Men's shot put C4
Gold	Rudi van der Abbeele	Athletics	Men's pentathlon 5
Gold	Martine Prieur	Athletics	Women's 100m 5
Gold	Veronique Rochette	Athletics	Women's 200m C7
Gold	Martine Prieur	Athletics	Women's discus throw 5
Gold	Martine Prieur	Athletics	Women's pentathlon 6
Gold	Dominique Molle	Cycling	Men's bicycle 1500m CP div 4
Gold	Dominique Molle	Cycling	Men's bicycle 5000m CP div 4
Gold	Michel Abalain	Powerlifting	Men's 67.5kg
Gold	Daniel Hardy	Powerlifting	Men's 90kg
Gold	Men's team	Shooting	Men's air rifle prone team 1A-6
Gold	Nicolle Sarton	Shooting	Women's air pistol 2-6
Gold	Annie Lecointe	Shooting	Women's air rifle integrated
Gold	Didier Cougouille	Swimming	Men's 25m backstroke C3
Gold	Michel Landra	Swimming	Men's 25m backstroke L2
Gold	Didier Cougouille	Swimming	Men's 25m freestyle C3
Gold	Michel Landra	Swimming	Men's 25m freestyle L2
Gold	Eric Ghysel	Swimming	Men's 50m breaststroke B2
Gold	Eric Ghysel	Swimming	Men's 50m freestyle B2
Gold	Didier Cougouille	Swimming	Men's 50m freestyle C3
Gold	G. Betega	Swimming	Men's 100m backstroke 5
Gold	G. Betega	Swimming	Men's 100m breaststroke 5
Gold	Eric Fleury	Swimming	Men's 100m breaststroke L4
Gold	G. Betega	Swimming	Men's 100m butterfly 5
Gold	Claude Dupin	Swimming	Men's 100m butterfly L5
Gold	Claude Dupin	Swimming	Men's 200m individual medley L5
Gold	G. Betega	Swimming	Men's 400m freestyle 5
Gold	G. Betega	Swimming	Men's 4x50m individual medley 5
Gold	Men's relay team	Swimming	Men's 4x100m medley relay 1A-6
Gold	Beatrice Pierre	Swimming	Women's 25m backstroke C3
Gold	Beatrice Pierre	Swimming	Women's 25m freestyle C3
Gold	Genevieve Payroux	Swimming	Women's 25m freestyle L1
Gold	M. Therese Crespo	Swimming	Women's 50m backstroke 3
Gold	Beatrice Pierre	Swimming	Women's 50m freestyle C3
Gold	Stephanie Proust	Swimming	Women's 50m freestyle C7
Gold	P. Delorme	Swimming	Women's 100m backstroke 5
Gold	Agnes Beraudias	Swimming	Women's 100m backstroke L5
Gold	Isabelle Durandeau	Swimming	Women's 100m breaststroke A8
Gold	Agnes Beraudias	Swimming	Women's 100m butterfly L5
Gold	P. Delorme	Swimming	Women's 100m freestyle 5
Gold	Beatrice Pierre	Swimming	Women's 100m freestyle C3
Gold	Stephanie Proust	Swimming	Women's 100m freestyle C7
Gold	Agnes Beraudias	Swimming	Women's 100m freestyle L5
Gold	Stephanie Proust	Swimming	Women's 200m freestyle C7
Gold	Agnes Beraudias	Swimming	Women's 200m individual medley L5
Gold	P. Delorme	Swimming	Women's 400m freestyle 5
Gold	Women's relay team	Swimming	Women's 4x50m freestyle relay 2-6
Gold	P. Delorme	Swimming	Women's 4x50m individual medley 5
Gold	R. Ferraud	Table tennis	Men's singles C4
Gold	Marc Piras	Table tennis	Men's singles L3
Gold	C. Coullanges	Table tennis	Women's singles C3
Gold	Evelyne Cretual	Table tennis	Women's singles L3
Gold	Jean Grandsire	Weightlifting	Men's 75kg paraplegic
Gold	Bernard Barberet	Weightlifting	Men's 85kg integrated
Gold	Men's basketball team	Wheelchair basketball	Men's tournament
Gold	Men's fencing team	Wheelchair fencing	Men's épée team
Gold	Andre Hennaert	Wheelchair fencing	Men's foil individual 2-3
Gold	Arthur Bellance	Wheelchair fencing	Men's foil individual 4-5
Gold	Men's fencing team	Wheelchair fencing	Men's foil team
Gold	Andre Hennaert	Wheelchair fencing	Men's sabre individual 2-3
Gold	Men's fencing team	Wheelchair fencing	Men's sabre team
Gold	Veronique Soetemondt	Wheelchair fencing	Women's foil individual 1C
Gold	Murielle Desmarets	Wheelchair fencing	Women's foil individual 2-3
Gold	Women's fencing team	Wheelchair fencing	Women's foil team

=== Silver medalists ===
Medal	Name	Sport	Event
Silver	C. Bouchite	Archery	Men's double advanced metric round paraplegic
Silver	Rene Ducret; George Hamart; Daniel Lelon	Archery	Men's double FITA round team integrated
Silver	Andre Havard	Athletics	Men's 60m C6
Silver	Lucien Quemond	Athletics	Men's 100m B3
Silver	Jean Louis Janneay	Athletics	Men's 100m C4
Silver	Michel Bapte	Athletics	Men's 100m C7
Silver	Michel Bapte	Athletics	Men's 200m C7
Silver	Jean Louis Janneay	Athletics	Men's 400m C4
Silver	Jean Louis Janneay	Athletics	Men's 800m C4
Silver	Jean Francois Poitevin	Athletics	Men's marathon 4
Silver	Michel Bapte	Athletics	Men's long jump C7
Silver	Rudi van der Abbeele	Athletics	Men's discus throw 5
Silver	Rudi van der Abbeele	Athletics	Men's shot put 5
Silver	C. Weiss	Athletics	Men's slalom 1B
Silver	Valene Deconde	Athletics	Women's 60m A1-3
Silver	P. Delevacque	Athletics	Women's 100m 1B
Silver	Veronique Rochette	Athletics	Women's 100m C7
Silver	P. Delevacque	Athletics	Women's 200m 1B
Silver	Valene Deconde	Athletics	Women's 200m A1-3
Silver	P. Delevacque	Athletics	Women's 400m 1B
Silver	Veronique Rochette	Athletics	Women's 400m C7
Silver	Christelle Donnez	Athletics	Women's 800m A6
Silver	Veronique Rochette	Athletics	Women's long jump C7
Silver	Martine Prieur	Athletics	Women's javelin throw 5
Silver	Martine Prieur	Athletics	Women's queen of the straight 100m 1A-6
Silver	Patrick Fornet	Powerlifting	Men's 60kg
Silver	Didier Menage	Powerlifting	Men's 60kg
Silver	Joel Guillon	Shooting	Men's air pistol integrated
Silver	Michel Pelon	Shooting	Men's air rifle kneeling 2-6
Silver	Michel Pelon	Shooting	Men's air rifle prone 2-6
Silver	Marie Chantal Barberaud	Shooting	Women's air pistol 2-6
Silver	Nicole Petit	Shooting	Women's air rifle 3 positions 2-6
Silver	Nicole Petit	Shooting	Women's air rifle prone 2-6
Silver	Pascal Jacquot	Swimming	Men's 25m backstroke L1
Silver	Pascal Jacquot	Swimming	Men's 25m freestyle L1
Silver	Mohamed Ait Aissa	Swimming	Men's 50m backstroke 3
Silver	Bernard Micorec	Swimming	Men's 100m backstroke 6
Silver	David Foppolo	Swimming	Men's 100m freestyle A5
Silver	David Foppolo	Swimming	Men's 150m individual medley A5
Silver	Helene Binet	Swimming	Women's 25m backstroke C6
Silver	F. Maury	Swimming	Women's 25m butterfly 1B
Silver	F. Maury	Swimming	Women's 25m freestyle 1B
Silver	Helene Binet	Swimming	Women's 25m freestyle C6
Silver	Sylvie Delplauque	Swimming	Women's 50m backstroke C5
Silver	Stephanie Proust	Swimming	Women's 50m backstroke C7
Silver	Sylvie Delplauque	Swimming	Women's 50m freestyle C5
Silver	Helene Binet	Swimming	Women's 50m freestyle C6
Silver	Sylvie Delplauque	Swimming	Women's 100m backstroke C5
Silver	Stephanie Proust	Swimming	Women's 100m backstroke C7
Silver	Agnes Beraudias	Swimming	Women's 100m breaststroke L5
Silver	Violette Spoka	Swimming	Women's 100m freestyle C3
Silver	Sylvie Delplauque	Swimming	Women's 100m freestyle C5
Silver	Sylvie Delplauque	Swimming	Women's 200m freestyle C5
Silver	Isabelle Durandeau	Swimming	Women's 200m individual medley A8
Silver	F. Maury	Swimming	Women's 3x25m individual medley 1B
Silver	Women's relay team	Swimming	Women's 3x50m medley relay 2-4
Silver	Daniel Jeannin	Table tennis	Men's singles 1C
Silver	Men's team	Table tennis	Men's teams 2
Silver	Bernadette Darvand	Table tennis	Women's open CL
Silver	Bernadette Darvand	Table tennis	Women's singles L4
Silver	Hervé Paillet	Weightlifting	Men's 51kg integrated
Silver	Jean-Michel Barberane	Weightlifting	Men's 51kg paraplegic
Silver	Patrick Garnier	Weightlifting	Men's 65kg integrated
Silver	Gerard Houdmond	Weightlifting	Men's 85kg paraplegic
Silver	N. Clemente	Weightlifting	Men's +95kg paraplegic
Silver	Arthur Bellance	Wheelchair fencing	Men's épée individual 4-5
Silver	Jean-Pierre Leroux	Wheelchair fencing	Men's foil individual 1C
Silver	Olivier Plane	Wheelchair fencing	Men's foil individual 4-5
Silver	Sylviane Meyer	Wheelchair fencing	Women's foil individual 4-5

=== Bronze medalists ===
Medal	Name	Sport	Event
Bronze	Benoit Tanquerel	Archery	Men's double FITA round division 3
Bronze	Antoine Delaune	Athletics	Men's 400m C4
Bronze	Andre Havard	Athletics	Men's 400m C6
Bronze	Jean Francois Poitevin	Athletics	Men's 5000m 4
Bronze	Antoine Delaune	Athletics	Men's discus throw C4
Bronze	C. Weiss	Athletics	Men's javelin throw 1B
Bronze	Leon Sur	Athletics	Men's javelin throw A2
Bronze	Lucien Quemond	Athletics	Men's javelin throw B3
Bronze	Michel Bapte	Athletics	Men's javelin throw C7
Bronze	C. Weiss	Athletics	Men's pentathlon 1B
Bronze	Martine Prieur	Athletics	Women's 200m 5
Bronze	Martine Prieur	Athletics	Women's 400m 5
Bronze	Martine Prieur	Athletics	Women's shot put 5
Bronze	Guy Dunarquez	Shooting	Men's air pistol integrated
Bronze	Men's team	Shooting	Men's air rifle kneeling team 1A-6
Bronze	Marie Therese Pichon	Shooting	Women's air pistol integrated
Bronze	Nicole Petit	Shooting	Women's air rifle standing 2-6
Bronze	David Foppolo	Swimming	Men's 50m backstroke A5
Bronze	Thierry Legloanic	Swimming	Men's 50m backstroke L3
Bronze	Eric Fleury	Swimming	Men's 100m butterfly L4
Bronze	C. Trog	Swimming	Men's 100m freestyle 1B
Bronze	Eric Ghysel	Swimming	Men's 100m freestyle B2
Bronze	Jean Marc Durieux	Swimming	Men's 200m freestyle 2
Bronze	Mohamed Ait Aissa	Swimming	Men's 200m freestyle 3
Bronze	Eric Ghysel	Swimming	Men's 200m individual medley B2
Bronze	Eric Fleury	Swimming	Men's 200m individual medley L4
Bronze	Bernard Micorec	Swimming	Men's 400m freestyle 6
Bronze	Men's relay team	Swimming	Men's 4x50m freestyle relay 2-6
Bronze	Men's relay team	Swimming	Men's 4x50m freestyle relay L1-L6
Bronze	Bernard Micorec	Swimming	Men's 4x50m individual medley 6
Bronze	Violette Spoka	Swimming	Women's 25m backstroke C3
Bronze	Corinne D'Urzo	Swimming	Women's 50m backstroke 3
Bronze	Isabelle Durandeau	Swimming	Women's 100m backstroke A8
Bronze	Isabelle Durandeau	Swimming	Women's 100m butterfly A8
Bronze	F. Maury	Swimming	Women's 100m freestyle 1B
Bronze	Isabelle Durandeau	Swimming	Women's 100m freestyle A8
Bronze	M. Therese Crespo	Swimming	Women's 4x25m individual medley 3
Bronze	Women's relay team	Swimming	Women's 4x50m freestyle relay C1-C8
Bronze	Philippe Roine	Table tennis	Men's singles L5
Bronze	R. Andre	Table tennis	Women's singles 3
Bronze	Men's volleyball team	Volleyball	Men's standing tournament
Bronze	Dominique Hainault	Weightlifting	Men's 65kg paraplegic
Bronze	Mohamed Beldjilau	Wheelchair fencing	Men's épée individual 2-3
Bronze	Jannick Seveno	Wheelchair fencing	Women's foil individual 2-3
Bronze	Therese Lemoine	Wheelchair fencing	Women's foil individual 4-5

== See also ==
- France at the Paralympics
- France at the 1984 Summer Olympics
