= Events at the 1962 Commonwealth Paraplegic Games =

At the 1962 Commonwealth Paraplegic Games in Perth, Western Australia eighty nine athletes from nine countries competed in fourteen events.

== Medals by events ==
=== Archery ===
The FITA Round for Gentlemen consists of 36 arrows from each of the following distances – at 90, 70, 50, and 30 metres. FITA Round for Ladies consists of 36 arrows from each of the following distances – 70, 60, 50 and 30 metres. Windsor Round consists of 36 arrows at 60, 50, 40 yards. Columbia Round consists of 24 arrows at 50, 40, 30 yards. St Nicholas Round consists of 48 arrows at 40 yards and 36 arrows at 30 yards.

Event	Gold	Silver	Bronze
FITA Round; Gentlemen	Richard Hollick England; 873	Anthony Potter England; 844	Ross Sutton Australia; 779
FITA Round; Ladies	Margaret Harriman Rhodesia; 898	Margaret Maughan England; 475	No medal
Windsor Round; Gentleman	Richard Hollick England; 803	Anthony Potter England; 800	Ross Sutton Australia; 773
Windsor Round; Ladies	Margaret Harriman Rhodesia; 774	R. Harvey Scotland; 485	Margaret Maughan England; 455
Columbia Round; Gentlemen	John Rein Australia; 544	Stefan Gawanick England; 496	Wilf Martin New Zealand; 463
Columbia Round; Ladies	Daphne Ceeney Australia; 507	P. Foulds England; 281	Sally Haynes England; 247
St. Nicholas; Gentlemen	Wilf Martin New Zealand; 632	D. Tinsley Australia; 608	John Newton Australia; 570
St. Nicholas; Ladies	Lynne Gilchrist Rhodesia; 534	Lorraine Dodd Australia; 464	Dr Gaynor Harry Wales; 388

=== Dartchery ===
Dartchery is a combination of darts and archery.

Event	Gold	Silver	Bronze
	John Rein, Ross Sutton Australia	Richard Hollick, Anthony Potter England	No medal

=== Javelin Throw ===
Classification: Class A – paralysed above segment T10 – complete paralysis; Class B – paralysed above segment T10 – incomplete paralysis; Class C – paralysed below segment T10; Class D – cauda equina with functioning thigh muscles.

Event	Gold	Silver	Bronze
Male; Class A	Dick Thompson England; 59 ' 9 "	Frank Ponta Australia; 46 ' 4 3/4"	T. Moran England; 40 ' 3/4 "
Male; Class B	Gary Hooper Australia; 57 ' 9 "	D. Pickering England; 48 ' 7 1/4"	Bruno Moretti Australia; 41 ' 5 3/4 "
Male; Class C	L. Manson Bishop Rhodesia; 59 ' 2 "	R. Maxwell Australia; 53 ' 5 "	D. Tinsley Australia; 53 ' 2 1/4 "
Male; Class D	R. Scott England; 81 ' 11 1/2 "	Kevin Cunningham Australia; 60 ' 3 "	John Turich Australia; 51 ' 1 "
Female; Class A	Lorraine Dodd Australia; 27 ' 5 "	Janet Laughton England; 24 ' 9 1/4 "	Pamela McCarthy India; 14 ' 5 1/2 "
Female; Class B	Lynne Gilchrist Rhodesia; 35 ' 3 3/4"	R. Harvey Scotland; 22 ' 4 3/4'	Shelagh Jones England; 22 ' 4 1/2 "
Female; Class C	Daisy Flint England; 26 ' 11 3/4 "	V. Forder England; 17 ' 9 3/4 "	No medal
Female; Class D	Daphne Ceeney Australia; 34 ' 9 "	Marion Edwards England; 29 ' 5 3/4 "	Margaret Harriman Rhodesia; 26 '

=== Precision Javelin ===
Precision javelin involved throwing a javelin on a target on the ground. Classification: Class A – paralysed above segment T10 – complete paralysis; Class B – paralysed above segment T10 – incomplete paralysis; Class C – paralysed below segment T10; Class D – cauda equina with functioning thigh muscles) .

Event	Gold	Silver	Bronze
Male; Class A	Frank Ponta; 64 points	Dick Thompson England; 60 points	Bruce Thwaite Australia; 60 points
Male; Class B	Gary Hooper Australia; 66 points	D. Pickering England; 62 points	Bruno Moretti Australia; 48 points
Male; Class C	Pompi Heremaia New Zealand; 72 points	T. Palmer England; 70 points	N. Macdonald Scotland; 64 points
Male; Class D	J. Gidney Australia; 64 points	John Turich Australia; 52 points	B. Dickenson England; 50 points
Female; Class A	Lorraine Dodd Australia; 60 points	Janet Laughton England; 36 points	Pamela McCarthy India; 0 points
Female; Class B	Lynne Gilchrist Rhodesia; 48 points	R. Harvey Scotland; 42 points	Gwen Buck England; 28 points
Female; Class C	Daisy Flint England; 66 points	V. Forder England; 2 points	No medal
Female; Class D	Daphne Ceeney; 60 points	Marion Edwards England; 50 points	Margaret Harriman Rhodesia; 22 points

=== Club Throw ===
Club throw involved throwing a wooden object in the form of a club. Classification: Class A – paralysed above segment T10 – complete paralysis; Class B – paralysed above segment T10 – incomplete paralysis; Class C – paralysed below segment T10; Class D – cauda equina with functioning thigh muscles.

Event	Gold	Silver	Bronze
Male; Class A	Dick Thompson England; 107 ' 5 "	Frank Ponta Australia; 80 ' 7 1/2 "	T. Moran England; 75 ' 5 "
Male; Class B	Gary Hooper Australia; 97 ' 3/4 "	D. Pickering England; 87 ' 11 "	Bruno Moretti Australia; 81 ' 10 3/4 "
Male; Class C	L. Manson Bishop Rhodesia; 107 ' 10 1/2"	R. Rowe England; 96 ' 1/4 "	T. Palmer England; 92 ' 8 "
Male; Class D	R. Scott England; 117 ' 4 3/4 "	John Turich Australia; 115 ' 1/4 "	J. Gidney Australia; 87 ' 5 "
Female; Class A	Lorraine Dodd Australia; 54 ' 3 3/4 "	Janet Laughton England; 46 ' 1'	No medal
Female; Class B	Lynne Gilchrist Rhodesia; 67 ' 3/4 '	Shelagh Jones England; 41 ' 9 7/8 "	Gwen Buck England; 40 ' 8 1/4 "
Female; Class C	V. Forder England; 51 ' 1 1/4 "	Daisy Flint England; 40 ' 1 1/2 '	No medal
Female; Class D	Daphne Ceeney Australia; 61 ' 2 1/2 "	Marion Edwards England; 56 ' 1/2 "	Dr Gaynor Harry Wales; 50 ' 7 "

=== Shot Put ===
Classification: Class A – paralysed above segment T10 – complete paralysis; Class B – paralysed above segment T10 – incomplete paralysis; Class C – paralysed below segment T10; Class D – cauda equina with functioning thigh muscles.

Event	Gold	Silver	Bronze
Male; Class A	Dick Thompson England; 61 ' 2 1/2 "	Frank Ponta Australia; 16 ' 18 1/4 "	J. Redgewick England; 15 ' 4 1/2 "
Male; Class B	Gary Hooper Australia; 20 ' 3 3/4 "	P. Pickering England; 19 ' 1 1/4 "	Bill Mather-Brown Australia; 15 ' 9 1/2 "
Male; Class C	L. Manson Bishop Rhodesia; 20 ' 2 1/4 "	N. McDonald Scotland; 19 ' 6 "	M. Shelton England; 19 ' 2 3/4 "
Male; Class D	R. Scott Australia; 22 ' 4 "	John Turich Australia; 22 ' 1/2 "	Roger Cockerill Australia; 19 ' 11"
Female; Class A	Lorraine Dodd Australia; 11 ' 3 1/2 "	Janet Laughton England; 10 ' 5 "	No medal
Female; Class B	Lynne Gilchrist Rhodesia; 15 ' 2 1/4 "	G. Buck England; 11 ' 8 1/4 "	R. Harvey Scotland; 11 ' 4 "
Female; Class C	V, Forder England; 11 ' 1 3/4 "	Daisy Flint England; 10 ' 9 1/2 '	No medal
Female; Class D	Daphne Ceeney Australia; 15 ' 7 1/2 "	Marion Edwards England; 13 ' 2 1/4 "	Margaret Ross Australia; 12 ' 4 1/2"

=== Swimming ===
Swimming events took place in the Beatty Park Pool that was built for the main Games. It was the only event not held at the Showgrounds and therefore posed transport problems for the organisers. This was overcome through volunteer drivers and their cars. Classes for swimming – Class A – paralysed from C8 to T6 segment, Class B – paralysed from T7 to T10 segment – complete paralysis, Class C – paralysed from T7 to T10 segment – incomplete paralysis, Class D – paralysed from T11 to L2 segment and Class E (Caudia equina). 5,500 spectators including Hon. David Brand, Premier of Western Australia attended the second (and final) day of swimming at the Beatty Park Pool. The events were interspersed by swimming and diving demonstrations by members of the Australian British Empire Games team including Murray Rose, Dawn Fraser and David Dickson.

There was also a demonstration by the Western Australian water polo team.

Event	Gold	Silver	Bronze
Male – Crawl 25 m Class A	M. Bazeley Australia; 34.6	F. Crowder England; 44.5	Frank Ponta Australia; 47.7
Male – Crawl 50 m Class B	Bruce Thwaite Australia; 1:09.5	J. Robertson Scotland; 1:37.2	No medal
Male – Crawl 50 m Class C	Alan Yeomans Australia; 1:00.1	Bill Mather-Brown Australia; 1:00.2	Gary Hooper Australia; 1:52.7
Male – Crawl 25 m Class D	L. Manson Bishop Rhodesia; 47.3	B. Dickenson England; 49.7	Kevin Cunningham Australia; 50.4
Male – Breaststroke 25 m Class A	M. Bazeley Australia; 29.7 (record)	F. Crowder England; 48.2	Frank Ponta Australia; 55.1
Male – Breaststroke 50 m Class B	Bruce Thwaite Australia; 1:27.6	No medal	No medal
Male – Breaststroke 50 m Class C	Alan Yeomans Australia; 1:14.2	Gary Hooper Australia; 1:38.07	Bill Mather-Brown Australia; 1:44.04
Male – Breaststroke 50 m Class D	L. Manson Bishop Rhodesia; 1:02.06	Don Watts Australia; 1:09.8	B. Dickenson England; 1:10.5
Male – Backstroke 25 m Class A	F. Crowder England; 33.9	M. Bazeley Australia; 33.9	Frank Ponta Australia; 36.2
Male – Backstroke 50 m Class C	Bill Mather-Brown Australia; 1:21.04	Alan Yeomans Australia; 1:37.4	Gary Hooper Australia; 1:41.9
Male – Backstroke 25 m Class D	B. Dickenson England; 47.2	L. Manson Bishop Rhodesia; 56.4	Peter McCranor England; 1:21.3
Female –Crawl25 m Class A	Lorraine Dodd Australia 36.2 (record); P. McCarthy India 1.13.4 (awarded Gold Medal as incomplete Class A)	Lady Susan Masham England; 58.5	Refer to Gold Medal
Female – Crawl 50 m Class B	No race		
Female – Crawl 50 m Class C	Lynne Gilchrist Rhodesia; 49.6	Daisy Flint England; 1:42.6	No medal
Female – Crawl 50 m Class D	No race		
Female – Crawl 50 m Class E	Daphne Ceeney Australia; 49.4	Margaret RossAustralia; 52.6	Margaret Harriman Rhodesia; 1:00.7
Female – Breaststroke 25 m Class A	Lorraine Dodd Australia; 34.9 (record)	Lady Susan Masham England; 52.6	No medal
Female – Breaststroke 50 m Class B	Janet Laughton England swan alone	No medal	No medal
Female – Breaststroke 50 m Class C	Lynne Gilchrist Rhodesia; 1:05.6	Daisy Flint England; 1:59.2	Shelagh Jones England; 2:31.6
Female – Breaststroke 50; Class D	V. Forder England; 1:58.7	No competitor	No medal
Female – Breaststroke 50 m Class E	Daphne Ceeney Australia; 1:41.8	Margaret Harriman Rhodesia; 1:50.0	Margaret Ross Australia; 1:56.1
Female – Backstroke 25 m Class A	Lorraine Dodd Australia; 48.7	Lady Susan Masham England; 52.6	No medal
Female – Backstroke 50 mm Class B	Janet LaughtonEngland swam alone	No medal	No medal
Female – Backstroke 50 m Class C	Lynne Gilchrist Rhodesia; 56.5	A. Masson England; 1:15.2	Daisy Flint England; 1:20.4
Female – Backstroke 50 m Class D	V. Forder England; 1:21.6	No medal	No medal
Female – Backstroke 50 m Class E	Daphne Ceeney Australia; 1:41.8	Margaret Harriman Rhodesia; 1:14.4	P. Foulds England; 1;15.3

No medal refers to insufficient competitors.

=== Weightlifting ===
This event involved a standard supine press. There were four classes: heavyweight (above 12 stone), middleweight (between 10 and 12 stone), lightweight (between 8 and 10 stone) and featherweight (under 8 stone). Athletes from sports such as table tennis, fencing, throwing events, and swimming decided to enter this event. Vic Renaldson, an Australian athlete in the heavyweight division, set a new paraplegic world record.

Event	Gold	Silver	Bronze
Class A Heavyweight	Vic Renalson Australia; 340 lbs	John Turich Australia; 280 lbs	J. Rowe England; 215 lbs
Class B Middleweight	T. Palmer England; 250 lbs	Bruce Thwaite Australia; 245 lbs	Chris O'Brien Australia; 220 lbs
Class C Lightweight	Bill Mather-Brown Australia; 230 lbs	Gary Hooper Australia; 200 lbs	Roger Cockerill Australia; 195 lbs
Class D Featherweight	Bruno Moretti Australia; 180 lbs	No medal	No medal

=== Pentathlon ===
Pentathlon consisted of five events: javelin throw, club throw, shot put, archery and swimming (50 m crawl).

Event	Gold	Silver	Bronze
Complete Lesions	Dick Thompson England; 3149 points	J. Robertson Scotland; 2090 points	–
Incomplete Lesions	Kevin CunninghamAustralia; 3212 points	John Turich Australia; 3162 points	L. Manson Bishop Rhodesia; 3135 points

=== Fencing ===
Event	Gold	Silver	Bronze
Sabre – Male – Individuals	Frank Ponta Australia	Alastair Shields Scotland	Dick Thompson England
Sabre – Male – Teams	J. Thompson, Dick Thompson England	Frank Ponta, Ross Sutton Australia	T. Smart, S . Winters Wales
Sabre – Females – Individuals	Shelagh Jones England	Daphne Ceeney Australia	M. Taylor Scotland

=== Snooker ===
Event	Gold	Silver	Bronze
	J. Gibson England	Alan Robertson Australia	No Medal

Scores: 60–56; 51–27

=== Basketball ===
Basketball had an exciting series of matches and these were played in front of large crowds particularly as the opening and final matches were associated with the series. Several games were played under floodlight. It was noted that the English team used four-wheel chairs and the Australians three-wheeled sports chairs. The Australian team made up of primarily Western Australians went on to win the gold medal.

Event	Gold	Silver	Bronze
	Australia	England	Scotland

Scores: Australia 20 d England 18; Australia 36 v Scotland 6; England 18 v Scotland 7; Australia 24 v England 16; Australia 34 v Scotland 10; England 24 v Scotland 15

The results do not list the athletes in the teams but the programme listed nominated athletes for basketball. There were 5 athletes per team. Australia – Frank Ponta, Roger Cockerill, Kevin Cunningham, John Turich, Bill Mather-Brown, Chris O'Brien, D. Tinsley, Bruni Moretti, J. Gidney, R. Maxwell England – R. Foster, T. Moran, J. Chilcott, K. Edwards, J. Gibson, Dick Thompson, J. Thompson, T. Palmer, R. Scott Scotland – T. Guthrie, N. Macdonald, J. Robertson, J.G. Robertson, J. Sloway, P. Stanton, J. Whitefield, A. Shields

=== Table Tennis ===
Event	Gold	Silver	Bronze
Singles – Male; Class A	Dudley Phillips Wales; 21–16; 21–3	B. Hunt Scotland	
Singles – Male; Class B	Bruno Moretti Australia; 21–17; 21–8	Bill Mather-Brown Australia	
Singles – Male; Class D	J. Gibson England; 21–14; 21–17	Peter McCranor England	
Singles – Female; Class A	M. Taylor Scotland; 21–19; 21–11	Lorraine Dodd Australia	
Singles – Female; Class B	G. Buck England; 14–21; 21–16; 21–19	A. Masson England	
Singles – Female; Class C	Margaret Maughan England; 18–21; 21–8; 21–13	Daisy Flint England	
Singles – Female; Class D	Marion Edwards England; 21–10; 21–14	Margaret Harriman Rhodesia	
Doubles – Male; Class A	K. Edwards, R. Foster England; 19–21; 21–12; 21–17	B. Hunt, T.G. Robertson Scotland	
Doubles – Male; Class B	Bruno Moretti, Bill Mather-Brown Australia; 21–18; 21–10	John Newton, Frank Ponta Australia	
Doubles – Male; Class C	J. Robertson, Jimmy Laird Scotland; 21–11; 21–16	B. Maxwell, Don WattsAustralia	
Doubles – Male; Class D	J. Gibson, Peter McCranor England; 21–5; 21–7	Roger Cockerill, J. Gidney Australia	
Doubles – Female; Open	A. Masson, Marion Edwards England; 21–8; 21–11	Lady Susan Masham, Sally Haynes England	
