= Australia at the 1960 Summer Paralympics =

- IPC code: AUS
- NPC: Australian Paralympic Committee
- Website: www.paralympic.org.au

in Rome
- Medals Ranked 7th: Gold 3 Silver 6 Bronze 1 Total 10

Summer Paralympics appearances (overview)
- 1960; 1964; 1968; 1972; 1976; 1980; 1984; 1988; 1992; 1996; 2000; 2004; 2008; 2012; 2016; 2020; 2024

== Background ==
The competition was at the time terrific. But when you think of what they do today, it wasn't the same. You had to be in more than one sport to participate in the Games. It was so different than today where athletes focus on one sport.

— Daphne Hilton, athlete

The 1960 Summer Paralympic Games held in Rome, Italy were the first Paralympic Games. The organizers viewed the event as a chance to help athletes rehabilitate: The primary purpose was not competition. The Australians who were involved as support staff and organizers were mostly medical and medical support personnel. There were no Australian competitors who were blind or amputees because they were not allowed to compete in these games and would not be allowed to compete until the 1976 Summer Paralympics.

At the first Paralympic Games, athletes were required to compete in multiple sports. For Australian athletes, the trip to the games was the first time they had traveled internationally. The Australian team had a team doctor, who frequently doubled as the team manager. Most Australian athletes traveled with only one wheelchair, in which they competed in multiple sports. The wheelchair they used in the Paralympics was the one that they used for their everyday life.

The Olympic Village was not designed with disabled athletes in mind. Housing was built on stilts, with steep stairs leading up to many entrances. These stairs were covered with ramps, but Australian and other athletes found the ramps to be so steep that they could not get into a building without the assistance of one or two people pushing them up.

Australia won 3 gold, 6 silver and 1 bronze medals in four sports and finished 7th overall behind Italy, Great Britain, Germany, Austria, USA and Norway

== The Australian Team ==
The Australian contingent were going into the games with no prior information on the other competing countries and were written to be apprehensive in relation to commencing the games as they had no indication of the abilities of their competitors.

The aim of these games from an Australian and world sporting perspective were undertaken as a concept to witness how the idea of a Paralympic Games would be accepted and how it would run as a new international meet. The Games for Australia specifically were used to better their knowledge over the information regarding the specialized equipment improvements they could make after comparing their own to those of the other countries.

The Australian team succeeded well beyond their original expectations by attaining the level of success in medal numbers they achieved.

== Australian Medalists ==
| Medal | Name | Sport | Event | Result |
|---|---|---|---|---|
| Gold | Ross Sutton | Archery | Men's St. Nicholas Round | 670 pts |
| Gold | Daphne Ceeney | Swimming | Women's 50 m Crawl Complete Class 5 | 47sec |
| Gold | Daphne Ceeney | Swimming | Women's 50 m Breaststroke Complete Class 5 | 1:29:9 mins |
| Silver | Daphne Ceeney | Archery | Women's St. Nicholas Round | 469 pts |
| Silver | Frank Ponta | Athletics | Men's Precision Javelin Throw A | 66 pts |
| Silver | Garry Hooper | Athletics | Men's Precision Javelin Throw B | 66 pts |
| Silver | Daphne Ceeney | Athletics | Women's Javelin Throw C | 11.34 m |
| Silver | Daphne Ceeney | Athletics | Women's Club Throw C | 11.34 |
| Silver | Bill Mather-Brown, Bruno Moretti | Table Tennis | Men's Doubles B | 2nd Place |
| Bronze | Daphne Ceeney | Athletics | Women's Shot Put C | 11.34 m |

Medals by discipline
| Discipline | Gold medal | Silver medal | Bronze medal | Total |
|---|---|---|---|---|
| Archery | 1 | 1 | 0 | 2 |
| Athletics | 0 | 4 | 1 | 5 |
| Wheelchair basketball | 0 | 0 | 0 | 0 |
| Wheelchair fencing | 0 | 0 | 0 | 0 |
| Swimming | 2 | 0 | 0 | 2 |
| Table tennis | 0 | 1 | 0 | 1 |
| Total | 3 | 6 | 1 | 10 |

*The medals had on the back of them separate engravings of the event competed in. The morning before the closing ceremony saw that Pope John XXIII was in attendance and gave an address to the entire Paralympic competitive assembly.

== Final Medal Tally (Top 6 Nations) ==
| Rank | NPC | Gold | Silver | Bronze | Total |
|---|---|---|---|---|---|
| 1 | Italy | 29 | 29 | 24 | 82 |
| 2 | Great Britain | 21 | 14 | 19 | 54 |
| 3 | Fed. Rep. Germany | 15 | 6 | 9 | 30 |
| 4 | Austria | 11 | 8 | 11 | 30 |
| 5 | United States | 11 | 7 | 7 | 25 |
| 6 | Norway | 9 | 3 | 4 | 16 |
| Number of Countries winning a medal | | | | | 17 |
| % of participating countries winning a medal | | | | | 81 |

== Preparing for the Games ==
The games had no bids made to host the Paralympics and as Rome was selected in June 1955 to host the Olympic Games, the Paralympics were decided to follow. The Italian Instituto per l’Assicurazione contro gli Infortuni sul Lavoro (INAIL) assisted with accommodating the Australian team during the time of the games. These games were crucial as the success of them meant the potential for the Paralympic games to be run in conjunction with every Olympic Games. This expanding concept would run in the same year and the same city only a few weeks after the Olympic Games.

Acqua Acetosa was the requested sporting facility that Dr Ludwig Guttmann, Joan Scruton and Charlie Atkinson had personally reviewed to utilize after traveling to Rome to inspect the stadium. This was not to be however as several of the required facilities within the stadium including the lifts and access areas were nonoperational so the grounds were unsuitable. A change had to be made to the grounds that had to be used; this stadium was the Tre Fontane Sports Ground. In addition the original accommodation was not built for para athletes which made accessibility incredibly difficult.

There were no noted mascots for these games however the logo used was the same that had been created for the Stoke Mandeville Games.

== Opening ceremony ==
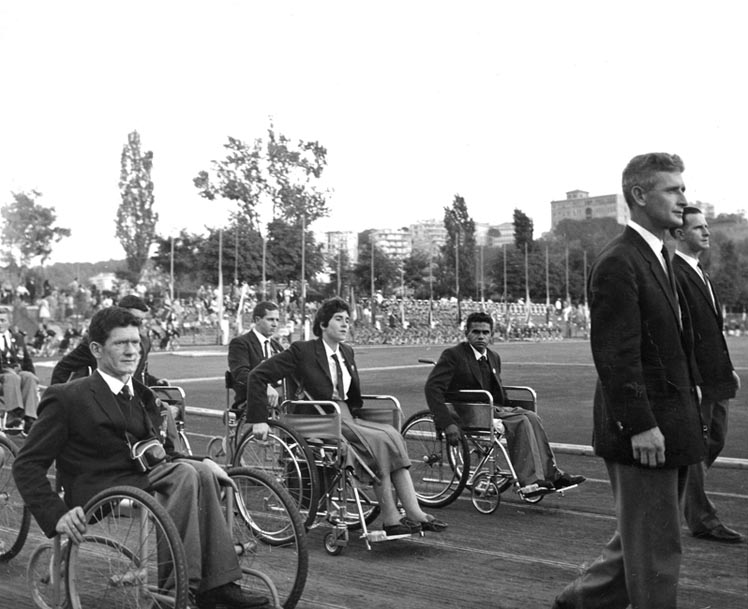
Australian Team at the Opening Ceremony

The opening ceremony took place on 18 September in the Acqua Acetose sports ground at 5:00 pm. The ceremonies began with a parade of the competing nation's starting with the British teams, as the originators of the Paralympic games, followed by other nations in alphabetical order. Given Rome was the host city the Italian teams were the last to enter the sports ground. When all the teams were lined up they were then inspected by Camillo Giardino (Italian Minister for Health), Cesare Merzagora (President of the Italian Senate) and Dr Guttmann. After an opening speech by the President of INAIL, Renato Morelli, the games were officially declared open by Professor Giardina.

== Closing ceremony ==
The closing ceremony took place on 25 September in the Palazzo dello Sport at 9:00 pm. Proceedings took place in the presence of the Patron of the Games, Donna Carla Gronchi, the wife of the Italian Prime Minister. Donna Carla presented some trophies to athletes before Dr Guttmann gave a speech thanking the Italian organizers of the games. He then awarded INAIL a banner of the Stoke Mandeville Games, the highest honor that the Stoke Mandeville Committee could bestow. The President of INAIL, Signor Morelli, then gave the closing speech with Donna Carla Gronchi declaring the first Paralympic games officially closed.

== Disability Classification ==
Different disabilities impact on functional ability to varying degrees. Almost always this impact is one that leads to a competitive disadvantage in sport, hence the differentiation between the Olympic and Paralympic Games. Athletes with different impairments are impacted in different ways but so too are athletes with same or similar disabilities. Two athletes who present with the same type and level of disability may have two different levels of functional ability. It is therefore necessary to classify athletes according to a set of criteria. Athletes are only allowed to compete with those of a similar classification to allow for a more fair and balanced competition. Use of a disability classification system can be thought of in a similar vein as to having weight classes for particular sports or not allowing men and women to compete together in certain sports, so as to provide a more even playing field.

In the modern Olympic games these decisions of who can compete against who is made by a panel of classifiers using two different types of classification systems; a general classification system where the type as well as the degree of impairment is classified and a sport specific or functional classification system where athletes are classified according to their functional ability to carry out specific skills within their competing sport(s). Different sports use either one or both systems in order to classify competing athletes. Generally speaking functional classification is primarily used for physical impairments and general classification for visually or intellectually impaired athletes. During the 1960 Summer Paralympics the only disability groups competing were those with spinal cord injuries or poliomyelitis. Classification was based on a medical examination to determine if the athlete was a complete or incomplete paraplegic or tetraplegic. The competitors with poliomyelitis were further classified as they often were incomplete and had varying levels of sensation in paralyzed limbs. Because of this they were allocated points to differentiate between different levels of sensation and therefore functional ability.

== The Games Themselves ==
Some of the Australian team were unhappy with the officiating efforts by the representatives of the IPC (International Paralympic Committee) as the Australian's felt that they were being unfairly dealt with. Specific instances and primary accounts have stated that the actions the athletes made were disciplined differently than that compared to when the European country participants did the same things.

== Team List ==
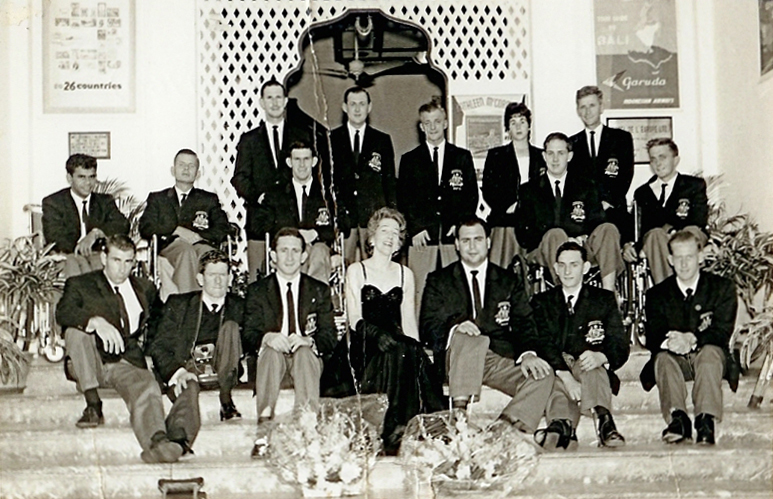
Australian Team in Singapore on their way to the Games

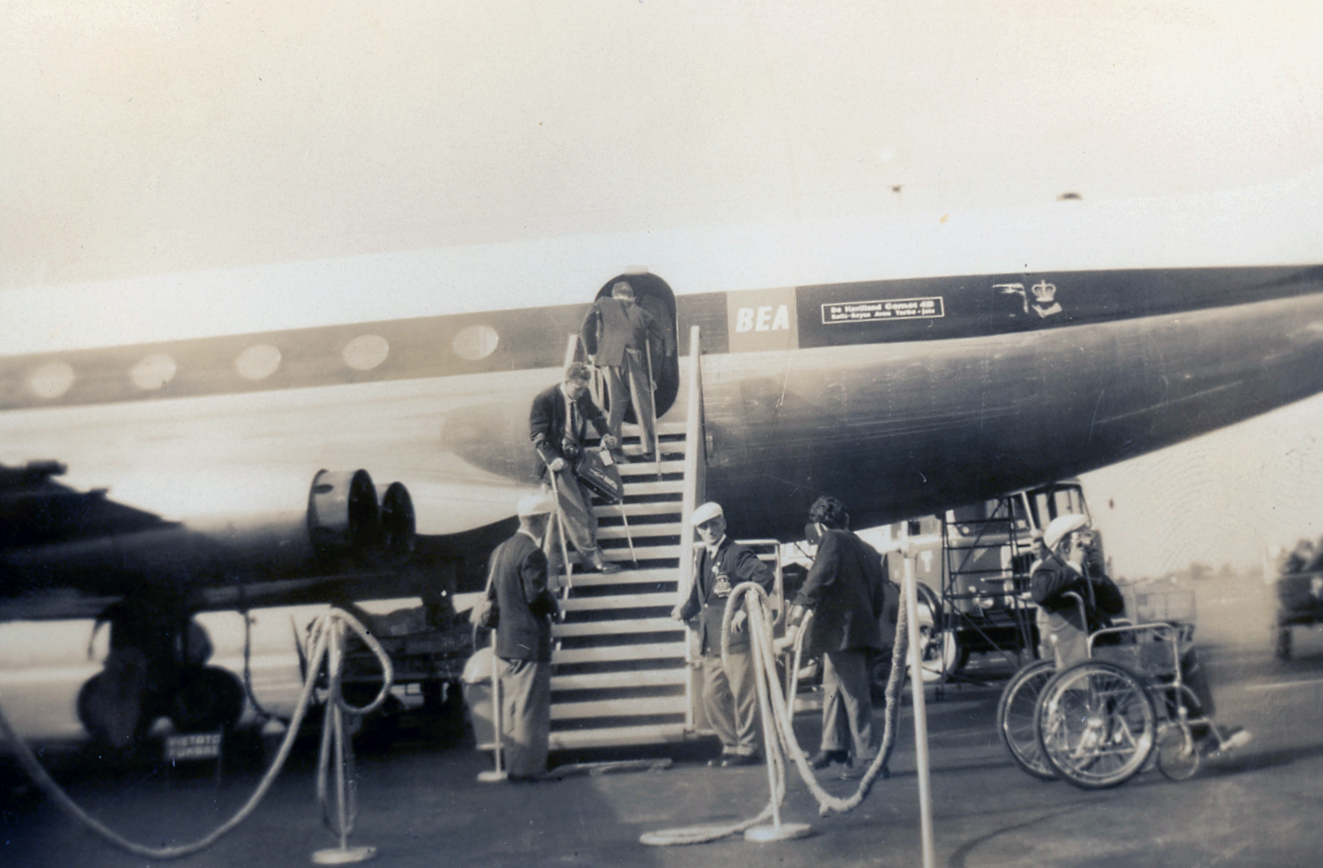
Australian team disembarking from their plane

Australia had 12 athletes competing at the 1960 Summer Paralympics
- Daphne Ceeney
- Gary Hooper
- Robin Tourrier
- Kevin Coombs
- Frank Ponta
- Ross Sutton
- Bruno Moretti
- Christopher O'Brien
- Kevin Cunningham
- Bill Mather-Brown
- Roger Cockerill
- John Turich

The team officials were;

- Dr. David Cheshire (Manager), VIC.
- John Johnston (Physio), WA.
- Kevin Betts, NSW (Remedial Gymnast)
- Fred Ring (Nurse), VIC.

== Participating nations ==
Argentina, Australia, Austria, Belgium, Finland, France, Federal Republic of Germany, Great Britain, Greece, Ireland, Israel, Italy, Lebanon, Malta, Netherlands, Norway, Rhodesia, Sweden, Switzerland, United States and Yugoslavia.

== Events ==
| Archery | Name | State |
|---|---|---|
| Men | Frank Ponta Ross Sutton Robin Tourrier | WA NSW QLD |
| Women | Daphne Ceeney (now Hilton), NSW | NSW |

| Athletics | Name | State |
|---|---|---|
| Men | Frank Ponta Gary Hooper | WA NSW |
| Women | Daphne Ceeney | NSW |

| Swimming | | State |
|---|---|---|
| Men | There were no male competitors at these games | NIL |
| Women | Daphne Ceeney | NSW |

| Table Tennis | Name | State |
|---|---|---|
| Men | Bruno Moretti, Bill Mather-Brown | VIC WA |
| Women | There were no female competitors at these games. | NIL |

| Wheelchair Basketball | Name | State |
|---|---|---|
| Men | John Turich (Team Captain) Roger Cockerill Kevin Coombs Chris O'Brien Kevin Cunningham Gary Hooper Bill Mather-Brown Bruno Moretti Frank Ponta | WA WA VIC WA WA NSW WA VIC WA |
| Women | There were no female competitors at these games. | NIL |

| Wheelchair Fencing | Name | State |
|---|---|---|
| Men | Frank Ponta, Kevin Cunningham Bill Mather-Brown | WA WA |
| Women | There were no female competitors at these games. | N/A |

== After the games ==
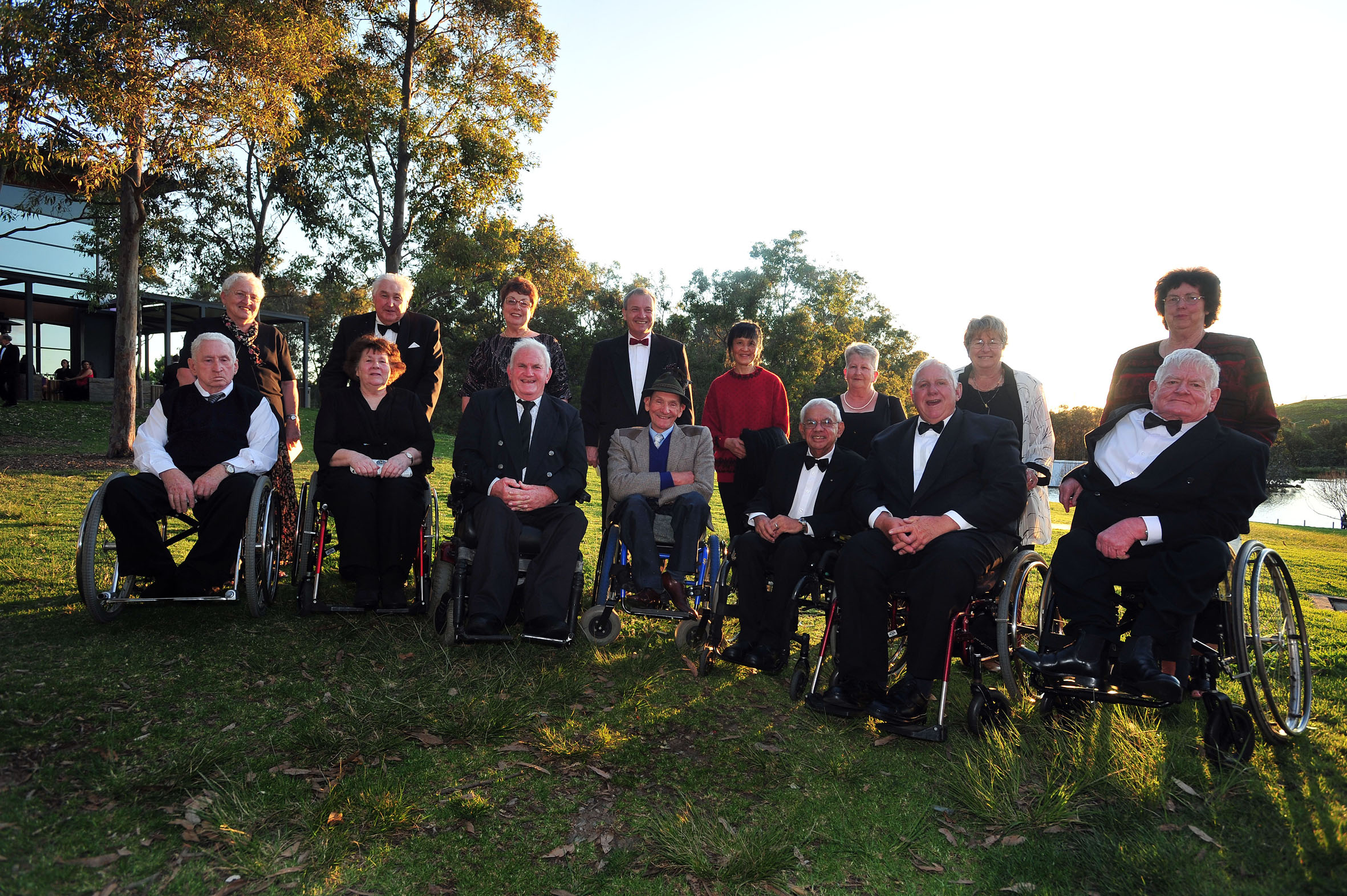
Australian 1960 Paralympics Team 50 year reunion

Boys, I can't really waste Australian funds. You know the public subscribed money so we could come over for a reason. I think we should just go around and look at Rome and some of the villages on the outskirts.

— David Cheshire, Manager,

It was a really big effort because they [the medical team] didn't know how we were going to travel - we didn't know how we were going to travel either.

— Kevin Coombs, athlete

== See also ==
- Australia at the Paralympics

== Bibliography ==
- Cheshire, D. J. E. (1960). The 1960 International Stoke Mandeville Games for the Paralysed; The ninth international Stoke Mandeville Games. The Cord.
- IPC. (2015). Official Website of the Paralympic Movement Retrieved from http://www.paralympic.org/search-results?search_value=1960+medals
- Brittain, I. (2012). From Stoke Mandeville to Stafford: A history of the Summer Paralympic Games. Illinois. US.
- International Paralympic Committee (2010). "50 Years - Remember Rome". The Paralympian (3). International Paralympic Committee.
