= John Johnston (physiotherapist) =

John Allan "Johno" Johnston MBE was a Scottish-born Australian physiotherapist who played a significant role in the early period of the Australian Paralympic movement.

Johnston emigrated to Australia from Scotland in 1949. He took up a position as a physiotherapist at the Rehabilitation Services and Spinal Unit of Royal Perth Hospital in Shenton Park. In 1954, he introduced sport as part of rehabilitation activities. That year, he had around 5 inpatient paraplegics. In 1970, in recognition of his expertise, he was awarded a Commonwealth Scholarship to study sport as part of rehabilitation. By 1972, he had acquired six assistants as part of his staff. Around that time, Johnston and his staff treated approximately 40 in-patient paraplegics, while also serving variable number of paraplegics as outpatients. Johnston and his staff treated around 43 quadriplegics at the same time. He retired in February 1977 from Royal Perth Hospital and moved to Malaysia.

Johnston played a significant role in the early development of the Australian Paralympic movement. In 1954, he started hosting the National Paraplegic Games out of the Rehabilitation Services and Spinal Unit of Royal Perth Hospital in Shenton . At the 1972 National Paraplegic Games, he served as a trainer for twenty something Western Australian Johnny Dwyer.

In 1957, he managed the first Australian team that participated at the International Stoke Mandeville Games. The team included seven Western Australian men, and Bruce Twaites of Sydney. The Australians returned from Stoke Mandeville with a gold medal and a pair of silvers.

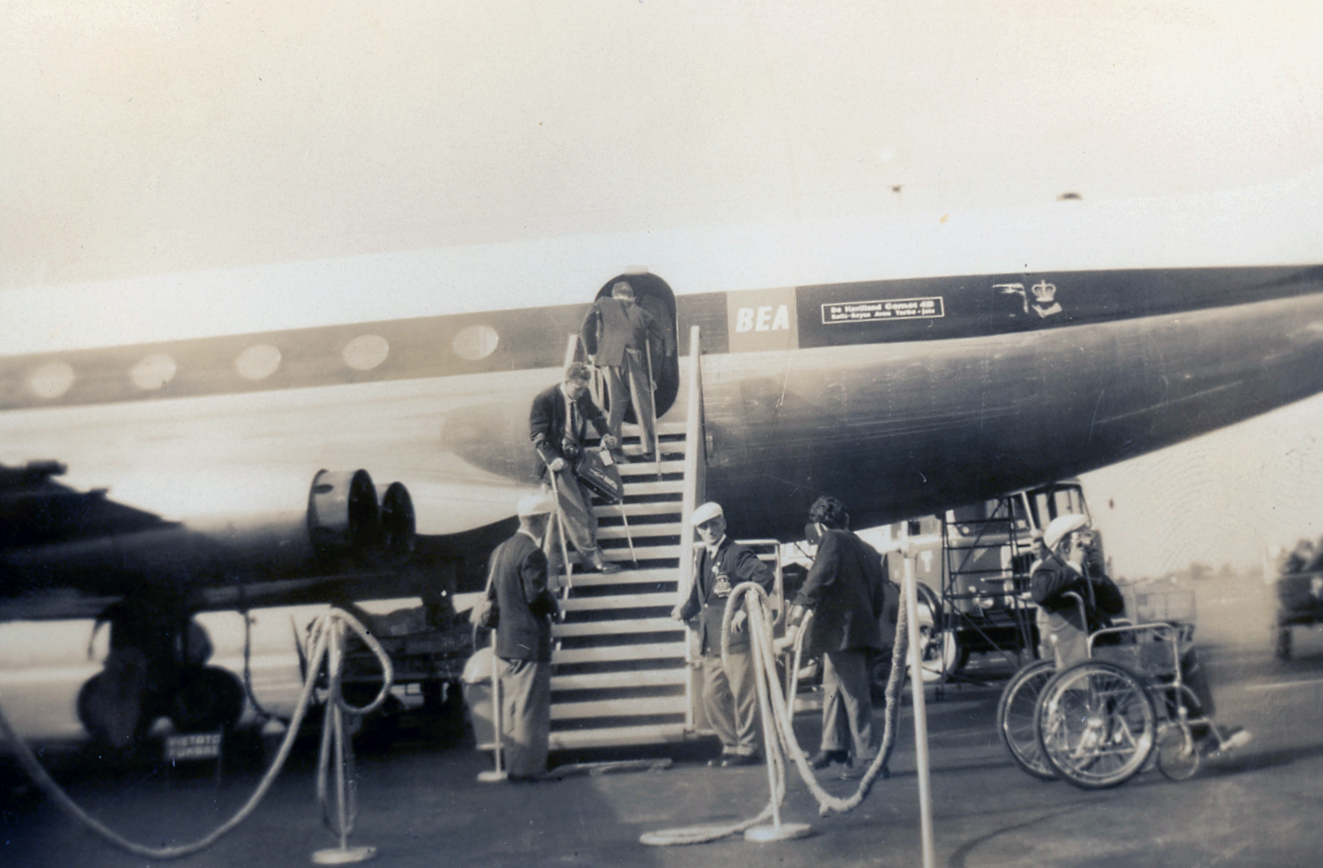
Australian Paralympic Team disembark from their plane on arrival in Rome for the 1960 Rome Paralympic Games. At the bottom of the stairs team official John "Johnno" Johnston in a white gap, turns towards the camera to talk to Bill Mather-Brown, on crutches.

Johnston was the Australian Team Manager at the 1960 Rome, 1964 Tokyo and 1968 Tel Aviv Paralympics. He was in charge of organising the sports program at the 1962 Commonwealth Paraplegic Games held in Perth, Western Australia. These Games raised the profile of paraplegic (spinal cord and polio) athletes in Australia, particularly Western Australia. He also served as the President Paraplegic Sports Committee at Shenton Park Annexe. From this position, he worked to solicit funding to assist in sending an Australian delegation to the 1966 Commonwealth Paraplegic Games in Jamaica.

He served for many years as councillor with ParaplParaplegic-Quadriplegic Association of Western Australia and a member of the Australian Paraplegic and Quadriplegic Council.

Johnston was recognised for his work:

- 1969 - Life Member of Paraplegic-Quadriplegic Association of Western Australia
- 1971 - Member of the Most Excellent Order of the British Empire (MBE) for services to paraplegic sport.
- 1974 - Western Australian Citizen of the Year - Sport

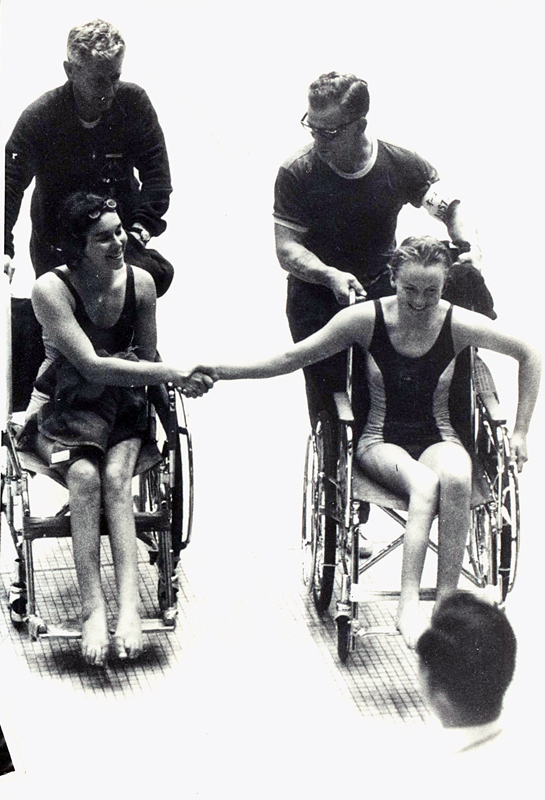
Australian Paralympic Team members Daphne Ceeney (now Hilton) and Elizabeth Edmondson shake hands after Edmondson won gold and Ceeney silver in the 50m prone swimming event at the 1964 Tokyo Paralympic Games. They are pushed by Kevin Betts (Ceeney) and 'Johnno' Johnston (Edmondson)

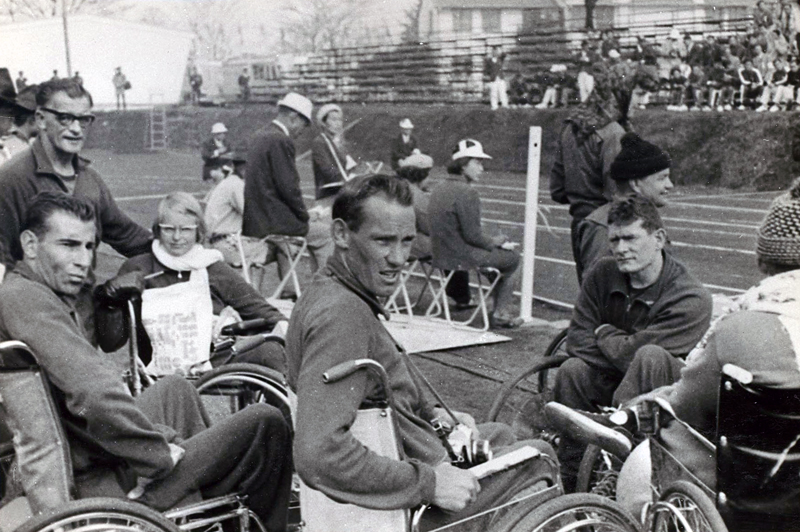
Australian Paralympic Team members in the in-field at the athletics during the 1964 Tokyo Paralympic Games. From left (seated) Frank Ponta, team official John Johnston, Elizabeth Edmondson, unknown and Bill Mather-Brown

== See also ==
- Australia at the Paralympics
