= Frank Ponta =

Australian Paralympic athlete

Personal information
- Full name: Francis Ettore Ponta
- Nationality: Australia
- Born: 8 November 1935 Subiaco, Western Australia
- Died: 1 June 2011 (aged 75) Perth, Australia
Medal record
Men's athletics
Paralympic Games
Silver medal – second place	1960 Rome	Precision Javelin
Wheelchair fencing
Stoke Mandeville Games
Gold medal – first place	1957 Stoke Mandeville	Foil Novice team
Paralympic Games
Silver medal – second place	1960 Rome	Foil Novice Individual
Paralympic swimming
Paralympic Games
Gold medal – first place	1964 Tokyo	25 m freestyle
Bronze medal – third place	1968 Tel Aviv	25 m backstroke

Francis Ettore Ponta (8 November 1935 – 1 June 2011) was an Australian Paralympic competitor and coach. He competed in several sports including basketball, pentathlon, swimming and fencing. A paraplegic, he lost the use of both his legs after a tumour was removed from his spinal column when he was a teenager. Ponta was a member of Australia's first national wheelchair basketball team, and is credited with expanding the sport of wheelchair basketball in Western Australia. At the end of his competitive career, he became a coach, working with athletes such as Louise Sauvage, Priya Cooper, Madison de Rozario, Bruce Wallrodt and Bryan Stitfall. He died on 1 June 2011 at the age of 75 after a long illness.

== Early life and athletic career ==
Ponta was born in the Perth suburb of Subiaco on 8 November 1935, as the eldest of nine children. In 1947 he moved to Geraldton because his father had a job there in the building trade. He attended Christian Brothers schools in Leederville and Geraldton.

At the age of fourteen or fifteen, he injured his back while diving off a wharf in Geraldton, which aggravated a tumour in his spinal column. The tumour was diagnosed when he was 17 and after it was removed, he lost the use of both his legs. He entered the spinal injury ward at Royal Perth Hospital in 1954 for rehabilitation, where he was trained in sports by John "Johno" Johnston.

When Ponta began his competitive career, he played several sports, in common with most paraplegic athletes at the time. He competed in basketball, pentathlon, swimming and fencing. Ponta was a member of the first national wheelchair basketball team for Australia, formed in 1956, mostly composed of players from the spinal injury ward of Royal Perth Hospital.

== Competitive athletic career ==
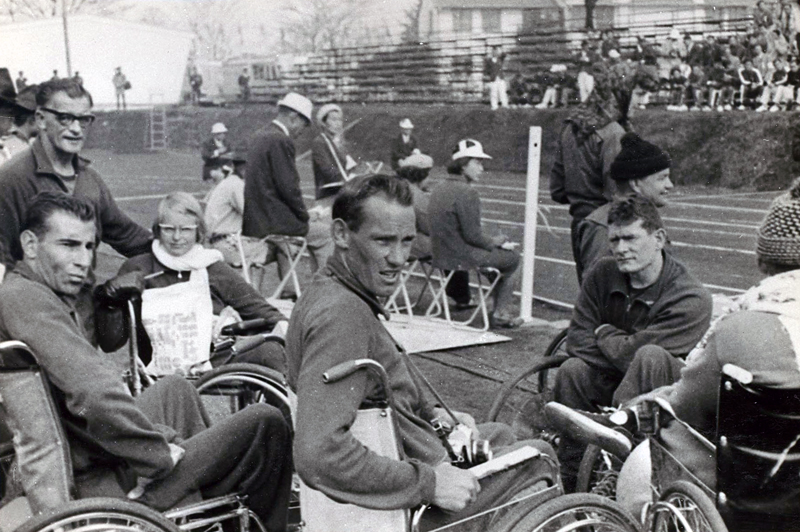
Australian Paralympic Team members in the in-field at the athletics during the 1964 Tokyo Paralympic Games. From left (seated) Frank Ponta, team official John Johnston, Elizabeth Edmondson, unknown and Bill Mather-Brown

In 1957, Ponta competed at the Stoke Mandeville Games, the precursor to the Paralympic Games. He and teammate Bill Mather-Brown won a gold medal in Foil Novice team at the wheelchair fencing event. In the same year, Ponta and Mather-Brown also competed at the Welsh Challenge Cup, where the pair also won gold.

Ponta competed in five Paralympic Games, including the first one held in Rome in 1960. As a Paralympic competitor, he won a gold medal, two silver medals and a bronze medal. He competed in several sports including wheelchair racing, wheelchair fencing, swimming and wheelchair basketball.

At the 1960 Summer Paralympics, he competed in the Men's Precision Javelin, where he won a silver medal. He was a member of the Australian wheelchair basketball team at the 1962 Commonwealth Paraplegic Games in Perth. At the 1964 Summer Paralympics in Tokyo, Ponta competed in Class 2 Men's swimming in the 25 m breaststroke event, where he failed to medal. At those same games, he also competed in the class 2 Men's 25 m Freestyle Supine event, where he won a gold medal. He also competed in wheelchair fencing at the 1964 Games in the Eppee Team event, where he did not medal, and the Men's Foil Novice Individual, where he won a silver medal. At the 1968 Tel Aviv Games, he competed in the Class 2 Men's 25 m Breaststroke event, where he failed to medal. He also competed in the Men's 25 m Backstroke, where he won a bronze medal. He also competed in the 100 m Wheelchair race, the pentathlon complete, precision javelin open, slalom a, and in the wheelchair basketball team. He did not medal in any of these events.

He competed without winning a medal at the 1972 Heidelberg Games in the discus, javelin, precision javelin, and the wheelchair basketball team. At the 1976 Toronto Games, he competed in the discus, javelin, pentathlon, precision javelin, and shot put events, and was also part of the wheelchair basketball team. He did not medal in any of these events.

== Coaching career ==
Sometimes Rita and other parents thought I was too tough on kids. 'You push them too hard.' they'd say. 'Bloody rubbish,' I'd respond. 'If we don't do it this way we're never going to get anything out of them and they're never going to learn and improve.' Yes, I've pushed kids through the barriers that exist. Mainly I just give them the facts: 'You've got to work hard … you've got to train four or five days a week'.

— Frank Ponta

Ponta coached several medal winning Paralympic athletes including Louise Sauvage and Priya Cooper. He was Sauvage's first coach, starting when Sauvage was a junior competitor. Sauvage described Ponta's coaching style as patient.

Ponta was influential in developing junior wheelchair sports in Western Australia and the rest of the country. Ponta pushed junior athletes to make something of themselves and put an emphasis on sportsmanship. He is described by the Western Australian government as having devoted his life to the Wheelchair Sport Association as a coach and role model.

One of Ponta's coaching skills was identifying which events that junior athletes would excel at. He did this with several athletes, including Sauvage. He transformed her from a sprinter to a middle and long distance competitor.

Ponta coached Madison de Rozario, who won a medal at the 2008 Paralympic Games. de Rozario considers Frank Ponta one of her heroes. In 2003 and 2004, he coached athletics competitors Bruce Wallrodt and Bryan Stitfall, who had won a Western Australian Institute of Sport scholarship.

== Wheelchair basketball ==
Ponta is credited with developing wheelchair basketball in Western Australia. He is described as a pioneer of the sport. Organisations such as Australian Athletes With A Disability credit Ponta with being a driving force for the development of the sport in Western Australia. He is considered by organisations such as Disability Services Australia as one of the greatest wheelchair basketball players ever.

The Frank Ponta Trophy tournament was introduced by Basketball Australia in 2010.

Ponta coached the Western Australian youth team. He would remove any players who did not show good sportsmanship.

== Personal life ==
Ponta married Margaret, a nurse, in 1962. They had four children: Mark, Andrew, Tanya, and Jamie.

In July 2008, he had a stroke, which restricted his movement to his right arm and left him "virtually bedridden". Shortly after his stroke, he tried to get admitted to the quadriplegic centre in the Royal Perth Hospital Shenton Park Campus. His request was denied, despite having been one of the first patients at the campus. Several high-profile individuals tried to intercede on his behalf including Sue Ellery, Louise Sauvage and Bill Mather-Brown. The hospital argued against admission on the grounds that Ponta was not a quadriplegic and should have been admitted to an aged care centre instead.

He died on 1 June 2011 in Perth after a long illness, at the age of 75.

== Recognition ==
Sport has been a big part of my life with many ups and downs. An outlet for frustration and a challenge either in playing, coaching or administration. I enjoyed my time as a competitor, but have had almost as much pleasure watching people that I have trained become achievers.

— Frank Ponta

Ponta received the Sir Ludwig Guttman Award in 1984, and the Lord's Taverners Award in 1989, from Wheelchair Sports Australia. He received the Australian Sports Medal in 2000; his citation said: "Basketball Paralympian - huge contribution to Junior w/c sports - team selector, team mgr coach".

In 2003, at the Wheelchair Sports WA Annual Awards, Ponta was named the Coach of the Year. He received the Western Australian Citizen of the Year Award in 2007. In 2011, he was one of the first people to be inducted into the Australian Paralympian Hall of Fame, along with Louise Sauvage and George Bedbrook. In 2012, he was inducted into the International Paralympian Hall of Fame at a ceremony in London. In 2017, he was inducted into the Sport Australia Hall of Fame as an Athlete and General Member.
