= Joan Scruton =

Secretary General of International Stoke Mandeville Games Federation
- In office 1975–1982

Personal details
- Born: 1918 Yorkshire, England
- Died: 1 November 2007 (aged 88–89)

Joan Scruton MBE (1918 - 1 November 2007) was an organizing member of the International Stoke Mandeville Games from 1952 to 1968, which became the Paralympic Games in 1960. Apart from the games, Scruton was secretary general at the International Stoke Mandeville Games Federation from 1975 to 1982. Scruton was named a Member of the Most Excellent Order of the British Empire in 1975 and awarded the Paralympic Order in 1999.

== Early life and education ==
Joan Scruton was born in 1918 in Yorkshire, England.

== Career ==
In 1942, Scruton began working at the Ministry of Pensions Hospital as a secretary. A few years later, Scruton was hired in 1944 to work with Dr. Ludwig Guttmann at the Stoke Mandeville Hospital. During her time at Stoke Mandeville, she administrated the National Spinal Injuries Centre at the hospital. After a brief stint at the National Health Service, Scruton was named Secretary General of the British Paraplegic Sports Society. She remained as secretary general until retiring from her position in 1988.

Outside of her healthcare career, Scruton co-assembled the International Stoke Mandeville Games and Paralympic Games from 1952 until 1968. At the International Stoke Mandeville Games Federation, she was a secretary general from 1975 to 1982 but remained at the federation until 1993. Scruton wrote the book Stoke Mandeville: Road to the Paralympics about her role in the Paralympics.

== Awards and honours ==
In 1975, Scruton was named a Member of the Most Excellent Order of the British Empire. In 1984, she was awarded the Pursuit Trophy by the International Wheelchair and Amputee Sports Federation. and was given the Paralympic Order in 1999.

== Death ==
Scruton died on 1 November 2007.
