= 1962 Commonwealth Paraplegic Games =

I Commonwealth Paraplegic Games
- Host city: Perth, Western Australia
- Nations: 9
- Athletes: 93
- Sport: 14
- Events: 88
- Opening: 10 November
- Closing: 17 November
- Opened by: Sir Charles Gairdner, Governor of Western Australia
- Main venue: Royal Agricultural Showground

The First Commonwealth Paraplegic Games were held in Perth, Western Australia, from 10 to 17 November 1962. These Games preceded the 1962 British Empire and Commonwealth Games which were held in Perth from 22 November to 1 December of that year. The Commonwealth Paraplegic Games were conceived by George Bedbrook after Perth won the right to host the Commonwealth Games. Great support was received from Royal Perth Hospital, a leading spinal rehabilitation centre in Australia.

These games raised the profile of paraplegic (spinal cord and polio) athletes in Australia, particularly Western Australia. The chairman of the Organising Committee, Hugh Leslie, who had lost a leg in World War II, gave a speech aimed to change public perceptions about disabilities by addressing the power of language. These games, he told the audience, "were designed to prove to the public that the person who was bodily handicapped was not a cripple, and he hoped that that horrible word would eventually be wiped out of use. He had a slogan which he hoped would be adopted by all disabled: 'I can, I will'".

Leading officials such as Bedbrook, the founder of the Stoke Mandeville Games, were impressed with the spectator turnout. Although the standards were lower than those of the Stoke Mandeville Games, there were some outstanding individual performances and several world records were broken.

== Background and administration ==
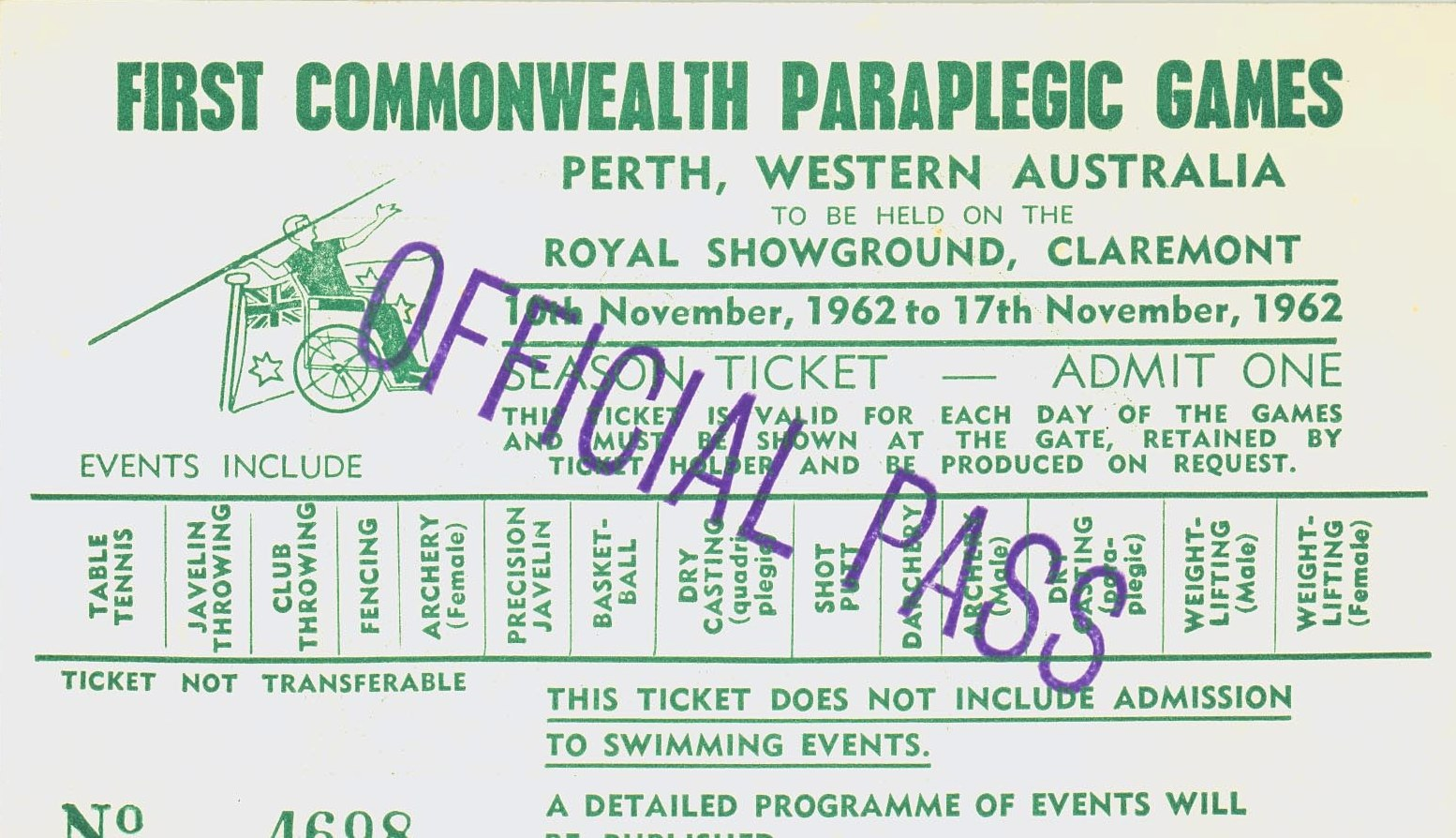
The official pass for the 1962 Commonwealth Paraplegic Games

It was decided to hold the games in Perth because the city was to host the 1962 British Empire and Commonwealth Games and Royal Perth Hospital had a well developed spinal unit that could support paraplegic athletes. The Commonwealth Paraplegic Games were held before the main Games as to not impact on this event and provide the opportunity for athletes to stay on for the main Games.

The Royal Perth Hospital board of management were the official sponsors of the event and established an organising committee in 1959. The Australian Paraplegic Council was not formed until February 1962. The main members of the organising committee were Hugh Leslie (executive chairman), George Bedbrook (general secretary) and M.R. Fathers (secretary). The appointment of Hugh Leslie, a leg amputee, as chairman was important due to his influence as a member of the Parliament of Australia, his previous experience with paraplegic sporting teams and as a champion of people with a disability.

The organising committee paid for all costs incurred in Australia to participating countries. They were only required to pay their transport and stop over costs to and from Australia. Other Australian states were consulted and requested to provide funding of A£9,250. The specific state funding quotas were £2,500 for Victoria, £2,500 for New South Wales, £2,600 for Western Australia, £1,000 for Queensland and £450 for South Australia. There was a concern as to not impact on the fundraising required by the Commonwealth Games appeal. Several reports of the games highlight the importance of large spectator attendance and 'passing the hat' around in the fundraising efforts. The total cost at the games was £11,717 with a surplus of £2,089.

== Ceremonies ==
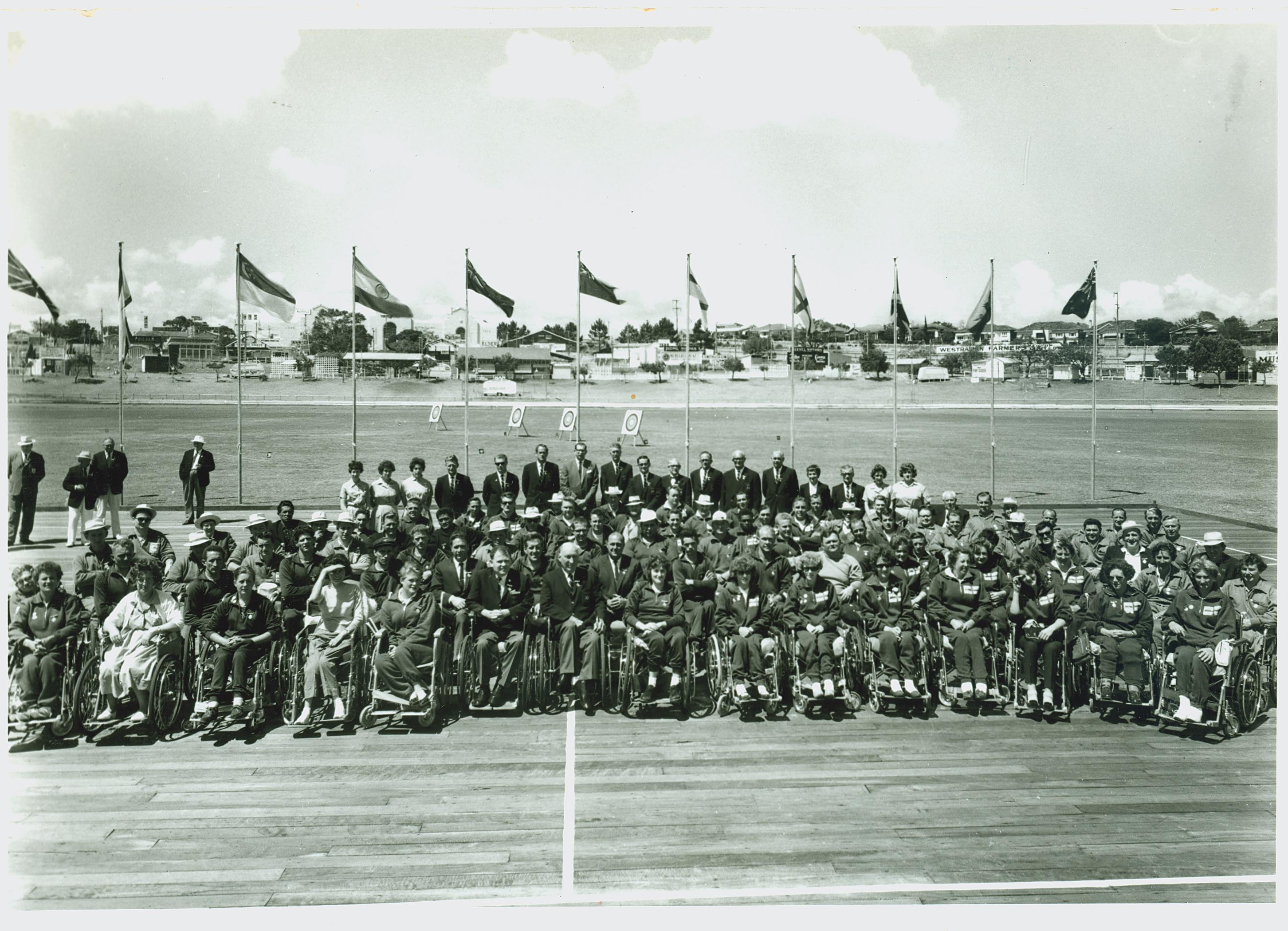
1962 Commonwealth Paraplegic Games competitors

=== Opening ===
The games were opened by the Governor of Western Australia, Sir Charles Gairdner, on 10 November 1962. In his opening speech, Gairdner stated that "the public must learn that the handicapped person is not an invalid. I am handicapped, but the one thing I loathe is for people to treat me as an invalid. We, the public, must realise what can be done to rehabilitate people who have suffered a grievous physical disadvantage".

The opening ceremony was described as a "colourful spectacle" due to the Army's Western Command Band wearing scarlet jackets and white helmets, the Army Guard of Honour in jungle green clothing and the blue uniforms of the mounted escort. The order of the wheelpast was Singapore, India, New Zealand, Rhodesia, Wales, Northern Ireland, England and the host country Australia. Hugh Leslie, the games chairman, in his speech said "This event, apart from helping the participants, is designed to prove to the public that the person who is badly handicapped is not a cripple. I hope that this horrible word will eventually be wiped out of use." Senator Shane Paltridge, who was representing the Federal Government, said "This is one fine example of leadership taken by this State in the work to lift the paraplegic from a life of resignation to one of self respect and purpose in the community."

The second half of the opening ceremony and the start of the competitive program was a basketball match between Australia and England. The game was played on a special court, constructed of timber flooring laid on a sand base, at the Agricultural Showgrounds in full view of the crowd in the grandstand. In front of a couple of thousand spectators, with the game being called on the public address system by a television sports commentator, Allan Terry, the Australians beat the English by a single basket (20–18). The atmosphere was summarised in The Australian Paraplegic: "The spectacle of the opening ceremony and wheelpast, followed by the excitement of the basketball, sent spectators home well rewarded for their attendance at the opening day of the First Commonwealth Paraplegic Games." The ceremony and the game received wide television, radio and newspaper coverage highlighting the importance of the event in rehabilitation.

=== Closing ===
The closing ceremony, before a near-capacity crowd of 3,500, had the colour of the opening, with 35 marching bands (400 girls) and Scottish bands. The crowd had been present for the recently completed basketball final game. A DC-7B aircraft, chartered by the British teams, conducted a fly past. Sir Ludwig Guttman, founder of the Paralympic Games, in his closing address, thanked Australia and stated that "What has been the most gratifying achievement is that the First Commonwealth Paraplegic Games have fulfilled the aims and ideals of the Stoke Mandeville Games in furthering friendship and understanding among various nations of the Commonwealth." Guttman presented George Bedbrook with the Stoke Mandeville pennant in recognition for the organisation of the games. Each team then wheeled past the dais to the famous Australian song "Waltzing Matilda". Sir Arthur Porritt, chairman of the British Empire and Commonwealth Games Federation, declared the games closed. In his speech, he told the audience that he hoped the general public would continue to support paraplegics and their movement.

== Logistics and insignia ==
The original plan was to hold the games at the Shenton Park Annexe of Royal Perth Hospital but this was abandoned due to the need for temporary buildings. The Royal Agricultural Showground in the suburb of Claremont was used as it had an oval and buildings for accommodation and events. A major advantage of the venue was that all facilities were on one level. There was no suitable facility for basketball and after much debate a wooden court was laid on a sand foundation in front of the main grandstand. Beatty Park was used for swimming events.

Pamela McCarthy, one of India's two athletes, made the following comment on the showground facilities: "This communal living was ideal for getting to know one and another and for making friends; every conceivable facility was provided at the Showgrounds – such as television lounge, a shop, post office, bank, laundry and even a ladies hairdresser."

The organising committee decided at the outset that transport would be a major issue and ultimately reflect on the success of the games. The decision to locate most of the events and accommodation at the showgrounds reduced many of the issues. Car companies in Perth made cars available and volunteer drivers assisted in taking athletes and officials around Perth, particularly to Beatty Park. The biggest issue was encountered by teams from the United Kingdom that had to travel 20,000 miles (32,000 km). A total of 57 athletes and 23 escorts travelled from the United Kingdom in a chartered Caledonian Airways plane at the cost of GB£18,500. The long flight required refuelling in Bahrain and a stop over in Colombo, Ceylon. Health checks such as measuring legs and ankles for swelling were undertaken during the flight to Perth and back home.

A major logistical effort was required to transport the 80 member team to the Showgrounds on arrival at Perth airport. Royal Perth Hospital's special coach, a Red Cross bus, private cars and a truck to carry wheelchairs were used.

The flag was the games emblem of a javelin thrower in a wheelchair with a background outline of the flag of Australia on a flagpole in a slight breeze. Medals had one side with the games emblem and the reverse side name of sport with room for engraving. Badges were given to each competitor and official with the aims of identification and access to the dining hall. The badge also became a memento of the games.

== Participating teams ==
A total of 89 athletes from nine countries competed. The countries represented and their allocated colours were: England (dark blue), India (light green), New Zealand (pink), Northern Ireland (dark green), Rhodesia (light blue), Scotland (black), Singapore (red), Wales (white) and Australia (gold). The only major Commonwealth country not represented was Canada, which decided not to attend.

Many athletes competed in several sports because each country selected their team based on the versatility of sporting ability to reduce their team size and hence costs.

The teams were:

Australia (24 athletes)
Men: M. Bazeley, Frank Ponta, Bruno Moretti, Ross Sutton, John 'Jimmy' Newton, Gary Hooper, Bruce Thwaite, Bill Mather-Brown, Vic Renalson, R. Maxwell, D. Tinsley, Chris O'Brien, Alan Yeomans, Don Watts, J. Gidney, Roger Cockerill, Kevin Cunningham, John Turich, John Rein, Alan Robertson (Captain), G. Coombes
Women: Lorraine Dodd, Margaret Ross, Daphne Ceeney
England (31 athletes)
Men: Richard (Dick) Hollick, Anthony (Tony) Potter, Stefan Gawanick, R. Foster, T. Moran, Dick Thompson, J. Redgewick, F. Crowder, M. Shelton, John Buck, J. Chilcott, J. Thompson, T. Palmer, R. Rowe, J. Gibson, R. Scott, B. Dickinson, Peter McCranor, D. Pickering
Women: Sally Haynes, Janet Laughton, A. Masson, Lady Susan Masham, Shelagh Jones, Gwen. Buck, Margaret Maughan, V. Forder, Daisy Flint, Marion Edwards, P. Foulds
Scotland (15 athletes)
Men: B. Hunt, Jimmy Laird, J.G. Robertson, Alastair Shields, T. Guthrie, N. Macdonald, John Robertson, J. Sloway, P. Stanton, J. Whitefield, J. Hendry, I. Niblo, J. Robinson
Women: M. Taylor, R. Harvey
Wales (9 athletes)
Men: George Cockeram, Dudley Phillips, D. Winters, O. Hughes, E. Lidster, F. Barnes, L. Walker, T. Smart.
Women: Gaynor Harry
Rhodesia (4 athletes)
Men: George Mann, L. Manson Bishop
Women: Lynne Gilchrist, Margaret Harriman
India (2 athletes)
Men: Blavant V. Shah – listed in programme but not mentioned in wheelpast
Women: Pamela McCarthy
New Zealand (2 athletes)
Men: Pompi Heremaia, Wilf Martin
Northern Ireland (2 athletes)
Men: Raymond Deans
Women: Pat Vizard
Singapore (1 athlete)
Men: Abdul Wahid bin Baba

Source: Official Programme. Approximately 40 attendants assisted the teams.

== Medals ==
There were fourteen events – archery, dartchery, javelin throw, precision javelin, club throw, shot put, swimming, weightlifting, pentathlon, fencing, snooker, basketball and table tennis.

Medal table by country, with totals
Country	Gold	Silver	Bronze	Total
Australia	38	29	23	90
England	30	41	19	90
Rhodesia	15	3	5	23
Scotland	2	10	4	16
New Zealand	2	0	0	2
Wales	1	0	1	2
India	1	0	2	3
Singapore	0	0	0	0
Northern Ireland	0	0	0	0
Total	89	83	54	226

Not all events awarded silver and bronze medals due to insufficient competitors.

== Awards ==
Seven awards were presented during the games that reflected sporting excellence and personal endeavour.

- Lorraine Dodd from Australia was presented the Ben Richter Award for "the physically handicapped person to have made the best effort to rehabilitate himself or herself".
- Australia won the Royal Perth Hospital Paraplegic Unit Trophy for the winning country.
- Singapore and Northern Ireland were awarded the Special Merit Award; both countries failed to win a medal.
- Rhodesia won the Best Team Performance, with 15 gold, 3 silver and 5 bronze medals with four team members.
- Dick Thompson from England and Kevin Cunningham won the Australian Paraplegic Council Trophy for winning pentathlon events.
- George Mann from Rhodesia won the trophy for the performance based on degree of physical disability. This trophy was donated by World Rehabilitation Fund in New York.
- The Australian Basketball team won the Gordon Gooch Trophy. Gooch was the games Patron.

== Participant reflections and legacy ==
Reflections from athletes and officials provide an insight into the value of this inaugural event. Bill Mather-Brown, an Australian athlete, said "The 1962 Games was the first time I had been asked for an autograph. We regarded it as a compliment. We were mobbed, especially at the swimming pool. Sometimes we were not sure people really wanted our signature or were just being polite and wanted us to feel good".

John Buck, an English athlete, said this about his reason for attending the games: "I had been in Perth during the war years serving as an engine room artificer on H.M. submarine Thule and had the misfortune to pick up one of those endearing Australian bugs which left me in a rather poor state of health (e.g. a paraplegic)". He wanted to go back to Perth to see the Stitt family who looked after him in Perth.

Bill Elson, an English support official, commented on the large swimming crowds " For many, this must have been a first introduction to swimming by the paralysed, and I felt that many were wondering whether paralysed persons could swim 50 metres – how many would fail to make the distance and it was all just a stunt to enlist their sympathies and raise money". The crowd's thunderous applause made the official more comfortable about the event.

Gaynor Harry, an athlete from Wales, wrote "Then was the moment to think of the fabulous organization that went into the games, from start to finish there wasn't a hitch. If we needed a postage stamp, that was easy. If licking the back of it had given us a thirst for iced water, that was easy too. The highest tribute that can be paid is that it all appeared so effortless, as though it all just happened".

Richard Hollick, an athlete from England, highlighted the importance of the games in self-development " Not only do we enjoy ourselves but we also learnt more about adapting ourselves than we probably normally learn in a year". Many athletes had to travel large distances to attend the games.

Shelagh Jones, an athlete from England, wrote of the nature of competition " As the various sports on the program got under way, more and more we realised a full-blooded fight was on. The swimming, fencing and field events arrived at the top of the sportscard in next-to-no-time and in these games we found success and failure, humour and disappointment, laughter and tears. Yet within this tiny cross section of life I shall never forget the honour and privilege of mounting the rostrum to collect a 'gold' for England."

These Games raised the profile of paraplegic (spinal cord and polio) athletes in Australia, particularly Western Australia. The spectator attendance amazed leading officials such as Ludwig Guttmann, the founder of the Stoke Mandeville Games. He commented that the attendance was the best he had seen at any paraplegic sports event in the world. The games highlighted the versatility of the athletes with many winning medals in different sports. It was noted that generally the standard of performance was below that of the Stoke Mandeville Games; however there were several outstanding performers including Vic Renalson, Bill Mather-Brown, Lorraine Dodd, M. Bazeley, Lynne Gilchrist and R. Scott who broke records in their events. A film of the games was made.
