= Kevin Cunningham (Paralympian) =

Australian Paralympic athlete (1939–2023)

Personal information
- Full name: Kevin Cunningham
- Nationality: Australia
- Born: 11 August 1939
- Died: 4 January 2023 (aged 83)

Kevin Cunningham (11 August 1939 – 4 January 2023) was an Australian Paralympic athlete. A member of Australia's first Paralympic Games team, he participated at the 1960 Rome and 1968 Tel Aviv Paralympic Games.

== Personal ==
Kevin Cunningham was born in Perth, Western Australia on 11 August 1939. His parents were Irene and Edward. His mother Irene died when he was six and was brought up by his grandmother. He attended Jolimont School and Perth Technical College. He undertook an apprenticeship at SW Hart & Company. In 1957, he was involved in a motor vehicle accident and thrown out of T-Model Ford. He was in a coma for three weeks. His rehabilitation was undertaken at the Shenton Park Rehabilitation Centre. In 1966, he married Maureen, a nurse from Shenton Park Rehabilitation Centre.

Cunningham died on 4 January 2023, at the age of 83.

== Career ==
=== Paralympic Games ===
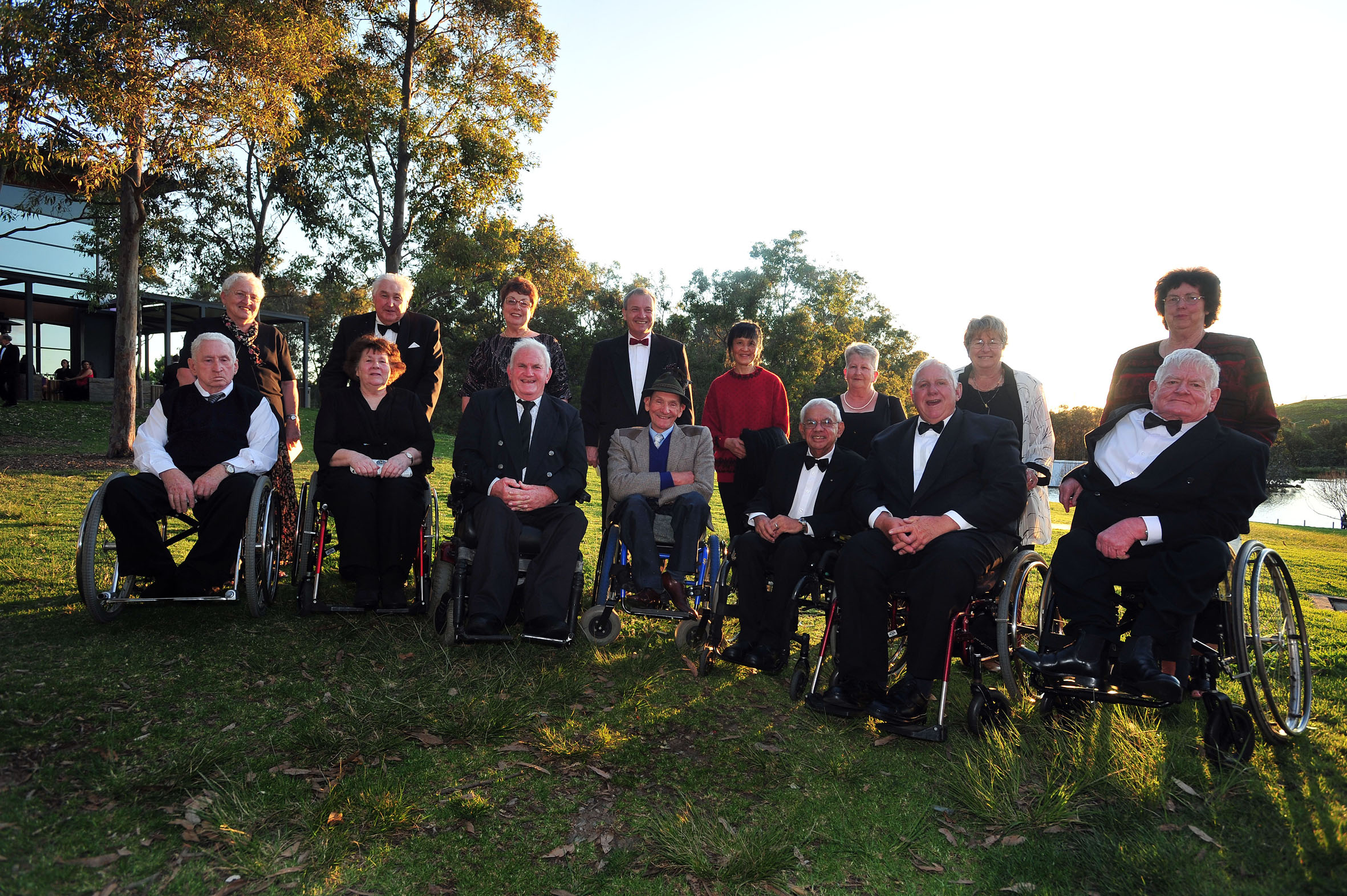
Seven of the members of the 1960 Australian Paralympic Team - the first - at the reunion to mark the 50th anniversary of the Games. L to R (athlete and partner): Chris O'Brien with his sister, Daphne Hilton (née Ceeney) with husband Frank, Gary Hooper with wife Jan, APC President Greg Hartung (standing in dinner suit), Bruno Moretti with wife Scarlett, Kevin Coombs with wife Linda, Kevin Cunningham with wife Maureen, and Bill Mather-Brown with wife Nadine

Cunningham's interest in Paralympic sport stemmed from his time at Shenton Park Rehabilitation Centre where he witnessed residents training for the International Stoke Mandeville Games. He participated at the 1960 Rome Games, in wheelchair fencing and wheelchair basketball. He was not selected for 1964 Tokyo Games due to an injury in selection trials in Adelaide. He participated in the 1968 Tel Aviv Games in men's slalom C in athletics and wheelchair basketball. Cunningham won silver medals in both of these events.

Whilst celebrating 50 years of Paralympic sport, in 2010, Cunningham was honoured as a member of the Australian wheelchair basketball team which competed at the 1960 Rome Games alongside his teammates; Kevin Coombs, Gary Hooper, Bill Mather-Brown, Bruno Moretti, and Chris O'Brien (pictured on the right).

=== Commonwealth Paraplegic Games ===
Cunningham participated in three Commonwealth Paraplegic Games. At the 1962 Perth Games, he competed in many events and won gold medals in the pentathlon and men's wheelchair basketball. At the 1966 Kingston Games, he won a gold medal in track relay, 3 silver and two bronze medals in basketball and track and field events. He competed at the 1970 Games in Edinburgh, Scotland and then retired from Paralympic sport.
