= Lorraine Dodd =

Australian Paralympic swimmer, athlete and table tennis player

Lorraine McCoulough-Fry (née Dodd)
Personal information
- Nationality: Australia
- Born: 6 September 1944 Subiaco, Western Australia
- Died: 26 November 2004 (aged 60)
Medal record
Swimming
Paralympic Games
| Gold medal – first place | 1968 Tel Aviv | Women's 25 m Breaststroke Class 2 Complete |
| Gold medal – first place | 1968 Tel Aviv | Women's 25 m Backstroke Class 2 Complete |
| Gold medal – first place | 1968 Tel Aviv | Women's 25 m Freestyle Class 2 Complete |
Athletics
Paralympic Games
| Silver medal – second place | 1968 Tel Aviv | Women's Slalom A |
| Bronze medal – third place | 1968 Tel Aviv | Women's Novices 60 m Wheelchair Dash A |

Lorraine McCoulough-Fry (née Dodd) (6 September 1944 – 26 November 2004) was an Australian Paralympic swimmer, athlete and table tennis player.

== Personal ==
Dodd was born in the Perth suburb of Subiaco on 6 September 1944, as the youngest of five children. She became a paraplegic at the age of 13 after contracting transverse myelitis, which confined her to a wheelchair. After contracting the disease, she undertook rehabilitation which included archery and swimming at the Royal Perth Hospital Shenton Park Annexe. This was the start of her sporting career. After treatment at the hospital, she returned to school at Mount Lawley High School and then passed the Junior Examination at the University of Western Australia. in 1966, she met Ian McCoulough-Fry after he was admitted to the Shenton Park annex of Royal Perth Hospital after an accident in a bakery where he was working . She married him in 1970 and he died in 1989. They adopted a son, Matthew. She worked for 25 years in the office of Koondoola Special School, now known as Burbridge School. She was involved with disability issues with the Public Transport Authority and assisted community groups such as Wheelchair Sports WA, the Abilympics, and Business and Professional Women. She died on 26 November 2004.

== Career ==
Dodd competed at the 1962 Commonwealth Paraplegic Games in Perth winning seven gold and two silver medals. For her performances at the Games, she was awarded the Ben Richter Award for the person to have made the best effort to rehabilitate themselves. She worked as an honorary assistant secretary to the Games Organising Committee. After the Games, she was employed as a shorthand typist at the University Department of Medicine at Royal Perth Hospital.

She did not compete at the 1964 Tokyo Games due to health problems. At the 1966 Commonwealth Paraplegic Games in Kingston, Jamaica, she won six gold medals: three in swimming in freestyle, backstroke and breaststroke and three in athletics in the javelin, discus and club throw, and two bronze medals in shot put and slalom events. At the 1968 Tel Aviv Games, she won three gold medals and broke world records in the Women's 25 m Backstroke class 2 complete, Women's 25 m Breaststroke class 2 complete, and Women's 25 m Freestyle class 2 complete events, a silver medal in the Women's Slalom A event, and a bronze medal in the Women's Novices 60 m Wheelchair Dash A event. She also competed in the Women's Singles B – event in table tennis. Injury forced her to withdraw from the 1970 Commonwealth Paraplegic Games in Edinburgh, and she retired from competition in that year because she could not train after spinal surgery. "She was coached by Tony Howson."

== Recognition ==
- 1996 – inducted into the Western Australian Hall of Champions.
- 2009 – inducted into the Swimming Western Australia Hall of Fame.
