= Bill Mather-Brown =

Australian Paralympic athlete (1936–2025)

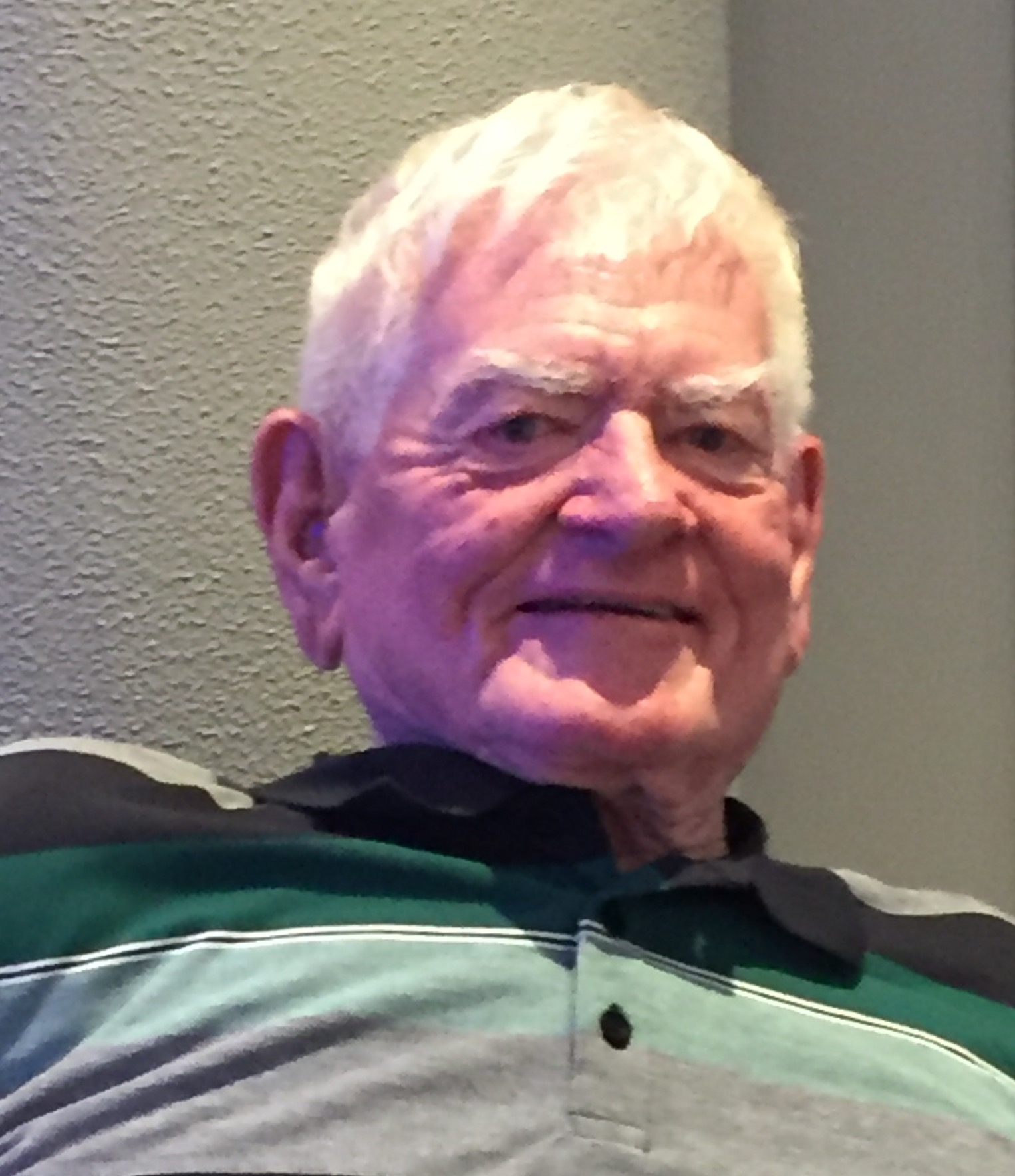

Personal information
- Full name: William Edgar Mather-Brown
- Nationality: Australia
- Born: 14 April 1936 Fremantle, Western Australia, Australia
- Died: 17 August 2025 (aged 89)
Medal record
Table tennis
Paralympic Games
Silver medal – second place	1960 Rome	Men's Doubles Class B
Commonwealth Paraplegic Games
Gold medal – first place	1962 Perth	Men's Doubles Class B
Silver medal – second place	1962 Perth	Men's Singles Class B
Athletics
Paralympic Games
Silver medal – second place	1968 Tel Aviv	Men's Slalom A
Commonwealth Paraplegic Games
Bronze medal – third place	1962 Perth	Men's Shot Put Class B
Wheelchair basketball
Commonwealth Paraplegic Games
Gold medal – first place	1962 Perth	Men's Competition
Swimming
Commonwealth Paraplegic Games
Gold medal – first place	1962 Perth	Men's Backstroke 50 m Class C
Silver medal – second place	1962 Perth	Men's Crawl 50 m Class C
Weightlifting
Commonwealth Paraplegic Games
Gold medal – first place	1962 Perth	Men's Lightweight Class B

William Edgar Mather-Brown (14 April 1936 – 17 August 2025) was an Australian Paralympian. A member of the Australian team at the inaugural 1960 Rome Paralympics, he went on to win two medals at three Paralympics, along with seven medals at the 1962 Perth Commonwealth Paraplegic Games.

== Background ==
Mather-Brown was born in the Western Australian city of Fremantle on 14 April 1936. He contracted polio in 1938 aged 2 in the town of Agnew in the Goldfields, Northeast of Kalgoorlie. He spent two years in the Kalgoorlie Hospital before moving back to Perth. He married Nadine Vine on 6 January 1967, who attended the 1972 Heidelberg Games as a team nurse. They had two children.

He published two books of verse, From My Destined Way in 1983 and Songs of the Possum and Other Verses in 1994.

Mather-Brown died on 17 August 2025, at the age of 89. He was the last living member of Australia's 1960 Paralympic team.

== Paralympic Games ==
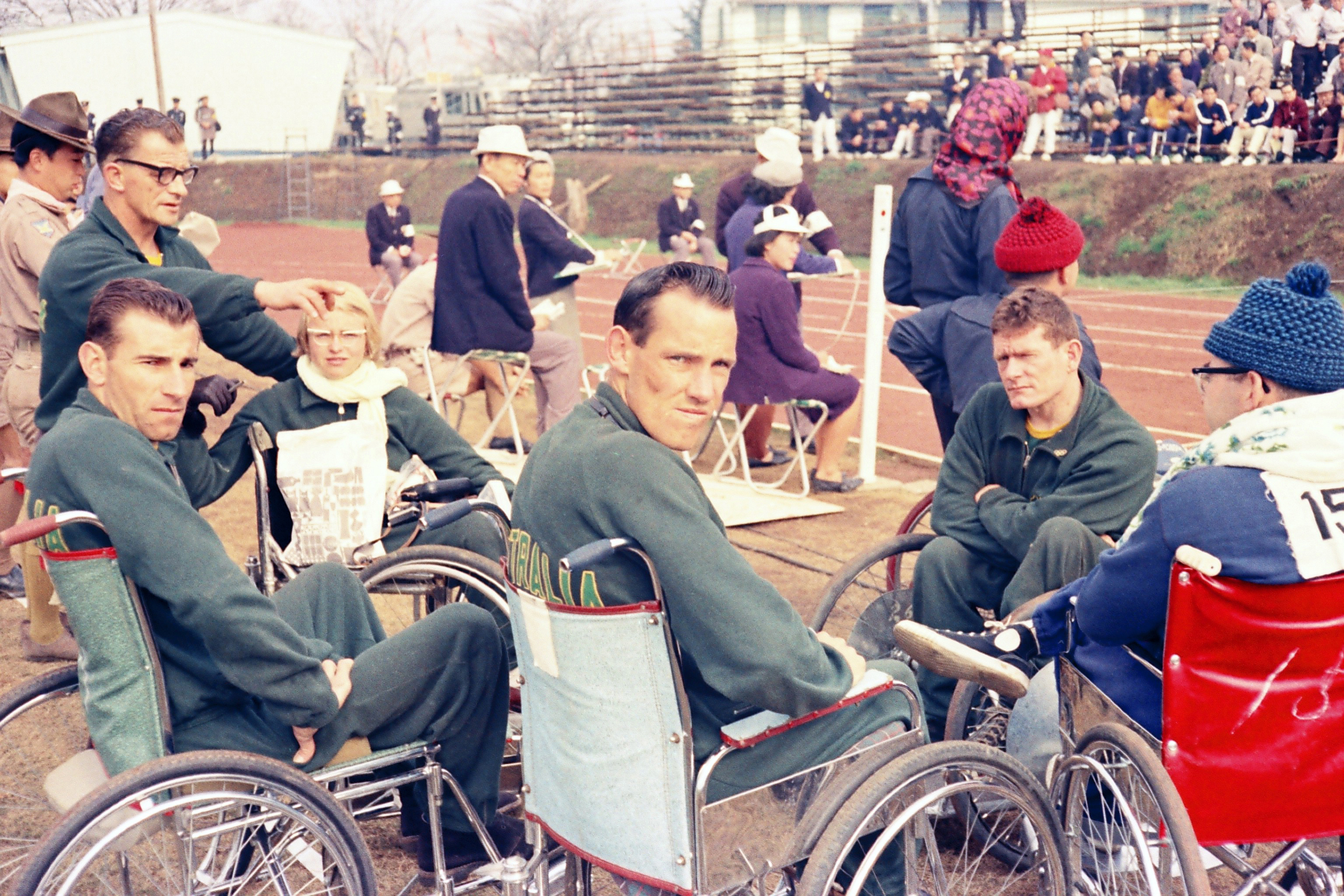
Australian Paralympic Team members in the in-field at the athletics during the 1964 Tokyo Paralympic Games. From left (seated) Frank Ponta, team official John Johnston, Elizabeth Edmondson, Lionel Cousens and Bill Mather-Brown

He had a lifelong interest in sport and joined wheelchair sports in 1955. He went to the Stoke Mandeville games in 1957 and competed in several sports. At the 1960 Rome Paralympics, he won a silver medal in Men's Class B table tennis with Bruno Moretti and participated in the Australia men's national wheelchair basketball team. At the 1964 Tokyo Paralympics, he participated in wheelchair fencing as part of the Men's Épée Team. At the 1968 Tel Aviv Paralympics, he won a silver medal in the Men's Slalom A event and participated in swimming, table tennis and wheelchair basketball events.

== Commonwealth Paraplegic Games ==
Mather-Brown competed at the 1962 Commonwealth Paraplegic Games in his home town of Perth. He won medals in four sports. In weightlifting he won the gold medal in the men's lightweight class B, in wheelchair basketball he won Gold in the Men's competition, in table tennis he won a gold medal in the men's doubles Class B and a silver medal in the men's class B, in swimming he won gold in the men's backstroke 50 metres Class C, and silver in the men's 50 metres crawl, class C.

== Recognition ==
- Inducted into Wheelchair Sports WA Hall of Fame.
- Life Membership of Wheelchair Sports WA – 1981
- Western Australian Citizen of the Year for Sport – 1981
- Australian Wheelchair Basketball Hall of Fame – 1995
- Australian Sports Medal – 2000 as a "basketball Paralympian - Captain/Coach since 1957".
- Centenary Medal – 2001 "for service to the community through disabled and wheelchair sports".
