= Alan Yeomans =

Australian jockey, horse racing trainer & swimmer

Personal information
- Born: June 8, 1938 Box Hill, Victoria, Australia
- Died: June 16, 2004 (aged 66) Gold Coast, Queensland, Australia

Sport
- Sport: Swimming
Medal record
Representing Australia
Commonwealth Paraplegic Games
Gold medal – first place	1962 Perth	50m freestyle C
Gold medal – first place	1962 Perth	50m breaststroke C
Silver medal – second place	1962 Perth	50m backstroke C

Alan Yeomans (8 June 1938 – 16 June 2004) was an Australian jockey, horse racing trainer and swimmer. He began working with horses at the age of 17 and rode over 200 winners in his short career as a jockey. Yeomans became a paraplegic at the age of 21 due to a horse racing accident and took up swimming as part of his rehabilitation, winning three medals at the 1962 Commonwealth Paraplegic Games in Perth. In 1967, he became the first licensed paraplegic horse trainer in Australia, and worked in that profession until 1997. He died in 2004 at the age of 66.

== Biography ==
Yeomans was born in the Melbourne suburb of Box Hill on 8 June 1938. His parents were Dorothy and Lennox and he was one of ten children. His mother died suddenly at the age of 39 in 1947. He left school at the age of 15 to become a carpenter. In 1955, a visit to horse trainer Alf Sands' Mordialloc stables led him to become interested in horse racing. At the age of 17, he gave up the carpentry apprenticeship to become a jockey. He had an ideal build for a jockey, weighing 48 kilograms (106 lb) and being 1.57 metres (5 ft 2 in) tall with strong arms, legs and shoulders. He groomed and exercised horses before he was eligible to become an apprentice jockey at the age of 18. His first race ride was in Werribee on 24 August 1956 and he rode his first race winner on 21 November of that year at Kilmore on Dunalister. During his short career, he rode over 200 winners including 74 Melbourne metropolitan winners. Notable wins by Yeomans included the 1957 Australian Cup on Dream Son, the 1958 Caulfield Cup on lightweight Sir Blink, and the 1959 Moonee Valley Cup on Sanyo.

On 27 January 1960, when he was aged 21, his horse Silver Whit was involved in a three-horse fall at Pakenham. He was rushed by ambulance to St Vincent's Hospital by police escort and then transferred to the Austin Hospital. Jockey Ricky Kingston, who was slightly injured in the fall, gave Yeomans oxygen in the ambulance on the way to the hospital as there was no doctor at the racetrack. He sustained ten broken ribs, a broken collarbone, a punctured lung and a broken spine. He lost the use of both legs and was classified as a paraplegic when leaving hospital 9 months after the fall. He was then reliant on a wheelchair or crutches. After leaving hospital, he worked as a clerk.

As part of his rehabilitation, he took up swimming again through the efforts of retired football star Stan Hatwell. He had powerful arms due to his horse riding career and this helped him to swim breaststroke and freestyle efficiently and quickly. He represented Australia at the 1962 Commonwealth Paraplegic Games in Perth. He won two gold medals in the Men's Crawl 50 m Class C and Men's Breaststroke 50 m events and a silver medal in the Backstroke 50 m Class C event. He represented Victoria in archery, basketball and tennis in interstate paraplegic competitions.

In April 1964, he married Mary Cameron, a nurse and they had three children – Lane, Grant and Scott. Lane and Grant became jockeys and all three sons later became horse trainers.

In 1967, aged 28, he became a licensed horse trainer. At the time, he was the only paraplegic horse trainer in Australia. He commenced training at Epsom Racecourse in the Melbourne suburb of Mordialloc. On 19 June 1971 at the Sandown Racecourse, he trained Pagolio to win his first Melbourne metropolitan race. He left Melbourne to train in Townsville and then moved to the Gold Coast in 1972. He trained there until ill health in 1997 forced him to retire from active training. The best horse he trained was Zephr Cross who won the 1986 Ascot Vale Stakes beating Bounding Away, the Golden Slipper winner. He was regarded as the "Douglas Bader" of the horse racing game. He died at the age of 66 on 16 June 2004 on the Gold Coast.
