= Don Watts =

Personal information
- Nationality: Australia
Medal record
Swimming
Paralympic Games
Silver medal – second place	1968 Tel Aviv	Men's 50 m Breaststroke Class 3
Commonwealth Paraplegic Games
Silver medal – second place	1962 Perth	Men's 50 m Breaststroke Class D
Commonwealth Paraplegic Games
Table tennis
Silver medal – second place	1962 Perth	Men's Doubles Class C

Don Watts is an Australian Paralympic swimming silver medalist.

He competed at the 1962 Commonwealth Paraplegic Games in Perth, Western Australia. In swimming, he won a silver medal in the Men's 50 m Breaststroke Class D. In table tennis, he won a silver medal in the Men's Doubles Class C. At the 1968 Tel Aviv Games, he competed in two swimming events and won a silver medal in the Men's 50 m Breaststroke Class 3. He also competed in table tennis.
