= Gary Hooper (Paralympian) =

Australian Paralympic athlete (1939–2025)

Gary Hooper MBE
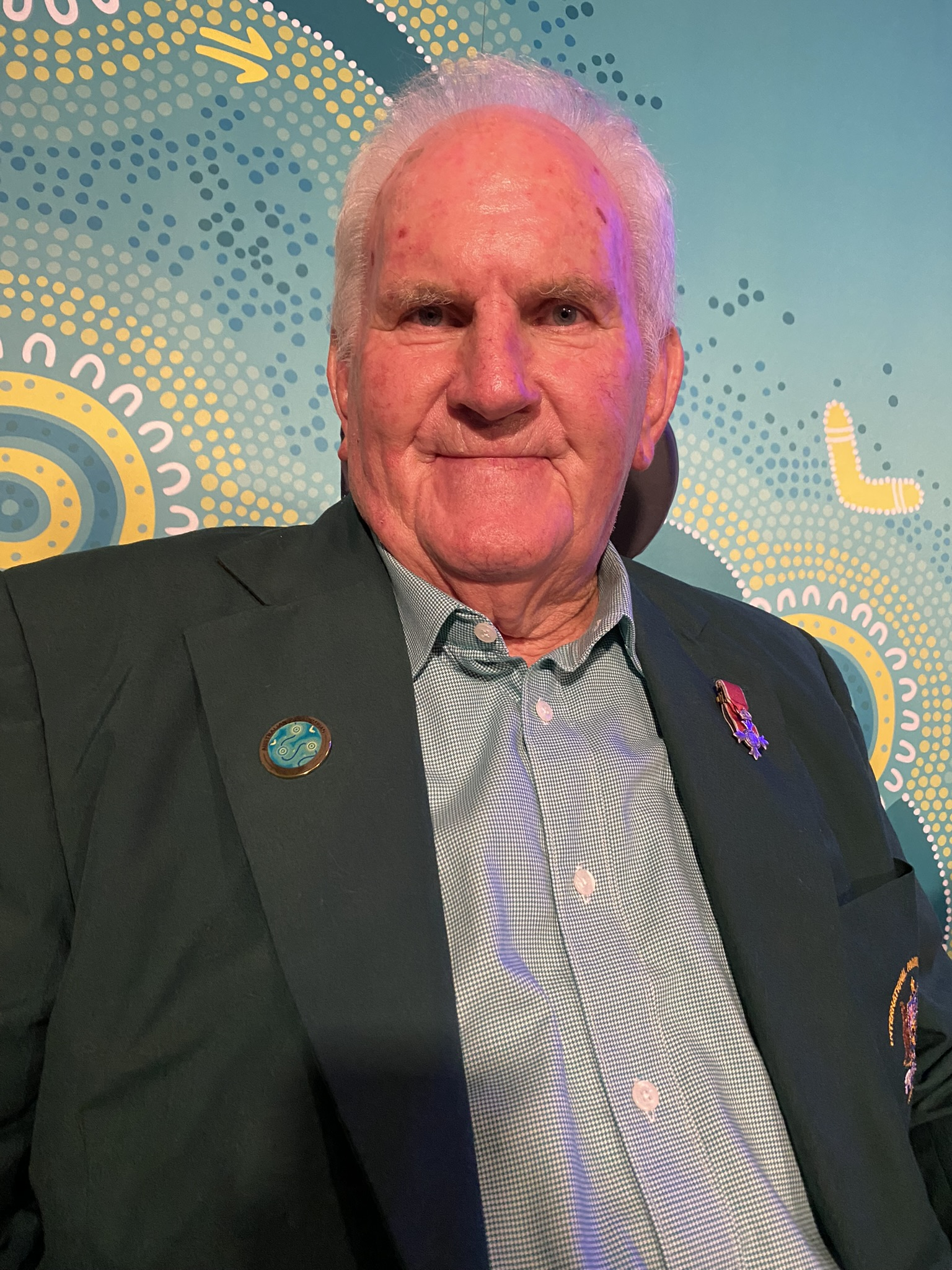
- Hooper in 2022

Personal information
- Full name: Gary Leslie Hooper
- Nationality: Australian
- Born: 11 February 1939 Sydney, New South Wales, Australia
- Died: 13 August 2025 (aged 86) Taree, New South Wales, Australia
Medal record
Athletics
Paralympic Games
Silver medal – second place	1960 Rome	Men's Precision Javelin B
Gold medal – first place	1964 Tokyo	Men's Wheelchair Dash above T10
Silver medal – second place	1964 Tokyo	Men's Wheelchair Relay above T10
Gold medal – first place	1968 Tel Aviv	Men's 100 m Wheelchair A
Silver medal – second place	1968 Tel Aviv	Men's 4x40 m Relay open
Silver medal – second place	1968 Tel Aviv	Men's Shot Put B
Weightlifting
Paralympic Games
Silver medal – second place	1964 Tokyo	Men's Lightweight

Gary Leslie Hooper MBE (11 February 1939 – 13 August 2025) was an Australian Paralympic competitor. He won seven medals at three Paralympics from 1960 to 1968.

== Background ==
Hooper was born on 11 February 1939 in Sydney. He never knew his biological father, and lived with his stepfather. He grew up near Newcastle in Toronto.

He contracted polio at the age of eleven, and lost the use of both his legs. At 16, he attended a live-in rehabilitation centre at the former naval base in Jervis Bay, where he learned a range of trade crafts, including metalwork, woodwork and leatherwork. All students at the centre were encouraged to become as physically fit as possible. After the centre was moved to the Mount Wilga Rehabilitation Hospital in Hornsby, Hooper became involved in wheelchair sport competitions and was successful from the outset.

Hooper trained to become a bookbinder and worked for 25 years at the Newcastle Public Library. He volunteered as the welfare officer for the Foundation for the Disabled in Newcastle. He retired from the Newcastle Public Library in April 1983, 25 years to the day after he commenced, due to ill health following several motor vehicle accidents. Later, he also worked as a public speaker and accessibility consultant.

During Hooper's sporting career, athletes contributed significantly to the cost of attending international sporting events. The contribution was often more than could be afforded by individuals and Hooper was the beneficiary of fundraising efforts by his local community. In 1970, the Hamilton Apex Club launched an appeal which raised $1,490 to send Hooper to the Commonwealth Paraplegic Games in Edinburgh after efforts by the Swansea-Belmont Surf Club and the Toronto Leagues Club fell short of the required amount and Hooper was about to withdraw from the team.

In 1964, he married Janice, who was a librarian at the Newcastle Public Library. They had two sons – Sean and Glen.

Hooper died on 13 August 2025 at Manning Base Hospital, Taree, New South Wales, near his home in Tuncurry, at the age of 86.

== Career ==
Throughout his career, Hooper won titles at all levels and across a range of sports. At the 1966 New South Wales Paraplegic Championships he won 11 titles in events in athletics, fencing and swimming and also competed in table tennis and snooker. At the 1968 Australian Paraplegic Games he won 14 medals, including 10 gold medals, in athletics, fencing, swimming and weightlifting.

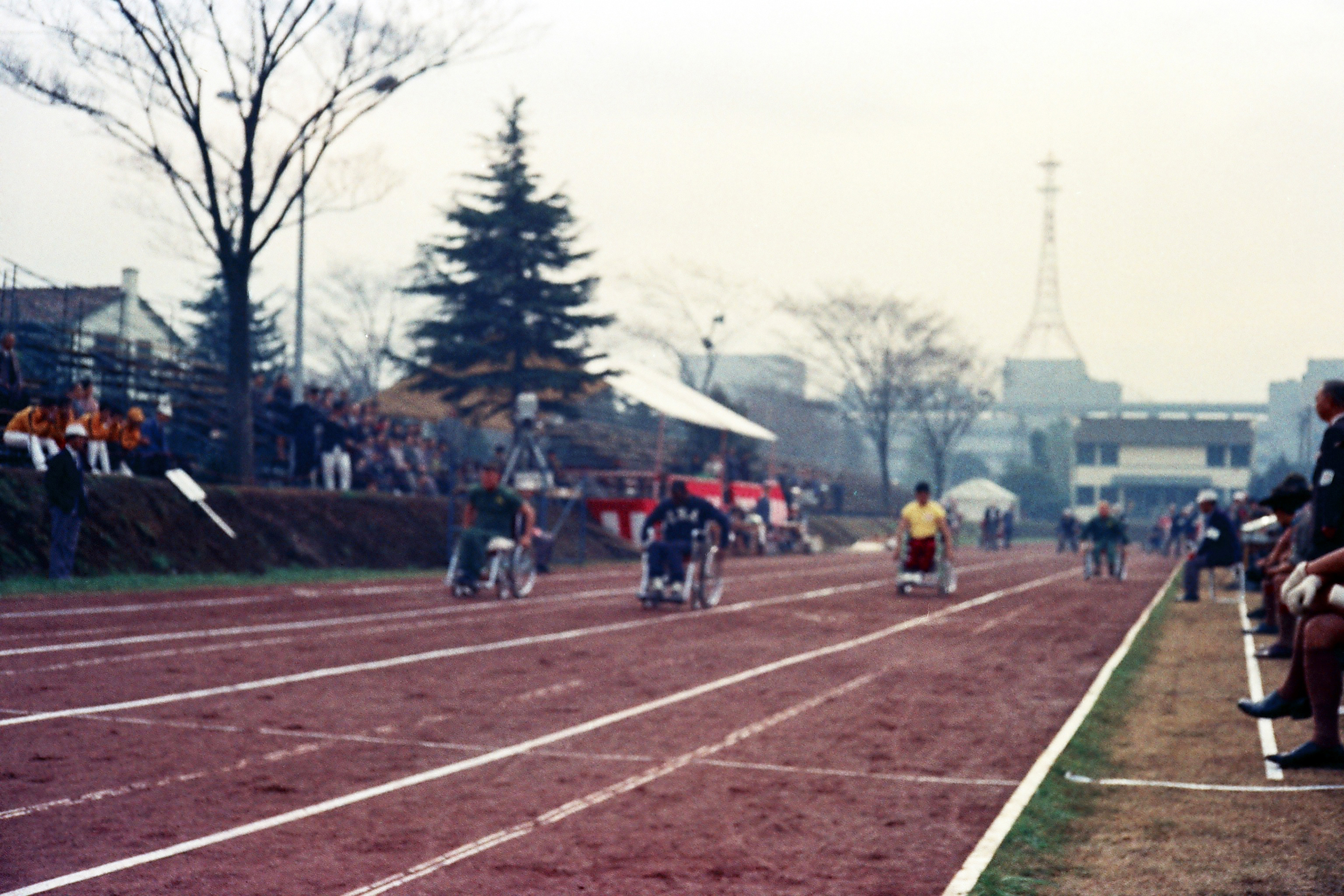
Gary Hooper leads the USA's Don Kennedy to win the sprint at the 1964 Tokyo Paralympic Games

At the 1960 Rome Paralympics, Hooper won a silver medal in the Men's Precision Javelin B event. At the 1964 Tokyo Paralympics, he won a gold medal in the Men's Wheelchair Dash above T10 event and two silver medals in the Men's Wheelchair Relay above T10 and Men's Lightweight weightlifting events; he also competed in swimming and wheelchair fencing at the Games. At the 1968 Tel Aviv Paralympics, he won a gold medal in the Men's 100m Wheelchair A event and two silver medals in the Men's 4x40m Relay open and Men's Shot Put B events; he also competed in swimming, weightlifting, and wheelchair fencing at the Games.

He participated in the 1962, 1966, and 1970 Commonwealth Paraplegic Games in Perth, Jamaica, and Edinburgh, respectively. At the 1962 Commonwealth Paraplegic Games Hooper won 5 gold medals in javelin, precision javelin, club throw shot put and wheelchair basketball, 2 silver medals in breaststroke and weightlifting and 2 bronze medals in the 'Australian crawl' and backstroke swimming events. At the 1966 Commonwealth Paraplegic Games Hooper contested 16 events in total across 5 sports and won 12 medals: gold medals for javelin, club throw, relay, shot put, backstroke; silver in wheelchair sprint, discus sabre teams, basketball and weightlifting; bronze in foils and sabre individual events. At the 1970 Commonwealth Paraplegic Games Hooper won 6 medals in athletics and weightlifting: gold in the precision javelin and 4X100m relay, silver in the 100m, shot put and slalom and bronze in weightlifting.

Hooper retired from competitive sport in 1976 after suffering injuries in a car accident.

He took up lawn bowls in 1988 and aimed for selection as a lawn bowler at the 1992 Barcelona Paralympics. However, after being on the Paralympic program since 1968, lawn bowls was not included in 1992.

Hooper was a judge in fencing at the 2000 Sydney Olympics.

== Recognition ==
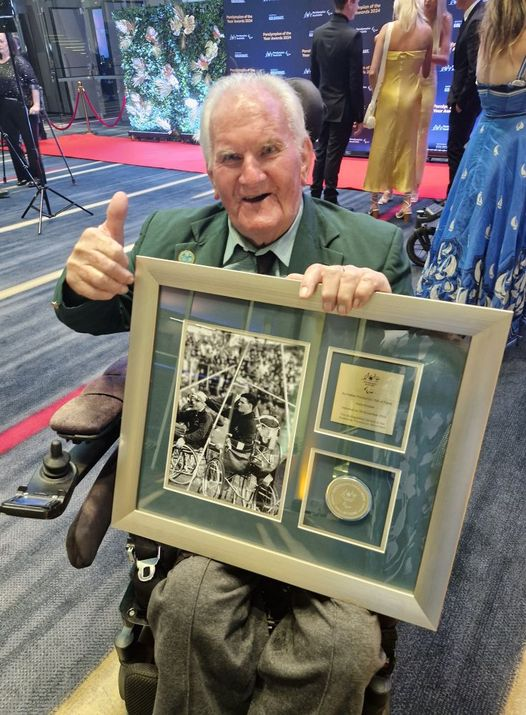
Gary Hooper Australian Paralympic Hall of Fame Presentation 2024

- 1969 – Appointed Member of the Order of the British Empire in the 1969 New Year Honours "for achievements at the Para Olympics and services to disabled persons".
- 2000 – Carried the Olympic and Paralympic Torches during the respective torch relays for the Sydney 2000 Olympic and Paralympic Games.
- 2001 – inducted into the Hunter Region Sporting Hall of Fame.
- 2024 – Inducted into the Australian Paralympic Hall of Fame
