= Bruno Moretti (Paralympian) =

Australian Paralympic athlete (1941–2021)

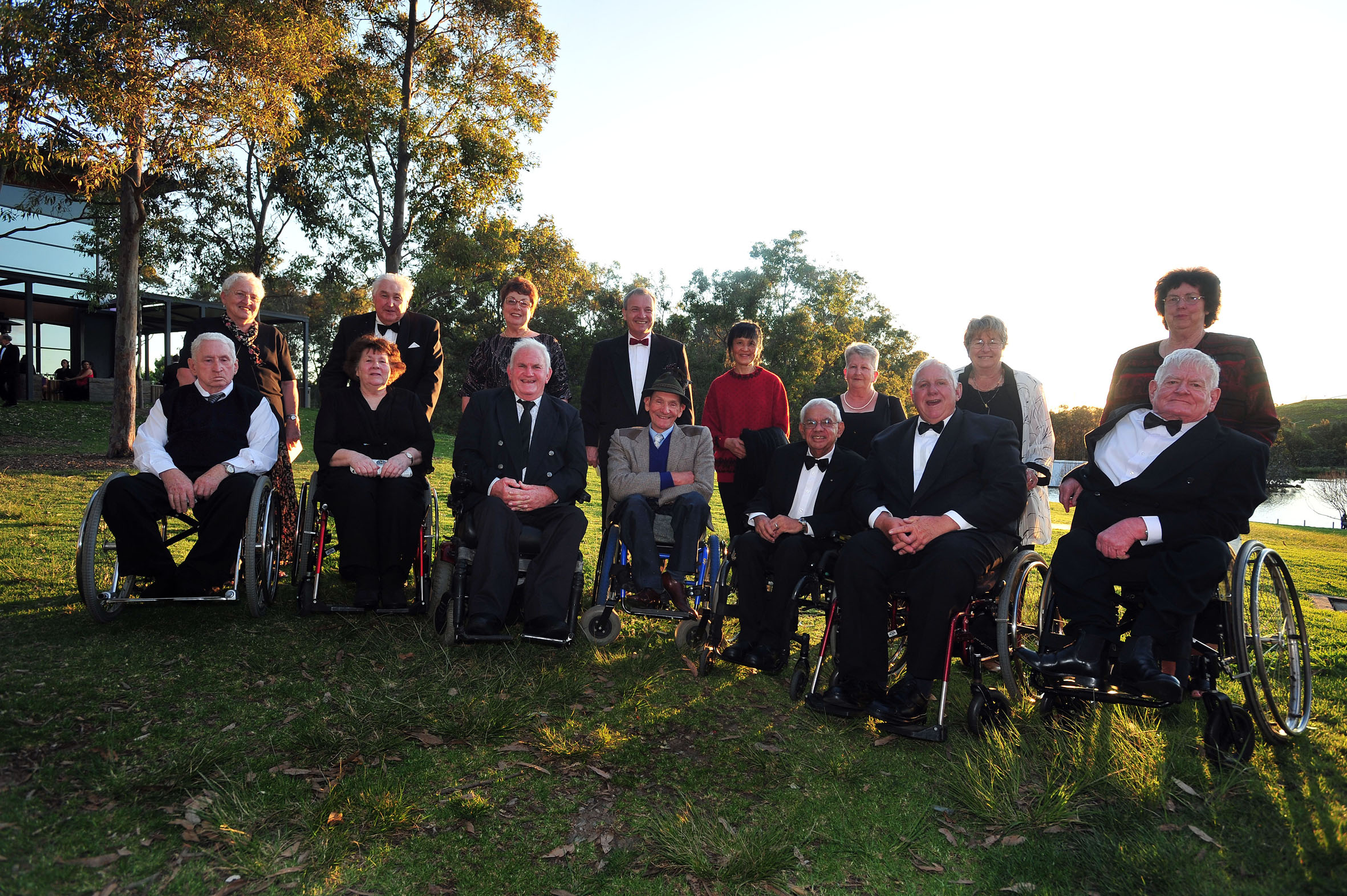
- Moretti (fourth from left) at the 50-year reunion of the 1960 Australian Paralympic Team

Personal information
- Nationality: Australia
- Born: 1941
- Died: 1 November 2021 (aged 80) Melbourne, Australia
Medal record
Table tennis
Paralympic Games
| Silver medal – second place | 1960 Rome | Men's Doubles Class B |
Athletics
Paralympic Games
| Gold medal – first place | 1968 Tel Aviv | Men's Slalom A |
| Silver medal – second place | 1968 Tel Aviv | Men's 100 m Wheelchair A |
| Silver medal – second place | 1968 Tel Aviv | Men's 4x40 mm Relay open |

Bruno Moretti (1941 – 1 November 2021) was an Australian Paralympic competitor.

Moretti was born in Ivanhoe, Victoria in 1940. His spine was dislocated while he was being delivered at birth, four hours after his twin brother.

He won a silver medal in men's class b table tennis at the 1960 Rome Paralympics with Bill Mather-Brown.

At the 1962 Commonwealth Paraplegic Games, Perth, Western Australia, he won four gold medals – basketball, weightlifting and table tennis (two) and three bronze medals in athletics.

At the 1968 Tel Aviv Paralympics, he won a gold medal in the Men's Slalom A event and two silver medals in the Men's 100 m Wheelchair A and Men's 4x40 m Relay open events; he also participated in table tennis events and in the Australia men's national wheelchair basketball team. He coached Australia's wheelchair basketball team at the 1984 New York/Stoke Mandeville Paralympics.

Moretti was a founding member of Disability Sport & Recreation and contributed significantly to the disabled sports movement after his retirement from competition. He was awarded life membership in 1993.

He was married to Scarlette and had one son, Domenico. Moretti died in Melbourne on 1 November 2021, at the age of 80.
