= Ross Sutton =

Australian Paralympic competitor

- Ross Sutton at the 1960 Paralympic Games in Rome

Personal information
- Full name: Ross Edward Sutton
- Nationality: Australia
- Born: 7 January 1938 Guyra, New South Wales
- Died: 22 July 2000 (aged 62)
- Occupations: Watchmaker; Small business owner - Suttle Medals & Militaria, Summer Hill

Sport
- Sport: Archery; Dartchery; Fencing; Table tennis
- Disability: Paraplegia
Medal record
Archery
Paralympic Games
| Gold medal – first place | 1960 Rome | Paraplegics Open |
Commonwealth Paraplegic Games
| Bronze medal – third place | 1962 Perth | Gentleman FITA Round |
| Bronze medal – third place | 1962 Perth | Gentleman Windsor Round |
Dartchery
Commonwealth Paraplegic Games
| Gold medal – first place | 1962 Perth | Dartchery |
Fencing
Commonwealth Paraplegic Games
| Silver medal – second place | 1962 Perth | Men's Team Sabre Fencing |

Ross Edward Sutton (7 January 1938 – 22 July 2000) was the first Australian Paralympic gold medallist. He represented Australia in archery at the 1960 Summer Paralympics in Rome, Italy and dartchery and fencing at the 1962 Commonwealth Paraplegic Games in Perth, Western Australia. Sutton also competed in table tennis at the Second National Paraplegic Games.

== Personal life ==
Sutton was the eldest of five children and his parents were Edward and Ivy. His mother died when he was 12. Sutton helped his father to run their farm in Guyra, New South Wales. At the age of 15, the family moved to Armidale, New South Wales.

On 20 April 1958, 21-year-old Sutton was involved in a Tiger Moth plane crash in Boorolong near Armidale whilst taking a flying lesson. The crash left him paralysed. Peter FitzSimons described the background to the crash. Sutton was in love with a young woman in the region and decided to drop a lover letter to her whilst flying. FitzSimons noted that Sutton had realised after he dropped it "that it was not sufficiently weighted and his love was 'blowin' in the wind', like a mad thing. Ross doubled the Moth back to try to catch it … and crashed." There was some delay in receiving help, eventually he was taken to Armidale and New England Hospital with little chance of surviving. He was later flown to the Royal North Shore Hospital in Sydney where he was treated for chest and facial injuries and a broken spine.

Sutton was submitted to the Mount Wilga Rehabilitation Centre, and during his time there he completed a six-year watchmaking course in two-and-a-half years at Sydney Technical College in Ultimo, New South Wales. Sutton was immobile from the chest down, and as a resident of the rehabilitation facility he was forced to participate in sport for physiotherapy. This is where he began competing in archery, basketball, dartchery, fencing, javelin, shot put and table tennis.

Ross Sutton arrived in Summer Hill, Sydney, in 1968, opening a jewellery and watch repair shop at 50 Lackey Street. He already had an interest in military history when local war veterans asked him to repair or remount their medals as ANZAC Day's approached, his skill was noted and reputation spread. Soon he was inundated with work from across Australia which came at the right time as his jewellery business wasn't doing well and he feared bankruptcy. When the Returned Soldiers League (RSL) made him an official medal mounter and restorer he decided to specialise in militaria, trading as ‘Suttle Medals & Militaria’. A thriving international import and export mail order business developed, he also bought and sold rare coins, books, medals, swords and valuable military artefacts. He spent his idle time reading and researching military history becoming an expert on a variety of subjects, historians at the Australian National War Memorial often seeking his expert advice. His reputation as a military historian was further established with the publication of books, including “Australian Awards Vietnam 1962 to 1991″ and numerous historical studies that were published in peer reviewed journals.

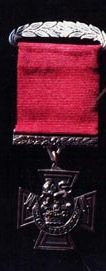
Saved medal of John Paton VC now on display at Stirling Castle in Scotland, home of the regimental museum of the Argyll & Sutherland Highlanders.

Always a much loved figure in Summer Hill he became a local hero in 1982 when he recovered a Victoria Cross which had been stolen only minutes earlier from nearby St Andrews Church, where it had been donated and displayed. Ross Sutton was busy behind the counter when a young man entered his store and asked if he bought medals as well as sold them. Sutton said that he did and the man pulled from his pocket the medal he wished to sell, claiming to have inherited it from his grandfather.

“I knew instantly what it was,” he later recalled, “although dealers in military antiques seldom see one outside a museum or pages of a book. The clasp and ribbon were damaged, looked as if it had been pulled with force off a mounting. Knowing there are few VC’s in private hands in Australia I knew where this one must have come from, it was stolen from a display case at St Andrew’s Church on Henson Street. The lad was breathing heavily, looked as if he had ran all the way from there. I asked how much he wanted for it and he shrugged his shoulders, I offered $250 and his face lit up, I told him I had to get the money from a safe in the back and he happily waited while I went out back and discretely called the police.” Who had already been alerted to the theft by the church, they asked him to detain the thief as long as possible.

Being a wheelchair user, there was no suspicion at the time he was taking, he locked the VC in his safe, knew the medal would vanish forever on the black market if not recovered now and said no matter what happened there was no way he would have given it back to the thief. “The young man turned when a constable placed his hand on his shoulder and I’ll never forget the shocked expression on his face,” Ross later recalled, “he never saw it coming and literally wet his pants. I had to give the police an old towel for him to sit on during the ride to Ashfield Police Station, a detective later dropped by to thank me for my help and said the lad cried his heart out when told the true value of the VC.”

In 1964, Sutton married Josephine Lavender and they adopted three children, Stuart, Yvette and Aletta. Sutton died on 22 July 2000, just months before he was due to carry the Paralympic Torch on the final day of the relay in Sydney for the 2000 Games. His son Stuart ran on his behalf.

== Career ==
=== 1960 Summer Paralympics ===
Sutton attended the first Summer Paralympics in Rome, Italy after undergoing two years of rehabilitation. He won a gold medal in Men's St Nicholas round open archery, the French Challenge Cup and Medal for the best Individual score with 670. This was Australia's first gold medal at the Paralympic Games. Sutton made the following comments regarding his selection "Life is what you make of it I say. Just because you are in a wheelchair, you don’t have to shut yourself away, as some other handicapped people do. I have heard that there are three or four people in wheelchairs in Armidale, and I hope to be able to show them that they can lead useful lives too."

=== 1962 Commonwealth Paraplegic Games ===
At the 1962 Commonwealth Paraplegic Games in Perth, Western Australia, Sutton won a gold medal in doubles dartchery, a silver medal in Men's Team Sabre Fencing and a bronze medal in the Gentleman FITA Round and Gentleman Windsor Round.

=== Australian Paralympic Committee ===
Sutton's family donated his gold medal, with two bows, a box of arrows and various pieces of archery equipment to the Australian Paralympic Committee (APC), in what is arguably the most significant piece of sporting memorabilia in the APC's collection. His medal and equipment have been on display at the National Sports Museum. In 2013, the Chief Executive of the Australian Paralympic Committee at the time, Mr Jason Hellwig, stated that "The achievements of Ross, Daphne and all of our first Paralympians are historically significant to Australia, not only because they won our first Paralympic gold medals but also because their achievements marked a turning point and positive move forward for people with a disability in this country."
