= World Abilitysport Games =

Parasports competition

- Formerly: International Stoke Mandeville Games (1952–1995); World Wheelchair Games (1997–2003); World Wheelchair and Amputee Games (2005–2007); IWAS World Games (2009–2022)
- Sport: Parasports
- Founded: 1948
- Continent: International (IPC)

The World Abilitysport Games (known as the IWAS World Games before 2023) are a parasports multi-sport event for athletes who use wheelchairs or are amputees. Organized by World Abilitysport (formerly IWAS), the Games are a successor to the original Stoke Mandeville Games founded in 1948 by Ludwig Guttmann, and specifically the International Stoke Mandeville Games—the first international sporting competition for athletes with disabilities which was held in 1952, itself an Olympic year, between British and Dutch athletes and which ultimately was the forerunner to the modern Paralympic Games.

The 1960, 1964, 1968, and 1972 editions of the International Stoke Mandeville Games were held in the same host country as the Summer Olympics; they were retroactively recognized by the International Olympic Committee as the first four Summer Paralympic Games. The event continued to be held annually, as simply the International Stoke Mandeville Games, in between Paralympic years. After the Paralympics expanded to include events for disability classifications other than wheelchairs, the ISMG for wheelchair athletes continued to be hosted annually in Stoke Mandeville, and later other countries, in all non-Paralympic years.

In 2024, the previous IWAS merged with the Cerebral Palsy International Sports and Recreation Association (CPISRA) to form World Abilitysport and the IWAS World Games were once more renamed World Abilitysport Games accordingly.

== History ==
The event was first established in 1948 as the Stoke Mandeville Games by neurologist Ludwig Guttmann, who organized a sporting competition involving World War II veterans with spinal cord injuries at the Stoke Mandeville Hospital rehabilitation facility in Aylesbury, England, taking place concurrently with the first post-war Olympic Games in London. In 1952, the Netherlands joined in the event, creating the first international sports competition for athletes with a disability, after which it was renamed the International Stoke Mandeville Games.

In 1960 and subsequent Olympic years, the ISMG began to increasingly be hosted in the same country (if not the same host city) as their respective Olympics, with all other editions remaining in Stoke Mandeville. The Games were also increasingly referred to as "Paralympics", originally in reference to paraplegia, but later officially referring to an event operating in parallel with the Olympic movement. While the Paralympic Games expanded to include athletes from all disability groups beginning in 1976, the Stoke Mandeville Games continued to be organized as a multi-sport event for wheelchair athletes in non-Paralympic years. Games were held annually in Aylesbury under the direction of the International Stoke Mandeville Games Federation (ISMGF), which later became the International Stoke Mandeville Wheelchair Sports Federation (ISMWSF).

In 2003, the Games were combined with a competition for amputee athletes organized by the International Sports Organization for the Disabled (ISOD). In 2004, ISMWSF and ISOD merged to create the International Wheelchair and Amputee Sports Federation (IWAS). The Games were subsequently renamed the "World Wheelchair and Amputee Games" in 2005, and later renamed to simply the "IWAS World Games".

In 2024, IWAS merged with the Cerebral Palsy International Sports and Recreation Association (CPISRA) to form World Abilitysport.

== Games by year ==
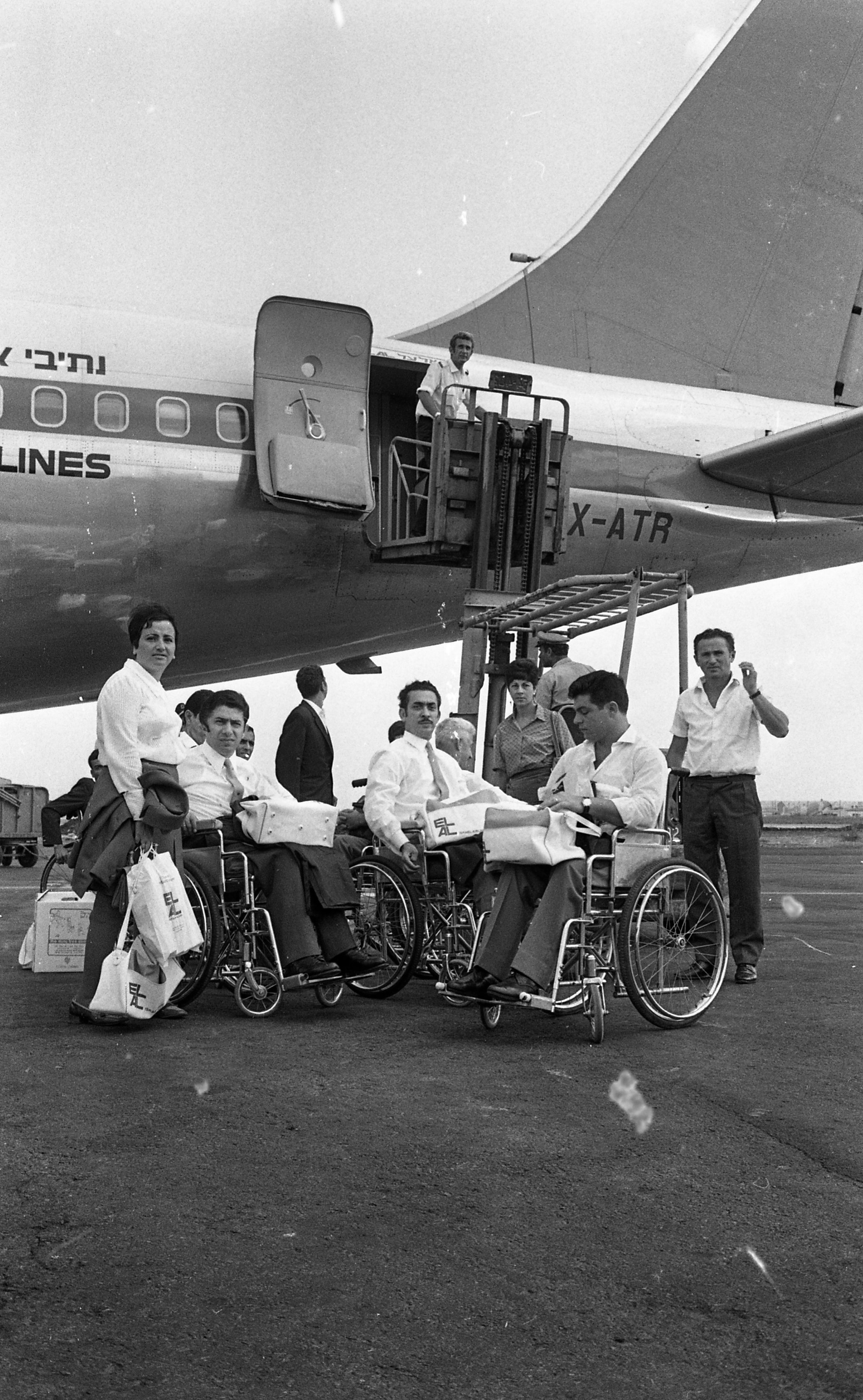
Israeli delegation to the games, 1969

The inaugural competition, initially named "Stoke Mandeville Games for the Paralyzed" in 1948, was just named "Stoke Mandeville Games" the next year, before becoming the "International Stoke Mandeville Games" (ISMG) in 1952.

Beginning in 1960 during Summer Olympic years, the ISMG were held in the same host city as the Summer Olympics. These particular editions of the Games were retroactively recognised as being the first four Paralympic Games. The Games were otherwise hosted in Stoke Mandeville in all other years. Beginning in 1976, the Paralympic Games began hosting events for amputees and the visually impaired; at this point, the Paralympics were no longer credited as being editions of the ISMG, but the ISMG went on hiatus during Paralympic years.

Year	Name of the event	Host	Annotation
Stoke Mandeville Games
1948	Stoke Mandeville Games for the Paralyzed	Stoke Mandeville, United Kingdom	July 28, 1948, archery competition, 16 competitors (14 men, 2 women)
1949	Stoke Mandeville Games	Stoke Mandeville, United Kingdom	Six teams competed.'wheelchair netball' (later wheelchair basketball) was introduced.
1950	Stoke Mandeville Games	Stoke Mandeville, United Kingdom	
1951	Stoke Mandeville Games	Stoke Mandeville, United Kingdom	
International Stoke Mandeville Games
1952	1st International Stoke Mandeville Games	Stoke Mandeville, United Kingdom	A Dutch team participated, making it an international event for the first time.
1953	2nd International Stoke Mandeville Games	Stoke Mandeville, United Kingdom	
1954	3rd International Stoke Mandeville Games	Stoke Mandeville, United Kingdom	
1955	4th International Stoke Mandeville Games	Stoke Mandeville, United Kingdom	
1956	5th International Stoke Mandeville Games	Stoke Mandeville, United Kingdom	
1957	6th International Stoke Mandeville Games	Stoke Mandeville, United Kingdom	
1958	7th International Stoke Mandeville Games	Stoke Mandeville, United Kingdom	
1959	8th International Stoke Mandeville Games	Stoke Mandeville, United Kingdom	
Combined International Stoke Mandeville Games and Paralympic Games era
1960	9th International Stoke Mandeville Games and 1960 Summer Paralympics	Rome, Italy	400 competitors from 23 countries (10 with medalists) in 8 sports. First edition occurring outside UK, in the same host city as the Summer Olympic Games. Held in Rome in the hope of becoming better internationally recognized and integrated with other national and international sports federations to organize what will become recognised as the Paralympic Games.
1961	10th International Stoke Mandeville Games	Stoke Mandeville, United Kingdom	
1962	11th International Stoke Mandeville Games	Stoke Mandeville, United Kingdom	
1963	12th International Stoke Mandeville Games	Stoke Mandeville, United Kingdom	
1964	13th International Stoke Mandeville Games and 1964 Summer Paralympics	Tokyo, Japan	Second Paralympic Games retrospectively
1965	14th International Stoke Mandeville Games	Stoke Mandeville, United Kingdom	
1966	15th International Stoke Mandeville Games	Stoke Mandeville, United Kingdom	
1967	16th International Stoke Mandeville Games	Stoke Mandeville, United Kingdom	
1968	17th International Stoke Mandeville Games and 1968 Summer Paralympics	Tel Aviv, Israel	Third Paralympic Games retrospectively. First edition held outside the Olympic host city.
1969	18th International Stoke Mandeville Games	Stoke Mandeville, United Kingdom	
1970	19th International Stoke Mandeville Games	Stoke Mandeville, United Kingdom	
1971	20th International Stoke Mandeville Games	Stoke Mandeville, United Kingdom	
1972	1972 Summer Paralympics and 21st International Stoke Mandeville Games	Heidelberg, West Germany	Fourth Paralympic Games retrospectively, First edition where 'Paralympic Games' title took primacy. Final edition which served as both International Stoke Mandeville Games and Paralympic Games. Held in Olympic host country for first time since 1964.
1973	22nd International Stoke Mandeville Games	Stoke Mandeville, United Kingdom	
1974	23rd International Stoke Mandeville Games	Stoke Mandeville, United Kingdom	
1975	24th International Stoke Mandeville Games	Stoke Mandeville, United Kingdom	
Paralympic Games and International Stoke Mandeville Games diverge.
1977	25th International Stoke Mandeville Games	Stoke Mandeville, United Kingdom	
1978	26th International Stoke Mandeville Games	Stoke Mandeville, United Kingdom	
1979	27th International Stoke Mandeville Games	Stoke Mandeville, United Kingdom	
1981	28th International Stoke Mandeville Games	Stoke Mandeville, United Kingdom	
1982	29th International Stoke Mandeville Games	Stoke Mandeville, United Kingdom	
1983	30th International Stoke Mandeville Games	Stoke Mandeville, United Kingdom	
1985	31st International Stoke Mandeville Games	Stoke Mandeville, United Kingdom	
1986	32nd International Stoke Mandeville Games	Stoke Mandeville, United Kingdom	
1987	33rd International Stoke Mandeville Games	Stoke Mandeville, United Kingdom	
1989	34th International Stoke Mandeville Games	Stoke Mandeville, United Kingdom	
1990	35th International Stoke Mandeville Games	Stoke Mandeville, United Kingdom	
1991	36th International Stoke Mandeville Games	Stoke Mandeville, United Kingdom	
1993	37th International Stoke Mandeville Games	Stoke Mandeville, United Kingdom	
1994	38th International Stoke Mandeville Games	Stoke Mandeville, United Kingdom	
1995	39th International Stoke Mandeville Games	Stoke Mandeville, United Kingdom	
World Wheelchair Games
1997	World Wheelchair Games		From 1997, the International Stoke Mandeville Games became the "World Wheelchair Games"
1998	World Wheelchair Games		
1999	World Wheelchair Games	Christchurch, New Zealand	
2001	World Wheelchair Games		
2002	World Wheelchair Games		
2003	World Wheelchair Games	Christchurch, New Zealand	
World Wheelchair and Amputee Games
2005	World Wheelchair and Amputee Games	Rio de Janeiro, Brazil	Renamed "World Wheelchair and Amputee Games" Over 700 athletes from 44 nations. Five events: track and field, table tennis, archery, shooting, and billiards.
2007	World Wheelchair and Amputee Games	Taipei, Taiwan	
IWAS World Games
2009	IWAS World Games	Bangalore, Karnataka, India	Renamed the IWAS World Games. IWAS World Games move to a biennial cycle from 2010.
2011	IWAS World Games	Sharjah, United Arab Emirates	December 1–10, 2011
2013	IWAS World Games	Stadskanaal, Netherlands	
2015	IWAS World Games	Sochi, Russia	
2017	IWAS World Games	Vila Real de Santo António, Portugal	
2019	IWAS World Games	Sharjah, United Arab Emirates	IWAS World Games returned to annual cycle
~~2020~~	~~IWAS World Games~~	~~Nakhon Ratchasima, Thailand~~	Cancelled due to the COVID-19 pandemic.
~~2021~~	~~IWAS World Games~~	~~Vila Real de Santo António, Portugal~~	Cancelled due to the COVID-19 pandemic.
2022	IWAS World Games	Vila Real de Santo António, Portugal	Originally scheduled to be hosted by Sochi, IWAS stripped Sochi of its hosting rights in March 2022 in response to the Russian invasion of Ukraine, and banned Russian and Belarusian athletes and officials from participating. The Games were relocated to Vila Real de Santo António, Portugal, which was originally scheduled to host the Games in 2021.
World Abilitysport Games
2023	World Abilitysport Games	Nakhon Ratchasima, Thailand	Renamed "World Abilitysport Games" after the merger of IWAS and Cerebral Palsy International Sports and Recreation Association (CPISRA). The separate CPISRA Games are not considered part of the history of the WASG.
2025	World Abilitysport Games	Nakhon Ratchasima, Thailand	

== IWAS Under 23 World Games (IWAS Junior World Games) ==
For some years now, the IWAS Federation has hosted junior competitions, which were named IWAS World Junior Games by 2015. Since 2016 they are called IWAS Under 23 World Games and will only be played in years with even numbers.

No.	Year	Dates	Host City	Venue	Events	Results List
1	2005	6–7 July	Stoke Mandeville, United Kingdom			Result list
2	2006	14–16 July	(Republic of Ireland) Dublin, Ireland			Result list
3	2007	4–6 April	Ekurhuleni, South Africa	Germiston Sports Precinct		Result list
4	2008	18–27 July	Piscataway, New Jersey, United States			Results
5	2009	16–19 July	Nottwil, Switzerland	SPZ Nottwil		Result list
6	2010	19–26 August	Olomouc, Czech Republic			Results
7	2011	14–21 April	Dubai, United Arab Emirates			Result List
8	2012	19–21 July	Olomouc, Czech Republic			Results
9	2013	14–21 August	Mayaguez, Puerto Rico	Central American Stadium		Ergebnisliste
10	2014	3–7 August	Stoke Mandeville, United Kingdom			Results
11	2015	2–8 July	Stadskanaal, Netherlands	Sportpark Stadskanaal		Ergebnisliste
12	2016	29 June–3 July	Prague, Czech Republic			Results

- http://www.iwasf.com/iwasf/index.cfm/games/iwas-world-junior-games1111/past-games111/

== World Abilitysport Guttmann Games ==
In 2024, World Abilitysport announced its inaugural World Abilitysport Guttmann Games. Named after the founder of the Stoke Mandeville Games, the event will take place in Stoke Mandeville in July 2024, and feature competition in sports not on the Paralympic programme. It is scheduled to feature para dance sport and power hockey competitions, as well as wheelchair cricket as a demonstration sport. The event will be broadly analogous to the World Games, a similar multi-sport event for non-Olympic sports and disciplines.

== See also ==
- International Wheelchair and Amputee Sports Federation
