= Australia at the 1964 Summer Paralympics =

- IPC code: AUS
- NPC: Australian Paralympic Committee
- Website: www.paralympic.org.au

in Tokyo
- Medals Ranked 4th: Gold 12 Silver 11 Bronze 7 Total 30

Summer Paralympics appearances (overview)
- 1960; 1964; 1968; 1972; 1976; 1980; 1984; 1988; 1992; 1996; 2000; 2004; 2008; 2012; 2016; 2020; 2024

Also known as the 13th Stoke Mandeville Games, the 1964 Summer Paralympics was the 2nd Paralympic Games. Hosted in Tokyo, the games ran from 8 to 12 November. Australia won a total of 30 medals (12 gold, 11 silver, and 7 bronze) and finished fourth on the medal tally behind Italy (3rd), Great Britain (2nd) and the United States (1st). Australia competed in 6 of the 9 sports at the Games, winning medals in each of those sports, but was most successful in the pool, winning a majority of their medals in swimming events.

== Background ==
Prior to the 1964 Paralympic Games, some of the athletes competed in the 1962 Commonwealth Paraplegic Games in Perth whilst others competed in the Third 'National Paraplegic Games' in Adelaide in order to qualify for the Paralympic Games.

There was no selection process for the venue of the 1964 Paralympic Games, it simply went to the city that had hosted the Olympics as it had 4 years ago in Rome (1960). Also there is no record of a Paralympic flame or mascot at these games.

The Australian team left Sydney for Tokyo on 5 November 1964, comprising 25 athletes, staff and others, having conducted final preparations and briefing at Prince Henry's Hospital. On 7 November, the team attended a reception hosted by the Governor of Tokyo Dr Royotaro Ayuimo. The opening ceremony was held the following day, involving 375 competitors and 144 medal events in 9 sports.

Australians encountered two issues at the games, the first being the weather and the second was the timing of the games. On the first day athletes faced bitterly cold headwinds which effected the discus, shot put and javelin events causing the events to be restarted. Timing was also tight, as the games only lasted a total of four and a half days. This made for a very busy schedule for athletes competing in multiple events. However, despite these issues the games were given a glowing review by members of the Australian Paralympic team. The events were well organised and the athletes were treated with a sense of legitimacy and professionalism that had so far been absent from disability sport. One Australian athlete recalls, "At the village we [were] halted by a magnificent entrance welcoming us with flags, banners and posters for the Paralympics. It was clear that Japan had decided to show their visitors the hospitality and efficiency that she had shown the Olympic Visitors".

== Team ==
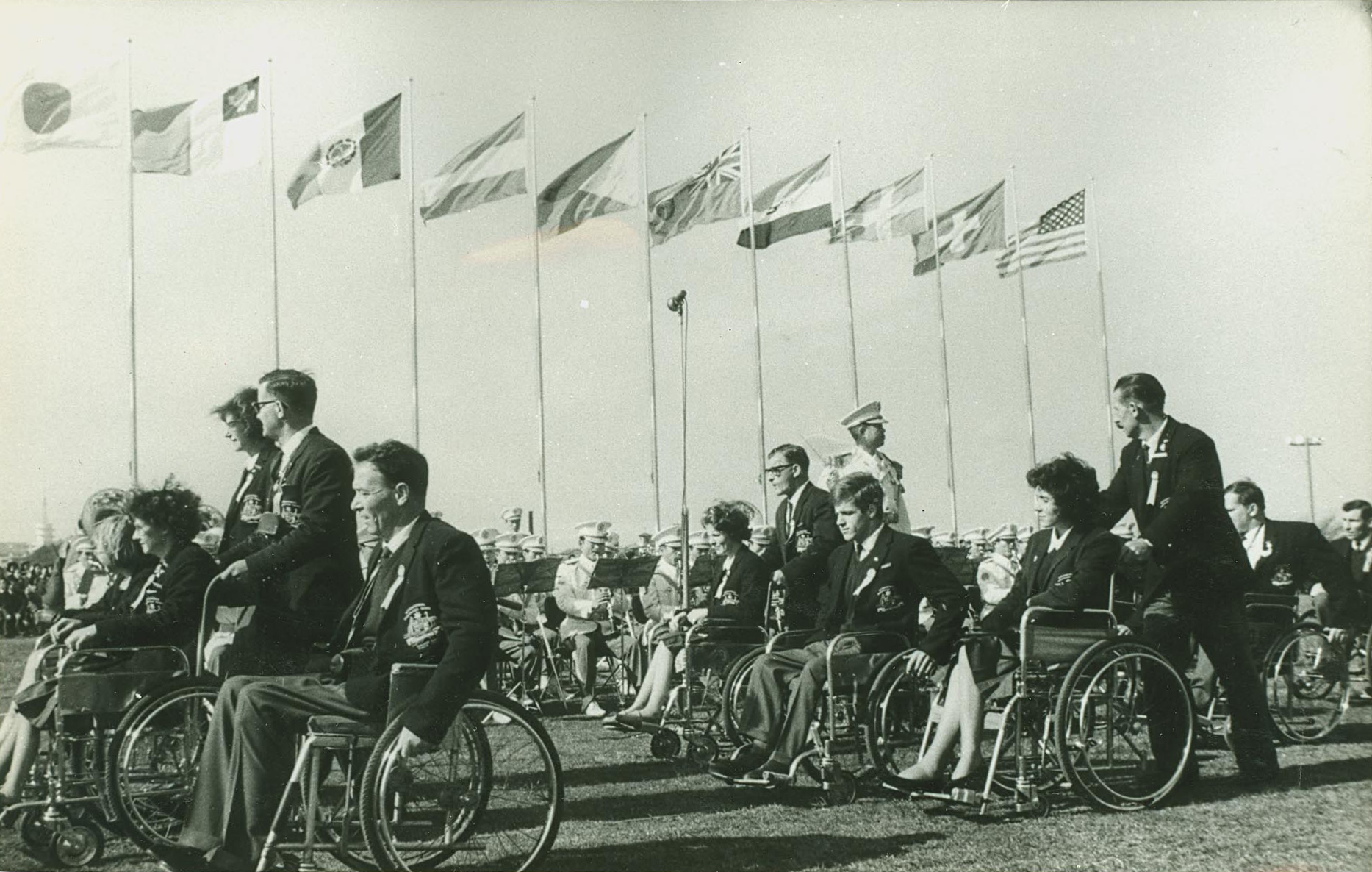
Members of the Australian team at the opening ceremony of the Tokyo Games, 3 November 1964

Australia sent 15 athletes to the 1964 Summer Paralympics.

The team members were:

Athlete	Location
Bruce Thwaite (Team Captain)	New South Wales
Daphne Ceeney	New South Wales
Alan McLucas	New South Wales
Trevor French	New South Wales
John Martin	New South Wales
Gary Hooper	New South Wales
Elaine Schreiber	Victoria
Michael Dow	Victoria
Vic Renalson	Queensland
Roy Fowler	Queensland
Marion O'Brien	Western Australia
Frank Ponta	Western Australia
Bill Mather-Brown	Western Australia
Lionel Cousens	Western Australia
Elizabeth Edmondson	Western Australia

Reserves	Location
Miko Taminin	Queensland
J.Gidney	New South Wales

Accompanying the team were 8 escorts, all with specific roles to play within the team:
– Dr George Bedbrook (Team Leader & Medical Officer)
– Johnno Johnston (Manager & Remedial Gymnast)
– Margaret Buzacott (Nurse)
– Kevin Betts (Attendant)
– Bill Gibbs (Attendant)
– K. Pinschers (Coach)
– Tim Timmermans (Coach)
– Cyril Thomas (Baggage Master)

== Medalists ==
Medal	Name	Sport	Event
Gold	Gary Hooper	Athletics	Men's Wheelchair dash above T10
Gold	Elaine Schreiber	Athletics	Women's Club throw A
Gold	Roy Fowler	Swimming	Men's 25 m Freestyle Prone Complete class 1
Gold	Roy Fowler	Swimming	Men's 25 m Freestyle Supine Complete class 1
Gold	Roy Fowler	Swimming	Men's 25 m Breaststroke Complete class 1
Gold	Michael Dow	Swimming	Men's 50 m Freestyle Supine Incomplete class 3
Gold	Michael Dow	Swimming	Men's 50 m Breaststroke Incomplete Class 3
Gold	Elizabeth Edmondson	Swimming	Women's 50 m Freestyle Prone Complete class 5
Gold	Elizabeth Edmondson	Swimming	Women's 50 m Freestyle Supine Cauda Equina
Gold	Elizabeth Edmondson	Swimming	Women's 50 m Breaststroke Cauda Equina
Gold	Frank Ponta	Swimming	Men's 25 m Freestyle Supine Complete class 2
Gold	Daphne Ceeney Marion O'Brien	Table Tennis	Women's Doubles C
Silver	Roy Fowler	Archery	Men's St. Nicholas Round open
Silver	Lionel Cousens, Roy Fowler, John Martin	Archery	Men's St. Nicholas Round Team
Silver	Australian team	Athletics	Men's Wheelchair Relay above T10
Silver	Elaine Schreiber	Athletics	Women's Javelin Throw A
Silver	Marion O'Brien	Athletics	Women's Javelin Throw C
Silver	Daphne Ceeney	Swimming	Women's 50 m Freestyle Prone Complete class 5
Silver	Trevor French	Swimming	Men's 25 m Freestyle Supine Complete Class 2
Silver	Michael Dow	Weightlifting	Men's Featherweight
Silver	Gary Hooper	Weightlifting	Men's Lightweight
Silver	Vic Renalson	Weightlifting	Men's Heavyweight
Silver	Frank Ponta	Wheelchair fencing	Men's Foil Novice Individual
Bronze	Daphne Ceeney	Archery	Women's Albion Round Open
Bronze	Michael Dow	Swimming	Men's 50 m Freestyle Prone Incomplete lass 3
Bronze	Daphne Ceeney	Swimming	Women's 50 m freestyle Supine Cauda Equina
Bronze	Allan McLucas	Table Tennis	Men's Singles A2
Bronze	Elaine Schreiber	Table Tennis	Women's Singles B
Bronze	Marion O'Brien	Table Tennis	Women's Singles C
Bronze	Daphne Ceeney	Wheelchair fencing	Women's Foil Individual

Medals by discipline
Discipline	Gold medal	Silver medal	Bronze medal	Total
Archery	0	2	1	3
Athletics	2	3	0	5
Wheelchair fencing	0	1	1	2
Swimming	9	2	2	13
Table tennis	1	0	3	4
Weightlifting	0	3	0	3
Total	12	11	7	30

== Events ==
=== Archery ===
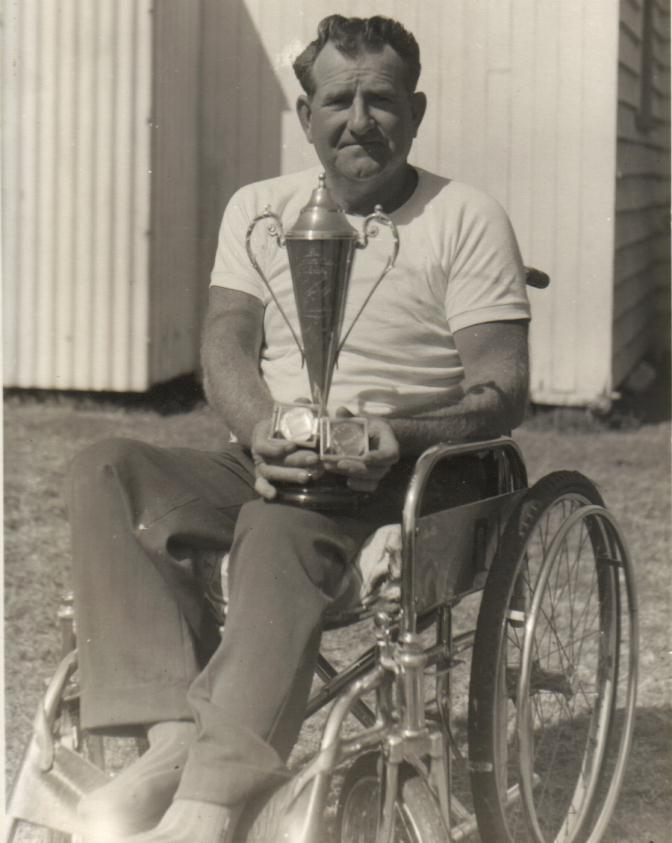
Roy Fowler holding a trophy and two medals that he won over his sporting career

Gender	Australia Represented By
Men	Lionel Cousens, Roy Fowler, John Martin, Alan McLucas, Trevor French
Women	Daphne Ceeney

Daphne Ceeney won bronze in the Women's Albion Round open with a score of 538.
Roy Fowler won silver in the Men's St. Nicholas Round open with a score of 700.
Lionel Cousens, Roy Fowler and John Martin won silver in the Men's St. Nicholas Round Team open with a score of 1995.

=== Athletics ===
Gender	Australia Represented By
Men	Michael Dow, Gary Hooper, John Martin, Bill Mather-Brown, Frank Ponta, Vic Renalson
Women	Daphne Ceeney, Marion O'Brien, Elaine Schreiber

Bill (William) Mather-Brown (60m, Club Throw, Discus Throw, Precision Javelin, Javelin Throw, Shot Put, Slalom), 4x40m Relay? Frank Ponta (Club Throw, Discus Throw, Precision Javelin, Javelin Throw, Shot Put) 4x40m? Mike Dow (60m, Club Throw, Discus Throw, Javelin Throw, Shot Put, Slalom), 4x40m? John Martin (Club Throw, Shot Put) Vic Renalson (Discus Throw)

Marion O'Brien won a silver medal in the Women's Javelin C with a throw of 10.27 metres.

Elaine Schreiber won a gold medal in the Women's Club Throw A with a throw of 17.31 metres and won a silver medal in the Women's Javelin A with a throw of 9.26 metres.

Gary Hooper won a gold medal in the Men's Wheelchair Dash above T10.

Australia won a silver medal in the Men's Wheelchair Relay above T10.

=== Dartchery ===
Australia was represented by Roy Farmer and his partner with Lionel Cousens and Trevor French and his partner with John Martin.

=== Snooker ===
Australia did not compete in Snooker at the 1964 Summer Paralympics.

=== Swimming ===
Swimming allowed me to move through the water with a certain amount of grace and my disability seemed to disappear in the dimensions of the pool. It got me physically fit, which was a big plus. I enjoyed the competition, the travel and most of all people I met became firm friends. Sport has meant a great deal to me.

— Elizabeth Edmondson

Gender	Australia Represented By
Men	Michael Dow, Trevor French, Roy Fowler, Gary Hooper, Alan McLucas, John Martin, Frank Ponta, Bruce Thwaite
Women	Daphne Ceeney, Elizabeth Edmondson

Coach	Tim Timmerman

Trevor French won a silver medal in the Men's 25 m Freestyle Supine complete class 2 with a time of 31.6 seconds.

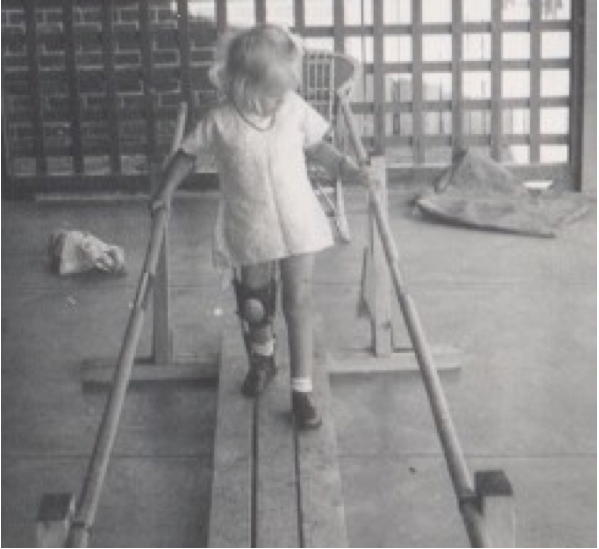
A young Elizabeth Edmondson recovering from polio (1953)

Daphne Ceeney won a silver medal in the Women's 50 m Freestyle Prone complete class 5 with a time of 40.1 seconds and she won a bronze medal in the Women's 50 m Freestyle Supine cauda equina with a time of 56.4 seconds.

Michael Dow won a gold medal in the Men's 50 m Freestyle Supine incomplete class 3 with a time of 49.7 seconds. He won another gold medal in the Men's 50 m Breaststroke incomplete class 3 with a time of 59.6 seconds. He also won a bronze medal in the Men's 50 m Freestyle Prone incomplete class 3 with a time of 50.9 seconds.

Frank Ponta won a gold medal in the Men's 25 m Freestyle Supine complete class 2 with a time of 30.0 seconds.

Elizabeth Edmondson was the youngest competitor at the games at the age of just 14 years old. Edmondson won a gold medal in the Women's 50 m Breaststroke cauda equina with a time of 1:04.6, a world record. She won a second gold medal in the Women's 50 m Freestyle Prone complete class 5 with a time of 39.7 seconds, a world record. And she won a third gold medal in the Women's 50 m Freestyle Supine cauda equina with a time of 50.8 seconds, another world record. At the conclusion of the 1964 Games, Edmondson's parents acknowledged that swimming had greatly helped their daughter, but felt that she needed to quit the sport and concentrate on her education because swimming would not provide her with standing in life. After the 1964 games, Edmondson returned home and prepared for school exams.

Roy Fowler won a gold medal in the Men's 25 m Breaststroke complete class 1 with a time of 45.6 seconds. He won a second gold medal in the Men's 25 m Freestyle Prone complete class 1 with a time of 38.3 seconds. He won a third gold medal in the Men's 25 m Freestyle Supine complete class 1 with a time of 41.0 seconds.

=== Table Tennis ===
Gender	Australia Represented By
Men	Alan McLucas
Women	Daphne Ceeney, Marion O'Brien, Elaine Schreiber

Allan McLucas won a bronze medal in the Men's Singles A2.

Elaine Schreiber won a bronze medal in the Women's Singles B.

Marion O'Brien won a bronze medal in the Women's Singles C.

Daphne Ceeney and Marion O'Brien won a gold medal in the Women's Doubles C.

=== Weightlifting ===
Gender	Australia Represented By
Men	Michael Dow, Gary Hooper, Bill Mather-Brown, Vic Renalson, Bruce Thwaite

- Weightlifting was the only completely new sport added to the Paralympics this year. Michael Dow won a silver medal in the Men's Featherweight with a lift of 95 kg.

Gary Hooper won a silver medal in the Men's Lightweight.

Vic Renalson won a silver medal in the Men's Heavyweight with a lift of 155 kg. Vic went on to compete in weightlifting and medal in 1968, 1972 and 1976 representing Australia in 4 consecutive Paralympic games.

=== Wheelchair basketball ===
Australia did not field a wheelchair basketball team at the 1964 Summer Paralympics.

=== Wheelchair fencing ===
Gender	Australia Represented By
Men	Gary Hooper, Bill Mather-Brown, Frank Ponta
Women	Daphne Ceeney

Coach	Mr K. Pinches.

Daphne Ceeney won a bronze medal in the Women's Foil Individual.

Frank Ponta won a silver medal in the Men's Foil Novice Individual.

== Competition venues ==
Although the games used the same village from the Olympic Games, most of the sporting facilities differed from those used in the Olympic Games. The National gymnasium and the National Gymnasium Annexe were the only venues used for both games. Overall, the sports were spread across seven venues. These included:

1. Oda Field: (Athletics and the opening ceremony)
2. National Gymnasium: (Snooker, Table Tennis and Weightlifting)
3. National Gymnasium Annexe: (Indoor Basketball venue and closing ceremony)
4. Basketball Venue (outdoor)
5. Archery and Dartchery venue
6. Tokyo Metropolitan Indoor Swimming Pool
7. Fencing venue

== Opening ceremony ==
The opening ceremony was held on Sunday 8 November at 10.00 am on the 'Oda' Track and Field stadium. Emperor Akihito (who was the Japanese Crown Prince in 1964) and his wife Empress Michiko (who was the Japanese Crown Princess) attended the opening ceremony and officially opened the Games. The ceremony began with a colourful, flag-waving procession of 375 athletes across the represented 21 countries. This procession was led by a marching band of young Japanese girls. Speeches from the Crown Prince and other representatives transpired before Japanese swimmer Shigeo Aono took the athlete's oath. What followed was the release of hundreds of pigeons into the air. To conclude the opening ceremony, a demonstration of traditional Japanese fencing was undertaken by members of the Defence Force.

== Closing ceremony ==
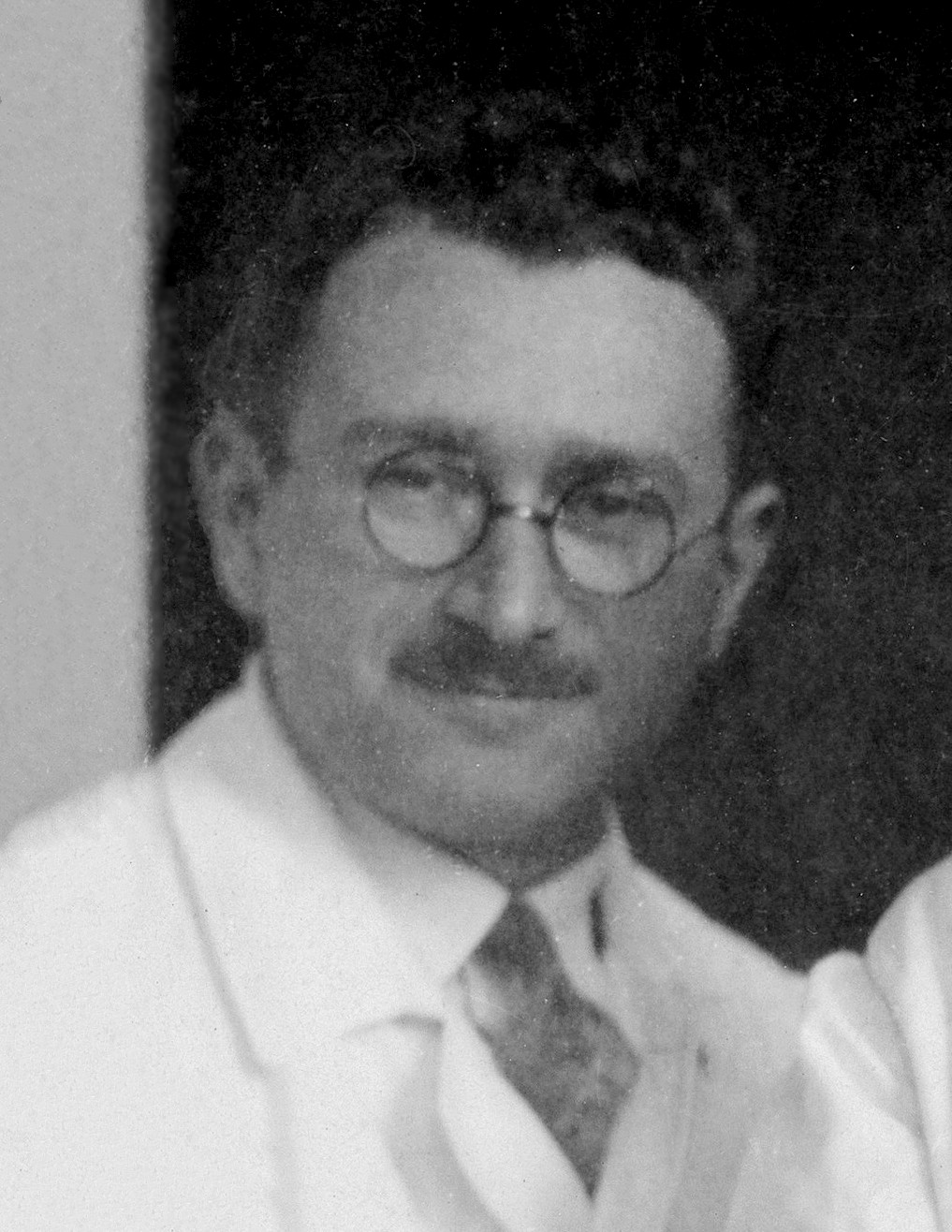
Sir Ludwig Guttmann, the neurologist who established the Paralympic Games

Before 1964, the Paralympics had not held an official closing ceremony in accordance with the tradition of the Stoke Mandeville Games, however Tokyo was the first to stage a formal closing ceremony setting a new tradition for subsequent events. The ceremony was held on Thursday 12 November at 5.00pm in the Olympic Gymnasium Annexe, "a grand amphitheatre", according to Australian Paraplegic. Once again it was attended by the Crown Prince and Princess who gave out numerous special prizes to the outstanding athletes of the Games in front of over 5000 spectators. Sir Ludwig Guttmann attended and gave a speech thanking the Japanese people and the organising committee for putting on such a wonderful event. "Everybody present collectively sang Auld Lang Syne and as the sound of thousands of people joining together rang out, the atmosphere was unforgettable and truly celebratory". The impact of the Games was felt when Japanese students and children raced to catch the hats of the athletes and participants who tossed them into the gathering crowds.

== Athlete's Reflection of the Games ==
Wheelchair Fencer Bill Mather-Brown: "Tokyo was way above Stoke Mandeville of '57 and the previous 1960 Rome Paralympics." "Athletes were far more highly trained and the Japanese conducted the whole affair in a most business-like manner".

Swimmer and Weightlifter Michael Dow: "I went there with absolutely no idea of how competitive the events would be". "I was quite chuffed with the two gold medals".

Swimmer Elizabeth Edmondson: "At the time I didn’t know how much the Paralympic Movement would grow because not much of a fuss was made". "My parents couldn’t come with me and there wasn’t much coverage of what happened".

"Without the Paralympic Games being accessible to the general public and without results being readily available, families and friends of athletes would eagerly await telegrams to hear the results of their loved ones", Edmondson recalls. "My parents received a telegram about my gold medals when I was in Tokyo and my sister remembers being called out of class as an eight year old to be told the news".

Edmondson also recalls the tight schedule and the events she competed in during the games. "I swam all three events on one night with no heats and there were only 25m and 50m events".

== See also ==
- Australia at the Paralympics
