= Australian Paralympic Table Tennis Team =

Australia was represented in table tennis at the 1960 Summer Paralympics. In the early Games, many table tennis players represented Australia in several events. It won eight medals - two gold, three silver and three bronze.

Gold medallists are:

- Daphne Ceeney and Marion O'Brien in 1964
- Terry Biggs in 1984
- Lei Lina in 2021 (2020 Summer Paralympics)
- Qian Yang in 2021 (2020 Summer Paralympics)

== Medal tally ==
Games	Gold	Silver	Bronze	Total
1960 Rome	0	1	0	1
1964 Tokyo	1	0	3	4
1968 Tel-Aviv	0	1	0	1
1972 Heidelberg	0	0	0	0
1976 Toronto	0	0	0	0
1980 Arnhem	0	0	0	0
1984 Stoke Mandeville	1	0	0	1
1988 Seoul	0	0	0	0
1992 Barcelona	0	0	0	0
1996 Atlanta	0	0	0	0
2000 Sydney*	0	0	0	0
2004 Athens	0	0	0	0
2008 Beijing	0	0	0	0
2012 London	0	0	0	0
2016 Rio	0	1	0	1
2020 Tokyo	2	4	0	6
2024 Paris	2	0	3	5
Totals (17 entries)	6	7	6	19

== Summer Paralympic Games ==
=== 1960 ===
Australia was represented by:
Men - Bruno Moretti, Bill Mather-Brown
Australia won a silver medal in Men's Doubles B - Bruno Moretti, Bill Mather-Brown.

=== 1964 ===
Australia was represented by:
Men - Allan McLucas
Women - Daphne Ceeney, Marion O'Brien, Elaine Schreiber
Australia won 1 gold and 3 bronze medals.

=== 1968 ===
Australia was represented by:
Men - Kevin Bawden, Alan Conn, Kevin Coombs, John Martin, Bill Mather-Brown, Allan McLucas, Bruno Moretti, Jimmy Newton, Tony South, Don Watts
Women - Lorraine Dodd, Daphne Hilton, Cherrie Loydstrom, Marion O'Brien, Elaine Schreiber, Pam Smith
Australia won 1 silver medal in Women's Doubles C - Marion O'Brien, Elaine Schreiber.

=== 1972 ===
Australia was represented by:
Men – Bob Millan, Cliff Rickard
Women - ?
Australia did not win any medals.

=== 1976 ===
Australia was represented by:
Men – Kevin Bawden, Wayne Flood, Ray Letheby, Peter Marsh, John Martin, Ross Soutar
Women – Elaine Schreiber Australia did not win any medals.

=== 1980 ===
Australia was represented by:
Men – Donald Dann, Peter Marsh, John Martin, John Sheil, Charlie Tapscott
Australia did not win any medals.

=== 1984 ===
Australia was represented by:
Men – Terry Biggs, Paul Croft, Garry Croker Joe Marlow, Errol Smith Women – Carmel Williams

Australian won a gold medal through Terry Biggs performance.

=== 1988 ===
Australia was represented by:
Men – Geoffrey Barden, Marcel Bucello, Paul Croft, Garry Croker, Jeremy Halloran, Craig Parson, John Sheil, Ian Simpson
Women – Carmel Williams
Australia did not win any medals.

=== 1992 ===
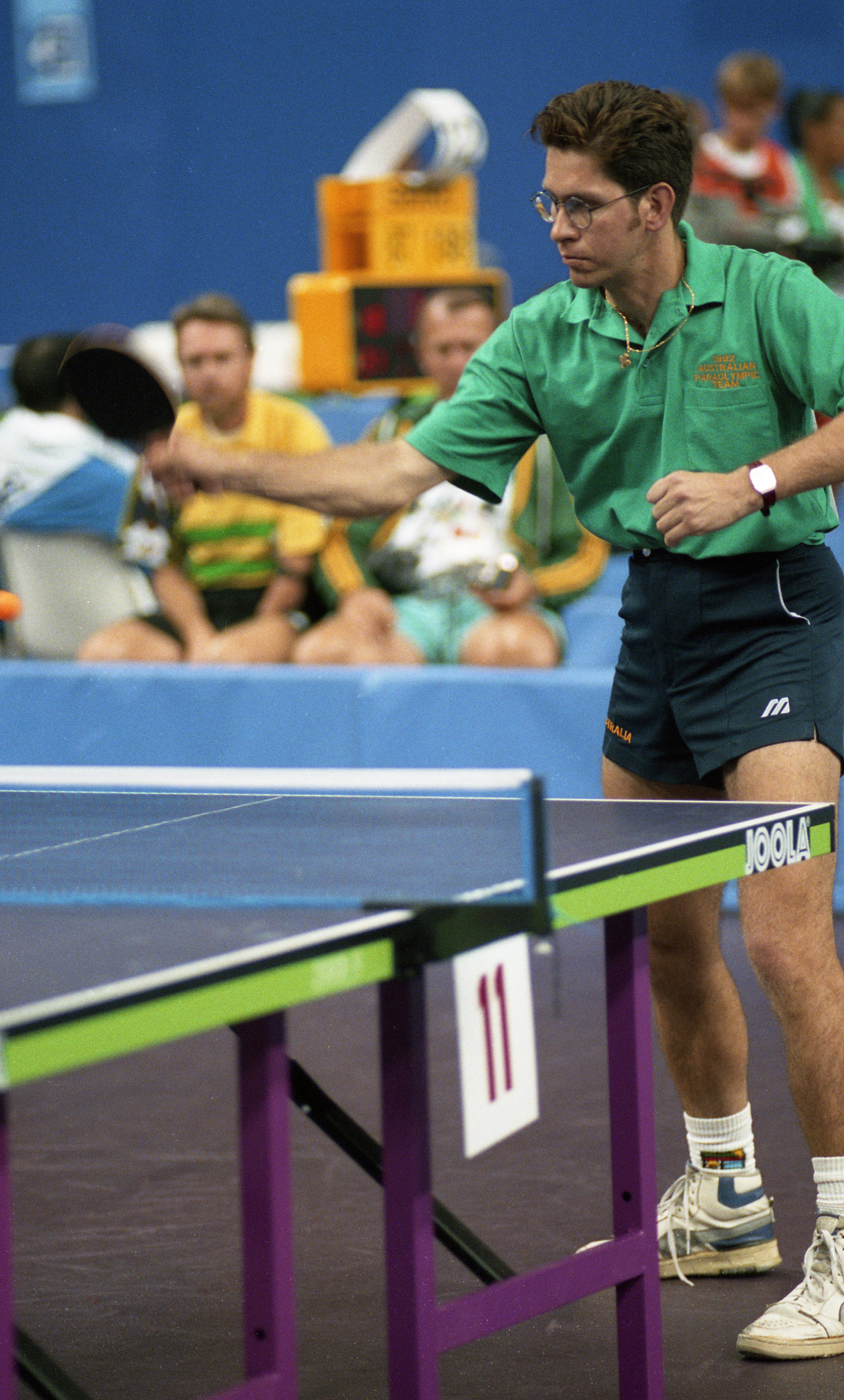
Australian table tennis player Csaba Bobary playing in Barcelona Paralympics

Australia was represented by:
Men – Csaba Bobory
Australia won no medals.

=== 1996 ===
No athletes

=== 2000 ===
Australia was represented by:

Men - Bill Medley, Ross Schurgott
Officials - Head Coach - Joe Hoad (Head); Officials - Carmel Medley
Australia was given two wild card entries due to it being the host nation. It did not win any medals as no athlete progressed past the first round.

=== 2004 ===
No athletes

=== 2008 ===
Australia was represented by:
Women - Rebecca Julian, Sarah Lazzaro
Officials - Head Coach - Brian Berry, Section Manager - Barbara Talbot. Catherine Morrow was selected but withdrew from the team.

Australia did not win any medals.

=== 2012 ===
Australia was represented by:
Women - Melissa Tapper, Rebecca McDonnell
Officials - Head Coach - Alois Rosario; Team Leader - Roger Massie
Australia did not win any medals.

=== 2016 ===
Australia was represented by:
Women - Daniela Di Toro, Melissa Tapper, Andrea McDonnell
Men - Barak Mizrachi, Samuel Von Einem
Officials - Head Coach - Alois Rosario; Team Leader - Roger Massie

Sam Von Einem in winning the silver medal won Australia's first medal since Terry Biggs won gold in 1984.

=== 2020 ===
Australia was represented by:
Women - Daniela Di Toro, Lei Li Na, Rebecca Julian, Yang Qian, Melissa Tapper
Men - Jake Ballestrino, Joel Coughlan, Trevor Hirth, Ma Lin, Nathan Pellissier, Samuel Von Einem
Officials - Head Coach -Alois Rosario; Assistant coaches - Maggie Meng; Team leader - Sue Stevenson; Skill Acquisition Specialist - Ross Pinder
Australia won two gold and four silver medals.Detailed Australian results.

=== 2024 ===
Australia was represented by:
Women - Daniela Di Toro, Lei Li Na, Yang Qian, Hayley Sands, Melissa Tapper
Men - Chris Addis, Jessy Chen, Trevor Hirth, Jimmy Huo, Ma Lin, Nathan Pellissier, Samuel Von Einem
Officials - Head Coach - Alois Rosario; Coaches - George Logothetis, Maggie Meng; Video analyst -Samuel Wells; Carer - Helen Smith
Australia won two gold and three bronze medals.Detailed Australian results.

== See also ==
- Table tennis at the Summer Paralympics
- Australia at the Paralympics
