= John Grant (neurosurgeon) =

Australian neurosurgeon and disability sport administrator

John MacDonald Falconar Grant, AO, OBE (14 August 1922 – 10 November 2013) was an Australian neurosurgeon and disability sport administrator. He was president of the 2000 Sydney Paralympic Games Organising Committee. He played a leading role in the development of disability sport in Australia.

== Personal ==
Grant was born on 14 August 1922 in Sydney. His parents were Chesborough Grant Falconar Grant and Henrietaa Thelma Leary. In 1945, he married Enid Llewlyn at St John's, Ashfield. They had three children: Stuart, Mandy, and Catherine.

Grant was put on the Worker's Party New South Wales Senate ticket at the 1975 Australian federal election due to a misunderstanding with John Singleton and asked to be removed; he was left on the ballot but was not elected.

His autobiography Different Theatres : From Neurosurgery to Sport for People with disabilities, published in 2005, provides insight into his work on medical and disability sport.

== Education ==
Grant attended Roseville Public School, Chatswood Intermediate School and North Sydney Boys High School. In 1945, he graduated from the University of Sydney with a Bachelor of Medicine and Bachelor of Surgery with Second Class Honours. Further education included a Master of Surgery of the University of Sydney, Fellowship of the Royal Australasian College of Surgeons, Fellowship of the American College of Surgeons, and a Fellowship of the Faculty of Rehabilitation Medicine in the Royal Australasian College of Physicians.

== Medical career ==
Grant was a resident medical officer at the Royal Prince Alfred Hospital, Sydney, where he undertook specialist training in general surgery and orthopaedic surgery followed by intensive training in neurosurgery. In 1952, he was appointed to Royal North Shore Hospital where he helped to establish its Department of Neurosurgery and Spinal Injuries Unit. He provided neurosurgical consultations to several acute hospitals in New South Wales, as well as the rehabilitation programs at Mt Wilga Rehabilitation Centre and the Spastic Centre of New South Wales. He retired from operative surgery in 2002.

== Disability sport career ==
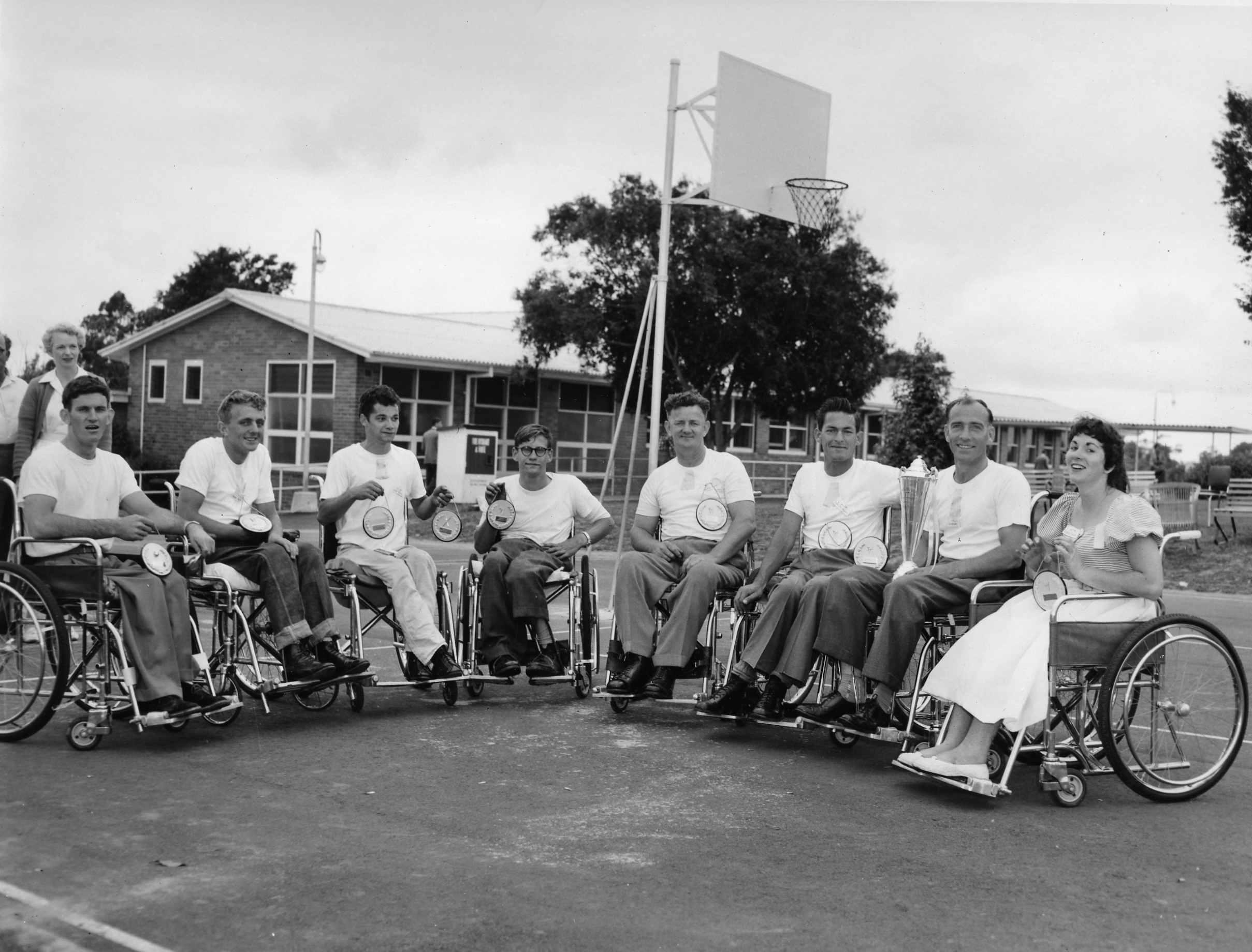
Mount Wilga Sports Day 1959. Grant, Kevin Betts and Eileen Perrottet played a major role in establishing this event

Grant's interest in the role of sport in the rehabilitation for people with spinal injuries can be linked to the work of Sir Ludwig Guttman, neurologist from Stoke Mandeville Hospital. In 1957, he visited the hospital and observed the role of sport in rehabilitation. In 1958, he played a major role in organising the First Royal North Shore Hospital Games for spinal injury patients. The Games were held at the Gore Hill Oval near the hospital. Grant also played a role in including sports in rehabilitation programs at Mount Wilga House. It held annual Sports Days. The Australian Team to the 1960 Rome Paralympics included eight competitors who had been patients at Mt Wilga Rehabilitation Centre and trained by Kevin Betts and Eileen Perrottet.

In 1961, he co-founded with Jack Ferguson the Paraplegic and Quadriplegic Association of New South Wales. He was president from 1968 to 2000. While President of this Association, he was instrumental in establishing the Junior National Wheelchair Games. He was the Medical Officer and Team Manager of the Australian teams that competed at the 1966 and 1970 Commonwealth Paraplegic Games. Grant and compatriate Graham Pryke were founding members of the FESPIC Games. In 1977, he was Chairman of the Organising Committee for the 2nd FESPIC Games held in Sydney.

In 1980, he wrote to the Minister for Sport, Bob Ellicott, stating the case for a national policy on sport for people with disabilities. Subsequently, the Australian Government established a national advisory committee on sports for disabled persons he was a member of. In 1993, he was the Chairman of the Sydney Bid Committee for the 2000 Paralympic Games. The successful bid led to Grant becoming President of the Sydney Paralympic Games Organising Committee 1994–2000.

Grant held leadership positions with several international disability sports organisations: President of International Stoke Mandeville Wheelchair Sports Federation, Chairman of the International Co-ordinating Committee of World Sports for the Disabled, and Member of the International Paralympic Committee.

== Recognition ==
=== General ===
- 1973 – Order of the British Empire – Officer (Civil) (OBE) for service to the community
- 1992 – Member of the Order of Australia (AM) for service to sport for disabled people
- 2002 – Officer of the Order of Australia (AO) for service to sport, particularly through the Sydney Paralympic Organising Committee, and to people with disabilities as a contributor to improving the range and quality of medical, social and sporting rehabilitation services

=== Medicine ===
- 2001 – Best Individual Contribution to Healthcare Award 2001 by the Australian Medical Association
- 2001 – ESR Hughes Medal by the Royal Australasian College of Surgeons
- 2007 – Doctor of Medicine (honoris causa), University of Sydney

=== Disability sport ===
- 1988 – Maengho Medal presented by the President of South Korea
- 1992 – Sir Ludwig Guttman Award for significant contribution to Wheelchair Sport in Australia
- 2002 – FESPIC Order
- 2002 – Gold Paralympic Order by the International Paralympic Committee
- 2009 – Wheelchair Sports New South Wales Champion Award
