= Perrottet (surname) =

Perrottet is a French surname. It most commonly refers to Dominic Perrottet (born 1982), an Australian politician and the 46th Premier of New South Wales.

Other notable people with the surname include:

- Eileen Perrottet (1917–1973), Australian physiotherapist
- George Samuel Perrottet (1793–1870), botanist and horticulturalist
