= Henry Marcus Clark =

Australian businessman

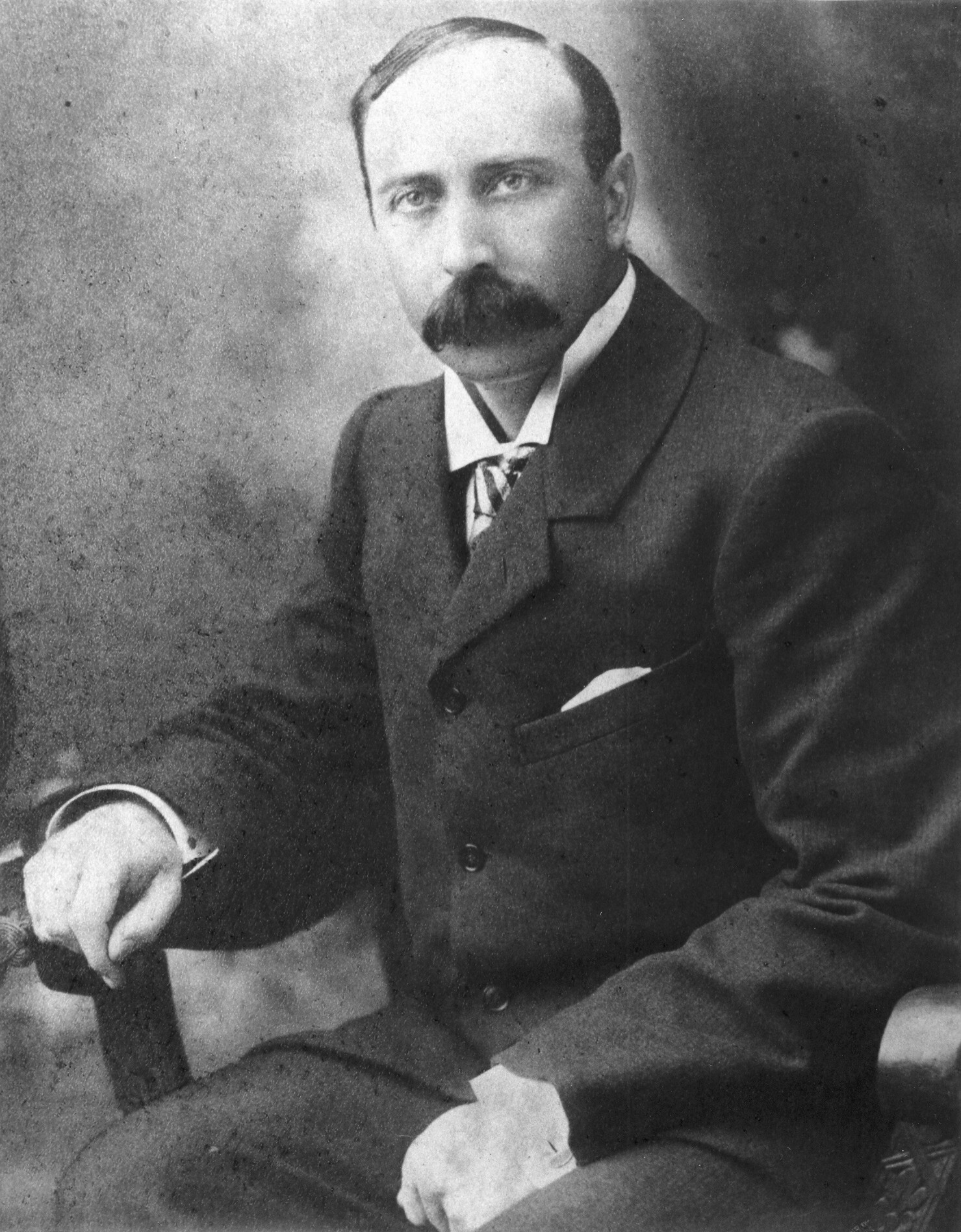

Henry Marcus Clark (15 September 1859 - 14 March 1913) was an Australian businessman who built a retailing empire known as Marcus Clark & Co., which consisted of a chain of Marcus Clark department stores.

== Migration to Australia and entering business ==
Clark was born in Liverpool, Lancashire, in 1859. He was the son of Cuthbert Anthony Clark, a silk merchant, and his wife, Charlotte Mary Clark (née Southee). He arrived in Australia from England in 1880, and lived briefly in Melbourne but soon traveled to Sydney by way of the goldfields at Parkes and Hill End. In 1882 he arrived in Sydney and was employed in John Kingsbury's drapery store in Newtown. In 1883 he married his first wife, and acquired Kingsbury's business. The business became Marcus Clark & Co. and rapidly expanded throughout New South Wales.

== Legislative Assembly ==
Clark stood unsuccessfully as an independent Free Trade candidate for the electorate of Newtown in the 1891 New South Wales colonial election.

== Family ==
In 1883 he married Martha Annie Day (known as Pattie). They had 5 children: Reginald Marcus (later Sir Marcus) (1883 – 1953), Hazel Pattie (1886 – 1982), Roland Cuthbert (1889 – 1973), Leslie Southee (1891 – 1975) and Byron Henry (1892 – 1899). Pattie died in 1892, and Clark married her younger sister Georgina May (known as May) two years later. They had 4 children: Daisy (1894 – 1894), Violet (1894 – 1894), George Sarsfield (1905 – 1992) and Marcia Adrienne May (born posthumously, 1913 – 2001).

== Houses ==
The Clarks moved from Newtown to Dulwich Hill in 1890, where they built a house named Sefton Hall, named after Sefton in Lancashire. Sefton Hall was the first house in Sydney to have a private swimming pool. That first Sefton Hall was demolished in 1914 and subdivided for housing. The Clarks purchased land near Hornsby in 1907, on which they built their winter house of Mount Wilga. They built a summer house in Mount Wilson in 1912, which they also named Sefton Hall. This replaced their Mount York home of Drachenfels, to which they never returned following the death of Clark's son, Byron, in a cliff fall in 1899. Drachenfels itself was destroyed by bushfire in 1902.

== Death ==
Clark died at Mount Wilson in 1913, aged 53. 1,200 people attended his funeral at Enmore. He is buried at Waverley Cemetery. St George's Church, Mount Wilson was built as a memorial to Clark by his children; there is a stained glass window of Jesus as The Light of the World in the church with a dedication to Clark.

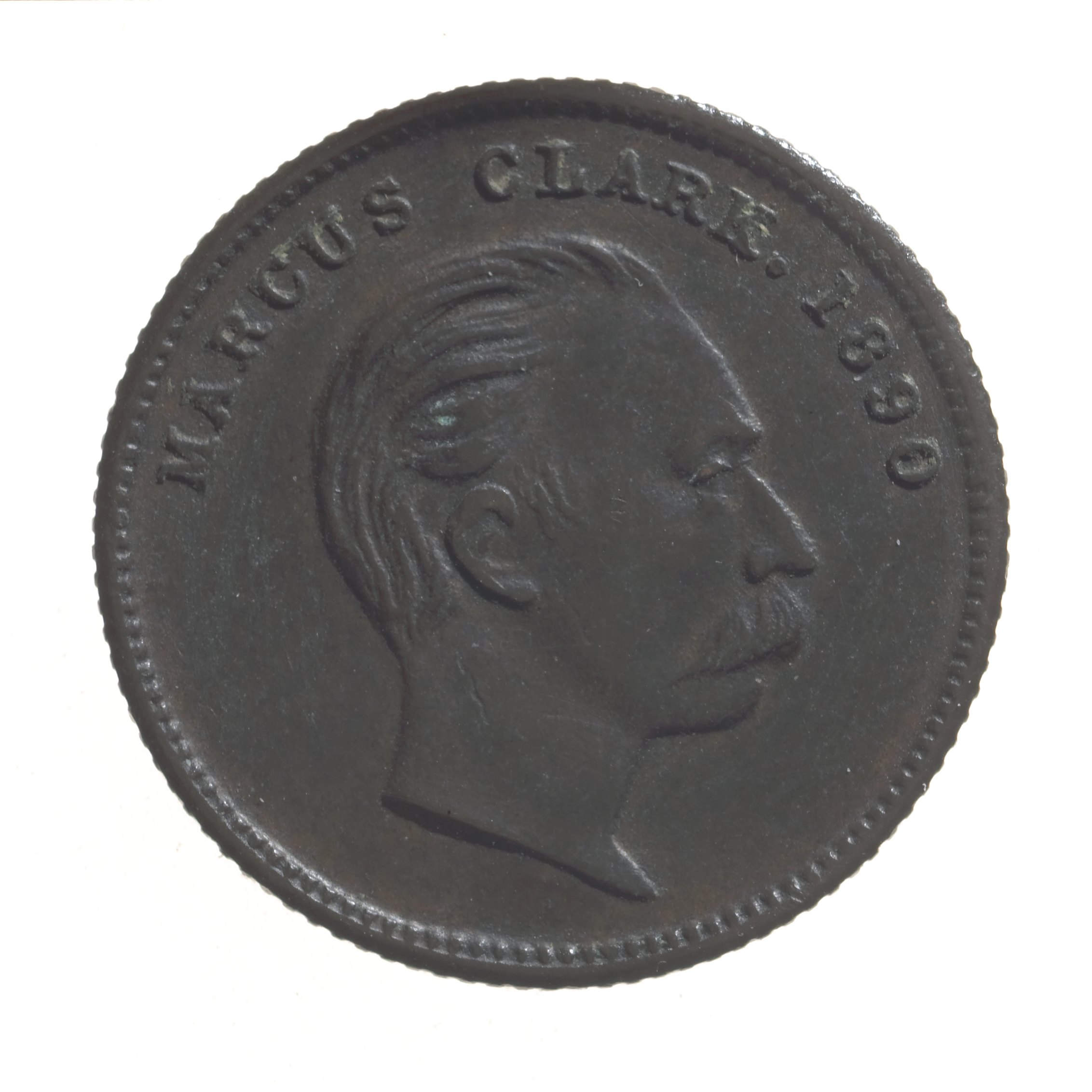
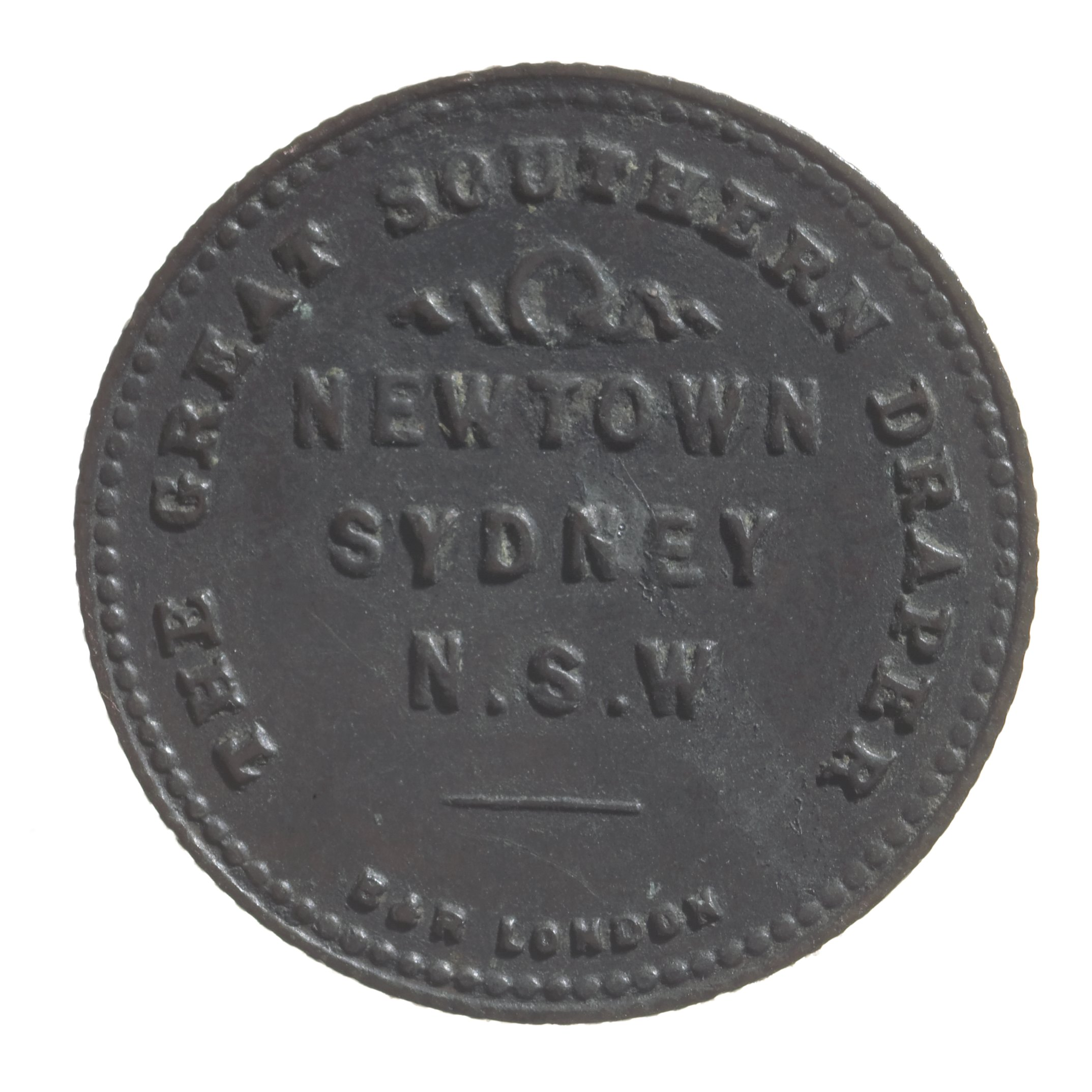

Medal - Marcus Clark, the Great Southern Draper, 1890
