= Elaine Schreiber =

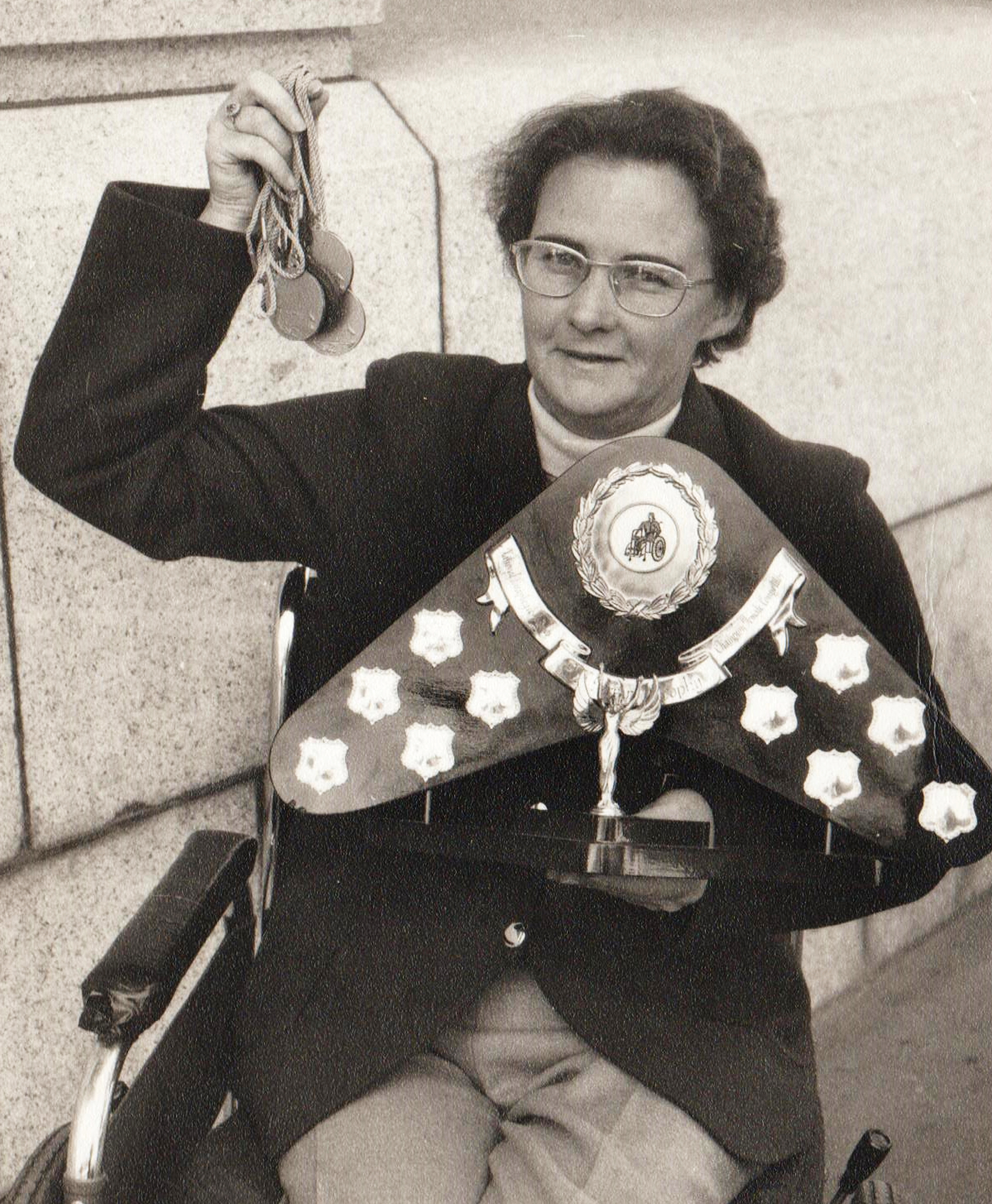

Personal information
- Nationality: Australia
- Born: 4 June 1939
- Died: 11 June 2017 (aged 78)
Medal record
Representing Australia
Athletics
Paralympic Games
| Gold medal – first place | 1964 Tokyo | Club throw A |
| Silver medal – second place | 1964 Tokyo | Javelin A |
Table tennis
Paralympic Games
| Silver medal – second place | 1968 Tel Aviv | Doubles class C |
| Bronze medal – third place | 1964 Tokyo | Singles class B |

Elaine Annette Schreiber (4 June 1939 – 11 June 2017) was an Australian Paralympic table tennis player and field games athlete. She contracted Poliomyelitis as a child.

Schreiber, who lived most of her life in Armadale Victoria, was a typist / telephonist employed by the St Kilda City Council, St Kilda Victoria. She worked in the Town Clerk's department for 17 years prior to the 1964 Summer Paralympics. Australian athletes at these games included quadriplegic Allan McLucas, the first quadriplegic to compete at International Paralympic Games. Schreiber, a member of the Paraplegic and Quadriplegic Association of Victoria, assisted with the fundraising to build a new hostel for quadriplegics to provide better living conditions and care under organised supervision.

Schreiber was selected to represent Victoria at the three day event of the Australian Paraplegic Games held in Adelaide, South Australia, September 1964. She was among the first sixteen gold medal athletes from Victoria, winning four gold medals at these games. Her success led to selection of one of only two Victorian athletes of the 15 member Australian team, to compete at the 1964 Summer Paralympics. At these games, she won Australia's fourth gold medal in the women's club throw A class event with a throw of 17.31 metres, a silver medal in the women's javelin A event with a throw of 9.26 metres, and a bronze medal in the women's table tennis singles B class event. Schreiber and fellow team member Daphne Hilton were two of only three female athletes who contributed to Australia gaining fourth place in the medal tally behind United Kingdom, USA and Israel, at the 1964 Summer Paralympics. At the Fourth Australian Paraplegic Games held in Brisbane Queensland, April 1966, Schreiber won seven gold medals in field events and table tennis, breaking the world record in precision javelin throw.

Following these games, Schreiber set her sights on the British Commonwealth Paraplegic Games, held in Kingston, Jamaica in 1966. She competed in table tennis B class singles and D class doubles with Australian Paralympian, Daphne Ceeney. In the women's events that followed, competing against the same three athletes, Schreiber won a gold medal in club throw B class (partially paralysed below the waist), with a throw of 63 feet 4 1/2 inches, a silver medal in discus B class and a gold medal in javelin B class with a throw of 34 feet 5 inches.

At the 1968 Summer Paralympics, Schreiber won a silver medal in the women's doubles table tennis C class event, with Western Australia athlete Marion O'Brien, but did not win medals in field events at these games. She competed in field events at the 1972 Summer Paralympics winning a bronze medal in javelin throw and a silver medal, also in javelin throw, at the 1976 Summer Paralympics, and participated in table tennis at the latter games.

A member of the Australian team who competed at the Stoke Mandeville Games in the United Kingdom in 1974, Schreiber competed in table tennis, javelin and shot put, winning three silver medals and one bronze. This was the sixth time Schreiber had represented Australia at International Games.

In 2000, she was awarded an Australian Sports Medal.

Schreiber died on 11 June 2017.
