= Marcus Clark & Co. =

Australian department store

- Industry: Retail
- Founded: 1883; 143 years ago Newtown, Sydney, New South Wales, Australia
- Founder: Henry Marcus Clark
- Defunct: 1960s
- Fate: Acquired by Waltons

Marcus Clark & Co was an Australian department store chain, founded by Henry Marcus Clark in 1883.

== History ==
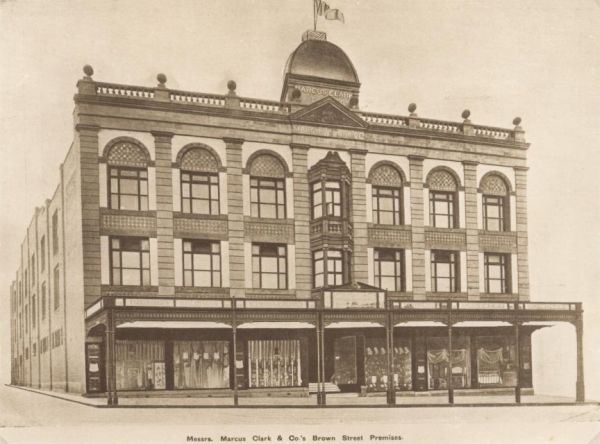
Newtown store, 1912

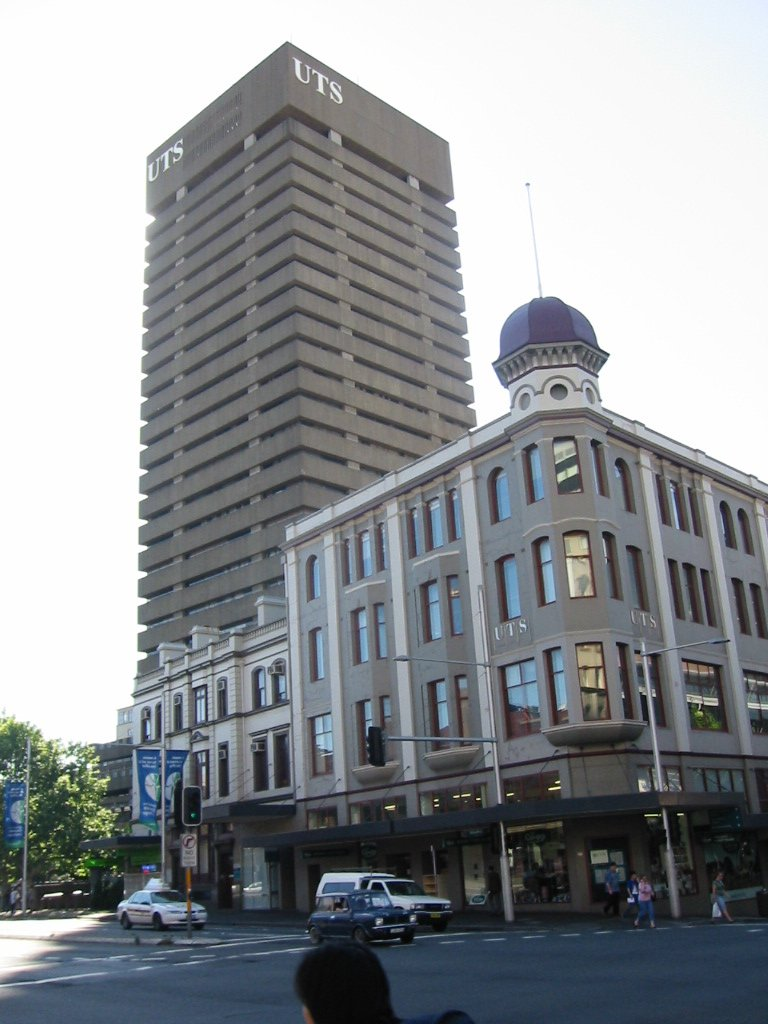
Bon Marche store on Broadway, now part of the University of Technology Sydney

The store started in the Sydney suburb of Newtown on 1 February 1883 as a two-window draper shop, and soon opened new stores in Marrickville and Bondi Junction. In 1896 a store closer to the city was opened on Broadway on the corner of Harris Street near Railway Square. It had a different concept and was stocked with less expensive wares and was called Bon Marche after the Paris department store. The store succeeded and in 1909 a larger building was constructed on the site to a design by Arthur Anderson. The building is now part of the University of Technology Sydney.

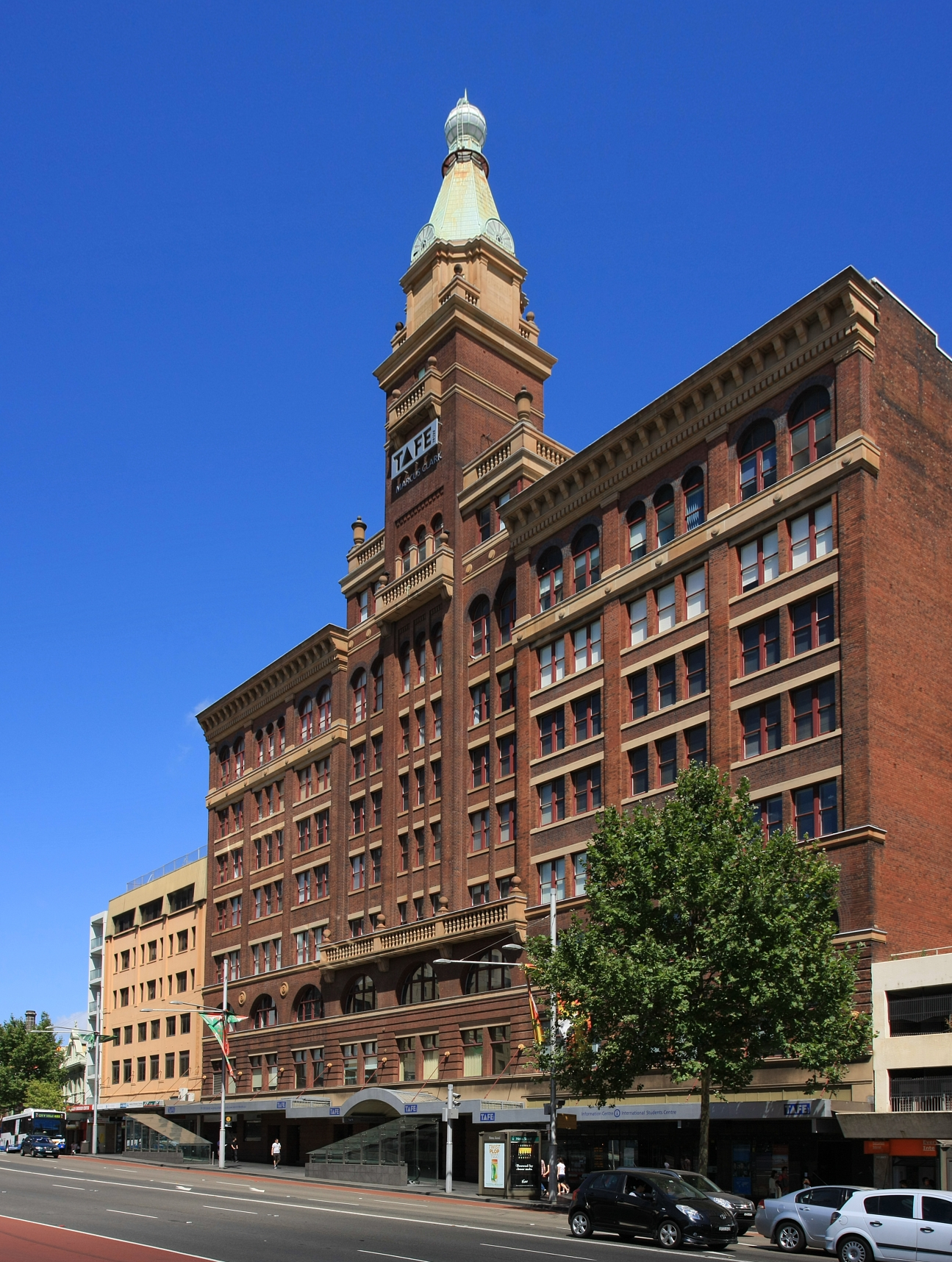
Marcus Clark building on Railway Square

In 1906, the company's headquarters were inaugurated in central Sydney, at the corner of George and Pitt Streets in Railway Square. The nine-storey building, which was designed by James Nangle, had been the site of a toll-gate previously. It was the tallest structure in Syndey at the time, rising 150 feet height.

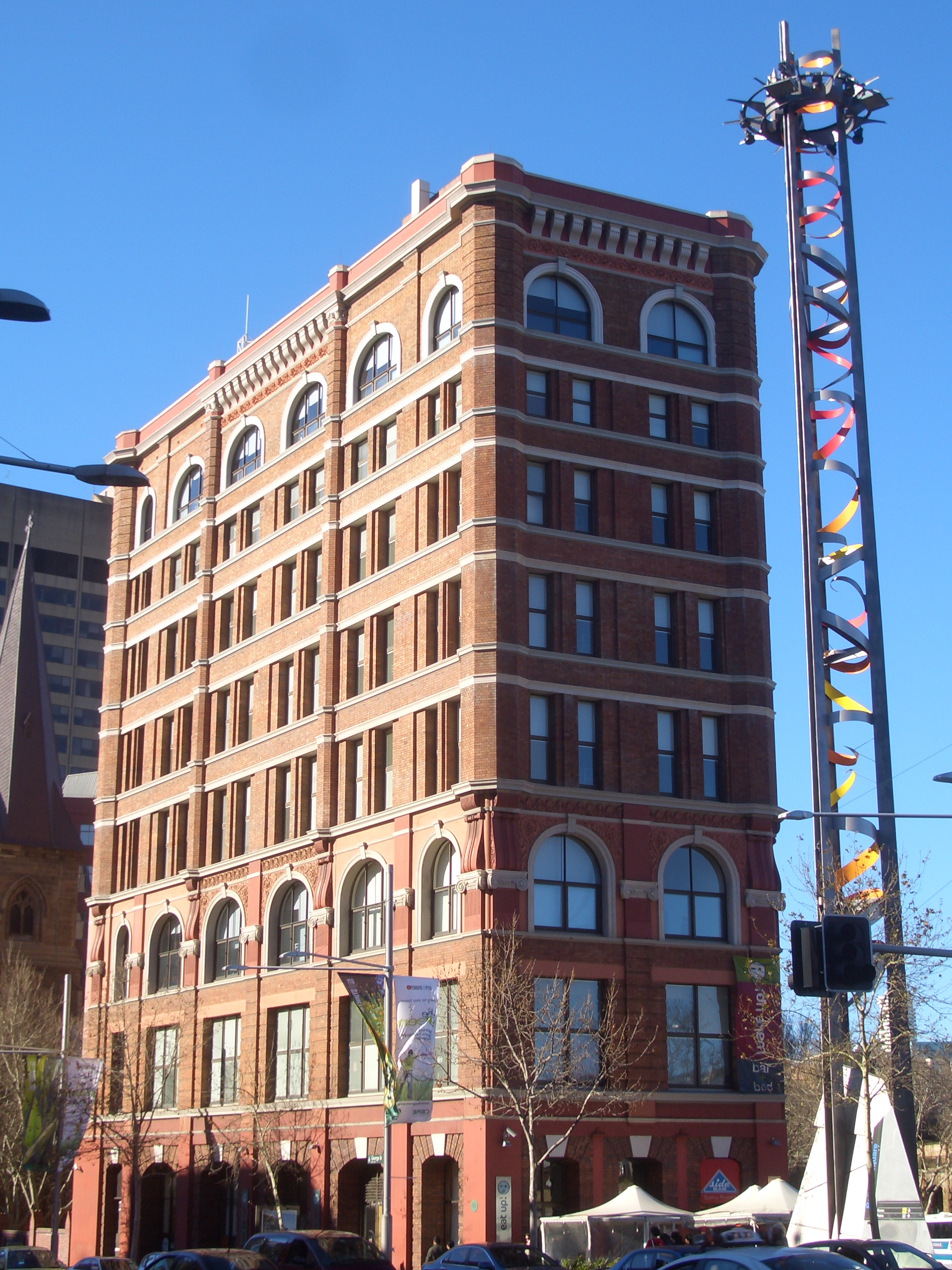
Marcus Clark "Flatiron" store on Railway Square

Henry Marcus Clark's early experience in Newtown may have alerted him to the advantages of regional and suburban retailing. Although a number of retailers opened branches outside the city after World War II, Marcus Clark & Co's growth was unprecedented: the 1915 Sands Directory listed stores in Newtown, North Sydney, Armidale, Dubbo, Goulburn, Gunnedah, Inverell, Lismore, Lithgow, Narrabri, Newcastle, Nowra, Tamworth and Wollongong. Many of these country locations were actually modest sized ‘sample rooms’ rather than large stores. However, they could still provide customers with personalized service and competed directly with city retailers like Anthony Hordern & Sons which made large profits from the lucrative mail order trade. Country customers could order goods and have them shipped from Marcus Clark & Co's city stores, conveniently located next to the parcels post office at Central station.

A new furniture showroom was constructed on Railway Square and was extended in 1928 by architects Spain & Cosh into a 10-storey building with a clock tower.

On the death of Henry Marcus Clark in 1913, his son Reginald Marcus Clark (1883-1953), who was knighted in 1939 and then known as Sir Marcus Clark, took over the business. The company continued in family hands until taken over by rival department store, Waltons, in 1966. Marcus Clark's Bon Marche store had already closed in 1961 and moved to the Sydney suburb of Liverpool and the Railway Square store closed in July 1965. Another son, Timothy Marcus Clark (16 December 1932 – 2015; ) was educated at The Scots College and Harvard Business School. He was a director of Marcus Clark & Co, Waltons, Commercial Bank of Australia, Henry Jones IXL and many other companies before becoming managing director of the State Bank of South Australia (and implicated in its collapse) and chairman of the (Adelaide) Grand Prix board.

With the changes in the retail scene in Australia in the 1960s Waltons bought out Marcus Clark & Co, followed by other department stores such as Anthony Hordern & Sons and McDowell's.
