= Eileen Perrottet =

Australian physiotherapist (1917–1973)

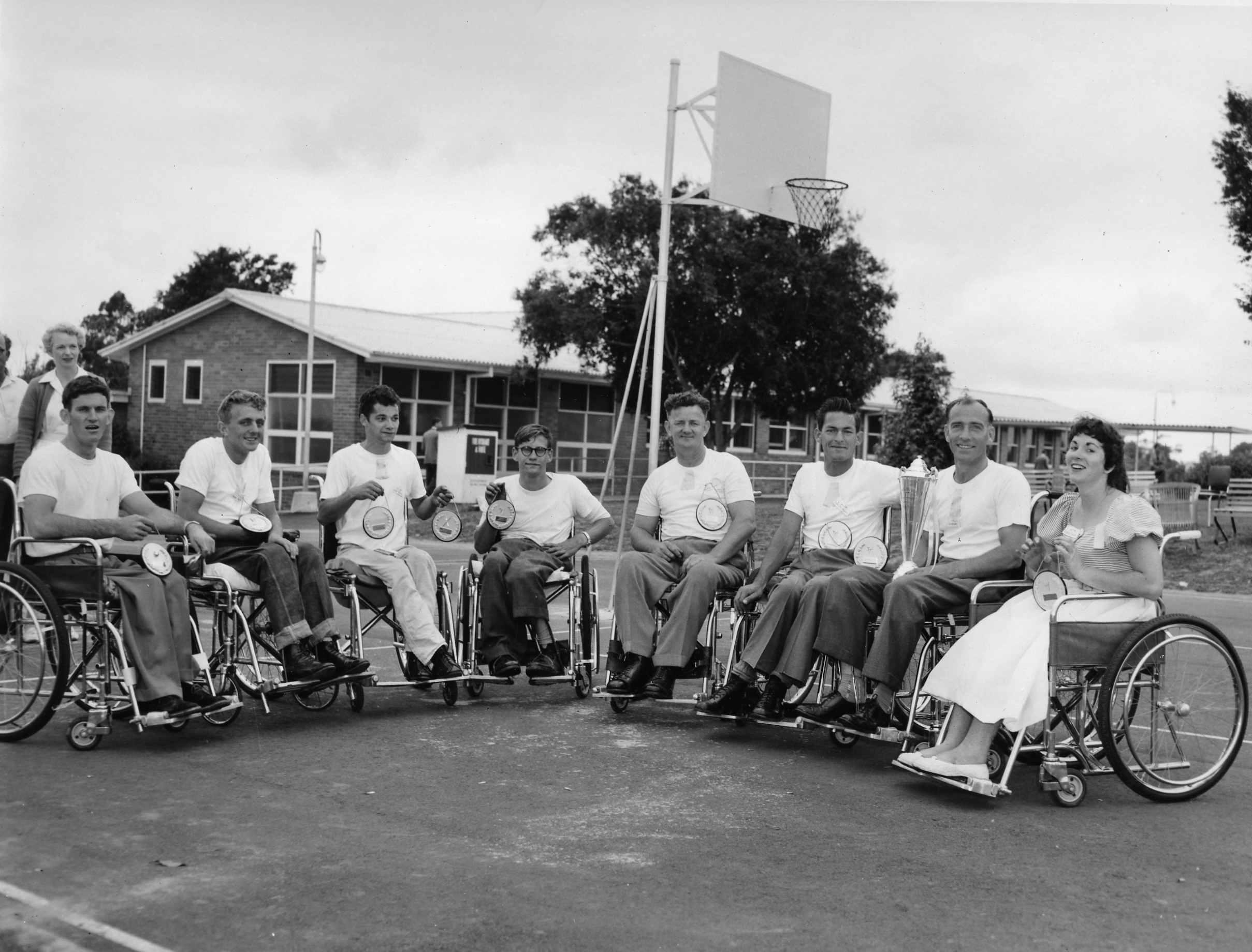
Mount Wilga Sports Day 1959, Perrottet in top left hand corner of photo

Eileen Mary Perrottet (24 December 1917 – 23 November 1973) was an Australian physiotherapist, noted for her contributions to the Australian Paralympic Movement, a senior physiotherapist at Mount Wilga Rehabilitation Hospital in the Sydney suburb of Hornsby.

== Early life ==
Perrottet's parents, constant visitors and supporters of Our Lady's Home for the sick and poor in the Sydney suburb of Coogee passed on the love of that work to their three children.

Perrottet, the youngest, was educated at Monte Saint Angelo Convent, North Sydney. She graduated from the University of Sydney as a physiotherapist.

== Career ==
Perrottet, who never married, enlisted in the Australian Army on 4 September 1942. She held the rank of Lieutenant, service number NFX 112337, and was a physiotherapist with the Australian Army Medical Core.

After the war, she went to London to further her professional career. George Bedbrook, the Australian orthopaedic surgeon who pioneered the Department of Paraplegia at the Royal Perth Hospital in Western Australia, was also at Stoke Mandeville Hospital, obtaining further knowledge and experience in orthopaedics, under Ludwig Guttmann, neurosurgeon and founder of the Paralympic Movement.

On her return to Australia, Perrottet went to Perth, to assist in establishing the first Paraplegic Centre in Western Australia. at Royal Perth hospital's spinal unit "where sport was seen as having an important role in rehabilitation". From there she was involved in organising Australia's first international disability sports team that attended the Stoke Mandeville Games (the forefather of the Paralympic Games), in London in 1957.

In 1959, Perrottet, senior physiotherapist at Mount Wilga Rehabilitation Centre (now a private hospital) in the Sydney suburb of Hornsby organised the first Paraplegic Games held in New South Wales, at the Mount Wilga Centre, which involved an intensive course of training. The North Shore Times reported that Perrottet worked tirelessly behind the scenes training, fund raising, morale boosting, to help assemble the New South Wales contingent for the first Australian team to compete at the 1960 Rome Paralympics.

Sport participation for the paraplegic is a medical therapy, said Perrottet and from the activity and participation there emerged the talent that enabled athletes from the 1959 team to be recruited for the 1960 Paralympic Games in Rome.

The three athletes selected, all from New South Wales, can be seen in the above photo. Daphne Hilton, seated to the extreme right, Ross Sutton, seated second from extreme left, and Gary Hooper seated on the extreme left, in front of Eileen Perrottet who is standing.

Paraplegic sport, a particularly successful activity at the Mount Wilga Centre was initiated by Perrottet according to John Tipping, vocational counsellor at the Centre. Perrottet "initiated Kevin Betts' interest in working with paraplegic patients who were at the time being assisted by the hospital's rehabilitation programs".

On 7 November 2018, the Eileen Perrottet Therapy and Wellness Centre was officially opened at Mount Wilga Private Hospital. Julian Leeser MP, Federal Member for Berowra in the Australian Parliament, opened the Centre. In his address to Parliament, he noted Perrottet's passion for utilizing sport as rehabilitation for spinal cord injuries, her dedication to the field of physiotherapy, an important person to be remembered not only in the history of Mount Wilga, but in the broader history of Paralympics Australia.
