= Trevor Hirth =

Australian para table tennis player

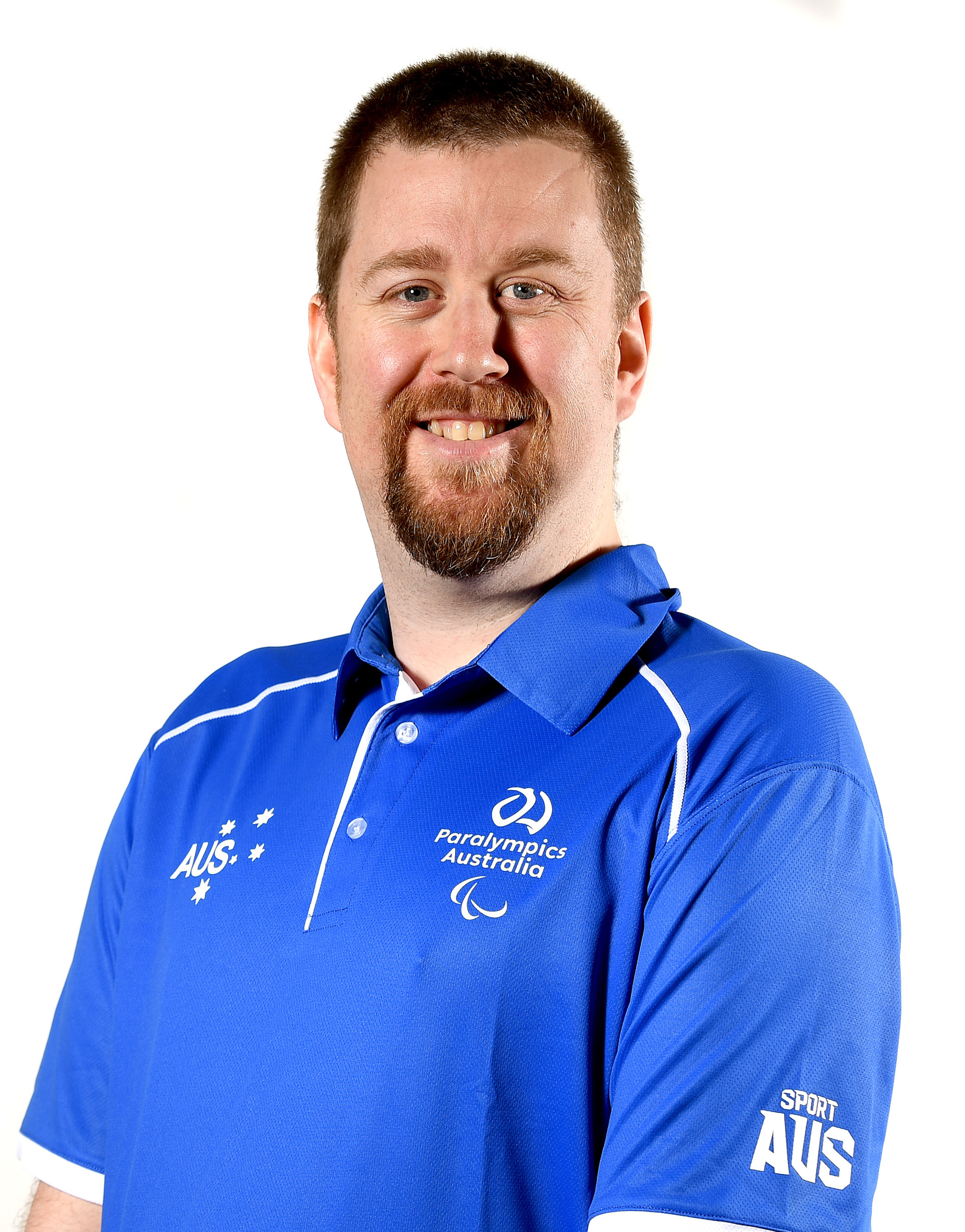
- Trevor Hirth in 2019

Personal information
- Nickname: Necrohammer
- Nationality: Australian
- Born: 29 February 1984 (age 42) Melbourne

Sport
- Country: Australia
- Sport: Table Tennis

Trevor Hirth (born 29 February 1984) is an Australian Paralympic table tennis player. He competed at the 2020 Tokyo Paralympics and the 2024 Paris Paralympics.

== Personal ==
Hirth was born on 29 February 1984. He has lived with a neuro-muscular disability since birth. His right leg is two centimeters shorter than his left, and his disability affects his power and strength and weakens his grip on the bat. As of 2021, he lived in Avondale Heights, Victoria. He works as a Disability Awareness Educator and Smash Down Barriers Technical Expert.

== Table tennis ==
He is classified as a C6 Para-table tennis player. Hirth was introduced to table tennis as a child, playing on a makeshift table his grandfather had built and set up in the carport of his family home. He was 29-years-old when he was spotted by an ex-Paralympic table tennis player at his local club and was told that he should try out for the Australian team.

He has won the Australian Championships in his class six times.

Hirth has won ten international medals, including gold at the 2013 and 2017 Oceania Para Table Tennis Championships. He has competed at three World Championships - 2014, 2017 and 2018.

Since 2018 he has been an International Table Tennis Federation Athletes' Commission Member.

At the 2020 Tokyo Paralympics, he lost two matches in the Men's Individual C6 and with Jake Ballestrino lost in the quarter-finals of Men's Team C6-7. Hirth competed at the 2024 Paris Paralympics in the Men's Singles 6 and Mixed Doubles 17 but did nor progress after the opening matches.
