= Mount Wilga House =

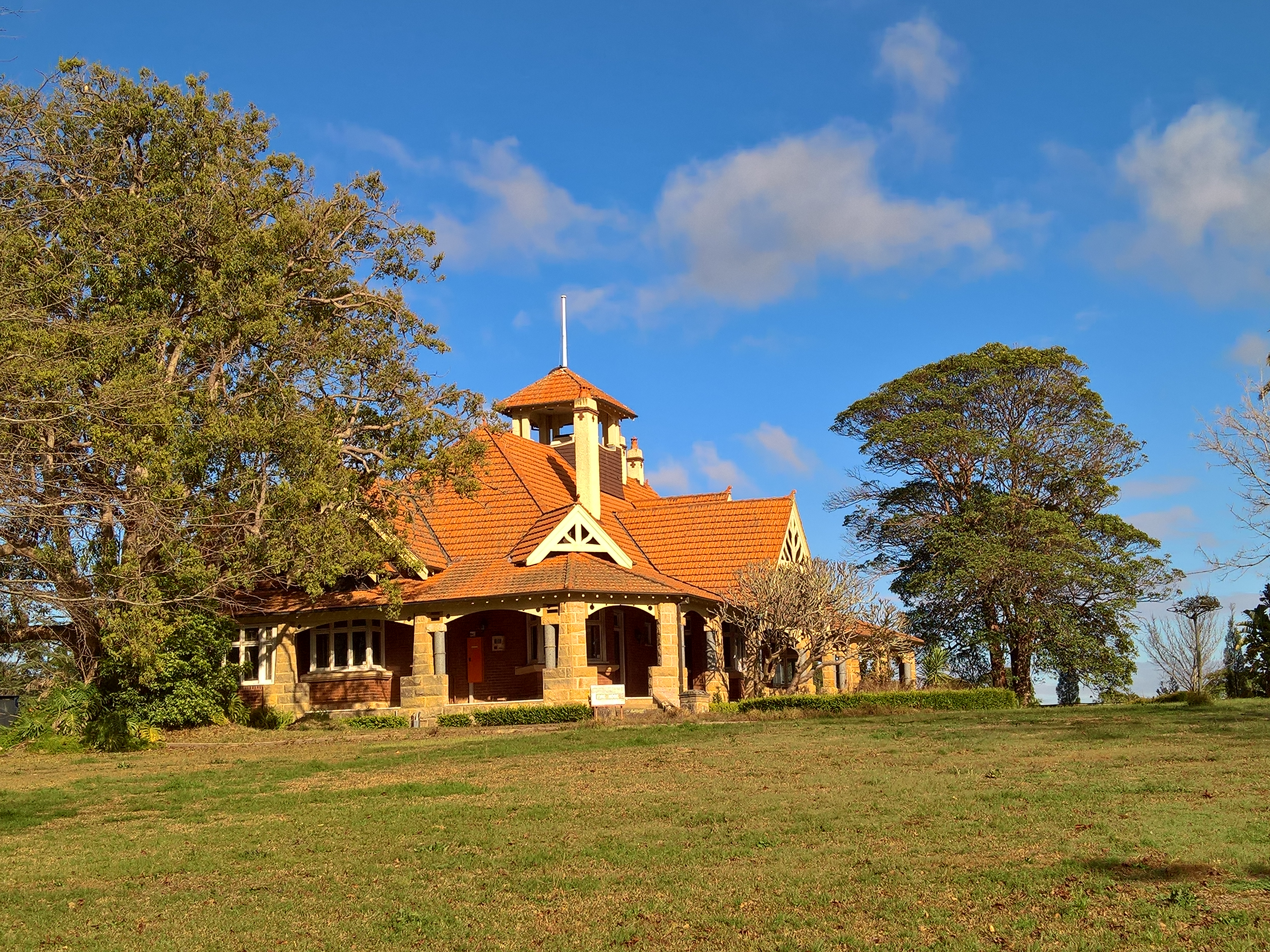
- Mount Wilga House, 2018

- Location within Sydney Location within Australia
- 33°41′33″S 151°05′37″E
- Location: 2a Manor Road (Rosamond Street), Hornsby, Hornsby Shire, New South Wales, Australia

History
- Built: 1913–1914

Site notes
- Architect: Henry Marcus Clark (attributed)
- Architectural style: Federation Queen Anne

New South Wales Heritage Register
- Official name: Mount Wilga House; Mt Wilga
- Type: State heritage (complex / group)
- Designated: 2 April 1999
- Reference no.: 535
- Type: Mansion
- Category: Residential buildings (private)

Mount Wilga House is a heritage-listed former residence and rehabilitation hospital at 2a Manor Road (Rosamond Street), Hornsby in the Hornsby Shire local government area of New South Wales, Australia. Its design is attributed to Henry Marcus Clark and was built from 1913 to 1914. It is also known as Mt Wilga. The property is privately owned. It was added to the New South Wales State Heritage Register on 2 April 1999.

== History ==
The North Shore railway line terminates at Hornsby, where it connects with the Main North line going to Brooklyn, Gosford, Newcastle and eventually the North Coast and Brisbane. The Northern Line was extended from Strathfield to the Hawkesbury in 1886, passing through the present suburb of Hornsby. The station was over three point two kilometres (two miles) from the village of Hornsby (modern day Normanhurst); so in 1895, the station was called Hornsby Junction to avoid confusion. In 1900, the word Junction was dropped and the area around the station became known as Hornsby. Old Hornsby was the name adopted for the present Normanhurst.

Mt Wilga Estate dates from an initial purchase in 1907 of 20 hectares (49 acres) at Hornsby by Georgina Clark, wife of the successful Sydney Draper and Retailer, Henry Marcus Clark. Additional purchases of 10.83 hectares (26.75 acres) acres and 18 hectares (45 acres) were made between 1907 and 1908.

In 1908, Clark built a 160-metre (520 ft) long suspension bridge over the deep gully which lies between Mt Wilga and Hornsby railway station to facilitate the arrival of guests to the property from Sydney.

Prior to Mt. Wilga, Clark had resided in "Sefton Hall" in Marrickville Road, Dulwich Hill, which was named after a property in England.

Mt. Wilga was reputedly designed by the owner and planned along similar lines to his summer home "Sefton Hall" at Mount Wilson in the northern Blue Mountains. It was intended to be Marcus Clark's winter home. The original garden as planned by Clark reflected an aesthetic of defining the property boundary and main access route as well as concealing the house from direct view and then revealing the house at journey's end. A formal area of the garden was laid out to the north of the house and open paddocks and orchard to the west of the house. To the south and south east was a service area.

However, Clark died in 1913 during the construction of the large single storey Federation Queen Anne style house. It was completed in 1914 by his widow, Georgina Clark. The Clark family resided at Mt Wilga until 1919. Henry's son, Les Clark, built a very similar house "Dulcidene Homestead" in Dubbo.

In 1926, Mrs Georgina M Clark sold the house and a portion of its land to Miss Jessie Hamilton Scott of Hornsby who subdivided the land creating Manor Road. In 1928, the subdivision of Mt Wilga into 67 residential allotments was initiated. The large allotment containing Mt Wilga house remained in private hands until its sale in 1952 to the Commonwealth of Australia for use as a rehabilitation hospital.

In 1948, the property was owned by a Dr Smallpage. The Mt Wilga Rehabilitation Hospital operated between 1952 and 1987. During the 35-year period, the estate and house were altered to accommodate the functions and facilities of a rehabilitation hospital. Several large buildings were constructed on site. During the 1950s, the hospital had a major role in the founding of the Australian Paralympic movement, led by staff members John Grant, Eileen Perrottet, and Kevin Betts.

In 1985, Howard Tanner & Associates (HT&A) prepared 'Mt Wilga, Hornsby NSW: Conservation Management Plan for the Administration Building' for the Commonwealth Department of Housing and Construction. In January 1987, Howard Tanner wrote to the then Heritage & Conservation Branch advising of the impending sale of the property by the Australian Government. In March 1987, HT&A wrote to the Heritage & Conservation Branch making recommendations for a site curtilage based on historic and contemporary conditions.

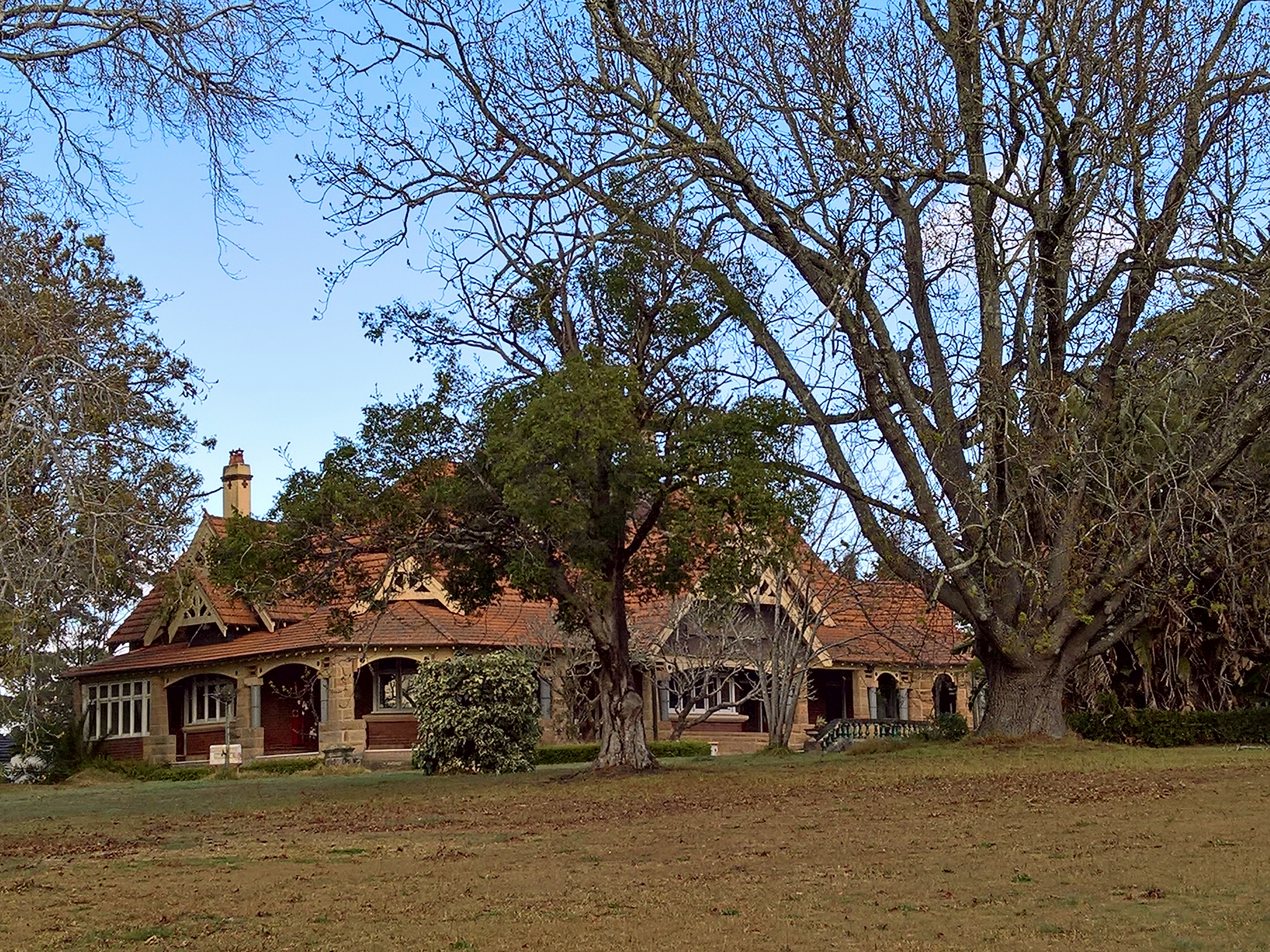
Mount Wilga House

Concern over the future of the site led to the placement of a Permanent Conservation Order (PCO) #535 over the house and some of the curtilage on 4 September 1987. This is understood to have taken place prior to the sale of the property.

In late 1987, (post PCO listing) Alpha Pacific purchased the site for use as a private rehabilitation hospital, and in July 1988, sought to subdivide the site. The Heritage Council refused the application which sought to reduce the curtilage around Mt Wilga. A modified proposal to subdivide the site into two large allotments was subsequently approved by the Heritage Council. Consequently, Lot 2 DP 792198 was sold in 1990 to the Japan-based Buddhist sect, the Nichiren Shoshu Sokagakkai Australia and run as a Buddhist Cultural Centre. The northern Lot 1 DP 792198 continued to operate as a private hospital.

The original garden as planned by Marcus Clark reflected an aesthetic of defining the property boundary and main access route as well as concealing the house from direct view and then revealing the house at journey's end. The formal area of the garden which existed to the north of the house and open paddocks and orchard to the west of the house were lost during the development of the hospital. The extant grounds to the south and southeast of the house were formerly the service area of the property. In their present state, the grounds reflect the reduction of the gardens and expansion of open lawn areas, the gradual attrition and simplification of planting and the removal of the majority of the trees, associated with the institutional management of the site.

In August 1991, a Conservation Management Plan was prepared by Robertson & Hindmarsh Pty Ltd for Soka Gakkai International Australia, a Buddhist group who made a number of small modifications to the house and outbuildings. These included repainting the interior and exterior of the house, carpeting, refurbishing a former minor building into a women's temple and various services were partially separated from the hospital to the north. Although the group planned further extensions to the temple facilities, they moved from the site in 1999 and these modifications were never initiated.

The site was sold to a consortium wanting to construct a SEPP5 aged-care facility. From 1999, the site has been vacant, or served once again as a private residence.

In August 1999, Scott Robertson of Robertson & Hindmarsh Pty Ltd was engaged by Mirrabeema Project Management on behalf of the Mt Wilga Village Consortium to prepare "Conservation Management Plan of Mt Wilga, 2a Manor Road, Hornsby". At its meeting of 20 January 2000, the Heritage Council provided its general terms of approval to an amended integrated development application. On 9 June 2000, delegated conditional approval was granted to the subsequent section 63 application. On 6 October 2000, delegated conditional approval was granted to a further section 63 application under the Heritage Act.

Since 2006, one residential allotment facing Manor Road (known as Lot 2 in DP 1181742), outside the NSW State Heritage Register curtilage boundary, has been subdivided off the property. This lot was previously occupied by a cottage on the Mount Wilga estate, which was demolished c. 2000.

The site was sold in 2008 to Austcorp Project No. 1 Pty Ltd. Between 1999 and 2010, a series of unsuccessful attempts by several owners were made to adapt the site for medium-high density retirement living. During this time, many buildings with little heritage significance were demolished and many conservation works to the house were completed. The current owners bought the homestead site in 2010. Additions to the hospital were approved in 2011. A four–lot subdivision (three small lots on the southern boundary, one large lot for the house) was withdrawn and later a two–lot subdivision was approved (for the current owners) in 2012. In 2015, a major renovation and extension plan was approved for the current owners with the aim of upgrading the house and grounds to a modern family residence. Approved extensions include under-house garaging for multiple vehicles, a large verandah extension to the southern side of the house, and a swimming pool. A further three lot subdivision (two small lots on the southern boundary, one large lot for the house) was approved in 2017. As of 2023, the homestead is in the hands of the family that purchased the property in 2010.

== Description ==
Site

Federation mansion and garden prominently sited in large grounds on the apex of a long ridge with commanding views of the surrounding countryside, including across the valley to "neighbouring" mansion, Mount Errington.

Garden

The original garden planned by Clark reflected an aesthetic of defining the property boundary and main access route as well as concealing the house from direct view and then revealing the house at journey's end. A formal area of the garden was laid out to the north of the house and open paddocks and orchard to the west of the house. To the south and south east was a service area. Despite subdivision and loss of land to the north and east, a generous area of garden surrounds the house to the east and south. This retains the core of the eastern garden, driveway and a good part of the former service area, including the tennis court, bowling green and site of the former chicken house. Subdivision and redevelopment of the hospital to the north and west has greatly altered much of the estate's land there and encroaches fairly close to the carriage loop and western boundary of Mt. Wilga.

Period elements remaining on the site include border planting around the perimeter of the house.

A grand drive sweeps south-west from Manor Road leading up to a fine circular carriage drive in front (north) of the house (formerly gravel, now bitumen) with central planting plot and dominant Canary Island date palm (Phoenix canariensis) to 14 metres (46 ft) high. (This possibly dates from c. 1920s as it is not evident in a 1917 photograph). The original long drive sandstone castellated gate arch structure no longer exists – it has been replaced with a modest brick pillar modern steel gates in the hospital era), but an eastern pedestrian entrance constructed of sandstone remains. This eastern entrance is covered by climbing fig (Ficus pumila var. pumila) and retains an intact wrought iron period gate.

Mt Wilga's grounds include large sloping lawn areas to the house's east and south, a tennis court to its east, a bowling green to its south-east and some shrubbery (seemingly reduced in quantity).

Large mature trees including bunya-bunya pine (Araucaria bidwillii), Port Jackson or rusty fig (Ficus rubiginosa) and Monterey pines (Pinus radiata) to 20 metres (66 ft) (probably from c. 1910) camphor laurels (Cinnamomum camphora) and brush box (Lophostemon confertus) to a 16m evergreen /southern magnolia / bull bay (Magnolia grandiflora) and crepe myrtle (Lagerstroemia indica). Along the southern boundary there is a row of turpentine trees (Syncarpia glomulifera) to 15m high which have grown since the 1950s and, further to the south-west adjoining the former service driveway to the former garage, a Himalayan cedar (Cedrus deodara), book leaf cypress/arborvitae (Platycladus orientalis) and brush box trees (now outside the boundary to the west near the former service drive).

Also mature trees on site include two sweet gums (Liquidambar styraciflua), two frangipani (Plumeria rubra) flanking the front steps to the house, a rare jambos/ rose apple (Syzygium jambos) tree on the eastern boundary near the entrance drive, an ironbark tree west of the house (Eucalyptus sp., possibly E.crebra), a NZ flax bush south of the drawing room (Phormium tenax) and a large Chinese wisteria (Wisteria sinensis) on the wire mesh fence of the tennis court.

Younger tree plantings on the eastern lawn include tupelo or sour gum (Nyssa sylvatica), Camellia sasanqua, a mature Japanese maple (Acer palmatum) and native cheese tree (Glochidion ferdinandi).

A weld-mesh boundary fence is modern (dating from the hospital era) and inappropriate to the style of the grounds (LEP).

Residence

Federation mansion with face brick walls, complex steep pitched terracotta tiled roof, tall roughcast chimneys, shingled and half-timbered gables, sandstone veranda piers with simple scalloped timber valences. Unusual cylindrical polished granite colonettes support the timber veranda posts.

The residence is a single storey with a basement and three-storey tower at the roof apex. Original casement windows include projecting bays with leadlight and sculpted sandstone sills. Original doors and other joinery remains. Much of the original interior survives. The residence is prominently sited in large grounds with a number of large trees and a stone gateway (LEP).

=== Modifications and dates ===
2007-8: 88 units with basement parking: repairs and maintenance work to preserve the fabric of the building, including the:

- removal of glazing to the tower reinstate the lookout at the summit o the tower;
- replication of stolen items from the house (using documentary evidence) will improve the presentation of the house and allow an understanding of its decoration. This replication will restore significance that has been lessened by the theft of joinery items and lighting fixtures.
- reconstruction of the stone gate will ensure its survival, restore its significance, enable an understanding of is significance as part of Marcus Clark's pedestrian link to Hornsby across the gully, enhance its appearance and ensure public safety;
- relaying original tiles on a new slab will prevent subsidence and protect the tiles from substrate collapse; and
- rebuilding the north-west corner of the front veranda will ensure the survival, while using the existing timber and stone elements.

== Heritage listing ==
As at 18 September 2014, outstanding late Federation Queen Anne style mansion. Impressive multi-level roof with highly decorated gables. Unusual verandah detailing. Generally in good condition. Many interior features of note. Owned by Marcus Clark leading Sydney retailer of the time. Grounds: Remnant garden layout surrounding notable mansion. Mature period trees dated from Federation period. Of regional significance.

Mount Wilga House was listed on the New South Wales State Heritage Register on 2 April 1999.

== See also ==
- Australian residential architectural styles
