= Lionel Cousens =

Australian Paralympic archer

Personal information
- Nationality: Australia
- Born: Western Australia
Medal record
Archery
Paralympic Games
Silver medal – second place	1964 Tokyo	Men's St. Nicholas Round Team open

Lionel Cousens is an Australian Paralympic archer. He was born in Western Australia. At the 1964 Tokyo Games, he won a silver medal in archery in the Men's St. Nicholas Round Team open event.
