= Michael Dow =

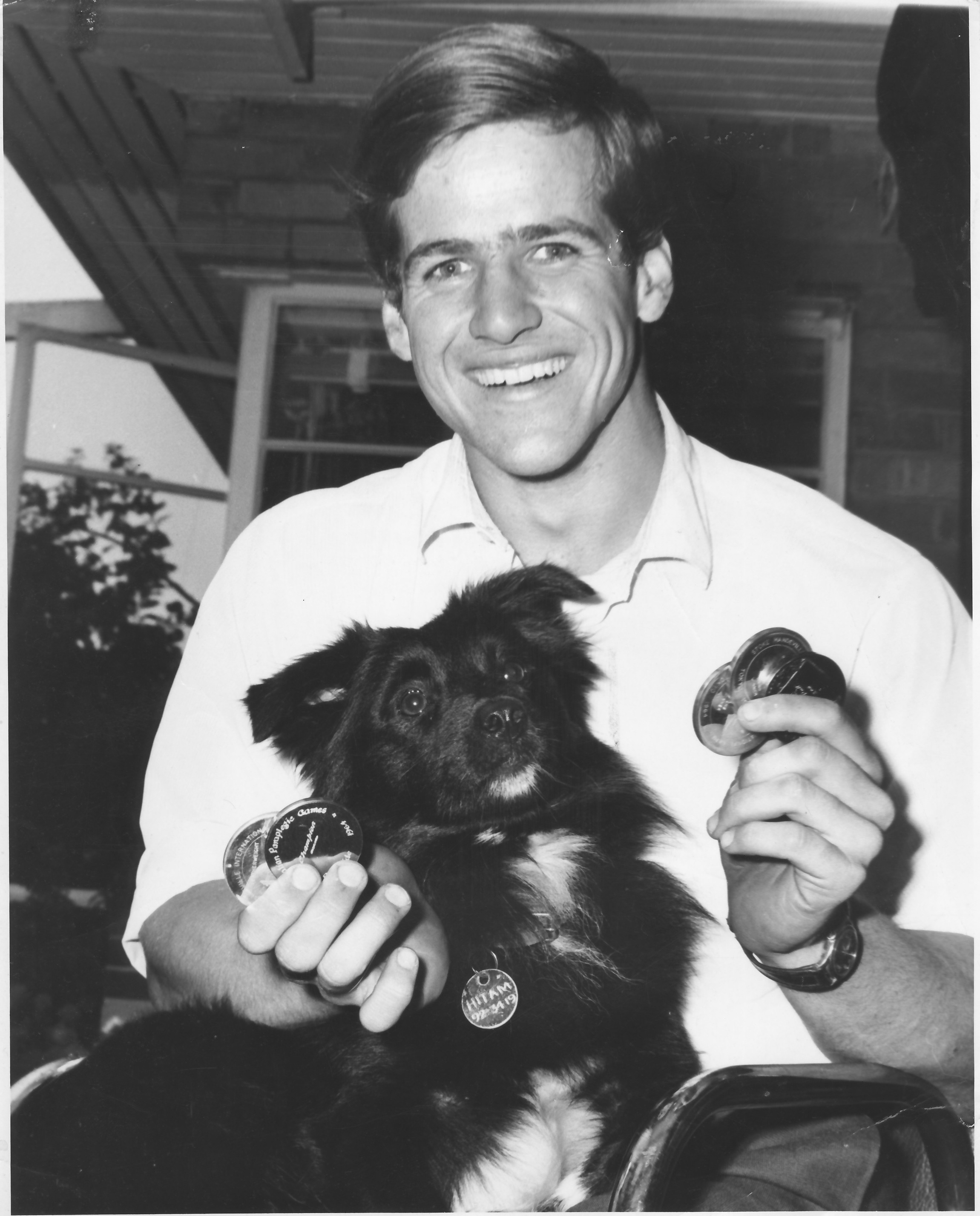
- Michael Dow and his dog, Hitam, displaying his five Olympic medals from the 1964 Tokyo Paralympic Games

Personal information
- Nationality: Australia
Medal record
Paralympic Games
Swimming
Gold medal – first place	1964 Tokyo	Men's 50 m Breaststroke incomplete class 3
Gold medal – first place	1964 Tokyo	Men's 50 m Freestyle Supine incomplete class 3
Bronze medal – third place	1964 Tokyo	Men's 50 m Freestyle Prone incomplete class 3
Weightlifting
Silver medal – second place	1964 Tokyo	Men's Featherweight
Athletics
Silver medal – second place	1964 Tokyo	Men's 4 x 60 metre wheelchair relay

Michael Dow is an Australian Paralympic swimmer and weightlifter who won two gold, two silver and a bronze medal at the 1964 Summer Paralympics. He was one of only two Victorian athletes selected to compete at these games.

== Biography ==
Dow contracted poliomyelitis at 4 years of age while living with his family in Borneo. The family moved to Venezuela in 1954 and returned to Melbourne Victoria in 1959. His interest in sport developed through newspapers, that included articles about sporting opportunities for disabled people and achievements of people with spinal cord injuries. In addition, the Victorian Paraplegic Sports Club supported local, national and international competitions for people with a disability which included the Victorian Championships held annually at Albert Park, The Australian Championships held bi-annually, and the Inaugural Commonwealth Games held in Perth Western Australia, in November 1962. This event is held every four years.

Selection for the 1964 Summer Paralympics was based on Dow's outstanding results achieved at the National Championships. He competed in sprint, long-distance track, javelin, and weightlifting that was an Australian innovation, the program being developed in Perth.

At the 1964 Summer Paralympics, he won two gold medals in the Men's 50 m Breaststroke incomplete class 3 and Men's 50 m Freestyle Supine incomplete class 3 events, a silver medal in Men's Weightlifting Featherweight event, a bronze medal in the Men's 50 m Freestyle Prone incomplete class 3 event., and a silver medal in the 4 x 60 metre wheelchair relay.

Following his outstanding results at the 1964 Paralympics, Dow then decided to retire and concentrate on his studies. In 1970, he completed his Bachelor of Arts Degree at Monash University Melbourne.

Dow dropped out of competition for ten years, returned in 1979 and again in 1981 to compete in the Australian Paraplegic Championships. He then retired from competitive sport.
