= Trevor French =

Australian Paralympic swimmer

Personal information
- Nationality: Australia
- Born: 2 February 1936
- Died: 22 August 2012 (aged 76)
Medal record
Swimming
Paralympic Games
Silver medal – second place	1964 Tokyo	Men's 25 m Freestyle Supine complete class 2

Trevor French (2 February 1936 – 22 August 2012) was an Australian Paralympic swimmer. At the 1964 Tokyo Paralympics, he won a silver medal in the Men's 25 m Freestyle Supine complete class 2 event.
