= Jake Ballestrino =

Australian para table tennis player

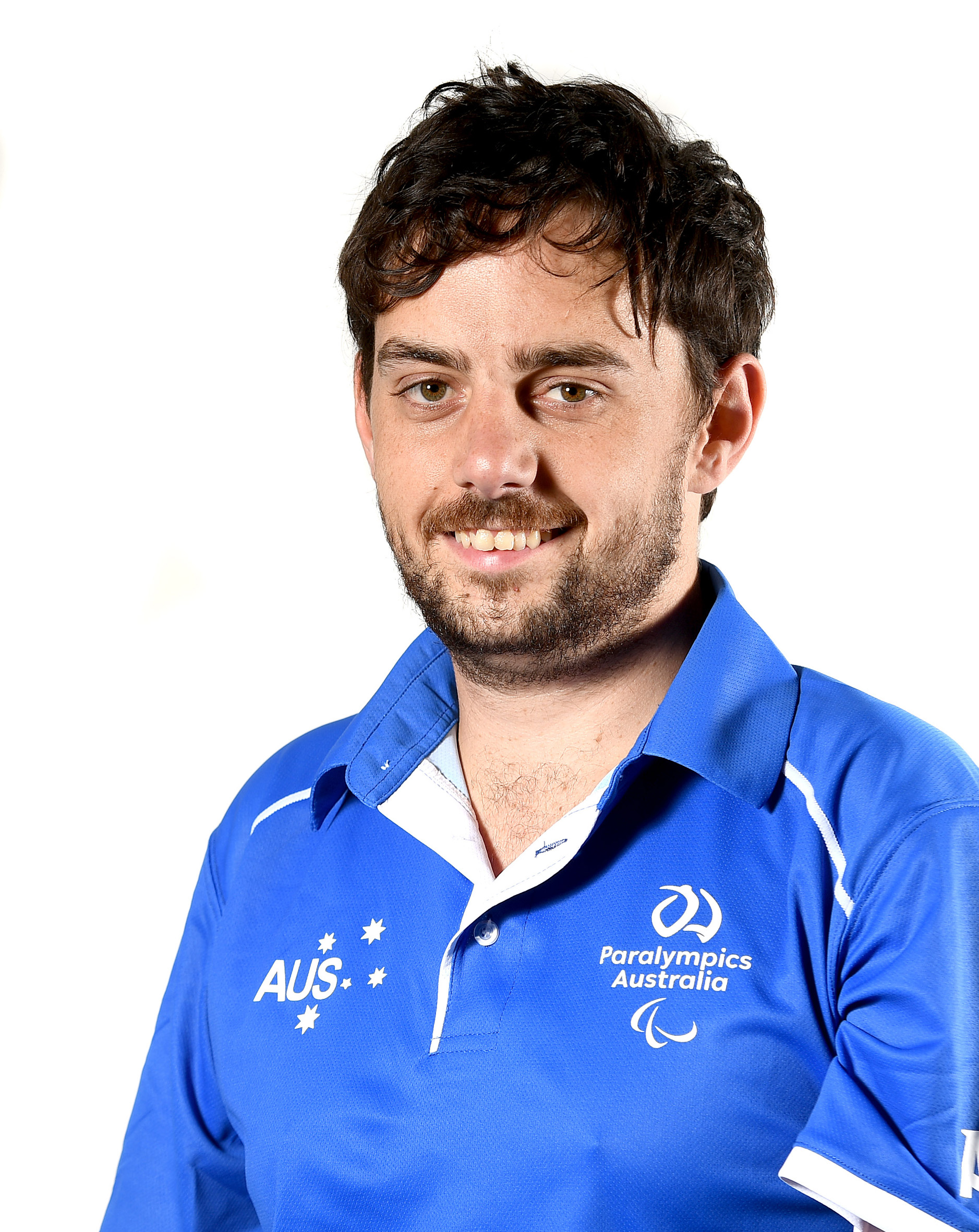
- Jake Ballestrino in 2019

Personal information
- Nickname: Jakey B
- Nationality: Australian
- Born: 27 July 1991 (age 35)

Sport
- Country: Australia
- Sport: Table Tennis
- Club: Geelong Table Tennis Association

Jake Ballestrino (born 27 July 1991) is an Australian Paralympic table tennis player. He represented Australia at the 2020 Tokyo Paralympics.

== Personal ==
Ballestrino was born on 27 July 1991. From birth he has an upper limb deficiency or a bilateral deformation of the upper limbs. He is a graphic artist, having completed an Advanced Diploma in Interactive Digital media. In 2021, he is a Community Educator at Scope Australia.

== Table tennis ==
He is classified as a C7 Para-table tennis player. He initially played as a right-handed but changed to left hand after breaking his arm. He took up Para-table tennis in 2012 and first represented Australia in 2013.

In 2017, he won the silver medal in the Men's Singles C6 class at the Oceania Championships.

At the 2020 Tokyo Paralympics, he lost three matches in the Men's C7 and with Trevor Hirth lost in the quarter-finals of Men's Team C6-7.

He has played for the Laverton Magpies Football Club and softball for the Pirates in Werribee where he also coaches and umpires.
