= Marion O'Brien =

Australian Paralympic table tennis player and athlete

Personal information
- Nationality: Australia
Medal record
Representing Australia
Athletics
Paralympic Games
| Silver medal – second place | 1964 Tokyo | Javelin C |
| Bronze medal – third place | 1968 Tel Aviv | Slalom C |
Table tennis
Paralympic Games
| Gold medal – first place | 1964 Tokyo | Doubles C |
| Bronze medal – third place | 1964 Tokyo | Singles C |
| Silver medal – second place | 1968 Tel Aviv | Doubles C |

Marion O'Brien is an Australian Paralympic table tennis player and athlete. At the 1964 Tokyo Games, she won a gold medal in the women's doubles C event with Daphne Ceeney, a silver medal in the women's javelin C event, and a bronze medal in the women's singles C event. At the 1968 Tel Aviv Games, she won a silver medal in the women's doubles C event with Elaine Schreiber, and a bronze medal in the women's slalom C event.
