= Alan McLucas =

Australian Paralympic competitor

Allan McLucas
Personal information
- Nationality: Australia
Medal record
Representing Australia
Archery
Paralympic Games
Silver medal – second place	1968 Tel Aviv	St. Nicholas cervical
Athletics
Paralympic Games
Gold medal – first place	1968 Tel Aviv	Slalom cervical
Table tennis
Paralympic Games
Bronze medal – third place	1964 Tokyo	Singles A2

Alan McLucas is an Australian Paralympian. At the 1964 Tokyo Games, he won a bronze medal in the table tennis men's singles A2 event. At the 1968 Tel Aviv Games, he won a gold medal in the men's slalom cervical class event and a silver medal in archery in the men's St. Nicholas round cervical event, and participated in table tennis. He also participated in swimming at both the 1964 and 1968 Paralympics.
