= Daphne Ceeney =

Australian Paralympic athlete (1934–2016)

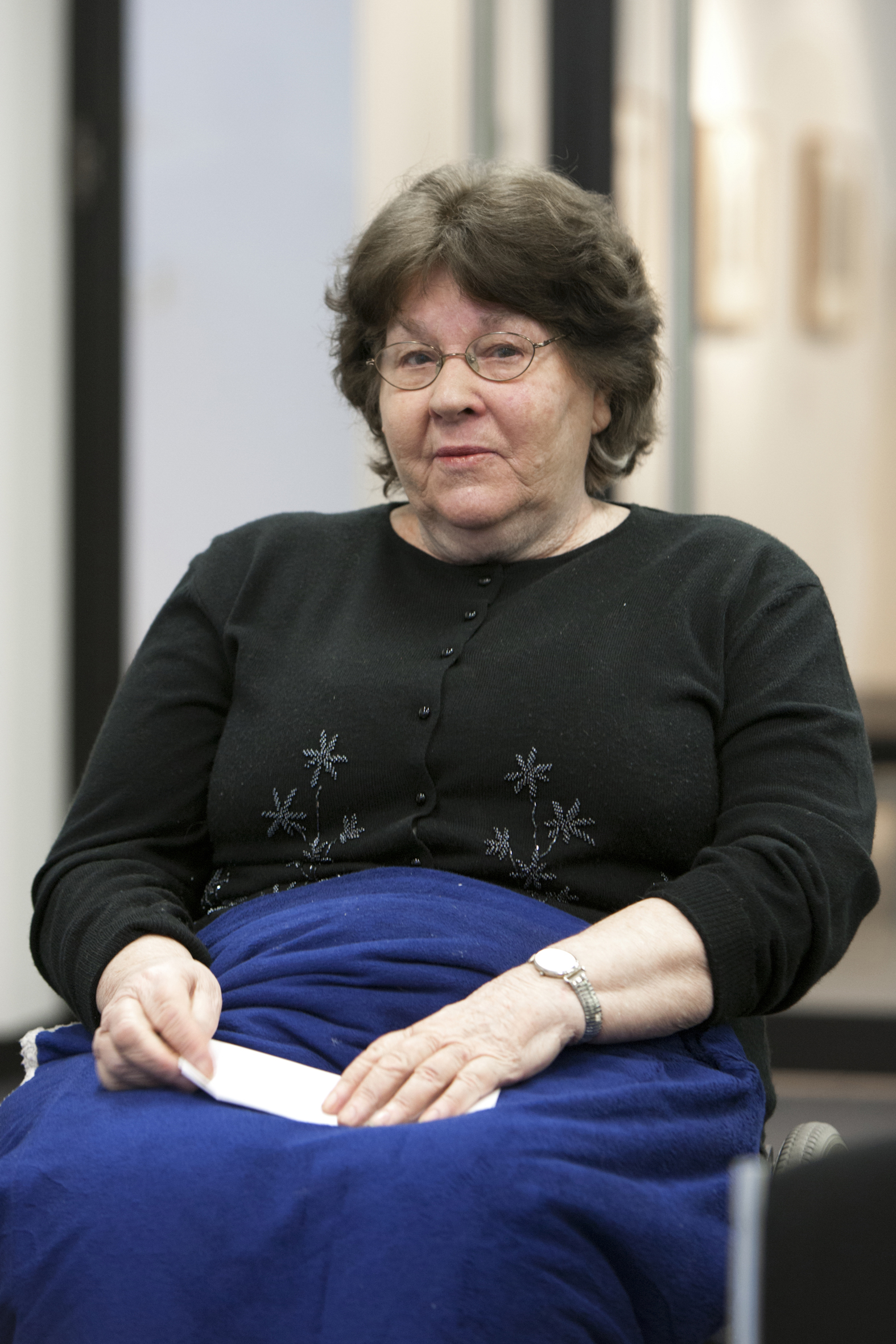
- Daphne Hilton (née Ceeney) in 2012

Personal information
- Full name: Daphne Jean Hilton
- Nationality: Australia
- Born: 7 January 1934
- Died: 25 July 2016 (aged 82)
Medal record
Swimming
Paralympic Games
Gold medal – first place	1960 Rome	Women's 50 m Breaststroke complete class 5
Gold medal – first place	1960 Rome	Women's 50 m Crawl complete class 5
Silver medal – second place	1964 Tokyo	Women's 50 m Freestyle Prone complete class 5
Bronze medal – third place	1964 Tokyo	Women's 50 m Freestyle Supine cauda equina
Silver medal – second place	1968 Tel Aviv	Women's 50 m Freestyle class 5 (cauda equina)
Athletics
Paralympic Games
Silver medal – second place	1960 Rome	Women's Club Throw Class C
Silver medal – second place	1960 Rome	Women's Javelin C
Bronze medal – third place	1960 Rome	Women's Shot Put C
Bronze medal – third place	1968 Tel Aviv	Women's 60 m Wheelchair C
Bronze medal – third place	1968 Tel Aviv	Women's Pentathlon special class
Archery
Paralympic Games
Silver medal – second place	1960 Rome	Women's St. Nicholas Round open
Bronze medal – third place	1964 Tokyo	Women's Albion Round open
Women's table tennis
Paralympic Games
Gold medal – first place	1964 Tokyo	Women's Doubles C
Women's fencing
Paralympic Games
Bronze medal – third place	1964 Tokyo	Women's Foil Individual

Daphne Jean Hilton (née Ceeney; 7 January 1934 – 25 July 2016) was an Australian Paralympic competitor. She was the first Australian woman to compete at the Paralympic Games. She won fourteen medals in three Paralympics in archery, athletics, fencing, swimming, and table tennis from 1960 to 1968.

== Personal ==
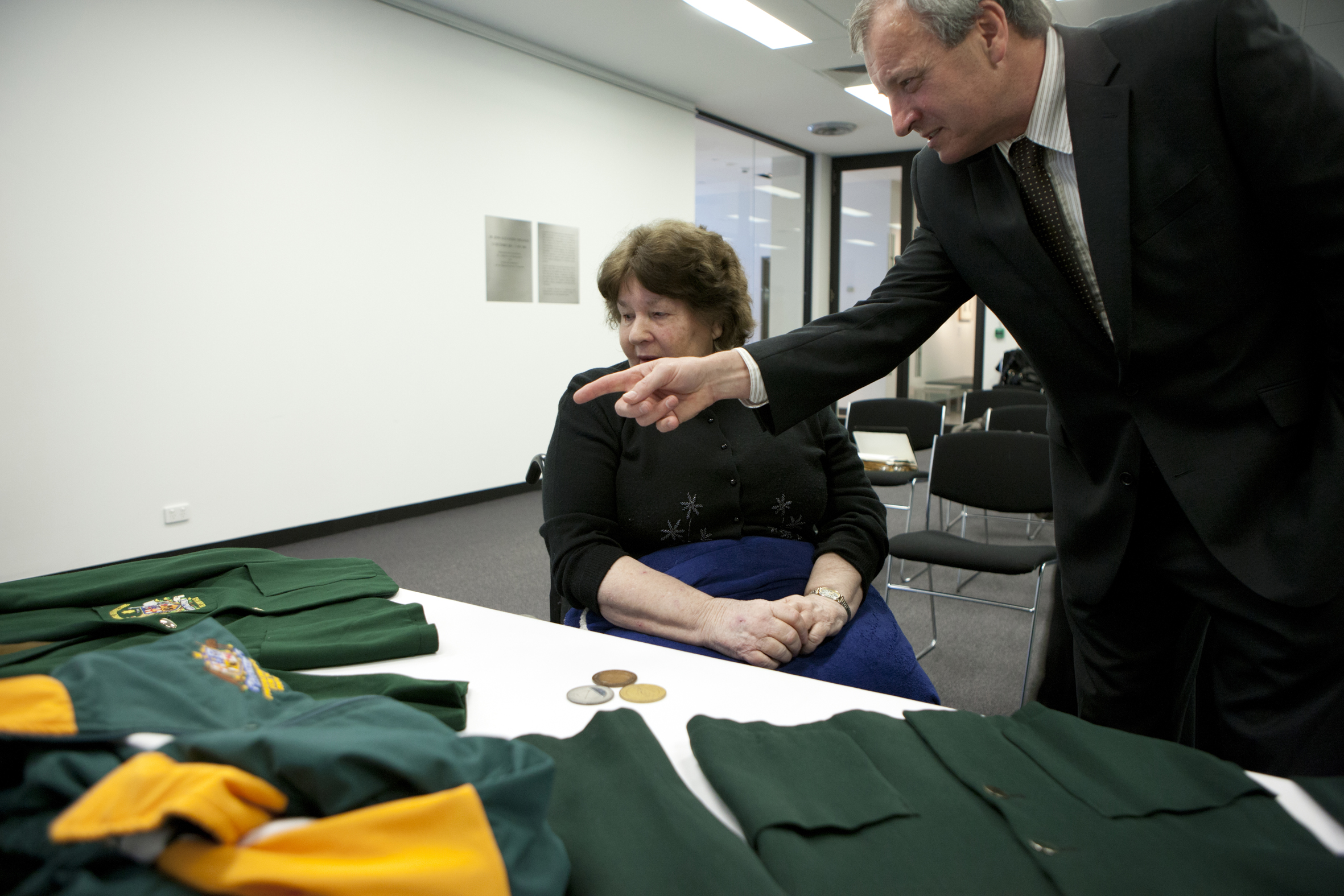
Australian Paralympic Committee President and Daphne Hilton (née Ceeney) view the blazers and medals Hilton donated to the APC in 2012

Ceeney was born in the New South Wales town of Harden-Murrumburrah on 7 January 1934, as the eldest of four children. She became a paraplegic after breaking her back in a horse-riding accident in 1951 at the age of 17. She spent 9 months in Sydney's Royal Prince Alfred Hospital before returning to Murrumburrah. Eight years after the accident, she moved to Sydney, where she spent six months at the Cherrywood Rehabilitation Centre and then one year at Mt Wilga Rehabilitation Hospital. While living at the rehabilitation hospital, she developed her sporting ability and skills. She was selected as Australia's only female athlete at the 1960 Rome Paralympics.

In 1967, she married Frank Hilton, whom she had met at the Northern Archers Club. She worked as a shorthand typist until the birth of her twin girls, Nichole and Rachael, in 1970. She was at the Royal North Shore Hospital for six months before the delivery, and was the first person with paraplegia to give birth to twins in Australia; a thesis was written about her pregnancy and birth. She officially opened the athlete's village at the 2000 Sydney Olympics and Paralympics, and was part of the 2000 Paralympic torch relay. In August 2012, she donated a set of medals from the 1960 Games and three Australian team blazers to the Australian Paralympic Committee. She died in Canberra on 25 July 2016 at the age of 82.

== Sporting career ==
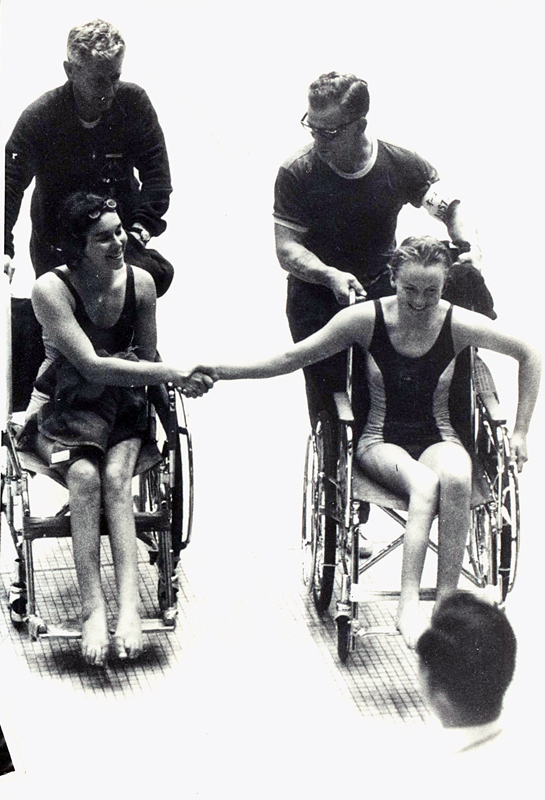
Australian Paralympic Team members Daphne Ceeney (now Hilton) and Elizabeth Edmondson shake hands after Edmondson won gold and Ceeney silver in the 50m prone swimming event at the 1964 Tokyo Paralympic Games. They are pushed by Kevin Betts (Ceeney) and 'Johnno' Johnston (Edmondson)

=== 1960 Summer Paralympics ===
Ceeney was the only Australian female competitor at the inaugural 1960 Rome Games. At the games, she won two gold medals in the Women's 50 m Breaststroke complete class 5 and Women's 50 m Crawl complete class 5 events, three silver medals in the Women's St. Nicholas Round open in archery, Women's Club Throw C, and Women's Javelin C events, and a bronze medal in the Women's Shot Put C event.

=== 1962 Commonwealth Paraplegic Games ===
She won 8 gold medals and one silver medal at the 1962 Commonwealth Paraplegic Games in Perth, Western Australia, specifically in athletics, archery and swimming.

=== 1964 Summer Paralympics ===
At the 1964 Tokyo Games, she won a gold medal in the Women's Doubles C table tennis event with Marion O'Brien, a silver medal in the Women's 50 m Freestyle Prone complete class 5 event, and three bronze medals in the Women's Albion Round open in archery, Women's 50 m Freestyle Supine cauda equina, and the Women's Foil Individual (wheelchair fencing) events; she also competed but did not win any medals in athletics events at the 1964 games.

=== 1966 Commonwealth Paraplegic Games ===
Ceeney won 13 medals including 6 gold medals in swimming fencing, shot put, table tennis and pentathlon at the 1966 Commonwealth Paraplegic Games in Jamaica. At these games, she was the only female member of Australia's wheelchair basketball team. These Games were where she added wheelchair basketball to her repertoire becoming to first female wheelchair basketballer to play in men's competition in Australia.

=== 1968 Summer Paralympics ===
At the 1968 Tel Aviv Games, she won a silver medal in the Women's 50 m Freestyle class 5 (cauda equina) event and two bronze medals in the Women's 60 m Wheelchair C and Women's Pentathlon special class events. She retired from Paralympic competition in 1968. Hilton retired from Paralympic sport with a total of 14 medals which was a record not passed by any Australian Paralympic athlete until 2000.

=== 2002 World Wheelchair Games ===
In the 1990s, Ceeney came out of retirement and took up lawn bowls in the hope of gaining selection for the 2000 Sydney Paralympics. The sport was taken off the program after the 1996 Atlanta Paralympics but Ceeney went on to compete at the 2002 World Wheelchair Games winning a silver in the singles and bronze medal in the pairs and this took place 42 years after her first international sporting success. She retired from lawn bowls in that year.

== Recognition ==
In 2012, Hilton was one of 31 individuals invited to be an ambassador for the 50 year celebrations of Wheelchair Sports NSW. Hilton was inducted into the New South Wales Hall of Champions in November 2014. In December 2016, she was posthumously inducted into the Australian Paralympic Hall of Fame. A tunnel boring machine used in New South Wales is named after her.
