= List of medal sweeps in Paralympic Games =

The following is a list of medal sweeps in the Paralympic Games. A medal sweep, also known as a podium sweep, is when one team wins all available medals in a single event. It is a rare occurrence that most often happens in athletics, cycling, and swimming. Since the Paralympic Games started in 1960, there have been 79 podium sweeps (as of the 2020 Summer Paralympics).

== Archery ==
There has been one occasion where there has been a podium sweep in archery.

Paralympiad	Event	Country	Gold	Silver	Bronze
2012; London	Men's recurve standing	Russia (RUS)	Timur Tuchinov	Oleg Shestakov	Mikhail Oyun
2016; Rio de Janeiro	Women's individual compound W1	Great Britain (GBR)	Jessica Stretton	Jo Frith	Vicky Jenkins

== Athletics ==
There are 26 podium sweeps in track and field athletics in the Paralympic Games.

Paralympiad	Event	Country	Gold	Silver	Bronze
1960; Rome	Women's shot put A	Italy (ITA)	Maria Scutti 4.18 m	Anna Maria Galimberti 3.70 m	Anna Maria Toso 3.17 m
1964; Tokyo	Men's wheelchair dash below T10	United States (USA)	Ron Stein	Tim Harris	Richard Miller
1968; Tel Aviv	Men's slalom C	Japan (JPN)	Hisashi Furukawa 1:01.50	Mikio Egawa 1:03.20	Teruyoshi Tsuchiya 1:04.40
1968; Tel Aviv	60 m wheelchair A	United States (USA)	Carol Geisse	Kirn	Cornett
1968; Tel Aviv	Women's club throw D	Israel (ISR)	Zipora Rubin-Rosenbaum 27.44 m	Batia Mishani 23.93 m	Shoshana Sharabi 21.06 m
1976; Toronto	Men's discus throw C	West Germany (FRG)	Hans Josefiak 37.13 m	Dieter Belz 35.99 m	E. Kuehnel 35.13 m
1976; Toronto	Men's discus throw D1	United States (USA)	John Jerome 27.16 m	J. Behan 24.61 m	Curt Brinkman 24.42 m
1976; Toronto	Men's shot put C	West Germany (FRG)	John Jerome	J. Behan	M. Johnson
1976; Toronto	Men's javelin throw D1 C	United States (USA)	Dieter Belz 13.39 m	E. Kuehnel 13.22 m	Hans Josefiak 12.90 m
1976; Toronto	Women's pentathlon A	Canada (CAN)	J. Pacquette 3786pts	B. Stanger 3274pts	T. Stevenson 3208pts
1980; Arnhem	Men's 400m D1 wheelchairs	United States (USA)	Curt Brinkman 1:13.05	Jim Martinson 1:13.61	J. Finch 1:19.89
1980; Arnhem	Women's 60m A	United States (USA)	Carmella Lovitt 9.08 s	Lou Keller 9.20 s	Melissa Ricketts 9.23 s
1984; Stoke Mandeville/New York	Men's 100m C5	United States (USA)	John Sacco 22.96 s	Dean Houle 23.66 s	Mark Kemp 25.92 s
1984; Stoke Mandeville/New York	Women's club throw C3	Great Britain (GBR)	Aileen Harper 12.38 m	Anne Trotman 12.04 m	Linda Fyfe 9.55 m
1988; Seoul	Men's 200m C4-5	Canada (CAN)	Robert Easton 37.98 s	Gino Vendetti 38.61 s	Michael Johner 40.33 s
1988; Seoul	Men's 400m 1A	Germany (GER)	Gunther Obert	Hans Lubbering	Heinrich Koeberle
1988; Seoul	Men's 800m 1A	West Germany (FRG)	Gunther Obert 3:01.09	Hans Lubbering 3:01.39	Heinrich Koeberle 3:08.88
1988; Seoul	Men's 5000m 1A	West Germany (FRG)	Heinrich Koeberle 19:23.38	Hans Lubbering 21:15.52	Gunther Obert 22:13.63
1988; Seoul	Men's slalom 3	Japan (JPN)	Seiji Hayashi 1:54.20	Takao Ishii 1:56.20	Takeshi Iwasaki 2:00.20
1988; Seoul	Men's Distance throw C1	South Korea (KOR)	Keung Ho Ku	Keung Ho Lee	Ji Hwan Yun
1992; Barcelona	Men's 200m C3-4	United States (USA)	David Larson 31.60 s	Ross Davis 32.28 s	Christopher Ridgway 34.70 s
1992; Barcelona	Men's 400m C3-4	United States (USA)	David Larson 58.22 s	Ross Davis 59.54 s	Christopher Ridgway 1:01.80
1992; Barcelona	Men's 800m C3-4	United States (USA)	David Larson 1:55.90	Ross Davis 1:55.98	Christopher Ridgway 2:06.19
1996; Atlanta	Women's long jump F10-11	Spain (ESP)	Magdalena Amo 5.22 m	Rosalia Lazaro 5.22 m	Purificacion Ortiz 5.07 m
1996; Atlanta	Men's 800 m T11	Spain (ESP)	José Antonio Sánchez	José Saura	Ruben Delgado
2000; Sydney	Men's javelin throw F58	Egypt (EGY)	Mahmoud Elatar 49.92 m	El Sayed Moussa 41.41 m	Hany Elbehiry 40.56 m
2000; Sydney	Women's 200 meters T38	Australia (AUS)	Lisa McIntosh 28.54 s	Alison Quinn 29.31 s	Katrina Webb 29.84 s
2008; Beijing	Women's discus throw F42-46	China (CHN)	Wang Jun 36.99 m F42 WR	Yang Yue 42.38 m F44 WR	Zheng Baozhu 33.19 m F42
2012; London	Women's 100 meters T11	Brazil (BRA)	Terezinha Guilhermina 12.01 s WR	Jerusa Geber 12.75 s	Jhulia Santos 12.76 s
2012; London	Men's shot put F32-33	Algeria (ALG)	Kamel Kardjena 12.14 m	Karim Betina 10.37 m	Mounir Bakiri 9.49 m
2016; Rio	Women's 1500 meters T54	United States (USA)	Tatyana McFadden 3:22.50	Jerusa Geber 3:22.61	Jhulia Santos 3:22.67
2016; Rio	Women's 5000 meters T54	United States (USA)	Tatyana McFadden 11:54.07	Chelsea McClammer 11:54.33	Amanda McGrory 11:54.34
2020; Tokyo	Women's 100 metres T63	Italy (ITA)	Ambra Sabatini 14.11 s WR	Martina Caironi 14.46 s	Monica Contrafatto 14.73 s
2024 Paris	Women's 100 metres T64	Netherlands (NED)	Fleur Jong 12.64 s	Kimberly Alkemade 12.70 s	Marlene van Gansewinkel 12.72 s

== Cycling ==
Paralympiad	Event	Country	Gold	Silver	Bronze
1988; Seoul	Men's bicycle 1500 m C5–6	South Korea (KOR)	Do Geol Kwak	Jong Kil Kim	Jung Yeol Lee
1988; Seoul	Men's bicycle 3000 m C5–6/8	South Korea (KOR)	Jong Kil Kim	Do Geol Kwak	Jung Yeol Lee
2004; Athens	Men's bicycle 1500 m C5–6	China (CHN)	Zhou Ju Fang 1:15.49 WR	An Feng Zhen 1:17.71	Tang Qi 1:18.39 WR

== Lawn bowls ==
Paralympiad	Event	Country	Gold	Silver	Bronze
1984; Stoke Mandeville/New York	Men's singles tetraplegic	Great Britain (GBR)	K. Ellison	Isabel Barr	Tommy Taylor
1996; Atlanta	Men's singles LB7/8	Great Britain (GBR)	Alan Lyne	George Wright	Keith Brenton

== Paratriathlon ==
Paralympiad	Event	Country	Gold	Silver	Bronze
2016; Rio	Women's PT2	United States (USA)	Allysa Seely	Hailey Danisewicz	Melissa Stockwell

== Snooker ==
Paralympiad	Event	Country	Gold	Silver	Bronze
1984; Stoke Mandeville/New York	Men tetraplegic	Great Britain (GBR)	P. Haslam	K. Ellison	Tommy Taylor

== Swimming ==
Paralympiad	Event	Country	Gold	Silver	Bronze
1960; Rome	Men's 25m crawl incomplete class 2	Italy (ITA)	Renzo Rogo 25.60 s	Grimaldi 30.20 s	Ottavio Moscone 30.40 s
1960; Rome	Men's 25m breaststroke incomplete class 2	Italy (ITA)	Renzo Rogo 35.90 s	Grimaldi 36.00 s	Ottavio Moscone 36.70 s
1960; Rome	Women's 25m backstroke juniors incomplete class 4	Norway (NOR)	Reklev 28.10 s	Myrheim 29.40 s	Vagrum 30.70 s
1964; Tokyo	Women's 50m breaststroke special class	Argentina (ARG)	Silvia Cochetti 1:08.10	Estela Falocco 1:36.00	Amelia Mier 2:07.90
1964; Tokyo	Women's 50m freestyle prone special class	Argentina (ARG)	Silvia Cochetti 46.70 s	Estela Falocco 1:04.40	Amelia Mier 1:05.40
1964; Tokyo	Women's 50m freestyle supine special class	Argentina (ARG)	Silvia Cochetti 1:05.70	Estela Falocco 1:17.90	Amelia Mier 1:20.20
1976; Toronto	Women's 100m backstroke 5	Netherlands (NED)	Marijke Ruiter 1:21.76	Riekie Adelerhof 1:33.53	Jeanne Backx-de Backer 1:36.35
1980; Arnhem	Men's 100m backstroke E	Netherlands (NED)	M. Kers 1:18.94	Andre van Buiten 1:19.74	B. Koopman 1:24.51
1980; Arnhem	Women's 100m backstroke B	United States (USA)	Trischa Zorn 1:11.80	Marie van Liere 1:18.87	Missy Akins 1:21.30
1980; Arnhem	Women's 4x50m individual medley B	United States (USA)	Trischa Zorn	Missy Akins	Marie van Liere
1984; Stoke Mandeville/New York	Women's 50m breaststroke B3	United States (USA)	Marie van Liere 43.46 s	Tonia McHugh 45.00 s	Kristy Satterfield 54.68 s
1984; Stoke Mandeville/New York	Women's 100m backstroke B3	United States (USA)	Barbara Eiler 1:20.15	Cathy Schmitt 1:20.97	Marie van Liere 1:22.60
1984; Stoke Mandeville/New York	Women's 400m breaststroke B3	United States (USA)	Cathy Schmitt 6:55.13	Lori Johnson 7:06.28	Marie van Liere 7:19.34
1992 Summer Paralympics	Men's 50m freestyle S2	Great Britain (GBR)	Peter Hull 1:09.28	James Anderson 1:20.44	Alan McGregor 1:25.71
1992 Summer Paralympics	Men's 100m freestyle S2	Great Britain (GBR)	Peter Hull 2:26.30	James Anderson 2:56.56	Alan McGregor 3:02.93
1992 Summer Paralympics	Women's 400m freestyle B2–3	United States (USA)	Elizabeth Scott	Trischa Zorn	Heidi Schetter
1992 Summer Paralympics	Women's 100m breaststroke SB6-7	Germany (GER)	Britta Siegers 1:44.47	Heidi Kopp 1:49.82	Beate Schretzmann 1:50.55
2008 Summer Paralympics	Women's 100 metre butterfly S13	Canada (CAN)	Valerie Grand Maison 1:06.49	Kirby Cote 1:06.62	Chelsey Gotell 1:06.93
2008 Summer Paralympics	Women's 200 metre individual medley SM13	Canada (CAN)	Chelsey Gotell 1:13.46	Kirby Cote 1:13.71	Valerie Grand Maison 1:16.98
2016 Summer Paralympics	Men's 50 metre breaststroke SB2	China (CHN)	Wenpan Huang 50.65 s WR	Tingshen Li 51.78 s	Chaowen Huang 54.29 s
2016 Summer Paralympics	Men's 50 metre butterfly S6	China (CHN)	Qing Xu 29.89 s WR	Zheng Tao 29.93 s	Lichao Wang 30.95 s
2016 Summer Paralympics	Men's 100 metre butterfly S8	China (CHN)	Maodang Song 59.19 s WR	Haijiao Xu 1:00.08	Guanglong Yang 1:01.18
2016 Summer Paralympics	Men's 200 metre individual medley SM10	Ukraine (UKR)	Denys Dubrov 2:06.87 WR	Maksym Krypak 2:08.10	Dmytro Vanzenko 2:10.48
2020 Summer Paralympics	Men's 50 metre butterfly S5	China (CHN)	Zheng Tao 30.62 s WR	Wang Lichao 31.81 s	Yuan Weiyi 32.00 s
2020 Summer Paralympics	Men's 50 metre backstroke S5	China (CHN)	Zheng Tao 31.42 s WR	Ruan Jingsong 32.97 s	Wang Lichao 33.38 s
2020 Summer Paralympics	Men's 50 metre freestyle S5	China (CHN)	Zheng Tao 30.31 s PR	Yuan Weiyi 31.11 s	Wang Lichao 31.35 s
2020 Summer Paralympics	Women's 100m backstroke S11	China (CHN)	Cai Liwen 1:13.46 WR	Wang Xinyi 1:13.71	Li Guizhi 1:16.98
2024 Summer Paralympics	Men's 50 metre backstroke S5	China (CHN)	Yuan Weiyi 32.47 s	Guo Jincheng 33.02 s	Wang Lichao 33.06 s
2024 Summer Paralympics	Women's 50 metre backstroke S5	China (CHN)	Lu Dong 37.51 s	He Shenggao 39.93 s	Liu Yu 42.37 s
2024 Summer Paralympics	Men's 50 metre freestyle S5	China (CHN)	Guo Jincheng 29.33 s WR	Yuan Weiyi 30.80 s	Wang Lichao 31.23 s
2024 Summer Paralympics	Men's 50 metre butterfly S5	China (CHN)	Guo Jincheng 30.28 s WR	Yuan Weiyi 30.71 s	Wang Lichao 30.89 s
2024 Summer Paralympics	Women's 200 metre individual medley SM5	China (CHN)	He Shenggao 3:17.99	Lu Dong 3:18.47	Cheng Jiao 3:26.33

== Table tennis ==
Paralympiad	Event	Country	Gold	Silver	Bronze
1988; Seoul	Men's single TT3	West Germany (FRG)	Thomas Kurfess	Rainer Schmidt	Stephan Welting

== Wheelchair tennis ==
Paralympiad	Event	Country	Gold	Silver	Bronze
1996; Atlanta	Women's single TT3	Netherlands (NED)	Maaike Smit	Monique Kalkman-Van Den Bosch	Chantal Vandierendonck
2000; Sydney	Women's single	Netherlands (NED)	Esther Vergeer	Sharon Walraven	Maaike Smit
2012; London	Women's single	Netherlands (NED)	Esther Vergeer	Aniek van Koot	Jiske Griffioen

== Wheelchair fencing ==
Paralympiad	Event	Country	Gold	Silver	Bronze
1960; Rome	Men's sabre individual	Italy (ITA)	Aurelio Tedone	Franco Rossi	Giovanni Ferraris
1960; Rome	Men's sabre team	Italy (ITA)	Giovanni Ferraris; Aurelio Tedone	Ottavio Moscone; Aroldo Ruschioni	Giovanni Berghella; Franco Rossi
1960; Rome	Women's foil individual	Italy (ITA)	Anna Maria Toso	Maria Scutti	Anna Maria Galimberti
1968; Tel Aviv	Men's foil individual	Italy (ITA)	Roberto Marson	Vittorio Loi	Giuliano Koten
1992; Barcelona	Men's foil 3-4	France (FRA)	Arthur Bellance	Yvon Pacault	Robert Citerne
1996; Atlanta	Women's foil individual A	France (FRA)	Josette Bourgain	Sophie Belgodere-Paralitici	Patricia Picot

== Recap ==
Country	Number of podium sweeps
United States	19
China	9
Italy	8
Great Britain	7
West Germany	6
Netherlands	5
Canada	4
South Korea	3
Argentina	3
France	2
Spain	2
Japan	2
Israel	1
Germany	1
Egypt	1
Australia	1
Russia	1
Brazil	1
Algeria	1
Ukraine	1
Norway	1

== See also ==
- List of Paralympic records in athletics
- List of Paralympic records in cycling
- List of Paralympic records in swimming
