= Wheelchair fencing at the 1972 Summer Paralympics =

Wheelchair fencing at the IV Paralympic Games
- Paralympic Wheelchair fencing pictogram

Wheelchair fencing at the 1972 Summer Paralympics consisted of eleven events, eight for men and three for women.

== Medal summary ==
Event	Gold	Silver	Bronze
Men's épée individual	Roberto Marson; Italy	Pierre Prestat; France	Cyril Thomas; Great Britain
Men's épée team	Italy (ITA); Roberto Marson; Franco Rossi; Germano Zanarotto	France (FRA); Michel Foucre; Pierre Prestat; Herbert Sok	Great Britain (GBR); J. Clarke; Cyril Thomas; Terry Willett
Men's foil novice individual	Vittorio Paradiso; Italy	Huebenthal; West Germany	Dieter Leicht; West Germany
Men's foil individual	Vittorio Loi; Italy	Franco Rossi; Italy	Willi Schneider; West Germany
Men's foil novice team	West Germany (FRG); Huebenthal; Dieter Leicht; Maul	Italy (ITA); Jaculano; Marras; Vittorio Paradiso	None
Men's foil team	Italy (ITA); Giuliano Koten; Vittorio Loi; Franco Rossi; Germano Zanarotto	France (FRA); Jacques Ceretto; Roger Schuh; Herbert Sok	West Germany (FRG); Hans-Joachim Bohm; Huebenthal; Juhlke; Willi Schneider
Men's sabre individual	Roberto Marson; Italy	Ron Parkin; Great Britain	Pierre Prestat; France
Men's sabre team	Great Britain (GBR); Ron Parkin; Cyril Thomas; Terry Willett	Italy (ITA); Giovanni Ferraris; Roberto Marson; Germano Pecchenino; Oliver Venturi	France (FRA); Michel Foucre; Pierre Prestat; Roger Schuh
Women's foil novice individual	Carol Bryant; Great Britain	Lenzko; West Germany	Géraldine Pissonier; France
Women's foil individual	Josette Merckx; France	Shoshana Sharabi; Israel	Rachel Tassa; Israel
Women's foil team	Israel (ISR); Ayala Malchan; Margalit Peretz; Shoshana Sharabi; Rachel Tassa	France (FRA); Madeleine Foure; Josette Merckx; Géraldine Pissonier	Great Britain (GBR); Haynes; J. Swann; P. Waller
