= Italy at the Summer Paralympics =

Italian delegation to sporting event

- IPC code: ITA
- NPC: Comitato Italiano Paralimpico
- Website: Official website
- Medals Ranked 12th: Gold 191 Silver 217 Bronze 262 Total 670

Summer Paralympics appearances (overview)
- 1960; 1964; 1968; 1972; 1976; 1980; 1984; 1988; 1992; 1996; 2000; 2004; 2008; 2012; 2016; 2020; 2024

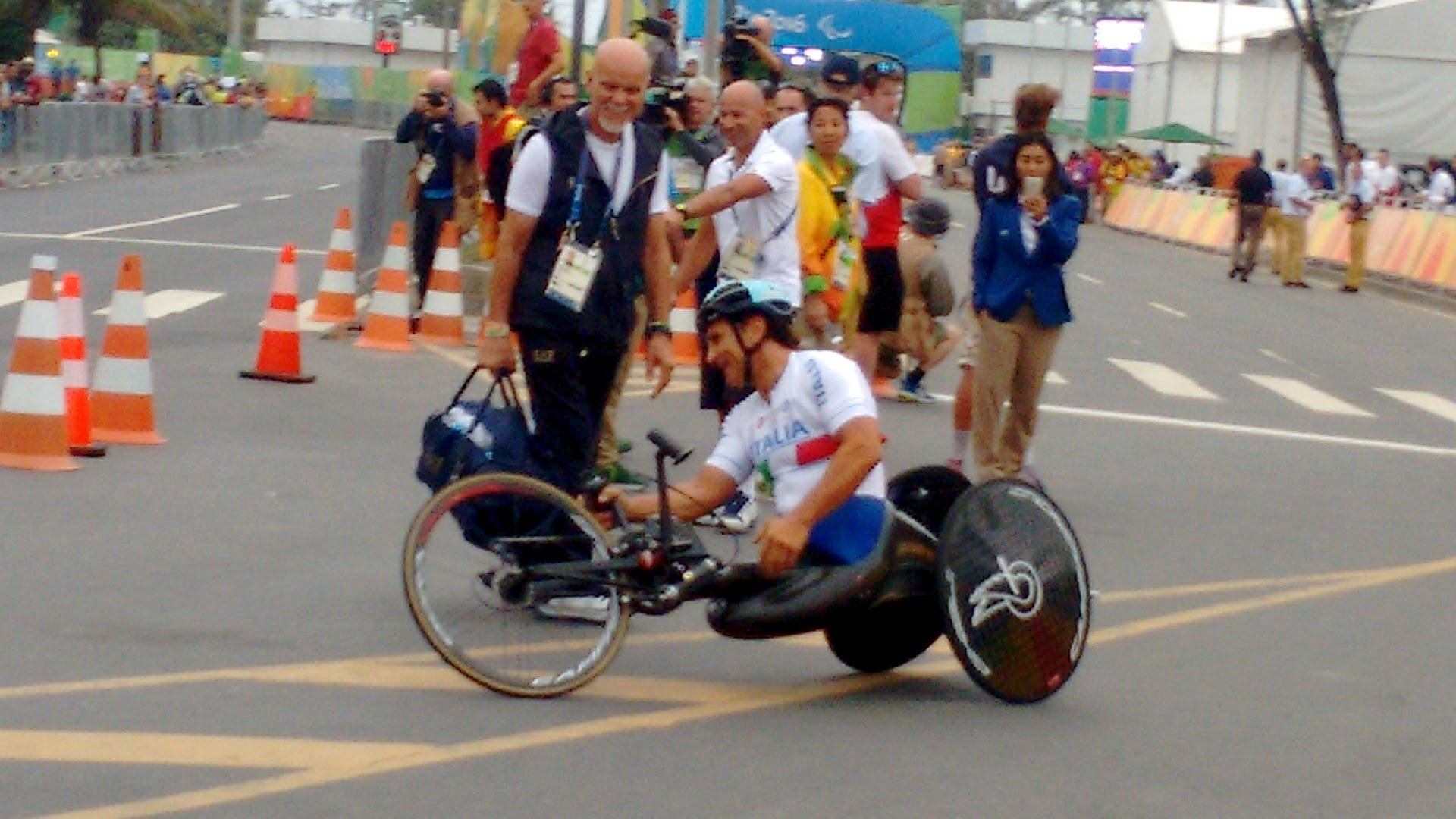
Alex Zanardi, six medals won at the Summer Paralympics.

Italy has sent delegations to the Summer Paralympics since the first edition in Rome 1960, the International Paralympic Committee (IPC).

== Medal tables ==
*Red border color indicates tournament was held on home soil.

Games	Athletes	Gold	Silver	Bronze	Total	Rank
(Italy) 1960 Rome	65	29	28	23	80	1
(Japan) 1964 Tokyo	19	14	15	16	45	3
(Israel) 1968 Tel-Aviv	38	12	10	17	39	7
(Germany) 1972 Heidelberg	25	8	4	5	17	9
(Canada) 1976 Toronto	24	2	5	11	18	25
(Netherlands) 1980 Arnhem	38	6	5	9	20	20
(United Kingdom) (United States) 1984 Stoke Mandeville/New York	61	9	19	14	42	21
(South Korea) 1988 Seoul	96	16	15	27	58	16
(Spain) 1992 Barcelona	88	10	7	18	35	17
(United States) 1996 Atlanta	69	11	20	14	45	14
(Australia) 2000 Sydney	63	9	8	10	27	18
(Greece) 2004 Athens	77	4	8	7	19	31
(China) 2008 Beijing	86	4	7	7	18	28
(United Kingdom) 2012 London	98	9	8	11	28	13
(Brazil) 2016 Rio de Janeiro	101	10	14	15	39	9
(Japan) 2020 Tokyo	115	14	29	26	69	9
(France) 2024 Paris	141	24	15	32	71	6
Total		191	217	262	670	13

== Multiple medallists ==
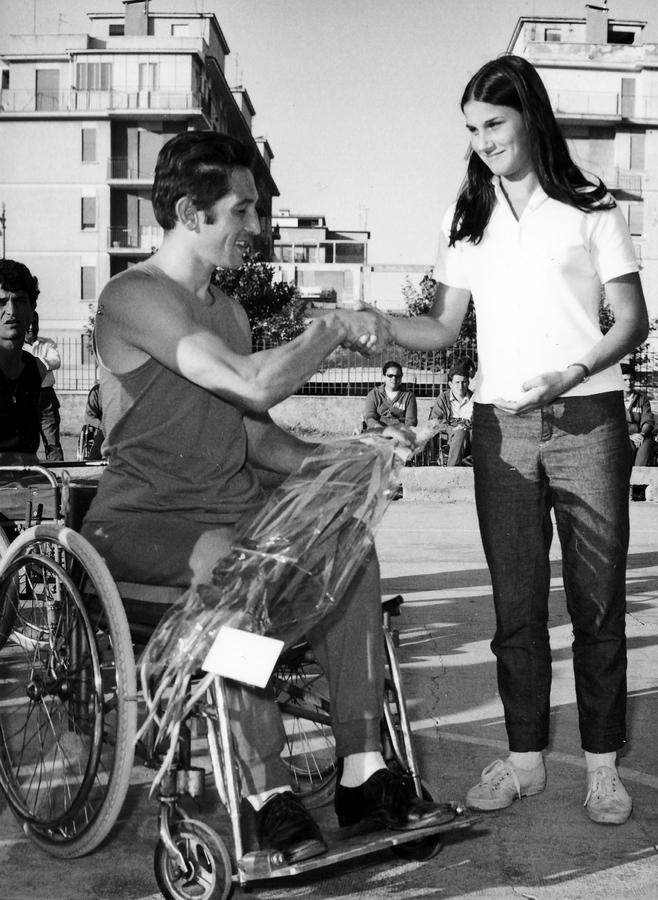
Roberto Marson 26 medals at the Summer Paralympics.

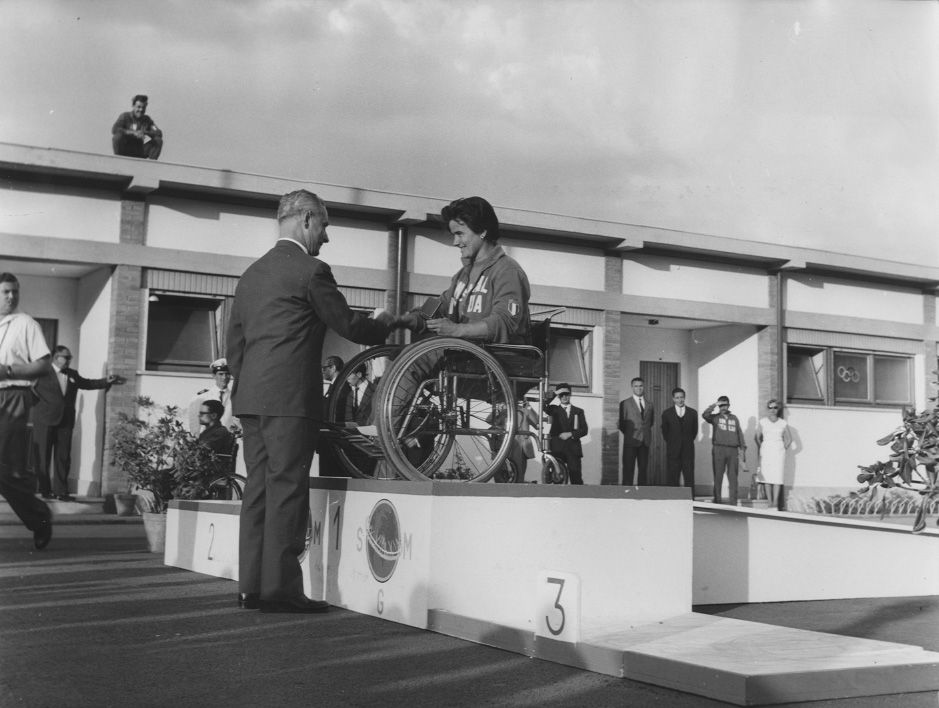
Maria Scutti on podium at the 1960 Summer Paralympics.

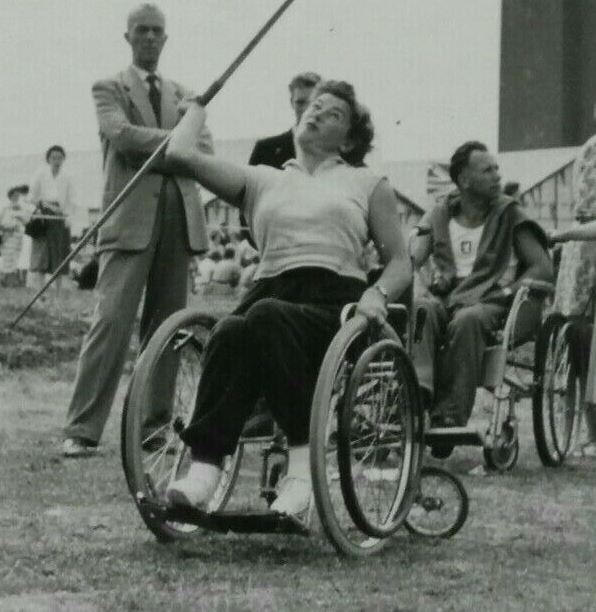
Anna Maria Toso 20 medals in two edition (1960 and 1964) of the Summer Paralympics.

These are official report of International Paralympic Committee.

Still active

Updated to Tokyo 2021.

#	Athlete	Years	1st place, gold medalist(s)	2nd place, silver medalist(s)	3rd place, bronze medalist(s)	Total
1	Roberto Marson	1964-1976	16	7	3	26
2	Maria Scutti	1960	10	3	2	15
3	Anna Maria Toso	1960-1964	8	10	2	20
4	Luca Pancalli	1984-1996	8	6	1	15
5	Alvise De Vidi	1988-2016	7	3	5	15
6	Franco Rossi	1960-1972	6	3	4	13
7	Paola Fantato	1988-2004	5	1	2	8
7	Santo Mangano	1984-1996	5	1	2	8
9	Renzo Rogo	1960-1964	5	0	2	7
10	Giovanni Ferraris	1960-1976	4	4	5	13
11	Alex Zanardi	2012-2016	4	2	0	6
12	Mariella Bertini	1984-1996	3	5	0	8
12	Luca Mazzone	2000-2020	3	5	0	8
14	Vittorio Loi	1968-1980	3	4	3	10
15	Aldo Manganaro	1988-2000	3	2	4	9
16	Irene Monaco	1964-1984	3	1	6	10
17	Germano Zanarotto	1968-1972	3	1	0	4
18	Sabrina Bulleri	1984-1988	3	0	3	6
19	Enzo Santini	1960	3	0	0	3
20	Francesca Porcellato (Note: She also won a gold medal at the Winter Paralympics)	1988-2020	2	4	7	13
21	Cecilia Camellini	2008-2016	2	3	2	7
22	Martina Caironi	2012-2020	2	3	0	5
23	Carlo Jannucci	1960-1976	2	2	3	7
24	Laura Presutto	1988-1996	2	2	2	6
24	Vittorio Podestà	2008-2016	2	2	2	6
26	Gianluca Saini	1988-1992	2	2	1	5
26	Carlotta Gilli	2020	2	2	1	5
26	Giulia Terzi	2020	2	2	1	5
29	Lina Franzese	1976-1980	2	2	0	4
29	Sandra Truccolo	1996-2004	2	2	0	4
29	Arjola Trimi	2020	2	2	0	4
29	Assunta Legnante	2012-2020	2	2	0	4
32	Federico Zarilli	1960-1968	2	1	3	6
32	Claudio Costa	1988-2000	2	1	3	6
35	Paolo D'Agostini	1980-2000	2	1	1	4
35	Bebe Vio	2016-2020	2	1	1	4
37	Giulio Martelli	1980-1984	2	1	0	3
37	Francesco Bocciardo	2020	2	1	0	3
39	Rosa Sicari	1972-1980	2	0	7	9
40	Oscar De Pellegrin	1992-2012	2	0	4	6
41	Patrizia Spadaccini	1996	2	0	0	2
42	Stefano Raimondi	2020	1	4	2	7
43	Elena Monaco	1964-1968	1	3	2	6
44	Antonio Fantin	2020	1	3	1	5
45	Simone Barlaam	2020	1	2	1	4
46	Milena Balsamo	1984-1988	1	1	3	5
47	Xenia Palazzo	2020	1	1	2	4
48	Gabriella Boreggio	1980	1	1	1	3
48	Rossana Giarrizzo	1988-1992	1	1	1	3
50	Immacolata Cerasuolo	2004	1	1	0	2

== See also ==
- Italy at the Summer Olympics
- Italy at the Winter Paralympics
