= Italy at the 1972 Summer Paralympics =

- IPC code: ITA
- NPC: Comitato Italiano Paralimpico
- Website: www.comitatoparalimpico.it (in Italian)

in Heidelberg
- Competitors: 25 (20 men, 5 women)
- Medals Ranked 9th: Gold 8 Silver 4 Bronze 15 Total 27

Summer Paralympics appearances (overview)
- 1960; 1964; 1968; 1972; 1976; 1980; 1984; 1988; 1992; 1996; 2000; 2004; 2008; 2012; 2016; 2020; 2024

Italy sent a delegation to compete at the 1972 Summer Paralympics in Heidelberg, West Germany. They sent twenty five competitors, twenty male and five female.

== Medalists ==
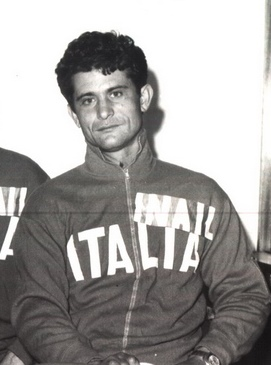
Vittorio Loi, two medals won at this edition of the Games.

Athlete	Sport	Event
GOLD
Giuseppe Trieste	Athletics	Men's Slalom 2
Roberto Marson	Wheelchair fencing	Men's individual epee
Roberto Marson	Wheelchair fencing	Men's individual saber
Vittorio Loi	Wheelchair fencing	Men's individual foil
Vittorio Paradiso	Wheelchair fencing	Male novel individual foil
Roberto Marson; Franco Rossi; Germano Zanarotto	Wheelchair fencing	Men's team epee
Giuliano Koten; Vittorio Loi; Franco Rossi; Germano Zanarotto	Wheelchair fencing	Men's team foil
Rosa Sicari	Table tennis	Individual 1B female
SILVER
Franco Rossi	Wheelchair fencing	Men's individual foil
Vittorio Paradiso; Jaculano; Marras	Wheelchair fencing	Men's junior team foil
Giovanni Ferraris; Roberto Marson; Germano Pecchenino; Oliver Venturi	Wheelchair fencing	Men's team saber
Giovanni Ferraris; Oliver Venturi	Table tennis	Team 3 male
BRONZE
Carlo Jannucci	Athletics	Men's Slalom 3
Giuliano Koten	Lawn bowls	Male individual
Aroldo Ruschioni	Snooker	Male paraplegia
Giuseppe Trieste	Table tennis	Individual 2 male
Vittorio Paradiso; Jaculano; Marras	Archery	Round St. Nicholas by mixed paraplegia teams
