= Wheelchair fencing at the 1960 Summer Paralympics =

Wheelchair fencing at the I Paralympic Games
- Paralympic Wheelchair fencing

Wheelchair fencing at the 1960 Summer Paralympics consisted of three events.

== Medal summary ==
Event	Gold	Silver	Bronze
Men's sabre individual	Aurelio Tedone; Italy	Franco Rossi; Italy	Giovanni Ferraris; Italy
Men's sabre team	Italy (ITA); Giovanni Ferraris; Aurelio Tedone	Italy (ITA); Ottavio Moscone; Aroldo Ruschioni	Italy (ITA); Giovanni Berghella; Franco Rossi
Women's foil individual	Anna Maria Toso; Italy	Maria Scutti; Italy	Anna Maria Galimberti; Italy
