= Wheelchair fencing at the 1968 Summer Paralympics =

Wheelchair fencing at the III Paralympic Games
- Paralympic Wheelchair fencing

Wheelchair fencing at the 1968 Summer Paralympics consisted of ten events, seven for men and three for women.

== Medal summary ==
=== Men's events ===
Event	Gold	Silver	Bronze
Épée individual	Roberto Marson; Italy	Vittorio Loi; Italy	Serge Bec; France
Épée team	France (FRA)	Italy (ITA); Vittorio Loi; Roberto Marson; Franco Rossi	Great Britain (GBR); John Clark; Brian Dickinson; Terry Willett
Novices foil	Hans-Joachim Boehm; West Germany	Sasson Aharoni; Israel	Willi Schneider; West Germany
Foil individual	Roberto Marson; Italy	Vittorio Loi; Italy	Giuliano Koten; Italy
Foil team	Italy (ITA); Giovanni Ferraris; Vittorio Loi; Roberto Marson; Franco Rossi; Germano Zanarotto	France (FRA)	Great Britain (GBR); Cyril Thomas; John Clark; Joe Slattery
Sabre individual	Roberto Marson; Italy	Serge Bec; France	Wilfred van Brauene; Belgium
Sabre team	France (FRA)	Italy (ITA); Giovanni Ferraris; Roberto Marson; Germano Zanarotto	Israel (ISR)

=== Women's events ===
Event	Gold	Silver	Bronze
Novices foil	Shoshana Sharabi; Israel	Pequin; France	Ayala Malchan; Israel
Foil individual	Delattre; France	Elena Monaco; Italy	Sally Haynes; Great Britain
Foil team	Great Britain (GBR); Valerie Forder; Sally Haynes; Shelagh Finnegan	France (FRA)	Italy (ITA); Elena Monaco; Gabriella Monaco; Irene Monaco
