= Italy at the 1968 Summer Paralympics =

Italian delegation to sporting event

- IPC code: ITA
- NPC: Comitato Italiano Paralimpico
- Website: www.comitatoparalimpico.it (in Italian)

in Tel Aviv
- Competitors: 38 (33 men, 5 women)
- Medals Ranked 7th: Gold 12 Silver 10 Bronze 17 Total 39

Summer Paralympics appearances (overview)
- 1960; 1964; 1968; 1972; 1976; 1980; 1984; 1988; 1992; 1996; 2000; 2004; 2008; 2012; 2016; 2020; 2024

Italy competed at the 1968 Summer Paralympics in Tel Aviv, Israel. The team finished seventh in the medal table and won a total of 39 medals; 12 gold, 10 silver and 17 bronze.

== Medalists ==
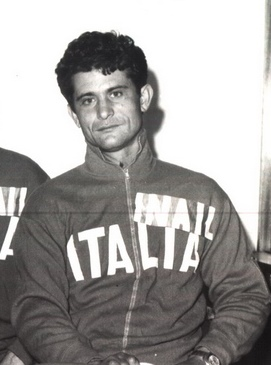
Vittorio Loi, four medals won at this edition of the Games.

Athlete	Sport	Event
GOLD
Irene Monaco	Athletics	Female D disk
Giovanni Benincasa	Athletics	Male C weight
Roberto Marson	Athletics	Club D men's
Roberto Marson	Athletics	Male D disc
Roberto Marson	Athletics	Javelin D male
Roberto Marson	Wheelchair fencing	Men's individual foil
Roberto Marson	Wheelchair fencing	Men's individual épée
Roberto Marson	Wheelchair fencing	Men's individual saber
Giovanni Ferraris; Vittorio Loi; Roberto Marson; Franco Rossi; Germano Zanarotto	Wheelchair fencing	Men's team foil
Roberto Marson	Swimming	50 m breaststroke class 5 (cauda equina) male
Roberto Marson	Swimming	50 m backstroke class 5 (cauda equina) male
Roberto Marson	Swimming	50 m free class 5 (cauda equina) male
SILVER
Silvana Martino	Athletics	Women's Open Class Precision Javelin
Elena Monaco	Athletics	Women's full pentathlon
Germano Pecchenino	Athletics	Club C men's
Germano Pecchenino	Athletics	Javelin C male
Elena Monaco	Wheelchair fencing	Women's individual foil
Vittorio Loi	Wheelchair fencing	Men's individual foil
Vittorio Loi	Wheelchair fencing	Men's individual épée
Vittorio Loi; Roberto Marson; Franco Rossi	Wheelchair fencing	Men's team épée
Giovanni Ferraris; Roberto Marson; Germano Zanarotto	Wheelchair fencing	Men's team saber
Francesco Deiana	Swimming	Men's 25 m full breaststroke class 2
BRONZE
Gabriella Monaco	Athletics	Club B women
Antonio Arizzi	Athletics	Club A men's
Antonio Arizzi	Athletics	Disc A male
Emilio Porto	Athletics	Club C men's
Roberto Marson	Athletics	Male D weight
Raimondo Longhi; Gambatesa	Lawn bowling	Men's Doubles
Francesco Deiana; Raimondo Longhi	Dartchery	Doubles open class mixed
Giuliano Koten	Wheelchair fencing	Men's individual foil
Elena Monaco; Gabriella Monaco; Irene Monaco	Wheelchair fencing	Women's team foil
Aroldo Ruschioni	Snooker	Male open class
Giovanni Ferraris	Table tennis	Individual B male
Giovanni Berghella	Table tennis	Individual C male
Giovanni Ferraris; Federico Zarilli	Table tennis	Doubles B men's
Giovanni Berghella; Aroldo Ruschioni	Table tennis	Doubles Men's C
Elena Monaco; Gabriella Monaco	Table tennis	Doubles B female
Rosaria La Corte; Irene Monaco	Table tennis	Doubles Women's C
Giuliano Koten	Archery	Men's Columbia Open Class Round

== Team ==
Thirty-eight Italian athletes competed at the Games; thirty-three men and five women.

=== Roberto Marson ===
Roberto Marson, who had previously won two gold medals in athletics at the 1964 Summer Paralympics in Tokyo, was proclaimed the outstanding athlete of the Games. He won ten gold medals, three in athletics field events, three in swimming and four in wheelchair fencing. He was considered one of the breakout stars of these Games considering his performances.

== See also ==
- Italy at the 1968 Summer Olympics
