= Athletics at the 1960 Summer Paralympics – Men's club throw A =

Men's club throw A at the I Paralympic Games
- Paralympic Athletics
- Competitors: 3 from 3 nations

Medalists
1st place, gold medalist(s)		Dick Thompson	Great Britain
2nd place, silver medalist(s)		W. Prossl	Germany
3rd place, bronze medalist(s)		Domenico Avitabile	Italy

The Men's club throw (category A) was one of the events held in Athletics at the 1960 Summer Paralympics in Rome.

There were only three competitors; all three therefore won a medal. Great Britain's Dick Thompson achieved a throw of 34.85m, taking the gold medal.

Rank	Athlete	Throw
1st place, gold medalist(s)	Dick Thompson (GBR)	34.85m
2nd place, silver medalist(s)	Walter Prössl (GER)	32.50m
3rd place, bronze medalist(s)	Domenico Avitabile (ITA)	31.40m
