= Athletics at the 1960 Summer Paralympics – Men's club throw B =

Men's club throw B at the I Paralympic Games
- Paralympic Athletics
- Competitors: 3 from 3 nations

Medalists
1st place, gold medalist(s)		Barbier	France
2nd place, silver medalist(s)		Carmelo Russo	Italy
3rd place, bronze medalist(s)		W. Prossl	Germany

The Men's club throw (category B) was one of the events held in Athletics at the 1960 Summer Paralympics in Rome.

There were only three competitors; all three therefore won a medal. France's Barbier (full name not recorded) achieved a throw of 38.24m, taking a clear lead for gold.

Rank	Athlete	Throw
1st place, gold medalist(s)	Barbier (FRA)	38.24m
2nd place, silver medalist(s)	Carmelo Russo (ITA)	34.60m
3rd place, bronze medalist(s)	W. Prossl (GER)	34.44m
