= Archery at the 1960 Summer Paralympics – Men's Columbia round open =

Men's Columbia round open at the I Paralympic Games
- Paralympic Archery
- Competitors: 3 from 2 nations

Medalists
1st place, gold medalist(s)		Trouverie	France
2nd place, silver medalist(s)		Delapietra	France
3rd place, bronze medalist(s)		Hepple	Great Britain

The Men's Columbia round open was one of the events held in Archery at the 1960 Summer Paralympics in Rome.

There were only three competitors, whose full names are not recorded. France's two representatives took gold and silver respectively, while the sole British competitor took bronze. Delapietra of France and Hepple of Great Britain obtained the same score (544), but the silver meddle was awarded to Delapietra.

Rank	Athlete	Score
1st place, gold medalist(s)	Camille Trouverie (FRA)	550
2nd place, silver medalist(s)	Delapietra (FRA)	544
3rd place, bronze medalist(s)	Carl Hepple (GBR)	544
