= Archery at the 1960 Summer Paralympics – Men's FITA round open =

Men's FITA round open at the I Paralympic Games
- Paralympic Archery
- Competitors: 3 from 2 nations

Medalists
1st place, gold medalist(s)		Jack Whitman	United States
2nd place, silver medalist(s)		Bradley	Great Britain
3rd place, bronze medalist(s)		Potter	Great Britain

The Men's FITA round open was one of the events held in archery at the 1960 Summer Paralympics in Rome.

There were only three competitors - two British and one American. The American archer, Jack Whitman, won gold with a clear lead, scoring 829 points.

Rank	Athlete	Score
1st place, gold medalist(s)	Jack Whitman (USA)	829
2nd place, silver medalist(s)	Bradley (GBR)	764
3rd place, bronze medalist(s)	Potter (GBR)	753
