= Archery at the 1960 Summer Paralympics – Men's Windsor round open =

Men's Windsor round open at the I Paralympic Games
- Paralympic Archery
- Competitors: 3 from 3 nations

Medalists
1st place, gold medalist(s)		Jack Whitman	United States
2nd place, silver medalist(s)		Bradley	Great Britain
3rd place, bronze medalist(s)		van Puymbroeck	Belgium

The Men's Windsor round open was one of the events held in archery at the 1960 Summer Paralympics in Rome.

There were only three competitors - representing Belgium, Great Britain and the United States. The American archer, Jack Whitman, won gold with a score of 800.

Rank	Athlete	Score
1st place, gold medalist(s)	Jack Whitman (USA)	800
2nd place, silver medalist(s)	Bradley (GBR)	764
3rd place, bronze medalist(s)	van Puymbroeck (BEL)	725
