= Archery at the 1960 Summer Paralympics – Men's St. Nicholas round open =

Men's St. Nicholas round open at the I Paralympic Games
- Paralympic Archery
- Competitors: 3 from 3 nations

Medalists
1st place, gold medalist(s)		Sutton	Australia
2nd place, silver medalist(s)		Figoni	France
3rd place, bronze medalist(s)		Sones	United States

The Men's St. Nicholas round open was one of the events held in Archery at the 1960 Summer Paralympics in Rome.

There were only three competitors, whose full names are not recorded. Each competitor therefore won a medal.

Rank	Athlete	Score
1st place, gold medalist(s)	Sutton (AUS)	670
2nd place, silver medalist(s)	Figoni (FRA)	648
3rd place, bronze medalist(s)	Sones (USA)	636
