= Dartchery at the 1960 Summer Paralympics =

Dartchery at the I Paralympic Games

Medalists
1st place, gold medalist(s)		Wayne Broeren; Jack Whitman	United States
2nd place, silver medalist(s)		Jim Mathis; John Tigyer	United States
3rd place, bronze medalist(s)		Bernabei; Camille Trouverie	France

The 1960 Summer Paralympics marked the introduction of the sport of Dartchery as a paralympic sport. Dartchery at the 1960 games was a mixed pairs event.

== Medal summary ==
Event	Gold	Silver	Bronze	
Mixed pairs open	United States (USA); Wayne Broeren; Jack Whitman	United States (USA); Jim Mathis; John Tigyer	France (FRA); Bernabei; Camille Trouverie	France (FRA); Bernabei; Samuel Ward
