= France at the 1960 Summer Paralympics =

- IPC code: FRA
- NPC: French Paralympic and Sports Committee
- Website: france-paralympique.fr

in Rome
- Competitors: 6 in 4 sports
- Medals Ranked 9th: Gold 3 Silver 3 Bronze 1 Total 7

Summer Paralympics appearances (overview)
- 1960; 1964; 1968; 1972; 1976; 1980; 1984; 1988; 1992; 1996; 2000; 2004; 2008; 2012; 2016; 2020; 2024

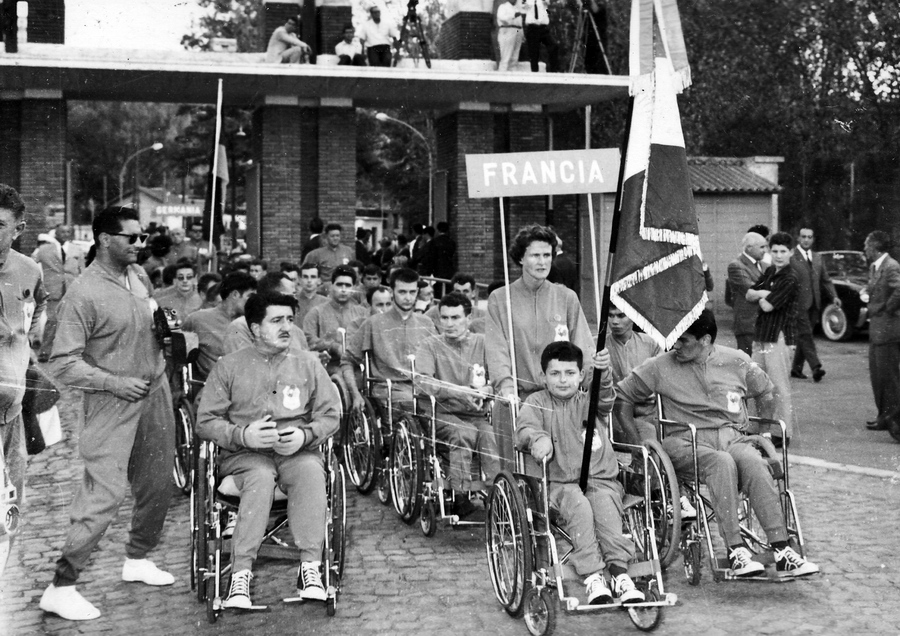
France at Rome 1960

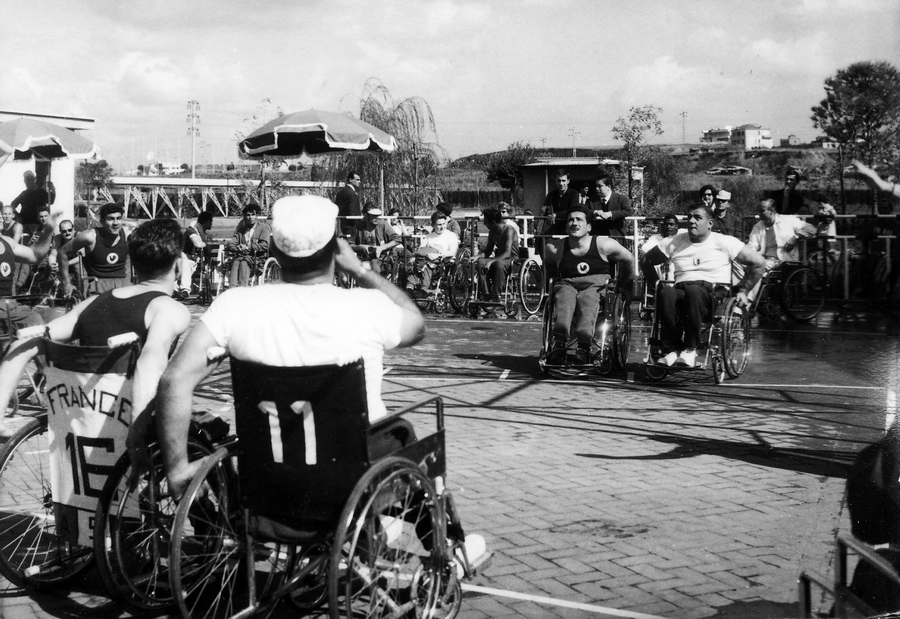
Basket team

France competed at the inaugural Summer Paralympic Games in 1960 in Rome. France's six athletes competed in four sports: archery, athletics, dartchery and swimming. All of France's athletes obtained medals in every event they competed in.

== Medallists ==
Medal	Name	Sport	Event
Gold	Trouverie	Archery	Men's Columbia round open
Gold	Barbier	Athletics	Men's club throw B
Gold	Jarrige	Swimming	Men's 25 metre crawl juniors incomplete class 2
Silver	Delapietra	Archery	Men's Columbia round open
Silver	Figoni	Archery	Men's St. Nicholas round open
Silver	Jarrige	Swimming	Men's 25 metre backstroke juniors incomplete class 2
Bronze	Bernabei & Trouverie	Dartchery	Mixed pairs open

== Archery ==
France entered three competitors in archery.

- Trouverie and Delapietra (full names not recorded) competed in the Men's Columbia round open. Trouverie took the gold medal with 550 points. Delapietra took silver, although his score of 544 was equal to that of Britain's Hepple, who was awarded bronze.
- In the Men's St. Nicholas round open, Figoni, for France, took silver with 648 points - behind Sutton of Australia, who scored 670, and ahead of Sones of the United States (636).

== Athletics ==
France's only entry in athletics was Barbier, who took gold in the Men's club throw (category B) with a throw of 38.24m.

== Dartchery ==
Bernabei and Trouverie, France's representatives in dartchery, finished third in the Mixed pairs open and took bronze.

== Swimming ==
Jarrige was France's only entry in swimming, and competed in two events:

- In the Men's 25 metre crawl juniors incomplete class 2, he was the only competitor, and won gold by completing the race with a time of 41.9.
- In the Men's 25 metre backstroke juniors incomplete class 2, he was one of only two competitors. His time of 46.8, well behind the time of 26.8 achieved by Kalberg of Norway, earned him the silver medal.

== See also ==
- France at the 1960 Summer Olympics
