= Italy at the 1980 Summer Paralympics =

- IPC code: ITA
- NPC: Comitato Italiano Paralimpico
- Website: www.comitatoparalimpico.it (in Italian)

in Arnhem
- Medals Ranked 20th: Gold 6 Silver 5 Bronze 9 Total 20

Summer Paralympics appearances (overview)
- 1960; 1964; 1968; 1972; 1976; 1980; 1984; 1988; 1992; 1996; 2000; 2004; 2008; 2012; 2016; 2020; 2024

Italy sent a delegation to compete at the 1980 Summer Paralympics in Arnhem, Netherlands. Its athletes finished twentieth in the overall medal count.

== Medalists ==
Medal	Athlete	Sport	Event
Gold	Gabriella Boreggio	Athletics	Women's Slalom 1C
Gold	Giovanni Ciuffreda	Athletics	Men's Slalom 1B
Gold	Osanna Brugnoli	Fencing	Women's Foil Individual
Gold	Paolo D'Agostini	Fencing	Mixed Foil Individual 1A
Gold	Giulio Martelli	Fencing	Men's Foil Individual
Gold	Rosa Sicari	Fencing	Mixed Foil Individual 1B
Silver	Lina Franzese	Athletics	100 m F1 women
Silver	Lina Franzese	Athletics	1500 m F1 women
Silver	Gabriella Boreggio	Athletics	60 m 1C women
Silver	Bruno Paganelli	Fencing	Florete individual 1B mix
Silver	Aldo Licciardi	Fencing	Florete individual 1C mix
Bronze	Anna Rita Serrone	Athletics	60 m 3 women
Bronze	Rosa Sicari	Athletics	Eslalon 1B women
Bronze	Gabriella Boreggio	Athletics	Discus 1C women
Bronze	Mario Panico	Athletics	800 m men
Bronze	Giuseppe Trieste	Athletics	Pentathlón 2 men
Bronze	Massimo Penna	Fencing	Epee individual 1C-3 men
Bronze	Vittorio Loi; Renzo Molinari; Germano Pecchenino; Oliver Venturi	Fencing	Sabre team men
Bronze	Gabriella Boreggio; Irene Monaco; Rosa Sicari	Fencing	Foil team women
Bronze	Rosa Sicari	Table tennis	Individual 1B women

== See also ==
- 1980 Summer Paralympics
- Italy at the 1980 Summer Olympics
