= Archery at the 1984 Summer Paralympics - Women's double FITA round integrated =

Women's double FITA round integrated at the VII Paralympic Games
- Paralympic Archery
- Competitors: 9 from 7 nations

Medalists
1st place, gold medalist(s)		Anneliese Dersen	West Germany
2nd place, silver medalist(s)		Martine Lacomblez	Belgium
3rd place, bronze medalist(s)		Irene Monaco	Italy

The Women's double FITA round integrated was an archery competition at the 1984 Summer Paralympics.

The German archer Anneliese Dersen won the gold medal.

== Results ==
Rank	Athlete	Points
1st place, gold medalist(s)	Anneliese Dersen (FRG)	2250
2nd place, silver medalist(s)	Martine Lacomblez (BEL)	2206
3rd place, bronze medalist(s)	Irene Monaco (ITA)	2098
4	E. Trizsi (HUN)	1978
5	D. L. Kim (KOR)	1973
6	S. Lascaux (FRA)	1964
7	Marie Rosvik (NOR)	1901
8	G. Klein (HUN)	1807
9	M. Perrin (FRA)	1785
