= Whitewash (sport) =

Sports term for series in which the winning team wins all the games

In sport, a whitewash or sweep (N. America) is a series in which a person or team wins every game, or when a player or team wins a match to-nil.

== Usage by sport ==
=== Baseball ===
In Major League Baseball, teams typically play multiple games against each other; if one team wins all the games in that series, it is considered a "series sweep", or simply, a "sweep". In many cases, fans of the team in the favored position, when all but one contest in the current series have been won, will bring brooms (either real brooms or large props for better visibility) to the ballpark with which to taunt the losing team, or the team that was "swept".

On rare occasions, a "season series sweep" can be accomplished, in which every contest between two teams is won by the same team. Intra-division season sweeps are relatively rare, since with the relatively large number of games against intra-division teams (14 per divisional matchup), the division rivals are more likely to find at least one lucky matchup. In cases where two teams only play each other once in the season, there is no distinction made between a series and season sweep.

=== Basketball ===
The NBA Playoffs comprises four rounds of best-of-seven series; any team that wins the first four games of a playoff series would have accomplished a series sweep. However, in early playoff seasons, there were two game sweeps in a best-of three series. And in later years, there were three game sweeps in a best-of-five series.

=== Cricket ===
In cricket, a whitewash is when a team wins all the matches played in a series.

=== Ice hockey ===
The Stanley Cup playoffs comprises four rounds of best-of-seven series; any team that wins the first four games of a playoff series would have accomplished a series sweep.

The Stanley Cup finals have had 20 sweeps since it was expanded to a best-of-seven series in 1939. There were five sweeps in the 1990s, the most recent decade to have a sweep in the finals.

=== Rugby football ===
The term whitewash is also used in both codes of rugby football when one team loses every match in a particular series.

The team that comes last in the Six Nations Championship (where a sweep over the others is referred to as the Grand Slam) has the ignominy of being awarded the wooden spoon, even if they have not suffered a complete whitewash.

In rugby league's State of Origin series, a whitewash (also known as a clean sweep) is made by the team that wins all three games in a series. This was last achieved by Queensland in 2010.

=== Snooker ===
Whitewash is a term used in snooker when a player wins a match without losing a single frame.

=== Tennis ===
In ATP and WTA tennis, the term whitewash is used when a player fails to win a game in a match (6–0, 6–0, 6–0; or 6–0, 6–0), also called a triple- or double-bagel respectively. Double bagels are more common.

=== Darts ===
The term whitewash is used in darts when a player wins a match without losing a single leg or set.

== See also ==
- Podium sweep
- Shutout
- Perfect season, winning all regular season or group stage games
