= Italy at the 1960 Summer Paralympics =

Italian delegation to sporting event

- IPC code: ITA
- NPC: Comitato Italiano Paralimpico
- Website: www.comitatoparalimpico.it (in Italian)

in Rome
- Competitors: 65
- Medals Ranked 1st: Gold 29 Silver 28 Bronze 23 Total 80

Summer Paralympics appearances (overview)
- 1960; 1964; 1968; 1972; 1976; 1980; 1984; 1988; 1992; 1996; 2000; 2004; 2008; 2012; 2016; 2020; 2024

Italy was the host country of the inaugural Paralympic Games in 1960 in Rome. The country fielded the largest delegation at the Games, with twenty-seven athletes (twenty-three men and four women) competing in athletics, snooker, swimming, table tennis and wheelchair fencing.

== Medals ==
27 of Italy's competitors won medals, in 6 sports, enabling the country to top the medal chart with 29 gold medals, 28 silver and 23 bronze.

=== Medalists ===
- The information from the International Paralympic Committee (IPC) website is based on sources which does not present all information from earlier Paralympic Games (1960–1984), such as relay and team members.

Medal	Name	Sport	Event
Gold	Grimaldi	Athletics	Precision javelin throw B
Gold	Felice Lenardon	Athletics	Precision javelin throw C
Gold	Enzo Santini	Athletics	Javelin throw C
Gold	Maria Scutti	Athletics	Club throw A
Gold	Maria Scutti	Athletics	Club throw B
Gold	Maria Scutti	Athletics	Javelin throw A
Gold	Maria Scutti	Athletics	Javelin throw B
Gold	Maria Scutti	Athletics	Precision javelin throw A
Gold	Maria Scutti	Athletics	Precision javelin throw B
Gold	Maria Scutti	Athletics	Precision javelin throw C
Gold	Maria Scutti	Athletics	Shot put A
Gold	Maria Scutti	Athletics	Shot put B
Gold	Carlo Jannucci	Swimming	25 m crawl complete class 2
Gold	Carlo Jannucci	Swimming	25 m breaststroke complete class 2
Gold	Ottavio Moscone	Swimming	25 m backstroke incomplete class 2
Gold	Renzo Rogo	Swimming	25 m crawl incomplete class 2
Gold	Renzo Rogo	Swimming	25 m breaststroke incomplete class 2
Gold	Franco Rossi	Swimming	50 m breaststroke complete class 5
Gold	Enzo Santini	Swimming	50 m backstroke incomplete class 4
Gold	Enzo Santini	Swimming	50 m crawl incomplete class 4
Gold	Maria Scutti	Swimming	50 m breaststroke complete class 4
Gold	Anna Maria Toso	Swimming	25 m crawl incomplete class 2
Gold	Anna Maria Toso	Swimming	25 m breaststroke incomplete class 2
Gold	Giovanni Berghella	Table tennis	Singles C
Gold	Giovanni Ferraris; Federico Zarilli	Table tennis	Doubles B
Gold	Franco Rossi; Aroldo Ruschioni	Table tennis	Doubles C
Gold	Aurelio Tedone	Wheelchair fencing	Men's sabre individual
Gold	Giovanni Ferraris; Aurelio Tedone	Wheelchair fencing	Men's sabre team
Gold	Anna Maria Toso	Wheelchair fencing	Women's foil individual
Silver	Anna Maria Galimberti	Athletics	Club throw A
Silver	Anna Maria Galimberti	Athletics	Javelin throw A
Silver	Anna Maria Galimberti	Athletics	Shot put A
Silver	Anna Maria Galimberti	Athletics	Shot put B
Silver	Anna Maria Toso	Athletics	Precision javelin throw A
Silver	Anna Maria Toso	Athletics	Precision javelin throw B
Silver	Anna Maria Toso	Athletics	Precision javelin throw C
Silver	Felice Lenardon	Athletics	Javelin throw A
Silver	Felice Lenardon	Athletics	Shot put A
Silver	Felice Lenardon	Athletics	Shot put B
Silver	Carmelo Russo	Athletics	Club throw B
Silver	Carmelo Russo	Athletics	Javelin throw B
Silver	Carfagna	Swimming	50 m backstroke complete class 5
Silver	Carlo Jannucci	Swimming	25 m backstroke complete class 2
Silver	Di Pasquo	Swimming	50 m breaststroke complete class 4
Silver	Grimaldi	Swimming	25 m breaststroke incomplete class 2
Silver	Girardi	Swimming	25 m crawl incomplete class 1
Silver	Grimaldi	Swimming	25 m crawl incomplete class 2
Silver	Fontana	Swimming	25 m crawl complete class 2
Silver	Maria Scutti	Swimming	50 m backstroke complete class 4
Silver	Anna Maria Toso	Swimming	25 m backstroke incomplete class 2
Silver	Domenico Cascella	Table tennis	Singles A
Silver	Francesco Scalzo	Table tennis	Singles B
Silver	Giovanni Ferraris; Federico Zarilli	Table tennis	Doubles C
Silver	Maria Scutti; Anna Maria Toso	Table tennis	Doubles B
Silver	Franco Rossi	Wheelchair fencing	Men's sabre individual
Silver	Ottavio Moscone; Aroldo Ruschioni	Wheelchair fencing	Men's sabre team
Silver	Maria Scutti	Wheelchair fencing	Women's foil individual
Bronze	Domenico Avitabile	Athletics	Club throw A
Bronze	Castelli	Athletics	Precision javelin throw B
Bronze	Anna Maria Galimberti	Athletics	Club throw B
Bronze	Maria Scutti	Athletics	Club throw C
Bronze	Anna Maria Galimberti	Athletics	Javelin throw B
Bronze	Felice Lenardon	Athletics	Javelin throw B
Bronze	Maria Scutti	Athletics	Javelin throw C
Bronze	Anna Maria Toso	Athletics	Shot put A
Bronze	Giovanni Ferraris	Snooker	Men's paraplegics
Bronze	Pasquarelli	Swimming	25 m backstroke incomplete class 1
Bronze	Fontana	Swimming	25 m breaststroke complete class 2
Bronze	Cipriano Gasperini	Swimming	50 m breaststroke complete class 3
Bronze	Ottavio Moscone	Swimming	25 m breaststroke incomplete class 2
Bronze	Ottavio Moscone	Swimming	25 m crawl incomplete class 2
Bronze	Franco Rossi	Swimming	50 m crawl complete class 5
Bronze	Aroldo Ruschioni	Swimming	50 m backstroke complete class 3
Bronze	Mazzoni	Swimming	25 m backstroke incomplete class 2
Bronze	Anna Maria Toso	Table tennis	Singles B
Bronze	Federico Zarilli	Table tennis	Singles B
Bronze	Federico Zarilli	Table tennis	Singles C
Bronze	Giovanni Ferraris	Wheelchair fencing	Men's sabre individual
Bronze	Giovanni Berghella; Franco Rossi	Wheelchair fencing	Men's sabre team
Bronze	Anna Maria Galimberti	Wheelchair fencing	Women's foil individual

=== Multiple medallists ===
These are official report of International Paralympic Committee.

#	Athlete	Gold medal	Silver medal	Bronze medal
1	Maria Scutti	10	3	2
2	Anna Maria Toso	3	5	2
3	Enzo Santini	3	0	0
4	Franco Rossi	2	1	2
4	Giovanni Ferraris	2	1	2
6	Carlo Jannucci	2	1	0
7	Renzo Rogo	2	0	0

== See also ==
- Italy at the 1960 Summer Olympics
