= Podium sweep =

Sports term where a team or nation comes in first, second and third

A podium sweep is where a team or nation comes in first, second and third, such as at the Olympics, and wins all available medals, which are recognized by a podium ceremony. The word sweep is commonly used in North American sports such as baseball, basketball, cricket and ice hockey which have playoff or regular season series, to describe a situation where one team wins all the games in a series, for example, with a 4–0 victory in a best-of-seven series.

The term is also used in a broader sense when a country, team or athlete wins all possible prizes in a competition. At the highest level, that would be when one nation wins all the medals in the Olympics.

== Prevention ==
To encourage competition, some event organizers or federations implement rules to prevent podium sweeps. At the 2008 Olympic Games, China won all six medals at the singles events in Table Tennis, across both genders. Following this, the ITTF limited each country at the Olympics to entering a maximum of two contestants per gender in the singles competition, thereby ensuring that no country could win more than four of the six medals available.

== Lists of podium sweeps ==
- List of medal sweeps in Olympic athletics
- List of medal sweeps in Olympic table tennis
- List of medal sweeps in Olympic speed skating
- List of medal sweeps in Olympic figure skating
- List of medal sweeps in Olympic snowboarding
- List of medal sweeps in Olympic cross-country skiing
- List of medal sweeps in Paralympic Games

== See also ==
- Whitewash (sport)
