= Irene Monaco =

Italian Paralympic competitor

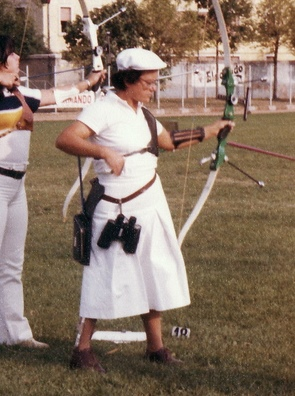
- Irene in Vignola in 1978 during an open archery competition at the age of 48.

Personal information
- Born: 7 October 1940 (age 85) Rome, Italy
- Spouse: Uber Sala

Sport
- Country: Italy
- Sport: Para archery; Para athletics; Para swimming; Para table tennis; Wheelchair fencing
- Disability: Poliomyelitis
- Club: Ascip Ostia
Medal record
Representing Italy
Event / 1st / 2nd / 3rd; Paralympic Games / 3 / 1 / 6
Paralympic Games
Women's para archery
Bronze medal – third place	1984 Stoke Mandeville	Double FITA Round Integrated
Women's para athletics
Gold medal – first place	1980 Tokyo	Discus Throw D
Gold medal – first place	1968 Tel Aviv	Discus Throw D
Women's para table tennis
Bronze medal – third place	1968 Tel Aviv	Doubles C
Women's para swimming
Silver medal – second place	1964 Tokyo	50 m Freestyle Prone Incomplete class 4
Bronze medal – third place	1964 Tokyo	50 m Freestyle Supine Incomplete class 4
Bronze medal – third place	1964 Tokyo	50 m Breaststroke Incomplete class 4
Women's wheelchair fencing
Gold medal – first place	1964 Tokyo	Foil Team
Bronze medal – third place	1968 Tel Aviv	Foil Team
Bronze medal – third place	1980 Arnhem	Foil Team

Irene Monaco (born 7 October 1940) is a former Italian a paralympic multi-sport athlete who won ten medals at the Summer Paralympics from 1964 to 1984.

Married to paralympic athlete Uber Sala who competed at the 1968 Summer Paralympics in Dartchery. She has a twin sister Elena, who also has polio. who won six medals at the Summer Paralympics between Tokyo 1964 and Tel Aviv 1968.

== Career ==
Irene Monaco continued to compete in archery in the masters category until almost 50 years, winning some national and world titles.

== See also ==
- Italian multiple medallists at the Summer Paralympics
- Italy at the 1964 Summer Paralympics
- Italy at the 1968 Summer Paralympics
- Italy at the 1980 Summer Paralympics
- Italy at the 1984 Summer Paralympics
