= West Germany at the 1960 Summer Paralympics =

Germany at the 1960 Summer Paralympics
- Flag of Germany
- IPC code: GER
- NPC: National Paralympic Committee Germany
- Website: www.dbs-npc.de (in German)

in Rome
- Medals Ranked 3rd: Gold 15 Silver 6 Bronze 9 Total 30

Summer Paralympics appearances (overview)
- 1960; 1964; 1968; 1972; 1976; 1980; 1984; 1988; 1992; 1996; 2000; 2004; 2008; 2012; 2016; 2020; 2024

Other related appearances
- East Germany (1984)

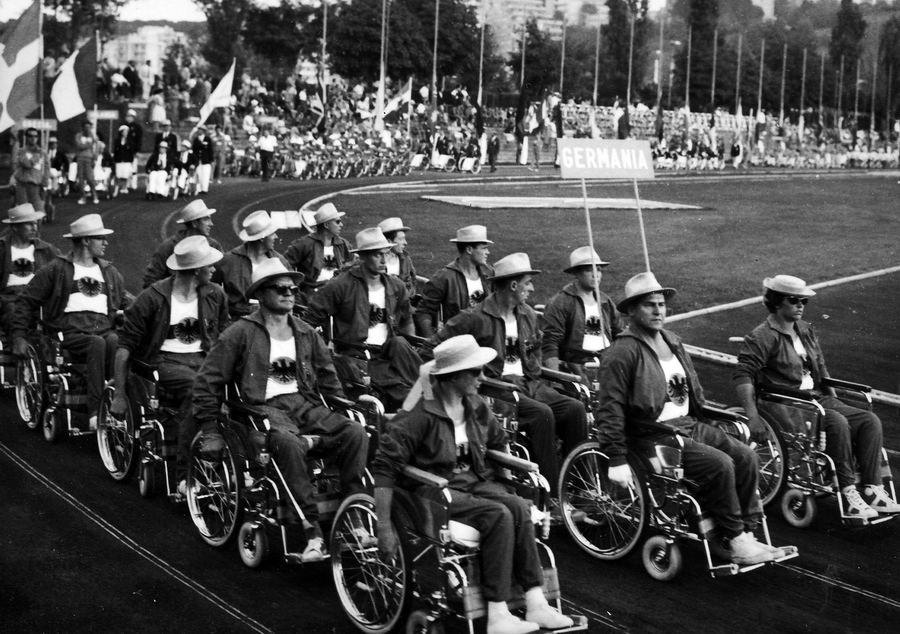
West Germany at Rome 1960

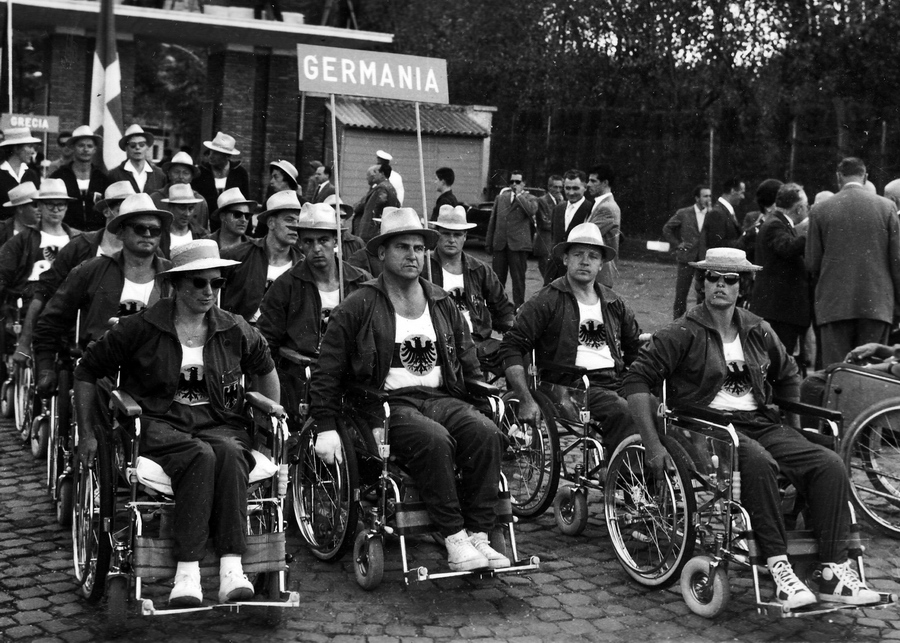
West Germany at Rome 1960

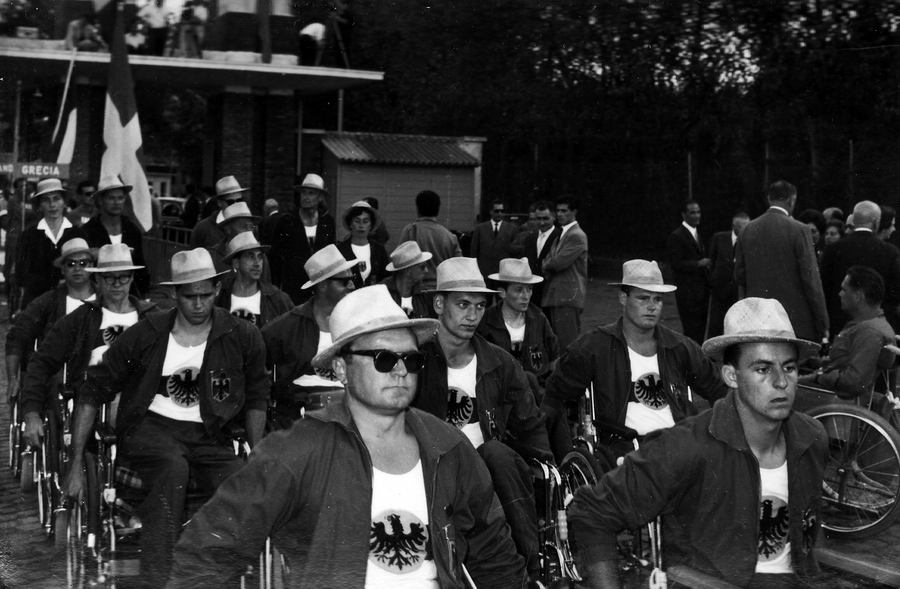
West Germany at Rome 1960

West Germany sent a delegation to compete at the 1960 Summer Paralympics in Rome, Italy. Its athletes finished third in the gold and overall medal count.

== Medalists ==
Medal	Name	Sport	Event
Gold	Walter Prossl	Athletics	Men's shot put A
Gold	Walter Prossl	Athletics	Men's shot put B
Gold	Zander	Athletics	Women's club throw C
Gold	Zander	Athletics	Women's javelin throw C
Gold	Zander	Athletics	Women's shot put C
Gold	Stroebel	Swimming	Men's 25m backstroke complete class 1
Gold	Sodenkamp	Swimming	Men's 50m backstroke incomplete class 3
Gold	Stroebel	Swimming	Men's 25m breaststroke complete class 1
Gold	Wetzel	Swimming	Men's 25m breaststroke incomplete class 1 and 2
Gold	Sodenkamp	Swimming	Men's 50m breaststroke incomplete class 3
Gold	Men's team	Swimming	Men's 3x50m medley relay open
Gold	Zander	Swimming	Women's 50m crawl incomplete class 4
Gold	Zander	Swimming	Women's 50m backstroke incomplete class 4
Gold	Zander	Swimming	Women's 50m breaststroke incomplete class 4
Gold	Marlene Muhlendyck	Table tennis	Women's singles B
Silver	Walter Prossl	Athletics	Men's club throw A
Silver	Marlene Muhlendyck	Athletics	Women's club throw B
Silver	Marlene Muhlendyck	Athletics	Women's javelin throw B
Silver	Wetzel	Swimming	Men's 25m backstroke incomplete class 1
Silver	Kadau	Swimming	Men's 50m breaststroke incomplete class 3
Silver	Marlene Muhlendyck	Swimming	Women's 50m backstroke incomplete class 3
Bronze	Zander	Archery	Women's St. Nicholas round open
Bronze	Walter Prossl	Athletics	Men's club throw B
Bronze	Walter Prossl	Athletics	Men's javelin throw A
Bronze	Jacob	Athletics	Men's precision javelin throw A
Bronze	Marlene Muhlendyck	Athletics	Women's precision javelin throw B
Bronze	Marlene Muhlendyck	Athletics	Women's shot put B
Bronze	Sodenkamp	Swimming	Men's 50m crawl incomplete class 3
Bronze	Sinterman	Swimming	Men's 50m crawl incomplete class 4
Bronze	Marlene Muhlendyck; Zander	Table tennis	Women's doubles C

== See also ==
- Germany at the 1960 Summer Olympics
