= Swimming at the 1960 Summer Paralympics – Men's 25 metre backstroke juniors incomplete class 2 =

Men's 25 metre backstroke juniors incomplete class 2 at the I Paralympic Games
- Paralympic Swimming
- Competitors: 2 from 2 nations

Medalists
1st place, gold medalist(s)		Karlberg	Norway
2nd place, silver medalist(s)		Jarrige	France

The Men's 25 metre backstroke juniors incomplete class 2 was one of the events held in swimming at the 1960 Summer Paralympics in Rome.

As there were only two competitors, both men were guaranteed a medal if they finished the race. Karlberg of Norway did so in 26.8s to take gold with a clear lead; Jarrige of France finished in 46.8s to take silver.

Rank	Athlete	Time
1st place, gold medalist(s)	Karlberg (NOR)	26.8s
2nd place, silver medalist(s)	Jarrige (FRA)	46.8s
