= United States at the 1960 Summer Paralympics =

- Flag of the United States
- IPC code: USA (SUA used at these Games)
- NPC: United States Paralympic Committee
- Website: www.teamusa.org/US-Paralympics

in Rome
- Competitors: 24
- Medals Ranked 5th: Gold 11 Silver 7 Bronze 7 Total 25

Summer Paralympics appearances (overview)
- 1960; 1964; 1968; 1972; 1976; 1980; 1984; 1988; 1992; 1996; 2000; 2004; 2008; 2012; 2016; 2020; 2024

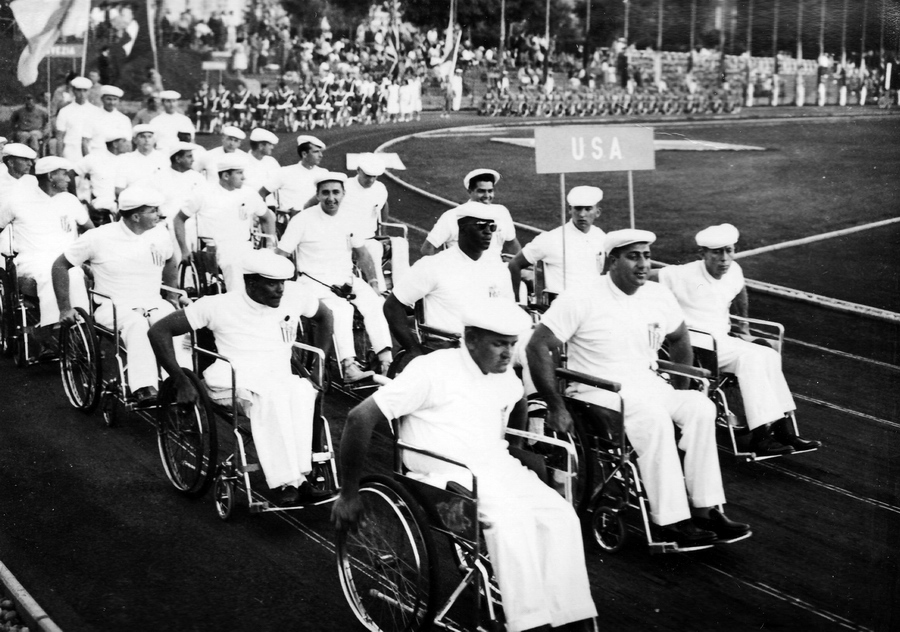
USA at Rome 1960

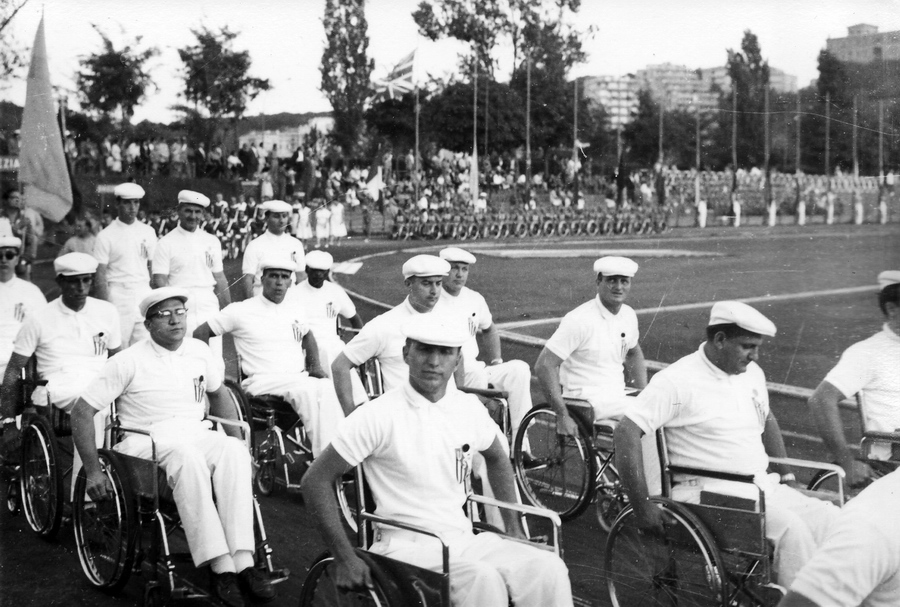
USA at Rome 1960

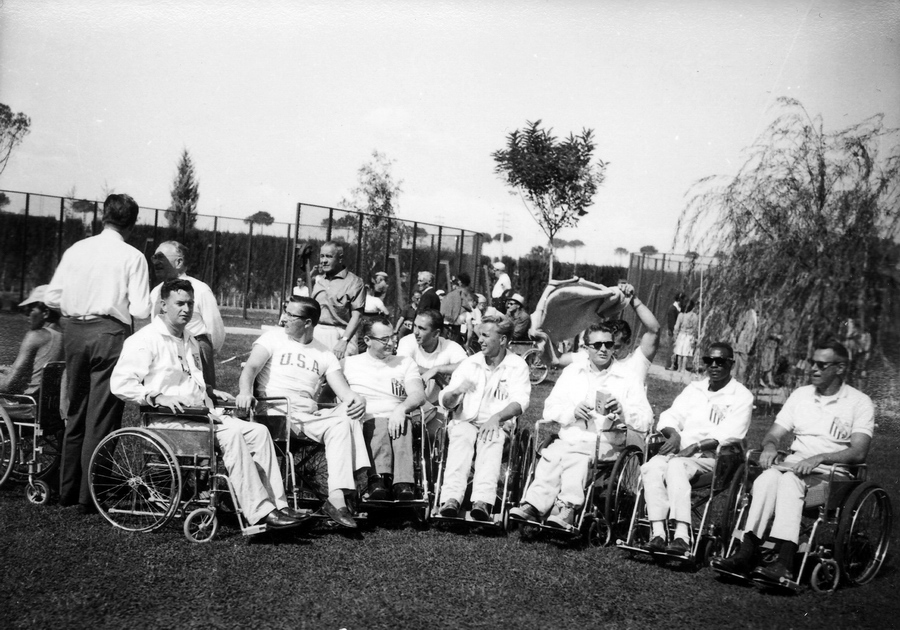
USA at Rome 1960

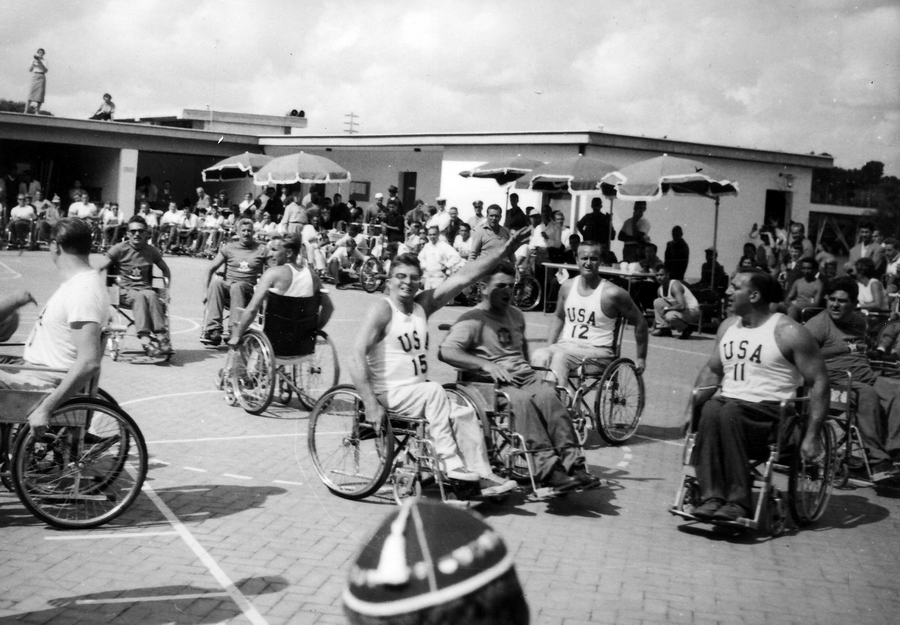
US team during a basketball match

The United States competed at the 1960 Summer Paralympics in Rome, Italy.

== Medalists ==
Medal	Name	Sport	Event
Gold	Jack Whitman	Archery	Men's FITA Round open
Gold	Jack Whitman	Archery	Men's Windsor Round open
Gold	Ron Stein	Athletics	Men's club throw C
Gold	Ron Stein	Athletics	Men's pentathlon open
Gold	Ron Stein	Athletics	Men's shot put C
Gold	Jack Whitman; Wayne Broeren	Dartchery	Mixed pairs open
Gold	Robert C. Hawkes	Swimming	Men's 50 m breaststroke complete class 3
Gold	William Johnson	Swimming	Men's 50 m backstroke complete class 3
Gold	Richard Maduro	Swimming	Men's 50 m backstroke complete class 4
Gold	Phil Hall; Bob Hawkes; Bill Johnson; Peter Krajewski; Dick Maduro; Jim Mathis; Frank Vecera; Alonzo Wilkins; Gene Camp; Percy Mabee; Eugene Taylor	Wheelchair basketball	Men's class A
Gold		Wheelchair basketball	Men's class B
Silver	Jim Mathis; John Tigyer	Dartchery	Mixed pairs open
Silver	Robert C. Hawkes	Swimming	Men's 50 m backstroke complete class 3
Silver	William Johnson	Swimming	Men's 50 m breaststroke complete class 3
Silver	Richard Maduro	Swimming	Men's 50 m crawl complete class 4
Silver	Paul Sones	Swimming	Men's 50 m backstroke incomplete class 4
Silver	Paul Sones	Swimming	Men's 50 m crawl incomplete class 4
Silver	Vincent Ward	Swimming	Men's 25 m breaststroke complete class 2
Bronze	Paul Sones	Archery	Men's St. Nicholas Round open
Bronze	Saul Welger	Athletics	Men's shot put C
Bronze	Philip Hall	Swimming	Men's 50 m crawl complete class 4
Bronze	Robert C. Hawkes	Swimming	Men's 50 m crawl complete class 3
Bronze	Paul Sones	Swimming	Men's 50 m breaststroke incomplete class 4
Bronze	Vincent Ward	Swimming	Men's 25 m backstroke complete class 2
Bronze	Vincent Ward	Swimming	Men's 25 m crawl complete class 2

== See also ==
- United States at the 1960 Summer Olympics
