= Carl Hepple =

British Paralympic athlete

Personal information
- Nationality: British

Sport
- Sport: Archery; Athletics; Shooting; Wheelchair basketball
Medal record
Representing Great Britain
Paralympic Games
Archery
Bronze medal – third place	1960 Rome	Men's Columbia Round Open
Athletics
Bronze medal – third place	1960 Rome	Men's Javelin C
Wheelchair basketball
Bronze medal – third place	1968 Tel Aviv	Men's team

Carl Hepple is a British multi-sport Paralympic athlete. In the 1960 Summer Paralympics he competed in multiple sports including archery, athletics and wheelchair basketball. In the 1980s, Carl also competed in shooting. In 1968, he was part of the British men's wheelchair basketball team which finished third.
