= Felice Lenardon =

Italian Paralympic athlete

Sport
- Country: Italy
- Sport: Paralympic athletics
Medal record
Paralympic athletics
Representing Italy
Paralympic Games
Gold medal – first place	1960 Rome	Precision javelin throw B
Silver medal – second place	1960 Rome	Javelin throw A
Silver medal – second place	1960 Rome	Shot put A
Silver medal – second place	1960 Rome	Shot put B
Bronze medal – third place	1960 Rome	Javelin throw B

Felice Lenardon is a former Italian paralympic athlete who won five medals at the Summer Paralympics.
