= Athletics at the 1960 Summer Paralympics =

Athletics at the I Paralympic Games
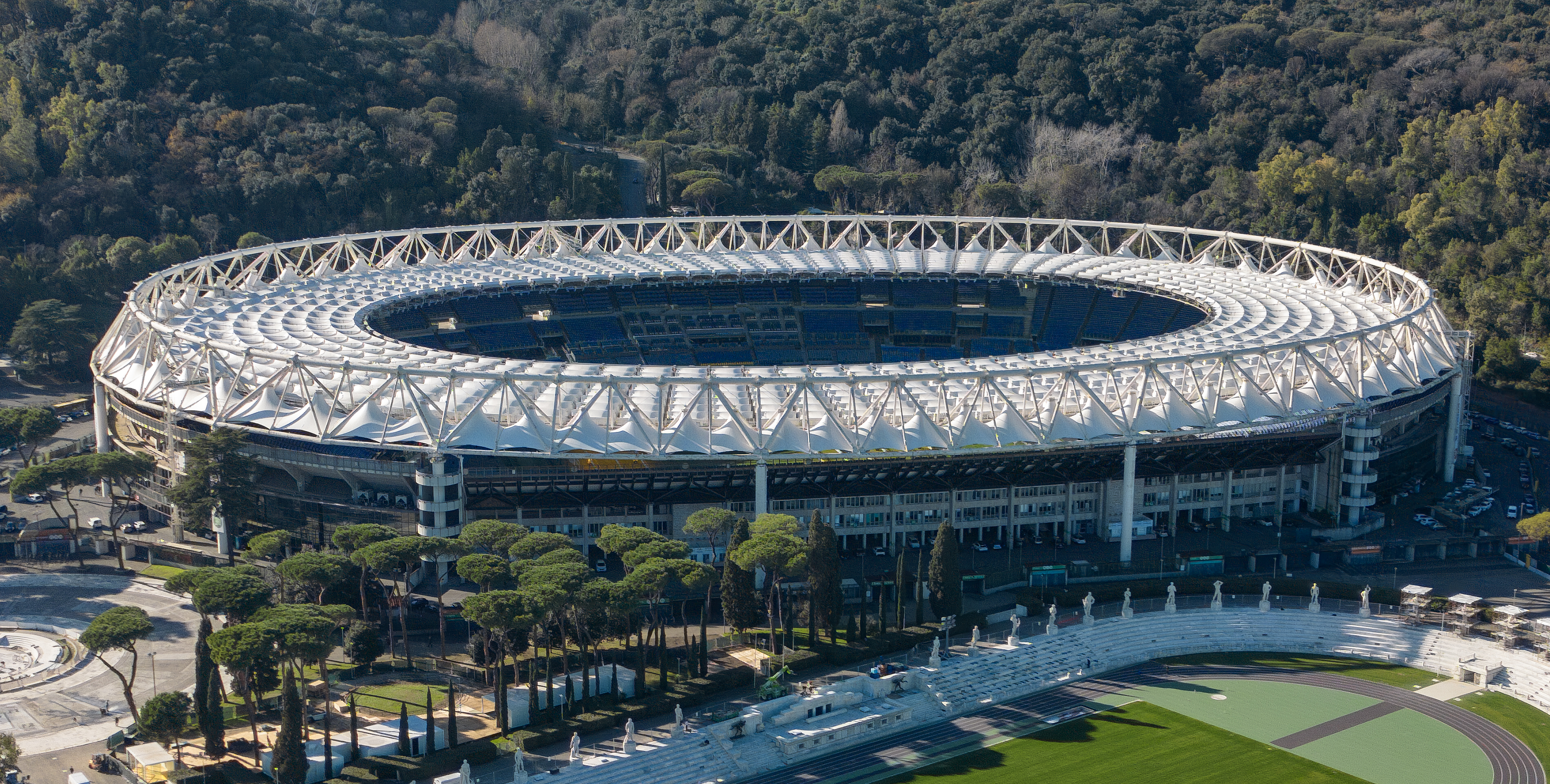
- Host stadium (shown in 2024)
- Competitors: 31 from 10 nations

Athletics at the 1960 Summer Paralympics consisted of 25 events, 13 for men and 12 for women.

== Participating nations ==
- Australia (3)
- Austria (5)
- France (1)
- Great Britain (3)
- Italy (9)
- Malta (2)
- Netherlands (1)
- Switzerland (1)
- United States (2)
- West Germany (4)

== Medal summary ==
Rank	Nation	Gold	Silver	Bronze	Total
1	Italy (ITA)	12	12	8	32
2	West Germany (FRG)	5	3	5	13
3	Great Britain (GBR)	4	0	4	8
4	United States (USA)	3	0	1	4
5	France (FRA)	1	0	0	1
6	Australia (AUS)	0	4	1	5
7	Netherlands (NED)	0	2	0	2
7	Switzerland (SUI)	0	2	0	2
9	Austria (AUT)	0	1	5	6
10	Malta (MLT)	0	1	1	2
Totals (10 entries)		25	25	25	75

=== Men's events ===
Event	Gold	Silver	Bronze
Club throw A	Dick Thompson; Great Britain	Walter Prossl; West Germany	Domenico Avitabile; Italy
Club throw B	Marcel Barbier; France	Carmelo Russo; Italy	Walter Prossl; West Germany
Club throw C	Ron Stein; United States	Dik Kruidenier; Netherlands	Russ Scott; Great Britain
Javelin throw A	Dick Thompson; Great Britain	Felice Lenardon; Italy	Walter Prossl; West Germany
Javelin throw B	Dick Thompson; Great Britain	Carmelo Russo; Italy	Felice Lenardon; Italy
Javelin throw C	Enzo Santini; Italy	Denis Favre; Switzerland	Carl Hepple; Great Britain
Precision javelin throw A	Dick Thompson; Great Britain	Frank Ponta; Australia	Jacob; West Germany
Precision javelin throw B	Grimaldi; Italy	Gary Hooper; Australia	Castelli; Italy
Precision javelin throw C	Felice Lenardon; Italy	Walter Telsnig; Austria	Engelbert Rangger; Austria
Shot put A	Walter Prossl; West Germany	Felice Lenardon; Italy	Dick Thompson; Great Britain
Shot put B	Walter Prossl; West Germany	Felice Lenardon; Italy	Claude Markham; Malta
Shot put C	Ron Stein; United States	Denis Favre; Switzerland	Saul Welger; United States
Pentathlon open	Ron Stein; United States	Dik Kruidenier; Netherlands	Russ Scott; Great Britain

=== Women's events ===
Event	Gold	Silver	Bronze
Club throw A	Maria Scutti; Italy	Anna Maria Galimberti; Italy	Manette Berger-Waldenegg; Austria
Club throw B	Maria Scutti; Italy	Marlene Muhlendyck; West Germany	Anna Maria Galimberti; Italy
Club throw C	Christa Zander; West Germany	Timothy Manning; Australia	Maria Scutti; Italy
Javelin throw A	Maria Scutti; Italy	Anna Maria Galimberti; Italy	Manette Berger-Waldenegg; Austria
Javelin throw B	Maria Scutti; Italy	Marlene Muhlendyck; West Germany	Anna Maria Galimberti; Italy
Javelin throw C	Christa Zander; West Germany	Daphne Ceeney; Australia	Maria Scutti; Italy
Precision javelin throw A	Maria Scutti; Italy	Anna Maria Toso; Italy	Ilse Driessler; Austria
Precision javelin throw B	Maria Scutti; Italy	Anna Maria Toso; Italy	Marlene Muhlendyck; West Germany
Precision javelin throw C	Maria Scutti; Italy	Anna Maria Toso; Italy	Rosi Kohlmannhuber; Austria
Shot put A	Maria Scutti; Italy	Anna Maria Galimberti; Italy	Anna Maria Toso; Italy
Shot put B	Maria Scutti; Italy	Anna Maria Galimberti; Italy	Marlene Muhlendyck; West Germany
Shot put C	Christa Zander; West Germany	Angela Scicluna; Malta	Daphne Ceeney; Australia
