= Jack Whitman =

American paralympic archer and dartcher

Personal information
- Died: September 30, 2004 Champaign, Illinois, U.S.

Sport
- Country: United States
- Sport: Archery; Dartchery
- Disability: Paraplegia
Medal record
Representing United States
Paralympic Games
Archery
Gold medal – first place	1960 Rome	Men's FITA round open
Gold medal – first place	1960 Rome	Men's Windsor round open
Gold medal – first place	1964 Tokyo	Albion round team open
Dartchery
Gold medal – first place	1960 Rome	Mixed pairs open

Jack Whitman (died September 30, 2004) was an American paralympic archer and dartcher. He competed at the 1960 and 1964 Summer Paralympics.

== Biography ==
Whitman was raised on a farm in Galesburg, Illinois. He attended Galesburg High School, where he played football and track athletics, graduating in 1948. After graduating, Whitman attended the University of Illinois in 1949, where he became paralyzed in an accident while competing in the gymnastics team. He returned to the University of Illinois in 1952. He took up archery after a neighbor provided him with a bow and arrow in 1960.

Whitman participated in the 1960 Summer Paralympics, participating in the first archery competition at the Paralympic Games. He was awarded the gold medal in the men's FITA round open event. Whitman scored 829 points. He also participated in the men's Windsor round open event, being awarded the gold medal. Whitman scored 800 points. He also participated in the first dartchery competition at the Paralympic Games. Whitman was awarded the gold medal along with athlete, Wayne Broeren in the mixed pairs open event. He participated at the 1964 Summer Paralympics, with participating in the archery competition at the Paralympic Games. Whitman participated in the men's albion round open, winning no medal for which he came in fourth place with his score being 759 points. He also participated in the albion round team open and FITA round team open events, winning gold medals in both. Whitman participated in the albion round team open event along with Dick Robinson and Dean Slaugh, scoring 2253 points. He also participated in the FITA round team open event along with Jim Mathis and Dean Slaugh.

Whitman was inducted into the United States Wheelchair Sports Hall of Fame, in 1971. He died on September 30, 2004, at his home in Champaign, Illinois.
