= Wayne Broeren =

American Paralympic athlete

Personal information
- Full name: Wayne Henry Broeren
- Born: 2 March 1933 Tiskilwa, Illinois, United States
- Died: 25 March 1991 (aged 58) Fort Myers, Florida, United States

Sport
- Sport: Dartchery; Wheelchair basketball
Medal record
Representing United States
Paralympic Games
Dartchery
Bronze medal – third place	1960 Rome	Mixed Pairs Open
Wheelchair basketball
Gold medal – first place	1960 Rome	Men's Tournament Class B

Wayne Henry Broeren (2 March 1933 – 26 March 1991) from Champaign, Illinois, was a United States Paralympic athlete. In the 1960 Summer Paralympics, he competed in multiple sports including dartchery and wheelchair basketball.

In the 1960, he was a member of the winning United States wheelchair basketball team and one half of the pair that won the mixed dartchery, along with Jack Whitman.

In 2004 he was posthumously honoured with a letter by his alma mater, the University of Illinois at Urbana–Champaign.

== Personal life ==
Wayne married Cecil Marie Creath. They had four children: Stuart, Rachel, Timothy and Thomas.
