= Serge Bec =

French poet (1933–2021)

- Born: August 27, 1933; Cavaillon, France
- Died: February 27, 2021 (aged 87); Apt, France
- Occupation: Poet

Serge Bec (August 27, 1933 – February 27, 2021) was a French poet, journalist, writer, and art critic.

== Biography ==
Bec was born in Cavaillon and spent his childhood in Apt at the family flour mill. He attended Aix-Marseille University and the École supérieure de journalisme. After he completed his military service in Algeria, he became a journalist and art critic for Agence France-Presse. He served as Deputy Mayor of Culture of Apt from 1977 to 1983, and subsequently became director of the Luberon Regional Nature Park. In 1977, he became Editor-in-Chief of the journal Le Pays d’Apt. In 2009, he became Majoral of Félibrige.

Serge Bec died in Apt on February 27, 2021, at the age of 88.

== Works ==
=== Poetry ===
- Li Graio negro / Les Corneilles noires (1954)
- Cants de l'estre fòu / Chants de l'être fou (1957)
- Miegterrana / Méditerranée (1957)
- Memòria de la carn, seguit de Auba / Mémoire de la chair, suivi de Aube (1960)
- Auceus de l'ivern / Oiseaux de l'hiver (1960)
- Galina blanca e marrit can / Poule blanche et chien méchant (1968)
- Balada per Lili Fòng / Ballade pour Lilly Phong (1969)
- Cronicas dau rèire-jorn / Chroniques à contre-jour (1978)
- Sièu un païs / Je suis un Pays (1980)
- Cants de nòstrei pòbles encabestrats / Chants de nos peuples enchevêtrés (1985)
- Pouèmo de la Clarenciero I / Poèmes de la Clarencière (I) (1989)
- Sesoun de guerro / Saison de guerre (1991)
- Tres balado / Trois ballades (1993)
- La nuech fendasclada / La nuit pourfendue (1994)
- Entre Gascogne et Provence – Itinéraire en lettres d'Oc (1994)
- Pouèmo de la Clarenciero II / Poèmes de la Clarencière (II) (1998)
- Suito pèr uno eternita / Suite pour une éternité (2002)
- Saume dins lo vènt / Psaume dans le vent (2006)
- Femna mon Amor / Femme mon Amour (2008)

=== Novels ===
- Repérages érotiques (1982)
- Mémé, je ne veux pas que tu meures (1989)
- L'otage des loups (1997)
- Cagole (2001)
- La malédiction d'Hadès (2005)

=== Photographic Books ===
- Un village de Provence: Murs (1993)
- Fêtes de Provence (1994)
- Provence plurielle et singulière (1996)
- Villages en Provence (1998)
- Provence des lavandes (2001)

=== Guidebooks to Provence ===
- Mini-guide des peintres du soleil (1969)
- Mini-guide poétique du Luberon (1969)
- Almanach des plaisirs du Luberon (1979)
- Fantastique Pays d'Apt (1979)
- Votre guide en Luberon (1986)
- Le Luberon et sa région (1992)
- Carnets d'un naturaliste amateur en Luberon (1997)

== Songs and Recordings ==
Bec's poems were adapted into songs by René Sette. He also recorded his poems for Trésors d'Occitanie.

== Awards ==
- Grand Prix littéraire de Provence (2006)
- "Jour de Serge Bec" at the University of Montpellier (April 2009)
- Co-Sponsor of the Médiathèque d'Apt (2010)
