= Aroldo Ruschioni =

Italian Paralympic swimmer

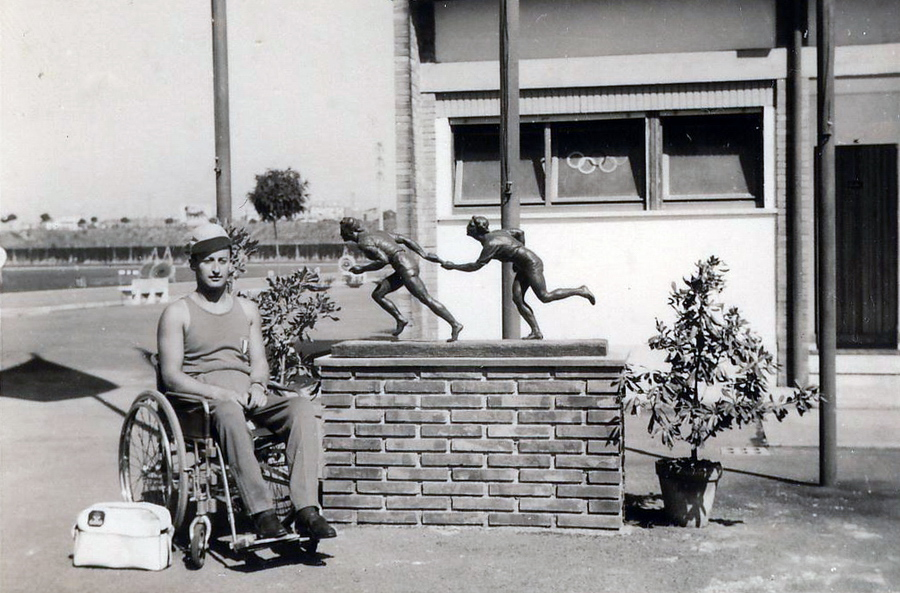
- Ruschioni at Roma 1960 paralympic village.

Personal information
- National team: Italy
- Born: 1932 (age 93–94) Macerata, Italy

Sport
- Sport: Para snooker; Para swimming; Para table tennis; Wheelchair fencing
Medal record
Event	1st	2nd	3rd
Paralympic Games	1	1	4

Aroldo Ruschioni (born 1932) was an Italian paralympic multi-sport athlete who won six medals at the Summer Paralympics.

== See also ==
- Italy at the 1960 Summer Paralympics
- Italy at the 1968 Summer Paralympics
- Italy at the 1972 Summer Paralympics
