= Paul Sones =

American Paralympic athlete (1936–2015)

Personal information
- Full name: Paul Dorrance Sones
- Nationality: American
- Born: April 27, 1936 Muncy, Pennsylvania, U.S.
- Died: May 3, 2015 (aged 79) West Roxbury, Boston, Massachusetts, U.S.

Sport
- Sport: Archery; swimming; wheelchair basketball
Medal record
Representing United States
Paralympic Games

Paul Dorrance Sones (April 27, 1936 – May 3, 2015) was an American Paralympic athlete. In the first 1960 Summer Paralympics, he competed and medaled in multiple sports, including archery, swimming and wheelchair basketball.
