= Camille Trouverie =

French paralympic archer

Personal information
- Born: 13 November 1929 Saint-Aubin-des-Bois, Calvados, France
- Died: 23 February 1972 (aged 42)

Sport
- Country: France
- Sport: Archery
Medal record
Representing France
Paralympic Games
Archery
Gold medal – first place	1960 Rome	Columbia round open
Bronze medal – third place	1968 Tel Aviv	Albion round team open

Camille Trouverie (13 November 1929 – 23 February 1972) was a French paralympic archer. He competed at the 1960 and 1968 Summer Paralympics.

== Biography ==
Trouverie competed at the 1960 Summer Paralympics, winning the gold medal in the men's Columbia round open event, scoring 550 points. He also competed at the 1968 Summer Paralympics, finishing seventh place in the men's albion round open event, but won the bronze medal in the men's albion round team open event along with David and Ventadour. He also competed in the men's FITA round open event, finishing 19th place.
