= Archery at the 1960 Summer Paralympics =

Archery at the I Paralympic Games
- Paralympic Archery
- Competitors: 19 from 8 nations

Archery at the 1960 Summer Paralympics consisted of eight archery events, four for men and four for women.

== Medal table ==
Rank	Nation	Gold	Silver	Bronze	Total
1	United States (USA)	2	0	1	3
2	Rhodesia (RHO)	2	0	0	2
3	Great Britain (GBR)	1	4	5	10
4	France (FRA)	1	2	0	3
5	Australia (AUS)	1	1	0	2
6	Ireland (IRL)	1	0	0	1
7	Belgium (BEL)	0	1	1	2
8	West Germany (FRG)	0	0	1	1
Totals (8 entries)		8	8	8	24

=== Participating nations ===
- Australia (2)
- Belgium (2)
- France (3)
- Great Britain (7)
- Ireland (1)
- Rhodesia (1)
- West Germany (1)
- United States (2)

== Medal summary ==
Event	Gold	Silver	Bronze
Men's Columbia round open	Camille Trouverie; France	Delapietra; France	Carl Hepple; Great Britain
Men's FITA round open	Jack Whitman; United States	Cliff Bradley; Great Britain	Tony Potter; Great Britain
Men's St. Nicholas round open	Ross Sutton; Australia	Gérard Figoni; France	Paul Sones; United States
Men's Windsor round open	Jack Whitman; United States	Cliff Bradley; Great Britain	van Puymbroeck; Belgium
Women's Columbia round open	Margaret Maughan; Great Britain	Marc de Vos; Belgium	Diana Gubbin; Great Britain
Women's FITA round open	Margaret Harriman; Rhodesia	Kathleen Comley; Great Britain	Robin Irvine; Great Britain
Women's St. Nicholas round open	Joan Horan; Ireland	Daphne Ceeney; Australia	Christa Zander; West Germany
Women's Windsor round open	Margaret Harriman; Rhodesia	Robin Irvine; Great Britain	Kathleen Comley; Great Britain
