= Germano Zanarotto =

Italian wheelchair fencer

Sport
- Country: Italy
- Sport: Wheelchair fencing
Medal record
Event	1st	2nd	3rd
Paralympic Games	3	1	0

Germano Zanarotto was an Italian wheelchair fencer who won four medals at the Summer Paralympics.

== See also ==
- Italy at the 1968 Summer Paralympics
- Italy at the 1972 Summer Paralympics
