= Maria Scutti =

Italian Paralympic athlete

Personal information
- Nickname: Golden women
- Nationality: Italian
- Born: August 1928 Altino, Italy
- Died: 2005 (aged 76–77)

Sport
- Country: Italy
- Sport: Paralympic athletics Paralympic swimming Wheelchair fencing Para table tennis
- Retired: 1962
Medal record
Event / 1st / 2nd / 3rd; Paralympic Games / 10 / 3 / 2
Paralympic Games
Athletics
| Gold medal – first place | 1960 Rome | Club Throw A |
| Gold medal – first place | 1960 Rome | Club Throw B |
| Gold medal – first place | 1960 Rome | Javelin A |
| Gold medal – first place | 1960 Rome | Javelin B |
| Gold medal – first place | 1960 Rome | Precision Javelin A |
| Gold medal – first place | 1960 Rome | Precision Javelin B |
| Gold medal – first place | 1960 Rome | Precision Javelin C |
| Gold medal – first place | 1960 Rome | Shot Put A |
| Gold medal – first place | 1960 Rome | Shot Put B |
| Bronze medal – third place | 1960 Rome | Club Throw C |
| Bronze medal – third place | 1960 Rome | Javelin C |
Swimming
| Gold medal – first place | 1960 Rome | 50 m Breaststroke C4 |
| Silver medal – second place | 1960 Rome | 50 m Backstroke C4 |
Fencing
| Silver medal – second place | 1960 Rome | Foil Individual |
Table tennis
| Silver medal – second place | 1960 Rome | Doubles B |

Maria Scutti (August 1928 - 2005) was an Italian paralympic athlete who won 15 medals, ten of which were gold, at the 1960 Summer Paralympics in Rome.

Nicknamed the "golden woman" (donna d'oro) thanks to these successes, Maria Scutti is the athlete who got the highest number of medals in a single edition of the Paralympic Games (in four different sports), and the second Italian athlete for total number of medals won, behind Roberto Marson (26 medals in 4 editions).

== Biography ==
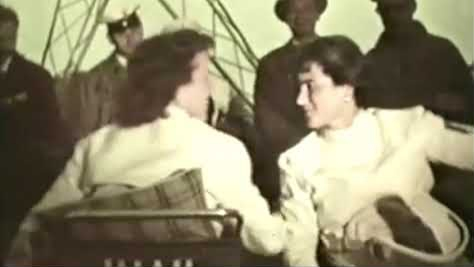
Scutti at Paralympic foil competition in Rome 1960

Maria Scutti was born in August 1928 in Altino, in the province of Chieti, Abruzzo, Italy. Married and mother of two children, in 1957, at the age of 29, she lost the use of her legs following a road accident while driving a motorcycle-van. During her rehabilitation after hospitalization at the center for paraplegics in Ostia, she discovered a passion for sports and in 1958 began to compete in many disciplines.

Scutti competed in the 1960 Summer Paralympics in her home country, Italy. She entered eleven throwing events in athletics, winning nine of them and coming third in the remaining two. She won a gold in swimming for the 50 m breaststroke as well as a silver in the 50 m backstroke. Scutti also won silver medals in both wheelchair fencing and table tennis. These accomplishments mean that Scutti is one of the most successful Paralympians at a single Games.

Ended the sporting career in 1962 with budget of 22 gold medals, 9 silver medals, and 2 bronze medals, Scutti died in 2005 at the age of 77 years old.

== See also ==
- Italy at the 1960 Summer Paralympics
- List of multiple Paralympic gold medalists at a single Games
- Italy at the Paralympics - Multiple medallists
