= Giovanni Ferraris =

Italian para table tennis player and wheelchair fencer

Sport
- Country: Italy
- Sport: Para table tennis Wheelchair fencing
Medal record
Paralympic Games
Gold medal – first place	1960 Rome	Doubles B
Gold medal – first place	1960 Rome	Team sabre
Gold medal – first place	1964 Tokyo	Doubles B
Gold medal – first place	1968 Tel Avivi	Team foil
Silver medal – second place	1960 Rome	Doubles C
Silver medal – second place	1968 Tel Aviv	Team sabre
Silver medal – second place	1972 Heidelberg	Team sabre
Silver medal – second place	1972 Heidelberg	Teams C3
Bronze medal – third place	1960 Rome	Open
Bronze medal – third place	1960 Rome	Individual sabre
Bronze medal – third place	1968 Tel Aviv	Singles C3
Bronze medal – third place	1968 Tel Aviv	Doubles B
Bronze medal – third place	1976 Toronto	Team foil

Giovanni Ferraris was an Italian paralympic table tennis player and wheelchair fencer who won thirteen medals, in three different sports and five different editions, at the Summer Paralympics.

== See also ==
- Italian multiple medallists at the Summer Paralympics
