= Vittorio Loi =

Italian Paralympic wheelchair fencer

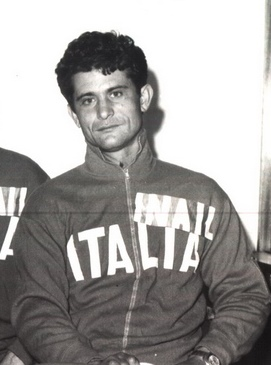

Personal information
- National team: Italy
- Born: 22 November 1942 Nuoro, Italy
- Died: 14 October 2015 (aged 72) Rome, Italy

Sport
- Sport: Wheelchair fencing
Medal record
Event	1st	2nd	3rd
Paralympic Games	3	4	3

Vittorio Loi (22 November 1942 - 14 October 2015) was an Italian wheelchair fencer who won ten medals at the Summer Paralympics.

== Career ==
He won the Wheelchair Fencing World Championships for thirteen consecutive years from 1962 to 1974. He was a founding member of the Italian Federation of Sports for the Disabled (Federazione Italiana Sport Disabili, FISD) today the Italian Paralympic Committee (Comitato Italiano Paralimpico, IPC) and at International level was vice-president of International Wheelchair and Amputee Sports Federation (IWASF) until 2013.

== See also ==
- Italian multiple medallists at the Summer Paralympics
