= Roberto Marson =

Italian Paralympic athlete (1944–2011)

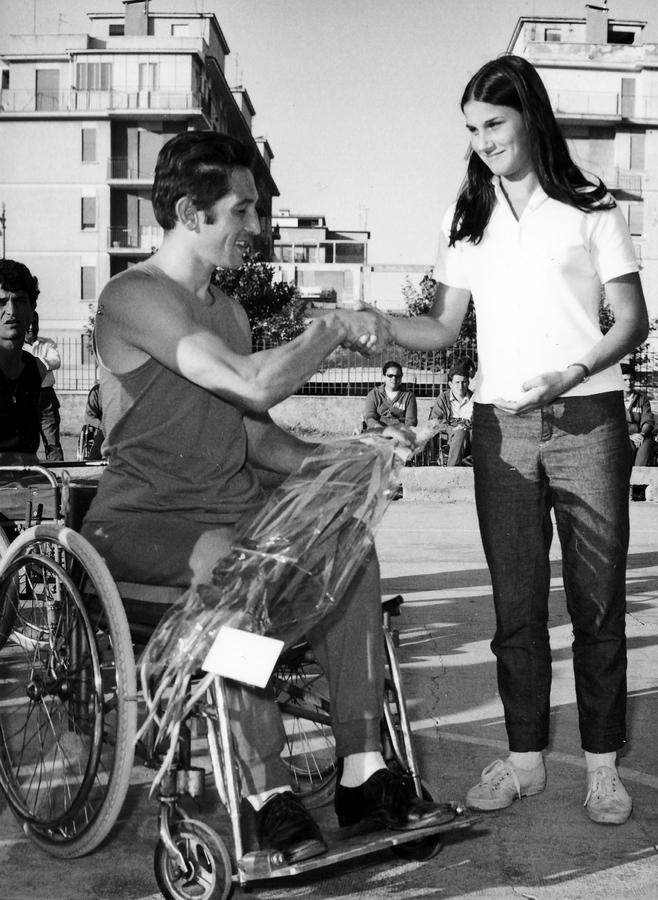

Personal information
- Nationality: Italian
- Born: 29 June 1944 Pasiano di Pordenone, Italy
- Died: 7 November 2011 (aged 67) Rome, Italy

Sport
- Country: Italy
- Sport: Paralympic athletics Paralympic swimming Wheelchair basket Wheelchair fencing
- Retired: 1982
Medal record
Event / 1st / 2nd / 3rd; Paralympic Games / 16 / 7 / 3
Paralympic Games
Athletics
Gold medal – first place	1964 Tokyo	Discus throw C
Gold medal – first place	1964 Tokyo	Javelin throw C
Gold medal – first place	1968 Tel Aviv	Discus throw D
Gold medal – first place	1968 Tel Aviv	Javelin throw D
Gold medal – first place	1968 Tel Aviv	Club throw D
Silver medal – second place	1964 Tokyo	Club throw C
Silver medal – second place	1964 Tokyo	Slalom open
Bronze medal – third place	1968 Tel Aviv	Shot put D
Swimming
Gold medal – first place	1968 Tel Aviv	50 m freestyle class 5
Gold medal – first place	1968 Tel Aviv	50 m backstroke class 5
Gold medal – first place	1968 Tel Aviv	50 m breaststroke class 5
Fencing
Gold medal – first place	1964 Tokyo	Épée team
Gold medal – first place	1968 Tel Aviv	Épée individual
Gold medal – first place	1968 Tel Aviv	Foil individual
Gold medal – first place	1968 Tel Aviv	Sabre individual
Gold medal – first place	1968 Tel Aviv	Foil team
Gold medal – first place	1972 Heidelberg	Épée individual
Gold medal – first place	1972 Heidelberg	Sabre individual
Gold medal – first place	1972 Heidelberg	Épée team
Silver medal – second place	1964 Tokyo	Épée individual
Silver medal – second place	1964 Tokyo	Sabre individual
Silver medal – second place	1968 Tel Aviv	Épée team
Silver medal – second place	1968 Tel Aviv	Sabre team
Silver medal – second place	1972 Heidelberg	Sabre team
Bronze medal – third place	1964 Tokyo	Sabre team
Bronze medal – third place	1976 Toronto	Épée team

Roberto Marson (29 June 1944 – 7 November 2011) was an Italian multisport athlete who competed at the Summer Paralympics on four occasions and won a total of 26 Paralympic medals. He lost the use of his legs when a pine tree he was chopping down fell on his back.

He is included in Visa Paralympic Hall of Fame of the International Paralympic Committee.

== Biography ==
Marson made his first Paralympic appearance, representing Italy, in the second ever Games in Tokyo, Japan, in 1964. He competed in three different sports: athletics, wheelchair fencing and swimming. In athletics he won two gold medals and two silver medals, setting a new world record of 24.20 metres in the men's javelin C classification. He finished fourth in both of the freestyle swimming events in which he competed. In the individual fencing events Marson won silver in épée and sabre, but alongside compatriots Franco Rossi and Renzo Rogo he won a team épée gold medal and a team sabre bronze medal.

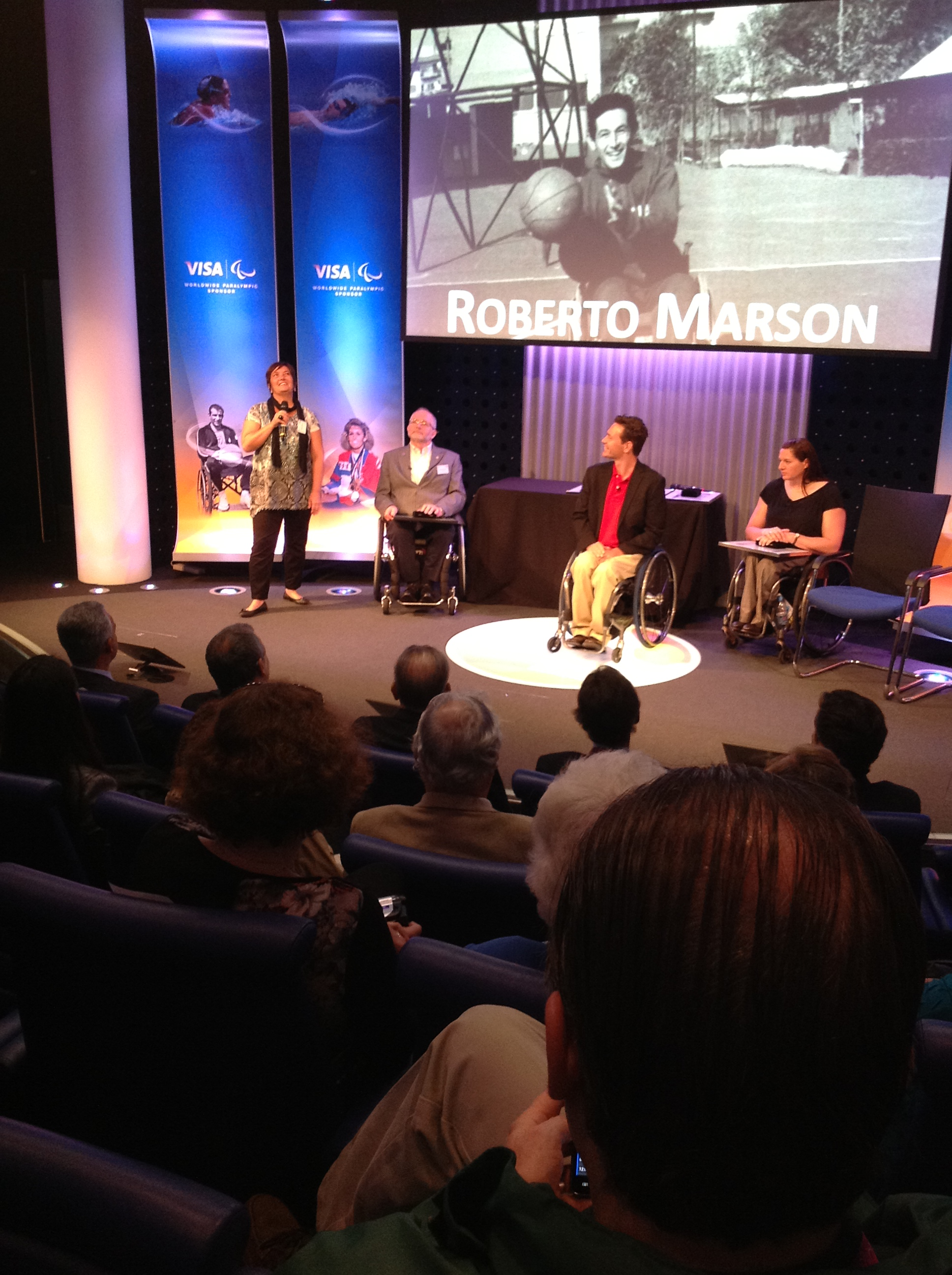
On 30 August 2012 in London during Summer Paralympics, Marson's daughter received the award Visa Paralympic Hall of Fame.

At the 1968 Summer Paralympics held in Tel Aviv, Israel, Marson was proclaimed the outstanding athlete of the Games after winning ten gold medals; three in athletics field events, three in swimming and four in wheelchair fencing. His swimming golds all came on the same day as he won the 50 metres events for freestyle, breaststroke and backstroke. In wheelchair fencing he won individual gold for épée, foil and sabre. He was joined by Giovanni Ferraris, Vittorio Loi, Franco Rossi and Germano Zanarotto to defeat France 5–4 in the final and win gold for Italy in the team foil. With Ferraris and Zanarotto he won a silver in team sabre and also won silver in the team épée alongside Loi and Rossi. He successfully defended the Paralympic javelin and discus titles that he had won in Tokyo and added a third athletics gold medal in the club throw and a bronze in the shot put.

In 1972 at the Paralympics in Heidelberg, Marson contested a single athletics event and four wheelchair fencing events. He finished fourth in the men's discus 4 event with the gold being won by Canadian Eugene Reimer. In the individual épée, individual sabre and team épée events he retained his Paralympic titles, but his Italian team was beaten to the gold medal in the team sabre by Great Britain.

Marson's final Paralympic Games came in 1976 in Toronto, Canada. He failed to win medals in either of his athletic events or the individual wheelchair fencing events, but did take a bronze medal in the men's team épée. He was President of Federazione Italiana Sport Handicappati from 1980 until 1990. He died in 2011 and in 2012 he was inducted into the International Paralympian Hall of Fame. On 14 May 2021, Jovian asteroid 39795 Marson, discovered by astronomers at Spacewatch in 1997, was named in his memory.

== See also ==
- List of multiple Paralympic gold medalists
- List of multiple Paralympic gold medalists at a single Games
- IPC inducts new members into its Hall of Fame
- Italy at the Paralympics - Multiple medallists
