= Franco Rossi (parathlete) =

Italian Paralympic athlete (1934–2001)

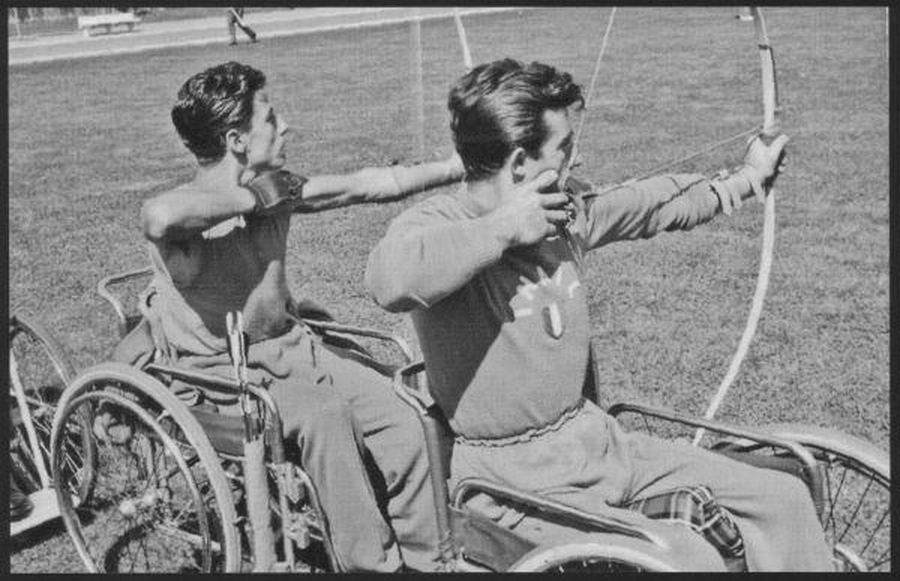
- Franco Rossi and Ottavio Moscone at Rome 1960

Personal information
- Nationality: Italian
- Born: 18 May 1934 (age 92) Narni, Italy
- Died: 2001

Sport
- Country: Italy
- Sport: Paralympic swimming Wheelchair fencing Para table tennis Para archery
Medal record
Representing Italy
Event / 1st / 2nd / 3rd; Paralympic Games / 6 / 3 / 4
Swimming
Paralympic Games
Gold medal – first place	1960 Rome	50 m breaststroke 5
Bronze medal – third place	1960 Rome	50 m crawl 5
Bronze medal – third place	1964 Tokyo	50 m freestyle prone
Table tennis
Paralympic Games
Gold medal – first place	1960 Rome	Doubles C
Fencing
Paralympic Games
Gold medal – first place	1964 Tokyo	Épée team
Gold medal – first place	1968 Tel Aviv	Foil team
Gold medal – first place	1972 Heidelberg	Épée team
Gold medal – first place	1972 Heidelberg	Foil team
Silver medal – second place	1960 Rome	Sabre individual
Silver medal – second place	1968 Tel Aviv	Épée team
Silver medal – second place	1972 Heidelberg	Foil individual
Bronze medal – third place	1960 Rome	Sabre team
Bronze medal – third place	1964 Tokyo	Sabre team

Franco Rossi was a former Italian paralympic athlete, who won 13 medals (6 gold) in four editions of the Summer Paralympics (from 1960 to 1972).

== See also ==
- Italy at the Paralympics – Multiple medallists
