= 1964 Summer Paralympics medal table =

1964 Summer Paralympics medals
- Location: Tokyo Japan

Highlights
- Most gold medals: United States (50)
- Most total medals: United States (123)
- Medalling NPCs: 17

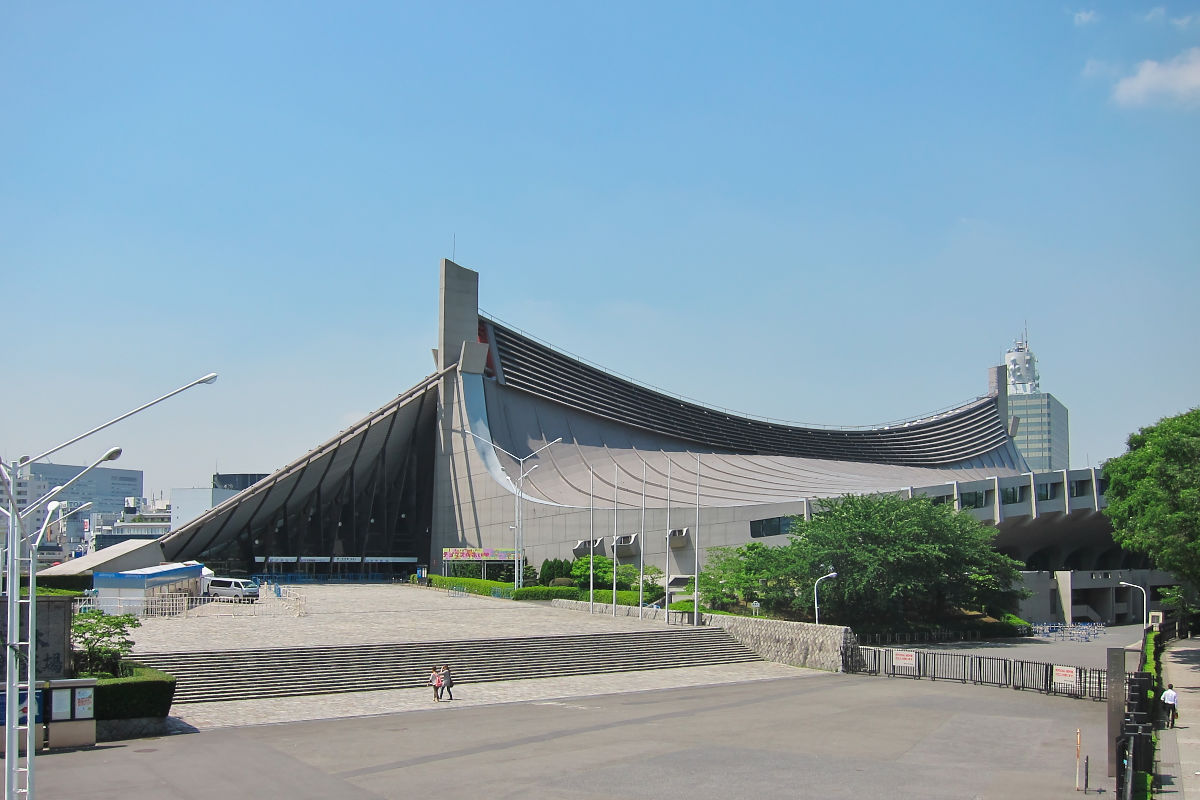
Yoyogi National Gymnasium hosted the closing ceremony of the Games.

The 13th International Stoke Mandeville Games, later known as the 1964 Summer Paralympics, was an international multi-sport event held in Tokyo, Japan, from November 3 to 12, 1964, in which paraplegic and tetraplegic athletes competed against one another. The Stoke Mandeville Games were a forerunner to the Paralympics first organized by Sir Ludwig Guttmann in 1948. This medal table ranks the competing National Paralympic Committees (NPCs) by the number of gold medals won by their athletes.

A total of 418 medals were awarded in 9 sports. Athletes from 17 of the 19 competing NPCs won at least one medal with the United States taking both the most gold medals, with 50, and most in total, with 123. The host nation Japan won 10 medals at the Games: 1 gold, 5 silver and 4 bronze. The debuting NPCs included Japan, South Africa, Sweden and Fiji. South Africa, despite being banned from the Olympics, was present at the 1964 Paralympics.

Athletes with outstanding performances included Margaret Harriman of Rhodesia who won two gold medals in archery, and Serge Bec of France who won two individuals gold medals, one team gold medal and one team silver medal. Dick Thompson of the United Kingdom won two individual golds, one silver and one bronze in athletics. The United States' Ron Stein won six golds and South Africa's Daniel Erasmus won two golds and two silvers in athletics.

== Medal table ==
The ranking in this table is based on information provided by the International Paralympic Committee (IPC) and is consistent with IPC convention in its published medal tables. By default, the table is ordered by the number of gold medals the athletes from a nation have won (in this context, a "nation" is an entity represented by a National Paralympic Committee). The number of silver medals is taken into consideration next and then the number of bronze medals. If nations are still tied, equal ranking is given and they are listed alphabetically by IPC country code.

With a few exceptions, each event contributed one medal of each type to the table (although for team events, multiple physical medals were actually awarded). Two bronze medals were awarded in the dartchery, snooker and table tennis events. Some swimming events did not award silver or bronze medals.

The US dominated the medal standings. Great Britain finished second, followed by Italy, Australia and Rhodesia.

- To sort this table by nation, total medal count, or any other column, click on the icon next to the column title.

* Host nation (Japan)

Rank	NPC	Gold	Silver	Bronze	Total
1	United States	50	41	32	123
2	Great Britain	18	23	20	61
3	Italy	14	15	16	45
4	Australia	12	11	7	30
5	Rhodesia	10	5	2	17
6	South Africa	8	8	3	19
7	Israel	7	3	11	21
8	Argentina	6	15	16	37
9	West Germany	5	2	5	12
10	Netherlands	4	6	4	14
11	France	4	2	5	11
12	Austria	4	1	7	12
13	Japan*	1	5	4	10
14	Belgium	1	0	2	3
15	Switzerland	0	1	0	1
16	Malta	0	0	2	2
17	Sweden	0	0	1	1
Totals (17 entries)		144	138	137	419

== See also ==
- 1964 Summer Olympics medal table
- 2020 Summer Olympics medal table
- 2020 Summer Paralympics medal table
