= Albion round open medalists =

Albion round open events were held between 1964 and 1968, both men and women competed.

== Men's Albion round open ==
| Event | Gold | Silver | Bronze |
|---|---|---|---|
| 1964 Tokyo | Dean Slaugh; United States | Peter Blanker; Netherlands | Raymond Schelfaut; Belgium |
| 1968 Tel Aviv | Tony South; Australia | Popke Popkema; Netherlands | Klemens; United States |

== Men's Albion round team open ==
| Event | Gold | Silver | Bronze |
|---|---|---|---|
| 1964 Tokyo | United States (USA) | Japan (JPN) | None |
| 1968 Tel Aviv | United States (USA) | Great Britain (GBR) | France (FRA) |

== Women's Albion round open ==
| Event | Gold | Silver | Bronze |
|---|---|---|---|
| 1964 Tokyo | Margaret Harriman; Rhodesia | Valerie Forder; Great Britain | Daphne Ceeney; Australia |
| 1968 Tel Aviv | Margaret Harriman; South Africa | Webb; United States | Arlette Keller; Switzerland |
