= Swimming at the 1964 Summer Paralympics =

Swimming at the II Paralympic Games
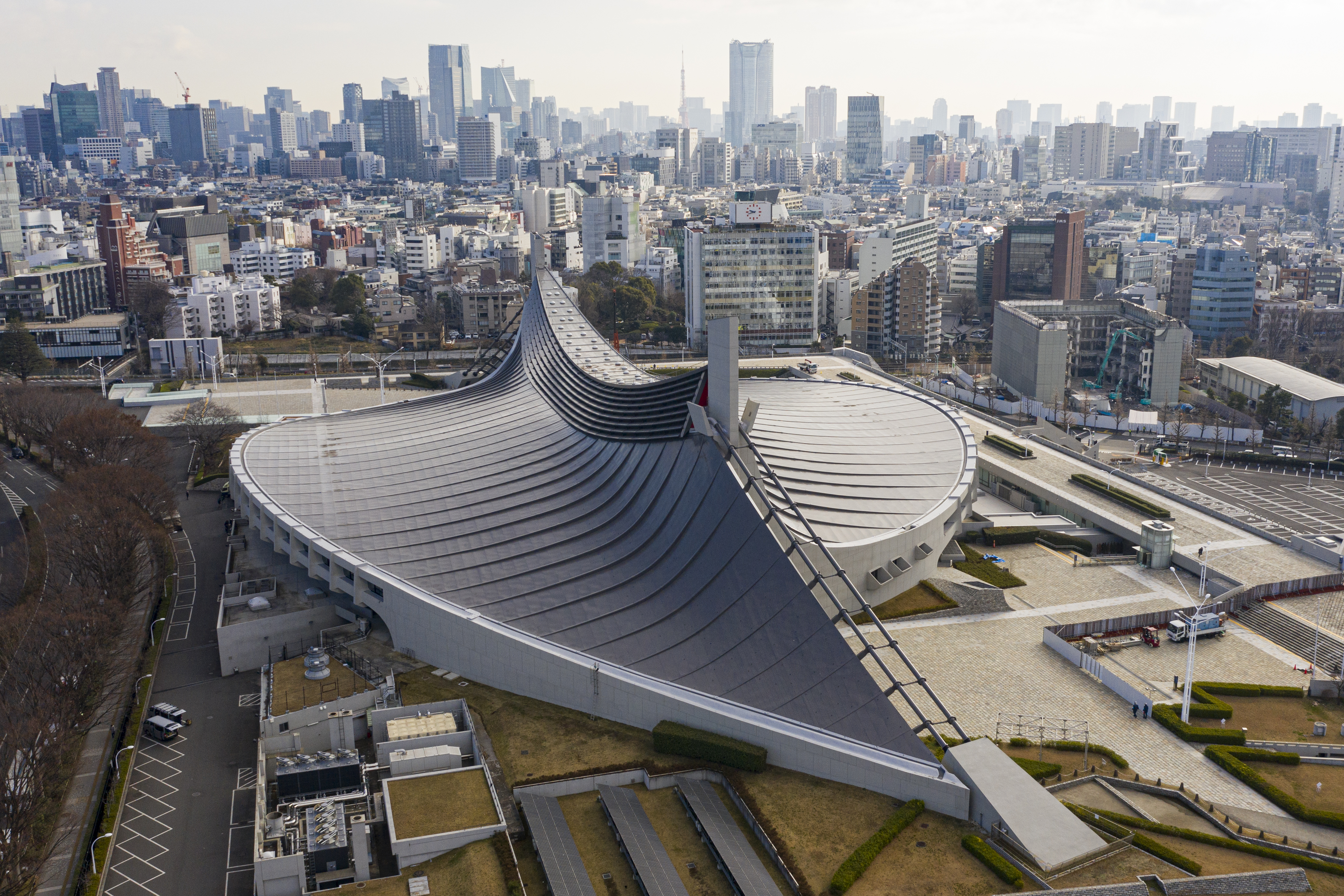

Swimming at the 1964 Summer Paralympics consisted of 62 events, 31 for men, 30 for women and 1 mixed.

== The wrong reports ==
Since at the dawn of the Paralympic Games there was no precision in reporting the results of the competitions, the Israeli athlete Michal Escapa was indicated with the Italian nationality and without prename (and so she is mentioned in the International Paralympic Committee of the Italian Paralympic Committee web sites) for the reports of the Swimming at the 1964 Summer Paralympics where she won two bronze medals, simply reported as Escapa and not as Michal Escapa. However, as can be seen from a 1968 Israeli newspaper reporting an interview with the athlete, she was the same athlete who had won medals in swimming and table tennis in Tokyo 1964.

== Participating nations ==
- Argentina (8)
- Australia (8)
- Austria (4)
- France (1)
- Great Britain (13)
- Israel (5)
- Italy (14)
- Japan (6)
- Netherlands (4)
- Rhodesia (3)
- South Africa (3)
- West Germany (4)
- United States (25)

== Results ==
=== Men's events ===
Event	Gold	Silver	Bronze
25 m freestyle prone complete class 1	Roy Fowler; Australia	Vincent Falardeau; United States	Stefan Florescu; United States
25 m freestyle prone complete class 2	David Ellis; Great Britain	Francesco Deiana; Italy	W. Brenken; West Germany
25 m freestyle prone incomplete class 1	R. Rosenbaum; United States	Samuel Goldstein; United States	Stan Miles; Great Britain
25 m freestyle prone incomplete class 2	Sedlacek; West Germany	Helvio Aresca; Argentina	Renzo Rogo; Italy
50 m freestyle prone cauda equina	Phil Ramsey; United States	Dik Kruidenier; Netherlands	Franco Rossi; Italy
50 m freestyle prone complete class 3	K. H. Sass; West Germany	Heinz Simon; West Germany	Giovanni Pische; Italy
50 m freestyle prone complete class 4	G. Conn; United States	Leslie Manson-Bishop; Rhodesia	Setsumi Makioka; Japan
50 m freestyle prone incomplete class 3	H. Burkett; United States	G. Williams; Great Britain	Michael Dow; Australia
50 m freestyle prone incomplete class 4	Juan Sznitowski; Argentina	Jorge Diz; Argentina	Ed Owen; United States
50 m freestyle prone special class	Cor Prins; Netherlands	P. Newman; Great Britain	Avraham Keftelovitch; Israel
25 m freestyle supine complete class 1	Roy Fowler; Australia	Vincent Falardeau; United States	Stefan Florescu; United States
25 m freestyle supine complete class 2	David Ellis; Great Britain	Trevor French; Australia	Francesco Deiana; Italy
25 m freestyle supine complete class 2	Frank Ponta; Australia	Trevor French; Australia	Francesco Deiana; Italy
25 m freestyle supine incomplete class 1	R. Rosenbaum; United States	Samuel Goldstein; United States	Stan Miles; Great Britain
25 m freestyle supine incomplete class 2	Renzo Rogo; Italy	Sedlacek; West Germany	Helvio Aresca; Argentina
50 m freestyle supine complete class 3	Gary Schoep; United States	W. Thornton; Great Britain	W. Johnson; United States
50 m freestyle supine complete class 4	Leslie Manson-Bishop; Rhodesia	G. Conn; United States	B. Dickinson; Great Britain
50 m freestyle supine complete class 5	Phil Ramsey; United States	Shigeo Aono; Japan	Silvio Boscu; Italy
50 m freestyle supine incomplete class 3	Michael Dow; Australia	H. Burkett; United States	Dante Tosi; Argentina
50 m freestyle supine incomplete class 4	Ed Owen; United States	Tim Harris; United States	Juan Sznitowski; Argentina
50 m freestyle supine special class	Cor Prins; Netherlands	Germano Pecchenino; Italy	L. Halford; Great Britain
25 m breaststroke junior class	Jacob Ben-Arie; Israel	None	None
25 m breaststroke complete class 1	Roy Fowler; Australia	Stefan Florescu; United States	Vincent Falardeau; United States
25 m breaststroke complete class 2	Francesco Deiana; Italy	David Ellis; Great Britain	Josef Jager; Austria
25 m breaststroke incomplete class 1	R. Rosenbaum; United States	S. Miles; Great Britain	Samuel Goldstein; United States
25 m breaststroke incomplete class 2	Renzo Rogo; Italy	Oliver Venturi; Italy	None
50 m breaststroke complete class 3	W. Thornton; Great Britain	W. Johnson; United States	Gary Schoep; United States
50 m breaststroke complete class 4	Leslie Manson-Bishop; Rhodesia	B. Dickinson; Great Britain	G. Conn; United States
50 m breaststroke complete class 5	Phil Ramsey; United States	Ignesias; Argentina	Dik Kruidenier; Netherlands
50 m breaststroke incomplete class 3	Michael Dow; Australia	H. Burkett; United States	Aimé Planchon; France
50 m breaststroke incomplete class 4	Ed Owen; United States	G. Popperwell; South Africa	Tim Harris; United States
50 m breaststroke special class	Baruch Hagai; Israel	Avraham Keftelovitch; Israel	Germano Pecchenino; Italy

=== Women's events ===
Event	Gold	Silver	Bronze
25 m freestyle prone complete class 1	Evelyn Mulry; United States	None	None
25 m freestyle prone complete class 2	R. Kuhnel; Austria	Susan Masham; Great Britain	None
25 m freestyle prone incomplete class 1	Janet Little; United States	A. Somerset; South Africa	N. Thesen; South Africa
25 m freestyle prone incomplete class 2	S. Simmons; United States	Anna Maria Toso; Italy	Michal Escapa; Israel
50 m freestyle prone cauda equina	Batia Mishani; Israel	Zipora Rubin-Rosenbaum; Israel	None
50 m freestyle prone complete class 3	J. Slade; United States	Valerie Forder; Great Britain	I. Driessler; Austria
50 m freestyle prone complete class 4	Pauline Foulds; Great Britain	None	None
50 m freestyle prone complete class 5	Elizabeth Edmondson; Australia	Daphne Ceeney; Australia	Christa Welger; United States
50 m freestyle prone incomplete class 3	Lynnette Gilchrist; Rhodesia	Ella Cox; United States	J. Howe; United States
50 m freestyle prone incomplete class 4	Rosalie Hixson; United States	Irene Monaco; Italy	Hope Chafee; United States
50 m freestyle prone special class	Silvia Cochetti; Argentina	Estela Falocco; Argentina	Amelia Mier; Argentina
25 m freestyle supine complete class 1	Evelyn Mulry; United States	Marion de Groot; Netherlands	None
25 m freestyle supine complete class 2	R. Kuhnel; Austria	Susan Masham; Great Britain	Silvana Martino; Italy
25 m freestyle supine incomplete class 1	Janet Little; United States	A. Somerset; South Africa	Marion de Groot; Netherlands
25 m freestyle supine incomplete class 2	Anna Maria Toso; Italy	S. Simmons; United States	None
50 m freestyle supine cauda equina	Elizabeth Edmondson; Australia	Christa Welger; United States	Daphne Ceeney; Australia
50 m freestyle supine complete class 3	Valerie Forder; Great Britain	Janet Laughton; Great Britain	I. Driessler; Austria
50 m freestyle supine complete class 4	P. Foulds; Great Britain	None	None
50 m freestyle supine incomplete class 3	Lynnette Gilchrist; Rhodesia	Ella Cox; United States	J. Howe; United States
50 m freestyle supine incomplete class 4	Rosalie Hixson; United States	Hope Chafee; United States	Irene Monaco; Italy
50 m freestyle supine special class	Silvia Cochetti; Argentina	Estela Falocco; Argentina	Amelia Mier; Argentina
25 m breaststroke complete class 2	R. Kuhnel; Austria	Susan Masham; Great Britain	None
25 m breaststroke incomplete class 1	A. Somerset; South Africa	Janet Little; United States	None
25 m breaststroke incomplete class 2	S. Simmons; United States	Anna Maria Toso; Italy	Michal Escapa; Israel
50 m breaststroke cauda equina	Elizabeth Edmondson; Australia	Christa Welger; United States	M. Gibbs; Great Britain
50 m breaststroke complete class 3	Elka Gaarlandt; Netherlands	Valerie Forder; Great Britain	Janet Laughton; Great Britain
50 m breaststroke complete class 4	Pauline Foulds; Great Britain	None	None
50 m breaststroke incomplete class 3	Lynnette Gilchrist; Rhodesia	Elena Monaco; Italy	J. Howe; United States
50 m breaststroke incomplete class 4	Hope Chafee; United States	Rosalie Hixson; United States	Irene Monaco; Italy
50 m breaststroke special class	Silvia Cochetti; Argentina	Estela Falocco; Argentina	Amelia Mier; Argentina

=== Mixed events ===
Event	Gold	Silver	Bronze
Medley relay open	United States (USA); Tim Harris; Ed Owen; Phil Ramsey	Rhodesia (RHO); Lynnette Gilchrist; Leslie Manson-Bishop; Keith Pienaar	Israel (ISR); Jacob Ben-Arie; Baruch Hagai; Avraham Keftelovitch

== Medal table ==
Source and with the displacement of two bronze medals from Italy to Israel due to the Michal Escapa case documented in the first section of this article.

Rank	Nation	Gold	Silver	Bronze	Total
1	United States (USA)	22	18	14	54
2	Australia (AUS)	9	2	2	13
3	Great Britain (GBR)	7	12	6	25
4	Rhodesia (RHO)	5	2	0	7
5	Italy (ITA)	4	7	9	20
6	Argentina (ARG)	4	6	6	16
7	Israel (ISR)	3	2	4	9
8	Netherlands (NED)	3	2	2	7
9	Austria (AUT)	3	0	3	6
10	West Germany (FRG)	2	2	1	5
11	South Africa (RSA)	1	3	1	5
12	Japan (JPN)	0	1	1	2
13	France (FRA)	0	0	1	1
Totals (13 entries)		63	57	50	170
