= Athletics at the 1964 Summer Paralympics =

Athletics at the II Paralympic Games
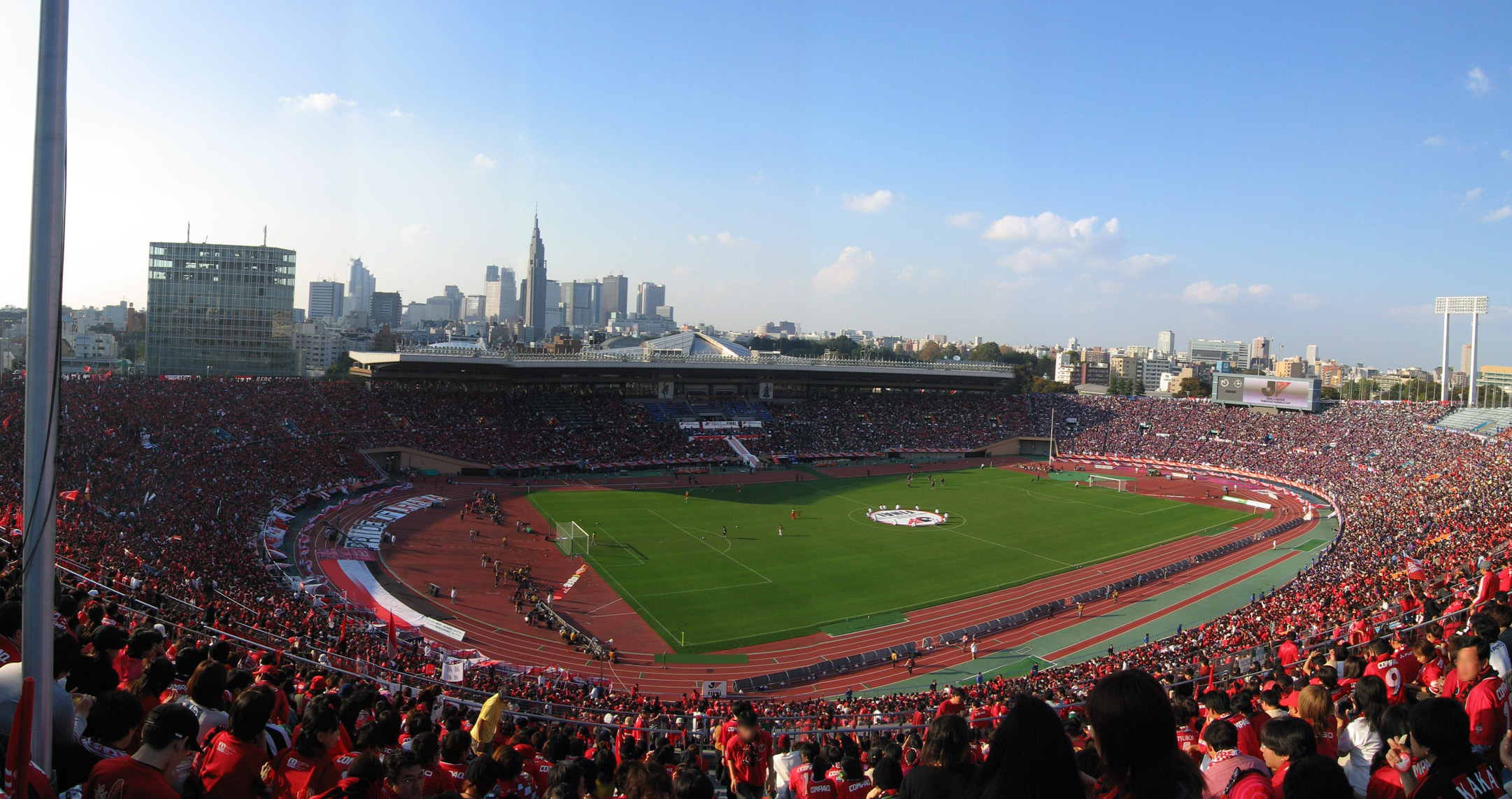
- Host stadium (shown in 2004)
- Dates: 8–12 November 1964
- Competitors: 82 from 15 nations

Athletics at the 1964 Summer Paralympics consisted of 42 events, 24 for men and 18 for women.

== Participating nations ==
- Argentina (9)
- Australia (4)
- Austria (6)
- France (1)
- Great Britain (11)
- Ireland (1)
- Israel (4)
- Italy (7)
- Japan (1)
- Malta (1)
- Netherlands (3)
- Rhodesia (3)
- South Africa (3)
- United States (24)
- West Germany (4)

== Medal table ==
Rank	Nation	Gold	Silver	Bronze	Total
1	United States (USA)	18	18	12	48
2	Italy (ITA)	6	4	2	12
3	South Africa (RSA)	4	4	2	10
4	Great Britain (GBR)	4	2	6	12
5	West Germany (FRG)	3	0	2	5
6	Rhodesia (RHO)	2	3	2	7
7	Australia (AUS)	2	3	0	5
8	Israel (ISR)	2	0	3	5
9	Argentina (ARG)	1	6	9	16
10	Netherlands (NED)	0	1	1	2
11	Austria (AUT)	0	1	0	1
12	France (FRA)	0	0	1	1
Totals (12 entries)		42	42	40	124

== Medal summary ==
=== Men's events ===
Event	Gold	Silver	Bronze
Wheelchair dash above T10	Gary Hooper; Australia	Don Kennedy; United States	Dick Thompson; Great Britain
Wheelchair dash below T10	Ron Stein; United States	Tim Harris; United States	Richard Miller; United States
Wheelchair relay above T10	United States (USA)	Australia (AUS)	None
Wheelchair relay below T10	United States (USA)	Argentina (ARG)	None
Club throw A	Dick Thompson; Great Britain	Daniel Erasmus; South Africa	Frank Vecera; United States
Club throw B	Walter Prossl; West Germany	D. Pickering; Great Britain	Borghese; Italy
Club throw C	H. Smith; United States	Roberto Marson; Italy	Ralph Rowe; Great Britain
Club throw D	Ron Stein; United States	Jorge Diz; Argentina	Tim Harris; United States
Discus throw A	Daniel Erasmus; South Africa	C. Sandglass; United States	Frank Vecera; United States
Discus throw B	J. Meyer; South Africa	Don Kennedy; United States	Keith Pienaar; Rhodesia
Discus throw C	Roberto Marson; Italy	Richard Maduro; United States	Benincasa; Italy
Discus throw D	Ron Stein; United States	Tim Harris; United States	Alberto Ocampo; Argentina
Javelin throw A	Dick Thompson; Great Britain	Daniel Erasmus; South Africa	Frank Vecera; United States
Javelin throw B	Walter Prossl; West Germany	J. Meyer; South Africa	Don Kennedy; United States
Javelin throw C	Roberto Marson; Italy	William Fairbanks; United States	Leslie Manson-Bishop; Rhodesia
Javelin throw D	Ron Stein; United States	Jorge Diz; Argentina	Tim Harris; United States
Shot put A	Daniel Erasmus; South Africa	Dick Thompson; Great Britain	I. Rose; West Germany
Shot put B	Walter Prossl; West Germany	J. Meyer; South Africa	Don Kennedy; United States
Shot put C	Benincasa; Italy	William Fairbanks; United States	Richard Maduro; United States
Shot put D	Ron Stein; United States	Tim Harris; United States	Jorge Diz; Argentina
Slalom open	Richard Miller; United States	Roberto Marson; Italy	Jacques Biron; France
Pentathlon 1	Richard Maduro; United States	Frank Vecera; United States	Dick Thompson; Great Britain
Pentathlon 2	William Fairbanks; United States	Leslie Manson-Bishop; Rhodesia	Juan Sznitowski; Argentina
Pentathlon special class	Ron Stein; United States	Tim Harris; United States	Jorge Diz; Argentina

=== Women's events ===
Event	Gold	Silver	Bronze
Wheelchair dash below T10	Carol Bryant; Great Britain	L. Patterson; United States	Christa Welger; United States
Club throw A	Elaine Schreiber; Australia	Anna Maria Toso; Italy	Janet Laughton; Great Britain
Club throw B	Lynnette Gilchrist; Rhodesia	Susana Olarte; Argentina	Rosemary Harvey; Great Britain
Club throw C	Rosalie Hixson; United States	J. Waterman; United States	Noemi Tortul; Argentina
Club throw D	Christa Welger; United States	Patterson; United States	Sylvia Cochetti; Argentina
Discus throw A	Barressi; United States	Anna Maria Toso; Italy	Carol Giesse; United States
Discus throw B	M. Forty; South Africa	Lynnette Gilchrist; Rhodesia	Susana Olarte; Argentina
Discus throw C	Rosalie Hixson; United States	J. Waterman; United States	Valerie Forder; Great Britain
Discus throw D	Irene Monaco; Italy	Sylvia Cochetti; Argentina	Zipora Rubin-Rosenbaum; Israel
Javelin throw A	Anna Maria Toso; Italy	Elaine Schreiber; Australia	Carol Giesse; United States
Javelin throw B	Lynnette Gilchrist; Rhodesia	Susana Olarte; Argentina	M. Forty; South Africa
Javelin throw C	Rosalie Hixson; United States	Marion O'Brien; Australia	Noemi Tortul; Argentina
Javelin throw D	Batia Mishani; Israel	Christa Welger; United States	Zipora Rubin-Rosenbaum; Israel
Shot put A	Anna Maria Toso; Italy	I. Driessler; Austria	I. Strecker; West Germany
Shot put B	Susana Olarte; Argentina	Lynnette Gilchrist; Rhodesia	M. Forty; South Africa
Shot put C	Rosalie Hixson; United States	J. Waterman; United States	Noemi Tortul; Argentina
Shot put D	Zipora Rubin-Rosenbaum; Israel	Patterson; United States	Batia Mishani; Israel
Slalom open	Carol Bryant; Great Britain	Elka Gaarlandt; Netherlands	E. O'Brien; Netherlands
