= Columbia round open medalists =

Columbia round open was held between 1960 and 1968, both men and women competed.

== Men's Columbia round open ==
| Event | Gold | Silver | Bronze |
|---|---|---|---|
| 1960 Rome | Camille Trouverie; France | Delapierta; France | Jack Hepple; Great Britain |
| 1964 Tokyo | Dan Kotter; United States | Raimondo Longhi; Italy | George Pasipanki; United States |
| 1968 Tel Aviv | Alan Conn; Australia | Reno Levis; United States | Giuliano Koten; Italy |

== Men's Columbia round team open ==
| Event | Gold | Silver | Bronze |
|---|---|---|---|
| 1964 Tokyo | United States (USA) | France (FRA) | None |
| 1968 Tel Aviv | United States (USA) | West Germany (FRG) | Switzerland (SUI) |

== Women's Columbia round open ==
| Event | Gold | Silver | Bronze |
|---|---|---|---|
| 1960 Rome | Margaret Maughan; Great Britain | Marc de Vos; Belgium | Gubbin; Great Britain |
| 1964 Tokyo | B. Rosenzweig; United States | Daphne Legge-Willis; Great Britain | C. Tetley; Great Britain |
| 1968 Tel Aviv | Mireille Marraschin; France | Soulek; United States | Cornett; United States |
