= Archery at the 1964 Summer Paralympics =

Archery at the II Paralympic Games
- Paralympic Archery
- Competitors: 41 from 12 nations

Archery at the 1964 Summer Paralympics consisted of twelve events, eight for men and four for women.

== Medal table ==
Rank	Nation	Gold	Silver	Bronze	Total
1	United States (USA)	7	0	2	9
2	South Africa (RSA)	2	1	0	3
3	Rhodesia (RHO)	2	0	0	2
4	France (FRA)	1	1	1	3
5	Great Britain (GBR)	0	2	2	4
6	Australia (AUS)	0	2	1	3
7	Netherlands (NED)	0	2	0	2
8	Italy (ITA)	0	1	0	1
8	Japan (JPN)	0	1	0	1
8	Switzerland (SUI)	0	1	0	1
11	Belgium (BEL)	0	0	1	1
11	Sweden (SWE)	0	0	1	1
Totals (12 entries)		12	11	8	31

=== Participating nations ===
- Australia (4)
- Belgium (1)
- France (6)
- Great Britain (4)
- Italy (1)
- Japan (4)
- Netherlands (1)
- Rhodesia (1)
- South Africa (3)
- Sweden (1)
- Switzerland (1)
- United States (14)

== Medal summary ==
=== Men's events ===
Event	Gold	Silver	Bronze
Albion round open	Dean Slaugh; United States	Peter Blanker; Netherlands	Raymond Schelfaut; Belgium
Albion round team open	United States (USA); Dick Robinson; Dean Slaugh; Jack Whitman	Japan (JPN); Shoichi Ando; Tokuji Ando; Tsuyoshi Matsumoto	None
Columbia round open	Dan Kotter; United States	Raimondo Longhi; Italy	George Pasipanki; United States
Columbia round team open	United States (USA); Bob Hawkes; Dan Kotter; George Pasipanki	France (FRA); Lercerf; Musy; Seguin	None
FITA round open	Dean Slaugh; United States	Peter Blanker; Netherlands	Eric Johansson; Sweden
FITA round team open	United States (USA); Jim Mathis; Dean Slaugh; Jack Whitman	Japan (JPN); Shoichi Ando; Tsuyoshi Matsumoto; Sadakazu Saito	None
St. Nicholas round open	G. P. Marais; South Africa	Roy Fowler; Australia	David; France
St. Nicholas round team open	France (FRA); David; Ilanoun; Roger Schuh	Australia (AUS); Lionel Cousens; Roy Fowler; John Martin	None

=== Women's events ===
Event	Gold	Silver	Bronze
Albion round open	Margaret Harriman; Rhodesia	Valerie Forder; Great Britain	Daphne Ceeney; Australia
Columbia round open	B. Rosenzweig; United States	Daphne Legge-Willis; Great Britain	Carol Tetley; Great Britain
FITA round open	Margaret Harriman; Rhodesia	N. Thesen; South Africa	R. Irvine; Great Britain
St. Nicholas round open	I. Marincowitz; South Africa	Caroline Troxler-Kung; Switzerland	Irene Preslipski; United States
