= Wheelchair fencing at the 1964 Summer Paralympics =

Wheelchair fencing at the II Paralympic Games
- Paralympic Wheelchair fencing

Wheelchair fencing at the 1964 Summer Paralympics consisted of seven events.

== Medal summary ==
Event	Gold	Silver	Bronze
Men's épée individual	Serge Bec; France	Roberto Marson; Italy	Germano Pecchenino; Italy
Men's épée team	Italy (ITA); Roberto Marson; Renzo Rogo; Franco Rossi	France (FRA); Serge Bec; Michel Foucre; Aimé Planchon	Great Britain (GBR); Brian Dickenson; James Shipman; Cyril Thomas
Men's foil novice individual	Cyril Thomas; Great Britain	Frank Ponta; Australia	Carfagna; Italy
Men's sabre individual	Serge Bec; France	Roberto Marson; Italy	Aimé Planchon; France
Men's sabre team	France (FRA); Serge Bec; Foucre; Aimé Planchon	Japan (JPN); Shigeo Aono; Shigeo Harasawa; Teiichi Saito	Italy (ITA); Roberto Marson; Renzo Rogo; Franco Rossi
Women's foil individual	Anna Maria Toso; Italy	Judith Waterman; United States	Daphne Ceeney; Australia
Women's foil team	Italy (ITA); Elena Monaco; Irene Monaco; Anna Maria Toso	Great Britain (GBR); Valerie Forder; Shelagh Jones; Diana Thompson	United States (USA); Ella Cox; Carol Giesse; Judith Waterman
