= Weightlifting at the 1964 Summer Paralympics =

Weightlifting at the II Paralympic Games
- Paralympic Weightlifting
- Dates: 09 - 12 November 1964
- Competitors: 18 from 10 nations

Weightlifting at the 1964 Summer Paralympics consisted of four events for men held 09 - 12 November 1964.

== Participating nations ==
There were 18 male competitors representing 10 nations.

- Argentina (3)
- Australia (3)
- Fiji (1)
- France (1)
- Great Britain (4)
- Ireland (1)
- Israel (1)
- Rhodesia (1)
- South Africa (1)
- United States (2)

== Medal summary ==
=== Medal table ===
There were 12 medal winners representing six nations.

Rank	Nation	Gold	Silver	Bronze	Total
1	Great Britain (GBR)	1	1	2	4
2	Argentina (ARG)	1	0	1	2
3	Israel (ISR)	1	0	0	1
3	South Africa (RSA)	1	0	0	1
5	Australia (AUS)	0	3	0	3
6	United States (USA)	0	0	1	1
Totals (6 entries)		4	4	4	12

=== Men's events ===
Event	Gold	Silver	Bronze
Men's featherweight	J. Redgwick; Great Britain	Michael Dow; Australia	Héctor Brandoni; Argentina
Men's lightweight	Fernando Bustelli; Argentina	Gary Hooper; Australia	Don Kennedy; United States
Men's middleweight	B. Humble; South Africa	Tom Palmer; Great Britain	David Pickering; Great Britain
Men's heavyweight	Shalom Dlugatch; Israel	Vic Renalson; Australia	Ralph Rowe; Great Britain
