= Great Britain at the 1964 Summer Paralympics =

- Flag of the United Kingdom
- IPC code: GBR (GBI used at these Games)
- NPC: British Paralympic Association
- Website: www.paralympics.org.uk

in Tokyo
- Competitors: 39 in 9 sports
- Medals Ranked 2nd: Gold 18 Silver 23 Bronze 20 Total 61

Summer Paralympics appearances (overview)
- 1960; 1964; 1968; 1972; 1976; 1980; 1984; 1988; 1992; 1996; 2000; 2004; 2008; 2012; 2016; 2020; 2024

Great Britain sent a delegation to compete at the 1964 Summer Paralympics in Tokyo, Japan. Its athletes finished second in the gold and overall medal count.

== Medalists ==
Medal	Name	Sport	Event
Gold	Dick Thompson	Athletics	Men's club throw A
Gold	Dick Thompson	Athletics	Men's javelin throw A
Gold	Carol Bryant	Athletics	Women's wheelchair dash below T10
Gold	Carol Bryant	Athletics	Women's slalom open
Gold	Michael Shelton	Snooker	Men's paraplegics open
Gold	David Ellis	Swimming	Men's 25m freestyle prone complete class 2
Gold	David Ellis	Swimming	Men's 25m freestyle supine complete class 2
Gold	W. Thornton	Swimming	Men's 50m breaststroke complete class 3
Gold	Pauline Foulds	Swimming	Women's 50m freestyle prone complete class 4
Gold	Valerie Forder	Swimming	Women's 50m freestyle supine complete class 3
Gold	Pauline Foulds	Swimming	Women's 50m freestyle supine complete class 4
Gold	Pauline Foulds	Swimming	Women's 50m breaststroke complete class 4
Gold	Tommy Taylor	Table tennis	Men's singles A2
Gold	Paul Lyall	Table tennis	Men's singles B
Gold	Michael Beck; Tommy Taylor	Table tennis	Men's doubles A2
Gold	Gwen Buck; Susan Masham	Table tennis	Women's doubles B
Gold	J. Redgwick	Weightlifting	Men's featherweight
Gold	Cyril Thomas	Wheelchair fencing	Men's foil novice individual
Silver	Valerie Forder	Archery	Women's Albion round open
Silver	Daphne Legge-Willis	Archery	Women's Columbia round open
Silver	D. Pickering	Athletics	Men's club throw B
Silver	Dick Thompson	Athletics	Men's shot put A
Silver	G. Williams	Swimming	Men's 50m freestyle prone incomplete class 3
Silver	P. Newman	Swimming	Men's 50m freestyle prone special class
Silver	W. Thornton	Swimming	Men's 50m freestyle supine complete class 3
Silver	David Ellis	Swimming	Men's 25m breaststroke complete class 2
Silver	S. Miles	Swimming	Men's 25m breaststroke incomplete class 1
Silver	Brian Dickinson	Swimming	Men's 50m breaststroke complete class 4
Silver	Susan Masham	Swimming	Women's 25m freestyle prone complete class 2
Silver	Valerie Forder	Swimming	Women's 50m freestyle prone complete class 3
Silver	Susan Masham	Swimming	Women's 25m freestyle supine complete class 2
Silver	Janet Laughton	Swimming	Women's 50m freestyle supine complete class 3
Silver	Susan Masham	Swimming	Women's 25m breaststroke complete class 2
Silver	Valerie Forder	Swimming	Women's 50m breaststroke complete class 3
Silver	Michael Beck	Table tennis	Men's singles A2
Silver	Jimmy Gibson; Ginger Swindlehurst	Table tennis	Men's doubles C
Silver	Susan Masham	Table tennis	Women's singles B
Silver	Marjorie Cooper; Diana Thompson	Table tennis	Women's doubles C
Silver	T. Palmer	Weightlifting	Men's middleweight
Silver	Men's team	Wheelchair basketball	Men's class A complete
Silver	Valerie Forder; Shelagh Jones; Diana Thompson	Wheelchair fencing	Women's foil team
Bronze	Carol Tetley	Archery	Women's Columbia round open
Bronze	R. Irvine	Archery	Women's FITA round open
Bronze	Dick Thompson	Athletics	Men's wheelchair dash above T10
Bronze	Dick Thompson	Athletics	Men's Pentathlon 1
Bronze	R. Rowe	Athletics	Men's club throw C
Bronze	Janet Laughton	Athletics	Women's club throw A
Bronze	R. Harvey	Athletics	Women's club throw B
Bronze	Valerie Forder	Athletics	Women's discus throw C
Bronze	Leo Halford	Swimming	Men's 50m freestyle supine special class
Bronze	S. Miles	Swimming	Men's 25m freestyle prone incomplete class 1
Bronze	S. Miles	Swimming	Men's 25m freestyle supine incomplete class 1
Bronze	Brian Dickinson	Swimming	Men's 50m freestyle supine complete class 4
Bronze	M. Gibbs	Swimming	Women's 50m breaststroke cauda equina
Bronze	Janet Laughton	Swimming	Women's 50m breaststroke complete class 3
Bronze	Jimmy Gibson	Table tennis	Men's singles C
Bronze	Paul Lyall; Hugh Stewart	Table tennis	Men's doubles B
Bronze	Shelagh Jones; Carol Tetley	Table tennis	Women's doubles B
Bronze	D. Pickering	Weightlifting	Men's middleweight
Bronze	R. Rowe	Weightlifting	Men's heavyweight
Bronze	Brian Dickinson; James Shipman; Cyril Thomas	Wheelchair fencing	Men's épée team

=== Medals by sport ===
Medals by sport
Sport	Gold medal	Silver medal	Bronze medal	Total
Swimming	7	12	6	25
Table Tennis	4	4	3	11
Athletics	4	2	6	12
Weightlifting	1	1	2	4
Wheelchair Fencing	1	1	1	3
Snooker	1	0	0	1
Archery	0	2	2	4
Wheelchair Basketball	0	1	0	1
Total	18	23	20	61

== See also ==
- Great Britain at the Paralympics
- Great Britain at the 1964 Summer Olympics
