= Dartchery at the 1964 Summer Paralympics =

Dartchery at the II Paralympic Games

Medalists
1st place, gold medalist(s)		Margaret Harriman; George Mann	Rhodesia
2nd place, silver medalist(s)		Jim Mathis; John Tigyer	United States
3rd place, bronze medalist(s)		Tokuji Ando; Tsuyoshi Matsumoto	Japan
3rd place, bronze medalist(s)		Pesnaud	France
3rd place, bronze medalist(s)		Raymond Schelfaut	Belgium

Dartchery at the 1964 Summer Paralympics consisted of a mixed pairs event. France and Belgium both sent one competitor each to form a team.

== Medal summary ==
Event	Gold	Silver	Bronze
Mixed pairs open	Rhodesia (RHO); Margaret Harriman; George Mann	United States (USA); J. Mathis; G. Pasipanki	Japan (JPN); Tokuji Ando; Tsuyoshi Matsumoto
Mixed pairs open	Rhodesia (RHO); Margaret Harriman; George Mann	United States (USA); J. Mathis; G. Pasipanki	France (FRA); Pesnaud
Mixed pairs open	Rhodesia (RHO); Margaret Harriman; George Mann	United States (USA); J. Mathis; G. Pasipanki	Belgium (BEL); Raymond Schelfaut
