= Table tennis at the 1964 Summer Paralympics =

Table tennis at the II Paralympic Games
- Paralympic Table tennis

Table tennis at the 1964 Summer Paralympics consisted of twelve events, eight for men and four for women.

== Medal table ==
Rank	Nation	Gold	Silver	Bronze	Total
1	Great Britain (GBR)	4	4	3	11
2	United States (USA)	1	2	2	5
3	Israel (ISR)	1	1	4	6
4	Japan (JPN)	1	1	2	4
5	Netherlands (NED)	1	1	1	3
6	Italy (ITA)	1	1	0	2
7	Austria (AUT)	1	0	4	5
8	Australia (AUS)	1	0	3	4
9	Belgium (BEL)	1	0	0	1
10	Argentina (ARG)	0	2	0	2
11	West Germany (FRG)	0	0	2	2
Totals (11 entries)		12	12	21	45

== Medal summary ==
=== Men's events ===
Event	Gold	Silver	Bronze
Singles A1	Stefan Florescu; United States	Gerard Jacobs; Netherlands	Marion de Groot; Netherlands
Singles A1	Stefan Florescu; United States	Gerard Jacobs; Netherlands	Vincent Falardeau; United States
Singles A2	Tommy Taylor; Great Britain	Michael Beck; Great Britain	Allan McLucas; Australia
Singles A2	Tommy Taylor; Great Britain	Michael Beck; Great Britain	Joseph Sharav; Israel
Singles B	Paul Lyall; Great Britain	Honorio Romero; Argentina	Engelbert Rangger; Austria
Singles B	Paul Lyall; Great Britain	Honorio Romero; Argentina	E. Fliessar; Austria
Singles C	Baruch Hagai; Israel	Takenori Yamazaki; Japan	Kazunari Otsuka; Japan
Singles C	Baruch Hagai; Israel	Takenori Yamazaki; Japan	Jimmy Gibson; Great Britain
Doubles A1	Netherlands (NED); Gerard Jacobs; Marion de Groot	United States (USA); Vincent Falardeau; Stefan Florescu	None
Doubles A2	Great Britain (GBR); Michael Beck; Tommy Taylor	United States (USA); Samuel Goldstein; Phil Mastbergen	United States (USA); E. Little; E. Mulry
Doubles B	Italy (ITA); Giovanni Ferraris; Federico Zarilli	Argentina (ARG); Helvio Aresca; Honorio Romero	Great Britain (GBR); Paul Lyall; Hugh Stewart
Doubles B	Italy (ITA); Giovanni Ferraris; Federico Zarilli	Argentina (ARG); Helvio Aresca; Honorio Romero	Austria (AUT); E. Fliessar; Engelbert Rangger
Doubles C	Japan (JPN); Yasunori Igari; Fujio Watanabe	Great Britain (GBR); Jimmy Gibson; Ginger Swindlehurst	Israel (ISR); Yitzhak Galitzki; Baruch Hagai
Doubles C	Japan (JPN); Yasunori Igari; Fujio Watanabe	Great Britain (GBR); Jimmy Gibson; Ginger Swindlehurst	Germany (GER); Fuchs; Heinz Simon

=== Women's events ===
Event	Gold	Silver	Bronze
Singles B	Rosa Kuhnel; Austria	Susan Masham; Great Britain	Michal Escapa; Israel
Singles B	Rosa Kuhnel; Austria	Susan Masham; Great Britain	Elaine Schreiber; Australia
Singles C	Yvette Alloo; Belgium	Batia Mishani; Israel	Marion O'Brien; Australia
Singles C	Yvette Alloo; Belgium	Batia Mishani; Israel	Marlene Muhlendyck; Germany
Doubles B	Great Britain (GBR); Gwen Buck; Susan Masham	Italy (ITA); Silvana Martino; Anna Maria Toso	Great Britain (GBR); Sheelagh Jones; Carol Tetley
Doubles B	Great Britain (GBR); Gwen Buck; Susan Masham	Italy (ITA); Silvana Martino; Anna Maria Toso	Austria (AUT); I. Driessler; Rosa Kuhnel
Doubles C	Australia (AUS); Daphne Ceeney; Marion O'Brien	Great Britain (GBR); Marjorie Cooper; Dick Thompson	Israel (ISR); Batia Mishani; Zipora Rubin-Rosenbaum
Doubles C	Australia (AUS); Daphne Ceeney; Marion O'Brien	Great Britain (GBR); Marjorie Cooper; Dick Thompson	Japan (JPN); Chiyono Inoue; Fumiyo Ogasawara
