= Frank Vecera =

American paralympic athlete, snooker and wheelchair basketball player

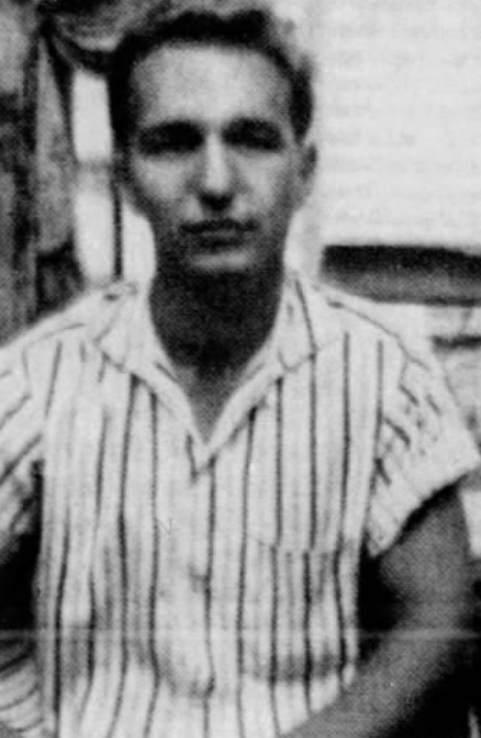
- Vecera in 1958

Personal information
- Born: Frank Leonard Vecera Jr. October 23, 1937 East St. Louis, Illinois, U.S.
- Died: November 9, 1987 (aged 50) Arlington, Texas, U.S.
- Education: Saint Louis University; University of Illinois Urbana-Champaign

Sport
- Country: United States
- Sport: Para-athletics; Snooker; Wheelchair basketball
Medal record
Representing United States
Paralympic Games
Para-athletics
Silver medal – second place	1964 Tokyo	Men's pentathlon 1
Bronze medal – third place	1964 Tokyo	Men's javelin A
Bronze medal – third place	1964 Tokyo	Men's discus throw A
Bronze medal – third place	1964 Tokyo	Men's club throw A
Snooker
Silver medal – second place	1964 Tokyo	Men's snooker
Wheelchair basketball
Gold medal – first place	1960 Rome	Men's wheelchair basketball tournament A
Gold medal – first place	1964 Tokyo	Men's wheelchair basketball tournament A complete

Frank Leonard Vecera Jr. (October 23, 1937 – November 9, 1987) was an American paralympic athlete, snooker and wheelchair basketball player. He competed at the 1960 and 1964 Summer Paralympics.

== Life and career ==
Vecera was born in East St. Louis, Illinois, the son of Frank Sr. and Mary Vecera. He attended Saint Louis University, studying to be an engineer. He also attended the University of Illinois Urbana-Champaign, earning his BA degree in advertising design. He was a member of the Long Beach Flying Wheels.

Vecera competed at the 1960 Summer Paralympics, winning the gold medal in the men's wheelchair basketball tournament A event. He then competed at the 1964 Summer Paralympics, winning three bronze medals, two silver medals and a gold medal in athletics, snooker and wheelchair basketball. After competing in the Paralympics, he worked as a real estate investor in Arlington, Texas.

== Death ==
Vecera died on November 9, 1987, in Arlington, Texas, at the age of 50.
