= Saul Welger =

American Paralympic athlete (1931–2002)

Personal information
- Nationality: American
- Born: 18 April 1931 New York City, New York, United States
- Died: 10 October 2002 (aged 71) Brooklyn, New York, United States
- Spouse: Christa Welger (m. 1962–2002)

Sport
- Sport: Athletics; Wheelchair basketball
Medal record
Representing United States
Paralympic Games
Athletics
Bronze medal – third place	1960 Rome	Men's Shot Put C
Wheelchair basketball
Gold medal – first place	1960 Rome	Men's Tournament Class B
Gold medal – first place	1964 Tokyo	Men's Tournament Class B Incomplete

Saul Welger (18 April 1931 – 10 October 2002) from Brooklyn, New York, was a United States Paralympic athlete. In the 1960 Summer Paralympics and 1964 Summer Paralympics he competed in multiple sports, including wheelchair basketball.

Welger competed at the 1958 and 1959 Stoke Mandeville Games. In the 1960 and 1964 Paralympics he was a member of the winning United States wheelchair basketball team. In 1976, Welger was inducted into the NWBA Hall of Fame. He hired Junius Kellogg as the first Black coach in wheelchair basketball.

Welger married West German wheelchair athlete Christa E. Zander in 1963; they had two children, born in 1966 and 1970. Saul Welger died in 2002. After Christa Welger's death in 2019, the Christa & Saul Welger Foundation was established, to continue their work in supporting accessible sports opportunities for physically disabled youth.
