= Italy at the 1964 Summer Paralympics =

Italian delegation to sporting event

- IPC code: ITA
- NPC: Comitato Italiano Paralimpico
- Website: Official website (in Italian)

in Tokyo
- Medals Ranked 2nd: Gold 14 Silver 15 Bronze 14 Total 43

Summer Paralympics appearances (overview)
- 1960; 1964; 1968; 1972; 1976; 1980; 1984; 1988; 1992; 1996; 2000; 2004; 2008; 2012; 2016; 2020; 2024

Italy sent a delegation to compete at the 1964 Summer Paralympics in Tokyo, Japan. Its athletes finished third in the gold and overall medal count.

== The wrong reports ==
Since at the dawn of the Paralympic Games there was no precision in reporting the results of the competitions, the Israeli athlete Michal Escapa was indicated with the Italian nationality and without prename (and so she is mentioned in the International Paralympic Committee of the Italian Paralympic Committee web sites) for the reports of the Swimming at the 1964 Summer Paralympics where she won two bronze medals, simply reported as Escapa and not as Michal Escapa. However, as can be seen from a 1968 Israeli newspaper reporting an interview with the athlete, she was the same athlete who had won medals in swimming and table tennis in Tokyo 1964.

== Medalists ==
Italian nationality mistakenly attributed to the Israeli swimmer Michal Escapa.

Medal	Athlete	Sport	Event
Gold	Giovanni Benincasa	Athletics	Shot put C
Gold	Roberto Marson	Athletics	Discus throw C
Gold	Roberto Marson	Athletics	Javelin throw C
Gold	Irene Monaco	Athletics	Discus throw D
Gold	Anna Maria Toso	Athletics	Javelin throw A
Gold	Anna Maria Toso	Athletics	Shot put A
Gold	Francesco Deiana	Swimming	25 m breaststroke complete class 2
Gold	Renzo Rogo	Swimming	25 m freestyle supine incomplete class 2
Gold	Renzo Rogo	Swimming	25 m breaststroke incomplete class 2
Gold	Anna Maria Toso	Swimming	25 m freestyle supine incomplete class 2
Gold	Giovanni Ferraris; Federico Zarilli	Table tennis	
Gold	Roberto Marson; Renzo Rogo; Franco Rossi	Fencing	
Gold	Elena Monaco; Irene Monaco; Anna Maria Toso	Fencing	
Gold	Anna Maria Toso	Fencing	Foil individual
Silver	Roberto Marson	Athletics	Club throw C
Silver	Roberto Marson	Athletics	Slalom open
Silver	Roberto Marson	Fencing	
Silver	Roberto Marson	Fencing	
Silver	Anna Maria Toso	Athletics	Club throw A
Silver	Anna Maria Toso	Athletics	Discus throw A
Silver	Anna Maria Toso; Silvana Martino	Table tennis	Double
Silver	Francesco Deiana	Swimming	25 m freestyle prone complete class 2
Silver	Elena Monaco	Swimming	50 m freestyle prone incomplete class 4
Silver	Irene Monaco	Swimming	50 m breaststroke incomplete class 3
Silver	Germano Pecchenino	Swimming	50 m freestyle supine special class
Silver	Anna Maria Toso	Swimming	25 m freestyle prone incomplete class 2
Silver	Anna Maria Toso	Swimming	25 m breaststroke incomplete class 2
Silver	Oliviero Venturi	Swimming	25 m breaststroke incomplete class 2
Silver	Raimondo Longhi	Archery	Columbia round open
Bronze	Giovanni Benincasa	Athletics	Discus throw C
Bronze	Vincenzo Borghese	Athletics	Club throw B
Bronze	Silvio Boscu	Swimming	50 m freestyle supine complete class 5
Bronze	Francesco Deiana	Swimming	25 m freestyle supine complete class 2
~~Bronze~~	~~Escapa~~	~~Swimming~~	~~25 m freestyle prone incomplete class 2~~
~~Bronze~~	~~Escapa~~	~~Swimming~~	~~25 m breaststroke incomplete class 2~~
Bronze	Irene Monaco	Swimming	50 m freestyle supine incomplete class 4
Bronze	Irene Monaco	Swimming	50 m breaststroke incomplete class 4
Bronze	Germano Pecchenino	Swimming	50 m breaststroke special class
Bronze	Germano Pecchenino	Fencing	
Bronze	Giovanni Pische	Swimming	50 m freestyle prone complete class 3
Bronze	Renzo Rogo	Swimming	25 m freestyle prone incomplete class 2
Bronze	Renzo Rogo; Roberto Marson; Franco Rossi	Fencing	
Bronze	Franco Rossi	Swimming	50 m freestyle prone cauda equina
Bronze	Pasquale Carfagna	Fencing	
Bronze	Silvana Martino	Swimming	25 m freestyle supine complete class 2

== See also ==
- 1964 Summer Paralympics
- Italy at the 1964 Summer Olympics
