= Zipora Rubin-Rosenbaum =

Israeli Paralympic athlete (born 1946)

Personal information
- Native name: ציפורה רובין-רוזנבאום

Sport
- Country: Israel
Medal record
Representing Israel
Paralympic Games
Women's para-athletics
Gold medal – first place	1964 Tokyo	Shot put D
Gold medal – first place	1968 Tel Aviv	Club throw D
Gold medal – first place	1968 Tel Aviv	Javelin D
Gold medal – first place	1968 Tel Aviv	Pentathlon special class
Gold medal – first place	1968 Tel Aviv	Shot put D
Gold medal – first place	1972 Heidelberg	Javelin 5
Gold medal – first place	1976 Toronto	Javelin 5
Gold medal – first place	1976 Toronto	Pentathlon 5
Gold medal – first place	1976 Toronto	Shot put 5
Gold medal – first place	1980 Arnhem	Javelin 5
Gold medal – first place	1984 New York	Discus throw 6
Gold medal – first place	1984 New York	Javelin 5
Gold medal – first place	1988 Seoul	Javelin 5
Silver medal – second place	1968 Tel Aviv	Discus D
Silver medal – second place	1972 Heidelberg	Shot put 5
Silver medal – second place	1976 Toronto	Discus 5
Silver medal – second place	1984 New York	Shot put 5
Silver medal – second place	1984 New York	Pentathlon 6
Bronze medal – third place	1964 Tokyo	Discus D
Bronze medal – third place	1964 Tokyo	Javelin D
Bronze medal – third place	1980 Arnhem	Shot put 5
Bronze medal – third place	1988 Seoul	Shot put 5
Bronze medal – third place	1988 Seoul	Pentathlon 5-6
Women's wheelchair basketball
Gold medal – first place	1968 Tel Aviv	Team
Gold medal – first place	1976 Toronto	Team
Silver medal – second place	1980 Arnhem	Team
Silver medal – second place	1984 New York	Team
Bronze medal – third place	1972 Heidelberg	Team
Women's swimming
Silver medal – second place	1964 Tokyo	50 m freestyle prone cauda equina
Silver medal – second place	1968 Tel Aviv	Medley relay
Women's table tennis
Bronze medal – third place	1964 Tokyo	Doubles C

Left to right: Michal Escapa, Mali Meizan, Geula Siri, Malka Halfon, Batia Shviki, Ayala Malhan, Shoshana Sharabi, Ruth Botton, Batia Mishani, Neora Even-Zahav, Zipora Rubin. Coach on the right: Reuven Heller.

Zipora Rubin-Rosenbaum (Hebrew: ציפורה רובין-רוזנבאום; born 1946) is an Israeli athlete who has won 31 Paralympic medals. She has represented Israel at the Summer Paralympic Games seven times and has competed in athletics, swimming, table tennis, and wheelchair basketball at the Games.

== Paralympics ==
Her first appearance came at the 1964 Summer Paralympics, the second ever Paralympics, held in Tokyo, Japan. Zipora competed in five events and won a medal in each; three athletics field events; the women's doubles table tennis, alongside playing partner Mishani; and 50 metre freestyle swimming. She took gold in the women's shot put D, setting a new world record of 5.16 metres. She also won bronze medals in the javelin, discus and table tennis and a silver in her swimming event behind compatriot Mishani.

At the 1968 Summer Paralympics in Tel Aviv Rubin-Rosenbaum won a further four gold medals and two silver medals. In the 1972 Games, hosted in Heidelberg, West Germany, she won a gold medal in javelin with a new world record of 18.5 metres, and also won a silver medal in the shot put. In the Toronto Games Rubin-Rosenbaum defended her title in javelin, and also won gold medals in pentathlon and discus, as well as a silver in shot put. She won her fourth Paralympic javelin gold medal in 1980, also taking the bronze medal in shot put.

In the 1984 Summer Paralympics she again won 2 gold and 2 silver medals in athletic fields. In 1988 in Seoul and won three more medals, a gold in javelin and bronzes in both pentathlon and shot put. Her final Paralympics came in 1992 in Barcelona where she finished eighth in the javelin THS2 event and thirteenth in the THS2 shot put.

She was a member of the national women wheelchair basketball team and competed in wheelchair basketball at the Paralympic Games from 1968 to 1988, winning 2 gold medals, 2 silver medals and 1 bronze medal.

== See also ==
- Israel at the Paralympics
- List of multiple Paralympic gold medalists
