= Samuel Goldstein =

American sportsman and Paralympian

- Goldstein as Paralympian in mid-60's

Personal information
- Full name: Samuel Hyman Goldstein
- Born: January 6, 1945 Philadelphia, Pennsylvania, U.S.
- Died: January 15, 1977 (aged 32) Philadelphia, Pennsylvania
- Education: Pennsylvania Rehabilitation Center; Mechanical Drafting
- Occupations: Design Draftsman; Sales, Customer Service
- Height: 5 ft 11 in (180 cm)
- Weight: 175 lb (79 kg) at 18
- Spouse: Margaret Mary Miller (m. 1968)
- Children: 1

Sport
- Sport: swimming, table tennis, track
- Club: Central Penn Wheelers
- Coached by: Louis I. Neishloss (Wheelers, 68 Paralympics)
Medal record
Representing United States
Paralympic Games
Men's para swimming
Silver medal – second place	1964 Tokyo	25 m freestyle prone incomplete class 1
Silver medal – second place	1964 Tokyo	25 m freestyle supine incomplete class 1
Bronze medal – third place	1964 Tokyo	25 m breaststroke incomplete class 1
Men's para table tennis
Silver medal – second place	1964 Tokyo	Doubles A2

Samuel Hyman Goldstein (January 6, 1945 – January 15, 1977) was an American sportsman and Paralympian who won two silver medals in freestyle swimming events and a bronze medal in breaststroke at the 1964 Tokyo Paralympic Games, also winning a silver medal in table tennis. After marrying medical researcher and paralympian Margaret M. Miller in September 1968, he worked in greater Philadelphia as a design draftsman for appliance company Proctor-Silex, and later in sales for the American Interlining Corporation. An active member of the American Wheelchair Athletic Association, he coached Philadelphia's Easter Seals Paranut Wheelchair Basketball team, a sport that has since gained a wider base of participants.

== Early life ==
Samuel Goldstein was born January 6, 1945, to Louis and Rose Goldstein in Philadelphia, Pennsylvania, five years after his older sister Helane, his only sibling. While a 14 year old Freshman at Philadelphia's Northeast High School, according to one source, he acquired a blood disease which accounted for his paralysis. Several more recent sources state that by 1961–2, he had acquired what is now known as Guillain-Barre syndrome, a rare neurological disease similar to Polio that caused paralysis of his right side and severely limited the use of his legs. Though he may have made a partial recovery from the disease, his paralysis remained. Initially, he was left as a quadriplegic. Challenged but unfettered by his paralysis, Goldstein trained in a variety of athletic pursuits to gain strength and function, while continuing high school through graduation at Levittown's Woodrow Wilson High School, just North of Philadelphia, now known as Harry S. Truman High School. Affecting a partial recovery from his paralysis he gained some function in his arms and hands, and was able to walk with the aid of braces and crutches.

=== Pennsylvania Rehabilitation Center ===
Graduating from the program in mechanical drafting at the Pennsylvania Rehabilitation Center in Johnstown, Pennsylvania around 1965, Goldstein stayed busy with classes throughout the day. At the center, he also trained in swimming and other sports as part of his physical rehabilitation. First learning to swim at the center as part of his rehabilitation, by 1964 he was able to swim a combined distance of ten miles in three months by swimming around one hour per day in a small 50-foot pool. During his athletic career, he competed in bowling, table tennis, and track with a focus on the discus and 40-yard dash. In competitive swimming meets, he competed in the freestyle, backstroke, and breaststroke.

In one of his better-known achievements demonstrating his athletic endurance, in the mid-1960's he became the first paraplegic to complete the 50-mile swim badge sponsored by the American Red Cross. The swim was likely performed over several months as a cumulative distance challenge, not a single day event or race.

=== 1964 Paralympic Qualifier ===
At the National Wheelchair Olympics in New York, Goldstein won three events in swimming, table tennis and bowling, gaining a birth with 60 other paralympians to the World Paralympics in Tokyo held from November 8–15, 1964. The team left for Tokyo on November 2, 1964, stopping first to train for three days in Hawaii.

== 1964 Tokyo Paralympics ==
Around the age of 19, as a participant in swimming at the November, 1964 Tokyo Paralympics, he captured two silver medals in freestyle events, one bronze in the breaststroke and one silver medal in doubles table tennis.

=== 1967 Stoke Mandeville Games ===
At the 1967 Stoke Mandeville Games in slalom track para skiing, a skiing competition featuring frequent turns, Goldstein captured a gold medal. He won a silver in the backstroke competition. The Stoke Mandeville games had a history as one of the earliest of paralympic events, and were initially held in July, 1948, in the rural town of Buckinghamshire, England, about 36 miles or 60km from London, England. Neurosurgeon Dr. Ludwig Guttmann, Director of the National Spine Clinic at Stoke Mandeville Hospital was responsible for organizing the first Stoke Mandeville Games, and was assisted ably by his administrator Joan Scrutin, who helped open the games to women.

In July 1968, while competing for the Central Pennsylvania Wheelers, Goldstein was chosen as a wheelchair racer with a group of seven paralympians to compete at the International Paralympic Competition in Israel. With the Wheelers who competed in a variety of events, Goldstein was coached by Louis Neishloss of Norristown, Pennsylvania. Neishloss, degreed in therapeutic recreation from Temple University, founded the Central Penn Wheelers wheelchair team, and was an accomplished athlete in race walking. At the 1968 Summer Paralympics held in Tel Aviv, Israel, Neishloss coached the U.S. National team, which Goldstein had qualified for in July, 1968, though there is no record he attended.

=== Marriage ===
In January 1968, Goldstein announced his engagement to Margaret Mary Miller, of Hannover, Pennsylvania. Miller was a 1965 graduate of Delone Catholic High School, in Harrisburg, Pennsylvania, and a laboratory graduate in 1968 of Camp Hill, Pennsylvania's Holy Spirit Hospital majoring in histology. Histology is the microscopic study of living cells, which could focus on blood cells and pathology. Miller was an amputee, who had also competed in the Paralympics. At the time of their marriage, she worked in the research department of Philadelphia's Albert Einstein Medical Center. The couple were married on the afternoon of September 28, 1968, in the Basilica of the Sacred Heart in Conewago, Pennsylvania, with participation by the bride's father and her sister as matron of honor. Louis Neishloss, Goldstein's coach with the Central Penn Wheelers served as Best Man. The couple honeymooned in Canada, and planned to reside in Philadelphia where they would remain.

=== Careers ===
In 1968, Goldstein worked as a design draftsman for Philadelphia's Proctor Silex Company, primarily a manufacturer of kitchen appliances. After his more elite athletic career as a paralympian, Goldstein worked in customer relations and sales for Philadelphia's American Interlining Corporation. Interlining products are fabric linings that are inserted between other layers of fabric to provide stability and support, and may include such fabrics as garments, items for home decor including drapes and curtains, and other items that decorate a home including upholstery cover used with furniture including sofas and armchairs.

== Death ==
He died Saturday, January 15, 1977, at the age of 32, at Jeanes Hospital in Northeast Philadelphia, from pneumonia, as a result of Guillain–Barré syndrome which he developed after receiving a swine flu inoculation two months earlier. When Goldstein died, his son Craig was around two years old. Paralysis, often of the legs, is a common symptom of Guillain-Barre and pneumonia is frequently a complication of the syndrome. The swine-flu vaccine of 1976, strongly advocated by the U.S. government, was later considered a questionable decision, and of the 40 million Americans vaccinated with the swine flu vaccine, according to several sources, approximately 300-400 developed Guillain-Barre syndrome. In early 1977, David Sencer, a head of the CDC, made a public statement that Guillain-Barre could be a side effect of the swine flu vaccine.

Goldstein was buried at Mount Jacob Cemetery in Glenolden, Pennsylvania, Southwest of Philadelphia where his wife Margaret would be buried in 2023. A funeral for Goldstein was held on Monday, January 17, at the Joseph Levin Funeral Home. After his death, Goldstein's family filed a claim which came under the legal jurisdiction of the federal Swine Flu Act of 1976, which gave sole liability to the U.S. government for injuries related to the swine flu vaccine. Around 1982, five years after his death, Goldstein's wife, the former Margaret M. Miller, and his six-year-old son Craig received a generous settlement of $850,000 from the suit resulting from his death, with one source quoting a figure of $906,781, a record at the time. In 2009, Margaret Goldstein, a former medical researcher, stated she did not necessarily discourage Americans from taking vaccines recommended by the CDC, particularly flu vaccines, but that they should carefully evaluate the stated side effects in light of their own health history. A few physicians believed the blood disease he contacted in his teens was a factor leading to his death.

=== Honors ===
He was inducted to the Pennsylvania Wheelchair Hall of Fame, as its first member, in 1979, and the Philadelphia Jewish Sports Hall of Fame in 2008.
