= Stefan Florescu =

American paralympic swimmer and table tennis player

Personal information
- Born: 1926 or 1927 Davenport, Iowa, U.S.
- Died: October 29, 2010 (aged 83)
- Spouse: Carolyn Florescu

Sport
- Country: United States
- Sport: Swimming; Table tennis
- Disability: Tetraplegia
Medal record
Representing United States
Paralympic Games
Swimming
Bronze medal – third place	1964 Tokyo	25m freestyle prone complete class 1
Bronze medal – third place	1964 Tokyo	25m freestyle supine complete class 1
Silver medal – second place	1964 Tokyo	25m breaststroke complete class 1
Table tennis
Gold medal – first place	1964 Tokyo	Singles A1

Stefan Florescu (1926/1927 – October 29, 2010) was an American paralympic swimmer and table tennis player. He competed at the 1964 Summer Paralympics.

== Biography ==
Florescu was born in Davenport, Iowa. He attended St. Ambrose University, graduating in 1951. In 1952 he became quadriplegic as a result of a swimming accident. He participated at the National Wheelchair Games in New York, in which Florescu won a free trip to participate at the Paralympic Games along with his teammates, in 1964.

Florescu participated at the 1964 Summer Paralympics, with participating in the swimming competition at the Paralympic Games. He was awarded the bronze medal in the 25m freestyle prone complete class 1 event. Florescu scored 1:02:20. He also participated in the 25m freestyle supine complete class 1 event, being awarded the bronze medal. Florescu scored 0:57:20. He also participated in the 25m breaststroke complete class 1 event, being awarded the silver medal. Florescu scored 1:36:80. He participated in the table tennis competition at the Paralympic Games. Florescu participated in the Singles A1 event, being awarded the gold medal.

Florescu died in October 2010, at the age of 83.
