= Yvette Alloo =

Belgian Paralympic table tennis player (1930–2020)

Personal information
- Nationality: Belgian
- Born: 21 June 1930 Brussels, Belgium
- Died: 23 September 2020 (aged 90)

Sport
- Country: Belgium
- Sport: Table Tennis
- Disability: Paraplegic

Achievements and titles
- Paralympic finals: 1960 Summer Paralympics; 1964 Summer Paralympics
Medal record
Gold medal – first place	1960 Rome	Women's Table Tennis Singles Event C
Gold medal – first place	1964 Tokyo	Women's Table Tennis Singles Event C

Yvette Alloo (21 June 1930 – 23 September 2020) was a Belgian Paralympic table tennis player. She was the first Belgian to win a gold medal at a Paralympic Games.

== Biography ==
Born in Brussels in 1930, Alloo was paralyzed in her legs at the age of 15. She met her husband, Guy Herman, at the 1960 Summer Paralympics in Rome.

Alloo began playing table tennis in 1955 while in rehabilitation in Brussels. In 1960, she was one of 15 Belgian athletes to participate in the Paralympics. She competed in table tennis and fencing, taking home the gold medal in table tennis. She won a second gold medal at the 1964 Summer Paralympics in Tokyo. She ended her sporting career in 1965.

Alloo was one of the founding members of the Belgian Sports Federation for the Disabled, which would later become the Belgian Paralympic Committee. She was secretary of the trauma and rehabilitation center at Brugmann Hospital in Brussels for 35 years.

Yvette Alloo died on 23 September 2020 aged 90.
