= Don Kennedy (athlete) =

American paralympic athlete, weightlifter and wheelchair basketball player

Personal information
- Born: Donald M. Kennedy; November 4, 1932 Brooklyn, New York, U.S.
- Died: October 16, 2014 (aged 81) Hampton Bays, New York, U.S.
- Education: Queens College, City University of New York; Brooklyn Law School
- Spouse: Cecilia Galgan (m. 1958)

Sport
- Country: United States
- Sport: Para-athletics; Weightlifting; Wheelchair basketball
Medal record
Representing United States
Paralympic Games
Para-athletics
Silver medal – second place	1964 Tokyo	Men's wheelchair dash above T10
Silver medal – second place	1964 Tokyo	Men's discus throw B
Bronze medal – third place	1964 Tokyo	Men's javelin throw B
Bronze medal – third place	1964 Tokyo	Men's shot put B
Weightlifting
Bronze medal – third place	1964 Tokyo	Men's lightweight
Wheelchair basketball
Gold medal – first place	1960 Rome	Men's wheelchair basketball tournament A

Donald M. Kennedy (November 4, 1932 – October 16, 2014), also known as John Kennedy, was an American paralympic athlete, weightlifter and wheelchair basketball player. He competed at the 1960 and 1964 Summer Paralympics.

== Life and career ==
Kennedy was born in Brooklyn, New York, the son of James Kennedy and Mary Frances McCarthy. At an early age, he was hospitalized with polio, which left his legs paralyzed. During his years in hospitalization, he was educated by Dominican nuns, which after his release from hospitalization, he attended and graduated from Newtown High School. After graduating, he attended Queens College, City University of New York and Brooklyn Law School.

Kennedy competed at the 1960 Summer Paralympics, winning the gold medal in the men's wheelchair basketball tournament A event. He also competed at the 1964 Summer Paralympics, winning three bronze medals and two silver medals in athletics and weightlifting.

== Death ==
Kennedy died on October 16, 2014, at his home in Hampton Bays, New York, at the age of 81.
