= Dan Kotter =

American paralympic archer

Sport
- Country: United States
- Sport: Archery
Medal record
Representing United States
Paralympic Games
Archery
Gold medal – first place	1964 Tokyo	Columbia round open
Gold medal – first place	1964 Tokyo	Columbia round team open

Dan Kotter is an American paralympic archer. He participated at the 1964 Summer Paralympics.

== Biography ==
Kotter was the son of Glenn Kotter. He graduated at a high school in 1960, in which Kotter attended at the University of Illinois. He served as a team manager at the Mount Vernon Senior High School. Kotter lived in Mount Vernon, Indiana during the Paralympic Games, being 21 years old. He also contracted polio, when Kotter was at least one year old. He participated at the 1964 Summer Paralympics, with participating in the archery competition at the Paralympic Games. Kotter was awarded the gold medal in the Columbia round open event. He scored 586 points. Kotter also participated in the Columbia round team open event along with archers, Bob Hawkes and George Pasipanki, being awarded the gold medal. His team scored 1706 points.
