= Bob Hawkes (swimmer) =

American Paralympian (1921–2012)

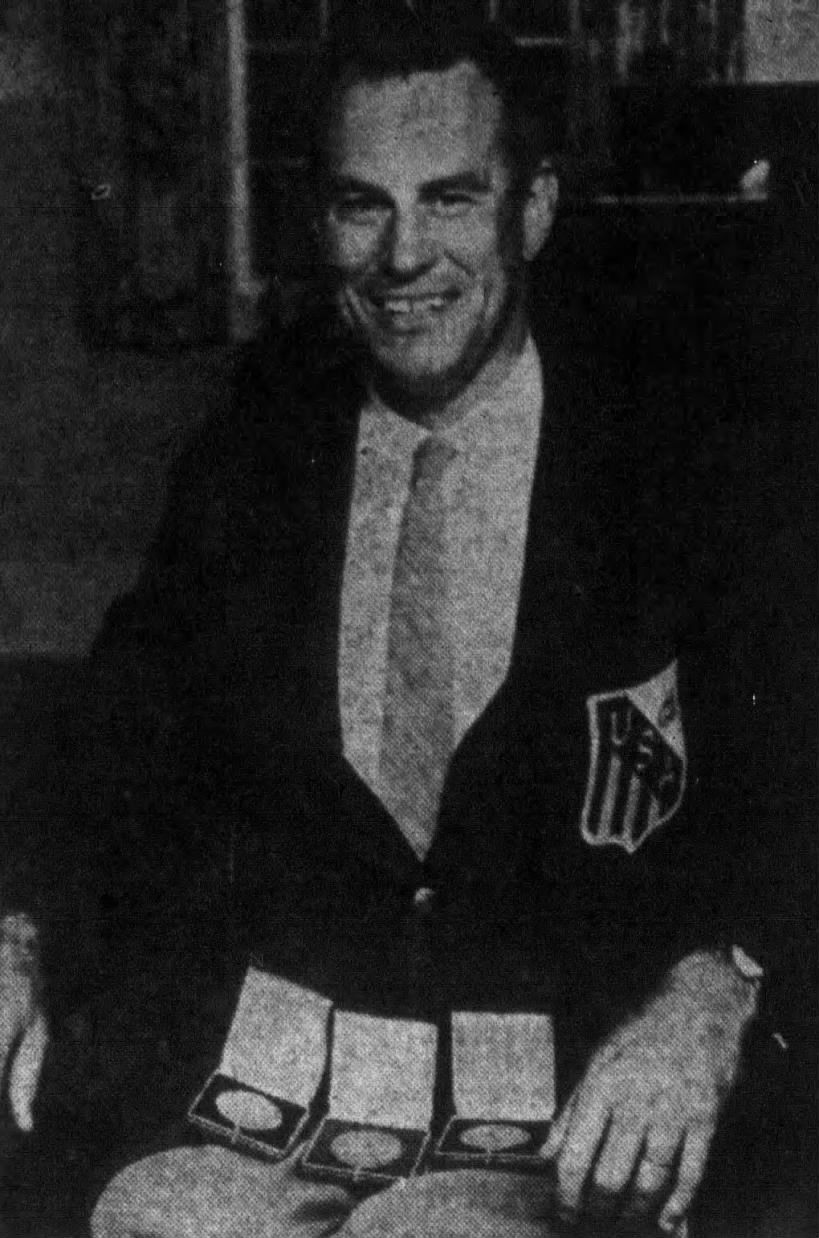
- Hawkes in 1960

Personal information
- Born: October 23, 1921 Biwabik, Minnesota, U.S.
- Died: July 15, 2012 (aged 90)

Sport
- Country: United States
- Sport: Archery; Para-athletics; Swimming; Wheelchair basketball
- Disability class: C1 (Note: Hawkes competed in Class 1 in 1964)
Medal record
Representing United States
Paralympic Games
Archery
Gold medal – first place	1964 Tokyo	Men's columbia round team open
Swimming
Bronze medal – third place	1960 Rome	Men's 50 m crawl complete class 3
Silver medal – second place	1960 Rome	Men's 50 m backstroke complete class 3
Gold medal – first place	1960 Rome	Men's 50 m breaststroke complete class 3
Wheelchair basketball
Gold medal – first place	1960 Rome	Men’s wheelchair basketball tournament A

Bob Hawkes (October 23, 1921 – July 15, 2012), also known as Robert C. Hawkes, was an American paralympic archer, athlete, swimmer and wheelchair basketball player. He competed at the 1960, 1964 and 1968 Summer Paralympics.

== Life and career ==
Hawkes was born in Biwabik, Minnesota. He served in the Army Air Corps during World War II.

Hawkes was superintendent of Opportunity Farm For Boys during the 1960s.

Hawkes competed at the 1960 Summer Paralympics, winning two gold medals, a silver medal and a bronze medal in swimming and wheelchair basketball. He then competed at the 1964 Summer Paralympics, winning a gold medal in the men's Columbia round team open event in archery.

Hawkes died on July 15, 2012 at the age of 90.
