= Christa Welger =

German-born wheelchair athlete (1939–2019)

- Christa Welger, from a 1962 publication

Personal information
- Born: Christa E. Zander; June 1939 Berlin
- Died: May 30, 2019 (aged 79) New Jersey
- Occupation: Athlete
- Years active: 1958-1963
- Spouse: Saul Welger (m. 1962; died 2002)

Sport
- Country: United States; West Germany
- Sport: Para athletics; Para archery; Para swimming; Para table tennis
Medal record
Stoke Mandeville Games
Representing West Germany
Athletics
Gold medal – first place	1958 Stoke Mandeville	Club Throw
Gold medal – first place	1961 Stoke Mandeville	Javelin
Gold medal – first place	1961 Stoke Mandeville	Shot Put
Gold medal – first place	1961 Stoke Mandeville	Javelin
Gold medal – first place	1962 Stoke Mandeville	Club Throw
Gold medal – first place	1962 Stoke Mandeville	Shot Put
Gold medal – first place	1962 Stoke Mandeville	Javelin
Gold medal – first place	1962 Stoke Mandeville	Discus
Swimming
Gold medal – first place	1958 Stoke Mandeville	40m Crawl
Gold medal – first place	1958 Stoke Mandeville	40m Breaststroke
Gold medal – first place	1958 Stoke Mandeville	40m Backstroke
Gold medal – first place	1959 Stoke Mandeville	40m Backstroke
Gold medal – first place	1959 Stoke Mandeville	40m Crawl
Gold medal – first place	1959 Stoke Mandeville	40m Breaststroke
Gold medal – first place	1961 Stoke Mandeville	50m Backstroke
Gold medal – first place	1961 Stoke Mandeville	50m Breaststroke
Gold medal – first place	1961 Stoke Mandeville	50m Crawl
Gold medal – first place	1962 Stoke Mandeville	50m Backstroke
Gold medal – first place	1962 Stoke Mandeville	50m Crawl
Gold medal – first place	1962 Stoke Mandeville	50m Breaststroke
Table tennis
Silver medal – second place	1958 Stoke Mandeville	Doubles
Paralympic Games
Representing West Germany
Athletics
Gold medal – first place	1960 Rome	Shot Put
Gold medal – first place	1960 Rome	Javelin
Gold medal – first place	1960 Rome	Club Throw
Archery
Bronze medal – third place	1960 Rome	Archery
Swimming
Gold medal – first place	1960 Rome	50m Crawl
Gold medal – first place	1960 Rome	50m Backstroke
Gold medal – first place	1960 Rome	50m Breaststroke
Table tennis
Bronze medal – third place	1960 Rome	Doubles
Representing United States
Athletics
Gold medal – first place	1964 Tokyo	Club Throw
Silver medal – second place	1964 Tokyo	Javelin
Bronze medal – third place	1964 Tokyo	Wheelchair Dash
Swimming
Silver medal – second place	1964 Tokyo	50m Backstroke
Silver medal – second place	1964 Tokyo	50m Breaststroke
Bronze medal – third place	1964 Tokyo	50m Freestyle

Christa Zander Welger (June 1939 – May 30, 2019) was a German-born wheelchair athlete. She represented West Germany and later the United States in various international events.

== Early life ==
Christa Zander was raised in Berlin during World War II, and then in West Berlin after the city was partitioned. She was paralyzed by polio at a young age, and developed physical strength in sports, including swimming and field events.

== Career ==
As a young woman, Zander belonged to the Handicapped Sports League of Berlin, and worked in a factory. She represented West Germany at the 1958 and 1959 Stoke Mandeville Games. She won eight medals at the 1960 Summer Paralympic Games in Rome. As Christa Welger, she represented the United States as a swimmer and field athlete at the Stoke Mandeville Games in 1962, and at 1964 Summer Paralympics in Tokyo, where she won a gold medal and three silver medals. She also competed at the National Wheelchair Games in 1963. She was inducted into the Adaptive Sports USA Hall of Fame in 1986.

== Personal life and legacy ==
Zander married American accountant and wheelchair athlete Saul Welger in 1962, and moved to New York to live with him. They had two children, born in 1966 and 1970. She was widowed when Saul died in 2002; she died in 2019. After her death, the Christa & Saul Welger Foundation was established, to continue their work in supporting sports opportunities for physically disabled youth.
