= Snooker at the 1964 Summer Paralympics =

Snooker at the II Paralympic Games
- Venue: National Gymnasium, Tokyo
- Dates: 9–12 November 1964

Medalists
1st place, gold medalist(s)		Michael Shelton	Great Britain
2nd place, silver medalist(s)		Frank Vecera	United States
3rd place, bronze medalist(s)		Claude Markham	Malta
3rd place, bronze medalist(s)		George Portelli	Malta

Snooker at the 1964 Summer Paralympics consisted of a men's event. It was held at the National Gymnasium, Tokyo from 9 to 12 November 1964.

The official Paralympics website states that there were four competitors, from three different countries: two from Malta, and one each from Great Britain and the United States. Ian Brittain's history of the Paralympic Games mentions a further competitor, Hugh Stewart, as a member of the Great Britain team for both snooker and table tennis.

Michael Shelton won the gold medal. Following this, he was filmed for Mining Review 18th Year No.5 (1965).

== Medal summary ==
Event	Gold	Silver	Bronze
Men paraplegics - open	Michael Shelton; Great Britain	Frank Vecera; United States	Claude Markham; Malta
Men paraplegics - open	Michael Shelton; Great Britain	Frank Vecera; United States	George Portelli; Malta
