= Susan Cunliffe-Lister, Baroness Masham of Ilton =

British politician and life peer (1935–2023)

The Right Honourable The Countess of Swinton DL
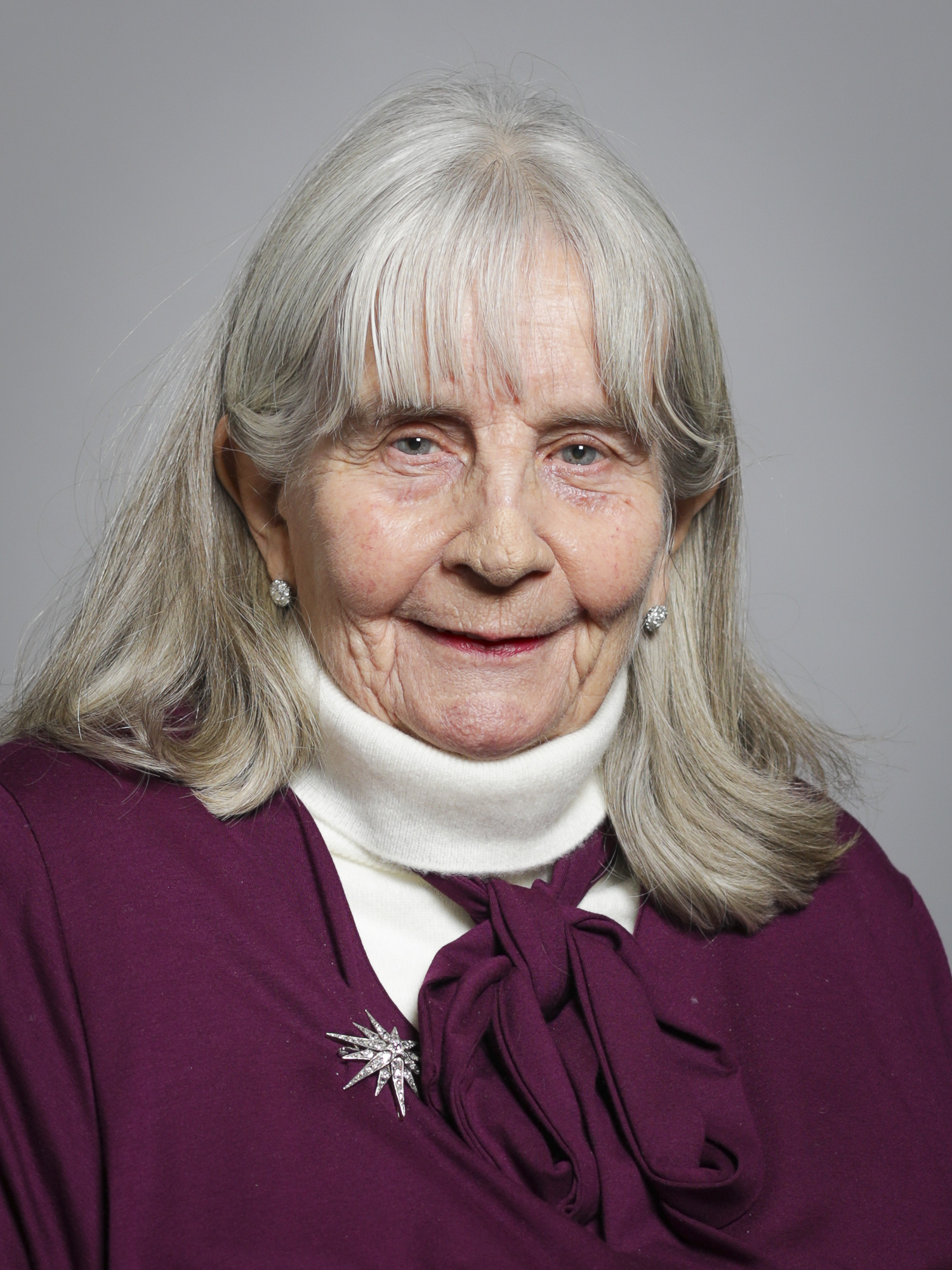
- Official portrait, 2019

Member of the House of Lords
- Lord Temporal
- Life peerage 25 February 1970 – 12 March 2023

Personal details
- Born: Susan Lilian Primrose Sinclair; 14 April 1935
- Died: 12 March 2023 (aged 87) Northallerton, North Yorkshire, England
- Party: Crossbencher
- Spouse: David Cunliffe-Lister, 2nd Earl of Swinton (m. 1959; died 2006)
- Education: Royal Polytechnic Institution (now University of Westminster)
- Sports career
Medal record
Representing Great Britain
Paralympic Games
Para-swimming
Gold medal – first place	1960 Rome	25m breaststroke complete class 2
Silver medal – second place	1960 Rome	25m backstroke complete class 2
Silver medal – second place	1964 Tokyo	25m freestyle prone complete C2
Silver medal – second place	1964 Tokyo	25m freestyle supine complete C2
Silver medal – second place	1964 Tokyo	25m breaststroke complete C2
Table tennis
Gold medal – first place	1964 Tokyo	Women's doubles B
Silver medal – second place	1964 Tokyo	Women's singles B
Silver medal – second place	1968 Tel Aviv	Women's doubles B
Bronze medal – third place	1960 Rome	Women's doubles B
Bronze medal – third place	1968 Tel Aviv	Women's singles B

Susan Lilian Primrose Cunliffe-Lister, Countess of Swinton, Baroness Masham of Ilton, DL (née Sinclair; 14 April 1935 – 12 March 2023) was a British crossbench member of the House of Lords, disability campaigner and Paralympic athlete. She was the founder and life-long president of the Spinal Injuries Association. She was Vice President of the Snowdon Trust, founded by the Earl of Snowdon, which provides grants and scholarships for students with disabilities. Her 53 years' membership of the House of Lords was the longest of any female peer.

== Personal life ==
Susan Sinclair was born on 14 April 1935, as the daughter of Major Sir Ronald Sinclair, 8th Baronet. She was educated at Heathfield School and London Polytechnic (the Royal Polytechnic Institution).

In 1959 she married David Cunliffe-Lister, Lord Masham (1937–2006), who became Earl of Swinton in 1972. By this marriage, she became entitled to the honorifics Lady Masham, and, later, Countess of Swinton. She was created a life peer in the House of Lords in 1970 as the Baroness Masham of Ilton, of Masham in the North Riding of the County of York.

She was a prominent Roman Catholic convert and a patron of the Margaret Beaufort Institute of Theology.

She and her husband (who died in 2006) adopted two children, Clare and Jessie.

She died on 12 March 2023 at Friarage Hospital, Northallerton. She was 87. A memorial service was held at Westminster Cathedral.

== Disability campaigner ==
Cunliffe-Lister sustained spinal cord injuries in 1958 in a riding accident, becoming paraplegic when she was 22 years old. Her rehabilitation took place at Stoke Mandeville Hospital, where she met Sir Ludwig Guttmann, the founder of the Paralympic movement.

In 1974 she founded the Spinal Injuries Association an organisation which supports and advocates for spinal cord injured people. She was the life-long President.

She was the subject of This Is Your Life in February 1976 when she was surprised by Eamonn Andrews in the foyer of the De Vere hotel in Kensington, London.

Cunliffe-Lister was an active member of the House of Lords, where she continued to be known as the Baroness Masham of Ilton, a title she held in her own right. In 1970 she was the youngest Life peer and became the longest running female peer with 53 years of service. She took a particular interest in disability rights, accessible public transport and accommodation, the added cost of living, rehabilitation, health including HIV/AIDS and Long Covid, and penal reform.

She opened the factory for Nordis Signs, part of the Kier Group, in Northampton, which employs a majority-disabled workforce. She continued to run the Masham Riding Centre in Masham, North Yorkshire until her death. Cunliffe-Lister was a longtime supporter of the charity Disability Action Yorkshire, becoming Patron in 2011.

Baroness Masham was President of the Chartered Society of Physiotherapy from 1975 to 1982. In 2011, she was awarded an Honorary Fellowship by the Royal College of Nursing.

== Paralympic career ==
Cunliffe-Lister competed in several Paralympic Games. At the inaugural Games in Rome in 1960, she won swimming gold and silver in the 25m breaststroke complete class 2 and 25m backstroke complete class 2 respectively, as well as bronze in the table tennis, women's doubles class B.

Four years later, at the 1964 Tokyo Paralympics, she won gold in the table tennis women's doubles B alongside Gwen Buck, and silver in the women's singles B. In the pool, Masham won three silver medals, in the 25m freestyle prone complete C2, 25m freestyle supine complete C2, and 25m breaststroke complete C2.

At the 1968 Tel Aviv Paralympics, Masham added table tennis silver in the women's doubles B with Buck, and bronze in the women's singles B.

== Sources ==
- Masham Riding Centre
- 2nd Earl of Swinton, DL (1937-2006) – Google Peerage News Group

Honorary titles
Preceded by The Lord Chalfont	Senior life peer 2020–2023	Succeeded by The Lord Tanlaw
