= Pauline Foulds =

British swimmer

Sport
- Country: United Kingdom
- Sport: Paralympic swimming
Medal record
Paralympic Games (incomplete)
Swimming
Gold medal – first place	1960 Rome	Women's 50 m Crawl Complete class 4
Gold medal – first place	1960 Rome	Women's 50 m Backstroke Complete class 4
Gold medal – first place	1964 Tokyo	Women's 50 m Freestyle Supine Complete class 4
Gold medal – first place	1964 Tokyo	Women's 50 m Breaststroke Complete class 4
Gold medal – first place	1964 Tokyo	Women's 50 m Freestyle Prone Complete class 4

Pauline Foulds is a retired British swimmer who won five Paralympic gold medals representing Great Britain. Foulds, who was injured in a riding accident and paralysed from the waist down, won two golds in the 1960 Summer Paralympics in Rome and then three gold medals in Tokyo 1964.
