= Dean Slaugh =

American paralympic archer

Personal information
- Born: March 29, 1929 Vernal, Utah, U.S.
- Died: April 13, 2009 (aged 80) United States

Sport
- Country: United States
- Sport: Archery
- Disability: Paraplegia
Medal record
Representing United States
Paralympic Games
Archery
Gold medal – first place	1964 Tokyo	Albion round open
Gold medal – first place	1964 Tokyo	Albion round team open
Gold medal – first place	1964 Tokyo	FITA round open
Gold medal – first place	1964 Tokyo	FITA round team open

Dean Slaugh (March 29, 1929 – April 13, 2009) was an American paralympic archer. He competed at the 1964 Summer Paralympics.

== Biography ==
Slaugh was born in Vernal, Utah, and later lived in Garden Grove, California. He was injured in the Korean War. He competed in the archery events at the 1964 Summer Paralympics. Slaugh won individual gold medals in the albion round open event and FITA round open event. He was also a member of the gold-winning teams in the albion round team open event (with Dick Robinson and Jack Whitman), and the FITA round team open event (with Jim Mathis and Jack Whitman).
