= Evelyn Mulry Moore =

American athlete (1942–2012)

- Evelyn Mulry, from a 1957 newspaper
- Born: Evelyn Marie Mulry; October 20, 1942; Brooklyn, New York, U.S.
- Died: December 17, 2012 (aged 70); Titusville, Florida, U.S.
- Occupation: Wheelchair athlete
- Known for: Medalist at 1964 and 1968 Summer Paralympic Games; National Wheelchair Athletic Association Hall of Fame inductee (1978)

Evelyn Marie Mulry Moore (October 20, 1942 – December 17, 2012) was an American athlete who won two gold medals in swimming events at the 1964 Summer Paralympics in Tokyo and a gold and two silver medals at the 1968 Summer Paralympics in Tel Aviv. She also competed in field events at the National Wheelchair Games in the 1960s and 1970s. She was inducted into the National Wheelchair Athletic Association Hall of Fame in 1978.

== Early life and education ==
Evelyn Marie Mulry was born in Brooklyn and raised in Port Washington, New York, the daughter of Philip Mulry and Gertrude Elizabeth Jones Mulry. Her father was a lawyer. She was a Girl Scout and played basketball in high school. She graduated from St. Mary's High School in Manhasset, New York in 1960.

In 1961, at age 18, Mulry was paralyzed in a car accident, and spent almost a year learning to live with quadriplegia at the Rusk Institute of Rehabilitation Medicine. She started college at Pace University before the accident, and transferred the University of Illinois at Urbana-Champaign, starting in 1963.

== Career ==
At the University of Illinois, Mulry became a member of the school's disabled students' organization, Delta Sigma Omicron, and the Gizz Kids wheelchair sports program. She competed in swimming and table tennis events in the 1964 Summer Paralympics in Tokyo, and at the 1968 Summer Paralympics in Tel Aviv. She won two gold medals in Tokyo, and another gold plus two silver medals at Tel Aviv.

Moore also competed at the National Wheelchair Games in 1964, 1965, 1967, 1969, 1975, 1976, and 1978. She entered bowling and field events (discus, shot put, javelin). She was inducted into the National Wheelchair Athletic Association Hall of Fame in 1978, in the same induction group as B. Cairbre McCann and Julius Duval.

Moore worked for 17 years as an administrator at the State of Illinois Department of Public Aid in Champaign. She retired to Florida in 1986.

== Personal life ==
Mulry married Richard Eugene Moore in 1965. They had a son, Justin (Judd); she also helped to raise her husband's children from an earlier marriage. She was widowed when Richard died in 2001; she died in Titusville, Florida in 2012, aged 70 years.
