= Sweden at the 1964 Summer Paralympics =

- IPC code: SWE
- NPC: Swedish Parasports Federation

in Tokyo
- Medals Ranked 17th: Gold 0 Silver 0 Bronze 1 Total 1

Summer Paralympics appearances (overview)
- 1960; 1964; 1968; 1972; 1976; 1980; 1984; 1988; 1992; 1996; 2000; 2004; 2008; 2012; 2016; 2020; 2024

Sweden sent a delegation to compete at the 1964 Summer Paralympics in Tokyo, Japan. Its athletes finished seventeenth in the overall medal count.

== Medalists ==
Medal	Name	Sport	Event
Bronze	Eric Johansson	Archery	Men's FITA round open

Medals by sport
Sport	Gold medal	Silver medal	Bronze medal	Total
Archery	0	0	1	1
Total	0	0	1	1

== See also ==
- 1964 Summer Paralympics medal table
- Sweden at the 1964 Summer Olympics
