= Austria at the 1964 Summer Paralympics =

- IPC code: AUT
- NPC: Austrian Paralympic Committee
- Website: www.oepc.at (in German)

in Tokyo
- Medals Ranked 12th: Gold 4 Silver 1 Bronze 7 Total 12

Summer Paralympics appearances (overview)
- 1960; 1964; 1968; 1972; 1976; 1980; 1984; 1988; 1992; 1996; 2000; 2004; 2008; 2012; 2016; 2020; 2024

Austria sent a delegation to compete at the 1964 Summer Paralympics in Tokyo, Japan. Its athletes finished twelfth in the overall medal count.

== Medalists ==
Medal	Name	Sport	Event
Gold	R. Kuhnel	Swimming	Women's 25m freestyle prone complete class 2
Gold	R. Kuhnel	Swimming	Women's 25m freestyle supine complete class 2
Gold	R. Kuhnel	Swimming	Women's 25m breaststroke complete class 2
Gold	R. Kuhnel	Table tennis	Women's singles B
Silver	I. Driessler	Athletics	Women's shot put A
Bronze	Josef Jager	Swimming	Men's 25m breaststroke complete class 2
Bronze	I. Driessler	Swimming	Women's 50m freestyle prone complete class 3
Bronze	I. Driessler	Swimming	Women's 50m freestyle supine complete class 3
Bronze	Engelbert Rangger	Table tennis	Men's singles B
Bronze	E. Fliessar	Table tennis	Men's singles B
Bronze	E. Fliessar; Engelbert Rangger	Table tennis	Men's doubles B
Bronze	I. Driessler; R. Kuhnel	Table tennis	Women's doubles B

== See also ==
- Austria at the Paralympics
- Austria at the 1964 Summer Olympics
