= David Ellis (swimmer) =

British Paralympic swimmer

Sport
- Country: United Kingdom
- Sport: Paralympic swimming
Medal record
Paralympic Games
| Gold medal – first place | 1964 Tokyo | Men's 25 m Freestyle Prone complete class 2 |
| Gold medal – first place | 1964 Tokyo | Men's 25 m Freestyle Supine complete class 2 |
| Gold medal – first place | 1968 Tel Aviv | Men's 25 m Backstroke complete class 2 |
| Gold medal – first place | 1968 Tel Aviv | Men's 25 m Breaststroke complete class 2 |
| Gold medal – first place | 1972 Heideberg | Men's 25 m Breaststroke 2 |
| Silver medal – second place | 1964 Tokyo | Men's 25 m Breaststroke complete class 2 |
| Silver medal – second place | 1968 Tel Aviv | Men's 25 m Freestyle complete class 2 |

David Ellis is a retired British swimmer who won five Paralympic gold medals. He was the highest performing British athlete at the 1968 Summer Paralympics in Tel Aviv, winning two golds and a silver.
