= Wheelchair basketball at the 1960 Summer Paralympics =

Wheelchair basketball at the I Paralympic Games
- Paralympic Wheelchair Basketball

Medalists
1st place, gold medalist(s)		United States (USA) (men class A); United States (USA) (men class B)
2nd place, silver medalist(s)		Great Britain (GBR) (men class A); Netherlands (NED) (men class B)
3rd place, bronze medalist(s)		Israel (ISR) (men class A); Great Britain (GBR) (men class B)

Wheelchair basketball at the 1960 Summer Paralympics consisted of two men's tournaments. One for athletes with complete lesion paraplegia, and one for athletes with incomplete paraplegia.

== Medal summary ==
Event	Gold	Silver	Bronze
Men's class A	United States (USA)	Great Britain (GBR)	Israel (ISR)
Men's class B	United States (USA)	Netherlands (NED)	Great Britain (GBR)

Source: Paralympic.org

== Class A (incomplete) ==
- Monday: USA 32 - 10 Austria
- Tuesday: USA 17 - 8 Israel

=== Rosters A ===
- USA:
  - Frank Vecera, East St. Louis, Ill
  - William Johnson, Long Beach Calif.
  - Percy Mabee, Brooklyn, N.Y.
  - Richard Maduro, Madeira Beach, Fla.
  - Philip Hall, Indianapolis, Ind.

== Class B (incomplete) ==
- Monday: USA 37 - 6 Belgium

=== Rosters B ===
- USA:
  - Ron Stein (age 22), Champaign, Ill.
  - Paul Jones (age 23), Montgommery, Pa.
  - Don Kennedy (age 27), Jackson Heights, N.Y.
  - Bruce Karr (age 23), Addison, Ill
  - Saul Welger (age 29), Brooklyn, N.Y.
  - Anderson McCullough (age 25), Waukegan, Ill.
  - Randy Dagis (age 21), Rockford Ill.
  - Wayne Broeren (age 26), Champaign, Ill.
  - Peter Acca (age 31), Brooklyn, N.Y.

== Participating nations A, B (incomplete) ==
- Australia
- Austria
- Belgium
- Great Britain
- Israel
- Netherlands (Holland)
- USA

http://www.nwba.org/news_article/show/540705?referrer_id=2077043

== See also ==
- Basketball at the 1960 Summer Olympics
