= Ella Chafee =

American Athlete

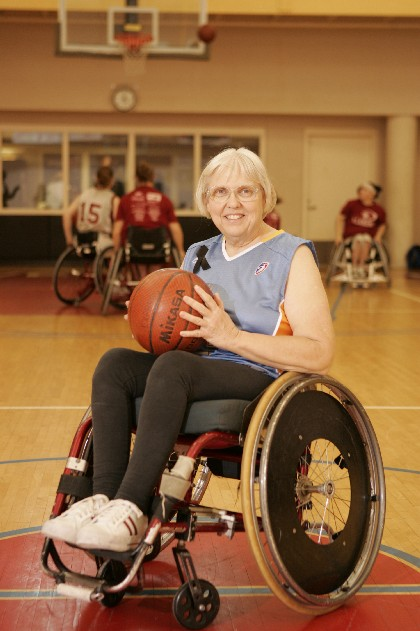
- Chafee in 2008

Personal information
- Born: March 4, 1945 Chicago, Illinois, United States
- Died: June 16, 2019 (aged 74) Oak Lawn, Illinois, United States
- Education: University of Illinois
- Height: 5 ft 2 in (157 cm)

Sport
- Sport: Wheelchair fencing; Wheelchair basketball; Para Swimming; Wheelchair slalom; Wheelchair racing
- Disability: Polio
- Club: Chicago Charmers, Ryan AbilityLab (Formerly Rehab Institute of Chicago) Express/Sky
Medal record
Representing United States
Paralympic Games
Paralympic swimming
Silver medal – second place	1964 Tokyo	50m freestyle supine class 3
Silver medal – second place	1964 Tokyo	50m freestyle prone class 3
Paralympic athletics
Gold medal – first place	1968 Tel Aviv	Women's 4x40m relay open
Wheelchair fencing
Bronze medal – third place	1964 Tokyo	Women's foil team
Wheelchair basketball
Bronze medal – third place	1968 Tel Aviv	Women's tournament

Ella Chafee née Cox (March 4, 1945 – June 16, 2019) was an American wheelchair basketball player and wheelchair fencer who competed at three Paralympic Games. She also took part in track and field and swimming.

== Sporting career ==
Chafee contracted polio when she was six years old during the 1950s. She took part in wheelchair racing in the early 1960s as well as wheelchair basketball. She and her sister-in-law Hope Chafee, who also has polio, both took part in the 1964 Summer Paralympics where Ella won two medals in swimming and Hope won three medals. Ella participated in the 1968 Summer Paralympics and won the gold medal in the women's 4x40m relay. Ella returned to the Games in 1996 as a wheelchair fencer.

In 1979, Chafee took part in the Boston Marathon in the wheelchair division.

Chafee was inducted into the National Wheelchair Athletic Association (now Move United) Hall of Fame in 1990 and the National Wheelchair Basketball Association Hall of Fame in 2014.

== Death ==
Chafee died of a liver aneurysm aged 74 at a hospital in Oak Lawn on June 16, 2019.
