= Fujio Watanabe =

Japanese para table tennis player

Personal information
- Born: 1939 (age 86–87) Kaneyama, Fukushima, Japan

Sport
- Sport: Table tennis
Medal record
Men's para table tennis
Representing Japan
Paralympic Games
Gold medal – first place	1964 Tokyo	Doubles C

Fujio Watanabe (渡部 藤男, Watanabe Fujio; born c. 1939) is a Japanese former para table tennis player. He and his doubles partner Yasunori Igari won Japan's first ever Paralympic gold medal at the 1964 Summer Paralympics.

When he was 22 years old, he had a spinal cord injury while unloading a log from a truck.
