= Michal Escapa =

Istraeli Paralympic multi-sport athlete

Personal information
- Native name: מיכל אסקפה
- National team: Israel
- Born: 1937 (age 88–89)

Sport
- Country: Israel
- Sport: Para swimming; Para table tennis; Para archery; Wheelchair basketball
- Disability: Poliomyelitis
Medal record
Event / 1st / 2nd / 3rd; Paralympic Games / 2 / 1 / 4
Representing Israel
Paralympic Games
Table tennis
Gold medal – first place	1976 Toronto	Singles 1C
Silver medal – second place	1968 Tel Aviv	Singles B
Bronze medal – third place	1964 Tokyo	Singles B
Bronze medal – third place	1972 Heidelberg	Singles 3
Swimming
Bronze medal – third place	1964 Tokyo	25m breaststroke
Bronze medal – third place	1964 Tokyo	25m freestyle
Wheelchair basketball
Gold medal – first place	1968 Tel Aviv	Wheelchair basketball
Stoke Mandeville Games
Table tennis
Gold medal – first place	1969	Singles

Michal Escapa (Hebrew: מיכל אסקפה; born 1937) is a former Israeli Paralympic champion.

== Biography ==
Escapa was born in France, immigrating to Israel as an orphan after the Second World War. At the age of 15 she was affected by polio and paralyzed in both legs and one of her arms. She studied in Jerusalem and was certified as an accountant, moving in 1962 to live in Holon and practice sports at the Israel Sports Center for the Disabled.

The national champion in wheelchair table tennis, Escapa competed in the Stoke Mandeville Games and in all four Summer Paralympics from 1964 to 1976. An accomplished table tennis player, she won a medal in each games: Gold in 1976, silver in 1968 and bronze in 1964 and 1972. During the 1972 Summer Paralympics she also competed in archery, finishing before last.

=== The wrong reports ===
Since at the dawn of the Paralympic Games there was no precision in reporting the results of the competitions, the Israeli athlete was indicated with the Italian nationality and without prename (and so she is mentioned in the International Paralympic Committee of the Italian Paralympic Committee web sites) for the reports of the Swimming at the 1964 Summer Paralympics where she won two bronze medals, simply reported as Escapa and not as Michal Escapa. However, as can be seen from a 1968 Israeli newspaper reporting an interview with the athlete, she was the same athlete who had won medals in swimming and table tennis in Tokyo 1964.

== Achievements ==
Year	Competition	Venue	Rank	Event	Notes
Swimming
1964	Summer Paralympics	(Japan) Tokyo	3rd	25 m freestyle prone incomplete class 2	
1964	Summer Paralympics	(Japan) Tokyo	3rd	25 m breaststroke incomplete class 2	
Table tennis
1964	Summer Paralympics	(Japan) Tokyo	3rd	Singles B	
1968	Summer Paralympics	(Israel) Tel Aviv	2nd	Singles B	
1972	Summer Paralympics	(West Germany) Heidelberg	3rd	Singles 3	
1976	Summer Paralympics	(Canada) Toronto	1st	Singles 1C	
Wheelchair basketball
1968	Summer Paralympics	(Israel) Tel Aviv	1st	Team	

== See also ==
- French Jews in Israel
