= Valerie Robertson =

British Paralympic athlete

Personal information
- Born: Valerie Forder; 1943 (age 82–83)

Sport
- Country: United Kingdom
- Sport: Paralympic athletics, archery, swimming, and wheelchair fencing
Medal record
Paralympics
Swimming
Gold medal – first place	1964 Tokyo	Women's 50 m Freestyle Supine complete class 3
Gold medal – first place	1968 Tel Aviv	Women's 50 m Backstroke class 3 complete
Gold medal – first place	1968 Tel Aviv	Women's 50 m Breaststroke class 3 complete
Gold medal – first place	1968 Tel Aviv	Women's 50 m Freestyle class 3 complete
Silver medal – second place	1964 Tokyo	Women's 50 m Breaststroke complete class 3
Silver medal – second place	1964 Tokyo	Women's 50 m Freestyle Prone complete class 3
Athletics
Gold medal – first place	1968 Tel Aviv	Women's 60 m Wheelchair B
Gold medal – first place	1968 Tel Aviv	Women's Pentathlon complete
Bronze medal – third place	1964 Tokyo	Women's Discus C
Archery
Silver medal – second place	1964 Tokyo	Women's Albion Round open
Wheelchair fencing
Silver medal – second place	1964 Tokyo	Women's Foil Team
Bronze medal – third place	1976 Toronto	Women's Foil Novice Team

Valerie Robertson (née Forder; born 1943) is a British former Paralympic athlete who competed in archery, athletics, swimming, and wheelchair fencing, winning at least a silver medal in each. She won a total of six Paralympic gold medals at three Games. After completing her Paralympic career, Robertson had a very successful transition to wheelchair lawn bowling.

== Sporting career ==
Robertson, competing under her maiden name of Forder, participated in the 1964 Summer Paralympics and again in 1968. She entered four different sporting disciplines, winning at least a silver in each one.

At the 1964 Games, Robertson won a medal in all but one of the events in which she competed. She won gold in the 50m freestyle, along with two other swimming medals. She also received silver in the archery and wheelchair fencing, along with a bronze in the discus, only missing out on a medal in the club throw.

It was at the 1968 Games in Tel Aviv that Robertson achieved her greatest results, winning five gold medals out of the nine events in which she competed. Three medals came from 50m swimming events (the backstroke, breaststroke, and freestyle) with two further golds in athletics (the 60m wheelchair race and the pentathlon).

Robertson returned to the Paralympics at the 1976 Games in Toronto, competing under her married name. She entered three events, winning bronze in a wheelchair fencing team event.

Turning her attentions to lawn bowls, Robertson helped to improve wheelchair access to greens and a ramp to assist in the launch of the balls. She quickly became one of the leading female bowlers, hailed as one of the all-time best competitors in the Scottish Disability Sport National Bowls Championships. Alongside her husband John, Robertson is viewed as having a significant impact on Scottish disability bowls and they are credited with helping the country achieve international success in the sport.

== Personal life ==
Valerie Robertson was born in 1943 and is married to John Robertson, a Commonwealth Games gold medallist.
