= Anna Maria Toso =

Italian Paralympic athlete

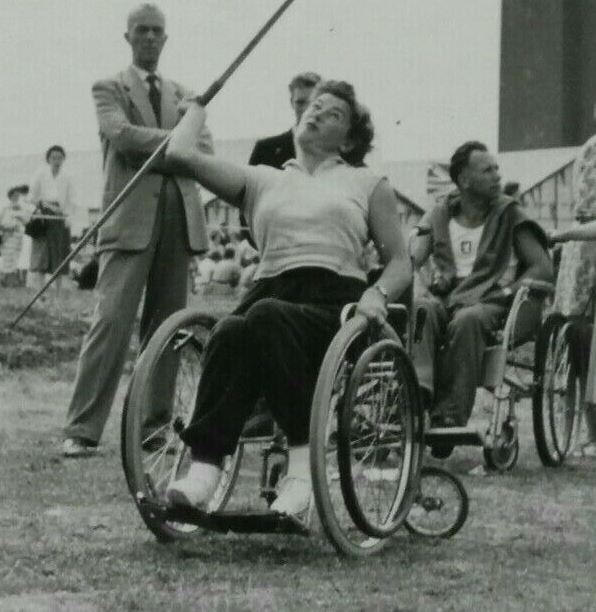
- Toso at the 1960 Summer Paralympics.

Personal information
- Nationality: Italian
- Born: Veneto, Italy

Sport
- Country: Italy
- Sport: Paralympic athletics Paralympic swimming Wheelchair fencing Para table tennis
Medal record
Event	1st	2nd	3rd
Paralympic Games	8	10	2

Anna Maria Toso is an Italian former paralympic athlete who won 20 medals (eight gold) in four different sports at the Summer Paralympics.

== Achievements ==
Year	Competition	Venue	Javelin throw A	Javelin throw B	Javelin throw C	Shot put A	Club throw A	Discus throw put A	25 m freestyle	25 m freestyle supine	25 m breaststroke	25 m backstroke	Foil individual	Foil team	Singles B	Double
Para athletics
1960	Summer Paralympics	(Italy) Rome	2nd place, silver medalist(s)	2nd place, silver medalist(s)	2nd place, silver medalist(s)	3rd place, bronze medalist(s)										
1964	Summer Paralympics	(Japan) Tokyo	1st place, gold medalist(s)			1st place, gold medalist(s)	2nd place, silver medalist(s)	2nd place, silver medalist(s)								
Para swimming
1960	Summer Paralympics	(Italy) Rome							1st place, gold medalist(s)		1st place, gold medalist(s)	2nd place, silver medalist(s)				
1964	Summer Paralympics	(Japan) Tokyo							2nd place, silver medalist(s)	1st place, gold medalist(s)	2nd place, silver medalist(s)					
Wheelchair fencing
1960	Summer Paralympics	(Italy) Rome											1st place, gold medalist(s)			
1964	Summer Paralympics	(Japan) Tokyo											1st place, gold medalist(s)	1st place, gold medalist(s)		
Para table tennis
1960	Summer Paralympics	(Italy) Rome													3rd place, bronze medalist(s)	2nd place, silver medalist(s)
1964	Summer Paralympics	(Japan) Tokyo														2nd place, silver medalist(s)

== See also ==
- Italy at the 1960 Summer Paralympics
- List of multiple Paralympic gold medalists at a single Games
- Italy at the Paralympics - Multiple medallists
