= Wheelchair basketball at the 1964 Summer Paralympics =

Wheelchair basketball at the II Paralympic Games
- Paralympic Wheelchair Basketball

Medalists
| 1st place, gold medalist(s) | | United States (USA) (men class A); United States (USA) (men class B) |
| 2nd place, silver medalist(s) | | Great Britain (GBR) (men class A); Argentina (ARG) (men class B) |
| 3rd place, bronze medalist(s) | | Israel (ISR) (men class A); Israel (ISR) (men class B) |

Wheelchair basketball at the 1964 Summer Paralympics consisted of two events for men.

== Medal summary ==
| Event | Gold | Silver | Bronze |
|---|---|---|---|
| Men's A complete | United States (USA) | Great Britain (GBR) | Israel (ISR) |
| Men's B incomplete | United States (USA) | Argentina (ARG) | Israel (ISR) |

Source: Paralympic.org

== See also ==
- Basketball at the 1964 Summer Olympics
