= Netherlands at the 1964 Summer Paralympics =

- Flag of the Netherlands
- IPC code: NED (NLD used at these Games)
- NPC: Nederlands Olympisch Comité * Nederlandse Sport Federatie
- Website: paralympisch.nl (in Dutch)

in Tokyo
- Competitors: 11 (7 men, 4 women)
- Medals Ranked 10th: Gold 4 Silver 6 Bronze 4 Total 14

Summer Paralympics appearances (overview)
- 1960; 1964; 1968; 1972; 1976; 1980; 1984; 1988; 1992; 1996; 2000; 2004; 2008; 2012; 2016; 2020; 2024

Netherlands competed at the 1964 Summer Paralympics in Tokyo, Japan. The team included 8 athletes, 5 men and 3 women. Competitors from Netherlands won 14 medals, including 4 gold, 6 silver and 4 bronze to finish 10th in the medal table.

== Medalists ==
Medal	Name	Sport	Event
Gold	Elka Gaarlandt	Swimming	Women's 50 m Breaststroke complete class 3
Gold	Cor Prins	Swimming	Men's 50 m Freestyle Prone special class
Gold	Cor Prins	Swimming	Men's 50 m Freestyle Supine special class
Gold	Gerard Jacobs; Marion de Groot	Table tennis	Men's Doubles A1
Silver	Peter Blanker	Archery	Men's Albion Round open
Silver	Peter Blanker	Archery	Men's FITA Round open
Silver	Elka Gaarlandt	Athletics	Women's Slalom open
Silver	Marion de Groot	Swimming	Women's 25 m Freestyle Supine complete class 1
Silver	Dik Kruidenier	Swimming	Men's 50 m Freestyle Prone cauda equina
Silver	Gerard Jacobs	Table tennis	Men's Singles A1
Bronze	E. O'Brien	Athletics	Women's Slalom open
Bronze	Marion de Groot	Swimming	Women's 25 m Freestyle Supine incomplete class 1
Bronze	Dik Kruidenier	Swimming	Men's 50 m Breaststroke complete class 5
Bronze	Marion de Groot	Table tennis	Men's Singles A1

Source: www.paralympic.org & www.olympischstadion.nl

== Competitors ==
A team of 7 men and 3 women were announced in the newspaper on 23 October 1964. In the newspaper of 20 November (after the Paralympics) was written "ten became eleven".

The name of the 11th person was not named.

Men

- Popke Popkema
- Peter Blanker
- Gerard Jacobs
- Piet Imming
- Dik Kruidenier
- Cor Prins
- Yap Soem Lie

Women

- Marion de Groot
- Elka Gaarlandt
- Cissy Morel

== Archery ==
The Dutch team consisted of three archers.

- 2x (silver) Peter Blanker
- Popke Popkema
- 7th - Geert Imming

== See also ==
- Netherlands at the Paralympics
- Netherlands at the 1964 Summer Olympics
