= Switzerland at the 1964 Summer Paralympics =

- IPC code: SUI (SWI used at these Games)
- NPC: Swiss Paralympic Committee
- Website: www.swissparalympic.ch

in Tokyo
- Medals Ranked 15th: Gold 0 Silver 1 Bronze 0 Total 1

Summer Paralympics appearances (overview)
- 1960; 1964; 1968; 1972; 1976; 1980; 1984; 1988; 1992; 1996; 2000; 2004; 2008; 2012; 2016; 2020; 2024

Switzerland sent a delegation to compete at the 1964 Summer Paralympics in Tokyo, Japan. Its athletes finished fifteenth in the overall medal count.

== Medalist ==
Medal	Name	Sport	Event
(silver) Silver	Caroline Troxler-Kung	Archery	Women's St. Nicholas Round Open

== See also ==
- 1964 Summer Paralympics medal table
- Switzerland at the 1964 Summer Olympics
