= Daniel Erasmus =

South African athlete

Personal information
- Nationality: South African

Sport
- Sport: Athletics; Lawn bowls

Daniel Erasmus is a South African athlete who won twelve medals at the Paralympic Games.

At the 1964 Summer Paralympics in Tokyo, Japan, Erasmus competed in athletics and medalled in all four of his events, taking gold in the discus and shot put and silver in the club throw and javelin. At the 1968 games in Tel Aviv, Israel, he took part in five athletics events and medalled in four, taking gold in shot put and javelin and silver in club throw and discus. He also competed in lawn bowls that year, winning the singles event and taking second in pairs. His last Paralympic appearance was at the 1972 games in Heidelberg, West Germany, where he took silver in shot put and bronze in javelin.
