= France at the 1964 Summer Paralympics =

- IPC code: FRA
- NPC: French Paralympic and Sports Committee
- Website: france-paralympique.fr

in Tokyo
- Competitors: 13 in 5 sports
- Medals Ranked 11th: Gold 4 Silver 2 Bronze 5 Total 11

Summer Paralympics appearances (overview)
- 1960; 1964; 1968; 1972; 1976; 1980; 1984; 1988; 1992; 1996; 2000; 2004; 2008; 2012; 2016; 2020; 2024

France sent a delegation to compete at the 1964 Summer Paralympics in Tokyo, Japan. The French athletes finished eleventh in the overall medal count.

== Medalists ==
Belgium and France both sent one athlete each to form a team for dartchery mixed pairs open. This team finished third and a bronze medal was attributed to both countries in the medal table.

Medal	Name	Sport	Event
Gold	René David; Ilanoun; Roger Schuh	Archery	Men's St. Nicholas round team open
Gold	Serge Bec	Wheelchair fencing	Men's épée individual
Gold	Serge Bec	Wheelchair fencing	Men's sabre individual
Gold	Serge Bec; Michel Foucre; Aimé Planchon	Wheelchair fencing	Men's sabre team
Silver	Lercerf; Musy; Seguin	Archery	Men's Columbia round team open
Silver	Serge Bec; Michel Foucre; Aimé Planchon	Wheelchair fencing	Men's épée team
Bronze	René David	Archery	Men's St. Nicholas round open
Bronze	Jacques Biron	Athletics	Men's slalom open
Bronze	Pesnaud; Raymond Schelfaut	Dartchery	Mixed pairs open
Bronze	Aimé Planchon	Swimming	Women's 50m breaststroke incomplete class 3
Bronze	Aimé Planchon	Wheelchair fencing	Men's sabre individual

== See also ==
- France at the Paralympics
- France at the 1964 Summer Olympics
