= Batia Mishani =

Israeli Paralympic competitor

Personal information
- Native name: בתיה משעני
- Born: 1945
- Died: 1996 (aged 50–51)

Sport
- Country: Israel
Medal record
Event / 1st / 2nd / 3rd; Paralympic Games / 4 / 5 / 3
Representing Israel
Summer Paralympic Games
Athletics
Gold medal – first place	1964 Tokyo	Javelin D
Gold medal – first place	1968 Tel Aviv	Novices 60m C
Silver medal – second place	1968 Tel Aviv	Club throw D
Silver medal – second place	1968 Tel Aviv	Shot put D
Silver medal – second place	1968 Tel Aviv	Javelin D
Silver medal – second place	1968 Tel Aviv	4X40m Open
Bronze medal – third place	1964 Tokyo	Shot put D
Table tennis
Silver medal – second place	1964 Tokyo	Singles C
Bronze medal – third place	1964 Tokyo	Doubles C
Bronze medal – third place	1968 Tel Aviv	Singles C
Swimming
Gold medal – first place	1964 Tokyo	50m freestyle
Wheelchair basketball
Gold medal – first place	1968 Tel Aviv	wheelchair basketball

Batia Mishani (Hebrew: בתיה משעני) was an Israeli athlete. Between 1964 and 1968, she competed for Team Israel at the Paralympic Games, winning a total of four gold medals, five silver medals, and three bronze medals before retiring.
