= South Africa at the 1964 Summer Paralympics =

- IPC code: RSA (SAF used at these Games)
- NPC: South African Sports Confederation and Olympic Committee
- Website: www.sascoc.co.za

in Tokyo
- Competitors: 9 in 4 sports
- Medals Ranked 6th: Gold 8 Silver 8 Bronze 3 Total 19

Summer Paralympics appearances (overview)
- 1964; 1968; 1972; 1976; 1980–1988; 1992; 1996; 2000; 2004; 2008; 2012; 2016; 2020; 2024

South Africa made its Paralympic Games début at the 1964 Summer Paralympics in Tokyo, Japan and finished 6th on the medal table.

It sent nine athletes to compete in archery, athletics, swimming and weightlifting. They finished sixth on the medal table with nineteen medals, of which eight were gold. Paradoxically, South Africa began to compete at the Paralympics after being refused participation at the Olympics, held in Tokyo the same summer, after refusing to send a single, multiracial team as demanded by the IOC, following the passing of United Nations General Assembly Resolution 1761 in 1962 (which condemned the country's policy of apartheid). The country refused to acquiesce and was, thus, absent from the 1964 Summer Olympics.

The winners of its eight gold medals were G.P. Marais in archery (Men's St. Nicholas Round open), I. Marinowitz in archery (Women's St. Nicholas Round open), Daniel Erasmus in athletics (Men's Discus A and Men's Shot Put A), M. Forty in discus (Women's Club Throw B and Women's Discus B), A. Somerset in swimming (Women's 25 m Breaststroke incomplete class 1), and B. Humble in weightlifting (Men's Middleweight).
