= Ron Stein =

American wheelchair basketball player (1937–2010)

Ronald Arthur "Ron" Stein (September 27, 1937 – February 16, 2010) was an American athlete who competed at the inaugural Summer Paralympic Games held in Rome in 1960.

== Early life ==
Stein, the only child of Arthur and Edith (née Goehler) Stein, was born on September 27, 1937, in East St. Louis. He lived in O'Fallon, Illinois throughout his life.

He attended O'Fallon Township High School, from where he graduated in 1955. During his time at school he played basketball and baseball, and participated in track and field events. Following high school, Stein planned to begin workouts with the Chicago White Sox, then continue his education at Northwestern University.

While training with the White Sox, Stein became ill with polio; the disease left him requiring the use of a wheelchair. He entered a rehabilitation program at the University of Illinois in 1956 and became involved in competitive wheelchair sports, including basketball, athletics and football.

== Paralympic Games ==
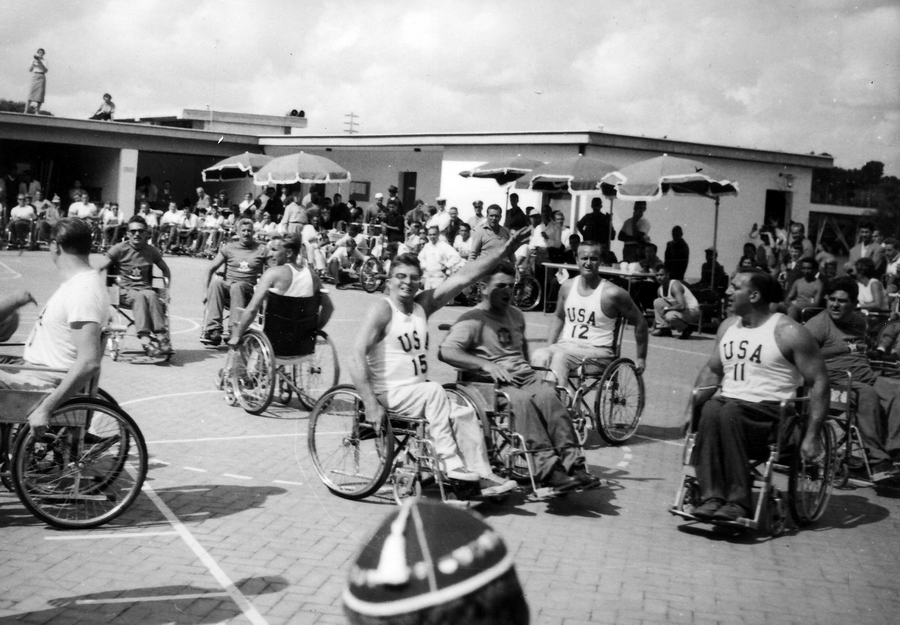
Rome 1960

Stein was part of the United States team that travelled to Rome, Italy, to take part in the 1960 Summer Paralympics, the first ever Paralympic Games. He competed in three individual athletics events and was also a part of the US wheelchair basketball squad. Stein won gold medals in his three athletic events club throw C, open pentathlon and shot put C. His wheelchair basketball team won a gold medal.

Stein also competed at the Tokyo Paralympics in 1964; he won six gold medals. In addition to defending the pentathlon, shot put and club throw titles he won in Rome, Stein set world records upon winning the javelin, with a throw of 26.70 metres (87.60 ft), and the discus, with a distance of 36.98 metres (121.3 ft). He also took gold in the wheelchair dash below T10 event.

He was inducted into the Wheelchair Sports USA Hall of Fame in 1970 and the National Wheelchair Basketball Hall of Fame in 1982.

== Personal life ==
He was married to Janet (White) Stein from September 5, 1959, until his death, and had three children.
