= West Germany at the 1964 Summer Paralympics =

- Flag of Germany
- IPC code: FRG
- NPC: National Paralympic Committee Germany
- Website: www.dbs-npc.de (in German)

in Tokyo
- Medals Ranked 9th: Gold 5 Silver 2 Bronze 5 Total 12

Summer Paralympics appearances (overview)
- 1960; 1964; 1968; 1972; 1976; 1980; 1984; 1988; 1992; 1996; 2000; 2004; 2008; 2012; 2016; 2020; 2024

Other related appearances
- East Germany (1984)

West Germany sent a delegation to compete at the 1964 Summer Paralympics in Tokyo, Japan. Its athletes finished ninth in the gold and overall medal count.

== See also ==
- 1964 Summer Paralympics medal table
- Germany at the 1964 Summer Olympics
