= Renzo Rogo =

Italian Paralympic swimmer

Sport
- Country: Italy
- Sport: Para Swimming; Wheelchair fencing
Medal record
Event	1st	2nd	3rd
Paralympic Games	5	0	2

Renzo Rogo was an Italian paralympic swimmer and wheelchair fencer who won seven medals at the Summer Paralympics.

== See also ==
- Italian multiple medallists at the Summer Paralympics
