= Dick Thompson (athlete) =

British Paralympic athlete

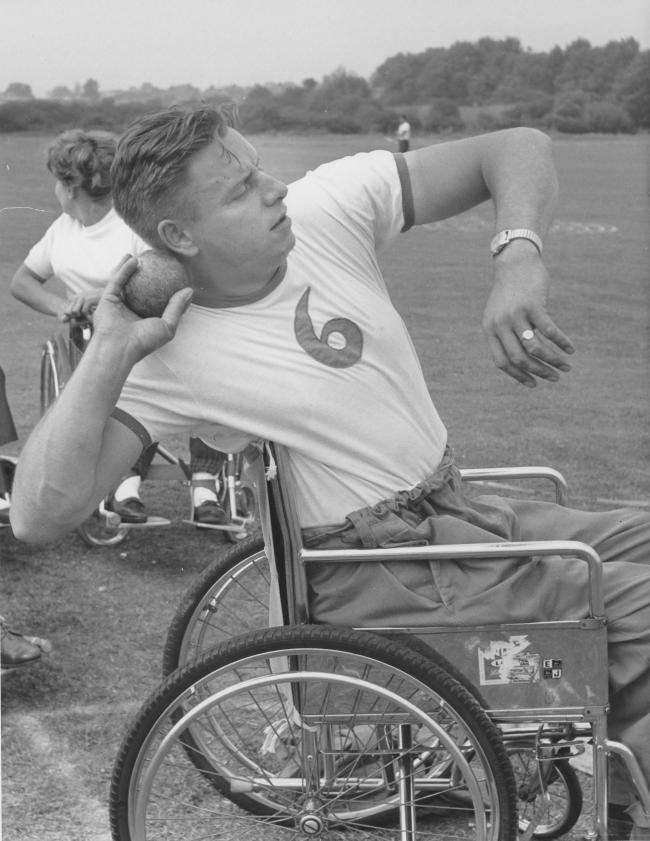
- Dick Thompson competing

Personal information
- Full name: Dick Thompson
- Born: December , 1930 Tynemouth, England
- Died: 1993 (aged 62–63) St Oswald's Hospice, Newcastle upon Tyne, England

Sport
- Country: Great Britain
- Sport: Javelin, club throw, shot put, wheelchair basketball, fencing
Medal record
Paralympic Games
Athletics
Gold medal – first place	Rome 1960	Men's Club Throw A
Gold medal – first place	Rome 1960	Men's Javelin A
Gold medal – first place	Rome 1960	Men's Javelin B
Gold medal – first place	Rome 1960	Men's Precision Javelin A
Gold medal – first place	Tokyo 1964	Men's Club Throw A
Gold medal – first place	Tokyo 1964	Men's Javelin A
Silver medal – second place	Tokyo 1964	Men's Shot Put A
Bronze medal – third place	Rome 1960	Men's Shot Put A
Bronze medal – third place	Tokyo 1964	Men's Wheelchair Dash Above T10
Bronze medal – third place	Tokyo 1964	Men's pentathlon 1
Bronze medal – third place	Tel Aviv 1968	Men's 100 m A
Bronze medal – third place	Tel Aviv 1968	Men's Javelin A
Wheelchair Basketball
Silver medal – second place	Rome 1960	Men's Tournament Class A
Silver medal – second place	Tokyo 1964	Men's Tournament A Complete
Bronze medal – third place	Rome 1960	Men's Tournament Class B

Dick Thompson (December 1930 – 1993) was a British Paralympic athlete who won six gold medals competing in track and field events. Thompson was most successful at the 1960 Summer Paralympics, winning three golds in the javelin events, a gold in the club throw, a bronze in the shot put, and two medals with the men's wheelchair basketball team.

Thompson married fellow Paralympian Diane Gubbin. He died in 1993, aged 62, at St Oswald's Hospice in Newcastle.
