= Margaret Harriman =

South African Paralympic athlete (1928-2003)

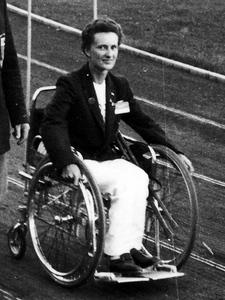
- Close-up of Harriman at Rome 1960

Personal information
- Nationality: Rhodesia; South Africa
- Born: Margaret Webb; 1928 Great Britain
- Died: 20 September 2003 (aged 74–75) Maine, USA
Medal record
Paralympic Games
Representing Rhodesia
Archery
| Gold medal – first place | 1960 Rome | Women's Windsor Round Open |
| Gold medal – first place | 1960 Rome | Women's FITA Round Open |
| Gold medal – first place | 1964 Tokyo | Women's Albion Round Open |
| Gold medal – first place | 1964 Tokyo | Women's FITA Round Open |
Dartchery
| Gold medal – first place | 1964 Tokyo | Mixed Pairs Open |
Swimming
| Silver medal – second place | 1960 Rome | Women's 50 m Crawl Incomplete class 4 |
| Bronze medal – third place | 1960 Rome | Women's 50 m Backstroke Incomplete class 4 |
| Bronze medal – third place | 1960 Rome | Women's 50 m Breaststroke Incomplete class 4 |
Representing South Africa
Archery
| Gold medal – first place | 1968 Tel Aviv | Women's Albion Round Open |
| Gold medal – first place | 1968 Tel Aviv | Women's FITA Round Open |
| Gold medal – first place | 1972 Heidelberg | Women's FITA Round Open |
Dartchery
| Bronze medal – third place | 1976 Toronto | Women's Pairs Open |
Lawn Bowls
| Gold medal – first place | 1972 Heidelberg | Women's singles |
| Silver medal – second place | 1972 Heidelberg | Women's pairs |
| Gold medal – first place | 1976 Toronto | Women's singles Wh |
| Gold medal – first place | 1976 Toronto | Women's pairs Wh |
| Bronze medal – third place | 1996 Atlanta | Women's singles LB2 |

Margaret Harriman (1928 - 20 September 2003) was a Paralympic athlete from South Africa. She was born in Great Britain.

She was the only lady to compete in the netball tournament of the second Stoke Mandeville Games in 1949 under her maiden name of Margaret Webb. From 1960 to 1976 she competed in the Summer Paralympics in many sports, including archery, athletics, dartchery, lawn bowls and swimming. She represented Rhodesia in her first two Paralympics and then South Africa since 1968, winning eleven gold medals.

Between 1960 and 1968 she won an impressive eight gold medals in archery.

In 1976 she became ineligible to compete after South Africa was banned from the games because of its policy on apartheid.

She made a long-awaited return to the competition at the 1996 Summer Paralympics in Lawn Bowls after the fall of apartheid which led to the lifting of the ban on South African competitors. In this edition she won her 17th and last medal, a bronze.

She died from a sudden illness while on holiday in Maine on September 20, 2003.
