= Japan at the 1964 Summer Paralympics =

- IPC code: JPN
- NPC: Japan Paralympic Committee
- Website: www.jsad.or.jp (in Japanese)

in Tokyo
- Competitors: 16 in 6 sports
- Medals Ranked 13th: Gold 1 Silver 5 Bronze 4 Total 10

Summer Paralympics appearances (overview)
- 1964; 1968; 1972; 1976; 1980; 1984; 1988; 1992; 1996; 2000; 2004; 2008; 2012; 2016; 2020; 2024

Japan was the host country of the 1964 Summer Paralympics in Tokyo, which also marked its first participation in the Paralympic Games. It was the only Asian country to take part in the Games.

Despite being the host nation, Japan fielded only sixteen representatives (fourteen men and two women), competing in archery, athletics, dartchery, swimming, table tennis, and wheelchair fencing. In the men's doubles (C category) in table tennis, Yasunori Igari and Fujio Watanabe won Japan's first Paralympic gold medal, and its only gold medal of the 1964 Games. Japanese competitors also won two silver medals in archery, a bronze in dartchery, a silver and a bronze in swimming, a silver and two bronze in table tennis, and a silver in wheelchair fencing.
