= 1964 Summer Paralympics =

Multi-parasport event in Tokyo, Japan

II Paralympic Games
- Location: Tokyo, Japan
- Nations: 21
- Athletes: 375
- Events: 144 in 9 sports
- Opening: 3 November 1964
- Closing: 12 November 1964
- Opened by: Crown Prince Akihito
- Stadium: Oda Field

The 1964 Summer Paralympics (Japanese: 1964年夏季パラリンピック, Hepburn: 1964-Nen Kaki Pararinpikku), originally known as the 13th International Stoke Mandeville Games, were the second Paralympic Games to be held. They were held in Tokyo, Japan, and were the last Summer Paralympics to take place in the same city as the Summer Olympics until the 1988 Summer Paralympics. The Summer Paralympics, so far the only Paralympics held in Tokyo to take place with Spectators, as the 2020 Summer Paralympics in Tokyo held without spectators due to the COVID-19 pandemic.

The 1964 Games, although still formally an edition of the International Stoke Mandeville Games, were the first to use the term "Paralympic" in association with the event; the term "Paralympic Games" was approved by the International Olympic Committee (IOC) first in 1984, while the International Paralympic Committee (IPC) was formed in 1989.

In contrast with the 1960 Games, many events had more than three participants, meaning that athletes were no longer guaranteed a medal upon completing their event.

Tokyo hosted the Summer Paralympic Games again in 2020.

== Sports ==
Nine sports were competed at the 1964 games. In athletics, a wheelchair racing event in the form of a 60 m dash was added; previously the athletics program had included only field events. Wheelchair racing has since become one of the most prominent Paralympic events.

- Archery
- Athletics
- Dartchery
- Snooker
- Swimming
- Table tennis
- Weightlifting
- Wheelchair basketball
- Wheelchair fencing

== Medal table ==
The physical medals themselves were created by a team of patients led by engineering instructor George Butler. The medals awarded displayed an engraving of a globe on one side paired with an image of the sport awarded on the other. Due to the fact that this was the first time the games were called the Paralympics, the words written on the medals said "Stoke Mandeville International Games – Tokyo 1964." The medals were also engraved and coated by George Butler himself.

Athletes from 17 of the 19 National Paralympic Committees (NPCs) won at least one medal. By default, the table is ordered by the number of gold medals the athletes from a nation have won. The number of silver medals is taken into consideration next and then the number of bronze medals. If nations are still tied, equal ranking is given and they are listed alphabetically by IPC country code.

With a few exceptions, each event contributed one medal of each type to the table (although for team events, multiple physical medals were actually awarded). Two bronze medals were awarded in the dartchery, snooker and table tennis events. Some swimming events did not award silver or bronze medals.

=== Inaccurate reports ===
At the start of the Paralympic Games there was no precision in reporting the results of the competitions. The Israeli athlete Michal Escapa was reported to be of Italian nationality and without a first name, as she is mentioned in the International Paralympic Committee of the Italian Paralympic Committee web sites) for the reports of the Swimming at the 1964 Summer Paralympics where she won two bronze medals, simply reported as Escapa and not as Michal Escapa. However, as can be seen from a 1968 Israeli newspaper reporting an interview with the athlete, she was the same athlete who had won medals in swimming and table tennis in Tokyo 1964.

‡ First-time Paralympic appearance

- To sort this table by nation, total medal count, or any other column, click on the icon next to the column title.

* Host nation (Japan)

| Rank | NPC | Gold | Silver | Bronze | Total |
|---|---|---|---|---|---|
| 1 | United States | 50 | 41 | 32 | 123 |
| 2 | Great Britain | 18 | 23 | 20 | 61 |
| 3 | Italy | 14 | 15 | 14 | 43 |
| 4 | Australia | 12 | 11 | 7 | 30 |
| 5 | Rhodesia | 10 | 5 | 2 | 17 |
| 6 | South Africa | 8 | 8 | 3 | 19 |
| 7 | Israel | 7 | 3 | 13 | 23 |
| 8 | Argentina | 6 | 15 | 16 | 37 |
| 9 | West Germany | 5 | 2 | 5 | 12 |
| 10 | Netherlands | 4 | 6 | 4 | 14 |
| 11 | France | 4 | 2 | 5 | 11 |
| 12 | Austria | 4 | 1 | 7 | 12 |
| 13 | Japan* | 1 | 5 | 4 | 10 |
| 14 | Belgium | 1 | 0 | 2 | 3 |
| 15 | Switzerland | 0 | 1 | 0 | 1 |
| 16 | Malta | 0 | 0 | 2 | 2 |
| 17 | Sweden | 0 | 0 | 1 | 1 |
| Totals (17 entries) | | 144 | 138 | 137 | 419 |

Athletes with outstanding performances included Margaret Harriman of Rhodesia who won two gold medals in archery, and Serge Bec of France who won two individuals gold medals, one team gold medal and one team silver medal. Dick Thompson of the United Kingdom won two individual golds, one silver and one bronze in athletics. The United States' Ron Stein won six golds and South Africa's Daniel Erasmus won two golds and two silvers in athletics.

== Participating delegations ==
Nineteen delegations participated in the Tokyo Paralympics.

The 1964 Games marked Austria, Fiji, Japan and South Africa's Paralympic Games début. South Africa had just been banned from taking part in the 1964 Summer Olympic Games, due to its policy of apartheid. It was not, however, banned from the Paralympics until 1980 Summer Paralympics, as Japan (in a host country position) did not oppose its participation. A letter from archery medalist Irene Preslipski published in the Times Leader on December 1, 1964, also mentions delegations from Ceylon, Mexico and the Philippines marching in the opening ceremony. However, these countries only sent in officials.

- Argentina (25)
- Australia (17)
- Austria (7)
- Belgium (3)
- Fiji (1)
- France (13)
- Great Britain (44)
- Ireland (2)
- Israel (19)
- Italy (19)
- Japan (16)
- Malta (2)
- Netherlands (11)
- Rhodesia (6)
- South Africa (9)
- Sweden (1)
- Switzerland (1)
- United States (65)
- West Germany (1)

== Ceremonies ==
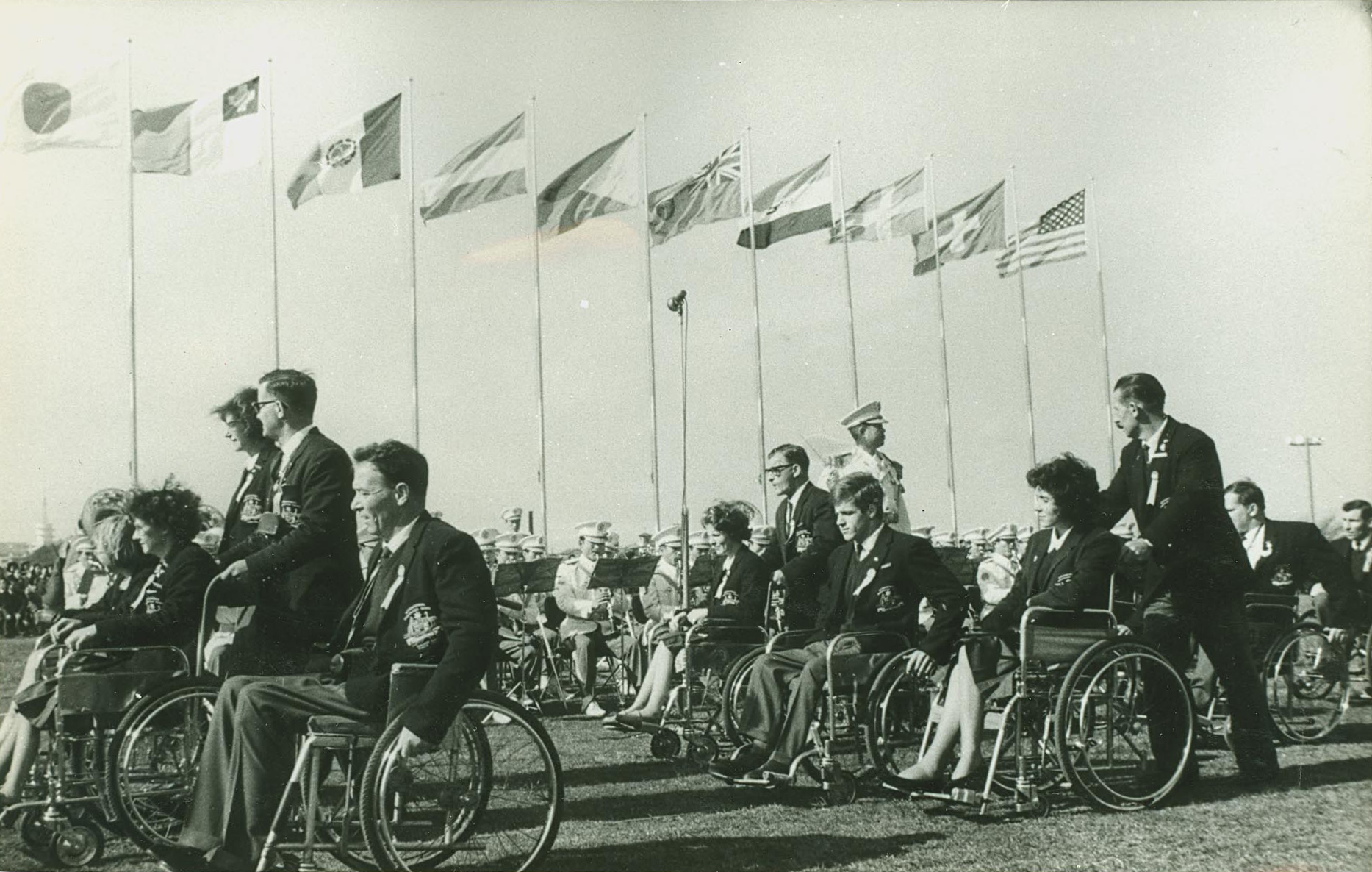
Members of the Australian Team march at the Opening Ceremony of the Tokyo 1964 Summer Paralympic Games

The Opening ceremony was organized in the Yoyogi Park, and the Closing Ceremony at Yoyogi National Gymnasium. About 5000 spectators were present at both of the ceremonies. Then Crown Prince Akihito and Crown Princess Michiko were present in both of them.

== Media Coverage & Reception ==
Earlier it was thought that the Games might not get much media coverage, due to the focus on the Olympic Games, but both radio and television media gave high coverage to the Games.

Most coverage in the media viewed the new Paralympics highly, and considered its new execution very well-done. The dedication to those with a variety of disabilities was thought to contribute to overall "international goodwill." This also made the Paralympic organization seem more "humane" since it was thought to be a good way of integrating disabled people into social and work environments.

British press was notably criticized by the founder of the games, Dr Ludwig Guttmann, for what he considered to be "poor coverage" of the games. He felt that in comparison to other countries, British press seemed to view the Paralympics not as a sports event, but as standard news.

== Organizing Committee ==
Yoshisuke Kasai was the chairman of the board of directors. The board had 3 vice-chairmen, namely T. Azuma, H. Dazai and I. Miki. The auditor of the organizing committee was M. Tozawa, and the secretary general was K. Ujiie.

| Preceded by Rome | Summer Paralympics; Tokyo; II Paralympic Summer Games (1964) | Succeeded by Tel Aviv |
