= Defunct Paralympic field events =

These defunct field events were once contested in previous Paralympic Games in which both men and women competed in various classes.

== Men's events ==
=== Football accuracy and distance ===
Football accuracy and distance were contested once in the 1976 Summer Paralympics.

Event	Year	Gold	Silver	Bronze
Football accuracy E1	1976	Jorn Nielsen; Denmark	Only one competitor	
Football distance E1	1976	Jorn Nielsen; Denmark	Only one competitor	

=== Pentathlon ===
==== Men ====
The men's event scheduled between 1960 and 2008.

Wheelchair athletes

Class	Year	Gold	Silver	Bronze
Open	1960	Ron Stein; United States	Dik Kruidenier; Netherlands	Russ Scott; Great Britain
Special class	1964	Ron Stein; United States	Tim Harris; United States	Jorge Diz; Argentina
Special class	1968	Ed Owen; United States	Denver Branum; United States	Jorge Diz; Argentina
1	1964	Richard Maduro; United States	Frank Vecera; United States	Dick Thompson; Great Britain
1B	1972	Patrick Reid; Jamaica	Julius Duval; United States	R. Zeyher; West Germany
2	1964	William Fairbanks; United States	Leslie Manson-Bishop; Rhodesia	Juan Sznitowski; Argentina
2	1972	Josef Jager; Austria	Schmicking; West Germany	Graeme Marett; New Zealand
3	1972	David Williamson; United States	Heinz Simon; West Germany	Terry Mason; Australia
4	1972	Eugene Reimer; Canada	W. Flach; West Germany	Reno Levis; United States
5	1972	Ray Clark; United States	Ed Owen; United States	Moll; West Germany
Complete	1968	Johann Schuhbauer; West Germany	Heinz Simon; West Germany	Leslie Manson-Bishop; Rhodesia
Incomplete	1968	H. Smith; United States	Clark; Great Britain	Tommy Taylor; Great Britain

=== Precision club throw ===
Precision club throw was contested between 1976 and 1984

Class	Year	Gold	Silver	Bronze
1A-1B	1976	Philip Wouters; Belgium	Samir; Egypt	Peter Marsh; Australia

=== Precision javelin ===
Precision javelin was contested at seven Games from 1960 to Athletics at the 1988 Summer Paralympics. It was absent in the 1964 Summer Paralympics.

Class	Year	Gold	Silver	Bronze
1C-5	1976	Walter Telsnig; Austria; Roy Nungester; United States		Honorio Romero; Argentina
A	1960	Dick Thompson; Great Britain	Frank Ponta; Australia	Jacob; West Germany
B	1960	Grimaldi; Italy	Gary Hooper; Australia	Castelli; Italy
C	1960	Felice Lenardon; Italy	Walter Telsnig; Austria	Engelbert Rangger; Austria
C	1976	Chihiro Hatta; Japan	Antti Nikkinen; Finland	J. Stam; Netherlands
Open	1968	Vincent Excell; Jamaica	Engelbert Rangger; Austria	Reno Levis; United States
Open	1972	Ernst Michel; Switzerland	Reno Levis; United States	Vic Renalson; Australia

=== Triple jump ===
This event was for men only and was contested from 1980 to 2012. They mainly competed by blind athletes or athletes with amputations.

==== Blind athletes ====
Class	Year	Gold	Silver	Bronze
B	1980	Andrzej Pawlik; Poland	N. Alvarez; Spain	Kalle Hautalahti; Finland
B1	1984	Soedjeman Dipowidjojo; Netherlands	José Manuel Rodríguez; Spain	Pauli Viertonen; Finland
B1	1988	Mineho Ozaki; Japan	Sergei Sevastianov; Soviet Union	José Manuel Rodríguez; Spain
B1	1992	José Manuel Rodríguez; Spain	Sergei Sevastianov; Unified Team	Robert Latham; Great Britain
B2	1984	Ante Pehar; Yugoslavia	Mineho Ozaki; Japan	Robert Latham; Great Britain
B2	1988	Vadim Kalmykov; Soviet Union	Yukio Mita; Japan	Ante Pehar; Yugoslavia
B2	1992	Juan Viedma; Spain	Aleksei Lashmanov; Unified Team	Huang Wentao; China
B3	1984	Garland Burress; United States	Paul Smith; United States	Pawel Janowicz; Poland
B3	1988	Ulrich Striegel; West Germany	Donko Angelov; Bulgaria	Shoichi Otsuka; Japan
B3	1992	Enrique Cepeda; Cuba	Donko Angelov; Bulgaria	Ulrich Striegel; Germany
F10	1996	José Manuel Rodríguez; Spain	Wang Sen; China	Victor Joukovski; Belarus
F11	1996	Juan Viedma; Spain	Huang Wentao; China	Igor Gorbenko; Ukraine
F11	2000	José Manuel Rodríguez; Spain	Li Duan; China	Viktar Zhukouski; Belarus
F11	2004	Li Duan; China	Zeynidin Bilalov; Azerbaijan	Sergey Sevostianov; Russia
F11	2008	Li Duan; China	Zeynidin Bilalov; Azerbaijan	Javier Porras; Spain
F11	2012	Denis Gulin; Russia	Li Duan; China	Ruslan Katyshev; Ukraine
F12	1996	Enrique Caballero; Cuba	Ihar Fartunau; Belarus	Ulrich Striegel; Germany
F12	2000	Huang Wentao; China	Ruslan Sivitski; Belarus	Igor Gorbenko; Ukraine
F12	2004	Duan Qifeng; China	Aliaksandr Kuzmichou; Belarus	Ivan Kytsenko; Ukraine
F12	2008	Osamah Alshanqiti; Saudi Arabia	Ivan Kytsenko; Ukraine	Vladimir Zayets; Azerbaijan
F12	2012	Oleg Panyutin; Azerbaijan	Vladimir Zayets; Azerbaijan	Dong Hewei; China

==== Amputee athletes ====
Class	Year	Gold	Silver	Bronze
A	1980	Soedjeman Dipowidjojo; Netherlands	Ryszard Kozuch; Poland	Markku Onnela; Finland
A5	1984	Jerzy Szlezak; Poland	Stephen Muir; Australia	No bronze medalist
A6	1984	Brett Holcombe; Australia	Odd Lovseth; Norway	Michael Morley; Australia
A6/A8-9/L6	1988	Rodney Nugent; Australia	Yang Shaomin; China	Qin Zhongxing; China
J3-4	1992	Yang Shao; China	Qiu Lin; China	Ruben Alvarez; Spain
F45-46	1996	Zhao Xueen; China	Florian Bohl; Germany	Ruben Alvarez; Spain
F46	2000	Zhang Hong Wei; China	Anton Skachkov; Ukraine	Ruben Alvarez; Spain
F46	2004	Anton Skachkov; Ukraine	Mai Wen Jie; China	Zhang Hong Wei; China
F46	2012	Liu Fuliang; China	Arnaud Assoumani; France	Aliaksandr Subota; Belarus

== Women's events ==
=== Pentathlon ===
The women's competition scheduled between 1968 and 2000

Wheelchair athletes

Class	Year	Gold	Silver	Bronze
2	1972	Ruth Lamsbach; West Germany	Fetter; United States	Sharon Myers; United States
3	1972	Eve Rimmer; New Zealand	Rosalie Hixson; United States	Binns; Canada
4	1972	Marga Floer; West Germany	Ora Goldstein; Israel	Carol Bryant; Great Britain
5	1972	Marion O'Brien; Great Britain	Only one competitor	
Complete	1968	Valerie Forder; Great Britain	Elena Monaco; Italy	Cornett; United States
Incomplete	1968	Margaret Gibbs; Great Britain	Marga Floer; West Germany	Carol Bryant; Great Britain
Special class	1968	Zipora Rubin-Rosenbaum; Israel	Silvia Cochetti; Argentina	Daphne Hilton; Australia

=== Precision javelin throw ===
Class	Year	Gold	Silver	Bronze
Open	1968	Baracatt; Jamaica	Silvana Martino; Italy	Rosalie Hixson; United States
Open	1972	Megumi Kawakami; Japan	Rosalie Hixson; United States	Hermina Kraft; Austria

== See also ==
- Defunct Paralympic track events
