= Swimming at the 1968 Summer Paralympics =

Swimming at the III Paralympic Games
- Paralympic Swimming

Swimming at the 1968 Summer Paralympics consisted of 68 events, 34 for men and 34 for women.

== Medal summary ==
=== Medal table ===
Rank	Nation	Gold	Silver	Bronze	Total
1	Great Britain (GBR)	13	7	8	28
2	United States (USA)	12	10	8	30
3	Netherlands (NED)	9	2	4	15
4	Rhodesia (RHO)	6	6	4	16
5	France (FRA)	6	4	4	14
6	West Germany (FRG)	5	4	6	15
7	Australia (AUS)	4	5	1	10
8	Norway (NOR)	3	1	1	5
9	Italy (ITA)	3	1	0	4
10	Israel (ISR)	2	8	5	15
11	Canada (CAN)	1	2	3	6
12	South Africa (RSA)	1	2	2	5
13	Argentina (ARG)	1	1	2	4
14	Jamaica (JAM)	1	1	0	2
15	Japan (JPN)	1	0	1	2
16	Austria (AUT)	0	3	6	9
17	Spain (ESP)	0	3	1	4
18	Sweden (SWE)	0	2	4	6
19	Switzerland (SUI)	0	1	2	3
20	Ireland (IRL)	0	1	1	2
21	Belgium (BEL)	0	1	0	1
21	New Zealand (NZL)	0	1	0	1
Totals (22 entries)		68	66	63	197

=== Participating nations ===
- Argentina (10)
- Australia (14)
- Austria (17)
- Belgium (4)
- Canada (15)
- Denmark (3)
- France (13)
- Great Britain (29)
- India (3)
- Ireland (3)
- Israel (19)
- Italy (12)
- Jamaica (3)
- Japan (6)
- Netherlands (12)
- New Zealand (6)
- Norway (10)
- Rhodesia (11)
- South Africa (3)
- Spain (4)
- Sweden (5)
- Switzerland (9)
- United States (33)
- West Germany (20)

=== Men's events ===
Event	Gold	Silver	Bronze
25 m freestyle class 1 complete	Sparsa; France	Crase; United States	Allan West; Great Britain
25 m freestyle class 1 incomplete	Daniel Jeannin; France	Manfred Emmel; West Germany	David Holland; Rhodesia
25 m freestyle class 2 complete	Helvio Aresca; Argentina	David Ellis; Great Britain	Vincent; United States
25 m freestyle class 2 incomplete	John Britton; Great Britain	Nel; South Africa	Claude Sugny; France
50 m freestyle class 3 complete	Leonard Chrysler; United States	W. Thornton; Great Britain	Safer; Austria
50 m freestyle class 3 incomplete	Harald Gunnerup; Norway	Johann Igel; Austria	Gustav Schuster; Canada
50 m freestyle class 4 complete	Foust; United States	Lewis; South Africa	Arimura; Japan
50 m freestyle class 4 incomplete	Koyachi; Japan	Kim Pollock; United States	Avraham Keftelovitch; Israel
50 m freestyle class 5 (cauda equina)	Roberto Marson; Italy	Carlos Carranza; Argentina	Soderberg; Sweden
50 m freestyle special class	Piet Makkes; Netherlands	Cestier; France	John van der Starre; Netherlands
100 m freestyle open	Branum; United States	John Watts; Great Britain	Eduard de Anta; Switzerland
25 m backstroke class 1 complete	Sparsa; France	Allan West; Great Britain	Dunn; United States
25 m backstroke class 1 incomplete	Daniel Jeannin; France	Manfred Emmel; West Germany	Glynn Griffiths; Rhodesia
25 m backstroke class 2 complete	David Ellis; Great Britain	Vincent; United States	Frank Ponta; Australia
25 m backstroke class 2 incomplete	Nel; South Africa	Claude Sugny; France	John Britton; Great Britain
50 m backstroke class 3 complete	Leonard Chrysler; United States	Eskild Hansen; Norway	W. Thornton; Great Britain
50 m backstroke class 3 incomplete	Paul Jacobsen; Norway	Peter Goldhawk; Rhodesia	Fiorello; United States
50 m backstroke class 4 complete	Leslie Manson-Bishop; Rhodesia	B. Dickinson; Great Britain	Harald Gerhard; West Germany
50 m backstroke class 4 incomplete	Moshe Levy; Israel	Andrew James Scott; Rhodesia	Gerry Kinsella; Great Britain
50 m backstroke class 5 (cauda equina)	Roberto Marson; Italy	Bernard Boulens; Switzerland	Olfson; Sweden
50 m backstroke special class	Piet Makkes; Netherlands	Branum; United States	Cestier; France
25 m breaststroke class 1 complete	Crase; United States	Sparsa; France	Walter Sailer; Austria
25 m breaststroke class 1 incomplete	Manfred Emmel; West Germany	Glynn Griffiths; Rhodesia	Daniel Jeannin; France
25 m breaststroke class 2 complete	David Ellis; Great Britain	Francesco Deiana; Italy	Vincent; United States
25 m breaststroke class 2 incomplete	Walter Hertle; West Germany	John Britton; Great Britain	Nel; South Africa
50 m breaststroke class 3 complete	W. Thornton; Great Britain	Jeff Simmonds; Australia	Willi Brinkmann; West Germany
50 m breaststroke class 3 incomplete	Harald Gunnerup; Norway	Don Watts; Australia	Johann Igel; Austria
50 m breaststroke class 4 complete	Leslie Manson-Bishop; Rhodesia	Harald Gerhard; West Germany	Lewis; South Africa
50 m breaststroke class 4 incomplete	Andrew James Scott; Rhodesia	Jacob Ben-Arie; Israel	M. Eden; Sweden
50 m breaststroke class 5 (cauda equina)	Roberto Marson; Italy	Soderberg; Sweden	Carlos Carranza; Argentina
50 m breaststroke special class	Ed Owen; United States	Carol; Spain	Arieh Rubin; Israel
100 m breaststroke open	Ed Owen; United States	Arieh Rubin; Israel	Carol; Spain
3×25 m individual medley open	Sestier; France	Arieh Rubin; Israel	Branum; United States
3×50 m medley relay open	Netherlands (NED)	Israel (ISR); Arieh Beizam; Arieh Rubin; Moshe Levy	United States (USA)

=== Women's events ===
Event	Gold	Silver	Bronze
25 m freestyle class 1 complete	Evelyn Mulry Moore; United States	Gorman; United States	None
25 m freestyle class 1 incomplete	Sandra Coppard; Rhodesia	None	None
25 m freestyle class 2 complete	Lorraine Dodd; Australia	Cornett; United States	Ruth Lamsbach; West Germany
25 m freestyle class 2 incomplete	Hilda Mae Binns; Canada	Evelyn Mulry Moore; United States	Virginia Tomlinson; Rhodesia
50 m freestyle class 3 complete	Valerie Forder; Great Britain	Riu; Spain	Elke Lange; West Germany
50 m freestyle class 3 incomplete	Marga Floer; West Germany	Jacqueline Thompson; Rhodesia	Cardon; France
50 m freestyle class 4 complete	Ailes; United States	Eve M. Rimmer; New Zealand	None
50 m freestyle class 4 incomplete	Elizabeth Edmondson; Australia	Meikle; Jamaica	Wil Verschoor; Netherlands
50 m freestyle class 5 (cauda equina)	Jardine; France	Daphne Hilton; Australia	Bellamy; Great Britain
50 m freestyle special class	Ingrid van der Benden; Netherlands	Rachel Shalom; Israel	Silvia Cochetti; Argentina
100 m freestyle open	Elizabeth Edmondson; Australia	Jardine; France	M. Gibbs; Great Britain
25 m backstroke class 1 complete	Aria Noordam; Netherlands	Gorman; United States	Caroline Troxler-Kung; Switzerland
25 m backstroke class 1 incomplete	Davina Ingrams; Great Britain	White; Ireland	Rosaleen Gallagher; Ireland
25 m backstroke class 2 complete	Lorraine Dodd; Australia	Soulek; United States	S. Jones; Great Britain
25 m backstroke class 2 incomplete	Gwen Buck; Great Britain	Lamb; Australia	Margit Schweiger; West Germany
50 m backstroke class 3 complete	Valerie Forder; Great Britain	Ilse Driessler; Austria	Elke Lange; West Germany
50 m backstroke class 3 incomplete	Karen Hill; Great Britain	McPherson; Canada	Jacqueline Thompson; Rhodesia
50 m backstroke class 4 complete	Kaminski; United States	Miller; Canada	Fischer; Austria
50 m backstroke class 4 incomplete	Wil Verschoor; Netherlands	Elizabeth Edmondson; Australia	Birgith Reklev; Norway
50 m backstroke class 5 (cauda equina)	Bellamy; Great Britain	Avril Davis; Rhodesia	Linda Stratman; United States
50 m backstroke special class	Janneke Minholtz; Netherlands	Ingrid van der Benden; Netherlands	Mali Mezin; Israel
25 m breaststroke class 1 complete	Gorman; United States	Moore; United States	Mati Angel; Israel
25 m breaststroke class 1 incomplete	Sandra Coppard; Rhodesia	None	None
25 m breaststroke class 2 complete	Lorraine Dodd; Australia	Ruth Lamsbach; West Germany	Cornett; United States
25 m breaststroke class 2 incomplete	Margit Schweiger; West Germany	Virginia Tomlinson; Rhodesia	Jenneke van Driel; Netherlands
50 m breaststroke class 3 complete	Valerie Forder; Great Britain	Riu; Spain	Rosi Kuhnel; Austria
50 m breaststroke class 3 incomplete	Marga Floer; West Germany	Sonja Graveland; Netherlands	McPherson; Canada
50 m breaststroke class 4 complete	Ailes; United States	Heidemarie Fischer; Austria	Waltraud Vetschera; Austria
50 m breaststroke class 4 incomplete	Meikle; Jamaica	M. Tufuesson; Sweden	Ora Goldstein; Israel
50 m breaststroke class 5 (cauda equina)	Bellamy; Great Britain	Lampo; Belgium	None
50 m breaststroke special class	Ingrid van der Benden; Netherlands	Malka Halfon; Israel	Janneke Minholtz; Netherlands
100 m breaststroke open	Ora Goldstein; Israel	Carol Bryant; Great Britain	McPherson; Canada
3×25 m individual medley open	M. Gibbs; Great Britain	Mali Mezin; Israel	M. Tufuesson; Sweden
3×50 m medley relay open	Netherlands (NED); Janneke Minholtz (backstroke); Wil Verschoor (Breaststroke); Ingrid van der Benden (freestyle)	Israel (ISR); Ora Goldstein; Malka Halfon; Zipora Rosenbaum	Great Britain (GBR)
