= Archery at the 1968 Summer Paralympics =

Archery at the III Paralympic Games
- Paralympic Archery
- Competitors: 154 from 24 nations

Archery at the 1968 Summer Paralympics consisted of thirteen events, eight for men and five for women.

== Medal table ==
Rank	Nation	Gold	Silver	Bronze	Total
1	United States (USA)	3	3	5	11
2	Great Britain (GBR)	2	2	1	5
3	Australia (AUS)	2	2	0	4
4	France (FRA)	2	1	2	5
5	South Africa (RSA)	2	0	0	2
6	West Germany (FRG)	1	1	1	3
7	Netherlands (NED)	1	1	0	2
8	Sweden (SWE)	0	2	0	2
9	Ireland (IRL)	0	1	0	1
10	Switzerland (SUI)	0	0	2	2
11	Italy (ITA)	0	0	1	1
Totals (11 entries)		13	13	12	38

=== Participating nations ===
- Australia (8)
- Belgium (8)
- Canada (1)
- Denmark (1)
- France (12)
- Great Britain (15)
- India (4)
- Ireland (1)
- Israel (4)
- Italy (4)
- Jamaica (6)
- Japan (6)
- Malta (1)
- Netherlands (5)
- New Zealand (5)
- Norway (6)
- Rhodesia (3)
- South Africa (3)
- South Korea (3)
- Spain (3)
- Sweden (9)
- Switzerland (11)
- United States (21)
- West Germany (14)

== Medal summary ==
=== Men's events ===
Event	Gold	Silver	Bronze
Albion round open	Tony South; Australia	Popke Popkema; Netherlands	Klemens; United States
Albion round team open	United States (USA); Gene Geissinger; Thomas D. Kelderhouse; Klemens	Great Britain (GBR); Tony Potter; John Robertson; Dennis Slough	France (FRA); David; Camille Trouverie; Ventadour
Columbia round open	Alan Conn; Australia	Reno Levis; United States	Giuliano Koten; Italy
Columbia round team open	United States (USA); Classon; Reno Levis; O'Donnell	West Germany (FRG); Luft; P. Prothmann; Heinz Simon	Switzerland (SUI); Gilbert Gauthier; Rudolf Pluer; Andre Sironi
FITA round open	Popke Popkema; Netherlands	Tony South; Australia	Elbracht; West Germany
FITA round team open	West Germany (FRG); Elbracht; Gobel; Schaede	Great Britain (GBR); Tony Potter; John Robertson; Dennis Slough	United States (USA); Gene Geissinger; Thomas D. Kelderhouse; Klemens
St. Nicholas round cervical	Derek Nicholson; Great Britain	Allan McLucas; Australia	Stephen Bradshaw; Great Britain
St. Nicholas round paraplegic	Arballo; United States	Nadal; France	Guesnon; France

=== Women's events ===
Event	Gold	Silver	Bronze
Albion round open	Margaret Harriman; South Africa	Judy Webb; United States	Arlette Keller; Switzerland
Columbia round open	Mireille Marraschin; France	Soulek; United States	Cornett; United States
FITA round open	Margaret Harriman; South Africa	Rodaster; Sweden	Judy Webb; United States
St. Nicholas round cervical	Ruth Brooks; Great Britain	Rosaleen Gallagher; Ireland	None
St. Nicholas round paraplegic	Girard; France	Johansson; Sweden	Moore; United States
