= Athletics at the 1968 Summer Paralympics – Men's 100 metres wheelchair C =

Men's 100 m wheelchair C at the III Paralympic Games
- Paralympic Athletics
- Competitors: 26 from 15 nations

Medalists
1st place, gold medalist(s)		Gary Odorowski	United States
2nd place, silver medalist(s)		Denver Branum	United States
3rd place, bronze medalist(s)		Miyazawa	Japan

The Men's 100 m wheelchair race C was one of the events held in Athletics at the 1968 Summer Paralympics in Tel Aviv.

There were 26 competitors in the heat; 6 made it into the final.

The United States' Gary Odorowski achieved a time of 22.1 seconds, taking the gold medal.

== Results ==
=== Heats ===
Rank	Athlete	Time
1	Gary Odorowski (USA)	21.4
2	Denver Branum (USA)	22.9
3	Ed Owen (USA)	23.3
4	Taketoshi Miyazawa (JPN)	24.1
5	Josef Greil (AUT)	24.1
6	Arieh Bizem (ISR)	24.2
7	Galea (MLT)	24.2
8	Lynch (GBR)	24.2
9	Furukawa (JPN)	24.4
10	Takeo Matsunaga (JPN)	24.5
11	Vomas (FRA)	24.8
12	Shigeru Hino (JPN)	24.8
13	Bautista Rubio (ARG)	24.9
14	Kerkhoven (NED)	25.6
15	Taylor (GBR)	25.7
16	Eduard de Anta (SUI)	26.1
17	Negatu (ETH)	26.5
18	Bernard Imfeld (SUI)	26.6
19	Wilfred van Brauene (BEL)	26.9
20	Georges Carrel (SUI)	26.9
21	Starre (NED)	26.9
22	Tak (NED)	27.7
23	Galetzko (FRG)	28.1
24	Hermann Kollau (SUI)	28.8
25	Llorens (ESP)	31.2
26	Romero (ESP)	34.4

=== Final ===
Rank	Athlete	Time
1st place, gold medalist(s)	Gary Odorowski (USA)	22.1
2nd place, silver medalist(s)	Denver Branum (USA)	22.7
3rd place, bronze medalist(s)	Taketoshi Miyazawa (JPN)	23.5
4	Ed Owen (USA)	23.6
5	Lynch (GBR)	23.7
6	Josef Greil (AUT)	25.4
