= Athletics at the 1968 Summer Paralympics – Men's discus throw A =

Men's Discus Throw A at the III Paralympic Games
- Paralympic Athletics
- Competitors: 33 from 16 nations

Medalists
| 1st place, gold medalist(s) | | Vic Renalson | Australia |
| 2nd place, silver medalist(s) | | Daniel Erasmus | South Africa |
| 3rd place, bronze medalist(s) | | Antonio Arizzi | Italy |

The Men's Discus Throw A was one of the events held in Athletics at the 1968 Summer Paralympics in Tel Aviv.

There were 33 competitors in the heat; 6 made it into the final.

Australia's Vic Renalson achieved a throw of 22.34 metres, taking the gold medal and a setting a world record in the process.

== Results ==
=== Heats ===
| Rank | Athlete | Throw |
|---|---|---|
| 1 | Vic Renalson (AUS) | 21.90 |
| 2 | Daniel Erasmus (RSA) | 21.32 |
| 3 | Leo Close (NZL) | 19.31 |
| 4 | Antonio Arizzi (ITA) | 19.20 |
| 5 | Len Campbell (NZL) | 18.44 |
| 6 | Britton (GBR) | 18.07 |
| 7 | Josef Jager (AUT) | 17.96 |
| 8 | Goll (AUT) | 17.90 |
| 9 | C. Sandglass (USA) | 17.57 |
| 10 | Honorio Romero (ARG) | 17.34 |
| 11 | Graeme Marett (NZL) | 16.89 |
| 12 | Dale Moe (CAN) | 16.43 |
| 13 | Ben Reimer (CAN) | 15.95 |
| 14 | Long (JAM) | 15.88 |
| 15 | Engelbert Rangger (AUT) | 15.82 |
| 16 | Joe Arcese (USA) | 15.45 |
| 17 | Rossini (USA) | 15.34 |
| 18 | Sommer (FRG) | 15.30 |
| 19 | Fritz Krimmel (FRG) | 15.17 |
| 20 | Robert Hawkes (USA) | 14.99 |
| 21 | Gustaaf Dua (BEL) | 14.90 |
| 22 | Patterson (CAN) | 14.10 |
| 22 | Jeff Simmonds (AUS) | 13.93 |
| 24 | Helvio Aresca (ARG) | 13.58 |
| 25 | Klein (FRG) | 13.54 |
| 26 | Boileaux (BEL) | 12.85 |
| 27 | Dick Thompson (GBR) | 12.69 |
| 28 | Iguzi (JPN) | 12.69 |
| 29 | Finucci (BEL) | 12.32 |
| 30 | Winfried Brauner (AUT) | 11.96 |
| 31 | Juan Luis Costantini (ARG) | 11.45 |
| 32 | Bellon (ESP) | 8.20 |
| 33 | Sharav (ISR) | 7.22 |

=== Final ===
| Rank | Athlete | Throw |
|---|---|---|
| 1st place, gold medalist(s) | Vic Renalson (AUS) | 22.34 m (WR) |
| 2nd place, silver medalist(s) | Daniel Erasmus (RSA) | 21.32 |
| 3rd place, bronze medalist(s) | Antonio Arizzi (ITA) | 20.40 |
| 4 | Leo Close (NZL) | 19.31 |
| 5 | Len Campbell (NZL) | 18.83 |
| 6 | Josef Jager (AUT) | 17.99 |
