= Table tennis at the 1968 Summer Paralympics =

Table tennis at the III Paralympic Games
- Paralympic Table tennis

Table tennis at the 1968 Summer Paralympics consisted of fifteen events, eight for men and seven for women.

== Medal table ==
Rank	Nation	Gold	Silver	Bronze	Total
1	Great Britain (GBR)	3	4	3	10
2	Israel (ISR)	3	1	4	8
3	West Germany (FRG)	2	2	1	5
4	Netherlands (NED)	2	1	0	3
5	Austria (AUT)	2	0	2	4
6	Sweden (SWE)	1	1	0	2
7	United States (USA)	1	0	4	5
8	Mixed-NOCs (MIX)	1	0	0	1
9	Belgium (BEL)	0	2	2	4
10	Norway (NOR)	0	2	0	2
11	Ireland (IRL)	0	1	3	4
12	Australia (AUS)	0	1	0	1
13	Italy (ITA)	0	0	5	5
14	Switzerland (SUI)	0	0	2	2
15	Rhodesia (RHO)	0	0	1	1
15	South Africa (RSA)	0	0	1	1
Totals (16 entries)		15	15	28	58

== Medal summary ==
=== Men's events ===
Event	Gold	Silver	Bronze
Singles A1	Dennis Post; Netherlands	Jan Erik Stenberg; Norway	Rainer Küschall; Switzerland
Singles A1	Dennis Post; Netherlands	Jan Erik Stenberg; Norway	Bernard McNichol; United States
Singles A2	Manfred Emmel; West Germany	Nilsson; Sweden	Walter Sailer; Austria
Singles A2	Manfred Emmel; West Germany	Nilsson; Sweden	Joseph Sharav; Israel
Singles B	Paul Lyall; Great Britain	Heinz Simon; West Germany	George Monaghan; Great Britain
Singles B	Paul Lyall; Great Britain	Heinz Simon; West Germany	Giovanni Ferraris; Italy
Singles C	Baruch Hagai; Israel	Richard de Zutter; Belgium	Jimmy Gibson; Ireland
Singles C	Baruch Hagai; Israel	Richard de Zutter; Belgium	Giovanni Berghella; Italy
Doubles A1	United States (USA); Robert Dunn; Bernard McNichol	Netherlands (NED); Aria Noordam; Dennis Post	United States (USA); Crase; Donaldson
Doubles A2	Great Britain (GBR); S. Bradshaw; Taylor	West Germany (FRG); Manfred Emmel; Gert Tullius	Switzerland (SUI); Rainer Küschall; Andreas Senn
Doubles A2	Great Britain (GBR); S. Bradshaw; Taylor	West Germany (FRG); Manfred Emmel; Gert Tullius	Israel (ISR); Gabriel; Joseph Sharav
Doubles B	West Germany (FRG); Fritz Krimmel; Heinz Simon	Great Britain (GBR); Paul Lyall; George Monaghan	Italy (ITA); Giovanni Ferraris; Federico Zarilli
Doubles B	West Germany (FRG); Fritz Krimmel; Heinz Simon	Great Britain (GBR); Paul Lyall; George Monaghan	Israel (ISR); Mickey Abeles; Moshe Gamishida
Doubles C	Israel (ISR); Baruch Hagai; Arieh Rubin	Belgium (BEL); Stevens; Richard de Zutter	Italy (ITA); Giovanni Berghella; Aroldo Ruschioni
Doubles C	Israel (ISR); Baruch Hagai; Arieh Rubin	Belgium (BEL); Stevens; Richard de Zutter	West Germany (FRG); Franz Brozozowski; Erich Schropp

=== Women's events ===
Event	Gold	Silver	Bronze
Singles A1	Aria Noordam; Netherlands	White; Ireland	Moore; United States
Singles A1	Aria Noordam; Netherlands	White; Ireland	Sandra Coppard; Rhodesia
Singles A2	Mati Angel; Israel	Tora Lysoe; Norway	Hattingh; South Africa
Singles A2	Mati Angel; Israel	Tora Lysoe; Norway	Rosaleen Gallagher; Ireland
Singles B	Rosa Kuhnel; Austria	Michal Escapa; Israel	Ingrid Voboril; Austria
Singles B	Rosa Kuhnel; Austria	Michal Escapa; Israel	Susan Masham; Great Britain
Singles C	Lindstrom; Sweden	Carol Bryant; Great Britain	Lampo; Belgium
Singles C	Lindstrom; Sweden	Carol Bryant; Great Britain	Batia Mishani; Israel
Doubles A2	Israel (ISR); Mati Angel; Tora Lysoe; Norway	Great Britain (GBR); Ruth Brooks; Levers	United States (USA); Gorman; Moore
Doubles A2	Israel (ISR); Mati Angel; Tora Lysoe; Norway	Great Britain (GBR); Ruth Brooks; Levers	Ireland (IRL); Rosaleen Gallagher; White
Doubles B	Austria (AUT); Rosa Kuhnel; Ingrid Voboril	Great Britain (GBR); Gwen Buck; Susan Masham	Great Britain (GBR); Finnegan; J. Swann
Doubles B	Austria (AUT); Rosa Kuhnel; Ingrid Voboril	Great Britain (GBR); Gwen Buck; Susan Masham	Italy (ITA); Elena Monaco; Gabriella Monaco
Doubles C	Great Britain (GBR); Barnard; Carol Bryant	Australia (AUS); Marian O'Brien; Elaine Schreiber	Belgium (BEL); Bruyndonck; Lampo
Doubles C	Great Britain (GBR); Barnard; Carol Bryant	Australia (AUS); Marian O'Brien; Elaine Schreiber	Italy (ITA); Rosaria La Corte; Irene Monaco
