= Athletics at the 1968 Summer Paralympics – Men's 100 metres wheelchair A =

Men's 100 m wheelchair A at the III Paralympic Games
- Paralympic Athletics
- Competitors: 17 from 8 nations

Medalists
1st place, gold medalist(s)		Gary Hooper	Australia
2nd place, silver medalist(s)		Bruno Moretti	Australia
3rd place, bronze medalist(s)		Dick Thompson	Great Britain

The Men's 100 metres wheelchair race A was one of the events held in Athletics at the 1968 Summer Paralympics in Tel Aviv.

There were 17 competitors in the heat; 6 made it into the final.

In the final, Australia's Gary Hooper achieved a time of 24.2 seconds, taking the gold medal.

== Results ==
=== Heats ===
Rank	Athlete	Time
1	Bruno Moretti (AUS)	24.0
2	Gary Hooper (AUS)	24.2
3	D. Pickering (GBR)	25.2
4	Dick Thompson (GBR)	25.2
5	Tuinier (NED)	26.0
6	Frank Ponta (AUS)	26.1
7	Alonzo Wilkins (USA)	26.2
8	Bill Mather-Brown (AUS)	26.4
9	Peter Gilomen (SUI)	27.3
10	Simmons (USA)	27.6
11	van Eyk (NED)	27.9
12	Ignaz Casutt (SUI)	28.5
13	Johann Igel (AUT)	28.7
14	Engelbert Rangger (AUT)	30.8
15	Gray (USA)	31.5
16	Keishi Kojima (JPN)	31.6
17	Pinnen (FRG)	36.9

=== Final ===
Rank	Athlete	Time
1st place, gold medalist(s)	Gary Hooper (AUS)	24.2
2nd place, silver medalist(s)	Bruno Moretti (AUS)	24.6
3rd place, bronze medalist(s)	Dick Thompson (GBR)	24.6
4	D. Pickering (GBR)	25.0
5	Tuinier (NED)	25.9
6	Frank Ponta (AUS)	26.6
