= Athletics at the 1968 Summer Paralympics – Men's 100 metres wheelchair B =

Event held in Athletics in Tel Aviv

Men's 100 m wheelchair B at the III Paralympic Games
- Paralympic Athletics
- Competitors: 17 from 7 nations

Medalists
| 1st place, gold medalist(s) | | Kevin Munro | Australia |
| 2nd place, silver medalist(s) | | David Williamson | United States |
| 3rd place, bronze medalist(s) | | Johann Schuhbauer | West Germany |

The Men's 100 m wheelchair race B was one of the events held in Athletics at the 1968 Summer Paralympics in Tel Aviv.

There were 17 competitors in the heat; 6 made it into the final.

Australia's Kevin Munro achieved a time of 21.8 seconds, taking the gold medal.

== Results ==
=== Heats ===
| Rank | Athlete | Time |
|---|---|---|
| 1 | Kevin Munro (AUS) | 21.6 |
| 2 | David Williamson (USA) | 22.8 |
| 3 | Browning (USA) | 23.8 |
| 4 | Gerry Kinsella (GBR) | 24.2 |
| 5 | Johann Schuhbauer (FRG) | 24.3 |
| 6 | John C. Clarke (GBR) | 24.3 |
| 7 | John Martin (AUS) | 24.5 |
| 8 | Ford (USA) | 24.7 |
| 9 | Danny Minchin (GBR) | 24.8 |
| 10 | Franz Bucher (SUI) | 25.0 |
| 11 | Kevin Coombs (AUS) | 25.9 |
| 12 | Fiorello (USA) | 25.9 |
| 13 | Erich Schropp (FRG) | 26.0 |
| 14 | Victor Bisquolm (SUI) | 26.5 |
| 15 | Walter Telsnig (AUT) | 28.6 |
| 16 | Hamann (FRG) | 31.5 |
| | Germishuizen (RSA) | DNF |

=== Final ===
| Rank | Athlete | Time |
|---|---|---|
| 1st place, gold medalist(s) | Kevin Munro (AUS) | 21.8 |
| 2nd place, silver medalist(s) | David Williamson (USA) | 23.0 |
| 3rd place, bronze medalist(s) | Johann Schuhbauer (FRG) | 23.2 |
| 4 | Browning (USA) | 23.6 |
| 5 | Gerry Kinsella (GBR) | 23.8 |
| 6 | Clark (GBR) | 24.6 |
