= Weightlifting at the 1968 Summer Paralympics =

Weightlifting at the III Paralympic Games
- Paralympic Weightlifting
- Dates: 07 – 12 November 1968
- Competitors: 28 from 13 nations

Weightlifting at the 1968 Summer Paralympics consisted of four events for men held 07 – 12 November 1968.

== Participating nations ==
There were 28 male competitors representing 13 nations.

- Australia (2)
- Belgium (3)
- Canada (2)
- France (2)
- Great Britain (4)
- India (1)
- Jamaica (1)
- Japan (3)
- New Zealand (1)
- Norway (2)
- Sweden (1)
- Switzerland (1)
- United States (5)

== Medal summary ==
=== Medal table ===
There were 12 medal winners representing nine nations.

| Rank | Nation | Gold | Silver | Bronze | Total |
|---|---|---|---|---|---|
| 1 | France (FRA) | 1 | 1 | 0 | 2 |
| 1 | Great Britain (GBR) | 1 | 1 | 0 | 2 |
| 3 | Australia (AUS) | 1 | 0 | 0 | 1 |
| 3 | Norway (NOR) | 1 | 0 | 0 | 1 |
| 5 | Sweden (SWE) | 0 | 1 | 0 | 1 |
| 5 | Switzerland (SUI) | 0 | 1 | 0 | 1 |
| 7 | United States (USA) | 0 | 0 | 2 | 2 |
| 8 | Jamaica (JAM) | 0 | 0 | 1 | 1 |
| 8 | Japan (JPN) | 0 | 0 | 1 | 1 |
| Totals (9 entries) | | 4 | 4 | 4 | 12 |

=== Men's events ===
| Event | Gold | Silver | Bronze |
|---|---|---|---|
| Men's featherweight | Dumont; France | Benny Nilsson; Sweden | Nagumo; Japan |
| Men's lightweight | Vidar Johnsen; Norway | Ernst Michel; Switzerland | Hall; Jamaica |
| Men's middleweight | T. Palmer; Great Britain | Brifoulliere; France | Jensen; United States |
| Men's heavyweight | Vic Renalson; Australia | R. Rowe; Great Britain | Rossini; United States |
