= 1968 Summer Paralympics medal table =

1968 Summer Paralympics medals
- Location: Tel Aviv, Israel

Highlights
- Most gold medals: United States (33)
- Most total medals: United States (99)
- Medalling NPCs: 22

The 1968 Summer Paralympics was an international multi-sport event held in Tel Aviv, Israel, from November 4 to 13, 1968, in which athletes with physical disabilities competed against one another. The Paralympics are run in parallel with the Olympic Games; these Games were originally planned to be held alongside the 1968 Summer Olympics in Mexico City, but two years prior to the event the Mexican government pulled out due to technical difficulties. At the time, the event was known as the 17th International Stoke Mandeville Games. The Stoke Mandeville Games were a forerunner to the Paralympics first organized by Sir Ludwig Guttmann in 1948. This medal table ranks the competing National Paralympic Committees (NPCs) by the number of gold medals won by their athletes.

A total of 576 medals were awarded in 10 sports. Athletes from 22 of the 28 competing NPCs won at least one medal with the United States taking both the most gold, with 33, and most in total, with 99. Host nation Israel won 62 medals at the Games, 18 gold, 21 silver and 23 bronze. Zipora Rubin-Rosenbaum won gold medals in the club throw, javelin, shot put and pentathlon and a silver medal in the discus for the host nation. South Africa, who were banned from the Olympic Games because of the policy of apartheid, were invited to the Paralympics and won a total of 26 medals.

Italian athlete Roberto Marson, who had previously won two gold medals in athletics at the 1964 Summer Paralympics in Tokyo, was proclaimed the outstanding athlete of the Games. He won ten gold medals, three in athletics field events, three in swimming and four in wheelchair fencing. Ed Owen of the United States won medals in three different sports; four golds and a bronze in athletics, two golds in swimming and a silver in wheelchair basketball.

== Medal table ==
The ranking in this table is based on information provided by the International Paralympic Committee (IPC) and is consistent with IPC convention in its published medal tables. By default, the table is ordered by the number of gold medals the athletes from a nation have won (in this context, a "nation" is an entity represented by a National Paralympic Committee). The number of silver medals is taken into consideration next and then the number of bronze medals. If nations are still tied, equal ranking is given and they are listed alphabetically by IPC country code.

Two bronze medals were awarded in each dartchery, snooker, table tennis and lawn bowls event. Some swimming events did not award silver or bronze medals.

* Host nation (Israel)

Rank	Nation	Gold	Silver	Bronze	Total
1	United States	33	27	39	99
2	Great Britain	29	20	20	69
3	Israel*	18	21	23	62
4	Australia	15	16	7	38
5	France	13	10	9	32
6	West Germany	12	12	11	35
7	Italy	12	10	17	39
8	Netherlands	12	4	4	20
9	Argentina	10	10	10	30
10	South Africa	9	10	7	26
11	Rhodesia	6	7	7	20
12	Canada	6	6	7	19
13	Norway	5	3	1	9
14	Jamaica	3	1	1	5
15	Austria	2	7	10	19
16	Japan	2	2	8	12
17	Sweden	1	6	4	11
18	New Zealand	1	2	1	4
19	Ireland	0	4	5	9
20	Belgium	0	3	3	6
21	Spain	0	3	1	4
22	Switzerland	0	2	6	8
Totals (22 entries)		189	186	201	576

== See also ==
- 1968 Summer Olympics medal table
