= Athletics at the 1968 Summer Paralympics – Women's 60 metres wheelchair C =

Women's 60 metres wheelchair C at the III Paralympic Games
- Paralympic Athletics
- Competitors: 10 from 7 nations

Medalists
1st place, gold medalist(s)		Carol Bryant	Great Britain
2nd place, silver medalist(s)		Keyser	United States
3rd place, bronze medalist(s)		Daphne Hilton	Australia

The Women's 60 metres wheelchair C was a wheelchair sprinting event held in athletics at the 1968 Summer Paralympics in Tel Aviv.

Ten athletes competed, representing seven nations. Heats were held, to reduce the number of competitors to six for the final round. Carol Bryant, the only athlete to complete the race in less than 16 seconds, took the gold medal for Great Britain. American athlete Keyser (full name not recorded) finished in a comfortable second place, while the remaining competitors finished within 0.4 seconds of one another, about two seconds behind her. Israel's Zipora Rubin-Rosenbaum had finished third in the heats, but was edged out of a medal position in the final, as Daphne Hilton of Australia crossed the line 0.2 seconds ahead of her for bronze, and M. Gibbs of Great Britain finished less than one tenth of a second before her, for fourth place.

== Heats ==
The top six athletes qualified for the final. For reasons unrecorded in the IPC database, E. Cox of the United States took over a minute to complete the 60 m race – more than four times as long as any other competitor.

Rank	Athlete	Time	Result
1	Carol Bryant (GBR)	15.9	Q
2	Keyser (USA)	16.3	Q
3	Zipora Rubin-Rosenbaum (ISR)	18.0	Q
4	M. Gibbs (GBR)	18.3	Q
5	Daphne Hilton (AUS)	18.6	Q
6	Nakagawa (JPN)	18.9	Q
7	Halfon (ISR)	19.4	
8	S. Cochetti (ARG)	19.6	
9	Marga Floer (FRG)	22.5	
10	E. Cox (USA)	1:05.0	

== Final ==
Rank	Athlete	Result
1st place, gold medalist(s)	Carol Bryant (GBR)	15.9
2nd place, silver medalist(s)	Keyser (USA)	16.3
3rd place, bronze medalist(s)	Daphne Hilton (AUS)	18.1
4	M. Gibbs (GBR)	18.3
5	Zipora Rubin-Rosenbaum (ISR)	18.3
6	Nakagawa (JPN)	18.5
