= Lawn bowls at the 1968 Summer Paralympics =

Lawn bowls at the III Paralympic Games
- Paralympic Lawn bowls

Lawn bowls at the 1968 Summer Paralympics consisted of four events.

== Medal summary ==
Event	Gold	Silver	Bronze
Men's pairs	Great Britain (GBR); William Easton; George Monoghan	South Africa (RSA); Daniel Erasmus; Germishuizen	United States (USA); C. Sandglass; Vincent
Men's pairs	Great Britain (GBR); William Easton; George Monoghan	South Africa (RSA); Daniel Erasmus; Germishuizen	Italy (ITA); Gambatesa; Raimondo Longhi
Men's singles	Daniel Erasmus; South Africa	John Britton; Great Britain	Lionetti; United States
Men's singles	Daniel Erasmus; South Africa	John Britton; Great Britain	Walter Schmid; Canada
Women's pairs	Great Britain (GBR); Gwen Buck; Janet Laughton	United States (USA); Rosalie Hixson; Marilyn Warren Woods	France (FRA); Belasset; Sylviane Guesnon
Women's singles	Gwen Buck; Great Britain	Mariann Soulek; United States	Rosalie Hixson; United States
Women's singles	Gwen Buck; Great Britain	Mariann Soulek; United States	Belasset; France
