= Sweden at the 1968 Summer Paralympics =

- IPC code: SWE (SUE used at these Games)
- NPC: Swedish Parasports Federation

in Tel Aviv
- Medals Ranked 17th: Gold 1 Silver 6 Bronze 4 Total 11

Summer Paralympics appearances (overview)
- 1960; 1964; 1968; 1972; 1976; 1980; 1984; 1988; 1992; 1996; 2000; 2004; 2008; 2012; 2016; 2020; 2024

Sweden was one of twenty-eight nations that sent a delegation to the 1968 Summer Paralympics in Tel Aviv, Israel from November 4 to 13, 1968. The team finished seventeenth in the medal table and won eleven medals: one gold, six silver and four bronze. Thirty-two Swedish athletes took part in the Games; twenty-seven men and five women. (Note: Data is taken from the International Paralympic Committee website and is based on information contained/sourced in the original hardcopy final results publications. Some information from earlier Paralympic Games (i.e. 1960 – 1984) is incomplete and is missing first names of some athletes)

== Disability classifications ==
The Paralympics groups athletes' disabilities into one of five disability categories; amputation, the condition may be congenital or sustained through injury or illness; cerebral palsy; wheelchair athletes, there is often overlap between this and other categories; visual impairment, including blindness; Les autres, any physical disability that does not fall strictly under one of the other categories, for example dwarfism or multiple sclerosis. Each Paralympic sport then has its own classifications, dependent upon the specific physical demands of competition. Events are given a code, made of numbers and letters, describing the type of event and classification of the athletes competing.

== Medalists ==
Medal	Name	Sport	Event
Gold	Lindström	Table tennis	Women's singles C
Silver	Johansson	Archery	Women's St. Nicholas round paraplegic
Silver	Nilsson	Table tennis	Men's singles A2
Silver	Benny Nilsson	Weightlifting	Men's featherweight
Silver	Rodaster	Archery	Women's FITA round open
Silver	Söderberg	Swimming	Men's 50 m breaststroke class 5 (cauda equina)
Silver	M. Tufuesson	Swimming	Women's 50 m breaststroke class 4 incomplete
Bronze	M. Eden	Swimming	Men's 50 m breaststroke class 4 incomplete
Bronze	Olfson	Swimming	Men's 50 m backstroke class 5 (cauda equina)
Bronze	Söderberg	Swimming	Men's 50 m freestyle class 5 (cauda equina)
Bronze	M. Tufuesson	Swimming	Women's 3x25 m individual medley open

Medals by sport
Sport	Gold medal	Silver medal	Bronze medal	Total
Table tennis	1	1	0	2
Swimming	0	2	4	6
Archery	0	2	0	2
Weightlifting	0	1	0	1
Total	1	6	4	11

== Archery ==
Sweden sent nine athletes to compete in archery. Two medals were won by Swedish archers; Johansson won silver in the St. Nicholas round for paraplegic women and Rodaster won silver in the women's FITA round open.

== Dartchery ==
The only dartchery event at the Games was the mixed pairs event which had a knockout tournament format. Two Swedish pairs entered; Luks and Andersson lost in the first round to the Australians Roy Fowler and Kevin Bawden; Johansson and Hansson also lost in the first round to Belgian pair Schelfaut and Desal.

== Swimming ==
Swedish swimmers won two silver and four bronze medals in Tel Aviv. Two athletes won multiple medals; Soderberg won a silver in the men's 50 metres breaststroke class 5 cauda equina and a bronze in the 50 metres freestyle; Tufuesson won a bronze in the open 3×25 metres individual medley and a silver in the women's 50 metres backstroke class 4 incomplete. Further bronze medals were won by Eden in the men's 50 metres breaststroke class 4 incomplete and by Olfson in men's 50 metres backstroke class 5 cauda equina.

== Weightlifting ==
One man entered weightlifting events for Sweden, Benny Nilsson in the featherweight division. He lifted 120 kg to win the silver medal. Gold was won by Dumont of France whose lift of 125 kg was a new world record.

== Wheelchair basketball ==
Sweden entered a team into the men's wheelchair basketball. The competition featured a pool stage followed by a knockout competition. Sweden lost both their pool matches, 8–26 to Belgium and 15–35 to Canada, and did not advance to the quarterfinals.

== See also ==
- Sweden at the 1968 Summer Olympics
