= Miguel Carol =

Spanish swimmer

Personal information
- Nationality: Spain
- Born: Madrid, Spain

Sport
- Sport: Swimming
Medal record
Men's swimming
Representing Spain
Paralympic Games
Silver medal – second place	1968 Tel Aviv	50m breaststroke special class
Bronze medal – third place	1968 Tel Aviv	100m breaststroke open

Miguel Carol is an S3 swimmer from Spain. He competed at the 1968 Summer Paralympics, winning a silver in the 50m breaststroke and a bronze in the 100m breaststroke.
