= Moshe Cohen =

Israeli Paralympic swimmer

Personal information
- Native name: משה כהן
- Nationality: Israel

Sport
- Sport: Swimming
Medal record
Event / 1st / 2nd / 3rd; Paralympic Games / 1 / 1 / 0
Men's para swimming
Representing Israel
Paralympic Games
| Gold medal – first place | 1976 Toronto | 4X100m medley relay |
| Silver medal – second place | 1976 Toronto | 50m butterfly 5 |
Stoke Mandeville Games
| Gold medal – first place | 1974 Stoke Mandeville | 100m backstroke |
| Silver medal – second place | 1974 Stoke Mandeville | 25m butterfly |
| Silver medal – second place | 1974 Stoke Mandeville | 3X50m individual medley |

Moshe Cohen (Hebrew: משה כהן) is a former Israeli Paralympic swimmer.

== Biography ==
Cohen competed in the 1974 Stoke Mandeveille Games and won four medals.

In the 1976 Summer Paralympics he took part in six swimming tournaments. He won a gold medal alongside Uri Bergman, Moshe Levy and Arieh Rubin in the 4X100m medley relay. Individually, he won a silver medal swimming in the 50m butterfly tournament. He finished fifth in the 100m freestyle tournament, sixth in the 3X50m individual medley tournament and seventh in the 100m breaststroke tournament. Cohen also took part in the 100m backstroke tournament and did not qualify for the final.
