= Manfred Emmel =

German table tennis player (1945–2025)

Personal information
- Born: 8 October 1945 Seckbach, Frankfurt, Germany
- Died: 6 October 2025 (aged 79)

Sport
- Sport: Para table tennis
Medal record
Representing West Germany
Paralympic Games
Silver medal – second place	1976 Toronto	Discus throw 1C
Para swimming
Gold medal – first place	1968 Tel Aviv	25m breaststroke class 1
Gold medal – first place	1980 Arnhem	3x25m freestyle relay 1A-1C
Silver medal – second place	1968 Tel Aviv	25m freestyle class 1
Silver medal – second place	1968 Tel Aviv	25m backstroke class 1
Silver medal – second place	1976 Toronto	25m freestyle 1C
Silver medal – second place	1976 Toronto	25m breaststroke 1C
Silver medal – second place	1980 Arnhem	25m freestyle 1C
Para table tennis
Gold medal – first place	1968 Tel Aviv	Singles A2
Gold medal – first place	1976 Toronto	Singles 1C
Gold medal – first place	1980 Arnhem	Singles 1C
Gold medal – first place	1980 Arnhem	Teams 2
Gold medal – first place	1984 New York	Singles 1C
Gold medal – first place	1984 New York	Teams 1C
Gold medal – first place	1988 Seoul	Singles 1C
Silver medal – second place	1968 Tel Aviv	Doubles A2
European Championships
Gold medal – first place	1983 Ingolstadt	Teams 1C
Gold medal – first place	1985 Delden	Singles 1C
Gold medal – first place	1985 Delden	Teams 1C
Gold medal – first place	1987 Stoke Mandeville	Singles 1C
Gold medal – first place	1987 Stoke Mandeville	Teams 1C
Bronze medal – third place	1983 Ingolstadt	Singles 1C

Manfred Emmel (8 October 1945 – 6 October 2025) was a German para table tennis player who competed in international table tennis competitions. He was an eight-time Paralympic champion in swimming and table tennis. He was notably one of the most successful German para table tennis player in the 1970s and 1980s.

In 1967, Emmel founded the Wheelchair Sports Club (German: Rollstuhl-Sport-Club, RSC) in Frankfurt with Kurt Nicklas who was a physiotherapist for a trauma clinic in Berlin and Alfred Daßbach. Emmel was the chairman for the RSC from 1994 to 2015. The RSC is a sports club for wheelchair users who compete in wheelchair basketball, archery, wheelchair curling, handcycling, wheelchair rugby, wheelchair dancing and table tennis.

== Personal life ==
In 1963, Emmel was paralysed from a swimming accident in Schultheis pond in Offenbach District when he dived into the pond head first into gravel.

Emmel passed away days before his 80th birthday in 2025.
