= María Carmen Riu Pascual =

Spanish swimmer

Personal information
- Nationality: Spanish
- Born: 11 April 1951 (age 75) Barcelona

Sport
- Country: Spain
- Sport: Swimming (Class 3)
Medal record
Swimming
Representing Spain
Paralympic Games
| Silver medal – second place | 1968 Tel Aviv | 50m freestyle C3 |
| Silver medal – second place | 1968 Tel Aviv | 50m breaststroke C3 |

Maria Carmen Riu Pascual (born 11 April 1951 in Barcelona) is a retired Class 3 breaststroke and freestyle swimmer from Spain. She competed at the 1968 Summer Paralympics, winning a pair of silver medals.
