= Paul Lyall =

British para table tennis player (1944–2021)

Personal information
- Born: 1944 Writtle, Chelmsford, Great Britain
- Died: 24 December 2021 (aged 76–77) Ruislip, Middlesex

Sport
- Country: Great Britain
- Sport: Para table tennis
- Disability: Paraplegia
Medal record
Para table tennis
Representing Great Britain
Paralympic Games
Gold medal – first place	1964 Tokyo	Singles B
Gold medal – first place	1964 Tokyo	Doubles B
Gold medal – first place	1968 Tel Aviv	Singles B
Silver medal – second place	1968 Tel Avivi	Doubles B
Bronze medal – third place	1972 Heidelberg	Singles 4
Bronze medal – third place	1972 Heidelberg	Teams 4
Representing England
Commonwealth Games
Gold medal – first place	1966 Kingston	Singles 2
Gold medal – first place	1966 Kingston	Doubles 2

Paul Lyall (1944 – 24 December 2021) was a British para table tennis player who competed at three Paralympic Games winning a total of six medals including three gold medals. He was known as one of the British legends of the early years of the Paralympics.

== Personal life ==
Lyall was born in Writtle, Chelmsford in 1944 and he spent most of his childhood living with his mother and grandparents in East Anglia, he had a strong interest in gardening and nature at a young age while working at his grandparents' farm. He left school at fifteen years old and joined up to an apprenticeship to qualify as a plumber. In 1960, he was involved in a motorbike accident which left him paralysed and became a wheelchair user from then on. He was in Stoke Mandeville Hospital for a nine-month rehabilitation and was introduced to wheelchair table tennis and he was immediately interested in the sport, his sporting career developed quickly and an ex-county player was intrigued in Lyall and trained him up to take part in the 1964 Summer Paralympics in Tokyo where he won his first international medals by winning two gold medals in the men's singles and doubles.

Following his success from winning two medals at the 1964 Games, he went onto win more medals and won another two gold medals at the 1966 Commonwealth Games in Kingston, Jamaica with Phillip Lewis in the doubles event. Lyall competed at the 1968 Summer Paralympics and he won his fifth international gold medal and his second consecutive Paralympic medal in the singles, he won a silver medal in the doubles with George Monahan. His third and final Paralympic Games were the 1972 Summer Paralympics in Heidelberg where he won two bronze medals and he retired after the Games.
