= Joseph Sharav =

Israeli Paralympian (1934–2016)

Personal information
- Native name: יוסף שרב
- Born: 28 October 1934
- Died: 15 June 2016 (aged 81)

Sport
- Country: Israel
- Sport: Para shooting; Para table tennis; Para-athletics; Wheelchair basketball
Medal record
Event / 1st / 2nd / 3rd; Paralympic Games / 0 / 0 / 5
Representing Israel
Paralympic Games
Table tennis
Bronze medal – third place	1964 Tokyo	Singles A2
Bronze medal – third place	1968 Tel Aviv	Singles A2
Bronze medal – third place	1968 Tel Aviv	Doubles A2
Shooting
Bronze medal – third place	1976 Toronto	Mixed Rifle Shooting 1A-1C
Wheelchair basketball
Bronze medal – third place	1964 Tokyo	Men's tournament A
Stoke Mandeville Games
Table tennis
Bronze medal – third place	1956	Singles

Joseph Sharav (Hebrew: יוסף שרב; 28 October 1934 – 15 June 2016) was an Israeli paralympic competitor in four Summer Paralympic Games (1964, 1968, 1976 and 1980) and won five bronze medals in para table tennis (1964 and 1968), shooting (1976) and wheelchair basketball (1964).

Sharav was born in 1934 while his parents were on their journey from Afghanistan to Mandatory Palestine and was raised in Tel Aviv. During his service in the Israel Defense Forces in the 1950s, he was injured in a traffic collision. He suffered from partial paralysis of his upper body and one of his arms.

He was one of the first Israeli representatives to the Stoke Mandeville Games and won a bronze medal in table tennis in 1956. He later took part in four Summer Paralympics and competed in various sporting events:

Sharav was a member of Israel men's national wheelchair basketball team in the 1964 Summer Paralympics, winning a bronze medal in the Men's Tournament A.

In para table tennis, Sharav competed in four Summer Paralympics (1964, 1968, 1976 and 1980) and won three bronze medals for Men's Singles A2 (1964 and 1968) and for Men's Doubles A2 (1968) alongside Gabriel Gobi. At the 1976 Summer Paralympics he was ranked 25th in the Men's Singles A2 event and at the 1980 Summer Paralympics he reached the quarterfinals in the Men's Doubles 1C event.

In shooting, Sharav competed in two Summer Paralympics (1976 and 1980) and won one bronze medal, in the 1976 Mixed Rifle Shooting 1A-1C event. At the 1980 Summer Paralympics he took part in four shooting events, finishing three of the events in fourth place.

At the 1968 Summer Paralympics he took part in four events as a para athlete, achieving low ranks in all four: discus throw, shot put, javelin throw and club throw.

Sharav died in 2016 at the age of 81.
