= John Britton (swimmer) =

English-Kenyan paralympic athlete

Personal information
- Born: 1923 London, England
- Died: 5 June 2004 (aged 80–81)

Sport
- Country: United Kingdom; Kenya
- Sport: Lawn bowls Swimming
Medal record
Representing United Kingdom
Paralympic Games
Swimming
| Gold medal – first place | 1968 Tel Aviv | Men's 25 m freestyle class 2 incomplete |
| Bronze medal – third place | 1968 Tel Aviv | Men's 25 m backstroke class 2 incomplete |
| Silver medal – second place | 1968 Tel Aviv | Men's 25 m breaststroke class 2 incomplete |
Lawn bowls
| Silver medal – second place | 1968 Tel Aviv | Men's singles |
Representing Kenya
Swimming
| Gold medal – first place | 1972 Heidelberg | Men's 25 m freestyle 2 |

John Britton (1923 – 5 June 2004) was an English-Kenyan paralympic lawn bowl player and swimmer. He competed at the 1968 and 1972 Summer Paralympics.

== Life and career ==
Britton was born in London. He attended the University of London and the University of Uganda.

Britton represented Great Britain at the 1968 Summer Paralympics, competing in lawn bowling and swimming. He won four medals. He also represented Kenya at the 1972 Summer Paralympics, winning a gold medal in the men's 25 m freestyle 2 event in swimming.

Britton died in June 2004.
