= Mickey Abeles =

Israeli Paralympic competitor

Personal information
- Native name: מיקי אבלס
- National team: Israel
- Born: 1917
- Died: 2004 (aged 86–87)

Sport
- Country: Israel
- Sport: Para table tennis; Para swimming
Medal record
Event / 1st / 2nd / 3rd; Paralympic Games / 0 / 0 / 1
Representing Israel
Paralympic Games
Table tennis
| Bronze medal – third place | 1968 Tel Aviv | Men's Doubles B |

Mickey Abeles (Hebrew: מיקי אבלס; 1917-2004) was an Israeli Paralympic competitor in para table tennis and para swimming.

== Biography ==
Abeles contracted polio at age 29 and remained paralyzed in his lower limbs.

In the 1958 Stoke Mandeville Games Abeles won a gold medal in the table tennis doubles' tournament with his partner Simcha Lustig. The two reached the finals again in 1962. In 1965, he again won a gold medal in the doubles' tournament with his partner Baruch Hagai.

Abeles competed in table tennis at the 1960 Summer Paralympics.

At the 1968 Summer Paralympics he competed in swimming and in table tennis, winning a bronze medal in table tennis with his partner Moshe Gamishida.

== See also ==
- Israel at the Paralympics
