= Ruth Lamsbach =

German paralympic athlete

Personal information
- Born: 1950 (age 75–76) Bochum, West Germany

Sport
- Country: Germany / West Germany
- Sport: Para table tennis Paralympic athletics Para archery Paralympic swimming
Medal record
Representing Germany
Paralympic Games
Paralympic athletics
Gold medal – first place	1972 Heidelberg	Pentathlon 2
Paralympic swimming
Silver medal – second place	1968 Tel Aviv	25m breaststroke class 2 complete
Bronze medal – third place	1968 Tel Aviv	25m freestyle class 2 complete
Para table tennis
Gold medal – first place	1992 Barcelona	Teams C3
Bronze medal – third place	1992 Barcelona	Singles C3
World Para Table Tennis Championships
Gold medal – first place	1990 Assen	Singles C3
Gold medal – first place	1990 Assen	Teams C3
European Para Table Tennis Championships
Silver medal – second place	1991 Salou	Singles C3
Bronze medal – third place	1991 Salou	Open singles wheelchair
Bronze medal – third place	1991 Salou	Teams C3
Representing West Germany
Paralympic Games
Para table tennis
Silver medal – second place	1988 Seoul	Singles C2
Bronze medal – third place	1976 Toronto	Teams C4-5
Bronze medal – third place	1980 Arnhem	Singles C2
Wheelchair basketball
Silver medal – second place	1976 Toronto	Women's tournament

Ruth Lamsbach (born 1950) is a German paralympic athlete and multiple medalist at the Paralympic Games .

She received the Silver Laurel Leaf on June 23, 1993.

== Career ==
At the 1968 Summer Paralympic Games in Tel Aviv, she won a bronze medal in the 25 meters freestyle, and silver medal in breaststroke.

At the 1972 Summer Paralympics, she competed in both pentathlon and wheelchair tennis. She became a Paralympic champion in the pentathlon.

Since 1976, she transitioned to table tennis. She competed in the 1976 Summer Paralympics, and 1980 Summer Paralympics, winning a bronze medal in singles 2.

At the 1984 Summer Paralympics, she won a gold in Open 1B-4, and bronze in the singles 2 class.

She also took part in the 1988 Summer Paralympics winning a silver medal in Singles 2, and 1992 Paralympic Games winning a gold medal in 1992 in the Teams 3 class.

At the 1990 World Championships, she won the world title in singles and doubles.
