= Gwen Buck =

British Paralympic athlete

Gwen Buck BEM
Personal information
- Born: 1929 Richmond, England
- Died: 13 February 2005 (aged 75)

Sport
- Country: United Kingdom
- Sport: Paralympic athletics Paralympic swimming Para table tennis Paralympic lawn bowls
Medal record
Paralympic Games
Table Tennis
Gold medal – first place	1964 Tokyo	Women's Doubles B
Silver medal – second place	1968 Tel Aviv	Women's Doubles B
Silver medal – second place	1976 Toronto	Women's Teams 3
Bronze medal – third place	1972 Heidelberg	Women's Singles 3
Lawn Bowls
Gold medal – first place	1968 Tel Aviv	Women's Pairs
Gold medal – first place	1968 Tel Aviv	Women's Singles
Gold medal – first place	1972 Heidelberg	Women's Pairs
Bronze medal – third place	1976 Toronto	Women's Pairs wh
Bronze medal – third place	1976 Toronto	Women's Singles wh
Swimming
Gold medal – first place	1968 Tel Aviv	Women's 25 m Backstroke class 2 incomplete

Gwen Buck BEM (1929–13 February 2005) was a British Paralympic athlete who competed in several sporting disciplines. She won gold medals in table tennis, lawn bowls, and swimming, and entered several athletics events across four Paralympic Games.

== Personal life ==
Gwen Buck was born in Richmond, Surrey (now London), in 1929. She was going over a level crossing on her bicycle in 1943 when she was struck by a lorry. The accident left her with a broken back and a severed spine, and she would remain in St Peter's Hospital in Chertsey for several years. On transfer to Stoke Mandeville Hospital in 1946 she met Ludwig Guttmann who helped Buck learn to become independent as a wheelchair user. While there she developed a love for competitive sport, in particular table tennis, and she soon began competing in the Stoke Mandeville Games.

Buck moved to Worcester to attend college and train as a drawing officer tracer. She returned to Richmond, finding employment with the Ministry of Works. She met future husband and fellow wheelchair user John while there, and they married in 1951. The couple retired to Stoke Mandeville and John died in 1981. She died on 13 February 2005.

Alongside her own sporting accomplishments, Buck was always keen to encourage young people to participate. She was also consulted on the design of the Stoke Mandeville Stadium.

== Sporting career ==
Buck's love of competitive sport was nurtured at Stoke Mandeville Hospital and she became a regular participant in the Stoke Mandeville Games. By the early 1960s she was representing Great Britain at the Commonwealth Games and the Paralympic Games.

At the 1964 Games in Tokyo, Buck partnered with Susan Cunliffe-Lister, Countess of Swinton in the Women's Doubles B Table Tennis event, winning the gold medal. At the 1968 Games in Tel Aviv she spread out into a variety of other sports including lawn bowls, swimming, and three field athletics disciplines: discus, javelin, and shot put. She won gold in both the women's pairs and singles lawn bowls as well as the 25m backstroke swim. Her final gold medal came at the 1972 Games in Heidelberg for the women's pairs lawn bowls, and went on to gain further medals in 1976 before retiring for competitive sport.

Buck was awarded the British Empire Medal in the early 1970s and also received the Sportswoman of the Year award from the Sports Writers Guild.
