= Arieh Rubin =

Israeli Paralympic swimmer (born 1952)

Personal information
- Native name: אריה רובין
- Born: 1952 (age 73–74)

Sport
- Country: Israel
- Sport: Swimming; Wheelchair basketball Table tennis
- Disability: Polio
Medal record
Representing Israel
Paralympic Games
Swimming
Silver medal – second place	1968 Tel Aviv	100m breaststroke
Silver medal – second place	1968 Tel Aviv	3X25 medley
Bronze medal – third place	1968 Tel Aviv	50m breaststroke
Gold medal – first place	1972 Heidelberg	100m breaststroke
Silver medal – second place	1972 Heidelberg	100m freestyle
Silver medal – second place	1972 Heidelberg	3X50 medley
Gold medal – first place	1976 Toronto	4X100 relay
Table tennis
Gold medal – first place	1968 Tel Aviv	Doubles
Wheelchair basketball
Silver medal – second place	1976 Toronto	Men

Arieh Rubin (Hebrew: אריה רובין; born 1952) is an Israeli paralympic swimming champion. He competed at the 1968, 1972 and 1976, winning 9 medals

== Life ==
Wengier was born in 1952 and contracted polio when he was nine months old. He was trained at the Israel Sports Center for the Disabled.

At the 1968 Summer Paralympics, he won a gold medal with Baruch Hagai in the table tennis men's doubles tournament and three medals in swimming: 2 silver and one bronze. He won silver medals in the breaststroke swimming tournament for 100m and in the 3X25 individual medley tournament. He won the bronze medal in the 50m breaststroke swimming tournament.

At the 1972 Summer Paralympics, he won a gold medal in the 100m breaststroke swimming tournament and two silver medals: one in the 100m freestyle swimming tournament and another for the 3X50 individual medley.

At the 1976 Summer Paralympics, he won a gold medal as a member of the swimming team competing at the 4X100 medley relay and a silver medal as a member of Israel's wheelchair basketball team.

In 2007, Rubin was sentenced to four years in probation after a legal proceeding concerning allegations of indecent acts with a minor.

Rubin was married to paralympic athlete Zipora Rubin-Rosenbaum. He is divorced and a father of three.
