= Israel at the 1968 Summer Paralympics =

- IPC code: ISR
- NPC: Israel Paralympic Committee
- Website: www.isad.org.il

in Tel Aviv
- Competitors: 53
- Medals Ranked 3rd: Gold 18 Silver 21 Bronze 23 Total 62

Summer Paralympics appearances (overview)
- 1960; 1964; 1968; 1972; 1976; 1980; 1984; 1988; 1992; 1996; 2000; 2004; 2008; 2012; 2016; 2020; 2024

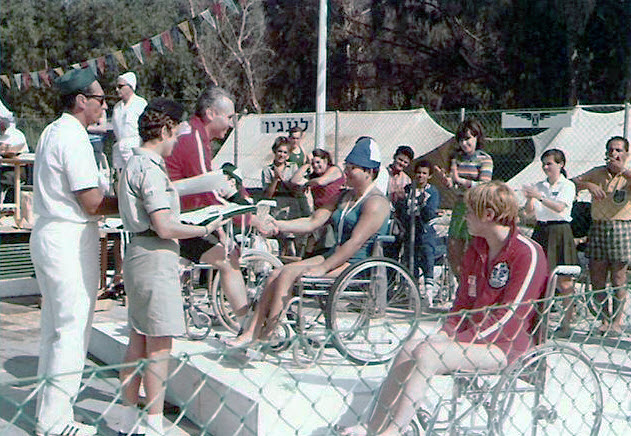
Ora Goldstein receiving Gold Medal

Israel was the host nation of the 1968 Summer Paralympics in Tel Aviv. The Israeli team finished third in the medal table and won sixty-two medals: eighteen gold, twenty-one silver and twenty-three bronze. Over 750 athletes from 28 nations took part in the Games; the Israeli team included 53 athletes, 37 men and 15 women. (Note: Data is taken from the International Paralympic Committee website and is based on information contained/sourced in the original hardcopy final results publications. Some information from earlier Paralympic Games (i.e. 1960–1984) is incomplete and is missing first names of some athletes)

== Background ==
Israel hosted these Games. Their desire to be the host stemmed from their desire to celebrate their country's 20th birthday. They got the Games after technical problems forced the Mexican government to withdraw from hosting the Games following the Olympics.

== Archery ==
Four Israeli archers competed at the Games, none won a medal.

In the St. Nicholas round for paraplegic women Even-Sahav finished seventh with 524 points. In the equivalent men's event Israeli athletes Feld, Kirschner and Even-Sahav finished twenty-fourth, twenty-third and twelfth respectively

== Athletics ==
Twenty-seven members of the Israeli team competed in athletics events, winning thirty-two medals, nine gold, eleven silver and twelve bronze. Zipora Rubin-Rosenbaum won gold medals in the club throw, javelin, shot put and pentathlon and a silver medal in the discus for the host nation. Other athletes that won multiple medals for Israel included; Halfon, who won two gold and two silver medals in women's special class field events; Ora Goldstein who won bronze medals in wheelchair racing and shot put; Mishani who took gold in the 60 metres wheelchair dash and also won four silver medals; and Siri who won two silver and four bronze medals.

== Table tennis ==
Nineteen table tennis players competed for Israel and won four gold, one silver and three bronze medals. Baruch Hagai won the gold medal in the men's singles C classification and teamed up with Arieh Rubin to also win gold in the doubles C.

== Wheelchair basketball ==
Israel entered teams in both the men's and women's wheelchair basketball events and won the gold medal in each. The women's event took the form of a single pool stage with medals awarded to the top three teams. Israel won all four of their matches scoring 67 points and conceding 17. The men's event featured a pool stage followed by a knockout competition. Israel beat France and the Netherlands to advance to the quarterfinals. They then beat Canada, France, for a second time, and the United States to take gold. The Israeli team was captained by Baruch Hagai.
