= Mati Angel =

Israeli swimmer (1938–2012)

Personal information
- Native name: מתי אנג'ל
- Born: 17 October 1938
- Died: 27 July 2012 (aged 73)

Sport
- Country: Israel
- Sport: Para swimming; Para table tennis
Medal record
Event / 1st / 2nd / 3rd; Paralympic Games / 2 / 3 / 1
Representing Israel
Paralympic Games
Swimming
Silver medal – second place	1960 Rome	25m breaststroke
Bronze medal – third place	1968 Tel Aviv	25m breaststroke
Table tennis
Silver medal – second place	1960 Rome	Singles A
Gold medal – first place	1968 Tel Aviv	Singles A2
Gold medal – first place	1968 Tel Aviv	Doubles A2
Bronze medal – third place	1972 Heidelberg	Singles 1A
Stoke Mandeville Games
Swimming
Gold medal – first place	1969

Mati Angel (Hebrew: מתי אנג'ל; 17 October 1938 – 27 July 2012) was an Israeli paralympic athlete who competes in para swimming and para table tennis. She was one of the first women to represent Israel at the paralympics. She competed in swimming in three Summer Games (1960, 1968 and 1972) and in table tennis in four Summer Games (1960, 1968, 1972 and 1980).

In addition to competing in the paralympics, Angel was an attorney and worked for thirty years at the District Attorney's office of the Tel Aviv District.

== Early life ==
Angel was born in Bulgaria and immigrated to Israel in 1948. She was drafted to the Israel Defense Forces in 1956 and was injured during the Suez Crisis.

== Career ==
=== Swimming ===
Angel swam the 25m breaststroke for Israel in the 1960, 1968, and 1972 Summer Paralympics. In 1960, she completed the race in 1:45.70 minutes, winning silver. In 1968, she came in third with a time of 2:03.00 minutes.

Angel also competed in the 1969 Stoke Mandeville Games, where she won gold.

=== Table tennis ===
Angel played table tennis for Israel in the 1960, 1968, 1972, and 1980 Summer Paralympics. In 1960, she received silver in the Singles A competition. In 1968, she competed in both the Singles A2 and Doubles A2, winning gold in both. She tied for bronze in Singles A1 in 1972. In 1980, she made it into the 1/8th finals for Singles 1B and quarterfinals for Women's Teams 2.

== See also ==
- Israel at the Paralympics
