= Marilyn Warren Woods =

American activist (1914–1998)

- Marilyn W. Woods, from a 1963 newspaper
- Born: January 15, 1914; Hudson, New Hampshire
- Died: June 12, 1998 (aged 84); Manchester, New Hampshire
- Occupations: Activist, community leader, athlete

Marilyn Warren Woods (January 15, 1914 – June 12, 1998) was an American activist and community leader. In her fifties, she competed in field events at two Pan American Wheelchair Games (1967 and 1969), and in the 1968 Summer Paralympics.

== Early life ==
Marilyn Lois Warren was born in Hudson, New Hampshire, the daughter of Oscar G. Warren and Ida Proctor Warren. She survived polio in infancy, was treated at Children's Hospital in Boston, MA. She spent months in casts from the nap of her neck to her toes, but did learn to walk (with crutches and braces on both legs) at the same age as other children. She spent much of her childhood in an orphanage in Nashua, New Hampshire. She graduated from Nashua High School and Nashua Business College. She used a wheelchair, leg braces, and arm crutches, and drove an adapted car.

== Career ==
Warren worked as a school counselor in Nashua, and for 43 years as a placement officer for the state employment service. She served on advisory councils on disability at the national and state levels. In 1957, she testified before a Congressional committee on disability services. She was a charter member of the National Association of the Physically Handicapped (NAPH), and president of the Nashua chapter; in 1963 she became the NAPH's first woman president. She was re-elected to a second term in 1965.

Woods was one of the founders of the New England Wheelchair Games. As an athlete, she competed at the Stoke-Mandeville Games in England in 1965. She won five medals at the first Pan American Wheelchair Games in 1967, in Winnipeg. In January 1968, she was named New Hampshire's Female Athlete of the Year at an annual banquet in Manchester. She also won a medal at the 1968 Summer Paralympics in Tel Aviv, competing in archery, shotput, and javelin events. In 1969, she was on the United States team at the Pan American Wheelchair Games in Buenos Aires.

She helped establish the Letitia Pratt Home for the Handicapped in Nashua. In the 1970s, she was director of the Letitia Pratt Foundation. She was active with the Golden Age Olympics program in the 1980s. In 1983, she was honored by the Nashua YWCA as a Distinguished Woman Leader. In 1993, Woods appeared on an episode of "On the Road with Charles Kuralt", in which she won a game of ping pong with host Charles Kuralt.

== Personal life ==
Warren married Adelbert Nelson Woods in 1948. They had a son, David. She retired in 1979. Her husband died in 1989, and she died in 1998, aged 84 years, at a nursing home in Manchester, New Hampshire.
