= Denmark at the 1968 Summer Paralympics =

- IPC code: DEN (DIN used at these Games)
- NPC: Paralympic Committee Denmark
- Website: www.paralympic.dk

in Tel Aviv
- Competitors: 8
- Medals: Gold 0 Silver 0 Bronze 0 Total 0

Summer Paralympics appearances (overview)
- 1968; 1972; 1976; 1980; 1984; 1988; 1992; 1996; 2000; 2004; 2008; 2012; 2016; 2020; 2024

Denmark sent a delegation to the 1968 Summer Paralympics in Tel Aviv, Israel, from November 4 to 13, 1968. Eight Danish athletes competed, seven men and one woman. The team did not win any medals.

== See also ==
- Denmark at the 1968 Summer Olympics
