= Johann Igel =

Austrian paralympic swimmer

Personal information
- Full name: Johann Igel
- Nationality: Austria
- Born: 25 June 1937 Upper Austria, Austria
- Died: 23 November 2012 (aged 75) Upper Austria, Austria

Sport
- Sport: Swimming
Medal record
Event	1st	2nd	3rd
1960 Summer Paralympics	1	1	1
1968 Summer Paralympics	0	1	1
1972 Summer Paralympics	0	0	0
Total	1	2	2
Representing Austria
Men's Swimming
Paralympic Games
Gold medal – first place	1960 Rome	50 m crawl
Silver medal – second place	1960 Rome	50 m backstroke
Bronze medal – third place	1960 Rome	50 m breaststroke
Silver medal – second place	1968 Tel Aviv	50 m freestyle
Bronze medal – third place	1968 Tel Aviv	50 m breaststroke

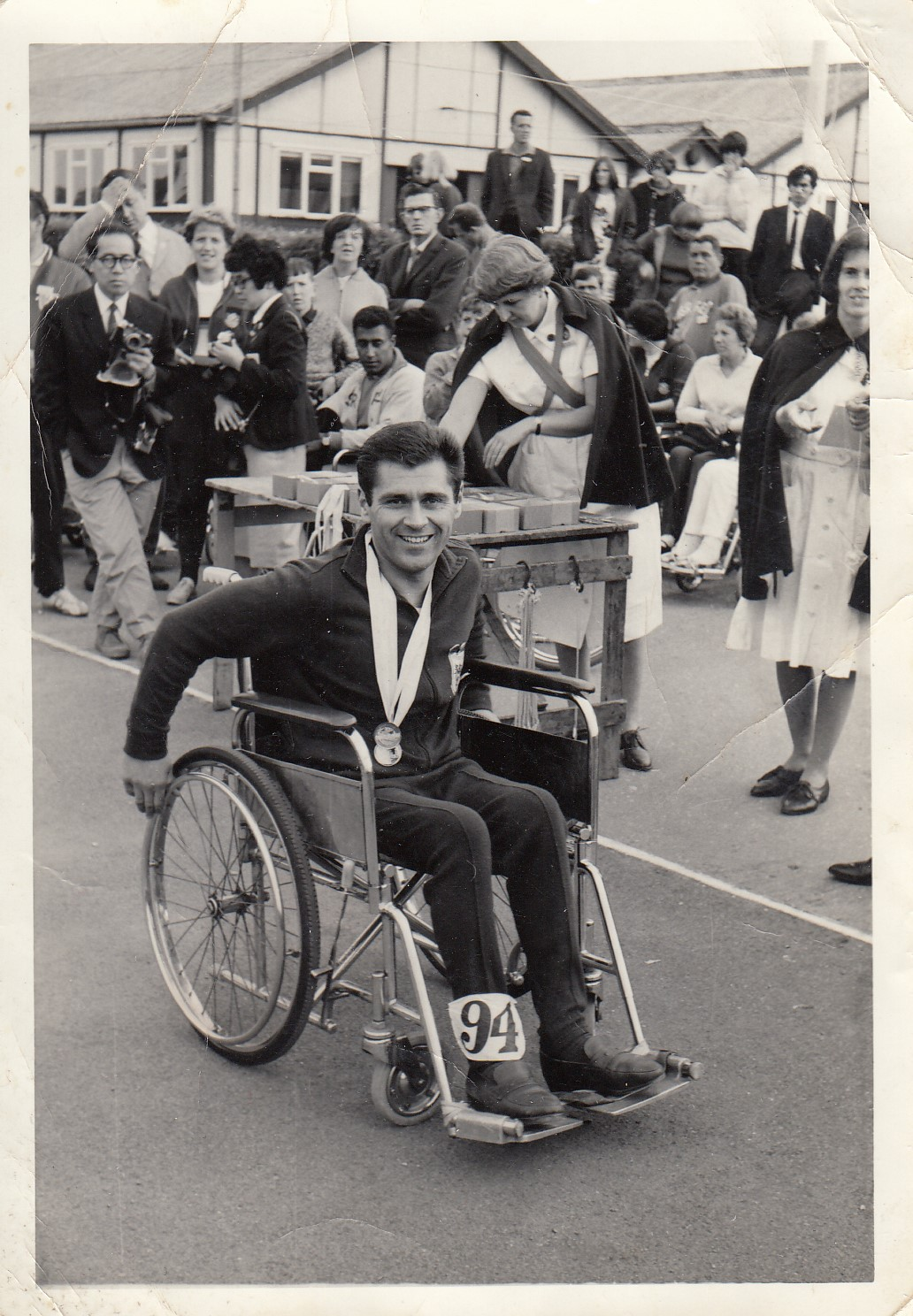
Johann Igel in Rome 1960

Johann Igel (25 June 1937 – 23 November 2012) was a pioneering Austrian para-swimmer who achieved notable success in the early Paralympic Games, representing Austria in the 1960s.

Competing at the inaugural Paralympic Games in Rome, Italy, in 1960, Igel won three medals: a gold in the 50-meter freestyle, silver in the 50-meter backstroke, and bronze in the 50-meter breaststroke. He was among the first Austrian athletes to win medals at international para-sports. Igel competed at the 1968 Paralympics in Tel Aviv, Israel. He won a silver medal in the 50-meter freestyle and another bronze in the 50-meter breaststroke. Igel competed at the 1972 Paralympics in Heidelberg, Germany, where he placed fifth in both the 3x25 meter Individual Medley Relay and the 50-meter freestyle.
