= Eve Rimmer =

New Zealand Paralympic athlete

Personal information
- Full name: Eva Marion Rimmer
- Born: Eva Marion Davies; 3 April 1937 Whanganui, New Zealand
- Died: 23 November 1996 (aged 59)
Medal record
Representing New Zealand
Paralympic Games
Women's para athletics
Gold medal – first place	1968 Tel Aviv	Javelin throw C
Silver medal – second place	1968 Tel Aviv	Shot put C
Bronze medal – third place	1968 Tel Aviv	Discus throw C
Gold medal – first place	1972 Heidelberg	Pentathlon 3
Gold medal – first place	1972 Heidelberg	Shot put 3
Silver medal – second place	1972 Heidelberg	Discus throw 3
Silver medal – second place	1972 Heidelberg	Javelin 3
Gold medal – first place	1976 Toronto	Pentathlon 3
Gold medal – first place	1976 Toronto	Discus throw 3
Gold medal – first place	1976 Toronto	Javelin 3
Gold medal – first place	1976 Toronto	Shot put 3
Gold medal – first place	1980 Arnhem	Shot put 3
Women's para swimming
Silver medal – second place	1968 Tel Aviv	50 m freestyle class 4 complete
Women's para archery
Silver medal – second place	1980 Arnhem	Advanced metric round paraplegic

Eva Marion "Eve" Rimmer née Davies BEM (3 April 1937 – 23 November 1996) was a New Zealand Paralympic athlete. She was born in Whanganui, New Zealand and became one of New Zealand's greatest paraplegic athletes, winning 32 medals – including 22 gold medals – for athletics and swimming at international sporting events. Growing up in the small rural town of Edgecumbe, Eve was a talented young athlete. As Eve says in her biography "On natural ability alone, I held the school's long jump record for many years". This made up for her poor academic credentials. As soon as she was old enough she left school. In 1952 at age fifteen, Eve was left paralysed from the waist down when the vehicle she was in crashed on a dark wet night. This life changing experience did not prevent Eve Rimmer from becoming one of the best athletes in the world. She went on to be a multi-medal winner in shot put, javelin, pentathlon, discus, swimming and archery, In 1973 she received the British Empire Medal.

The same spirit was shown in her personal life. She married Kelvin Stanley (Kel) Rimmer, a radio engineer, and despite being told she would probably never be able to conceive, gave birth to two healthy girls. Eve Rimmer has since been regarded as an inspiration to those with disabilities and able-bodied people. She was actively involved with the paraplegic organisations throughout New Zealand. She gave many paraplegics throughout the world the ability to believe that they could achieve anything they wanted to.

It is understanding that people with disabilities want, not sympathy.

People who have disabilities are normal people who can play a normal part in life. If I have got this message across to just some people, I

have contributed something

— Eve discussing how she wanted her speaking engagements to impact others

== Representations ==
Eve the world's leading paraplegic field events athlete in action at Stoke Mandeville – the shot, the javelin, the discus.

Two golds and a bronze at the home of para sport. The medal presentation at the Stoke Mandeville international para games in 1972.

Eve Rimmer was the first woman selected to represent New Zealand at the Paralympics. She was the only female named along with fourteen men to go to the 1968 Tel Aviv Games and the only one to bring home medals. She continued to represent New Zealand at the games in Heidelberg (1972), Toronto (1976) and Arnhem (1980), winning a total of 14 Paralympic medals, of which 8 were gold. Eve was also very successful in the Commonwealth Paraplegic Games and at domestic competitions.

== Achievements ==
As well as winning many Paralympic and Commonwealth medals, Eve Rimmer has been honoured for her many achievements including being named the Bay of Plenty Sportsperson of the Year in 1992. She was the founder of the Disabilities Resource Centre in Whakatāne and was the organiser of the 1990 Games for Disabled in Whakatāne, an event which has grown into the Eve Rimmer Games held Easter weekend every two years. In 1990, Eve was inducted into the New Zealand Sports Hall of Fame due to her domination in paraplegic sport over the years. Rimmer was also runner up for the New Zealand Sportsman of the year title in 1972. In the 1973 New Year Honours, Rimmer was awarded the British Empire Medal, for services to paraplegics. Eve was a very big influence on sports in Whakatāne and the Council honoured her by naming a sports ground after her. The Eve Rimmer Park is used for rugby league, netball and bmx.

I would swap them all, everything I've had out of life, for two ordinary legs that work.

To get up and dance again. To run down the beach and plunge into the sea. To ride a bike through the countryside. To walk free with the wind in my face.

To feel the grass between my toes.

— Eve discussing the fact that although she has had great achievements she regrets the things that normal people can do
