= Judy Webb =

British ecologist

Judith "Judy" Ann Webb MBE BEM is an ecologist and conservationist.

== Biography ==
Webb studied Botany and Zoology at university and subsequently taught at Milham Ford School, Oxford.

She is a practical field ecologist and has been involved with conservation through advising and leading local Oxfordshire organisations since the 1990s. This has included making extensive records of the flora and fauna of Oxfordshire, public speaking and organising official re-introductions of plants such as creeping marshwort (Apium repens) at Cutteslowe Pond.

She is the Assistant Editor of the Bulletin of the Dipterists Forum and the Chair of the Friends of Lye Valley that she founded in 2013.

=== Awards and honours ===
Webb was awarded a Certificate of Honour from Oxford City Council on 19 June 2017 in recognition of her voluntary and advocacy work for the environment in Oxfordshire. She was included as one of the 30 women in the BBC Woman's Hour 'Power List:Our Planet' in 2020.

Webb was appointed Member of the Order of the British Empire (MBE) in the 2011 Birthday Honours for "services to Conservation in England and Wales", and was awarded the British Empire Medal (BEM) in the 2021 New Year Honours for "services to Conservation of Wildlife and Habitats in Oxfordshire".
