= Norway at the 1968 Summer Paralympics =

- IPC code: NOR
- NPC: Norwegian Olympic and Paralympic Committee and Confederation of Sports
- Website: www.idrett.no (in Norwegian)

in Tel Aviv
- Medals Ranked 13th: Gold 5 Silver 3 Bronze 1 Total 9

Summer Paralympics appearances (overview)
- 1960; 1964; 1968; 1972; 1976; 1980; 1984; 1988; 1992; 1996; 2000; 2004; 2008; 2012; 2016; 2020; 2024

Norway competed at the 1968 Summer Paralympics in Tel Aviv, Israel. The team finished thirteenth in the medal table and won a total of 9 medals; 5 gold, 13 silver and 1 bronze.

== Medalists ==
Medal	Name	Sport	Event
Gold	Harald Gunnerup	Swimming	Men's 50m freestyle class 3 incomplete
Gold	Paul Jacobsen	Swimming	Men's 50m backstroke class 3 incomplete
Gold	Harald Gunnerup	Swimming	Men's 50m breaststroke class 3 incomplete
Gold	Tora Lysoe	Table tennis	Women's doubles A2
Gold	Vidar Johnsen	Weightlifting	Men's lightweight
Silver	Eskild Hansen	Swimming	Men's 50m backstroke class 3 complete
Silver	Jan Erik Stenberg	Table tennis	Men's singles A1
Silver	Tora Lysoe	Table tennis	Women's singles A2
Bronze	Birgith Reklev	Swimming	Women's 50m backstroke class 4 incomplete

== See also ==
- Norway at the Paralympics
- Norway at the 1968 Summer Olympics
