= Japan at the 1968 Summer Paralympics =

- IPC code: JPN
- NPC: Japan Paralympic Committee
- Website: www.jsad.or.jp (in Japanese)

in Tel Aviv
- Competitors: 48
- Medals Ranked 16th: Gold 2 Silver 2 Bronze 8 Total 12

Summer Paralympics appearances (overview)
- 1964; 1968; 1972; 1976; 1980; 1984; 1988; 1992; 1996; 2000; 2004; 2008; 2012; 2016; 2020; 2024

Japan competed at the 1968 Summer Paralympics in Tel Aviv, Israel from November 4 to 13, 1968. The team finished sixteenth of the twenty-eight competing nations in the medal table and won a total of twelve medals; two gold, two silver and eight bronze. Forty-eight Japanese athletes took part in the Games; forty-one men and seven women. (Note: Data is taken from the International Paralympic Committee website and is based on information contained/sourced in the original hardcopy final results publications. Some information from earlier Paralympic Games (i.e. 1960 – 1984) is incomplete and is missing first names of some athletes)

== Disability classifications ==
The Paralympics groups athletes' disabilities into one of five disability categories; amputation, the condition may be congenital or sustained through injury or illness; cerebral palsy; wheelchair athletes, there is often overlap between this and other categories; visual impairment, including blindness; Les autres, any physical disability that does not fall strictly under one of the other categories, for example dwarfism or multiple sclerosis. Each Paralympic sport then has its own classifications, dependent on the specific physical demands of competition. Events are given a code, made of numbers and letters, describing the type of event and classification of the athletes competing.

== Athletics ==
Eight of Japan's medals were won in athletics events. All three medals in the men's slalom C were won by Japanese athletes; Furukawa won gold, Erkawa won silver and the bronze went to Tsuchiya. Bronze medals were also won by Sakonju, in both the men's A slalom and novices 60 m wheelchair dash A, Suga in the men's B slalom and Miyazawa in the men's 100 m wheelchair C race. The only athletics medal won by a Japanese woman at the Games was a silver for Apai in the women's C slalom.

== Dartchery ==
The only dartchery event at the Games was the mixed pairs event which had a knockout tournament format. Japan was represented by Tanaka and T. Matsumoto; the pair beat athletes from Canada, Belgium and Switzerland to set up a semi-final meeting with Geissinger and Kelderhouse of the United States. The Americans won the match and went on to win the gold medal, Tanaka and Matsumoto were awarded bronze medals.

== Swimming ==
Six members of the Japanese delegation competed in swimming events and two won medals. Koyachi won the gold medal in the men's 50 metres freestyle class 4 incomplete, beating his nearest rival in the final by 2.4 seconds. In the men's 50 m freestyle class 4 complete Japan's Arimura finished with the same time as silver medalist, Lewis of South Africa, but was awarded the bronze medal.

== Weightlifting ==
Three men entered weightlifting events for Japan, all in the featherweight division. Nagumo won the bronze medal with a lift of 110 kg, Mayazawa finished fifth and Kojima seventh with lifts of 107.5 kg and 100 kg respectively.

== See also ==
- Japan at the 1968 Summer Olympics
