= France at the 1968 Summer Paralympics =

- IPC code: FRA
- NPC: French Paralympic and Sports Committee
- Website: france-paralympique.fr

in Tel Aviv
- Competitors: 54 in 6 sports
- Medals Ranked 2nd: Gold 13 Silver 10 Bronze 9 Total 32

Summer Paralympics appearances (overview)
- 1960; 1964; 1968; 1972; 1976; 1980; 1984; 1988; 1992; 1996; 2000; 2004; 2008; 2012; 2016; 2020; 2024

France competed at the 1968 Summer Paralympics in Tel Aviv, Israel from November 4 to 13, 1968. The French team contained fifty-five athletes; forty-one men and fourteen women (Note: Data is taken from the International Paralympic Committee website and is based on information contained/sourced in the original hardcopy final results publications. Some information from earlier Paralympic Games (ie 1960 - 1984) is incomplete and is missing first names of some athletes) . The team finished fifth in the medal table and won a total of thirty-two medals; thirteen gold, ten silver and nine bronze.

== Medalists ==
Medal	Name	Sport	Event
Gold	Mireille Marraschin	Archery	Women's Columbia round open
Gold	Girard	Archery	Women's St. Nicholas round paraplegic
Gold	Thibaut	Athletics	Women's novices 60m wheelchair dash A
Gold	Sparsa	Swimming	Men's 25m freestyle class 1 complete
Gold	Daniel Jeannin	Swimming	Men's 25m freestyle class 1 incomplete
Gold	Sparsa	Swimming	Men's 25m backstroke class 1 complete
Gold	Daniel Jeannin	Swimming	Men's 25m backstroke class 1 incomplete
Gold	Cestier	Swimming	Men's 3x25m individual medley open
Gold	Jardine	Swimming	Women's 50m freestyle class 5 (cauda equina)
Gold	Dumont	Weightlifting	Men's featherweight
Gold	Men's team	Wheelchair fencing	Men's épée team
Gold	Men's team	Wheelchair fencing	Men's sabre team
Gold	Delattre	Wheelchair fencing	Women's foil individual
Silver	Nadal	Archery	Men's St. Nicholas round paraplegic
Silver	Cestier	Swimming	Men's 50m freestyle special class
Silver	Claude Sugny	Swimming	Men's 25m backstroke class 2 incomplete
Silver	Sparsa	Swimming	Men's 25m breaststroke class 1 complete
Silver	Jardine	Swimming	Women's 100m freestyle open
Silver	Brifoulliere	Weightlifting	Men's middleweight
Silver	Men's team	Wheelchair fencing	Men's foil team
Silver	Serge Bec	Wheelchair fencing	Men's sabre individual
Silver	Pequin	Wheelchair fencing	Women's novices foil
Silver	Women's team	Wheelchair fencing	Women's foil team
Bronze	René David; Trouverie; Ventadour	Archery	Men's Albion round team open
Bronze	Guesnon	Archery	Men's St. Nicholas round paraplegic
Bronze	Belasset; Sylviane Guesnon	Lawn bowls	Women's pairs
Bronze	Belasset	Lawn bowls	Women's singles
Bronze	Claude Sugny	Swimming	Men's 25m freestyle class 2 incomplete
Bronze	Cestier	Swimming	Men's 50m backstroke special class
Bronze	Daniel Jeannin	Swimming	Men's 25m breaststroke class 1 incomplete
Bronze	Cardon	Swimming	Women's 50m freestyle class 3 incomplete
Bronze	Serge Bec	Wheelchair fencing	Men's épée individual

== Archery ==
Twelve French archers, ten men and two women, competed at the Games winning seven medals; two gold, one silver and four bronze. In the men's St. Nicholas round event for paraplegics France won two medals; Nadal won silver and Guesnon bronze, the gold medal was won by Arballo of United States with a new world record score of 730 points.

== See also ==
- France at the Paralympics
- France at the 1968 Summer Olympics
