= United States at the 1968 Summer Paralympics =

- Flag of the United States
- IPC code: USA (EUA used at these Games)
- NPC: United States Paralympic Committee
- Website: www.teamusa.org/US-Paralympics

in Tel Aviv
- Competitors: 82 in 9 sports
- Medals Ranked 1st: Gold 33 Silver 27 Bronze 39 Total 99

Summer Paralympics appearances (overview)
- 1960; 1964; 1968; 1972; 1976; 1980; 1984; 1988; 1992; 1996; 2000; 2004; 2008; 2012; 2016; 2020; 2024

The United States competed at the 1968 Summer Paralympics in Tel Aviv, Israel from November 4 to 13, 1968. The team finished first out of the twenty-eight competing nations in the medal table and won ninety-nine medals: thirty-three gold, twenty-seven silver and thirty-nine bronze. Eighty-two American athletes took part; fifty-three men and twenty-nine women. (Note: Data is taken from the International Paralympic Committee website and is based on information contained/sourced in the original hardcopy final results publications. Some information from earlier Paralympic Games (i.e. 1960 – 1984) is incomplete and is missing first names of some athletes)

Ed Owen won medals in six different sports; nine golds and a bronze in athletics, two golds in swimming and a silver in wheelchair basketball.

== Disability classifications ==
The Paralympics groups athletes' disabilities into one of five disability categories; amputation, the condition may be congenital or sustained through injury or illness; cerebral palsy; wheelchair athletes, there is often overlap between this and other categories; visual impairment, including blindness; Les autres, any physical disability that does not fall strictly under one of the other categories, for example dwarfism or multiple sclerosis. Each Paralympic sport then has its own classifications, dependent upon the specific physical demands of competition. Events are given a code, made of numbers and letters, describing the type of event and classification of the athletes competing.

== Medalists ==
The following United States athletes won medals at the Games;

Medal	Name	Sport	Event
Gold	Arballo	Archery	Men's St. Nicholas round paraplegic
Gold	Classon; Reno Levis; O'Donnell	Archery	Men's Columbia round team open
Gold	Geissinger; Kelderhouse; Klemens	Archery	Men's Albion round team open
Gold	Branum; Chess; Gary Odorowski; Roman	Athletics	Men's 4x40 m relay open
Gold	E. Cox; C. Giesse; Keyser; Stratman	Athletics	Women's 4x40 m relay open
Gold	C. Geisse	Athletics	Women's 60 m wheelchair A
Gold	C. Giesse	Athletics	Women's slalom A
Gold	Rosalie Hixson	Athletics	Women's javelin throw B
Gold	Kirn	Athletics	Women's javelin throw A
Gold	Kirn	Athletics	Women's shot put A
Gold	Gary Odorowski	Athletics	Men's 100 m wheelchair C
Gold	Ed Owen	Athletics	Men's club throw special class
Gold	Ed Owen	Athletics	Men's discus throw special class
Gold	Ed Owen	Athletics	Men's pentathlon special class
Gold	Ed Owen	Athletics	Men's shot put special class
Gold	Roman	Athletics	Men's Novices 60 m wheelchair Dash C
Gold	H. Smith	Athletics	Men's club throw C
Gold	H. Smith	Athletics	Men's pentathlon incomplete
Gold	David Williamson	Athletics	Men's javelin throw B
Gold	Geissinger; Kelderhouse	Dartchery	Mixed Pairs open
Gold	Ailes	Swimming	Women's 50 m breaststroke class 4 complete
Gold	Ailes	Swimming	Women's 50 m freestyle class 4 complete
Gold	Branum	Swimming	Men's 100 m freestyle open
Gold	Chrysler	Swimming	Men's 50 m backstroke class 3 complete
Gold	Chrysler	Swimming	Men's 50 m freestyle class 3 complete
Gold	Crase	Swimming	Men's 25 m breaststroke class 1 complete
Gold	Foust	Swimming	Men's 50 m freestyle class 4 complete
Gold	Gorman	Swimming	Women's 25 m breaststroke class 1 complete
Gold	Kaminski	Swimming	Women's 50 m backstroke class 4 complete
Gold	Moore	Swimming	Women's 25 m freestyle class 1 complete
Gold	Ed Owen	Swimming	Men's 100 m breaststroke open
Gold	Ed Owen	Swimming	Men's 50 m breaststroke special class
Gold	Dunn; McNichol	Table tennis	Men's doubles A1
Silver	Reno Levis	Archery	Men's Columbia round open
Silver	Soulek	Archery	Women's Columbia round open
Silver	Webb	Archery	Women's Albion round open
Silver	Branum	Athletics	Men's 100 m wheelchair C
Silver	Branum	Athletics	Men's pentathlon special class
Silver	Cameron	Athletics	Men's javelin throw special class
Silver	Demorest	Athletics	Men's discus throw special class
Silver	Gianino	Athletics	Men's slalom cervical class
Silver	Gurman	Athletics	Women's slalom cervical class
Silver	Keyser	Athletics	Women's 60 m wheelchair C
Silver	Kirn	Athletics	Women's 60 m wheelchair A
Silver	H. Smith	Athletics	Men's discus throw C
Silver	David Williamson	Athletics	Men's 100 m wheelchair B
Silver	David Williamson	Athletics	Men's club throw B
Silver	Rosalie Hixson; Marilyn Warren Woods	Lawn bowls	Women's Pairs
Silver	Soulek	Lawn bowls	Women's singles
Silver	Branum	Swimming	Men's 50 m backstroke special class
Silver	Cornett	Swimming	Women's 25 m freestyle class 2 complete
Silver	Crase	Swimming	Men's 25 m freestyle class 1 complete
Silver	Gorman	Swimming	Women's 25 m backstroke class 1 complete
Silver	Gorman	Swimming	Women's 25 m freestyle class 1 complete
Silver	Moore	Swimming	Women's 25 m breaststroke class 1 complete
Silver	Moore	Swimming	Women's 25 m freestyle class 2 incomplete
Silver	Pollock	Swimming	Men's 50 m freestyle class 4 incomplete
Silver	Soulek	Swimming	Women's 25 m backstroke class 2 complete
Silver	Vincent	Swimming	Men's 25 m backstroke class 2 complete
Silver		Wheelchair basketball	Men
Bronze	Cornett	Archery	Women's Columbia round open
Bronze	Geissinger; Kelderhouse; Klemens	Archery	Men's FITA round team open
Bronze	Klemens	Archery	Men's Albion round open
Bronze	Moore	Archery	Women's St. Nicholas round paraplegic
Bronze	Webb	Archery	Women's FITA round open
Bronze	Arballo	Athletics	Men's discus throw C
Bronze	Bindley	Athletics	Women's discus throw B
Bronze	Cameron	Athletics	Men's club throw special class
Bronze	Chrysler	Athletics	Men's shot put C
Bronze	Cornett	Athletics	Women's 60 m wheelchair A
Bronze	Cornett	Athletics	Women's pentathlon complete
Bronze	Cornett	Athletics	Women's slalom A
Bronze	Dunn	Athletics	Men's slalom cervical class
Bronze	Feltes	Athletics	Men's Novices 60 m wheelchair Dash C
Bronze	Rosalie Hixson	Athletics	Women's Precision javelin throw open
Bronze	Rosalie Hixson	Athletics	Women's shot put B
Bronze	Kirn	Athletics	Women's club throw A
Bronze	Kirn	Athletics	Women's discus throw A
Bronze	Reno Levis	Athletics	Men's javelin throw C
Bronze	Reno Levis	Athletics	Men's Precision javelin throw open
Bronze	Ed Owen	Athletics	Men's javelin throw special class
Bronze	Rosalie Hixson	Lawn bowls	Women's singles
Bronze	Lionetti	Lawn bowls	Men's singles
Bronze	C. Sandglass; Vincent	Lawn bowls	Men's Pairs
Bronze		Swimming	Men's 3x50 m medley relay open
Bronze	Branum	Swimming	Men's 3x25 m individual medley open
Bronze	Cornett	Swimming	Women's 25 m breaststroke class 2 complete
Bronze	Dunn	Swimming	Men's 25 m backstroke class 1 complete
Bronze	Fiorello	Swimming	Men's 50 m backstroke class 3 incomplete
Bronze	Stratman	Swimming	Women's 50 m backstroke class 5 (cauda equina)
Bronze	Vincent	Swimming	Men's 25 m breaststroke class 2 complete
Bronze	Vincent	Swimming	Men's 25 m freestyle class 2 complete
Bronze	Crase; Donaldson	Table tennis	Men's doubles A1
Bronze	Gorman; Moore	Table tennis	Women's doubles A2
Bronze	McNichol	Table tennis	Men's singles A1
Bronze	Moore	Table tennis	Women's singles A1
Bronze	Jensen	Weightlifting	Men's Middleweight
Bronze	Rossini	Weightlifting	Men's Heavyweight
Bronze		Wheelchair basketball	Women

== Dartchery ==
The only dartchery event at the Games was the mixed pairs event which took a knockout format. The United States was represented by Geissinger and Kelderhouse; the pair beat athletes from Jamaica, Italy and Australia to set up a semi-final meeting with Tanaka and Matsumoto of Japan. The Americans won the match and went on to defeat a second Australian pair in the final round to win the gold medal.

== Wheelchair basketball ==
America entered teams in both the men's and women's wheelchair basketball events and won medals in each. The women's event took the form of a single pool stage with medals awarded to the top three teams. The USA team won two matches and lost two matches, scoring 31 points and conceding 30, to finish in third place and take the bronze medal. The men's event featured a pool stage followed by a knockout competition. The USA men beat Great Britain and the Switzerland and Germany to advance to the quarterfinals. They then beat Argentina and Great Britain again to reach the gold medal match. Facing the hosts Israel, USA lost 47–37 and had to settle for the silver medals.

== See also ==
- United States at the 1968 Summer Olympics
