= Rosalie Hixson =

American athlete (1944–2006)

- Rosalie Hixson, from a 1967 newspaper
- Born: Rosalie Joyce Hixson; November 19, 1944; Crystal Spring, Pennsylvania
- Died: February 3, 2006; Johnstown, Pennsylvania
- Other names: Rosalie Wiherin (married name)
- Occupation: Wheelchair athlete
- Known for: 1964, 1968, 1972, and 1976 Paralympic Games; 1967 and 1969 Pan American Wheelchair Games

Rosalie Joyce Hixson (November 19, 1944 – February 3, 2006), later Rosalie Wiherin, was an American wheelchair athlete. She earned medals at the 1964, 1968, 1972, and 1976 Paralympic Games.

== Early life ==
Rosalie Joyce Hixson was born in Crystal Spring, Pennsylvania, the daughter of Guy Newton Hixson and Junia May Duvall Hixson. Her family ran a farm, and she was on the track team in high school. She became paralyzed as a teenager, in 1959, from polio. She trained as an athlete at the Hiram G. Andrews Rehabilitation Center in Johnstown, Pennsylvania. She graduated from Southern Fulton High School in 1962, and attended Elizabethtown College.

== Career ==
Hixson earned eight gold medals, four silver medals, and six bronze medals across four summer Paralympic Games, from 1964 to 1976. At the 1964 Paralympics, held in Tokyo, she earned medals in swimming, club throw, discus throw, shot put, and javelin events. At the 1968 Paralympics, held in Tel Aviv, she won medals in shot put, javelin, and women's pairs lawn bowls events. At the 1972 Paralympics, held in Heidelberg, she won medals pentathlon, javelin, and discus throw events. And at the 1976 Paralympics, held in Toronto, she won medals in table tennis and javelin events.

Hixson competed at Stoke-Mandeville International Games in England in 1963 and 1966, at the first Pan American Wheelchair Games in WInnipeg in 1967, and at the second Pan American Wheelchair Games in Buenos Aires in 1969, winning multiple medals. She also competed at the National Wheelchair Games in 1963, 1964, 1966, 1967, 1971, and 1976. She held several world records in javelin and shot put, and was a member of the Central Penn Wheelers. "Sports was always my life even before my disability," she told a reporter in 1976. "I don't walk. What's the big deal about that? Life doesn't consist of two legs."

Hixson was congratulated by a resolution of the Pennsylvania State Senate in 1965. In 1971, she became the first woman elected to the National Wheelchair Athletic Hall of Fame. In 1976, she was named to Pennsylvania's Council on Physical Fitness by Governor Milton Schapp. Away from sports, Hixson earned a living as a secretary, a therapy aide at a children's hospital, a small businesswoman, and a child care provider. She was Ms. Wheelchair Philadelphia in 1975, competing for Ms. Wheelchair America.

== Personal life ==
Rosalie Hixson married electrical engineer Walter Wiherin in 1979. They had a daughter, Elisa. She was widowed in 2003, and she died at a hospital in Johnstown in 2006, aged 61 years, from complications of diabetes. She was posthumously named to the Fulton County All-Sports Hall of Fame in 2014.
