= Vic Renalson =

Personal information
- Full name: Victor Allen Renalson
- Nationality: Australia
- Born: 1926/27
- Died: July 1998 (age 71) Sunshine Coast, Queensland
Medal record
Athletics
Paralympic Games
Gold medal – first place	1968 Tel Aviv	Men's Club Throw A
Gold medal – first place	1968 Tel Aviv	Men's Discus A
Silver medal – second place	1968 Tel Aviv	Men's Javelin A
Silver medal – second place	1972 Heidelberg	Men's Discus 3
Bronze medal – third place	1968 Tel Aviv	Men's Shot Put A
Bronze medal – third place	1972 Heidelberg	Men's Precision Javelin open
Weightlifting
Paralympic Games
Gold medal – first place	1968 Tel Aviv	Men's Heavyweight
Gold medal – first place	1972 Heidelberg	Men's Heavyweight
Gold medal – first place	1976 Toronto	Men's Middleweight
Silver medal – second place	1964 Tokyo	Men's Heavyweight

Victor "Vic" Allen Renalson, MBE (1926/27 – July 1998) was an Australian athlete, weightlifter, and track and field coach. He won ten medals at four Paralympics from 1964 to 1976, and worked as a track and field coach for both Olympic and Paralympic athletes.

== Personal life ==
Renalson became a paraplegic after a car accident in 1951 at the age of 23. He was working as a fitter and Turner and was driving to North Queensland to work on a sugarcane plantation when the steering on his car failed near Sarina. The car hit a bridge and he was thrown 6 metres (20 ft) to a dry creek bed. He was married to Laurel, a former Queensland netballer and Australian walking champion, who died in 1992. He died in July 1998 on Queensland's Sunshine Coast at the age of 71.

== Career ==
Renalson won medals in weightlifting at all four Paralympics from 1964 to 1976: a silver medal in the Men's Heavyweight event at the 1964 Tokyo Games, a gold medal in the Men's Heavyweight event at both the 1968 Tel Aviv and 1972 Heidelberg Games, and a gold medal in the Men's Middleweight event at the 1976 Toronto Games. He participated in athletics at three Paralympics from 1968 to 1976; in 1968 he won two gold medals in the Men's Club Throw A and Men's Discus A events, a silver medal in the Men's Javelin A event, and a bronze medal in the Men's Shot Put A event, and in 1972 he won a silver medal in the Men's Discus 3 event and a bronze medal in the Men's Precision Javelin open event.

A lifelong member of the Toowong Harriers Club, he coached Olympians Norma Croker, Eric Bigby, and Pat Duggan. Bigby said of him:

Vic was a man ahead of his time. It's true to say he got me to the Tokyo Games in 1964 and he was one of the first coaches to incorporate weight training for track athletes. He was a very inspirational individual who engendered a spirit of adventure, enthusiasm and enjoyment. Those who worked with him never viewed Vic as a man in a wheelchair.

He was Australia's head track and field coach at the 1988 Seoul Paralympics, and worked with the Australian Institute of Sport as a satellite track and field coach from 1987 to 1993.

== Recognition ==
Renalson was a finalist in the ABC Sportsman of the Year award in 1968, and became a member of the Order of the British Empire in 1973 for services to sport and the community.
