= Netherlands at the 1968 Summer Paralympics =

- Flag of the Netherlands
- IPC code: NED (HOL used at these Games)
- NPC: Nederlands Olympisch Comité * Nederlandse Sport Federatie
- Website: paralympisch.nl (in Dutch)

in Tel Aviv
- Competitors: 35 (24 men and 11 women)
- Medals Ranked 8th: Gold 12 Silver 4 Bronze 4 Total 20

Summer Paralympics appearances (overview)
- 1960; 1964; 1968; 1972; 1976; 1980; 1984; 1988; 1992; 1996; 2000; 2004; 2008; 2012; 2016; 2020; 2024

Netherlands competed at the 1968 Summer Paralympics in Tel Aviv, Israel. The team included 35 athletes, 24 men and 11 women. Competitors from Netherlands won 20 medals, including 12 gold, 4 silver and 4 bronze to finish 8th in the medal table.

== Medalists ==
Medal	Name	Sport	Event
Gold	Popke Popkema	Archery	Men's FITA Round open
Gold	John van der Starre (backstroke); Cees Broekman (breaststroke); Piet Makkes (freestyle)	Swimming	Men's 3x50 m Medley Relay open
Gold	Piet Makkes	Swimming	Men's 50 m Backstroke special class
Gold	Piet Makkes	Swimming	Men's 50 m Freestyle special class
Gold	Aria Noordam	Swimming	Women's 25 m Backstroke class 1 complete
Gold	Janneke Minholtz (backstroke); Wil Verschoor (Breaststroke); Ingrid van der Benden (freestyle)	Swimming	Women's 3x50 m Medley Relay open
Gold	Wil Verschoor	Swimming	Women's 50 m Backstroke class 4 incomplete
Gold	Janneke Minholtz	Swimming	Women's 50 m Backstroke special class
Gold	Ingrid van der Benden	Swimming	Women's 50 m Breaststroke special class
Gold	Ingrid van der Benden	Swimming	Women's 50 m Freestyle special class
Gold	Dennis Post	Table tennis	Men's Singles A1
Gold	Aria Noordam	Table tennis	Women's Singles A1
Silver	Popke Popkema	Archery	Men's Albion Round open
Silver	Ingrid van der Benden	Swimming	Women's 50 m Backstroke special class
Silver	Sonja Graveland	Swimming	Women's 50 m Breaststroke class 3 incomplete
Silver	Dennis Post; Aria Noordam	Table tennis	Men's Doubles A1
Bronze	John van der Starre	Swimming	Men's 50 m Freestyle special class
Bronze	Jenneke van Driel	Swimming	Women's 25 m Breaststroke class 2 incomplete
Bronze	Janneke Minholtz	Swimming	Women's 50 m Breaststroke special class
Bronze	Wil Verschoor	Swimming	Women's 50 m Freestyle class 4 incomplete

Source: www.paralympic.org & www.olympischstadion.nl

== See also ==
- Netherlands at the Paralympics
- Netherlands at the 1968 Summer Olympics
