= Ora Anlen =

Israeli paralympic champion (1944–2022)

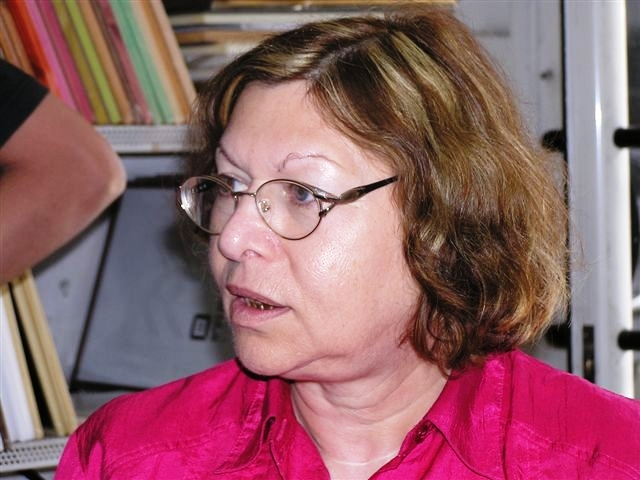

Personal information
- Native name: אורה אנלין
- Born: 15 August 1944
- Died: 10 July 2022 (aged 77)

Sport
- Country: Israel
Medal record
Representing Israel
Summer Paralympic Games
Swimming
Gold medal – first place	1968 Tel Aviv	100m breaststroke open
Silver medal – second place	1968 Tel Aviv	3X50m medley relay
Silver medal – second place	1972 Heidelberg	50m breaststroke 4
Silver medal – second place	1976 Toronto	50m breaststroke 4
Bronze medal – third place	1968 Tel Aviv	50m breaststroke 4
Athletics
Gold medal – first place	1972 Heidelberg	shot put 4
Gold medal – first place	1976 Toronto	discus throw 4
Gold medal – first place	1976 Toronto	shot put 4
Silver medal – second place	1972 Heidelberg	discus throw 4
Silver medal – second place	1972 Heidelberg	pentathlon 4
Silver medal – second place	1976 Toronto	pentathlon 4
Bronze medal – third place	1968 Tel Aviv	shot put C
Bronze medal – third place	1968 Tel Aviv	60m wheelchair B
Wheelchair basketball
Bronze medal – third place	1972 Heidelberg	wheelchair basketball

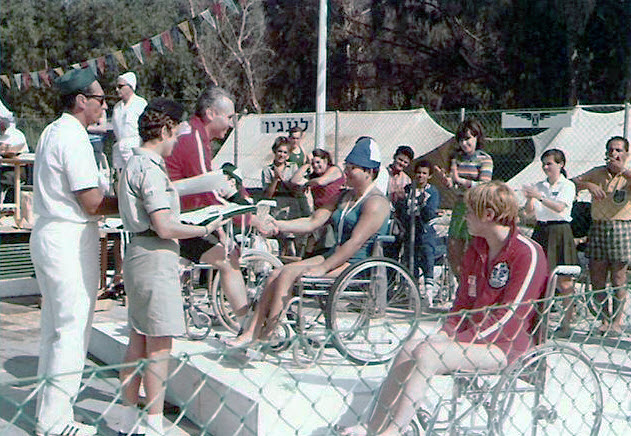
Receiving Gold Medal in the 1968 Summer Paralympics

Ora Anlen (née Goldstein; Hebrew: אורה אנלין; 15 August 1944 – July 10, 2022) was an Israeli Paralympic champion.

Anlen was born in Kibbutz HaMa'apil. As a young baby she contracted polio and remained paralyzed in both lower limbs. In 1964 she began practicing sports at the Israel Sports Center for the Disabled and was active in swimming, athletics and wheelchair basketball.

In 1966 she participated for the first time in an international competition. She won 5 medals in the Stoke Mandeville Games that year, and in 1968 won 5 medals and gained a world record during the 1968 Summer Paralympics. Anlen continued to excel, winning seven medals in the 1971 Stoke Mandeville Games, 5 medals in the 1972 Summer Paralympics, and 4 medals in the 1976 Summer Paralympics. Over the years she won 14 Paralympic medals and held three world records.

Anlen was married since 1977 to Haim Anlen, a delegate to the 1976 Summer Paralympics.

== See also ==
- Israel at the Paralympics
