= Spain at the 1968 Summer Paralympics =

- IPC code: ESP
- NPC: Spanish Paralympic Committee
- Website: www.paralimpicos.es (in Spanish)

in Tel Aviv
- Medals Ranked 21st: Gold 0 Silver 3 Bronze 1 Total 4

Summer Paralympics appearances (overview)
- 1968; 1972; 1976; 1980; 1984; 1988; 1992; 1996; 2000; 2004; 2008; 2012; 2016; 2020; 2024

Spain was one of twenty-eight nations that competed at the 1968 Summer Paralympics in Tel Aviv, Israel from November 4 to 13, 1968. The team finished twenty-first in the medal table and won four medals: three silver and one bronze, all in swimming events. The Spanish team contained eleven athletes; nine men and two women. (Note: Data is taken from the International Paralympic Committee website and is based on information contained/sourced in the original hardcopy final results publications. Some information from earlier Paralympic Games (i.e. 1960 – 1984) is incomplete and is missing first names of some athletes)

== Archery ==
Three Spanish men competed in archery, none won a medal in the sport. The best result was achieved by Bellon in the St. Nicholas round event for paraplegics.

== Athletics ==
Spain entered four men into athletics events; no medals were won. The best placed Spanish athlete was Llorens in the men's precision javelin; he finished the qualification round in eleventh position but did not advance to the final round.

== Dartchery ==
The only dartchery event at the Games was the mixed pairs event which took a knockout format. The Spanish pair of Llorens and Lorente defeated a team from Ireland in the first round but was eliminated by British pair Robertson and Todd in the second round.

== Swimming ==
Four Spanish swimmers competed at the Games, two men and two women. All of Spain's medals were won in swimming events. Riu won silver medals in both the women's 50 m freestyle class 3 complete and 50 m breaststroke class 3 complete, finishing behind Forder of Great Britain in both events. In men's events Carol won a bronze medal in the 100 m breaststroke open and a silver in the 50 m breaststroke special class.

== Table tennis ==
Two athletes played table tennis for Spain at the Games. Bellon entered the men's singles B event for Spain and also teamed up with Llorens in the men's doubles C event but failed to advance beyond the second round in either.

== See also ==
- Spain at the 1968 Summer Olympics
