= New Zealand at the 1968 Summer Paralympics =

- IPC code: NZL
- NPC: Paralympics New Zealand
- Website: paralympics.org.nz

in Tel Aviv
- Medals Ranked 18th: Gold 1 Silver 2 Bronze 1 Total 4

Summer Paralympics appearances (overview)
- 1968; 1972; 1976; 1980; 1984; 1988; 1992; 1996; 2000; 2004; 2008; 2012; 2016; 2020; 2024

New Zealand competed at the 1968 Summer Paralympics in Tel Aviv, Israel. It was the nation's first delegation to the Paralympics. The team finished eighteenth in the medal table and won a total of 4 medals; 1 gold, 2 silver and 1 bronze.

== Medallists ==
Medal	Name	Sport	Event
Gold	Eve Rimmer	Athletics	Women's Javelin C
Silver	Eve Rimmer	Athletics	Women's Shot Put C
Silver	Eve Rimmer	Swimming	Women's 50 m Freestyle class 4 complete
Bronze	Eve Rimmer	Athletics	Women's Discus C

== See also ==
- New Zealand at the 1968 Summer Olympics
