= Caz Walton =

British Paralympic athlete

Carol Walton OBE
Personal information
- Born: Carol Bryant; 1 February 1947 (age 79)

Sport
- Country: United Kingdom
- Sport: Paralympic athletics Para table tennis Paralympic swimming Wheelchair fencing Wheelchair basketball
- Retired: 1994
Medal record
Paralympic Games
Athletics
Gold medal – first place	1964 Tokyo	Women's Slalom open
Gold medal – first place	1964 Tokyo	Women's Wheelchair Dash below T10
Gold medal – first place	1968 Tel Aviv	Women's 60 m Wheelchair C
Gold medal – first place	1968 Tel Aviv	Women's Slalom C
Gold medal – first place	1972 Heidelberg	Women's 4x40 m Wheelchair Relay open
Gold medal – first place	1972 Heidelberg	Women's 60 m Wheelchair 4
Bronze medal – third place	1968 Tel Aviv	Women's Pentathlon incomplete (see text)
Bronze medal – third place	1972 Heidelberg	Women's Pentathlon 4
Bronze medal – third place	1976 Toronto	Women's 60 m 4
Table tennis
Gold medal – first place	1968 Tel Aviv	Women's Doubles C
Gold medal – first place	1972 Heidelberg	Women's Singles 4
Silver medal – second place	1968 Tel Aviv	Women's Singles C
Swimming
Silver medal – second place	1968 Tel Aviv	Women's 100 m Breaststroke open
Bronze medal – third place	1976 Toronto	Women's Singles 4–5
Fencing
Gold medal – first place	1988 Seoul	Women's Epee Individual 4–6
Gold medal – first place	1972 Heidelberg	Women's Foil Novice Individual
Bronze medal – third place	1976 Toronto	Women's Foil Individual 4–5

Caz Walton OBE (born Carol Bryant; 1 February 1947) is a British retired wheelchair athlete and former Great Britain Paralympic team manager. She was a multi-disciplinary gold medallist who competed in numerous Paralympic Games. Between 1964 and 1976 she won medals in athletics, swimming, table tennis, and fencing. She took a break from the Paralympics, entering the basketball and fencing competitions in 1988. In total Walton won ten gold medals during her Paralympic career, making her one of the most successful British athletes of all time. Walton should also have been awarded gold in the 1968 Tel Aviv Women's Pentathlon incomplete but, due to a miscalculation of her total score which went unnoticed at the time, she was given third place and a bronze medal.

== Sporting career ==
Walton enjoyed a lengthy competitive career, winning medals in European, Commonwealth, and World Championships. She competed in a wide range of events, including athletics, table tennis, swimming, fencing, and basketball.

=== Paralympics ===
Walton began her Paralympic career at the 1964 Summer Paralympics in Tokyo. She took part in two athletics events, the slalom and the wheelchair dash, winning gold in both. At the 1968 Games in Tel Aviv Walton competed in numerous track and field disciplines, the breaststroke and backstroke in swimming, and singles and doubles in table tennis. She won at least a silver medal in all three areas, finishing the Games with six medals three of which were gold.

Walton's most successful Paralympics was the 1972 Games in Heidelberg. She won two gold and one bronze medal in the athletics events and gold in the table tennis singles. She entered the fencing event rather than the swimming, winning the novice foil individual event. At the 1976 Games in Toronto Watson entered similar events, winning bronze in athletics, table tennis, and fencing.

For the 1988 Summer Paralympics in Seoul, Walton opted to compete in the wheelchair basketball and fencing events. Great Britain did not progress beyond the preliminaries of the basketball having lost all four matches, but Watson achieved what would be her final medal when she won gold in the épée individual 4–6. This took her total to ten Paralympic gold medals.

Walton retired from international competitions in 1994. She became the manager of Great Britain's Paralympic fencing team in 1996, reprising the role for the Games of 2000 and 2008. For the 2004 Games she was the team administrator for Great Britain.

== Awards and accolades ==
In 1970 Walton received the Bill McGowran Trophy for Disabled Sports Personality of the Year from the Sports Journalists' Association. She was appointed an Officer of the Order of the British Empire (OBE) in the 2010 Birthday Honours for her services to disability sport.
