= Great Britain at the 1968 Summer Paralympics =

- Flag of the United Kingdom
- IPC code: GBR
- NPC: British Paralympic Association
- Website: www.paralympics.org.uk

in Tel Aviv
- Competitors: 75 in 10 sports
- Medals Ranked 2nd: Gold 29 Silver 20 Bronze 20 Total 69

Summer Paralympics appearances (overview)
- 1960; 1964; 1968; 1972; 1976; 1980; 1984; 1988; 1992; 1996; 2000; 2004; 2008; 2012; 2016; 2020; 2024

Great Britain was one of twenty-eight nations to send athletes to the 1968 Summer Paralympics in Tel Aviv, Israel, held from November 4 to 13, 1968. The team finished second in the medal table and won sixty-nine medals: twenty-nine gold, twenty silver, and twenty bronze. Athletes from the whole United Kingdom, including Northern Ireland, were able to compete for the team. Seventy-five British athletes took part in the Games; fifty-one men and twenty-four women.

== Disability classifications ==
The Paralympics groups athletes' disabilities into one of five disability categories; amputation, the condition may be congenital or sustained through injury or illness; cerebral palsy; wheelchair athletes, there is often overlap between this and other categories; visual impairment, including blindness; Les autres, any physical disability that does not fall strictly under one of the other categories, for example dwarfism or multiple sclerosis. Each Paralympic sport then has its own classifications, dependent on the specific physical demands of competition. Events are given a code, made of numbers and letters, describing the type of event and classification of the athletes competing.

== Medalists ==
Medal	Name	Sport	Event
Gold	Derek Nicholson	Archery	Men's St. Nicholas round cervical
Gold	Ruth Brooks	Archery	Women's St. Nicholas round cervical
Gold	Valerie Forder	Athletics	Women's 60m wheelchair B
Gold	Carol Bryant	Athletics	Women's 60m wheelchair C
Gold	Carol Bryant	Athletics	Women's slalom C
Gold	Valerie Forder	Athletics	Women's pentathlon complete
Gold	Margaret Gibbs	Athletics	Women's pentathlon incomplete
Gold	William Easton; George Monoghan	Lawn bowls	Men's pairs
Gold	Gwen Buck; Janet Laughton	Lawn bowls	Women's pairs
Gold	Gwen Buck	Lawn bowls	Women's singles
Gold	Michael Shelton	Snooker	Men's open
Gold	John Britton	Swimming	Men's 25m freestyle class 2 incomplete
Gold	David Ellis	Swimming	Men's 25m backstroke class 2 complete
Gold	David Ellis	Swimming	Men's 25m breaststroke class 2 complete
Gold	W. Thornton	Swimming	Men's 50m breaststroke class 3 complete
Gold	Valerie Forder	Swimming	Women's 50m freestyle class 3 complete
Gold	Davina Ingrams	Swimming	Women's 25m backstroke class 1 incomplete
Gold	Gwen Buck	Swimming	Women's 25m backstroke class 2 incomplete
Gold	Valerie Forder	Swimming	Women's 25m backstroke class 3 complete
Gold	Karen Hill	Swimming	Women's 50m backstroke class 3 incomplete
Gold	Bellamy	Swimming	Women's 50m backstroke class 5 (cauda equina)
Gold	Valerie Forder	Swimming	Women's 50m breaststroke class 3 complete
Gold	Bellamy	Swimming	Women's 50m breaststroke class 5 (cauda equina)
Gold	Margaret Gibbs	Swimming	Women's 3x25m individual medley open
Gold	Paul Lyall	Table tennis	Men's singles B
Gold	Stephen Bradshaw; Tommy Taylor	Table tennis	Men's doubles A2
Gold	Barnard; Carol Bryant	Table tennis	Women's doubles C
Gold	T. Palmer	Weightlifting	Men's middleweight
Gold	Shelagh Finnegan; Valerie Forder; Sally Haynes	Wheelchair fencing	Women's foil team
Silver	Tony Potter; John Robertson; Dennis Slough	Archery	Men's albion round team open
Silver	Tony Potter; John Robertson; Dennis Slough	Archery	Men's FITA round team open
Silver	Russ Scott	Athletics	Men's javelin throw D
Silver	Clark	Athletics	Men's pentathlon incomplete
Silver	Janet Swann	Athletics	Women's novices 60m wheelchair dash B
Silver	Maggie Marr	Athletics	Women's club throw A
Silver	Maggie Marr	Athletics	Women's discus throw A
Silver	John Britton	Lawn bowls	Men's singles
Silver	David Ellis	Swimming	Men's 25m freestyle class 2 complete
Silver	W. Thornton	Swimming	Men's 50m freestyle class 3 complete
Silver	John Watts	Swimming	Men's 100m freestyle open
Silver	A. West	Swimming	Men's 25m backstroke class 1 complete
Silver	Brian Dickinson	Swimming	Men's 50m backstroke class 4 complete
Silver	John Britton	Swimming	Men's 25m breaststroke class 2 incomplete
Silver	Carol Bryant	Swimming	Women's 100m breaststroke open
Silver	Paul Lyall; George Monoghan	Table tennis	Men's doubles B
Silver	Carol Bryant	Table tennis	Women's singles C
Silver	Ruth Brooks; Levers	Table tennis	Women's doubles A2
Silver	Gwen Buck; Susan Masham	Table tennis	Women's doubles B
Silver	R. Rowe	Weightlifting	Men's heavyweight
Bronze	Stephen Bradshaw	Archery	Men's St. Nicholas round cervical
Bronze	Dick Thompson	Athletics	Men's 100m wheelchair A
Bronze	Dick Thompson	Athletics	Men's javelin throw A
Bronze	Tommy Taylor	Athletics	Men's pentathlon incomplete
Bronze	Carol Bryant	Athletics	Women's pentathlon incomplete
Bronze	A. West	Swimming	Men's 25m freestyle class 1 complete
Bronze	John Britton	Swimming	Men's 25m backstroke class 2 incomplete
Bronze	W. Thornton	Swimming	Men's 50m backstroke class 3 complete
Bronze	Gerry Kinsella	Swimming	Men's 50m backstroke class 4 incomplete
Bronze	Bellamy	Swimming	Women's 50m freestyle class 5 cauda equina
Bronze	Margaret Gibbs	Swimming	Women's 100m freestyle open
Bronze	S. Jones	Swimming	Women's 25m backstroke class 2 complete
Bronze	Women's team	Swimming	Women's 3x50m medley relay open
Bronze	George Monoghan	Table tennis	Men's singles B
Bronze	Susan Masham	Table tennis	Women's singles B
Bronze	Shelagh Finnegan; Janet Swann	Table tennis	Women's doubles B
Bronze	Men's team	Wheelchair basketball	Men's tournament
Bronze	John Clark; Brian Dickinson; Terry Willett	Wheelchair fencing	Men's épée team
Bronze	John Clark; Joe Slattery; Cyril Thomas	Wheelchair fencing	Men's foil team
Bronze	Sally Haynes	Wheelchair fencing	Women's foil individual

=== Medals by sport ===
Medals by sport
Sport	Gold medal	Silver medal	Bronze medal	Total
Swimming	13	7	8	28
Athletics	5	5	4	14
Table tennis	3	4	3	10
Lawn bowls	3	1	0	4
Archery	2	2	1	5
Weightlifting	1	1	0	2
Wheelchair Fencing	1	0	3	4
Snooker	1	0	0	1
Wheelchair Basketball	0	0	1	1
Total	29	20	20	69

== Dartchery ==
The only dartchery event at the Games was the mixed pairs event which took a knockout format. Two British pairs entered the competition: Nicholson (Note: Data is taken from the International Paralympic Committee website and is based on information contained/sourced in the original hardcopy final results publications. Some information from earlier Paralympic Games (i.e. 1960–1984) is incomplete and is missing first names of some athletes) and Taylor beat a team from Jamaica in the first round but lost in the second round to the Swiss pair; Robertson and Todd reached the third round where they lost to Italians Francesco Deiana and Raimondo Longhi.

== Snooker ==
One snooker event was contested at the Games, the men's open event. Keaton was eliminated in the first round by Jimmy Gibson of Ireland. Michael Shelton had wins over Goll, of Austria, and Newton from Australia to earn a place in the final against Gibson. Shelton defeated Gibson to take gold and the Irishman won the silver medal.

== Swimming ==
Twenty-nine British swimmers competed at the Games winning twenty-eight medals: thirteen gold, seven silver and eight bronze. Forder won three gold medals in women's 50 m class 3 complete events, finishing first in the backstroke, breaststroke and freestyle. Six other swimmers won multiple medals for Great Britain; Bellamy won two gold medals and a bronze in the women's class 5 (cauda equina); Britton, a gold, silver and bronze in men's class 2 incomplete events; Ellis, two golds and a silver in men's class 2 complete; Gibbs who won gold in the women's 3×25 m individual medley open and bronze in the 100 m freestyle open; Thornton who took a gold, silver and bronze in men's class 3 complete events; and West who won backstroke silver and freestyle bronze for men's class 1 complete events. Ingrams won gold in the women's 25 m backstroke class 1 incomplete in a world record time; White and Rosaleen Gallagher of Ireland won the silver and bronze medals in the event.

== Table tennis ==
Twenty five British players entered table tennis events and won ten medals; three gold, 4 silver and four bronze. In the women's doubles C event Bryant and Barnard won the gold medal after beating pairs from the United States, Jamaica, Belgium and Australia.

== See also ==
- Great Britain at the 1968 Summer Olympics
