= Edward Owen (Paralympian) =

American Paralympic athlete (1946–2008)

Personal information
- Born: July 18, 1946
- Died: August 1, 2008 (aged 62)
Medal record
Representing United States
Paralympic Games
Men's para athletics
Gold medal – first place	1968 Tel Aviv	Club throw special class
Gold medal – first place	1968 Tel Aviv	Discus throw special class
Gold medal – first place	1968 Tel Aviv	Shot put special class
Gold medal – first place	1968 Tel Aviv	Pentathlon special class
Silver medal – second place	1972 Heidelberg	Pentathlon 5
Silver medal – second place	1976 Montreal	Discus throw 5
Bronze medal – third place	1968 Tel Aviv	Javelin throw special class
Men's para swimming
Gold medal – first place	1964 Tokyo	50 m freestyle supine incomplete class 4
Gold medal – first place	1964 Tokyo	50 m breaststroke incomplete class 4
Gold medal – first place	1964 Tokyo	Medley relay open
Gold medal – first place	1968 Tel Aviv	50 m breaststroke special class
Gold medal – first place	1968 Tel Aviv	100 m breaststroke open
Bronze medal – third place	1964 Tokyo	50 m freestyle prone incomplete class 4
Men's wheelchair basketball
Gold medal – first place	1988 Seoul	Team competition

Edward S. Owen (July 18, 1946 – August 1, 2008) was an American Paralympian. He participated in the seven Paralympic Games from 1964 to 1988, winning nine gold medals, two silver medals and two bronze medals.
