= South Africa at the 1968 Summer Paralympics =

- IPC code: RSA (SAF used at these Games)
- NPC: South African Sports Confederation and Olympic Committee
- Website: www.sascoc.co.za

in Tel Aviv
- Competitors: 8
- Medals Ranked 10th: Gold 9 Silver 10 Bronze 7 Total 26

Summer Paralympics appearances (overview)
- 1964; 1968; 1972; 1976; 1980–1988; 1992; 1996; 2000; 2004; 2008; 2012; 2016; 2020; 2024

South Africa was one of twenty-eight nations that sent athletes to compete at the 1968 Summer Paralympics in Tel Aviv, Israel from 4 to 13 November 1968. The team finished tenth in the medal table and won a total of twenty-six medals; nine gold, ten silver and seven bronze. Eight South African athletes competed at the Games; five men and three women.

At the time, South Africa was banned from the Olympic Games because of the policy of apartheid but was invited to the Paralympics.

== Archery ==
Three archers from South Africa appeared at the Games. Le Roux (Note: Data is taken from the International Paralympic Committee website and is based on information contained/sourced in the original hardcopy final results publications. Some information from earlier Paralympic Games (ie 1960 - 1984) is incomplete and is missing first names of some athletes) finished ninth out of ten athletes women's Columbia round open and J. Meyer finished fifteenth in the men's FITA round open event. Margaret Harriman, who had previously competed in the Paralympic Games for Rhodesia won two gold medals; one in the women's albion round and one in the women's FITA round open event. Mayer and Harriman also competed in athletics and dartchery.

== Athletics ==
Eight South Africans took part in athletics events and won sixteen medals. Daniel Erasmus won two gold medals and two silver medals in men's throwing events and Hattingh did the same in women's events. Germishuizen won a bronze in shot put and a silver in discus. Nel took bronze in the men's club throw B. Le Roux won two silver medals and J. Meyer a gold and two bronze medals.

== Dartchery ==
The only dartchery event at the Games was the mixed pairs event which took a knockout format. Meyer and Harriman entered for South Africa and defeated a team from New Zealand in the first round, but lost in the second round to the Great Britain pair.

== Lawn bowls ==
Daniel Erasmus won the gold medal in the men's singles and teamed up with Germishuizen to win another silver in the men's pairs.

== Swimming ==
In men's class 2 incomplete events Nel won three medals; gold in backstroke, silver in freestyle and bronze in breaststroke. Lewis won silver in freestyle and bronze in breaststroke for men's class 4 complete classification.

== Table tennis ==
Hattingh and Le Roux competed in women's singles events; Hattingh won a bronze medal in the A2 classification. Nel took part in the men's A2 and beat American's Sheridan and Duval in the first two rounds before losing to Sharav of Israel.
