= Canada at the 1968 Summer Paralympics =

- Flag of Canada
- IPC code: CAN
- NPC: Canadian Paralympic Committee
- Website: www.paralympic.ca

in Tel Aviv
- Medals Ranked 12th: Gold 6 Silver 6 Bronze 7 Total 19

Summer Paralympics appearances (overview)
- 1968; 1972; 1976; 1980; 1984; 1988; 1992; 1996; 2000; 2004; 2008; 2012; 2016; 2020; 2024

Canada competed at the 1968 Summer Paralympics in Tel Aviv, Israel from November 4 to 13, 1968. The team finished twelfth in the medal table and won a total of nineteen medals; six gold, six silver and seven bronze. The Canadian team contained twenty-five athletes; eighteen men and seven women. (Note: Data is taken from the International Paralympic Committee website and is based on information contained/sourced in the original hardcopy final results publications. Some information from earlier Paralympic Games (ie 1960 - 1984) is incomplete and is missing first names of some athletes)

This was Canada's first appearance at a Paralympic Games.

== Medallists ==
Medal	Name	Sport	Event
Gold	Gord Patterson	Athletics	Men's novices 60m wheelchair dash A
Gold	Doug Wilson	Athletics	Men's novices 60m wheelchair dash B
Gold	Eugene Reimer	Athletics	Men's club throw B
Gold	Eugene Reimer	Athletics	Men's discus throw B
Gold	Hilda Mae Binns	Athletics	Women's novices 60m wheelchair dash B
Gold	Hilda Mae Binns	Swimming	Women's 25m freestyle class 2 incomplete
Silver	Walter Dann	Athletics	Men's novices 60m wheelchair dash C
Silver	Neault	Athletics	Men's club throw D
Silver	Eugene Reimer	Athletics	Men's javelin throw B
Silver	Hilda Mae Binns	Athletics	Women's slalom B
Silver	Karen McPherson	Swimming	Women's 50m backstroke class 3 incomplete
Silver	Miller	Swimming	Women's 50m backstroke class 4 complete
Bronze	Bourne	Athletics	Men's novices 60m wheelchair dash B
Bronze	Glendine Seeley	Athletics	Women's club throw C
Bronze	Glendine Seeley	Athletics	Women's javelin throw C
Bronze	Walter Schmid	Lawn bowls	Men's singles
Bronze	Gustav Schuster	Swimming	Men's 50m freestyle class 3 incomplete
Bronze	Karen McPherson	Swimming	Women's 50m breaststroke class 3 incomplete
Bronze	Karen McPherson	Swimming	Women's 100m breaststroke open

== See also ==
- Canada at the 1968 Summer Olympics
