= Austria at the 1968 Summer Paralympics =

- IPC code: AUT
- NPC: Austrian Paralympic Committee
- Website: www.oepc.at (in German)

in Tel Aviv
- Competitors: 31
- Medals Ranked 15th: Gold 2 Silver 7 Bronze 10 Total 19

Summer Paralympics appearances (overview)
- 1960; 1964; 1968; 1972; 1976; 1980; 1984; 1988; 1992; 1996; 2000; 2004; 2008; 2012; 2016; 2020; 2024

Austria competed at the 1968 Summer Paralympics in Tel Aviv, Israel from November 4 to 13, 1968. The team finished fifteenth in the medal table and won a total of nineteen medals; two gold, seven silver and ten bronze. Thirty-one Austrian athletes competed at the Games; nineteen men and twelve women.

== Athletics ==
Nineteen of Austria's competitors took part in athletics. Engelbert Rangger won a silver medal in the men's precision javelin with a score of 72. Hermina Kraft placed sixth in the women's event, with a score of 64.

== See also ==
- Austria at the 1968 Summer Olympics
