= West Germany at the 1968 Summer Paralympics =

- Flag of Germany
- IPC code: FRG (ALE used at these Games)
- NPC: National Paralympic Committee Germany
- Website: www.dbs-npc.de (in German)

in Tel Aviv
- Medals Ranked 6th: Gold 12 Silver 12 Bronze 11 Total 35

Summer Paralympics appearances (overview)
- 1960; 1964; 1968; 1972; 1976; 1980; 1984; 1988; 1992; 1996; 2000; 2004; 2008; 2012; 2016; 2020; 2024

Other related appearances
- East Germany (1984)

West Germany competed at the 1968 Summer Paralympics in Tel Aviv, Israel. The team finished sixth in the medal table and won a total of thirty-five medals; twelve gold, twelve silver and eleven bronze.

== See also ==
- West Germany at the 1968 Summer Olympics
