= Switzerland at the 1968 Summer Paralympics =

- IPC code: SUI
- NPC: Swiss Paralympic Committee
- Website: www.swissparalympic.ch

in Tel Aviv
- Competitors: 34
- Medals Ranked 22nd: Gold 0 Silver 2 Bronze 6 Total 8

Summer Paralympics appearances (overview)
- 1960; 1964; 1968; 1972; 1976; 1980; 1984; 1988; 1992; 1996; 2000; 2004; 2008; 2012; 2016; 2020; 2024

Switzerland competed at the 1968 Summer Paralympics in Tel Aviv, Israel from November 4 to 13, 1968. The team finished twenty-second in the medal table and won a total of eight medals; two silver and six bronze. Thirty-four Swiss athletes took part; thirty-two men and two women.

== See also ==
- Switzerland at the 1968 Summer Olympics
