= 1968 Summer Paralympics =

Multi-parasport event in Tel Aviv, Israel

III Paralympic Games
- Location: Tel Aviv, Israel
- Nations: 29
- Athletes: 750
- Events: 181 in 10 sports
- Opening: 4 November 1968
- Closing: 13 November 1968
- Opened by: Deputy Prime Minister Yigal Allon
- Stadium: Hebrew University Stadium

The 1968 Summer Paralympics (Hebrew: המשחקים הפאראלימפיים בקיץ 1968) were the third Paralympic Games to be held. Organised under the guidance of the International Stoke Mandeville Games Federation (ISMGF), they were known as the 17th International Stoke Mandeville Games at the time. The games were originally planned to be held alongside the 1968 Summer Olympics in Mexico City, but in 1966, the Mexican government decided against it due to difficulties. The Israeli government offered to host the games in Tel Aviv, a suggestion that was accepted.

The opening ceremony took place in the Hebrew University stadium at the Givat Ram campus in Jerusalem and the games took place in Ramat Gan, Tel Aviv District, at the Israel Sports Center for the Disabled. The closing ceremony took place in the Tel Aviv Trade Center. Therefore, these games were the first in Paralympic history to not be held concurrently with the Olympic Games.

== Sports ==
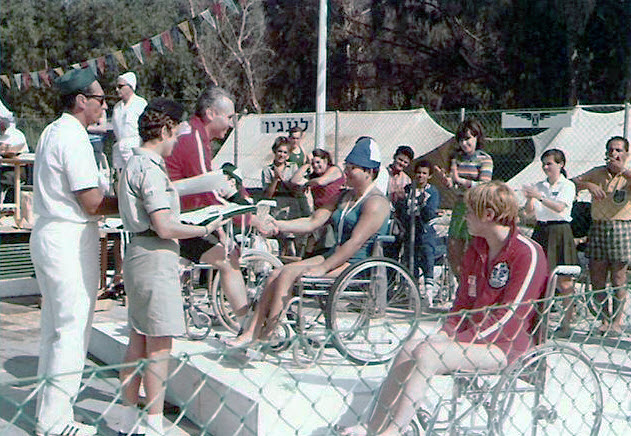
Ora Goldstein receiving Gold Medal

Lawn bowls was included in the program for the first time. In wheelchair basketball, a women's team event was added, as was a 100 m wheelchair race for men in athletics.

- Archery
- Dart archery
- Athletics
- Lawn bowls
- Snooker
- Swimming
- Table tennis
- Weightlifting
- Wheelchair basketball
- Wheelchair fencing

== Medal table ==
The top ten listed NOCs by number of gold medals are listed below. The host nation, Israel, is highlighted.

Rank	Nation	Gold	Silver	Bronze	Total
1	United States	33	27	39	99
2	Great Britain	29	20	20	69
3	Israel*	18	21	23	62
4	Australia	15	16	7	38
5	France	13	10	9	32
6	West Germany	12	12	11	35
7	Italy	12	10	17	39
8	Netherlands	12	4	4	20
9	Argentina	10	10	10	30
10	South Africa	9	10	7	26
Totals (10 entries)		163	140	147	450

== Participating delegations ==
Twenty-eight delegations took part in the Tel Aviv Paralympics. Canada, Denmark, Ethiopia, India, Jamaica, New Zealand, South Korea and Spain took part in the Summer Paralympics for the first time.

Having made its Paralympic Games début four years earlier, South Africa continued to compete at the Paralympics, by sending a delegation to the Tel Aviv Games. It was, at the time, banned from the Olympic Games due to its policy of apartheid, but it was not banned from the Paralympics until 1980 Summer Paralympics in Arnhem.

- Argentina (21)
- Australia (35)
- Austria (31)
- Belgium (26)
- Canada (25)
- Denmark (8)
- Ethiopia (2)
- Finland (2)
- France (54)
- Great Britain (74)
- India (10)
- Ireland (7)
- Israel (54)
- Italy (38)
- Jamaica (11)
- Japan (47)
- Malta (6)
- Netherlands (35)
- New Zealand (18)
- Norway (28)
- Rhodesia (14)
- South Africa (8)
- South Korea (5)
- Spain (11)
- Sweden (32)
- Switzerland (34)
- United States (82)
- West Germany (58)

Preceded by Tokyo	Summer Paralympics; Tel Aviv; III Paralympic Summer Games (1968)	Succeeded by Heidelberg
