= Australia at the 1968 Summer Paralympics =

- IPC code: AUS
- NPC: Australian Paralympic Committee
- Website: www.paralympic.org.au

in Tel Aviv
- Competitors: 32 in 10 sports
- Medals Ranked 4th: Gold 15 Silver 16 Bronze 7 Total 38

Summer Paralympics appearances (overview)
- 1960; 1964; 1968; 1972; 1976; 1980; 1984; 1988; 1992; 1996; 2000; 2004; 2008; 2012; 2016; 2020; 2024

Australia competed at the 1968 Summer Paralympics in Tel Aviv, Israel. The Games significantly expanded in 1968 when compared to previous years, as did the Australian team and the events included in the Games. Mexico City were originally to host the 1968 Paralympics, however, they were moved to Tel Aviv in Israel.

Although there was disappointment expressed at not being able to have to Paralympics in the 'Olympic' city of that year, the Tel Aviv organising committee worked hard to provide a positive experience for the athletes and their support staff. The Australian team however had to be content with dubious living conditions for the duration of the competition, being housed in an underground car park. Despite the poor accommodation the athletes performed well, with world records falling and numerous Australian competitors taking home a swag of gold medals (see 'Medalists' table below). Australia's haul of 38 medals earned them fourth spot on the 'unofficial' placing.

== Background ==
=== The Paralympic Games ===
Sir Ludwig Guttman was a German and Jewish neurologist who worked with the disabled in the national spinal injuries center called the Stoke Mandeville Hospital in England. Sport for the disabled was involved in the rehabilitation of spinal cord injury patients as it was believed to provide a physiological and psychological therapy. Guttman organised a competition with Archery and Javelin called the Stoke Mandeville Games that began on 28 July in 1948, the same day as the opening of the 1948 Olympic Games in London, with the hope it would one day become the Olympic Games for the disabled. This competition became international in 1952 when athletes from Holland participated and continued to grow. Sir Ludwig Guttman visited the Melville Rehabilitation Centre and invited Australian athletes to compete in the Stoke Mandeville Games in 1957. The 1960 Stoke Mandeville Games in Rome have been officially recognised by the International Olympic Committee as the first Summer Paralympic Games and Guttman went down in history as the man who connected rehabilitation to competitive sport and created the Paralympic Games.

=== 1968 Tel Aviv Paralympic Games ===
The 1968 Paralympic Games were held in Tel Aviv from 4 to 13 November, in and around the ILAN Sports Centre. The four other locations that were used were the Hayarkon Souts Club, Ramat Gan Stadium and the Ramat Gan Bowling Club. The logo of the 1968 Games represents three interlocking wheelchair wheels that were used by the Stoke Mandeville Games at the time and represent the ideals of the Games which are friendship, unity and sportsmanship. ISMG 1968 stands for International Stoke Mandeville Games 1968, which was the name of the Games before they were labelled the Paralympics. The length of the 1968 Paralympics was longer than that of the Paralympics prior in both Rome in 1960 and Tokyo in 1964.

The Paralympic games expanded in 1968 compared to previous years as the participating nations increased by seven to include Canada, Ethiopia, India, Jamaica, Korea, New Zealand and Spain in their first Paralympics in Tel Aviv. The Games saw an increase in sports with the addition of Lawn Bowls and an increase in the number of events from 144 to 188 with changes in classifications and Women's Basketball and the Men's 100m Sprint were added. The 1968 Paralympics saw a large increase in participation in that there were 378 in Tokyo and 750 athletes in Tel Aviv. The only type of disability included in Tel Aviv was spinal cord injuries, other disabilities were not added until 1976. At this time, the wheelchairs used by the Australian athletes were multipurpose and few had changes to them from the generic everyday wheelchair that increased stability or maneuverability to specialise them for sport. There were also restrictions in that athletes could not use straps to secure them to the wheelchair and rules were provided for cushion and wheelchair height to create and even playing field among the athletes. While the 1968 Paralympics in Tel Aviv were not as developed and professional as they are in the present day, Australian paraplegic athletes involved have largely discussed the high competitiveness of making the Australian team and the Tel Aviv Games themselves.

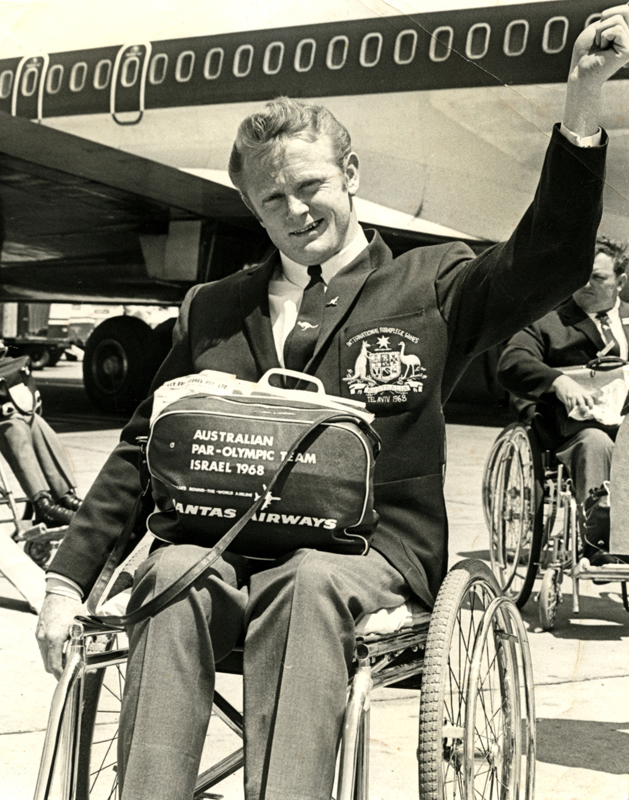
Jeff Simmonds on tarmac before departing for Tel Aviv 1968

=== Disabled Sport in Australia ===
Paraplegic sport in Australia was, like the United Kingdom, an aspect of rehabilitation from spinal injury for many patients, but the growing international status of sport for the disabled helped in the creation of initiatives in Australia. Interstate competitions began in Australia in 1959 and sporting organisations for disabled athletes were prevalent and still growing in each state. These organisations as well as Sir George Bedbrook, a surgeon and director of the spinal unit of the Royal Perth Hospital, and others played a vital role in the rise of organised, competitive disabled sport and the Paralympic movement in Australia.

=== Host City ===
A key component of the Paralympic Games is that it is always aimed to closely follow the Olympics and to be hosted by the same nation as the Olympic Games. However, there have been some exceptions to this due to various reasons and the 1968 Paralympic Games is one such exception. The competition was set to be held in Mexico City as the Olympic Games were that year and everything seemed to be progressing well until an American team led by Ben Lipton was to travel to Mexico City to assess the altitude impact on the disabled athletes as there were some concerns. Upon arranging their travel, the president of the rehabilitation center in Mexico sent a letter stating that due to financial constraints and accessibility issues with the facilities, Mexico city would not be able to host the Paralympic Games in 1968. This rejection of the Olympic host city was a blow to the agenda of Guttman as well as those involved in promoting sport internationally for the disabled but applications to be the host city were put forward by Buenos Aires, New York, and Tel Aviv. Guttman selected Tel Aviv, Israel as the host city and the President of the Israeli Stoke Mandeville Committee Arieh Fink, stated that the Israeli Government was most enthusiastic about being selected, given that it coincided with the twentieth anniversary of the State of Israel, as well as the twentieth anniversary of the Stoke Mandeville Games. Israel is a country with a long tradition of wheelchair sports due to their large number of spinal injuries from war, they had the resources to host a Paralympic Games and were, at the time, a powerful country of the International Olympic Committee.

== Cost and Funding ==
The cost to compete in the 1968 Paralympics in Tel Aviv was a challenge that all athletes faced in the Australian team, however, Israel paid for 50% of all teams travel costs which undoubtedly helped Australians to fund their trip. Some funding was also received from the Australian government to support these athletes. The athletes were responsible to raise the money required for the Games, their uniforms, equipment, travel, training and administration fees themselves and this was achieved through full-time work and a large amount of fundraising. Athletes fundraised through demonstration Games, donations, parties, street stalls, competitions, raffles, balls and anything they could do to raise funds to compete. When interviewed regarding the 1968 Paralympic Games, Australian athletes state that it was a necessity to work full-time to be able to afford to compete, but employment was not easy for all the athletes. Full-time work and fundraising meant that Australian athletes were not able to focus on and dedicate the same time to their training as much as some other countries athletes were able to.

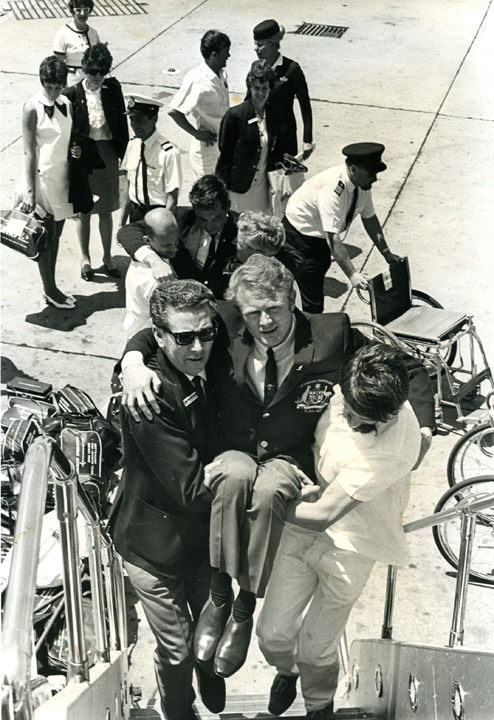
Jeff Simmonds Carried onto plane headed for Tel Aviv Paralympics 1968

== Accommodation and Travel ==
A highly prevalent concern of Australian athletes at the 1968 Paralympic Games was the accommodation and facilities that were provided in Israel. While the women athletes and other nations like America were in the rooms at the Kfar Maccabiah or Ramat-Aviv hotels, the male athletes on the Australia team were provided makeshift rooms in the carpark area beneath the high-rise building. The grounds were covered in plastic, athletes were provided camp stretchers with straw mattresses, that were replaced by the Australian team and staff with mattresses. There was one shower for all the men that was said to not have proper plumbing and very quickly overflowed and slightly flooded the area they were living in and one toilet. It is believed mosquitos were also present in the area in which the Australian team were living. The food provided was described by some of the Australian athletes as insufficient and unappetising, however, this may reflect cultural and cuisine differences and not the quality or nutritional content of the food. Multiple athletes on the Australian team, however not all athletes at the Games, have stated that these factors created some unpleasantness and reduced enjoyment of their experience at the 1968 Paralympic Games. The travel to and from the Games is not widely documented and as the image shows, the athletes were carried onto the planes in Australia heading to Israel and reports from the Daphne Hilton in the NLA interviews (NLA) state that a forklift was used to transport the passengers off the plane in Israel. During the Games, athletes travelled by bus to the venues and were almost always accompanied by Israeli female army officers.

== Opening ceremony ==
The opening ceremony for the 1968 Paralympic Games took place on 4 November 1968, in the University of Jerusalem Stadium. Approximately twenty thousand spectators were present at the ceremony, which included an introduction and lap of honour, known as the 'wheel past' of competing athletes, a military band performance, and folk dancing accompanied by a girls choir. Deputy Prime Minister of Israel Yigal Allon delivered the welcome message, as the President was recovering from illness at the time, and the founder and president of the Paralympic Games, Sir Ludwig Guttmann gave the opening speech. Giving the oath on behalf of the athletes was Israeli's Zvi Ben-Zvi, one of the pioneering Israeli Paralympians during the 1954 Stoke Mandeville Games, having becoming a paraplegic serving in the Arab-Israeli War.

== Team ==
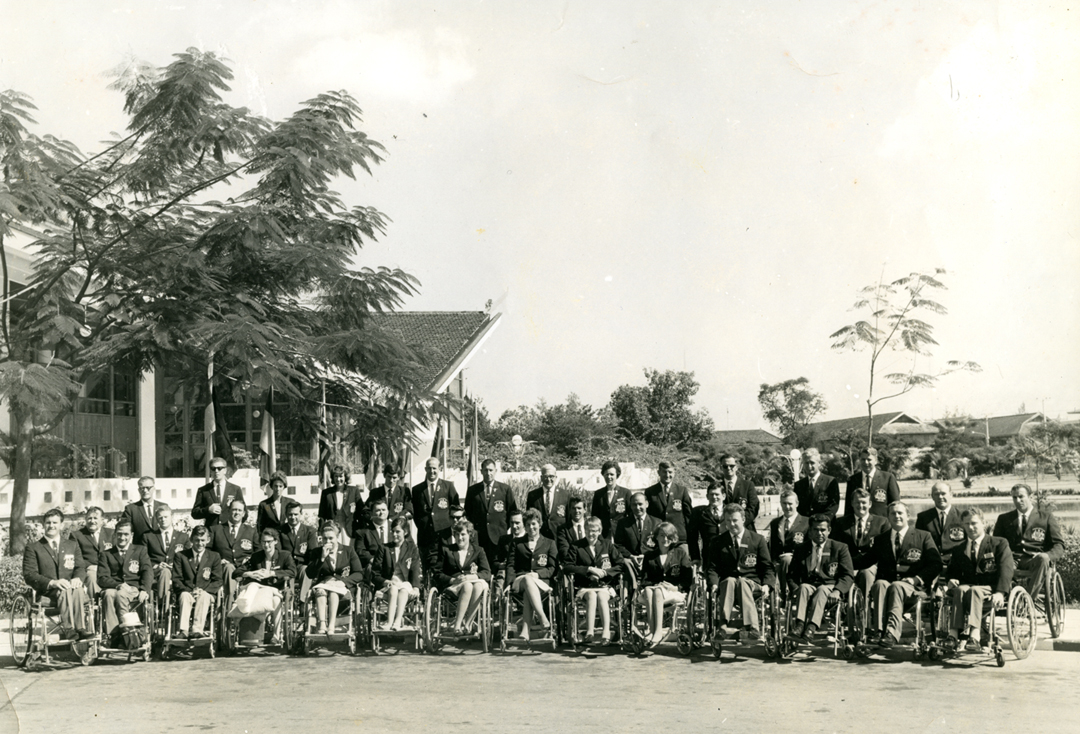
1968 Australian Paralympic Team in Bangkok on the way to Tel Aviv

The Australian team doubled in size from 16 in 1964 to 32 in 1968, it consisted of 32 members in total, 23 men and 9 women (results, Australia at paralympics, remembering and reflecting). :
Women – Pam Smith, Di Workman, Cherrie Ireland (née Loydstrom), Elaine Schreiber, Marion O'Brien, Daphne Hilton (née Ceeney), Elizabeth Edmondson, Lorraine Dodd, Sally Lamb
Men – Kevin Coombs, Kevin Cunningham, Bill Mather-Brown, Bruno Moretti, Frank Ponta, Gary Hooper, Vic Renalson, Kevin Munro, Roy Fowler, Kevin Bawden, Brian Chambers, Robert McIntyre, John Beattie, Peter Burt, Alan McLucas, Tony South, Alan Conn, Felix Blums, Jeff Simmonds, Don Watts, John Newton, John Martin, Noel Simmons

The athletes were supported by a large, dedicated support staff, a mixture of experienced practitioners and fresh faces (results, NLA:)
– Dr John Yeo (Team Leader), George Bedbrook(Senior Medical Officer), John 'Johnno' Johnston (Team Manager), Elizabeth Kosmala (née Richards)(Assistant Secretary), Mr Ashley Coops (Secretary), Mrs Aileen Coops (Attendant), Mr E. Kyle (Assistant Medical Officer), Miss D. Newton (Physiotherapist), Jan Hooper (Nurse), Kevin Betts (Attendant), M. Wilson (Attendant), William 'Bill' Gibbs (Sports Instructor), Jack McCafferty (Attendant), Miss Janet Tyler (nurse), Miss Nancy Joyce (nurse), Jan Hooper (Assistant Sports instructor, Baggage Marshall) and S.C. Chase (Assistant Baggage Marshall).

Kevin Coombs commented that the Australian team didn't have the sponsorship or training camps that other countries were providing their athletes. He noted that due to inadequate funding to be eligible athletes had to participate in several sports. Coombs also noted that the accommodation was very rough with the team being housed in an undercover car park, with one toilet and shower for 32 men and camp stretches with straw mattresses.

=== Selections ===
The competing athletes in the Games underwent selection by first being nominated to be eligible for selection by their state association and then being selected by coaches based on performance in the National Paraplegic Games held in 1968 before the Paralympic Games. This selection process was seen by some, as slightly flawed, yet other athletes had no issue with this process. Competitiveness to be selected to represent Australia at the Paralympic Games in 1968 was very high and athletes participated in numerous events because they were skillful enough but primarily to increase their chances of being selected. All of the athletes listed above competed and performed well enough in their events to be selected to represent Australia in the Paralympic Games in 1968.

== Events and results ==
There were 188 events from 10 sports included in the schedule of the 1968 Paralympic games in Tel Aviv and as a nation, Australia competed in 7 of these sports. Both the sports included and the number of events at the 1968 Paralympic Games increased from the previous Games from 144 to 188 events and from 9 to 10 sports adding Lawn Bowls as well as the Men's 100m Sprint for men and Women's Basketball events. Australian athletes were considered as quite successful, demonstrated as Australia claimed 4th place in the final medal tally. Details of events, Australian competitors and their results official results as reported by the International Paralympic Committee can be found below.

=== Archery ===
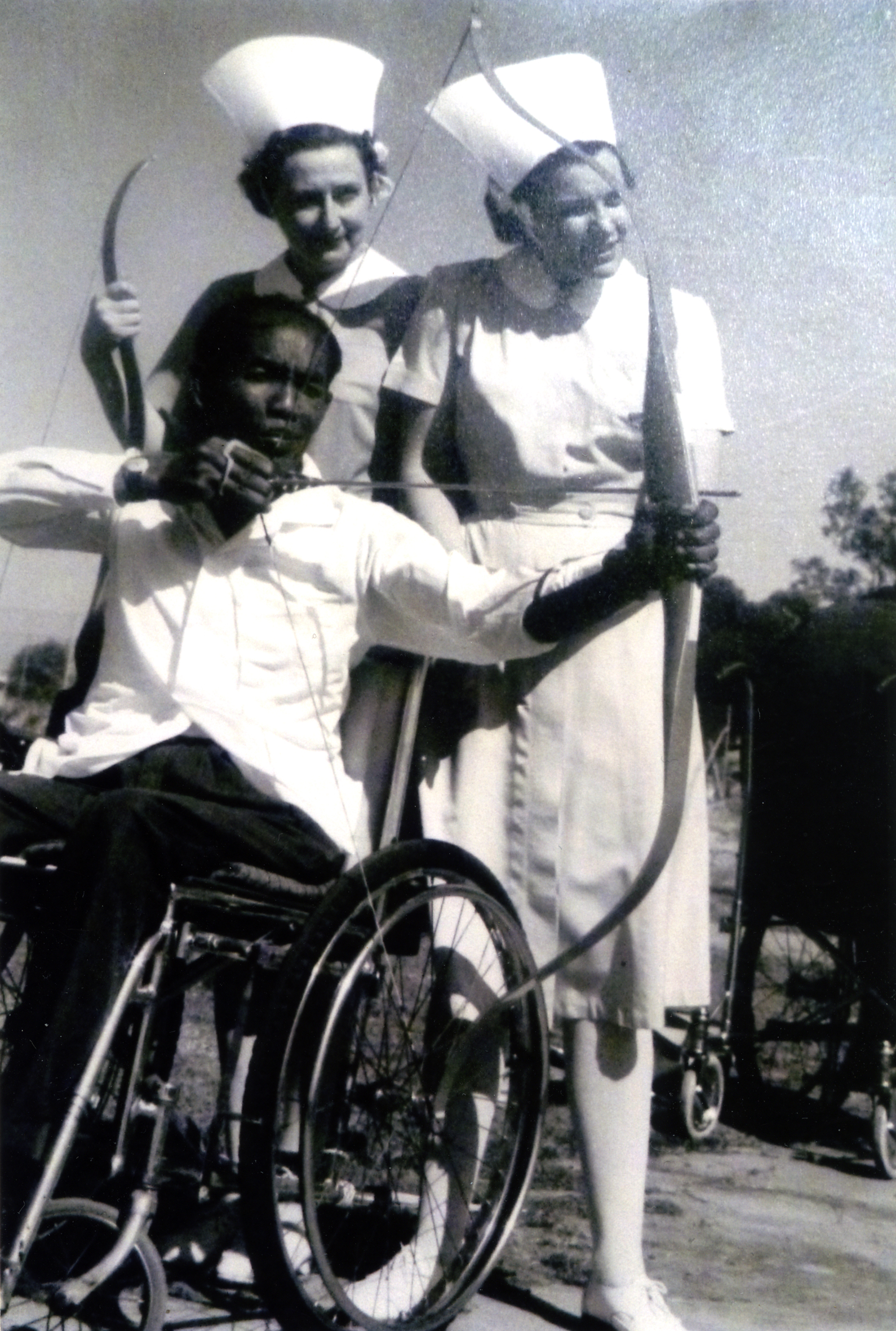
Archery 1968 Paralympic Games Tel Aviv

Australia represented by:

Men – Kevin Bawden, Felix Blums, Alan Conn, Roy Fowler, Alan McLucas, Tony South

Women – Pam Smith, Di Workman ^{[8]}

Archery was a strength of Australian athletes as three podium finishes were achieved in this sport, which saw a large number of athletes competing in these events. Tony South took the gold medal in the Men's Ablion Round Open event of his strongest sport by a mere 2 points to his Dutch opponent but was not able to beat him in the FITA Round Open and came in second. Whereas, Alan McLucas missed out of a gold medal in the Men's St. Nicholas Round Cervical by just 4 points winning the silver medal. Alan Conn finished with a gold medal in the Men's Columbia Round Open, setting a new world record in the process with a score of 618. While the women did not have as many competitors, both Workman and Smith placed in the middle of their event rankings.

Australian athlete results in archery
Gender	Event	Athlete	Place	Score/Time
Men	FITA Round Open	Tony South Fowler	2nd 13th	2029 1907
Men	Ablion Round Open	Tony South Fowler	1st 7th	800 714
Men	Columbia Round Open	Conn Bawden	1st 20th	618 536
Men	St. Nicholas Rounds Cervical	McLucas	2nd	523
Men	St. Nicholas Rounds Paraplegic	Blums	15th	624
Women	Columbia Round Open	Workman	7th	443
Women	St. Nicholas Round Paraplegic	Smith	6th	582

=== Athletics ===
Australia was represented by:

Men – Peter Burt, Brian Chambers, Kevin Coombs, Kevin Cunningham, Gary Hooper, John Martin, Bill Mather-Brown, Robert McIntyre, Alan McLucas, Bruno Moretti, Kevin Munro, Frank Ponta, Vic Renalson, Noel Simmons

Women – Lorraine Dodd, Daphne Hilton, Cherrie Loydstrom, Marion O'Brien, Elaine Schreiber, Pam Smith, Di Workman ^{[8]}

Athletics was Australia's most successful pursuit in Tel Aviv, finishing with a total of 19 medals made up of 7 gold, 7 silver, and 5 bronze. Australia had multiple competitors and took part in a large portion of the events that were available, as is seen in the table below.

Although Athletics wasn't her primary pursuit, Lorraine Dodd still managed to find herself on the medal podium twice, earning a silver medal in the Women's Slalom A event, and a bronze in the Women's 60m Wheelchair dash A. Dodd actually finished with the same time as the silver medallist in the 60m dash, but upon review was awarded the bronze.^{[9]} Gary Hooper competed in eight different track and field disciplines, earning a medal in three. There was a close battle between Australia's Gary Hooper and Bruno Moretti in the Men's 100m Wheelchair Dash. Hooper finished second to compatriot Bruno Moretti in the heats but Hooper came through to finish first in the final ahead of Moretti by 0.40 seconds and took home the gold medal.

The Men's 4x40m Open Relay team was made up of Gary Hooper, Martin, Moretti and Munro who won a silver medal, only being beaten by a world record time set by the United States (results). The Australians were faster in the final than in the heat but this was not enough to surpass the American team. The Women's 4x40m Open Relay team was Dodd, Hilton, Loydstrom and Shreiber were not as successful as the men and finished in 8th place just behind the French team.

Australia's men also saw some success in the slalom events, finishing one-two in the A and B events. Moretti and Mather-Brown topped their events comfortably in the A event and Martin narrowly beat Suga from Japan in the B event.

Australia had a large amount of competition in the field events, for example the Men's Shot Put C event saw 51 athletes compete, but Australia were still able to achieve a few podium finishes and come very close to those in front in of them other events. Renalson dominated the throwing events, improving on all of his qualification distances in the Men's Shot Put A, men's Discus A, men's Javelin A and Men's Club Throw A earning him two gold medals, one bronze and one silver. Australia had many competitors in the Precision Javelin event but were unable to finish the event with a medal. The Pentathlon event at the 1968 games was a mixture of Archery, Athletics and Swimming and Australia had five athletes compete in the men's and women's event overall. Frank Ponta did not place as well as he hoped in his favourite event finishing 7th in the Men's Pentathlon Complete event, but Daphne Hilton took the bronze medal in the Women's Pentathlon Special Class.

Australian athlete results in athletics
Gender	Event	Athlete	Score/Time	
Men	Novice 60m A	Heat – Simmons Final – Simmons	4th 4th	16.40s 16.30s
Men	Novice 60m B	Heat – McIntyre Heat – Burte Heat – Chambers	6th 9th 10th	15.40s 16.30s 16.30s
Men	100m A	Heat – Moretti Final- Moretti Heat – Hooper Final – Hooper Heat – Ponta Final – Ponta Heat – Mather-Brown	1st 2nd 2nd 1st 6th 6th 8th	24.00s 24.60s 24.20s 24.20s 26.10s 26.60s 26.40s
Men	100m B	Heat – Munro Final – Munro Heat – Martin Heat – Coombs	1st 1st 7th 11th	21.60s 21.80s 24.50s 25.90
Men	4x40m Open	Heat Final	2nd 2nd	40.60s 39.80s
Men	Slalom A	Moretti Mather-Brown Ponta Hooper	1st 2nd 6th 7th	1:07:20min 1:11:00min 1:21:40min 1:21:80min
Men	Slalom B	McIntyre Martin Munro	1st 2nd 20th	1:04:90min 1:06:90min 1:25:70min
Men	Slalom Cervical Class	McLucas	1st	1:29:20min
Men	Shot Put A	Q – Renalson Final – Renalson	2nd 3rd	6.31m 6.82m
Men	Shot Put B	Q – Hooper Final – Hooper	3rd 2nd	7.18m 7.33m
Men	Shot Put C	Q – Munro	38th	5.12m
Men	Shot Put D	Q – Simmons Q – Chambers	8th 19th	6.64m 4.81m
Men	Discus A	Q – Renalson Final – Renalson Q – Simmons	1st 1st 23rd	21.90m 22.34m 13.93m
Men	Discus B	Q – Hooper Q – Moretti	13th 17th	15.92m 13.76m
Men	Discus C	Q – Munro	29th	15.59m
Men	Discus D	Q – Simmons Q – Chambers	7th 17th	20.33m 15.73m
Men	Javelin A	Q – Renalson Final – Renalson	2nd 2nd	18.41m 19.48m
Men	Javelin B	Q – Hooper Final – Hooper Q – Moretti	5th 5th 12th	18.59m 19.30m 15.61m
Men	Javelin C	Q – Munro	30th	13.22m
Men	Javelin D	Q – Simmons Q – Chambers	7th 19th	19.43m 14.30m
Men	Club Throw A	Q – Renalson Final – Renalson	1st 1st	35.97m 39.02m
Men	Club Throw B	Q – Hooper Q – Moretti	8th 13th	32.96m 26.70m
Men	Club Throw C	Q – Munro	22nd	27.55m
Men	Club Throw D	Q – Simmons Q – Chambers	13th 23rd	32.47m 24.08m
Men	Precision Javelin Open	Q – Hooper Final – Hooper Q – Simmons Final – Simmons Q – Ponta Q – Coombs	2nd 5th 2nd 6th 24th 49th	72 62 72 60 64 60
Men	Pentathlon Complete	Ponta	7th	2016
Men	Pentathlon Incomplete	Chambers	9th	1962
Women	Novice 60m A	Heat – Dodd Final – Dodd	2nd 3rd	20.90s 20.70s
Women	Novice 60m C	Heat – O’Brien Heat – Workman	13th 17th	20.00s 22.10s
Women	Wheelchair 60m B	Heat – Schreiber Final – Schreiber	6th 5th	24.80s 21.40s
Women	Wheelchair 60m C	Heat – Hilton Final – Hilton	5th 3rd	18.60s 18.10s
Women	4x40m Open	Heat	8th	56.50s
Women	Slalom A	Dodd	2nd	1:31:70min
Women	Slalom C	O’Brien Workman Loydstrom	3rd 6th 20th	1:19:30min 1:21:60min 1:40:20min
Women	Shot Put A	Q – Dodd Final – Dodd	5th 5th	3.90m 3.90m
Women	Shot Put B	Schreiber	10th	3.68m
Women	Shot Put C	Q – Loydstrom Q – Smith	14th 21st	4.24m 3.73m
Women	Shot Put D	Q – O’Brien	12th	3.60m
Women	Discus A	Q – Dodd Final – Dodd	4th 5th	10.20m 10.23m
Women	Discus B	Q – Schreiber	12th	7.61m
Women	Discus C	Q – Loydstrom Final – Loydstrom Q – Workman	3rd 4th 22nd	14.26m 14.26m 8.69m
Women	Discus D	Q – O’Brien	10th	9.28m
Women	Javelin A	Q – Dodd Final – Dodd	4th 4th	8.67m 8.71m
Women	Javelin B	Q – Schreiber Final – Schreiber	6th 6th	9.46m 9.46m
Women	Javelin C	Q – Loydstrom Q – Smith Q – Workman	10th 20th 23rd	9.73m 8.17m 6.74m
Women	Javelin D	Q – Hilton Final – Hilton Q – O’brien	5th 5th 9th	10.40m 10.40m 9.74m
Women	Club Throw A	Q – Dodd Final – Dodd	6th 4th	17.28m 18.36m
Women	Club Throw B	Q – Schreiber Final – Schreiber	4th 5th	19.30m 19.30m
Women	Club Throw C	Q – Smith Q – Loydstrom Q – Workman	9th 10th 17th	20.05m 19.47m 16.85m
Women	Club Throw D	Q – Hilton Q – O’brien	7th 13th	19.65m 14.43m
Women	Precision Javelin Open	Q – Smith Final – Smith Q – Schreiber Final – Schreiber Q – Hilton Q – Dodd	2nd 5th 7th 4th 36th 43rd	72 66 70 70 58 50
Women	Pentathlon Complete	Dodd	4th	2185
Women	Pentathlon Incomplete	Loydstrom	5th	1873
Women	Pentathlon Special Class	Hilton	3rd	3192

=== Dartchery ===
Australia represented by:

Men – Kevin Bawden, Alan Conn, Roy Fowler, Tony South ^{[8]}

Australia's only competitors in the dartchery competed in the Mixed Pairs event, with Kevin Bawden and Roy Fowler being paired up, and the two gold medalists from the individual events, Tony South and Alan Conn, teaming up.

South and Conn made their way to the gold-medal match against the US team of Geissinger and Kelderhouse, with the Australian pair coming up short and taking home the silver medal. The Australian team of Bawden and Fowler made it to the round of 16 where they were overcome by the eventual gold medal-winning US pair.^{[9]}

Australian athlete results in datchery
Gender	Event	Team	Match	Score/Time
Mixed	Pairs Open	Conn/South vs India	1/16	Win
Mixed	Pairs Open	Conn/South vs USA	1/8	Win
Mixed	Pairs Open	Conn/South vs Belgium	Quarterfinal	Win
Mixed	Pairs Open	Conn/South vs Italy	Semifinal	Win
Mixed	Pairs Open	Conn/South vs USA	Final	Loss
Mixed	Pairs Open	Bawden/Fowler vs Sweden	1/16th	Win
Mixed	Pairs Open	Bawden/Fowler vs USA	1/8th	Loss

=== Lawn Bowls ===
Lawn bowls was a sport that was first included in the Paralympics in 1968. The events that took place were the Men's Singles, men's Pairs, women's Singles and Women's Pairs. According to official records of the games, there were no Australian athletes that competed in the Lawn Bowls competition in Tel Aviv.

=== Snooker ===
Australia represented by:

Men – John Beattie, John Newton^{[6]} ^{[8]}

John Newton finished with a bronze medal after losing his semifinal to eventual gold medallist, Great Britain's Michael Shelton.^{[9]}

Men's Tournament open was the only Snooker event at the Games. John Newton advanced to the semifinals after defeating Italy's Gambatesa but lost the semifinal to Michael Shelton from Great Britain, who went on to win the gold medal, to finish equal third with Ruschioni from Italy.

Australian athlete results in snooker
Gender	Event	Athlete	Place	Score/Time
Men	Tournament Open	AUS vs Italy	Quarterfinal	Win
Men	Tournament Open	AUS vs GBR	Semifinal	Loss

=== Swimming ===
Australia represented by:

Men – Felix Blums, Brian Chambers, Gary Hooper, Bill Mather-Brown, Alan McLucas, Frank Ponta, Jeff Simmonds, Don Watts

Women – Lorraine Dodd, Elizabeth Edmondson, Daphne Hilton, Sally Lamb, Cherrie Loydstrom ^{[8]}

Australia's females dominated the pool, with Lorraine Dodd and Elizabeth Edmondson setting five World Records between them at the Games. Dodd set three World Records on her way to three gold medals in the 25m Backstroke, Breaststroke, and Freestyle Class 2 Complete events. Edmondson's two gold medals also came in world-record time; one in the Freestyle 50m Class 4 Incomplete and the other in the Freestyle 100m Open event.^{[9]}

Daphne Hilton followed up her pair of bronze medals in Athletics with a silver medal in the Class 5 (cauda equina) 50m Freestyle event, demonstrating a lot of range with her athletic abilities.^{[9]}

Edmondson finished the Backstroke 50m C4 Incomplete event with a silver medal despite her final time being slower than her qualifying time. Chambers ranked first in his heat of the same event but was not fast enough to make the final. While America and Great Britain significantly surpassed every other nation in the Swimming medal tally, Australia took away 11 medals from the Swimming events alone, which demonstrated a very successful event for the Australian team at the 1968 Paralympic Games.

Australia athlete results in swimming
Gender	Event	Athlete	Place	Score/Time
	Freestyle 25m C2 Complete	Heat – McLucas in Overall	3rd 9th	51.00s
	Freestyle 25m C2 Incomplete	Heat – Mather-Brown Final – Mather-Brown	2nd 5th	27.00s 27.60s
	Freestyle 50m C3 Incomplete	Heat – Watts	4th	50.80s
	Freestyle 50m C4 Incomplete	Heat – Simmons Heat – Chambers Final – Chambers	4th 2nd 6th	44.70s 43.40s 41.90s
	Backstroke 25m C2 Complete	Heat – Ponta Final – Ponta Heat – McLucas	1st 3rd 4th	30.80s 30.90s 44.90s
	Backstroke 25m C2 Incomplete	Heat – Mather-Brown	3rd	38.20s
	Backstroke 50m C3 Complete	Heat – Simmons Final – Simmons	1st 4th	1:05:80min 1:07:80min
	Backstroke 50m C4 Complete	Heat – Blums	4th	1:49:70min
	Backstroke 50m C4 Incomplete	Heat – Chambers	1st	53.80s
	Breaststroke 25m C2 Complete	Heat – Ponta Final – Ponta	3rd 5th	35.50s 36.50s
	Breaststroke 25m C2 Incomplete	Heat – Mather-Brown	3rd	39.30s
	Breaststroke 50m C3 Complete	Heat – Simmons Final – Simmons	1st 2nd	1:02:20min 1:02:60min
	Breaststroke 50m C3 Incomplete	Heat – Watts Final – Watts Heat – Hooper	1st 2nd 6th	1:00:40min 59.50s 1:46:10min
	Breaststroke 50m C4 Incomplete	Heat – Chambers	4th	1:08:50min
	3x50m Medley Relay Open	AUS	9th	2:41:80min
Women	Freestyle 25m C2 Complete	Heat – Dodd Final – Dodd	1st 1st	27.20s 26.90s
Women	Freestyle 50m C4 Incomplete	Heat – Edmondson Final – Edmondson Heat – Loydstrom Final – Loydstrom	1st 1st 2nd 6th	44.00s 44.10s 1:01:40min 1:06:50min
Women	Freestyle 50m C5 Cauda Equina	Final – Hilton	2nd	46.50s
Women	Freestyle 100m Open	Final – Edmondson Final – Hilton	1st 5th	1:33:00min 1:48:50min
Women	Backstroke 25m C2 Complete	Heat – Dodd Final – Dodd	1st 1st	32.80s 32.00s
Women	Backstroke 25m C2 Incomplete	Heat – Lamb Final – Lamb	2nd 2nd	32.90s 32.00s
Women	Backstroke 50m C4 Incomplete	Heat – Edmondson Final – Edmondson Heat – Loydstrom	1st 2nd 4th	49.90s 52.30s 1:16:40min
Women	Backstroke 50m C5 Cauda Equina	Heat – Hilton DQ		
Women	Breaststroke 25m C2 Complete	Heat – Dodd Final – Dodd	1st 1st	33.00s 32.80s
Women	Breaststroke 25m C2 Incomplete	Heat – Lamb Final – Lamb	2nd 4th	38.60s 38.80s
Women	Breaststroke 50m C4 Incomplete	Heat – Loydstrom	4th	1:36:00min
Women	3x50m Medley Relay Open		5th	3:03:60min

=== Table tennis ===
Australia represented by:

Men – Kevin Bawden, Alan Conn, Kevin Coombs, John Martin, Bill Mather-Brown, Alan McLucas, Bruno Moretti, Jimmy Newton, Tony South, Don Watts

Women – Lorraine Dodd, Daphne Hilton, Cherrie Ireland, Marion O'Brien, Elaine Schreiber, Pam Smith ^{[8]}

Australia, had many athletes compete in Table Tennis in Tel Aviv, as did most nations that attended the Games. Both men's doubles teams were beaten and eliminated in the first round of the Men's Doubles B and C events but the Women's Doubles C team of Marion O'Brien and Elaine Schreiber won their way to the gold-medal match where they played Great Britain's pairing of Bryant and Carol Barnard, eventually going down and finishing in second place and the silver medal. The next highest ranking achieved by Australia was Martin, Kraft and O’brien all making the quarterfinal of their respective events. Great Britain, America and Germany all proved to be the most challenging teams for Australia as they topped the medal tally in Table Tennis along with the host nation, Israel.

Australian athlete results in table tennis
Gender	Event	Athlete	Match	Score/Time
	Singles A2	McLucas	1/8th	Win 1 – Loss 1
	Singles B	Moretti Newton Mather-Brown	1/16th 1/16th 1/32nd	Win 1 – Loss 1 Win 1 – Loss 1 Win 0 – Loss 1
	Singles C	Martin Watts Coombs	QF 1/32nd 1/32nd	Win 3 – Loss 1 Win 0 – Loss 1 Win 0 – Loss 1
	Doubles B	Conn/South Moretti/Newton	1/16th 1/16th	Win 0 – Loss 1 Win 0 – Loss 1
	Doubles C	Coomb/Mather-Brown Martin/Watts	1/16th 1/16th	Win 0 – Loss 1 Win 0 – Loss 1
	Singles B	Dodd	1/16th	Win 0 – Loss 1
	Singles C	Smith Hilton Kraft Loydstrom O’Brien	1/32nd 1/16th QF 1/32nd QF	Win 0 – Loss 1 Win 0 – Loss 1 Win 3 – Loss 1 Win 0 – Loss 1 Win 3 – Loss 1
	Doubles C	O’Brien/Schreiber Loydstrom/Smith	Final 1/8th	Win 4 – Loss 1 Win 1 – Loss 1

=== Weightlifting ===
Australia represented by:

Men – Gary Hooper, Vic Renalson ^{[8]}

The Weightlifting event had four different weight classifications but the only lift discipline was the Bench Press lift. Vic Renalson picked up his third gold medal of the Games in the Heavyweight lifting event, with a lift of 200 kg not being challenged by the other competitors.^{[9]} Hooper just missed out on receiving a medal in the Lightweight event, equaling the weight lifted by Jamaica but placing fourth.

Australian athlete results in weightlifting
Gender	Event	Athlete	Place	Weight
	Lightweight	Hooper	4th	110 kg
	Heavyweight	Renalson	1st	200 kg

=== Wheelchair basketball ===
Australia represented by:

Men – Kevin Bawden, Peter Burt, Brian Chambers, Kevin Cunningham, Kevin Coombs, Bill Mather-Brown, John Martin, Robert McIntyre, Bruno Moretti, Frank Ponta, Noel Simmons, Don Watts

Basketball at the 1968 Paralympic Games was played outdoors on a polished brick court late in the afternoon under lights. Basketball was an important event to the Australian male Basketball athletes but they did not place as well as they wanted, coming in 5th overall. In Pool D, Australia lost to both Italy and Argentina and as a result, Australia did not proceed to the medal rounds. A classification event was played, in which the Australian team won against both Germany and Sweden and were placed 5th overall.^{[8] [11]} The Basketball final in Tel Aviv was said to be the highlight of the 1968 Paralympic Games in which America played the home team of Israel. While Australia did not compete in this match, the team has described what an insight this was and that they took a lot from the game and the athletes in that final.

Event: Men and new women comp that we did not have a team for

Australian athlete results in wheelchair basketball
Gender	Event	Athlete	Place	Score/Time
Men	Wheelchair Basketball	AUS vs Italy	Loss	23–37
Men	Wheelchair Basketball	AUS vs Argentina	Loss	20–24
Men	Classification	AUS vs Germany	Win	37–22
Men	Classification	AUS vs Sweden	Win	43–22

=== Wheelchair fencing ===
Australia represented by:

Men – Kevin Bawden, Gary Hooper, John Martin, Jimmy Newton

Women – Daphne Hilton, Pam Smith, Di Workman ^{[8]}

Australia had multiple participants in the Wheelchair Fencing events in Tel Aviv, however, this was not their strongest event. Hooper was successful in all five matches in his pool in the Men's Foil Individual event but did not progress past the second round of games as he was defeated by France, Italy and Great Britain. Hilton was the only other athlete to progress into round two and she placed 5th in the Women's Foil Individual event.

Australian Athlete Results in Wheelchair Fencing
Gender	Event	Athlete	Place	Score/Time
Men	Épée Individual	Pool – Newton	5th	Win 2 – Lost 4
Men	Foil Individual	Pool – Newton Pool – Hooper 2nd Round – Hooper	6th 1st	Win 0 – Lost 5 Won 5 – Lost 0 Win 0 – Lost 5
Men	Novice Foil	Pool – Bawden Pool – Martin	4th 4th	Won 1 – Lost 3 Won 0 – Lost 3
Women	Foil Individual	Pool – Workman Pool – Hilton 2nd Round – Hilton	4th 3rd 5th	Won 2 – Lost 3 Won 2 – Lost 3 Won 2 – Lost 3
Women	Novice Foil	Pool – Smith	5th	Won 0 – Lost 4

== Medalists ==
While the 1968 Paralympic Games official medal tally was not incorporated in the games, after adding the final official results it was found that Australia ranked 4th in the nation with the most medals. Australia won 15 Gold, 16 Silver and 7 Bronze, and was behind the United States of America, Great Britain and Israel on the medal tally but nonetheless achieved a very successful result in the 1968 Paralympic Games in Tel Aviv. A full list of Australia's medal winners is depicted below.

Medal	Name	Sport	Event
Gold	Tony South	Archery	Men's Albion Round Open
Gold	Alan Conn	Archery	Men's Columbia Round Open
Gold	Gary Hooper	Athletics	Men's 100 m Wheelchair A
Gold	Kevin Munro	Athletics	Men's 100 m Wheelchair B
Gold	Vic Renalson	Athletics	Men's Club Throw A
Gold	Vic Renalson	Athletics	Men's Discus Throw A
Gold	Bruno Moretti	Athletics	Men's Slalom A
Gold	Robert McIntyre	Athletics	Men's Slalom B
Gold	Alan McLucas	Athletics	Men's Slalom Cervical Class
Gold	Lorraine Dodd	Swimming	Women's 25 m Freestyle Class 2 Complete
Gold	Lorraine Dodd	Swimming	Women's 25 m Backstroke Class 2 Complete
Gold	Lorraine Dodd	Swimming	Women's 25 m Breaststroke Class 2 Complete
Gold	Elizabeth Edmondson	Swimming	Women's 50 m Freestyle Class 4 Incomplete
Gold	Elizabeth Edmondson	Swimming	Women's 100 m Freestyle Open
Gold	Vic Renalson	Weightlifting	Men's Heavyweight
Silver	Tony South	Archery	Men's FITA Round Open
Silver	Tony South	Dartchery	Mixed Pairs Open
Silver	Alan McLucas	Archery	Men's St. Nicholas Round Cervical
Silver	Bruno Moretti	Athletics	Men's 100 m Wheelchair A
Silver	Gary Hooper, John Martin, Bruno Moretti, Kevin Munro	Athletics	Men's 4×40 m Relay Open
Silver	Vic Renalson	Athletics	Men's Javelin Throw A
Silver	Gary Hooper	Athletics	Men's Shot Put B
Silver	Bill Mather-Brown	Athletics	Men's Slalom A
Silver	John Martin	Athletics	Men's Slalom B
Silver	Lorraine Dodd	Athletics	Women's Slalom A
Silver	Jeff Simmonds	Swimming	Men's 50 m Breaststroke Class 3 Complete
Silver	Don Watts	Swimming	Men's 50 m Breaststroke Class 3 Incomplete
Silver	Daphne Hilton	Swimming	Women's 50 m Freestyle Class 5 (cauda equina)
Silver	Sally Lamb	Swimming	Women's 25 m Backstroke Class 2 Incomplete
Silver	Elizabeth Edmondson	Swimming	Women's 50 m Backstroke Class 4 Incomplete
Silver	Marion O'Brien, Elaine Schreiber	Table Tennis	Women's Doubles C
Bronze	Vic Renalson	Athletics	Men's Shot Put A
Bronze	Lorraine Dodd	Athletics	Women's Novices 60 m Wheelchair Dash A
Bronze	Daphne Hilton	Athletics	Women's 60 m Wheelchair C
Bronze	Daphne Hilton	Athletics	Women's Pentathlon Special Class
Bronze	Marion O'Brien	Athletics	Women's Slalom C
Bronze	John Newton	Snooker	Men's Open
Bronze	Frank Ponta	Swimming	Men's 25 m Backstroke Class 2 Complete

Medals by discipline
Discipline	Gold medal	Silver medal	Bronze medal	Total
Archery	2	2	0	4
Athletics	7	7	5	19
Dartchery	0	1	0	1
Snooker	0	0	1	1
Swimming	5	5	1	11
Table tennis	0	1	0	1
Weightlifting	1	0	0	1
Wheelchair basketball	0	0	0	0
Wheelchair fencing	0	0	0	0
Total	15	16	7	38

== Outstanding Performances ==
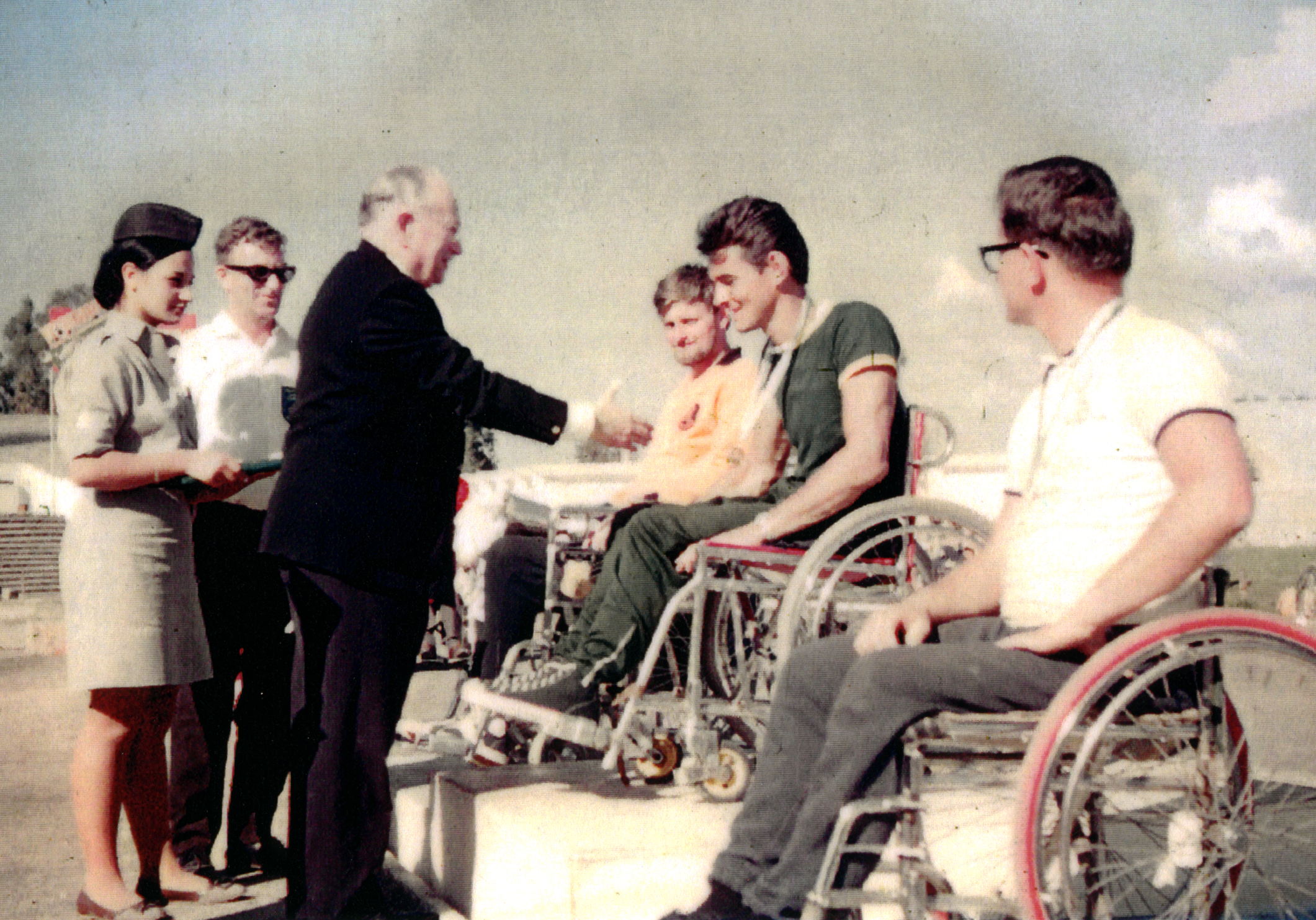
Tony South medal Tel Aviv 1968

Among the Australian athlete team, there were several standout athletes whose performances at the 1968 Paralympic Games are worth acknowledging. These are athletes who have set world records, won numerous medals and/or participated in a large number of events in Tel Aviv.

Tony South competed in 3 different sports, a total of 4 events and also won a gold medal in Men's Archery Albion Round Open and Silver in the Men's Archery FITA Round Open as well as Men's Dartchery Mixed Pairs Open. While he did not medal in Table Tennis, he won medals in all three of the four events he competed in.

Lorraine Dodd had one of the highest achieving performances of the Australian team at these Games. In swimming Dodd competed in, won the gold medal and set a new world record in the Women's Freestyle, Backstroke and Breaststroke 25m Class 2 Complete, all in the same day. Dodd also competed Table Tennis and in 9 Athletic events where she won a silver medal for Women's Slalom A and a bronze medal in the Women's Novice 60m Wheelchair Dash A. She not only participated in a large number of event but she performed well enough to win a total of 5 medals in the 1968 Paralympics, more than any Australian athlete at these games.

Daphne Hilton also competed in a large number of events in Tel Aviv which were five Athletics events, three Swimming events, one Table Tennis event and Fencing (results). Hilton won a silver medal in the Women's 50m Freestyle Class 5 (cauda equina) and a bronze medal in the Women's 60m Wheelchair C and Women's Pentathlon Special Class.

Gary Hoper competed in a total of 12 events in Tel Aviv, nine Athletics events, one Swimming, one Weightlifting and one Fencing even. Hooper completed the Games with a gold medal in Men's 100m Wheelchair A Sprint, Silver in the Men's 4x40m Relay Open (Athletics) and a silver medal in the Men's Shot Put B.

Bill Mather-Brown represented Australia in two Athletics events, three Swimming events, two Table Tennis events and in the Men's Basketball, competing in a total of 8 events. Mather-Brown was able to secure a silver medal in the Men's Slalom A event.

Bruno Moretti's won a gold medal for the Men's Slalom A, a silver medal in the Men's 100m Wheelchair A and a silver medal in the Men's 4x40m Relay Open (Athletics). Moretti also competed in three other Athletics events, two Table Tennis events and Men's Basketball.

Vic Renalson's results at the 1968 Paralympic Games were one of the most successful from Australia's team. Renalson won a gold medal in Men's club throw A, men's discuss A, heavyweight weightlifting, a silver medal in Men's javelin A and a bronze medal in Men's shot put A, winning a medal in every event he competed in.

Elizabeth Edmondson won a medal in all the events she competed in at the Games but she also set two world records in the events in which she won the gold medal for. Edmondson won the gold medal and broke the world record in the Women's 50m freestyle class 4 incomplete and the Women's 100m Freestyle Open. The third and only other event Edmondson participated in was the Women's 50m backstroke class 4 incomplete in which she won a silver medal.

The final standout athlete from the Games in the Australian team was Allan McLucas who competed in four different sports as well as won two medals. McLucas won a gold medal in the Men's slalom cervical event and a silver medal in the Men's Archery St. Nicholas round cervical event. While no podium finish was achieved, McLucas also competed in the Men's freestyle and backstroke 25m class 2 complete events at the 1968 Paralympic Games.

== Politics ==
The Paralympic Games were held Israel approximately one year after the Six Day War took place between Israel and Egypt, Syria and Jordan. Australian athletes were accompanied by female army staff throughout the duration of the Games. Armed army officers were present at the games and on the streets and many athletes recall seeing damaged tanks, cars and bullet holes during their time at the Games. The presence and abundance of these aspects could have been exaggerated or seen to stand out due to the Australia athletes potentially not have been exposed to anything like this prior, however, many athletes recall that these were present in Israel during the Games and left them with a feeling of slight apprehension at times.

After competition had finished, Daphne Hilton and other athletes attended a marketplace in Maccabi, Israel when gunfire broke out and the Army got involved. These recounts describe potential political unrest in Israel during the Paralympic Games in 1968. However, the details are not well documented and are simply the Australian teams interpretation of the situation. At a Paralympic dinner event in Israel that followed the games, Israeli personnel discussed how they do not want peace and not to fight. No threatening events or disruption or hostile events occurred during the Paralympic Games and remnants are not an indicator of the actual situation in Israel at the time.

An incidence of racial discrimination towards Australian team member Kevin Coombs was stated by Coobs and other athletes and support staff to have taken place stemming from a South African athlete in a bar at the Maccabi Village during the Games. Coombs and Billy Mather-Brown recall an athlete saying out loud to Coombs "What, are they opening a bar for niggers now?". This is potentially related to why South Africa were banned from participating in the Summer Olympic Games that same year. Although, this appeared to be an isolated incident and was resolved soon after as the athlete apologised.

There was a policy arranged by Israel with Britain to have Rhodesian athletes enter the country without their passports being checked to eliminate political issues associated with their participation in the Paralympic Games in Tel Aviv as their Olympic team were banned from the Olympics in Mexico in 1968 by Britain as a result of national racial and political issues that occurred at the time. There was also a policy in place in Israel at the time that required the German athletes and staff to complete a questionnaire regarding their political past and if and what category they had been denazified in, this was due to issues surrounding the Holocaust that occurred many years earlier. The official medal tally, raising of national flags and playing national anthems for medal presentations were completely removed from the games in an attempt to reduce the political competitiveness between nations as it was reportedly seen at the 1968 Summer Olympics. There were a number of political issues that were factored into the 1968 Paralympic Games in Tel Aviv and, like those experienced by Kevin Coombs, some did affect the Australian team.

== Closing ceremony ==
The closing ceremony took place at the Tel Aviv Fair Grounds on 13 November. Deputy Prime Minister Yigal Allon and the Mayor of Tel Aviv, Mordechai Namir, were both in attendance for the ceremony to see trophies presented to athletes, as well as a display by dancers from three local kibbutzim. Allon thanked participants for their involvement and contribution to world unity, and declared the Games closed.

== Post Games ==
Following the Games, the Australian team visited a Kibbutz near Lake Tiberias where they were provided with lunch and received a small bottle of holy water each on their return (stoke to mandeville, NLA). When travelling back to Australia, the team spent two days in Bangkok, followed by three days in Singapore. While in Singapore, the Australian team demonstrated sport to local paraplegics.^{[12]} In support of the Australian Athletes and the Games, Australia Post introduced stamps of both the Olympic and Paralympic Games for the first time in 1968 of the Mexico Olympics and the Paralympics in Tel Aviv.

=== Reunions ===
In June 2013, four South Australia members of the 1968 Australian Paralympics Team relived memories as part of the Australian Paralympic Committee history project. Archer Pam McLeod née Smith and wheelchair sprinter Kevin Munro were joined by Libby Kosmala and team nurse Janet Tyler. Kosmala who went on to compete in a record eleven Paralympic Games commented that: In those days athletes had to use their everyday chair to compete in, now they've got specialized chairs for all sports from sprinting to basketball to shooting. The 1968 Games were the first Games where South Australia athletes had been selected for Australia. `

== See also ==
- Australia at the 1968 Summer Olympics
