= Australian Paralympic Archery team =

Australia was represented in archery at the first 1960 Summer Paralympic Games. Three athletes - Ross Sutton, Tony South and Alan Conn have won gold medals. Australia has won medals at six Games.

== Medal tally ==
| Games | Gold | Silver | Bronze | Total |
|---|---|---|---|---|
| 1960 Rome | 1 | 1 | 0 | 2 |
| 1964 Tokyo | 0 | 2 | 1 | 3 |
| 1968 Tel-Aviv | 2 | 2 | 0 | 4 |
| 1972 Heidelberg | 0 | 1 | 1 | 2 |
| 1976 Toronto | 0 | 0 | 0 | 0 |
| 1980 Arnhem | 0 | 1 | 0 | 1 |
| 1984 Stoke Mandeville | 0 | 2 | 1 | 3 |
| 1988 Seoul | 0 | 0 | 0 | 0 |
| 1992 Barcelona | 0 | 0 | 0 | 0 |
| 1996 Atlanta | 0 | 0 | 0 | 0 |
| 2000 Sydney* | 0 | 0 | 0 | 0 |
| 2004 Athens | 0 | 0 | 0 | 0 |
| 2008 Beijing | 0 | 0 | 0 | 0 |
| 2012 London | 0 | 0 | 0 | 0 |
| 2016 Rio | 0 | 0 | 1 | 1 |
| 2020 Tokyo | 0 | 0 | 0 | 0 |
| 2024 Paris | 0 | 0 | 0 | 0 |
| Totals (17 entries) | 3 | 9 | 4 | 16 |

== Summer Paralympic Games ==
=== 1960 ===
Australia represented by:
Men - Frank Ponta, Ross Sutton, Robin Tourier
Women Daphne Ceeney (now Hilton)
Ross Sutton won a gold medal and Daphne Ceeney a silver medal.

=== 1964 ===
Australia represented by:
Men - Lionel Cousens, Roy Fowler, John Martin
Women - Daphne Ceeney
Roy Fowler won two silver medals and Lionel Cousens and John Martin won a silver medal.

=== 1968 ===
Australia represented by:
Men - Kevin Bawden, Fred Blums, Alan Conn, Roy Fowler, Allan McLucas, Tony South
Women - Pam Smith, Di Workman
Tony South won a gold and silver medal. Allan Conn won a gold medal. Allan McLucas won a silver medal.

=== 1972 ===
Australia represented by:
Men - Alan Conn, Dwyer, Roy Fowler, Eric Magennis, Terry Mason, Victor Salvemini, Tony South
Women - Margaret Ross, Pam Smith
Roy Fowler won a silver and bronze medal. Tony South and Alan Conn won bronze medals.

=== 1976 ===
Australia represented by:
Men – Wayne Flood, Roy Fowler, Jeff Heath, Ross Soutar
Women – Charmaine McLean, Elizabeth Richards, Margaret Ross
Australia did not win any medals.

=== 1980 ===
Australia represented by:
Men - Dennis Kennedy, Eric Klein, Ian Trewhella
Women – Susan Davies
Ian Trewhella won a silver medal.

=== 1984 ===
Australia represented by:
Men – Stephen Austen, David Higgins, Eric Klein, Russell Schinn, Ian Trewhella
Women – Susan Davies
Australia won two silver and one bronze medal. Ian Trewhella won two silver medals, Stephen Austen and David Higgins won silver medal and Susan Davies won a bronze.

=== 1988 ===
Australia represented by:
Men – Arthur Fisk, Eric Klein
Women – Carolyn Burns
Australia did not win any medals.

=== 1992 ===
Australia represented by:
Men – Arthur Fisk, Eric Klein
Australia did not win any medals.

=== 1996 ===
No athletes

=== 2000 ===
Australia represented in archery by:

Men - Arthur Fisk, John Marshall, Tony Marturano
Women - Natalie Cordowiner
Coaches - Robert de Bondt (Head), Hans Klar
Australia failed to win any medals.

=== 2004 ===
Australia represented in archery:

Women - Natalie Cordowiner
Officials - Vicki O'Brien (Manager) Australia's sole competitor did not win a medal.

=== 2008 ===
No athletes

=== 2012 ===
No athletes

=== 2016 ===
Australia represented in archery by:

Men – Jonathon Milne
Head Coach/ Team Leader - Ricci Cheah
Milne won Australia first archery medal since 1984 by winning the bronze medal in Compound Individual W2.
Detailed results - Australia at the 2016 Summer Paralympics

=== 2020 ===
Australia represented in archery by:

Men – Patrick French, Peter Marchant, Jonathon Milne
Women – Imalia Oktrininda
Officials Head Coach- Ricci Cheah, Team Leader - Graham Winston

Detailed results - Australia at the 2020 Summer Paralympics

=== 2024 ===
Australia represented in archery by:

Men – Patrick French, Taymon Kenton-Smith, Jonathon Milne
Women – AJ Jennings, Ameera Lee, Melissa Tanner
Officials Head Coach- Ricci Cheah, Position Coaches - Sarah Fuller, Alex King, Team Leader - Andrew Burns, Carer - Lee Louden

Detailed results - Australia at the 2024 Summer Paralympics

== See also ==
- Archery at the Summer Paralympics
- Australia at the Paralympics
