= Dartchery at the Summer Paralympics =

- Events: 3 (men: 1; women: 1; mixed: 1)

Games
- 1960; 1964; 1968; 1972; 1976; 1980; 1984; 1988; 1992; 1996; 2000; 2004; 2008; 2012; 2016; 2020; 2024
- Medalists

Dartchery (a combination of darts and archery which uses a dart board instead of a standard archery target) was contested at the Summer Paralympic Games from 1960 to 1980. Competitions were carried out in pairs: mixed pairs from 1960 to 1980, and men's pairs and women's pairs from 1972 to 1980.

Though the participants and results have, for the most part, been recorded by the International Paralympic Committee, the scores obtained by competitors have not.

== Results by Games ==
=== 1960 ===
Dartchery was one of the eight sports contested at the inaugural Paralympic Games in Rome in 1960. Only three pairs of athletes competed, and therefore all won a medal. Jack Whitman and Wayne Broeren of the United States defeated their compatriots Jim Mathis and John Tigyer, as well as French competitors Camille Trouverie and Bernabei, to win gold.

Mixed

Year	Gold	Silver	Bronze
1960	Jack Whitman & Wayne Broeren; United States (USA)	John Tigyer & Jim Mathis; United States (USA)	Camille Trouverie & Bernabei; France (FRA)

=== 1964 ===
Four pairs of athletes competed. All received medals, as two pairs were awarded bronze. France and Belgium both sent one competitor each to form a team.

Mixed

Year	Gold	Silver	Bronze
1964	George Mann & Margaret Harriman; Rhodesia (RHO)	Jim Mathis & George Pasipanki; United States (USA)	T. Matsumoto & T. Ando; Japan (JPN) and Pesnaud & Schelfaut; France (FRA) & Belgium (BEL)

=== 1968 ===
At the 1968 Games in Tel Aviv, the number of competitors in dartchery increased significantly, to thirty-one pairs (from eighteen countries). They were pitted against each other two by two in a round of sixteen, with French pair Ehrsam and Seguin receiving a bye in the first round.

In the round of sixteen, the results were as follows (winners in bold):

Geissinger and Kelderhouse (United States) def. Excell and Hall (Jamaica)
Roy Fowler and Kevin Bawden (Australia) def. A. Luks and Andersson (Sweden)
Giuliano Koten and Uber Sala (Italy) def. Laxman and Kumar (India)
Ehrsam and Seguin (France) - bye
Tanaka and T. Matsumoto (Japan) def. Kirkland and B. Reimer (Canada)
Guy Grun and J. van Eynde (Belgium) def. Flood and G. Marett (New Zealand)
Werner Waldispuehl and Walter Isenschmied (Switzerland) def. Willi Brinkmann and Luft (West Germany)
Nicholson and Taylor (Great Britain) def. Long and Baracatt (Jamaica)
Tony South and Alan Conn (Australia) def. Ganesh and Jeena (India)
Klemens and Classon (United States) def. Schaede and Elbracht (West Germany)
Schelfaut and Aimé Desal (Belgium) def. Johansson and Hansson (Sweden)
Maraschin and Girard (France) def. Bernard Boulens and Arthur Studer (Switzerland)
Francesco Deiana and Raimondo Longhi (Italy) def. George Mann and Glynn Griffiths (Rhodesia)
J. Meyer and Margaret Harriman (South Africa) def. Brown and Lean (New Zealand)
J. Robertson and Todd (Great Britain) def. Wilson and Hamilton (Canada)
Lorente and Llorens (Spain) def. Kerrigan and Hugues (Ireland)

In the second round, Geissinger and Kelderhouse (USA) beat Fowler and Bawden (AUS); Koten and Sala (ITA) beat Ehrsam and Seguin (FRA); Tanaka and Matsumoto (JPN) beat Grun and van Eynde (BEL); Waldispuehl and Isenschmied (SUI) beat Nicholson and Taylor (GBR); South and Conn (AUS) beat Klemens and Classon (USA); Schelfaut and Desal (BEL) beat Maraschin and Girard (FRA); Deiana and Longhi (ITA) beat Meyer and Harriman (RHO); and Robertson and Todd (GBR) beat Lorente and Llorens (ESP).

In the quarter-finals, Geissinger and Kelderhouse defeated Koten and Sala; Tanaka and Matsumoto eliminated Waldispuehl and Isenschmied; Schelfaut and Desal fell to South and Conn; while Deiana and Longhi beat Robertson and Todd.

The American pair defeated their Japanese rivals in the first semi-final, while the Australians beat the Italians in the other. The Japanese and Italian pairs were jointly awarded the bronze medal, while Americans and Australians met in the final, where Geissinger and Kelderhouse emerged with the gold medal.

Mixed

Year	Gold	Silver	Bronze
1968	Geissinger & Kelderhouse; United States (USA)	Tony South & Alan Conn; Australia (AUS)	Francesco Deiana & Raimondo Longhi; Italy (ITA) and Tanaka & T. Matsumoto; Japan (JPN)

=== 1972 ===
At the 1972 Games, dartchery was expanded and divided into three events: mixed pairs, men's pairs, and women's pairs. The International Paralympic Committee has not recorded participation numbers nor the details of the competitions for this year; only the list of medallists.

Mixed

Year	Gold	Silver	Bronze
1972	Becker & Schaede; West Germany (FRG)	Kim Keun Soo & Cho Keum Im; South Korea (KOR)	Dropko & Collins; United States (USA)

Men's

Year	Gold	Silver	Bronze
1972	E. Hammel & Elbracht; West Germany (FRG)	P. Popkema & P. Blanker; Netherlands (NED)	Seilleur & van Braet; Belgium (BEL)

Women's

Year	Gold	Silver	Bronze
1972	Margaret Maughan & M. Cooper; Great Britain (GBR)	Marraschin & Girard; France (FRA)	Berg-Holmen & W. Warberg; Norway (NOR)

=== 1976 ===
The results recorded for 1976 are based on the number of victories achieved by each pair.

Mixed
J. M. Chapuis and Marraschin (FRA), G. Matthews and D. Lilley (GBR), Katsuhiro Hamanoue and Tomoko Yamazaki (JPN) and Casper Caspersen and Karlsen (NOR) all lost every match, but are ranked ninth, tenth, eleventh and twelfth, respectively.
E. Ell and B. Ward (CAN), Anneliese Dersen and H. Geiss (FRG), A. Luks and Bodil Elgh (SWE), and Jay Brown and Sally Staudte (USA) each won one match, and are ranked fifth, sixth, seventh and eighth, respectively.
Ana Maria Tenorio and Carlos Guadiana, of Mexico, won two games, and finished fourth.
Aimé Desal and Alice Verhee, of Belgium, won three games, and the bronze medal.
Arvo Kalenius and Elli Korva, of Finland, won four games, and the silver medal.
John Kestel and M. Ross, of Australia, won five games, and the gold medal.

Year	Gold	Silver	Bronze
1976	John Kestel & M. Ross; Australia (AUS)	Arvo Kalenius & Elli Korva; Finland (FIN)	Aimé Desal & Alice Verhee; Belgium (BEL)

Men's

- Tenth to fifteenth, with 0 victories: Guy Grun & Jozef Meysen (BEL); Robson S. Almeida & Manuel Alves (BRA); R. Schmidberger & Elbracht (FRG); Vitalino Marroquin & Alfonso Reynoso (GUA); James Garrifan & Clause Stevens (IRL); Kim Yoon Bae & Tu Sung Kou (KOR).
- Fifth to ninth, with 1 victory: J. Robertson & I. Smith (GBR); Shigenobu Hashiguchi & Kenichi Tomita (JPN); T. Skogmo & Oddbjorn Stebekk (NOR); U. Hornlund & M. Eden (SWE); Roy Fowler & J. Heath (AUS).
- Fourth, with 2 victories: T. Parker & C. Ladd (CAN)
- Third, with 3 victories: P. Blanker & P. Popkema (NED)
- Second, with 4 victories: Patrick Krishner & Timothy van der Meiden (USA)
- First, with 5 victories: A. Piutti & Thore (FRA)

Year	Gold	Silver	Bronze
1980	A. Piutti & Thore; France (FRA)	Patrick Krishner & Timothy van der Meiden; United States (USA)	P. Blanker & P. Popkema; Netherlands (NED)

Women's

to be added

=== 1980 ===
to be added

== Medal table ==
Rank	Nation	Gold	Silver	Bronze	Total
1	United States (USA)	2	2	0	4
2	Rhodesia (RHO)	1	0	0	1
3	Australia (AUS)	0	1	0	1
3	South Korea (KOR)	0	1	0	1
5	Italy (ITA)	0	0	2	2
5	Japan (JPN)	0	0	2	2
7	France (FRA)	0	0	1	1
Totals (7 entries)		3	4	5	12
