= Archery at the 1972 Summer Paralympics – Men's FITA round open =

Men's FITA Round Open at the IV Paralympic Games
- Paralympic Athletics
- Competitors: 36 from 15 nations

Medalists
| 1st place, gold medalist(s) | | E. Hammel | West Germany |
| 2nd place, silver medalist(s) | | Roy Fowler | Australia |
| 3rd place, bronze medalist(s) | | Popke Popkema | Netherlands |

The Men's FITA Round Open was one of the events held in Archery at the 1972 Summer Paralympics in Heidelberg. There were 36 competitors in the event. E. Hammel of West Germany won the gold medal.

== Report ==
In this event and a 36-strong field, it was anyone's game but the local hero was E. Hammel who stunned the opposition and took the Paralympic gold, beating his rival, Australian Roy Fowler, by 86 points. The Dutchman, Popke Popkema, was in defence of his Paralympic title but had to settle for third place and a bronze medal.

Hammel would also win the gold in the team event, with his German team-mates and also win gold in dartchery completing a 100% record for the archer in his home Paralympics.

== Results ==
=== Final ===
| Rank | Athlete | Points |
|---|---|---|
| 1st place, gold medalist(s) | E. Hammel (FRG) | 2244 |
| 2nd place, silver medalist(s) | Roy Fowler (AUS) | 2158 |
| 3rd place, bronze medalist(s) | Popke Popkema (NED) | 2151 |
| 4 | Willi Brinkmann (FRG) | 2088 |
| 5 | Gene Geissinger (USA) | 2060 |
| 6 | Elbracht (FRG) | 2056 |
| 7 | Peter Blanker (NED) | 2054 |
| 8 | Werner Waldispuehl (SUI) | 2006 |
| 9 | Guy Grun (BEL) | 1981 |
| 10 | Gérard van Opdorp (NED) | 1959 |
| 11 | O. Grindvik (NOR) | 1958 |
| 12 | Ventadour (FRA) | 1935 |
| 13 | Thore (FRA) | 1934 |
| 14 | Ian Rowson (GBR) | 1933 |
| 15 | Tony South (AUS) | 1891 |
| 16 | Bill White (GBR) | 1886 |
| 17 | Walter Meier (SUI) | 1779 |
| 18 | Raymond Schelfaut (BEL) | 1763 |
| 19 | Berry (FRA) | 1753 |
| 20 | Bernard Boulens (SUI) | 1737 |
| 21 | Seilleur (BEL) | 1734 |
| 22 | Alan Conn (AUS) | 1719 |
| 23 | Mazzolo (ITA) | 1711 |
| 24 | J. Meyer (RSA) | 1687 |
| 25 | Tsuchiya (JPN) | 1652 |
| 26 | Brian Spiller (GBR) | 1642 |
| 27 | Eric Johansson (SWE) | 1634 |
| 28 | Hegle (NOR) | 1621 |
| 29 | Kazimier Mechula (DEN) | 1602 |
| 30 | Jim Mathis (USA) | 1542 |
| 31 | Eto (JPN) | 1561 |
| 32 | Oddbjorn Stebekk (NOR) | 1502 |
| 33 | Szobozlai (HUN) | 1485 |
| 34 | Classon (USA) | 1461 |
| 35 | Fornitz (DEN) | 1460 |
| 36 | Jensen (DEN) | 1311 |
