= Janet Tyler (nurse) =

Australian women nurse

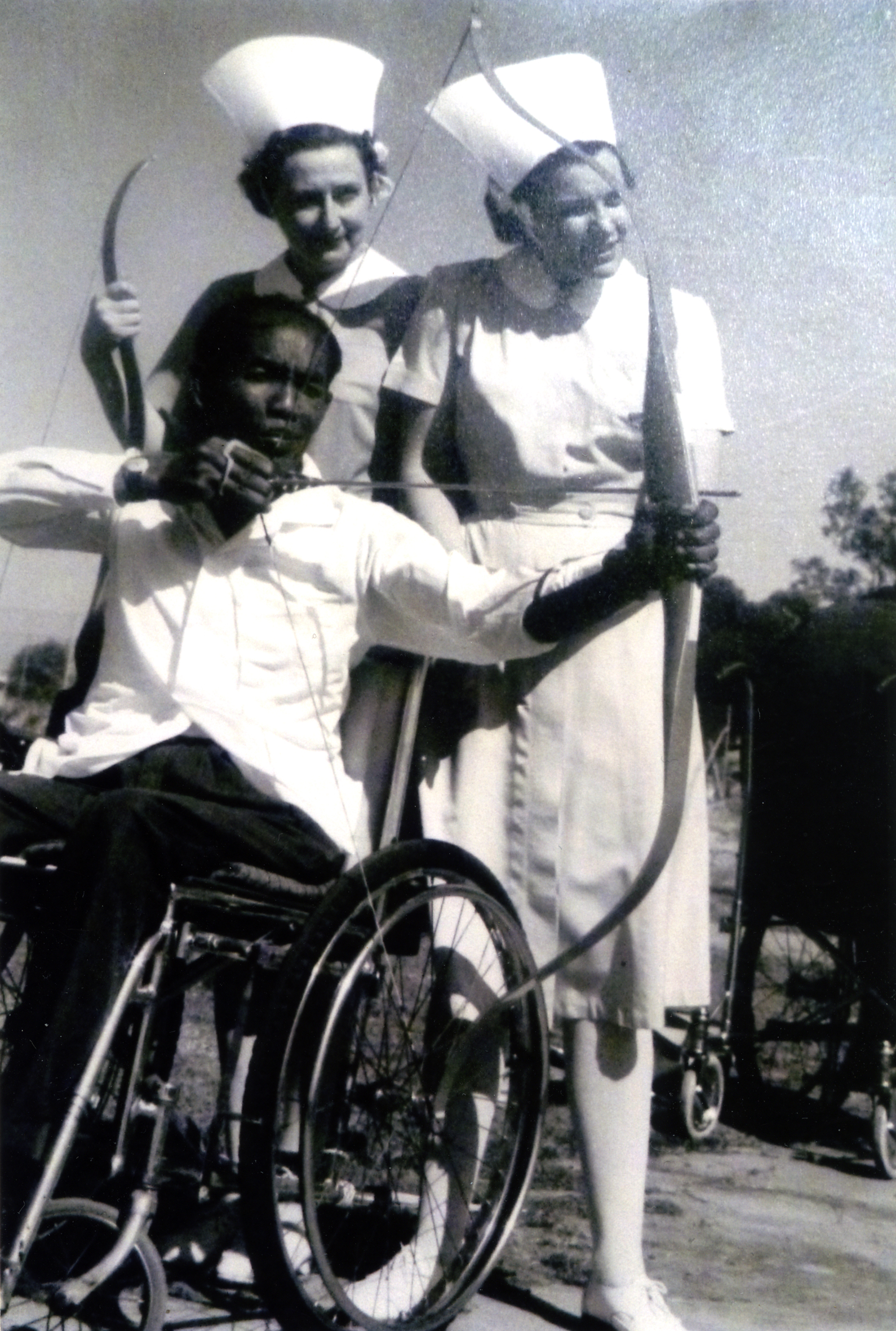
Janet Tyler (right) with Sister Quigley and athlete Ali Bin Salleh at a sporting event for paraplegic athletes in Adelaide in the 1960s.

Janet Tyler is an Australian registered nurse who was a member of the medical team selected to care for Australian athletes at the 1968 Summer Paralympics, Israel. She specialised in spinal nursing and rehabilitation at the Royal Adelaide Hospital and the Hampstead Rehabilitation Centre annex of Royal Adelaide Hospital, throughout the forty three years of her nursing career. Tyler was Senior Registered Nurse from 1964 to 1977, Clinical Nurse Coordinator from 1977 to 1986, Acting Nurse Manager at the Hampstead Centre from 1986 to 1994, Life Member of the Registered Nurse Association since 1951, Life Member of the Paraplegic and Quadriplegic Association of South Australia since 1977 and Justice of the Peace for over 30 years.

== Personal ==
Tyler born in 1933, at Qambi Hospital, Adelaide in South Australia, lived with her parents J.C.S. Tyler an English Army Officer, mother Natalie Tyler at Kensington Gardens a suburb of Adelaide, and was educated at Woodlands Church of England Girls Grammar School Glenelg. Her love of nursing began at the Resuscitation Clinic (the Blood Bank) of Royal Adelaide Hospital in 1951.

== Career ==
The completion of Tyler's formal nursing education at Royal Adelaide Hospital from 1952 to 1955, led to her involvement in establishing the acute and rehabilitation Spinal Cord Injury Service in South Australia in 1958, now known as the South Australian Spinal Cord Injury Service (SASCIS).

Responsible for setting up the (acute) phase 1, the 10 bed spinal unit for patients in Grey Ward of Royal Adelaide Hospital in 1961, Sister Tyler later commissioned the first spinal injury rehabilitation ward, phase 2 (long-term rehabilitation) in the Morris Wards at the Hampstead Rehabilitation Centre, sanctioned by the Director General of Medical Services Dr J.W. Rollinson in 1962. She officially closed the Morris Wards when the long-awaited new Spinal Injury Unit and new Hydrotherapy Pool opened within the new Hampstead Rehabilitation Centre in 1994.

Not supported by theory, nursing practice was gained by unique practical experience in special units of the hospital. Tyler's initial experience was obtained over a two-year period at the Department of Paraplegia, Royal Perth Hospital, Western Australia in 1961. This unit was pioneered by Australian Orthopaedic Surgeon Sir George Bedbrook, where sport played an important role in rehabilitation

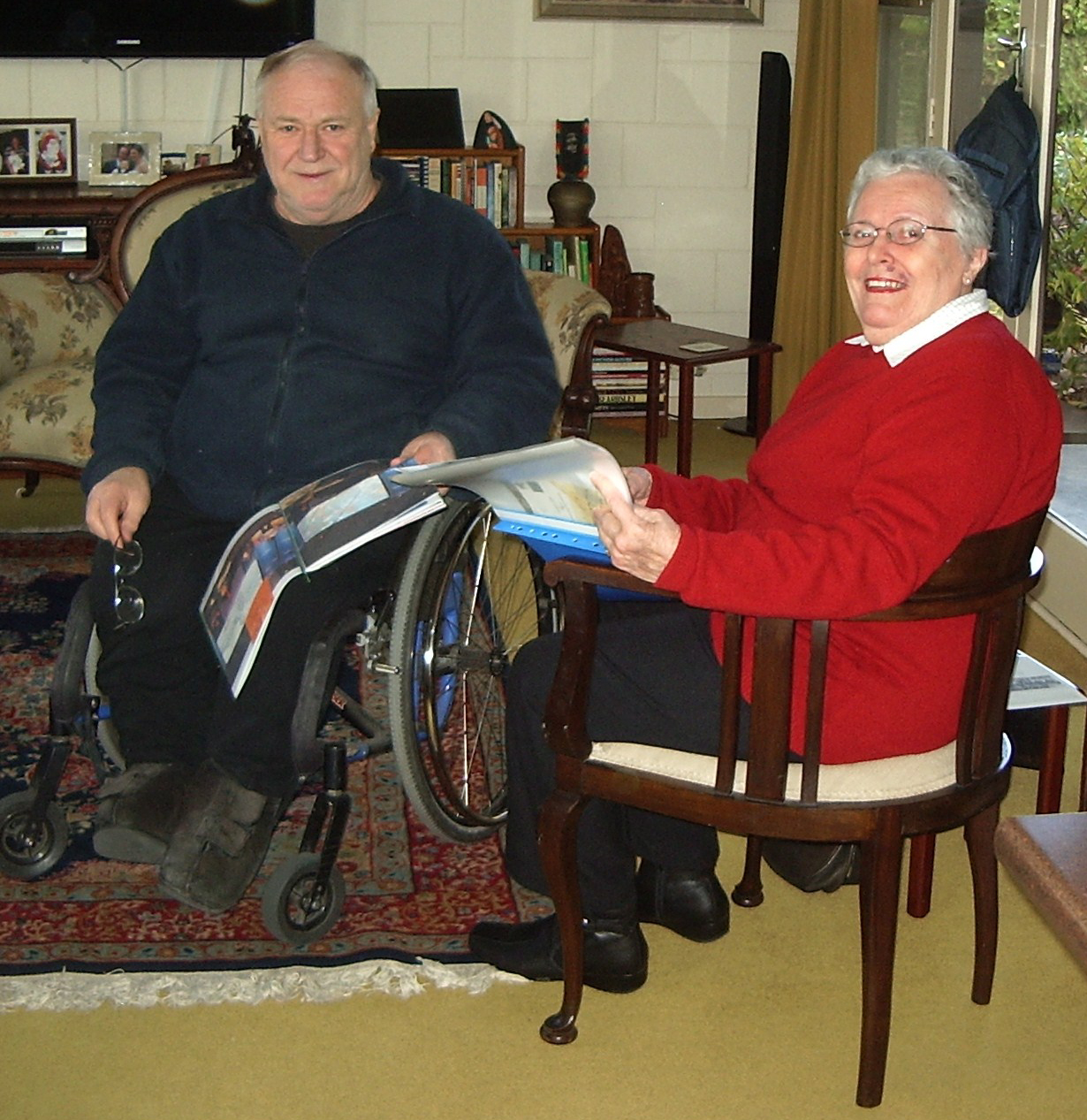
South Australian Paralympian Kevin Munro and Janet Tyler reminisce at a reunion of the South Australian members of the 1968 Australian Paralympic team in Adelaide in June 2013.

Tyler was instrumental in gaining financial support for the construction of the first Hydrotherapy Pool at the Hampstead Rehabilitation Centre from Dame Ruby Litchfield of the Telethon Charities in 1972. This was granted and the pool opened in 1973.

She was Senior Nurse and Assistant Manager for the Inaugural South Australian National Spinal Games held at the Hampstead Centre in 1964, Senior Nurse at the Asia Pacific Games Tokyo, in 1972, and organised the National Paralympic Games, interstate, every two years.

Appointed a member of the medical team at the 1968 Summer Paralympics, Tel Aviv, Israel, Tyler gave her professional support and care to the 32 athletes of the Australian team, many of whom had a disability from a spinal injury, winning 32 medals from 7 sports to finish fourth on the medal tally. This was the first team to include South Australia athletes at the Paralympic Games which, at that time, only catered for wheelchair athletes.

Tyler said Looking after my boys and girls, my Para Quads, was my life, at an interview on being awarded the medal OAM, the Order of Australia, in recognition of a long and distinguished career particularly in the field of spinal injury rehabilitation. Tyler's 'boys and girls' include Australian Paralympians Kevin Munro, Richard Oliver, Troy Andrews, Neil Lillecrapp, Kevin Bawden, Libby Kosmala

Tyler was awarded the Medal of the Order of Australia (OAM) for her contributions to nursing and spinal cord injury rehabilitation.

== See also ==
- Australia at the 1968 Summer Paralympics
