= Abominable (2006 film) =

- Theatrical release poster
- Directed by: Ryan Schifrin
- Written by: Ryan Schifrin; James Morrison
- Produced by: Donna Cockrell; Theresa Eastman; Paul Spadone
- Starring: Matt McCoy; Haley Joel; Jeffrey Combs; Paul Gleason; Rex Linn; Phil Morris; Dee Wallace Stone
- Cinematography: Neal Fredericks
- Edited by: Chris Conlee
- Music by: Lalo Schifrin
- Production company: Red Circle Productions
- Distributed by: Freestyle Releasing
- Release dates: April 10, 2006 (New York City); October 3, 2006 (United States)
- Running time: 94 minutes
- Country: United States
- Language: English

Abominable is a 2006 American horror film, directed and written by Ryan Schifrin. Starring Matt McCoy, Jeffrey Combs, Lance Henriksen, Rex Linn, Dee Wallace, Phil Morris, Paul Gleason and Haley Joel. The film follows paraplegic widower Preston Rogers (McCoy) as he moves back into the remote cabin where he and his now-deceased wife once lived. Preston quickly realizes that a sadistic Sasquatch is stalking the woods around the cabin, but nobody believes him.

== Plot ==
Farmers Billy and Ethel Hoss are terrorized in the middle of the night by a giant figure that kills their horse and dog and leaves large footprints in their yard.

The next day, paraplegic wheelchair user Preston Rogers goes to a secluded cottage in the woods with his home care nurse Otis. A group of women named Karen, Michelle, C.J., Tracy, and Amanda arrive to stay in the cabin next door for a bachelorette party. Otis departs for town and night falls. Preston observes as Karen steps outside, but does not notice as something abducts her. He sees her cellphone lying on the ground and correctly surmises something has happened to her. He then notices a telephone pole has been knocked over, preventing him from being able to call anyone. Using his binoculars, he looks into the woods and sees a pair of large eyes staring directly at him. Terrified, Preston goes back inside and turns off all the lights. Otis returns and Preston tries to tell him what he saw, but Otis does not believe him.

Elsewhere, Billy and his friends Ziegler Dane and Buddy are out hunting for the same monster, which they believe to be a Bigfoot. Dane finds a cave and discovers a mortally wounded Karen. The beast returns and drags Karen back into the cave while Dane runs back to the group. They attempt to attack the creature but are all killed.

Preston tries to contact the police to inform them of the creature via email. Though Deputy McBride wants to check on Preston despite disbelieving his claim, his superior Sheriff Halderman is flippant and refuses to allow him to do so. Preston sees that the remaining women are looking for Karen and asks Otis to go over and tell them what he saw, but Otis refuses. Preston then watches as Tracy is killed by the creature. Preston becomes hysterical and Otis attempts to sedate him, but Preston gains control of the syringe and tranquilizes Otis. Preston then looks out the window: the creature appears, roaring at him. Preston faints in terror. Sometime later Preston wakes up to a still-sedated Otis and the creature gone from the window. He receives a dismissive email response from Halderman, and then screams out the window to warn the remaining women next door. Shortly after the beast invades their cabin. Michelle and C.J. both fall victim to the monster, but Amanda is able to make it to Preston's house.

Preston comforts Amanda, and tells her that he only recently became a wheelchair user. Several months earlier Preston and his wife were rock climbing when their cables snapped. His wife fell to her death while Preston survived. Amanda and Preston formulate a plan to trap the creature and escape. The power goes out and the Bigfoot breaks into the cabin, forcing them to escape down the balcony with rope. Preston makes it to the ground but Amanda is taken by the creature. She is then saved by Otis, who strikes the creature in the back with an axe, causing it to drop Amanda. The attack does not kill it, and the enraged beast kills Otis by chewing off his face. Amanda and Preston make it to the car, but the creature causes them to crash. Amanda is ejected from the vehicle and knocked out. Preston then drives into the creature, ramming it into a tree, causing the axe from Otis' attack to impale it.

Preston crawls over to Amanda as the creature dies, and the two head off down the road. Deputy McBride finds them and calls in his fellow officers and paramedics. Preston and Amanda are then taken to safety in an ambulance, while the police head back to the cabins. At the cabins, McBride discovers the creature has vanished, while Halderman leads the rest of his men into the woods. They hear noises and see multiple Bigfoots hiding in the trees growling at them.

== Cast ==
- Matt McCoy as Preston Rogers
- Haley Joel as Amanda
- Karin Anna Cheung as C.J.
- Natalie Compagno as Michelle
- Tiffany Shepis as Tracy
- Ashley Hartman as Karen Herdberger
- Christien Tinsley as Otis Wilhelm
- Michael Deak as Bigfoot ("Monster")
- Jeffrey Combs as Buddy Boy
- Lance Henriksen as Ziegler Dane
- Rex Linn as Billy Hoss
- Dee Wallace as Ethel Hoss
- Paul Gleason as Sheriff Dick Halderman
- Chad Smith as Deputy Parker
- Phil Morris as Deputy McBride
- Paul Spadone as Deputy Jackson
- Josh Wolfe as Deputy Conners

== Production ==
Ryan Schifrin had actors Matt McCoy and Jeffrey Combs in mind when writing the script. McCoy and Schifrin had known one another for years before the film was made. The film was heavily inspired by Alfred Hitchcock's film Rear Window (1954). Schifrin confirmed that he had described it as "Rear Window but as a creature feature" when pitching the film to investors.

Christien Tinsley, who plays Otis in the film, also served as the lead special effects artist. Tinsley designed the creature as well as the rest of the film's practical effects. The creature suit was slightly over seven feet tall.

Abominable was filmed primarily in Idyllwild–Pine Cove, California. Principal photography lasted 24 days. Additional photography took place in a Los Angeles soundstage.

The scene where Hoss, Ziegler and Buddy are killed was filmed over a year after principal photography had concluded. The scene was conceived of during post-production and was filmed in Griffith Park. The monster's cave is located in the Bronson Canyon, a popular filming location used in many other productions.

Cinematographer Neal Fredericks used 35mm film stock to give the film a more dated appearance. Fredericks died in a plane crash during post-production and the film is dedicated to his memory. He was able to see a cut of the film before his death, and it was one of the last films he made.

Post-production was handled at the Skywalker Ranch.

For the creature sounds, a wide range of animal vocalizations were implemented. The main breathing sound was the sound of a panting horse slowed down. The snarling and purring sounds were from a lion, tiger, leopard, jaguar, and clouded leopard. Whenever the creature would groan in pain, roars and rumbles from an elephant were the main sound; grunts and snorts from a hippopotamus, howls from a howler monkey, gurgles from a camel, and squeals from a tapir were also used.

== Release ==
Abominable premiered theatrically on April 10, 2006, in New York City by Freestyle Releasing. The film later screened at Fantastic Fest on September 28.

=== Home media ===
The film was released on DVD by Anchor Bay on October 3, 2006. It was later released as a repackaged edition by Lionsgate on May 6, 2008. On February 13, 2018, it was announced that the film would be released for the first time on Blu-ray as a collector's edition by MVD Rewind. The release contained improved CGI effects, overseen by director Schifrin and editor Conlee.

== Reception ==
The review aggregator Rotten Tomatoes reported that 69% of critics gave the film a positive review based on 16 reviews, with an average rating of 5.60/10. Metacritic gave the movie a weighted average score of 31 out of 100 based on six critics, which corresponds to "generally unfavorable" reviews.

Jeremy Wheeler from AllMovie gave the film a positive review, writing, "what really makes Abominable such a fun ride is its willingness to let loose with the bloody Bigfoot carnage." Wheeler also commended the film's soundtrack, and direction. JoBlo.com positively reviewed the film. While conceding that the pace was a little slow, reviewer Arrow in the Head stated, "Not only was it a killer Bigfoot movie, which is something that I haven't seen often enough, but it was also a well written and executed one." Mark L. Miller of Ain't It Cool News gave it a positive review, having especially enjoyed the design of the creature. Maitland MacDonagh from TV Guide called the film "an old-fashioned monster movie that relies more on genuine suspense than bare breasts and blood". MacDonagh also commended the film's soundtrack, atmosphere, and "man in a monster suit" approach. Jon Condit of Dread Central gave the film a score of three and a half out of five, praising the film's creature effects and mounting tension, while criticizing the film's occasionally stupid characters.

== See also ==
- Loch Ness Terror
