= Dartchery at the 1968 Summer Paralympics =

Dartchery at the III Paralympic Games

Medalists
1st place, gold medalist(s)		Geissinger; Kelderhouse	United States
2nd place, silver medalist(s)		Alan Conn; Tony South	Australia
3rd place, bronze medalist(s)		Francesco Deiana; Raimondo Longhi	Italy
3rd place, bronze medalist(s)		T. Matsumoto; Tanaka	Japan

Dartchery at the 1968 Summer Paralympics consisted of a mixed pairs event.

== Medal summary ==
Event	Gold	Silver	Bronze
Mixed pairs open	United States (USA); Geissinger; Kelderhouse	Australia (AUS); Alan Conn; Tony South	Italy (ITA); Francesco Deiana; Raimondo Longhi
Mixed pairs open	United States (USA); Geissinger; Kelderhouse	Australia (AUS); Alan Conn; Tony South	Japan (JPN); T. Matsumoto; Tanaka
