= Archery at the 1984 Summer Paralympics - Women's double FITA round paraplegic =

Women's double FITA round paraplegic at the VII Paralympic Games
- Paralympic Archery
- Competitors: 8 from 10 nations

Medalists
| 1st place, gold medalist(s) | | Susan Hagel | United States |
| 2nd place, silver medalist(s) | | Hifumi Suzuki | Japan |
| 3rd place, bronze medalist(s) | | Susan Davies | Australia |

The Women's double FITA round paraplegic was an archery competition at the 1984 Summer Paralympics.

The American archer Susan Hagel won the gold medal.

== Results ==
| Rank | Athlete | Points |
|---|---|---|
| 1st place, gold medalist(s) | Susan Hagel (USA) | 2267 |
| 2nd place, silver medalist(s) | Hifumi Suzuki (JPN) | 2187 |
| 3rd place, bronze medalist(s) | Susan Davies (AUS) | 2169 |
| 4 | Wilma Anic (GBR) | 2153 |
| 5 | Sirkka Liisa Collin (FIN) | 2148 |
| 6 | K. Kiesslich (FRG) | 2135 |
| 7 | Carol Johnson (GBR) | 2131 |
| 8 | Bodil Elgh (SWE) | 2101 |
| 9 | L. Sickelmann (FRG) | 2079 |
| 10 | J. Lewis (CAN) | 1728 |
