= List of Paralympic medalists in dartchery =

== History ==
Dartchery (a combination of darts and archery) was contested between 1960 and 1980. It only hosted one event in 1960 where there was a mixed open event.

== Summary medal table ==
Summer Paralympics Dartchery medal table
Rank	Nation	Gold	Silver	Bronze	Total
1	United States (USA)	3	3	2	8
2	West Germany (FRG)	3	0	0	3
3	France (FRA)	1	1	2	4
4	Great Britain (GBR)	1	1	1	3
5	Australia (AUS)	1	1	0	2
5	Finland (FIN)	1	1	0	2
7	Rhodesia (RHO)	1	0	0	1
7	Sweden (SWE)	1	0	0	1
9	Belgium (BEL)	0	1	2	3
9	Norway (NOR)	0	1	2	3
11	Netherlands (NED)	0	1	1	2
12	New Zealand (NZL)	0	1	0	1
12	South Korea (KOR)	0	1	0	1
14	Italy (ITA)	0	0	1	1
14	South Africa (RSA)	0	0	1	1
Totals (15 entries)		12	12	12	36
