= Paul Gleason =

American actor (1939–2006)

- Gleason in 1984
- Born: Paul Xavier Gleason; May 4, 1939; Jersey City, New Jersey, U.S.
- Died: May 27, 2006 (aged 67); Burbank, California, U.S.
- Resting place: Westwood Village Memorial Park Cemetery
- Education: Florida State University
- Occupation: Actor
- Years active: 1962–2006
- Spouses: Candy Moore (m. 1971; div. 1978) Susan Kehl (m. 1995)
- Children: 2

Paul Xavier Gleason (May 4, 1939 – May 27, 2006) was an American film and television actor. He was known for his roles on television series such as All My Children and films such as The Breakfast Club, Trading Places, and Die Hard.

== Early life ==
Gleason was born on May 4, 1939, in Jersey City, New Jersey, the son of Eleanor (née Doyle), a registered nurse, and George L. Gleason, a restaurateur, professional boxer, iron worker, and roofing manufacturer. Gleason was raised in Miami Beach, Florida. At age 16, he ran away from home and hitchhiked across the east coast, sleeping on beaches and playing baseball. He attended North Miami High School and Florida State University, where he played football with Burt Reynolds. He signed a professional baseball contract with the Cleveland Indians, but played just briefly in two minor league seasons between 1959 and 1960.

In 1960, a West Coast trip led to an introduction to Ozzie Nelson, which, in turn, led to an appearance on Ozzie and Harriet (per Nelson's habit of hiring athletes for guest spots on the show). Suddenly, acting was an option, and an increasingly attractive one, given Gleason's failing baseball career. He moved to New York City, eventually joining The Actors Studio, where he would study for four years before moving to Los Angeles.

== Career ==
Gleason starred in many movies, often as an antagonistic figure, and became well-known initially as David Thornton on All My Children, playing the role from 1976 to 1978. He then portrayed Capt. Ernest "Tex" Lee in the 1979 television miniseries Ike. He guest-starred in "The Trouble with Harry" and "Fire", Columbo and two episodes of The A-Team. Additionally, Gleason played the villainous Clarence Beeks, the Duke brothers' security consultant and fixer, in the 1983 comedy Trading Places starring Dan Aykroyd and Eddie Murphy.

Gleason played the disciplinarian Vice Principal Richard Vernon, in the 1985 coming-of-age film The Breakfast Club opposite many members of the Brat Pack. The film has been noted as one of the most prominent and well-remembered of its genre, and many reviews praised Gleason's performance as the vice principal who was frequently at odds with members of the titular group, particularly Judd Nelson's John Bender. In an on-set interview, Gleason spoke at length about the skill of the teenage actors he worked with, adding that he believed he "could never have been as good at [their] age." He also described the finale of the film, during which Vernon reads an essay from the Club dismantling his assertions about them, as a satori for the character, stating that Vernon is "supposed to realize something about the fact that he has let these kids down, and that he really hasn't understood them."

He played similar characters in the 1988 film Johnny Be Good (as a high school football coach), the 2002 film Van Wilder (as an antagonistic professor), and on several episodes of the TV sitcom Boy Meets World (as a university dean). He directly parodied his Breakfast Club role in the 2000 A-Teens music video for "Dancing Queen" and in the 2001 comedy film Not Another Teen Movie. In 2006, The Breakfast Club received a special citation at the MTV Movie Awards, honoring the film's continued influence; Gleason and several other members of the cast were present to accept the award. When Gleason died the same year, his NPR obituary referred to his turn as Vernon, referring to Gleason as "a 'principal' screen presence."

Gleason was known to Star Wars fans for his role as Jeremitt Towani in the 1985 made-for-TV film Ewoks: The Battle for Endor. In 1988, Gleason played Deputy Police Chief Dwayne T. Robinson in the Bruce Willis action film, Die Hard. In his review of the film, critic Roger Ebert described Gleason's character as having "one purpose: to be consistently wrong at every step of the way," and as a foil for Willis and Reginald VelJohnson. In late 1997, Gleason guest starred on Walker, Texas Ranger in the episode Brainchild. In the episode, he played the owner of a research facility who has held an employee hostage leaving a telepathic kid, Chad Morgan (David Gallagher), to work with Texas Ranger Cordell Walker (Chuck Norris) to arrest him. The episode reunited him with fellow Die Hard co-star Clarence Gilyard, who plays Jimmy Trivette on the show, although they don't share any scenes together in the film.

In 2002, Gleason appeared in episodes of Dawson's Creek as Larry Newman, the sex-and-violence obsessed chief of a B movie studio. He appeared as a nonsensical judge in an episode of Drake & Josh, as well as in an episode of George Lopez as the brother of George's boss, a crazy old drunk. In 2005, he appeared as the Sheriff in the horror film Abominable. Gleason made a guest appearance on Friends as Jack, Phoebe's boss at an investment company, in the season 6 episode "The One That Could Have Been," and also appeared in one episode of Seinfeld, as the man ultimately responsible for George Costanza (Jason Alexander) being hired by the New York Yankees. His final appearance before his death was in an independent film called The Book of Caleb.

== Personal life ==
Gleason, in addition to his acting career, participated in many celebrity charity golf events each year, and was known to mingle with fans and sign autographs during these golf tournaments. Shortly before his death, he also published a book of poetry. During his Minor League Baseball career, he also struck up a friendship with Ted Williams, which he later discussed in the book Ted Williams: A Tribute, published in 1997. Actor Jimmy Hawkins, a friend of Gleason's, stated after his death that "he always had great stories to tell."

From 1971 to 1978, he was married to actress Candy Moore; they had one daughter. From 1995 until his death, he was married to Susan Kehl; they had one daughter.

== Death ==
Gleason died on May 27, 2006, at a Burbank, California, hospital from pleural mesothelioma, a cancer of the lining of the lung connected with asbestos, which he is thought to have contracted from asbestos exposure on building sites while working for his father as a teenager. Gleason was 67 years old. He is buried near the southeast corner of the Westwood Village Memorial Park Cemetery in Westwood, Los Angeles.

== Filmography ==
Paul Gleason film and television credits
Year	Title	Role	Notes
1962	Panic in Year Zero!	Gas Station Owner (uncredited)	Film (debut)
1965	Winter A-Go-Go	Ski Resort Guest	Film
1967	It's About Time	Man	1 episode (TV debut)
1967	The Green Hornet	Paul Garrett	1 episode
1967	C'mon, Let's Live a Little	Frat Boy (uncredited)	Film
1967	The Invaders	Alien	2 Episodes: "The Experiment" & "Task Force"
1968	The F.B.I.	Officer Dan Ryan	1 episode
1968	The Secret War of Harry Frigg	Prisoner (uncredited)	Film
1969	Then Came Bronson	Deputy	1 episode
1971	Private Duty Nurses	Dr. McClintock	Film
1971–1974	Adam-12	Smitty / Patrolman Arnold / Instructor Chuck; Williams / John Suntor	4 episodes
1972	Where Does It Hurt?	Mr. Leffingwell's Aide	Film
1972	Mission: Impossible	Blair	1 episode
1972	Banacek	Border Guard	1 episode
1972	Hit Man	Cop (uncredited)	Film
1973	Little Laura and Big John	Sheriff	Film
1975	Doc Savage: The Man of Bronze	Major Thomas J. "Long Tom" Roberts	Film
1975	Columbo	Parsons	1 episode
1976	Vigilante Force	Michael J. Loonius	Film (as Paul X. Gleason)
1976–1978	All My Children	Dr. David Thornton	2 episodes
1979	Women at West Point	Major James T. Kirk	TV movie
1979	Ike	Captain Ernest "Tex" Lee	TV miniseries. AKA Ike: The War Years
1979	The Great Santini	Lieutenant Sammy	Film
1980	He Knows You're Alone	Detective Frank Daley	Film
1981	Fort Apache the Bronx	Detective	Film
1981	Another Life	Lee Carothers #1	TV series
1981	Arthur	Executive	Film
1981	The Pursuit of D.B. Cooper	Remson	Film
1982	MysteryDisc: Murder, Anyone?	Stewart Cavanaugh	Direct-to-video interactive film
1983	Tender Mercies	Reporter	Film
1983	Trading Places	Clarence Beeks	Film
1983	MysteryDisc: Many Roads to Murder	Stewart Cavanaugh	Direct-to-video interactive film
1984	Scarecrow and Mrs. King	Edson Ballon	1 episode
1984	Remington Steele	Sheriff Jeff "Jed" Nebbins	1 episode
1984	Cagney & Lacey	Detective Crespi	1 episode
1984	Call to Glory	Marty Colby	1 episode
1984	Hardcastle and McCormick	Jack Fish	1 episode
1984	Riptide	Detective Commander Phillip Hallins Everitt	2 episodes
1984	Hill Street Blues	Biff Lowe	2 episodes
1984	Magnum, P.I.	Ronnie Meeder / Jacques Arnot	1 episode
1984–1986	The A-Team	Roy Kelsey / Harry Sullivan	2 episodes
1985	The Breakfast Club	Assistant Principal Richard Vernon	Film
1985	Challenge of a Lifetime	John Schoonover	TV movie
1985	Dallas	Lieutenant Lee Spaulding	3 episodes
1985	Anything for Love	Larry Worth	TV movie
1985	Doubletake	Howie Henley	TV movie
1985	Ewoks: The Battle for Endor	Jeremitt	TV movie
1986	Kate & Allie	Tom Fitzgerald	1 episode
1986	Miami Vice	Bunny Berrigan	1 episode
1986	The Equalizer	Greenleaf	Episode: "Tip on a Sure Thing" (S2.E9)
1986	Gimme a Break!	Mr. Kimball	1 episode
1986	Superior Court	Attorney	TV series
1987	Morgan Stewart's Coming Home	Jay Le Soto	Film
1987	Sidekicks	Fargo	1 episode
1987	Falcon Crest	Andy Stryker	1 episode
1987	Forever, Lulu	Robert	Film
1987	Hollywood-Monster	Stan Gordon	Film. West Germany. AKA Ghost Chase (U.S.)
1987	Beauty and the Beast	Henry Dutton	1 episode
1988	She's Having a Baby	Howard	Film
1988	Johnny Be Good	Wayne Hisler	Film
1988	Die Hard	Deputy Police Chief Dwayne T. Robinson	Film
1988	Lifted	Commanding Officer U.S.S Georgetown	TV movie. Supercarrier (pilot)
1989	Night Game	Broussard	Film
1989	21 Jump Street	Phil Daniels	1 episode
1989	Spooner	Roland Bishop	TV movie
1989–1992	Murder, She Wrote	Sterling Rose / Lieutenant Barney Claymore / Steve Morrison	3 episodes
1990	Miami Blues	Sergeant Frank Lackley	Film
1991	Rich Girl	Marvin Wells	Film
1991	L.A. Law	Coach John Lungren	Episode: "Speak, Lawyers, for Me" (S5.E19)
1991	False Arrest	Arthur Ross	TV movie
1992	Wishman	Silverstein	Film
1992	The Wonder Years	Arthur Jensen	Episode: "Scenes from a Wedding" (S6.E3)
1993	Maniac Cop III: Badge of Silence	Hank Cooney	Film
1993	Loaded Weapon 1	FBI Agent	Film
1993	Wild Cactus	Sheriff Brenner	Film
1993	Boiling Point	Transaction Man	Film
1993	Running Cool	Calvin Hogg	Film
1994	Seinfeld	Cushman	Episode: "The Opposite" (S5.E22)
1994	I Love Trouble	Kenny Bacon	Film
1994	Lois & Clark: The New Adventures of Superman	Henry Harrison	Episode: "The Ides of Metropolis") (S1.E6)
1994	There Goes My Baby	Mr. Burton	Film
1994	Nothing to Lose	Elliot	Film
1994	In the Living Years	Tony	Film
1994–1996	One West Waikiki	Captain Dave Herzog	19 episodes
1995	Digital Man	Dr. Parker	Film
1997	Shadow Conspiracy	Blythe	Film
1997	Money Talks	Detective Bobby Pickett	Film
1997	Walker, Texas Ranger	Dr. Harold Payton	Episode: "Brainchild" (S5.E8)
1997	Boy Meets World	Dean Borak	2 episodes
1997	NewsRadio	Steve Johnson	Episode: "The Public Domain" (S4.E3)
1997	A Time to Revenge	Whittmar	Film
1998	Day at the Beach	Detective Johnson	Film
1998	No Code of Conduct	John Bagwell	Film
1998	Best of the Best 4: Without Warning	Father Gil	Film
1999	Nash Bridges	Micky Tripp / Radio DJ	Episode: "Hardball" (S4.E10)
1999	Dancing Queen	Assistant Principal Richard Vernon	Cameo; A-Teens Music video
2000	The Giving Tree	Mr. Forrester	Film
2000	Red Letters	Dean Van Buren	Film
2000	Friends	Jack	Episode: "The One That Could Have Been" (S6.E16)
2001	Not Another Teen Movie	Principal Richard "Dick" Vernon	Film
2001	The Organization	Death	Film
2001	The Myersons	Dean Hanson	Film
2001	Social Misfits	Warden Doyle	Film
2002	National Lampoon's Van Wilder	Professor McDougal	Film
2003	Dawson's Creek	Larry Newman	2 episodes
2004	Drake & Josh	Mr. Thompson	Episode: "Honor Council" (S2.E14)
2004	Malcolm in the Middle	Mystery Man / Gordon Walker	Episode: "Reese Joins the Army" (Parts 1&2, S5.E21-22)
2005	George Lopez	Lou Powers	Episode: "George to the Third Power" (S4.E13)
2005	Cold Case	Stewart Adams	1 episode
2006	Abominable	Sheriff Halderman	Film
2008	The Book of Caleb	James Paddington	Film (posthumous)
2011	The Passing	Detective Sanders	Film (posthumous; final film role)
