= Sally Lamb =

Australian Paralympic swimmer

Personal information
- Nationality: Australia
Medal record
Swimming
Paralympic Games
Silver medal – second place	Tel Aviv	Women's 25 m Backstroke class 2 incomplete

Sally Lamb from Western Australia is an Australian Paralympic swimmer. At the 1968 Tel Aviv Games, she competed in two swimming events and won a silver medal in the Women's 25 m Backstroke Class 2 Incomplete.
