= Jeff Simmonds =

Australian rugby league player & paralympian

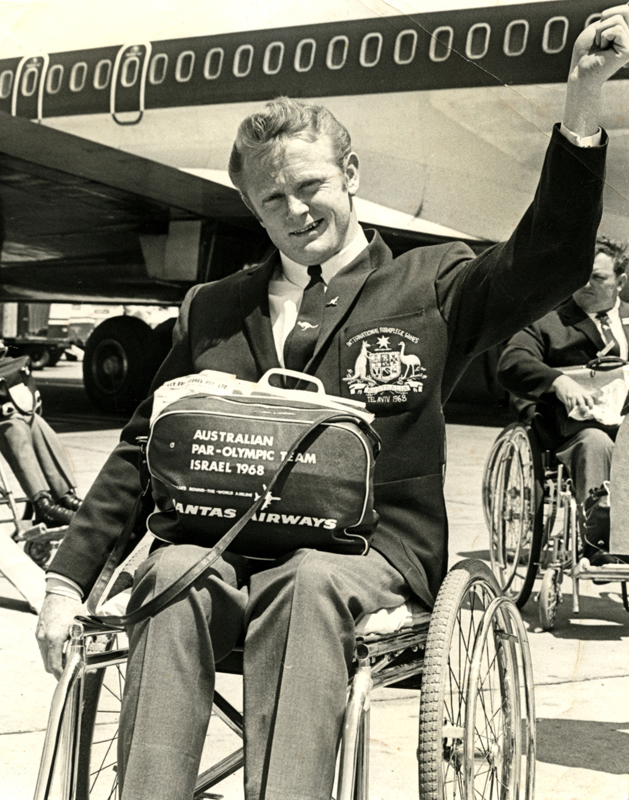

Personal information
- Nationality: Australia
- Born: 27 April 1944 (age 82) Castlecrag, Australia
- Rugby league career

Playing information
- Position: Five-eighth, Scrum-half
Club
Years	Team	Pld	T	G	FG	P
1964–65	North Sydney	10	2	0	0	6
Medal record
Swimming
Paralympic Games
Silver medal – second place	1968 Tel Aviv	Men's 50 m Breaststroke class 3 complete

Jeff Simmonds (born 27 April 1944) is a former swimmer and athlete who participated at the 1968 Tel Aviv Paralympics, winning a silver medal. Before being a Paralympian, he was a notable rugby league half back with North Sydney Leagues Club. His rugby league career ended after a series of concussions and a serious fall.

== Personal ==
Simmonds was born on 27 April 1944 in the Sydney suburb of Castlecrag. At the age of 21, in September 1965 he played in the premiership first grade preliminary final against Souths where he suffered concussion. He then went to Queensland for end of season games where he suffered further concussions. Finally, he fell from a hotel's fire escape in the Queensland town of Sarina. This fall, according to Simmonds, fractured his spine a few inches above the waist and he was then left a paraplegic.

Following the accident, Simmonds, a patient at St Vincent's Hospital, Sydney, received a visit from Kevin Betts, remedial gymnast at Mount Wilga Rehabilitation Centrewho encouraged Simmonds to get back into sport. On moving to Mount Wilga, Simmonds recalls his rehabilitation and sports training under Betts,"He never lets you get the idea he's satisfied with what you are doing. That is his way of making you train harder." In moving into Paralympic sport, The North Shore Clarion reported "Jeff has two things in his favour, superb physical condition and courage"

Before his accident he was a compositor/linotype printer. After his accident he worked in various roles at the North Sydney Leagues Club in clerical work and was the club's first time Coaching Director, and Secretary to the Under 23 Side. His philosophy on life was "I'm normal and that's the way I expect to be treated".

== Career ==
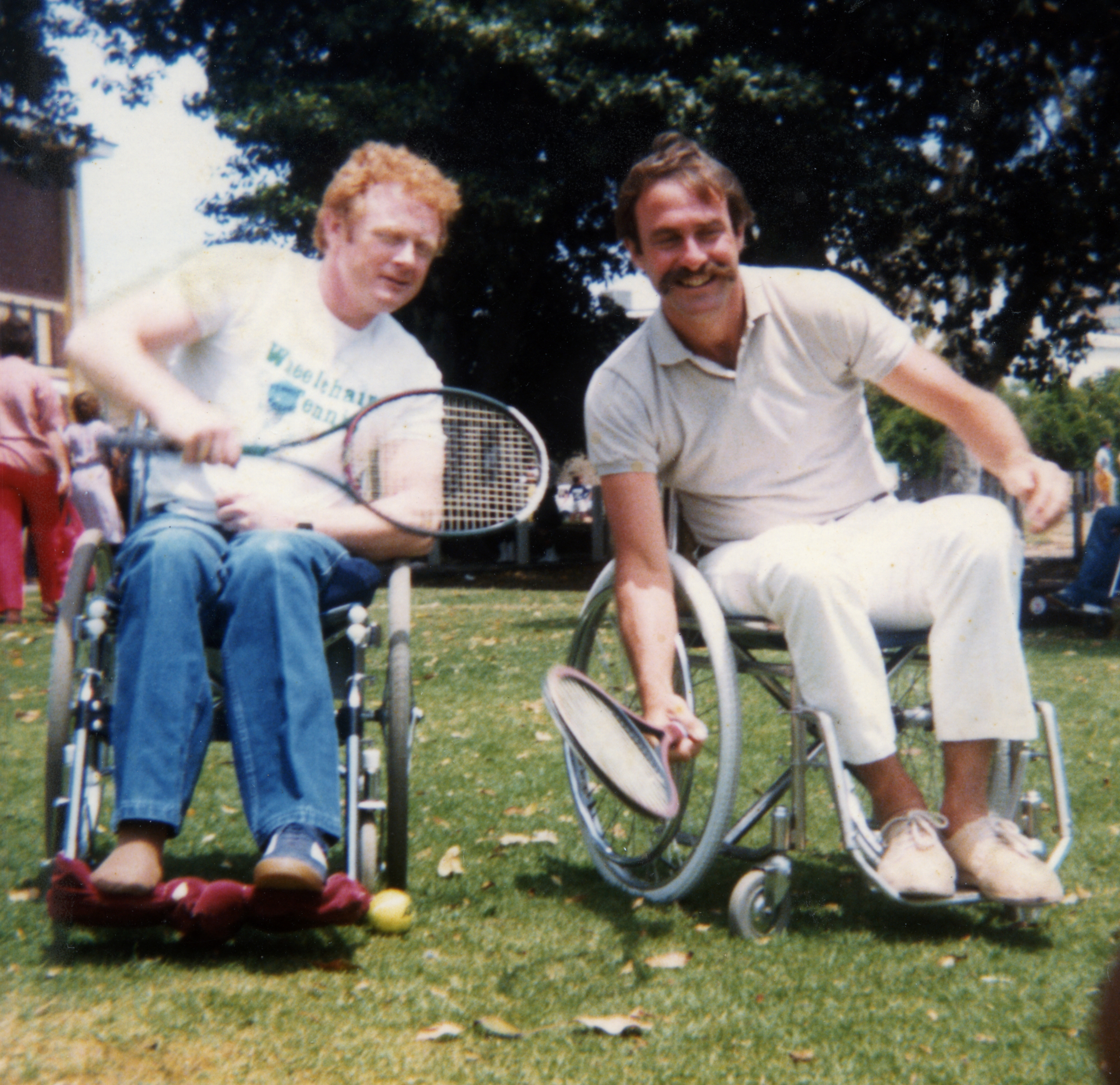
Jeff Simmonds and Grand Slam tennis champion John Newcombe open the 1982 "Para Fun Day" at St Leonards Park in Sydney to help raise funds for the New South Wales wheelchair tennis association

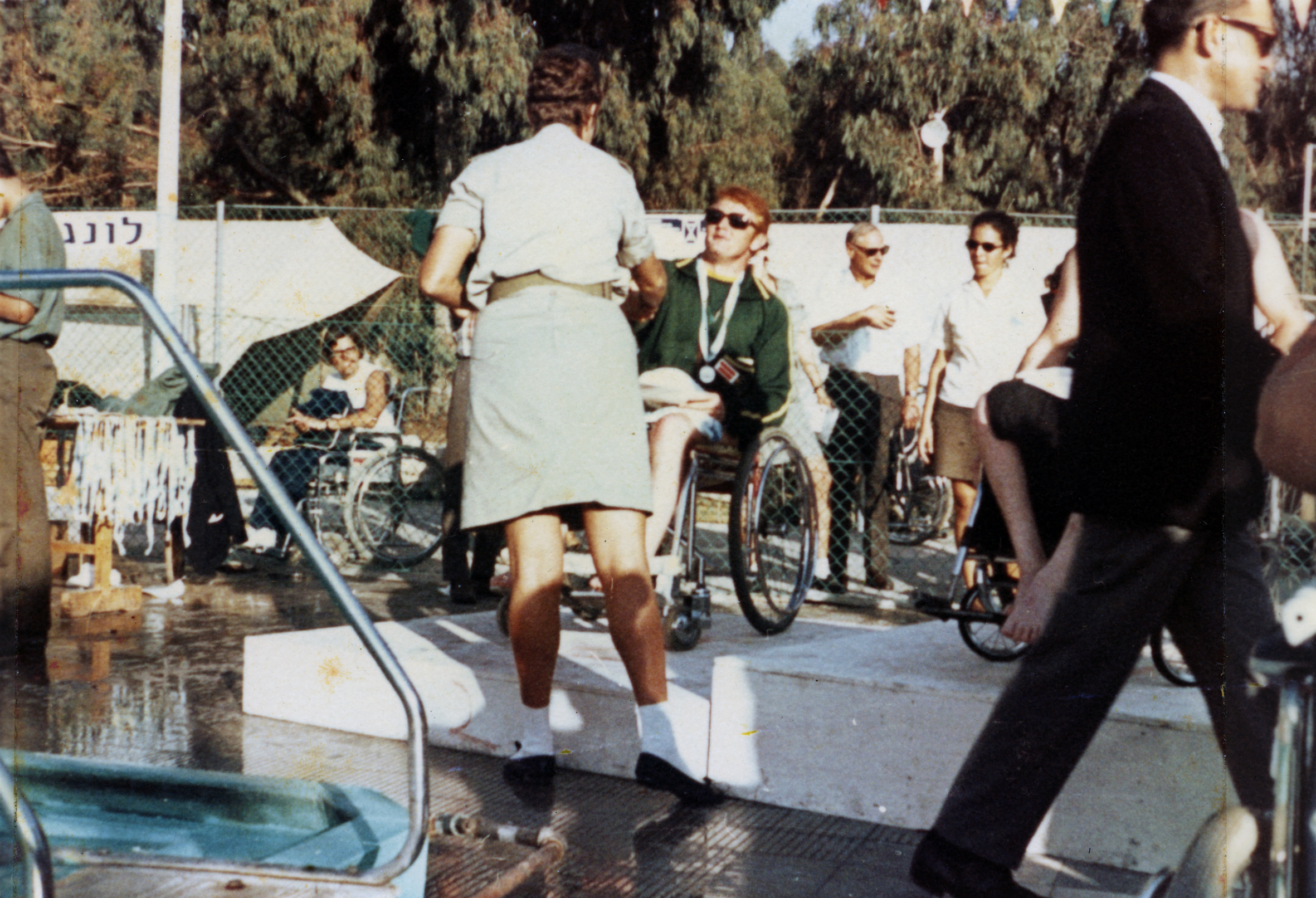
Simmonds receives silver medal at the 1968 Tel Aviv Games.

At the 1968 Australian Paraplegic Games in Perth, he won two gold medals in backstroke and breaststroke. His breaststroke time of 64.1 seconds equalled his Australian record. At the 1968 Tel Aviv Paralympics, he won a silver medal in the Men's 50 m Breaststroke class 3 complete event and narrowly missed out on a bronze medal in backstroke and wheelchair sprint. At the 1970 Commonwealth Paraplegic Games in Edinburgh, he won two bronze medals in breaststroke and backstroke.

In 1983, the Australian Wheelchair Tennis Association selected Simmonds together with nine other wheelchair athletes as linesmen for the 1983 Custom Credit Indoor Tennis Championships. This followed the suggestion of John Newcombe, famous Australian tennis champion. Simmonds, secretary of New South Wales Wheelchair Tennis Association, assured the public that the linesmen would be able to handle John McEnroe and other competitors. Well-known Australian radio announcer John Laws informed the public that "Jeff is one of the tough, no nonsense linesmen Superbrat will encounter at this year's Custom Credit Indoor Championship." According to Newcombe, most linesmen selected were able bodied before their injury, “They have great reflexes and good eyesight and they are involved in the game already so they should make good linesmen”.
