= Northcott Disability Services =

Australian disability organisation

Northcott was established as the New South Wales Society for Crippled Children in 1929 by the Rotary Club of Sydney in response to the growing number of children left with the effects of illnesses such as polio and tuberculosis.

== History ==
Northcott was established in 1929 as the NSW Society for Crippled Children by the Rotary Club of Sydney to provide services for children with disabilities due to polio, tuberculosis and other diseases.

In 1992, the name changed to The NSW Society for Children and Young Adults with Physical Disabilities, and in 1995 to The Northcott Society. Northcott is named in honour of NSW's first Australian-born Governor, Sir John Northcott, who was patron from 1946 to 1957.

On 18 March 1930 the first auxiliary was formed at Killara. Auxiliaries continued to assist the society for many years; the service of the North Shore Auxiliary'se members provided 70 years of dedicated support.

In 1957, Northcott president, Sir Kenneth Coles, held the role of President of the International Society, later Rehabilitation International. Many other organisations started with the support of Northcott. Cerebral Palsy Alliance began in January 1945 with a grant. Muscular Dystrophy Association NSW was founded as an affiliated organisation in 1957.

May Gibbs, creator of the Gumnut Babies, Snugglepot and Cuddlepie, bequeathed 50% of her royalties, from the designs of her bush characters, to Northcott in 1969 when she died.

In 1997, the National Library of Australia awarded Northcott a Community Heritage Grant that enabled the organisation to house a collection of historical papers and memorabilia.

In 2003, Ability First Australia was formed, being a national body of not-for-profits in a strategic alliance of 14 of Australia's leading disability service providers, of which Northcott has been a part since its creation. Member organisations are in all states and territories.

In November 2017 Northcott acquired 109 group homes, respite homes and specialist supported living services from the NSW Department of Family and Community Services (FACS).

== Description ==
Northcott is a not-for-profit disability service provider. It provides services from metropolitan and regional locations throughout New South Wales and Australian Capital Territory. It is a registered National Disability Insurance Scheme (NDIS) provider. Today, Northcott helps more than 13,000 children and adults with disabilities, their families and carers across NSW and the ACT, providing more than 100 services and programs.

Northcott's purpose is to build an inclusive society. This is achieved by assisting people with disabilities to develop their skills, achieve their goals - including their potential for independence and ability to participate in their communities.

Northcott provides services from 31 sites across metropolitan, regional and rural NSW. There are offices in regional NSW including; Coffs Harbour, Dubbo, Moree, Oak Flats, Penrith, Queanbeyan, Tamworth, Casula, Ballina, Mayfield, Campbelltown, Wyong, Hornsby, Mona Vale and Wagga Wagga.
