= Tony South =

Australian Paralympic archer and table tennis player

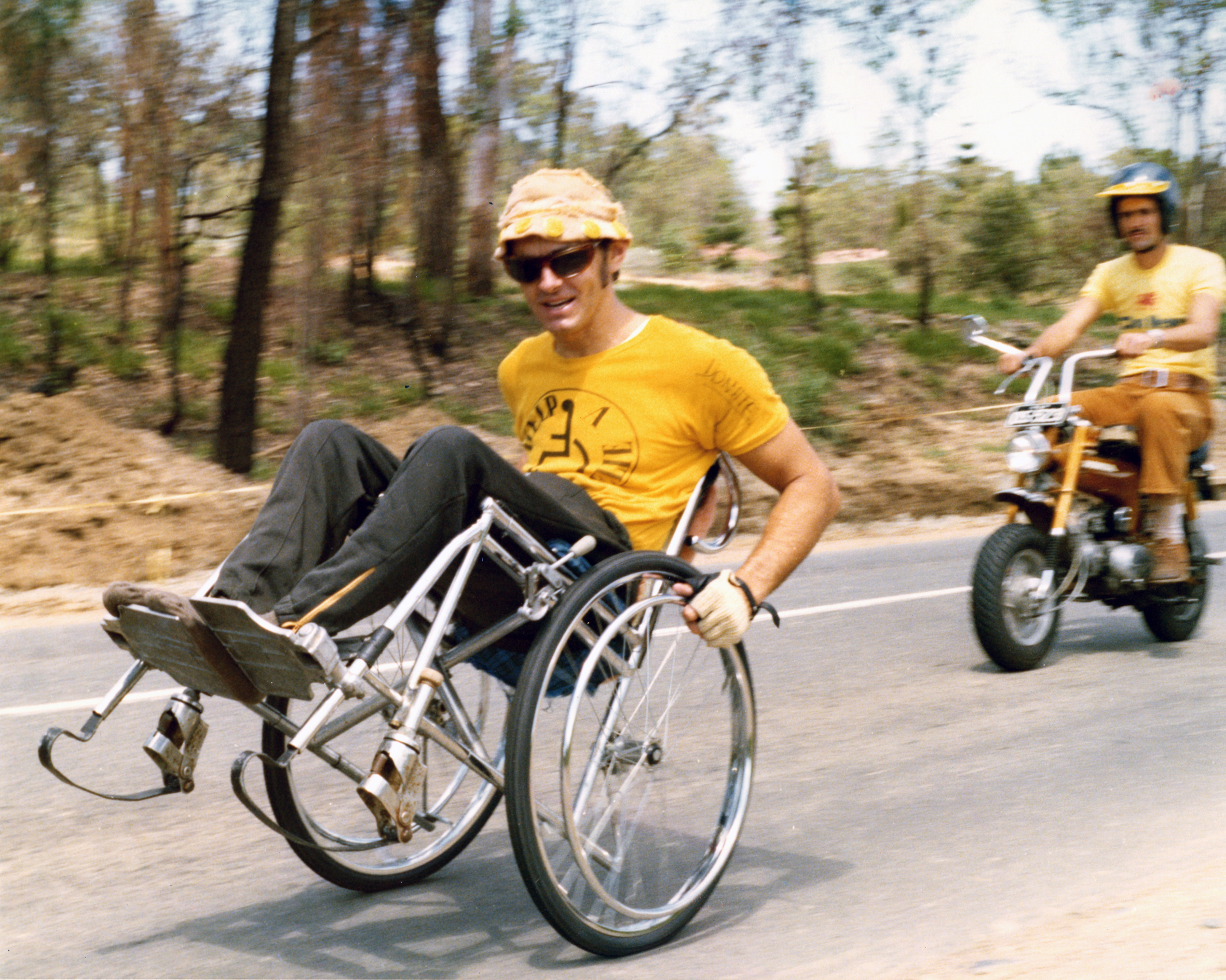
- Tony South pushed 50km on his back wheels in 1975 to raise funds for the Australian Paraplegic Games.

Personal information
- Full name: Anthony Eric South
- Nationality: Australia
- Born: 1944 (age 81–82)
- Died: April 2024 Parkinson, Queensland
Medal record
Archery
Paralympic Games
Gold medal – first place	1968 Tel Aviv	Men's Albion Round open
Silver medal – second place	1968 Tel Aviv	Men's FITA Round open
Bronze medal – third place	1972 Heidelberg	Men's FITA Round Team open
Dartchery
Paralympic Games
Silver medal – second place	1968 Tel Aviv	Mixed Pairs open

Anthony Eric South OAM AM (1944–2024) was an Australian Paralympic archer who won a gold medal and two silver medals at the 1968 Summer Paralympics and a bronze medal at the 1972 Summer Paralympics.

== Personal ==
South was born in 1944. He became a wheelchair-using paraplegic after a gunshot wound at the age of ten. His mother was advised to admit him to a nursing home, but South decided to be strong in the face of adversity.

After the accident, South's rehabilitation program was prepared by Mrs Kingston, Chief Physiotherapist at Northcott, Parramatta, New South Wales and included the sport of archery which was the first sport introduced to paraplegics by Ludwig Guttmann. Archery helped the development of muscles in South's back.

High school education studies prevented South from competing at the 1960 Summer Paralympics and the 1962 Commonwealth Paraplegic Games. He passed his Intermediate Certificate and was the first student in a wheelchair in New South Wales to attend a public high school. He was the first student from Northcott to obtain the Leaving Certificate and achieved an Honours Grade in Economics and Commonwealth University Scholarship. His tertiary studies were completed at the Marconi School of Wireless, and after graduating, he joined IBM Australia where he was employed for 28 years.

Tony died in April 2024, in Parkinson, QLD.

== Career ==
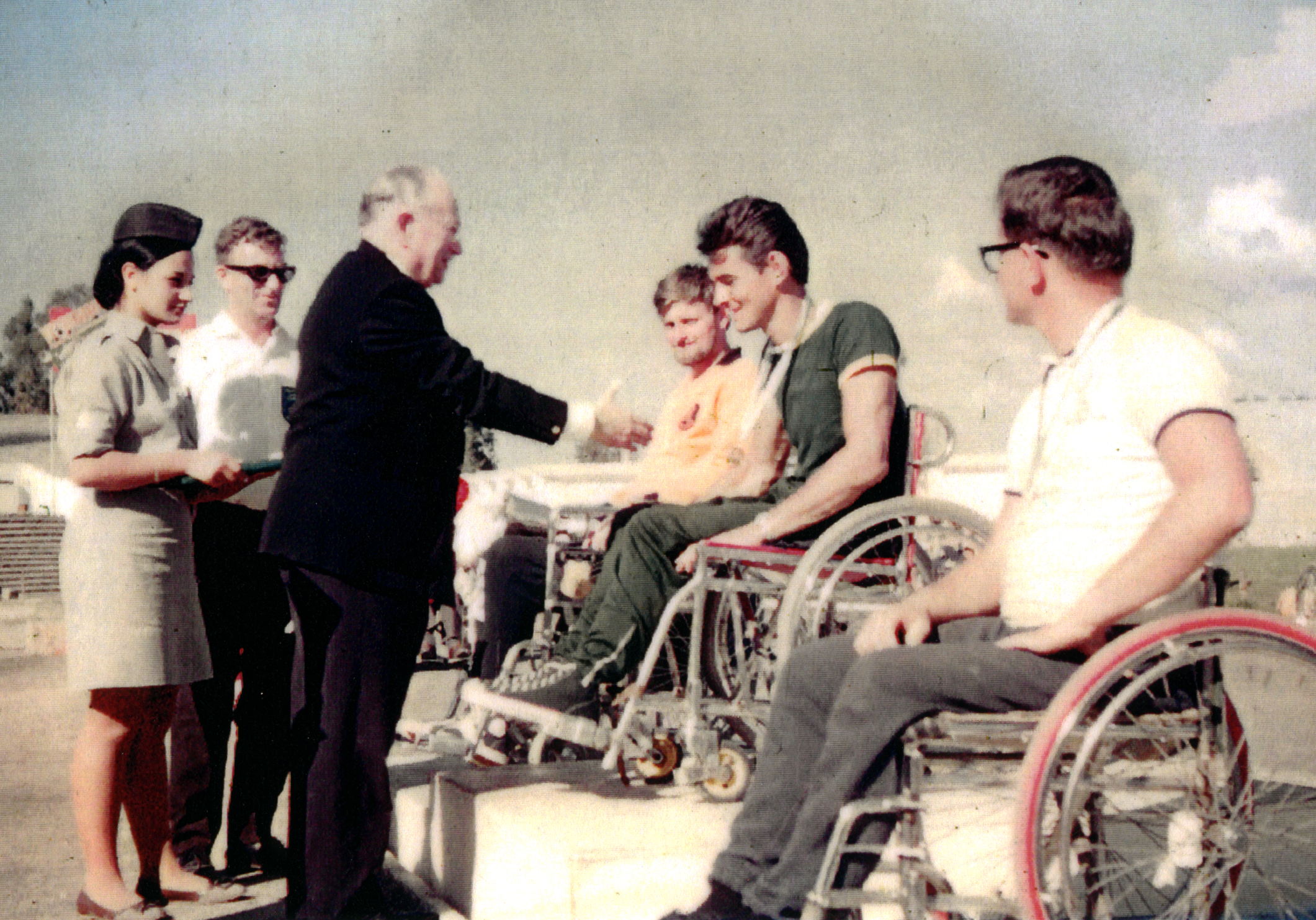
Tony South receives his gold medal in Tel Aviv from Ludwig Guttman, founder of the Paralympic movement.

At 17 years of age, while competing in his first Australian Paraplegic Championship in Melbourne, Victoria, he won his first gold medal in archery, South's physiotherapy program was extended to 26 hours a week in preparation for the 1968 Tel Aviv Paralympics, his first international games competition. He achieved world championship status in the sport of archery by winning one gold and two silver medals 1968 Tel Aviv Games. During the five-day Games, that required being on the field for 45 hours, he won one gold medal in the Men's Albion Round Open Archery event with the World Paraplegic Record score of 800, a shoot of 80, 60 and 50 metes, one of three events that involved shooting 1000 arrows,. He won two silver medals in the Men's FITA Round Open Archery and in Dartchery Mixed Pairs open event with Australian archer Alan Conn. He also competed in table tennis events.

At the 1970 Commonwealth Paraplegic Games, Edinburgh, Scotland, he won one gold, one silver and one bronze medal in archery and wheelchair slalom.

At the 1972 Heidelberg Paralympics, he won a bronze medal in the Men's FITA Round Team open and finished fifteenth in the Men's FITA Round open .

In 1974, South moved to Queensland and became President of Queensland Paraplegic and Quadriplegic Sports Committee, where he raised $14,000.00 towards the cost of hosting the 4th National Paraplegic Games, Brisbane, Queensland by pushing 50 kilometres on the back wheels of his chair

South noted that Australian athletes had to train individually with strong competition held only every 2 years - Australian Championships, the biggest drawback, having to raise their own finances which caused much loss of training. Observing that there was little support for people with spinal injuries, South joined the Paraplegic Benefit Fund Australia (PBF), founded by Sir George Bedbrook in 1984.

During an interview with Richard Fidler, Australian Broadcasting Corporation, South informed listeners that PBF was there to help physically, and after that, hopefully motivationally. South was invited to speak to staff and guests of the Marketing Department, Trilby Misso Lawyers at their Inspirational Speakers Series 2009, the 100 attendees were very impressed with his credentials.

During a visit to Townsville in Northern Queensland, South discussed the cause and effect of preventable accidents that result in spinal cord injury with nine Rotary clubs, three local government councils, and attended meetings with twelve other prominent community leaders. Northern Queensland has the highest per capita rate of spinal injury.

South, PBF's Corporate Relations Officer in 2006, attended the Queensland Invitational Wheelchair Rugby Championships and presented the award of 'most valuable player' (to outstanding individuals only) to Australian Wheelchair Rugby player Ryley Batt.

In 2014, South, together with other PBF team members, introduced State and Federal Politicians to the mission of the PBF and familiarized them with the work of the organization. Later, he met with members from 1995 and explained how helpful the PBF's $100,000 Spinal Cord Injury Member Benefit was to each member.

== Recognition ==
- 1986 - Queensland Disabled Achiever of the Year
- 1992 - Medal of the Order of Australia OAM - for service to the people with a disability and to disadvantaged groups;
- 2008 - Member of the Order of Australia AM - for service to the community as a campaigner for people with a disability and through contributions to the development of spinal injury prevention and research programs
