= Kevin Munro =

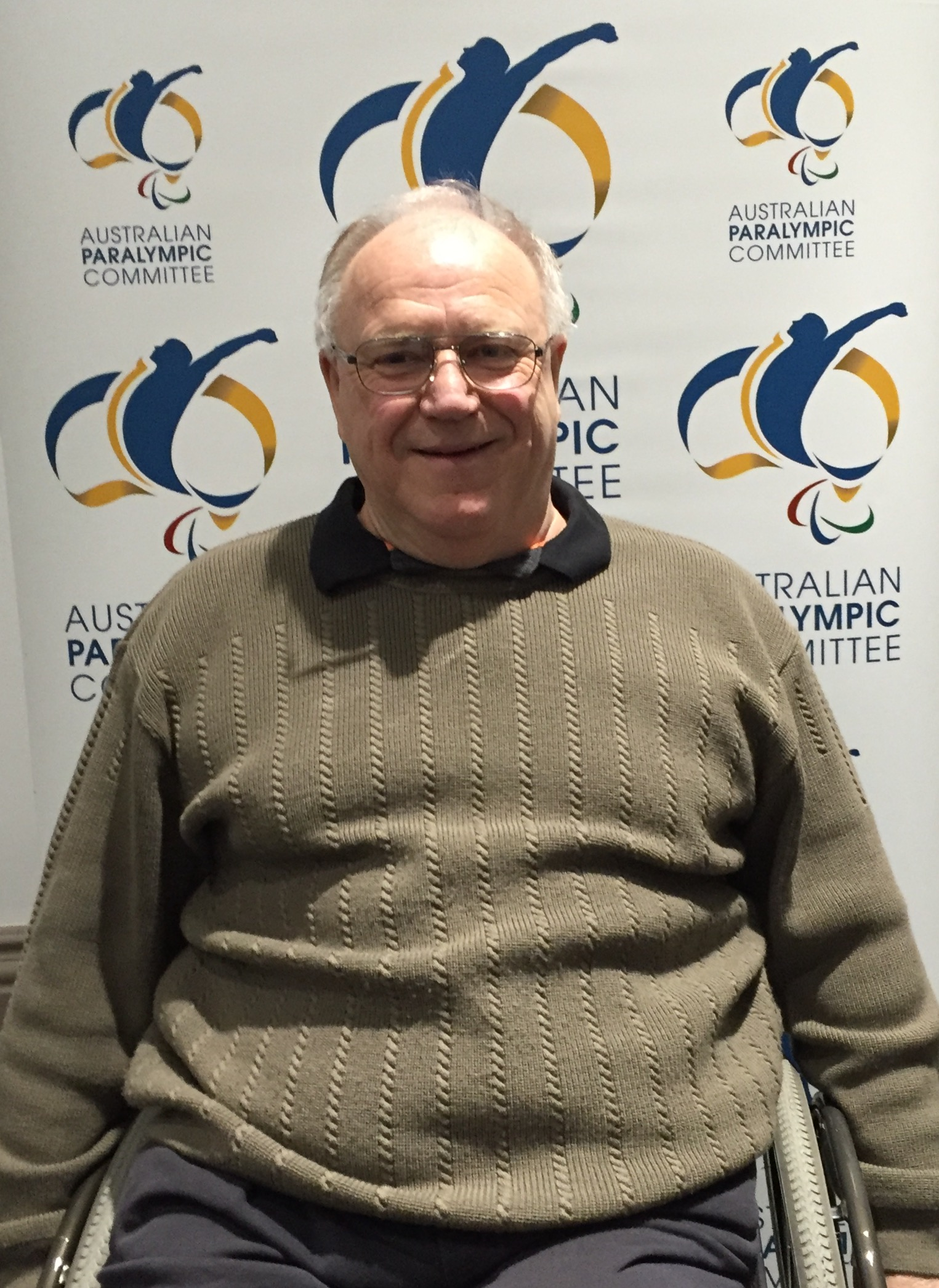

Personal information
- Nationality: Australia
- Born: 19 May 1950 (age 76) Port Pirie, South Australia
Medal record
Athletics
Paralympic Games
| Gold medal – first place | 1968 Tel Aviv | Men's 100 m Wheelchair B |
| Silver medal – second place | 1968 Tel Aviv | Men's 4x40 m Relay open |

Kevin Munro is an Australian Paralympic athlete and wheelchair basketballer. At the 1968 Tel Aviv Games, he won a gold medal in the Men's 100 m Wheelchair B event and a silver medal in the Men's 4x40 m Relay open event.

== Personal ==
Munro was born in Port Pirie, South Australia on 19 May 1950 and was partly paralysed from birth. He attended Port Pirie Primary School and Nailsworth Technical High School. In 1966, cartilage was removed from his left leg and with the right leg totally incapacitated, his hopes of receiving special equipment from the US, that would enable him to be independent of the wheelchair, did not come to fruition. He lived at the Northfield Wards, Royal Adelaide Hospital, and drove his own adapted car to work each day where he was employed as a tool maker by trade. In 1971, at 20 years of age, Munro started work as a contract binder at the Royal Society for the Blind, South Australia, and was promoted to Coordinator of Packaging and Assembly, where he continues to work to this day.

== Career ==
At the 1966 Border Games, the paraplegic sporting event of the year for wheelchair athletes, held in Mount Gambier South Australia, Munro became known as the fastest man in a wheelchair after he defeated defending champion Paralympian Bruno Moretti in the A Grade 50 yard (metre) dash, and the A Grade 110 yard (metre) Championships, with a time of 23 seconds. At the Australian Paraplegic Games, held in Perth in 1968, he set a new world record for the half-mile wheelchair race with a time of 3 minutes 59 seconds.

At eighteen years of age, he won a gold medal and set a world record for the 100 metre wheelchair sprint (21.7 seconds), at the 1968 Tel Aviv Games. His Australian time of 20 seconds was not recognized as a world record due to the incorrect number of time watches used. A member of the 160 metre relay team, he won a silver medal at the same Games. At the South Australian's Sportsman's Association's Annual Lindy Awards, 1968, Munro was recognized for his outstanding achievements in Paralympic sports and in overcoming his disability. That same year he held the Australian Paraplegic records for Club and Discus throwing, and middleweight Weightlifting.

Munro was selected to represent South Australia at the First FESPIC Games, Oita, Japan in 1975.

At the 1980 Arnhem Games, he participated in the Men's 100 m 4- event and in the Australia men's national wheelchair basketball team.

In June 2013, Munro joined other South Australian members of the 1968 Australian Paralympics Team to relive memories as part of the Australian Paralympic Committee history project. The 1968 Paralympic Games were the first Games where South Australian athletes had been selected to represent Australia.
