= Disability Recreation and Sports SA =

- Abbreviation: DRaSSA
- Formation: 1982
- Purpose: Promotion of disabled athletes
- Location: Australia

The Disability Recreation and Sports SA (DRaSSA) was created in 1982 (44 years ago). Prior to the creation of the DRaSSA, it was a subcommittee of the Paraplegic and Quadriplegic Association of South Australia. The organization was first called the Paraplegic and Quadriplegic Sports Association of South Australia. In 1987, Australian sport organizations around the country were trying to standardize their names. The organization changed its name to Wheelchair Sports SA. In 2013, it changed its name to Disability Recreation and Sports SA.

The organization strives to support people with a disability to lead active, healthy lives through participation in recreation, fitness and sport. DRS helps connect people with opportunities, assisting individuals to locate recreational activities most suitable to them, this individual support approach enables our members to engage in recreational opportunities according to several key criteria including location, age, gender and type of disability.

Some of the key features and offerings of DRSSA may include: adaptive sports programs, recreational activities, equipment loan program, training and education, advocacy and support.

The association is recognized by and is responsible for answering to the South Australia State Government and Department of Recreation and Sport.

== See also ==
- Australia at the Paralympics
- Australian Paralympic Swim Team
- Disability rights in Australia
- Parasports

== Bibliography ==
- Wheelchair Sports Association of South Australia (1995). "Wheelchair Sports Association 1994 Annual Report". Northfield, South Australia: Wheelchair Sports Association of South Australia.
