= Susan Davies (Paralympian) =

Australian Paralympic archer

Personal information
- Nationality: Australia
Medal record
Archery
Paralympic Games
Bronze medal – third place	1984 New York/Stoke Mandeville	Women's Double FITA Round Paraplegic

Susan Davies is an Australian Paralympic archery medalist.

She attended Brisbane Girls Grammar School. In 1970, a car accident left her a paraplegic. Five years after the accident, she took up archery as part of her physiotherapy. She explained that " it was mainly to help me get balance in a wheelchair. When you sever your spinal cord you have no sensation of where you are sitting or if you are sitting for a start". She practised in her Mount Gravatt back garden and at the Belmont Range in Brisbane. In 1984, she worked part-time as an accountant for the University of Queensland.

She competed at the 1980 Arnhem Games and came 6th in the Women's Double FITA Round Paralplegic. At the 1984 Stoke Mandeville Games, she won a bronze medal in the Women's Double FITA Round Paraplegic.
