= Kevin Bawden =

Australian Paralympic competitor

Personal information
- Full name: Kevin Wayne Bawden
- Nationality: Australia
- Born: 9 November 1946
- Died: 17 August 2026 (aged 79) Adelaide, South Australia
Medal record
Shooting
Commonwealth Paraplegic Games
| Gold medal – first place | 1974 Dunedin | Smallbore Rifle |

Kevin Wayne Bawden AM (9 November 1946 - 17 August 2026) was an Australian Paralympics competitor in six sports and a leading disability sports administrator in Australia.

== Personal ==
Bawden was born on 9 November 1946 and lived in Adelaide, South Australia. He contracted polio at the age of four and at the age of 18 became involved in sport. He was employed with the Australian Government in several management roles for thirty five years until in 2001. From 2001 to 2006, he was the chief executive officer of a not-for-profit organisation in Adelaide.

== Sports career ==
Bawden participated in four Summer Paralympics, three as an athlete and one as an official and coach. At the 1968 Tel Aviv Games, he participated in archery, dartchery, lawn bowls, table tennis, wheelchair basketball and wheelchair fencing. At these Games, South Australian wheelchair athletes represented Australia for the first time. He participated in shooting, table tennis and wheelchair basketball at the 1976 Toronto Games. At the 1984 Stoke Mandeville Games, he participated in shooting. He was a wheelchair sports official and assistant basketball coach at the 1988 Seoul Games. Bawden won a gold medal in the Smallbore Rifle at the 1974 Commonwealth Paraplegic Games in Dunedin, New Zealand. He participated at the FESPIC Games.

He represented South Australia at twelve National Championships for wheelchair athletes.

== Sports administration ==
At age 19, Bawden established Wheelchair Sports Association of South Australia. He was President of the Association for 28 years. He was Chairman of the inaugural National Junior Disability Games. At these Games, the Kevin Bawden Shield recognised his enormous contribution to junior disability sport. He was awarded Member of the Order of Australia for his contribution to disability sport. Australia's greatest Paralympic shooter, Libby Kosmala states that Bawden played a role in her initial involvement in shooting.

== Recognition ==
- 1985 – The Lord's Taverners Award – recognition of individuals who make a significant contribution to junior wheelchair sport in Australia
- 1986 – Sir Ludwig Guttmann Award – recognition of individuals who make significant contribution to wheelchair sport in Australia.
- 1995 – Order of Australia (AM) – in recognition of service to people with physical disabilities, particularly as President of the Wheelchair Sports Association of SA
- 2000 – Australian Sports Medal
- Two awards are named in honour of Bawden – Disability Recreation & Sports SA (formerly Wheelchair Sports SA) Kevin Bawden AM Encouragement Award and Kevin Bawden Shield awarded to the State with the highest average points per athlete the National Junior Games for the Disabled.
