= Alan Conn =

Australian Paralympic archer and table tennis player

Personal information
- Nationality: Australia
Medal record
Archery
Paralympic Games
Gold medal – first place	1968 Tel Aviv	Men's Columbia Round open
Bronze medal – third place	1972 Heidelberg	Men's FITA Round Team open
Dartchery
Paralympic Games
Silver medal – second place	1968 Tel Aviv	Mixed Pairs open

Alan Conn is an Australian Paralympian archer and table tennis player from New South Wales. He had an accident at 18 on his motorcycle that led to him becoming paraplegic. At the 1968 Tel Aviv Games, he won a gold medal in the Men's Columbia Round open archery event, with a world record score of 618, and a silver medal in the Mixed Pairs open dartchery event. He also competed but did not win a medal in the Men's Doubles B table tennis event. At the time of the Games, he was 24 years old, and working as a shoe maker for the Commonwealth rehabilitation artificial limb plant. He started competing in archery three years before the Games. At the 1972 Heidelberg Games, he won a bronze medal in the Men's FITA Round Team open.
