= Wheelchair basketball at the 1968 Summer Paralympics =

Wheelchair basketball at the III Paralympic Games
- Paralympic Wheelchair Basketball

Medalists
1st place, gold medalist(s)		Israel (ISR) (men); Israel (ISR) (women)
2nd place, silver medalist(s)		United States (USA) (men); Argentina (ARG) (women)
3rd place, bronze medalist(s)		Great Britain (GBR) (men); United States (USA) (women)

Wheelchair basketball at the 1968 Summer Paralympics consisted of men's and women's team events.

The original wheelchair basketball classification system in 1966 had 5 classes: A, B, C, D, S. Each class was worth so many points. A was worth 1, B and C were worth 2. D and S were worth 3 points. A team could have a maximum of 12 points on the floor. This system was the one in place for the 1968 Summer Paralympics. Class A was for T1-T9 complete. Class B was for T1-T9 incomplete. Class C was for T10-L2 complete. Class D was for T10-L2 incomplete. Class S was for Cauda equina paralysis.

== Medal summary ==
Event	Gold	Silver	Bronze
Men's team	Israel (ISR) Aryeh Beizam; Jacob Ben-Arie; Zvi Ben-Zvi; Shmuel Ben-Zakai; Israel Even-Zahav; Yitzhak Galitzki; Aryeh Gantz; Israel Globus; Baruch Hagai; Avraham Keftelovitch; Zvi Potashnik; Danny Shahar (captain); Avraham Tshuva; Amnon Weiss; Coach: Reuven Heller	United States (USA) Kim Pollock	Great Britain (GBR)
Women's team	Israel (ISR) Ruth Biton; Michal Escapa; Neora Even-Zahav; Malka Halfon; Ayala Malhan; Mali Mezin; Batia Mishani; Zipora Rubin-Rosenbaum (captain); Shoshana Sharabi; Batia Shweiki; Geula Siri	Argentina (ARG) Silvia Cochetti; Estela Fernández; Dina Galíndez; Susana Masciotra; Amelia Mier; Susana Olarte; Noemí Tortul	United States (USA)

Source: Paralympic.org

== See also ==
- Basketball at the 1968 Summer Olympics
