= Israel at the 1964 Summer Paralympics =

- IPC code: ISR
- NPC: Israel Paralympic Committee
- Website: www.isad.org.il

in Tokyo
- Competitors: 20 in 5 sports
- Medals Ranked 7thth: Gold 7 Silver 3 Bronze 13 Total 23

Summer Paralympics appearances (overview)
- 1960; 1964; 1968; 1972; 1976; 1980; 1984; 1988; 1992; 1996; 2000; 2004; 2008; 2012; 2016; 2020; 2024

Israel participated in the 1964 Summer Paralympics in Tokyo. 20 Israeli athletes won seven gold medals, three silver and eleven bronze, enabling their country to finish 7th on the medal table.

== Delegation ==
The Israeli delegation was composed of ten IDF veterans and ten athletes of the Israel Sports Center for the Disabled. Other excelling athletes were banned from participating due to indecent behavior. The delegation was headed by Mr. Arieh Fink, head of the rehabilitation department of the Israel Ministry of Defense, and accompanied by Mr. Gershon Huberman, director of the Israel Sports Center for the Disabled. Further members of the delegation were basketball coaches Shimon Shelah and Jacob Hendelsman, Mrs. Edna Medalia and two medical nurses.

In the 1964 Summer Paralympic Games, Israel participated for the first time in the weightlifting field, following Shalom Dlugatch's achievement of criteria by breaking the previous Paralympics' record. Delegation member Israel Even-Sahav was the sole athlete, of all participating states, asked to take part in rehearsals to the opening ceremony.

The delegation's travel expenses were divided in accordance with its composition: The IDF veterans were sponsored by the Ministry of Defense, sports organizations, the Olympic Committee and the athletes themselves, while the Center's athletes were sponsored by Japanese parties, most prominently by businessman Saul Eisenberg.

The eldest member of the delegation was Michael Ben-Naftali (40) and the youngest Jacob Ben-Arie (14). Israel was ranked 7th on the medal table, winning seven gold medals, three silver and 11 bronze and achieving three world records.

== The wrong reports ==
Since at the dawn of the Paralympic Games there was no precision in reporting the results of the competitions, the Israeli athlete Michal Escapa was indicated with the Italian nationality and without prename (and so she is mentioned in the International Paralympic Committee of the Italian Paralympic Committee web sites) for the reports of the Swimming at the 1964 Summer Paralympics where she won two bronze medals, simply reported as Escapa and not as Michal Escapa. However, as can be seen from a 1968 Israeli newspaper reporting an interview with the athlete, she was the same athlete who had won medals in swimming and table tennis in Tokyo 1964.

== Medalists ==
Medal	Name	Sport	Event	Date
Gold	Batia Mishani	Athletics	Javelin	-
Gold	Zipora Rosenbaum	Athletics	Shot Put	-
Gold	Jacob Ben-Arie	Swimming	25 m breaststroke	-
Gold	Baruch Hagai	Swimming	50 m breaststroke	-
Gold	Batia Mishani	Swimming	50 m freestyle	-
Gold	Baruch Hagai	Table Tennis	singles	-
Gold	Shalom Dlugatch	Weightlifting	-	-
Silver	Avraham Keftelovitch	Swimming	50 m breaststroke	-
Silver	Zipora Rosenbaum	Swimming	50 m freestyle	-
Silver	Batia Mishani	Table Tennis	singles	-
Bronze	Batia Mishani	Athletics	Shot Put	-
Bronze	Zipora Rosenbaum	Athletics	Discus Throw	-
Bronze	Zipora Rosenbaum	Athletics	Javelin	-
Bronze	Avraham Keftelovitch	Swimming	50 m freestyle	-
Bronze	Jacob Ben-Arie, Baruch Hagai and Avraham Keftelovitch	Swimming	mixed medley relay open	-
Bronze	Michal Escapa	Swimming	25 m freestyle prone incomplete class 2	-
Bronze	Michal Escapa	Swimming	25 m breaststroke incomplete class 2	-
Bronze	Men team	Wheelchair Basketball	Group A	-
Bronze	Men team	Wheelchair Basketball	Group B	-
Bronze	Michal Escapa	Table Tennis	singles	-
Bronze	Joseph Sharav	Table Tennis	singles	-
Bronze	Baruch Hagai and Yitzhak Galitzki	Table Tennis	doubles	-
Bronze	Batia Mishani and Zipora Rosenbaum	Table Tennis	doubles	-

== Athletes ==
- IDF veterans:
1. Michael Ben-Naftali
2. Shmuel Ben-Zakai
3. Zvi Ben-Zvi
4. Reuven Hebron
5. Simcha Lustig
6. Menachem Morba
7. Avraham Mushraki
8. Joseph Sharav
9. Yoel Singer
10. Dan Wagner
- Israel Sports Center for the Disabled representatives:
1. Jacob Ben-Arie
2. Shalom Dlugatch
3. Michal Escapa
4. Israel Even-Sahav
5. Yitzhak Galitzki
6. Israel Globus
7. Baruch Hagai
8. Avraham Keftelovitch
9. Batia Mishani
10. Zipora Rosenbaum
