= Athletics at the 1968 Summer Paralympics =

Paralympic sport

Athletics at the III Paralympic Games
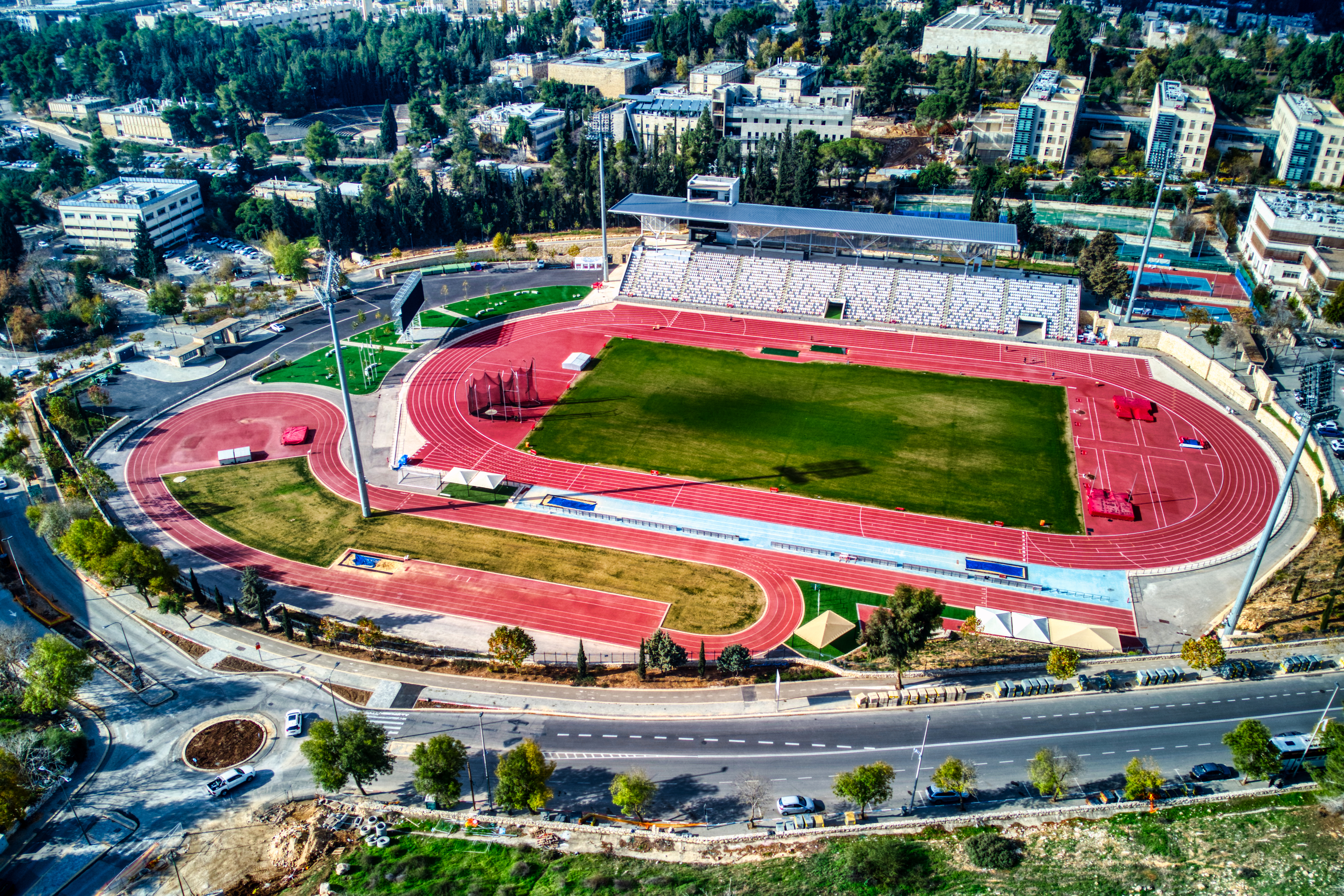
- Host stadium (shown in 2023)
- Dates: 5–13 November 1968
- Competitors: 423 from 26 nations

Athletics at the 1968 Summer Paralympics consisted of 70 events, 35 for men and 35 for women.

== Participating nations ==
- Argentina (18)
- Australia (22)
- Austria (20)
- Belgium (10)
- Canada (22)
- Ethiopia (2)
- Finland (2)
- France (12)
- Great Britain (33)
- India (9)
- Ireland (2)
- Israel (26)
- Italy (22)
- Jamaica (7)
- Japan (38)
- Malta (6)
- Netherlands (14)
- New Zealand (12)
- Norway (8)
- Rhodesia (7)
- South Africa (8)
- South Korea (2)
- Spain (5)
- Switzerland (16)
- United States (61)
- West Germany (39)

== Medal table ==
Rank	Nation	Gold	Silver	Bronze	Total
1	United States (USA)	16	11	16	43
2	Israel (ISR)*	9	11	12	32
3	Argentina (ARG)	9	8	8	25
4	Australia (AUS)	7	7	5	19
5	South Africa (RSA)	5	7	4	16
6	Great Britain (GBR)	5	5	4	14
7	Italy (ITA)	5	4	5	14
8	Canada (CAN)	5	4	3	12
9	West Germany (FRG)	3	5	2	10
10	Jamaica (JAM)	2	0	0	2
11	Japan (JPN)	1	2	5	8
12	Rhodesia (RHO)	1	1	2	4
13	New Zealand (NZL)	1	1	1	3
14	France (FRA)	1	0	0	1
15	Austria (AUT)	0	4	2	6
16	Ireland (IRL)	0	0	1	1
Totals (16 entries)		70	70	70	210

== Medal summary ==
=== Men's events ===
Event	Gold	Silver	Bronze
Novices 60 m wheelchair dash A	Patterson; Canada	Walter Hertle; West Germany	Mitsuaki Sakonju; Japan
Novices 60 m wheelchair dash B	Wilson; Canada	Hans Jung; West Germany	Bourne; Canada
Novices 60 m wheelchair dash C	Ariel Roman; United States	Walter Dann; Canada	Richard Feltes; United States
100 m wheelchair A	Gary Hooper; Australia	Bruno Moretti; Australia	Dick Thompson; Great Britain
100 m wheelchair B	Kevin Munro; Australia	David Williamson; United States	Johann Schuhbauer; West Germany
100 m wheelchair C	Gary Odorowski; United States	Denver Branum; United States	Taketoshi Miyazawa; Japan
4×40 m relay open	United States (USA); Denver Branum; Chess; Gary Odorowski; Ariel Roman	Australia (AUS); Gary Hooper; John Martin; Bruno Moretti; Kevin Munro	Argentina (ARG); Carlos Carranza; Jorge Diz; Hugo Loto; Bautista Rubio
Club throw A	Vic Renalson; Australia	Daniel Erasmus; South Africa	Antonio Arizzi; Italy
Club throw B	Eugene Reimer; Canada	David Williamson; United States	Nel; South Africa
Club throw C	H. Smith; United States	Germano Pecchenino; Italy	Emilio Porto; Italy
Club throw D	Roberto Marson; Italy	Neault; Canada	Horst Gotthelf; West Germany
Club throw special class	Ed Owen; United States	Jorge Diz; Argentina	Cameron; United States
Discus throw A	Vic Renalson; Australia	Daniel Erasmus; South Africa	Antonio Arizzi; Italy
Discus throw B	Eugene Reimer; Canada	Germishuizen; South Africa	J. Meyer; South Africa
Discus throw C	Yitzhak Galitzki; Israel	H. Smith; United States	Arballo; United States
Discus throw D	Roberto Marson; Italy	Israel Even-Sahav; Israel	Amnon Weiss; Israel
Discus throw special class	Ed Owen; United States	Demorest; United States	Miguel Ángel González; Argentina
Javelin throw A	Daniel Erasmus; South Africa	Vic Renalson; Australia	Dick Thompson; Great Britain
Javelin throw B	David Williamson; United States	Eugene Reimer; Canada	J. Meyer; South Africa
Javelin throw C	Johann Schuhbauer; West Germany	Germano Pecchenino; Italy	Reno Levis; United States
Javelin throw D	Roberto Marson; Italy	Russ Scott; Great Britain	Amnon Weiss; Israel
Javelin throw special class	Miguel Ángel González; Argentina	Cameron; United States	Ed Owen; United States
Precision javelin throw open	Vincent Excell; Jamaica	Engelbert Rangger; Austria	Reno Levis; United States
Shot put A	Daniel Erasmus; South Africa	Goll; Austria	Vic Renalson; Australia
Shot put B	J. Meyer; South Africa	Gary Hooper; Australia	Germishuizen; South Africa
Shot put C	Benincasa; Italy	Johann Schuhbauer; West Germany	Leonard Chrysler; United States
Shot put D	Horst Gotthelf; West Germany	Amnon Weiss; Israel	Roberto Marson; Italy
Shot put special class	Ed Owen; United States	Miguel Ángel González; Argentina	Jorge Diz; Argentina
Slalom A	Bruno Moretti; Australia	Bill Mather-Brown; Australia	Mitsuaki Sakonju; Japan
Slalom B	Robert McIntyre; Australia	John Martin; Australia	Makio Suga; Japan
Slalom C	Hisashi Furukawa; Japan	Mikio Egawa; Japan	Teruyoshi Tsuchiya; Japan
Slalom cervical class	Allan McLucas; Australia	Gianino; United States	Dunn; United States
Pentathlon complete	Johann Schuhbauer; West Germany	Heinz Simon; West Germany	Leslie Manson-Bishop; Rhodesia
Pentathlon incomplete	H. Smith; United States	Clark; Great Britain	Tommy Taylor; Great Britain
Pentathlon special class	Ed Owen; United States	Denver Branum; United States	Jorge Diz; Argentina

=== Women's events ===
Event	Gold	Silver	Bronze
Novices 60 m wheelchair dash A	Thibaut; France	Dina Galindez; Argentina	Lorraine Dodd; Australia
Novices 60 m wheelchair dash B	Hilda Binns; Canada	Janet Swann; Great Britain	Batia Shviki; Israel
Novices 60 m wheelchair dash C	Batia Mishani; Israel	Karin Sammerhofer; Austria	Geula Siri; Israel
60 m wheelchair A	Carol Geisse; United States	Kirn; United States	Cornett; United States
60 m wheelchair B	Valerie Forder; Great Britain	Neora Even-Zahav; Israel	Ora Goldstein; Israel
60 m wheelchair C	Carol Bryant; Great Britain	Jo Ann Keyser; United States	Daphne Hilton; Australia
4×40 m relay open	United States (USA); Ella Chafee; Carol Giesse; Jo Ann Keyser; Linda Stratman	Israel (ISR); Neora Even-Zahav; Batia Mishani; Shoshana Sharabi; Geula Siri	Argentina (ARG); Silvia Cochetti; Amelia Mier; Susana Olarte; Noemi Tortul
Club throw A	Dina Galindez; Argentina	Maggie Marr; Great Britain	Kirn; United States
Club throw B	Hattingh; South Africa	Noemi Tortul; Argentina	Gabriella Monaco; Italy
Club throw C	Susana Olarte; Argentina	Le Roux; South Africa	Seeley; Canada
Club throw D	Zipora Rubin-Rosenbaum; Israel	Batia Mishani; Israel	Shoshana Sharabi; Israel
Club throw special class	Malka Halfon; Israel	Silvia Cochetti; Argentina	Geula Siri; Israel
Discus throw A	Dina Galindez; Argentina	Maggie Marr; Great Britain	Kirn; United States
Discus throw B	Hattingh; South Africa	Noemi Tortul; Argentina	Bindley; United States
Discus throw C	Susana Olarte; Argentina	Le Roux; South Africa	Eve M. Rimmer; New Zealand
Discus throw D	Irene Monaco; Italy	Zipora Rubin-Rosenbaum; Israel	Ruth Biton; Israel
Discus throw special class	Silvia Cochetti; Argentina	Malka Halfon; Israel	Geula Siri; Israel
Javelin throw A	Kirn; United States	Ingrid Voboril; Austria	Galindez; Argentina
Javelin throw B	Rosalie Hixson; United States	Hattingh; South Africa	Noemi Tortul; Argentina
Javelin throw C	Eve M. Rimmer; New Zealand	Gesina Smit; Rhodesia	Seeley; Canada
Javelin throw D	Zipora Rubin-Rosenbaum; Israel	Batia Mishani; Israel	Karin Sammerhofer; Austria
Javelin throw special class	Malka Halfon; Israel	Geula Siri; Israel	Silvia Cochetti; Argentina
Precision javelin throw open	Baracatt; Jamaica	Silvana Martino; Italy	Rosalie Hixson; United States
Shot put A	Kirn; United States	Dina Galindez; Argentina	Ingrid Voboril; Austria
Shot put B	Jacqueline Thompson; Rhodesia	Hattingh; South Africa	Rosalie Hixson; United States
Shot put C	Susana Olarte; Argentina	Eve M. Rimmer; New Zealand	Ora Goldstein; Israel
Shot put D	Zipora Rubin-Rosenbaum; Israel	Batia Mishani; Israel	Avril Davis; Rhodesia
Shot put special class	Silvia Cochetti; Argentina	Malka Halfon; Israel	Geula Siri; Israel
Slalom A	Carol Giesse; United States	Lorraine Dodd; Australia	Cornett; United States
Slalom B	Batia Shviki; Israel	Binns; Canada	Neora Even-Zahav; Israel
Slalom C	Carol Bryant; Great Britain	Kayoko Arai; Japan	Marion O'Brien; Australia
Slalom cervical class	Susana Masciotra; Argentina	Gurman; United States	Rosaleen Gallagher; Ireland
Pentathlon complete	Valerie Forder; Great Britain	Elena Monaco; Italy	Cornett; United States
Pentathlon incomplete	Margaret Gibbs; Great Britain	Marga Floer; West Germany	Carol Bryant; Great Britain
Pentathlon special class	Zipora Rubin-Rosenbaum; Israel	Silvia Cochetti; Argentina	Daphne Hilton; Australia
