= Neora Even-Zahav =

Istraeli Paralympic multi-sport athlete

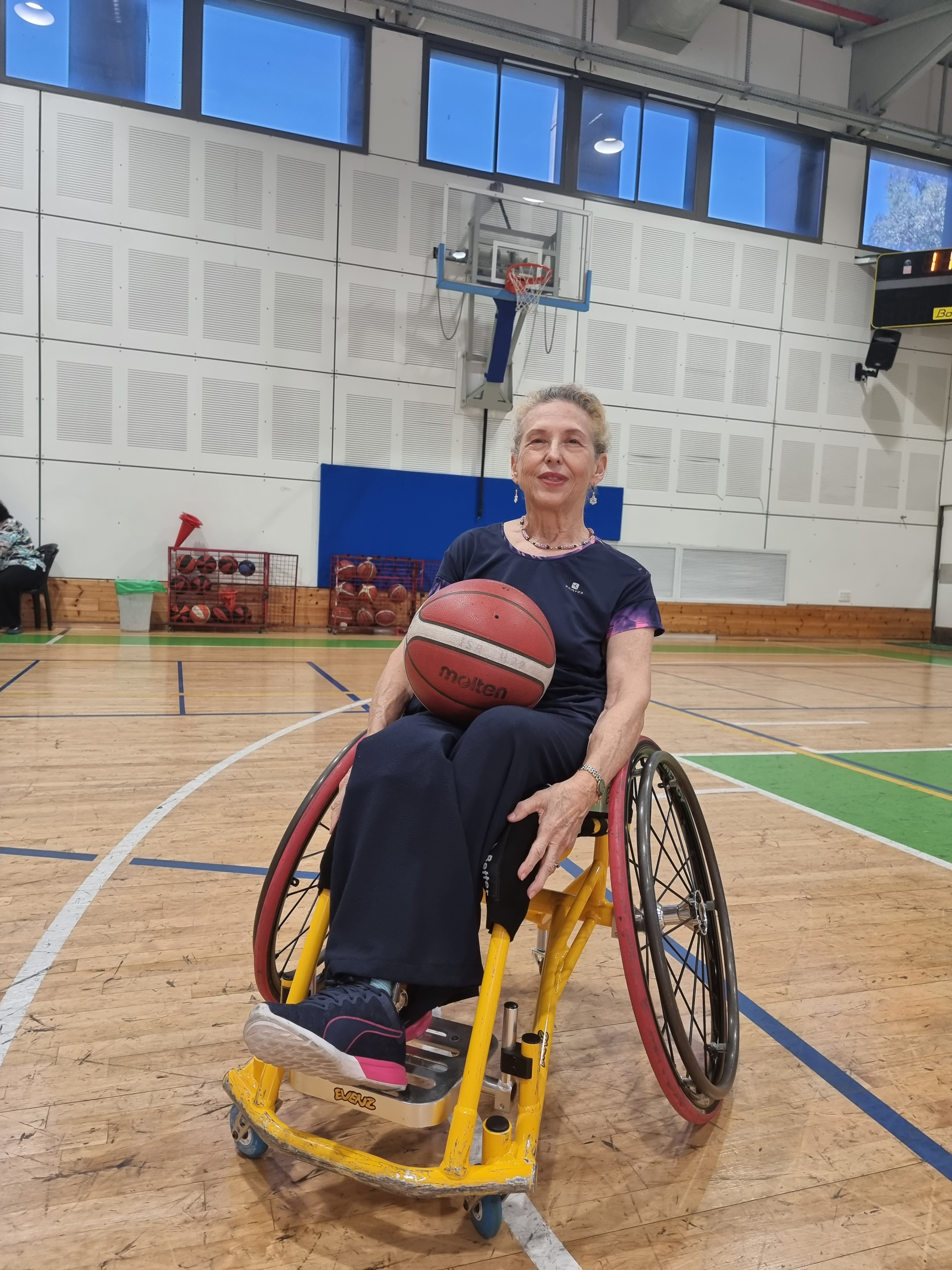

Personal information
- Native name: נאורה אבן-זהב
- National team: Israel
- Born: 11 October 1947 Bucharest, Romania

Sport
- Country: Israel
- Sport: Para athletics; Para archery; Wheelchair basketball
- Disability: Poliomyelitis
Medal record
Event	1st	2nd	3rd
Paralympic Games	1	3	1
Stoke Mandeville Games	1	0	2
Representing Israel
Paralympic Games
Women's para-athletics
Silver medal – second place	1968 Tel Aviv	4x40m open
Silver medal – second place	1968 Tel Aviv	60m wheelchair B
Bronze medal – third place	1968 Tel Aviv	Slalom B
Wheelchair basketball
Gold medal – first place	1968 Tel Aviv	Wheelchair basketball
Silver medal – second place	1984 Stoke Mandeville	Women's tournament
Stoke Mandeville Games
Gold medal – first place	1965	Wheelchair dash
Bronze medal – third place	1965	Backstroke swimming
Bronze medal – third place	1965	Wheelchair fencing

Neora Even-Zahav (Hebrew: נאורה אבן-זהב; born 11 October 1947) is a former Israeli Paralympic competitor in para-athletics, archery and wheelchair basketball.

== Biography ==
Even-Zhava, née Helsinger, was born in Bucharest and emigrated with her family to Mandatory Palestine at the age of four months, arriving only after detention at the Cyprus internment camps. At the age of eight she contracted polio and in 1961 she joined the Israel Sports Center for the Disabled.

At the Stoke Mandeville Games of 1965 she won a gold medal in wheelchair dash tournament. She also won two bronze medals for wheelchair fencing and for para swimming.

As a member of the national women's wheelchair basketball team she took part in the 1968 Summer Paralympics, the 1984 Summer Paralympics and the 1988 Summer Paralympics. In 1968 she also competed in archery and in para-athletics, winning two silver medals and one bronze medal in various wheelchair race events (wheelchair dash, slalom and in wheelchair relay race alongside Batia Mishani, Shoshana Sharabi and Geula Siri).

== Family ==
Her father Moshe Helsinger was a player of Maccabi București.

In 1967 she married Paralympic athlete Israel Even-Zahav.
