= Canada at the 1960 Summer Paralympics =

- Flag of Canada
- IPC code: CAN

in Rome
- Competitors: 1 in 2 sports
- Medals Ranked -th: Gold 0 Silver 0 Bronze 0 Total 0

Summer Paralympics appearances (overview)
- 1968; 1972; 1976; 1980; 1984; 1988; 1992; 1996; 2000; 2004; 2008; 2012; 2016; 2020; 2024

Canada competed at the 1960 Summer Paralympics in Rome, Italy. The delegation consisted of one competitor, in track and field athletes and in table tennis.

== Disability classifications ==
Athletes at the first Paralympics in 1960 were all afflicted by spinal cord injuries and required the use of a wheelchair. This is in contrast to later Paralympics that include events for participants that fit into any of five different disability categories; amputation, either congenital or sustained through injury or illness; cerebral palsy; wheelchair athletes; visual impairment, including blindness; Les autres, any physical disability that does not fall strictly under one of the other categories, for example dwarfism or multiple sclerosis. Each Paralympic sport then has its own classifications, dependent upon the specific physical demands of competition. Events are given a code, made of numbers and letters, describing the type of event and classification of the athletes competing.

== Athletics ==
Men

Athlete	Event	Qualification		Final	
Athlete	Event	Points	Rank	Points	Rank
Franz Bronnenhuber	Men's Precision Javelin B	42	20	Did not advance	
Franz Bronnenhuber	Men's Precision Javelin C	56	12	20	26

Sources: IPC, IPC

== Table tennis ==
Men

Athlete	Event	Final
Athlete	Event	Rank
Franz Bronnenhuber	Men's Singles B	unknown

Source: IPC

== See also ==
- Canada at the 1960 Summer Olympics
- Canada at the Paralympics
