= Jacob Ben-Arie =

Israeli Paralympic swimmer

Sport
- Country: Israel
Medal record
Event / 1st / 2nd / 3rd; Paralympic Games / 2 / 2 / 2
Representing Israel
Summer Paralympic Games
Swimming
Gold medal – first place	1964 Tokyo	25m breaststroke
Silver medal – second place	1968 Tel Aviv	50m breaststroke
Bronze medal – third place	1964 Tokyo	medley relay
Wheelchair basketball
Gold medal – first place	1968 Tel Aviv	wheelchair basketball
Silver medal – second place	1972 Heidelberg	wheelchair basketball
Bronze medal – third place	1964 Tokyo	wheelchair basketball
Stoke Mandeville Games
Swimming
Gold medal – first place	1966	50m breaststroke
Gold medal – first place	1966	3X50 medley relay
Gold medal – first place	1967	100m breaststroke
Gold medal – first place	1967	50m breaststroke
Bronze medal – third place	1966	100m breaststroke
Wheelchair basketball
Gold medal – first place	1966	wheelchair basketball
Gold medal – first place	1967	wheelchair basketball
European Championships
Gold medal – first place	1978 France	wheelchair basketball

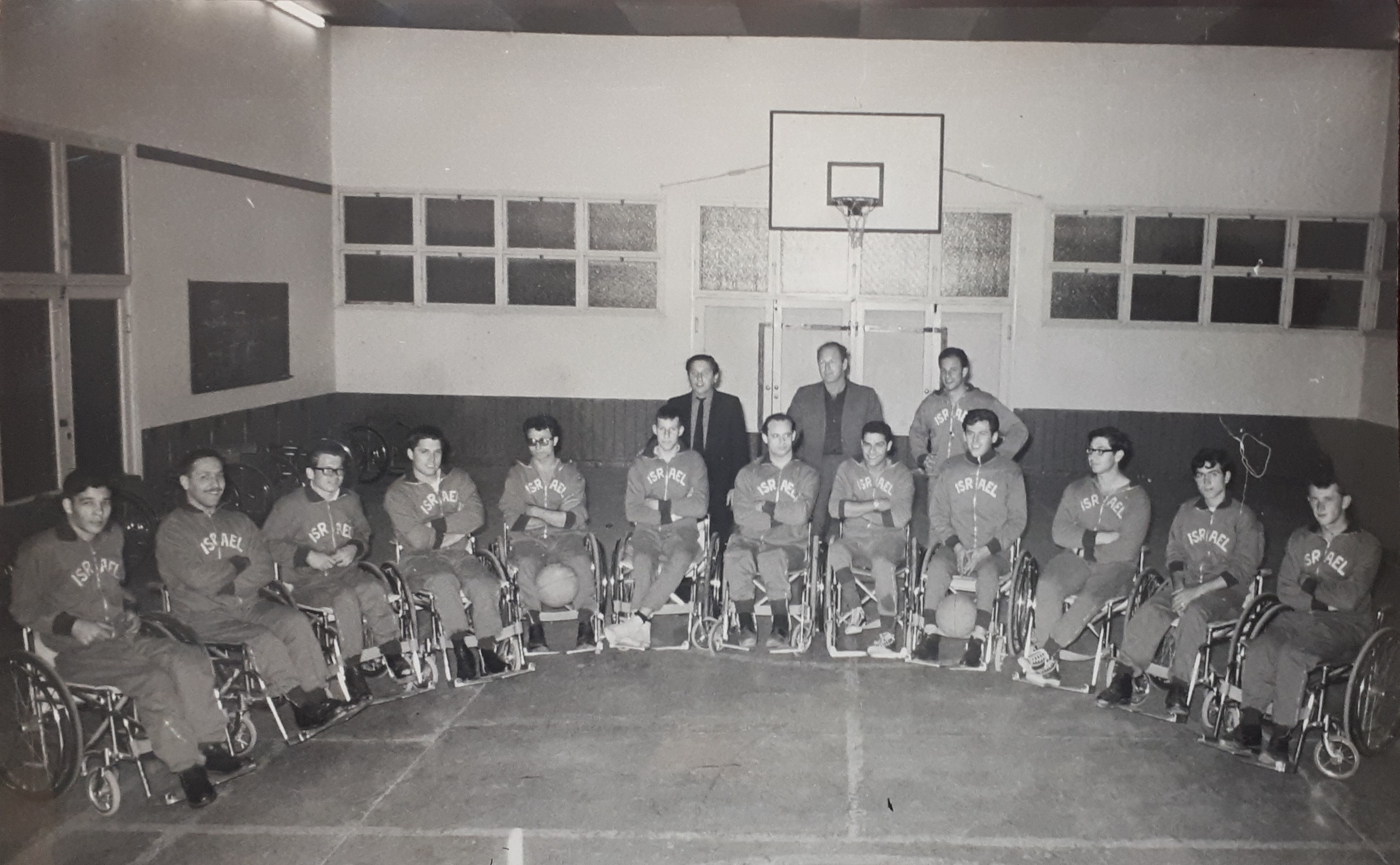
Jacob Ben-Arie (furthest left)

Jacob Ben-Arie (Hebrew: יעקב בן-אריה; born 1950) is a former Israeli paralympic champion.

Ben-Arie was affected by polio at a young age and began to practice sports at the Israel Sports Center for the Disabled after it began to operate in the 1960s.

Between 1968 and 1976, Ben-Arie completed a degree in Biology at Tel Aviv University and studied for MA in Psychology and Biomechanics at New York University. Alongside his studies he continued to practice in swimming, wheelchair basketball and athletics. Throughout the years he took part in several Stoke Mandeville Games and Paralympic Games.

At the 1964 Summer Paralympics, he won a gold medal in the 25m breaststroke swimming tournament classified as junior class and a bronze medal alongside Baruch Hagai and Avraham Keftelovitch in the mixed medley relay open. He was also a member of the Israeli wheelchair basketball team, winning a bronze medal.

At the 1968 Summer Paralympics, he won a silver medal in the 50m breaststroke swimming tournament for class 4 incomplete and a gold medal as a member of the Israeli national wheelchair basketball team. He was also a competitor in the 50m freestyle swimming tournament for class 4 incomplete and competed in athletics, racing (with Arieh Bizem, Daniel Shachar and Amnon Weiss) at the 4X40m wheelchair relay race.

At the 1972 Summer Paralympics, he was a member of Israel's wheelchair basketball team. The men's team won the silver medal.

He remained active with the national wheelchair basketball team, also taking part in 1978 Wheelchair Eurobasket held in France.

Beginning in 1978, Ben-Arie worked at "Telrad" telecommunications company, retiring in 1998 as the company's deputy CEO.

From 2002 to 2011 he was the executive director of the Israel Sports Center for the Disabled. He later began serving as it chairman.

As of 2020, he was also a member of the board of the Israel Sports Association for the Disabled, as a representative of ILAN.
