= Karen McPherson (swimmer) =

Canadian Paralympic swimmer

Personal information
- Nationality: Canadian
- Born: 1950 or 1951 (age 74–75)

Sport
- Country: Canada
- Sport: Swimming
Medal record
Athletics at the Summer Paralympics
Representing Canada
Paralympics
Bronze medal – third place	1968 Tel Aviv	Women's 50m breaststroke class 3 incomplete
Bronze medal – third place	1968 Tel Aviv	Women's 100m breaststroke open
Silver medal – second place	1968 Tel Aviv	Women's 50m backstroke class 3 incomplete

Karen McPherson (born in 1951) is a Canadian retired Paralympic athlete. She won three medals in swimming events at the 1968 Summer Paralympics, held in Tel Aviv.

== Early life ==
McPherson became paraplegic in infancy, after surviving polio. She used arm crutches, leg braces, and a wheelchair. She was a student at Vancouver's Little Flower Academy, and attended Vancouver City College.

== Swimming career ==
McPherson competed in the first Pan American Wheelchair Games, held in Winnipeg in 1967, and won seven gold medals in swimming events. She won three medals in the 1968 Summer Paralympics, held in Tel Aviv. She was the youngest British Columbian on the Canadian national team. In 1969, she swam on a relay team with Gwen John, Hilda Binns, and Elaine Ell, and won seven medals at the Pan-American Wheelchair Games in Buenos Aires. In 1971 she competed in the Western Washington Wheelchair Games in Seattle, setting a record in the backstroke event. In 1973, she broke two national records at the B.C. Wheelchair Games. She held seven national Canadian records in 1974,

McPherson was nominated for Junior Athlete of the Year by the Vancouver Junior Chamber of Commerce in 1969. She was active in the British Columbia Wheelchair Sports Association in its early years.
