= Canada at the 1972 Summer Paralympics =

- Flag of Canada
- IPC code: CAN
- NPC: Canadian Paralympic Committee
- Website: www.paralympic.ca

in Heidelberg
- Competitors: 40
- Medals Ranked 13th: Gold 5 Silver 6 Bronze 5 Total 16

Summer Paralympics appearances (overview)
- 1968; 1972; 1976; 1980; 1984; 1988; 1992; 1996; 2000; 2004; 2008; 2012; 2016; 2020; 2024

Canada sent a delegation to compete at the 1972 Summer Paralympics in Heidelberg, West Germany. They sent forty competitors, twenty seven male and thirteen female.

== Disability classifications ==
Athletes at the Paralympics in 1972 were all afflicted by spinal cord injuries and required the use of a wheelchair. This is in contrast to later Paralympics that include events for participants that fit into any of five different disability categories; amputation, either congenital or sustained through injury or illness; cerebral palsy; wheelchair athletes; visual impairment, including blindness; Les autres, any physical disability that does not fall strictly under one of the other categories, for example dwarfism or multiple sclerosis. Each Paralympic sport then has its own classifications, dependent upon the specific physical demands of competition. Events are given a code, made of numbers and letters, describing the type of event and classification of the athletes competing.

== Medallists ==
Medal	Name	Sport	Event
Gold	B. Simpson	Athletics	Men's 100m wheelchair 5
Gold	Eugene Reimer	Athletics	Men's discus throw 4
Gold	Douglas Bovee	Athletics	Men's slalom 1A
Gold	Eugene Reimer	Athletics	Men's pentathlon 4
Gold	Richard Wasnock	Swimming	Men's 75m individual medley 2
Silver	Douglas Bovee	Athletics	Men's 60m wheelchair 1A
Silver	Walter Dann; F. Henderson; Eugene Reimer; B. Simpson	Athletics	Men's 4x60m wheelchair relay open
Silver	R. Muise	Athletics	Men's shot put 1B
Silver	Hilda Mae Binns	Athletics	Women's 60m wheelchair 3
Silver	Joyce Murland	Athletics	Women's javelin throw 1A
Silver	Hilda Mae Binns	Athletics	Women's slalom 3
Bronze	Douglas Bovee	Athletics	Men's shot put 1A
Bronze	Joyce Murland	Athletics	Women's shot put 1A
Bronze	S. Long	Athletics	Women's slalom 1B
Bronze	Hilda Mae Binns	Athletics	Women's pentathlon 3
Bronze	Demerakas	Swimming	Women's 25m backstroke 1A

== Archery ==
Canada entered six of its forty competitors, five male and one female in this event. They won no medals at all in this event.

== Athletics ==
Canada entered thirty five of its forty competitors, twenty three male and twelve female in this event. They won fourteen medals, four gold, six silver, four bronze in this event.

== Swimming ==
Canada entered fourteen of its forty competitors, nine male and five female in this event. They won two medals, one gold, and one bronze in this event. Demerakas got the bronze, while Wasnock won the gold medal.
