= Tshuva (surname) =

Tshuva (Hebrew: תשובה) is a surname. Notable people with the surname include:

- Avraham Tshuva (Hebrew: אברהם תשובה), Israeli journalist
- Rafi Tshuva (Hebrew: רפי תשובה; born 1957), Israeli football striker
- Yitzhak Tshuva (Hebrew: יצחק תשובה), Israeli businessman
