= Shalom Dlugatch =

Israeli paralympic athlete

Personal information
- Native name: 'שלום דלוגץ
- Born: 16 September 1943
- Died: 21 July 2018 (aged 74)

Sport
- Country: Israel
- Sport: Weightlifting
Medal record
Event / 1st / 2nd / 3rd; Paralympic Games / 1 / 0 / 2
Representing Israel
Paralympic Games
Weightlifting
Gold medal – first place	1964 Tokyo	Men's Heavyweight
Bronze medal – third place	1980 Arnhem	Heavyweight Over 85kg Paraplegic
Wheelchair basketball
Bronze medal – third place	1964 Tokyo	wheelchair basketball

Shalom Dlugatch (Hebrew: שלום דלוגץ'; 16 September 1943 – 21 July 2018) was an Israeli weightlifter who participated in two Summer Paralympic Games.

Dlugatch was born during the Second World War in the Ural Mountains. In 1948 the family immigrated to Israel. He was active in the Israel ParaSport Center and took part in the Stoke Mandeville Games.

At the 1964 Summer Paralympics he gained two medals. He won a bronze medal as a member of the Israeli wheelchair basketball team. In weightlifting he won a gold medal after pressing 157.5 kg and set a new world record.

At the 1980 Summer Paralympics he won a bronze medal in weightlifting after pressing 207.5 kg.

Dlugatch was a political and social activist. In 1977 he was elected as chairman of a national association for the disabled.

He died in Petah Tikva in 2018.
