= Avraham Tshuva =

Israeli Paralympic athlete

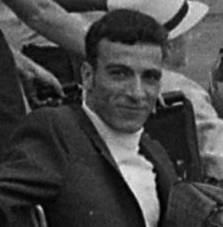

Personal information
- Native name: אברהם תשובה
Medal record
Event / 1st / 2nd / 3rd; Paralympic Games / 1 / 0 / 0
Representing Israel
Summer Paralympic Games
Wheelchair basketball
Gold medal – first place	1968 Tel Aviv	wheelchair basketball

Avraham Tshuva (Hebrew: אברהם תשובה) is an Israeli journalist reporting on disabled sports events and a former athlete and member of the national wheelchair basketball team.

== Biography ==
Avraham Tshuva, disabled by polio, has been a member of the Israel Sports Center for the Disabled since 1961. A certified basketball coach by the Wingate Institute, for many years he coached the center's men's and women's wheelchair basketball teams. As a certified sports journalist he joined the center's administration as its spokesperson, also providing the daily newspapers with coverage on all aspects of disabled sports since the 1970s.

In the 1968 Summer Paralympics held in Tel Aviv, Tshuva competed in a wheelchair dash and in slalom. He was also a member of the gold medal-winning men's wheelchair basketball team.

In 2007 Tshuva was honored with a distinction by ILAN. In June 2011 he was elected as a member of the council of "BeMa'avak" – an umbrella organization for the rights of people with disabilities in Israel.
