= Malka Potashnik =

Israeli Paralympic competitor

Malka Halfon-Potashnik
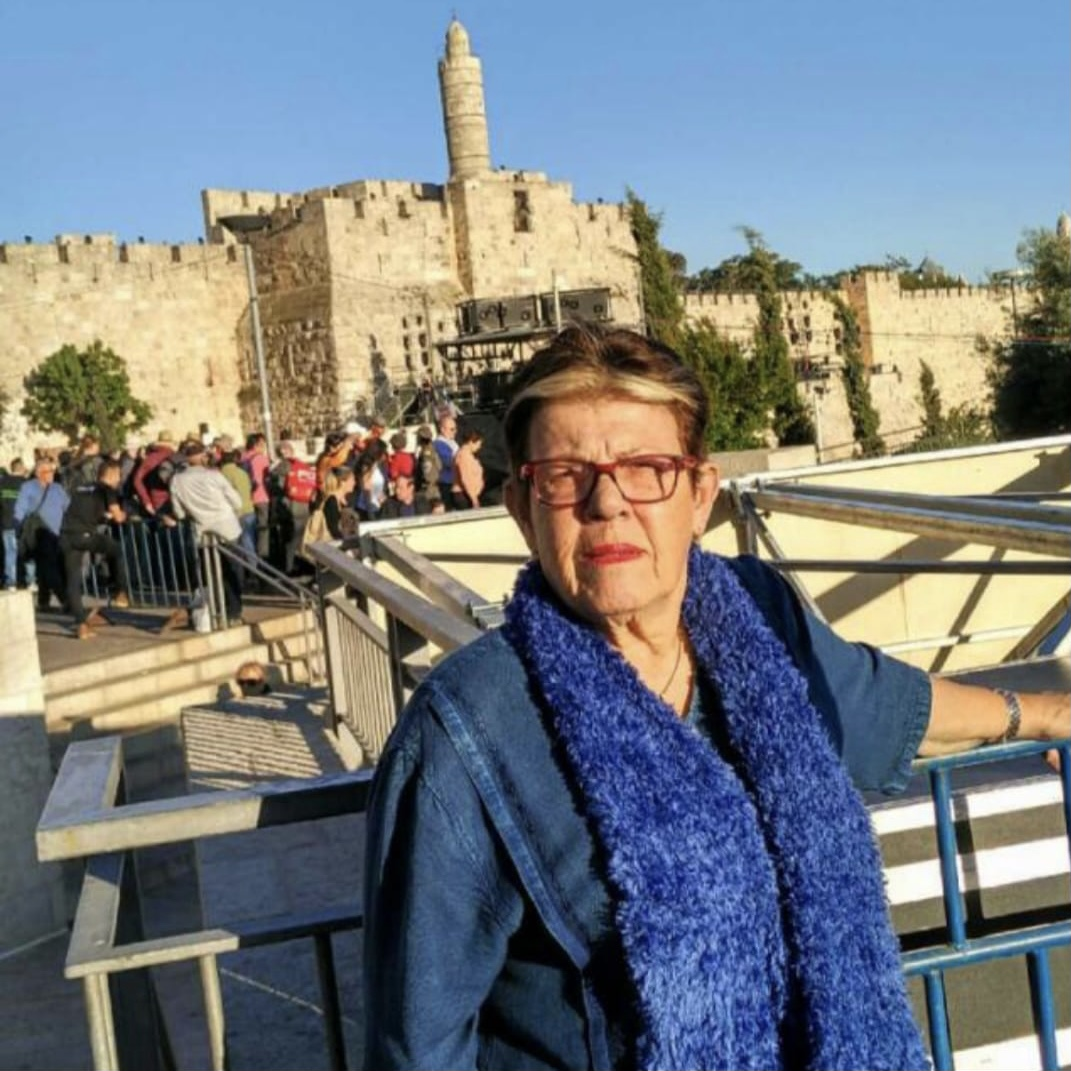

Personal information
- Native name: מלכה חלפון-פוטשניק

Sport
- Country: Israel
- Sport: Wheelchair basketball Paralympic athletics Paralympic swimming
Medal record
Event / 1st / 2nd / 3rd; Paralympic Games / 4 / 5 / 1
Representing Israel
Paralympic Games
Paralympic athletics
| Gold medal – first place | 1968 Tel Aviv | Club throw special class |
| Gold medal – first place | 1968 Tel Aviv | Javelin special class |
| Gold medal – first place | 1972 Heidelberg | Shot put 5 |
| Silver medal – second place | 1968 Tel Aviv | Discus throw special class |
| Silver medal – second place | 1968 Tel Aviv | Shot put special class |
| Silver medal – second place | 1972 Heidelberg | Javelin throw 5 |
| Bronze medal – third place | 1972 Heidelberg | Discus throw 5 |
Paralympic swimming
| Silver medal – second place | 1968 Tel Aviv | 50m breaststroke special class |
| Silver medal – second place | 1968 Tel Aviv | Medley relay |
Wheelchair basketball
| Gold medal – first place | 1968 Tel Aviv | Women's tournament |

Malka Halfon-Potashnik (Hebrew: מלכה חלפון-פוטשניק; born 1949) is an Israeli Paralympic champion. She won four gold, four silver, and one bronze medal.

== Life ==
Potashnik was born into the Halfon family and experiences paralysis in her right leg. She began training at a sports center for people with disabilities, and in 1967, she participated in the Stoke Mandeville Games where she won both gold and silver medals.

At the 1968 Summer Paralympics, in Tel Aviv, she won gold medals in Wheelchair Basketball, Women's Club Throw Special class, and Women's Javelin Special class. She won silver medals in Women's Shot Put Special class, Women's 50 meters Breaststroke Special class, Women's swimming medley relay, and Women's Discus Throw Special class.

At the 1972 Summer Paralympics, in Heidelberg, she won a gold medal in Women's Shot Put 5, silver medal in Women's Javelin 5, and bronze medal in Women's Discus Throw 5.

At the 1992 Summer Paralympics in Barcelona, she competed in Women's Discus Throw THS2, and Women's Shot Put THS2.

== Family ==
In 1968, she married disabled athlete Zvi Potashnik. From 1967 to 1980, while at the height of her athletic career, she worked as an operator at the Office Mechanization Center of the Ministry of Finance.
