= Geula Siri =

Israeli Paralympic athlete (born 1949)

Personal information
- Native name: גאולה סירי

Sport
- Country: Israel
Medal record
Event / 1st / 2nd / 3rd; Paralympic Games / 1 / 2 / 4
Representing Israel
Paralympic Games
Women's para-athletics
Silver medal – second place	1968 Tel Aviv	4x40m open
Silver medal – second place	1968 Tel Aviv	Javelin special class
Bronze medal – third place	1968 Tel Aviv	Novices 60m C
Bronze medal – third place	1968 Tel Aviv	Discus throw special class
Bronze medal – third place	1968 Tel Aviv	Club throw special class
Bronze medal – third place	1968 Tel Aviv	Shot put special class
Women's wheelchair basketball
Gold medal – first place	1968 Tel Aviv	Wheelchair basketball

Geula Siri (Hebrew: גאולה סירי; born 1949) is a former Israeli athlete who has won 7 Paralympic medals.

== Biography ==
Siri was born in Sanaa, Yemen and immigrated to Israel with her family in Operation Magic Carpet in 1950. She grew up in Bat Yam and joined the Israel ParaSport Center.

Siri participated in the 1968 Summer Paralympics as a competitor in para athletics and a member of the women's wheelchair basketball team. She competed in eight tournaments and won medals in six: gold medal with the basketball team, silver medals in javelin and 4X40 wheelchair race relay, and bronze medals in discus throw, club throw, shot put and novices. Her two other performances were in javelin precision and in wheelchair slalom. Twenty years later, her performance in the 1988 Summer Paralympics gained her top ranks outside the medal table: fourth place in javelin and in pentathlon, fifth place in shot put and sixth place in discus throw.
