= Yitzhak Gil-Ad =

Israeli Paralympic athlete (born 1943)

Yitzhak Gil-Ad (Galitzki)
Personal information
- Native name: יצחק גיל-עד
Medal record
Event / 1st / 2nd / 3rd; Paralympic Games / 2 / 0 / 3
Representing Israel
Paralympic Games
Men's para athletics
Gold medal – first place	1968 Tel Aviv	Discus throw C
Gold medal – first place	1976 Toronto	Discus throw 3
Table tennis
Bronze medal – third place	1964 Tokyo	Doubles C
Wheelchair basketball
Gold medal – first place	1968 Tel Aviv	wheelchair basketball
Bronze medal – third place	1964 Tokyo	wheelchair basketball

Yitzhak Gil-Ad (Hebrew: יצחק גיל-עד; born Yitzhak Galitzki; born 1943) is a former Israeli Paralympic competitor.

Gil-Ad was born in Tel Aviv and contracted polio at a young age.

He competed in the Summer Paralympics four times and took part in table tennis, discus throw and wheelchair basketball tournaments.

Gil-Ad won two individual medals, in discus throw tournaments of para athletics: gold in the 1968 Summer Paralympics and bronze in the 1976 Summer Paralympics. He also participated in shot put tournaments at the 1968, 1972 and 1976 Summer Games, in javelin at the 1968 and 1972 Summer Games and in club throw at the 1968 Summer Games.

He won three additional Paralympic medals in team competitions: a gold medal in table tennis alongside Baruch Hagai in doubles tournament at the 1964 Summer Games and gold and bronze medals as a member of the men's wheelchair basketball team, in the 1964 and 1968 Summer Games.

== See also ==
- Israel at the 1964 Summer Paralympics
- Israel at the 1968 Summer Paralympics
- Israel at the 1972 Summer Paralympics
- Israel at the 1976 Summer Paralympics
