= Zvi Potashnik =

Israeli paralympian

Personal information
- Native name: צבי פוטשניק

Sport
- Country: Israel
Medal record
Event	1st	2nd	3rd
Paralympic Games	1	0	0
Stoke Mandeville Games	0	1	0
Representing Israel
Summer Paralympic Games
Wheelchair basketball
Gold medal – first place	1968 Tel Aviv	wheelchair basketball
Stoke Mandeville Games
Swimming
Silver medal – second place	1962	50m breaststroke

Zvi Potashnik (Hebrew: צבי פוטשניק) is a former wheelchair basketball player for Israel.

Potashnik was born in Haifa and was among the first members of the Israel Sports Center for the Disabled, competing in wheelchair basketball, swimming and table tennis. He was a member of the national wheelchair basketball team from 1960 to 1976.

A member of the Israeli delegation to the Stoke Mandeville Games of 1962, Potashnik won silver medal in 50 meter breaststroke. At the 1968 Summer Paralympics he was a member of the gold medal-winning wheelchair basketball team.

In 1967 he was a founding member of a sports club for disabled athletes in Kiryat Sprinzak.

Potashnik married Paralympic athlete Malka Halfon.
