= Betty Dubiner =

Canadian-born Israeli model and activist (1912–2008)

- בטי דובינר
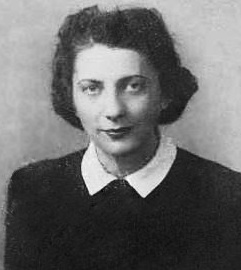
- Betty Dubiner in 1940
- Born: Betty Vivian Zimmerman; 3 June 1912; London, Ontario, Canada
- Died: 15 February 2008 (aged 95); Tel Aviv, Israel
- Other names: Betty Vivian Dubiner
- Occupations: model, disabilities activist
- Years active: 1949–2008
- Known for: establishing the first organizations for the disabled in Israel

Betty Dubiner (Hebrew: בטי דובינר; 3 June 1912 – 15 February 2008) was a Canadian-born Israeli, who was instrumental in obtaining vaccines for the new nation of Israel to combat a polio epidemic and the development of programs to assist disabled people. Founder of the organization Ilenshil-Polio, which later became the Israeli Association for Children with Disabilities (ILAN) and the Israel Sports Center for the Disabled, she was recognized with the President's Award for Volunteerism in 1988, for her contributions to Israeli society.

== Early life ==
Bettina Vivian Dubiner was born on 3 June 1912, in London, Ontario, Canada to Bessie Z. (née Sickind) and Alexander Zimmerman. Her mother, died upon Zimmerman's birth and her father, traveled often as a salesman. She was raised by an aunt and uncle in Ontario and began a modelling career in Toronto. For a period prior to her marriage, she lived in New York City as worked as a buyer for a fashion company. On 30 June 1935 in Hamilton, Ontario, she married Samuel Dubiner, a toy manufacturer. In Canada, the couple were active in Betar and were involved in the Canadian League for a Free Palestine.

== Activism ==
In 1949, Sam opened a plastics factory in Israel and the couple moved permanently to Tel Aviv in 1950. He branched out his industrial development, opening a factory which produced boxes and containers for shipping exported goods. Dubiner designed containers for his company and received a US patent on one of her designs. Almost immediately upon their arrival, the couple enrolled in an ulpan for an immersion in Israeli culture and language. At the school, they learned of transit tent-camps and when a winter storm upended the temporary shelters, the Dubiners drove to the camps and transported refugees to safer housing. With the outbreak of the polio epidemic in 1950, Dubiner created the first volunteer organization in Israel, establishing Ilenshil-Polio to assist in the treatment of people with the disease in 1952. She was responsible for bringing the polio vaccine to Israel, as well as orthopedic braces to assist in rehabilitation. Holding fundraisers and recruiting volunteers, Dubiner established training centers for the treatment and therapy of victims and resource outreaches for their families.

As head of the organization, Dubiner initiated an annual March of Dimes campaign in 1958 to raise funds for Ilenshil-Polio, which was later renamed Israeli Association for Children with Disabilities (ILAN). ILAN spread throughout the nation and by 1988 was operating in 70 locations. Hosting summer camps and sporting events for paralyzed children, Dubiner and Gershon Huberman conceived of a plan to build a permanent facility. In 1960, she drove for the creation of the Bella and Samuel Spewack Sport Center in Ramat Gan to serve as a recreational and therapeutic center for disabled children and adults. The center was originally named after the benefactors who donated the royalties from their show Kiss Me, Kate to fund the building of the center.

During the Six-Day War in 1967, Dubiner, at the request of the government helped recruit hoteliers and householders to provide lodging to the pilots engaged in the campaign. As the government feared their base housing would become a target, it was necessary to find safe shelters away from the military facilities. In 1988, Dubiner was the recipient of the President's Award for Volunteerism, in recognition of her work on behalf of the disabled community of Israel. That same year, the Montreal-based Canadian branch of ILAN established a home for disabled young adults in Jerusalem and were raising funds to build a kindergarten near Haifa. After her husband's death in 1993, Dubiner edited thirteen books on the history of Israel's development. An avid collector, she had clipped newspaper articles since her days in Canada. She donated her collection, "the most comprehensive archives of the history of Israel" to Ariel University.

== Death and legacy ==
Dubiner died on 15 February 2008 in the neighborhood of Nahalat Yitzhak, in Tel Aviv, Israel. She was buried in the Nahalat Yitzhak Cemetery. In March 2008 a memorial was held for Dubiner with dignitaries, ILAN staff, and volunteers, to honor her contributions to the development of programs for disabled citizens in Israel.
