= Eugene Reimer =

Canadian paralympic athlete

- Eugene Reimer wearing a Team Canada shirt in 1979

Personal information
- Nickname: Gene
- Born: 21 January 1940 Swift Current, Saskatchewan
- Died: 9 June 2008 (aged 68) Abbotsford, British Columbia, Canada

Sport
- Country: Canada
- Sport: Paralympic athletics
Medal record
Summer Paralympics
Gold medal – first place	1968 Tel Aviv	Discus Throw B
Gold medal – first place	1968 Tel Aviv	Club Throw B
Silver medal – second place	1968 Tel Aviv	Javelin Throw B
Gold medal – first place	1972 Heidelberg	Discus Throw 4
Gold medal – first place	1972 Heidelberg	Pentathlon 4
Silver medal – second place	1972 Heidelberg	4×60 m wheelchair relay open
Silver medal – second place	1976 Toronto	Discus Throw 4
Silver medal – second place	1976 Toronto	Discus Throw 4
Silver medal – second place	1976 Toronto	Pentathlon 4
Bronze medal – third place	1976 Toronto	Javelin Throw 4
Bronze medal – third place	1980 Arnhem	Discus Throw 4

Eugene "Gene" Reimer CM (21 January 1940 – 9 June 2008) was a Canadian wheelchair Paralympic athlete who won 10 Paralympic medals and 50 Canadian and Pan-American medals from 1968 to 1980. Having polio at an early age, he was a member of the wheelchair basketball team Vancouver Cable Cars alongside Terry Fox and Rick Hansen. In 1972, Reimer became the first person with a disability to be named Canada's Outstanding Male Athlete of the Year and to be inducted into the Order of Canada.

== Personal life ==
Reimer was born on 21 January 1940 in Swift Current, Saskatchewan. At the age of three, he contacted polio, leaving him with paraplegia. He later moved to Abbotsford, British Columbia, where he lived with his two sons and daughter. Reimer died on 9 June 2008 at the age of 68.

Throughout his career, Reimer excelled at a variety of sports despite his disability, including track-and-field, weightlifting, archery, swimming, volleyball, and table tennis. He was an avid wheelchair basketball player. He played for 19 years for the wheelchair basketball team Vancouver Cable Cars alongside Rick Hansen and Terry Fox, winning the 1979 National Championships.

== Athletic career ==
Reimer participated in his first Paralympics Game in 1968 in Tel Aviv. Competing in table tennis, swimming, and track events, he won gold at the Men's Discus Throw B with a distance of 27.47 metres. He also placed first at the Men's Club Throw B with a throw of 42.01 metres, beating the silver medalist by nearly 16 metres. At the Men's Javelin Throw B, he placed second with a throw of 36.21 metres.

At the 1972 Paralympic Games in Heidelberg, West Germany, Reimer set the world record for the Men's Pentathlon 4 at 5141 points, one point more than the silver medalist. He also set the world record for the Discus Throw 4, with a final width of 29.91 metres. Alongside Dann W., Henderson F., and Simpson B, they came second at the Men's 4×60 Wheelchair Open Relay with a time of 0:56:30.

At the 1976 Paralympic Games in Toronto, Reimer's record in the Men's Discus Throw B was broken by Remi Ophem and he finished second. Reimer also finished second in the Men's Pentathlon 4 with a score of 3295. In the Men's Javelin event, he finished third with a distance of 23.05 metres. At his final Paralympic Game, in 1980 at Arnhem, Netherlands, Reimer was able to top the podium of the Men's Discus Throw B with a throw of 29.80 metres, beating the second-place finisher by 36 centimetres.

== Awards ==
In 1972, Reimer became the first person with a disability to be named Canada's Outstanding Male Athlete of the Year and he was also inducted into the Canadian Sports Hall of Fame. He was the first disabled athlete to be awarded the Order of Canada medal in 1974 for "his inspiring example to persons with disabilities".

In 2000, he was inducted into the Terry Fox Hall of Fame, and two years later he became the first disabled athlete to be inducted into the BC Sports Hall of Fame. The same year, Reimer ran the BC Disability Games and Eugene Reimer Middle School was created and named after him.
