= Shoshana Sharabi =

Israeli Paralympic competitor

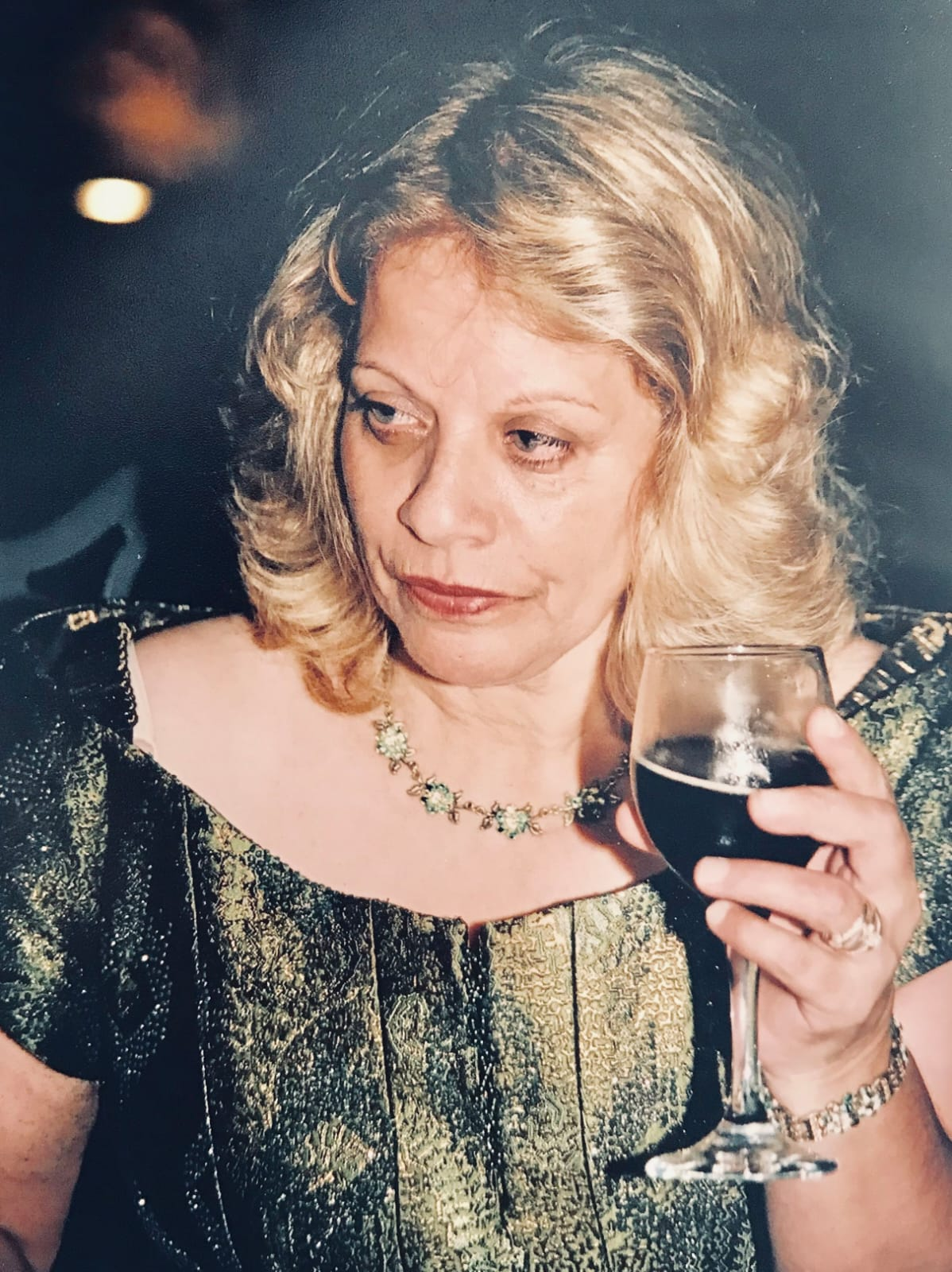

Personal information
- Native name: שושנה שרעבי
- Born: 10 December 1950
- Died: 1 October 2018 (aged 67)

Sport
- Country: Israel
- Sport: Paralympic athletics Wheelchair basketball Wheelchair fencing
- Disability: Polio
Medal record
Event / 1st / 2nd / 3rd; Paralympic Games / 3 / 2 / 1
Representing Israel
Paralympic Games
Wheelchair fencing
Gold medal – first place	1968 Tel Aviv	Novices foil
Gold medal – first place	1972 Heidelberg	Foil team
Silver medal – second place	1972 Heidelberg	Foil individual
Paralympic athletics
Silver medal – second place	1968 Tel Aviv	4x40m relay open
Bronze medal – third place	1968 Tel Aviv	Club throw D
Wheelchair basketball
Gold medal – first place	1968 Tel Aviv	Wheelchair basketball

Shoshana Sharabi (Hebrew: שושנה שרעבי; 1950 - 2018) was an Israeli Paralympic athlete, wheelchair fencer and wheelchair basketball player. She won three gold medals, in foil and in wheelchair basketball.

== Biography ==
Shoshana Sharabi was left disabled by polio, which she contracted as a child.

At the 1968 Summer Paralympics, she won a gold medal in Women's Novices Foil, and Women's Wheelchair Basketball. She won a bronze medal in Women's Club Throw D, and silver medal in Women's 4 x 40 meters Open. She also competed in Women's Slalom C.

At the 1972 Summer Paralympics, she won a gold medal with the women's foil team and a silver medal in Women's Foil Individual.
