= Avraham Keftelovitch =

Israeli Paralympic swimmer

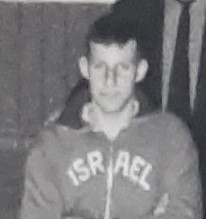

Personal information
- Native name: אברהם קפטלוביץ
- Born: 1947
- Died: May 13, 2025 (aged 77–78)

Sport
- Country: Israel
Medal record
Event / 1st / 2nd / 3rd; Paralympic Games / 1 / 1 / 4
Representing Israel
Summer Paralympic Games
Swimming
Silver medal – second place	1964 Tokyo	50 m Breaststroke Special class
Bronze medal – third place	1964 Tokyo	50 m Freestyle Prone Special class
Bronze medal – third place	1964 Tokyo	Mixed Medley Relay Open
Bronze medal – third place	1968 Tel Aviv	50 m Freestyle Class 4 incomplete
Wheelchair basketball
Gold medal – first place	1968 Tel Aviv	wheelchair basketball
Bronze medal – third place	1964 Tokyo	wheelchair basketball

Avraham Keftelovitch (Hebrew: אברהם קפטלוביץ'; 1947-May 13, 2025) was an Israeli former paralympic swimmer.

At the 1964 Summer Paralympics, he won four medals, three of which in para swimming: a silver medal in the 50m breaststroke swimming tournament classified as special class, a bronze medal in 50m freestyle prone special class and a second bronze medal as a member of the relay swimming team for mixed medley (alongside Jacob Ben-Arie and Baruch Hagai). His fourth medal, also a bronze, was as a member of Israel's wheelchair basketball team. At the 1968 Summer Paralympics, he won a bronze medal in 50m freestyle swimming class 4 and a gold medal as a member of the Israeli national wheelchair basketball team.

Between 1969 and 1971 he was a professional wheelchair basketball player in Bulova, New York, United States and took part in the 1970 all star game.

Keftlovitch lived in Oranit.

He died on May 13, 2025, after enduring great suffering from a serious illness. He was 77 years old at the time of his death.
