= Zvi Ben-Zvi =

Israeli Paralympic athlete

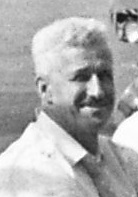

Personal information
- Native name: צבי בן-צבי
- National team: Israel
- Born: 1927
- Died: 1988 (aged 60–61)

Sport
- Country: Israel
- Sport: Para athletics; Wheelchair basketball
Medal record
Event	1st	2nd	3rd
Paralympic Games	1	0	2
Stoke Mandeville Games	0	0	2
Representing Israel
Paralympic Games
Wheelchair basketball
Gold medal – first place	1968 Tel Aviv	wheelchair basketball
Bronze medal – third place	1964 Tokyo	wheelchair basketball
Bronze medal – third place	1960 Rome	wheelchair basketball
Stoke Mandeville Games
Bronze medal – third place	1955	Wheelchair basketball
Bronze medal – third place	1957	Javelin throw

Zvi Ben-Zvi (Hebrew: צבי בן-צבי; 1927–- 12 October 1988) was an Israeli Paralympic competitor in para-athletics and wheelchair basketball.

== Biography ==
Ben-Zvi was wounded during his military service in the 1948 Arab–Israeli War.

In 1953, he was one of three delegates representing Israel in the Stoke Mandeville Games for the first time. He returned to the Games several times during the 1950s and won at least two bronze medals, one in athletics and another in wheelchair basketball.

As a member of the national men's wheelchair basketball he took part in the 1960 Summer Paralympics, the 1964 Summer Paralympics and the 1968 Summer Paralympics, winning one gold medal (1968) and two bronze medals (1960, 1964). Ben-Zvi also competed in Athletics and participated in the 1972 Summer Paralympics and the 1976 Summer Paralympics. He took part in the events for club throw (1964, 1968), shot put (1964, 1968, 1972 and 1976), javelin throw and precision javelin (1968, 1972 and 1976) and wheelchair novices dash (1968).

At the 1968 Summer Paralympics held in Israel, Ben-Zvi was the athletes' representative for the Paralympic Oath.

At the 1972 Summer Paralympics, Ben-Zvi was head of the Israeli delegation.
