= Amnon Weiss =

Israeli Paralympic track and field athlete

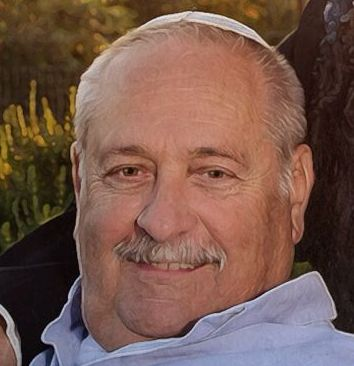

Personal information
- Native name: אמנון וייס

Sport
- Country: Israel
Medal record
Event / 1st / 2nd / 3rd; Paralympic Games / 1 / 1 / 2
Representing Israel
Summer Paralympic Games
Athletics
Silver medal – second place	1968 Tel Aviv	Shot Put D
Bronze medal – third place	1968 Tel Aviv	Javelin D
Bronze medal – third place	1968 Tel Aviv	Discus throw D
Wheelchair basketball
Gold medal – first place	1968 Tel Aviv	wheelchair basketball
Stoke Mandeville Games
Athletics
Gold medal – first place	1962	Shot Put
Gold medal – first place	1962	Javelin
Gold medal – first place	1963	Javelin
Silver medal – second place	1967	Shot Put
Silver medal – second place	1967	Javelin
Bronze medal – third place	1967	Club throw
Bronze medal – third place	1967	Discus

Amnon Weiss (Hebrew: אמנון וייס; born 1943) is an Israeli businessman and a former paralympic champion.

Weiss has a light disability due to polio. In his youth he joined the Israel Sports Center for the Disabled, where he practiced various fields of athletics alongside studies of psychology at Bar Ilan University. Later on he studied law.

A member of the Israeli delegation to the Stoke Mandeville Games, Weiss was a gold-medal champion in javelin and shot put. Prior to the 1968 Paralympic Games he won four medals at the 1967 Stoke Mandeville Games (two silver, in shot put and javelin and two bronze, in club throw and discus) and was the national champion in shot put. At the Paralympic Games Weiss was a member of the gold medal-winning wheelchair basketball team and won three medals in athletics.

In the early 1970s, Weiss and his wife Daniella were among the founding members of Gush Emunim, later settling in Kedumim where Daniela was elected to head the local council. Their son-in-law Avraham Gavish was killed in a terrorist attack in 2002.

Weiss was the owner of a goldsmith business, later dealing with real-estate and in 2005 investing in the establishment of Gvaot Winery.
