= Israel Globus =

Israeli paralympic champion (1942–1992)

Personal information
- Native name: ישראל גלובוס
- Born: 1942
- Died: 1992 (aged 49–50)

Sport
- Country: Israel
- Sport: Wheelchair basketball; Para swimming
Medal record
Event / 1st / 2nd / 3rd; Paralympic Games / 1 / 1 / 3
Representing Israel
Summer Paralympic Games
Wheelchair basketball
Bronze medal – third place	1960 Rome	Men's tournament
Bronze medal – third place	1964 Tokyo	Men's tournament
Gold medal – first place	1968 Tel Aviv	Men's tournament
Silver medal – second place	1972 Heidelberg	Men's tournament
Swimming
Bronze medal – third place	1960 Rome	50m backstroke class 4

Israel Globus (Hebrew: ישראל גלובוס; 1942–1992) was an Israeli paralympic competitor in wheelchair basketball and para swimming who took part in the Summer Paralympic Games from 1960 to 1976. From 1979 to 1992 he was the Registrar of Companies in the Ministry of Justice.

== Biography ==
Globus was affected by polio at age 14. After completing his law studies in the Hebrew University of Jerusalem he began working for the Ministry of Justice.

In 1974 Globus was in charge of the computerization of the Registrar of Companies Unit. In 1979 he was appointed as the Registrar, a position he held until his death in 1992. For some time he was also the Registrar of Patents.

As a Paralympic competitor Globus took part in the 1960 Summer Paralympics as a swimmer and achieved third place in the 50 metre backstroke event for class 4 swimmers. His main focus was in wheelchair basketball and as a member of Israel men's national wheelchair basketball team he took part in the Paralympic Games from 1960 to 1972.

Globus headed the umbrella organization of 23 non-profit organizations concerning the disabled and was also among the first in Israel to experience post-polio syndrome. He died in 1992 at the age of 49.
