= Israel Even-Zahav =

Israeli Paralympic athlete (1946–2024)

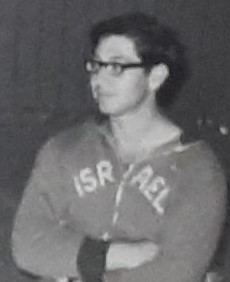

Personal information
- Native name: ישראל אבן-זהב
- Born: 12 August 1946
- Died: 2 June 2024 (aged 77)

Sport
- Country: Israel
- Sport: Para athletics; Wheelchair basketball; Archery
Medal record
Event / 1st / 2nd / 3rd; Paralympic Games / 1 / 1 / 1
Representing Israel
Summer Paralympic Games
Athletics
Silver medal – second place	1968 Tel Aviv	Discus throw D
Wheelchair basketball
Bronze medal – third place	1964 Tokyo	wheelchair basketball
Gold medal – first place	1968 Tel Aviv	wheelchair basketball

Israel Even-Zahav (Hebrew: ישראל אבן-זהב; 12 August 1946 – 2 June 2024) was an Israeli Paralympic athlete.

Even-Zahav was affected by polio at a young age. In the 1960s he began practicing athletics, archery and wheelchair basketball at the Israel Sports Center for the Disabled in Ramat Gan.

A member of the national delegation to the 1964 Summer Paralympics, Even-Zahav finished fifth in the discus throw competition and was a member of the gold medal-winning wheelchair basketball team. He was also a member of the wheelchair basketball team in the 1968 Summer Paralympics, also winning a silver medal in athletics (Discus throw) and taking part in shot put, club throw and archery competitions.

Even-Zahav was a civil engineer and an accessibility consultant to the Standards Institute of Israel. He also chaired the accessibility committee in the non-profit Israeli Human Rights Organization of People With Disabilities.

Even-Zahav married fellow athlete Neora Helsinger in 1967. He died on 2 June 2024, at the age of 77.
