= ILAN =

Israel Association for Children With Disabilities

- איל"ן - איגוד ישראלי לילדים נפגעים
- Formation: 1963; 63 years ago
- Founder: Betty Dubiner
- Type: Non-profit
- Headquarters: Israel
- Services: Treatment and support for disabled children
- Website: https://ilan-israel.co.il/

ILAN- Israel Association for Children With Disabilities (Hebrew: איל"ן - איגוד ישראלי לילדים נפגעים) is an Israeli umbrella organization for the treatment of physically disabled people of all ages. It provides various a range of services, assisting their integration into society and meeting various needs.

ILAN was awarded the Israel Prize for lifetime achievement in 2010 and the Presidential Order for Volunteerism. It also serves as adviser to the United Nations Economic and Social Council (ECOSOC) to promote action for a sustainable world.

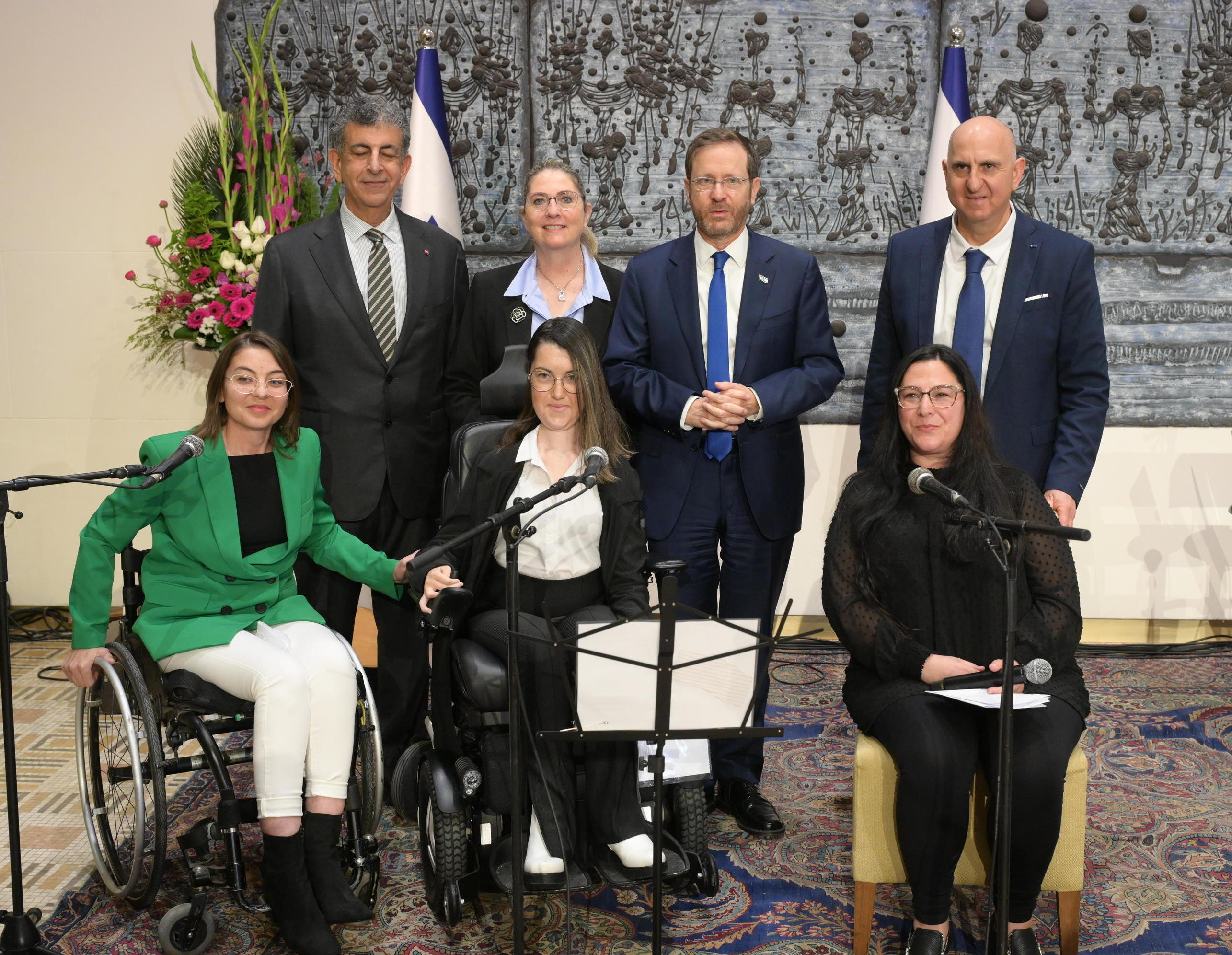
President Isaac Herzog and First Lady Michal Herzog hosting the opening ceremony of the ILAN working year, March 2022

== History ==
ILAN was founded in 1963, and expanded its scope to all disabled children.

Its precursor organizations were the ILANSHIL organization, founded in 1952 during the polio epidemic in Israel, and the "Penny March" (similar to the March of Dimes in the US) started by Betty Dubiner to help polio victims. In 1957 the organizations merged and together with the Ministry of Health, they led the national vaccination campaign. At this same time Shatlam, the organization to help patients with cerebral palsy was founded.

In 1960, the Israel ParaSport Center (formerly the Spivak Israel Sport Center for the Disabled (ISCD) was established in Ramat Gan.

In April 1964, the founding conference of Ilan was held, attended by representatives of Ilanshil-Polio, ALYN Hospital, Shatlam, and Akim.

== Activities ==
The organization engages in activities to promote the welfare, education, and rehabilitation of injured children until they reach adulthood. After that, the organization offers opportunities for integration into appropriate employment, residential, and social settings. All activities are open to people with physical disabilities regardless of religion, culture, or socio-economic group, at its centers throughout the country.

=== Rehabilitation ===
ILAN helps people regain control over their life with tailored tools, from mobility aids to adaptive devices, designed to accelerate progress, as well as hydrotherapy sessions, sports rehabilitation, and personal rehabilitation. The association assists in the purchase of para-medical equipment (such as walkers) and educational equipment (such as computers), a first vehicle, and remedial and enrichment classes.

=== Sports ===
ILAN operates sports activities ranging from the level of sports as a community leisure activity, through competitive sports activities, and up to the Paralympic professional level. ILAN offers sports activities for the disabled, including swimming therapy, animal assisted therapy, and specially adapted summer camps. It provides transportation services to and from these activities in designated vehicles, adapted for transporting the disabled.

=== Social and cultural activities ===
Recognizing the importance of integrating socially ILAN provides a range of activities including wheelchair dancing troupes, choirs, enrichment classes, after school activities, social clubs and youth movements.

=== Education ===
Education for physically disabled individuals fosters independence, self-esteem, and societal inclusion. and equips individuals with tools to navigate the world, promoting adaptability and resilience. ILAN offers scholarships for higher education, internship and accreditation programs and an online campus for those unable to attend classes in person.

=== Rights realization ===
ILAN has championed the rights of the physically disabled by eliminating barriers, to ensure their full societal inclusion, and fostering an environment where everyone can exercise their rights freely and participate in all aspects of life without discrimination.

== Treatment and rehabilitation centers ==
ILAN has over thirty treatment and rehabilitation centers throughout Israel, including in-house care. Among the centers are

- Beit Tamar
- Beit Adelis the Ilan Residential Home for Handicapped Young Adults
- Harry & Abe Sherman (Ilanot) School and an occupational training center.
- Beit Miriam
- Beit Melichson
- Beer Sheva Day Center
- Beit Shomrat Rehabilitation Center
- Haifa Sports Center
- Spivak Sports Center

== Prizes ==
- 2002 -the State of Israel issued a special stamp, marking fifty years of volunteer activity for disabled people.
- 2004- ILAN received the Presidential Award for Volunteerism. The committee awarded the prize to ILAN "for its exceptional achievements, is a hymn to an organization of volunteers that never ceases to innovate, develop, and provide, as much as possible, a full life for those with disabilities."
- 2010 awarded Israel Prize for Lifetime Achievement for its contribution to the State and to Society.
- 2019 received consultative status with the United Nations, referring to Non-governmental organizations (NGOs) in Consultative Status with the United Nations Economic and Social Council
