= Hilda Binns =

Canadian Paralympic athlete and swimmer

Personal information
- Born: 20 October 1945 Hamilton, Ontario, Canada
- Died: August 4, 2022 (aged 76)

Sport
- Country: Canada
- Sport: Swimming
Medal record
Athletics
Representing Canada
Summer Paralympics
Silver medal – second place	1972 Heidelberg	Women's 60m wheelchair 3
Silver medal – second place	1972 Heidelberg	Women's slalom 3
Bronze medal – third place	1972 Heidelberg	Women's pentathlon 3
Gold medal – first place	1968 Tel Aviv	Women's 25m freestyle class 2 incomplete
Gold medal – first place	1968 Tel Aviv	Women's novices 60m wheelchair dash B

Hilda May Binns (née Torok, later Longmate; October 20, 1945 – August 4, 2022) was a Canadian Paralympic athlete who competed in athletics and swimming events.

== Biography ==
Binns was born in Hamilton, Ontario In 1945 and contracted polio in 1955. Her father built her an exercise bike to help her rehabilitation.

Binns won two gold medals at the 1968 Summer Paralympics, held in Tel Aviv.

She was a founder of Steel City Wheelers, and involved with the Hamilton Post Polio Association and the Hamilton Handicapped Club.

Hilda May Torok married fellow polio survivor and athlete David Binns by 1973.

== Honors ==
She was inducted into the Hamilton Gallery of Distinction in 2018, and into the Hamilton Sports Hall of Fame in 2019. On 14 May 2021, Jovian asteroid 28958 Binns, discovered by astronomers with the LINEAR program in 2001, was named in her honor.
