= Baruch Hagai =

Israeli paralympic champion (born 1944)

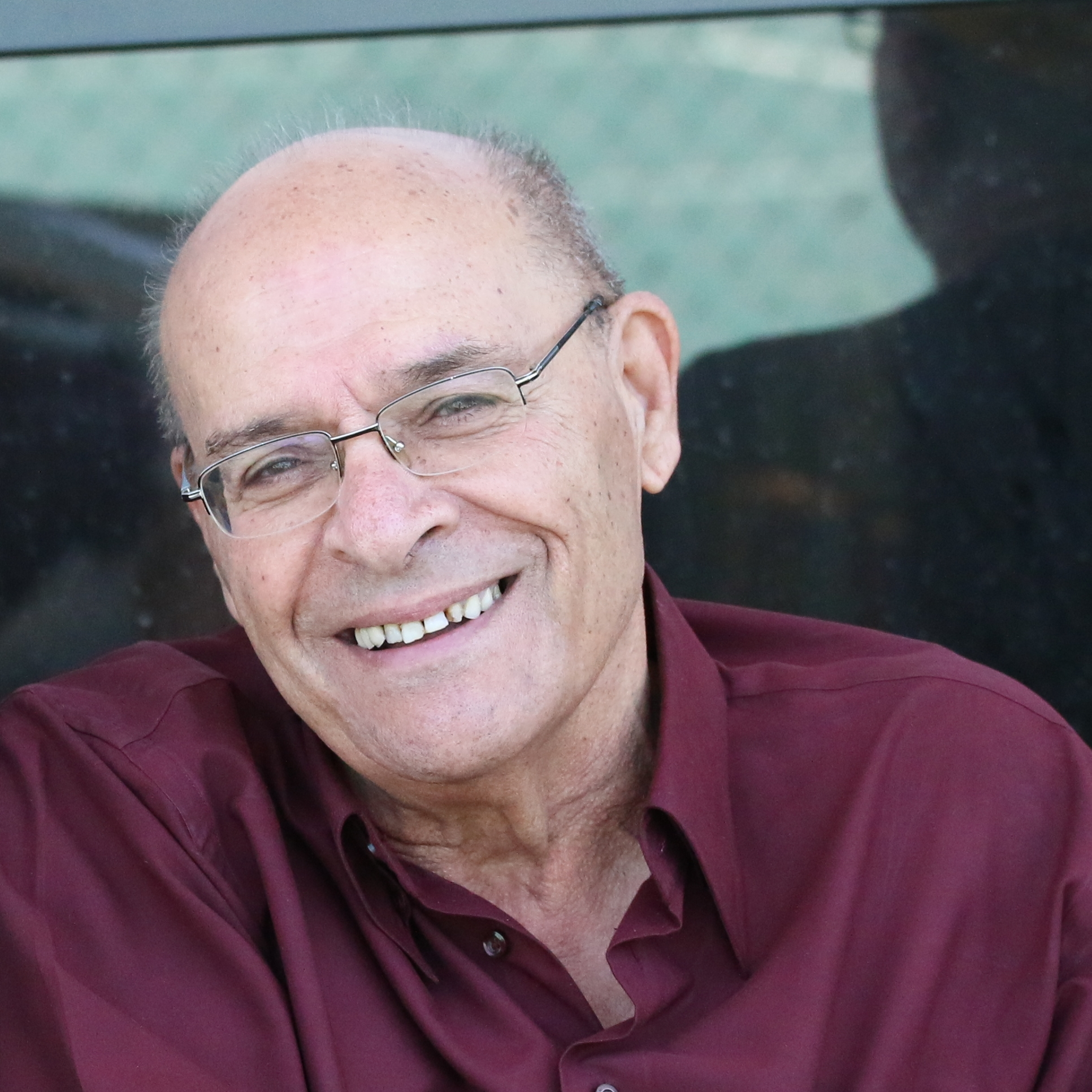
- Baruch Hagai, 2016

Personal information
- Native name: ברוך חגאי
- Born: 17 January 1944

Sport
- Country: Israel
Medal record
Representing Israel
Summer Paralympic Games
Table tennis
Gold medal – first place	1964 Tokyo	Singles C
Gold medal – first place	1968 Tel Aviv	Singles C
Gold medal – first place	1968 Tel Aviv	Doubles C
Gold medal – first place	1972 Heidelberg	Singles 4
Gold medal – first place	1976 Toronto	Singles 4-5
Bronze medal – third place	1964 Tokyo	Doubles C
Swimming
Gold medal – first place	1964 Tokyo	50m breaststroke
Bronze medal – third place	1964 Tokyo	medley relay
Wheelchair basketball
Gold medal – first place	1968 Tel Aviv	wheelchair basketball
Gold medal – first place	1980 Arnhem	wheelchair basketball
Silver medal – second place	1972 Heidelberg	wheelchair basketball
Silver medal – second place	1976 Toronto	wheelchair basketball
Bronze medal – third place	1964 Tokyo	wheelchair basketball
Stoke Mandeville Games
Table tennis
Gold medal – first place	1965	Doubles
Wheelchair basketball
Gold medal – first place	1967	wheelchair basketball
Gold medal – first place	1969	wheelchair basketball
Gold medal – first place	1981	wheelchair basketball
World Championships
Gold medal – first place	1971	wheelchair basketball
Gold medal – first place	1975	wheelchair basketball
European Championships
Gold medal – first place	1971	wheelchair basketball
Gold medal – first place	1978	wheelchair basketball
Gold medal – first place	1981	wheelchair basketball

Baruch Hagai (Hebrew: ברוך חגאי; born 1944) is an Israeli paralympic champion.

== Early life ==
Hagai was born in Tripoli, Libya, to a Jewish family of 13. At the age of two he contracted polio, and five years later his family immigrated to Israel. The family settled in Tel Aviv, where Hagai was treated for polio in Israel for the first time. Hagai was trained as a technician, and in the years 1960-2000 he worked as a technician and project manager for a bus-manufacturing factory.

== Basketball and table tennis career ==
He was one of the first to join the Israel Sports Center for the Disabled, in 1960, and was active in wheelchair basketball and in table tennis. Over the years he took part in 224 international basketball games on behalf of the Israeli national team and 66 international games on behalf of the Center. In table tennis he won four consecutive gold medals at the Paralympic Games.

Following his retirement, Hagai joined the Sports Center as head coach.

== Awards ==
In 1986, Hagai was declared as a "Man of Peace" on behalf of the International Olympic Committee.

In 2001, he was awarded with the Israel Prize, for sports, in recognition of his long years of excellence in disabled sports.

== See also ==
- List of Israel Prize recipients
