= Israel ParaSport Center =

Israeli disability organization

- מרכז ספורט איל"ן רמת גן
- Abbreviation: IPSC
- Established: 1960; 66 years ago
- Type: NGO, Non-profit organization
- Legal status: Active
- Headquarters: Ramat Gan, Israel
- Region served: Israel
- Services: Elite sports training, hydrotherapy, daycare/kindergarten, equipment workshops
- Chairman: Jacob Ben-Arie
- Executive Director: Boaz Kramer
- Head Coach: Baruch Hagai
- Affiliations: ILAN (Israel Association for Children with Disabilities)
- Budget: 99% donor-funded / 1% state-subsidized
- Website: israelparasport.org
- Formerly called: Israel Sports Center for the Disabled (ISCD)

The Israel ParaSport Center (The Center; Formerly Israel Sport Center for the Disabled (ISCD); Hebrew: מרכז הספורט לנכים) in Ramat Gan, Israel, founded in 1960, is an Israeli institution operated by ILAN aimed at the physical and psychological rehabilitation of individuals with physical disabilities through sports. The center serves thousands of members annually by offering competitive parasport training, hydrotherapy, kindergarten facilities, and adaptive sports equipment workshops.

== History ==
The Israel ParaSport Center was established in 1960 in Ramat Gan by ILAN activist Betty Dubiner. The land lot was provided by the municipality of Ramat Gan and the initial facilities were constructed partly due to a donation by Bella and Samuel Spewack from income made on their play Kiss Me, Kate. It was first of its kind in Israel and one of the few operating at the time worldwide.

In its early years, The Center was mostly used by Polio virus victims. In later years it was adjusted to serve those with Cerebral palsy, Israeli citizens injured during their military service with the IDF, survivors of car accidents and terrorist attacks and others with disabilities.

During its first years, The Center was used by 200 active sportsmen, while in 2007 it was used by approximately 80% of disabled people in Israel. It also has the highest percentage, internationally, of physically disabled children. Its current 2,000 members are active in approximately 20 sport fields, mostly in wheelchairs. Today, The Center houses a wide variety of sport fields: Swimming, wheelchair basketball, wheelchair soccer, table tennis, wheelchair tennis, wheelchair athletics and tricycle races. It also houses a gym, private sport sessions and classes of hydrotherapy and paramedical care.

Members of The Center take part, since its establishment, in the Stoke Mandeville Games and the Paralympic Games. Their achievements gained Israel a reputation in the field of rehabilitation. The wheelchair basketball team of the center had so far won two Paralympic gold medals, two world championships and three European championships.

The Center was used to host the 1968 Summer Paralympics, as the municipality of Ramat Gan made adjustments throughout the city and The Center was the main facility used for hosting the swimming and wheelchair basketball tournaments.

Today, it is also a social meeting place for its members and houses different programs of yoga and wheelchair dancing. On its premises is also a kindergarten for children with disabilities age 3 to 7.

The administrative staff of the ISCD includes its chairman and former director, Jacob Ben-Arie, a gold medal-winning Paralympic champion, head coach Baruch Hagai, a Paralympic champion and winner of the 2001 Israel Prize in sports, and director Boaz Kramer, a Paralympic silver medalist.

The Center is sponsored by donations in Israel and worldwide, with only 1% of its budget subsidized by the state. Israel ParaSport Center Friends organizations are found in the United States and the United Kingdom.

== See also ==
- Israel at the Paralympics
- Sergei Lysov (born 2004), Israeli wheelchair tennis player and Paralympian
- Ofri Lankri (born1991), former tennis player and current wheelchair tennis coach
